= List of Burmese writers =

This is a list of writers from the Asian country of Burma (sometimes called Myanmar).

Writers have been adding to Burmese literature for over a millennium. In the period since self-government in 1948, Burmese writers have frequently had to face censorship imposed under socialist and military governments.

== A–G ==
- Aung Thin
- Aye Aye Win
- Ba Shin
- Ba Than (historian)
- Richard Bartholomew
- Chan Nyein (Han Thar Waddy)
- Dagon Khin Khin Lay
- Dagon Taya
- Empire Mergui
- Fundation of Mergui
- Hla Pe
- Hmawbi Saya Thein
- Hsu Shin
- Htin Gyi

== H–M ==
- Journal Kyaw Ma Ma Lay
- Journal Kyaw U Chit Maung
- James Hla Kyaw
- Ju
- Khin Hnin Yu
- Khin Khin Htoo
- Khin Maung Nyunt
- Khin Myo Chit
- Kyi Aye
- Edward Michael Law-Yone
- Ludu Daw Amar
- Ludu Sein Win
- Ludu U Hla
- Ma Sandar
- Ma Thanegi
- Ma Thida
- Maung Htin Aung
- Maung Khin Min (Danubyu)
- Maung Maung
- Maung Thaw Ka
- Maung Wunna
- Maung Wuntha
- Mi Mi Khaing
- Min Lu
- Min Theinkha
- Min Thu Wun
- Moe Hein
- Moe Moe (Inya)
- Mya Than Tint
- Myint Myint Khin
- Myoma Myint Kywe

== N–Z ==
- Nan Nyunt Swe
- Nanda Thein Zan
- Nat Nwe
- Nay Win Myint
- Ngwe Tar Yi
- Nu Nu Yi
- Nwe Soe
- Nyo Mya
- Ohn Pe
- P Moe Nin
- Paragu
- Pascal Khoo Thwe
- Pe Aung
- Pe Maung Tin
- Pencilo
- Pho Hlaing
- Po Kya
- San San Nweh
- Sao Saimong
- Saw Mon Nyin
- Taw Phayar Galay
- Tekkatho Phone Naing
- Thakin Kodaw Hmaing
- Thakin Lwin
- Thakin Tin Mya
- Than Tun
- Thant Myint-U
- Thein Pe Myint
- Theippan Maung Wa
- Thu Kha
- Thu Maung
- Tin Moe
- Tin Shwe
- U Nu
- U Ottama
- U Thaung
- Zaw Zaw Aung
- Zawgyi
- Zenn Kyi

== See also ==
- Lists of writers
