= Burmese literature =

The literature of Myanmar (Burmese: မြန်မာစာပေ) spans over a millennium. The Burmese language, unlike other Southeast Asian languages (e.g. Thai, Khmer), adopted words primarily from Pāli rather than from Sanskrit. In addition, Burmese literature tends to reflect local folklore and culture.

Burmese literature has historically been a very important aspect of Burmese life steeped in the Pali Canon of Buddhism. Traditionally, Burmese children were educated by monks in monasteries in towns and villages. During British colonial rule, instruction was formalised and unified, and often bilingual, in both English and Burmese, known as Anglo-Vernacular. Burmese literature played a key role in disseminating nationalism among the Burmese during the colonial era, with writers such as Thakin Kodaw Hmaing, an outspoken critic of British colonialism in Burma.

Beginning soon after self-rule, government censorship in Burma has been heavy, stifling literary expression.

== Classical literature ==
The earliest forms of Burmese literature were on stone engravings called kyauksa (Burmese: ကျောက်စာ) for memorials or for special occasions such as the building of a temple or a monastery. Later, palm leaves called peisa (ပေစာ) were used as paper, which resulted in the rounded forms of the Burmese alphabet. During the Bagan dynasty, King Anawrahta adopted Theravada Buddhism as the state religion, and brought many Pali texts from Ceylon. These texts were translated, but Pali remained the literary medium of the Burmese kingdom. Furthermore, Pali influenced the Burmese language in structure, because of literal translations of Pali text called nissaya (နိဿယ).

The earliest works of Burmese literature date from the Bagan dynasty. They include prose recording monarchical merit acts and poetic works, the earliest of which was Yakhaing minthami eigyin (Cradle Song of the Princess of Arakan), dated to 1455. During the Bagan and Inwa dynasties, two primary types of literature flourished, mawgun (မော်ကွန်း) and eigyin, (ဧချင်း) and pyo (ပျို့), religious works generally derived from the Jataka tales.

Non-fiction and religious works prevailed during this period although kagyin (ကာချင်း), a war poem by a monarch, was an early form of this genre in history.

As literature grew more liberal and secular, poetry became the most popular form of literature in Burma. The flexibility of the Burmese language, because of its monosyllabic and tonal nature, and its lack of many consonantal finals allowed poetry to utilise various rhyming schemes. By the 15th century, four primary genres of poetry had emerged, namely pyo (poems based on the Jataka Tales, linka (လင်္ကာ metaphysical and religious poems), mawgun (historical verses written as a hybrid of epic and ode), and eigyin (lullabies of the royal family). Courtiers also perfected the myittaza (မေတ္တာစာ), a long prose letter.

Buddhist monks were also influential in developing Burmese literature. Shin Aggathammadi rendered in verse the Jataka stories. During this time, Shin Maha Thilawuntha (1453–1520) wrote a chronicle on the history of Buddhism. A contemporary of his, Shin Ottama Gyaw, was famous for his epic verses called tawla (တောလား) that revelled in the natural beauty of the seasons, forests and travel. Yawei Shin Htwe, a maid of honour, wrote another form of poetry called aingyin on the 55 styles of hairdressing.

After the conquest of Siam by the Toungoo dynasty, Thailand became a Burmese colony. This conquest incorporated many Thai elements into Burmese literature. Most evident were the yadu or yatu (ရတု), an emotional and philosophic verse and the yagan (ရကန်), which imitated the themes of the yadu genre, which was more emotionally involved, could be inspired by mood, place, incident, and often addressed to sweethearts and wives. Famous writers of yadu include Nawade I (1545–1600) and Prince Natshinnaung (1578–1619). Some parts of Laos and Cambodia also became Burmese colonies during the Second Burmese Empire and thereby influenced Burmese literature.

In the areas of law, there were two major types of literature, dhammathat (ဓမ္မသတ်), which appeared prior to the 13th century, and shauk-htone (လျှောက်ထုံး), which were compilations of brief accounts of historic cases and events in simple narrative to serve as guides and legal precedents for rulers.

As the Konbaung dynasty emerged in the 18th century, the Third Burmese Empire was founded. This era has been dubbed the "Golden Age of Literature", with poets such as Letwe Thondara, Hlaing Thate Khaung Tin, Selay U Ponenya. After a second conquest of Ayutthaya (Thailand), many spoils of war were brought to the Burmese court. The Ramayana (ရာမယန) was introduced and was adapted in Burmese. In addition, the Ramayana inspired romantic poems, which became popular literary sojourns among the royal class. Burmese literature during this period was therefore modelled after the Ramayana, and dramatic plays were patronised by the Burmese court. The other famous literature are called: taydat (တေးထပ်), laygyo (လေးချိုး), dwaygyo (ဒွေးချိုး) and bawle (ဘောလယ်).

=== First printing press (1816) ===
The arrival of the first printing press in Burma in 1816, sent by the British Serampore Mission, helped to liberalise centuries-old traditions of writing in verse (lay-lone tha-paik (‌လေးလုံးတစ်ပိုဒ်), a poetry type, where four syllable lines are linked in a climbing rhyme and grouped into stanzas of 30 lines.).

Monks remained powerful in Burmese literature, compiling histories of Burma. Kyigan Shingyi (1757–1807) wrote the Jataka Tales incorporating Burmese elements, including the myittaza (Pali metta or love + Burmese sa or letter), which are love letters and are important sources of first-hand accounts of the economic and social changes Burma was undergoing before colonialism. During the First Anglo-Burmese War (1823–1826), more solemn and muted moods exuded from Burmese literature, including lyrical music. In addition, yazawin, historical chronicles, became important in the Konbaung dynasty, although they had been written since the Inwa dynasty. In 1724, U Kala wrote the Maha Yazawin (The Great Chronicles), covering Burmese history until 1711.

In 1829, King Bagyidaw appointed scholars to compile the Hmannan Yazawin (Glass Palace Chronicle), covering Burmese history until 1821. A successor king, King Mindon Min appointed a committee of Burmese scholars from 1867 to 1869 to create the Dutiya Yazawin (The Second Great Royal Chronicles). The final major royal chronicle the Konbaung Set Yazawin was published in 1905 by Maung Maung Tin, a British colonial official and related to Konbaung royalty.

== British Burma (1824–1948) ==
When Burma became a colony of British India, Burmese literature continued to flourish, even though the institution of the Burmese monarchy, the leading patron of Burmese arts and literature in pre-colonial times, had been dismantled. English literature was still relatively inaccessible, although both English and Burmese, in a curriculum called Anglo-Vernacular, were now taught in schools. Despite the fact that Burmese literature was well entrenched in Burmese culture, the lack of patrons to support literature slowed its further development. The colonial period marked a tremendous change in Burmese literature, which had once been patronised and innovated by members of the royal court, and was now being led by civilians such as university students.

In 1910, J S Furnivall established the Burma Research Society, which further emboldened the Burmese to protect their literary and cultural heritage. Beginning in the 1920s, a nationalist movement emerged, and this influence became evident in modern novels, short stories, and poems. At the University of Rangoon, student writers continued to develop new forms of Burmese poetry.

A major landmark in Burmese literature was called the Hkit san (Testing the Times, ခေတ်စမ်း) movement, a search for a new style and content, led most notably by Theippan Maung Wa along with Nwe Soe, Zawgyi, Min Thu Wun and Mya Kaytu, while still at university and after, in the decade before the Second World War. During the Hkit san movement, University of Rangoon students innovated new styles of writing, with shorter and clearer sentences, and unadorned prose, a radical transformation from royal writings of the pre-colonial eras beforehand. The movement for independence continued to fuel Burmese literature.

Thakin Kodaw Hmaing was greatly influential in spawning this anti-colonial literature with his powerful laygyo gyi (လေးချိုးကြီး) and htika (ဋီကာ) verses famous for their patriotic and satirical content. Hmawbi Hsaya Thein was particularly influential, with Bazat yazawin (Oral Chronicles), which relied on oral tradition. Novels also came into vogue, with the first being James Hla Kyaw's Maung Yin Maung Ma Me Ma, written in 1904 and inspired by the Count of Monte Cristo. Kala paw wut-htu (ကာလပေါ်ဝတ္ထု, 'modern novels') became popular during this era, with P Moe Nin writing the first Burmese novels to focus on the individual and place that character at the centre of the plot.

Theippan Maung Wa and Thein Pe Myint were among other original and innovative authors from the colonial period. Female writers, such as Dagon Khin Khin Lay, who wrote about the hardships of peasant life under colonialism, also gained prominence during the nationalist period leading up to independence. The British author George Orwell, who was severely critical of British colonialism, wrote Burmese Days published in 1935.

In addition, literary culture in Burma expanded to the masses during this period, with the arrival of printing presses and publishers, such as the Hanthawaddy Press, a major publisher of Burmese and Buddhist works established by Phillip Ripley. In the 1920s to the 1930s, monthly literary magazines like Dagon and Ganda Lawka (World of Classics) were published to connect readers to writers, who often published novels in serial installations.

== Post-independence literature (1948–present) ==
After independence in 1948, Burmese literature developed further to adopt and assimilate Western styles of writing. A year earlier, the Burmese Translation Society, a government-subsidised organisation, was founded to translate foreign works, especially those related to the fields of science and technology. In 1963, a year after the socialist coup, the society was merged into the Sapay Beikman (စာပေဗိမာန်), a government publishing house. Another influential publisher was the Pagan Press (est. 1962), which translated Socialist and Marxist works into Burmese. In 1976, the first Burmese Encyclopedia (မြန်မာ့ စွယ်စုံကျမ်း) was published.

The socialist government, like the previous civilian government, was a patron of Burmese literature, believing "enriching literature" to be a goal of socialist democracies, as outlined in the Revolutionary Council's System of Correlation of Man and his Environment. However, censorship and promotion of socialist ideology became important aims of the government, in regulating literature, as seen in the reorganisation of the Ministry of Information, which censored works according to three primary objectives that aimed to promote socialism:

1. To introduce necessary bills, acts and orders concerning literature and information agencies.
2. To promote the participation of the people in the construction of the socialist state.
3. To defend the socialist system from its ideological enemies.

—Discussion of the National Literary Conference. Rangoon: Ministry of Information, 1963.

=== Censorship ===
In 1971, the government formed the Burmese literary Commission, to develop Burmese literature further. On 5 July 1975, the Printers and Publishers' Central Registration Board, the main censorship board of the Home Ministry (four years earlier, the Board had been a part of the Information Ministry), issued a statement to warn publishers to self-censor works (especially those criticising the Burma Socialist Programme Party, the government, pornographic writing and libel), undermining the principle of freedom of expression. Many contemporary works are of history and biographical accounts. Because of strict government censorship beginning in the 1960s with the rule of Ne Win, Burmese literature has become subdued in many ways.

By 1976, only 411 titles were published annually, compared to 1882, when 445 titles were published. Various factors, especially the lengthened bureaucratic process to obtain printing permits, censorship, and increasing economic hardship of consumers because of the socialist economic schemes, contributed to the decline of Burmese literary output.

Popular novels have similar themes, often involving adventure, espionage, detective work, and romance. Many writers also translate Western novels, especially those of Arthur Hailey and Harold Robbins. The flourishing translation sector is the result of the Burmese government, which did not sign the Universal Copyright Convention Agreement, which would have forced Burmese writers to pay royalties to the original writers.

Short stories, often published in magazines, also enjoy tremendous popularity. They often deal with everyday life and have political messages (such as subtle criticisms of the capitalist system), partly because, unlike novels, short stories are not censored by the Press Scrutiny Board. Poetry is also a popular genre today, as it was during the monarchical times, but unlike novels and other works, which use literary Burmese, it may use the vernacular instead of literary Burmese. This reform movement is led by left-leaning writers who believe laymen's language (the vernacular and colloquial form of Burmese) ought to be used instead of formal Burmese in literature.

One of the greatest female writers of the Post-colonial period is Journal Kyaw Ma Ma Lay. Khin Myo Chit was another important writer, who wrote, among her works, The 13-Carat Diamond (1955), which was translated into many languages. The journalist Ludu U Hla was the author of numerous volumes of ethnic minority folklore, novels about inmates in U Nu-era jails, and biographies of people working in different occupations. The prime minister U Nu himself wrote several politically oriented plays and novels.

Other prolific writers of the post-colonial era include Thein Pe Myint (and his The Ocean Traveller and the Pearl Queen, considered a Burmese classic), Mya Than Tint (known for his translations of Western classics like War and Peace), Thawda Swe and Myat Htun. Distinguished female writers, who have also been an ever-present force in Burmese literary history, include Kyi Aye, Khin Hnin Yu, and San San Nweh.

== Contemporary ==
In 2012, the anthology Bones Will Crow: 15 Contemporary Burmese Poets was edited by Ko Ko Thett and James Byrne. It featured poetry from Tin Moe, Thitsar Ni, Aung Cheimt, Ma Ei, Maung Chaw Nwe, Maung Pyiyt Min, Khin Aung Aye, Zeyar Lynn, Maung Thein Zaw, Moe Zaw, Moe Way, Ko Ko Thett, Eaindra, Pandora and Maung Yu Py, and was published by Arc Publications Anthologies in Translation series and, later in 2013, by Northern Illinois University Press in the United States. This bilingual English/Burmese edition of poetry is regarded as the first anthology of modern Burmese poetry in the West.

== Notable writers ==
The journalist Ludu U Hla (1910–1982) was the author of numerous volumes of ethnic minority folklore, novels about inmates in U Nu-era jails, and biographies of people working in different occupations. The prime minister, U Nu, himself wrote several politically oriented plays and novels. Other writers who came of age before 1947, during the colonial era included Hmawbi Saya Thein (1862–1942), James Hla Kyaw (1866–1919), U Ottama (1879–1939), Thakin Kodaw Hmaing (1876–1964), P Moe Nin (1883–1940), Pe Maung Tin (1888–1973), Po Kya (1891–1942), Theippan Maung Wa (1899–1942), Dagon Khin Khin Lay (1904–1981), Saya Zawgyi (1907–1990), Htin Aung (1909–1978), Min Thu Wun (1909-2004), Thukha (1910–2005), Chit Maung (1913–1945), Thein Pe Myint (1914–1978) who wrote the classic The Ocean Traveller and the Pearl Queen, Richard Bartholomew (1926–1985) and Taw Phayar Galay (1926–2006).

Younger authors who became well known in Burma include Aung Thin (born c. 1927), Mya Than Tint (1929–1998) who was known for his translations of Western classics like War and Peace, Tekkatho Phone Naing (1930–2002), Maung Hsu Shin (c. 1932–2009), Tin Moe (1933–2007), Nanda Thein Zan (1947-2011), and Pascal Khoo Thwe (born 1967). Other well-known authors include Thawda Swe, Chit Oo Nyo, Maung Khin Min (Danubyu), and Saw Wai.

Well-known Burmese historians include San C. Po (1870–1946), Htin Aung (1909–1978), Sao Saimong (1913–1987), Ba Shin (1914–1971), Than Tun (1923–2005), Myoma Myint Kywe (born 1960) and Thant Myint-U (born 1966).

Distinguished female writers, who have also been an ever-present force in Burmese literary history, include Kyi Aye, Ludu Daw Amar (1915–2008), Khin Hnin Yu (1925–2003), Aung San Suu Kyi (born 1945), Minfong Ho (born 1951), Nu Nu Yi (born 1957), San San Nweh, Jue (born 1958), Khin Khin Htoo (born 1965) Ma Sandar (1942 born) and Mi Chan Wai. One of the greatest female writers of the post-colonial period is Journal Kyaw Ma Ma Lay (1917–1982). Khin Myo Chit (1915–1999) was another important writer, who wrote, among her works, The 13-Carat Diamond (1955), which was translated into many languages.

== See also ==
- Culture of Burma
- Yama Zatdaw
- Cinema of Burma
- Censorship in Burma
- Literature about Southeast Asia
- List of Burmese writers
- Annemarie Esche
