= Myanmar Yazawin (Ba Than) =

1930 book on Burmese history

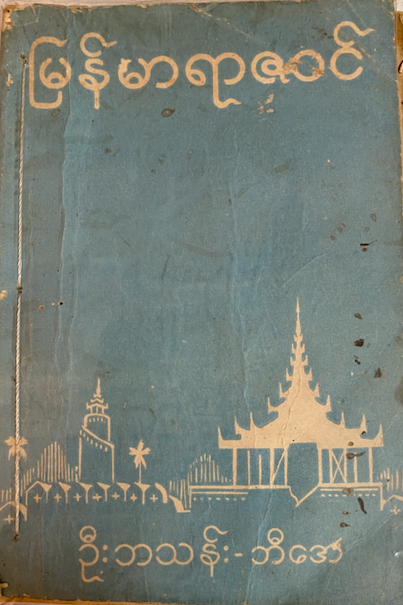
- Author: Ba Than
- Original title: မြန်မာ ရာဇဝင်
- Language: Burmese
- Genre: History
- Publisher: Sarpay Beikman (8th edition)
- Publication date: 1930–1952 (1st–8th editions), 1991 (reprint)

Myanmar Yazawin (Burmese: မြန်မာ ရာဇဝင်) is a book on Burmese history. First published in 1930, it became the first full-fledged Burmese language Burmese history textbook in British Burma. It was used in Burmese vernacular high schools until the 1950s. The book's first two editions, published in 1930 and 1931, were written by Ba Than, a high school teacher who had taught in nationalist schools in Lower Burma. After Ba Than's death in 1931, six more editions with periodic updates were published to 1952 by Ba Than's eldest brother U Sein, the longterm editor of the Myanma Alin newspaper. The eighth edition was republished in 1991.

== Brief ==
The book was based on Ba Than's many years' experience as a history teacher, and the research he had done over the years. He had consulted several Burmese chronicles, primarily Hmannan Yazawin and Maha Yazawin, Burmese history books written by British historians (including A.P. Phayre, S.W. Cocks and G.E. Harvey) as well as English translations of Siamese and Lan Na history. He had wanted to bring a more complete textbook than those in use at the time when most Burmese vernacular schools used a Burmese translation of Cocks's A Short History of Burma or an abridged version of the Hmannan chronicle by Ba Tin of Mandalay. He completed the book in 1929 in Kangyidaunt, and published it in 1930.

The book was an instant success. It was quickly adopted as a high school textbook in many schools throughout the country. (Note: (Myo Oo 2012: 2): The book became a (the?) "prescribed Myanmar [Burmese] history textbook." This was most probably for Burmese vernacular schools of the day. Per Ba Than's preface in the first edition, (Ba Than 1951: 4), English vernacular schools taught most subjects including Burmese history (and even Burmese grammar) in English.) Ba Than immediately began work on the second edition in 1930, adding more material based on works by Western historians such as A. Dalrymple, J. Gray, and D.G.E. Hall as well as feedback by Burmese scholars and writers such as Po Kya, Po Lat, and Theippan Maung Wa (who was a student of his at the Maha Buddhaghosa high school). On balance, according to historians Tun Aung Chain and Ni Ni Myint, the book primarily relies on the chronicles. At any rate, the book was published eight times between 1930 and 1952.

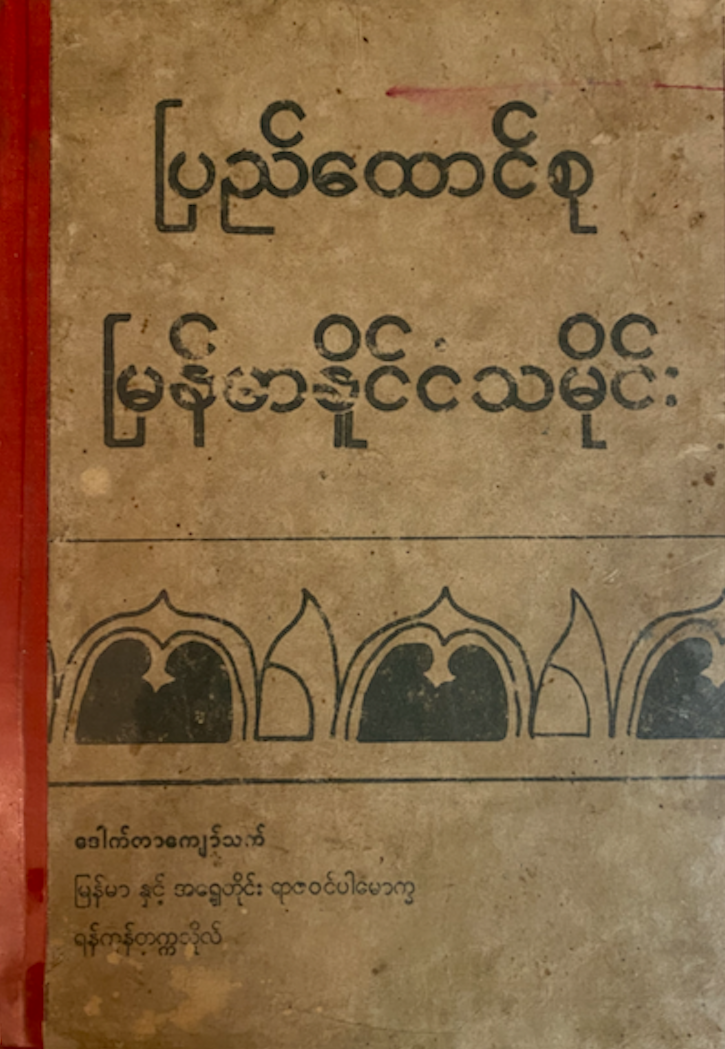
Kyaw Thet's History of the Union Burma (1962), adopted as the high school history textbook

But Ba Than died shortly after finishing work on the second edition in November 1930. (Note: (Ba Than 1951: 10): Ba Than signed his preface to the second edition on 17 November 1930.) The next two editions, likely published in 1932 and 1933, did not contain any new updates, and any forewords by the author. The next update to the book was overseen by Ba Than's brother Sein in 1934, and published as the fifth edition. Sein went on to publish the subsequent editions of the book. The sixth edition was just a second printing of the fifth edition while the seventh edition, published in 1951, contains updates to the day of Burmese independence, 4 January 1948. (Note: See Appendix 5 in (Ba Than 1951: 484–496).) The book fell out of use from Burmese high schools after the 1950s, certainly after 1962. (Note: (Ni Ni Myint 2003: 123–124): Prewar textbooks included works by Ba Than and Ohn Maung. Kyaw Thet's book Pyidaungsu Myanmar Naingngan Thamaing (History of the Union of Burma) was adopted as the high school textbook. Per (Kyaw Thet 1962), the first edition of Kyaw Thet's book was published in 1962.) It was republished again in 1991 to raise the awareness of the book among the public.

== Bibliography ==
- Ba Than, U (1951). မြန်မာ ရာဇဝင် [History of Myanmar] (in Burmese) (7 ed.). Rangoon: Sarpay Beikman.
- Kyaw Thet (1962). ပြည်ထောင်စု မြန်မာနိုင်ငံ သမိုင်း [History of the Union of Burma] (in Burmese) (1 ed.). Rangoon: Inwa Taik.
- Myo Oo (11 March 2012), "The Burmese in the History Textbook Prescribed for Burmese Vernacular Schools" (PDF), Southeast Asian Studies Symposium, St. Anthony's College, Oxford
- Ni Ni Myint (2003), "Myanmar Historiography Since 1945", in Abu Talib Ahmad; Liok Ee Tan (eds.), New Terrains in Southeast Asian History, Ohio University Press, ISBN 9780896802285
