= Ba Than (historian) =

Burmese historian and author

- ဘသန်း
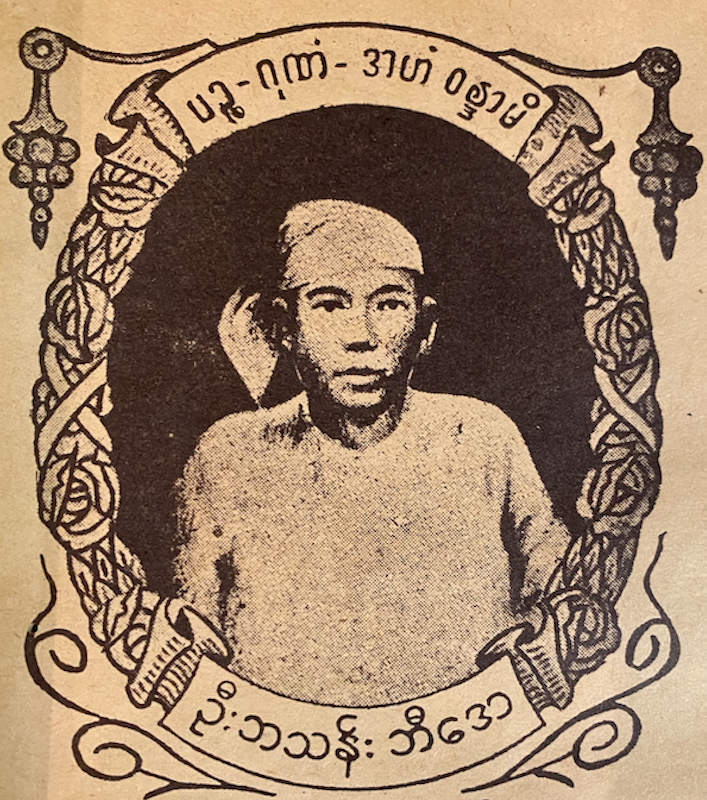
- Born: c. 1870s Bassein (Pathein), British Burma
- Died: c. 1931
- Education: Rangoon College (B.A.)
- Occupations: Teacher, writer, poet, historian
- Writing career
- Pen name: U Ba Than (B.A.); B.A. Maung Than, Myo Chit, Sa-Chit, Nga Pyin
- Genres: history, fiction
- Notable works: Myanmar Yazawin; B.A. Maung Ba Lwin

Ba Than (Burmese: ဘသန်း, pronounced [ba̰ ðáɰ̃]; 1870s – c. 1931) was a Burmese school teacher, writer, and historian in the early 20th century British Burma. He is best known for his seminal Burmese history textbook Myanmar Yazawin, used in Burmese high schools from the 1930s to the 1950s. He is also known for his 1919 novel B.A. Maung Ba Lwin and the short-lived Myo-Chit newspaper, which he co-founded in 1924.

== Early life ==
Ba Than was the youngest son of U Maung Lay and Daw Ma Ma of Bassein (Pathein). He and his brothers Sein (b. 1870) and Ba Gyan all became notable figures in British Burma. Sein became the longtime chief editor of the anti-colonialist Myanma Alin newspaper while Ba Gyan became a writer with the pen name of Pathein Ba Gyan. Ba Than received a B.A. from Rangoon College, in an era when only a select few could pursue a university education. (Note: So few was the number of university educated in those days that many university educated Burmese affixed "B.A." to their names. Ba Than himself used the pen name U Ba Than (B.A.) Furthermore as seen in his preface to the second edition of Myanmar Yazawin per (Ba Than 1951: 10), Ba Than identified some reviewers of the book Po Kya, Po Lat, Sein Tin by attaching their degrees to their names.)

== Career ==
After college, Ba Than chose to become a school teacher, spurning more lucrative career opportunities. He ended up at Shin Maha Buddhaghosa High School, a nationalist school in Moulmein (Mawlamyine) where he taught several subjects: English, Burmese, geography, mathematics and history. He also dabbled as a writer and journalist on the side, writing several newspaper columns, short stories and poems under several pen names, and publishing his first novel B.A. Maung Ba Lwin in 1919. In 1924, he and his brother Ba Gyan started the Myo-Chit (lit. "The Patriot") newspaper in Rangoon (Yangon). But the paper failed, and he returned to teaching, ending up at Taingyintha High School in Kangyidaunt, near his native Bassein, by 1929. (By his own account in 1929, he had taught in three schools over his career: Shin Maha Buddhaghosa High School, and Taingyintha High School in Moulmein, and Taingyintha High School in Kangyidaunt.)

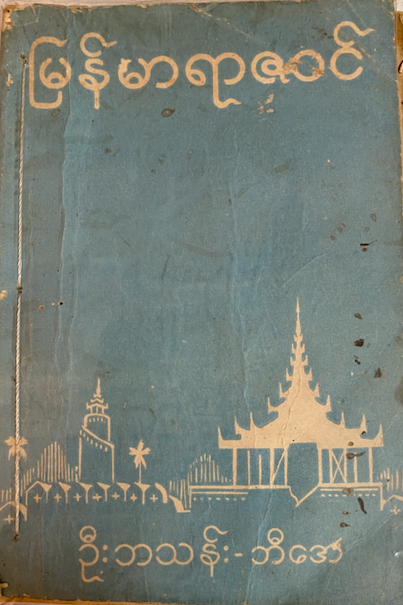
7th edition of Myanmar Yazawin (1951)

== Success with Myanmar Yazawin ==
It was then that he wrote his most famous book, Myanmar Yazawin, intended to be a high school textbook on Burmese history. It was based on his many years' experience as a history teacher, and the research he had done over the years. He had consulted several Burmese chronicles, primarily Hmannan Yazawin and Maha Yazawin, Burmese history books written by British historians (including A.P. Phayre, S.W. Cocks and G.E. Harvey) as well as English translations of Siamese and Lan Na history. He had wanted to bring a more complete textbook than those in use at the time when most Burmese vernacular schools used a Burmese translation of Cocks's A Short History of Burma or an abridged version of the Hmannan chronicle by Ba Tin of Mandalay. He finished writing the book in 1929 in Kangyidaunt, and the book was published in 1930.

The book was an instant success. It was quickly adopted as a high school textbook in many schools throughout the country. (Note: (Myo Oo 2012: 2): The book became a (the?) "prescribed Myanmar [Burmese] history textbook." This was most probably for Burmese vernacular schools of the day. Per Ba Than's preface in the first edition, (Ba Than 1951: 4), English vernacular schools taught most subjects including Burmese history (and even Burmese grammar) in English.) Ba Than immediately began work on the second edition in 1930, adding more material based on works by Western historians such as A. Dalrymple, J. Gray, and D.G.E. Hall as well as feedback by Burmese scholars and writers such as Po Kya, Po Lat, and Theippan Maung Wa (who was a student of his at the Maha Buddhaghosa high school). On balance, according to historians Tun Aung Chain and Ni Ni Myint, the book primarily relies on the chronicles. At any rate, the book was published eight times between 1930 and 1952.

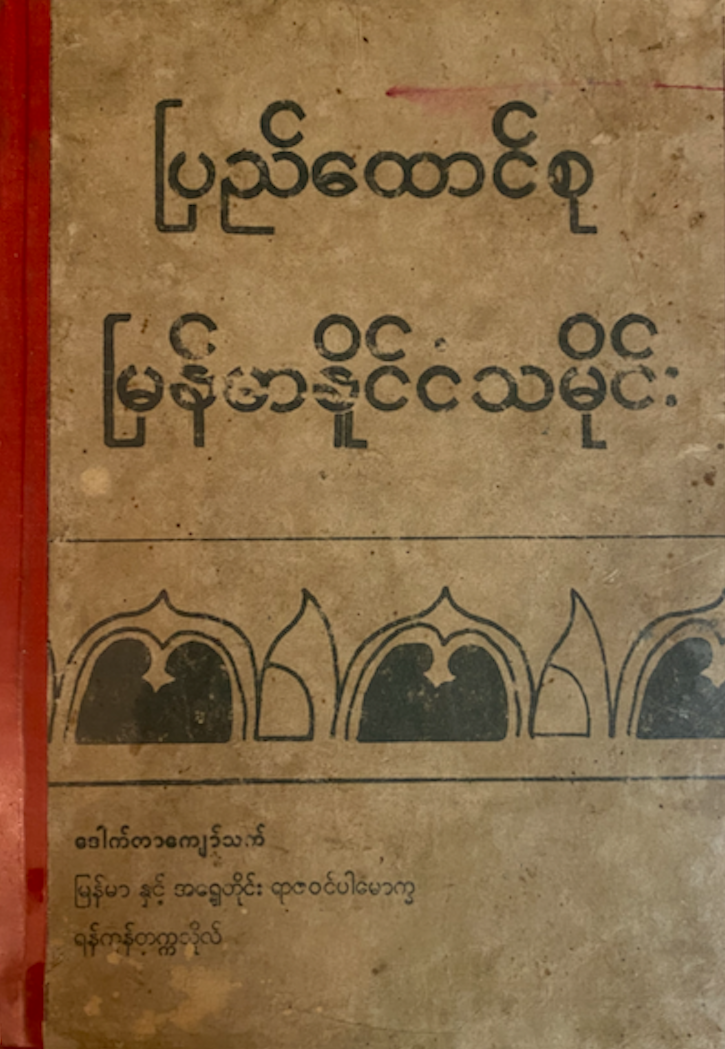
Kyaw Thet's History of the Union Burma (1962), adopted as the high school history textbook

But Ba Than did not live to see much of the success. He apparently died shortly after finishing work on the second edition in November 1930. (Note: (Ba Than 1951: 10): Ba Than signed his preface to the second edition on 17 November 1930.) The next two editions, likely published in 1932 and 1933, did not contain any new updates, and any forewords by the author. The next update to the book was overseen by Ba Than's brother Sein in 1934, and published as the fifth edition. Sein went on to publish the subsequent editions of the book. The sixth edition was just a second printing of the fifth edition while the seventh edition, published in 1951, contains updates to the day of Burmese independence, 4 January 1948. (Note: See Appendix 5 in (Ba Than 1951: 484–496).) The book fell out of use from Burmese high schools after the 1950s, certainly after 1962. (Note: (Ni Ni Myint 2003: 123–124): Prewar textbooks included works by Ba Than and Ohn Maung. Kyaw Thet's book Pyidaungsu Myanmar Naingngan Thamaing (History of the Union of Burma) was adopted as the high school textbook. Per (Kyaw Thet 1962), the first edition of Kyaw Thet's book was published in 1962.) It was republished again in 1991 to raise the awareness of the book among the public.

== Bibliography ==
- Ba Than, U (1951). မြန်မာ ရာဇဝင် [History of Myanmar] (in Burmese) (7 ed.). Rangoon: Sarpay Beikman.
- The Irrawaddy (1 May 2004), Chronology of the Press in Burma, The Irrawaddy
- Kyaw Thet (1962). ပြည်ထောင်စု မြန်မာနိုင်ငံ သမိုင်း [History of the Union of Burma] (in Burmese) (1 ed.). Rangoon: Inwa Taik.
- Min Yu Wai (January 1963), "ရာဇဝင်ဦးဘသန်းနှင့် ကျွန်တော်" [Yazawin U Ba Than and I], Ngwe Ta-Yi Magazine (in Burmese), pp. 65–69
- Myo Oo (11 March 2012), "The Burmese in the History Textbook Prescribed for Burmese Vernacular Schools" (PDF), Southeast Asian Studies Symposium, St. Anthony's College, Oxford
- Ni Ni Myint (2003), "Myanmar Historiography Since 1945", in Abu Talib Ahmad; Liok Ee Tan (eds.), New Terrains in Southeast Asian History, Ohio University Press, ISBN 9780896802285
- Than Win Hlaing (2009), အကျော်ဇေယျ စာဆိုတော်များ [Famous and Successful Writers], Arman-Thit Sarpay
