= Basic Education High School No. 2 Dagon =

Coordinates: 16°47′08.67″N 96°08′51.10″E

Basic Education High School No. 2, Dagon Township
- အမှတ် (၂) အခြေခံပညာအထက်တန်းကျောင်း၊ ဒဂုံမြို့နယ်

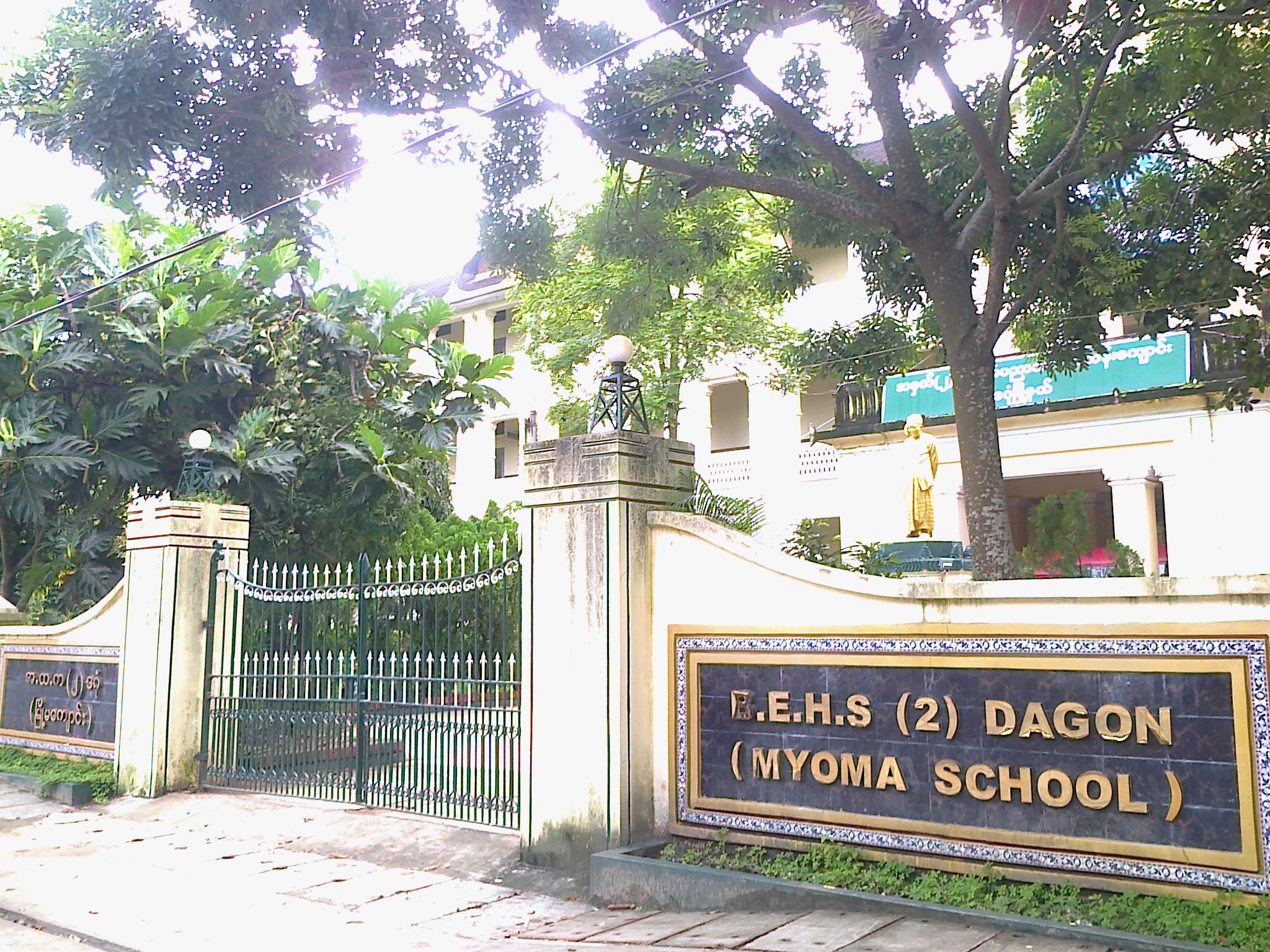
- Basic Education High School No. 2 Dagon

Location
- 353 Myoma Kyaung Lane, Dagon; Yangon, Yangon Region; Myanmar

Information
- Type: Public
- Mottoes: Excellence for all
- Established: Founded in 1920; 106 years ago (built in 1929)
- Founder: Pho Latt
- School number: 2
- Principal: Sai Ko Lay
- Faculty: 100
- Grades: K–10
- Enrollment: 4200
- Nickname: Myoma School

Designations

Yangon City Landmark

Basic Education High School No. 2, Dagon Township (Burmese: အမှတ် (၂) အခြေခံပညာအထက်တန်းကျောင်း၊ ဒဂုံမြို့နယ်; formerly, Rangoon Myoma National High School, ရန်ကုန်မြို့မအမျိုးသားအထက်တန်းကျောင်း) is a public high school located a few miles north of downtown Yangon, Myanmar. The former nationalist high school founded for the children of the common folk now educates mostly the children of well-to-do Burmese families from Dagon and the surrounding areas. It was one of the first "nationalist schools" opened after the First National Strike against British rule in Burma.

== History ==
The Myoma school was founded in Dagon township in December 1920. The school is regarded as the first nationalist school opened in Burma as it was established in 1920. The school was founded as the Myoma National High School by Ba Lwin after Pho Latt and Ngwe Zin. The current building was built in 1929 as part of a nationwide movement by the nationalist Burmese to counter what they perceived as drawbacks of the British colonial education system: lack of access, and a heavily biased curriculum.

The colonial education system relied heavily on a small number of private (mostly parochial) schools like St. Paul's English High School that were out of reach for most Burmese. Even the wealthy Burmese who could afford the schools were unsatisfied with the heavy Anglo-centric nature of the curriculum. (This led to the First Yangon University Strike in December 1920. The event is still celebrated annually as National Day.) Throughout the 1920s, the nationalist Burmese set up a parallel education system of national schools throughout the country. In 1929, Ba Lwin founded the school in Yangon. He would go on to guide the school until 1953.

The school was nationalized in April 1965 and renamed to Basic Education High School No. 2 Dagon. Commonly known as Dagon 2 today, it is a nationally prominent school due to its heritage.

The access touted in the school's founding has dissipated. Dagon 2 today draws its student body overwhelmingly from well-to-do families who can pay a large "donation" every year.

The school is listed on the Yangon City Heritage List. The Blue Plaque has been installed on the structure by the Yangon Heritage Trust in November 2018.

== Notable alumni ==
=== Arts and literature ===
- Hsu Shin: Famous writer
- Ma Sandar: Famous writer
- Myoma Myint Kywe: Famous writer, historian and chief instructor of Soshiki Karate Academy
- Zawgyi: Distinguished writer, poet and one of the leaders of the Khit-San literary movement in the 1930s

=== Business ===
- Maung Shwe: Chairman of Myanmar–India Merchants' Association

=== Military ===
- Rear-Adm. Chit Hlaing: former Commander-in-Chief (Navy)
- Lieutenant General Maung Hla: Minister
- General Kyaw Win (Dr. Kyaw Win): Director of Medical Services, Burma Army Medical Corp sand Retired Myanmar Ambassador to the Court of St. James
- Lieutenant General Phone Myint: Home Affairs Minister
- Major General Sein Htwa: Social welfare minister
- Commodore Thaung Tin: Former Commander-in-Chief (Navy)
- Lieutenant General Thein Win: Commander in Chiefs and Chief of Air Staff

=== Politics and government ===
- Bo Letya: one of the Thirty Comrades; Commander-in-Chief of the Burma Defence Army (1943–45); War Minister (1944–45); Deputy prime minister (1948–52)
- Bo Mingaung: one of the Thirty Comrades
- U Nu: Prime Minister of Burma (1948–1956, 1957–1958, 1960–1962)
- Myoma U Than Kywe: One of the negotiators of the historical Panglong Conference in 1947. The signing of Panglong Agreement is now celebrated as a national holiday, Union Day.
- Ye Htoon: lawyer, political dissident
- Bo Zeya: one of the Thirty Comrades
- Win Tin: Journalist and politician, Burmese Democracy activist

=== Religion ===
- Sayadaw Vinaya: Monk, Abbot of Kaba-Aye Sunlun Meditation Monastery in Yangon

=== Science ===
- Maung Maung Kha: Burma's first physicist;

=== Sports ===
- Sein Hlaing: Most successful coach of Myanmar national football team; Winner of FIFA Centennial Order Merit Award.

== List of principals ==
- Pho Latt : 1920 (served as headmaster for a few months, vice-president of Rangoon University Students' Boycott Council in 1920)
- Ngwe Zin : 1920–23
- Ba Lwin : 1923–53
- Aye Thwe : 1953–57
- Ba Tin : 1957–68
- Ba Saw : 1968–70
- Hla Thein : 1970–72
- Nyein Maung : 1972–82
- Win Soe : 1982–84
- Tin Win : 1985–88
- Khin Maung Nyunt : 1988–90
- Han Thein : 1990–97
- Tha Win : 1998–99
- Tin Hlaing : 1999–2002
- Tin Maung Tun : 2002–2011
- Aye Thinn : 2011–2016
- Sai Ko Lay : 2016–2018
- Ko Ko Naing : 2018–present
