= Ba Than =

Ba Than may refer to:

- Ba Than (historian) (1870s–c. 1931), writer, poet and historian
- Ba Than (surgeon) (1895–1971), Burmese surgeon and professor
