= Botataung =

Botataung (Burmese: ဗိုလ်တထောင်) is a Burmese name that may refer to:

- Botataung Pagoda: A pagoda in eastern Yangon, Myanmar
- Botataung Pagoda Road: An avenue in eastern Yangon leading to the Botataung Pagoda.
- Botataung Township: A township in eastern Yangon
- The Botataung: Now defunct Burmese language national daily newspaper
