= Esche =

Esche may refer to:

== People ==
- Annemarie Esche (1925–2018), German scholar of Burmese literature
- Charles Esche (born 1963), English museum curator
- Eberhard Esche (1933–2006), German actor
- Robert Esche (born 1978), American ice hockey player

== Places ==
- Esche, Lower Saxony, Germany
