= Kagyin =

Form of Burmese martial song

A kagyin (Burmese: ကာချင်း; pronounced [kàdʑɪ́ɰ̃]) is a form of Burmese martial song performed during a shield dance; pronounced [kàka̰]). Its purpose is to inspire both the singer and their audience with national spirit and patriotism. It gained prominence during the 14th century Pinya Kingdom.

== History of performance ==
During the tulmultuous period following the Mongol invasions of Burma, increased militarism led to the founding of the Pyatho Horse Riding Festival. During this festival, Myinsaing swordsmen would display their skills by "drawing" against a circular handheld shield called a kar (ကာ). As this developed, people composed songs (သီချင်း) for the kar which came to be known as the kagyin form. A kagyin is sung while performing systematic defensive footwork, a sword in the right hand and a kar in the left.

Kagyin was performed in the context of a shield dance called the kar dance (Burmese: ကာက). During the shield dance, the warriors would dance by raising their arms, waving their feet and walking, jumping and stomping in a circle. They would sing and shout Kagyin songs with the accompaniment of various drums and horns and other instruments. During the late Bagan Kingdom, it was primarily accompanied by gongs and cymbals.

Kagyins were first performed in 1312 during the reign of Thihathu. The form further developed in the Pinya Kingdom under Kyawswa I.

== Format ==
A kagyin does not use four syllables in each line, unlike the classical Burmese verse from which it is derived.

As a yadu is sometimes written between the verses of luta poetry, a thanbauk can be written into a kagyin.

Pinya period Kagyin used imagery of strength, invoking images of moats and warrior kings. They also invoked imagery from the war against the Mongols and Chinese. Kagyin poetry also utilised humour, such as mocking "modest" women flaunting golden clothes.

=== Subject ===
Most kagyin describe the beauty of the three seasons, seasonal flowers, and the development of the state, as in egyin and angyin.

== Notable composers and works ==
The Myinsaing Shwepyi kagyin of Kyawswa I of Pinya is most well-known today. It is assigned to 11th graders studying Burmese literature and poetry.

== See also ==
- Burmese literature
