= U Din Kyaw Khaung =

Burmese general

- Native name: ဥဒိန်ကျော်ခေါင်
- Died: 1762 Near Chiang Mai
- Allegiance: Burma
- Rank: Bo
- Awards: Zawana Yakkha Kyaw Khaung (ဇဝနယက္ခကျော်ခေါင်)

Bo U Din Kyaw Khaung (Burmese: ဥဒိန်ကျော်ခေါင်; ? — 1762) was a Burmese general during the Konbaung Dynasty. In the Burmese history he is said to have continued fighting after his own death. His story was recorded in the historical work known as Tazzattadipani (တဇ္ဇတ္ထဒီပနီ) by the minister Maha Zaya Thinkha, and also in U Pyaw's Palateser égyin.

== Biography ==
During the reign of King Naungdawgyi, U Din Kyaw Khaung joined the army as the commander of Ngabatchaung and set out to attack Chiang Mai, but died on the way in March 1762. Legend says that he became a nat (a ghost or spirit) after his death and approached the sleeping king one night, shaking the royal leg to awaken his liege and saying that, even though he had died on the road, he wanted to continue carrying out his duty. The king accepted.

The outpost in Mottama was reported to have been attacked by the forces of Siam, and cavalry scouts were sent to the area. When they did not return for several days, the king sent U Din Kyaw Khaung to investigate. He returned the same day and claimed that the Siamese forces had not attacked and that the outpost was secure.

King Naungdawgyi did not believe it. U Din Kyaw Khaung then said that he saw the king's cavalry scouts camped near Khapaung Creek in Taungoo. The scouts soon returned, reporting that Mottama had not been attacked and they had been able to set up camp in Taungoo.

Rejoicing, the king asked U Din Kyaw Khaung to show himself and offered a royal title in exchange for his service. The ghost replied that he did not dare to manifest his spiritual body because it was so badly damaged and frightening. Instead the king inscribed a gold plate with the ghost's name and new royal title — Zawana Yakkha Kyaw Khaung (ဇဝနယက္ခကျော်ခေါင်, "Swift Ghost [or Demon] Kyaw Khaung") — and gave it to him.
