= Ngwe Tar Yi =

Burmese Poet

- ငွေတာရီ
- Born: Khin Yi; 6 February 1925; Rangoon, British Burma
- Died: 19 March 1959 (aged 34)
- Education: No.2 Basic Education High School, Yangon
- Occupations: Writer; poet
- Spouse: Min Yu Wai
- Writing career
- Notable awards: Literary Translation Award (now National Literature Award); Poetry Prize (now National Literature Award).

‌Ngwe Thar Yi (Burmese: ငွေတာရီ; born Khin Yi (ခင်ရီ), 6 February 1925 – 19 March 1959) was a Burmese poet and writer.

== Early life and education ==
Ngwe Tar Yi was born in Rangoon, British Burma on February 16, 1925 and given the birth name Khin Yi. Her father was British U Nyunt and her mother was Daw Chit Tin. She was the third of five siblings.

As a teenager she studied at the Myoma High School for girls in Rangoon. At 12 years old, she learned the poems of Zaw Gyi. At 14 years old in 1939, she dropped out of school for medical reasons. After dropping out, she studied ancient Burmese literature with Maung Thuta (Major Ba Thaung) and English literature with Mrs. Mannroo.

== Careers ==
Yi began to write poetry when she was 15 years old. At 18 years old in 1943, she began writing in the Tatthit Handbook, which was published by young people in the Tamwe area. Then, she started publishing poetry and entered the literary world. Both her mother and father passed away that same year.

In the journals Dudo and Yu Waddy, she wrote vice-versa poems with one of her friends, MP Khin Pu (pen name Ngwe Wutt Yi), the daughter of Dudo U Ba Cho. Ngwe Wutt Yi died earlier than Ngwe Tar Yi. After her death, she wrote poem for her friend.

In 1944, she published Minn Sayy Yay Pell Mhuan Thalarr and kabyaarshe Short Novel (မင်ဆေးရည်ပဲ မှုန်သလားနှင့် ကဗျာရှင်ဝတ္ထုတို) and in 1947, she published the Malala Myaing Poems Book. In 1948, she visited India. Ngwe, in partnership with her husband published a book of Yadanar poems in 1954. In the same year, she received the Literary Translation Award (now called the National Literature Award) for her book Kabarkyaw aehswat Stories (ကမ္ဘာကျော် အီစွတ်ပုံပြင်များ စာအုပ်) in conjunction with her husband Min Yu Wai.

She wrote four poetry books. The 100 Poems of Ngwe Tar Yi was published in 1960. She also won the Poetry Prize (now also called the National Literature Award).

Her poems are still used today in middle and high school textbooks.

== Personal life ==
In 1952, she married Min Yu Wai, a writer and the education minister of Insein District, U Win Maung.
