= Ba Lwin =

Ba Lwin မြို့မ ဦးဘလွင်
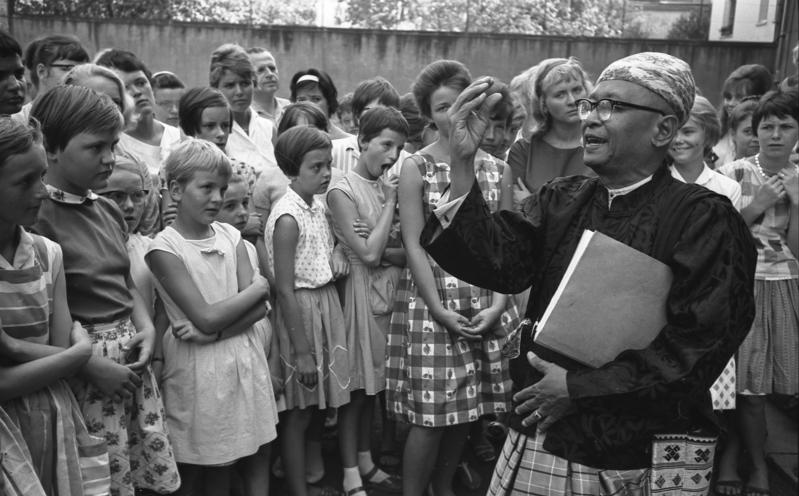
- Ba Lwin visited the Klara Schumann School in Bonn (1 September 1961)
- Born: Ba Lwin; 20 September 1892; Rangoon, Burma
- Died: 7 April 1968 (aged 75)
- Occupation: Headmaster of Myoma National School
- Spouse: Daw Than Nyunt
- Children: 7 sons and one daughter including Capt Thein Lwin; Capt Kyaw Thein Lwin (Navy); Than Lwin (Diplomat); Su Lwin; Prof Yan Naing Lwin
- Parent(s): U Po Thein, Daw Khin

Saya Gyi U Ba Lwin (Burmese: မြို့မ ဦးဘလွင်) was born in Rangoon, Burma on 20 September 1892. He was the headmaster of Myoma National School from 1924 to 1953 after Ngwe Zin and Pho Latt.

Pho Latt and Rangoon University boycotters founded Myoma National High School in 1920.

He was also a Fellow of the Royal Geographical Society.
