= Han Tha Myint =

Burmese politician

- ဟန်သာမြင့်
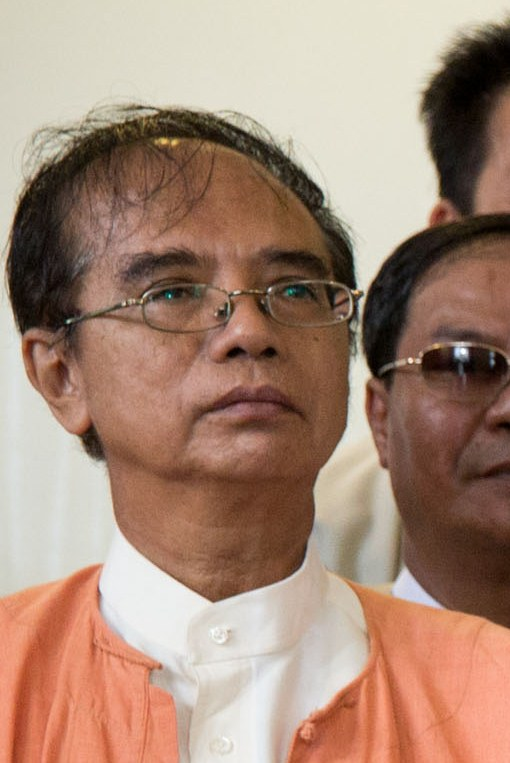
- Han Tha Myint in 2012

Pyithu Hluttaw MP-elect
- Incumbent
- Assumed office Nullified 8 March 2021
- Succeeded by: Than Nwe (USDP)
- Constituency: Budalin Township № 1
- Majority: 16,645 (80.85%)

Personal details
- Born: 7 May 1948 (age 78) Rangoon, Burma
- Party: National League for Democracy
- Parent(s): Thein Pe Myint (father); Khin Kyi Kyi (mother)
- Education: Rangoon Institute of Technology

Han Tha Myint (Burmese: ဟန်သာမြင့်; also spelt Han Thar Myint) is a Burmese politician. He currently serves on the National League for Democracy's Central Executive Committee and is a party spokesman.

Han Tha Myint won the seat in the Pyithu Hluttaw to represent the Budalin Township Constituency No. 1 during the 1990 Burmese general election, winning about 81% of the votes (16,645 valid votes). The Union Election Commission announced his forced resignation from the post on 11 June 1996. In the wake of the 2021 Myanmar coup d'état on 1 February, Han Tha Myint was detained by the Myanmar Armed Forces.

He was born to parents Thein Pe Myint and Khin Khin Kyi on 7 May 1948 in Rangoon, Burma. His father Thein Pe Myint was a prominent Anti-Fascist People's Freedom League leader and a close friend of General Aung San. Han Tha Myint obtained a Bachelor of Engineering degree from the Rangoon Institute of Technology in 1970.
