= Annemarie Esche =

German scholar

Annemarie Esche (29 September 1925 – 13 July 2018) was a German scholar of Burmese literature and linguistics. Following her studies of Burmese as a teacher of German in Burma at the cultural centre of the German Democratic Republic in Yangon from 1955 to 1963, she later became a professor at Humboldt University in Berlin.

Aside from her linguistic publications, she edited several German collections of Burmese literature. She was the widow of Otto Esche (died 2010), with whom she had cooperated in the compilation of a German-Burmese dictionary.

== Life ==
Esche was born on 29 September 1925 in Bockau, Germany, where she attended a nearby high school. In 1959, she and her husband, Dr. Otto Esche, who was also a teacher of German, decided to work abroad in the field of German as a foreign language at the Herder Institute. In 1960, they accepted the institute's proposal to set up the German Democratic Republic (GDR) in Yangon.

Esche became fluent in Burmese. She worked on the 2011 German-Burmese dictionary, published by Buske Verlag Hamburg. In 2013, she was given the Leibniz Medal by the Leibniz Society of Sciences.

Annemarie Esche died in Berlin on 13 July 2018.

== Works ==
- Esche, Annemarie (1968). Der Markt von Pagan. Prosa aus Burma. Berlin: Verlag Volk und Welt.
- Esche, Annemarie (1976). Märchen der Völker Burmas. Wiesbaden: Drei Lilien.
- Esche, Annemarie (1976). Wörterbuch burmesisch-deutsch. Leipzig: Verlag Enzyklopädie.
- Esche, Annemarie (1985). Die Goldene Pagode: Shwedagon, ein Sinnbild des Buddhismus. Hanau/Main: Müller & Kiepenheuer.
- Esche, Annemarie & Eberhard Richter (1988). Burmesisches Übungsbuch. Leipzig. VEB Verlag Enzyklopädie.
- Esche, Annemarie (2005). "The experience of writing the first German-Myanmar dictionary." In Justin Watkins (ed.) Studies in Burmese Linguistics. Canberra: Pacific Linguistics, Research School of Pacific and Asian Studies, the Australian National University: 307-318.
- Esche, Annemarie & Otto Esche (2011). Wörterbuch Deutsch - Myanma. Hamburg: Helmut Buske Verlag.
