= Maung Shwe =

B. L. Goenka, better known as Maung Shwe (Burmese: မောင်ရွှေ [màʊɰ̃ ʃwè]) is the son of Vipassana expert S. N. Goenka and head of the Hindu Central Board in Myanmar. He attended Myoma High School in Yangon.He also is the Chairman of Myanmar-India Merchants' Association.
