= Khin Maung Win (mathematician) =

Burmese academic and mathematician (1940–2021)

- ခင်မောင်ဝင်း
- Born: Khin Maung Win; 23 October 1940; Rangoon, Burma, British Raj
- Died: 3 August 2021 (aged 80)
- Education: Yangon University (MA (math); University of Caen Normandy (PhD)
- Occupations: Mathematics professor, writer
- Known for: Writer
- Notable work: new math and Mathematical Lexicon
- Spouse: Shwe Yi Win
- Children: Maung Yeet; Junior Win
- Parent(s): Khin Maung Lat (father); Khin Myo Chit (mother)

Dr Khin Maung Win (Burmese: ခင်မောင်ဝင်း; also known as Khin Maung Win (Math), 23 October 1940 – 3 August 2021) was a Burmese writer and retired math professor at the Yangon University. He is notable for topics ranging from math teachings and literature and has written many mathematical books in his career. His math books were collected for all school libraries as part of a development project of Myanmar Education.

== Early life and education ==
Khin Maung Win was born on 23 October 1940, in Rangoon, Burma. He was the only son of prominent author Khin Myo Chit and her husband Khin Maung Lat, an author. He graduated with math General Honors BA (Gen. Hons.) in 1956 and MA (Math) in 1966 from Yangon University, and received PhD from the University of Caen Normandy in 1970.

== Personal life ==
Khin married Tatkatho Shwe Yi Win, an author, in 1967. They have twin children, Maung Yit and Junior Win, who is also an author.

== Literary career ==
He is also an author and wrote under the pen name of Khin Maung Win (Math). He has written many books, articles, and mathematical sciences on different topics ranging from math teachings and literature.

Two times a week, he wrote English articles at Working People Daily newspaper from 1987 to 1988. Later in 1990, he wrote articles about his thoughts. Later, he has written articles at the new style, Paduck Pwint Thit and Cherry Magazines.

=== Publications ===
- သင်္ချာသစ် (စာပေဗိမာန်) 1986–1987
- အခြေခံသင်္ချာသစ် (လောကသစ်စာပေ) 1991
- ဂိမ်းသီအိုရီ (ဒေါင်းစာပေ) 2001
- သင်္ချာပညာတော်သင်ဘဝ (ဒေါင်းစာပေ) 2003
- ခေတ်သစ်သင်္ချာ (စိတ်ကူးချိုချို) 2003
- သင်္ချာဝေါဟာရ (မုံရွေးစာပေ) 2003
- အသက်ကိုဖန်တီးခြင်း (ဒေါင်းစာပေ) (တက္ကသိုလ်ရွှေရီဝင်းနှင့်တွဲ၍) 2003
- သင်္ချာအတွေးအခေါ်ဆောင်းပါးများ (ယူနတီ) (တက္ကသိုလ်ရွှေရီဝင်းနှင့်တွဲ၍) 2004
- ဖက်ဇီလောဂျစ် (မုံရွေး) 2004
- ကွန်ပြူတာသုံးသင်္ချာ (မြန်မာ society) 2004
- နဝမတန်းသင်္ချာအကြောင်းသိကောင်းစရာ (ယူနတီ) 2005
- သင်္ချာအဘိဓာန် (ဓူဝံစာပေ) (ဂျူနီယာဝင်း နှင့်တွဲ၍) 2005
- သင်္ချာမိတ်ဆက် (မုံရွှေး) 2005
- သင်္ချာဝေါဟာရ – ၂ (မုံရွေး) 2005
- ဒေးကားမိတ်ဆက် (မုံရွေး) ၂၀၀၆
- ပထမနှစ်သိပ္ပံ (အဝေးသင်) (စိတ်ကူးချိုချို) 2006
- ၁ဝ တန်း သင်္ချာပုစ္ဆာများကို သရုပ်ခွဲလေ့လာနည်း (စိတ်ကူးချိုချို) 2006
- စကြာဝဠာ မိတ်ဆက် (မုံရွေး) (တက္ကသိုလ်ရွှေရီဝင်းနှင့်တွဲ၍) 2006
- ကမ္ဘာနှင့်အိမ်နီးချင်းဂြိုဟ်များ (မုံရွေး) 2007 (တက္ကသိုလ်ရွှေရီဝင်းနှင့်တွဲ၍)
- ရောင်စုံလှစွာပြည်မြန်မာ (ပါရမီ) 2007
- ပညာအလင်းမိတ်ဆက် (မုံရွေး) 2007
- ခေတ်သစ်အတွက်ပညာရေး (မုံရွေး) 2008
- ပညာရှာခြင်းနှင့် မှတ်မိခြင်းမိတ်ဆက် (မုံရွေး) 2008
