= The Botataung =

The Botataung ဗိုလ်တထောင် သတင်းစာ
- Type: Daily newspaper
- Format: Tabloid
- Founded: 1958
- Ceased publication: 1993?
- Language: Burmese
- Headquarters: Botataung, Yangon, Myanmar

The Botataung (Burmese: ဗိုလ်တထောင် သတင်းစာ [bòtətʰàʊɰ̃ ðədɪ́ɰ̃zà]) was a national Burmese language daily newspaper based out of Yangon in Myanmar. The paper, founded in 1958 by Thein Pe Myint, was arguably the leading leftist newspaper prior to its nationalization in 1964 by General Ne Win's government. It became one of four Burmese-language dailies allowed to publish in the 1970s and 1980s although all the papers were owned and controlled by the military government and they all published more or less the same news articles. The Botataung did not survive the military government's cuts in the number of newspapers in the early 1990s.

The Botataung took its name from Yangon's Botataung Township, where its main headquarters was located.

== See also ==
- List of newspapers in Burma
- Media of Burma
