= Moe Hein =

Burmese poet and philanthropist

- Born: 10 December 1942; Burma
- Died: 23 September 2010 (aged 67); Bahan Township, Yangon, Myanmar
- Occupation: Teacher
- Known for: Poetry
- Parent(s): Chit Maung; Journal Kyaw Ma Ma Lay

Moe Hein (Burmese: မိုးဟိန်း; 10 December 1942 – 23 September 2010) was a Burmese poet and philanthropist.

== Biography ==
Moe Hein was born on 10 December 1942, as the youngest son of the journalist and writer Journal Kyaw U Chit Maung and the writer Journal Kyaw Ma Ma Lay. His father was a friend and colleague of the revolutionary nationalist Aung San.

He went to school in Darjeeling, India. His first book was an English translation of Nanda Thein Zan's novel Passing Over Rough Ground. Moe Hein also wrote travelogues, memoirs, a collection of poems and articles on religion.

He contributed a wide variety of articles to journals and magazines between 1961 and 2007, writing under the pen names "Think" and "Son of Journal Kyaw". His lifetime Buddhist philosophy was evident in his 1999 English-language Harmony of Head and Heart.

Moe Hein, his mother and stepfather were among other activist writers and politicians who were detained by the military regime, although later released. Moe Hein worked as a volunteer teaching English in Buddhist monasteries.

He sponsored construction of the Maha Paritta pagoda at Shwegugyi monastery, between Natogyi and Myingyan townships in Mandalay Division. In 2007 he built an orphanage in Pyin U Lwin township, Mandalay Region. He taught at the Pariyatti Sasana University in Yangon. His topics included Buddhist philosophy, ethics and the English language. From 2007 he was an adviser to the Aung Pin Lae environmental magazine.

Moe Hein was diagnosed with throat cancer in December 2009. Writing of the diagnosis in an article called An Open Letter to the Angel of Death he said "the arrow shot by infirmity, right-hand man of the angel of death, hit me in the throat in late 2008". He died on 23 September 2010 in Bahan Township, Yangon. He was survived by his wife, a son and a daughter.

His final book of poems, Midnight Rainbow, was published in February 2011 by Hkakabo Sarpay. Most of the 58 poems had been published in The Light of English or The International magazines.

== Bibliography ==
- 1983 Through Life's Perils by Nandar Thein Zan (translation)
- 1999 Harmony of Head and Heart, English, Poetry anthology
- 2002 Sweet Scent of Padauk and Dockchampa, Anthology
- First Turning Point, anthology of articles and poetry
- Mind and Concise Vipassana by Pegu's Dr. Ashin Pyin Nyeint Thara (translation)
- 2010 An Outside Dream, travelogue based on his visit to the University of Iowa in the United States
- 2011 Midnight Rainbow (English) poetry anthology
