= Thanbauk (poetic form) =

Thanbauk (Burmese: သံပေါက်, pronounced [θàɰ̃ baʊʔ]) is a Burmese form, consisting of three lines of four syllables each. Traditionally, they are witty and epigrammic.

The rhyme is on the fourth syllable of the first line, the third syllable of the second, and on the second syllable of the third.

Here is a modern example by Tin Moe:

Burmese	Transcription	English translation
ဧည့်သည်ကြီး	Èthegyi	The Great Guest (1959)
ဆေးလိပ်လဲတို	Hsay leik lè to	Cigar's burnt down
နေလဲညိုပြီ	Nei lè nyo bi	The sun is brown
ငါ့ကိုပြန်ပို့ကြပါလေ	Nga go pyan po gya ba lei	Will somebody take me home?
