= Than Kywe =

Myoma U Than Kywe မြို့မ-ဦးသန်းကြွယ်
- Born: Than Kywe; 26 December 1924; Thongwa Township, Rangoon, British Burma
- Died: 22 September 1983 (aged 58); Rangoon, Burma
- Citizenship: Burmese citizenship
- Occupations: Burmese politician, President of the All Burma Students' Union, Member of central executive committee of the AFPFL
- Spouse: Myint Myint Win
- Children: Khin Mar Kywe, Htay Kywe, Mya Mya Than and Myint Kywe
- Parent(s): U Sein and Daw Sein Kyawt

Myoma Than Kywe (Burmese: မြို့မ သန်းကြွယ်, pronounced [mjo̰ma̰ θáɰ̃ tɕwɛ̀]; 26 December 1924 – 22 September 1983) was a Burmese politician. He was one of the negotiators of the historical Panglong Conference. The signing of Panglong Agreement is now celebrated as a national holiday, Union Day, in Myanmar.

== Biography ==
He was born in Thongwa, British Burma on 26 December 1924 to Daw Sein Kyawt and U Sein. Educated at Rangoon University, Than Kywe was a representative at the Panglong conference with General Aung San that initiated the formation of the new nation of Union of Burma in February 1947. Myoma U Than Kywe was the president and vice-president of All-Burma Students Union (ABSU) from 1946 to 1948. He led the ceremony of the First Burmese Martyrs' Day on 20 July 1947 in Rangoon.

Than Kywe was married to Daw Ama (also known as Myint Myint Win). The couple had two sons and two daughters. Their youngest child is Myoma Myint Kywe, a writer and historian.

He died on 22 September 1983.

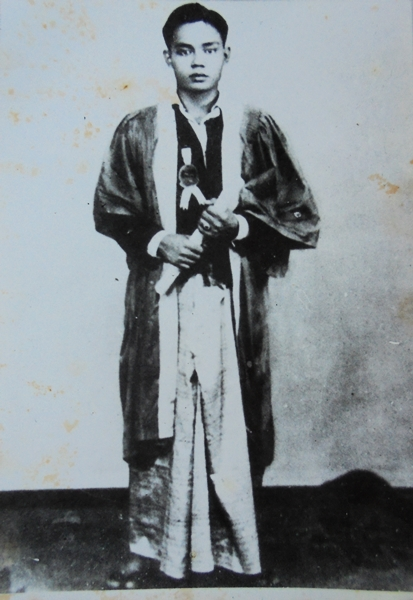
Myoma U Than Kywe at Panglong Conference
