= James Hla Kyaw =

- လှကျော်
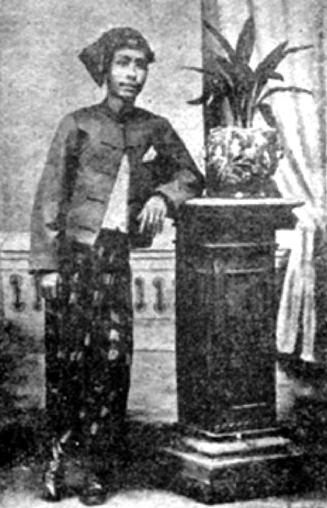
- Born: Hla Kyaw; 1866
- Died: 1919 (aged 52–53); Meiktila, British Burma
- Occupations: Novelist, Lawyer, Translator
- Known for: Maung Yin Maung, Ma Me Ma
- Spouses: Khin Htay Ngwe; Min Tha

James Hla Kyaw (1866-1919), also known as U Hla Kyaw (Burmese: ဦးလှကျော်), was a pioneer Burmese novelist and author of the first Burmese novel titled Maung Yin Maung, Ma Me Ma. Burmese novels had existed before but they were written in verse not in prose. Most of these novels were based on Buddhism, myth and legend and history of Burma; therefore there were no novels that were based on everyday lives like Maung Yin Maung, Ma Me Ma.

== Personal life and death ==
Born in 1866 to a Buddhist family, James Hla Kyaw converted to Christianity after his parents died when he was young, and he was sent to live with his uncle's family who were also Christian converts. James Hla Kyaw was a bright student at school, and he went on to pass many examinations including law. He married four times. His first wife was Ma Khin Htay Ngwe with whom he had two children but later separated. He had no children with his second or third wife, and he died while he was married to his fourth wife, Ma Min Thar. He reverted to Buddhism later in his life after he had studied the Buddha's teachings.

He worked as a bank manager, and a mayor in towns, Sagaing, Chaung-U, Budalin. James Hla Kyaw's health deteriorated while he was working as a provincial mayor in Myinmu, a provincial town north of Mandalay. He returned to Rangoon to seek medical treatment but his health continued to deteriorate; therefore, he retired at the age of 37. He decided to write Maung Yin Maung, Ma Me Ma while living in Sint O Dan, Rangoon. He wrote several articles in the Hanthawaddy, the Friend of Burma and the Burma Critics Newspapers. His health turned for the worse after he suffered a stroke. He still could not move his left arm, even after he had recovered. Following his doctor's advice he later moved to a warmer place, Meiktila in Upper Burma, where he died at the age of 53.

== Life as a writer ==
He started writing Maung Yin Maung, Ma Me Ma while he was in Rangoon. Although the novel was actually a translation of Alexandre Dumas, père's The Count of Monte Cristo, it was more an 'adaptation' than a direct translation as he created his own characters and blended into the story Burmese culture and beliefs. While, Dumas's protagonist took revenge on all those who had mistreated him in the novel, James Hla Kyaw's hero Maung Yin Maung forgave them all, as should be done according to the teachings of the Buddha. The settings were completely different just as the characters were. His novel became a best-seller as Burma's first romantic novel. It was first published in 1904 at No. 71, Phayre Street by Friend of Burma Press with 12 black and white photographs and has since been reprinted six times. Today, over 100 years later, the first novel ever published in Burma is set to hit the big screen. The Moe Kaung Kin Movie Production Company has taken on the task of turning the much-loved Burmese classic into a cinematic masterpiece. Screenplay writer Aung Soe Oo said he and the others had agreed to pay royalty for the book, even though they were not obliged to; a novel or the work of an artist becomes public domain 50 years after the death of its author in Burma. He also stated that to honour the author, they had decided to give a royalty cheque to his next-of-kin in any case. James Hla Kyaw's granddaughter Daw Khin Htar Oo, who lives in Mandalay, would receive the sum of K300,000 (about US$300).

Besides being a writer, James Hla Kyaw enjoyed huge success as a lawyer and translator. He wrote several articles and law books after completing the novel Maung Yin Maung, Ma Me Ma, an extract from which is included in the newly revised prescribed text for matriculation students as part of Burmese literature. Unfortunately, most of his other novels were destroyed by a great fire during the Second World War and only his first novel survived to this day. He was widely known and remembered today as a great novelist. James Hla Kyaw had suffered from chronic illnesses since he was young, but he never gave up and Burma owes its first novel to him.

== See also ==
- Literature of Burma
