= Min Yu Wai =

Burmese writer (1928–2021)

Saya Min Yu Wai
- မင်းယုဝေ
- Born: Win Maung; 26 October 1928; Kangyidaunt, Irrawaddy Division, Burma, British Raj
- Died: 29 July 2021 (aged 92)
- Education: Rangoon University, London University and College in Africa
- Occupation: Writer
- Spouse: Ngwe Tar Yi
- Children: Khin Yi Win
- Parent(s): Tun Sien (father); Thin (mother)
- Writing career
- Language: Burmese
- Notable awards: Myanmar National Literature Award (1954, 1972, 2011)

Min Yu Wai (Burmese: မင်းယုဝေ; born Win Maung 26 October 1928 – 29 July 2021) was a prolific Burmese writer. He was awarded the 2011 Burma National Literature Award for lifetime achievement on 14 December 2012.

== Early life and education ==
Win Maung, the youngest of eight siblings, was born in Kangyidaut, Irrawaddy Division, British Burma, on 26 September 1927, to U Tun Saine and Daw Thin.

He was educated at Min Kone School, Kandawgyi Township in 1934, Pathein National High School in 1935, a Japanese school in 1941 and Kandawgyi Modern High School in 1942. From 1946 to 1951, he attended Rangoon University, graduating with a Bachelor of Arts degree.

In 1955 and 1956, he attended University of London, studied Oriental and at College in Africa, studied Dictionaries.

== Careers ==
He served as the Senior staff officer of the Ministry of Information (1951) and as Insein District Superintendent (1952) and in 1953 as a librarian at the Department of Literature and the 1954 Assistant Professor at the Yangon University Translating and Publishing Department.

After returning from London as a foreign studies student, he worked as an assistant editor at the Yangon University Translation Center. From 1960 to 1968, he served as editor in charge of Ngwe Tar Yi Magazine.

He previously served as the chief editor at Myat Mingalar Journal from 1985 and at Mingalar Maung Mal Journal from 1989 until his death.

== Awards ==
Year	Award	Category	Work	Result
1954	Myanmar National Literature Award	Sarpay Beikhman translation award	Aesop's Fables	Won
1972	Myanmar National Literature Award	collection of poems	"Water Fetching Time"	Won
2011	Myanmar National Literature Award	lifetime achievement		Won

== Personal life and death ==
In 1952, he married Ngwe Tar Yi. They had one daughter, Khin Yi Win.

Min Yu Wai died of COVID-19 on 29 July 2021, at age 92.
