= Dagon Khin Khin Lay =

- ဒဂုန် ခင်ခင်လေး
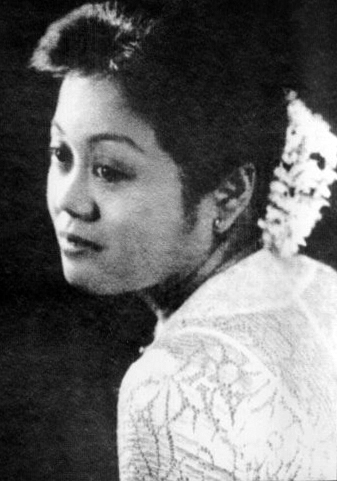
- Born: 20 February 1904; Mandalay, British Burma
- Died: 23 June 1981 (aged 77); Yangon, Burma
- Occupations: Writer, publisher
- Spouse: Ohn Khin
- Writing career
- Period: Early 20th century
- Genres: literary fiction, memoir, Horror novels, Biographical novels, short stories

Dagon Khin Khin Lay (Burmese: ဒဂုန် ခင်ခင်လေး [dəɡòʊɰ̃ kʰɪ̀ɰ̃ kʰɪ̀ɰ̃ lé]; 20 February 1904 – 23 June 1981) was a Burmese novelist, screenwriter, and cinematographer. Founder of Dagon Publishing Company, Khin Khin Lay, along with Journal Kyaw Ma Ma Lay and Ludu Daw Amar, she was one of the few female publishers in Burma.

== Biography ==
Khin Khin Lay was born Khin Lay Latt (ခင်လေးလတ် [kʰɪ̀ɰ̃ lé laʔ]) in Mandalay to Khin Khin Latt and Myat Kyaw, a police officer. Khin Khin Lay was only 12 when she won a literary award competition with her first novel Nwe Nwe in 1917. At 18, she published Kyi Daw Zet magazine in Mandalay. She founded Dagaon magazine and started writing under the penname "Dagon Khin Khin Lay". She also wrote horror novels as "Ko Ko Lay" and the political literature as "Yuwati Lay Ni". She was also a founder of Burma Women Writers Association.

Khin Khin Lay was married to a fellow journalist and publisher of Bama-Khit newspaper, Ohn Khin. She died on 23 June 1981 in Yangon. She was 77.

== Works ==
=== Novels ===
- Nwe Nwe (1917)
- Chit Min Nyo
- Ye Lyin Min Phyit
- Gon Myint Thu
- Chit Annawa
- Shwe Son Nyo
- Nge Kyun Khin
- Sarsodaw (1935)
- Sixty Years: Autobiography(1961)
- Kyun Oo Te Than Lat Khon (1972)
- Kabarhlat Saung Ba (1973)
- Wetmasut Biography (1975)
- Yadanarbon Hteit-Tin Hlaing (1979)

=== Cinematography ===
- Sein Yaung Soe
- Chit Sa-No
- Mhya Nat Maung (Cupid)

=== Publishing ===
- Kyi Daw Zet
- Bama Khit Newspaper
- Yuwati Journal
- Yuwati Newspaper
