= Literature about Southeast Asia =

This is an introduction to some of the books and novels written about Southeast Asia.

== General ==
- At war with Asia by Noam Chomsky. Describes the American-Vietnam War, and the bombing campaigns on neighboring countries.
- Democracy by Joan Didion. Set in Southeast Asia (and Hawaii) at the end of the Vietnam War.
- The Quiet American by Graham Greene
- The Ugly American by Eugene Burdick and William Lederer.
- Cœdès, George (1968). Walter F. Vella (ed.). The Indianized States of Southeast Asia. trans.Susan Brown Cowing. University of Hawaii Press. ISBN 978-0-8248-0368-1.
- Lokesh Chandra, & International Academy of Indian Culture. (2000). Society and culture of Southeast Asia: Continuities and changes. New Delhi: International Academy of Indian Culture and Aditya Prakashan.
- R. C. Majumdar, Study of Sanskrit in South-East Asia
- R. C. Majumdar, Suvarnadvipa, Ancient Indian Colonies in the Far East, Vol.II, Calcutta,
- R. C. Majumdar, India and South-East Asia, I.S.P.Q.S. History and Archaeology Series Vol. 6, 1979, ISBN 81-7018-046-5.
- R. C. Majumdar, History of the Hindu Colonization and Hindu Culture in South-East Asia; Ancient Indian colonisation in South-East Asia; Hindu Colonies in the Far East, Calcutta, 1944, ISBN 99910-0-001-1
- Daigorō Chihara (1996). Hindu-Buddhist Architecture in Southeast Asia. BRILL. ISBN 90-04-10512-3.
- Panikkar, K. M. (1953). Asia and Western dominance, 1498-1945, by K.M. Panikkar. London: G. Allen and Unwin.

== Cambodia ==
- Pol Pot
- The Trial of Henry Kissinger by Christopher Hitchens. Hitchens details the bombing campaigns against Cambodia (amongst others).
- R. C. Majumdar, Kambuja Desa Or An Ancient Hindu Colony In Cambodia, Madras, 1944

== Indonesia ==
- Hidden Agendas by John Pilger
- Rogue State by Noam Chomsky. Both of these detail the attacks on East Timor.
- Hoadley, M. C. (1991). Sanskritic continuity in Southeast Asia: The ṣaḍātatāyī and aṣṭacora in Javanese law. Delhi: Aditya Prakashan.
- Hughes-Freeland, F. (1991). Javanese visual performance and the Indian mystique. Delhi: Aditya Prakashan.

== Malaysia ==
- The Long Day Wanes by Anthony Burgess

== Myanmar ==
- Burmese Days by George Orwell. Orwell served as a police officer in the British Empire and this fueled his contempt for colonialism evident in the book
- Freedom from Fear by Aung San Suu Kyi
- The Heart Must Break by James Mawdsley
- The Land of Green Ghosts by Pascal Khoo Thwe

== Philippines ==
- Noli Me Tangere by Jose Rizal. Sparked the independence struggle from Spanish colonialism.
- El Filibusterismo by Jose Rizal. Sequel to Noli Me Tangere.

== Vietnam ==
- Heroes by John Pilger
- The Quiet American by Graham Greene
- The Sorrow of War by Bao Ninh
- Understanding Vietnam by Neil L Jamiesson
- R. C. Majumdar, Champa, Ancient Indian Colonies in the Far East, Vol.I, Lahore, 1927. ISBN 0-8364-2802-1
