= Saw Wai =

Burmese poet

- စောဝေ
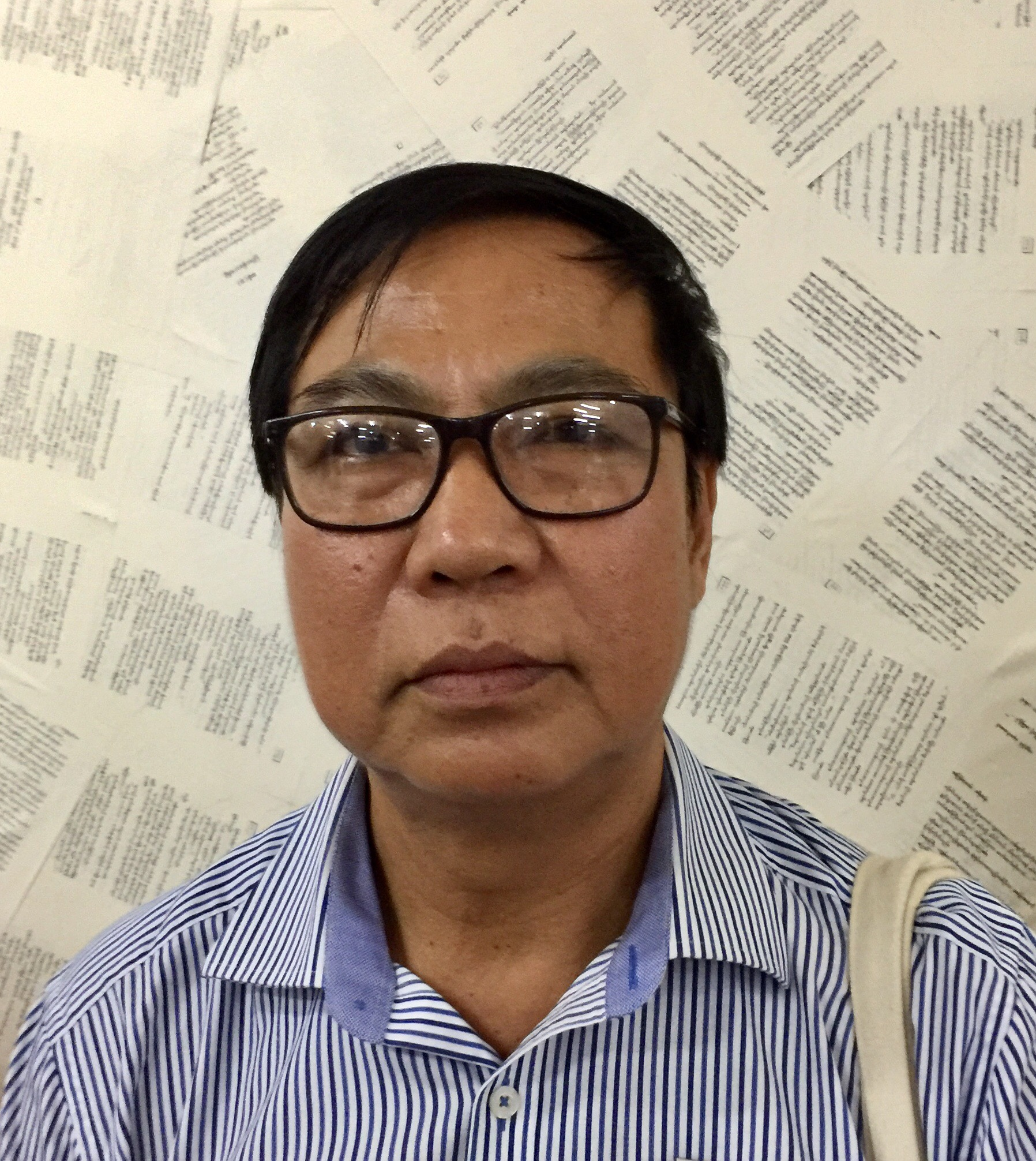
- Burmese poet Saw Wai at Introductory event of Freedom Filmfest Myanmar
- Born: Burma
- Occupations: Poet; performance artist; political activist

Saw Wai (Burmese: စောဝေ, pronounced [sɔ́ wè]), also known as U Saw Wai, is a Burmese poet, performance artist, and political activist. His poems and remarks criticizing the Myanmar military have resulted in his imprisonment, but have also led to international attention and support.

== History ==
Saw Wai began writing poetry at 14 years of age. In 1988, he was fired from his job at the government communication office for taking part in the 8888 Uprising. Until the time of his 2008 arrest, he headed White Rainbow, a group of artists and writers working to raise money for AIDS orphans.

On 22 January 2008, Saw Wai was arrested by Burmese authorities for publishing a poem that secretly criticized Than Shwe, the head of Burma's ruling military junta. The poem, titled "February the Fourteenth" was published in the Rangoon-based Achit Journal (Love Journal). If the first letters of each line of the poem were put together, they read "Power Crazy Than Shwe" in Burmese. On 28 January 2008, Saw Wai's wife, Nan San San Aye tried to see her husband in Insein Prison, but was denied access. On November 11, 2008, Saw Wai was sentenced to 2 years imprisonment for "inducing crime against public tranquility" in publishing the poem mocking Than Shwe.

On May 26, 2010, Saw Wai was released from prison—five months after completing his two-year sentence. In 2013, when Myanmar Center was established, Saw Wai was one of the founding members. He was elected to the board at by-election in 2014, acting as a secretary until 2016.

In 2018, during the height of the Rohingya genocide (violent atrocities against the Rohingya, western Myanmar's mainly Muslim ethnic minority), Saw Wai published an opinion that defended the government's hostile treatment of the Rohingya, urging people to "please stop blaming the military" for the conflict, blaming the Rohingya and questioning the existence of any evidence that Myanmar's military, the Tatmadaw, had killed thousands of Muslims.

In April 2019, at a public rally, Saw Wai read a poem encouraging that amendments be made to Myanmar's Constitution, to limit the military's role in politics. In October, 2019, in response to his comments, a complaint was filed against him by the Myanmar military, in Kawthaung Township Court, alleging defamatory statements. As of late May, 2020, he was still facing trial for incitement—his case drawing international attention, including the headline of an Amnesty International photo essay about political prisoners.
