= Égyin =

Burmese classical poetic form

Égyin (Burmese: ဧချင်း, pronounced [ʔè dʑɪ́ɰ̃]), also spelt eigyin, is a form of Burmese classical poem addressed to a royal child extolling the glory of ancestors. These songs are of significant academic importance, providing historical insight into contemporaneous events and context around the time of their composition.

Égyin is similar to the cradle song. However the main difference is that unlike the cradle song, eigyin is not easily understandable to children as it is about the royal family and their greatness. As égyins revealed the glory of the royals, we can keep track of the history from eigyins. The princes and princesses to whom eigyins composed were noted by the historians as Égyin-Bwe-Khan (ဧချင်းဖွဲ့ခံ).

== Format ==
The verse of Égyin begins and ends with the word "ဧ" (é), and that's why it is called eigyin. In other words, because the poem is sung peacefully and silently (အေး, é), it is called eigyin.

Égyin has four syllables in a line composed with the same devowelizers to rhyme. The way to compose the lead lines is similar to the way of composition in pyo. There are five to sixteen stanzas including the two seven-syllable stanzas at the final line.

From the Inwa period to Konbaung period, the 12 famous old égyins and 40 or 50 new égyins can be found. Rakhine princess (daughter of Ba Saw Byu) égyin and Thakhin Htwe égyin are the oldest ones.

== Notable composers and works ==
The earliest known eigyin is the Rakhine Minthami Eigyin (lit. 'Rakhine Princess Eigyin'), composed by Adu Min Nyo, a royal minister in the Mrauk U court in the 1450s, and the earliest extant palm-leaf manuscript of Burmese poetry. Égyin developed widely in Toungoo dynasty. The popular poet was Nawadegyi who composed king's mother égyin in which he revealed the glory of the ancestors even from the Pyu period. Another one was Min Zeyandameik who composed Minyenara égyin which was about the pleasant 12 months in Toungoo.

== See also ==
- Burmese literature
