= 13 Carat Diamond and Other Stories =

1969 collection of short stories by Khin Myo Chit

- Short story by Khin Myo Chit
- 2nd edition cover
- Genre: Anthology

Publication
- Publication date: 1969 (first edition); October 2005 (second edition)

13 Carat Diamond and Other Stories is a collection of short stories by Khin Myo Chit. It was published in 1969, with a second edition (ISBN 1-933570-52-0) released in October 2005. The collection contains glimpses of the author's life and the culture of Burma, as well as fiction.

The title story, The 13 Carat Diamond, first appeared in The Guardian magazine in 1955, and was later included in 50 Great Oriental Stories, published by Bantam Classics. The story describes the author's own experiences in war-time Burma.

The anthology includes the stories:

1. The 13-Carat Diamond
2. Home-Coming
3. The Golden Princess
4. Electra Triumphs
5. The Ruse
6. The Bearer of the Betel Casket
7. The Egg and I
8. I Believe in Miracles
9. Of Mice and Men
10. Sweet Airs that Give Delight
11. Fortune-Telling is Fun
12. The Late Princess Mindat
13. Why Writers Write
14. A Writer's Prayer
15. The Man Who Twirls His Beard
16. Chit Pe the Lunatic and Money
17. Till the Hair Rots and Falls to the Ground
