= Merguir Bardisbanian =

Merguir Bardisbanian was an Armenian sound engineer, born in Smyrna, in the Aidin Vilayet of the Ottoman Empire on 3 November 1897 and became a naturalized French citizen in December 1929. He trained at the École Centrale Paris, although his instruction was interrupted by World War 1. By 1930, he was a manager of Exploitations cinématographiques in Rueil, France.

== Filmography ==
A graduate of the École Centrale Paris, he worked as chief operator for the French cinema:

- 1932: Live at the heart of Leo and Roger Arnaudy
- 1934: Jean Renoir's Toni
- 1935: Angela dir. Marcel Pagnol
