= Verlag Enzyklopädie =

East-German publishing house (1964–1991)

Verlag Enzyklopädie (English: Publisher Encyclopedia) was an East-German publishing house located in Leipzig. It was founded on 1 November 1956 by the German Democratic Republic (GDR) as a VEB. In 1964, the publishing house was merged with the larger VEB Bibliographisches Institut (BI), with which it had previously cooperated already, but it retained its legal independence.

Verlag Enzyklopädie was originally intended to export works from nationalized encyclopedic publishers, but this plan failed. The publishing house then specialized in languages, its program included dictionaries, grammar books, language textbooks and phrasebooks as well as linguistic magazines. From 1980, this included the Zeitschrift für Anglistik und Amerikanistik (Journal for English and American Studies) and the Zeitschrift für Germanistik (Journal for German Studies).

A complete bibliographic catalog published by the publisher in 1981 listed 800 titles in 60 languages. In 1988, the number of titles published by the 235 employees together with the VEB Bibliographisches Institut was 246, including 121 first editions.

After the German reunification, the publishing houses Enzyklopädie and Bibliographisches Institut were converted into the Bibliographisches Institut & Verlag Enzyklopädie GmbH on 27 June 1990. At the end of May 1991 it was sold to BIFAB Mannheim, and on 1 November 1991 it was resold to Langenscheidt.
