= Ko Ko Thett =

Burmese poet

- ကိုကိုသက်
- Born: 1972 (age 53–54); Rangoon, Burma
- Education: University of Vienna (BA) University of Iowa (MFA)
- Occupations: Poet; writer
- Website: kokothett.com

Ko Ko Thett (Burmese: ကိုကိုသက်; stylised as ko ko thett; born in 1972 in Rangoon) is a poet, poetry translator and editor based in Norwich, United Kingdom. Ko Ko Thett has published poetry collections, anthologies and translations in both Burmese and English. In 1993, Ko Ko Thett enrolled in Yangon Institute of Technology, where he became a founder member of a campus-based samizdat poetry circle. He was detained in 1996 for his involvement in the December 1996 student uprising. Upon his release in April 1997, he left the country for Singapore, and worked for humanitarian organizations in Bangkok (Thailand) and in Europe. He read political science and cultural anthropology at universities in Helsinki (Finland), Vienna (Austria) and Leuven (Belgium) before graduating with a Master of Fine Arts in Creative Writing (Poetry) at the Iowa Writers' Workshop. He was a recipient of the 2012 English PEN Writers in Translation Programme Award for Bones will Crow, an anthology of 15 contemporary Burmese poets, co-edited with James Byrne. Following a residency at the International Writing Program at the University of Iowa in the United States in 2016, and a book tour, he returned to Myanmar in 2017. From 2012 to 2020, Ko Ko Thett was country editor for Myanmar at Poetry International, and from 2017 to 2022, poetry editor for Mekong Review. Ko Ko Thett has been published in Ambit, Asia Literary Review, Bengal Lights, Cyphers, Daedalus, Granta, Griffith Review, PN Review, Poetry London, Portside Review, The Margins, Tripwire, Usawa Literary Review, Washington Square Review, and World Literature Today, among others. His book, Bamboophobia, was shortlisted for the 2022 Walcott Poetry Prize.

== Works ==
- Bones Will Crow: 15 Contemporary Burmese Poets (2012), co-edited with James Byrne, ISBN 9781501756825
- The Burden of Being Burmese (2015), ISBN 9781938890161
- ဖူးဖူးသက်ရဲ့အင်တာနက် မိတ်ဆက်စာမျက်နှာ [Foo Foo Thett’s Page on an Internet Dating Site] (2016)
- လေယူလေသိမ်း [ACCENT] (2018)
- Bamboophobia (2022), ISBN 9781938890857
- Picking off New Shoots will Not Stop the Spring (2022), co-edited with Brian Haman, ISBN 9781913891237
- Autumnal by Aidii translated by Ko Ko Thett (2026), ISBN 978-981-94-7319-9
