= Myoma Myint Kywe =

Burmese writer, including historian (1960–2021)

Myint Kywe မြင့်ကြွယ်
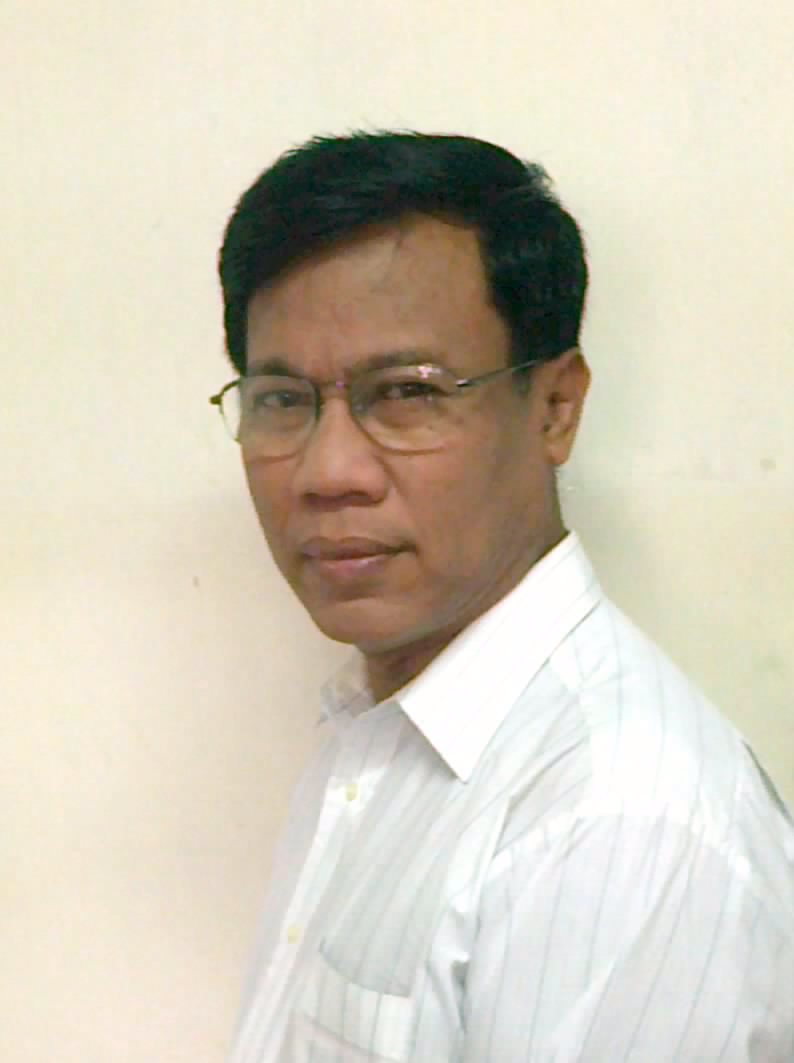
- Myoma Myint Kywe (2014)
- Born: Myint Kywe; 14 April 1960; Yangon (sometimes known as Rangoon), Burma
- Died: 26 July 2021 (aged 61)
- Occupations: Writer, including historian
- Parent(s): Myoma U Than Kywe; Daw Ahmar (a) Myint Myint Win
- Awards: Sarpay Beikman Manuscript Awards (Belles-Letters) First Prize 2003; Myanmar Culture and Fine Arts Literature Prize for 2005

Myoma Myint Kywe (Burmese: မြို့မ-မြင့်ကြွယ်, pronounced [mjo̰ mə-mjɪ̰ɴ tɕwɛ̀]; also U Myint Kywe; 14 April 1960 – 26 July 2021) was a Burmese writer and historian.

== Early life and education ==
He was born in Yangon (sometimes known as Rangoon), Burma, on 14 April 1960, son of Burmese politician Myoma U Than Kywe and Daw Ahmar (a) Myint Myint Win. He was the youngest son of four children.

== Awards ==
He was awarded the Sarpay Beikman Manuscript Awards First Prize for 2003 in the belles-lettres category. In 2007, he was awarded the Myanmar Culture and Fine Arts Literature Prize for 2005.

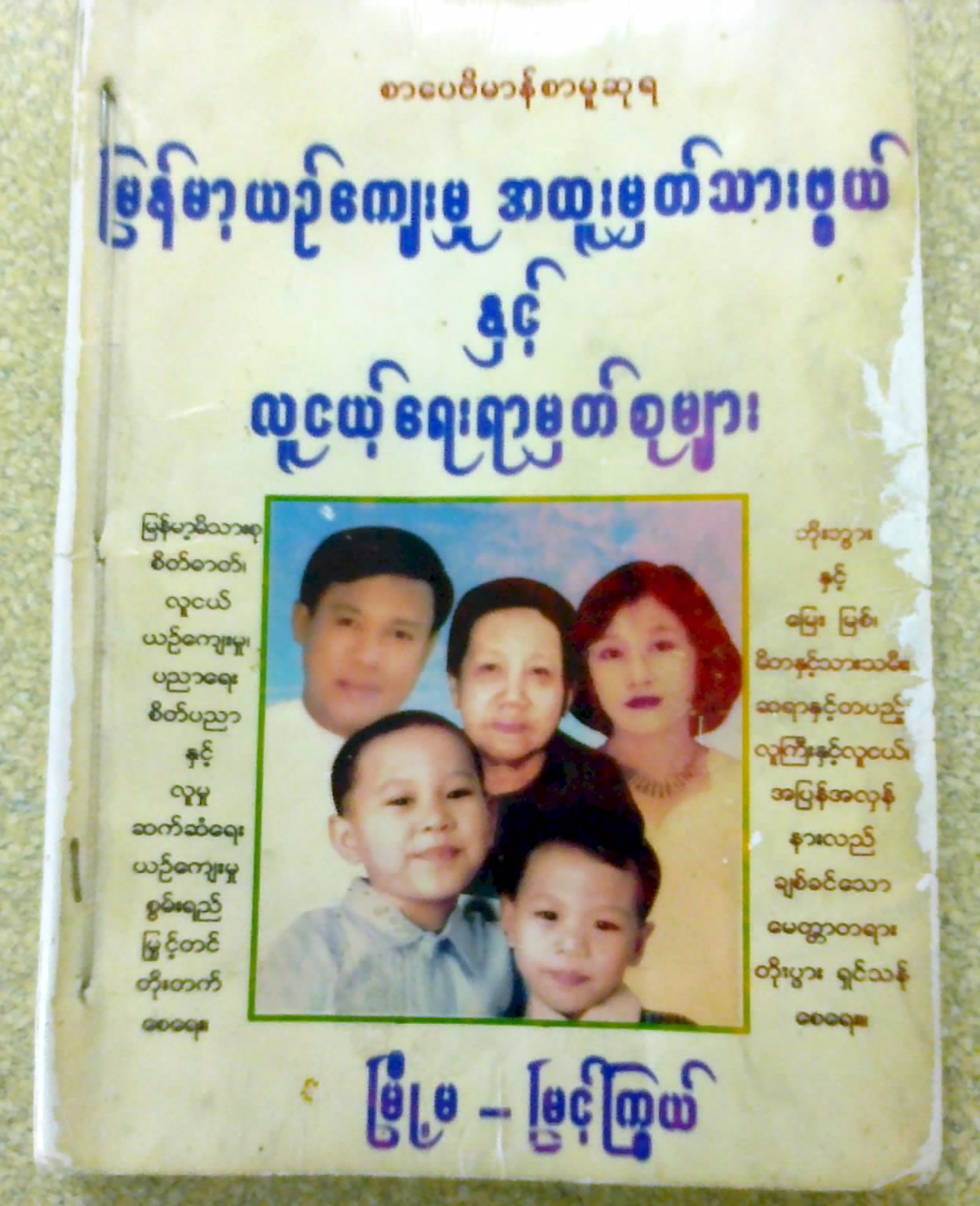
Special Remarkable Notes of Myanmar Culture and Notes on Youth Affairs is one of his books.

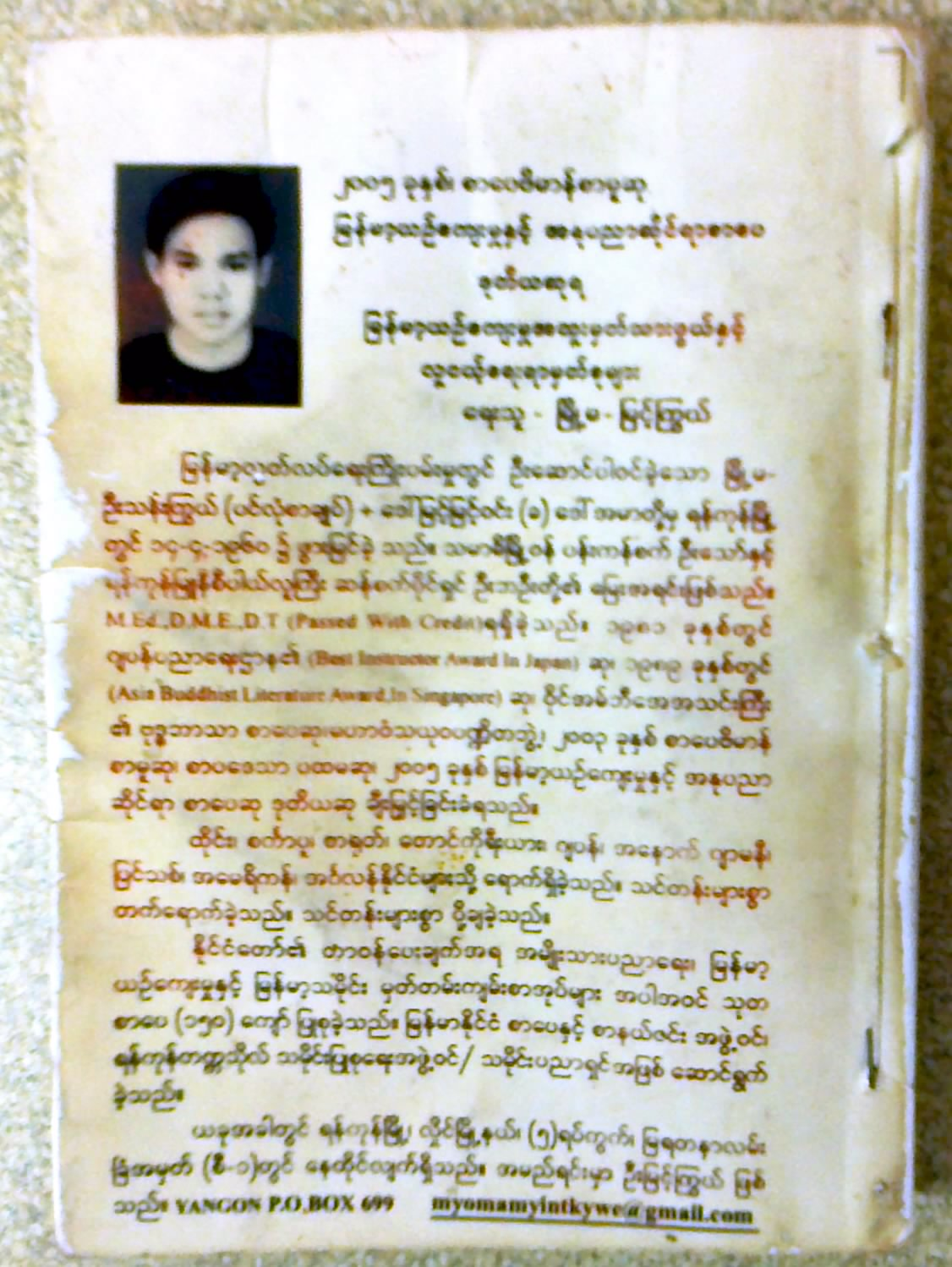
Back cover

== See also ==
- Myoma U Than Kywe
- List of Burmese writers
