= Journal Kyaw Ma Ma Lay =

Burmese writer

- ဂျာနယ်ကျော် မမလေး
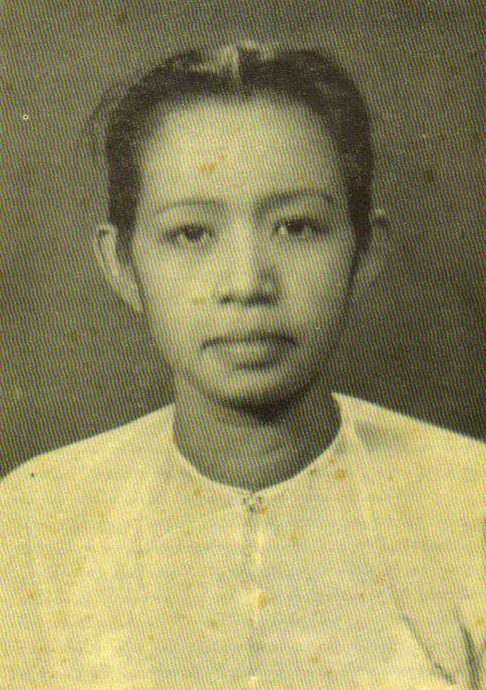
- Journal Kyaw Ma Ma Lay
- Born: 13 April 1917; Kamar Kalu, Bogalay Township, British Burma
- Died: 6 April 1982 (aged 64); Rangoon, Burma
- Resting place: Yayway Cemetery
- Occupations: novelist, publisher, journalist
- Spouse(s): Chit Maung (1938-1946); Aung Zeya (1959-1982)
- Children: Maung Thein Dan; Khin Lay Myint; Moe Hein
- Writing career
- Pen name: Yawe Hlaing; Hla Takhine; Bogalay Ma Tin Hlaing
- Period: 1936-1980
- Genres: Romance, Short story
- Notable works: Thu Lo Lu (Man Like Him) (1947); Mone Ywa Mahu (Not Out of Hate) (1955)
- Notable awards: Myanmar National Literature Award (1955, 1963)

Journal Kyaw Ma Ma Lay (Burmese: ဂျာနယ်ကျော် မမလေး [ma̰ ma̰ léi]; born Tin Hlaing (Burmese: တင်လှိုင်); 13 April 1917 – 6 April 1982) is widely acknowledged as one of the greatest Burmese writers of the 20th century. Her stories are known for authentic portrayals of modern Burmese society. Along with Ludu Daw Amar, Ma Ma Lay was one of a few female authors in Burma. She died in 1982 at the age of 65.

== Personal life ==
Ma Ma Lay was born Tin Hlaing in Kamar Kalu Village, Ayeyarwady Division, Myanmar in 13 April 1917. Her literary career began in 1936 when her article "To Become Knowledgeable Women" was published in the Myanma Alin newspaper. She later married Chit Maung the chief editor of Myanma Alin in 1938. Together, they founded The Journal Kyaw newspaper in 1939. She began writing articles and short stories under the pen name "Ma Ma Lay". After her journal began to be widespread, she began to get regarded with the prefix Journal Kyaw and therefore her new pseudonym, Journal Kyaw Ma Ma Lay

Ma Ma Lay was just 29 when her husband died in 1946, leaving her with two sons and a daughter. Despite being a young widow, Ma Ma Lay displayed her talent and ability as a writer and a publisher. Not only did she not close down the Journal, she published another one named "Pyithu Hittaing" or "The People's Voice Newspaper", in accordance with her husband's last wish.

Unfortunately, she could only run the press only for a few years due to the situation in the country. Troubles began when a group of students destroyed her publishing company's printing house for her papers' perceived leftist slant (and perhaps for her family's ties with leading Marxists like Thein Pe Myint). Not one to back down, Ma Ma Lay continued to publish her two papers by going deeply into debt. Though she was able to repay part of the debts due to the commercial success of her 1947 book Thu Lo Lu (Like Him), she couldn't keep the presses going for long.

Ma Ma Lay continued her career as a writer and was also the president of the Writers Association in 1948, which was most unusual for a female. Traveling the world was not easy for a woman at that time but Ma Ma Lay managed it. She went to India, Japan, China and Russia, attending conferences and touring the countries. She continued writing until the 1970s. She would not get back into the publishing business again but ran a small printing business in the 1950s.

Ma Ma Lay married Aung Zeya in 1959. She died in Yangon on 6 April 1982. She was almost 65.

Her eldest son Maung Thein Dan became an actor. Her daughter was Dr. Daw Khin Lay Myint, a noted French scholar who died in 2007. She translated two of her mother's works into French, and some French classics into Burmese. Her youngest son was the poet Moe Hein.

== Literary career ==
Ma Ma Lay wrote nearly 20 books and many articles and short stories in the monthly magazines. Many of her contemporaries and even younger writers describe her as a genius who could make simple everyday matters into readable, interesting books which reflected the lives and concerns of her readers.

Her famous works are:

- Thu Lo Lu (Like Him) (1947)
- Seik (Spirit)
- Mone Ywa Mahu (Not Out of Hate) (1955)
- Yin Nint Aung Hmwe (Right to the Core of the Heart)
- Twe Ta Saint Saint (A Slow Stream of Thoughts and Burmese Medicine Tales) (1963)
- Thway (Bound by Blood, Bridged by Love) (1973)
- Images of My Life (2002) (Collections of her articles about her life, republished by her son)

Ma Ma Lay won two top Burmese Literary Prizes for "Not Out of Hate" and "A Slow Stream of Thoughts and Burmese Medicine Tales".

- Like Him was about her husband Chit Maung, and their married lives. Contemporary writer Dagon Taya wrote, “The success of Journalgyaw Ma Ma Lay reached its peak with this novel. The wife wrote a biography of her husband, an editor. It was the combination of love and art, and that combination made the book unique and interesting.”
- Not Out of Hate explores the impact of the West on Burmese culture, and it has been translated into other languages (English, Chinese, French, Uzbek and Russian).
- Bound by Blood, Bridged by Love addresses relations forged between the Japanese and the Burmese during World War II. A young Japanese woman visits Burma to find her half-brother, the child of her father, an officer in the Japanese army, and a Burmese mother. Her half-brother initially refuses to have anything to do with her because he believes that his father raped his mother. A joint production with the Japanese turned this novel into a film which had its 2003 premiere in Japan.

== Short stories ==
- Short story collections A Slow Stream of Thoughts and Burmese Medicine Tales investigate different aspects of Burmese society during the U Nu era and the early Ne Win era. As a realistic fictional depiction of society during a certain era, they bear a distinct resemblance to the work of French author Balzac.
- One Blade of Grass depicts a situation in which the rich wife of a military officer treats a child servant like a slave or actually more like a household appliance. There's a lot of hyperbole in the treatment of master-servant relations here, but the story does a good job at bringing out the features of oppression that one often finds in countries where income inequalities are extreme.
- In Far and Near a young woman tries her hand at managing the family rice mill only to learn about every possible form that government corruption as applied to rice millers can take. There's so much realistic detail the story must be at least partially factual. By the end the government officials seem no better than the rats that gnaw through the rice sacks in search of their plunder.
- In Coffee a picture of utter destitution is drawn. Like the story A Little Blade of Grass this story also deals with master-servant relations, but the elderly woman who is the focus of this story doesn't live in the master's house and consume his food. She knows how to defer to the wealth and status of the wealthy neighbors that surround her and cater to their every need, but it does her little good in the end.
- A Pretty Face is a satirical story directed at those young women who abandon traditional Burmese dress for western fashions and make-up and those young men who are always working for their own advantage.
- Kheimari is about a young girl whose parents die and who is drawn gradually towards life as a Buddhist nun, but once she becomes a nun she is forced into a life as a professional beggar. A popular film was made based on this short story.
- This Heat is about the misery and grief of an old unmarried woman who works like a maid doing the work of a wife for her older unmarried father.
- In the short story A Slow Stream of Thoughts a woman's husband and her son-in-law both take second wives. She writes of all the suffering that the old woman has to bear because of her daughter and grandchildren.
- Danger of Rebirth (or "Samsara Danger" or "Cycle of Rebirth Danger") is the story of how an office clerk becomes a monk after his second marriage fails.
- In the short story Please Don't Emulate This, Sir a newly married husband gets trapped by all the comforts of married life. He wakes up late in the morning and eats the food that his wife prepares for him, while his wife wakes up at the crack of dawn, cooks, and goes off to work selling boiled beans and rice.

== Translations ==
- Ma Ma Lay (Margaret Aung-Thwin tr.) (1991) Not Out of Hate: A Novel of Burma, Monographs in international studies southeast Asia series; No. 88, Ohio: International Studies Ohio University, 1991, ISBN 0-89680-167-5.
- Ma Ma Lay (Than Than Win tr.) (2006) Blood Bond [Burmese: Thway], Center for Southeast Asian Studies, Hawaii: University of Hawaii. [Also translated into French by Ma Ma Lay's daughter Khin Lay Myint]
- "Images of My Life" (2002)
- Bound by Blood, Bridged by Love (2026)

== Life as a Burmese traditional medicine practitioner ==
Ma Ma Lay was a practitioner of traditional Burmese medicine. Her interest in traditional medicine began after her family's poor experience with Western medicine. In 1945, her seven-year-old daughter's leg operation was botched by a British Army doctor. In 1946, her husband suddenly died within 12 days of uncertain cause.

Ma Ma Lay studied traditional Burmese medicine for 15 years under Saya Hlaing (open at No.20, Kyaik Latt Street, Sanchaung township, Yangon), and opened a clinic in Yangon. She traveled frequently to other regions and treated patients with tuberculosis, cancer, high blood pressure, hepatitis B, leprosy, diabetes, paralysis, mental disease, dropsy, elephantiasis.

Ma Ma Lay was said to have cured her youngest brother Tin Win of VD Venereal Disease in three months. Later, Tin Win too studied Burmese medicine and became a traditional medicine practitioner in Mandalay.
