= Hmawbi Saya Thein =

- Born: Po Thein: 31 March 1862; Monday, 2nd waxing of Late Tagu 1223 ME; Hmawbi, Hinthada District, British Burma
- Died: 1 January 1942 (aged 79); Thursday, 1st waning of Pyatho 1303 ME; Hmawbi, Burma
- Occupation: Writer
- Writing career
- Period: early 20th century
- Genres: history, culture

Hmawbi Saya Thein (Burmese: မော်ပီဆရာသိန်း, pronounced [mɔ̀bì sʰəjá θéiɰ̃]; 31 March 1862 – 1 January 1942) was a Burmese writer, known for his articles on Burmese culture and history.

In his travels around the country Thein collected many historical artifacts, manuscripts, traditions and oral history related to Burmese history and culture. Based on his research and collection, he wrote many articles about Burmese culture and history in magazines in colonial Burma. Many of the articles were later collected, some posthumously, and published in book form.

== Works ==
- A Crazy Man's Shoulder Bag: A collection of anecdotes that used to be required reading in the school curriculum.
- An Oral Chronicle: Purported oral history passed down from father to son about events in the court of King Bagyidaw of the Konbaung Dynasty.

== Bibliography ==
- Soe Nyunt, ed. (2014). "Hmawbi Saya Thein". ၂၀ရာစု မြန်မာစာရေးဆရာ ၁၀၀ (အတ္ထုပ္ပတ္တိ အကျဥ်း) [100 20th-century Burmese Writers (Abridged Biographies)] (in Burmese). Vol. 3. Yangon: Ya-Pyei Publishing. pp. 4–6.
- Thaw Kaung (2003-02-01). "Lagunbyee Old Town and the Discovery of the First Ceramic Kiln". Myanmar Perspectives. Archived from the original on 2004-12-31.
