= Chit Maung =

Myanmar journalist and writer

Journal Kyaw U Chit Maung
- ချစ်မောင်
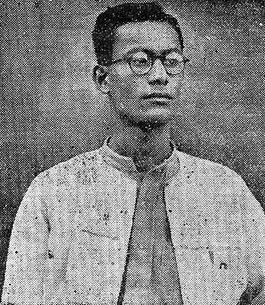
- Born: 1913; Okpho, Thayarwady District, British Burma
- Died: 1945 (aged 31–32); Burma
- Resting place: Yayway Cemetery
- Occupation: Journalist
- Known for: Founder of the Journal Kyaw Newspaper
- Spouse: Journal Kyaw Ma Ma Lay
- Children: Maung Thein Dan; Khin Lay Myint; Moe Hein

Journal Kyaw U Chit Maung (Burmese: ဂျာနယ်ကျော်ဦးချစ်မောင်, MLCTS: hkyac maung; 1913–1945) was a journalist and patriotic writer of Burma / Myanmar. He worked for Bogyoke Aung San, the father of Burmese politician Aung San Suu Kyi. He was Chief Editor of New Light of Burma:. Later his own Journal Kyaw Newspaper (The Weekly Thunderer) became well known in Burma.

Chit Maung was born in Okpho, Thayarwady District, and studied at Latpatan Town High School. After he passed high school, he started work for Rangoon newspapers and became newspaper. He wrote political novels with the pen name Shwe Lin Yon and adult education novels with the pen name "Thu".

Later, Chit Maung set up his own newspaper called Journal Kyaw Newspaper (ဂျာနယ်ကျော်သတင်းစာ). Its patriotic writing style for the Burmese working class attacked the ruling British colonial government. After World War II, he started Burmese independence activities and was arrested by the British government. He actively participated in Aung San's Anti-Fascist People's Freedom League. Due to poor health, he died at the age of 34 years. He is still considered as a role model journalist in Myanmar. His wife Journal Kyaw Ma Ma Lay wrote her husband's biography, Thu Lo Lu (သူလိုလူ), which was translated into English as A Man Like Him and published.

Journal Kyaw U Chit Maung's eldest son Maung Thein Dan became an actor. His daughter was Dr. Daw Khin Lay Myint, a noted French scholar who died in 2007. She translated her mother's works into French, and some French classics into Burmese. His youngest son was the poet Moe Hein.
