= Nanda Thein Zan =

Burmese writer and philosopher

- Born: 21 February 1947; Paungde Township, Pegu Division, British Burma
- Died: 14 August 2011 (aged 64); Yangon, Myanmar
- Education: Rangoon University
- Occupations: Academic, writer
- Known for: Philosophical writings
- Title: Maha Thaddama Zawtika
- Awards: Sayawun Tin Shwe Award

Nanda Thein Zan (Burmese: နန္ဒာသိန်းဇံ; 21 February 1947 – 14 August 2011) was a well-known author from Burma who wrote on philosophy and Buddhism.

Zan was born on 21 February 1947 in Paungde Township of Pegu Division, the youngest of three siblings. At an early age he began writing under the pen name "Thein Zan" in the Thit Bawa Magazine. His first article was on Memory and Thought, appearing in the November 1963 issue. Later he changed his pen name to "Nandar Thein Zan" to avoid confusion with another writer publishing under the name "Thein Zan". He studied at the University of Rangoon, obtaining a BA degree in 1966 and a master's degree in philosophy in 1968. His master's thesis was on Definition and Truth of Life.

Starting in 1969, Nanda Thein Zan published at least 18 books about philosophy and Buddhism. He had a talent for explaining philosophical concepts in easily understood terms. His work included a widely acclaimed collection of lectures he had given at the Rangoon Workers' College published under the title Passing Over Rough Ground. This work was translated into English by the poet Moe Hein. He also wrote well-received books on the economic and military strategies of Chinese philosopher Sun Tzu.

In 1970 Zan obtained a position as a tutor in the philosophy department at the University of Rangoon. Between 1972 and 2003 he also served as a tutor, lecturer and assistant professor at the University of Mawlamyine, Dawei College and Pathein Degree College. In the 1980s and 1990s his work had considerable influence on young people. He was appointed professor and head of the University of Rangoon philosophy department in 2003, holding that position until he retired in 2008. On 1 April 2004 he was honored with the title "Maha Thaddama Zawtika" by the government. In May 2011 he received a Sayawun Tin Shwe Award for his work "Naung-ta-kin-ya-tho".

Zan died in Rangoon on 14 August 2011 after suffering from lung problems. He was survived by his wife, Khin Mar Mar.
