= Aung Thin =

- အောင်သင်း
- Born: 17 April 1927; Taungdwingyi Township, Magway Division, British Burma
- Died: 25 October 2014 (aged 87); Sanchaung Township, Yangon, Myanmar
- Education: Magway College; Rangoon University
- Occupations: Writer; academic
- Years active: 1938 – 2005
- Awards: Lifetime National Literary Award (2012)

Aung Thin (Burmese: အောင်သင်း; 17 April 1927 – 25 October 2014) was a Lifetime National Literary Award-winning writer in Myanmar (Burma) known for his continuous encouragement of youth to become righteous men.

== Biography ==
He was born on 17 April 1927 in Taungdwingyi Township, Magway Region, British Burma.

His first article, Breaking Thayet Prison was printed in Myawaddy Magazine in 1959. He became a tutor at Rangoon University (University of Yangon) in 1962, but he refused to join the Burma Socialist Programme Party. He worked for Mawlamyaing Degree College, Defence Services Academy and the University of Yangon as a lecturer from 1962 to the 1970s.

He wrote more than 50 books on genres of ethical conduct, cultural knowledge and motivation of youth inspiration. He was awarded the lifetime National Literary Award in 2012.

He spoke at over 200 literature talks across local areas, and also overseas, such as Singapore etc.

He was one of the founders of the Free Funeral Service Society of Yangon, together with Thukha and Kyaw Thu in 2001. He died on 25 October 2014 at San Chaung, Yangon.
