= Tun Aung Chain =

Burmese historian and academic

Saw Tun Aung Chain
- ထွန်းအောင်ချိန်
- Born: 1933 (age 92–93); Mergui, British Burma (now Myeik, Myanmar)
- Parent: Ba Than Chain

Academic background
- Education: University of Rangoon; Harvard University

Academic work
- Discipline: Historian
- Sub-discipline: Burmese history
- Institutions: University of Yangon

Saw Tun Aung Chain (Burmese: စောထွန်းအောင်ချိန်) is a Burmese historian and academic at the University of Yangon, known for his scholarship on Burmese history.

== Early life and education ==
Tun Aung Chain was born in 1933, in the southern town of Mergui, British Burma (now Myeik, Myanmar). Tun's father, Ba Than Chain, was a civil surgeon from Bassein (now Pathein). Tun was raised in Bassein, and matriculated from the Kothabyu S'gaw Karen High School, a Christian missionary school, in 1949.

He went onto graduate from the University of Rangoon with a bachelor's degree in history in 1954, winning the Moay Twe Main Gold Medal for standing first in his class. Tun attended Harvard University after graduation on a Rockefeller Foundation Fellowship, earning a master's degree in Oriental studies in 1957.

== Academic career ==
Tun spent the bulk of his academic career at the University of Rangoon, with the exception of a five-year stint at the University of Mandalay. He became a Professor in 1978, and retired in 1993 from the university.

During his career, Tun served as a visiting fellow at a number of universities, including the School of Oriental and African Studies of London University, Cornell University and Chulalongkorn University. He also served in the Myanmar Historical Commission.

Tun's nonfiction book, Broken Glass: Pieces of Myanmar History, won a Sayawun Tin Shwe Award in 2014. In 2018, he was awarded a Myanmar National Literature Award for lifetime achievement, alongside Tin Maung Myint.

== Publications ==
- Shwedagon (1996)
- Selected Writings of Tun Aung Chain (2004)
- Broken Glass: Pieces of Myanmar History (2004)
- Chronicle of Ayutthaya : a translation of the Yodaya Yazawin (2005)
- A Chronicle of the Mons (2010)
- Texts and Images: Glimpses of Myanmar History (2011)
- Flowing Waters: Dipping into Myanmar History (2013)
- The Great Chronicle 1597-1711 by U Kala (translation) (2016)
- Founders (2021)
