= Hsu Shin =

Burmese writer

Maung Hsu Shin
- ဆုရှင်
- Born: Myo Thant; January 1, 1932; Myaungmya, British Burma
- Died: 2 June 2009 (aged 77); North Okkalapa Township, Yangon, Myanmar
- Other names: Maung Kaung Myint; Maung Kyi Phyu; U Ba Khant; Win Thant; Aung Thu
- Education: Rangoon University; Syracuse University; Boston University
- Occupation: Writer
- Awards: Burma National Literature Award (1967, 2002); Thuta Swesone literary award (2006)

Maung Hsu Shin (Burmese: ဆုရှင်), also spelt Maung Su Shin, born Myo Thant, was a prominent Burmese writer, best known for his science works. He attended Myoma High School in Yangon.
