= Kyaw Thet =

Kyaw Thet ကျော်သက်
- Born: 1921; Rangoon, British Burma
- Died: 2008 (aged 86–87)
- Education: University of Rangoon (B.A.); University of London (M.A., Ph.D.)
- Parent: Ba Dun (father)

Kyaw Thet (Burmese: ကျော်သက်, pronounced [tɕɔ̀ θɛʔ]; 1921–2008) was a historian of Burma, and professor of Asian Studies at University of Windsor, Ontario, Canada. He was formerly a professor of Burmese and Eastern History Studies at the University of Rangoon. He is of Burman and Mon descent. Kyaw Thet received his bachelor's degree at the University of Rangoon, and master's degrees at the University of London, and Ph.D from University of London in 1950 with the thesis Burma's Relations with Her Eastern Neighbours In The Konbaung Period. He was also a visiting professor at Yale University.

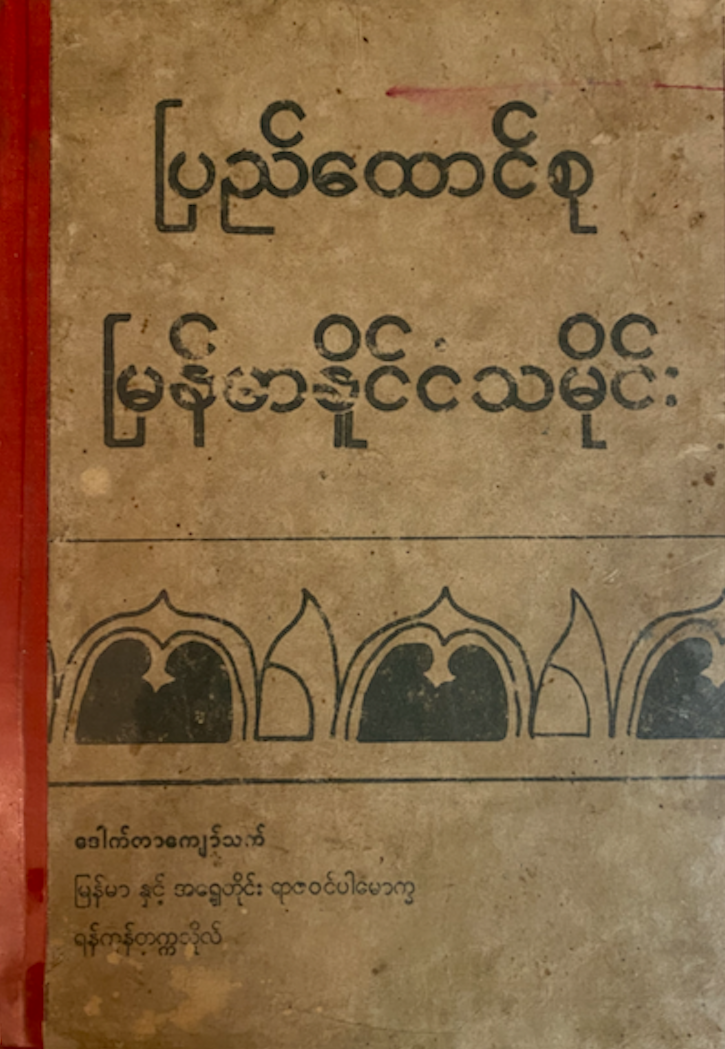
History of the Union Burma, 1962

== Bibliography ==
- Kyaw Thet, U (February 1958). "Continuity in Burma: the survival of historic forces". Atlantic Magazine.
- Kyaw Thet (1962). ပြည်ထောင်စု မြန်မာနိုင်ငံ သမိုင်း [History of the Union of Burma] (in Burmese) (1 ed.). Rangoon: Inwa Taik.
- Maung Wa, Theippan (2009). L. E. Bagshawe; Anna J. Allott (eds.). Wartime in Burma: A Diary, January to June 1942. Ohio University Press. ISBN 9780896802704.
