= Nu Nu Yi =

- နုနုရည်
- Born: 18 May 1957 (age 69); Inwa, Burma
- Education: Mandalay University (BA)
- Occupation: Writer

Nu Nu Yi (Burmese: နုနုရည်, pronounced [nṵ nṵ jì]; also referred to as Nu Nu Yi (Inwa) (နုနုရည် (အင်းဝ)) is a Burmese author. Known for portraying the lives of underprivileged Burmese in her works, she has drawn scrutiny from government censors. Her novel Smile As They Bow (1994), for which she was nominated for the 2007 Man Asian Literary Prize, was censored for more than 12 years. An English version was published in 2008 by Hyperion Est. She was born in a village near Inwa in 1959, and has written 15 novels, 100 short stories and several magazine articles since 1984.

Nu Nu Yi's work is known for its depictions of the underprivileged in Burma; her short stories have included themes such as social injustice, and have, as a result, been censored by the military government. Her writings have been acclaimed, however, by activists such as Aung San Suu Kyi. What Can I Do For You and Emerald Green Blue Kamayut, Myanmar National Literary Award winner for 1993, are also her works. Her books were translated into Japanese. She participated in Iowa International Writing Program in 2000.
