= Khin Myo Chit =

Burmese author and journalist

- ခင်မျိုးချစ်
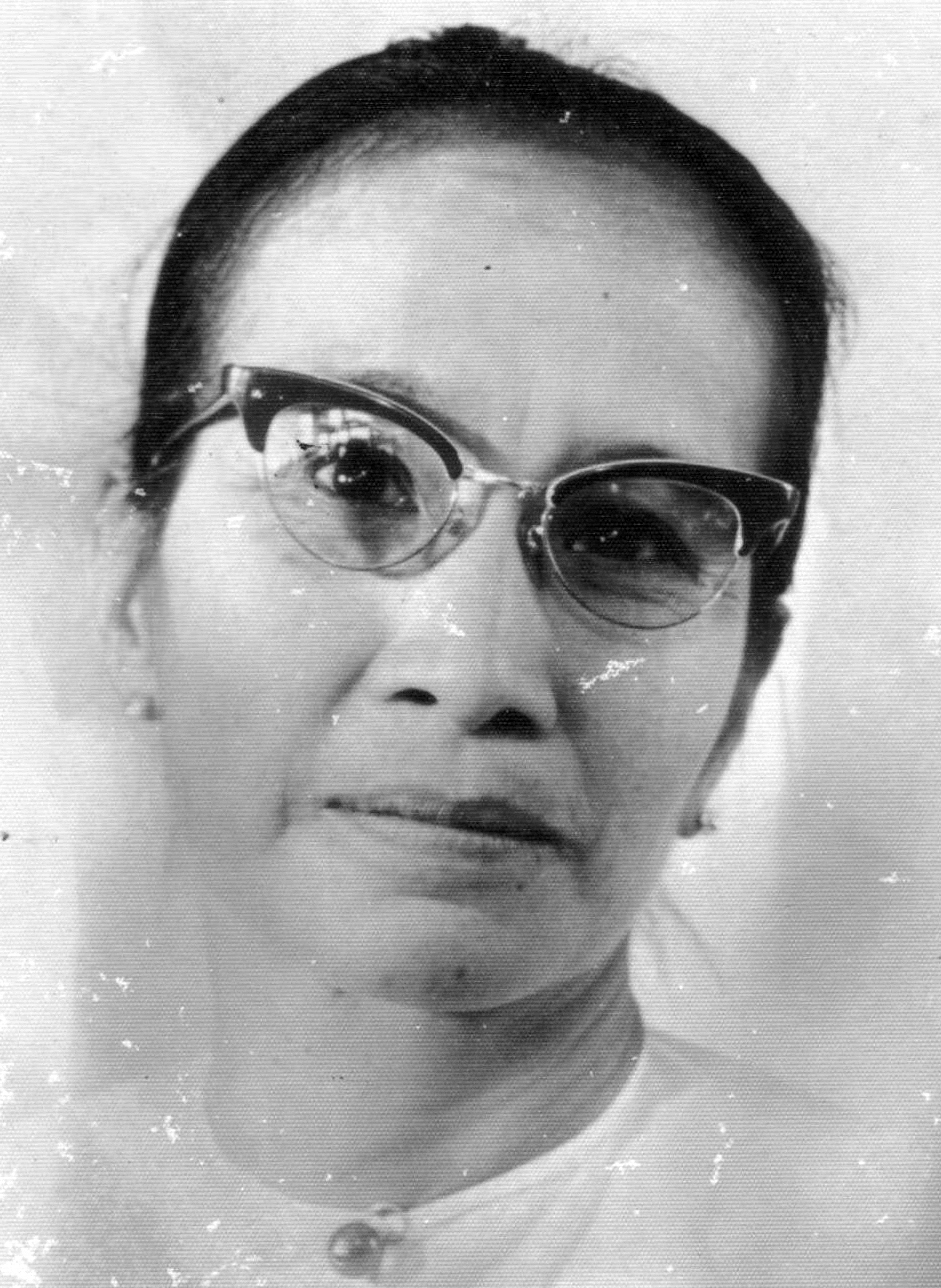
- Khin Myo Chit in 1961
- Born: Khin Mya; 1 May 1915; Sagaing, British Burma
- Died: 2 January 1999 (aged 83); Yangon, Myanmar
- Occupations: Author, editor
- Spouse: Khin Maung Lat
- Writing career
- Notable works: A Wonderland of Burmese Legends, Colourful Burma

Khin Myo Chit (Burmese: ခင်မျိုးချစ်, pronounced [kʰɪ̀ɰ̃ mjó tɕʰɪʔ]; 1 May 1915 – 2 January 1999) was a Burmese author and journalist, whose career spanned over four decades. She began her career writing short stories in Burmese for Dagon Magazine in 1934. She worked on the editorial staff of The Burma Journal during anti-colonial movements. After the war, Khin Myo Chit wrote for The Oway, a Burmese newspaper.

Her birth name was Khin Mya. She was given her pen name in 1932 or 1933 when she translated Walter Scott's "The Lay of the Last Minstrel" for a university magazine. She signed the translation "A Patriotic Lady" (in English), and her editor translated the attribution as "Khin Myo Chit".

== National activism ==
She started her work in Burmese culture, literature and politics in the 1300 Movement. She acted as deputy head of the Women's Front of the 1300 Movement which demanded self-rule at the Shwedagon Pagoda in Rangoon (now Yangon) on 29 January 1939. Starting from that moment, she adopted the name, Khin Myo Chit.

== Journalism ==
After the 1300 Movement, Khin Myo Chit started writing in many patriotic Burmese papers, including the Deedoke Journal.

She graduated from the University of Rangoon in 1952, and served as an editor for The Guardian Daily, when she began writing short stories and articles in English. Her story, "The 13-carat Diamond", which appeared first in The Guardian Daily, was featured in Fifty Great Oriental Stories, published by Bantam Classics. Other stories, including "Her Infinite Variety" and "The Four Puppets", won acclaim in Asia. During her career, Khin Myo Chit wrote many English publications, including a historical novel on King Anawrahta.

Khin Myo Chit also served as an editor in the Working People's Daily, voicing her political opinions and also her nationalistic spirit. She also wrote many books on Burmese culture – such as the Wonderland of Burmese Legends, where she documented famous myths, legends and folktales of Myanmar, and the Colourful Burma series.

== Death ==
Khin Myo Chit died on 2 January 1999 at her home in Yangon. Her son, Khin Maung Win and daughter-in-law Tekkatho Shwe Yi Win are Burmese writers.

== Literary career ==
- 1932 – "Patriotism" (a poem that earned her pen name)
- 1936 – College Girl (a novelette for serialization in The Sun a daily paper.)
- 1945 – Three Years Under the Japs
- 1955 – "13 Carat Diamond" (short story published in The Guardian magazine, later included in 50 Great Oriental Stories in Bantam Classics.)
- 1963 to 1968 – Heroes of Old Burma and Quest for Peace (an autobiography) (Both serialized in The Working People's Daily.)
- 1969 – 13 Carat Diamond and Other Stories
- 1970 – "Her Infinite Variety" (a prize-winning short in the Horizon magazine short story competition.). "The Four Puppets" (included in Folk Tales of Asia by UNESCO). Anawrahta of Burma(Myanmar) (Publication of Heroes of Old Burma (Myanmar), which was later re-printed under the titles 'Anawrahta' and 'King Among Men'.)
- 1976 – Colourful Burma (a practical and poetic guide for the visitor who wants something better than a tourist view of Myanmar, later reprinted under the title 'Colourful Myanmar'.
- 1977 – Burmese Scenes and Sketches
- 1980 – Flowers and Festivals Round the Burmese Year: Kyaikhtiyo (a short history of Kyaikhtiyo Pagoda, published in the Asia Magazine.)
- 1981 – "A Pagoda Where Fairy Tale Characters Come to Life" (a tale-like description of Melamu Pagoda in the outskirts of Yangon, published in the Asia Magazine.)
- 1984 – A Wonderland of Burmese Legends (published by the Tamarind Press in Bangkok later reprinted in Myanmar under the title A Wonderland of Pagoda Legends
- 1995 – Gift of Laughter (on the picturesque speech of the people of Hladaw, a village in Central Myanmar, selections of which have been published in the Pyinsa Rupa magazine.)
- 2005 – Stories and Sketches of Myanmar
