= Po Lat =

Po Lat (1900-???) is a scholar of Burmese literature. Among other works he is known for his historical study of Burmese orthography.

== Works ==
- Mranʻ mā ca kāʺ ʼa phvaṅʻʺ kyamʻʺ : Mranʻ mā ʼabhidhānʻ ṭīkā Ranʻ kunʻ : Paññānanda Puṃ nhipʻ Tuikʻ, 1962-1964.
