= Maung Khin Min (Danubyu) =

Burmese writer (1942–2025)

- မောင်ခင်မင် (ဓနုဖြူ)
- Born: 24 January 1940; Danubyu, Japanese-occupied Burma
- Died: 27 January 2025 (aged 85)
- Occupations: Writer, linguist

Maung Khin Min (Danubyu) (Burmese: မောင်ခင်မင် (ဓနုဖြူ; 2 January 1942 – 27 January 2025) [màʊɰ̃kʰɪ̀ɰ̃ mɪ́ɰ̃ dənṵbjù] was a Burmese writer. He died on 27 January 2025, at the age of 83.

== Works ==
Khin Min wrote the following books

- C¯a pe samuddar¯a n* lak` pac` k¯u´´ khran`´´ : c¯a pe sabho ta r¯a´´ naññ`´´ n¯a c¯a cu / Mon` Khan` Man` (Dhanu phr¯u).
- Mran` mā cakā´´ Mran` mācā rup` pumh lvhā
- Rhe` rathā´´ nok` rathā´´
- Trailing the Zartaka and Yarmayana about a collection of 16 short articles about the dramatic troupe of Buddha's life stories
- Cakā´´ pre sabho tarā´´ cakā´´ pro ´atak` paññā
- Mran` mā bhāsā cakā´´ paññā rhanH` myā´´ nhanH`´ bhāsā cakā´´ ´amranH`
- Cakā´´ Samuddarā, Cāsamuddarā about Burmese literature—History and criticism. A compilation of 37 articles by a professor of Myanmar Department, well-known writer for Myanmar literature. The articles are about the Myanmar words and phrases, their meanings and areas of usage, useful for those who want to study Myanmar literature
- Rhe` rathā´´ nok` rathā´´ about anecdotes on famous Burmese authors who have died. He won Lifelong national literary award for 2013.
