= Thein Pe Myint =

Burmese communist leader (1914–1978)

- သိန်းဖေမြင့်
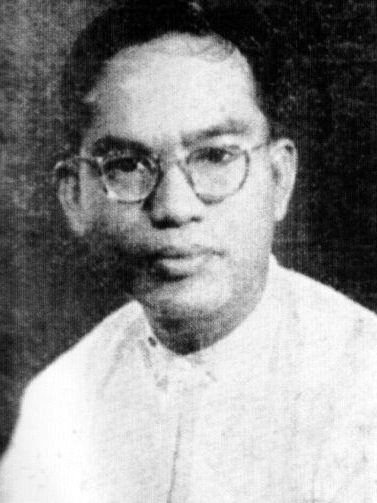
- Born: 10 July 1914; Butalin, British Burma
- Died: 15 January 1978 (aged 63); Rangoon, Burma
- Education: Rangoon University
- Occupations: Writer, Publisher, Journalist, Politician
- Spouse: Khin Kyi Kyi (1946–1978)
- Children: Han Tha Myint
- Writing career
- Pen name: Thakhin Thein Pe
- Notable works: Tet Phonegyi; Thabeik Hmauk Kyaungtha; Ashae-Ga Ne-Wun Htwet Thi Pa Mar

Thein Pe Myint (Burmese: သိန်းဖေမြင့် [θéɪɰ̃ pʰè mjɪ̰ɰ̃]; also Thakin Thein Pe (သခင် သိန်းဖေ [θəkʰɪ̀ɰ̃ θéɪɰ̃ pʰè]); 10 July 1914 – 15 January 1978) was a Burmese politician, writer, and journalist. He wrote several politically and socially prominent books and founded the influential newspaper, The Botataung. Thein Pe Myint was a leading Marxist intellectual and an important player in the Burmese independence movement and postwar politics.

== Brief personal history ==
Thein Pe Myint was born Thein Pe in Butalin, Sagaing Division in Upper Burma. He later added his mother's name, Daw Myint, when he started writing. He earned a BA degree from Rangoon University in 1935. Thein Pe Myint married Khin Kyi Kyi in 1946 and had four children. He died in 1978 at the age of 64.

== Political career ==
Thein Pe Myint became involved in politics as a Rangoon University student in mid-1930s. Known then by his birth name, Thein Pe, he became a secretary of Dobama Asiayone (We Burmans Association), an influential anti-colonial association whose members included the who's who of Burmese independence politics: Thakin Aung San, Thakin Nu, Thakin Kyaw Nyein, Thakin Mya, Thakin Than Tun, Thakin Shu Maung (later Ne Win), etc.

Already a well-known and controversial writer, Thakin Thein Pe quickly became one of the leading spokesmen of the leftist movement in Burma. He was an important student leader in the protests against the colonial British Government in 1936 and the "Uprising of 1300 ME" in 1938.

When the Second World War began Thein Pe Myint was one of a few leading Burmese independence activists that refused to ally with fascist Japan. In an open break with most other prominent student leaders like Aung San, Thein Pe Myint sided with the Allied powers, even if it meant working with the British. In 1942, Thein Pe Myint went underground when the Japanese empire conquered Burma.

Thein Pe Myint's position on Japan was later vindicated as Japanese rule proved disastrous. General Aung San, who had allied with the Japanese, sent Thein Pe Myint as an envoy to India to seek help from the Allies in fighting the Japanese. He played a leading role in the propaganda and liaison activities between wartime Burmese leaders, like General Aung San, and the British Force 136, the special operations and intelligence unit.

After the war, he worked in many associations and parties, including the Communist Party of Burma, Sino-Burmese Friends Associations, People Peace Association, and the Burmese Writers Association.

In 1946, he became the first minister of Agriculture and Forestry in General Aung San's government during the war. He was jailed in 1948 but released in 1949. After independence, Thein Pe Myint's political career turned to advocacy as a journalist.

== Career as a writer and journalist ==
Thein Pe Myint's literary career began in 1937 when he was already a politically active Rangoon University student. His inaugural work "Tet Phonegyi" (The Modern Monk; တက်ဘုန်းကြီး) openly deals with scandalous sexual liaisons and corrupt affairs of some of Burmese Buddhist clergy. His fellow Dobama Asiayone member Thakin Nu wrote the introduction of the book. The provocative book shocked the highly devout Burma, and came to symbolize the open challenge by the left-leaning college-educated student activists to the old unspoken norms of Burmese society. The book was vigorously denounced by Young Monks Association. Both the writer and the publishing company received many threats. However some leading writers including Zawgyi welcomed the book. He became known as Tet Pongyi Thein Pe.

His notable works include:

- Tet Pongyi (The Modern Monk; တက်ဘုန်းကြီး)
- Tet Khit Nat Soe (Devil in Modern Era; တက်ခေတ်နတ်ဆိုး)
- Thabeik Hmauk Kyaungtha (The Boycotting Student; သပိတ်မှောက်ကျောင်းသား)
- Thakin Kodaw Hmaing—Biography of Thakin Kodaw Hmaing
- Ashay Ga Ne-Wun Htwet Thi Ba Ma (As the Sun Rises from the East; အရှေ့က နေဝန်းထွက်သည့်ပမာ) - Winner of Burmese Literary Prize
- The History of Chin State - Winner of Burmese Literary Prize

He wrote several books in English including What Happened in Burma and Over the Ashes. Many of his works are still being republished to this day, and among them Wartime Traveller remains a bestseller. The book has been translated into English by Dr. Robert H. Taylor.

He also directed a movie Yaukkya Gonyi (A Man's Honour; ယောက်ျားဂုဏ်ရည်). He worked in the Red Dragon Book Association and wrote several plays.

Thein Pe Myint founded The Botataung newspaper in 1958. (He was a former news correspondent of Myanma Alin in the late 1930s.) He was the chief editor of the left leaning influential paper until 1964 when his newspaper was nationalized by the socialist government led by General Ne Win as part of his Burmese Way to Socialism.
