= Po Kya =

- ဖိုးကျား
- Born: 23 March 1891; Neibban village, Hinthada, Ayeyarwady Region, British Burma
- Died: 11 April 1942 (aged 51); Htantabin, Pegu Division, British Burma
- Occupations: novelist, Educational reformer, Superintendent
- Writing career
- Period: 1920–1942
- Genre: Short stories
- Notable work: Akha-Me Coolie Htan Chin (1937) Thibaw Min Pardawmu Ayedawbon

U Po Kya (Burmese: ဖိုးကျား, pronounced [pʰó tɕá]; also spelled Pho Kyar; 23 March 1891 – 11 April 1942) is considered one of the top Burmese authors and education reformists in 20th century Myanmar. He is regarded as the father of Burmese short stories, a key member of the Nationalist Education movement of the 1930s and also a literary genius. His works continue to be popular with both the young and old in Myanmar.

== Youth ==
Po Kya was born to Daw Daung and U Pe in Neibban Village, Hinthada district on the Irrawaddy delta in 1891. Educated at Lawka-dat Monastery in Neibban Village and Lay Htet Kyaung, Po Kya also served as a teaching assistant while pursuing his education in the monasteries. He passed the government college matriculation exam only at the age of 27 and then proceeded to Judson College (now part of Rangoon University) in Rangoon (Yangon).

== National Education ==
During the 1920 University Students' Strike, he served on the Students' Council and began writing articles for the New Light of Myanmar, then a Burmese nationalist newspaper. He received his B.A. in 1922 and began to work as an education Superintendent.

== Death ==
Po Kya died of malaria on 11 April 1942 while fleeing the Japanese invasion during the Second World War at Htantabin in today's Yangon Region.
