= Sarpay Beikman Manuscript Awards =

- Native name: စာပေဗိမာန် စာပဒေသာ ဆုများ
- Awarded for: Unpublished manuscripts in various fiction and non-fiction categories.
- Status: Annual

The Sarpay Beikman Manuscript Awards (Burmese: စာပေဗိမာန် စာပဒေသာ ဆုများ) are annual literary awards given in Burma by the Sarpay Beikman (Palace of Literature), a department of the Ministry of Information. They are awarded for unpublished manuscripts in various fiction and non-fiction categories. Sarpay Beikman publishes the winning entries, as well as giving a financial prize. The awards complement the Burma National Literature Award and the privately sponsored Sayawun Tin Shwe Award, Pakokku U Ohn Pe literary award, Thuta Swesone literary award and Tun Foundation award.

== Background ==
Khin Hnin Yu, winner for 1960

The Burmese Translation Society began to present the Sarpay Beikman Awards (K. 1000) in 1949. They were renamed the Literary Fine Art Awards in 1962 and the National Literary Awards in 1965.

The awards were presented to authors who submitted manuscripts in categories such novel, translation, general literature, general knowledge, short story, poems, and dramas. The prizes were awarded annually, and the manuscripts published. Entries had to comply with five general principles: the works must support or at least agree with the ruling party aims, foster Burmese culture, promote patriotism, help build character and advance ideas and contribute useful knowledge. A first, second and third prize was awarded in each category where there were suitable entries, which was not always the case.

From 1970 a new system was started. Unpublished works were submitted in competition for the Sarpay Beikman Manuscript Awards. However, the National Literary Awards, one per category, were selected from books that had been published in the previous year. Although 12 awards could be given, the selection committee usually chose fewer, since it is often not possible to find a publication that meets the guidelines, particularly in the "novel" category. In recent years the genres covered by Sarpay Beikman Manuscript and National Literary Awards have been gradually extended and the number of awards increased. Relatively few translators are honored. In 2008 no translation prize was given at all. This may in part be due to financial constraints, in part to censorship and interference in what is translated by the military regime.

== Awards by year ==
=== 1955 awards ===
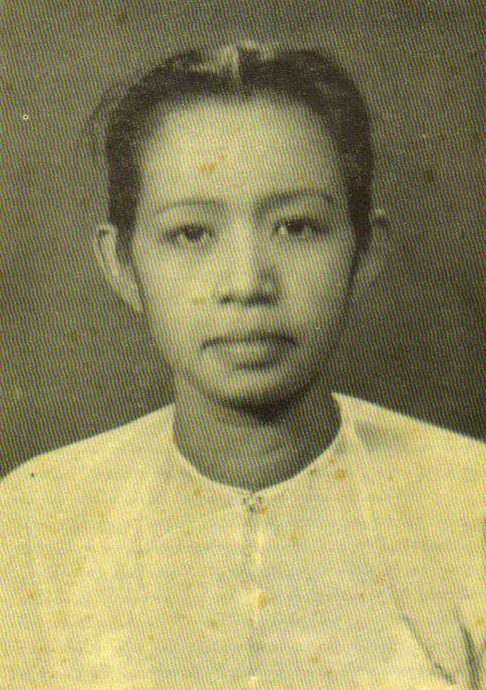
Journal Kyaw Ma Ma Lay

- Saya Zawgyi, Variety in literature category, for Thakin Kodaw Hmaing htika
- Journal Kyaw Ma Ma Lay, Mone Ywa Mahu (Not Out of Hate)

=== 1957 awards ===
- Ludu U Hla Htaung hnint lutha (ထောင်နှင့်လူသား) - Prison and Man

=== 1959 awards ===
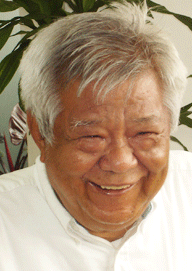
Tin Moe

- Tin Moe, Poetry: Hpan Mee Ain (The Lantern)

=== 1961 awards ===
- Khin Hnin Yu, Kyemon Yeik Thwin Wuttu-to Myar (ကြေးမုံရိပ်သွင် ဝတ္ထုတိုများ) Mirror Image-Like Short Stories

=== 1963 awards ===
- Sayawun Tin Shwe, General Knowledge (literature)
- Journal Kyaw Ma Ma Lay, Twe Ta Saint Saint (A Slow Stream of Thoughts and Burmese Medicine Tales)

=== 1964 awards ===
- Ludu Daw Amar, Literature on Burmese Culture and Arts: Pyithu chit thaw anupyinnya themya - Artistes that People Loved 1964

=== 1990 awards ===
The winner of the 1990 awards were announced on November 22, 1991: In some cases no prize was awarded (e.g. no first prize, but a second or third prize), The winners were:

Category	Winners
Novels	2nd prize: In-twe Pwe-lyet Ashar-hwet by Pho Kyawt Kho; 3rd: Than-yaw-zin-hsu by Ma Aye Nyein
Short Stories	2nd: Kyaung-gin Tha-moddayar hnint Maha Myintmo by Maung Yint Mar (Kyaunggon); 3rd: Tingyi Ta-wan Byaing Ta-wan by Nyo Nyo Yin (Daik-U)
Belles Letters [sic]	2nd: Madu Thadda Shwedaung Kyawswa Bweya Yokthay Minthameegyi U Phu Nyo ei Bawa Zatkyaung by Shezaung Tin Swe
Translation	1st: The three short stories of W. Somerset Maugham, trans. by U Ba Than (AB).
Children's literature	1st: Waihinsan Meikswemyar by Aung Naing (Tekkatho). 2nd: Ayemyathaw Ayeik by Aung Thuyein (Pale). 3rd: Mwe-may thee-char Yadana hnint Achar Wutthu-domyar by Maung Tha Hmwe
Youth literature	1st: Lu-nge Lan-hnyun by Dr. Kyaw Sein; 2nd: Ywetthit Thabye hnint Achar Lu-nge Wutthudomyar by Min Chan Mon; 3rd: Yemon Yadana by Maung Hsanda (Lewe).
Myanmar culture and fine arts	1st: Alinga Kyaw-swa U San Kho ei Zar-timan Lingarmyar hnint Mintharthon Zathtoksarmyar by Soe Wai; 2nd: Myanma Sinyok-cho Anupyinnyar by Maung Yee Soe (Kyaukse); 3rd: Myanma Oh by Htan Hlaing
General knowledge (arts)	2nd: Myanma Ein-thu Myanma-mu by U Aye Cho (MA).
General knowledge (science and applied science)	2nd: Myanma Yadana Kyun-shwewar by San Win (Mann). 3rd: Nay-ein-ta-lon-daw Hpyit-aung Hsauk-mai by Chan Aye Maung
Plays	no awards made.
Political literature	no awards made.

=== 2000 awards ===
Winners of the 2000 awards were announced on 25 November 2001. They were:

Genre	Winners
Novels	2nd: Myo Win Chit for Sabe-cherry-thet-the-ti-ywae
Collected short stories	1st: Nay Myo Thant for Tharafi-kyaing-hlaing-thin-pa-de-win-mya-ye-mye; 2nd: Maung Sanda (Lewe) for Ame-yin-ngwe-hnin-achar wut-htu-to-myar 3rd: Twin Gyi Win Maung for Nga-taw-nga-lone
Collected poems	1st: Salin Phone Kyaw for Mitta-yeik-nan-pan-yaung-zone-kabya-myar; 2nd: Yenatha Maung Kyaw Nyunt for Yin-de-ka-thitsa-hnin-achar-kabya-myar
General knowledge (arts)	1st: Dr Maung Maung Soe for Ze-gwet-see-pwa-yay-hnin-naing-gan-win-ngwe; 2nd: Tkkatho Ko Maung for Dagon Saya Tin-e-bawa-hnin-anu-pinnya
General knowledge (science and applied science),	1st: Dr Tin Thein (Pathein University) for Lutha-asa-Myanma-ka; 2nd: Tun Aung Kyaw for Myanmar-naing-gan-mye-athone-cha-hmu-hnin-hnase-tarazu; 3rd: Tint Lwin Swe for Nga-lyin-hnin-ngalyin-bay-andaye-chaw-cha-ye
sar-padetha	1st: Maung Moe Yan for chin-dwin-myit-e-tha-maing-ta-chet-pe-tin-than 2nd" Thet Lwin for Bagan-anauk-kha-ye-takhauk; 3rd>Maung Chit (MA) for See-thwin-nyo-yit-meza-myit
Myanmar Culture and Art	1st: Htan Hlaing for She-haung-Myanma-oo-myo-daw; 2nd: Ko Ko (research) for Yadanapon-Mandalay-namyo-pya-thet-hnin-asin-ala
Children's literature	1st: Maung Tha Hmwe for Pyu-pyu-hmwe-hmwe-pan-kalay-hnin-achar Short Stories; 2nd>Hsu Latt Tun for Nyit Moe-hnin-achar-sarsu-mya; 3rd: Dr Ko Ko Kyaing for Kalay-mya-atwet-swe-sone-kyan
Youth literature	1st: Maung Khaing Khant for Pan-do-e-dai-ya-yi.
Translation,	1st: Dr Nyunt Shwe Dai-no-saw-athi-nyan
Plays	No winner
Politics	No winner

=== 2003 awards ===
The 2003 award presentation ceremony was held at the National Theatre on Myoma Kyaung Street in Yangon on 12 December 2004. Secretary-1 of the State Peace and Development Council Lt-Gen Thein Sein opened his address by saying "at a time when the State is doing all it can to build up a peaceful, modern and developed nation, it is also striving not only for physical infrastructural development of the country but also for enhancement of national literature for mental development of the people". Secretary-1 presented the Life-long National Literary Award to writer U Htay Maung. Sarpay Beikman Manuscript Awards given for works submitted in 2003 were:

Category	Presenter	Author
Novel	Commander Maj-Gen Myint Swe	Aung Lin Lat (Okkala)
Selected short story	Commander Maj-Gen Myint Swe	Myaylat Min Lwin
Selected poem	Minister for Information Brig-Gen Kyaw Hsan	Kyaw Zaw Lin
General knowledge (arts)	Minister for Information Brig-Gen Kyaw Hsan	Reporter Thaung Nyunt (Pyapon)
General knowledge (science and applied science)	Minister for Social Welfare, Relief and Resettlement Maj-Gen Sein Htwa	Maung Maung Myint Thein
Belles-letters	Minister for Social Welfare, Relief and Resettlement Maj-Gen Sein Htwa	Myoma Myint Kywe
Myanma culture and arts literature	Minister for Home Affairs Maj-Gen Maung Oo	Shin Htwe Mei (Manoktha)
Child literature	Minister for Home Affairs Maj-Gen Maung Oo	Theikpan Soe Myint Naing
Youth literature	Minister for Home Affairs Maj-Gen Maung Oo	Aung Than Oo (2nd prize)

=== 2005 awards ===
Awards for 2005 were presented at a ceremony at Nay Pyi Taw city hall on 30 January 2007. Secretary-1 of the State Peace and Development Council Lt-Gen Thein Sein addressed the attendees. The Secretary-1 gave the Lifetime Achievement National Literary Award for 2005 to Daw Yin Yin (Saw Monnyin) and presented nine other National Literary prizes in different categories. Winners of the Sarpay Beikman Manuscript awards were:

Category	Presenter	Author
Novel	Commander Brig-Gen Wai Lwin	Thein Zaw (Shweli Oo) (third prize)
Collected short stories	Commander Brig-Gen Wai Lwin	Myaylat Min Lwin
Collected poems	Minister Brig-Gen Kyaw Hsan	Maung Pyae Hlaing (Thandwe)
General knowledge (arts)	Minister Maj-Gen Saw Lwin	Tin Tun Oo (Culture)
General knowledge (Science and Applied Science)	Minister Maj-Gen Tin Htut	Naing Shwe Moe
Belles-letters	Chief Justice U Aung Toe	Tin Myint
Culture and fine arts literature	Attorney-General U Aye Maung	Aung Nyein Chan
Child literature	Minister Brig-Gen Ohn Myint	Nay Soe Thaw
Play	Minister Brig-Gen Ohn Myint	Zin Min (Thameinhtaw)
Translation	Minister Brig-Gen Ohn Myint	Nyunt Shwe

No manuscript won an award the political literary genre.

=== 2007 awards ===
The 2007 awards were given out at a ceremony on 28 December 2008 at the Ministry of Information in Nay Pyi Taw. Later the Minister for Information Brig-Gen Kyaw Hsan hosted a dinner in honor of the life-time achievement literary award and Sarpay Beikman manuscript award winners for 2007 at the Shwenantaw Hotel of Nay Pyi Taw. Minister for Labour U Aung Kyi attended the dinner. First prize winners were:

Category	Presenter	Author
Novel	Minister for Industry-2 Vice-Admiral Soe Thein	Thu Theim
Collective short stories	Minister for Industry-2 Vice-Admiral Soe Thein	Thwe Htar Nyo (Thakkala)
Collective poems	Minister for Culture Maj-Gen Khin Aung Myint	Aye Kyi Sein
General knowledge (arts)	Minister for Culture Maj-Gen Khin Aung Myint	Htin Lin Kyaw
General knowledge (science and applied science)	Minister for Labour U Aung Kyi	Aung Soe (Agriculture-107)
Belles letter	Minister for Labour U Aung Kyi	Aung Soe
Myanmar culture and fine arts	Chief Justice U Aung Toe	Ma Aye Chan (Myanmarsar)
Child literature	Chief Justice U Aung Toe	Lu Mon (Pakokku)
Youth literature	Deputy Minister for Social Welfare, Relief and Resettlement Brig-Gen Kyaw Myint	Maung Kyi Thant
Translation	Brig-Gen Kyaw Myint	U Aung Soe Oo
Drama literature	Brig-Gen Kyaw Myint	Zin Min (Thameinhtaw) (2nd prize)

=== 2008 awards ===
The 2008 awards were presented at a ceremony at the Ministry of Information on 31 December 2009. Secretary-1 of the State Peace and Development Council General Thiha Thura Tin Aung Myint Oo addressed the attendees. He presented the Life-Time Achievement National Literary Award to doyen literati Sayagyi Dr Kyaw Sein. First prize winners of Sarpay Beikman Manuscript Awards were:

Category	Presenter	Author	Work
Novel	Minister for Agriculture and Irrigation Maj-Gen Htay Oo	Nay Myo Thant	
Collected short stories	Minister for Foreign Affairs U Nyan Win	Myelat Min Lwin	
Collected poems	Minister for Mines Brig-Gen Ohn Myint	Maung Han Tint (Pinlebu)	
General knowledge (arts)	Minister for Home Affairs Maj-Gen Maung Oo	Than Tun (Mawlamyine)	
General knowledge (science and applied science)	Minister for Sports Brig-Gen Thura Aye Myint	Lu Lay (Delta)	
Belle-letters	Minister for Health Dr Kyaw Myint	Thaung Nyunt Thit	
Myanmar culture and fine arts literature	Minister for Education Dr Chan Nyein	Ma Aye Chan (Myanmarsar)	
Child literature	Minister for Culture Maj-Gen Khin Aung Myint	Min Naing Lay (Lanmadaw)	
Youth literature	Chief Justice U Aung Toe	Khin La Pyae Wun	
Drama literature	Attorney-General U Aye Maung	Zin Min (Thameinhtaw)	

=== 2009 awards ===
The 2009 Life-time Achievement for National Literary Award, National Literary Award and Sarpay Beikman Manuscript Award presentation ceremony was held in the hall of the Ministry of Information on 31 December 2010. The attendees heard an address by Secretary-1 of the State Peace and Development Council Thiha Thura U Tin Aung Myint Oo. Winners of Sarpay Beikman Manuscript Awards for 2009 included:

Category	Presenter	Winners
Novel	Minister for Information U Kyaw Hsan	Thu Thein; Ko Yaw (Economics); Thein Zaw (ShweliOo).
Selected Short Stories	Minister for Foreign Affairs U Nyan Win	Maung Cheint; Myay Latt Min Lwin; Khin La Pyae Win
Selected poems	Minister for Foreign Affairs U Nyan Win	Zaw Myo Han (Ngathainggyoung); Maung Han Tint (Pinlebu); Hlaing Htay Aung (Shwetada).
General knowledge (arts)	Minister for Mines U Ohn Myint	Maung Yin Hlaing (Pyinmamyaing); Dr Cho Cho Tint (Myanmarsar); Shwe Hintha (University of Mandalay)
General knowledge (science and applied science)	Minister for Mines U Ohn Myin	Thaung Nyunt Thit; Aung Soe (Agriculture/107); Pho Swe (Timber Enterprise).
Belle-letter	Minister for Sports Thura U Aye Myint	(2nd) Nay Myo Nwe
Myanma Culture and Fine Arts	Minister for Sports Thura U Aye Myint	Myat Wai Toe (University of Education); U Thaung Tun; Htoo Htoo Win.
Child literature	Minister for Religious Affairs Thura U Myint Maung	Kanbalu Khin Maung Swe; Khin Maung Myint (Shwe Hse Myay); Ma Swe Than
Youth literature	Minister for Labour U Aung Kyi	Nay Myo Thant; Thwe Htar Nyo (Thetkala); Wutyee Khin (Bago).
Drama	Chairman of Civil Service Selection and Training Board; U Kyaw Thu	Nyein Min; Maung Sanda (Lewe); Tin Htun Oo (Culture).
Political literature	Deputy Minister for Social Welfare and Relief and Resettlement; U Kyaw Myint	(2nd) Myint Soe (Na-Ta- La)
Translation	Deputy Minister for Social Welfare and Relief and Resettlement; U Kyaw Myint	Dr Nyunt Shwe (Taunggyi)

=== 2012 awards ===
The 2012 Life-time Achievement for National Literary Award, National Literary Award and Sarpay Beikman Manuscript Award presentation ceremony was held at the National Theatre, Yangon on 3 December 2013. Winners of Sarpay Beikman Manuscript Awards for 2012 were:

Category	Winners
Novel	Soe Myint Maung (Tharawaw); Thwet Htar Nyo; Thu Thein
Selected Short Stories	Maung Nay Chi (Pyay); Thaung Myint Oo (Kunchankone); Lieutenant Lwin Bo Bo Aung
Selected poems	Khin Phone Kyi (Mongpun); Kaung Nyunt Wai (Yezagyo); Myat Phone (Tatkon)
General knowledge (arts)	U Tun Lwin (Meiktila); Maung Nwe Than
General knowledge	Aung Soe (Agriculture-107); Thaung Nyunt Thit
Belle-letter	Dr Maung Maung; Min Shin Aung (Twantay); Maung Yin Hlaing (Pyinma Myaing)
Myanma Culture and Fine Arts	Myat Wai Toe (Institute of Education); Hlaing Win Swe; U Ye Dwe (Amyint Thabin).
Child literature	Zaw Myo Han (Ngathaingchaung); Shwe Yin Hnit; Kantbalu KhinMaung Swe
Youth literature	Kyunsinmyay Saw Khet
Drama	Zin Min (Thamein Htaw); Maung Soe Htaik (Thonze)
Translation	Tin Aung Chit

=== 2013 awards ===
The 2013 Life-time Achievement for National Literary Award, National Literary Award and Sarpay Beikman Manuscript Award presentation ceremony was held at the National Theatre, Yangon on 22 November 2014. Winners of Sarpay Beikman Manuscript Awards for 2013 were:

Category	Winners
Novel	Khin Lei Lei Chit (Myan/Gon) Soe Myint Maung (Tharawaw) Lieutenant Lwin Bo Bo Aung
Selected Short Stories	Thuti Awba (Hsinbaungwe) Kan Myint Maw; Saw Khet
Selected poems	Zaw Myo Han Maung Kyi Nwe Min Thway Nge (Zigon)
General knowledge (arts)	Yin Yin Maung (Archaeology) Ko Yaw (Economics); Khin Hnin Yi (YU)
General knowledge (science and applied science)	Dr Maung Phyay science writer Ko Ko Aung
Belle-letter	Min Shin Aung (Twantay) Maung Yin Hlaing (Pyinmamyaing)
Myanma Culture and Fine Arts	Dr Tint Lwin Myat Wai Toe (University of Education)
Child literature	Kanbalu Khin Maung Swe Yutyikhin (Bago) Zaw Myo Han (Ngathainggyoung)
Youth literature	Myint Soe (Na Ta La)
English	U Ye Dway
Translation	Tin Maung Than (Ywama)
