= Htun =

Htun is a word used in Burmese names. The people of Myanmar have no customary matronymic or patronymic naming system and therefore have no surnames. Notable people with Htun in their name include:

- Htun Htun Min (born 1992), Burmese Lethwei fighter
- Htun Aung (born 1967), Burmese military officer
- Maw Htun Aung (born 1984), Burmese politician, social activist and technologist
- Tet Htun Aung (born 1956), Burmese politician and MP
- Htun Eaindra Bo (born 1966), three-time Myanmar Academy Award-winning actress and singer
- Aik Htun, Burmese businessman, managing director of the Asia Wealth Bank
- Htet Htet Htun (born 1992), Burmese actress, TV Host, model and beauty pageant titleholder
- Htun Htun (born 1983), Burmese actor and singer
- Kyi Soe Htun (born 1945), award-winning film director, producer and screenwriter of Burmese cinema
- Mala Htun (1969–2025), American political scientist, professor of political science at the University of New Mexico
- Naing Zayar Htun (born 1985), footballer from Burma
- Nan Sandar Hla Htun (born 1993), Burmese actress, model and former beauty queen
- Sai Sam Htun (born 1946), Burmese businessman and founder of Loi Hein Company
- Sao San Htun (1907–1947), the hereditary chief of the Shan State of Mongpawn
- Si Phyo Htun (born 1990), Burmese actor
- Thein Htun (born 1947), retired Burmese Major-general and politician
- U Chan Htun (1906–1988), Attorney General and Associate Justice of the Supreme Court of Burma
- Wynn Zaw Htun (born 1982), Burmese chess International Master
- Zaw Win Htun (born 1992), Burmese singer of ethnic Rakhine descent
- Htun Lwin (1948–2019), Burmese meteorologist
- Ye Htun Min (born 1984), Burmese hip hop singer-songwriter, musician, actor and model
- Htun Myint Naing, aka Steven Law, Burmese businessman
- Htun Htun Oo (politician) (born 1961), Burmese politician and MP
- Htun Htun Oo (attorney-general), the Attorney General of Myanmar (Burma)
- Htun Htun Oo (chief justice) (born 1956), the Chief Justice of the Supreme Court of Myanmar (Burma)
- Khun Htun Oo (1943–2022), chairman of Shan Nationalities League for Democracy (SNLD)
- Htun Naung Sint (born 1997), Burmese singer and actor
- Yupar Htun Tin (born 1993), Burmese model, make-up artist, and beauty influencer
- Htun Wai (1920–2005), three-time Myanmar Academy Award-winning Burmese actor

== See also ==
- Htoo
- Naing
- Htan
