= Thuta Swesone literary award =

The Thuta Swesone literary awards have been presented by the Swesone Media group since 2006. They are sponsored by Tin Tun Oo, the cofounder of the Myanmar Times. The awards complement the government's National Literary Awards and Sarpay Beikman Manuscript Awards and the Sayawun Tin Shwe Award, Pakokku U Ohn Pe literary award and Tun Foundation award.

== Awards by year ==
=== 2007 awards ===
The fourth awards, for the year 2007, were announced in February 2009. A panel of eight judges from Swesone Media Group and from the Myanmar Writers and Journalists Association chose the winners. The 79-year-old writer and historian Khin Maung Nyunt won the lifetime achievement prize. Maung Tun Lwin (Meteorology) won the Science knowledge prize for The Girl Called La Niña and Articles about Natural Disasters. Other awards for books published in 2007 were won by Maung Zayyar, Hmu Thamein, Kyaw Oo Hla, Chit Swe Myint, Maung Hla Thaung, Chit Naing (Psychology), H E U Hla Maung (Eco) and Aung (MC1).

=== 2008 awards ===
The awards for the year 2008 were presented on 1 March 2010 at Traders Hotel in Yangon. Minister for Information Brigadier-General Kyaw Hsan attended the prize presentation ceremony. Winners were:

Category	Winner
Lifetime Achievement	U Chit San (Chit San Win)
Socio-economic)	Dr Chit
Arts	Tekkatho Sein Tin
Foreign Affairs	Ye Htut
Translation	Kyi Min
Youth Literature	Tin Soe
Reference Literature	Kyaw Win
Belles-lettres)	Ko Ko (Sethmu Tekkatho)
Applied Science)	Soe Lwin

=== 2009 awards ===
The sixth Thuta Swesone Literary Award, for Burmese books published in 2009, were announced on 20 April 2011. Winners were:

Category	Winner	Work
Lifetime Achievement Literary Award	Min Yu Wai aka Win Maung	
Arts	Maung Moe Thu	Profiles of Prominent Deceased Writers and Artists
Reference	Pe Myint	Book World
Social economics	Win Htut Zaw	Petroleum
Belles-lettres	Maung Khin Min	A Life of a Visiting Professor in Osaka
Science	Ko Swe won	
Translation	Kyi Shoon	Business Success
Youth literature	No winner	
International affairs	No winner	
Applied science	No winner	
