= Ohn =

Ohn is a Burmese name, used by people from Myanmar. Notable people with the name include:

- Daw Ohn (1913–2003), Burmese professor in Pali
- Ohn Gyaw (born 1932), Burmese Minister of Foreign Affairs from 1991 to 1998
- Ohn Kyaing (born 1944), Burmese politician and former political prisoner
- Ohn Kyaw Myint (born 1977), Burmese army officer
- Ohn Maung (1913–1947), Burmese Deputy Minister of Transport from 1946 to 1947
- Ohn Myint (1918–2010), Burmese journalist
- Ohn Myint (politician) (fl. 2010–2016), Burmese Minister for Livestock, Fisheries and Rural Development from 2011 to 2016
- Ohn Pe (c. 1917–2008), Burmese businessman
- Ohn Than (born 1946), Burmese democracy activist
- Maung Maung Ohn (fl. 2014–2016), Burmese Chief Minister of Rakhine State, Myanmar from 2014 to 2016
- Shwe Ohn (1923–2010), Burmese politician

== See also ==
- John (disambiguation)
- Ohm (disambiguation)
