= Ministry of Cooperatives and Rural Development =

Government ministry of Myanmar

- သမဝါယမနှင့် ကျေးလက်ဖွံ့ဖြိုးရေး ဝန်ကြီးဌာန
- seal of MCRD

Agency overview
- Formed: 17 June 2021; 5 years ago
- Type: Ministry
- Jurisdiction: Government of Myanmar
- Headquarters: Naypyidaw
- Minister responsible: Hla Moe, Union Minister
- Deputy Minister responsible: Myint Soe
- Website: mcrd.gov.mm

Ministry of Cooperatives and Rural Development (Burmese: သမဝါယမနှင့် ကျေးလက်ဖွံ့ဖြိုးရေး ဝန်ကြီးဌာန) is a ministry of Myanmar formed in 2021. The current union minister is Hla Moe, appointed by Min Aung Hlaing.

== History ==
In Myanmar, the Ministry of Cooperatives and Commodity Distribution was established in 1951.Then, Ministry of Support and Cooperatives and Ministry of Cooperatives were reorganized. In 2016, three independent ministries – Ministry of Cooperatives, Ministry of Livestock, Fisheries and Rural Development, Ministry of Agriculture and Irrigation – were reconstituted as the combined Ministry of Agriculture, Livestock and Irrigation. In the military government formed after the 2021 coup in Myanmar, the former Ministry of Cooperatives and the Department of Rural Development were reorganized as the Ministry of Cooperatives and Rural Development.

== Ministers ==
- Hla Moe (24 June 2021 - Incumbent)

=== Deputy Ministers ===
- Myint Soe (4 April 2022 - Incumbent)

== Departments ==
- Department of Cooperatives
  - University of Co-operative and Management, Thanlyin
  - University of Co-operative and Management, Sagaing
- Department of Rural Development ( https://www.drdmyanmar.org )
- Department of Small-Scale Industries
  - Lacquerware Technology college (Bagan)
  - Saunders Weaving and Vocational Institute (Amarapura)
  - (8) Weaving and Vocational High Schools
  - (5) Basic weaving schools
