= Naing =

Naing is a word used in Burmese names. The people of Myanmar have no customary matronymic or patronymic naming system and therefore have no surnames.

Notable people with Naing in their name include:

- Aung Kyaw Naing (1965–2014), freelance journalist in Myanmar
- Aung Kyaw Naing (born 1994), Burmese footballer
- Htun Myint Naing (born 1958), Burmese businessman
- Kaung Sett Naing (born 1993), Burmese footballer
- Kyaw Kyaw Naing (born 1964) Burmese traditional musician
- Mai Aih Naing (born 1990), Burmese footballer
- Min Ko Naing (born 1962), Burmese democracy activists
- Myint Naing (artist) (born 1967), Myanmar watercolor artist
- Myint Naing (professor) (born 1942), Burmese Dental Professor
- Myint Naing, Burmese politician and political prisoner
- Naing Lin Oo (born 1986), Burmese footballer
- Naing Win Swe (1940–1995), Burmese writer and poet
- San Naing (born 1991), Burmese long-distance runner
- Sann Satt Naing (born 1997), Burmese footballer
- Soe Min Naing (born 1990), Burmese footballer
- Tekkatho Phone Naing (1930–2002), Burmese writer
- Theikpan Soe Myint Naing, Burmese poet
- Thet Naing (born 1992), Burmese footballer
- Thet Naing Win, Burmese Lieutenant General in the Myanmar Army
- Tin Naing Thein, Minister of the President's Office of Myanmar
- Tin Tun Naing, Burmese acting union minister
- Toe Naing Mann (born 1978), Burmese businessman
- Twan Mrat Naing, Burmese chief of the Arakan Army
- Win Naing Soe (born 1993), Burmese footballer
- Yan Naing Oo (born 1996), Burmese footballer
- Yan Naing Soe (born 1979), Burmese judoka

== See also ==
- Htan
- Htoo
- Htun
