= Pakokku U Ohn Pe literary award =

The Pakokku U Ohn Pe literary award (Burmese: ပခုက္ကူ ဦးအုန်းဖေ စာပေဆု) is a literary award for Burmese writers that was established in 1992 by the businessman Pakokku U Ohn Pe, who initially provided K7.6 million to be used for prizes. The awards complement the government's National Literary Awards and Sarpay Beikman Manuscript Awards and the Sayawun Tin Shwe Award, Thuta Swesone literary award and Tun Foundation award.

== Awards by year ==
=== 2006 awards ===
The winners of the 2006 awards were announced on 26 February 2007. They were:

Genre	Winners
Collected poem	1st: Ngwe-kye-yanhka Ahla-thit-min Shwe-lamin hnint Acha-kabya-myar of Maung Soe Myat (ChaungU); 2nd:Ahyon-thit-myu Phu-pwint-way-si Pan-shwe-pyi Kabya-myar of Myaylatt Min Lwin; 3rd: Pwint-pan-theingi Kabya-myar of Zarni
Novel	2nd: Shwe-the-ta-pwint of Thein Zaw (ShweliU); 3rd: Thazin-le-thin Lamin-le-tha of Thein Than Win (Mahlaing)
Collected short stories	1st: Yin-hte-ka-mee hnint Acha-wutthuto-myar of Thwe Htar Nyo (Thakkala); 2nd: Hmaw Wutthuto-myar of Pathein Aung Than Oo; 3rd: Law-ka-ahla Bawa-kye-mon Wutthuto-myar of Nay Myo Thant
Treatise	1st: Myan-ma-yoe-ya Pan-ta-mawt of Maung Yin Hlaing (Pyinmamyaing); 2nd: Ache-khan Kyan-kyeik-wa-chin-saiya Ni-pyin-nya Yat-myar (techniques on crusting of sugarcane) of Maung Tin Phu
Literature for knowledge	1st: Taw-win-khant-hte Myanma-po-hte of Dr Kyaw Than Tun; 2nd: Thute-thana-kha-ye-thwa Pinya-inwa hmattan-myar of Aung Nyein Chan (Man Tekkatho)

=== 2008 awards ===
The awards for 2008 were presented in Yangon on 30 March 2009. The ceremony was attended by Minister for Information Brigadier-General Kyaw Hsan. Prizes were:

Presenter	Genre	Prize
Minister Brig-Gen Kyaw Hsan	Life-Long Literary Award	Dr Kyaw Sein
Minister Brig-Gen Kyaw Hsan	Collected poems	1st: Aung Tha Hsan (Thandwe) for Tay-thi-hnget-ei-pan-paung-taya-ka-byazu; 2nd: Maung Saw Tun (Kyaunggon) for Amay-ywa-hnit-achar-ka-byar-myar; 3rd: Aphyaukmyay Maung Swe Mon for Yay-chan-takhwet-pan-ta-khet
Minister Brig-Gen Kyaw Hsan	Novel	2nd: Min Zeya for Nge-thawhla-thi; 3rd: Paing (Hlaingthit) for Plastic-hte-gakyai-ta-bwint
Director-General U Khin Maung Htay of Myanma Radio and Television	Short stories	1st: Maung Cheint for Ta-nga-a-the-mar-ye-thalar-hey; 2nd: Nanda Khin (Thakkalamye) for Bo-bwaramway-chit-tat-say-hnit-achar-wut-htu-to-myar; 3rd:Nay Myo Thant for Myay-thin-pyant-pyant-moe-yanant-wut-htu-to-myar
Director-General U Khin Maung Htay of Myanma Radio and Television	Treatise	2nd: Zin Min (Thameinhtaw) for Phyatthan-khe-ya-tha-maing-zin-hsaung-kyin-kher-ya-tarwon-myar; 3rd: Kay Myu for Myanma-yoke-shin-nkhet-oo-dar-rite-tar-hse-nga-oo-doe-ei-yoke-ponhlwa-myar
Chairman U Hla Myaing (Ko Hsaung) of Myanmar Writers and Journalists Association	Pakokku Library Book Award	Nay Zin Lat, Kyaw Kyaw Win (MA) and Hmawwun Kyi Myat
