= Htun Htun Oo =

Htun Htun Oo; also spelled Tun Tun Oo is a Burmese name and may refer to:

- Htun Htun Oo (attorney-general)
- Htun Htun Oo (chief justice)
- Htun Htun Oo (politician) born 1961
