= Khin Maung Nyunt =

Burmese writer and historian (born 1929)

Sithu Dr. Khin Maung Nyunt
- ခင်မောင်ညွန့်
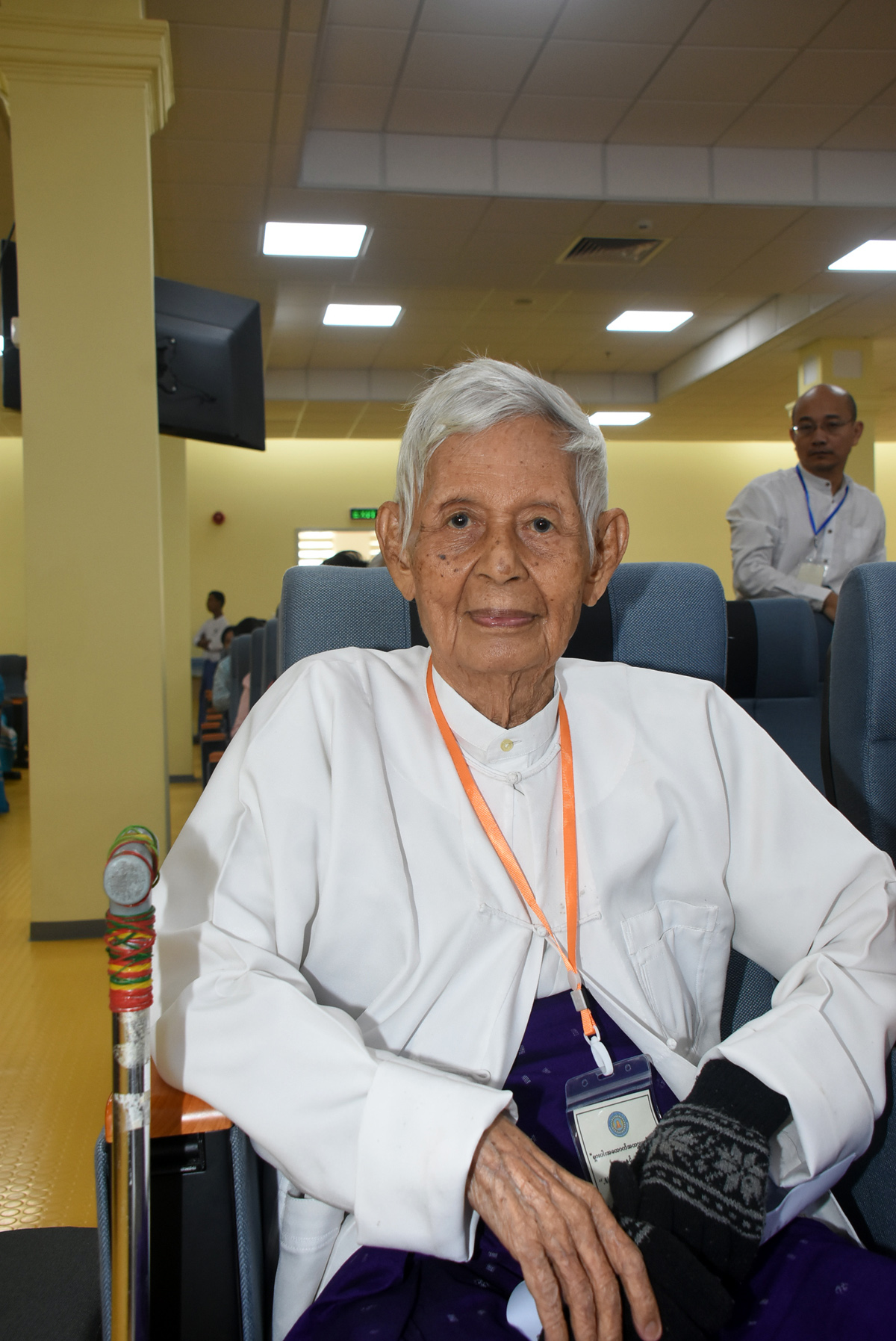
- Born: Hla Kyaing; 13 May 1929 (age 97); Mandalay, British Burma
- Education: Mandalay College; Rangoon University; London School of Economics
- Occupations: Writer; historian
- Awards: Sithu title (2012); Thuta-Swesone Literary Awards, National Literary Award

Khin Maung Nyunt (Burmese: ခင်မောင်ညွန့်; born 13 May 1929) is a Burmese writer and historian.

== Birth and education ==
Khin Maung Nyunt was born in Mandalay on May 13, 1929. He joined Mandalay College in 1948, and graduated with a B.A. degree in 1952.

He obtained the position of Tutor at Yangon University in the Department of Modern History and Political Science and by 1954 obtained a B.A. from Yangon University which was followed by an M.A. a year later.

In 1956 he won a scholarship from the Myanmar government to pursue postgraduate studies overseas at the London School of Economics, where he obtained a Doctorate in International Relations in 1960.

== Career ==
From 1961 to 1975 Khin Maung Nyunt was senior lecturer and departmental head in Mawlamyine College.

In 1976 he was transferred to the Ministry of Culture and was appointed director-general of both the Fine and Performing Arts Department and the Myanmar Historical Research Department.

In 1982 he was appointed professor of history and of international relations at Mandalay University.

In 1987 he was appointed director-general of the Department of Archaeology.

Recent positions include membership of the Myanmar Historical Commission, council of University of Culture and Central Executive Committee of the Myanmar Writers and Journalists Association. He was appointed professor of history and Buddhist art at the International Buddhist Missionary University.

He has broadcast on the English programme of Radio Myanmar, giving weekly talks on aspects of Myanmar culture.

He is the chief editor of the quarterly current affairs journal Myanmar perspectives.

== Achievements ==
Khin Maung Nyunt has written books, stories and articles in the Burmese and English languages.

He has spoken at international conferences on subjects such as history, education, Buddhism, culture, literature, art and archaeology.

In February 2009, he won the lifetime achievement prize at the fourth Thuta-Swesone Literary Awards.

On 31 December 2010 he was presented with the Lifetime Achievement National Literary Award.

== Partial bibliography ==
- Khin Maung Nyunt (1967). The Hardy Padaungs.
- Khin Maung Nyunt (1988). Market research of principal exports and imports of Burma with special reference to Thailand, 1970/71 to 1985/86. Institute of Asian Studies, Chulalongkorn University. ISBN 974-569-444-4.
- Khin Maung Nyunt (1990). Foreign loans and aid in the economic development of Burma, 1974/75 to 1985/86. Institute of Asian Studies, Chulalongkorn University. ISBN 974-577-175-9.
- Khin Maung Nyunt (1991). Pilgrim's guide to Yangon, Pagan, Mandalay, Sagaing, Mingun, Kyaington, Inle, Pintaya and Bago. p. 47.
- Khin Maung Nyunt (1998). The pagodas and monuments of Bagan. Vol. 2. Burma Ministry of Information. p. 147.
- Khin Maung Nyunt (1999). An Outline History of Myanmar Literature (Pagan Period to Kon-baung Period). Cāpe Bimānʻ. p. 92.
- Dr. Khin Maung Nyunt (2000). Kyaik Athok Ceti. Sule Pagoda Trustee. p. 208.
- Dr. Khin Maung Nyunt (2004). Selected Writings Of Dr. Khin Maung Nyunt. Myanmar: Myanmar Historical Commission. p. 146.
- Dr. Khin Maung Nyunt (2005). Myanmar Traditional Monthly Festivals. Innwa Publishing House. p. 147. ISBN 974-89667-7-1.
- Khin Maung Nyunt, Sein Myo Myint (U.) (2006). Myanmar painting: from worship to self-imaging. Education Pub. House. p. 191.
- Dr. Khin Maung Nyunt (2006). Radio talks on Myanma culture, Volume 1. Union of Myanmar, Ministry of Information. p. 214.
- Khin Maung Nyunt (2008). Myanmar gems. Today Publishing House. p. 130.
