= Ministry of Agriculture and Irrigation (Myanmar) =

- လယ်ယာစိုက်ပျိုးရေးနှင့် ဆည်မြောင်း ဝန်ကြီးဌာန
- Seal of the Ministry of Agriculture and Irrigation

Agency overview
- Preceding agency: Ministry of Agriculture, Livestock and Irrigation (Myanmar)
- Superseding agency: Ministry of Agriculture
- Jurisdiction: Government of Myanmar
- Headquarters: Naypyidaw; 19.7862975°N 96.1141331°E
- Minister responsible: Dr.Aung Thu
- Deputy Minister responsible: Dr. Tun Win
- Child agencies: Minister's Office; Water Resource Utilisation Department; Department of Agriculture; Irrigation Department; Agricultural Mechanisation Department; Settlement and Land Record Department; Department of Agricultural Planning; Myanma Agricultural Development Bank; Department of Agriculture Research; Yezin Agricultural University; Department of Industrial Crops Development; Department of Cooperative
- Website: www.moai.gov.mm

The Ministry of Agriculture and Irrigation (MOLI) was a ministry in the Burmese government responsible for agriculture and irrigation. Until 8 August 1996, it was named the Ministry of Agriculture. In 2016, President Htin Kyaw reconstituted it through a merger with the Ministry of Livestock, Fisheries and Rural Development as Ministry of Agriculture, Livestock and Irrigation.

== Departments ==
- Minister's Office
- Department of Agriculture
- Irrigation and Water Utilization Management Department
- Agricultural Mechanisation Department
- Department of Agriculture Land Management and Statistics
- Department of Planning
- Myanma Agricultural Development Bank
- Department of Agriculture Research
- Yezin Agricultural University
- Department of Industrial Crops Development
- Department of Cooperative
- Department of Fisheries
