= Myint Maung Maung =

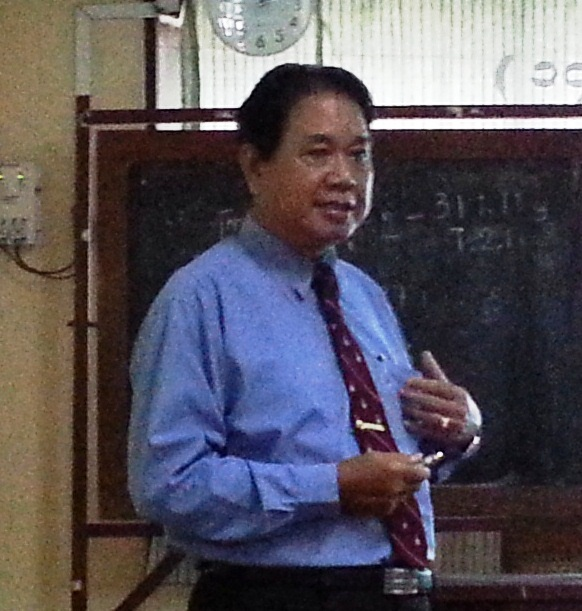
- Education: Royal College of Obstetricians and Gynaecologists
- Occupations: Obstetrician; gynecologist; writer
- Awards: Sayawun Tin Shwe Award (2011)

Myint Maung Maung (Burmese: မြင့်မောင်မောင်) is an obstetrician and gynecologist who became head of the North Okkalapa General Hospital in Burma. In May 2011 he received a Sayawun Tin Shwe Award.

Maung Maung graduated from the Royal College of Obstetricians and Gynaecologists in 1974. In November 1992, Maung Maung was a member of the department of obstetrics and gynecology at the Institute of Medicine in Yangon. He received a training grant from the World Health Organization Collaborating Centre for Research in Human Reproduction.

On 12 September 1998, as Medical Superintendent of North Okkalapa General Hospital, Maung Maung represented the hospital at a ceremony where cash donations were made for a trust fund to help poor and needy patients. The ceremony was attended by Minister at the Office of the Chairman of the State Peace and Development Council Brig-Gen David Abel, Minister for Mines Brig-Gen Ohn Myint, Minister for Information Maj-Gen Kyi Aung, Minister for Hotels and Tourism Maj-Gen Saw Lwin and Minister for Health Maj-Gen Ket Sein among other senior officials. On 24 August 2001 Maung Maung spoke at a ceremony attended by Minister at the Prime Minister's Office U Than Shwe and Minister for Livestock Breeding and Fisheries Brig-Gen. Maung Maung Thein at which K 2.46 million was distributed to buy medical equipment for the North Okkalapa General Hospital. In January 2001 he presided over a session of the Myanmar Health Research Congress.

On 7 April 2011 it was announced that Maung Maung was among the winners of the 9th Saya Wun Tin Shwe Literary Award. The award was given for his book A Collection of Articles on Reproduction Health.
