= Saw Mon Nyin =

Burmese author (1919–2011)

- စောမုံညင်း
- Born: Yin Yin (ရင်ရင်); 10 August 1919; Momeik, Shan State, British Burma
- Died: 12 December 2011 (aged 92); Yangon, Myanmar
- Education: University of Rangoon; Trinity College Dublin
- Occupation: Author
- Known for: Myanmar Women’s Clothing and Hairstyles
- Parent(s): San Tin; Daw Myo

Daw Yin Yin (10 August 1919 – 12 December 2011) also known as Saw Mon Nyin was a well-known Burmese author.

== Birth and education ==
Yin Yin was born in 1919 in Momeik in northern Shan State. As a child, she was able to visit other countries as a representative of the Myanmar Girl Guides. She adopted her pen name of "Saw Mon Nyin" when she was aged 17. Her first published article was written when she was in eighth standard. The article discussed gambling, and appeared in the Yadanar Thiha journal.

== Career ==
Starting in 1988, Yin Yin began broadcasting twice monthly for the Cultural Affairs program of the Myanmar Radio and Television Department. Yin Yin was a member of the Myanmar Language Commission, which prepared the Myanmar–English Dictionary, first published in 1993 by the Government of Myanmar. In 2004 she published her autobiography, her last book.

Yin Yin was a patron of the Myanmar Women Entrepreneurs Association and the Myanmar Maternal and Child Welfare Association. She was an advisor for Culture to the Myanmar Women's Affairs Federation and Advisor for Drama to the University of Culture Zat. She was a member of the central executive for the Myanmar Writers and Journalists Association (MWJA). She was chairperson of the National Literary Awards selection committee, and a judge for the Myanmar Traditional Cultural Performing Arts Competition.

Daw Yin Yin developed heart problems in 2008, and died peacefully at her home in Yangon on 12 December 2011, aged 92. She had outlived her husband and their two sons.

== Awards and recognition ==
Yin Yin won a National Literary Award for 1989 with her book Myanmar Women’s Clothing and Hairstyles . She won a Southeast Asia Literary Award in 2000. In January 2007 Daw Yin Yin received a Lifetime National Literary Award, presented by Secretary-1 Lieutenant-General Thein Sein. In May 2007 she won the Dr Tin Shwe Literary Award for her autobiography Saw Mone Nyin yae Saw Mone Nyin. She has also won a Pakokku U Ohn Pe Lifelong Achievement Award.

Writer Lae Twin Thar Saw Chit, chairman of the Myanmar Writers and Journalists Association, said Saw Mon Nyin's death was a "great loss... She dedicated her life to arts and literature... She was not only a good writer but also a very good speaker, making very interesting and amusing speeches to youths about culture and patriotism".
