= Htoo (name) =

Name list

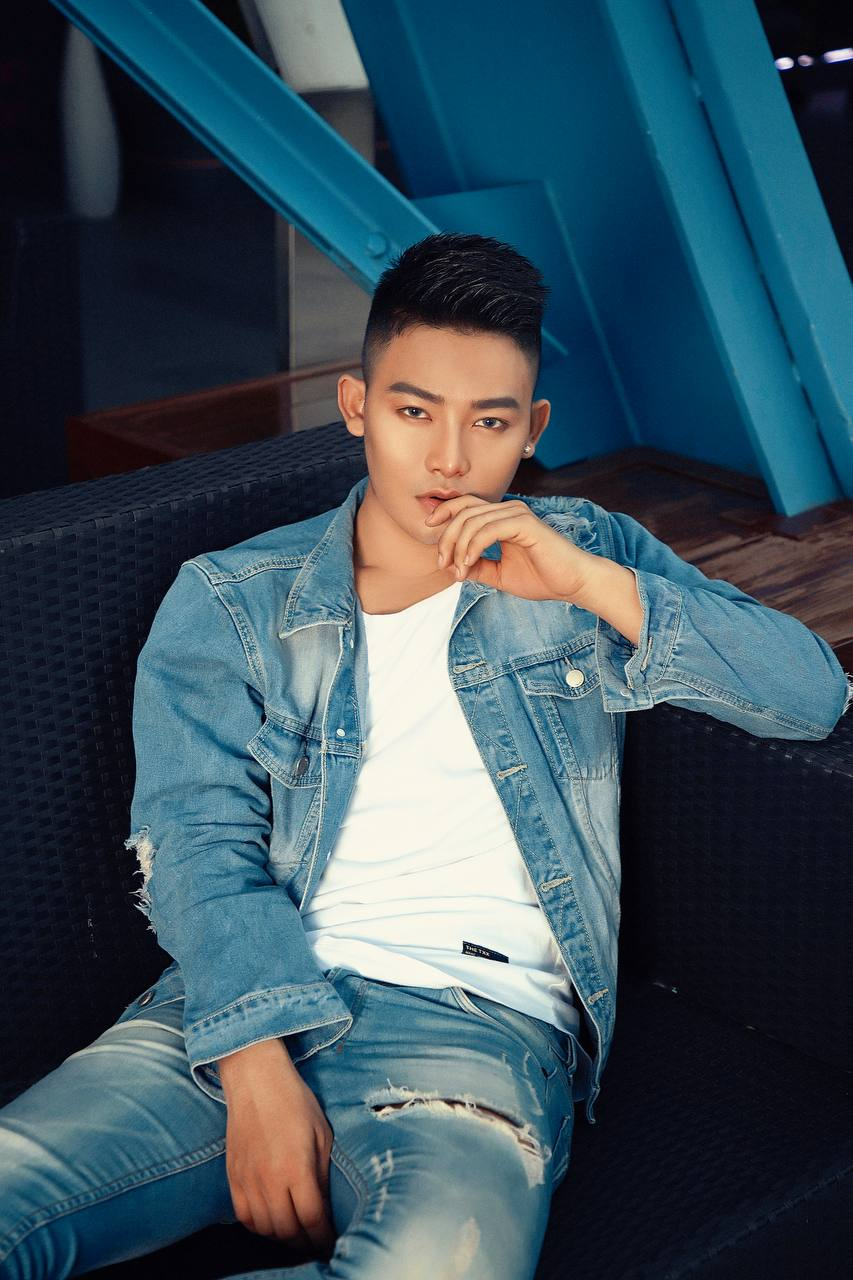
- Han Htoo Zen, Burmese actor and singer
- Language: Burmese

Other names
- Alternative spelling: Htu; Too

Htoo is a word used in Burmese names. The people of Myanmar have no customary matronymic or patronymic naming system and therefore have no surnames.

== Notable people with the name ==
- Ba Htoo (1916–1945), Burmese army officer
- Han Htoo, Burmese lawyer
- Han Htoo Zen (born 1993), Burmese actor and singer
- Johnny and Luther Htoo (born 1988), Burmese guerilla fighters
- Khin Khin Htoo (born 1965), Burmese writer
- Naw Sar Mu Htoo (born 1953), Burmese politician
- Nay Htoo Naing (born 1979), Burmese actor and film director
- Too Too (born 1990), Burmese Lethwei fighter

== See also ==
- Htun
- Naing
- Htan
