= Tinmaung =

- Village
- Location in Burma
- Coordinates: 25°55′N 95°10′E
- Country: Burma
- Region: Sagaing Region
- District: Naga Self-Administered Zone
- Township: Lahe Township
- Time zone: UTC+6.30 (MST)

Tinmaung is a village in Lahe Township, Naga Self-Administered Zone, in the Sagaing Region of northwestern Burma. It is located in the Naga Hills, near the Indian border, to the southwest of Htinpakhwe and northeast of Htun. At the centre of village life is a circle with a grey roofed building, located in its western part. Human sacrifice and headhunting has been documented in the Lahe Township.
