= Tun Foundation Bank =

Coordinates: 16.776328°N 96.164373°E

Tun Foundation Bank (TFB)
- Company type: Private
- Industry: Banking
- Founded: 1994; 32 years ago
- Headquarters: Myanmar
- Key people: Thein Tun, Chairman
- Products: Financial services
- Website: www.tunfoundationbankmyanmar.com

The Tun Foundation Bank (Burmese: ထွန်းဖောင်ဒေးရှင်းဘဏ်) is a privately owned bank in Myanmar that was established on 8 June 1994. All the profits from this bank go into scholarships for children from poor families.

== Operations ==
As of 2000 the bank was run by Thein Tun, Chairman of MGS Group of Companies. It is involved in social, educational and health projects. In 2000 the bank had recently opened new branches in Bayintnaung and Mandalay. In 2011 Myanmar's financial authorities introduced an online banking network system in six banks, one being the Tun Foundation Bank.

== Awards ==
=== Best painting competition ===
The Tun Foundation Bank has been holding its Best Painting of the Year awards since 2007 to encourage local artists. The Myanmar Traditional Artists and Artisans Association arranges for the judging committee for the contest. Judges from ASEAN countries and from China have been included, ensuring that quality is in line with international standards.

On 18 December 2008 the awards were announced at a ceremony at the Myanmar Bankers Association headquarters in Yankin township in Yangon. Ni Po Oo received the first prize of K3 million for his painting Simeekhwat Aka (Candle dance). The Exhibition and Competition for the Best Paintings of the Year 2010 was held at Myanmar Banker's Association Building on 11–15 December 2010. 250 artists competed and 300 paintings were selected. These were displayed at Gallery 65 from 18 to 31 December 2010, where they could be viewed and purchased. In October 2011 it was reported that the bank was looking for location for an art gallery to house works discovered from the Best Painting of the Year competition.

=== Literary awards ===
The bank established the Tun Foundation literary awards in 2006 to promote development of Myanmar literature. The scrutinizing committee gives awards for seven books, seven manuscripts and two books in English. Winners for books in 2006 included Khin Khin Htoo (history genre), Moe Moe Taraw San (biography), Junior Win (children literature), Win Maung (culture) Dr Soe Lwin (health), Dr Toe Hla (ancient treaties) and Maung Wun Tha (reference book). The awards complement the government's National Literature Award and Sarpay Beikman Manuscript Awards and the privately sponsored Sayawun Tin Shwe Award, Pakokku U Ohn Pe literary award and Thuta Swesone literary award.

On 2 April 2011 the fifth Tun Foundation Literary Award ceremony (2010) was held at the Myanmar Banks Association building. Attendees included the Minister for Information and for Culture U Kyaw Hsan and Chief Minister of Yangon Region U Myint Swe. U Hla Myaing (Ko Hsaung) won the Tun Foundation life-time literary award and Tun Oo Tin won the literary award for his book The biography of a diplomat.
