= May Zune Win =

Burmese travel blogger

- မေဇွန်ဝင်း
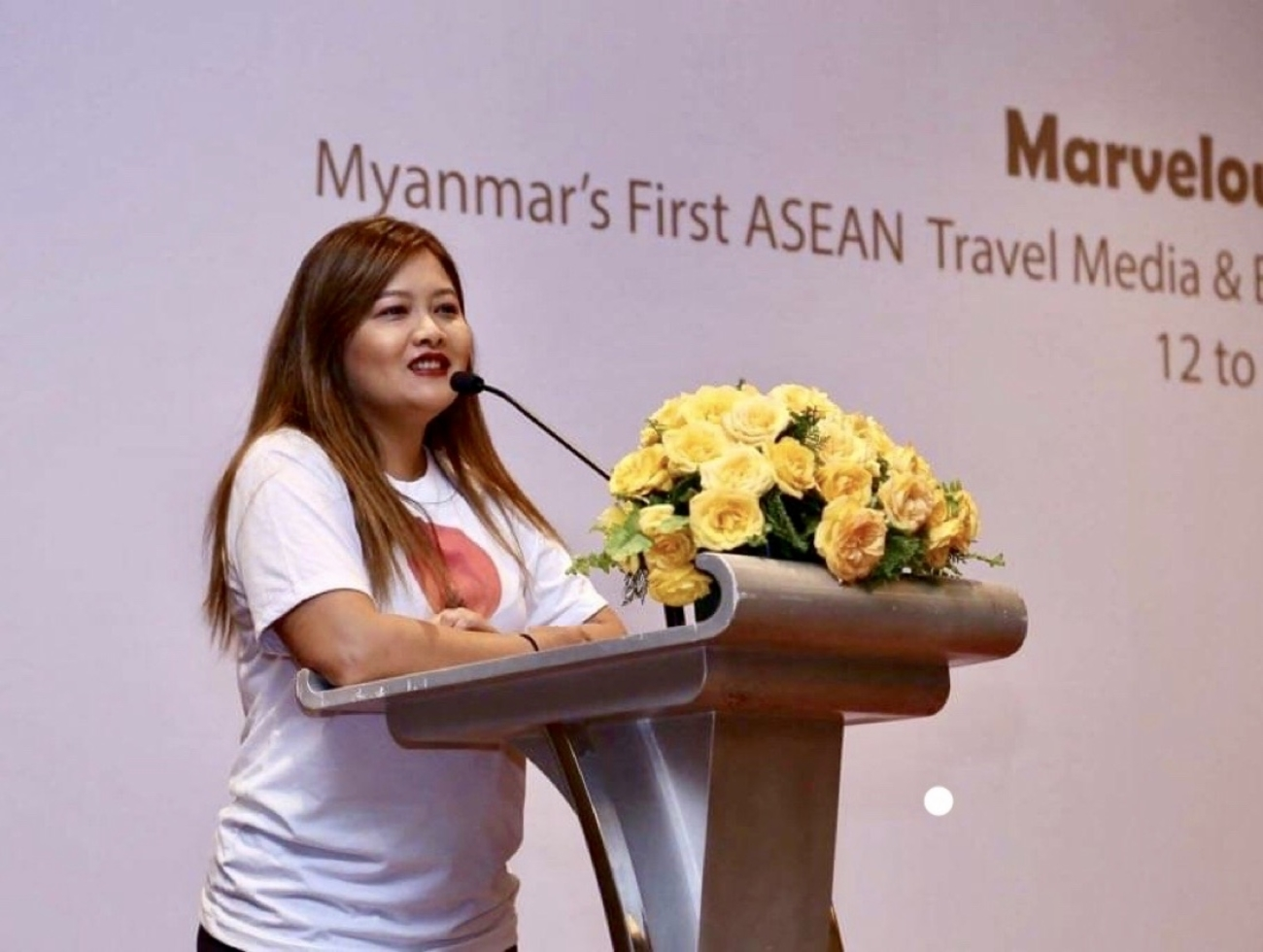
- May Zune Win in 2018
- Born: May Zune Win; 21 June 1983 (age 43); Pyinmana, Burma
- Other name: Ma May Zun (မမေဇွန်)
- Education: Dagon University
- Occupation: Travel blogger
- Years active: 2015–present
- Website: I Love Travelling

May Zune Win (Burmese: မေဇွန်ဝင်း; born 21 June 1983), is a Burmese travel blogger operating in Myanmar. She won the 2017 "Myanmar Influencer Award" for travel, and featured on The Myanmar Times "Top 10 Travel Bloggers" list in 2018, and the overall "Top 10 Bloggers" list in 2019.

== Early life and education ==
May Zune Win was born on 21 June 1983 in Pyinmana, Myanmar. She is the youngest child among four siblings, having an older sister and two older brothers. She graduated high school from Basic Education High School No. 2 Tamwe. She enrolled at the Dagon University and graduated with a Bachelor of Arts in English in 2016.

== Career ==
Starting in 2015, Zune Win was one of Myanmar's first travel bloggers, and has promoted Myanmar internationally as a destination, even during the military rule. She travelled around the globe and has shared her experiences on her Facebook blog I Love Travelling. She has travelled to 50 countries and wrote extensively about her experience as a tourist in each of them.

In 2017, she won the "Myanmar Travel Influencer Award", and was listed in the country's "Top 10 Bloggers" list of 2019 by The Myanmar Times.

In February 2018, she organised Myanmar's first "ASEAN Travel Media & Bloggers Trip" (FAM), a weeklong tour of Myanmar for travel journalists and bloggers based in the region, as part of efforts to repair the country's tarnished image abroad. She participated in the B2B literary talk made a discussion titled 'How do we try to be powerful and influential?' on 23 June 2019.

Zune Win is the managing director and owner of Eastward Travel Tours (or ET Tours).

== Political activities ==
Following the 2021 Myanmar coup d'état, May Zune Win was active in the anti-coup movement both in person at rallies and through social media. Denouncing the military coup, she has taken part in protests since February. She joined the "We Want Justice" three-finger salute movement. The movement was launched on social media, and many celebrities have joined the movement. On 2 April 2021, warrants for her arrest were issued under section 505 (a) of the Myanmar Penal Code by the State Administration Council for speaking out against the military coup. Along with several other celebrities, she was charged with calling for participation in the Civil Disobedience Movement (CDM) and damaging the state's ability to govern, with supporting the Committee Representing Pyidaungsu Hluttaw, and with generally inciting the people to disturb the peace and stability of the nation.

She eventually fled to the United States as a political refugee. On 17 February 2022, her homes and business property were confiscated by the military council.
