= Thein Tun (businessman) =

Burmese businessman (1937–2022)

- Born: 26 March 1937; Wakema Township, Irrawaddy Division, British Burma
- Died: 18 April 2022 (aged 85); Bangkok, Thailand
- Known for: Founder of Myanmar Golden Star
- Children: 3

Thein Tun (Burmese: သိန်းထွန်း; 26 March 1937 – 18 April 2022) was a Burmese businessman and founder of Myanmar Golden Star. He was best known for introducing Pepsi into the Burmese market through Myanmar Golden Star in 1991. He benefited from close connections with Tun Kyi, a former Burmese general.

== Early life ==
Thein Tun was born in Wakema Township, Irrawaddy Division (now Ayeyarwady Region).

== Career ==
In 1990, Thein Tun introduced Pepsi to the Burmese market, after PepsiCo entered into a 10-year joint venture with Thein Tun's Myanmar Golden Star (MGS). In 1997, amid new US sanctions on the Burmese military junta, PepsiCo exited the Burmese market. In 2014, he sold 70% of MGS' shares to Korean-owned Lotte Chilsung.

Thein Tun also founded Tun Foundation Bank. In 2014, he acquired majority stake in Myanmar Consolidated Media, which owns Myanmar Times. The newspaper suspended operations in February 2021, following the 2021 Myanmar coup d'état, after employees resigned en masse.

== Death ==
He died in Bangkok, Thailand on 18 April 2022.

== Personal life ==
Thein Tun was married to Nelly Than. He had 2 sons and one daughter. His son, Thant Zin Tun, is president of Mandalay Novotel Hotel and LP Holding Group, while another son, Oo Tun, is managing director of MGS Beverages. His only daughter, Mi Mi Tun, is an executive director at MGS Beverages. Thein Tun's son-in-law, Aung Moe Kyaw, owns International Beverages Trading.
