= Sayawun Tin Shwe Award =

The Sayawun Tin Shwe Literary Award (Burmese: ဆရာဝန်တင်ရွှေဆု) has been presented annually since November 2002 under the patronage of the Myanmar Writers and Journalists Association (MWJA). Non-fiction books published in the previous year are eligible. The awards are named after the writer Sayawun Tin Shwe. The awards complement the government's National Literary Awards and Sarpay Beikman Manuscript Awards and the Pakokku U Ohn Pe literary award, Thuta Swesone literary award and Tun Foundation award.

== Award years ==
=== 2001 ===
The first awards were presented on 6 November 2002 at the Myanmar Information and Communication Technology Park in Yangon. Winners for works published in 2001 were Pakokku U Ohn Pe in the Belles lettres category for Twaeya-kyonya-kyundaw-bawa (My experiences) and U Thein Khine in the general knowledge category for Naingngan-taka-ban-lokngan (International banking services - Laws and Procedures).

=== 2002 ===
The second Sayawun Tin Shwe awards were held in MICT Park, Hline Township of Yangon on 7 January 2004, attended by senior officials of the Myanmar Writers and Journalists Association. Awards were given to awards to U Tin Hlaing (Ledwintha Saw Chit) for Upadiyok (Appearance) and to U Tin Oo (Naga Tin Oo) for Sanaytha-ei-bawa-taik-pwe-mya (Life struggles of the Saturday-born man).

=== 2003 ===
In the March 2005 ceremony, for works published in 2003, Daw Win Win Myint won an award for Pan ta Pwint ye Yin Khon Than (The Heartbeat of a Flower), a biography of actress and vocalist Daw May Shin. Dr. Daw Myint Myint Khin won an award for Thet She Kyan Mar Myanmar Ah Sar (Healthy Myanmar Food). A new award was added for an English-language publication, won by U Ba Than for Myanmar Delights and Attractions.

=== 2005 ===
In the May 2007 ceremony, Daw Yin Yin (Saw Mon Nyin) won an award for her autobiography Saw Mone Nyin yae Saw Mone Nyin.

=== 2006 ===
The sixth award ceremony organized by the Myanmar Writers and Journalists Association was held at Traders Hotel, Yangon on 6 April 2008. Winners were Dr Tin Aung Aye, Maung Wunna, Naing Zaw and Kaythipan U Hla Myint.

=== 2008 ===
The eighth awards were presented on 1 March 2010 at the Traders Hotel in Yangon. Brigadier-General Kyaw Hsan, the Minister for Information, attended the ceremony. Award winners were Maung Hsu Shin for Eain Dwin Tha Mar Daw (Interior Physician), Chit Oo Nyo for Background of Literature Talk, Profile of U Aung Thin and other Journal Articles, Dr Aung Gyi for Tha Chin Lu, Pone Pyin Lu, Nyein Chan Lu (Person With Song, Person With Story, Person with Peace), and Maung Yint Mar (Kyauk Kone) for Mg Nge Nge Ka Kha Yae Oo Hnit Ratha Sar Dam Myar (You Were My First Star Flower When I Was Young & Other Fictional Essays).

=== 2009 ===
The ninth awards were held on 1 May 2011 at the Strand Hotel on Seikkantha Street in Yangon. Attendees were addressed by the Union Minister for Information and for Culture U Kyaw Hsan. He presented an award to Maung Swe Thet for his book From Kaduma to Mawpha. Other winners were Nanda Thein Zan for Naung-ta-kin-ya-tho, Professor Dr Myint Maung Maung for his A Collection of Articles on Reproduction Health and Maung Khaing Zaw for Knowledgeable Facts about Myanmar Traditional Culture and Heritage.
