= North Okkalapa General Hospital =

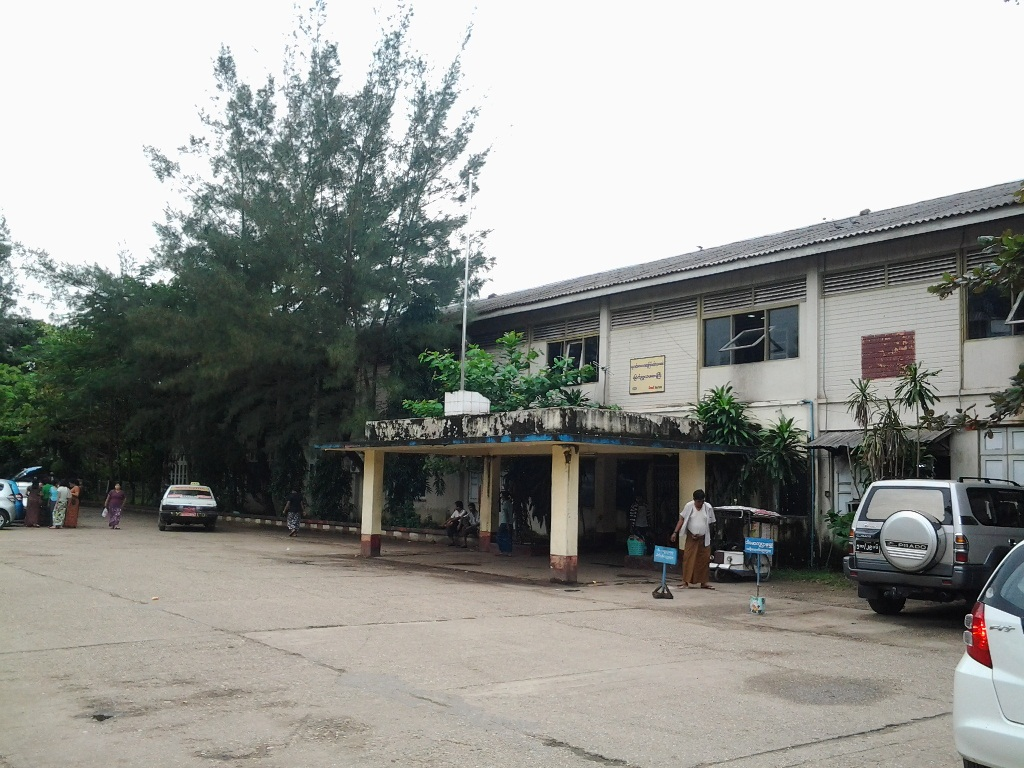

- Location within Myanmar

Geography
- Location: North Okkalapa Township, Yangon Region, Myanmar
- Coordinates: 16.901184°N 96.157258°E

Organisation
- Type: Teaching and General Hospital
- Affiliated university: University of Medicine 2, Yangon

Services
- Emergency department: Yes
- Beds: 800

History
- Founded: 1940

Links
- Lists: Hospitals in Myanmar

The North Okkalapa General Hospital is an affiliated teaching hospital of the University of Medicine 2, Yangon, located in North Okkalapa Township in the eastern part of Yangon, Myanmar.

== Structure ==
The North Okkalapa General Hospital was affiliated to the University of Medicine 2, Yangon in 1970. On 25 September 1996, the University moved to its present location in North Okkalapa beside the hospital. The hospital was originally designed to hold 400 beds. Although the building has not been expanded, it now holds 800 beds. In 2002, North Okkalapa General Hospital was the fourth in the country to establish a neurology center. As of 2007, it had two neurologists and one neurosurgeon.

== Fundraising ==
On 12 September 1998, the Medical Superintendent of North Okkalapa General Hospital, Dr Myint Maung Maung represented the hospital at a ceremony where cash donations were made for a trust fund to help the poor and needy patients. On 24 August 2001, Professor Myint Maung Maung spoke at a ceremony at which K 2.46 million was distributed to buy medical equipment for the North Okkalapa General Hospital.

== Patients ==
A significant number of the patients served by the hospital are poor.

A study was made of 2,613 infants delivered at North Okkalapa General Hospital between January and September 1990. 21.1% of the babies had low birth weight, with 18.1% being due to intrauterine growth retardation and 3% due to preterm births. Patients who have been involved in traffic accidents often cannot afford to buy implants.

The hospital staff understand the latest orthopedic care technologies, but lack the funds to buy instruments such as curved awls and reamer. Pre-operative surgical planning is handicapped by the need to conserve X-ray film.

In April 2009, there was an epidemic of diarrhea in North Okkalapa Township. Local hospitals admitted over 100 people suffering from severe diarrhea. There were rumors that the diarrhea was caused by cholera and had also resulted in some deaths. However, officials at the Ministry of Health and North Okkalapa General Hospital refused to provide any information.

== Main Department ==
- Admin Department
- Emergency Department
- Medical Department
- Surgical Department
- Orthopaedic Department
- Paediatric Department
- Obstetric & Gynaecology Department
- Neurosurgical Department

== Specialties ==
- Emergency Medicine
- Cardiac Medical Department
- Neuro Medical Department
- Neuro Surgical Department
- Hepatology Department
- Haematology Department
- Rheumatology Department
- Ophthalmology Department
- Orthopaedics Department
- Dermatology Department
- Radiology Department
- Special Care Baby Unit
- Nuclear Medicine Department
- Physical Medicine & Rehabilitation
- Diabetic Clinic
- Dentistry Clinic
- Psychiatric Medicine
- ENT Clinic

== Diagnostic Department ==
- Radiology Department
- Pathology Department

== Supportive Department ==
- Forensic Medicine Department
- Blood Bank
- Medicinal Record Department
- Medical Social Worker Department
- Medical Store
- Kitchen
- Laundry
- Motor Transport

== See also ==
- List of hospitals in Yangon
