= Nay Myo Thant =

Burmese writer (born 1943)

- နေမျိုးသန့်
- Born: 1 October 1943 (age 82); Ywange, Pakkoku, British Burma
- Other name: Tin Myint
- Education: Rangoon University
- Occupation: Writer
- Parent(s): Ba Hsan; Aye Kwe
- Awards: Sarpay Beikman Manuscript Awards (2000); Pakokku U Ohn Pe literary award (2006)

Nay Myo Thant (Burmese: နေမျိုးသန့်; จำรัส ทัศนละวาด) is a Burmese writer. His books include two volumes of short stories published in 1993 and 1997.

Nay Myo Thant won first prize in the collected short stories genre in the Sarpay Beikman Manuscript Awards for 2000. He won third prize for 2006 Collected short stories in the Pakokku U Ohn Pe literary award. He won first prize in the novel genre of the Sarpay Beikman awards for 2008. He also won third prize for short stories in the Pakokku U Ohn Pe literary award for 2008. He won first prize in the youth literature genre of the Sarpay Beikman awards for 2009.
