= Ministry of Agriculture, Livestock and Irrigation (Myanmar) =

Government ministry of Myanmar

Ministry of Agriculture Livestock and Irrigation
- စိုက်ပျိုးရေး၊မွေးမြူရေးနှင့်ဆည်မြောင်းဝန်ကြီးဌာန
- Seal of the Ministry of Agriculture, Livestock and Irrigation

Agency overview
- Formed: 30 March 2016
- Preceding agencies: Ministry of Livestock, Fisheries and Rural Development; Ministry of Agriculture and Irrigation; Ministry of Cooperatives
- Jurisdiction: Government of Myanmar
- Headquarters: Office No (15) and Office No (36), Naypyidaw; 19.7862975°N 96.1141331°E
- Minister responsible: Min Naung
- Deputy Minister responsible: Dr Aung Gyi
- Website: www.moali.gov.mm

Ministry of Agriculture, Livestock and Irrigation (Burmese: စိုက်ပျိုးရေး၊မွေးမြူရေးနှင့် ဆည်မြောင်းဝန်ကြီးဌာန); abbreviated MOALI) is a ministry in Myanmar which was composed of three former ministries, Ministry of Livestock, Fisheries and Rural Development, Ministry of Agriculture and Irrigation and Ministry of Cooperatives.

== Departments ==
seal of the ministry (2016 - 2021)

- Union Minister Office
- Department of Agriculture (DOA)
- Department of Planning
- Department of Agriculture Land Management and Statistics
- Irrigation and Water Utilization Management Department
- Agricultural Mechanization Department
- Department of Agricultural Research
- Small-scale Industries Department
- Livestock Breeding and Veterinary Department
- Department of Fisheries
- Yezin Agricultural University
- University of Veterinary Science

Department of Rural Development and Department of Cooperatives were formed as Ministry of Cooperatives and Rural Development in June 2021.
