= Maung Yint Mar =

Burmese author

Maung Yint Mar (Kyaunggon) (Burmese: မောင်ရင့်မာ (ကျောင်းကုန်း)) is a Burmese author.

In 1991 he won 2nd prize in the Short Stories category of the 1990 Sarpay Beikman manuscript awards for his Kyaung-gin Tha-moddayar hnint Maha Myintmo. In May 2007 he won an essay award at the Second Shwe Amuté Literary Awards ceremony, which was held at the Park Royal Hotel in Yangon. His book Mg Nge Nge Ka Kha Yae Oo Hnit Ratha Sar Dam Myar (You Were My First Star Flower When I Was Young & Other Fictional Essays) won a Dr Tin Shwe Literary Award for 2008.
