= Ye Htut =

Burmese presidential spokesperson

His Excellency Ye Htut
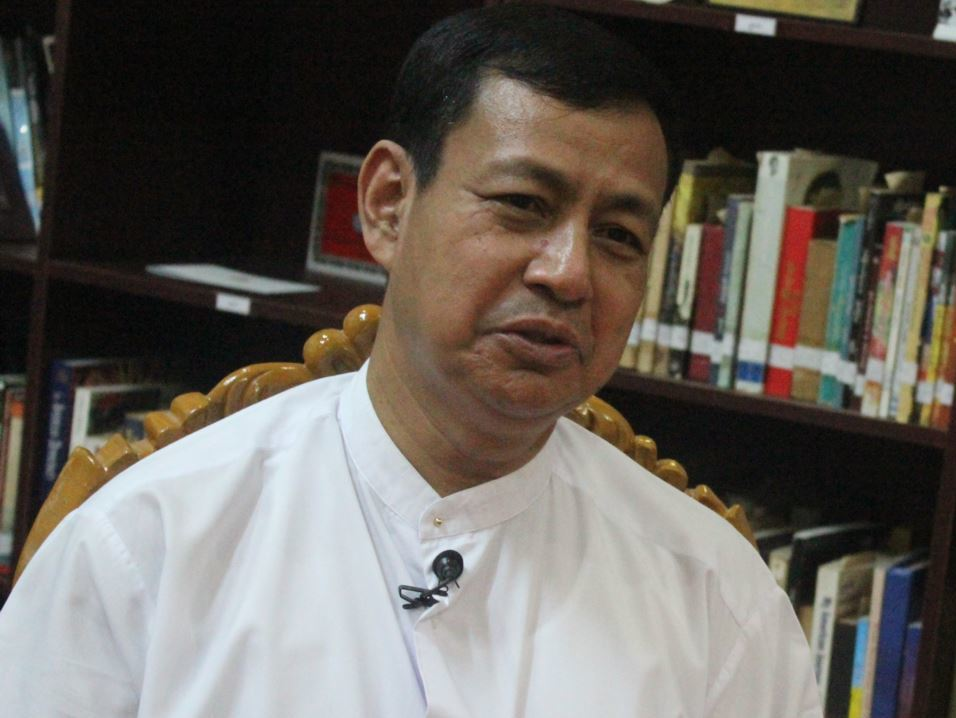
- Ye Htut in 2014

Minister for Information of Myanmar
- In office 1 August 2014 – 30 March 2016
- President: Thein Sein
- Preceded by: Aung Kyi
- Succeeded by: Pe Myint

Spokesperson for the President
- In office February 2013 – 30 March 2016

Deputy Minister of Information of Myanmar
- In office 31 August 2012 – 1 August 2014
- Preceded by: Soe Win

Deputy Director General/Director General at the Ministry of Information
- In office 2005 – 31 August 2012
- Succeeded by: Tint Swe

Personal details
- Born: 1959 (age 66–67)
- Party: Union Solidarity and Development Party
- Spouse: Khin Sandar Tun
- Occupation: Military Personnel, Civil Servant, Academics
- Website: www.facebook.com/ye.htut.988

Military service
- Allegiance: Myanmar
- Branch/service: Myanmar Army
- Years of service: 1977–2005
- Rank: Lieutenant Colonel

Ye Htut (Burmese: ရဲထွဋ်, [jɛ́ tʰʊʔ]) is a Burmese military officer who previously served as presidential spokesman from 2013 to 2016 and later as minister for the Ministry of Information (Myanmar) from 2014 to 2016 in the Thein Sein's Cabinet. He left the office in 2016 and worked as visiting senior research fellow at the ISEAS-Yusof Ishak Institute in Singapore until July 2019.

== Career ==
=== Military career ===
Ye Htut applied to Defence Services Academy but initially failed it first time, so enrolled at Rangoon University. He applied again and accepted for the academy's 22nd intake in 1977. After graduation in 1981, he was dispatched to Kayin State, where he would spend five years fighting the Karen National Union along the Myanmar-Thai border.

Over the next 16 years, he served in Tanintharyi Region, Kayin State, Kachin State and near Naypyitaw, before landing as the chief instructor at a training facility in southern Shan State in 2002. He also contributed articles for the army's Myawady news journal.

According to an interview with Ludu Media, Ye Htut stated that Thura Shwe Mann had been both a mentor and a teacher to him. He explained that Shwe Mann had shown him considerable support when he was serving as a lieutenant colonel without promotion for an extended period while stationed in a small town in Shan State. Due to social and health difficulties faced by his family, he sought assistance from Shwe Mann to secure a transfer either to Yangon or to a civilian post. In response, Shwe Mann spoke on his behalf to his friend, then–Minister of Information Brigadier General Kyaw Hsan. As a result, he was transferred to the Ministry of Information.

=== In office ===
He was retired as a lieutenant colonel in Tatmadaw and took up the post of deputy director general at the Department of Information and Public Relations under the Ministry of Information in 2005. He was promoted as the director general of the department in 2009, which has been viewed as a propaganda machine for the military government.

He became deputy minister for the Ministry of Information in August 2012 when the former minister Kyaw Hsan and deputy ministers were reshuffled to other ministries. He became spokesperson for the President Thein Sein in February 2013.

On July 30, 2014, he was nominated to be Minister for the Ministry of Information. On August 1, the Pyidaungsu Hluttaw confirmed his nomination. He left the office and USDP party in 2016.

=== 2021 Myanmar coup d'état ===
On 29 October 2023, he was arrested by the SAC under Section 505 (a), accusing him of encouraging dissent against the military junta. On 29 November 2023, he was sentenced to three years behind bars for "disseminating untrue information" and an additional seven years for "inciting rebellion," contravening Sections 505(a) and 124(a) of Myanmar Penal Code.

Ye Htut was released under a pardon granted by the junta on 4 January 2026, marking Myanmar's Independence Day.

== Public image ==
He is an active Facebook user, has an official account on the social media site where he often shares news from the government and the military and writes his opinions through his Facebook account. He earned the nickname Facebook minister for his frequent use of Facebook.

In 2012, Media reports, particularly those in Eleven Media, suggested that he was behind the blog posts known by the pen name Dr Sate Phwar, who criticized the legislature for acting above the law. However, he denied that the accusations linking him to Dr Seik Phwar. The Pyidaungsu Hluttaw formed a commission to investigate the identity of Dr Seik Phwar after the blogger wrote an article criticising parliament. The commission's chairman said they found evidence that could implicate him. However, the commission failed to disclose the identity of Dr Seik Phwar, after five months of investigation.

In June 2014, he posted an apology note on his Facebook account after a storm of criticism followed his wife's sharing of a photoshopped image of opposition leader Aung San Suu Kyi in Hijab. His wife deleted her Facebook account after screenshots of her post were spread by other Facebook users.

== Academic career ==
He served as a visiting senior research fellow at the ISEAS – Yusof Ishak Institute in Singapore until July 2019 and authored Myanmar's Political Transition and Lost Opportunities, 2010–2016.

== Personal life ==
He married Khin Sandar Tun. His father, Shwe Than, was formerly the Chief of Burma Police Force and a People's Assembly representative during the socialist era. Ye Htut is a brother-in-law of Zeya Aung, a former government minister and military officer.
