= Bawk Ja =

Burmese politician

Bawk Ja Lum Nyoi
- ဘောက်ဂျာ
- Born: 4 December 1967 (age 58); Burma
- Education: Yangon University
- Occupations: Activist, Politician
- Political party: National Democratic Force

Bawk Ja Lum Nyoi (Burmese: ဘောက်ဂျာ, born 4 December 1967) is an ethnic Kachin land rights activist and politician from Burma (Myanmar). She serves as the chair of the National Democratic Force's Kachin State branch. She lives in Aungya village, Hpakant Township.

== Early life and education ==
She matriculated from Basic Education High School in Kyauktada Township, Rangoon. In 1993, she graduated from Yangon University with a Bachelor of Arts degree in History.

== Career ==
In October 2010, she led a group of Hukawng Valley farmers whose lands had been confiscated (over 220,000 acres (890 km^{2}) of farmland), and sued Yuzana Company and its chairman Htay Myint (MP), over the illegal land confiscations. Her advocacy work brought her national attention.

In the 2010 Burmese general election, she contested the a seat in the Pyithu Hluttaw for the Hpakant Township constituency, running against Ohn Myint, a former military general. The Union Election Commission (UEC) declared Ohn Myint the winner, despite fraud allegations and voting irregularities. Ohn Myint had won the election by a margin of 7,793 votes, with a massive 13,255 votes declared invalid.

On 7 January 2011, she submitted an official grievance to the UEC. As part of a bargain between Ohn Myint, she agreed to withdraw her complaint contingent on Ohn Myint's commitment to pave roads in the township and suspend the Myitsone Dam project.

In the 2012 Burmese by-elections, she announced her intent to contest the same seat (as Ohn Myint had vacated it to become a cabinet-level minister), but her constituency was among three withdrawn by the government following renewed fighting between the Burmese military and the Kachin Independence Army (KIA).

In July 2013, she was arrested on politically motivated charges of negligent homicide of a man killed in 2008. The deceased victim's wife, Kai Am, asked to withdraw the charges in September 2013. She was freed on 24 January 2014.
