= Ministry of Cooperatives (Myanmar) =

- သမဝါယမဝန်ကြီးဌာန

Agency overview
- Formed: 5 April 1951; 75 years ago
- Preceding agencies: Ministry of State Cooperative and Commodity Distribution; Ministry of Civil Supply and Cooperatives
- Dissolved: March 30, 2016
- Type: Ministry
- Jurisdiction: Government of Burma
- Headquarters: Naypyidaw
- Minister responsible: Dr. Aung Thu
- Website: www.myancoop.gov.mm

The Ministry of Cooperatives (Burmese: သမဝါယမဝန်ကြီးဌာန was a former ministry in Myanmar that administered the country's agricultural cooperative policies.

The ministry was founded as the Ministry of State Cooperative and Commodity Distribution on 5 April 1951. It was merged with Ministry of Civil Supply Services on 26 March 1962 to form the Ministry of Civil Supply and Cooperatives, and separated again on 18 June 1965.

The Ministry was led by Dr. Aung Thu, who was appointed by President U Htin Kyaw under the Ministry of Agriculture, Livestock and Irrigation in May 2016.

== See also ==
- Cabinet of Burma
