= Tin Shwe =

Sayawun Tin Shwe
- ဆရာဝန် တင်ရွှေ
- Born: Tin Shwe; 1936; Moulmein, British Burma
- Died: 2000 (aged 63–64); Myanmar
- Education: Moulmein Intermediate College; Rangoon Medical College
- Occupation: Writer
- Spouse: Aye Thant
- Children: Tyn Tyn Aye; Thet Thet Shwe; Thet Lwin Shwe
- Parent(s): Pa; Shin Shin
- Awards: National Literature Award

Sayawun Tin Shwe (Burmese: တင်ရွှေ; died December 2000) was a prominent physician and author in Myanmar.

He was a committee member of the Myanmar Writers and Journalists Association (MWJA), and founded the Tin Shwe publishing house.

His widow, Aye Thant, established the annual Sayawun Tin Shwe Award in his memory. This award, given with the assistance of the Myanmar Writers and Journalists Association, gives awards for new books to encourage the development of Myanmar literature.

Sayawun Tin Shwe was Medical Superintendent of the Htaukkyant Leprosarium, near Rangoon. He wrote fiction as well as medical articles.

In 1963, Tin Shwe won the National Literature Award in the General Knowledge Literature category. In August 1996 Dr. Tin Shwe of the Medical Research Department was a member of a delegation of Myanmar writers that visited Russia. In June 2000 Tin Shwe was Chairman of the MWJA Health and Welfare Work Committee.

== Bibliography ==
- Sayawin Tin Shwe; et al. (1983). The Big Haunted House and Other Stories. Sri Lanka National Commission for UNESCO. ISBN 955-9043-22-6.
- Sayawin Tin Shwe. Medical doctors in post-1947 Burma (in Burmese).
- Sayawin Tin Shwe. Medicinal plants from Burma and other countries; their properties and uses (in Burmese).
- Sayawin Tin Shwe. Biographies of pioneers in medical sciences in Burma (in Burmese).
