= Theikpan Soe Myint Naing =

Author of childrens' books

Theikpan Soe Myint Naing (Burmese: သိပ္ပံစိုးမြင့်နိုင်) is a writer of children's books in Burma. He has received a National Literary Award and has twice received Sarpay Beikman Manuscript Awards. His work has appeared in various magazines.

On 2 December 1993 it was announced that he had won a National Literary Award in the children's literature category for his Nyi-htwelay atwet Khalay Kabyar-myar. In November 2004 he was declared first-place winner of the children's literature category of the Sarpay Beikman Manuscript Awards. He received the award from Minister for Home Affairs Maj-Gen Maung Oo in a ceremony held at the National Theatre on Myoma Kyaung Street in Yangon on 12 December 2004. On 31 December 2009 Theikpan Soe Myint Naing received the second prize in the Children's Literature category of the Sarpay Beikman Manuscript Awards for 2008 from Minister for Culture Maj-Gen Khin Aung Myint.

In September 2003 he was one of the contributors to the Union Solidarity and Development Association 10th anniversary magazine. Junior Leader magazine of June 2004 carried his poem "Charity everyday [sic]". The same month The Guardian carried his poem on "Oh Monsoon - Move In". His poems for children appeared in the Customs Magazine 2009, published by the Customs Department of Myanmar.
