= Aung Toe =

Senior judge in Myanmar (died 2021)

The Honourable Aung Toe
- အောင်တိုး

Chief Justice of Myanmar
- In office September 1988 – 30 March 2011
- Preceded by: Tin Aung Hein
- Succeeded by: Htun Htun Oo

Personal details
- Born: 1924 or 1925 Myanmar
- Died: 24 May 2021 (aged 96)
- Education: B.A., B.L.
- Alma mater: Rangoon University
- Occupation: Lawyer

Aung Toe (Burmese: အောင်တိုး [àʊɰ̃ tó]; 1924/5 – 24 May 2021) was Chief Justice of the Supreme Court of Myanmar (Burma) from 1988 to 2011. Aung Toe served as Chief Justice of Myanmar for a total of twenty-two and-a-half-years, making him the longest-serving Chief Justice of Myanmar in the history of post-independence Myanmar.

He said, "although there may be some diversity between countries of ASEAN, we share the common sentiments of loving kindness, compassion and desire to help one another in times of need. They represent the noble spirit of the peoples of Southeast Asia".
