= Naing Win Swe =

Burmese writer and poet

Naing Win Swe နိုင်ဝင်းဆွေ
- Born: 5 April 1941; Chinkyone, Taungoo, British Burma
- Died: 24 February 1995 (aged 53); Marnalpalaw, Kayin State, Myanmar
- Occupation: novelist
- Writing career
- Pen name: Naing Win Swe
- Period: 1968–1978
- Genres: Romance, Short story
- Notable works: Ngwe Ta Nya (One Summer Night); Ma Thein Shin Si Pote Pay Bar (Please send this to Ma Thein Shin)
- Notable awards: Myanmar National Literature Award (1971)

Naing Win Swe (Burmese: နိုင်ဝင်းဆွေ; 1940–1995) was a prominent Burmese writer and poet.

He wrote some famous Burmese short stories and novels as revolutionist and patriot. After the failed 8888 Uprising he left Burma. He was killed in a jungle on the Thai Border in 1995 by the Burmese Army.

The legend is that, as he lay dead on the battleground his comrades picked wild flowers and covered his remains with the flowers before they retreated as they didn't have enough time to bury him.

Naing Win Swe's most famous book was "Ma Thein Shin Si Pote Pay Bar Burmese: မသိန်းရှင်ဆီပို့ပေးပါ (1971)" a fictionalized semi-autobiographical novel. The story is a tragic love story of a smuggler-girl and a train-ticket-inspector on the Taung Dwin Gyi – Kyaukpaaung shuttle-train in middle Burma in late 1960s at the height of military-Socialist repression during General Ne Win's long rein.

None of Naing Win Swe's novels have been published in English translation, but Naing Win Swe's poem "Willow Tree" Burmese: မိုးမခပင် is featured in the Foreign Policy in Focus website of the Institute for Policy Studies.
