= Ohn Myint (politician) =

Burmese politician

H.E. Ohn Myint
- အုန်းမြင့်

Minister for Livestock, Fisheries and Rural Development
- In office March 2011 – 30 March 2016
- Preceded by: Tin Naing Thein
- Succeeded by: Aung Thu

Minister for Cooperatives
- In office March 2011 – September 2012
- Preceded by: Tin Htut
- Succeeded by: Kyaw Hsan

Pyithu Hluttaw MP
- In office April 2010 – March 2011
- Preceded by: Constituency established
- Constituency: Hpakant Township, Kachin State
- Majority: 29,426 (51.58%)

Personal details
- Born: Burma
- Party: Union Solidarity and Development Party
- Spouse: Nu Nu Swe
- Children: Kyaw Thura, Kyaw Thiha
- Occupation: Soldier

Military service
- Allegiance: Myanmar
- Branch/service: Myanmar Army
- Years of service: 2010
- Rank: Lieutenant general

Ohn Myint (Burmese: အုန်းမြင့်) was the Burmese Minister for Livestock, Fisheries and Rural Development from 2011 to 2016. From March 2011 to August 2012, he concurrently served as the Minister of Cooperatives, until he vacated the post in September after a reshuffle of President Thein Sein's cabinet.

Ohn Myint appears on the European Union list of sanctioned regime members, as he served as a member of the State Peace and Development Council, the military regime that ruled Burma until 2010. He is married to Nu Nu Swe.

In 2010, he resigned from the military, in order to stand as a Union Solidarity and Development Party candidate in the 2010 Burmese general election. He won a Pyithu Hluttaw seat representing Hpakant Township in Kachin State by a majority of 29,426, defeating his primary opponent, Bawk Ja from the National Democratic Force, an ethnic Kachin activist.

== Controversy ==
In January 2014, a controversial video of Ohn Myint speaking to residents at Thityakauk village in Magway Region during a 28 January visit surfaced. In that video, Ohn Myint used profanity and vulgar language toward the residents, who were pleading for clean potable water in the village. He also threatened to slap and imprison residents who inquired about the government's water access initiatives. In part of the diatribe, Ohn Myint said "I don’t care about anybody. Anyone can write and say anything about me. I’m not afraid to die, so what else should I be afraid of? I don’t give a damn. I am that kind of person. I don’t give shit."

His colleague, Minister of Information, Aung Kyi, defended Ohn Myint's words. In response, the National League for Democracy introduced a motion in the Pyithu Hluttaw to debate and reprimand Ohn Myint's language. President Thein Sein has reportedly reprimanded Ohn Myint for his language, but activists continue to call for his dismissal. On 3 February 2014, activists from the Democratic Force staged a protest near Mahabandoola Park in Yangon. The residents of Thityagauk village have demanded his resignation. Their application to stage a protest on 13 February was blocked by Magwe Region police.

== Military career ==
Ohn Myint is a former Lieutenant General and Chief of the Tatmadaw's Bureau of Special Operations-6. He also served the following military posts:

- Northern Command Commander
- Coastal Region Command Commander
- SPDC official for Kachin State
