= Maung Oo =

Minister of Home Affairs
- In office 5 November 2004 – 30 March 2011
- Preceded by: Colonel Tin Hlaing
- Succeeded by: Lieutenant General Ko Ko

Personal details
- Born: 1952 (age 73–74)
- Citizenship: Burmese

Major-General Maung Oo (born 1952) is a prominent member of the military government of Burma. He served as Minister of Home Affairs for many years.

== Military career ==
For a period Major-General Maung Oo was regional commander of Rakhine State. In July 2011 the Rakhine Nationality Development Party (RNDP) General Secretary U Oo Hla Saw said "He looted this land while he was a regional commander here and his soldiers guarded the land".

== Minister of Home Affairs ==
Maung Oo was appointed Minister of Home Affairs on 5 November 2004. In December 2004 Major-General Maung Oo participated in the Sarpay Beikman Manuscript Awards ceremony, handing out some of the prizes for unpublished literary works. In December 2009, he again participated in the Sarpay Beikman awards.

In January 2010 Maung Oo said in a speech that pro-democracy leader Aung San Suu Kyi could be released in November of that year on the expiry of her current period of house arrest. Speaking in parliament in March 2011 Maung Oo said that this was not the time to discuss amnesty for political prisoners. He pointed out that under the 2008 constitution an amnesty could only be granted by the President on the advice of the National Defense and Security Council (NDSC). The president had not yet taken office and the NDSC had not yet been formed.

== Political activity ==
In 2011 Maung Oo was head of the disciplinary committee of the Union Solidarity and Development Party (USDP). He is close friend of former Senior General Than Shwe. Speaking in May 2011 in Pauktaw Township in Rakhine State he asserted that power had been transferred to the USDP, and not to the parliament that had recently been elected. He attacked Chin people, saying most of them were illiterate and could not be ministers in the union assembly.
