= Tet Htun Aung =

Burmese politician

Member of the Amyotha Hluttaw
- Incumbent
- Assumed office 1 February 2016
- Constituency: Rakhine State No. 2

Personal details
- Born: 16 June 1956 (age 69) Rakhine State, Burma (Myanmar)
- Party: Rakhine National Party
- Spouse: Ma Aye Khin
- Parent(s): Maung San Pwint (father); Sein Hla Oo (mother)

Tet Htun Aung (Burmese: တက်ထွန်းအောင်, pronounced [tɛʔ tʰʊ́ɴʔ àʊɴ], born 16 June 1956) is a Burmese politician who currently serves as a Regional Hluttaw MP for Pauktaw Township No. 2 constituency and an Amyotha Hluttaw MP for Rakhine State No. 2 Constituency. He is a member of Rakhine National Party.

== Early life and education ==
He was born on 16 June 1956 in Rakhine State, Burma (Myanmar). He had served as Secretary of Arakan National Party Pauktaw Township and as Central Executive Committee of Finance.

== Political career ==
He is a member of the Rakhine National Party. In the 2015 Myanmar general election, he was elected as an Amyotha Hluttaw MP and elected representative from Rakhine State No. 2 parliamentary constituency. He also serves as the Regional Hluttaw MP for Pauktaw Township No. 2 constituency.
