= Pe Myint =

Burmese politician

His Excellency Dr Pe Myint
- ဖေမြင့်
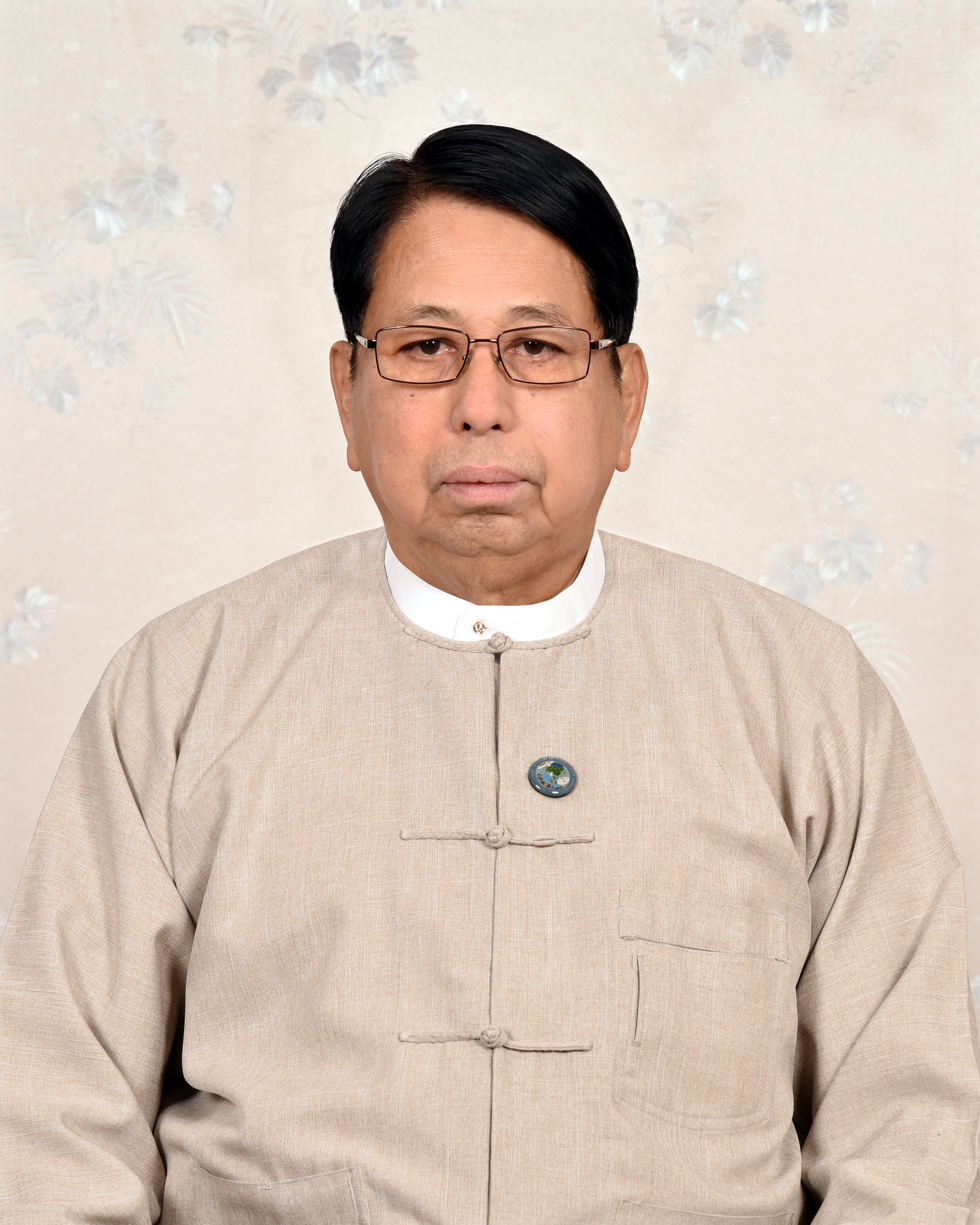
- Pe Myint in 2014

Minister for Information of Myanmar
- In office 30 March 2016 – 1 February 2021
- President: Htin Kyaw; Myint Swe (acting); Win Myint
- Preceded by: Ye Htut
- Succeeded by: Chit Naing

Personal details
- Born: 15 December 1949 (age 76) Thandwe, Burma (Myanmar)
- Education: University of Medicine 1, Yangon
- Occupation: Politician; writer; physician

Pe Myint (Burmese: ဖေမြင့် [pʰè mjɪ̰ɴ]; born 15 December 1949) is a Burmese politician, writer and a former Minister for Information of Myanmar (Burma).

== Early life and education ==
Pe Myint was born on 15 December 1949 in Sandoway, Burma (now Thandwe, Myanmar) to Aung Nyein and Khin Thein. He is of Rakhine descent.

== Career ==
Pe Myint graduated from Thandwe State High School in Rakhine State in 1966 and Institute of Medicine 1, Rangoon in 1975. He worked as a physician until 1988. He received training as a journalist at the Indochina Media Memorial Foundation in Bangkok.

He previously served as the vice chairperson of the Myanmar Press Council, editor-in-chief of The People's Age Journal, editor of Sarpaylawka Book House and Myanmar Book Publishing House.

On 22 March 2016, he was nominated to be Minister for Information in President Htin Kyaw's Cabinet. On 24 March, the Assembly of the Union confirmed his nomination. Following the military-led 2021 Myanmar coup d'état, the Myanmar Armed Forces appointed Chit Hlaing as Pe Myint's successor on 1 February 2021.

== Literary works ==
Pe Myint is a well-known writer and won Myanmar National Literature Award in 1995. He has published over forty books of fiction, non-fiction, and translated works.

Some of his original and translated works include

- 1975 — The Hospital (original by Arthur Hailey, The Final Diagnosis)
- 1977 — Ward No. 6 (original by Anton Chekhov, Ward No. 6)
- 1988 — First Love (original by Ivan Turgenev, First Love)
- 1993 — On Death and Other Short Stories
- 1993 — Normal Mind and Normal Behaviour (A Collection of Articles on Applied Psychology)
- 1995 — Parts for Sale and Other Short Stories (won Myanmar National Literature Award)
- 1997 — The Richest Man in Babylon (original by George Samuel Clason, The Richest Man in Babylon)

== Personal life ==
He is married to Khaing Nwe Oo, a book publisher, and has two children, Pe Zaw Oo and Cho Su Su Khaing.
