= Tin Tun Oo =

Burmese entrepreneur

Tin Tun Oo Burmese: တင်ထွန်းဦး
- Occupation: Publisher
- Known for: The Myanmar Times
- Spouse: Yamin Htin

Tin Tun Oo (Burmese: တင်ထွန်းဦး) is a Burmese media entrepreneur who owns Swesone Media Company, with about 60 employees. The group publishes the Thuta Swesone magazine, Pyi Myanmar journal, Arrawjan magazine and Good Health journal. He is sponsor of the annual Thuta Swesone literary award.

The Myanmar Times began publishing in 2000. Ross Dunkley had 49% of the company and Sonny Swe, an associate of General Khin Nyunt owned 40%. General Khin Nyunt was arrested and Sonny Swe was also temporarily detained in November 2004. Sonny Swe's stake in The Myanmar Times was transferred to his wife, Yamin Htin Aung, who continued to hold the local share with another investor, Pyone Maung Maung, for almost a year. In 2015, she was forced by the Ministry of Information to sell her stake to Tin Tun Oo.

Tin Tun Oo was vice-chairman of the Myanmar Writers and Journalists Association (MWJA). Under the MWJA constitution, as an independent association no members could belong to a political party. In August 2010 Tin Tun Oo and other senior members of the executive resigned so that they could compete in the national elections. Tin Tun Oo ran unsuccessfully for the Pazundaung Township constituency on the Union Solidarity and Development Party (USDP) ticket.

In February 2011 Tin Tun Oo became CEO of The Myanmar Times, replacing editor Ross Dunkley, who had been arrested and imprisoned for violating the Myanmar Immigration Act. He was also named editor-in-chief of the Myanmar-language edition, while Bill Clough of Far Eastern Consolidated Media became editor-in-chief of the English-language edition.
