= Aung Thu (minister) =

Burmese politician

His Excellency Aung Thu
- အောင်သူ
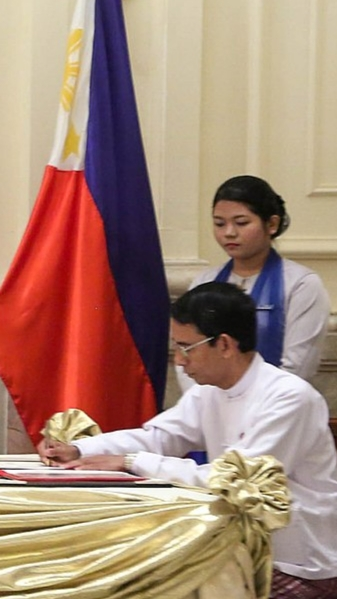

Minister for Agriculture, Livestock and Irrigation
- In office 30 March 2016 – 1 February 2021
- President: Htin Kyaw; Win Myint
- Deputy: Tun Win
- Preceded by: Myint Hlaing (Agriculture and Irrigation); Ohn Myint (Livestock and Fisheries)

Amyotha Hluttaw MP
- In office 1 February 2016 – 30 March 2016
- Constituency: Yangon Region № 6

Rector of Yangon University
- In office 2014–2015
- Succeeded by: Phoe Kaung

Rector of Taungoo University
- In office 2008–2014

Personal details
- Born: July 8, 1955 (age 71) Yesagyo, Burma (Myanmar)
- Party: National League for Democracy
- Spouse: Khin Thida
- Children: Thiri Thinza Aung
- Education: Yangon University

Aung Thu (Burmese: အောင်သူ [àʊɴ θù]; born 8 July 1955) is a Burmese politician who was Minister for Agriculture, Livestock and Irrigation of Myanmar (Burma) from 2018 to 2021.

== Early life and education ==
Aung Thu was born on 8 July 1955 to Ba Thaung, a goldsmith, and Khin Lay, in Yesagyo, Burma (now Myanmar). He holds a doctorate degree in mathematics. Aung Thu is married to Khin Thida, and has one daughter, Thiri Thinza Aung.

== Career ==
On 22 March 2016, Aung Thu was nominated as Minister for Agriculture, Livestock and Irrigation in President Htin Kyaw's Cabinet. On 24 March, the Assembly of the Union confirmed his nomination. On 1 February, during the 2021 Myanmar coup d'état, Aung Thu was placed under house arrest by the Myanmar Armed Forces.

He previously served as Amyotha Hluttaw MP for Yangon Region № 6 constituency.
