= The Myanmar Times =

English language newspaper in Burma

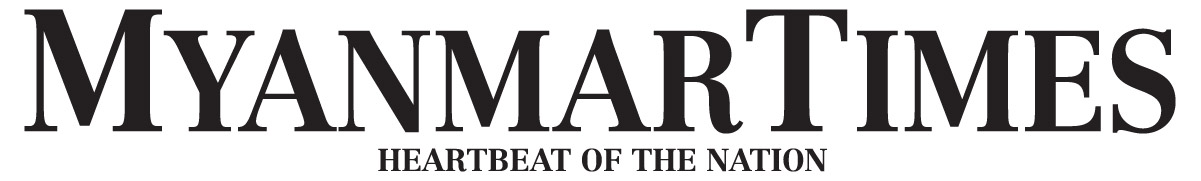

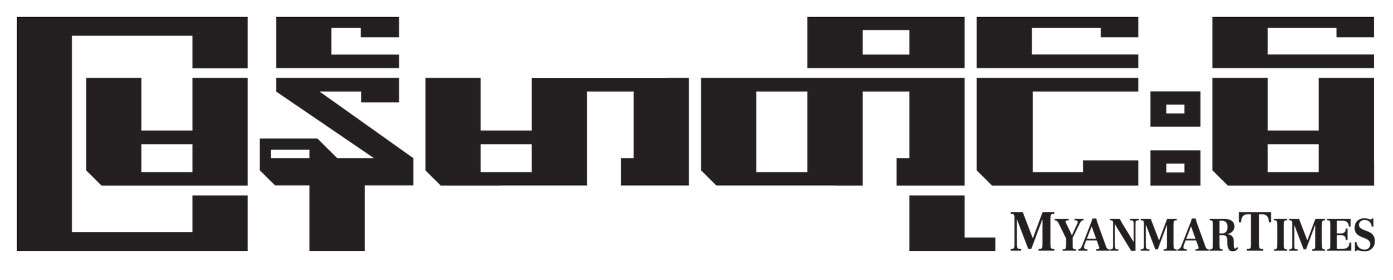
- Type: Daily newspaper
- Format: Berliner
- Owner: Myanmar Consolidated Media Co. Ltd. (MCM)
- Founders: Ross Dunkley; Sonny Swe
- Publisher: Thein Tun
- Editor-in-chief: Wan Ken Chern (editorial masthead)
- Founded: 2000; 26 years ago
- Language: English, Burmese
- Headquarters: No. 379/383, Bo Aung Kyaw Street, Kyauktada Township, Yangon, Myanmar
- Sister newspapers: The Bangkok Post, The Phnom Penh Post
- Website: mmtimes.com

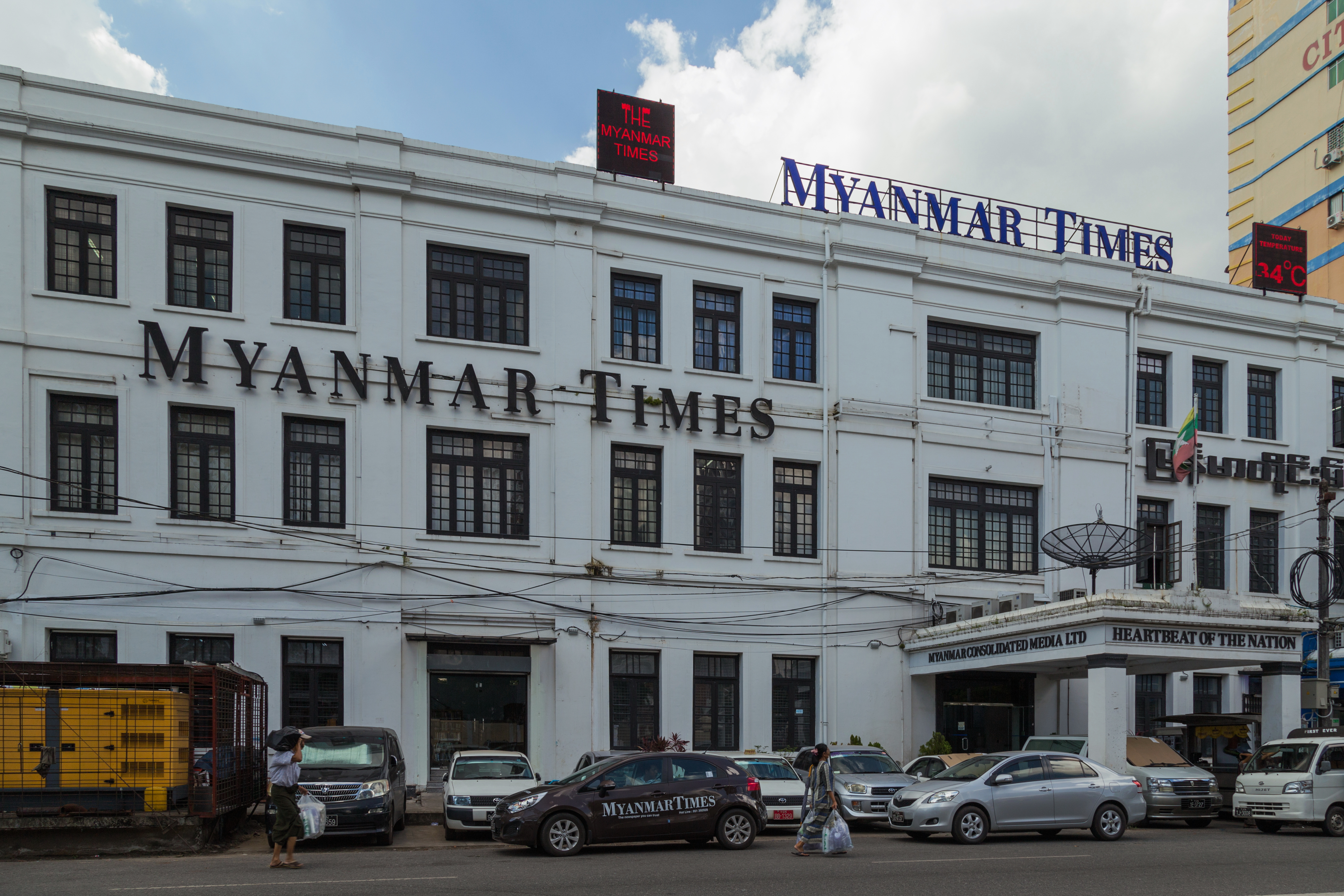
Headquarters of "The Myanmar Times" in Yangon

The Myanmar Times (Burmese: မြန်မာတိုင်း(မ်), MLCTS: mran ma: tuing: [mjànmá táɪn]), founded in 2000, is the oldest privately owned and operated English-language newspaper in Myanmar. A division of Myanmar Consolidated Media Co., Ltd. (MCM), The Myanmar Times published weekly English and Burmese-language news journals until March 2015, when the English edition began publishing daily, five days per week. Its head offices are in Yangon, with additional offices in Mandalay and Nay Pyi Taw. As per an announcement at the official website of the newspaper, it stopped nine media services on 21 February 2021 (20 days after the 2021 Myanmar coup d'état) primarily for three months. However, its services have remained suspended since then.

== History ==
=== Early years ===
The Myanmar Times was founded by Ross Dunkley, an Australian, and Sonny Swe (Myat Swe) of Myanmar in 2000, making it the only Burmese newspaper to have foreign investment at the time. The newspaper is privately owned by Myanmar Consolidated Media Co. Ltd. (MCM), which is 51 per cent locally owned and 49 per cent foreign owned. In the past, The Myanmar Times had often been perceived as being close to the government in part because Sonny Swe's father, Brigadier General Thein Swe, was a senior member of the now-disbanded Military Intelligence department.

When it was first established, The Myanmar Times was the only publication in the country to be censored by Military Intelligence, rather than the Press Scrutiny Board. This created some resentment locally, among both the Ministry of Information and other journals. Internationally, the paper had been derided as "sophisticated propaganda" and a public relations tool for more progressive elements in the government, such as General Khin Nyunt, Myanmar's former Prime Minister. It was also forced to print government propaganda, albeit under a "State Opinion" banner.

=== Arrest of Sonny Swe ===
Sonny Swe was arrested on 26 November 2004. In April 2005 he was given a 14-year jail sentence for publishing the papers without approval from the Ministry of Information's Press Scrutiny Board. The charges were imposed retroactively after Military Intelligence was declared an illegal organisation, which in turn meant The Myanmar Times had been effectively publishing uncensored material since its launch. He was released from Taunggyi Prison in Shan State on 23 April 2013 after serving more than eight years of a 14-year sentence.

Swe's arrest and sentencing were generally considered political and linked to his father's senior position in Military Intelligence, a government body that was purged in 2004 after a power struggle within the military. Following Sonny Swe's arrest, his stake in The Myanmar Times was transferred to his wife, Yamin Htin Aung, who continued to hold the local share with another investor, Pyone Maung Maung, for almost a year.

However, she was forced by the Ministry of Information to sell her stake to another local media entrepreneur, Tin Tun Oo, whose company, Thuta Swe Sone, publishes four other journals. Tin Tun Oo was the secretary of the Myanmar Writers and Journalists' Association and was believed at the time to have a close relationship with the Ministry of Information. When Myanmar Consolidated Media's shareholders initially refused to comply with the ministry, rumours circulated that the paper would be shut down. Australia's Foreign Minister Alexander Downer reportedly flew to Yangon to intervene, although his office denied this.

At the time, the newspaper was still widely regarded as semi-official or government-influenced, it being run by a private company. When, on 17 January 2011, the state-owned paper The Mirror implied that Tin Tun Oo had taken over as editor-in-chief of MCM, fueling rumours of a power struggle between Ross Dunkley and Tin Tun Oo, it received a formal complaint from the media group. Following Sonny Swe's imprisonment in 2005, another Burmese media entrepreneur, Tin Tun Oo, acquired the locally owned share of MCM in controversial circumstances.

=== Post-censorship and daily launch ===
The reformist Thein Sein government abolished pre-publication censorship in August 2012. Until then, all media in Myanmar including The Myanmar Times was heavily censored by the Ministry of Information's Press Scrutiny and Registration Division, commonly known as the Press Scrutiny Board. According to Dunkley, on average, 20 per cent of the articles submitted to the censorship board were rejected, and the gaps filled were with soft news stories.

After a prolonged power struggle between Australian editor-in-chief Ross Dunkley and Tin Tun Oo, prominent businessman U Thein Tun bought the shares of Tin Tun Oo for an undisclosed sum in February 2013.

The English language edition moved to a daily publishing cycle in March 2015. Dunkley sold his interest in the paper and transferred his responsibilities as CEO to Tony Child on 1 October of that year. In April 2016, Child was succeeded by Malaysian journalist Bill Tegjeu as CEO and Editorial Director.

Since 2007, MCM has also published NOW!, a Burmese-language health, beauty and fashion weekly magazine.

=== Sister publications ===
In late 2007 investors in Myanmar Consolidated Media took a controlling interest in well-regarded English-language newspaper The Phnom Penh Post, based in Cambodia. The investors were identified as Ross Dunkley and Bill Clough, an Australian mining and oil and gas entrepreneur. Six months after the takeover, The Phnom Penh Post, which was established in 1991, began daily publication, including an article republication agreement with The Myanmar Times. Dunkley ceased his association with The Phnom Penh Post in 2013. The Myanmar Times also engages in a content-sharing association with The Bangkok Post, an English-language daily newspaper published in Bangkok, Thailand.

== Controversies ==
=== Killer Than Shwe advertisement ===
In July 2007, a Danish group named Surrend placed an advertisement in The Myanmar Times' English edition that contained the concealed messages "freedom" and "killer Than Shwe", a reference to Burma's head of state. The bogus advertisement appeared to be a call for tourists from Scandinavia and contained the word Ewhsnahtrellik, or "killer Than Shwe" in reverse, as well as a supposed "old Danish poem", the acrostic of which read "freedom". The group said it placed the ad to "show that you can find cracks or holes in even the worst regimes". The controversy made that week's edition a "best-seller" and copies were sold for double their face value by local newspaper vendors.

While no serious action was taken against The Myanmar Times for publishing the advertisement, two staff at the Press Scrutiny Board were removed from their positions and copies of the newspaper were pulled from the shelves. The stunt was widely criticised by those in the local media industry but Surrend founder Jan Egesborg defended the group's prank, saying "we are very sorry for the people ... but if [the authorities] do something like that it says something about the regime".

=== Banned for one week ===
In January 2008, The Myanmar Times' Myanmar-language edition was banned from publishing for one week. The ban was imposed by the Press Scrutiny Board after the newspaper's editors published a story on 11 January about satellite licence fees, despite being warned not to do so. The ban was subsequently condemned by Reporters Without Borders and the Burma Media Association.

In the following week's English edition, CEO Ross Dunkley defended the article as "good journalism" and denied that he had been told to sack four editors. However, he did announce an editorial "reshuffle" and the creation of an Editorial Steering Committee to both "safeguard the company from conflict with the authorities" and "plan improvements and expansion".

=== Arrest of Ross Dunkley ===
On 10 February 2011, Ross Dunkley, the founder and editor-in-chief of the weekly, was arrested and charged with breaching immigration law by assaulting a sex worker. On 13 February 2011, after Dunkley's arrest, Tin Tun Oo of Swesone Media and Bill Clough of Far Eastern Consolidated Media (FECM) were appointed as editors-in-chief of the Burmese and English language editions.

Dunkley was released on bail on 29 March from Insein Prison after posting bail and was convicted on 30 June 2011, of assaulting the woman and breaching immigration laws and fined 100,000 kyats (around US$100 at the time).

=== Firing of Journalists and 2021 Myanmar coup d'état ===
The managers of The Myanmar Times have fired 13 journalists, including the editor-in-chief, from the Burmese language daily edition without any prior warning in 2019. Following the 2021 Myanmar coup d'état, The Myanmar Times has suspended their all publication since February.

== See also ==
- List of newspapers in Myanmar
- Mass media in Myanmar
