= Hannayuri =

Burmese makeup artist and model

- ဟန်နာယူရီ
- Born: Yupar Htun Tin; 17 November 1993 (age 32); Taunggyi, Myanmar
- Citizenship: Burmese
- Occupations: Model, make-up artist, beauty influencer
- Years active: 2015–present

Hannayuri (Burmese: ဟန်နာယူရီ; born Yupar Htun Tin (Burmese: ရူပါထွန်းတင်) on 17 November 1993) is a Burmese model, make-up artist, and beauty influencer. During the 2021 Myanmar coup d'état, she became one of the most prominent anti-regime activists. Because of her involvement in anti-coup protests, an arrest warrant was issued for her, and she fled to South Korea.

== Career ==
Hannayuri learned special make-up techniques in Thailand. During her study in Thailand, she modelled for two types of Thai cosmetics, and she signed a contract with a Thai cosmetic brand. When she returned to Myanmar, she offered to work as a make-up artist for the popular film Winyin Sein in 2015. She founded the Magic 4 Makeup Studio in July 2015. She then appeared in music videos and gained popularity after acting in Bunny Phyoe's MTV "Anniversary" and "4 am". She has been presenting and acting in the travel documentary program of Myanmar Celebrity Media. She worked as one of the Myanmar agents on a Thailand-made cosmetic called "Forever Young" in 2015, while also applying to be an official distributor. Her business faced many problems and widely criticized by customers.

Hannayuri has appeared as a walkway model in several fashion shows in Myanmar since 2017. In 2018, she offered to work for the film Once Upon A Time. She was a key opinion leader of Fujifilm Myanmar and brand ambassador of Dermaster. She has appeared in over 20 TV commercial advertisements to date.

The Global Influencer Network (GIN) announced that Hannayuri was selected as the Influencer of the month for June 2021. She was also selected as the influencer of the month for October.

On 1 December 2022, she received the K Culture Innovation Award at the 2019 Korea Innovation Celebrity Awards Ceremony.

== Political activities ==
Following the 2021 Myanmar coup d'état, Hannayuri participated in the anti-coup movement both in person at rallies and through social media channels with 1.3 million followers. She joined the "We Want Justice" three-finger salute movement. The movement, launched on social media, has been joined by many celebrities. As a result, Hannayuri was blacklisted by the military junta for inciting unrest against the state and threatening "public tranquillity" through social media posts. As a target of the military junta, she fled to Thailand afterwards, and was able to fly to South Korea via Bangkok.

Hannayuri led campaigns in South Korea, securing donations, and gathering signatures to petition for the release of all political prisoners to free Myanmar from the military junta. She appeared in several South Korean news programs to speak out about the situation in Myanmar. Hannayuri said that after the military came to power, demonstrators were suppressed aggressively. In addition to torturing arrested persons and sexually assaulting women, they also cut off the Internet to prevent news from spreading abroad.

Hannayuri donated 100,000 won for Mindat clashes.

In the first week of July, Hanayuri made a free "Green Tea Drink" commercial in South Korea to donate to Myanmar.

== Personal life ==
Hannayuri was in a relationship with singer Bunny Phyoe for seven years. In 2016, singer Bunny Phyoe revealed in an interview that he and Hannayuri had ended their seven-year relationship. She parted ways with her boyfriend during a challenging period in her life.
