= Tun Tun Oo (politician) =

Burmese politician

Member of the Amyotha Hluttaw
- Incumbent
- Assumed office 3 February 2016
- Constituency: Mandalay Region № 2
- Majority: 344315 votes

Personal details
- Born: 22 January 1961 (age 65) Mandalay, Myanmar
- Party: National League for Democracy
- Parent: Thar Hla (father)
- Education: Rangoon Institute of Technology (RIT)

Tun Tun Oo (Burmese: ထွန်းထွန်းဦး, also spelled Htun Htun Oo; born 22 January 1961) is a Burmese politician currently serves as Amyotha Hluttaw MP for Mandalay Region № 2 Constituency.

== Early life and education ==
Tun was born on 22 January 1961 in Mandalay, Myanmar. He graduated with a BEng (Electrical Power) from Rangoon Institute of Technology (RIT). His previous job was as a consultant engineer.

== Political career ==
He is a member of the National League for Democracy Party politician, he was elected as an Amyotha Hluttaw MP, winning a majority of 344315 votes and elected representative for Mandalay Region № 2 parliamentary constituency.
