= Kyaw Sein =

Burmese politician

- ကျော်စိန်

Minister of Education
- In office June 1988 – September 1988
- President: Ne Win

Personal details
- Born: 12 August 1932
- Died: 2 January 2013 (aged 80–81)
- Spouse: Tin Tin Aye
- Children: 3
- Parent(s): Sein Khaing (father); Thet Su (mother)
- Education: University of Yangon; Columbia University
- Occupation: Politician, Writer
- Awards: National Lifetime Award for Literary Achievement (2011); Pakokku U Ohn Pe Lifetime Award for Literary Achievement

Kyaw Sein (21 August 1932 – 2 January 2013; Burmese: ကျော်ဆွေ) was a Burmese writer, former professor of psychology, and former Education minister of Myanmar.

He was the last minister of education in the Burma Socialist Programme Party's government.

== Early life and education ==
Kyaw Sein was born on 21 August 1932, in Bago, Myanmar. In 1950, he passed the university entrance exam at Government High School in Bago and received the Collegiate Scholarship.

He received a Bachelor's degree from Yangon University in 1954 and a Master's degree in psychology in 1958. In 1966, he received his Ph.D. from Columbia University in New York, USA.

He served as lecturer at the Department of Psychology, Yangon University in 1954, as Assistant Lecturer in 1957, as Lecturer in 1967 and Professor in 1977. He also served as the Rector of Yangon University in 1983 and as the Rector of Mandalay University 1985.

== Political career ==
Under the Government of Prime Minister Ne Win, he was appointed Minister of Education in early 1988, the last time the Burma Socialist Programme Party's government was in power. But the minister's term lasted only three months.

In the 1990 Myanmar general election, he was elected from the Thingangyun constituency in Rangoon Division on behalf of the National Unity Party (NUP) and lost.

== Published books ==
- Youth Guide (Burmese: လူငယ်လမ်းညွှန်) 1992
- Applied psychology for your life(Burmese: သင့်ဘဝအတွက် အသုံးချ စိတ်ပညာ) 1976
- Modern Psychology (University Book Publishing Committee for the Second Year) (Burmese: ခေတ်သစ် စိတ်ပညာ ) 1969

== Death ==
At the age of 81, he died on 2 January 2013, in Yangon.
