= Htun Htun Oo (chief justice) =

Chief Justice of Myanmar (2011–present)

The Honourable Htun Htun Oo
- ထွန်းထွန်းဦး

Chief Justice of Myanmar
- Incumbent
- Assumed office 30 March 2011
- Appointed by: Thein Sein
- Preceded by: Aung Toe

Deputy Chief Justice of Myanmar
- In office 2007–2011

Personal details
- Born: 28 July 1956 (age 69) Burma
- Spouse: Aye Aye Thein
- Education: B.A. (Law), LL.B (1979) (Rangoon University)
- Occupation: Lawyer

Military service
- Allegiance: Myanmar
- Branch/service: Myanmar Army
- Commands: Southwest Command (1981-1989); Major, Military Advocate General Office (1990-1994)

Htun Htun Oo (Burmese: ထွန်းထွန်းဦး; also spelt Tun Tun Oo; born 28 July 1956) is the Chief Justice of the Supreme Court of Myanmar (Burma). He was nominated by President Thein Sein to the post in February 2011. He previously served as captain in the Southwestern Regional Command of the Myanmar Army from 1981 to 1989, and held the posts of Military Advocate General (1990-1994) and Deputy Chief Justice (2007-2011).

== Personal Sanctions ==
On 31 January 2022, the U.S. Department of the Treasury added Htun Tun Oo to its Specially Designated Nationals (SDN) list.

On 8 November 2022, the European Council adopted a decision placing restrictive measures against a number of junta-appointed officials who actively participate in efforts to legitimize the junta and actively undermine democracy and stability in Myanmar, including Htun Htun Oo. It was stated that he as the junta-backed Chief Justice has participated in number of unfair trials against pro-democracy activists and opposition actors using the full power of justice system to commit acts of oppression.
