= Ohn Pe =

Burmese businessman and writer

Pakokku U Ohn Pe
- ပခုက္ကူ ဦးအုန်းဖေ
- Born: 1917; Shadaw village, British Burma
- Died: 2008 (aged 90–91); Pakokku, Magwe Division, Myanmar
- Occupations: Writer, Businessman

Pakokku U Ohn Pe (Burmese: ပခုက္ကူ ဦးအုန်းဖေ; c. 1917 – 13 April 2008) was a Burmese businessman and writer who founded the prestigious Pakokku U Ohn Pe literary award.

== Early years ==
U Ohn Pe was born around 1917 in Shardaw village near the town of Pakokku. He was the eldest of five siblings in a poor family. He only studied for a short time at a village monastery when he was about ten years old, learning basic reading and writing. He worked in various jobs including day labourer, betel nut seller, farm worker and timber worker. At the age of 29 he was arrested and thrown in prison for robbery. While he was in prison a sympathetic warden named U Maung Maung Tin helped U Ohn Pe develop an interest in reading.

== Businessman, philanthropist, writer ==
After being released, U Ohn Pe started to deal in tobacco, and in 1956 was able to start his own tobacco manufacturing company and factory. As a successful businessman, he remained interested in literature. In 1992 he donated K7.6 million to set up the annual Pakokku U Ohn Pe Literary Award. The award is conferred annually for literary works considered the best in various genres. Later he founded the Pakokku U Ohn Pe Library in Pakokku. He also founded the Pakokku Outstanding Students Award, Pakokku Pharmaceutical Fund, Pakokku Fund for Fire and Pakokku Scholarship for the Poor.

U Ohn Pe visited China in 1996 with a delegation of Myanmar writers. In 2000 he published the first volume of his autobiography, with the second volume appearing in 2001 and the last in 2004. In November 2002 he won the Sayawun Tin Shwe Award for his Twaeya-kyonya-kyundaw-bawa (My experiences). He also published a collection of articles in 2004. He died on 13 April 2008 at Pakokku Hospital in Magwe Division aged 92. U Ohn Pe has been called the best known writer in Myanmar.
