= Ohn Myint =

Burmese journalist

Thakin Ohn Myint
- သခင် အုန်းမြင့်
- Born: 21 April 1918; Letpadan, Pegu Division, British Burma
- Died: 17 September 2010 (aged 92); Yankin Township, Yangon, Myanmar
- Resting place: Yayway Cemetery, Yangon
- Occupation: Journalist
- Children: Four

Thakin Ohn Myint (Burmese: သခင် အုန်းမြင့်) was a notable Burmese journalist, best known for his political involvement in British Burma. In 1933, he joined the Dobama Asiayone, an indigenous anti-colonial organization where he earned the honorific "Thakin," (lit. "master"), which was used in protest of British colonialism (since it was customary practice to address the British as "Thakin"). After passing the matriculation exam in 1934, he went on to the Rangoon Medical College (now UM-1 Yangon). However, he dropped out and pursued journalism instead.

Throughout his journalism career, he wrote for the Kyipwayay ("Growth") magazine, and the Totetyay ("Progress"), the Journal Kyaw (along with Chit Maung), and the New Light of Burma newspapers. In 1958, soon after Ne Win first declared emergency martial law, he was imprisoned in the Coco Islands for two years, under the Public Order Protection Act, for his leftist political activism. In the mid-1960s, he was detained again in Insein Prison.

Ohn Myint is widely considered to have influenced Aung San Suu Kyi, and the two had a close friendship.

In 1989, he was arrested for another 5 years and once again in 1998 for allowing himself to be interviewed by researcher Aung Htun, who was writing a book on the history of Burma's student movement. Although he was sentenced to 7 years of hard labor, his sentence was commuted the following year, after the visit of American congressman Tony P. Hall.

He was cremated at the Yayway Cemetery in Yangon.
