= Aung Kyi =

Burmese politician and general

His Excellency Aung Kyi
- အောင်ကြည်
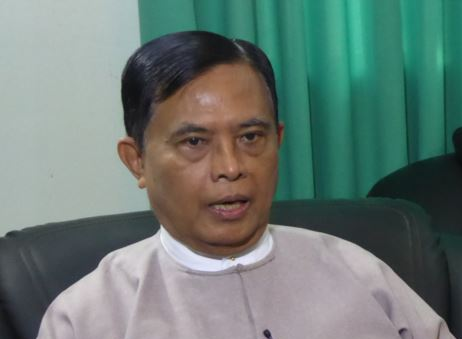
- Aung Kyi in 2017

Chairman of Anti-Corruption Commission of Myanmar
- In office 24 November 2017 – 1 December 2020
- Preceded by: Mya Win
- Succeeded by: Tin Oo

Minister of Information of Myanmar
- In office 27 August 2012 – 29 July 2014
- Preceded by: Kyaw Hsan
- Succeeded by: Ye Htut

Minister of Labour of Myanmar
- In office 24 October 2007 – 27 August 2012
- Preceded by: Tin Aye
- Succeeded by: Maung Myint

Ministry of Social Welfare, Relief and Resettlement of Myanmar
- In office 30 March 2011 – 27 August 2012
- Succeeded by: Myat Myat Ohn Khin

MP of the Pyithu Hluttaw
- In office 31 January 2011 – 30 March 2011
- Preceded by: Constituency established
- Succeeded by: Phyu Phyu Thin
- Constituency: Mingala Taungnyunt Township
- Majority: 28,566 (47%)

Deputy Minister of Labour of Myanmar
- In office November 2006 – 24 October 2007

Personal details
- Born: 1 November 1946 (age 79) Yangon, Burma
- Party: Union Solidarity and Development Party
- Spouse: Thet Thet Swe
- Education: Officers Training School, Bahtoo
- Awards: Gallantry Medal (Thu-ye-gaung-hmat-tan-win tazeit)

Military service
- Allegiance: Myanmar
- Branch/service: Myanmar Army
- Rank: Major General

Aung Kyi (Burmese: အောင်ကြည်; born 1 November 1946) is a Burmese politician and veteran who served as chairman of Anti-Corruption Commission of Myanmar. He previously served as the Minister of Information, Minister of Labor, Minister of Social Welfare, Relief and Resettlement in the Cabinet of Burma. He was appointed as the Minister of Labor on 24 October 2007 by the then ruling State Peace and Development Council. In October 2007, he received an additional concurrent appointment as minister for relations to detained National League for Democracy leader Aung San Suu Kyi.

== Military career ==
He graduated from the 40th intake of the Officers Training School, Bahtoo. He retired from his post as a major general of Myanmar Armed Forces.

== In office as minister ==
After leaving full-time military service, he was named deputy minister for labor in November 2006, and in that capacity has been in charge of relations with the International Labour Organization. In February 2007, he brokered a deal with the ILO to establish a new system of reporting of complaints of forced labor. He was appointed Minister for Labour in October 2007.

Aung Kyi has a reputation for relative accessibility, compared to the predominantly secretive leaders of the junta. Aung Kyi's appointment as the junta's official liaison to Aung San Suu Kyi in October 2007 followed worldwide condemnation of the junta after its violent crackdown on the 2007 Burmese anti-government protests. The junta then sought to reopen talks with Suu Kyi, the detained leader of the National League for Democracy. The creation of the Cabinet-level position of liaison minister, to "smooth relations with Daw Aung San Suu Kyi", had been suggested to the State Peace and Development Council by United Nations envoy Ibrahim Gambari, who had been working on a diplomatic solution to the political crisis in Myanmar. Aung Kyi's appointment as minister of relations was concurrent with his duties as minister of labour.
