= Ministry of Livestock, Fisheries and Rural Development =

- မွေးမြူရေး၊ ရေလုပ်ငန်းနှင့် ကျေးလက်ဒေသဖွံ့ဖြိုးရေးဝန်ကြီးဌာန
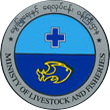
- Seal of the Ministry of Livestock, Fisheries and Rural Development

Agency overview
- Jurisdiction: Government of Myanmar
- Headquarters: Office No. 36, Naypyidaw; 19.783009°N 96.141763°E
- Minister responsible: Ohn Myint
- Deputy Ministers responsible: Khin Maung Aye; Aung Myat Oo, Dr; Tin Ngwe
- Website: www.mlfrd.gov.mm

The Ministry of Livestock, Fisheries and Rural Development (Burmese: မွေးမြူရေး၊ ရေလုပ်ငန်းနှင့် ကျေးလက်ဒေသဖွံ့ဖြိုးရေးဝန်ကြီးဌာန) was a ministry in the Burmese government responsible for the country's livestock and fishery sectors.

The development of livestock and fisheries sectors of the Republic of the Union of Myanmar was undertaken by the Ministry of Agriculture and Forestry up to the fiscal year of 1982–1983. In accordance with the decision of 3/6 cabinet meeting of the Council of State held on 10 February 1983, the Ministry of the Livestock and Fisheries was particularly organised on 15 March 1983. With Order No. (67/2013) dated 9 August 2013 of the Myanmar President's Office, and in accord with the agreement of the Seventh Regular Session of First Pyidaungsu Hluttaw, Ministry of Livestock and Fisheries was renamed Ministry of Livestock, Fisheries and Rural Development.

== Departmental bodies ==
- Directorate of Livestock, Fisheries and Rural Development
- Livestock Breeding and Veterinary Department
- Department of Fisheries
- Department of Rural Development
- University of Veterinary Science, Yezin

== Objectives ==
- To sufficient the domestic consumption and export the extra enough.
- To control the infectious disease and zoonosis disease by co-operation with international organisations, UN agencies and concerned departments
- To produce the quality and safety of livestock products
- To achieve the average livestock improvement rate of 8.43% per year
- To invite foreign investment in line with state policy
- To increase per capita consumption of fish
- To meet with ASEAN Economic Community Blue Print in fishery priority integration sector.

== Policies ==
- Expansion of livestock business enterprise mainly based on dairy and beef cattle
- Extension of the disease free zone for the purpose of livestock development
- Enlargement of the breeding of horse, donkey and mule for the use of transportation needed for vaccination campaigns, research projects and some remote areas where other means of transport are merely possible
- Production of internationally marketable inland and marine fish and shrimp species concordant with respective regions and climate in accordance with good breeding methods
- Increase production of value added fishery products in line with international standards
- Conservation of fisheries resources for sustainable fisheries in accordance with international guidelines
- To produce the livestock and fisheries products for food security by capture and culture system without compromising the ecosystem and to conduct the production of quality and safety livestock and fisheries products in line with international standard.
- To improve 3 times of the gross domestic product from the based year in livestock and fisheries sector.
