= Myanmar Writers and Journalists Association =

- Formation: November 1993; 33 years ago
- Type: Professional association
- Purpose: Promote literature in Myanmar
- Headquarters: Yangon
- Region served: Myanmar
- Website: mwja.org/mmsite/

The Myanmar Writers and Journalists Association (Burmese: မြန်မာစာပေနှင့် စာနယ်ဇင်းအဖွဲ့; MWJA) represents writers and journalists in Myanmar. At first closely associated with the Ministry of Information, in the 2011-2012 period the MWJA achieved greater independence.

== Early years ==
Myanmar writers formed an association on 8 March 1944, during British colonial rule. In November 1993 the Myanmar Writers Association was reconstituted as the Myanmar Writers and Journalists Association. The Burmese writers established the MWJA with permission from the Ministry of Information. The MWJA is a nationwide confederation with a central headquarters and associations or branches throughout the country. The MWJA was started with a 25-member executive committee. It held its second conference in June 1997.

In its conference on 23 June 1998, the MWJA decided on three tasks. "The three tasks are: the association members are to actively participate in serving national interests by having ... the people imbued with correct concepts and high morale with the use of literature and journalism: to the extent organisation for new members consolidate organisational set-up of the association, raise leadership role and make organisation work dynamic and effective; to bring about improvement of skills of MWJA members, look after their welfare and regularize creation and publishing of literary works, and to strive for increasing the readership".

The MWJA sponsors the annual Sayawun Tin Shwe Award named after the writer Sayawun Tin Shwe. It organises an annual book fair on Writers' (Sarsodaw) Day. On this day the MWJA also organises lectures, talks and traditional gatherings of writers. At these gatherings junior writers show their respect for their seniors and make offerings in cash or kind.

== Political changes ==
Under the MWJA constitution, as an independent association no members could belong to a political party. In August 2010 four senior members of the executive resigned so that they could compete in the national elections. They were chairman U Tin Kha, vice-chairman Dr Tin Tun Oo and Central Executive Committee members U Aung Nyein and U Hla Tun.

In 2010 the French media group Reporters Sans Frontieres ranked Burma 171 out of 175 nations for press freedom. The 2010 Myanmar Press Award ceremony was planned for 31 December 2010, organised by a group of journalists. It was postponed at the request of the Press Scrutiny and Registration Division (PSRD), who said it needed permission from the MWJA. On World Press Freedom Day in May 2011 the MWJA secretary Ko Ko said: "Flourishing of the fourth pillar [journalism] is a necessary feature of a democratic system and we believe that the government including President Thein Sein, if looking to bring about a democratic system, would understand this. We request [the government] to make this happen in practice". However, Ko Ko recognised that it would take time for government organisations to change their habitual hostility to the media.

With growing expectations of media liberalisation, some MWJA members acknowledged that after fifty years of weekly publication and censorship the change might be difficult. Some papers did not have the physical equipment needed to print daily issues. For journalists, the stress of producing responsible journalism under tight deadlines would be a new challenge. Media executives expressed confidence that they could quickly adapt. However, MWJA secretary U Ko Ko, chairman of Yangon Media Group, said "Every journal would say it was ready to go daily if granted a licence; but only those who are really ready will remain in the industry and the rest will stop".

== Regulatory liberalisation ==
In May 2011 U Ko Ko Hlaing, a retired colonel and vice-chairman of the MWJA, was appointed to a nine-member advisory board to the president U Thein Sein. Hlaing was one of three members of the political committee, the others being a former editor of the state-run newspaper Kyemon (“Mirror”) and the General Secretary of the Myanmar Hoteliers Association. In January 2012, the MWJA Vice-president Hlaing said the association expected to establish a national press council later in the year. The Union Minister of Information U Kyaw Hsan had approved this move in mid-December, which would be needed as the government's censorship organisation, the PSRD, gradually wound down. The purpose was to ensure that journalists would work within ethical and legal boundaries, while protecting their freedom of expression.

At the end of January 2012 the government introduced a new media law drafted by the PSRD to a meeting jointly organised by the MWJA and the Asia Media Information and Communication Centre based in Singapore. Over 100 domestic journalists and news editors participated. Representatives from non-Burmese news organisations also attended. The PSRD based the new law on the 1962 Printers and Publishers Registration Act, which had long been used to restrict freedom of expression. Conference attendees were invited to express their opinions on the draft law. The Burma Media Association later issued a press release saying the new law might not guarantee press freedom. The International Federation of Journalists has also expressed concern about the new law.
