= Kyaw Hsan =

- ကျော်ဆန်း
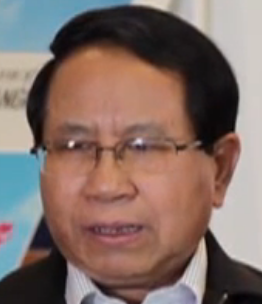
- Kyaw Hsan in 2011

Minister of Cooperatives of Myanmar
- In office 27 August 2012 – 30 March 2016
- Preceded by: Ohn Myint
- Succeeded by: position abolished

Minister of Culture of Myanmar
- In office 30 March 2011 – 27 August 2012
- Preceded by: Khin Aung Myint
- Succeeded by: Aye Myint Kyu

Minister of Information of Myanmar
- In office 13 September 2002 – 27 August 2012
- Preceded by: Kyi Aung
- Succeeded by: Aung Kyi

MP of the Pyithu Hluttaw
- In office 31 January 2011 – 30 March 2011
- Preceded by: Constituency established
- Succeeded by: Khin San Hlaing (NLD)
- Constituency: Pale Township
- Majority: 68,071 (94%)

Personal details
- Born: 20 May 1948 (age 78) Monywa, Burma
- Party: Union Solidarity and Development Party
- Spouse: Kyi Kyi Win
- Education: Defence Services Academy

Military service
- Allegiance: Myanmar
- Branch/service: Myanmar Army
- Rank: Brigadier-General

Kyaw Hsan (born 20 May 1948) is a former Brigadier-General and previously served as Minister of Cooperatives, Minister of Culture and Minister of Information of Myanmar.

== Early life and education ==
Kyaw Hsan was born on 20 May 1948 is Monywa, Sagaing Region. He attended high school in Pale. He applied to the Defense Services Academy (DSA) in 1964 but was rejected because he was too small. The next year he reapplied, this time successfully.

== Career ==
After graduating in 1969, Kyaw Hsan served as battalion commander and then division commander under Vice Senior-General Maung Aye, a regional commander in Shan State. In 2001 Kyaw Hsan was appointed deputy Minister of Commerce. In September 2002 he was appointed Minister of Information.

Kyaw Hsan had to resign from the military to run for office in 2010 on the ruling Union Solidarity and Development Party platform. He was elected an MP and became Minister of Information and Culture. A 2011 report in The Irrawaddy said he was one of the more powerful members of the government, and said he had used his control over the media to advance his career.
