= Ludu U Hla =

Burmese writer

- လူထုဦးလှ
- Portrait in the Ludu Library
- Born: 19 January 1910; Mandalay, British Burma
- Died: 7 August 1982 (aged 72); Mandalay, Burma
- Occupation: Writer
- Spouse: Ludu Daw Amar
- Children: Soe Win; Than Yin Mar; Po Than Gyaung; Tin Win; Nyein Chan

Ludu U Hla (Burmese: လူထုဦးလှ; pronounced [lùdṵ ʔú l̥a̰]; 19 January 1910 – 7 August 1982) was a Burmese journalist, publisher, chronicler, folklorist and social reformer whose prolific writings include a considerable number of path-breaking non-fiction works. He was married to fellow writer and journalist Ludu Daw Amar.

He collected oral histories from people in a diverse range of occupations which included a boatmaster on the Irrawaddy, a bamboo raftsman on the Salween, the keeper of a logging elephant, a broker for Steele Bros. (a large trading company during the colonial period), a gambler on horses, a bureaucrat and a reporter. These were published in a series of books titled "I the ------".

A library of 43 volumes of folk tales, a total of 1597 stories, that he collected between 1962 and 1977 from most of the ethnic minorities of Burma was a truly Herculean undertaking. Many of these have been translated into several languages. There are 5 other volumes of folktales from around the world to his credit.

During the U Nu era of parliamentary democracy, he spent over three years in Rangoon Central Jail as a political prisoner after publishing a controversial news story in his Mandalay newspaper Ludu (The People). Whilst in prison he interviewed several inmates and wrote their life stories as told in the first person narrative, the best known collection of which was published in The Caged Ones; it won the UNESCO award for literature in 1958, and has been translated into English.

== Kyipwayay U Hla ==
Born in Pazun Myaung village near Nyaunglebin in Lower Burma, and educated at the Rangoon Government High School, by the age of 20, U Hla had secured a valuer's position with the Rangoon Municipal Corporation; the Depression had hit Burma culminating in a peasant uprising and the founding of the nationalist Dobama Asiayone (We Burmans Association). He joined the Lungemya Kyipwayay Athin (Progress for Youth Club) which started as the Friendly Correspondence Club cum debating society among high school students in 1926, and his high-minded reformist zeal for all-round betterment of the country's youth had remained a lifelong passion since.

He lived over the shop in Scott's Market (renamed Bogyoke Market after independence) as a boarder, doubling as librarian, and taught night classes to children from poor families in the neighbourhood. A keen sportsman, he played football for the Municipal team, exercised regularly and remained a teetotaller all his life.

In 1932 he managed to take over the publication of the Kyipwayay (Progress/Growth) magazine after a false start by the chairman U Thein. He had wanted to be a writer and publisher and grabbed the opportunity. The magazine was a success with most of the day's famous writers on board and with an editorial remit of educating young people in self-improvement, health and moral discipline in the struggle for independence and for building a new united Burma. Regular columns such as Maha Swe's Nei Thu Yein's Fearless Doctrine and Theippan Maung Wa's Letter from Maung Than Gyaung attracted a large readership. The Kyipwayay became the vehicle for a new style and content in Burmese literature known as Hkit san (Testing the Age), a movement started most notably by Theippan Maung Wa, Nwe Soe, Zawgyi, Min Thu Wun, Maung Thuta, Maung Htin and Mya Kaytu. He also wrote articles assuming the pen names Kyipwayay Maung Hla and Maung Kan Kaung. A devout Buddhist and non-violent reformist at heart, he made friends with and his home became a favourite haunt of many politicians such as Aung San, Thakin Than Tun, Thakin Zin and Thakin Ba Koe as well as writers such as Maha Swe, Dagon Taya, Zawana, P Moe Nin, Thukha, Maung Htin and Dr Maung Hpyuu, journalists such as Thuriya U Thein Maung, cartoonists U Ba Galay, U Hein Soon and U Ba Gyan, artist U Ohn Lwin and weightlifters Ka-ya bala U Shein, U Zaw Weik and U Ne Win. The Thuriya (Sun) newspaper was where he had started as a budding writer and where he appeared to have learnt the rudiments of journalism and publishing. U Hla was tall, fair and handsome (Hla incidentally means handsome), and known for his friendly smile, gentle soft-spoken manner, even temper, clean living and generosity.

When the second university students strike in history broke out in 1936, he became friendly with one of the best known women student leaders, Amar from Mandalay, whose Burmese translation of Trials in Burma by Maurice Collis he had published among her other writings in his magazine. They married in 1939 and he moved to Mandalay where he continued to publish the Kyipwayay. He invited on board upcountry writers such as Shwe Kaingtha (a monk from Sagaing and former archaeologist who was already one of the Kyipwayay regulars under the name Yadanabon Hpo Hmatsu) and Marla, an old school friend of Amar, in addition to the usual stable of writers such as Maha Swe, Zawgyi, Min Thu Wun, Theippan Maung Wa, Zawana, Maung Hpyuu and Maung Htin.

== Wartime Kyipwayay ==
During the Japanese Occupation (1942–1945), the Kyipwayay continued to come out even though the whole extended family had fled the war to the countryside north of Mandalay. It featured as before cultural essays, literary reviews, and articles on travel, rural development and health education. U Hla and Daw Amar translated into Burmese and published all three best-selling wartime novels of the Japanese soldier writer Hino Ashihei:

1. Soil and Soldiers – Shun hnint sittha (ရွှံ့နှင့်စစ်သား) and
2. Flowers and Soldiers – Paan hnint sittha (ပန်းနှင့်စစ်သား) by U Hla
3. Wheat and Soldiers – Gyon hnint sittha (ဂျုံနှင့်စစ်သား) by Daw Amar who also translated "The Rainbow" (Thettant yaung) by the Polish Communist writer Wanda Wasilewska in 1945.

Both U Hla and Daw Amar became involved in the Resistance movement; they formed the Asha Lu Nge (Asia Youth) in Mandalay, ostensibly to collaborate with the Japanese, and engaged mainly in rescue and sanitation operations, but it became a ready source of young Resistance fighters for Bohmu Ba Htoo in Upper Burma. U Hla was aware that his young members were in contact with both the Communist Party and the People's Revolutionary Party (later the Socialist Party) and tried to protect them by advising the inclusion of an interpreter, who worked for the Japanese, on the executive committee of the organisation as a safeguard against the Kempeitai. When the Allies returned U Hla wasted no time in co-founding the Anti-Fascist People's Freedom League (AFPFL) in Mandalay with Rakhine U Kyaw Yin, who parachuted into Burma with the help of the Allies, and Thakin Tun Yin, while Rangoon was still under the Japanese. A popular wartime song titled Ludu sit (People's War) by A-1 Saya Hnya was co-written by U Hla and U Kyaw Yin. U Hla was arrested and interrogated by the British after they had recaptured Mandalay.

== Post-War Ludu ==
During the period of post-war austerity, U Hla continued to publish using any kind of paper that he could get hold of including coloured matchbox packing paper and used office paper with printing on one side. He would also still manage to send his new books as gifts, about 200 on each occasion, to all his friends in Rangoon at a time when communication lines and road and rail transportation had all but broken down. It was in 1945 that he launched the fortnightly Ludu (The People) Journal with his wife as assistant editor. The following year saw the launch of the Ludu Daily newspaper and subsequently the couple came to be known as Ludu U Hla and Ludu Daw Amar. Their incisive political commentaries and analyses made a significant contribution to the country's yearning for independence and unified struggle against colonial rule. Their publications had never carried advertisements for alcohol, drugs to enhance sexual performance or gambling, nor racing tips, salacious affairs and gossip. U Hla had to be persuaded to make an exception of film advertisements for the survival of the paper.

One morning in 1948, soon after Burma gained her independence from the British, however, the Kyipwa Yay Press in Mandalay was dynamited to rubble by government troops who were angry that the Ludu couple appeared to be sympathetic to the Communists. This was a time when regime change happened quite often with the city falling into the hands, in turn, of the Karen rebels, Communists and the new nationalist government under U Nu. The entire family, including two pregnant women, was thrown out into the street, lined up and was about to be gunned down when a number of monks and locals successfully intervened to save their lives. Although only an ardent reformist, if left-leaning, and recognised as such from the early days by his friends and colleagues, the accusing finger of being a Communist by successive governments was never to leave him, even when many in the ruling party of the day, including Ne Win, knew him personally. Hardline leftists, on the other hand, regarded him as weak and indecisive, lacking in revolutionary commitment.

U Hla was an active founding member of the Writers Association of Burma and chaired the Upper Burma section. In 1952 he attended, with Thakin Kodaw Hmaing, Zawana, Shwe U Daung, Dagon Taya and U Ohn Lwin, the Conference for Peace in the Asia Pacific Region in Peking. In October 1953 the AFPFL government imprisoned U Hla under Section 5 for sedition as a political prisoner which spawned a whole genre of life stories of his fellow inmates among others that he published after his release in January 1957:

1. Lei hnint a tu (လေးနှင့်အတူ) – Along with the Wind, translated into Japanese
2. Htaung hnint lutha (ထောင်နှင့်လူသား) – Prison and Man, winner of the Sapei Beikman Award in 1957
3. Hlaungyaing dwin hma hnget nge mya (လှောင်ချိုင့်တွင်မှာငှက်ငယ်များ) – Young Birds in a Cage, translated into English under the title The Caged Ones and winner of the UNESCO award for literature in 1958.
4. Ah lone kaung gya yè lah (အားလုံးကောင်းကြရဲ့လာ) – Are You All All Right?
5. Yèbaw hnint maung gyi hnama (ရဲဘော်နှင့်မောင်းကြီးနှမ) – Soldier and Maiden
6. Sit achit hnint htaung (စစ်အချစ်နှင့်ထောင်) – War, Love and Prison 1960, translated into English under the title The Victim.
7. Za-nee hnint tha thami mya tho htaung dwin hma payza mya (ဇနီးနှင့်သားသမီးများသို့ထောင်တွင်မှာပေးစာများ) – Letters from Prison to Wife and Children
8. Sit peeza htaung daga (စစ်ပြီးစထောင်တံခါး) – Post-War Prison Gates
9. Ma-nee dè bawa hka-yee (မနီးတဲ့ဘဝခရီး) – Life is a Long Journey

Whilst inside U Hla remained active organising sporting and literary events for inmates and invited friends from the world of sport, arts and literature to these special events as a bridge between the outside world and those inside. He formed a football team and took up golf. His fellow political prisoners remembered him as having the most visitors, and that he was anxious to share all the news and the food from outside. U Hla was an accomplished public speaker with a ready smile and great sense of humour but without pride or prejudice. He was friendly and polite and concerned with the health and well-being of everyone and soon he would become U-lay Hla (Uncle Hla) to the younger inmates. He would not forget to visit them in prison after his release bringing food, books and even a radio on one occasion.

== Military era ==
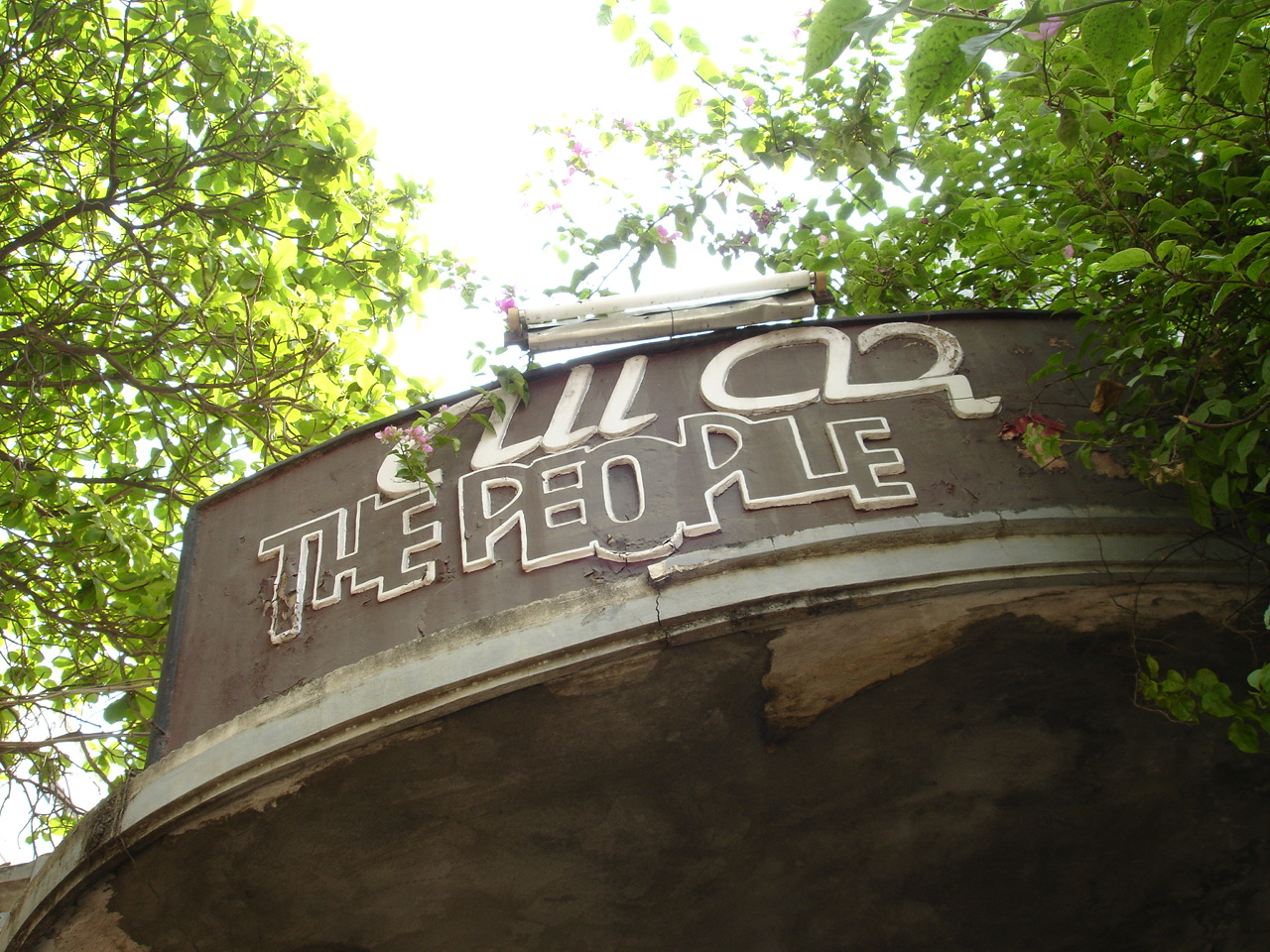
Ludu The People on 84th and 33rd Mandalay

U Hla had nurtured a new generation of young writers and artists from the University of Mandalay and elsewhere in Upper Burma such as poets Tin Moe, Kyi Aung, Maung Swan Yi, Maung Pauk Si and Ko Lay (Innwa Gon-yi), writers Maung Tha Noe, Maung Tha-ya, Maung Thein Naing and Maung Saw Lwin, artists Paw Oo Thett and Win Pe as well as old established ones such as writers Sagaing U Hpo Thin, Shwe Kaingtha and Marla and artists U Ba Gyan, U Aung Chit and U Saw Maung. The Ludu Daily carried a Monday extra dedicated to poetry, and with U Hla's encouragement the young poets published an anthology titled A-nya myei hkit gabya (Modern Poetry from Upcountry). Book reviews, critical essays on literature and research papers in local history, arts and crafts enjoyed nearly as many column inches as domestic and international news and analysis. U Hla would not try and influence the content or edit out the young writers' efforts but he would ensure that they could back up any assertions or claims they might make. He would never talk down to them although he often complained that they had talent but they lacked effort; one of his dreams was for them to form a writers' co-operative and run their own publishing house.

The paper had featured articles about the Soviet Union and the People's Republic of China; there had been a series of articles titled "From the Volga to the Ganges". Shwe U Daung, the chief editor, had translated "The Heroes of People's China". An old school friend of Daw Amar's father, he was famous for his excellent adaptations of Sir Arthur Conan Doyle's Sherlock Holmes and Brigadier Gerard as well as his translations of H. Rider Haggard's Allan Quatermain novels and was arrested at the same time as U Hla but he was to remain in Mandalay Prison for the duration.

The social calendar of Mandalay was, by the 1960s, featuring U Hla either as an organiser or as a guest speaker, from anniversaries such as National Day to hospital fund-raising and the founding of an old people's home. He served on numerous committees and the Senate of Mandalay University. He would often jokingly refer to himself as a "Mandalayan by marriage". He was liked and respected by senior Buddhist monks as well as the layfolk but he distanced himself from religious affairs as such. His popularity reached a level where a plot to assassinate him by some of the politicians, who became jealous and feared he might run for office, existed but only came to light after his death.

The Writers Association of Upper Burma reached a peak in its activities in the 1960s and the 1970s with U Hla at its helm. Sazodaw Nei (Writers' Day) in December each year eventually stretched to Sazodaw La (Writers' Month) with talks and seminars open to the public, paying obeisance to older writers, and subsequently literary talk and research tours which were very popular. U Hla insisted that these must not be a financial burden to the locals. He encouraged and ensured that the papers read at these seminars, both critical reviews in literature and research papers, were published in book form. It was during this period that he started collecting folk tales travelling up and down the country. U Hla encouraged ethnic Mon Thakin Aung Pe and Rakhine U Kyaw Yin to do the same among their own people. When the very first volume Kayin ponbyin mya (Karen Folk Tales) was planned, his assistant editor pointed out that it would lose money; he was given a lengthy explanation by U Hla how profit was immaterial in an effort to bring out in print something that would contribute to better understanding among the peoples of Burma and to unifying them, and how it was far more important to make sure these cultural treasures of ethnic minorities were not lost to future generations.

U Hla had also been the same driving force behind the revival of folk songs, from the early days of the Kyipwa Yay with Yadanabon Hpo Hmatsu's Shwebo bongyi than (drum music) and Maung htaung tay (rice-pounding songs), and Thuriya Kandi's Rakhine tay folk songs. The poet Maung Swan Yi was delegated the task one generation later, and one of the results was Lègwin dè ga ludu tay than mya (People's Songs from the Paddy Fields). He was delighted when presented with copies of Inle taik tay and Taung-yo Danu tay, songs from Inle Lake and around, by the local compilers who were inspired by him. The transfer to Mandalay University during this period of two of his old friends, Rakhine U Kyaw Yin as dean and Dr. Than Tun as professor of history, provided a boost to the literary and research activities, and the weekly Saturday seminars (Sanei Sapei Waing) came into being. The Ludu couple was well known to all foreign scholars of Burmese and the Ludu House in 84th. street was invariably the first port of call in their itinerary in Mandalay.

It had always been a strongly held conviction of U Hla that language should be simple and easily accessible to the readers. He had advocated speed reading and easy writing to the young writers, and when they started a campaign for writing Burmese in the colloquial form instead of the prevailing archaic literary form, he embraced and promoted it with the help of U Kyaw Yin and Dr. Than Tun while Daw Amar expressed some reservations at first. It was a very controversial movement in the history of Burmese literature, regarded as left wing and subversive by conservative traditionalists and in government circles.

In addition to his daily column Thaung pyaung htweila yay gyin ya-ya ("Medley Writings", later published in 3 volumes), U Hla also compiled and published during this period 3 sets of chronicles:

  1. Thadinza mya thi thamaing go pyaw nei gya thi – Newspapers Chronicle History
  2. Thadinza mya pyaw pya dè sit atwin Myanma pyi – Wartime Burma as Chronicled by Newspapers
  3. Thadinza mya pyaw pya dè sit peeza Myanma pyi – Post-war Burma as Chronicled by Newspapers 1969

Two other volumes were published posthumously:

  1. Kyundaw sa-daan kyundaw ahaan mya – My Seminar Papers, My Speeches 1983
  2. Hnit ta-ya ga auk-pyi auk-ywa – Lower Burma One Hundred Years Ago 2002

== Demise of the Ludu Daily ==
The Ludu Daily

The peace talks of 1963 marked a very exciting time in the post-war history of Burma. Expectations ran high and the Ludu family was no exception in looking forward to a new beginning for the country with peace in the offing, after 15 years of civil war that had flared up and smouldered in turn stifling development and progress. The paper campaigned for the success of the peace talks just as it had done in the early 1950s for world peace and an end to the civil war in Burma. It turned out to be a false dawn, and as the peace process broke down U Hla's oldest son Soe Win, aged 22 and a leader of the Rangoon University Students Union, went underground with several other student leaders to join the Communists. Four years later, in 1967, he was killed with several others in a bloody purge in the jungles of the Bago Yoma range of mountains, repercussions from the Cultural Revolution in China which had also led to violent anti-Chinese riots in Rangoon. The Ludu couple, true to Burmese Buddhist tradition, declined an invitation by the authorities to visit their son's jungle grave. Soe Win's younger brother Po Than Gyaung (b. 1945) was arrested in July 1966 and was put in detention (without charge or trial) till May 1972 for alleged clandestine student political activities. Po Than Jaung spent the earlier part of his detention inside Mandalay jail and later on the Cocos Island in the Andaman Sea. The military regime closed down the Ludu Daily on July 7, 1967. U Hla had been busy on the state-sponsored campaign for literacy that year in the heat and dust of Upper Burma.

When the Hanthawaddy newspaper was launched in 1969, to fill the void in Mandalay, U Hla helped the editor U Win Tin, who was to become a leader of the National League for Democracy, in getting the paper off the ground, just as he had helped the Mandalay Thuriya when its editor and publisher U Tun Yin died during the war and his 18-year-old son had to step into his father's shoes. U Hla was a firm believer in the pivotal role of the printed word in nation building and in collaboration with others in order to achieve this common goal.

== Ludu Books and Kyipwa Yay Press ==
The printing machines in 84th street had no time to gather dust as U Hla concentrated his efforts in bringing out volume after volume of books, his own and others' including Daw Amar's translations and analyses in international politics and her treatises on traditional Burmese theatre, dance and music now that they could no longer write about domestic politics. He began interviewing people from all walks of life so he could retell their stories to his reading public and the result was a series of kyundaw books:

  1. Kyundaw byu-ro karat (ကျွန်တော်ဗျူရိုကရတ်) – I the Bureaucrat 1970
  2. Kyundaw sa-tee pwèza (ကျွန်တော်စတီးပွဲစား) – I the Steele Broker 1970
  3. Kyundaw thadindauk (ကျွန်တော်သတင်းထောက်) – I the Reporter 1971
  4. Kyundaw hlei tha-gyi (ကျွန်တော်လှေသားကြီး) – I the Boatmaster 1972
  5. Kyundaw myinthama (ကျွန်တော်မြင်းသမား) – I the Gambler on Horses 1972
  6. Kyundaw thanlwin hpaungzee (ကျွန်တော်သံလွင်ဖောင်စီး) – I the Salween Rafter, translated into Japanese
  7. Kyundaw hsin oozi (ကျွန်တော်ဆင်ဦးစီး) – I the Elephant Driver
  8. Kyundaw hsa-chet thama (ကျွန်တော်ဆားချက်သမား) – I the Saltmaker, published posthumously in 1986

U Hla also published the letters he had received from Theippan Maung Wa, about 500 of them, in a book titled Thu sa mya ga pyaw dè Theippan Maung Wa – Theippan Maung Wa as Profiled by His Letters. He himself wrote about 700 letters to the older writer from 1933 to 1942 until the latter's untimely death soon after the Japanese invasion. Theippan Maung Wa's plays that had appeared in the Kyipwa Yay magazine under the pen name of a woman, Tin Tint, were the next to be re-introduced by U Hla to the reading public in another book titled Tint Tint Pyazat (Plays by Tint Tint). U Hla was again instrumental in the search for and eventual publication of Theippan Maung Wa's War Diary (Sit atwin neizin hmattaan).

Travelogues were another genre among U Hla's prolific writings:

  1. Indonesia anauk hma ashei tho – Indonesia West to East
  2. Japan pyi ta-hkauk – A Sojourn in Japan
  3. Naga taungdaan dazi dazaung – A Glimpse of the Naga Hills

Children's books besides his massive collection of folk tales include:

  1. Su htoo pan yaukkya – A Man of Supreme Wish, written for his oldest son Soe Win, aged 3, during the war in 1944
  2. Ko Pyu nè Ma Pyone – Ko Pyu and Ma Pyone Cartoons by U Ba Gyan, the first book to be published by the Kyipwa Yay Press in Mandalay

U Hla was forever concerned about the youth of Burma and his endeavours in their education include:

  1. Lu ta lone – A Person of Substance 1977
  2. Ayet-thama a-hma ta htaung – One Thousand Errant Ways of an Alcoholic
  3. Ayet-thama a-hma hna htaung – Two Thousand Errant Ways of an Alcoholic
  4. Beinbyu thama a-hma gaba – A World of Errant Ways of a Heroin Addict 1974
  5. Sayleik nè lutha – Tobacco and Man, co-authored with Daw Amar who smoked from age 8 till her 40s and whose family business was tobacco

It has been said that, in the history of Burmese literature, no other writer has been as prolific as U Hla. He appeared to have an all consuming passion for the world of letters, and an inexhaustible amount of energy in not only writing, publishing and travelling for research and to give talks but in corresponding with all his friends and his readers. He remained active in civic and communal life; the Ludu couple was invited by the authorities to give talks to students from both Rangoon and Mandalay Universities taking part in a campaign for the reconstruction of the damaged temples of Bagan in the great earthquake of 1975.

== Final years ==
U Hla was imprisoned for the fifth time in 1978, this time with his wife Daw Amar and their youngest son Nyein Chan (b. 1952) who were both released later than U Hla in 1979. His second son Po Than Gyaung had gone underground in 1976 to join the Communists like his brother before him. U Hla's death at the age of 72, in August 1982, was unexpected by most who knew him as someone who had always lived a healthy life, although he developed diabetes later in life. He was suddenly taken ill just as he was about to be interviewed by a Japanese woman researcher accompanied by the writer Maung Tha-ya, rushed to hospital, and he died the same evening.

U Hla was survived by his wife Ludu Daw Amar (b. 1915), daughter Than Yin Mar (b. 1943, rtd. professor of medicine who has started writing as well assuming the pseudonym Dr. Mya Myitzu), son Po Than Gyaung (b. 1945, current spokesman for the Communist Party of Burma), daughter Tin Win (b. 1947, in charge of Kyipwa Yay Press), and son Nyein Chan (b. 1952, a popular writer of short stories and travelogues, he started writing after his father's death under the name Nyi Pu Lay). Ludu Daw Amar (b. 1915) died recently on 7 April 2008 at the age of 93.

Ludu U Hla was a prime example of what an individual could achieve in a lifetime for the common good, although he would be the first to condemn one-upmanship. History is full of able men who fell by the wayside and lost sight of their own goals and forsook their own principles and convictions. U Hla was of the people, for the people, and never abandoned the people he loved and set out to serve from a very young age. To paraphrase one of his younger colleagues, Ludu Sein Win, even though U Hla had never taken up arms in the revolutionary struggle from colonial times, for he had such great compassion, and if his far-sightedness and forbearance were seen as ineptitude by young radicals, he was a "saintly revolutionary", to be compared with China's Lu Hsun, though not a revolutionary saint.

== See also ==
- Ludu Daw Amar
