= Theippan Maung Wa =

Burmese writer

- Theippan Maung Wa
- Born: Sein Tin; 5 June 1899; Moulmein, Burma, British India
- Died: 6 June 1942 (aged 43); Gada Village, Kanbalu, British Burma
- Education: Rangoon College; Oxford University
- Occupation: Writer
- Spouse: Khin Than Myint
- Parent(s): Ohn Shwe; Thit

Theippan Maung Wa (Burmese: သိပ္ပံမောင်ဝ [θḛɪʔpàɰ̃ màʊɰ̃ wa̰]; 5 June 1899 – 6 June 1942) was a Burmese writer, and one of the pioneers of the Hkit San literary movement. The movement searched for a new style and content in Burmese literature before the Second World War starting with Hkit san ponbyin (Experimental Tales, 1934, 1938).

== Early works ==
He started writing newspaper articles whilst still in high school assuming the pen name Waziya Tint. In 1919, he graduated from the Maha Buddhaghosa High School with distinctions in Burmese and Pali literature. Soon after he began his studies in Rangoon College in 1920, the first university student strike in the history of Burma broke out, and he left university to teach at the first of the National Schools that came into being, as an act of defiance against the colonial education system, until 1923. Sein Tin resumed his studies later and graduated B.A. Hons. with distinctions in Burmese in 1927, the first student in Burmese history to do so.

Theippan Kyaungtha Maung Mya Thwin (Science Student Maung Mya Thwin) was the pen name he used in the Campus magazine and in the Ganda Lawka magazine established by J S Furnivall where the Hkit San movement joined by such writers as Zawgyi and Min Thu Wun began to take shape. He then started to write under the name Theippan Maung Wa in the Dagon magazine published by Ledi Pandita U Maung Gyi and the Kyipwayay (Growth) magazine published by U Hla; both of these became a platform for the Hkit San movement. He also wrote plays in Kyipwayay assuming a woman's name, Tint Tint, besides literary critiques and other articles.

== Civil servant and writer ==
Sein Tin went on to Christ Church of Oxford University to study for the Indian Civil Service exam and on his return from Britain in 1929, served as a district officer in rural Salin Township, Burma during the colonial period.

He wrote a series of small sketches based on his observations of rural life, many of which were critical of political and economic institutions, both colonial and indigenous, such as the following works,

- Pyissandarit (The Backwaters or Limbo, 1933, Ganda Lawka) was a glimpse at life in a small Burmese fishing village before World War II. It depicts the harsh circumstances in the village and the petty feuds that arose among its inhabitants.
- Leilan Pwè (The Auction, 1933, Ganda Lawka) took place during the colonial period. The story is a depiction and implicit critique of a fishery auction, a Western economic institution not particularly well-suited to the Burmese as the story shows.
- Ma-yway Mi (Eve of Election, 1932) took place before World War II during the colonial period. It describes the political factionalism that was arising among Burmese politicians even at this early date and which would only increase in post-independence Burma.

A collection of 36 of these short stories, published between 1929 and 1941 mostly in Ganda Lawka, became prescribed school text in the 1960s published by Sarpay Beikman. His letters to Kyipwayay U Hla between 1933 and 1942 were published by the latter, subsequently known as Ludu U Hla, 3 decades later. U Hla also published Tint Tint Pyazat (Plays by Tint Tint); he had been instrumental in the search for and the eventual publication of Sit Atwin Neizin Hmattan (War Diary) in 1966.

== Death ==
Theippan Maung Wa was killed by armed robbers near Kanbalu during the Japanese invasion in 1942 on the day after his 43rd birthday.
