= Ko Lay Inwa Gonyi =

Burmese poet (1936–2025)

Ko Lay
- ကိုလေး
- Born: 11 August 1936; Inwa, Burma Province, British India
- Died: 22 November 2025 (aged 89); Mandalay, Myanmar
- Education: Mandalay University
- Occupation: Poet
- Children: Ma Ni Tar
- Writing career
- Pen name: Ko Lay Inwa Gonyi
- Notable work: Lann Thit Poems (1965)
- Notable awards: Myanmar National Literature Award for Poetry (1965); Lifetime Award for the Myanmar National Literature Award (2014)

Ko Lay (Burmese: ကိုလေး; 11 August 1936 – 22 November 2025), known by his pen name Ko Lay Inwa Gonyi (ကိုလေး (အင်းဝဂုဏ်ရည်)), was a Burmese poet and recipient of the Lifetime Award for the Myanmar National Literature Award. He began writing poetry in the sixth grade and went on to win the Myanmar National Literature Award for Poetry in 1965.

== Early life ==
Ko Lay, the eldest of three siblings, was born on 11 August 1936 in Zegyo, Babaedan Ward, Inwa, to U Chon and Daw Magyi. During the Second World War, he attended Inwa Gonyi School, which had been established in Inwa by Daw Ohn and teachers from Mandalay National School, who had fled the war from Mandalay, together with his father U Chon. He passed the matriculation exam in 1954 and studied pure science at Mandalay University from 1954 to 1959, reaching Inter Part B.

== Career as a poet ==
Ko Lay began writing poetry in the sixth grade. While at Mandalay University, he served as a librarian of the student dormitories, and was active in the university's pen club. His first published poem, Our Place the Golden Inwa, appeared in the August 1952 issue of the Mandalay Myanmar Lann Zin newspaper. He soon became well known among Mandalay University student poets and, together with Tin Moe, Maung Swan Yi, and Kyi Aung, was regarded as one of the four leading "Poet Commanders". His poetry collection Lann Thit Poems won the First Prize of the 1965 National Literature Award for Poetry. From 1967 through 2012, he was restricted from publishing under the country's military government due to his involvement in pro-democracy movements. In 2014, Ko Lay received the Lifetime Award for Myanmar Literature, and in 2022, he was awarded the Alinkar Kyawswa by the Burmese government.

== Personal life and death ==
Ko Lay married Nyunt Nyunt in 1958. Their daughter, Ma Ni Tar, is also a poet; her 2018 poetry collection Palpitations to Inwa won the National Literature Award for Poetry. Ko Lay died in Mandalay on 22 November 2025, at the age of 89.

== See also ==
- Burmese literature
- List of Burmese writers
