= Ludu =

Ludu may refer to:

== People ==
- Ludu Daw Amar (1915–2008), Burmese dissident writer and journalist
- Ludu Sein Win (1940–2012), Burmese writer, journalist, and teacher
- Ludu U Hla (1910–1982), Burmese journalist, publisher, chronicler, folklorist and social reformer, husband of Ludu Daw Amar
- Remus Ludu (1914–1982), Romanian gymnast

== Places ==
- Lüdu, a county in Jiyin Commandery in ancient China
- Ludu, a village in Ponoarele Commune, Mehedinți County, Romania
