= Maung Swan Yi =

Burmese critic, poet and writer (born 1937)

- Born: Win Pe; February 17, 1937 (age 89); Myingyan Township, Myanmar
- Education: Mandalay University
- Occupations: Critic; Poet; Writer
- Writing career
- Notable works: Poems of Red and Blue (1964)
- Notable awards: Myanmar National Literature Award for Poetry (1964)

Maung Swan Yi (born 17 February 1937) is a Burmese critic, poet, and writer. A graduate of the Burmese Department of Mandalay University, he is a laureate of the Myanmar National Literature Award for Poetry and is regarded as one of the four Burmese "Poet Commanders."

== Early life and education ==
Maung Swan Yi was born Win Pe on 17 February 1937 in Kansint South Village, Myingyan Township, to U Thein Pe and Daw Tin Kyi. He is the eldest of seven siblings. He received his early education in his hometown before transferring first to Minbu Government High School and later to Mandalay Regional High School No. 1, where he completed his matriculation examination. He pursued higher education at Mandalay University, earning a bachelor's degree in Burmese language and literature. From his student years at Mandalay University, he participated in student movements at the university and was actively involved in the Upper Myanmar Writers Association. He was a vice secretary of Mandalay University's student union, vice secretary of the Writers Association of Upper Burma, secretary of Mandalay University's annual magazine committee, and secretary of the Mandalay University Pen Club. A highly skilled poet, he became known as one of the four leading “Poet Commanders,” alongside Tin Moe, Kyi Aung, and Ko Lay Inwa Gonyi, all of whom were distinguished poets from Mandalay University.

== Career ==
After graduating, Maung Swan Yi worked as a member of the Civics and the Myanmar Language Curriculum Committee, and later became the secretary of the School Textbook Committee. He also worked as a librarian at the Basic Education Department, an external lecturer and examiner in the Department of Library Studies at the University of Yangon, and a member of the advisory editorial board of the Pyinnya Tansaung education magazine. He also served as an executive committee member and joint secretary of the Myanmar Writers Association. His collected poetry volume Poems of Red and Blue received the Myanmar National Literature Award for 1964.

Maung Swan Yi was known for his critiques of military dictators, often expressed through his poems. He was included in the intellectual group at the founding of the National League for Democracy. He moved to the United States in the 2000s due to his involvement in democracy movements and has resided there since. His critical work Myanmar Literature: What Is It? Where Is It? (1976) remains one of the most widely read works of literary criticism in Myanmar.
