= Khit-San Sarpay =

Khit San Sarpay (Burmese: ခေတ်စမ်းစာပေ, pronounced [kʰɪʔ sáɴ sàpè]; lit. "Testing the Age Literature") was a literary movement that emerged in 1930s British Burma, and is considered the first modern literary movement in the history of Burmese literature. The movement was heavily influenced by modern English literature, and started by young Burmese writers, many of whom were educated in Christian missionary schools. It emerged from the literary contests held by the Burma Education Extension Association. Many short stories in the modern prose appeared in the association's Ganda Lawka Magazine as well as other periodicals. Three collections—Khit-San Ponbyin-mya Volume 1 ("Experimental Tales", 1934), Khit-San Kabya-mya ("Experimental Poems", 1934), and Khit-San Ponbyin-mya Volume 2 (1938), which were edited and selected by Pe Maung Tin came to represent the emerging literary style.

Some of the leading writers of the movement included Theippan Maung Wa, Zawgyi, Min Thu Wun, Maung Htin, Nwe Soe, Maung Thuta, Toe Aung, and E Maung.

== Bibliography ==
- Herbert, Patricia (2004). "Publications of U Pe Maung Tin". In Homage to U Pe Maung Tin. Vol. 9. Northern Illinois University. ISSN 1094-799X.
- Win Pe, U (2009). "Burmese Theatre and Literature under Western Influence". In Doris Jedamski (ed.). Chewing Over the West: Occidental Narratives in Non-western Readings. Rodopi. ISBN 9789042027831.
