= Myo Min =

Thiri Pyanchi Wunna Kyawhtin Myo Min
- မျိုးမင်း
- Born: 7 April 1910; Rangoon, British Burma
- Died: 21 September 1995 (aged 85); Yangon, Myanmar
- Education: Rangoon University; University of London
- Occupations: Academic, writer, journalist
- Spouse: Khin Thin Nwe
- Children: Khin Swe Min, Min Thet Mon, Kyaw Myo, Min Khin Myo
- Writing career
- Pen name: Nwe Soe, U Myo Min, Myint Win
- Genre: Khit-San Sarpay
- Notable works: Ma-ubin, Sein-lan-thaw Taung-gon, Archway English Course
- Notable awards: Thiri Pyanchi; Wunna Kyawhtin

Myo Min (Burmese: မျိုးမင်း, pronounced [mjó mɪ́ɴ]; 7 April 1910 – 21 September 1995) was a Burmese academic, journalist and writer, who wrote under the pen names of Nwe Soe (နွယ်စိုး, [nwɛ̀ só]), U Myo Min and Myint Win. He was one of the founders of the Khit-San Sarpay movement, the first modern literary movement in the history of Burmese literature. He was the longtime Professor of English at Rangoon University and later at Yangon Institute of Education. He also served in several academic and research organizations, including the Burma Historical Commission, the Burma Research Society, and the Burma Translation Society. For his services to the country, he was awarded the honorary titles of Wunna Kyawhtin in 1954 and Thiri Pyanchi in 1961 by the government.

== Brief ==
Myo Min was born on 7 April 1910 in Rangoon (Yangon) to Saw Nu (စောနု) and her husband Po Min (ဘိုးမင်း), a senior civil servant in the British colonial administration. He was the youngest of four children. In his youth, his family constantly moved around the Irrawaddy delta, following the postings of the father, who would later retire as a Deputy Commissioner. Myo Min attended primary school in Hlegu, Rangoon, Kyaiklat, Myaungmya and Ma-ubin. From 5th Standard onward, he attended Rangoon's elite St. John's High School, and passed the university entrance examination with honors in five subjects in 1926. He enrolled in Rangoon University, where he was a classmate of U Thant, and graduated in 1931 with a BA in English with honors. He went on to read law at the University of London, and received a BL in 1936. He returned to the university after the war and received an MA in 1947.

Myo Min started as an adjunct lecturer in English at Rangoon University in the late 1930s, and rose to be the Professor of English—the Department Chair—at the university in the early 1950s. (Note: (Allott 2004: 23): He was already Professor of English in March 1954 when he and Virginia Geiger, cultural attache at the US Embassy, organized a 3-day linguistics seminar in Rangoon.) After the University Education Act of 1964, which broke up Rangoon University into several independent universities and institutes, Prof Myo Min became the chair of the Department of English at Yangon Institute of Education. As an extension of his academic career, he served in several prominent academic and research organizations. He was the secretary of the Bernard Free Library, and a member of the Burma Education Extension Association, the Burma Historical Commission, the Burma Research Society, and the Burma Translation Society. He was a longtime editor of the Journal of the Burma Research Society.

He also served in the Office of the Prime Minister in the administration of Prime Minister U Nu. For his services to the country, Prof Myo Min was awarded the honorary titles of Wunna Kyawhtin in 1954 and Thiri Pyanchi in 1961 by the government.

He was married to Khin Thin Nwe (ခင်သင်းနွဲ့, [kʰɪ̀ɴ θɪ́ɴ nwɛ̰]), a lecturer and fellow academic, and they had four children, Khin Swe Min, Min Thet Mon, Kyaw Myo and Min Khin Myo. He died on 21 September 1995 in Yangon.

== Literary career ==
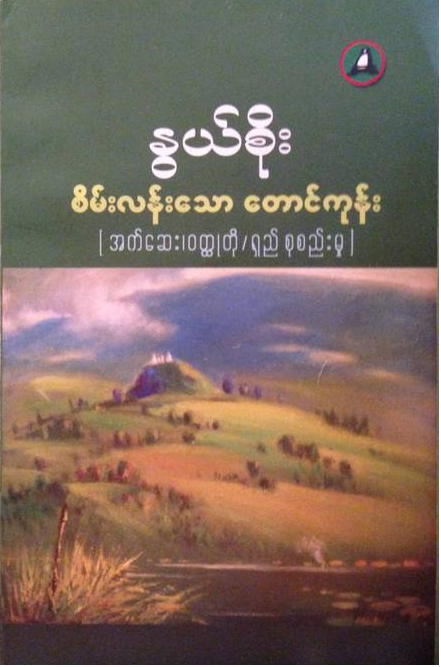
Selected Works of Nwe Soe, a 2010 collection of his notable works

His literary career began while he was a student at Rangoon University. Starting in 1927, he began writing in the publications of Lungemya Kyipwayay Athin (လူငယ်များ ကြီးပွားရေး အသင်း, "Growth for Youth Association"). He came of age at a time when Burmese literature was experiencing its first modern literary movement, called Khit-San Sarpay (ခေတ်စမ်းစာပေ, lit. "Testing the Age Literature"). The movement was heavily influenced by modern English literature, and started by young Burmese writers, many of whom like Myo Min were educated in Christian missionary schools. Starting in 1935, under the pen name of Nwe Soe, he wrote several short stories and articles, as well as a few poems, in magazines associated with the Khit-San movement—Kyipwayay (ကြီးပွားရေး, "Growth") Magazine by Ludu U Hla and Ganda Lawka (ဂန္တလောက, "World of Books") Magazine by JS Furnivall. He later became an editor at Ganda Lawka.

He wrote several articles and short stories in magazines. Some of the notable works are:

- Ma-ubin (Kyipwayay Magazine, December 1935)
- Kutho Hset (Ganda Lawka Magazine, March 1936)
- Sein-lan-thaw Taung-gon (Ganda Lawka, September 1936)
- Naing-ngan-yay (Ganda Lawka, December 1937)
- A-chit Lay-ba (Ganda Lawka, (month?) 1937)
- Set-hmu Kariya (Ganda Lawka, August 1937)
- Anya-Gyaik (Ngwetaryi Magazine, August 1960)
- Kan...Kan (Ngwetaryi, September 1960)
- Sedana Shin (Ngwetaryi, November 1963)

He also wrote books and articles under the name U Myo Min:

- Archway English Course (1957)
- Learning English (1959)
- Old Burma (?)
- Burmese Entertainment (The Atlantic, February 1958)

== Bibliography ==
- Allott, Anna (2004). "The Life and Work of an Outstanding Burmese Scholar". In Homage to U Pe Maung Tin. Vol. 9. Northern Illinois University. ISSN 1094-799X.
- Bingham, June (1966). U Thant: The Search for Peace. Knopf.
- Butwell, Richard (1963). U Nu of Burma (2, illustrated, revised ed.). Stanford University Press. ISBN 9780804701556.
- Burma Research Society (1968). Journal of the Burma Research Society. 51 (1). The Burma Research Society.
- Nwe Soe (2010). Sein-lan-thaw Taung-gon: Selected works of Nwe Soe (in Burmese). Ya-Pyei Publishing.
- Swan Yi, Maung (December 2002). "'CHEWING THE WEST': The Development of Modern Burmese Literature Under the Influence of Western Literature" (PDF). Leiden University. Archived from the original (PDF) on 11 April 2008.
