= Burma Education Extension Association =

- Formation: 1928–1942
- Type: Education
- Headquarters: Rangoon, British Burma
- Location: Rangoon
- Founder: JS Furnivall

The Burma Education Extension Association (Burmese: မြန်မာနိုင်ငံ ပညာ ပြန့်ပွားရေး အသင်း) was a Rangoon (Yangon)-based educational organization founded by JS Furnivall to promote "the intellectual advancement of the country", and the predecessor organization to the Burma Translation Society.

The association aimed to encourage the publication of translations into Burmese, establish public libraries, form reading circles and study classes throughout the country, and to publish a monthly periodical to include articles on literary topics, social problems, political economy, and the modern world. The association took over the publication of The World of Books, which Furnivall had published since February 1925, and spun off a Burmese language version called Ganda Lawka ("World of Books" in Pali) in February 1930. The Burmese monthly, which "welcomed modern Burmese prose, original ideas and criticism", was edited by a succession of young Burmese writers, including Zawgyi, Min Thu Wun, Sein Tin, and Nwe Soe. The association was restarted after World War II by U Nu in 1947 as the Burma Translation Society, which exists today as Sarpay Beikman.

== See also ==
- Burma Translation Society

== Bibliography ==
- Allott, Anna (1996). "The Study of Burmese Literature: A General Survey". In E. Ulrich Kratz (ed.). Southeast Asian Languages and Literatures: A Bibliographic Guide to Burmese, Cambodian, Indonesian, Javanese, Malay, Minangkakau, Thai, and Vietnamese. I.B.Tauris. ISBN 9781860641145.
- Nwe Soe (2010). Sein-lan-thaw Taung-gon: Selected works of Nwe Soe (in Burmese). Ya-Pyei Publishing.
