= Basic Education High School No. 9 Mawlamyine =

Secondary school in Mon State, Myanmar

Coordinates: 16°28′29.7″N 97°37′26.4″E

Shin Maha Buddhaghosa High School
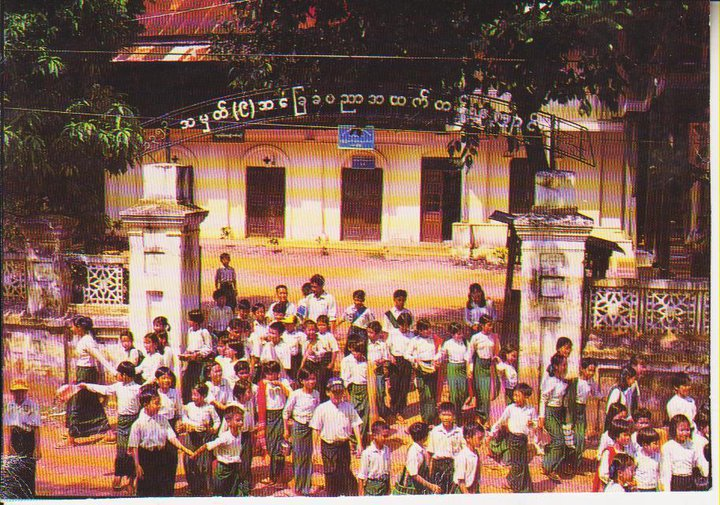
- School in the 1990s

Location
- Pabedan Street; Mawlamyine, Mon State; Myanmar

Information
- Type: Public
- Established: 1899; 127 years ago
- Founder: Sāsanādhāra Society
- School number: 9
- Principal: Thidar Kyi
- Grades: KG to G12
- Enrollment: ~2500

Basic Education High School No. 9 Mawlamyaing (Burmese: အခြေခံ ပညာ အထက်တန်း ကျောင်း အမှတ် (၉) မော်လမြိုင်; commonly known by its original name, Shin Maha Buddhaghosa National School (Burmese: ရှင် မဟာဗုဒ္ဓဃောသ အမျိုးသား အထက်တန်း ကျောင်း) is located on Pabedan Street, in Mawlamyaing, Mon State, Myanmar.

Founded by the Sāsanādhāra Society in 1899 during the British colonial period, the school produced notable writers and politicians who played a role in the Burmese independence movement. Today, the school remains one of the most prestigious high schools in the city. It maintains a diverse student body consisting of students from various financial and ethnic backgrounds.

== History ==
=== Background ===
Before the British colonial period, the education system in Burma was primarily driven by Buddhist monasteries at least since the 11th century. The Buddhist monastic school system gave Burma a literacy rate considerably higher than those of other Asian countries in the early 1900s. In the colonial period, the British administration and Christian missionaries founded Western education centers including St. Patrick's School (now B.E.H.S. No. 5) of the De La Salle Brothers in Moulmein. In 1869 in Lower Burma, there were 340 "Lay Schools" with 5069 students, providing basic Western education. In comparison, 3438 monastic schools were operating in the region, providing Buddhist education to over 44,000 students. Traditional methods of teaching, however, became obsolete in the British colonial environment. The influence of Buddhist monasteries in towns and villages diminished considerably as well. The retreat of Buddhist monasteries left a vacuum in education, filled increasingly by Christian missionary schools. Threatened by the growth of Christian education, Buddhist Burmese founded several Anglo-Vernacular high schools in the 1890s. Founded in 1899, No. 9 B.E.H.S., then known as Shin Maha Buddhaghosa National School was among the first nationalist schools founded in the region.

=== Founding and colonial era ===
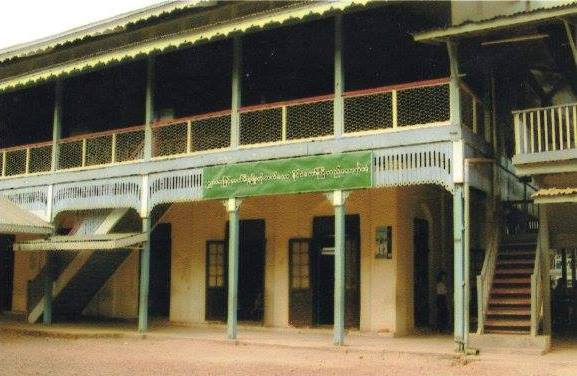
The U Thar Nyin Dhammayone

In 1898, several Western educated Burmese saw a need to foster traditional teachings in the context of Western institutions and values. Yan Win, an ethnic Mon alumnus of a British missionary school, was encouraged by his British friend, Commissioner Bernard Houghton to start social work in Moulmein. Meanwhile, lawyer Shwe Thwin and other Burmese scholars were finding ways to establish nationalist institutions. Collaborating, they founded the Sāsanādhāra Society to foster traditional Buddhist teachings. The Society in turn decided to establish the Buddhaghosa National School in 1899 with Yan Win as its headmaster, a position he held until his death in 1906. Upon its founding, the school heavily emphasized on Burmese and Pali teachings. The standard textbook for Burmese History was Maha Yazawin by U Kala.

Theipan Maung Wa, a pioneer of the Hkit San literary movement, graduated from the school in 1919.

By 1920, nationalist sentiments ran high in Burma. During this period, a wealthy teak merchant Thar Nyin, the father of a key YMBA leader Chit Hlaing, donated a two-storey teak building to the school named U Thar Nyin Dhammayon, which remains today. One of the pioneers of Burmese literature, Sein Tin, commonly known by his pen name Theippan Maung Wa, matriculated from the school in 1919. Toward the end of colonial era, the nationalist movement continued to gain momentum and the school appointed a well-known Burmese nationalist scholar Hla Thwin as its headmaster. In March 1929, the father of Indian independence movement, Mahatma Gandhi visited Moulmein. In a conference held at the Buddhaghosa School on 13 March 1929, Gandhi addressed to a crowd of 25 Buddhist monks, 100 Burmese women, 800 Burmese men and 300 Indians. Gandhi expressed great pleasure for preponderance of Burmans at the meeting.

=== Independence era ===
In 1964, on the eve of nationalization policy enforced by Burmese Socialist Programme Party, the school was nationalized and renamed to No. 9 Basic Education High School Mawlamyine. Its former name continues to be used side by side with official name. The school curriculum and uniforms were changed to align with national standards.

=== Contemporary era ===
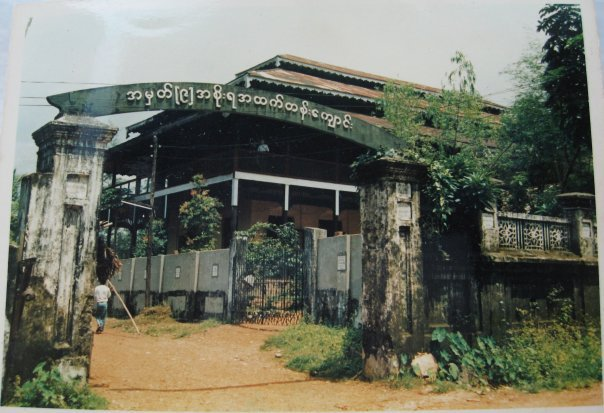
The high school in the 2000s.

The Shin Maha Buddhaghosa High School remains one of the most esteemed high schools in the city. From 2002 to 2006, it had the highest overall matriculation exam passing rates in Mon State. Unlike most renown high schools in Burma, it has maintained a diverse student body, covering all walks of life and ethnicity. In a nod to its founding principles, the school celebrates the Burmese National Day Festival every year, featuring traditional games, foods and dances. The school has a reputation for instilling patriotism into students and has its own anthem.

== Buildings and facilities ==
The very first building was Sitke Gyi U Saung's old building which dated back to 1899. Then the plot of Kyaung DaGar Gyi U Hlay's son-in-law U Maung Maung was purchased with 500 kyats by the school administration board to expand the school area. In 1904, the two-storey middle building (office room building) was started to build and finished in 1905, May, 17. The two-storey U Thar Nyin Damayon was built in 1911 to replace Sitke Gyi U Saung's old building. In 1916, three-storey boarding building was built for outstanding students with underprivileged background. In1983, two-storey Theint-pan Saung, in 1992-93 Myat Mon Yadanar Saung, in 1999, Yar Pyae Saung, in 2007-08 Myint Thandar Saung, in 2014 Gandamar Saung were built.

On August 3, 2023, a fire broke out at the three-storey building and the office building. The incident occurred at approximately 11:50 PM and quickly progressed to the fourth stage of fire development. Firefighters and emergency responders were promptly dispatched to the scene, and their efforts led to the successful extinguishing of the fire by 5 AM on August 4, 2023. According to a resident, a burning smell was detected earlier, and the cause of the fire is likely due to an electrical failure.

In the early hours of 25 October 2023, U Thar Nyin Damayon with over a century of history, fell victim to an arson attack. Security cameras captured a woman on a bicycle around 1:00 AM, the suspected arsonist. The fire was reported by a resident at approximately 3:00 AM, triggering a rapid response from Mawlamyine Fire Department, aided by both residents and local rescue groups. By 4:45 AM, their collective efforts succeeded in containing the fire. Tragically, the 110-year-old U Thar Nyin Damayon and the multimedia building on the school's campus were lost in the blaze.

== Notable alumni ==
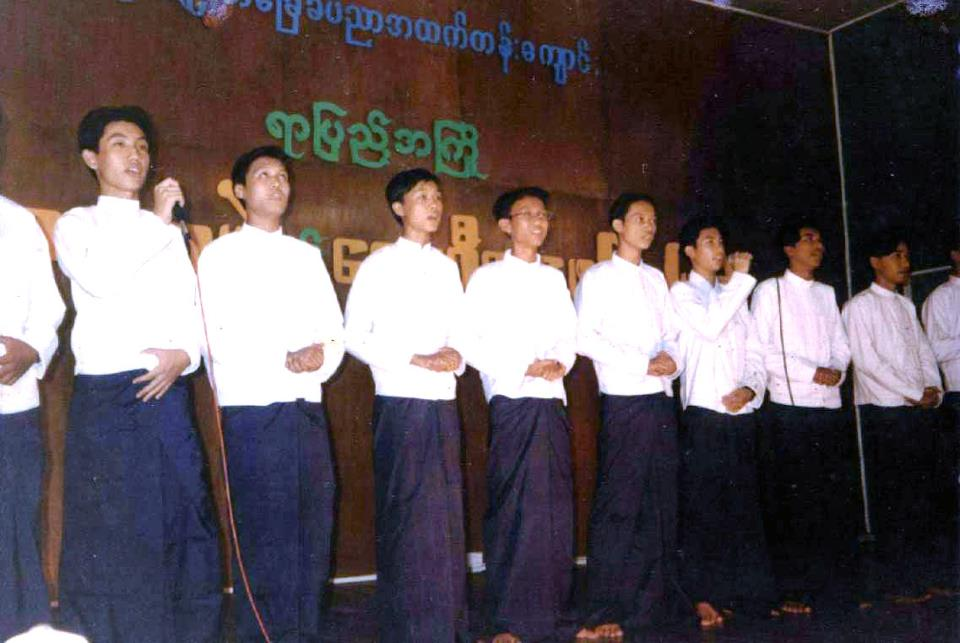
Centennial ceremony in 1998

Alumni of Maha Buddhaghosa School include some of the most accomplished writers, physicians and politicians of Burma.

- Theippan Maung Wa, one of the pioneers of Hkit San literary movement, matriculated from the school with distinctions in Burmese and Pali literature in 1919. He was appointed as head of the prestigious Department of Oriental Studies at the National Central School in Rangoon. His proses influenced Burmese literature for half of a century and continue to be taught in high school textbooks to this day.
- Thakin Soe, a member of Dobama Asiayone and political leader of Anti-Fascist People's Freedom League.
- Sein Win, 4th Prime Minister of Burma (1974 - 1977)
- Toe Aung (Ku Tha), a leading writer of Hkit San literary movement and Head of Moulmein Intermediate College (1953 - 1963)
- Kyaing Kyaing, former First Lady of Myanmar
