= Oway =

Voice of Burma Students

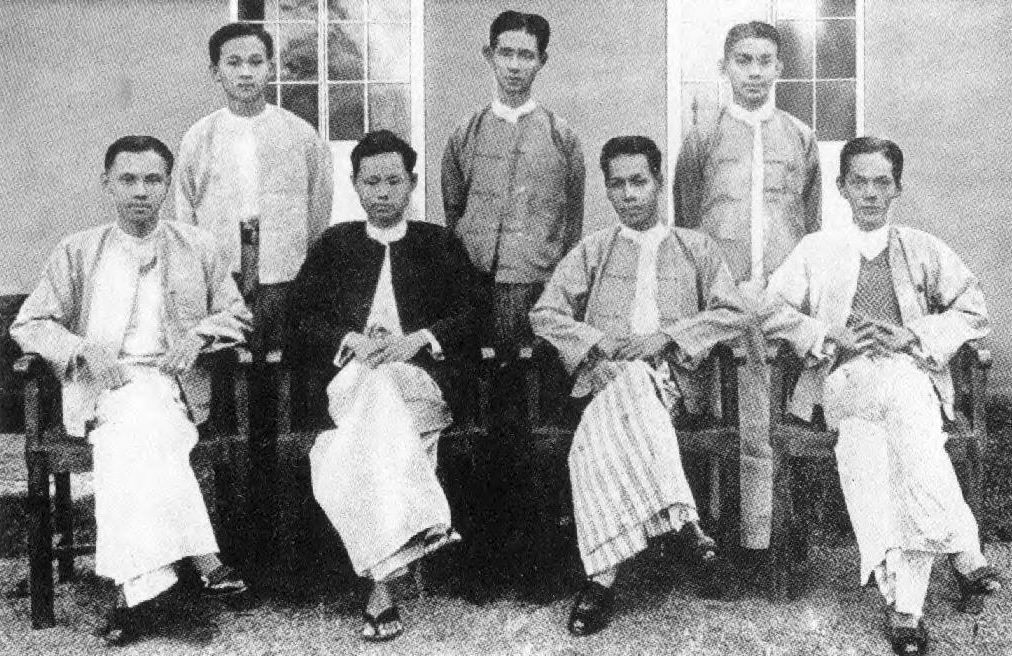
Portrait of the editorial committee of Oway Magazine in 1936.

Oway (Burmese: အိုးဝေ; lit. 'Peacock's Call') is a political magazine first published in January 1931 by the All Burma Federation of Student Unions (ABFSU)—the country's leading student alliance. The magazine played a significant role in the Burmese student movement, serving as a platform for nationalist ideas and anti-colonial discourse during British rule.

== History ==
Originally published in January 1931 as the University Students' Magazine by politically active students, the publication appears to have continued under the title Rangoon University Students' Union Magazine following the establishment of the Rangoon University Students' Union (RUSU) later the same year. The first editor-in-chief was retired Professor Mya Kay Tu. It was subsequently renamed Oway (meaning "Peacock's Call") following a proposal by Nyo Mya, who introduced the slogan:

"Burma is the land of the peacock,
Oway is the voice of the peacock."

The name change, approved by editor Aung San (later a key leader in Burma's independence movement).

In November 1935, RUSU held its executive committee elections for the 1935–36 academic year. Aung San was elected as an executive member and assumed the role of editor-in-chief of Oway magazine. A year later, in December 1936, RUSU held elections for the 1936–37 term, during which Aung San was elected vice president of the union. With the increased responsibilities of his new leadership role, he could no longer devote time to editing Oway. As a result, Nyo Mya took over as editor-in-chief from 1936 to 1937.

In the January 1936 issue (Volume 5, No. 1) of Oway, an English-language article titled "Hell Hound at Large" appeared under the pseudonym Yama Min. The piece openly criticized corruption by a university official, indirectly targeting not only campus authorities but also the British-backed coalition government of the time. When university administrators demanded that editor Ko Aung San reveal the author’s identity, he refused on journalistic ethical grounds, stating:

"If action must be taken, take it against me."

In response, Ko Nu (later Prime Minister U Nu), then president of the Rangoon University Students' Union (RUSU), was expelled for permitting the article's publication. Aung San was also expelled for protecting the anonymous writer.

Following the expulsions, Ko Rashid, a Muslim student leader, assumed the RUSU presidency. A mass student assembly was convened, culminating in a university-wide second major student strike, the first having taken place in 1920.

In 1952, the renowned Burmese nationalist leader and writer Thakin Kodaw Hmaing contributed a significant article titled "Rangoon University Oway Magazine Dedication" to the publication. His piece served as a call for student unity and anti-colonial resistance, while also addressing the threat of Kuomintang (Chinese Nationalist) incursions into Burma's northern territories during the early 1950s. The magazine published a total of 19 issues from 1931 to 1961.

In the early 2020s, the Rangoon University Students' Union (RUSU) attempted to revive Oway magazine as part of efforts to reclaim student activism heritage. However, RUSU leaders were warned by the Deputy Director General of Literary Censorship.

Following the 2021 coup and the outbreak of the Spring Revolution, the All Burma Federation of Student Unions (ABFSU) along with RUSU officially relaunched Oway as a biweekly political journal.

== Controversies ==
After the victory of the second major student strike, a poem titled "A Nai Ma Khan" (Never Yield) appeared as the headline feature in the January 1936 issue (Volume 5, No. 1) of Oway. The original poem is a Burmese translation of "Invictus" by William Ernest Henley. The poem became a symbol of victory and held significant historical importance in Burma; however, it was published anonymously and the authorship of the poem has been subject to considerable debate. While many attributed the work to Aung San, others believed it was written by either Nyo Mya or Min Thu Wun. The earliest known claim identifying Aung San as the author came from Dr. Maung Maung, a view later supported by Mya Kay Tu and Maung Htin. However, in an article published on 10 August 2012 in The Myanmar Post Global journal, Tekkatho Sein Tin identified Min Thu Wun—not Aung San—as the true author of the Burmese poem. This claim, however, is considered weak and lacks supporting evidence.
