= Dagon Taya =

Burmese writer

- ဒဂုန်တာရာ
- Born: Htay Myaing; 10 May 1919; Kyaiklat, British Burma
- Died: 19 August 2013 (aged 94); Aungpan, Southern Shan State, Myanmar
- Education: Rangoon University
- Occupations: Writer, journalist
- Writing career
- Pen name: Myaing Thazin, Maung Nan Nwe, Saw Htut, U Toe, Maung Linn Htet, Banya Thiha, U Dagon
- Notable work: May (1947)
- Notable awards: Sarpay Beikman Literary award (1961); Pakokku U Ohn Pe Life Time Achievement award (2001); Manhae Prize (2013)

Dagon Taya (Burmese: ဒဂုန်တာရာ; 10 May 1919 – 19 August 2013; also spelt Dagon Taryar), born Htay Myaing, was a Burmese writer. His other pen names were Myaing Thazin, Maung Nan Nwe, Saw Htut, U Toe, Maung Linn Htet, Banya Thiha and U Dagon.

== Early life and education ==
He was born in May 1919, at Htai Ku Myit Tan Village (Mon), Kyaiklat Township, Ayeyarwady Region. His parents were Ba Ohn and Phwa Shin. He completed high school in 1937 and studied at Rangoon University from 1937 to 1940.

== Career ==
He published Taya (Star) Magazine in December 1946. He edited Oh Way Magazine, Sarpay Thit (New Literature) Magazine and Gandawin (Classics) Journal. Some of his famous works are May, Irrawaddy-Yangtze-Volga, Kyaban Yayzin, Literary Theory, Literary Criticism, Literary Movements, Our Age Will Certainly Come One Day, Bewildered Spring Nights, Profiles Sketches at a Glance, Words, A Patch of Oil, A Harp String and Velvet Curtain. He won the Sarpay Beikman Literary award for his collection of short stories Sabe Oo (The First Jasmine Blossom) in 1961.

He witnessed and participated in the country's independence struggle as a student activist. He was one of the chairmen of the Rangoon University Student Union. He was one of the many dissident politicians, workers, students and writers detained by the Revolutionary Council after a coup led by General Ne Win in 1962. He was detained in the Insein prison for three years and three months. He issued an appeal which strongly opposed the Myitsone Dam Project in September 2011. He was honored with Manhae Peace Prize from South Korea for his literature, leadership for young people and dedication to democracy and peace in August 2013.

== Death ==
He died at Aungpan, Southern Shan State on August 19, 2013. His monument can be seen at the Maeko Mountain (မယ်ခိုတောင်) of Aungpan surrounded by pine trees.
