= Shwe U Daung =

Shwe U Daung ရွှေဥဒေါင်း
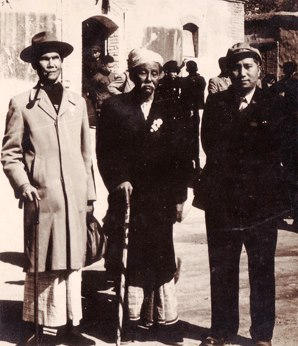
- From left to right: Shwe U Daung, Thakin Kodaw Hmaing and Ludu U Hla
- Born: Pe Thein; October 24, 1889; Man Kyee Tone, Shwebo district, British Burma
- Died: August 10, 1973 (aged 83)
- Occupations: Writer; translator; editor
- Parent(s): Ayar (father); Shwe (mother)
- Awards: Translation Award (1952, 1955); Lifetime Achievement Award (1961)

Shwe U Daung (Burmese: ရွှေဥဒေါင်း ("Shway Oo Daung", "golden peacock" in translation); 24 October 1889—10 August 1973) was a Burmese writer, translator, teacher, forestry clerk, magazine editor and newspaper editor-in-chief. Over his lifetime, he wrote a significant number of books including original works, adaptations, and essays. He was well applauded for his translations and adaptations of Sherlock Holmes as well as Detective U San Shar, his Burmese counterpart; it is considered his most iconic work regarding translation literature in Myanmar. This literary innovation and his influence on modern Burmese literature earned him multiple awards, including the esteemed Sarpay Beikman Manuscript Award.

Shwe U Daung's works reflect the whole era of Burma at that time, addressing themes such as colonial resistance, moral responsibility, and the importance of cultural identity. He was one of the most influential writers of Myanmar literature; his works bridged traditional narratives and style of writing and the emerging modern literary styles of the 20th century.

== Early life ==
=== His birth ===
Shwe U Daung (U Pe Thein) was born on 24 October 1889 (Burmese calendar: 2nd of the waxing moon, Tazaungmon, 1251) in Shwebo District, British Burma (now Myanmar). His birth name was Maung Pe Thein, but he later adopted the pen name "Shwe U Daung" ("Golden Peacock"), symbolising Burma's regal identity under the Konbaung dynasty before British colonisation. His father was U Ayar, and his mother was Daw Shwe. He was the third of five siblings.

His father, U Ayar, served as a parliamentary clerk during King Thibaw's reign and later worked as a shoemaker during the colonial period. His mother, Daw Shwe, served as a reader during King Thibaw's reign and was honored with the title of Taninkathi village chief. After King Thibaw, his wife Supayalat, and their two infant daughters were coerced by the British authorities to move to Ratnagiri, British India, a port city on the Arabian Sea. Following the fall of monarchy in 1885 and King Thibaw's exile, Shwe U Daung's family faced the hardships of colonial life. These struggles deeply influenced the young Maung Pe Thein's worldview.

=== Childhood ===
Shwe U Daung was born after the British occupation of Burma, a period of great instability as the country transitioned from a sovereign kingdom to a British colony. Growing up, he experienced the complexities of a country in transition, as its people adapted to the new political realities of colonial governance. His early life was characterised by poverty and hardship which had a significant impact on his subsequent works.

== Education and life ==
=== Education ===
Shwe U Daung's early education was at the Buddhist Monastery in Mandalay. Later, transferred to the ABM School at young adult .His love for literature began during his time at the ABM School. At that school, he developed a deep passion for reading in the 8th grade. He Immersed himself in classic English novels and became a lifelong enthusiast for literature. This enthusiasm finally inspired him to become a writer.

=== Life ===
In 1908, he passed the entrance exam at the University of Calcutta, although he did not have the opportunity to attend. Instead, he began working as a teacher at the Mandalay Buddhist School and the ABM School. Later, he shifted to a civil service career and worked as a clerk in the administration office in Shwebo and subsequently at the Forestry Office. He eventually transitioned to the Agriculture and Cooperative Commissioner's Office in Mandalay, working as a forestry clerk.

At the age of 21, Shwe U Daung married for the first time while working as a forestry clerk. However, the marriage ended after three years. In 1914, after leaving his job, he remarried but faced another divorce in 1920. His third marriage to Daw Soe, whom he met during a visit to Mya Taung Village in Katha District, became a stable marriage until his death.

Shwe U Daung's love for reading, which was deeply nurtured since childhood, caused his desire to write. On the night of November 8, 1915, he began working on his first novel, Yangyi Aung (ရန်ကြီးအောင်)(translation: Yan Gyi Aoung). The novel was later published by the Suriya newspaper, from which he got one hundred silver coins as payment, and this was the beginning of his writing career.

He was encouraged by Suriya U Babay to write his second novel, Yadanabon (ရတနာပုံ)(translation: Ya Da Nar Bon), inspired by the English novel East Lynne. Because of the success of these two novels, he was appointed as an editor at Suriya Magazine. This editor position brought him fully into the literary world. It was this time when he adopted the pen name "Shwe U Daung" (Golden Peacock), a homage to the peacock symbol of Suriya Magazine, which had played a pivotal role in launching his career as a writer.

== Career ==
=== Early career ===
In his early career life, he wrote a lot of articles, novels, and short stories in Thuriya Newspaper ( In the early 1920s, Shwe U Daung, along with a friend, co-founded Myanmar's first journal, the Myanmar Strategy Journal. However, his tenure at Suriya Magazine ended in 1920 because of a disagreement, and he was dismissed from his position. After this, he relocated to Kangni village in Htigyaing Township, where he spent two years teaching English.

At the age of 36, Shwe U Daung entered monastic life with the aim of becoming a monk and practising meditation. He had to leave monastic life due to a severe case of malaria. He then worked irregularly to support his family while continuing to write.

In 1926, Shwe U Daung temporarily worked as a secretary at the New Burma Press. In 1930, he joined the Christian Literature Association in Bago City as a translator, where he translated over 20 books during his three-year tenure. In 1936, Suriya Magazine invited him back, appointing him as editor of the Suriya newspaper.

His literary career flourished during this time, with his most famous creation, Detective San Shar, which was published for the first time in 1917. He wrote this modelled after Arthur Conan Doyle’s Sherlock Holmes, but San Shar was adapted to suit Burmese culture and became a national sensation, published through the Suriya magazine associated with the Young Men's Buddhist Association (YMBA).Many readers were unaware that these works were translated from foreign sources and sent letters to him asking who San Shar is and where he is. Over nearly five decades, Shwe U Daung wrote close to 160 San Shar episodes.

In addition to adaptations, Shwe U Daung wrote original works such as Myat Thet Maw and Hsu Gyi Pan, and so many other books that included over 50 long novels and more than 300 short stories.

Shwe U Daung's literary contributions introduced Burmese readers to Western literature. Among his most famous translations are She by H. Rider Haggard (Burmese: Rupanandi) and The Jungle by Upton Sinclair. His adaptation of Charles Dickens’s Great Expectations won him the Literary Temple Translation Award in 1952, and his translation of The Jungle won the same prize in 1955.

He also wrote several non-fiction works, including How to Stay Healthy Through Nutrition, Prosperity Through Good Advice, and a travelogue, New China in Person. In 1961, at the age of seventy-two, Shwe U Daung published a comprehensive autobiography titled "Record of Life and Thoughts" (Translation: Tathetta Hmattan hnint Ahtweakhawmyar), an unprecedented move in Burmese literature at the time. The autobiography offered personal reflections on his life, his career as a writer, and his views on the political and social changes that had occurred in Burma over the previous half-century. In this work, he also elaborated on his concept of the "Burmese gentleman," a figure who embodied the ideals of modernity, morality, and national pride.

His autobiography remains a significant text for understanding not only Shwe U Daung's personal journey but also the broader cultural and intellectual shifts taking place in Burma during the 20th century. It is considered one of the few works that provides an intimate glimpse into the life of a Burmese intellectual navigating the complexities of colonialism, war, and independence.

=== Later Career and Advocacy ===
During World War II, Shwe U Daung faced severe financial difficulties, but his wealth improved in the Post-war era. He became a committed reader of left-wing literature and continued his meditation practice. While serving as editor-in-chief of a Mandalay Public Daily, the AFPFL (The Anti-Fascist People's Freedom League ဖက်ဆစ်ဆန့်ကျင်ရေး ပြည်သူ့လွတ်လပ်ရေး အဖွဲချုပ်) regime imprisoned him for over five months. Following his release, he became editor-in-chief of the Workers’ People's Daily under the revolutionary government after 1962, retiring in 1968.

Additionally, he represented Myanmar in the People's Republic of China and the Soviet Socialist Republics at the World Peace Congress.

== Published books ==
No.	Name	Release year	Note
1	Pa Hta Man Saya Thein	1949	
2	Ko Yan Taw (Bodyguard)	1950	Translation
3	Yadanabon	1953	
4	Thway Sote Myay (The Jungle)	1955	Translation
5	Sanda Dewi	1960	
6	ဒိဋ္ဌေဒိဋ္ဌမတ္တံလက်တွေ့ကျင့်စဉ်	1960	
7	Swint Wint Thu	1961	
8	Rupanandi	1961	
9	Yangyi Aung	1961	
10	Autobiography and philosophies (တသက်တာမှတ်တမ်းနှင့် အတွေးအခေါ်များ)	1961	
11	Detective Mg San Shar	1961	Adaptation
12	Gamone Nat (Black Tulip)	1961	Translation
13	Sit Shone Thu	1961	
14	Rupa Kalyani	1961	Adaptation
15	Jamada Ko Ko Gyi	1962	
16	Discussion	1962	
17	Dagon Tint	1962	
18	Burmese Ability	1962	
19	Doctor Taung Htike	1962	
20	Prosperity through Good Advice	1962	
21	Sar Paday Thar	1962	
22	New China in Person	1962	
23	Nutrition and Health Experienced in Person	1963	
24	Black Garuda Gang	1963	
25	Thein Htike	1964	
26	Three Wa	1964	
27	Vankanta	1964	
28	Yadana Thike (The Count of Monte Cristo)	1964	Translation
29	Adventurer	1965	
30	Thu Daw Sein	1965	
31	Su Gyi Pan and other short novels	1965	
32	Time Mechanism	1965	
33	Chit Pan Pwint	1965	
34	Zaw Heik	1965	
35	Religious Belief	1965	
36	Everything Hitler did	1968	Translation
37	Myaw Ta Lint Lint (The Expectations)	1969	Translation
38	A Guide to Writing	1970	
39	Lwan Aung Phan	1970	
40	High Morals and Burmese Abilities	1975	
41	Collected Works of Detective U San Shar	1977	Adaptation
42	Buddhism and Conceptual Affairs		
43	Mya Thet Maw	1951	
44	Shakespeare's Plays		Translation
45	Theological Discussions	1969	
46	Lat Htet Taw Gyi		
47	Lincoln		
48	Three Heros		Translation
49	A Big Pot of Thoughts		

== Ethical, Political and Religious Beliefs ==
Shwe U Daung's works were more than just popular entertainment; they were deeply intertwined with the growing Burmese nationalist movement. The Young Men's Buddhist Association (YMBA), which had been inspired by the Theosophical Society, played a significant role in promoting Burmese nationalism during the colonial period. Shwe U Daung's writings reflect the YMBA’s mission to promote Burmese literature and culture.

After Burma gained independence in 1948, Shwe U Daung became increasingly critical of the political developments in the country. He had supported the idea of a free and independent Burma, but he was disappointed by the corruption and inefficiency of the post-independence governments. His writings during this period reflect a deep dissatisfaction with many politicians, who had once fought for independence, had become corrupt and self-serving. His critique of the government and its leaders grew sharper. Though he did not engage in politics directly, Shwe U Daung's critical voice represented the frustrations of many Burmese intellectuals and citizens who felt that the ideals of the nationalist movement had been betrayed. He believed in the importance of morality and ethical governance. We can see this idea in his later works, particularly as Burma faced political instability and economic challenges.

Shwe U Daung's religious beliefs were deeply rooted in Buddhism, which played a significant role in both his personal life and his writings. At the age of 36, Shwe U Daung even entered the monkhood, showing his deep dedication to Buddhist practice. Even in his political writings, Shwe U Daung's criticism of corrupt leaders was originated in his Buddhist beliefs. He viewed Buddhism as not just a personal spiritual path but also as a guiding principle for creating a just and harmonious society.

== Legacy ==
The Ludu Library in Mandalay houses a complete collection of Shwe U Daung's works.

== Death ==
Shwe U Daung died on Friday, 10 August 1973 (Burmese calendar: 12th waxing moon, Wagaung, 1335), at the age of 83. His wife, Daw Soe, wrote a will about Shwe U Daung's manuscript royalties to support aspiring writers before her death.

According to the will, she delegated the responsibility of giving the money received for Shwe U Daung's manuscripts to suitable young writers in consultation with prominent figures:

Thukha

Ludu U Hla

Thaw Tar Swe

Win Tin
