= Ludu Library =

Archive library in Mandalay, Myanmar

- လူထုစာကြည့်တိုက်
- 21.973908574716383°N 96.07813807290319°E
- Location: Mandalay, Myanmar
- Type: Private
- Established: 2004; 22 years ago

Collection
- Items collected: Books; newspapers; magazines; parabaiks; palm-leaf manuscripts
- Size: 50,000 books

Other information
- Director: Than Yin Mar

The Ludu Library and Archive (Burmese: လူထုစာကြည့်တိုက်နှင့်မော်ကွန်းတိုက်) is a public library and newspaper archive in Letsekan quarter, Chanayethazan Township, Mandalay, Myanmar. Construction began in 2000, and the library was formally founded in 2004 by the family of Ludu U Hla and his wife Daw Amar, prominent Burmese writers. The library was an extension of a private collection curated by the Ludu family and survived the 1984 Kya Gyi fire in Mandalay.

The library is a prominent reference library for Burmese scholars. Ludu Library possesses a collection of 50,000 books, 210 palm leaf manuscripts and 130 parabaiks, and also special collections of prominent Burmese writers, including Than Tun, Shwe U Daung, and Ludu Sein Win.
