= The World of Books =

Monthly magazine published in Myanmar

- Editor: JS Furnivall
- Frequency: Monthly
- Publisher: JS Furnivall; Burma Education Extension Association
- First issue: February 1925
- Country: British Burma
- Based in: Rangoon
- Language: English

The World of Books was an English language monthly magazine published by JS Furnivall and later by the Burma Education Extension Association. It spawned off a sister Burmese language monthly Ganda Lawka

== Bibliography ==
- Allott, Anna (1996). "The Study of Burmese Literature: A General Survey". In E. Ulrich Kratz (ed.). Southeast Asian Languages and Literatures: A Bibliographic Guide to Burmese, Cambodian, Indonesian, Javanese, Malay, Minangkakau, Thai, and Vietnamese. I.B.Tauris. ISBN 9781860641145.
