= Ganda Lawka =

- Editor: Zawgyi, Min Thu Wun, Nwe Soe
- Frequency: Monthly
- Publisher: Burma Education Extension Association
- First issue: February 1930
- Final issue: c. 1942
- Country: British Burma
- Based in: Rangoon
- Language: Burmese

Ganda Lawka (Burmese: ဂန္တလောက, pronounced [ɡàɴda̰ lɔ́ka̰], lit. "World of Books") was a Burmese language monthly magazine published by the Burma Education Extension Association. The magazine was a sister publication of The World of Books, the English language monthly started by JS Furnivall. It "welcomed modern Burmese prose, original ideas and criticism." Ganda Lawka was edited by a succession of young Burmese writers, including Zawgyi, Min Thu Wun, Sein Tin and Nwe Soe.

== Bibliography ==
- Allott, Anna (1996). "The Study of Burmese Literature: A General Survey". In E. Ulrich Kratz (ed.). Southeast Asian Languages and Literatures: A Bibliographic Guide to Burmese, Cambodian, Indonesian, Javanese, Malay, Minangkakau, Thai, and Vietnamese. I.B.Tauris. ISBN 9781860641145.
- Nwe Soe (2010). Sein-lan-thaw Taung-gon: Selected works of Nwe Soe (in Burmese). Ya-Pyei Publishing.
