= Tin Moe =

Burmese poet

U Tin Moe
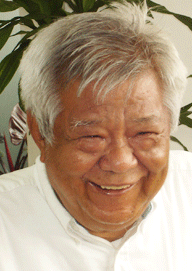
- U Tin Moe
- Born: Ba Gyan; November 19, 1933; Myingyan, Taungtha Township, British Burma
- Died: January 22, 2007 (aged 73); Los Angeles, California
- Education: University of Mandalay
- Occupation: Poet

U Tin Moe (Burmese: တင်မိုး, MLCTS: tangmui:; [tɪ̀ɰ̃ mó]) (1933-2007) was a Burmese poet, pro-democracy activist and one-time political prisoner.

== Early life ==
Tin Moe (Maung Ba Gyan) was born in the village of Kanmyè in Taungtha Township, Myingyan, Mandalay Division. He received his early education at a Buddhist monastery, and attended school at the town of Yezagyo. His reputation preceded him when he went on to study at the University of Mandalay at the request of faculty members who had been impressed by an essay he wrote for the matriculation exam. He was already a published poet under the pen name Kan Myè Nan Myint Nwe in the Ludu Journal of Mandalay.

== Fame ==
In 1956 Tin Moe collected his poems into a book titled Hpan Mee Ain (English: The Lantern). It won him the National Literary Award for Poetry in 1959. He continued to write poems and essays, and became editor of poetry at the Ludu Daily in Mandalay. He also worked for a time as the editor of Pei Hpu Hlwar magazine.

His early poems were influenced by Min Thu Wun and Zawgyi, who in their time pioneered a new age literary movement while still at Rangoon University. They also inspired him to write poems for children. Some of these were later turned into songs for children and also included in school texts.

== Politics ==
The political upheaval of 1988 in Burma was a turning point in Tin Moe's life. He responded to the criticism of the political content of his later poems such as Sobs and New Pages by referring to Thakin Kodaw Hmaing whose patriotic and satirical poetry spawned a powerful anti-colonial literary movement while Burma was under British rule. He had dedicated one of his earliest poems to his great hero, titled To Grandpa Thakin Kodaw Hmaing.

An active supporter of the pro-democracy movement, Tin Moe was imprisoned in 1991 for four years by Burma's military government for his activities. His work was banned, and after his release he left for the West and moved to the United States as an exile. He traveled through the U.S., Europe, Japan, and Southeast Asia attending literary events. In 2004, the Netherlands honoured him with the Prince Claus Award.

He died on January 22, 2007, in his home away from home in Los Angeles, California, at the age of 73.
