= Kyipwayay =

- Editor: Ludu U Hla
- Frequency: Monthly
- Publisher: Kyipwayay Press
- First issue: early 1930s
- Final issue: 1945
- Country: British Burma
- Based in: Rangoon, later moved to Mandalay
- Language: Burmese

Kyipwayay (Burmese: ကြီးပွားရေး, pronounced [tɕí bwá jé], lit. "Growth") was a pre-World War II Burmese language monthly magazine, closely identified with the Khit-San Sarpay movement, the first modern literary movement in the history of Burmese literature. The magazine was founded by U Thein in Yangon but later taken over by U Hla and moved to Mandalay in 1933. The magazine was published even during the Japanese occupation of the country (1942–1945). After the war, U Hla transformed Kyipwayay into the Ludu Journal.

== Bibliography ==
- Swan Yi, Maung (December 2002). "'CHEWING THE WEST': The Development of Modern Burmese Literature Under the Influence of Western Literature" (PDF). Leiden University. Archived from the original (PDF) on 2008-04-11.
