= Ludu Sein Win =

Burmese writer, journalist, and teacher

- လူထုစိန်ဝင်း
- Born: 13 August 1940; Mandalay, Burma
- Died: 17 June 2012 (aged 71); Rangoon, Burma
- Occupation: Writer
- Spouse: Nu Nu Myat (Died in February 2007)
- Children: Ye Win Zaw, Chaw Ei Win Zaw

Ludu Sein Win (Burmese: လူထုစိန်ဝင်း; 13 August 1940 – 17 June 2012) was a Burmese writer, journalist, and teacher. He is known for his freely writings about social activities and against government through his works. He was recorded as the most writable person in the scenes of Myanmar writers in late 2008.

== Personal life ==
Born from U Thar Din and Daw Kyi Khin in Mandalay, Burma. After finishing high school from Lafor Memorial High School, he went to Mandalay University in 1956 and then, moved to Rangoon University in 1959. While attending the university, he started as a free journalist. In 1964, he worked as a formal journalist in the Ludu Newspaper (The People), Mandalay, Myanmar. In 1967, the Burmese military regime imprisoned U Sein Win and also three editors (U Tin Maung Lay, U Mya Nyunt and U Tin Shein) from Ludu Newspaper (The People), banned in July 1967. He was jailed in Coco Island until 1971 and then, placed to Insein Prison. He was arrested again in 1978 after his release in 1973. When he was in Insein prison, his right side of body was failed to mobile because of suffering a stroke. Incapable of writing by the right hand, he practiced by the left hand. After releasing in 1980, he opened an English centre at his home from 1982 to 2000 being as an English teacher.

== Career ==
U Sein Win used 15 different pen names. His first published book is Soe moe kham (ေစာမုုိးခမ္း) and Taung Vietnam mah nga ye khan myar (ေတာင္ဗီယက္နမ္မွငရဲခန္းမ်ား) - From Mainland Hell to Island Hell was his first translation book. The book which had never been published before is the translation of Peking Diary by Derk Bodde. That book was recently published and sold in April 2013 after he died.

== Final years ==
He turned his writing topic to youth, journalism, ethics and love besides his politics writing which were contributed to Weekly Eleven Journal. Since 2004, he had been aided by oxygen to his breathing because of lung cancer. He died on 17 June 2012. He continued writing till before he died. The article he did not finish is Pyan Lar Pyi Byout (I Am Back!). He wrote at least two articles daily to resist the government through writing.

== Legacy ==
The Ludu Library in Mandalay houses a complete collection of Sein Win's works.
