= Maung Htin =

Burmese writer and journalist

- မောင်ထင်
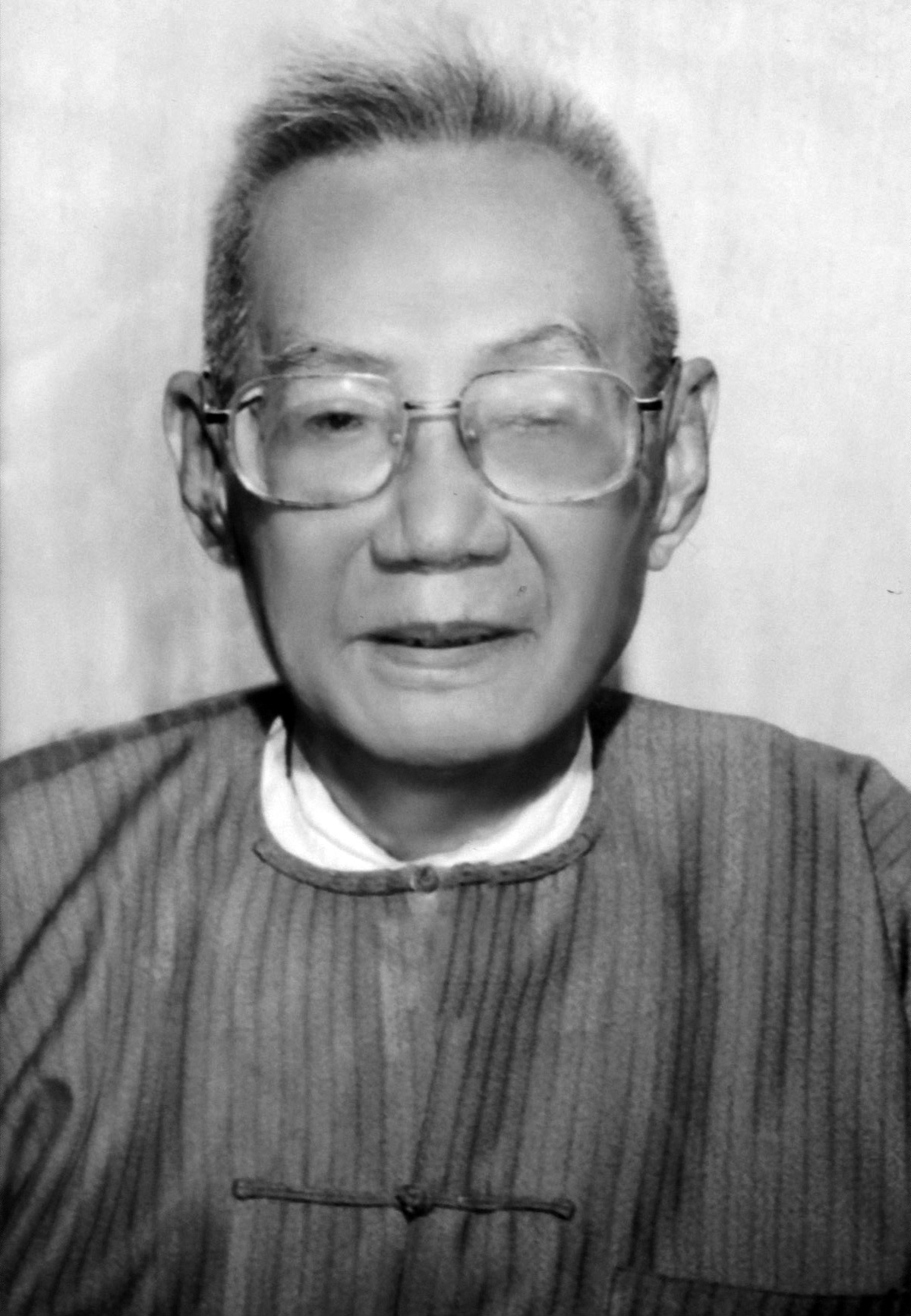
- Maung Htin in 1948
- Born: Htin Fatt (ထင်ဖတ်); 21 March 1909; Labutta, Irrawaddy Province, British Burma
- Died: 29 January 2006 (aged 96); Yangon, Myanmar
- Resting place: Yayway Cemetery
- Education: Rangoon University (B.A.)
- Occupations: Writer and journalist
- Parent(s): Ta Yaung (father); Sein Pwint (mother)

Maung Htin (Burmese: မောင်ထင်; born Htin Fatt) was a prolific Burmese writer and journalist, best known for his classic 1947 novel Nga Ba (ငဘ), which portrayed the lives of downtrodden farmers. In 2003, the Government of Myanmar awarded him with a national lifetime achievement award in literature. In 1933, he graduated from Rangoon University with a Bachelor of Arts degree in Burmese.
