= Zawgyi (writer) =

Burmese poet, author, literary historian, critic, scholar and academic

Thiri Pyanchi Saya Zawgyi
- ဇော်ဂျီ
- Born: Thein Han; 12 April 1907; Pyapon, Irrawaddy Division, British Burma
- Died: 26 September 1990 (aged 83); Myanmar
- Education: University of Rangoon; Trinity College Dublin
- Occupations: Writer, poet, librarian
- Spouse: Saw Yin
- Children: Khin Myo Han; Khin Hla Han; Khin Ohn Han
- Parent(s): Yaw; Sein Nyunt

Signature
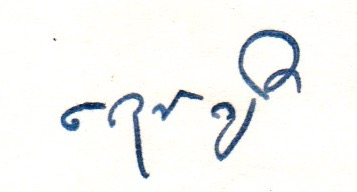

Saya Zawgyi (Burmese: ဇော်ဂျီ, Burmese pronunciation: [zɔ̀d͡ʑì]; born Thein Han (သိန်းဟန်, [θéiɰ̃ hàɰ̃]); 12 April 1907 – 26 September 1990) was a distinguished and leading Burmese poet, author, literary historian, critic, scholar and academic. He is regarded as the greatest of Myanmar's poets. His name, Zawgyi, refers to a mythical wizard from Burmese mythology. He was one of the leaders of the Hkit san (Testing the Times) movement in Burmese literature searching for a new style and content before the Second World War, along with Theippan Maung Wa, Nwe Soe and Min Thu Wun. His first hkit san poetry, Padauk pan (Padauk flower), was published in Hantha Kyemon pamphlet.

His most memorable work was a play titled Maha hsan gyinthu, an adaptation of Molière's Le bourgeois gentilhomme, published in 1934. His most famous poem was Beida lan (The Hyacinth's Way) that traces a journey through life's ups and downs, published in 1963.

== Early life ==
Zawgyi was the eldest in a family of nine. He won the Thissawardi Prize (5 gold sovereigns) from the Thissawardi newspaper for the poem "Sittathukha Linga", translated from the English poet Henry Wotton's "The Character of a Happy Life". He went on to the University of Rangoon, passed the intermediate level with credits in Burmese and won the "Tha Doe Aung" prize.

After graduating with a B.A. in 1929, majoring in Burmese literature, English literature, Oriental and Far East History, Zawgyi became a tutor in the Burmese Department at the university. In 1931, Zawgyi returned to the Myoma High School to teach until 1934. After achieving the MA degree from the Rangoon University in 1936, he became a tutor in Burmese at the Mandalay Intermediate College until 1938 when he went to England to study at the University of London and then at Trinity College Dublin for the Diploma in Library Science.

== Distinguished career ==
In 1941, Zawgyi became Librarian at the University of Rangoon. He married Saw Yin (B.A., BEd). During World War II Zawgyi became Deputy Director General (Literature and Libraries Division) at the Ministry of Education. After the war he returned to his old job as Librarian at the University of Rangoon (called Yangon in Burmese), then from 1947 to 1948 Special Officer for the legislative council and Elections Office. He was awarded the honour of Wunna Kyawhtin for distinguished service by the government.

Between 1950 and 1952, Zawgyi travelled as part of a delegation to Indonesia, Britain, United States, Mexico and Canada. From 1951 to 1957 he was Director of the Textbooks Committee at the Ministry of Education. In 1955 Zawgyi won the Sarpay Beikman "variety in literature" (sa padetha) prize for Thakin Kodaw Hmaing htika. He then became Chairman of the Burma History Commission in 1959.

The year 1961 saw him as Emeritus Professor of Burmese at the University of Rangoon and was awarded the honour of Thiri Pyanchi by the government. He was also President of the Technical Terms Committee and the National Literary Awards Selection Committee. He retired as Librarian of the Universities Central Library in 1967. He was then appointed First Special Officer for Education, President of the Burma Research Society and Adviser for the Burma History Commission.

In 1976 he visited India with Khin Zaw (the author and translator K) where he read a paper on the Ramayana. In 1979 Zawgyi won the National Literary Award for "Nin-la-hè chit dukkha (Damn You, Broken Heart) and Other Short Stories", and in 1987, another for "Ancient Bagan and Other Poems".

== Family ==
When Zawgyi died at the age of 83, on 26 September 1990, he left wife Saw Yin and their three daughters, Dr. Khin Myo Han, Dr. Khin Hla Han and Dr. Khin Ohn Han. His family, students and colleagues created the "Zawgyi prize" and "Ganda Lawka Thingaha prize" for outstanding diploma students in Library and Information Studies and Masters students in Burmese.

== Zawgyi in Burmese myth and culture ==
- Magician's Caves
- Folk Elements in Burmese Buddhism: The Cult of Alchemy
- Zawgyi in Burmese Puppet Theatre
