= Mandalay University =

Arts and science university in Myanmar

University of Mandalay
- မန္တလေးတက္ကသိုလ်
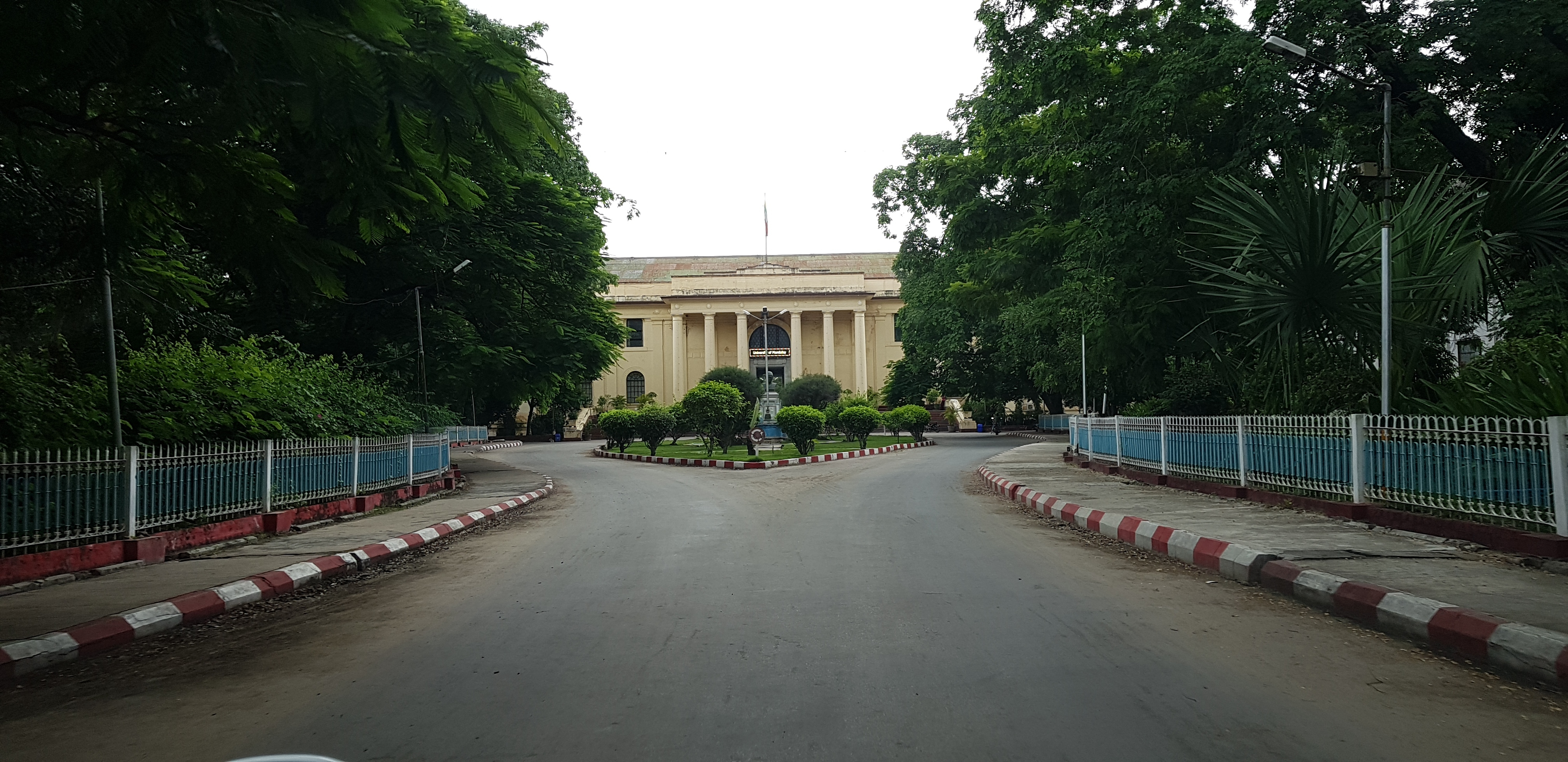
- Former names: Mandalay College (1925); Mandalay University College (1948); Mandalay Arts and Sciences University (1964)
- Motto: ပညာ သမာ အာဘာ နတ္ထိ (Pali: paññā samā ābhā natthi)
- Motto in English: No other light can compete with the brightness of the light of wisdom
- Type: Public
- Established: 1925; 101 years ago
- Affiliations: AUN
- Rector: Dr. Tin Tun (He was removed by the Ministry of Education due to his disaster controlling mismanagements and loses during 2025 Myanmar earthquake, but he remains in the position temporarily)
- Administrative staff: ~541 (academic); ~354 (admin-istrative)
- Students: ~3627
- Undergraduates: ~1434
- Postgraduates: ~2193
- Location: Mahaaungmye, Mandalay, Myanmar; 21°57′30″N 96°5′30″E
- Website: www.mu.edu.mm

Mandalay University (also translated as University of Mandalay; Burmese: မန္တလေးတက္ကသိုလ် [màɰ̃dəlé tɛʔkəθò]) is a public liberal arts and science university located in Mandalay, Myanmar and one of the sixteen autonomous universities under Ministry of Education. Formerly an affiliate of Rangoon University, Mandalay University is the second oldest university in Myanmar, and the oldest and largest university in Upper Myanmar. The university offers mainly undergraduate and postgraduate degree programmes (Bachelor's, Master's, Post-graduate Diploma, and Doctorate) in liberal arts, sciences and law.

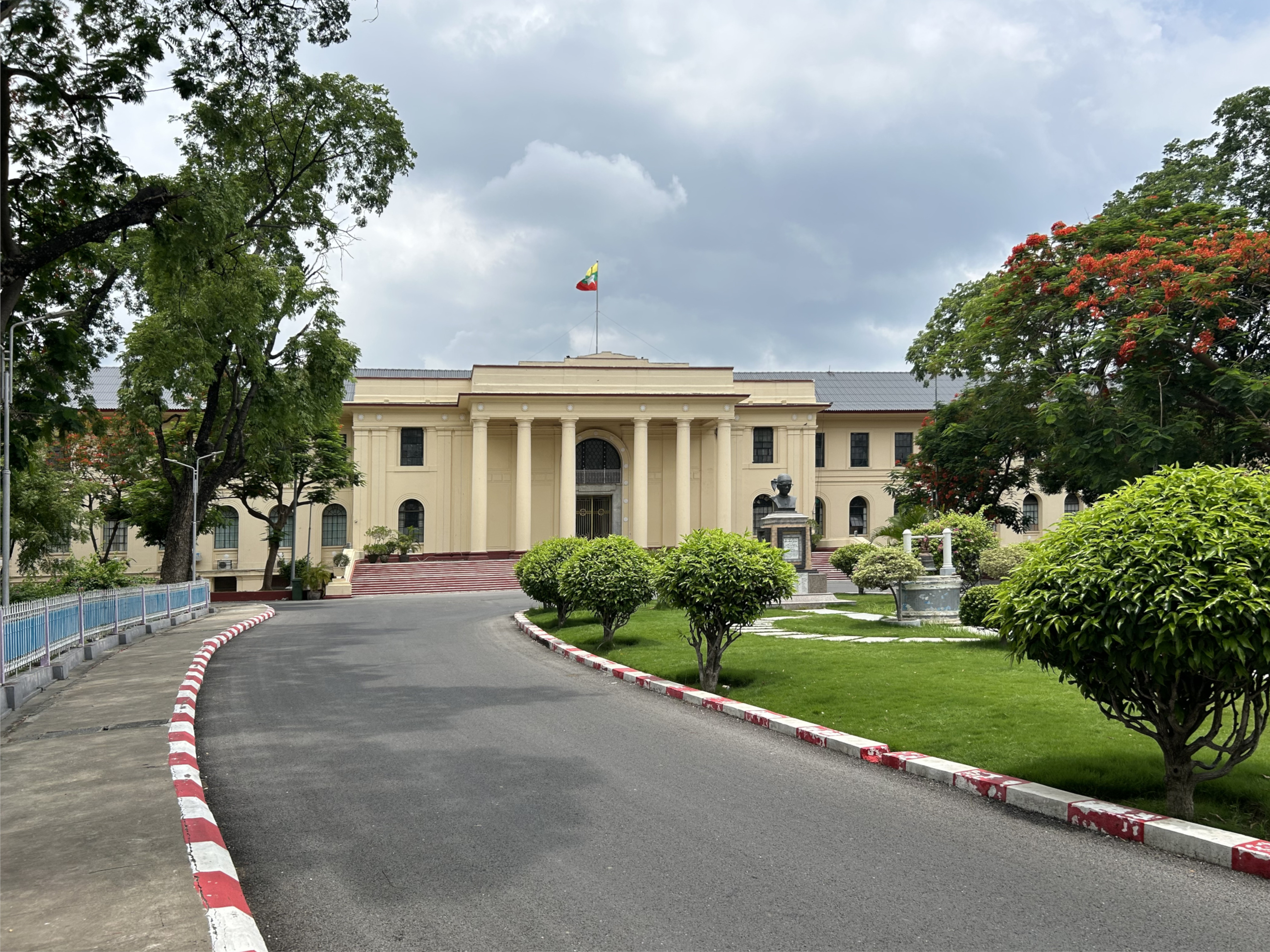
Main Building of Mandalay University

On 28 March 2025, the university was heavily damaged in a fire that started during the 2025 Myanmar earthquake and led to the collapse of the main building.

== History ==
=== Foundation ===
Mandalay University was established as Mandalay College, an affiliated college of Rangoon University in 1925. The college was closed down beginning in 1942 because of World War II and was reopened only after the war in 1947.

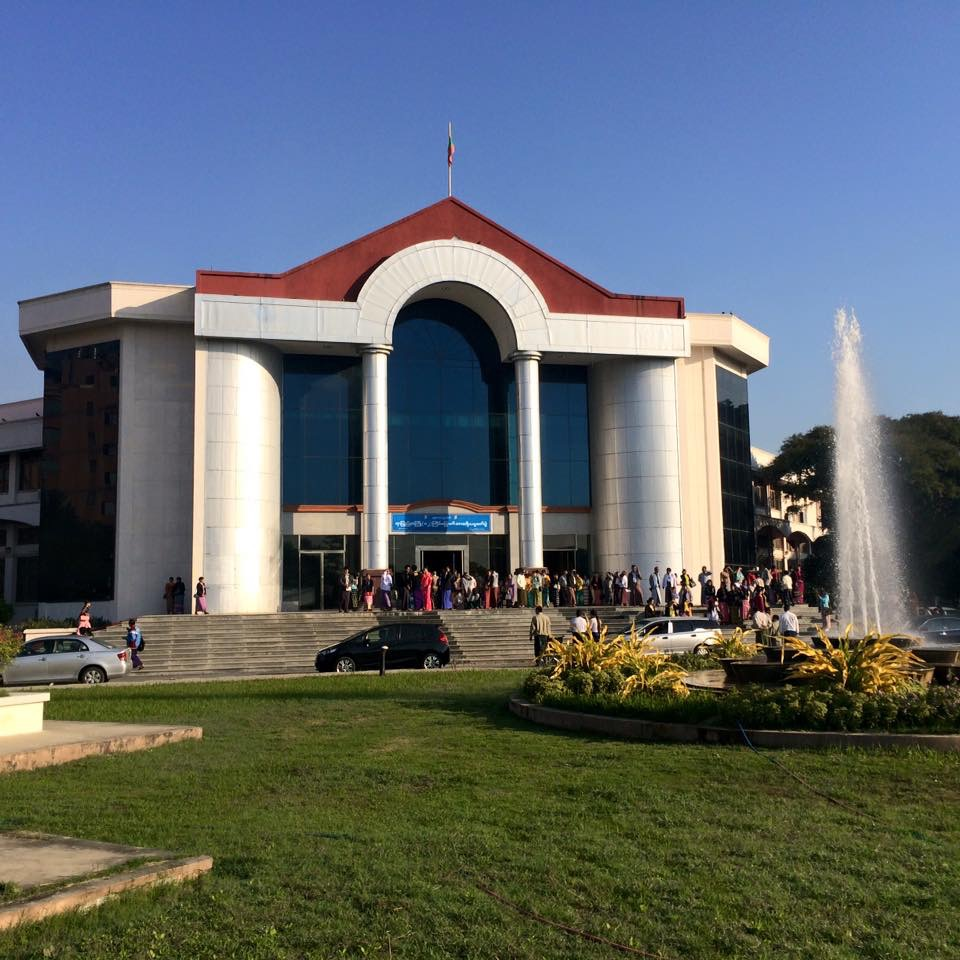
Convocation Hall

=== Expansion ===
In 1958, it became an independent university and the only university in Upper Myanmar. Regional colleges like Magwe College, Taunggyi College, Myitkyina College, and Shwebo College became affiliate colleges under Mandalay University.

Per the University Education Act of 1964, which promulgated establishment of specialised universities in Myanmar, Mandalay University's focus was shifted to offer liberal arts, sciences and law degrees only. The university's Faculty of Medicine was carved out to create Institute of Medicine, Mandalay. In 1978, it was renamed Mandalay Arts and Science University (MASU) (Burmese: မန္တလေး ဝိဇ္ဇာ သိပ္ပံ တက္ကသိုလ်). It again became Mandalay University in 1988 although the university's educational focus remains liberal arts, sciences and law.

=== Recent history ===
The Ministry of Education announced that according to a survey conducted by the National Education Policy Commission, Mandalay University was ranked first among arts and science universities across Myanmar in 2017. The assessments evaluated the quality of the universities' research, training, student wellness, quality of faculty and management.

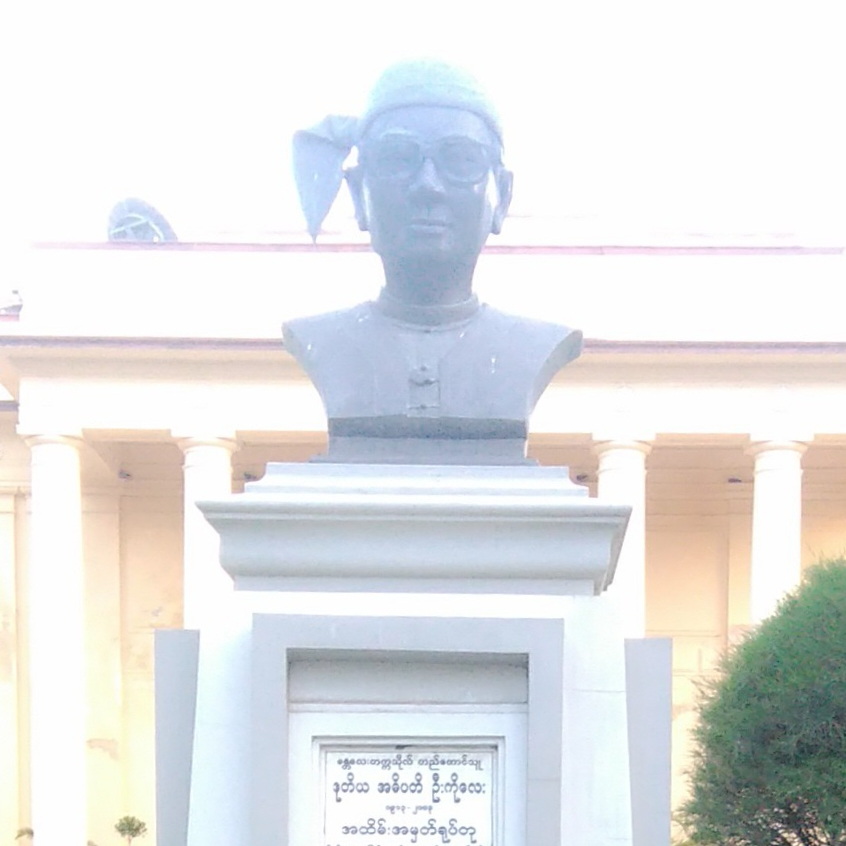
Statute of U Ko Lay who was the founder of the university

== 2025 fire ==
On 28 March 2025, the university was heavily damaged by a fire and building collapses after a violent earthquake struck Myanmar. The fire started at the university's main building after the earthquake caused a short circuit in electrical wiring. The fire caused the main building as well as some other buildings to collapse and also caused significant damage to other campus buildings. The 280,940 answer sheets of the 2024-2025 matriculation examination held at the main building were destroyed. The fire started while approximately 267 teachers and examiners were grading the answer sheets of 62,954 students. There were casualties, but none have confirmed the exact amount.

== Departments ==
With 19 main and one supporting academic departments, University of Mandalay covers all the major subjects in arts, sciences, law.

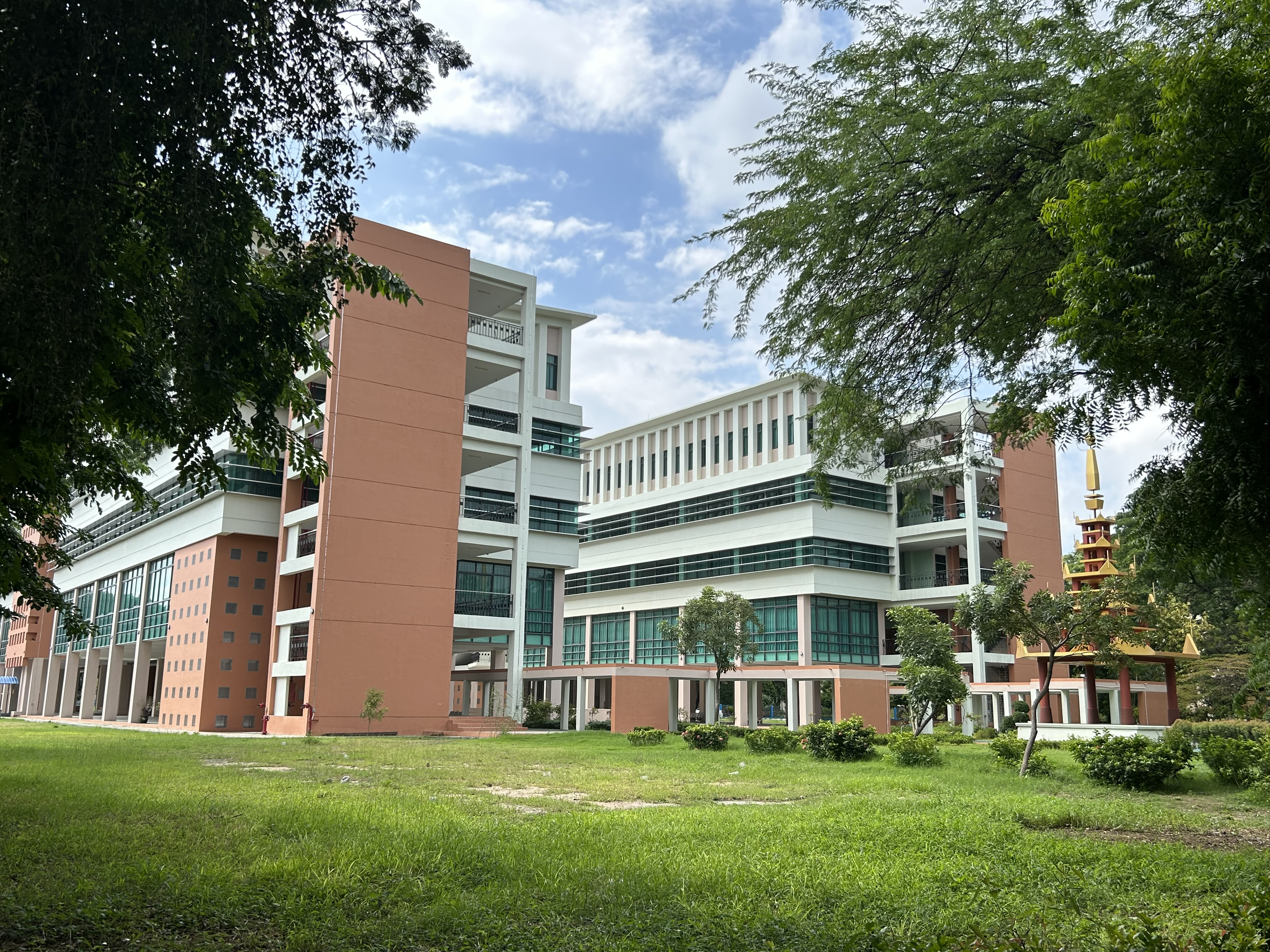
The new academic building in 2023

=== Main departments ===
- Department of Anthropology
- Department of Archaeology
- Department of Botany
- Department of Chemistry
- Department of Computer Studies
- Department of English
- Department of Geography and Environmental Studies
- Department of Geology
- Department of History and Cultural Heritage Tourism
- Department of Industrial Chemistry
- Department of International Relations
- Department of Law
- Department of Mathematics
- Department of Myanmar
- Department of Oriental Studies
- Department of Philosophy
- Department of Physics
- Department of Psychology
- Department of Zoology

=== Supporting departments ===
- Department of Economics

=== Research departments ===
- University Research Centre (URC)

== Programmes ==
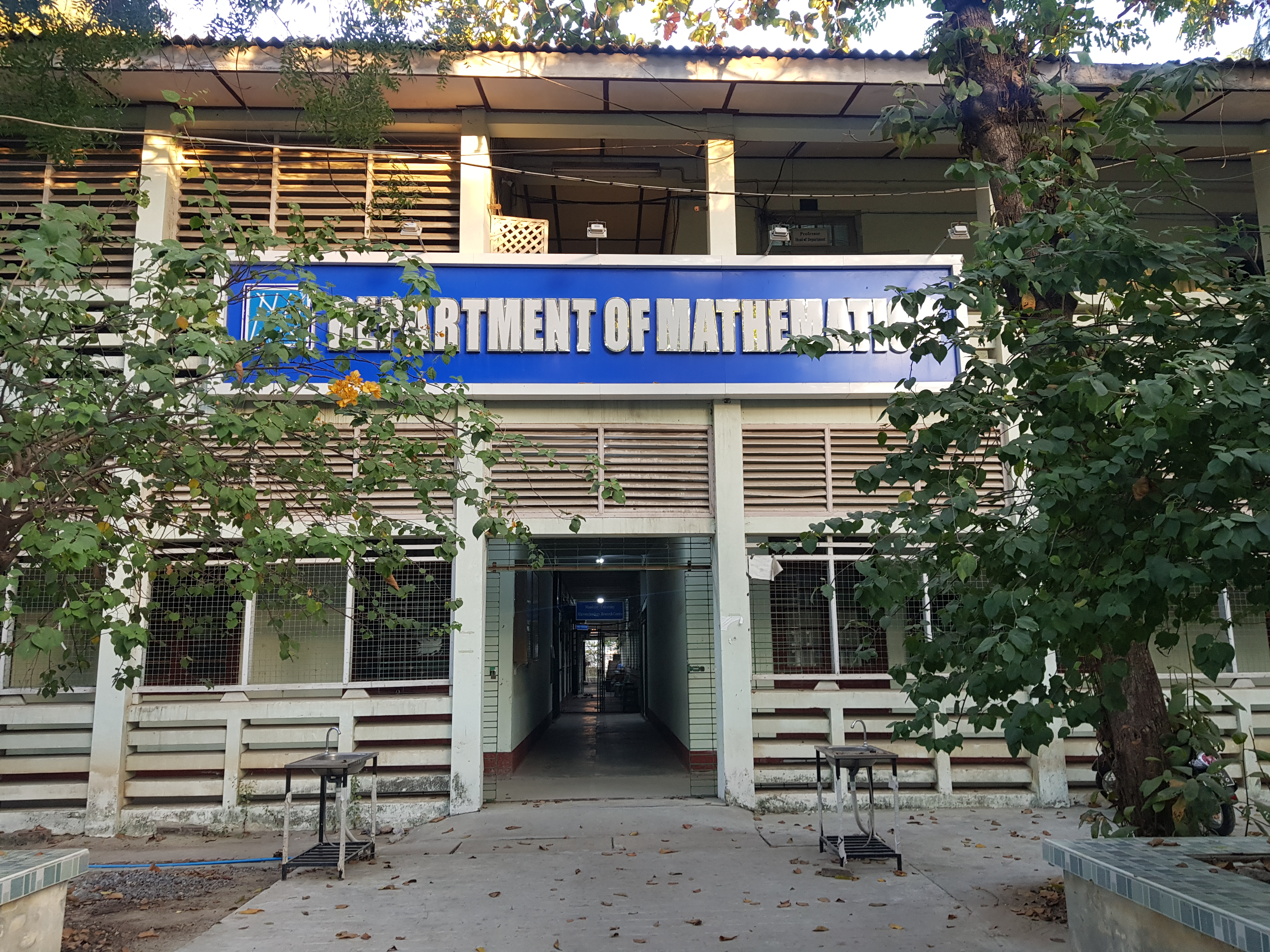
Department of Mathematics

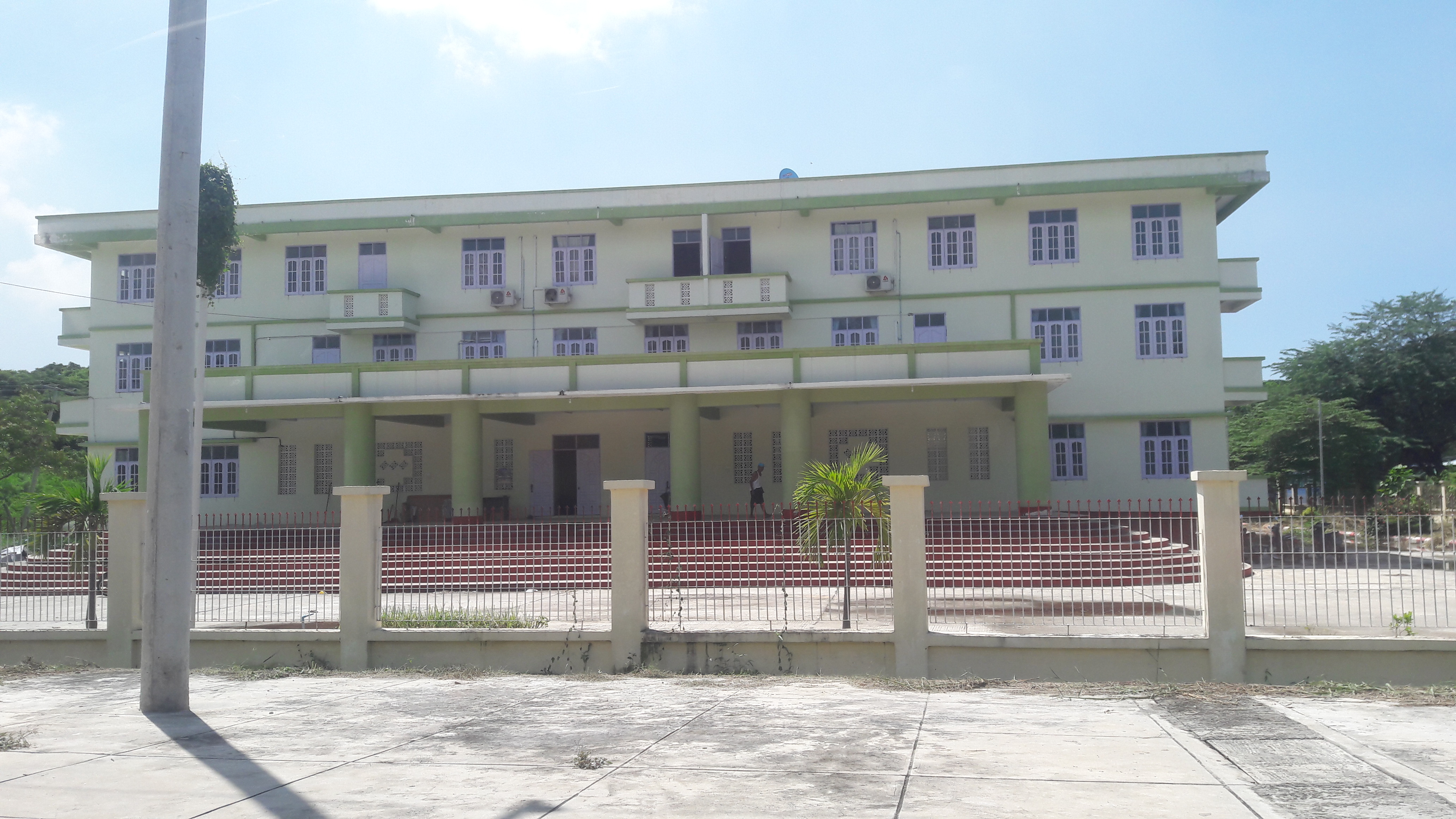
Guest Hostel for foreign delegates and lecturers

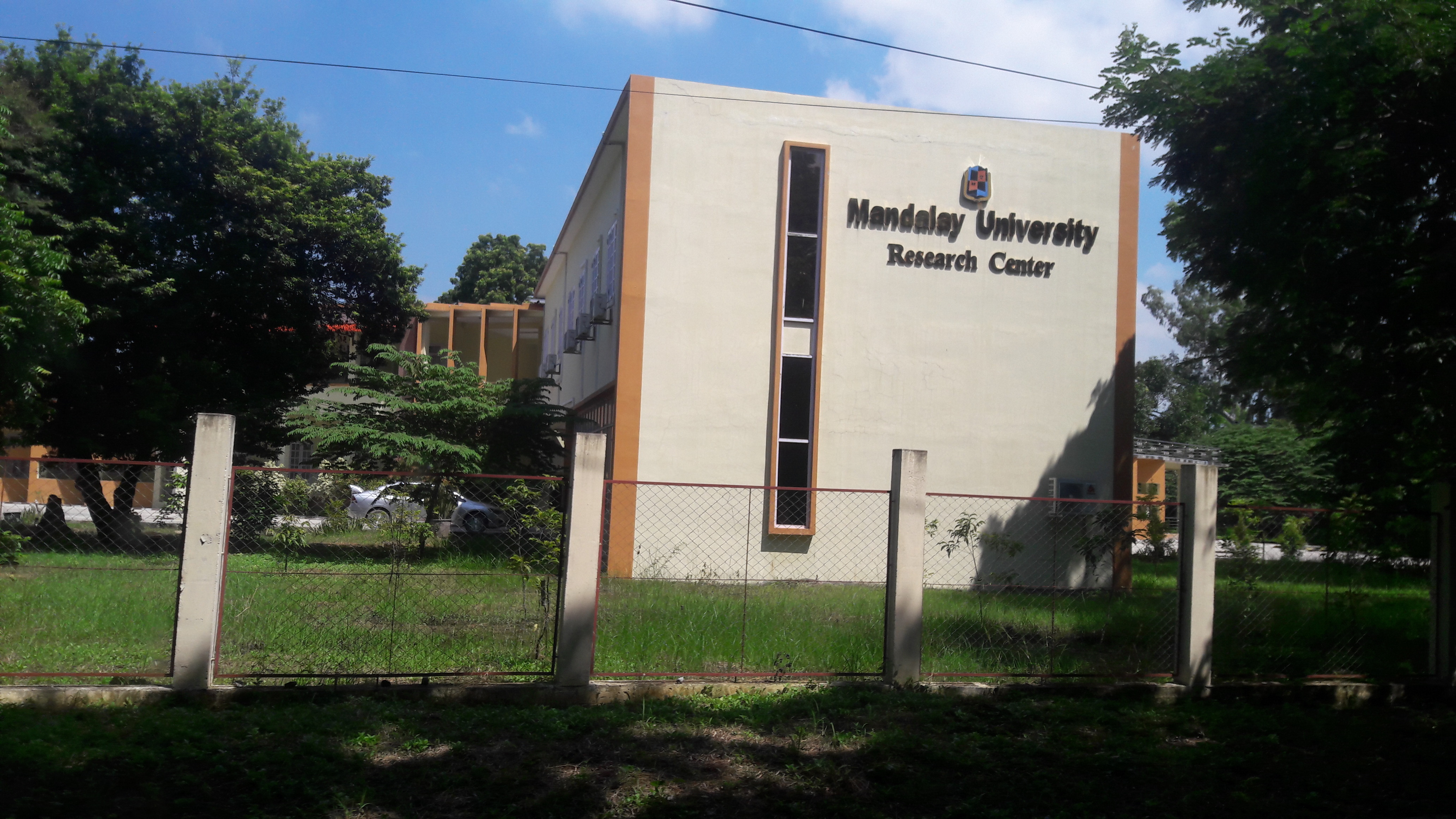
Mandalay University Research Centre

University of Mandalay offers undergraduate and postgraduate degree programmes. The undergraduate (Bachelor's) programmes are subdivided into three categories: Liberal Arts (B.A.), Sciences (BSc), and Law(LL.B). The choice of different fields of learning takes place in upper secondary school where students choose particular subjects directed towards their tertiary education. Postgraduate degrees are separated into three groups: Doctorates, Master's, and diplomas. Although Mandalay University used to no longer offer the undergraduate degrees owing to the uprising in 1996, it now was reopened for the undergraduate degree courses with the name of Center of Excellence (COE) in 2014 and accepted only 50 selectively excellent students for each field of studies. (Although undergraduate and postgraduate programmes are still available to current days, the recognition of status of international COE of the university has been discontinued.)

Programme	Bachelor's	Master's	Postgraduate	Doctorate	Diploma
Anthropology	BA	MA	MRes	PhD	-
Archaeology	BA	MA	MRes	PhD	-
Myanmar	BA	MA	MRes	PhD	-
English	BA	MA	MRes	PhD	Diploma in English Language Teaching, Diploma in English Language Proficiency
International Relations	BA	MA	MRes	PhD	Diploma in International Relations
Political Science	BA	MA, Master of Political Studies (MPols)	MRes	PhD	Diploma in Political Science
Geography	BA	MA	MRes	PhD	Diploma in Geographic Information System
History	BA	MA	MRes	PhD	-
Philosophy	BA	MA	MRes	PhD	Diploma in Philosophy
Psychology	BA	MA	MRes	PhD	Diploma in Applied Psychology
Oriental Studies	BA	MA	MRes	PhD	Diploma in Oriental Studies
Law	LLB	LLM	MRes	PhD	Diploma in International Law, Diploma in Business Law
Myanmar Studies	BA	MA		PhD	-
Environmental Studies	BA	MA		PhD	-
Economics	Minor courses for international relations, political science, and law students				Diploma in Business Studies, Advanced Diploma in Business Studies
Botany	BSc	MSc	MRes	PhD	-
Chemistry	BSc	MSc	MRes	PhD	-
Industrial Chemistry	BSc	MSc	MRes	PhD	-
Computer Science	BSc	MSc	MRes	PhD	-
Mathematics	BSc	MSc	MRes	PhD	-
Physics	BSc	MSc	MRes	PhD	-
Nuclear Physics		MSc	MRes	PhD	-
Zoology	BSc	MSc	MRes	PhD	-
Geology	BSc	MSc	MRes	PhD	-
Microbiology	BSc	MSc	MRes	PhD	-
Biochemistry	BSc	MSc	MRes	PhD	-
Master of Business Administration	-	MBA			-
Public Administration	-	MPA			-
Tourism Studies and Management					Diploma in Tourism Studies and Management

== International collaboration ==
1. Cologne University, Germany (10-8-2013)
2. Meijo University, Japan (14-11-2013)
3. National University of Singapore, Singapore (19-2-2014)
4. Singapore Management University, Singapore (19-2-2014)
5. Dongguk University, Korea (15-3-2014)
6. King Mongkut's University of Technology Thonburi, Thailand (22-5-2014)
7. University of New South Wales, Faculty of Law, Australia (29-5-2014)
8. Across Borders Southeast Asia Community Legal Education (Thailand) (10-7-2014)
9. University of Oxford, Department of Earth Sciences, United Kingdom (17-7-2014)
10. Yokohama National University, Japan (30-7-2014)
11. Gifu University, Japan (25-8-2014)
12. Zurich University, Switzerland (19-11-2014)
13. Suranaree University of Technology, Thailand (18-12-2014)
14. Northern Illinois University, United States (13-2-2015)
15. Suratthani Rajabhat University, Thailand (28-2-2015)
16. Technical University of Munich, Germany (9-3-2015)
17. Chiang Mai University, Thailand (6-4-2015)
18. Universitatt Zu Berlin, Institute of Asian and African Studies, Germany (19-4-2015)
19. Centre for Geogenetics, Natural History Museum of Denmark, University of Copenhagen, Denmark (24-6-2015)
20. Faculty of Science, Prince of Songkla University, Thailand (5-9-2015)
21. The Board of Trustees of the Royal Botanic Gardens, Kew (RBG Kew), United Kingdom (22-9-2015)
22. University of Florence, Italy (31-10-2015)
23. University of California, Riverside, United States (16-2-2016)
24. Yunnan University, China (8-3-2016)
25. National Chi Nan University, China (27-5-2016)
26. University of Natural Resources and Life Sciences, Vienna, Austria (14-6-2016)
27. National Astronomical Research Institute of Thailand (15-6-2016)
28. Central European University, Hungary (23-8-2016)
29. Bard College, United States (23-11-2016)
30. Technical University of Dortmund, Germany (2-1-2017)
31. Mae Fah Luang University, Thailand (28-6-2017)
32. Busan University of Foreign Studies, Korea (1-9-2017)
33. Sirindhorn International Institute of Technology, Thammasat University Thailand (27-12-2017)
34. Baoshan University, China (3-1-2018)
35. Lund University, Sweden (5-3-2018)
36. Uppsala University, Sweden (9-16-2018)

=== CHINLONE ===
Mandalay University is partner of the "CHINLONE – Connecting Higher Education Institutions for a new leadership on National Education" project. CHINLONE is a three-year (2017-2020) international project in the field of Higher Education funded by the European Union in the frame of the Erasmus+ Capacity Building Key Action 2. The project is coordinated by the University of Bologna (Italy).

CHINLONE's key aim is to contribute to the modernization and internationalization of Myanmar’s Higher Education System (HES), in order to facilitate the country’s transition toward a knowledge economy. The project aims to modernize Myanmar’s university management system by introducing internationally recognized higher education principles, strengthening faculty capacity to design programs focused on student learning outcomes through pilot curricula in select fields, and establishing or enhancing International Relations Offices to support internationalization and integration into global networks. It also seeks to promote future cooperation between European countries and Myanmar for academic exchange within a regulated framework.

The library system of UM consists of the Central Library and 21 separate departmental libraries. The combined holdings include approximately 186,000 books in English for all subjects and 94,000 books in Myanmar. A new library was completed in March 2013. An online library project was planned by the Open Society Foundations and American Universities.

=== History ===
Mandalay intermediate College Library was established along with the Mandalay Intermediate College in the year 1925. The college and library were badly damaged during World War II.

Th Library was started with a nucleus of 2,000 volumes on 17 July 1947. The library was housed on the second floor of the university main building in the chemical laboratory hall. Then the library was moved to the first floor of the main building.

As the collection increased, the space was found insufficient for the library. In 1995, the library was shifted to the first floor of Razak Hall. Razak Hall was named in honor of Saya Gyi U Razak who was a teacher and member of the national leader in the independence movement. Again in 1963, the library was moved to the second floor. In 1968, the whole building would be used for the library. In 2013, the library was moved to a new building on the campus. The Mandalay University Library is the largest academic library in Upper Myanmar.

== Notable alumni ==
=== Academia ===
- Tun Lwin
- Khin Maung Nyunt

=== Arts and literature ===
- Ludu Daw Amar
- Khin Maung Toe
- Khin Khin Htoo
- Ludu Sein Win
- Lay Phyu
- Nu Nu Yi
- Sai Htee Saing
- Tin Moe
- Lay Phyu

=== Business ===
- Aung Ko Win
- Peter Chou

=== Politics and government ===
- Aung Thaung
- Kyaw Nyein (minister of PaSaPaLa)
- Khin Maung Myint
- Tun Tun Hein
- Tun Tin
- Henry Van Thio
- Mya Aye
- Khin Maung Thein
- Sai Ohn Kyaw

== See also ==
- List of structures and infrastructure affected by the 2025 Myanmar earthquake
