= John Sydenham Furnivall =

British civil servant and scholar (1878–1960)

J.S. Furnivall
- Born: John Sydenham Furnivall; 14 February 1878; Great Bentley, Essex, England
- Died: 7 July 1960 (aged 82); Cambridge, England
- Other name: JS Furnivall
- Education: Trinity Hall, Cambridge University; Leiden University
- Occupations: Civil servant and Southeast Asian scholar
- Spouse: Margaret Ma Nyunt (1902-1920)
- Children: 2 daughters
- Awards: Commander of the Order of Orange-Nassau (1948); Sado Thiri Thudhamma of Burma (1949)

John Sydenham Furnivall (often cited as JS Furnivall or J.S. Furnivall) was a British-born colonial public servant and writer in Burma. He is credited with coining the concept of the plural society and had a noted career as an influential historian of Southeast Asia, particularly of the Dutch East Indies (modern-day Indonesia) and British Burma. He published several books over a long career, including the influential Colonial Policy and Practice and wrote for more than 20 major journals, although his work is now criticized as being Eurocentric and biased in favor of continued colonialism.

== Biography ==
Furnivall was born on 14 February 1878 in Great Bentley, Essex in England. For secondary schooling, he attended the Royal Medical Benevolent College (now Epsom College). He won a scholarship to Trinity Hall, Cambridge University in 1896. Four years later, in 1899, he obtained a degree in natural science.

In 1901, he joined the Indian Civil Service. He arrived in Burma on 16 December 1902 and took up the appointment of Assistant Commissioner and Settlement Officer. That same year, he wed Margaret Ma Nyunt, a Burmese and native of Taungoo. They had two daughters together, and remained married until her death in 1920.

In 1906, he founded the Burma Research Society, along with other Burmese scholars. Four years later, in 1910, the Society began publishing the Journal of the Burma Research Society. He was made Deputy Commissioner in 1915 and Commissioner of Land Settlement and Records in 1920. He retired from the ICS in 1923. During his career, he was an advocate of education for the native Burmese in order to prepare them for self-rule. In 1924, he founded the Burma Book Club and in 1928, the Burma Education Extension Association. Furnivall returned to England in 1931 to retire. From 1933 to 1935, he studied colonial administration at Leiden University. Following his retirement to Britain, Furnivall became Lecturer in Burmese Language, History and Law at Cambridge University (1936-1941). In 1940, together with C W Dunn, Furnivall published a Burmese-English Dictionary.

In 1942, he wrote Reconstruction in Burma which later became an important guideline for the newly independent Government of Burma in 1948. Although he was now retired, Furnivall returned to Burma in 1948, after he was appointed National Planning Adviser by U Nu's administration. That year, he also published his most well-known and influential book, Colonial Practice and Policy at the request of the British government, and argued that colonial policies had destroyed the social structure of Burma. Furnivall married an ethnic Shan woman and could speak Burmese fluently. He was upset by the oppression of the Burmese people. He loved to be addressed as “U Gyi” (“uncle” in Burmese). He was awarded the degree of D. Litt by Rangoon University in 1957. He remained in Burma until 1960, when along with many other expatriates, he was expelled by the new government of Ne Win.

He died on 7 July 1960 at Cambridge, before he could accept an offer by Rangoon University to teach there. His Times obituary was published on 12 July 1960.

== Political thought ==
In the 19th century it was believed that the correct sequence for preparing colonised people for independence was to first create the appropriate free-market institutions, in the belief that economic development, welfare and democracy, and thus true autonomy, would follow. Furnivall argued that the reverse was true: that it was necessary to begin with autonomy and that social welfare and development would follow. Furnivall's argument began with a model of the dysfunctional plural societies that often resulted from western colonial rule in the third world; arguing that economic development depends upon the prior achievement of welfare; and that only if affected peoples themselves had autonomy to develop their own criteria of welfare, would they be able to develop economically.

In his Colonial Policy and Practice, Furnivall postulated that there are three principles of economic progress:

The first principle is "survival of the cheapest":

Everyone would pay twopence rather than threepence for the same thing; that is rational, a matter of universal common sense....but at the same time, unless kept under control, it reduces costs by eliminating all human qualities that are not required to maintain life.

The second principle “is the desire of gain”:

Everyone ordinarily wants threepence instead of twopence....a principle that all accept as rational....It is a condition of economic progress, because it checks the tendency toward the degradation of human life inherent in the principle of survival of the cheapest....[But] the desire for gain tends to subordinate all social relationships to individual economic interest, and, unless kept under control, leads...to general impoverishment.

The third principle is “that progress is conditional on the observance of certain social obligations”:

The two basic principles of economic progress are supplemented by a third: that progress is conditional on the observance of certain social obligations. These obligations are not natural, and cannot be justified by universal common sense. They can indeed be justified rationally, but only to members of the same society.

== Books ==
Published works by J S Furnivall include:

- An Introduction to the Political Economy of Burma (Rangoon: Burma Book Club, 1931);
- Christianity and Buddhism in Burma: an address to the Rangoon Diocesan Council, August, 1929 (Rangoon: Peoples Literature Committee and House, 1930);
- An introduction to the history of Netherlands India, 1602-1836 (Rangoon : Published for the University of Rangoon by Burma Book Club, 1933);
- Wealth in Burma (1937);
- Netherlands India : a study of plural economy (Cambridge: Cambridge University Press, 1939);
- The fashioning of Leviathan (Rangoon: Zabu Meitswe Pitaka Press, 1939) - originally published in (1939) 29 Journal of the Burma Research Society 1-138;
- Progress and welfare in Southeast Asia: a comparison of colonial policy and practice (New York: Secretariat, Institute of Pacific Relations, 1941);
- Problems of education in Southeast Asia (New York: International Secretariat, Institute of Pacific Relations, 1942);
- Educational Progress in South East Asia (1943);
- Memorandum on reconstruction problems in Burma (New York: International Secretariat, Institute of Pacific Relations, 1944);
- The tropical Far East (London: Oxford University Press, 1945);
- Experiment in Independence (1947);
- Colonial Policy and Practice: A Comparative Study of Burma and Netherlands India (Cambridge: Cambridge University Press, 1948/ New York: New York University Press, 1948);
- The Government of Modern Burma (New York: International Secretariat, Institute of Pacific Relations, 1958);
- An introduction to the political economy of Burma (Rangoon: Peoples' Literature Committee and House, 1957) 3rd ed;
- The Government of Modern Burma (2d ed. with an appreciation by FN Trager and a supplement on the Ne Win administration by JS Thompson), (New York: Institute of Pacific Relations, 1960);
- Studies in the Economic and Social Development of the Netherlands East Indies. I. An Introductory Survey, 1815-1930;
- Studies in the Economic and Social Development of the Netherlands East Indies. IIb. An Introduction to the History of Netherlands India, 1602-1836;
- Studies in the Economic and Social Development of the Netherlands East Indies. III. State and Private Money Making;
- Studies in the Economic and Social Development of the Netherlands East Indies. IIIc. State Pawnshops in Netherlands India;
- Studies in the Economic and Social Development of the Netherlands East Indies. IVd. Fisheries in Netherlands India.

For an assessment of Furnivall’s impact on the study of Burma, see R H. Taylor, “An undeveloped state: the study of modern Burma's politics (Melbourne: Monash University's Centre of Southeast Asian Studies, Working Paper No 28, 1983).

== See also ==
- The World of Books
- Ganda Lawka

The papers of John Sydenham Furnivall are held at SOAS Archives.
