= Min Thu Wun =

Burmese poet (1909–2004)

- မင်းသုဝဏ်
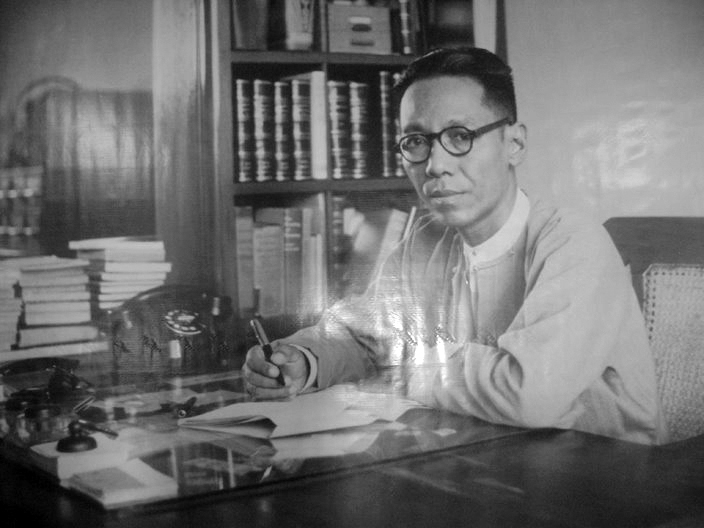

Member-elect of the National Convention for Kamayut Township
- Majority: 23,345 (76%)
- Preceded by: Constituency established
- Succeeded by: Constituency abolished

Personal details
- Born: Wun; 10 February 1909 Kungyangon, Hinthada District, Hanthawaddy Division, British Burma
- Died: 15 August 2004 (aged 95) Kamayut Township, Yangon, Myanmar
- Party: National League for Democracy
- Spouse: Kyi Kyi
- Children: Htin Kyaw
- Parent(s): Lwan Pin; Mi
- Education: Rangoon University; Oxford University
- Occupation: Writer
- Known for: His role in Khit-San Sarpay Movement

Thiri Pyanchi Min Thu Wun (Burmese: မင်းသုဝဏ်; 10 February 1909 – 15 August 2004) was a Burmese poet, writer and scholar who helped launch a new age literary movement called Khit-San (Testing the Times) in Burma. He is the father of Htin Kyaw, President of Myanmar from 2016 to 2018.

== Distinguished career ==
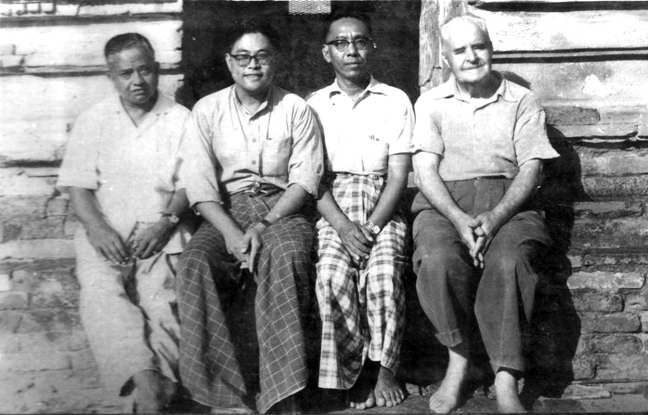
Min Thu Wun (third from the left)

Born Maung Wun at Kungyangon in Mon state in 1909, he was of Mon and Bamar (Burman) descent. He started writing poems at the age of 20 for Rangoon College (later Rangoon University) magazine. It was in university that he, along with the other students of Professor Pe Maung Tin – Theippan Maung Wa and Zawgyi, pioneered the Hkit san style of short stories and poems, published in the university magazine, and Ganda Lawka (World of Books) magazine which he edited, under the tutelage of J.S. Furnivall, founder of the Burma Research Society. The year 1934 saw the publication of Hkit san pon byin (Experimental Tales) – a collection of short stories to test the readers' reaction, written by Zawgyi, Min Thu Wun and Theippan Maung Wa, among others. The writing was distinct and novel in style, using shorter sentences and moving away from the traditional literary vocabulary.

In 1935 Min Thu Wun received his master's degree in Burmese literature. He went to study at Oxford University, and achieved a bachelor's degree in literature in 1939.

Whilst Theippan Maung Wa was famous for his prose, Min Thu Wun and Zawgyi were best known for their portrayal of the daily lives of ordinary people and appreciation of nature in their poems. Zawgyi became one of the most respected literary critic of Burma at the time, while Min Thu Wun, who would go on to win the Myanmar National Literary Award, became a renowned poet .

== Publications ==
1. Nursery Songs for Maung Khway – 13 songs in Burmese with music and English translations by Gordon H Luce of 60 years ago were reprinted in 2002.
2. Stories for Children – his translation of 26 stories for children from around the world from 1955 to 1961 were also collected into a book in 1965.

Min Thu Wun's prolific writings on literature, both classical and modern, in numerous articles were later collected into 3 important books.

1. Pan hnin pinzi – The Tree Trunk and the Blooms (1965)
2. Myanma sa Myanma hmu – Burmese Life and Letters (1965)
3. Pyinma ngokto – The Tough Tree Stump (1968)

Min Thu Wun explained in a book review the nature of "light" and "serious" literature. He went on to create the Burmese version of Braille for the blind. He also helped compile Mon – Burmese and Pali – Burmese dictionaries.

== Politics ==
In 1990 he was elected as a National League for Democracy (NLD) Member of Parliament, although he resigned 8 years later under pressure from the military regime. His work has also been banned from publication. A popular publication called Sapei Gya-ne (Literary Journal) was also blocked in its attempt to dedicate its June 1995 issue to Min Thu Wun. He died on 15 August 2004 at the age of 95.

== See also ==
- Literature of Burma
