= Kamayut District =

District in Yangon, Myanmar

Kamayut District ကမာရွတ်ခရိုင်
- District
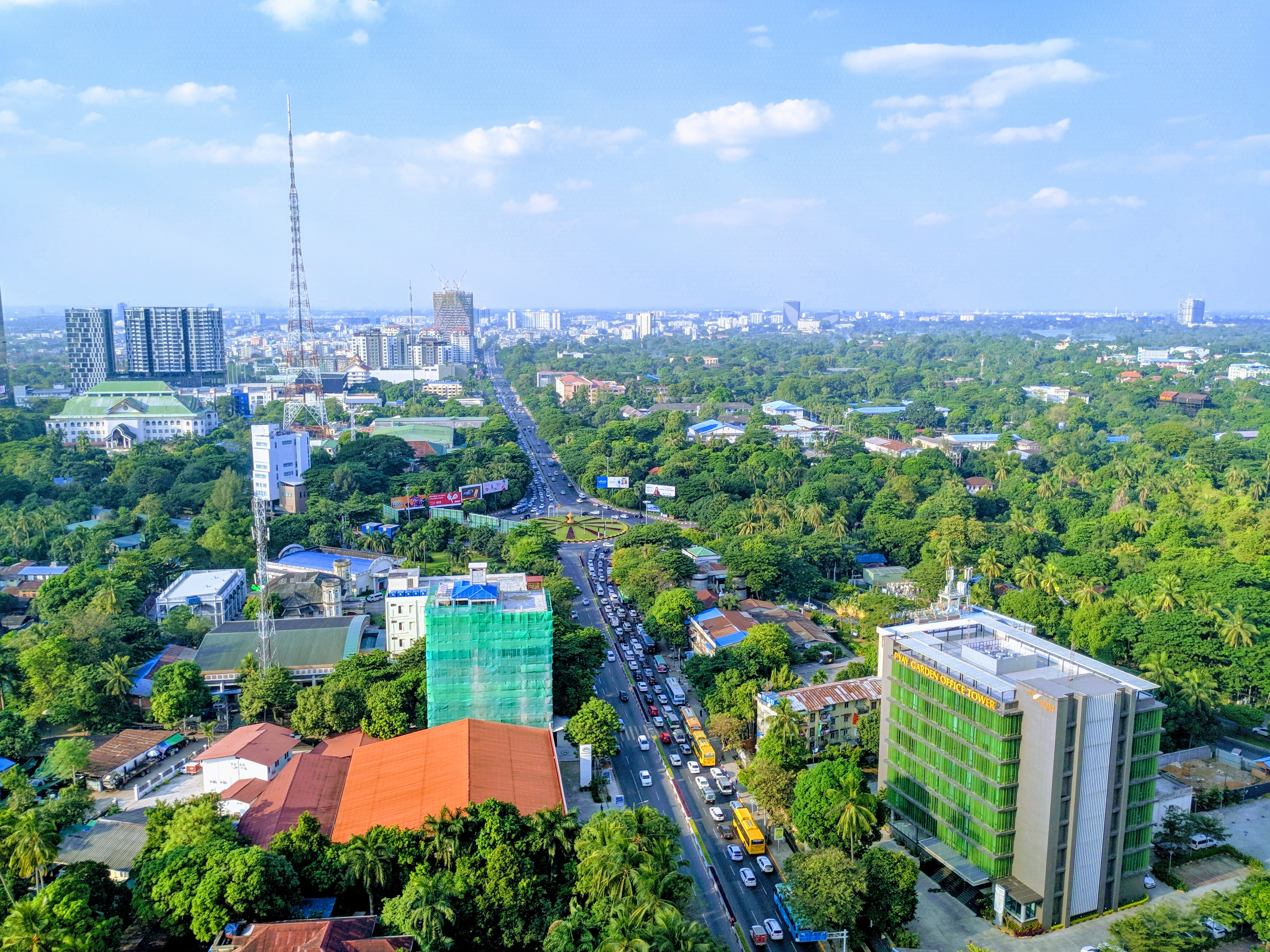
- Pyay Road, Kamayut Township

- Kamayut District in Yangon Region
- Coordinates: 16.811°N 96.144°E
- Country: Myanmar
- Region: Yangon Region
- City: Yangon
- Area code: +951

Kamayut District (Burmese: ကမာရွတ်ခရိုင်) is a district in Yangon Region, Myanmar. It is a township of Yangon and contains two townships. The district was created in 2022, being one of the new districts created from the former West Yangon District.

== Administration ==
The district has two townships- Kamayut Township and Bahan Township. The Kamayut Township Court was upgraded to a district-level court. The district connects the northwest and northeast portions of Yangon between Inya Lake to the north and the People's Square and Park to its south.

In 2023, the State Administration Council rolled out a trial of electronic voting in the district as they attempted to organise elections.

== Notable Sites ==
The home where former State Counsellor Aung San Suu Kyi remained in house arrest for two decades is located in the district. The District court attempted to auction the property after the 2021 Myanmar coup d'etat multiple times and received no bidders. Her father Aung San's colonial-era villa, protected as part of the Bogyoke Aung San Museum, is also in Bahan.

Bahan is also one of the most prosperous townships in Yangon. Shwetaunggya (formerly, Golden Valley), Sayarsan Road and Inya Myaing are three of Yangon's most exclusive neighbourhoods.

Kamayut is the "college town" of the Yangon. Pyay Road, which cuts across the township, is lined with many education and media related institutions such as the Myanmar Radio and Television headquarters, Yangon University, the University of Medicine 1, Yangon, the Yangon Institute of Economics, the Yangon Institute of Education and affiliated TTC and University of Distance Education, Yangon are all located in the township.

== See also ==
- List of districts and neighborhoods of Yangon
