= Ye Lwin (musician) =

Burmese musician (1947–2018)

Ye Lwin ရဲလွင်
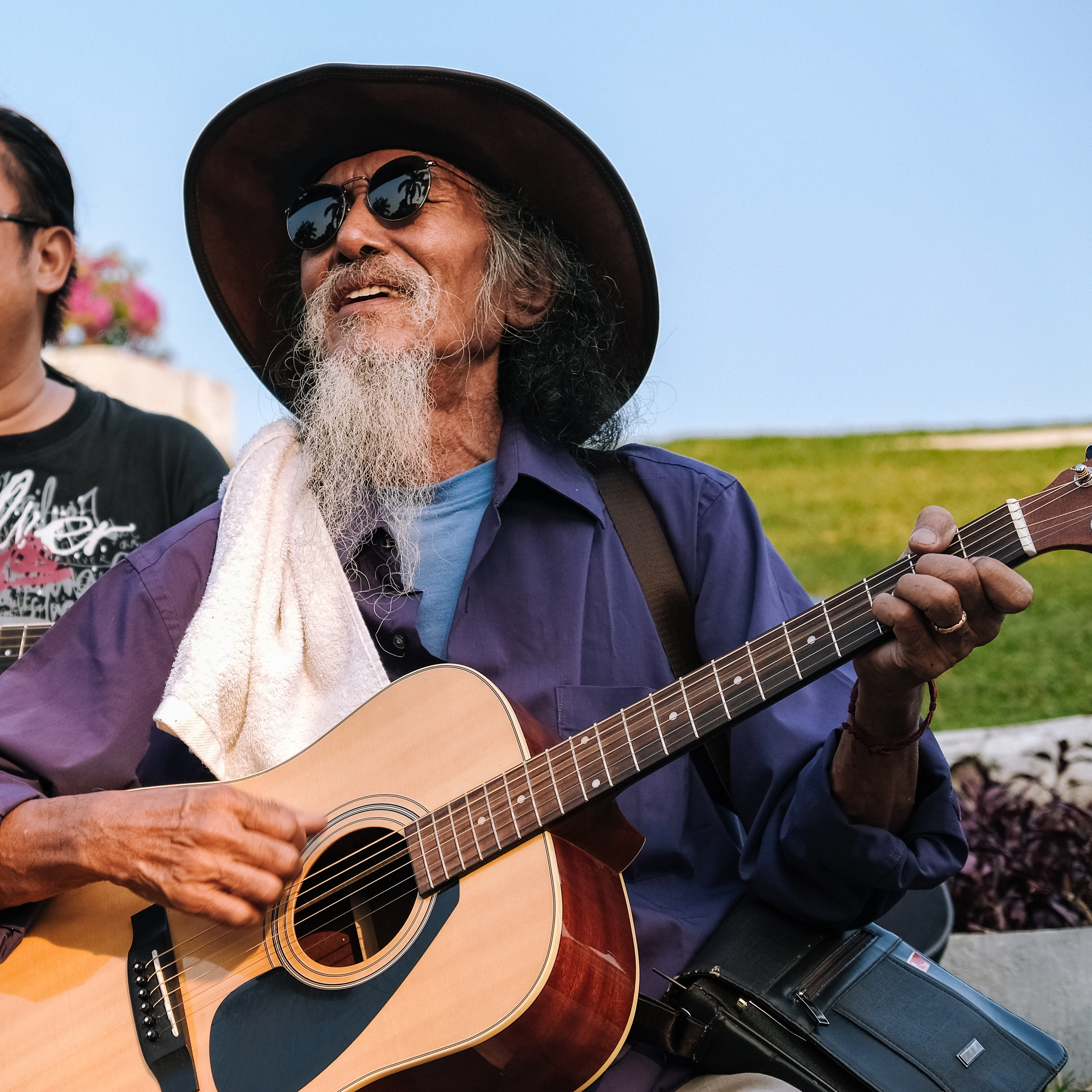

Background information
- Born: December 1947; Paungde, Pegu Division, British Burma (now Myanmar)
- Died: 10 July 2018 (aged 70) Yangon
- Genres: Burmese pop; Country music; Burmese classic
- Occupations: Musician; Singer-songwriter; Guitarist; Peace activist
- Instruments: guitar, vocal
- Years active: 1974–2018

Ye Lwin (Burmese: ရဲလွင်; December 1947 – 10 July 2018) was a prominent Burmese musician, guitarist and peace activist. He was the longtime bass guitarist and singer of the Mizzima Wave (မဇ္ဈိမလှိုင်း) band. He is one of activist musicians in the peace movement of Myanmar.

== Early life and education ==
He was born in December 1947 in Paungde, Bago Region, British Burma (now Myanmar). He grew up in a musical, Christian family. He was the eight son of ten siblings. He started enroll at Rangoon Institute of Technology (RIT) in 1968, and dropped out on 3rd year.

== Career ==
He started out on his music career in 1974 as played the bass guitar for "E-machine" music band while still a university student. In 1984, he co-founded "Mizzima Wave", the influential Myanmar classic rock band, with his fellow musician Khin Maung Toe, songwriter Ko Ne Win and Ko Maung Maung (Azali). The band had great success with their original songs in the 1980s and the 1990s. He played the bass guitar for the band. He created many own original tunes, and one of his song "Pan Kayan Pya " (Violet Flower) was most popular and banned from 1962 to 1988, is striking a chord with audiences in unexpected venues. And their desire to help war victims and bring an end to conflict in war-torn areas has earned them respect, and often large donations, from their fans.

In 2012, he founded "Panyelann" (Path of Flowers) are a group of charity buskers who have been entertaining customers with their music. Since May 2012 while raising funds for the people in Kachin State. He wrote about 200 songs in his music life.

== Activism and movements ==
Ye Lwin was one of the student activist in RIT students group. He had led in 1976 Hmaing Yar Pyae uprising with Khin Maung Toe. He was banned singer and his songs banned by government under Burma Socialist Programme Party.

During the 2007 Saffron Revolution when Buddhist monks took to the streets to defy the then-ruling military government, Ye Lwin joined the nonviolent protests, reciting verses from the Metta Sutta (loving kindness). When the protest was crushed, he was arrested and detained for months. As a punishment, the then government refused to allow his name to appear in public, even on album jackets.

His peace activism began in 2012, he took to peace activism with a group of young musicians, launching weekly fundraising gigs held at many of Yangon's ubiquitous teashops in 2012. Under the motto "People helping people", Panyelann (Flower's Path) was initially formed to help the tens of thousands of civilians victimized by the raging war between government troops and the Kachin Independence Army (KIA) in Kachin State, northernmost Myanmar.

== Religion ==
Ye Lwin was raised in a Christian family and grew up sing and playing in Church. During his early adult years Ye Lwin lost faith and stopped going to church. Years later Ye Lwin was inspired by Paragu's writing and slowly became a Buddhist and adopted a vegetarian diet. Ye Lwin's Buddhist faith had a strong impact on his pacifist outlook and music.

== Death ==
On 18 June 2018, Ye Lwin was brought to hospital for liver cancer, and died there on 10 July 2018, around 4:05 pm and was buried at Yayway Cemetery on 14 July 2018.
