= Yayway Cemetery =

Cemetery in North Okkalapa Township, East Yangon District, Myanma

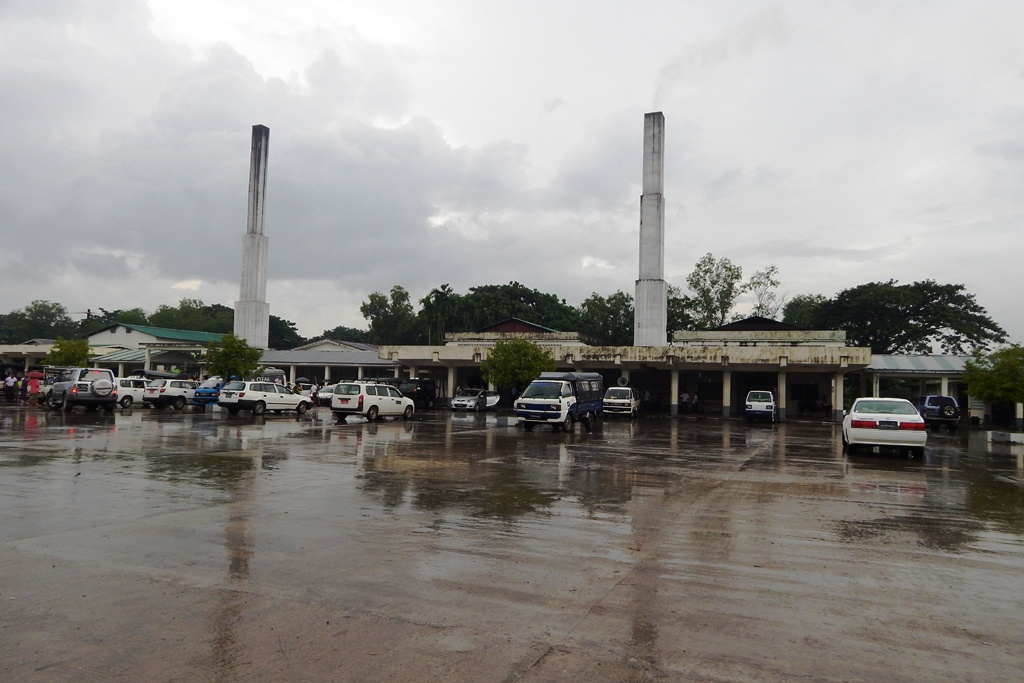
- Interactive map of Yayway Cemetery

Details
- Location: North Okkalapa Township, Yangon
- Country: Myanmar
- Coordinates: 16.93233°N 96.16585°E
- Type: Public

Yayway Cemetery (Burmese: ရေဝေးသုသာန်, also spelt Yeway Cemetery) is a cemetery located in North Okkalapa Township, Yangon, Myanmar. The cemetery is the final resting place of many prominent Burmese. The cemetery is maintained by the Yangon City Development Committee's environmental maintenance department. Yayway Cemetery also consists of various ethnic and religious sections, including those of the Burmese Indians, Sino-Burmese (Hakka, Cantonese, Hokkien, and Yunnanese), Karen, Japanese, Baháʼís, Hindus, Christians, Muslims, Parsis, and Jews.

== History ==
In the mid-1990s, the State Law and Order Restoration Council, the ruling junta, forcibly closed down and relocated historic cemeteries lying near the city center of Yangon. One of the biggest was Kyandaw Cemetery (in Kamayut Township), which was relocated to suburbs in 1996 to 1997, and its former site was redeveloped as the Yangon Drugs Elimination Museum. Descendants of the interred were given one month's notice to move the remains for reburial. Similarly, that year, the Nine Mile Cemetery (ကိုးမိုင်သင်္ချိုင်း), an ethnic Chinese cemetery was demolished and remains were relocated to Yayway Cemetery. The interred remains from these cemetery relocation projects were reburied at Yayway Cemetery, located on the outskirts of the city.

Today, Yayway Cemetery is the busiest in the Yangon area, handling the highest volume of cremations (70 to 100 per day).

== Notable burials and cremations ==
- Ant Gyi
- Chit Maung
- Dwe
- Gita Lulin U Ko Ko
- Journal Kyaw Ma Ma Lay
- Ko Ni
- Khin Yu May
- Khun Sa
- Ma Ma Lay
- Mahn Thet San
- Min Theinkha
- Min Thway
- Nat Nwe
- Nay Win Maung
- Ni Ko Ye
- Nwam Jar Thaing
- Ohn Myint
- Paragu
- Sai Htee Saing
- Shwe Ohn
- Soe Win
- U Lwin
- Win Tin
- Ye Lwin
