= NWE =

Nwe or NWE may refer to:

- Nwe (surname)
- Ngwe language (ISO 639-3 code: new)
- Nordhausen-Wernigerode Railway Company (German: Nordhausen-Wernigeroder Eisenbahn-Gesellschaft)
- North West England
