= Min Thein Kha =

Burmese writer (1939–2008)

- မင်းသိင်္ခ
- Born: Aung Htun; 25 June 1939; Rangoon, British Burma
- Died: 1 August 2008 (aged 69); Kamayut Township, Yangon, Myanmar
- Resting place: Yayway Cemetery, Yangon
- Education: St. Paul's High School; AV College; Astrological Research Project(India)(Ph.D)
- Occupations: Writer and astrologer
- Parents: San Shein (father); Tin Tin (mother)

Min Thein Kha (Burmese: မင်းသိင်္ခ, born Aye Nyunt; 25 June 1939 – 1 August 2008) was a prominent Burmese writer, astrologer and political prisoner. He began his literary career in 1976, adopting the pseudonym Min Theinkha, and wrote hundreds of novels and short stories throughout his career, including notable works such as Manusari, Ponna Ba Kun and Sanay Maung Maung. He is renowned for his series of detective novels set in Colonial Burma, where the protagonist, Sarpalin Hnin Maung, embodies a character archetype deeply influenced by Sherlock Holmes. He was also a well-known astrologer and later taught astrology from his compound in Yangon Region's Hmawbi Township.

== Early life ==
Min Thein Kha was born Aye Nyunt on 25 June 1939 in Kyaukmyaung, now part of Yangon's Tamwe Township, as the eldest of six children in a destitute family. His father is an Artist. He adopted the name Aung Htun when he began to attend school.

At the age of 15, he began writing short novels, using the pen name Aung Soe.

== Personal life ==
Min Thein Kha was married thrice, to two women. He married Aye Aye Shwe at the age of 18; the couple divorced during the same year, and remarried again in 1980 (Later divorced in 1988 detained by military). He married another woman after settling in Chauk; the couple had Min Thein Kha's only child, a son (born 1961).

== Politics ==
Min Thein Kha served in the Myanmar military for five years. After leaving armed forces, he later became involved in peace discussions aimed at resolving the country's political conflicts. When the peace process collapsed, he fled to an area controlled by the Communist Party and eventually became a communist comrade. Around 1965–1966, while carrying out a mission in Rangoon (Yangon), he was arrested by the military authorities and sentenced to six years in prison. After his release, he established himself as a successful writer and astrologer, becoming one of the most popular literary figures in Myanmar. During the 1988 nationwide pro-democracy uprising, he actively participated in demonstrations and delivered public speeches supporting democratic reform. Following the military crackdown, he was arrested again and sentenced to life imprisonment. In 1992, he was released under a government amnesty. He subsequently resumed his literary and public activities and remained an influential figure in Myanmar society until his death in 2008.

== Death ==
He died on 1 August 2008 at a private hospital in Kamayut Township in Yangon.His funeral attracted an exceptionally large crowd and is widely regarded as one of the largest and most well-attended funerals in the history of Myanmar's literary and astrological communities, reflecting the immense respect and admiration he commanded among the public.
