= Kyandaw Cemetery =

Former cemetery in Rangoon, East Yangon District, Myanmar

- Interactive map of Kyandaw Cemetery

Details
- Closed: 1996–1997
- Location: Kamayut Township, Yangon
- Country: Myanmar
- Coordinates: 16.815641°N 96.131456°E

Kyandaw Cemetery (Burmese: ကြံတောသုသာန်), located in Kamayut Township, was Yangon's largest cemetery before it was demolished between 1996 and 1997 for redevelopment as the Yangon Drugs Elimination Museum. The relocation of graves was ordered by the Burmese government in December 1996. Descendants of the interred were given one month's notice to move the remains for reburial in cemeteries on Yangon's outskirts, at Yayway Cemetery and at Hteinbin Cemetery in Hlaingthaya Township. Kyandaw Cemetery occupied a 50 acres (20 ha) expanse of land about .5 miles (0.80 km) away from Yangon University. It was established during the colonial era. Kyandaw Cemetery was the city's common burial ground for Burmese Buddhists, but also included Christian, Chinese, Hindu and Islamic cemeteries. The Hindu section of the cemetery covered 1.6 hectares (4.0 acres).

In 1991, the Yangon City Corporation (now the Yangon City Development Committee) ordered the relocation of graves at St. John's Cantonment Cemetery to Kyandaw. The graves included those of British soldiers. In 1994, the army moved the remains of the interred from Tamwe Cemetery to Kyandaw to build a supermarket.

== Notable burials ==
- Bo Aung Gyaw – Rangoon University student shot by British military police during a demonstration on 20 December 1938
- U Nu – Burmese prime minister
- Several of the Thirty Comrades
- Chit Maung
- Journalgyaw Ma Ma Lay
- Khin May Than – Ne Win's wife
- 8888 Uprising demonstrators
