= Soe Win (bodyguard) =

Bodyguard of Aung San Suu Kyi

U Soe Win
- ဦးစိုးဝင်း
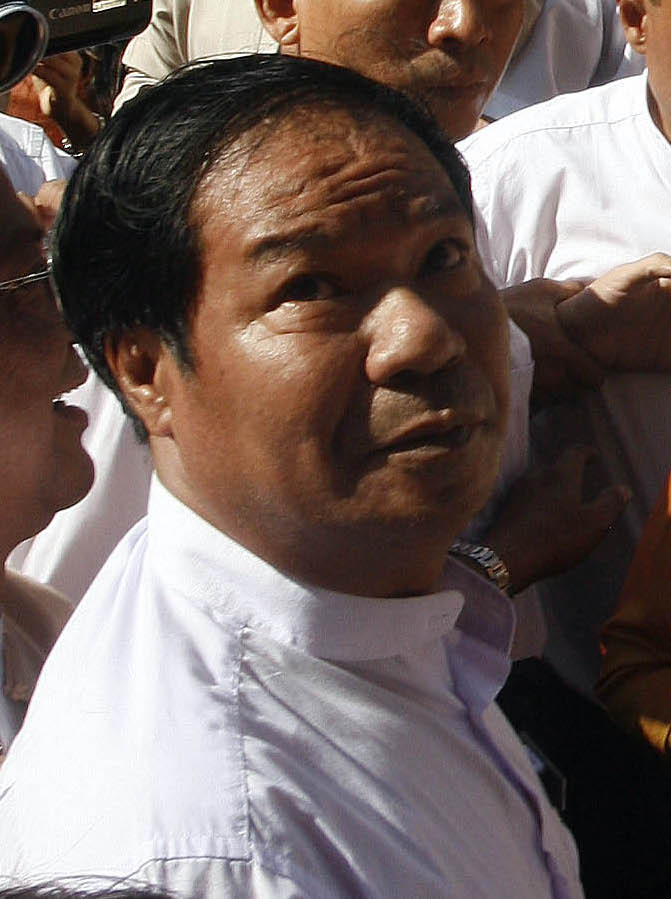
- Soe Win in 2012
- Born: 1961; Yangon, Myanmar
- Died: July 25, 2020 (aged 58–59); Lewe, Myanmar
- Resting place: Yayway Cemetery, Yangon
- Occupations: Bodyguard, close confidant of Aung San Suu Kyi
- Spouse: Myint Myint Thein

U Soe Win (ဦးစိုးဝင်း; 1961 – 25 July 2020), also known as U Soe, was the bodyguard and close confidant of the State Counsellor of Myanmar Aung San Suu Kyi. He has served Aung Sann Suu Kyi since the early days of her democracy movement until she transitioned to lead the current government. Soe Win served as Aung San Suu Kyi's bodyguard on the 2010 and 2015 general election campaigns. Due to his outstanding character and loyalty, Aung San Suu Kyi even asked if he could be made an honorary member of parliament, but he refused. He has been regarded as a trusted ally of Aung San Suu Kyi's and dubbed as her "right-hand-person" by many.

== Biography ==
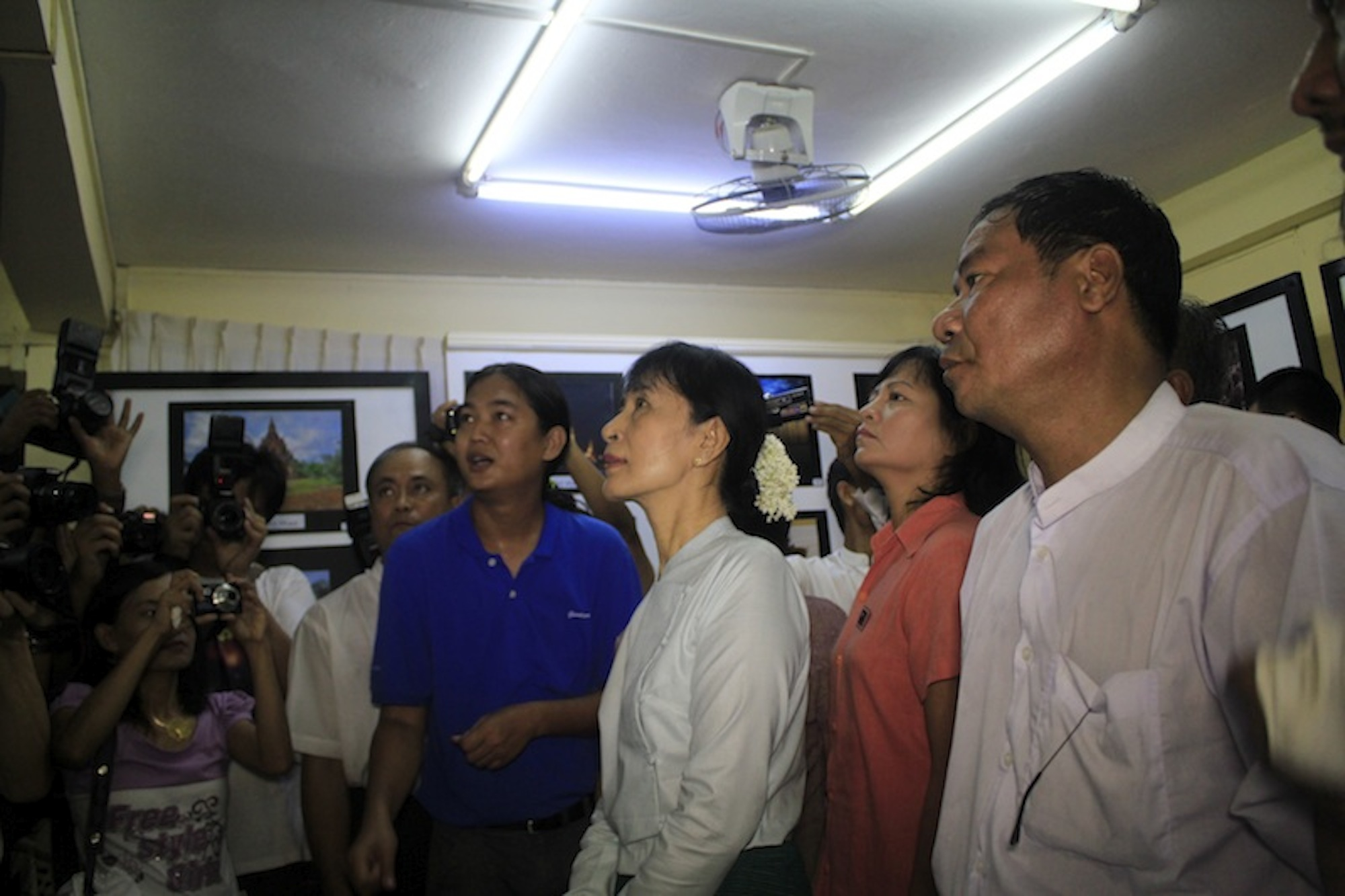
Soe Win (R), is seen with Aung San Suu Kyi at NLD headquarter on 23 May 2011 in Yangon, Myanmar.

Before becoming a security guard he was a taxi driver and, though keeping a low profile over the years. He had protected Aung San Suu Kyi for some 30 years, committing himself to working with the NLD in 1990. In 1995, he became a member of the Three Colors. He was always seen by her side, chaperoning and protecting her from crowds and possible security threats. He died at age 59 of a heart attack on 25 July 2020. His funeral held on 29 July at Yayway Cemetery. His final journey was accompanied by government officials, political colleagues and hundreds of people.
