= Nay Win Maung =

Burmese democracy activist

- နေဝင်းမောင်
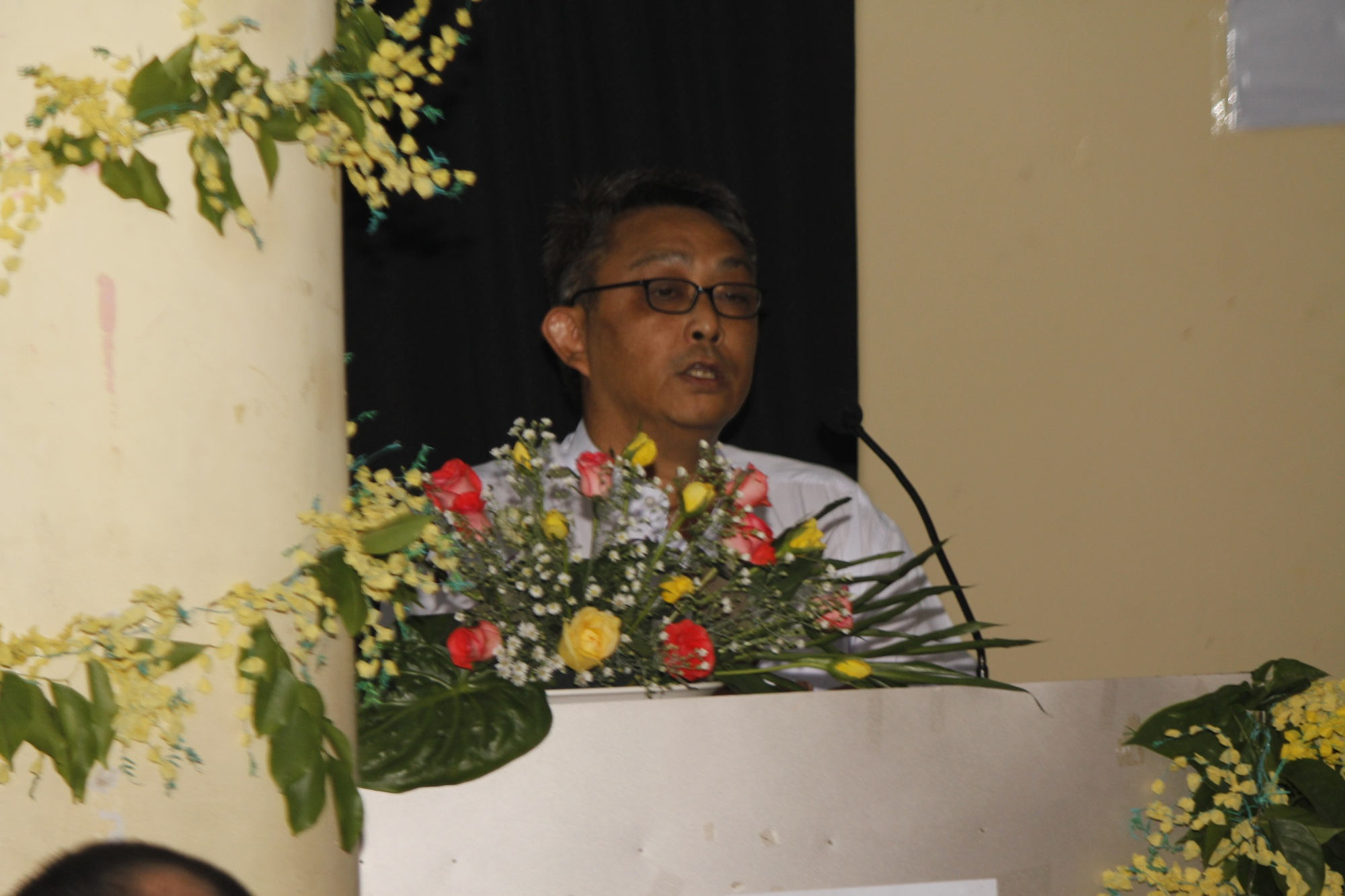
- Nay Win Maung speaks at a graduation ceremony in Yangon, Myanmar on April 9, 2011
- Born: June 30, 1962; Maymyo, Burma
- Died: January 1, 2012 (aged 49); Yangon, Myanmar
- Resting place: Yayway Cemetery, Yangon; 16.93233°N 96.16585°E
- Other names: Ko Pauk, Pauk Pauk
- Education: Institute of Medicine 1, Rangoon
- Known for: Founder of Living Colour Media Group and Myanmar Egress think-tank
- Spouse: Win Kalayar Swe
- Children: 4 children
- Parent(s): Than Maung; Yin Yin

Nay Win Maung (Burmese: နေဝင်းမောင်; June 30, 1962 – January 1, 2012) was a Burmese physician, businessman and pro-democracy activist.

== Life and career ==
Maung advocated a conciliatory approach toward Myanmar's ruling military junta, which seized power in 1988. Maung argued that Burma could be moved towards democratization by working directly with the country's generals, rather than confronting them. Maung sometimes took political positions which proved controversial among Burma's opposition leaders, who often viewed his ties to the military government with suspicion. He stated that Aung San Suu Kyi should accept a new constitution written by the military as a token of goodwill. He believed that Aung San Suu Kyi's National League for Democracy (NLD) should only contest half the parliamentary seats in the 2010 general election, arguing that a landslide win for the NLD would scare the Burmese rulers into holding onto power. However, Maung heavily criticized the generals for rigging the 2010 general election when the extent of voter fraud became known. (The NLD ultimately boycotted the election).

Maung grew up in Maymyo (also called Pyin U Lwin), where his parents were history department faculty members at the Defence Services Academy. From the 7th to 10th standards, he was selected as a Luyaygyun (လူရည်ချွန်), a nationally recognized well-rounded student. Maung attended a regional college, where he majored in Biology, before he was admitted into medical school. He graduated from the Institute of Medicine 1 in Rangoon (now Yangon) with a medical degree in 1987, after repeating his 2nd year.

Maung did not ally himself with the National League for Democracy or its leader, Aung San Suu Kyi. He did form alliances with other opposition figures, such as Zarganar. Maung met with Aung San Suu Kyi in January 2011, shortly after her release from house arrest.

Maung left Burma for four months in 2004 to attend the Yale World Fellows Program at Yale University in the United States, focusing on public policy. In 2006, Nay founded Myanmar Egress, a civil society organizations with other intellectuals, which he hoped would thaw relations between the government and other pro-democracy activists. Nay hoped Myanmar Egress, which was headquartered in a hotel in Yangon, to evolve into a Western-style economic and political think tank. Under Nay, Myanmar Egress gave classes and seminars in business skills, economics, democracy, and entrepreneurship. In 2008, Egress the relief effort in the aftermath of Cyclone Nargis, earning accolades from international and foreign relief organizations.

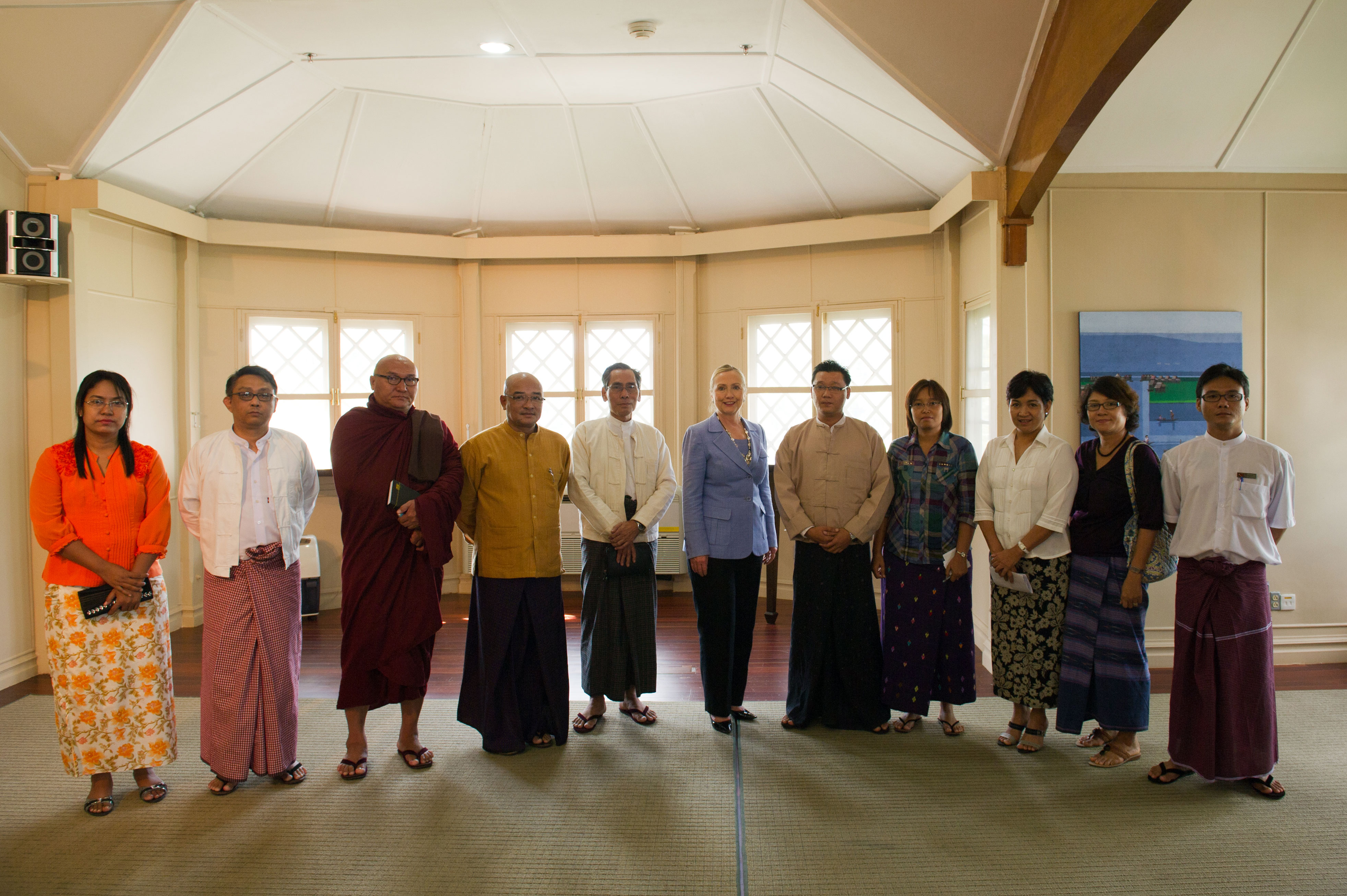
In December 2011, US Secretary of State Hillary Clinton met with Nay Win Maung, along with other civil society representatives. (Clicking on a person's face will take you to an article about the person.)

In March 2011, Burmese President Thein Sein called for reforms and good governance in his inauguration speech, leading to a series of reforms throughout 2011 and 2012. Maung, who had long advocated a conciliatory tone towards the generals, saw his ideas gain new prominence during the reform period and opposition leaders gradually warmed to his ideas. The vice president of the Union of Myanmar Federation of Chambers of Commerce and Industry, Maung Maung Lay, who represents business interests, told the Wall Street Journal, "We thought that he was pro-government...{but} he seems to [have been] impartial" as reforms accelerated and progressed in Burma.

== Death ==
Maung died from heart attack on January 1, 2012, at the age of 49. He was survived by his wife Win Kalayar Swe, three daughters, one son. At his funeral, wreaths from both the ruling government's Minister of Industry and NLD leader Aung San Suu Kyi were placed next to each other. Tributes from fellow pro-democracy activists, who had previously criticized his relations with the government, appeared in Twitter and Facebook. Likewise, the government also praised his efforts. Ye Htut, a spokesperson for the Burmese Ministry of Information stated, "Now we are at the beginning of the democratization process and losing him at this stage is a great loss...He foresaw that the new constitution would bring political space for democratization and urged all stakeholders to participate in the 2010 elections, but few people believed him and attacked him."
