= Phaung Daw U Pagoda (Lewe) =

Buddhist Pagoda in Naypyidaw, Myanmar

Phaung Taw Oo Pagoda
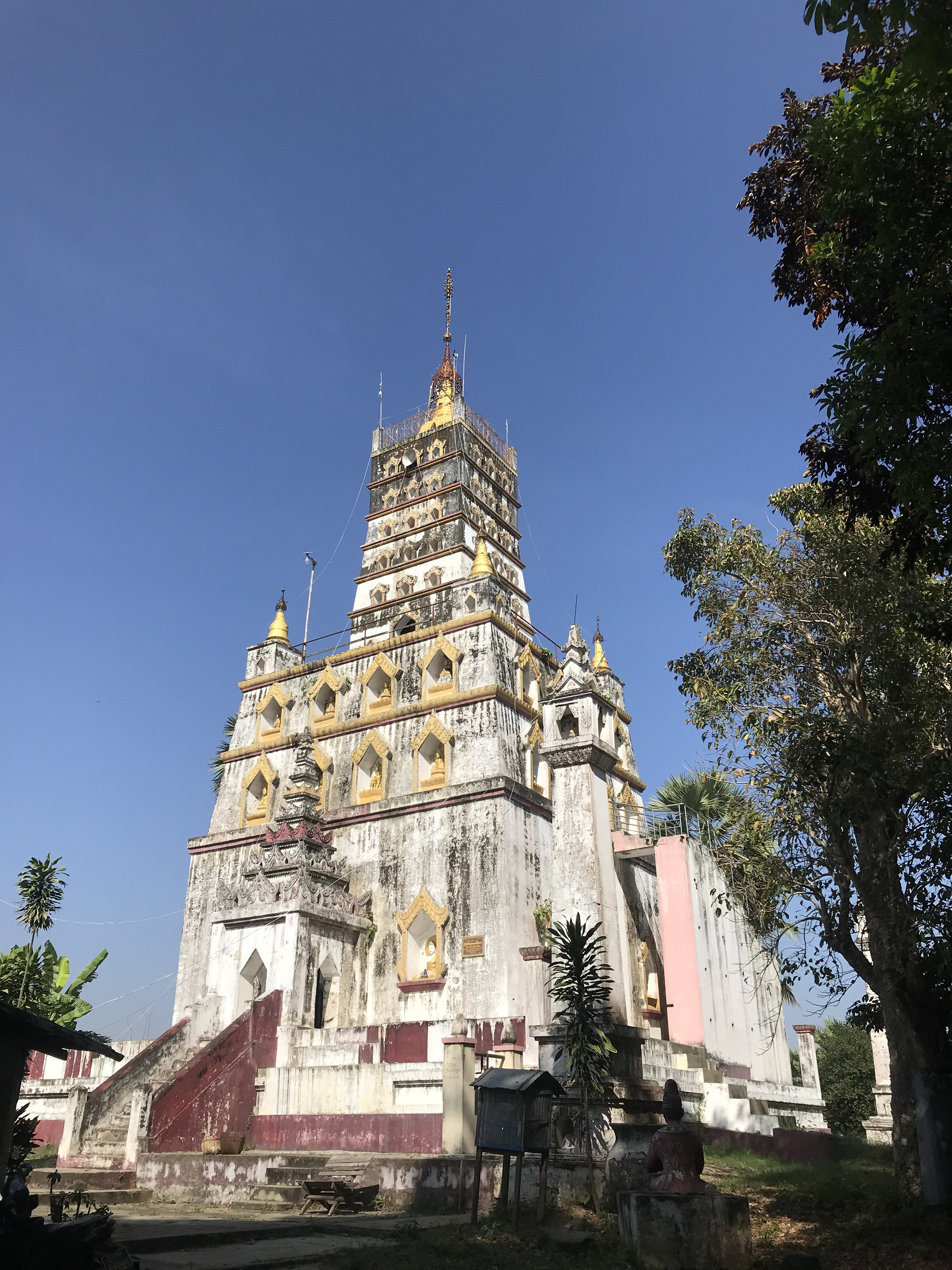

Religion
- Affiliation: Buddhism
- District: Lewe

Location
- Municipality: Lewe Township
- Country: Myanmar
- Interactive map of Phaung Taw Oo Pagoda
- Territory: Naypyidaw Union Territory
- Coordinates: 19°38′00″N 96°06′17″E

Architecture
- Founder: King Alaungsithu

Phaung Taw Oo Pagoda (also known as Hpaung Daw Oo) is a historical Buddhist stupa located in Lewe Township, Naypyidaw Union Territory, Myanmar. It features a cave-like design with a series of terraces. Another stupa, Moe-Kaung Pagoda, is nearby.

Sayadaw U Dama and Kon Nga Yar Khaing Sayadaw funded the construction and maintenance of the pagoda. The annual Hta-Ma-Nhae-Pwe festival, celebrated on full moon day in the month of Tabodwe (roughly September - October), is held here. The festivities last twenty days as four images of the Buddha are transported through the city by longboat; the boats are rowed using a technique which maximizes endurance. A fifth image of the Buddha is left at the pagoda to act as guardian while the festivities take place. Rowing competitions are also held during the festival.
