= Yangon Drugs Elimination Museum =

- မူးယစ်ဆေးဝါးပပျောက်ရေး အထိမ်းအမှတ်ပြတိုက်
- Established: 21 June 2001; 25 years ago
- Location: Kamayut Township, Yangon, Myanmar
- Coordinates: 16.8157°N 96.1314°E
- Accreditation: Ministry of Religious Affairs and Culture (Myanmar)
- Website: drugmuseum.gov.mm

The Drug Elimination Museum (Burmese: မူးယစ်ဆေးဝါးပပျောက်ရေး အထိမ်းအမှတ်ပြတိုက်) is a museum in Yangon, Myanmar. It opened with an official ceremony on 26 June 2001. It is located at the corner of Kyandaw Road and Hanthawady Road in Kamayut Township, Yangon, Burma, on the former site of the city's largest cemetery, Kyandaw Cemetery. It is dedicated to the International Day Against Drug Abuse and illicit trafficking.

The museum has three floors which contain exhibits on drug abuse and government efforts to contain the problem. The highlights of the museum include the eccentric dioramas, the random exhibits that demand interpretation, and the macabre displays depicting the detrimental repercussions of drug usage.
