= Yan Aung Myin Shwe Lett Hla Pagoda =

Buddhist Pagoda in Lewe, Myanmar

- ရန်အောင်မြင်ရွှေလက်လှစေတီ
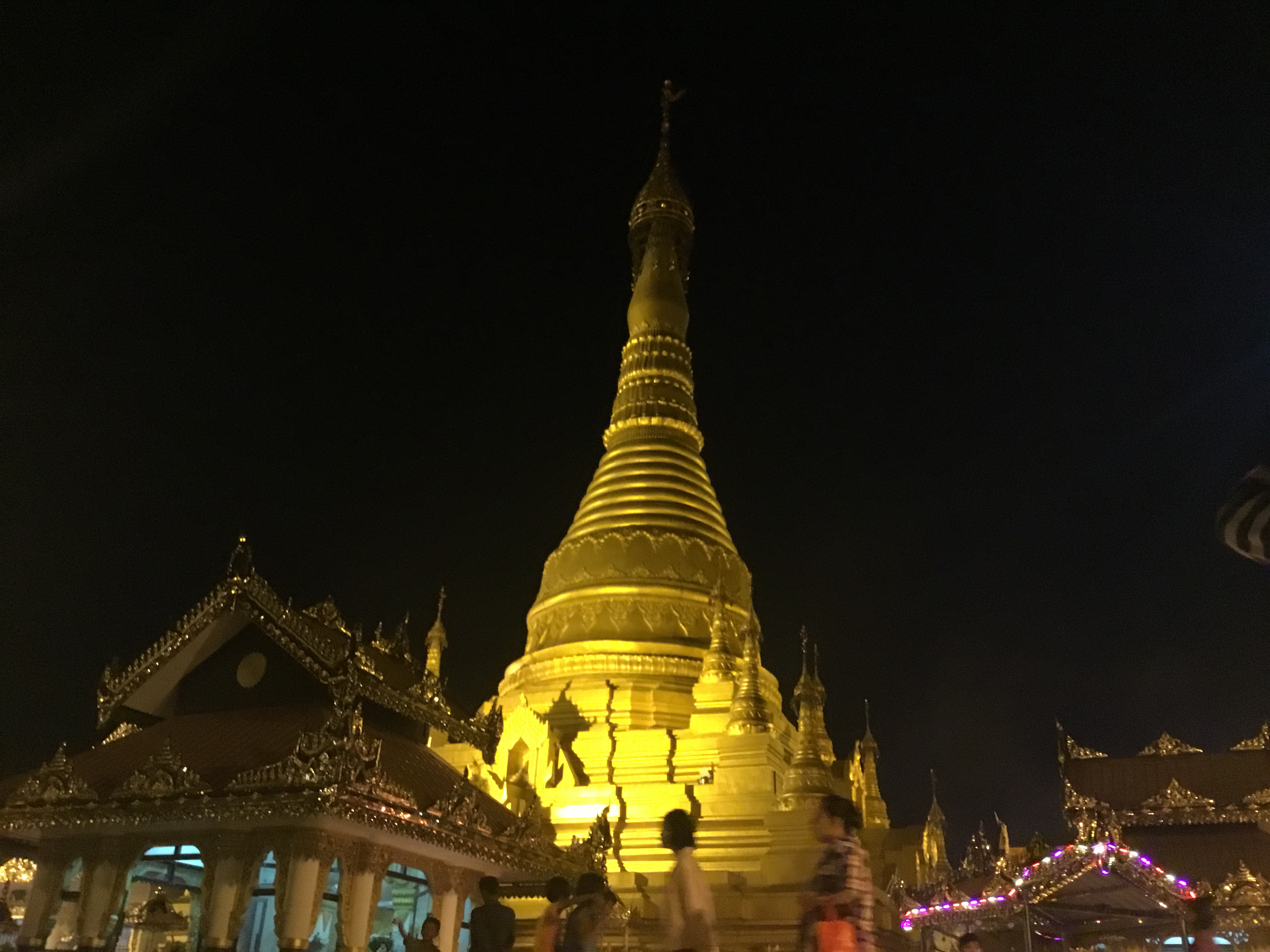
- Yan Aung Myin Shwe Lett Hla Pagoda

- Location in Myanmar

Religion
- Affiliation: Theravada Buddhism
- District: Lewe Township
- Ecclesiastical or organisational status: Active

Location
- Location: Yan Aung Myin Village, Lewe Township, Naypyidaw, Myanmar
- State: Naypyidaw Union Territory
- Country: Myanmar
- Coordinates: 19°39′54″N 96°07′30″E

Architecture
- Style: Burmese
- Materials: Brick, stucco

Yan Aung Myin Shwe Lett Hla Pagoda is a historical stupa located in Yan Aung Myin village in Lewe Township, Naypyidaw, in Myanmar.

== History ==
According to historical records, it was said that King Ashoka, in his reign from BC 268 to 232, had sent his counselors to the whole region to establish numerous stupas to honour the 84,000 relics of the Buddha. Shwe Let Hla stupa was one of the stupas which was built by the counselors of the King Ashoka in Yan Aung Myin village; formerly called Naung-Pyin village. It was also considered that, on AD 87, the King Thamoddarit (called later Bagan King) arrived at the stupa hill and maintained Naung-Pyin Stupa. When his hand was badly injured during a war with a Phyu kingdom, he retreated his troops and camped near the pagoda. Besides, he made a wish at the stupa to heal his wound instantly and to win the victory against his enemy. After witnessing that his prayers came true and were fulfilled miraculously, he changed the title of 'Naung Pyin Stupa' into 'Yan Aung Myin Stupa' (lit. Victory against foe) and renamed Naung Pyin village as Yan Aung Myin village. Since the injury of his arm had been healed and reached to a good condition in a blink of an eye, he named the pagoda 'Lett -Hla Pagoda', (lit. Beautiful hand or good hand) and later known as "Shwe Lett Hla Pagoda".

== Maintenance ==
The stupa had been modified in Bagan period under the reigns of King Alaungsithu and King Narapatisithu. It was said that in the time of King Mingyi Nyo of Taungoo, he often visited and updated the stupa and donated lands in the time of excavation to the Sin-Own Lake which is located in the southern tip of Naypyidaw now. The stupa collapsed in the 1838 earthquake on the days of King Tharrawaddy was maintained by the head of Lan-Pyinmana village, Nay-Myo-Kyaw-Thu U Ar-Toke.

== Donors ==
The pagoda was offered its Htidaw (Crown Umbrella) in 1868 by the brother of Mohnyin governor in King Mindon's reign and donated new one by "Bodhigon Sayadaw" on 1875.

== Photos ==
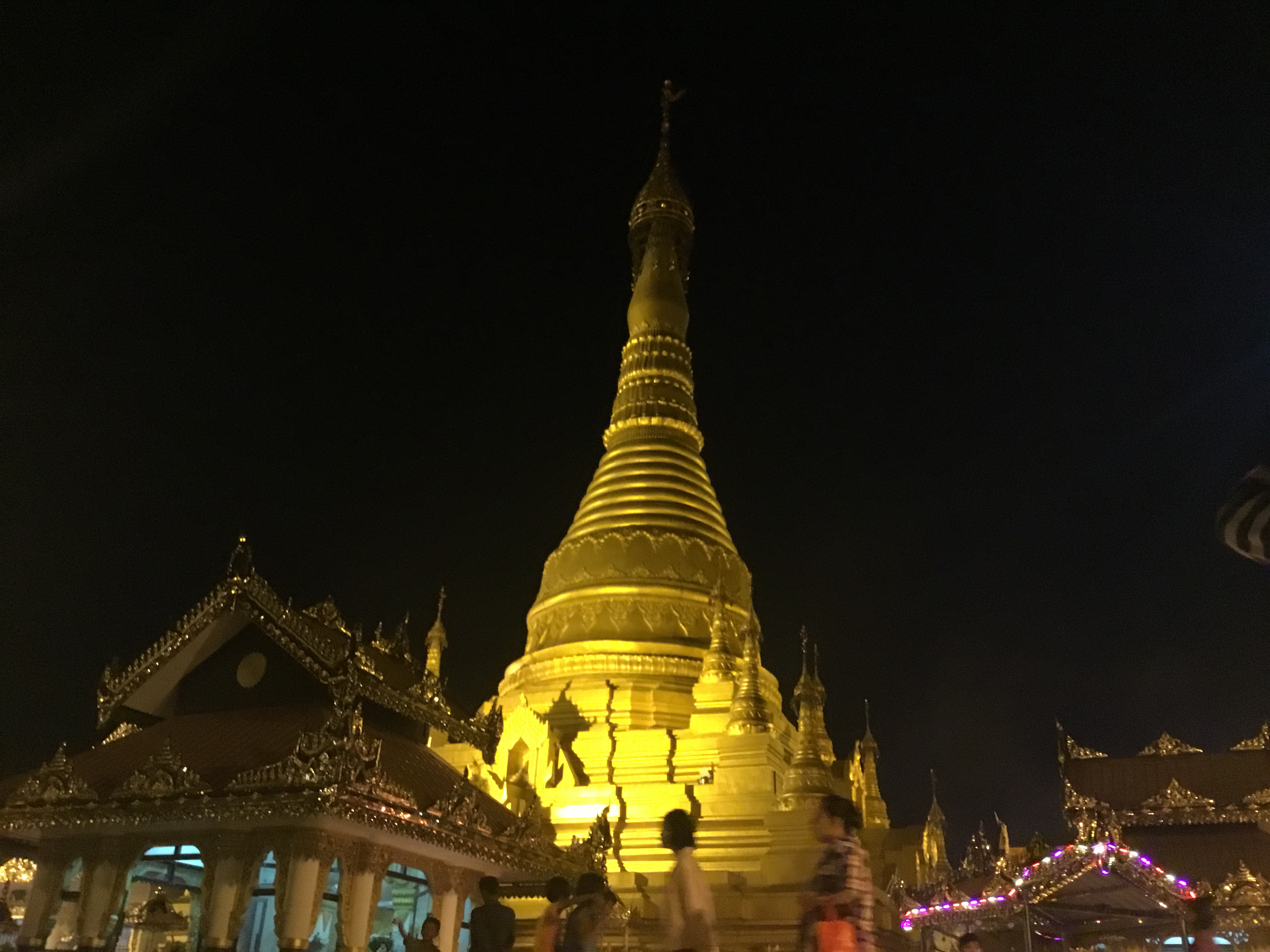

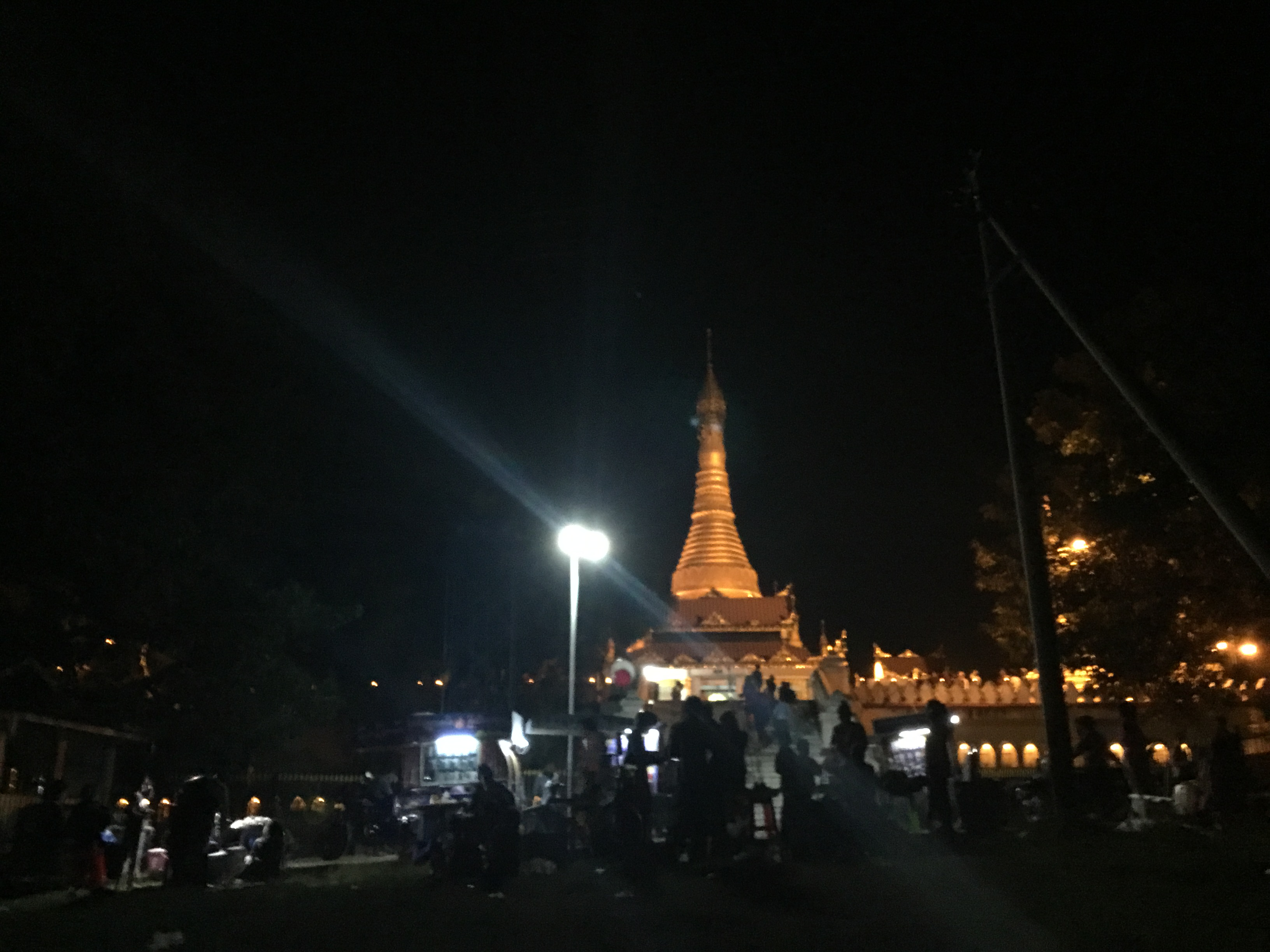
