= Bahan Township =

Township of Yangon, Myanmar

Bahan Township ဗဟန်း မြို့နယ်
- Township of Yangon
- Bahan Township
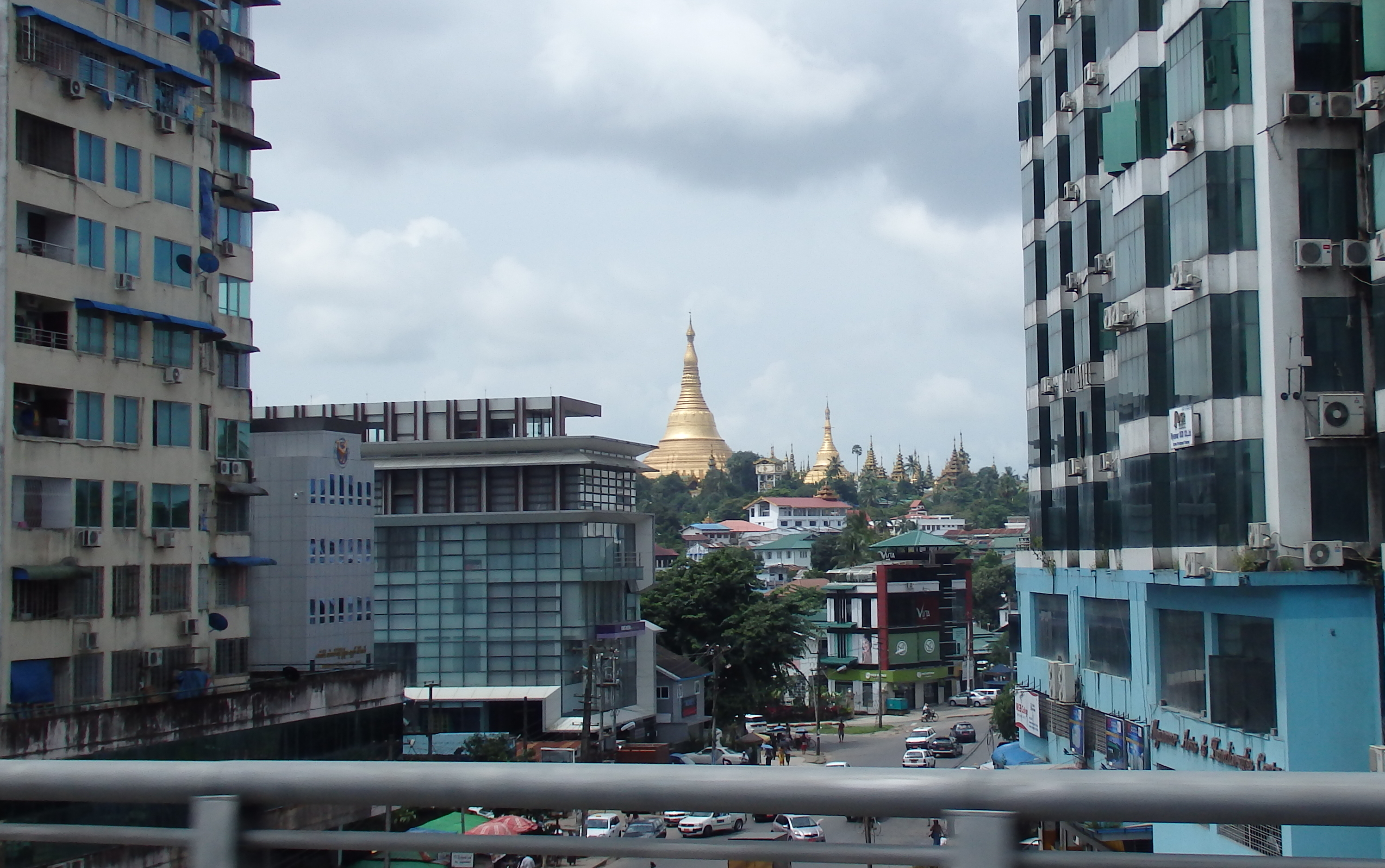
- View from the Shwe Gone Daing flyover

- Location within Myanmar
- Coordinates: 16°48′29″N 96°9′8″E
- Country: Myanmar
- Region: Yangon Region
- City: Yangon
- District: Kamayut District

Area
  - Total: 8.84 km^{2} (3.413 sq mi)

Population (2000)
  - Total: 81,000
  - Density: 9,200/km^{2} (24,000/sq mi)
- Time zone: UTC6:30 (MMT)
- Postal codes: 11201
- Area codes: 1 (mobile: 80, 99)

Bahan Township (Burmese: ဗဟန်း မြို့နယ်, pronounced [bəháɰ̃ mjo̰nɛ̀]) is located in the north central part of Yangon. The township comprises 22 wards, and shares borders with Yankin Township and Mayangon Township in the north, Sanchaung Township and Kamayut Township in the west, Tamwe Township in the east, and Dagon Township and Mingala Taungnyunt Township in the south.

Bahan is one of the most prosperous townships in Yangon. Shwetaunggya (formerly, Golden Valley), Sayarsan Road, and Inya Myaing are three of Yangon's most exclusive neighborhoods.

== Population ==
Bahan Township has 96,732 residents with 51,214 female and 45,518 male residents, as of 2014 March.

== Education ==
The township has 21 primary schools, three middle schools, and three high schools.The head of education in the council “U Min Thway Ne” raises funds for new schools building a new government school every five to seven years so children can learn without worry he said in an interview.One time he replaced a primary school with a high school. He has changed the education system multiple times for the sake of having modern education. He suggested for the public to treat everyone as equals and give chances for the poor to study. And that is the main reason he became head of education council.

== Landmarks ==
The following is a list of landmarks protected by the city in Bahan township.

The home where former State Counsellor Aung San Suu Kyi remained in house arrest for two decades is located in the district. The Bahan District court attempted to auction the property after the 2021 Myanmar coup d'etat multiple times and received no bidders.

Structure	Type	Address	Notes
Bogyoke Aung San Museum	Museum	25 Bogyoke Museum Lane	
Chaukhtatgyi Buddha Temple	Pagoda	Shwegondaing Lane	
Guanyin San Buddhist Sasana Center	Chinese Temple	136 West Shwegondaing Lane	
Guanyin Si Chinese Buddhist Monastery	Chinese Buddhist Monastery	58 Arzarni Lane	
Fushan Temple (福山寺)	Chinese Temple	160 Kaba Aye Pagoda Road	
Mayor's Residence (Old)	Hotel	21 Pearl Lane	Now, Mya Yeik Nyo Hotel
Mayor's Guest House (Old)	Hotel	22 Pearl Lane	Now, Mya Yeik Nyo Hotel
Ministry of Culture Building	Office	131 Kaba Aye Pagoda Road	
Ngahtatgyi Buddha Temple	Pagoda	Shwegondaing Lane	
Taingtaya Monastery Compound of Ngahtatgyi Monastery	Monastery		
Zhonghuasi Chinese Buddhist Nunnery	Chinese Buddhist Convent	69 Old Yedashe Lane	

The National League for Democracy and Air Bagan, an international airline, have their headquarters in Bahan.
