= Nwe (surname) =

Nwe or Nweh is a Burmese surname. Notable people with the surname include:

- Khin Moe Nwe (born 1973), Burmese weightlifter
- Nat Nwe (1933–2011), Burmese writer
- San San Nweh, Burmese writer and journalist
- Su Su Nwe (born 1971), Burmese democracy activist and political prisoner
- Yin Yin Nwe (born c. 1952), Burmese geologist
