= Chaukhtatgyi Buddha Temple =

Buddhist temple in Yangon, Myanmar

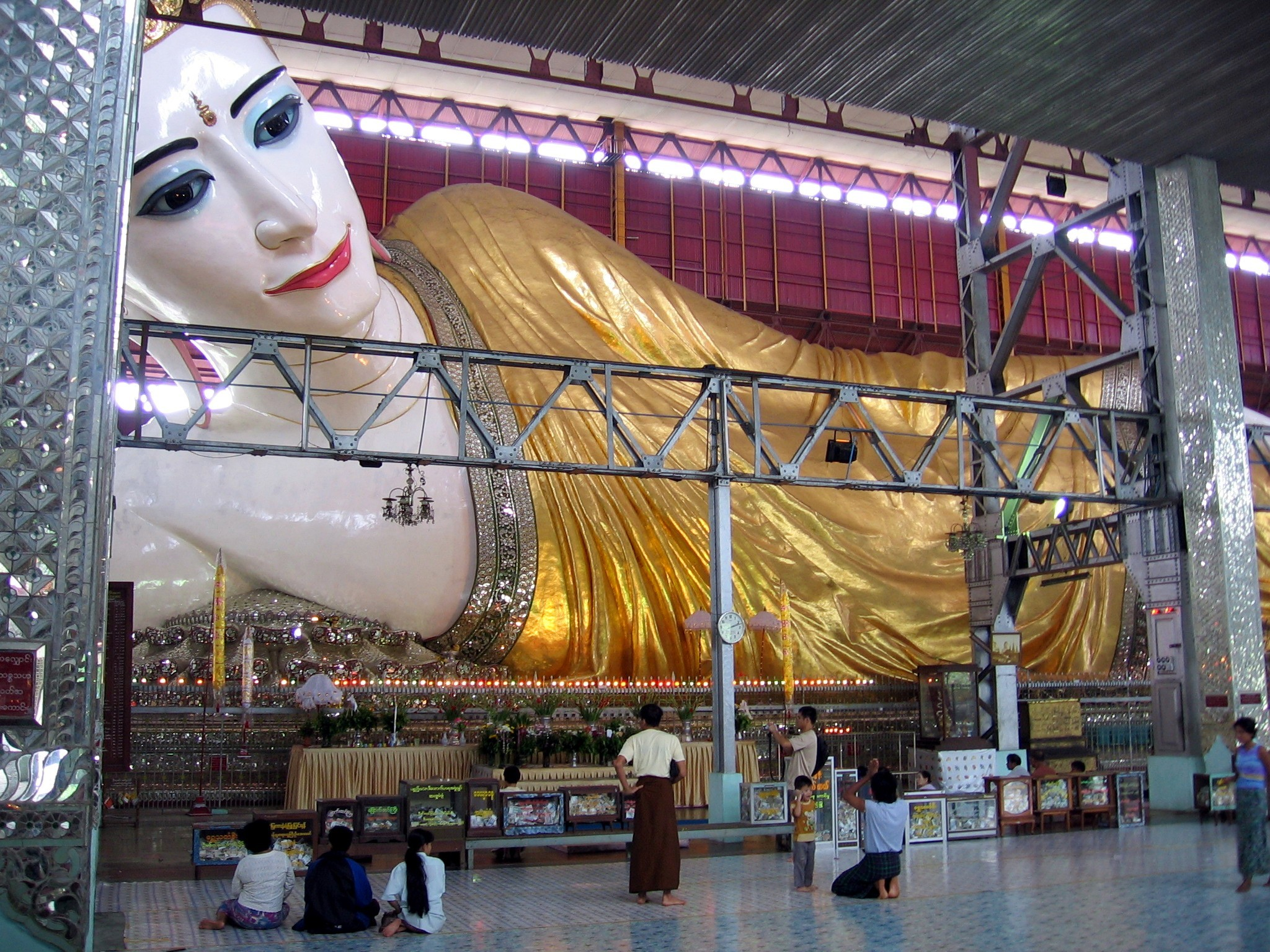

- Location within Myanmar

Religion
- Affiliation: Theravada Buddhism

Location
- Location: Bahan Township, Yangon, Yangon Region
- Country: Myanmar
- Interactive map of Chaukhtatgyi Buddha Temple
- Coordinates: 16.811623°N 96.163764°E

Architecture
- Founder: Sir Po Tha
- Completed: 1907

Chaukhtatgyi Buddha Temple (Burmese: ခြောက်ထပ်ကြီးဘုရားကြီး) is the most well-known Buddhist temple in Bahan Township, Yangon, Yangon Region, Myanmar. It houses one of the most revered reclining Buddha images in the country. The Buddha image is 66 metres (217 ft) long, and one of the largest in Myanmar.

The construction was sponsored by a wealthy Burmese Buddhist, Sir Po Tha, in 1899. The image was completed in 1907 by another construction company, but was not proportioned correctly, and the Buddha's face had an aggressive expression.

In the 1950s, the old Buddha image was demolished and temple trustees began work to replace the image, under the supervision of U Thaung, a master craftsman from Tavoy (now Dawei). Large glass eyes with dimensions of 1.77 by .58 metres (5 ft 10 in × 1 ft 11 in) were custom-created at Naga Glass Factory. The Buddha image was consecrated in 1973.

== Gallery ==
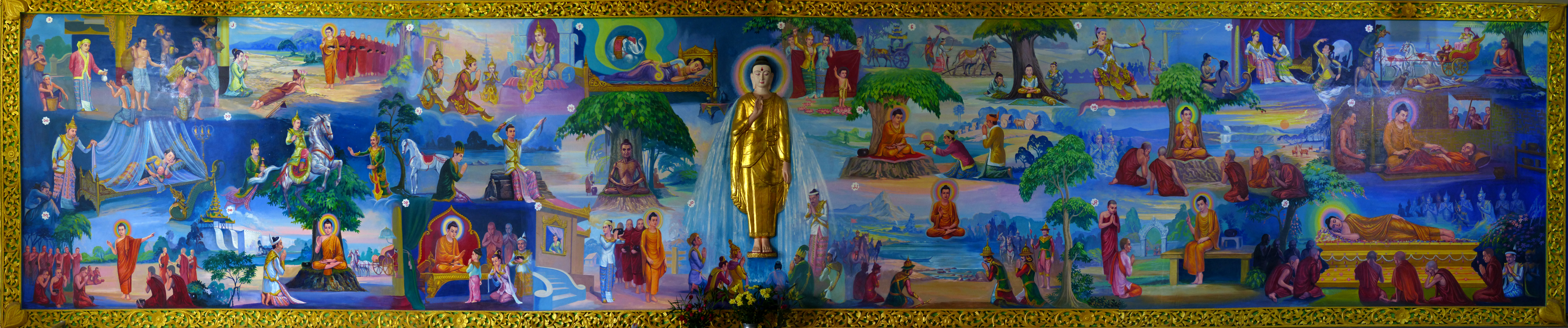
Giant wallpainting inside the pagoda

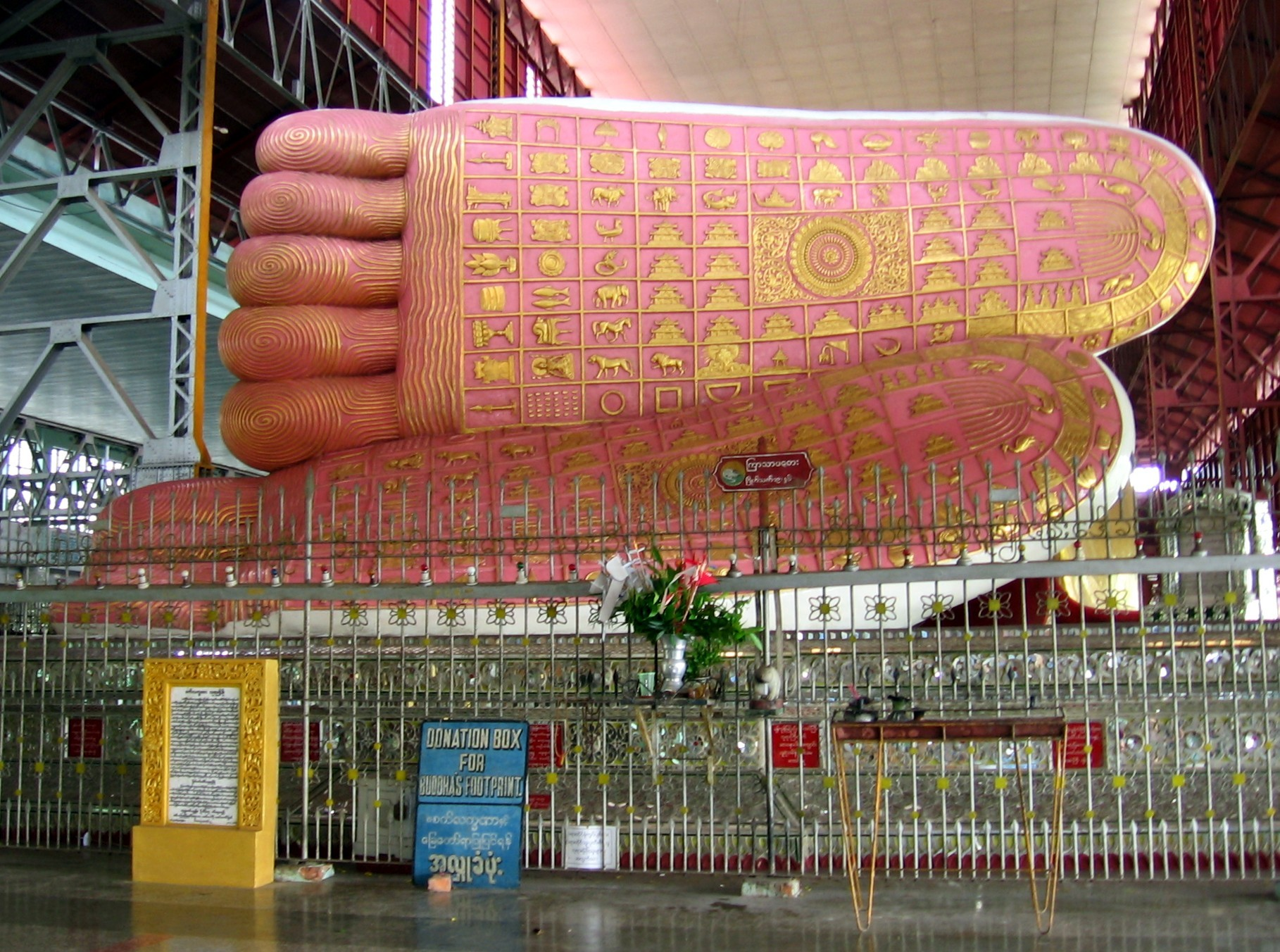
Buddha footprint, containing the 108 marks

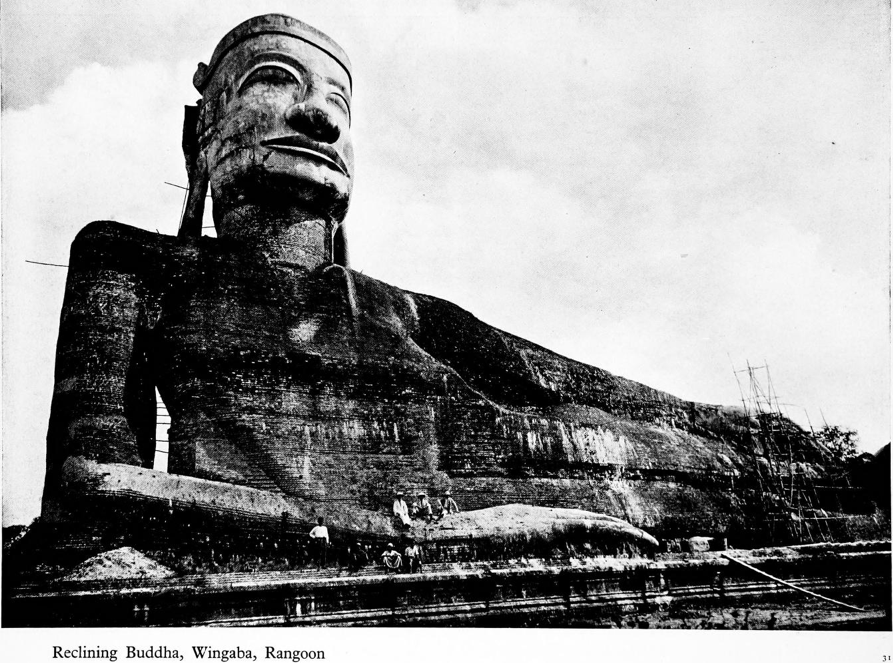
The old Buddha image in 1900

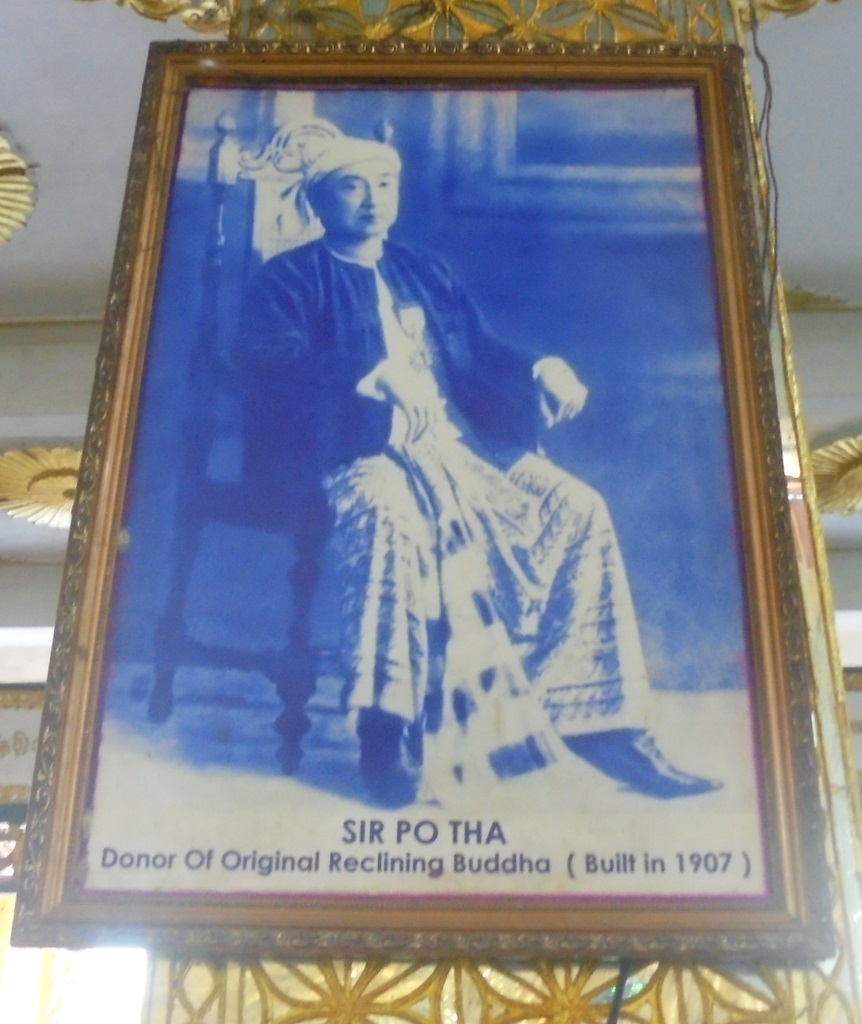
Founder and donor

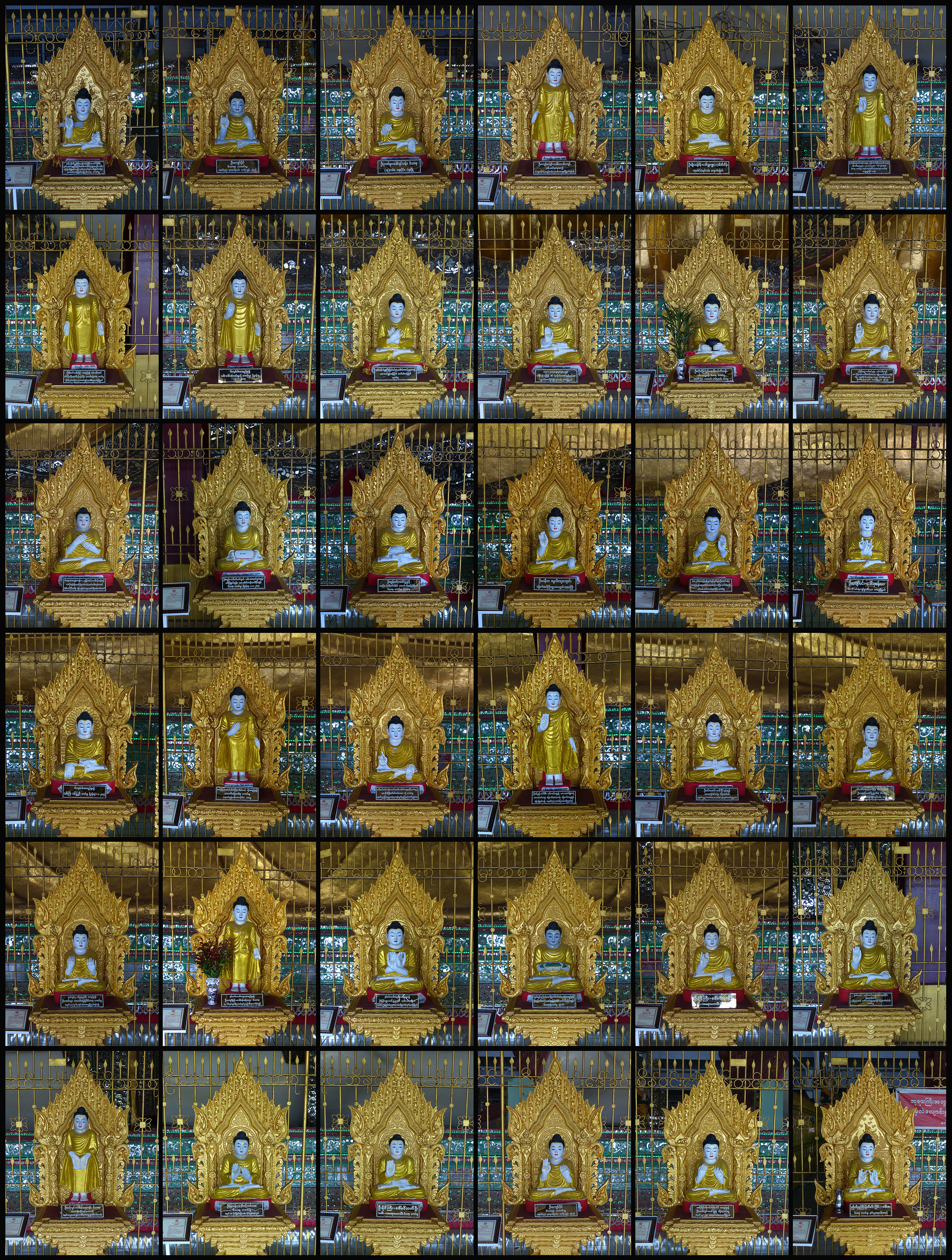
36 Small Buddha statues inside
