= Lewe =

- Town
- Location in Burma
- Coordinates: 19°38′0″N 96°7′0″E
- Country: Myanmar
- Division: Naypyidaw Union Territory
- Township: Lewe Township

Population (2005)
  - Urban: 30,208
  - Religions: Buddhism
- Time zone: UTC+6.30 (MST)

Lewe is a town in the Naypyidaw Union Territory of central Myanmar.

== Location and population ==
Lewe is one of the administrative township in Naypyidaw Union territory, Myanmar. It is about ten miles southwest from Pyinmana Township. It is not only laid on the way of Pyinmana-Kyaukpandaung Railway Road, but also on Yangon-Mandalay Highway Road. As its focal point in trade network, bulk of local goods such as agricultural products flow are fast. Although Lewe Township was formerly part of Mandalay Division, it was designated as one of the original townships constituting the new capital region of Naypyidaw on 26 November 2008 by the Ministry Of Home Affairs. According to official data of the 2014 census, Lewe township has a population of 284,393 while the urban population is just 30,208.

== History ==
At first, in Burma, in the year 191, it was because of "'Mg-Ngwet '" (မောင်နွဲ့ )founded Lewe on a small hill called initially "Nga-Ngwet-Gone or Nga-Ngwe-Gone" (ငနွဲ့ကုန်း ခေါ် ငနွယ်ကုန်း), later to become "Wa-Ngwe-Gone" (ဝါးနွယ်ကုန်း). Name terms often change according to a change of era. The site of the old town was located around "Myoh-Gone Village" from southwest of new Lewe. The old town was about 1050 feet long from east to west and wide about 840 feet from north to south. According to the expression of ancient historical records, it was known that each brick high-wall of the town was 15-feet high with a moat around the high-wall.

"Min-Nagar (မင်းနဂါး) :King of Dragons" ruled " Wa-Ngwe-Gone" as Duke till Burma Year 191. In the beginning of year 202, when he reigned as King of Taung-Dwin-Gyi, he appointed to MP U Shwe-Lou as Duke of Wa-Ngwe-Gone. Such old town, Wa-Ngwe-Gone, was ruled by successive rulers.

Madam Khin-Oo, mother of Da-Bin-Shwe-Htee, who reigned in Kay-Tu-Ma-Ti, Taungoo in the beginning of the Burma year 892, was also a daughter of the Head of Wa-Ngwe-Gone Region. From the beginning of the year 1788 to nowadays, also called Lewe or Leiway.

Since the time of excavation to Sin-Own-Lake, agricultural sector such as rice cultivation improved widely in the whole region and rice mills and oil mills were established. As Lewe is a forested region, timber production flourished.

== Urban area ==
Lewe Township consists of 7 Wards and is composed by 60 villages and 261 Sub-village groups, according to the 2014 census data.

== Boundaries ==
Lewe is bounded by Pyinmana Township in the east, Yedashe Township in south, Taungdwingyi Township in west, and Dekkhinathiri and Pyinmana Township in the north. Its length is 47.02 miles from east to west, 18.64 miles long across north to south, and more than 872,248 square miles in area.

== Geography, climate and vegetation ==
Lewe is located between mountains of Bago Yoma in the west and of Shan Yoma ranges in the east. There is no plain land in the region. Its lowest altitude is 210 feet above sea level and highest altitude is 2090 feet. Lewe is in monsoon climate region with maximum temperatures of 40 degrees Celsius and the minimum temperature is 22 degrees Celsius. Its current environmental conservation condition is covered by forest over 75 percent, one of the reserves is to protect the forest and the rest cover 68 percent. Vegetation in the region are valuable timber, the tip, cab, sal tree, hardwood and other kinds of wood plants, and also a variety of bamboo.

== Economy ==
Lewe, as part of NayPyiTaw Administrative body, its communication path is close and placed on the intersection to the main road transportation. Agricultural and livestock products are mainly traded and the second business is services.

In the agricultural sector, there are farms, upland, lowland, branches, garden, pasture lands. Mainly cultivating crops are corn, pulses, Oilseed, Industrial crops for raw materials. Orchards grow a variety of crops as well as other seasonal crops upon the market sector.

There are Township level 2-livestock zones in which bulk of chickens, pork, buffalo, Cow, Sheep, goats, quail, Dairy cattle and fish. The shrimp farming industry. tourism, transaction services, Industries, furniture industry, transport and other shopping stores are working in Lewe area.

== Healthcare ==
Lewe is served by a public hospital: 100-bed Lewe General Hospital, 3 of circuit hospitals, 10 of Rural Healthcare Sub-divisions and 9 of private clinics.

== Education ==
Totally, in educational infrastructure there are 11 basic education high schools, 16 middle schools, 226 primary schools, 9 nursery schools and 11 monastic schools. Literacy index of Lewe is 99.95.

== Gallery ==
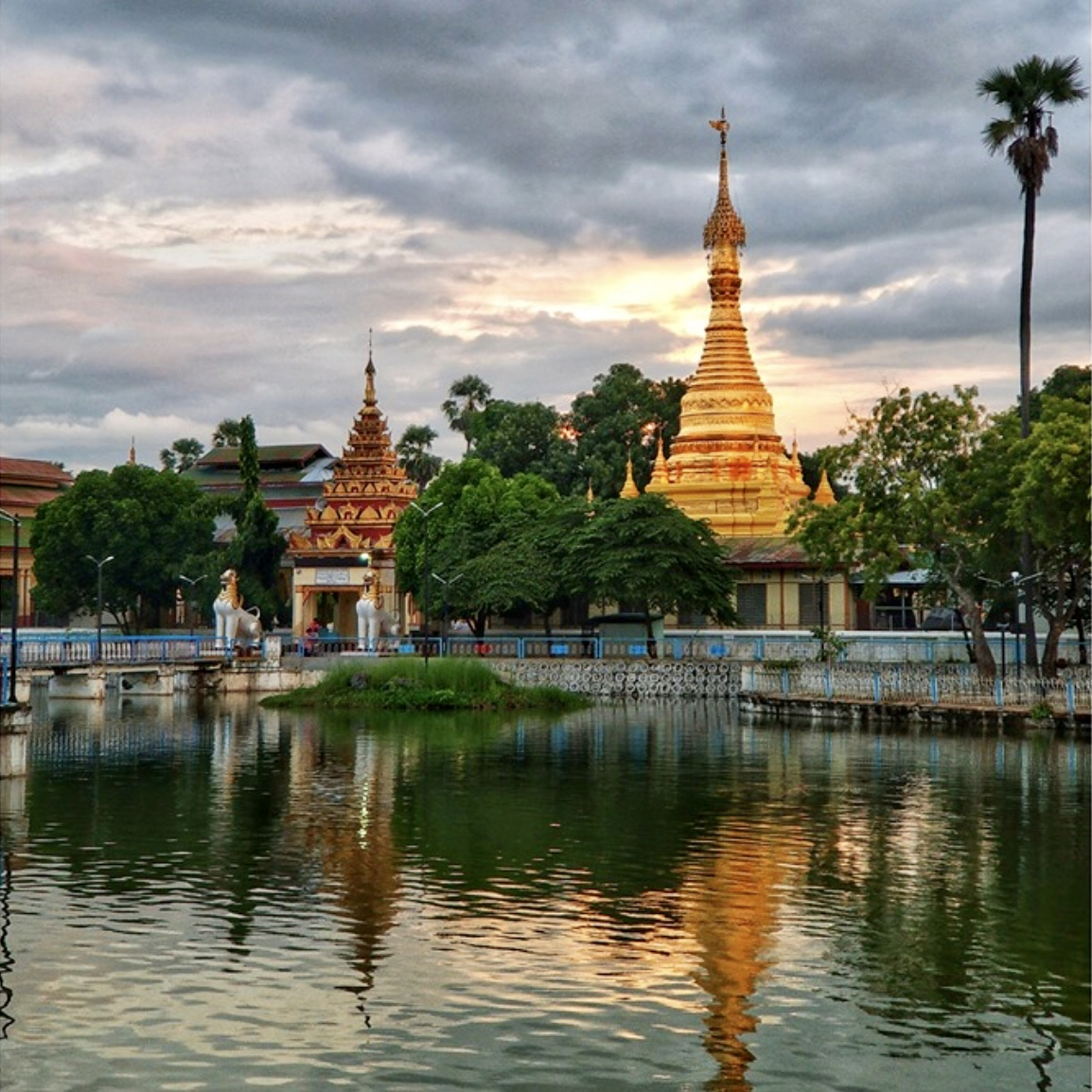
Paung Daw Chat Ma Pagoda

== Main sights ==
Lewe Township's landmarks and main sights are;

- Phaung-Daw-Chat-Ma Pagoda
- Phaung Taw Oo Pagoda
- Yan Aung Myin Shwe Lett Hla Pagoda
- Sama Taung
- Yat-Kan-Zin Hill
