= Khin Maung Toe =

Khin Maung Toe ခင်မောင်တိုး
- Born: 2 April 1950; Mawlaik, Sagaing Division, Burma
- Died: 15 November 2012 (aged 62) Singapore
- Genres: Burmese pop
- Occupation: singer
- Instrument: guitar
- Years active: 1973–2012

Khin Maung Toe (Burmese: ခင်မောင်တိုး [kʰɪ̀ɰ̃ màʊɰ̃ tó]; 2 April 1950 – 15 November 2012) was a Burmese singer songwriter, and was the longtime lead singer of the Medium Wave (မဇ္ဈိမလှိုင်း) band. He was one of the few successful Burmese singer-songwriters who wrote his own original songs. He released 35 albums in his career. He is best known for his 1984 hit "Maha Hsan Thu" (မဟာဆန်သူ).

== Career ==
Khin Maung Toe was born in Mawlaik, Sagaing Division (now Sagaing Region) in northwestern Myanmar, third son of Daw Khin Hla and U Khin Maung. His father was a regional government official.

Khin Maung Toe became first interested in making music in his second year at the Rangoon Institute of Technology in the late 1972s, when the Burmese pop music, modeled on Western rock-and-roll and country music, was just taking shape. He said in a 2000 interview that he and his generation of musicians faced both encouragement and criticism for the new kind of music. He released his debut album in 1973 with the E Machines band, and the follow-up album a year later.

In 1978, he left Mandalay for Yangon, then the capital and largest city. In the early 80s, he formed a band called the Mizzima Hlaing (မဇ္ဈိမလှိုင်း, lit. the Medium Wave), and became the lead singer of the band. In 1984, the band released Maha Hsan Thu album. The success of the album made Khin Maung Toe and the band household names.

Their style was a modernized version of traditional Burmese music updated with Western musical instruments and arrangements. Their biggest hit, "Maha Hsan Thu", could have been a classic Burmese song from the prewar era if not for the background Western instrumentals and arrangements. In the 1980s and the 1990s, Khin Maung Toe and Medium Wave with their "original" music successfully carved out a niche in the Burmese pop music scene which was mainly dominated by covers of foreign songs. They released 18 albums in those two decades. However, the band broke up in the early 2000s after its Keyboardist Myo Khin had died.

His last performance was in September 2012 in a charity concert organized by the 88 Generation Students Group.

== Personal life ==
Khin Maung Toe was married to Wai Wai Khaing. They had three children. He died on 15 November 2012 in Singapore from liver cancer.

== Discography ==
He released 35 albums in his career.

1. Kyezu Tin De, Gaba-Gyi-Ye (1973)
2. Yin-Khon-Nay-Thaw Einmet-Nge (1974)
3. Izzali A-Twet Izzali အဉ္စလီ အတွက် အဉ္စလီ (1980)
4. Waing Ye Hsiza ဝိုင်းရဲ့ဆည်းဆာ (1981)
5. Saung-Gyo-Hshaik-Than Ne Hse-Hnit-Ta Tay Mya (1982)
6. Maha Hsan Thu (1984)
7. Gyogya Than (1985)
8. Myet-Thwè (1986)
9. Yaung-Zin Khunna-Thwè (1988)
10. Way-Ge-Bi Pan-Khayan-Pya (1990)
11. Lay Hnyoe Shin (A-side) & Lwe-Lwe-Ne Ma-Hpyit-Bu (B-side, Sai Htee Saing) (1991)
12. Pan-Daw-U (1993)
13. Myit-Da-Zin Hpyit-Ti-Mhu (1994)
14. Live 94 (Live Show)
15. Selection Songs 1 & 2
16. Thamudaya Kyo Thon Bin
17. Yi-Ywè-Thu (1995)
18. Mhi-Twè-Ya Lwan (1996)
19. Hlaing-Htet-Ka Chay-Ya (1997)
20. Yin-Khat A-Lwan (1998)
21. Kwa No Thet-Hat
22. Seit-Kyaik Tay – Best of Khin Maung Toe
23. Thachin Da-Bok (1999)
24. Letywayzin A-Kaung-Zon Tay-Mya
25. A-Kaung-Zon Tay-Mya
26. Teik-Ta-Kho
27. A-Kyaik-Hson Gaung-Zi Tay-Mya (2000)
28. A-Kyaik-Hson Dandayi Tay-Mya (2001)
29. Lwan Wut-Hmon (2003)
30. A-Kyaik-Hson Mandalay Tay-Mya (2005)
31. Khun-hna-hnit A-Lun (2007)
32. Shwin-Lan Chan-Myei Ba Zay (Water Festival Songs) (2008)
33. Mizzima Hlaing Gayet Mya (Live Show)
34. The-U Thissa (2010)
35. Khun-Ah Phae Mi Nge (2012)
