= Shwetaunggya =

Neighbourhood in Bahan, Yangon

Shwetaunggya (Burmese: ရွှေတောင်ကြား, lit. 'Golden Valley'), also known as Shwe Taung Gyar, is a locality within Bahan Township, Yangon, Burma. It is one of Yangon's most exclusive neighbourhoods.

== History ==
During the British rule of Burma, Shwetaunggya was known as Golden Valley and served as a prosperous suburb for wealthy European, Chinese and Indian merchants.
