= Lewe Township =

Lewe Township လယ်ဝေးမြို့နယ်
- Township
- Lewe Township in Dekkhina District
- Coordinates: 19°38′N 96°7′E
- Country: Myanmar
- Territory: Naypyidaw Union Territory
- District: Dekkhina District
- Capital: Lewe
- Time zone: UTC+6:30 (MMT)

Lewe Township (Burmese: လယ်ဝေးမြို့နယ်) is one of eight townships of Naypyidaw Union Territory, Burma.

== History ==
The area comprising Lewe Township was previously called Nga-nwe-kon (ငနွဲ့ကုန်း), Nwekon (နွယ်ကုန်း), and Wa-nwe-kon-zu (ဝါးနွယ်ကုန်းစု), in reference to its establishment on a hillock.

In 191 Myanmar Era, the area was called "Nga-Ngwet-Gone or Nga-Ngwe-Gone" (ငနွဲ့ကုန်း ခေါ် ငနွယ်ကုန်း) after the town's founder "Maung Ngwet" (မောင်နွဲ့), who founded Lewe on a small hill. It later became"Wa-Ngwe-Gone". Name terms often change according to a change of era. The site of the old town was located around "Myoh-Gone Village" from southwest of new Lewe. The old town was about 1050-feet long from east to west and wide about 840-feet from north to south. According to the expression of ancient historical records, it was known that each brick high-wall of the town was 15 feet high and a moat around the High-Wall was displayed.

"Min-Nagar" (မင်းနဂါး): King of Dragons ruled "Wa-Ngwe-Gone" as Duke till Burma Year 191. At the beginning of year 202, when he reigned as King of Taung-Dwin-Gyi, he appointed MP U Shwe-Lou as Duke of Wa-Ngwe-Gone. Such an old town, Wa-Ngwe-Gone, was ruled by successive rulers. Madam Khin-Oo, the mother of Da-Bin-Shwe-Htee, who reigned in Kay-Tu-Ma-Ti, Taungoo at the beginning of the Burma year 892, was also a daughter of the Head of Wa-Ngwe-Gone Region. From the beginning of the year 1788 to nowaday, also called Lewe or Leeway. Since the time of excavation to Sin-Own-Lake, agricultural sector such as rice cultivation improved widely in the whole region, and rice mills, oil mills were established. As Lewe is a forest coverage region, timber production was well flourished before.

Since 1788, it has been known as Lewe.

In the evening of April 21th of 2023, a Tornado was hit Lewe, at least eight people were killed and dozens more injured when a rare and powerful tornado struck a village near Myanmar's capital, Naypyidaw.

== Location and population ==
Historical population
Year	Pop.	±%
2014	284,393	—

Lewe is one of the administrative townships in Naypyidaw Union territory, Myanmar. It is located about ten miles southwest of Pyinmana Township. As its focal point in the trade network, the bulk of local goods such as agricultural products flow are fast. It lies on the way to Pyinmana via Kyaukpandaung Railway Road and the Yangon-Mandalay Highway Road. Although Lewe Township was formerly part of Mandalay Division, on 26 November 2008, it was designated as one of the original townships constituting the new capital region of Naypyidaw by the Ministry Of Home Affairs. According to the 2014 census, Lewe township has a population of 284,393.

=== Demographics ===
The 2014 Myanmar Census reported that Lewe Township had a population of 284,393. The population density was 125.9 people per km^{2}. The census reports that the median age was 25.7 years, and 94 males per 100 females. There were 51,747 households; the mean household size was 4.3.

=== Ethnic makeup ===
Ethnic composition of Lewe Township
Ethnic group	Percentage
Bamar	98.6%
Chin	1.1%
Kayin	0.2%
Kayah	0.1%
Source: 2019 GAD township reports

The Bamar make up the majority of the township's population, while the Chin form the largest minority group.

== Urban area ==
Lewe Township consists of 7 Wards and composed by 60 villages and 261 sub-village groups according to 2014 census data.

== Borders ==
Lewe is bounded by Pyinmana Township in the east, Yedashe Township in the south, Taungdwingyi Township in the west, Dekkhinathiri, and Pyinmana Township in the north, respectively. It lengths 47.02 miles from East to West, 18.64 miles long across North to South, and more than 872,248 square miles in area.

== Geography, climate and vegetation ==
Lewe is located between the mountains of Bago Yoma in the west and of Shan Yoma ranges in the east. There is no plain land in the region. Its minimum above sea level is 210 feet (64 m) and the maximum level is 2,090 feet (640 m). Lewe is in a monsoon climate region with maximum temperatures of 40 °C (104 °F) and a minimum temperature is 22 °C (72 °F). Its current environmental conservation condition is covered by forest over 75 percent, one of the reserves is to protect the forest, and the rest covers 68 percent. Vegetation in the region is valuable Timber, The Tip, cab, Sal Tree, Hardwood and other kinds of wood plants, and also found is a variety of bamboo.

== Economy ==
Lewe, as part of Naypyidaw Union Territory, its communication path is close and placed on the intersection to the main road transportation. Agricultural and Livestock products are mainly traded and the second business is services trade.

In the agricultural sector, there are farms, upland, and lowland, branches, garden, pasture land. Mainly cultivating crops are corn, pulses, Oilseed, Industrial crops for raw materials. Orchards grow a variety of crops as well as other seasonal crops in the market sector.

There are Township level 2-livestock zones in which bulk of chickens, pork, buffalo, cow, sheep, goats, quail, dairy cattle, and fish. The shrimp farming industry, tourism, transaction services, industries, furniture industry, transport, and other shopping stores are working in the Lewe area.

== Healthcare ==
Lewe is served by a public hospital: 100-bed Lewe General Hospital, 3 circuit hospitals, 10 Rural Healthcare Sub-divisions, and 9 private clinics.

== Education ==
In educational infrastructure, 11 Basic Education High Schools, 16 Middle Schools, 226 primary schools, 9 Nursery Schools, and 11 monastic schools. The literacy index of Lewe is 99.95.

== Places of interest ==
- Phaung-Daw-Chat-Ma Pagoda
- Phaung Taw Oo Pagoda
- Yan Aung Myin Shwe Lett Hla Pagoda
- Sama Taung
- Yat-Kan-Zin Hill
