= Nat Nwe =

- နတ်နွယ်
- Born: Hla Myint; 1 February 1933; Myitkyina, British Burma
- Died: 11 May 2011 (aged 78); North Dagon Township, Yangon, Myanmar
- Resting place: Yayway Cemetery, Yangon
- Occupations: Writer, Poet
- Known for: Founder of Nwe Ni magazine
- Parent(s): Ba Wan; Saw Lon
- Awards: National Literature Award

Hla Myint, better known by his pseudonym Nat Nwe (Burmese: နတ်နွယ်), was a prominent Burmese writer, best known as the founder of Nwe Ni, a foreign affairs magazine. He began his career in 1950, after publishing a poem titled "Schoolgirl" (ကျောင်းသူမ) in the Hanthawaddy newspaper. Over the course of his career, he wrote more than 100 novels and translated 20 from other languages into Burmese. He died of natural causes at his home on 11 May 2011 and was cremated at Yayway Cemetery on 13 May.
