= Paragu =

Burmese writer (1921–2011)

- ပါရဂူ
- Born: Hla Kyaing လှကြိုင် 10 November 1921; Thandantanaw village, Hinthada District, British Burma
- Died: 9 April 2011 (aged 89); Yangon, Burma
- Resting place: Yayway Cemetery, Yangon
- Other names: Weizza; Hla Kyaing; Ponnayika
- Education: Banaras Hindu University
- Occupation: Writer
- Parent(s): Ba Saw; May Thote

Paragu (Burmese: ပါရဂူ; pronounced [pàɹəɡù]; 10 November 1921 – 9 April 2011) was a Burmese writer. He was a multilingual writer in Burmese, Japanese, Hindi and Pali and published 100 books until he died. He built and owned a library, the Paragu Shantiniketan Library, in Yangon. He was buried at the Yayway Cemetery in Yangon.
