= Pyay Road =

Road in Myanmar

Coordinates: 16°50′24.7″N 96°08′05.8″E

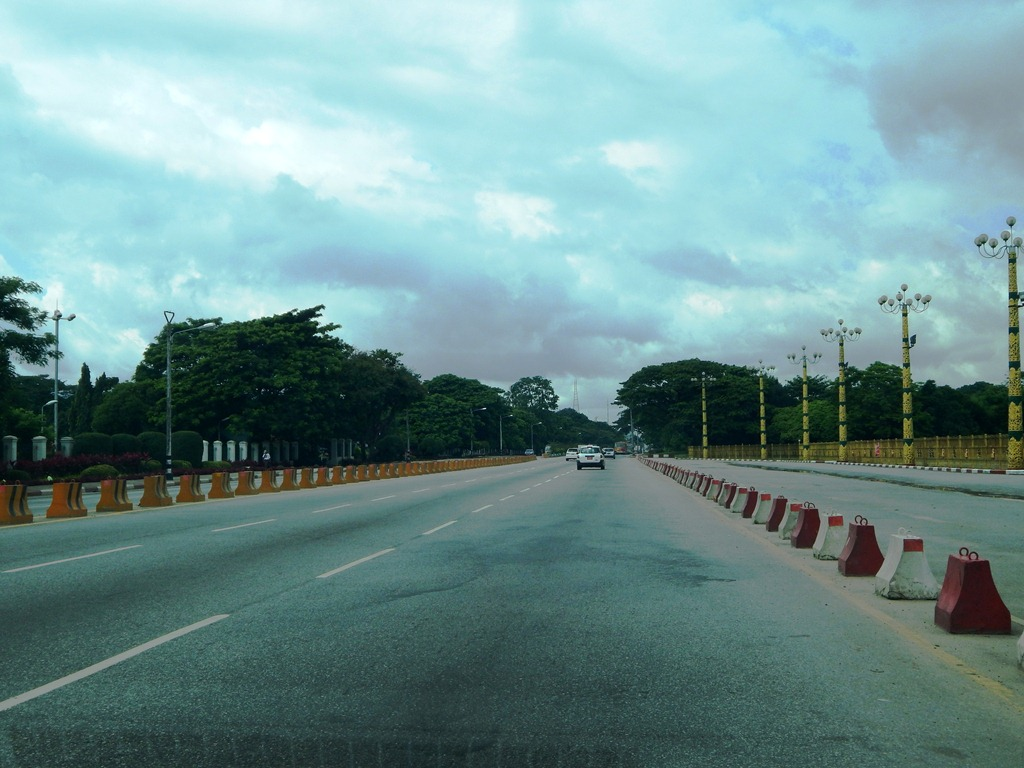
Pyay Road, Yangon

Pyay Road (Burmese: ပြည်လမ်း, formerly Prome Road) is a major thoroughfare of Yangon, Burma and the first stage of the National Highway 1 which eventually leads to Mandalay. It crosses the western-central side of the city in a north–south direction. It contains many important buildings, including banks, hospitals, several government buildings, major hotels, various television and radio stations, including the National Museum, the old National Parliament building, People's Square and Park, Myanmar Radio and Television Building, Junction Square, Yangon University, and leads up to Inya Lake.
