= Kamayut Township =

Township of Yangon, Myanmar

Kamayut Township ကမာရွတ် မြို့နယ်
- Township of Yangon
- Kamayut Township
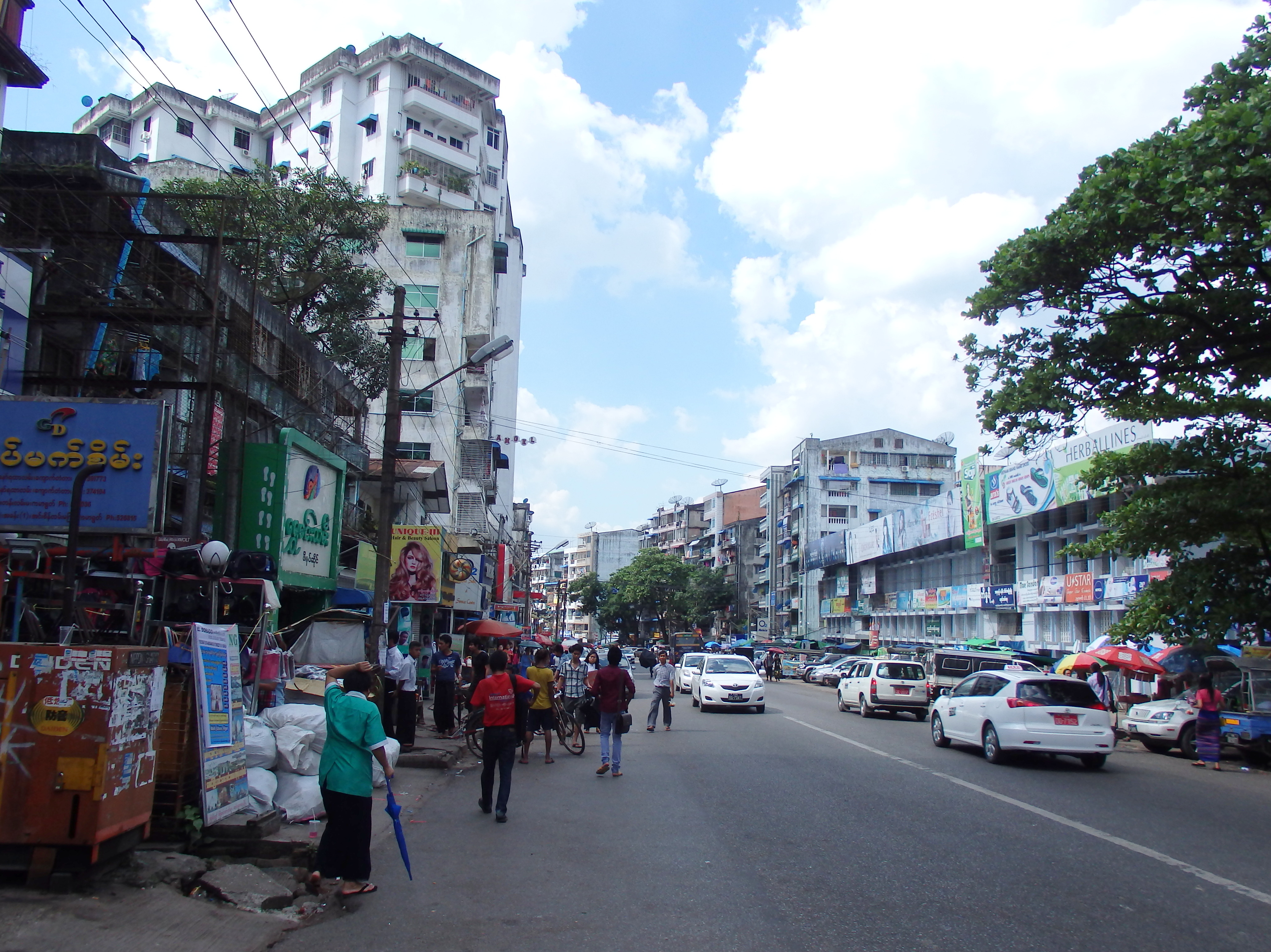
- Hledan market, Kamayut Township

- Location within Myanmar
- Coordinates: 16°49′15″N 96°8′0″E
- Country: Myanmar
- Region: Yangon Region
- City: Yangon
- District: Kamayut District

Area
  - Total: 6.2 km^{2} (2.40 sq mi)

Population (2000)
  - Total: 72,700
  - Density: 11,700/km^{2} (30,300/sq mi)
- Time zone: UTC6:30 (MST)
- Postal codes: 11041-11044
- Area codes: 1 (mobile: 80, 99)

Kamayut Township (Burmese: ကမာရွတ် မြို့နယ်, pronounced [kəmàjʊʔ mjo̰nɛ̀]; also spelt Kamaryut Township) is located in the north central part of Yangon. The township comprises ten wards, and shares borders with Hlaing township in the north, Hlaing township and Kyimyindaing township in the west, the Inya Lake, Bahan township and Mayangon township in the east, and Sanchaung township in the south.

One of the most prosperous areas in Yangon (a prime upmarket area), Kamayut is also the "college town" of the Yangon. Pyay Road which cuts across the township is lined with many education and media related institutions such as Myanmar Radio and Television headquarters. Yangon University, the University of Medicine 1, Yangon, the Yangon Institute of Economics, the Yangon Institute of Education and affiliated TTC and University of Distance Education, Yangon are all located in the township. The township has twelve primary schools, two middle schools and five high schools.

== Etymology ==
"Kamayut" derives from the Mon language term "Kamarot" (Mon: ကမာရတ်; /kəmaròt/), which means "lake of gems".

== Landmarks ==
The following is a list of landmarks protected by the city in Kamayut township.

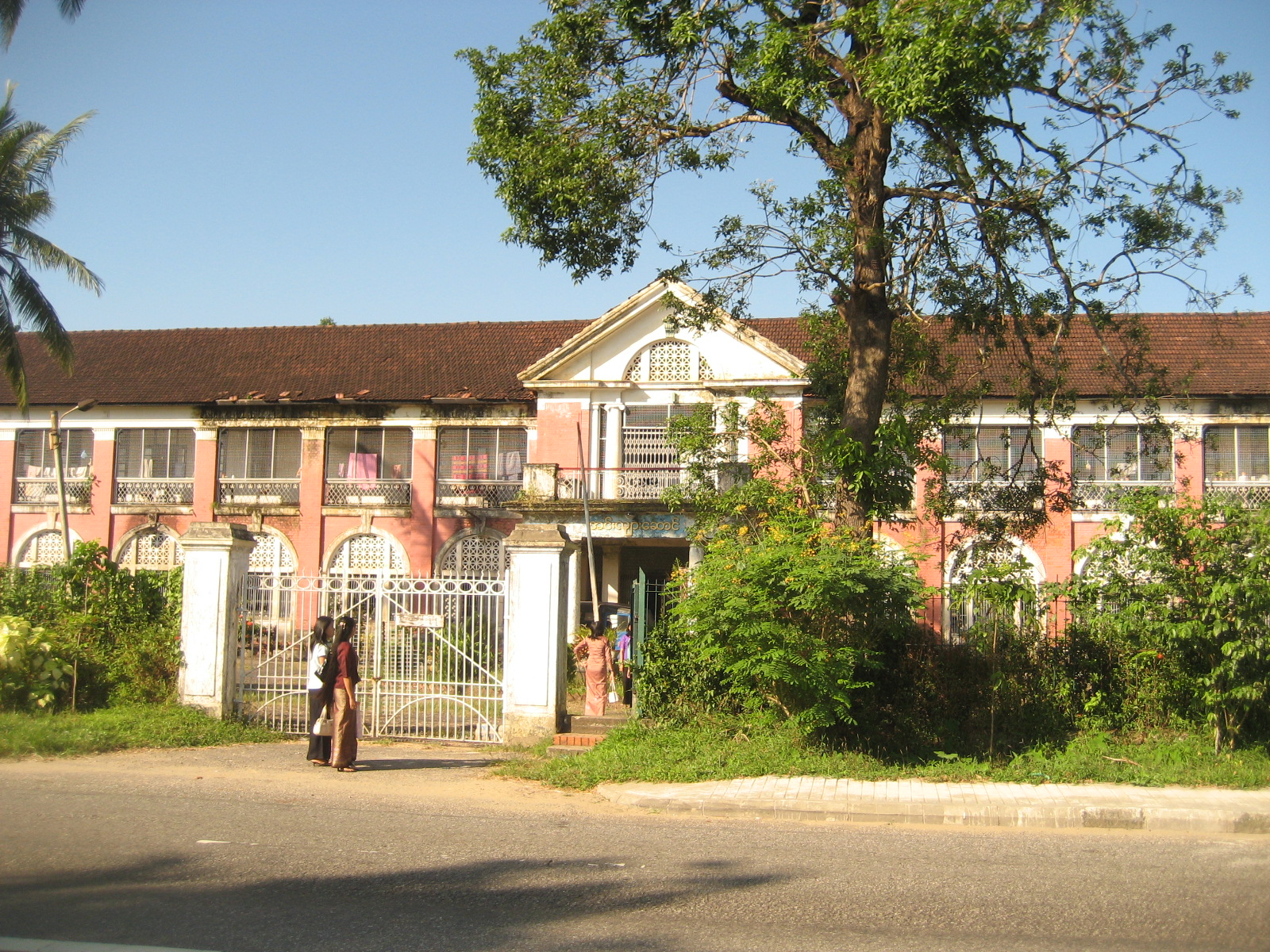
Inya Hall

Structure	Type	Address	Notes
Judson Chapel	Church	Yangon University Estate	
Universities Buddhist Center (Dhammayon)		University Avenue	
Universities Sanatorium		University Avenue	
Yangon University Arts Hall	University	Yangon University Estate	
Yangon University Ava Hall	University dormitory	Yangon University Estate	
Yangon University Bago Hall	University dormitory	Yangon University Estate	
Yangon University Convocation Hall	University	Yangon University Estate	
Yangon University Dagon Hall	University dormitory	Yangon University Estate	
Yangon University Inya Hall	University dormitory	Yangon University Estate	
Yangon University Nawaday Hall	University dormitory	Thaton Lane	
Yangon University Pinya Hall	University dormitory	Yangon University Estate	
Yangon University Pyay Hall	University dormitory	Pyay Road	
Yangon University Sagaing Hall	University dormitory	Yangon University Estate	
Yangon University Sciences Hall	University	Yangon University Estate	
Yangon University Sciences Hall	University	Yangon University Estate	
Yangon University Shwebo Hall	University dormitory	Yangon University Estate	
Yangon University Tagaung Hall	University dormitory	Pyay Road	
Yangon University Thaton Hall	University dormitory	Yangon University Estate	
Yangon University Thiri Hall	University dormitory	Yangon University Estate	

== Economy ==
Sinhmalike Market, formerly Kunchan Market, built in 1962, is the township's primary market. In 2010, the Yangon administration announced it would upgrade the market by building an eight-storey 69,720-square-foot (6,477 m^{2}) shopping center.

Kamayut Township is also home to Junction Square Centre, a 4-storey 300,000-square-foot (28,000 m^{2}) shopping centre on the corner of Pyay and Kyuntaw Roads and opened in March 2012. The Blazon Department Store is also located in the township.

The M&A Office Tower, a 17-storey office building, is expected to be completed in 2013.
