= Daw Kyan =

Burmese historian and writer (1918–2019)

Sithu Daw Kyan
- ကြန်
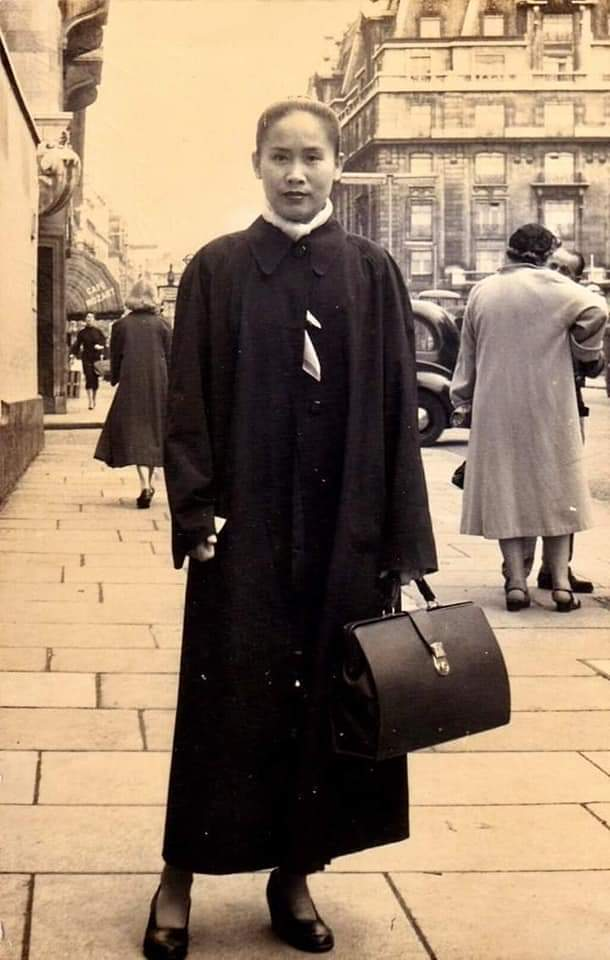
- Daw Kyan (1918–2019)
- Born: July 1, 1918; Thandwe, Thandwe Township, Rakhine State, British Burma
- Died: November 16, 2019 (aged 101); Hlaing Township, Yangon
- Occupations: Historian; Writer
- Parent(s): U Kyaw Tun (father); Daw Ngwe Hnit (mother)
- Awards: Medal (First Class) for Excellent Performance in the Field of Arts; Sithu Order; 2006 Myanmar National Literature Award for Lifetime Achievement

Academic background
- Education: MA (History)
- Alma mater: University of Yangon
- Thesis: (1959)

Academic work
- Discipline: Historian
- Institutions: Member of the Myanmar National Literature Awards Selection Committee, Pakokku U Ohn Pe Literary Awards Selection Committee and Myanmar Language Commission
- Main interests: History of Colonial Burma

Kyan (Burmese: ကြန်, pronounced [tɕàɰ̃]; 1 July 1918 – 16 November 2019), known honorifically as Daw Kyan (Burmese: ဒေါ်ကြန်, pronounced [dɔ̀ tɕàɰ̃]), was a Burmese historian and writer who specialized in the history of Burma under British colony. She received two civil orders, two lifetime achievement awards, six literary awards and three outstanding women awards, and was remembered as the Centenary History Devi of Burma.

She was a full-time member of the Myanmar Language Commission, and served also as a member of the Myanmar National Literature Awards Selection Committee and of Pakokku U Ohn Pe Literary Awards Selection Committee.

We will no longer have the proficient historians like Daw Kyan and Daw Yi Yi who devoted their lives to researches and writings regarding history.

— Than Tun

== Early life and career ==
Ma Kyan, the eldest of four siblings, was born on 1 July 1918 in Thandwe, Thandwe Township, Rakhine State to U Kyaw Tun and Daw Ngwe Hnit. Her father died when she was nine years old.

Kyan worked as a junior assistant teacher at the government high school in Thandwe where she passed the high school final exam in 1935. She later served as an upper division clerk at the post offices in Thandwe and Sittwe.

In 1951 when she was 32, Kyan continued her education at the special class of the University of Yangon in which she graduated within three years, and completed her master's degree in 1959. She joined as a part-time tutor at the Department of English Language and Literature of Yangon University for two years while she was a master's candidate. In 1956, she was appointed as a research officer in Burma Historical Commission. Kyan went to SOAS University of London to collect the Burmese historical documents in the following year. In 1959, with Daw Yi Yi, she went to the Victoria and Albert Museum and copied microfilms of rare parabaiks and the collections of Henry Burney and Edward Bosc Sladen. In 1963, she was promoted to a senior research officer.

Kyan was sent on Cultural Award Scheme tours to the major cities in Australia in 1977. She retired from the Burma Historical Commission in 1978.

== Later years ==
Kyan continued serving as an advisor to the Ministry of Industry No. 1, from 1986 to 1991, for the six-volume set The History of Myanmar Industrial Interprises.

In 1991, Kyan joined the Myanmar Language Commission as a full-time member. She also became a representative of Amyotha Hluttaw to draft new constitution of Myanmar in 1993.

From 2002 to 2005, Kyan was a member of steering committee for the doctorate program at History Department of Yangon University.

Kyan was awarded the Medal (First Class) for Excellent Performance in the Field of Arts in 2006 and the Sithu title, one of the highest civilian decoration, in 2012 by the Burmese government.

== Centenary and death ==
On 7 July 2018, Kyan's hundredth birthday was celebrated at the Sarpay Beikman hall in Yangon led by the Minister for Information, Pe Myint, and a book Centenary History Devi Sayamagyi Daw Kyan was released.

Kyan died on 16 November 2019 in room 202, No. 5, Yadanamon road, Hlaing Township, Yangon.

== Achievements ==
Award	Year	Nominated work
Myanmar National Literature Award	1976	The Condition of Myanmar (1885–1886)
Myanmar National Literature Award	2002	In Search of History and Other Articles
Myanmar National Literature Award	2003	Administration of Chief Commissioner (1886–1897)
Myanmar National Literature Award	2005	Village Administration Early Colonial Period (1886–1897)
Myanmar National Literature Award	2009	Revenue in Konbaung Period
Myanmar National Literature Award	2007	Lifetime Achievement Award for 2006
Outstanding Women Award	2003	
Outstanding Women Award	2005	
Outstanding Women Award	2007	
Pakokku U Ohn Pe Literary Award	2004	Life-long Literary Award
Public Service Outstanding Performance Badge	2006	Medal (First Class) for Excellent Performance in the Field of Arts
Pyidaungsu Sithu Thingaha Order	2012	Sithu Order
Tun Foundation Literary Award	2006	Selected Writings of Daw Kyan (Bilingual)

== Publications ==
Kyan had been writing historical books and research papers since the 1960s with the pen name Ma Kyan, and sometimes, Daw Kyan. In addition to the following publications, she also compiled Myanmar Encyclopedia Year books and Myanmar–English Dictionary.

1. Centenary History Devi Sayamagyi Daw Kyan (ရာပြည့်သမိုင်းဒေဝီ). Yangon: Seikkuu Cho Cho Press, 2018.
2. Chief Commissioner Administration 1886–1897 (မဟာဝန်ရှင်တော်မင်းကြီး အုပ်ချုပ်ရေး -၁၈၈၆-၁၈၉၇). Yangon: Yadanar Sarpay, 2003.
3. Condition of Myanmar (1885–86) (မြန်မာနိုင်ငံအခြေအနေ ၁၈၈၅–၈၆). Yangon: Sarpay Beikman Press, 1978.
4. The End of Feudalism in Myanmar (ပဒေသရာဇ်မြန်မာနိုင်ငံ၏ ဇာတ်သိမ်း). Yangon: Sarpaybeikman Press, 1981.
5. "The General Condition of the People of British Burma at the Time of the Deposition of King Thibaw" (သီပေါဘုရင်ပါတော်မူချိန် ဗြိတိသျှမြန်မာနိုင်ငံ အခြေအနေ). Burma Journal of Literary and Social Sciences 2, no. 2 (1969): 1–24.
6. "History of Our Burma (Myanmar) Historical Commission (1955–1984)" (ကျွန်မတို့ သမိုင်းကော်မရှင် သမိုင်း -၁၉၅၅-၁၉၈၄). Journal of Myanmar Historical Commission (1955–2005) for Diamond Jubilee, Yangon, Myanmar Historical Commission, 2006.
7. The Last Strength of Konbaung Period (ကုန်းဘောင်၏ နောက်ဆုံးအားမာန်). Yangon: Sarpay Lawka Press, 2004.
8. "Lord Dufferin’s Visit to Mandalay, 1886" (လောဒ်ဒဖရင် မန္တလေးသို့ ရောက်လာခဲ့စဉ်က -၁၈၈၆). Research in Myanmar History IV (1979): 161–7.
9. "Myanmar and Indian Press—1886–1887" (မြန်မာပြည် အိန္ဒိယ သတင်းစာများအာဘော် ၁၈၈၆–၁၈၈၇). Research in Myanmar History I (1977): 133–71.
10. Myanmar Diplomatic Mission to Bengal—AD 1830 (ဘင်္ဂလားသွား မြန်မာသံတော်အဖွဲ့ အေဒီ ၁၈၃၀). Yangon: Burma Historical Research Department, 1982, 177–201.
11. Myanmar Soldiers during Konbaung Period (ကုန်းဘောင်ခေတ် မြန်မာရဲမက်တော်များ). Yangon: Sarpay Lawka Press, 2006.
12. Organizations That Advocated for Occupation of Upper Burma (အထက်မြန်မာနိုင်ငံကို သိမ်းပိုက်ရန် လှုံ့ဆော်ခဲ့သူများ). Tetkathoe Pyin-nya Padetha Sar-saung, Vol. 3, Part 2, 1968, 201–24.
13. The Quest of History and Other Papers (သမိုင်းရှာပုံတော်ခရီးနှင့် အခြားစာတမ်းများ). Yangon: Myanmar Yadana Sarpay, 2002.
14. Revenue in Konbaung Period (ကုန်းဘောင်ခေတ် အခွန်တော်ရေးရာ). Yangon: Myanmar Book Centre, 2009.
15. Selected Writings of Daw Kyan (ဒေါ်ကြန်၏ လက်ရွေးစင်စာတမ်းများ). Yangon: Yangon Universities Press, Myanmar Historical Commission, 2005.
16. "Terminology of British Administration" (ဗြိတိသျှခေတ်အုပ်ချုပ်ရေးဆိုင်ရာ အခေါ်အဝေါ်များ -၁). Research in Myanmar History II (1978): 123–9.
17. "Terminology of British Administration" (ဗြိတိသျှခေတ်အုပ်ချုပ်ရေးဆိုင်ရာ အခေါ်အဝေါ်များ -၂). Research in Myanmar History III (1978): 25–77.
18. "Village Administration in Upper Burma during 1886-1887." Research in Myanmar History II (1975): 175–86.
19. "Village Administration of the Early Colonial Period (1886–1898)" (ကိုလိုနီခေတ်ဦး ကျေးရွာအုပ်ချုပ်ရေး). Yangon: Myanmar Yadana Press, 2005.
20. Westerners Who Had Relations with Myanmar History (မြန်မာ့သမိုင်းနှင့်ဆက်နွှယ်သော အနောက်နိုင်ငံသားများ). Yangon: Aungtagun Press, 2005.
21. What Is History and Other Papers (သမိုင်းဟူသည်နှင့် အခြားစာတမ်းများ). Yangon: Myanmar Yadana Sarpay, 2008.
22. Copper Bricks from the Shwedagon Pagoda (ရွှေတိဂုံစေတီတော်ကြီးမှ ကြေးအုတ်များ). Yangon: Department of Historical Research, 2007 (with Daw Yi Yi).
