= Burma studies =

Burma studies, or Myanmar studies is a grouping used in research universities around the world as a way of bringing together specialists from different disciplines such as history, cultural anthropology, archeology, religious studies, art history, political science, linguistics, and musicology, who are doing research in these areas focused on the geographical area of what is today the country of Burma or Myanmar, often using the Burmese language, or a language of one of its ethnic groups such as the Shan, Mon, Karen, Chin, or Kachin.

== Journals ==
The Journal of the Burma Research Society (JBRS) was the first academic journal devoted to Burma Studies. The journal started in 1911 about the same time as The Journal of the Siam Society and was published in Burma but is no longer published today. The Myanmar Historical Commission which was established in 1955 regularly publishes a journal and holds conferences in Burma.

Currently, outside of Burma (Myanmar) there are three peer-reviewed academic journals specialising in Burma studies, namely the Journal of Burma Studies, the SOAS Bulletin of Burma Research, and the Burma Economic Watch.

== Institutions ==
The Center for Burma Studies at Northern Illinois University is the national center for Burma studies in the United States and one of the only centers of its kind in the world, collecting Burmese art artifacts and hosting an archive or other Burmese materials. Its current director is Aurore Candier, Associate Professor of History at Northern Illinois University. The center publishes the Journal of Burma Studies, a joint publication made in collaboration with the Burma Studies Foundation and the Burma Studies Group of the Association for Asian Studies. It is the essential, and only, peer-reviewed academic journal regarding Burma studies.

There is also a lot of activity in Burma studies at the University of Michigan, Cornell University, L'Institut national des langues et civilisations orientales, the University of Hawaii, the National University of Singapore, Tokyo University of Foreign Studies, Kyoto University, Rutgers University, as well as in Universities and Institutes in Burma (Myanmar), such as Yangon University, Mandalay University, and the Historical Research Centre.

China is also a significant research centre for Burma studies due to its geographical proximity with the country, established in the 1950s in Beijing Foreign Studies University after the National College of Oriental Studies' institutional takeover by the People's Republic of China in Chenggong, Yunnan in 1949. Early scholars such as the Burma-born Chinese Ren Zhugen (1922–1991) initiated a project to translate the Hmannan Yazawin under the advice from orientalist Ji Xianlin, and was not completed until 2007. The planning for the transnational Sino-Myanmar pipelines facilitated the establishment for the Centre for Burma Studies at Yunnan University in 2002, which has had strategic collaboration between the East Asian Institute at National University of Singapore and the Center for Strategy and International Studies since 2010.

The Burma Studies Group of the Association for Asian Studies maintains the Burma studies e-list, created in March 2013 for the purpose of facilitating communication within the community of international scholars active in Burma/Myanmar-related studies.

The School of Oriental and African Studies (SOAS) in London was the first institution of higher education outside of Burma to have many faculty specialising in Burma Studies. Specialists in the Burmese language and literature included the scholars Hla Pe, John Okell, Anna Allot and in the history of Burma the historian D.G.E. Hall. Harry Leonard Shorto specialised in Mon language and literature. The late historian of Burma U Than Tun received his doctorate in history at SOAS. Many current specialists in Burma and its languages and ethnic groups received their doctorates at SOAS such as the historians Victor B. Lieberman and the Mon linguist Christian Bauer.

== Name ==
Despite the name of the country having been changed to "Myanmar" by the military junta, most universities outside of Burma (Myanmar) still refer to this academic focus as "Burma studies" reflecting the contested status of the name "Myanmar" outside of the country.

== See also ==
- Sarpay Beikman
- Burmese Encyclopedia
- F. K. Lehman
- Tilman Frasch
- Gordon Luce
- Miemie Winn Byrd

== Externalinksks ==
- Center for Burma Studies, Northern Illinois University
- Burma Research at the School of Oriental and African Studies
- Journal of Burma Studies
- SOAS Bulletin of Burma Research
