= Chen Yi-sein =

Sino-Burmese scholar (1924–2005)

- Born: 1924; Pyapon, Irrawaddy Division, British Burma
- Died: 23 March 2005 (aged 80–81); Taipei, Taiwan
- Other name: Yi Sein

Academic work
- Era: 1950s-2000s
- Main interests: Burmese history

Chen Yi-sein (Burmese: ရည်စိန်; Chinese: 陳孺性; Jyutping: can4 jyu4 sing3; 8 January 1924 – 23 March 2005) was a Sino-Burmese scholar who specialized in Burma–China relations from the mid-1950s until his death in March 2005. He was proficient in Burmese, Chinese and English. He was one of the first members of the Burma Historical Commission when it was established by U Kaung in January 1955. Chen served the commission from 1956 until 1987.

Chen was born in Pyapon, Irrawaddy Division, British Burma on 8 January 1924. A fourth generation Sino-Burmese, Chen's forebears came from Taishan, Guangdong. He died in Taipei, Taiwan on 23 March 2005.

During World War II, Chen served as a translator for the Allied Forces. Following the war, he served as a history researcher and lecturer at Rangoon University.

In December 2012, Thaw Kaung published a book, The Selected Writings of U Yi Sein, a compilation of Chen's writings, including 28 Burmese articles and 7 English articles on Burmese history from the 1st to 20th centuries, with a focus on Sino-Burmese relations and Chinese records of the Pyu people.

== Publications ==
The following list is taken from The Selected Writings of U Yi Sein.

- The Chinese Inscription at Pagan, The Bulletin of Burma Historical Commission, 1 (2): 153–7, 1960.
- 緬北的金地珊族 (The Khamti Shan in Northern Burma), 南洋文摘 (South Seas Digest), 2(1): 33 (under the name of 田稼青 (Tian Jia-qing), the pen name of Chen Yi-sein), 1961.
- 緬甸吉耶族人的銅鼓-蛙鼓 (The Bronze Drum of the Kayah People in Burma), 南洋文摘 (South Seas Digest), 2(1): 39, 1961.
- 緬甸的五座華僑廟宇 (Five Chinese Temples in Burma), 南洋文摘 (South Seas Digest), 2(4): 36, 1961.
- '緬甸'考 (A Study of 'Mian-dian'), 南洋文摘 (South Seas Digest), 2(7): 39–40, 1961.
- 蒲甘華文古碑之迷 (The Mystery of the Chinese Inscription at Bagan), 南洋文摘 (South Seas Digest), 2(8): 36–7, 1961.
- 古代中緬交通孔道 (An Ancient Communication Routes between China and Burma), 南洋文摘 (South Seas Digest), 2(11): 17–8, 1961.
- 景棟境內的拉祜族 (The Lahu People in Keng-tung), 南洋文摘 (South Seas Digest), 2(12): 42, 1961.
- 緬甸華僑最早的報刊 (The Earliest Chinese Newspaper in Burma), 南洋文摘 (South Seas Digest), 2(12): 48–9, 1961.
- 緬甸最早的華僑學校 (The Earliest Chinese School in Burma), 南洋文摘 (South Seas Digest), 2(12): 53, 1961.
- 緬甸古代的錢幣 (Ancient Coinage in Burma), 南洋文摘 (South Seas Digest), 3(2): 36–37, 1962.
- 八莫 '威遠營' 碑文上的 '金沙' 與 '鬼窟' (The Words 'Jinsha' and 'Guiku' in the 'Wei-yuan Ying' Inscription at Bhamo), 南洋文摘 (South Seas Digest), 3(2): 54, (under the name of 田稼青 (Tian Jia-qing)), 1962.
- 模範緬華大辭典 (A Model Burmese-Chinese Dictionary), Rangoon, 1962.
- 袖珍緬華辭典 (Poket Burmese-Chinese Dictionary), Rangoon, 1963.
- 緬甸史與蠻書 (Burma History and Man-Shu), 南洋文摘 (South Seas Digest), 4(11): 28–9, 1963.
- The Chinese in Upper Burma before A. D. 1700, Journal of Southeast Asian Researches 2: 81–94, 1966.
- The Chinese Revolution of 1911 and the Chinese in Burma, Journal of Southeast Asian Researches 2: 95–102, 1966.
- 樊綽蠻書對緬甸史之貢獻 (The Contribution of Fan Chuo's Man Shu to the Study of Burma History), Journal of Southeast Asian Researches 3: 17–26, 1967.
- 緬甸中部毗濕奴城遺址的發現 (Discovery of Vishnu City in Central Burma), Journal of Southeast Asian Researches 3: 83–84, 1968.
- (History of Burma in the Man-Shu), (Mandalay University Annual Magazine 1968–1969), 1:37-9, 1969.
- 明初之中緬關係 (Sino-Burmese Relations in the Early Ming (1368-1424), Part I, 鹿児島大学史錄 (Kagoshima Daigaku Shiroku), 2:1-32, 1969.
- 明初之中緬關係 (Sino-Burmese Relations in the Early Ming (1368-1424), Part II, 鹿児島大学史錄 (Kagoshima Daigaku Shiroku), 3:11-28, 1970.
- (Ancient Tibeto-Burmans and the Routes of their Migration), (Mandalay Arts and Science University Annual Magazine 1969–1970), 2:119-26, 1970.
- 朱波考 (The Study of 'Zhu-Bo'), 東南亞研究 (Journal of Southeast Asian Research Centre), 6: 97–105, 1970.
- 模範緬華大辭典 (A Model Burmese-Chinese Dictionary), Reprint, Tokyo, 1970.
- 元至元末年的中緬和平談判 (The Sino-Burmese Peace Negotiation in the Late Zhi-Yuan Period of the Yuan Dynasty), Part I, 鹿児島大学史錄 (Kagoshima Daigaku Shiroku), 5:1-16, 1972.
- 元至元末年的中緬和平談判 (The Sino-Burmese Peace Negotiation in the Late Zhi-Yuan Period of the Yuan Dynasty), Part II, 鹿児島大学史錄 (Kagoshima Daigaku Shiroku), 7:23-31, 1974.
- 元至元末年的中緬和平談判 (The Sino-Burmese Peace Negotiation in the Late Zhi-Yuan Period of the Yuan Dynasty), Part III, 鹿児島大学史錄 (Kagoshima Daigaku Shiroku), 8:17-26, 1975.
- ရှင်ဒိသာပါမေက္ခ ငြိမ်းချမ်းရေး မစ်ရှင် (Shin Disapamokkha's Peace Mission), (Researches in Burmese History 1, Historical Research Department, Ministry of Culture), 1:41-57, 1977.
- (The Pyu Mission to China in 802 AD), (Researches in Burmese History 3, Historical Research Department, Ministry of Culture), 3:1-65, 1979.
- (Burma Foreign Relations during the Pyu Period), (Researches in Burmese History 4, Historical Research Department, Ministry of Culture), 4:1-39, 1979.
- The Chinese in Upper Burma before 1700, Silver Jubilee Publication, Historical Research Department, Ministry of Culture, Aug 1982: 1-21, 1982 (Reprinted from Journal of Southeast Asian Research Centre, Singapore 2: 81-93, 1966.)
- The Chinese in Rangoon during the 18th and 19th Centuries, Silver Jubilee Publication, Historical Research Department, Ministry of Culture, Aug 1982: 171–6, 1982. (Reprinted from Ba Shin, Jean Boisselier, and A B Griswold (ed): Essays Offered to G. H. Luce by his Colleagues and Friends in honour of His Seventy-fifth Birthday, Artibus Asiae, Vol 1:107-11, 1966.
- (The Origins of the Names Cina, Gandalarit, Udibwa and Tarok-Tarak), (Nyan-Lin Dhamma Literature), 1:127-9, 1983.
- (The Geography of Pyu in the 9th Century AD), (Nyan-Lin Dhamma Literature), 2:107-13, 1983.
- 仰光廣東公司（觀音古廟）史略，緬甸仰光廣東公司觀音古廟160週年紀念特刊：4-16, 1984.
- (Which is the Pyu Capital in the 8th/9th Century AD: Han Lin or Sri Ksetra, (Nyan-Lin Dhamma Literature), 10:217-230, 1984.
- (Locations of some Pyu Stockades), (Nyan-Lin Dhamma Literature), 14:95-100, 14:178-184, 1984.
- (Names of the Pyu Country Known to Ancient Chinese in the Period between 2nd Century BC to 4th Century AD), (Nyan-Lin Dhamma Literature), 15:167-8, 1984.
- (Location of Suvannabhumi), (Nyan-Lin Dhamma Literature), 19:130-40, 1985.
- (Myet-hna-mae in Burmese History), (Moe-Wai Magazine), 212:136-8, 1985.
- (Note on a Name of Ancient Burma in Chinese Records: The Origins of the Name 'Zhu-Bo', (Burma Historical Research Journal), 5:7-22, 1985.
- ပျူစောထီး သုတေသန (Study of Pyu-saw-hti), (Moe-Wai Magazine), 214:76-79, 215:122-126, 1986.
- မျက်နှာမည်း (The Study of "Mien-hna Me"), မိုးဝေ မဂ္ဂဇင်း (Moe-Wai Magazine),
- မန်ရှူးကျမ်း မြန်မာပြန် (Translation of Man-Shu), မိုးဝေ မဂ္ဂဇင်း (Moe-Wai Magazine), 216:99-102, 217:81-4, 218:61-4, 219:170-2, 220:179-82, 221:195-8, 222:159-62, 223:77-80, 224:121-4, 225:155-8, 226:77-80, 227:57-60, 228:157-60, 229:129-32, 230:153-6, 231:153-5, 232:147-50, 233:155-7, 1986–7.
- (A Brief History of Panlone Panthay), (Mahaythi Magazine) 31:112-8, 1987.
- Review of Phases of Pre-Pagan Burma: Language and History, Journal of the Royal Asiatic Society of Great Britain and Ireland, 1:237-9, 1988.
- 對伯希和兩道考內有關驃國的商榷 (Discussion on a Passage Regarding a Route in the Pyu Kingdom in Pelliot's 'Deux itinéraires de Chine en Inde à la fin du VIIIe siècle), 大陸雜誌 (The Continent Magazine), 83(3):115-22, 1991.
- '撣國'考 (Study of the 'Shan Kingdom'), 大陸雜誌 (The Continent Magazine), 83(4):145-8, 1991.
- 大德初年元軍圍攻木連城考 (A Study of the Yuan Army's Siege of Myin-saing City in the Early Years of the Reign of Da-de), 大陸雜誌 (The Continent Magazine), 83(6):26-39, 1991.
- 關於 '驃越'、'盤越' 與 '滇越' 的考釋 (On the Study of 'Piao-yue', 'Pan-yue' and 'Dian-yue'), 大陸雜誌 (The Continent Magazine), 84(5):193-202, 1991.
- 中國載籍內驃國史料的研究 (Research on Chinese Historical Sources on the Pyu Kingdom), 大陸雜誌 (The Continent Magazine), ... ... ... ... , 1991.
- '緬甸'考 (A Study of 'Mian-dian'), In 中國載籍內驃國史料的研究 (Research on Chinese Historical Sources on the Pyu Kingdom), (A modified version of Chen Yi-sein 1961) ... ... .
- 夫甘都盧與黃支 (Fu-gan-du-lu and Huang-zhi), In 中國載籍內驃國史料的研究 (Research on Chinese Historical Sources on the Pyu Kingdom), 1991 ... ... ... .
- 漢唐至宋元時期在緬甸的華人 (Chinese in Burma from Han-Tang through Song-Yuan Period), 海外華人研究 2:41-57, 1992.
- A Brief History of Overseas Chinese in Rangoon (仰光華僑史略)
- A History of Overseas Chinese in Burma (緬甸華僑史話)
