= Thittila =

Burmese Buddhist monk and missionary

Ashin Thittila
- အရှင် သေဋ္ဌိလ
- Title: Sayadaw

Personal life
- Born: Maung Khin; 10 July 1896 Badigon village, Pyawbwe Township, Mandalay Division, British Burma
- Died: 3 January 1997 (aged 100)
- Education: Dhammācariya
- Occupation: Buddhist monk

Religious life
- Religion: Buddhism
- School: Theravada
- Monastic name: Seṭṭhilābhivaṃsa သေဋ္ဌိလာဘိဝံသ

Senior posting
- Teacher: Addiccavaṃsa
- Awards: Agga Maha Pandita (1956); Abhidhajamahāraṭṭhaguru (1990); Abhidhajaaggamahāsaddhammajotika (1993)

Ashin Thittila or Seṭṭhilābhivaṃsa (Burmese: အရှင် သေဋ္ဌိလ (သို့) သေဋ္ဌိလာဘိဝံသ; pronounced [t̪ɪʔtʰḭla̰]; Pali: Seṭṭhilābhivaṃsa), commonly known as U Thittila, was a Burmese Theravada Buddhist monk, who was also a scholar of Buddhist literature and meditation teacher. He is said to be the first religious worker among the Burmese monks who left for a foreign country to do Buddhist missionary work. He lived for 14 consecutive years in England.

He served as a lecturer on the Buddhist philosophy known as Abhidhamma at the University of Yangon, took part in compiling the Burmese-English dictionary, jointly working with Dr. Hla Pe, and wrote books in English and Burmese. He was the first to translate the Vibhaṅga, the second part of the Abhidhamma Pitaka, from Pali to English for the first time. He also worked as a librarian at the Adyar Library of Theosophical Society Adyar and the library of the Buddhist Society in London.

== Biography ==
=== Youth ===
Thittila was born in 1896, in Badigon village, Pyawbwe Township in Myanmar, to parents, U Aye and Daw Htwe, who earned their living as farmers. Mg Khin, was his birth name. From the age of seven, he would visit the village monastery, known as Badigon Vihara, where he learnt Buddhist scriptures from the abbot Sayadaw U Kavinda. This abbott took him to Mandalay to hear a sermon on Abhidhamma. After this experience, he decided to enter the monkhood.

=== Early studies and monkhood ===
When he reached fifteen, he was ordained a novice (samanera) and knew a few Buddhist Suttas and other scriptures. In 1916, his full ordination occurred in Mawlamyine, under Sayadaw U Okkantha, who was his preceptor.

Before his full ordination, he studied under the guidance of Sayadaw Ashin Adiccavamsa, a scholar lecturing at Masoyein monastery in Mandalay. He succeeded in obtaining the Pathamagyaw title in 1918, after he ranked first in the Pathamagyi examination. In 1923, he passed the Sakyasīha examination held by the Pariyattisasanahita Association in Mandalay, one of four candidates who passed that year of the one hundred and fifty who partook. Because passing this exam is the condition for the honorific suffix of abhivamsa, his name became Thitilabivamsa.

Afterwards he became the abbot of a monastery of three hundred monks and took charge of the education department of a monastery in Yangon, established by his teacher Ashin Adiccavamsa.

He also studied Buddhist scriptures under various scholar monks, both in Mandalay and Yangon. At that time, the monastic community held firmly to conservative views that condemned a monk's learning English, which was not thought to be proper academic work for a monk. However, Thittila did begin to learn English and came to understand English grammar to some extent.

=== Studies abroad ===
Thittila travelled to India for the sole purpose of learning Sanskrit and English in 1924. While studying at Shantiniketan University, India, he had to return to Myanmar because of health issues. On his return, his preceptor, Sayadaw Adiccavamsa, set off for India and England for further studies. During his teacher's absence, Thittila took charge of the monastery. Six years after his return from India, he made plans to go abroad to learn English, but this time he chose to go to Ceylon (now Sri Lanka), where he spent two years. He then moved to Madras (now Chennai), India around 1934.

In Adyar, he first studied English with English people. There was a section of Theosophical Society in Adyar, and he made several attempts to becoming a member and stay there in order to learn English. Although, at first he was denied membership, he was eventually approved by its Yangon branch. Soon he became its librarian, where he had a chance to learn library science, a useful skill for managing a large monastery.

During his stay there, he was elected president of the South India Buddhist Associations .

To improve his English and to study English methods of education, especially of children, he travelled to England in 1938. While there he was invited by the secretary of London Buddhist Society to giv a sermon on Dhamma. Despite his limited knowledge of English on arriving, his language skills were, by then, sufficient to deliver talks to an English audience. He delivered a second talk at the Sorbonne University in Paris, entitled ‘World Fellowship Through Buddhism', at the invitation of Sir Francis Younghusband, president and founder of the World Congress of Faiths.

=== Second World War ===
Unlike many people from Myanmar who had travelled to England for their studies, and who returned to their homeland, Thittila remained in England. As the war worsened, he eventually lost contact with anyone in Myanmar and ran out of money to live on. Soon thereafter, an unidentified Christian clergyman offered him food and shelter; when the air raids on London intensified, the two moved to Somerset, where the clergyman had a house, to seek safety. Thittila remained there until the end of the war. During this time, he performed voluntary work as a medical attendant for the injured.

BBC service in Burmese began in 1940, it was broadcast for a quarter of an hour daily. Thittila participated in this broadcasting for two years.

Just after the war, in May 1946, he participated in compiling a Burmese-English Dictionary led by Dr. Steward, along with Dr. Hla Pe.

=== Missionary Work in England ===
When the war ended, he resumed delivering talks; he gave two series of seventeen talks at Workers' Educational Association.

When the London Buddhist Society was restored at the end of the war, Christmas Humphreys, president of the society, organized some of his talks. Humphreys wrote about Ashin Thittila :

"The bhikkhu Thittila became of more and more service to the Society, foreshadowing the time when, in September 1947 he would be able to give it whole time, and became one of the leading figures in English Buddhism"

A group of nine Burmese Kappiya (lay manciples) created a monastery called the Sasana Vihara in London to support Ashin Thittila . According to Claudine W. Iggleden, he carried out two hundred and fifty teaching engagements from March of 1949 to March of 1951.

=== Return to Myanmar ===
In 1952, Thittia returned to Myanmar to teach Abhidamma studies at the University of Yangon. Thittila at first accepted the appointment for six months or one year but wound up lecturing for eight consecutive years. The issue of his salary was contentious because, as a monk, Thittila could not work for money. As such, the university donated his salary as alms.

In 1964, Thittila translated the second part of Abhidhamma Pitaka, Vibhaṅga, which was published as "The Book of Analysis'" by the Pali Text Society in 1969.

=== Return to England and Death ===
Again in 1982, at the age of 86 or 87, Thittila returned to England. He lived at a house in a village near Reading. While he gave some talks in Oxford and Manchester, he became increasingly reclusive, though he did make one journey to Scotland to speak.

At the age of 100, he died on January 3, 1997.

== Activities on Dhamma ==
=== Talks Given ===
His first talk on Dhamma took place in 1938 at Buddhist Society of London. His second such talk, under the title of 'World Fellowship Through Buddhism', was at Sorbonne University in Paris, France. After the second world war, he gave a number of talks at Workers' Educational Association and at several schools.

At the invitation of the Association for Asian Studies at the University of Michigan, US, Thittila travelled around the United States in 1959 and gave more than one hundred and sixty lectures at numerous universities and other meetings planned for that purpose, over the course of six months. At Honolulu University alone, he delivered twelve talks, of which ten were on Abhidhamma. He also spoke in Toronto, Canada.

Thittila travelled to Australia three times after his missionary work in England. In April 1954, he arrived in Australia for the first time and spoke at Sydney University, where about three hundred students as attendees came to listen with interest.

His second journey to Australia took place from May 19, 1956 to June 14, 1956 and his last from December 29, 1963 to February 14, 1964. He delivered many talks during these visits.

Thittila also toured Japan, where he observed Zen Buddhism and meditation techniques and met with Zen masters. He visited many other Asian countries to do religious work, including Singapore, Hongkong, Indonesia, Cambodia, Nepal, and Thailand. Thittila also visited European countries including Belgium, Switzerland, Italy, Germany, Holland. Norway, Sweden, Denmark, and France to give talks on invitation.

=== Courses Taught ===
- Pali language: This course included "A Practical Grammar of the Pali Language" by Charles Duroiselle and "The new Pali course" by Polwatte Buddhadatta Thera as textbooks. It involved a reading of the Visuddhimagga alongside its English translation as well as texts from the Majjhima Nikāya.
- Nikāya: This course bagan with the Majjhima Nikāya and proceeded to the Dīgha Nikāya.
- Abhidhamma: This course included the texts "Abhidhamma Compendium" by U Shwe Zan Aung and "A Manual of Abhidhamma" by Bikkhu Narada. Thittila is thought to be the first teacher of Abhidhamma in the West.
- Meditation: This cours involved the teaching of two types of meditation techniques: Samatha (tranquility) and Vipassanā (insight).

== Honors ==
In 1956, he received a Buddhist honorific title Agga Maha Pandita, which was the only title for monks annually awarded by the British colonial government from 1915 to 1942. In the year 1990, the government of Myeanmar conferred on him the title of Abhidhajamahāraṭṭhaguru. He received another Buddhist missionary title, Abhidhajaaggamahāsaddhammajotika, from the government in 1993.

During his stay in Myanmar (1966-1982), he became 'Ovādacariya Sayadaw' (the elder and advisor) in Sangha Mahanayaka.

He was a trustee monk of the Shwedagon Pagoda, Sule Pagoda, and Kaba Aye Pagoda. He was also the examiner of the Abhidhamma Propagation Society in Yangon.

== Bibliography ==
- The Path of the Buddha for second chapter
- The Book of Analysis (Vibhanga)
- A Buddhist's Companion: An Exposition and Selected Quotations of Ashin Thittila
- Essential Themes of Buddhist Lectures Given by Ashin Thittila
- Dhammapada (Pali, Myanmar and English) for part of Myanmar translation
