= Royal Historical Commission of Burma =

Historical research commission of the Konbaung Dynasty of Burma

Royal Historical Commission
- Formation: 11 May 1829
- Type: Historical research
- Headquarters: Inwa Palace (1829–1832); Mandalay Palace (1867–1869)
- Location(s): Inwa (1829–1832) Mandalay (1867–1869)
- Head: Monywe Zetawun Sayadaw (1829–1832)
- Patron: King Bagyidaw (1829–1832); King Mindon (1867–1869)

The Royal Historical Commission (Burmese: တော်ဝင် မြန်မာနိုင်ငံ သမိုင်း ကော်မရှင်, [tɔ̀wìɰ̃ mjəmà nàɪɰ̃ŋàɰ̃ θəmáɪɰ̃ kɔ̀məʃìɰ̃]) of the Konbaung Dynasty of Burma (Myanmar) produced the standard court chronicles of the Konbaung era, Hmannan Yazawin (1832) and Dutiya Yazawin (1869).

== Commission (1829–1832) ==
In May 1829, three years after the disastrous First Anglo-Burmese War (1824–1826), King Bagyidaw created the first Royal Historical Commission to write an official chronicle of Konbaung Dynasty. The standard official chronicle at the time was Maha Yazawin (The Great Chronicle), the standard chronicle of Toungoo Dynasty that covers from time immemorial to October 1711. It was the second attempt by Konbaung kings to update Maha Yazawin. The first attempt, Yazawin Thit (The New Chronicle), commissioned by Bagyidaw's predecessor and grandfather Bodawpaya, had not been accepted because the new chronicle contained severe criticisms of earlier chronicles. Although it was Bodawpaya himself who had ordered the author of Yazawin Thit, Twinthin Taikwun, to verify the accuracy of Maha Yazawin by consulting a variety of sources including hundreds of inscriptions, the king did not accept the new chronicle when it was presented to him.

The members of the commission consisted of learned monks, court historians and court Brahmins: The commission first convened for the first time on 11 May 1829 (1st waxing of Nayon 1191 ME). Three years and four months later, the commission had brought up the history to 1821, producing Hmannan Yazawin.

Name	Description	Responsibility
Monywe Zetawun Sayadaw	Chief Abbot of Monywe Zetawun Monastery	Head of the Commission; Consulting editor; responsible for verifying Maha Yazawin and Yazawin Thit
Thawkabin Sayadaw	Chief Abbot of Thawkabin Monastery	Consulting editor; responsible for verifying Maha Yazawin and Yazawin Thit
Maha Dhamma Thingyan	Minister councilor to the king	Responsible for verifying Maha Yazawin and Yazawin Thit
U Yauk	Minister of the Royal Cavalry	Responsible for checking minor chronicles and poems
U Chein	Royal Messenger	Responsible for checking minor chronicles and poems
U Maung	Liaison to Privy Council	
Thiri Maha Nanda Thingyan	Deputy Minister, Governor of Hsaw	
U Wa	Deputy Minister, Governor of Singu	
Zayadewa	Court Brahmin	Responsible for checking Indian sources for ceremonial customs of the court
Kamondra	Court Brahmin	Responsible for checking Indian sources for ceremonial customs of the court
U Hpyaw	Court scribe	Chief Scribe
Lu Gyi	Court scribe	Scribe
Aung Tha	Court scribe	Scribe

== Commission (1867–1869) ==
The second commission was formed in 1867. It was about 15 years after an even more disastrous Second Anglo-Burmese War (1852), and about a year after a serious rebellion that killed Crown Prince Kanaung Mintha. A shaken King Mindon commissioned another committee of scholars to update Hmannan. The commission consisted of five members—senior court officials, a librarian, and a scribe. Whereas the first commission had stopped short of the First Anglo-Burmese War, the second commission had no choice but to tackle the two disastrous wars that had their dismembered kingdom on the brink. The commission updated the chronicle up to 1854, right after the second war. The Second Chronicle's account of the two wars, according to historian Htin Aung, was "written with the objectivity of a true historian, and the great national defeats were described faithfully in detail." The second chronicle in ten volumes was completed in 1869.

== See also ==
- Burma Research Society
- Myanmar Historical Commission
