= Myanmar–English Dictionary =

Bilingual dictionary Myanmar-English

Myanmar–English Dictionary (Burmese: မြန်မာ-အင်္ဂလိပ်အဘိဓာန်) is a modern Government project in Myanmar (formerly Burma), first published in 1993 by the Government of Myanmar's Myanmar Language Commission.

It is a guide dictionary for translating between English and the Myanmar Language. It was written by the members of the Myanmar Language Commission and the two Myanmar–English Dictionary Work Committees who participated in the compilation of this dictionary.

== Myanmar–English Dictionary Work Committee (1) ==
1. U Ba Nyunt, Member of the Myanmar Language Commission, Chairman (Deceased)
2. U Htin Gyi, Member of the Myanmar Language Commission, Member
3. Daw Kyan, Member of the Myanmar Language Commission, Member
4. Dr.Than Htun, Member of the Myanmar Language Commission, Member
5. U Thaw Kaung, Librarian, Universities' Library, Member
6. U Thi Ha, Retired Professor of English, Member
7. Staff members, Department of the Myanmar Language Commission

== Myanmar–English Dictionary Work Committee (2) ==
1. Hla Shwe, Member of the Myanmar Language Commission, Chairman
2. Htin Fatt, Member of the Myanmar Language Commission, Member
3. Daw Myint Than, Member of the Myanmar Language Commission, Member
4. Than Htut, Member of the Myanmar Language Commission, Member
5. Win Pe, Member of the Myanmar Language Commission, Member
6. Hla Mae, Retired Lecturer in English, Member (Deceased)
7. Hpwa Yin, Retired Lecturer in English, Member
8. Khin Kyi Kyi, Retired Lecturer in English, Member
9. Khin Mae, Retired Lecturer in English, Member
10. Ko Ko, Retired Secretary, Myanmar Red Cross Society, Member (Deceased)
11. Myint Kyi "Tekkatho Myat Soe", Member
12. Staff members, Department of the Myanmar Language Commission

== History of the earlier Burmese–English dictionaries ==
=== Judson's dictionary ===
The first Burmese–English dictionary compiled by Adoniram Judson appeared in 1826 and later in 1849 the second edition was published, which was better and more complete than the former edition. But it was enlarged by E.C Stevenson in 1893, with illustrative examples. Another one who made the expanded edition in 1921 was F.H. Eveleth but he removed valuable examples out of it.

=== A Burmese–English Dictionary ===
A Burmese–English Dictionary publications
Publication date	Part	Title	Chief compiler(s)
1941	Part 1	A Burmese–English Dictionary	J. A. Stewart; C. W. Dunn
1950	Part 2	A Burmese–English Dictionary	C. W. Dunn; Hla Pe (co-ed.)
1956	Part 3	A Burmese–English Dictionary	C. W Dunn; H. F. Searle; Hla Pe
1962	Part 4	A Burmese–English Dictionary	H. F. Searle; A. J. Allott; Hla Pe
1969	Part 5	A Burmese–English Dictionary	A. J. Allott; J. W. A. Okell; Hla Pe (joint-ed.)
1981	Part 6	A Burmese–English Dictionary	A. J. Allott; J. W. A. Okell; Hla Pe (joint-ed.)

Hla Pe, professor of Burmese at the University of London (1948–1980), worked with others on the A Burmese–English Dictionary project, which began in 1925 under the aegis of the Burma Research Society, was continued at the University of Rangoon and then the School of Oriental and African Studies (London). This small group completed 6 volumes of the dictionary, each 80 large-format pages, but it remains incomplete. Other participants were J. A. Stewart, C. W. Dunn, J.S. Furnivall, Gordon H Luce, Charles Duroiselle, Anna Allott, John Okell and, from the United States, R. Halliday and A. C. Hanna.

Oxford English Dictionary 4th editor C. T. Onions said "A lexicographer's life is a dog's life, but a lexicographer generally lives to an old age". This is true of several contributors to these Burmese dictionaries.
