= Richard Sprigg =

Richard Sprigg may refer to:

- Richard Sprigg Jr. (c. 1769–1806), American lawyer, jurist and politician
- Richard Keith Sprigg (1922–2011), British linguist
