= Emma Larkin =

American journalist

Emma Larkin is the pseudonym of an anonymous American journalist and author.

== Biography ==
Portrait from her 2021 novel Comrade Aeon's Guide to Bangkok

Born in The Philippines to an American mother, her family moved to Thailand when she was one year old, where she lived for the next nine years. At least part of this time was spent in Bangkok, where she has lived as an adult since at least 2003. Larkin was educated in the UK from the age of ten, at least partly at boarding school, and in 1999 completed a Master's degree in Southeast Asian History from London University's School of Oriental and African Studies, where she also studied the Burmese language. Her thesis, about British censorship in colonial Burma was published in the Journal of Burma Studies in 2003. Larkin has given conflicting accounts of her early years, for instance telling interviewers that she has lived in Thailand her whole life.

== Journalism in Myanmar ==
Larkin first travelled to Myanmar in 1995, and began entering the country for the purposes of journalism since around the year 2000, when, from her base in Bangkok, Larkin began researching and reporting on the military dictatorship that ruled the country. She is known for her coverage of Myanmar and George Orwell's experience within it in her debut book, Finding George Orwell in Burma. Speaking to the Democratic Voice of Burma, Larkin stated that she began that book in 2002 and travelled back and forth between Bangkok and Myanmar over the next two or three years. The only way this could be accomplished at the time was by fraudulently using business visas that entitled her to stay in Myanmar for months at a time. As a cover story to hide her journalistic work in the country, she received business visas under the pretext of studying the Burmese language. Despite engaging a tutor and taking great pains to appear legitimate, she reported being followed by undercover police. Her book, which has elements of biography, travelogue, and investigative reporting, argues that Orwell did not only write one book about his time in Burma, but that Animal Farm and Nineteen Eighty-Four were based on his experiences as a police officer in colonial Burma. In addition, these two dystopian novels uniquely prophecised what life under the Burmese military dictatorship would be like: from the naming of government departments, to the idea that the government can control the past when the sharing and recording of individual recollections is forbidden. Despite overall positive reviews of the book, one author criticised it as "a nostalgic search for a lost Burma" in which Larkin creates an "ambiguous space... for British colonialism" and "involuntarily makes colonialism more palatable than the sheerly evil current regime".

== Identity ==
Her identity has been the subject of speculation. The fact that the US edition of Finding George Orwell in Burma retained the spelling of the British edition has led to conjecture that Larkin may be British or Anglo-Burmese. Audio recordings of her voice confirm that she speaks with an English accent. Larkin has stated that, despite wishing to publish under her real name, she used a pseudonym primarily to protect the identities of her sources in Myanmar. Because she was obliged to fill in forms using her real name to board buses and trains and stay in hotels, the regime would have been able to piece together where she had been and who she had spoken to. This strategy had been successful as of 2010. She spoke of the paranoia that affects foreign writers in Myanmar due to the constant surveillance and possibility of being searched at any time. This paranoia led her to destroy written notes or pass them to others who are leaving the country. In the aftermath of the 2014 Thai coup d'etat, Larkin spoke of needing to retain her pseudonym due to domestic political concerns. She has however spoken of feeling Thai, and does not identify as an expatriate. Larkin has stated that she has published books using her real name, the titles of which she did not disclose, and that these books were a departure from the non-fiction she had published as of 2014. In 2021, Larkin's photograph was printed alongside a short biography in the back matter of her first novel. As of 2022 Larkin was writing a yet-to-be-published second novel, set in Myanmar.

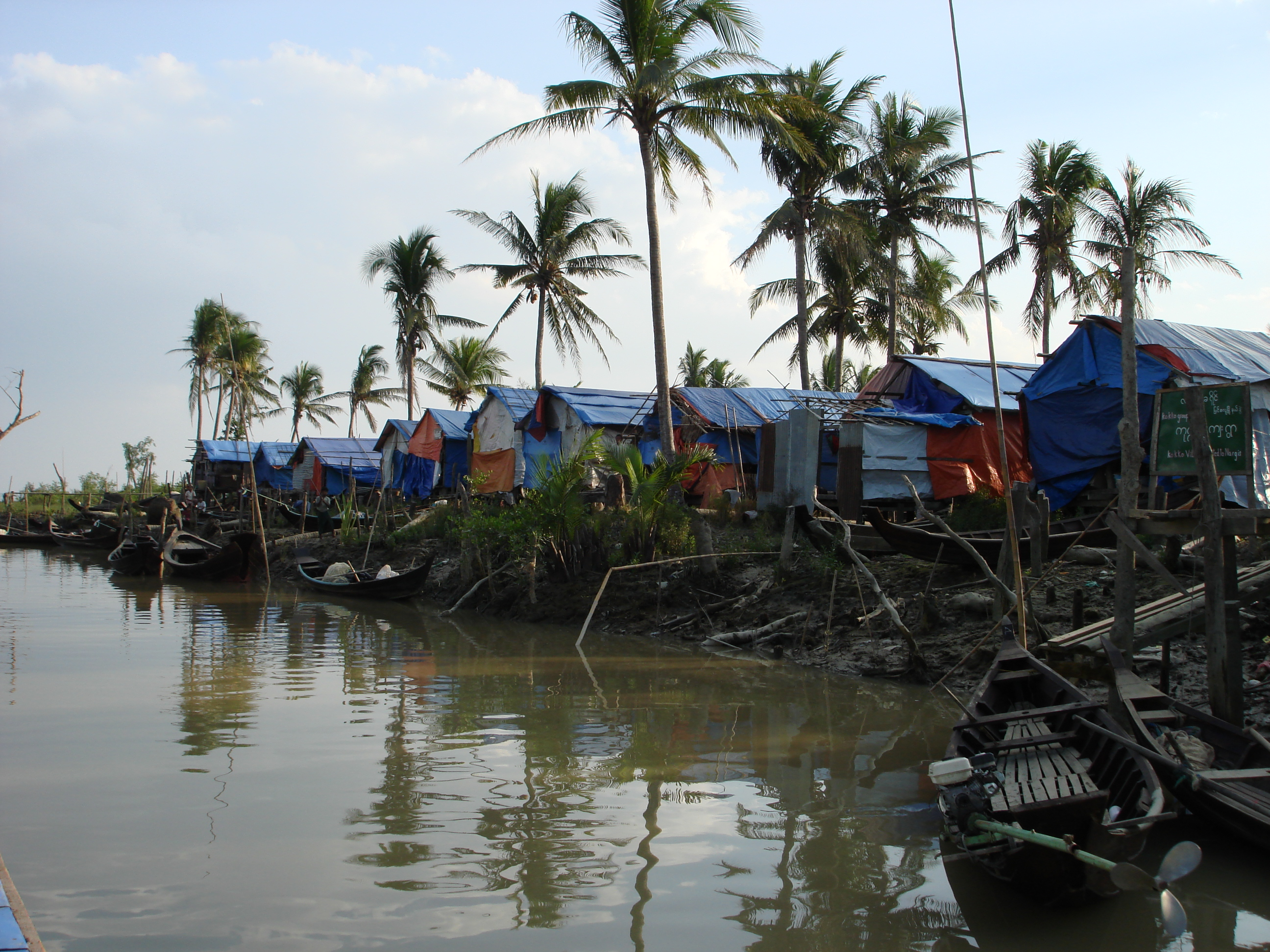
Damage caused by cyclone Nargis in 2008. The military regime's inability to respond to this disaster is documented in her second book.

== Works ==
- Comrade Aeon’s Field Guide to Bangkok, 2021.
- Everything is Broken: The Untold Story of Disaster Under Burma's Military Regime, 2010.
- Refugees from Burma: Their Backgrounds and Refugee Experiences, 2007. (Contributing author for history section).
- Secret Histories: Finding George Orwell in a Burmese Tea Shop, 2005. (Also published as Finding George Orwell in Burma).
- The Self-Conscious Censor: Censorship in Burma under the British, 1900-1939. (Master's thesis, 1999, published in the Journal of Burma Studies, 2003).

Her first book, Finding George Orwell, won the Borders Original Voices Award for Non-Fiction in 2005 and was short-listed for the Index on Censorship's Freedom of Expression Award 2005. In 2006, the book won the Mainichi Shimbun's Asia Pacific Grand Prix Award. This book has been taught at university level and has been the subject of academic analysis.

Larkin's first work of fiction published under her pseudonym, Comrade Aeon's Field Guide to Bangkok, continues exploring themes of authoritarianism and censorship, this time with a diverse array of Bangkok residents with converging story arcs related to the 1992 Black May protests and extrajudicial killings by Thai police and armed forces.
