= Thaw Kaung =

Burmese librarian and historian (1937–2026)

Sithu Dr Thaw Kaung
- သော်ကောင်း
- Born: 17 December 1937; Rangoon, Burma
- Died: 29 July 2026 (aged 88)
- Education: Rangoon University; University of London; University of Western Sydney (D.Litt.)
- Occupations: Historian and librarian
- Spouse: Khin Than (m. 1964)
- Children: Min Thaw Kaung; Thant Thaw Kaung; Myat Thaw Kaung
- Parent(s): Sithu U Kaung; Daw Thane
- Awards: Fukuoka Asian Culture Prize (2005); Pakokku U Ohn Pe lifetime achievement award (2008); Myanma Lifetime Achievement in Literature National Literary Award (2010)

Sithu Thaw Kaung (Burmese: သော်ကောင်း; 17 December 1937 – 29 July 2026) was a Burmese university librarian, historian and leading authority in Asian library studies. He specialized in the preservation and archiving of traditional documents, including palm leaf manuscripts.

== Early life ==
Thaw Kaung was born on 17 December 1937 in Rangoon, as the eldest child of second-generation Sino-Burmese parents, Sithu U Kaung (surnamed Saw or Suu), and Daw Thein (surnamed Teoh or Teo). His parents were of Hokkien descent, with ancestors from Quanzhou, Fujian. Thaw Kaung's father was a Director of Education from 1951 to 1957. In 1947, Thaw Kaung followed his father to England to oversee the Burmese scholars studying there. In 1950, he returned to Rangoon, but could not attend school because he suffered from polymyositis.

== Education ==
Thaw attended Methodist English High School (now Basic Education High School No. 1 Dagon) from 1952 to 1954, passing the Matriculation examinations in the First Division with distinctions in English and Geography. He majored in English and Literature at Rangoon University, graduating with First Class Honours in 1959. He won the U Po Hnit Gold Medal, which was awarded by Rangoon University to the highest-standing student in the B.A. examination for Honours English. He was selected in 1960 as a Burma State Scholar to obtain a Postgraduate Diploma in Librarianship, specializing in Oriental Bibliography, from the University of London's University College London in 1962.

== Professional career ==
Thaw was appointed Deputy University Librarian in 1959 and promoted as the Chief Librarian of the Universities' Central Library in 1969. In 1971, he established the Department of Library Studies at the University, and was a central figure in the establishment of the Myanmar Library Association and the National Commission for the Preservation of Traditional Manuscripts. Between 1971 and 1976, he served as Secretary of the Myanmar Language Commission and the first chairman of the committee which compiled the Burmese-English Dictionary. Thaw Kaung was elected an Honorary Fellow of the Library Association UK in 1984, becoming the first Southeast Asian librarian to be awarded this prestigious honour. In 1999, he was awarded the Harold White Fellowship at the National Library of Australia.

== Personal life and death ==
Thaw Kaung married Khin Than in 1964. They had three sons: Min Thaw Kaung, Thant Thaw Kaung, and Myat Thaw Kaung. He resided in Bahan Township, Yangon. Thaw died on 29 July 2026, at the age of 88.

== Awards ==
Thaw was conferred an Honorary Doctor of Letters by the University of Western Sydney in 1999. In 2005, he won the Fukuoka Asian Culture Prize in the Academic Prize category for his professional contributions. In 2008, he was awarded the Pakokku U Ohn Pe lifetime achievement award for his contributions to Burmese literature. In 2010, he was awarded the Myanmar National Literature Award Lifetime Achievement in Literature by the Burmese government.

Various awards conferred in chronological order are as follows:

(1) B.A. (Honours) First class in English Language and Literature (University of Rangoon, 1959). Winner of U Po Hnit Gold Medal. (2) Postgraduate Diploma in Librarianship (University College London, University of London). Specialization in Oriental Bibliography. (1962) (3) Honorary Fellow of the Library Association (U.K.) (Since 1984). Hon.F.L.A. awarded for achievements in librarianship, including the establishment of the first Library Studies Dept. at the University of Yangon (Rangoon). (4) Associate of the Australian Library and Information Association. (1976) (5) Certificate from Western Australian Institute of Technology, (now Curtin University), Perth, for Training in Library Studies, specializing in methods of teaching library studies. (1976) (6) Doctor of Letters (University of Western Sydney) Honoris Causa (1999) (7) Awarded by Fukuoka Asian Culture Prizes as Academic Prize Laureate in 2005. (8) Awarded “Sithu Award” by Myanmar Government

== Publications ==
- Selected Writings of U Thaw Kaung (2004)
- From the Librarian’s Window: Views of Library and Manuscript Studies and Myanmar Literature (2008)
- The Aspects of Myanmar History and Culture (2010)

Details of U Thaw Kaung's articles and publications are as follows:

- (1) Library Manual (the first handbook in Myanmar) Compiler and chapters on cataloguing. Two versions. Two editions.
- (2) On Reference Books (in Myanmar).
- (3) On Translations (also in Myanmar).
- (4) Several articles on books and librarianship in Myanmar and in English.
- (5) Have published several research papers in Myanmar Historical Research Journal; also Jt. Editor and Jt. Secretary to the Editorial Board. Have read papers at annual Conferencesa and published in Proceedings of Conferences, Universities Historical Research Centre, Yangon.
- (6) Have read and published some papers in Journal of the Siam Society; elected Honorary Corresponding Member of the Siam Society since 1993 to present.
- (7) Have submitted some of my papers for publication to the National University of Singapore.
- (8) Recent articles

(i) “Preservation microfilming of Myanmar manuscripts”
(ii) “Microfilming of the Myanmar newspaper Suriya (the Sun)”
(iii) “Japanese microfilming team in Myanmar, 1973-1974” (all three articles in Southeast Asia Microfilms Newsletter, issue no. 21, 1991. Institute of Southeast Asian Studies, Singapore)
(iv) “Myanmar National Library”, Kekal Abadi, jil 10, bil 2, June 1991, University of Malaya Library Journal, Kuala Lumpur, Malaysia.
(v) “Myanmar Traditional Manuscripts and their Preservation and Conservation”, Myanmar Historical Research Journal, no.1 (Nov. 1995) p. 241-273.
(vi) “Sithu Gamani Thingyan and his Zinme Yazawin, the Myanmar Version of the Chiang Mai Chronicle” in Proceedings of the 6th International
(vii) “On the Myanmar Ramayana and Thai Connections”. Paper read at Chulalongkorn University 1998. Two research papers.
(viii) “On Myanmar Ceramics”. Paper read at International Conference in Singapore, 1998.
(ix) “Post-colonial Society and Culture : reflections in Myanmar novels of the last 50 years”, (jt-author with U Than Htut). Proceedings of the Conference on Post Colonial Society and Culture in South East Asia. Yangon: UHRC, 1999.
(x) “Bibliographies Compiled in Myanmar,” Etudes Birmanes en hommage a Denise Bernot. Paris: EFEO, 1998.
(xi) “The Myanmar Library Association and Endeavours for its Formation”. Paper read at IFLA General Conference, August 1999, Bangkok.
(xii) “Myanmar Biographical Writings in the 20th century”(jt-author with U Than Htut), Proceedings of the Views and Visions Conference. Yangon: UHRC, 2001.
(xiii) “Some Myanmar Historical Fiction and their Historical Context”,(jt-author wU Than Htut).
(xiv) Two research papers on King Bayinnaung (1551-1581)for Conferences with Chulalongkorn University, Bangkok-2001; Yangon-2003.
(xv) “Ethnographical Studies on the Ethnic Groups of Myanmar,” Minpaku Anthropology Newsletter, Osaka, no.14 (June 2002).
(xvi) About 50 articles on Places of Historical Interest in Myanmar, for Myanmar Perspectives monthly Internet magazine (1995 to date). In English language.

=== Bibliographies and Indexes ===
- (1) Index to Periodical Articles in English on Burma, 1948 to 1962.
- (2) Bibliography of the Works of U Pe Maung Tin (Eminent Pali Scholar and former Chairman, Myanmar Historical Commission). Abstract published in Ngwe-tar-yi, a local Myanmar monthly magazine; later published in a monograph, 2001.
- (3) Bibliography of Works on Myanmar Literature. Compiled jointly with U Than Htut and Daw San San May (British Library) Published in Myanmar, Yangon: Sarpay Beikman (the Institute of Literature), 1983.392 items with index.
- (4) Bibliography of Myanmar Art and Archaeology. Compiled jointly with Dr. Elizabeth Moore (SOAS, Univ. of London) and Daw San San Maw (former Librarian, Archaeology Dept., Yangon). 1993. Unpublished. Available on computer.
- (5) Bibliography of Early Printed Books in Myanmar, 1819-1885. Compiled in 1992. Available on computer.
- (6) Index to Papers of Gordon H. Luce. Compiled for the National Library of Australia, 1999. Available on the Internet.
