= Romanization of Burmese =

Representation of Burmese in the Latin script

Romanization of the Burmese alphabet is representation of the Burmese language or Burmese names in the Latin alphabet.

== Official transcription systems ==
The MLC romanization system (1980) is promoted inside Myanmar. Inside and outside Myanmar several other systems may also be used. Replicating Burmese sounds in the Latin script is complicated.

- MLC Transcription System (MLCTS), of the Myanmar Language Commission is the government recommended transliteration system for rendering Burmese in the Latin alphabet. This system is used in many linguistic publications regarding Burmese, and is used in all MLC publications as the primary form of transcription for Burmese. It is loosely based on the widely accepted academic romanization of Pali, and has some similarities to the Library of Congress' ALA-LC Romanization index system for Burmese publications. MLCTS transcribes sounds in formal Burmese and is based on the orthography rather than the phonology.
- BGN/PCGN romanization of Burmese (1970) is the BGN/PCGN romanization adopted by the United States Board on Geographic Names (BGN) and the Permanent Committee on Geographical Names for British Official Use (PCGN).
- ALA-LC romanization for Burmese is used by the Library of Congress for cataloguing Burmese language book holdings.

== Academic and language-teaching transcription systems ==
Academic and language-teaching transcription systems include:

- Mendelson's system: i.e. E. Michael Mendelson (1975)
- Cornyn-Roop system: i.e. William S. Cornyn, D. Haigh Roop Beginning Burmese (1968)
- John Okell A Guide to the Romanization of Burmese (2002) - conventional transcription with accented tones
- Minn Latt The Prague method romanization of Burmese (1958) - this method was created as the author was teaching Burmese in Charles University in Prague. It is based on William S. Cornyn's system (1944).

== Personal names ==
Several colloquial transcription systems have been proposed, but none is overwhelmingly preferred over others. Transcription of Burmese is not standardized, as seen in the varying English transcriptions of Burmese names. For instance, a Burmese personal name like ဝင်း ([wɪ́ɴ]) may be variously romanized as Win, Winn, Wyn, or Wynn, while ခိုင် ([kʰàɪɴ]) may be romanized as Khaing, Khine, or Khain.
