= D. G. E. Hall =

British historian, writer, and academic

Daniel George Edward Hall
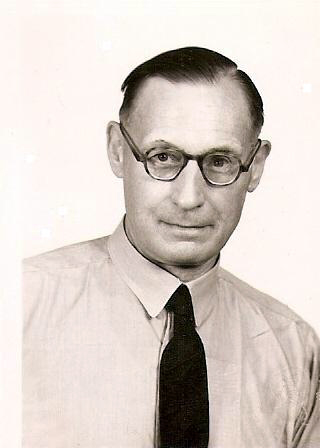
- Portrait of Hall
- Born: 17 November 1891; Hertfordshire, England
- Died: 12 October 1979 (aged 87); Hitchin, UK
- Occupations: Historian, author and academic

Daniel George Edward Hall (1891–1979) was a British historian, writer, and academic. He wrote extensively on the history of Burma. His most notable work is A History of Southeast Asia, said to "...remain the most important single history of the region, providing encyclopedic coverage of material published up to the time of its 1981 revision."

He was a Headmaster of Caterham School and held professorships in Southeast Asian history at both Cornell University and the University of London – where he eventually became professor emeritus.

== Biography ==
=== Early life ===
Daniel George Edward Hall was born on 17 November 1891 into a farming family in Hertfordshire, England. His early education was at Hitchin Grammar School. He entered the Department of History in King's College London in 1913 and graduated in 1916 with a first-class honors degree in Modern History, winning the Gladstone Memorial Prize. Hall also won an Inglis Studentship that allowed him to gain a Master's degree from the University of London with a thesis on mercantile aspects of English foreign policy during the reign of Charles II. During the First World War Hall served in the army with Inns of Court Regiment, and also toured the Western Front with the Lena Ashworth concert party.

=== Career ===
In early 1919, Hall obtained a position as senior history master at Royal Grammar School, Worcester. Later that year Hall married Helen Eugenie Banks (who, two years his junior at King's College, had also been awarded the Gladstone Memorial Prize) and began teaching history at Bedales School, Hampshire.

While at Bedales School, Hall was offered the position of chair of history at the recently founded University of Rangoon. Upon his arrival in Rangoon in May 1921, Hall was faced with a history syllabus was that was unsuited to the new university, being focused on classical Greece, Rome and modern European history. His initial task therefore was to create courses and provide textbooks that were relevant to the needs of his Burmese students. It was while engaged in this task, and developing the local history content of the syllabus, that Hall became interested in Burmese culture and Asian studies. However his full-scale pursuit of these interests had to wait until he had completed the task of developing and teaching the Western history syllabus of the university.

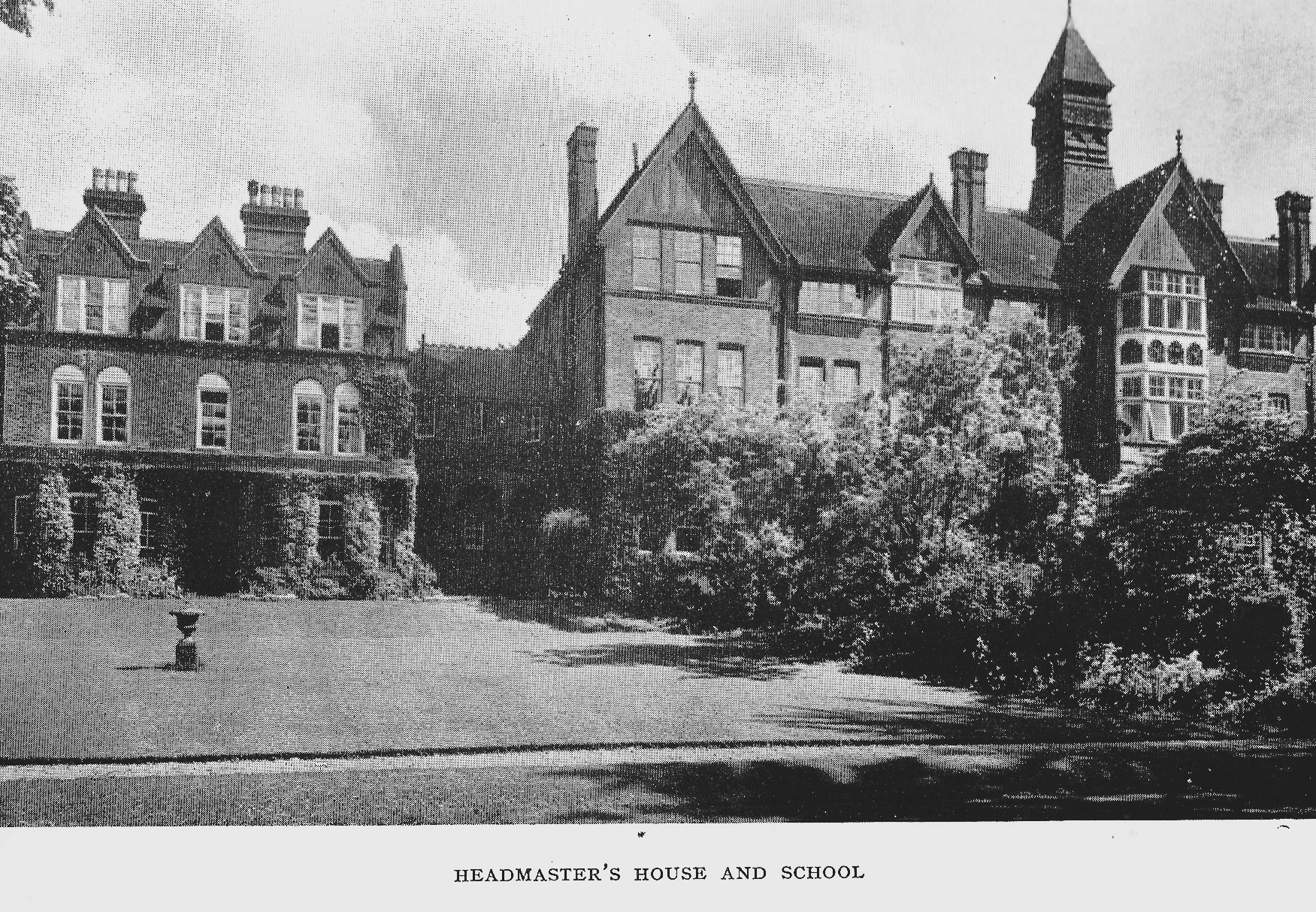
D.G.E. Hall's house and garden at Caterham School, taken c. 1945 when he lived there.

Thus it was not until 1927 that the first results of Hall's research into Anglo-Burmese relations was published with his paper “English Relations with Burma, 1587–1686" published in the Journal of the Burma Research Society, 1927. The completion of further research, including The Dalhousie-Phayre Correspondence, led to Hall being awarded a degree of Doctor of Literature by the University of London. In 1934 Hall was forced to resign his chair in Rangoon and return to England due to his family having developed trachoma, which made it impossible for them to remain in the tropics.

Upon his return to England Hall took up the position of Headmaster of Caterham School in Surrey. Hall left Caterham in 1949 when he was appointed chair of the History of South East Asia department at the University of London School of Oriental and African Studies. It was while at SOAS that Hall published his History of South-East Asia (1955), the center-piece of his work. In September 1959 Hall retired from the University of London and took up a visiting professor position at Cornell University. After retiring from Cornell and returning to England in 1973, Hall published his biography of Henry Burney in 1975.

Hall died on 12 October 1979.

== Books and publications ==
- 1922: A Professorship of Far Eastern History Journal of the Burma Research Society
- 1925: A Brief Survey of English Constitutional History London: Harrap.
- 1927: English Relations with Burma, 1587–1686 Journal of the Burma Research Society
- 1928: Early English Intercourse With Burma, 1587–1743 Rangoon University Publications
- 1935: A High School British History, 1714–1930, for Burma, India and the East Oxford University Press
- 1945: Europe and Burma: A study of European Relations with Burma to the Annexation of Thibaw's Kingdom,1886 London: Oxford University Press
- 1950: Burma London: Hutchinson's University Library
- 1955: A History of Southeast Asia London: Macmillan Limited
- 1955: Michael Symes, Journal of his Second Embassy to the Court of Ava in 1802 London: George Allen and Unwin
- 1963: Historians of South-East Asia Oxford University Press ( editor)
- 1974: Henry Burney: A Political Biography London: Oxford University Press

== Notes ==
AIM25 Project Identity Statement (Reference code: GB 0102 PP MS 18)
