= Ye Yint Thet Zwe =

Burmese poet (born 1965)

- ရဲရင့်သက်ဇွဲ
- Born: 1965 (age 60–61); Rangoon, Burma
- Occupations: Poet and Journalist
- Writing career
- Period: 1988 - present
- Notable work: We hate war, mother!

Ye Yint Thet Zwe (Burmese: ရဲရင့်သက်ဇွဲ, MLCTS: yeyintthetzwe) (born 1965) is a Burmese poet currently based in Helsinki.

== Biography ==
Ye Yint studied Myanmar Literature at Yangon until 1988, when the student revolution (commonly known as the 8888 Uprising) began and Ye Yint joined the student army. In 1990, he left Burma (also known as Myanmar) for political reasons and has lived in Thailand, Malaysia, Singapore, Japan and Finland, his current home.

In Tokyo, Ye Yint founded the independent Burmese library Ahara with the help of other writers as a way to preserve their heritage. He was also editor of Ahara magazine, second chairman of the Burmese Workers Union in Japan, part of the Burma Media Association, and a supporter member of the student army of the Myanmar and Thailand border (ABSDF).

Ye Yint has also been an editor, journalist and photographer for the Burma Today News Media based in New York City, and poetry collaborator for MMM Media, Yoma 3 News Media, Dawn O Way Magazine and Moe Makha Online Media Magazine. Works by Ye Yint have been included in poetry compilations such as 5 flowers, 8888 commemoration, Saffron revolution and The Sorrows of European Nights Suffering.

Ye Yint has been very active in the literary community, participating in many experimental literary events and slam poetry festivals in Finland. In 2015, he was invited to the Runokuu (Poetry Moon) international poetry festival in Helsinki, reading his work in collaboration with the electronic musicians Romulus Chiciuk and Alejandro Montes de Oca.

Ye Yint Thet Zwe's poetry was the subject of the film The Journey of a Broken Bird directed by Mexican engineer and photographer Jaime Culebro. The film, released in 2016, tells the story of Julia and Ye Yint's journey over the streets of Helsinki.

== Bibliography ==
=== Poetry ===
- We Hate War, Mother (2016, Helsinki) (Karu Kartonera, Sivuvalo Project).
