= Frasch =

Frasch may refer to:

- Frasch, the North Frisian language
- Herman Frasch (1851–1914), German mining engineer and inventor
  - Frasch process, a method of extracting sulfur from underground deposits, devised by Herman Frasch
- Tilman Frasch (active from 1994), German historian
