= Journal of the Burma Research Society =

- Discipline: Burma studies
- Language: English

Publication details
- History: 1911–1980
- Publisher: Burma Research Society (Burma)
- Frequency: Biannual

Standard abbreviations
- ISO 4: J. Burma Res. Soc.

Indexing
- ISSN: 0304-2227
- LCCN: 23013972
- OCLC no.: 1537852

The Journal of the Burma Research Society (Burmese: မြန်မာနိုင်ငံသုတေသနအသင်းဂျာနယ်, JBRS) was an academic journal covering Burma studies that was published by the Burma Research Society between 1911 and 1980. When it began publication in 1911, the journal became the first peer-reviewed academic journal focused on Burma studies. Over the 69-year period, the journal published 59 volumes and 132 issues, including over 1,300 articles. It was published twice a year at the Rangoon University Estate in both English and Burmese.

Until its closure in 1980, the journal was the country's principal scholarly publication. By the mid-1910s, it was also the leading platform in the field of scholarly reviews of Burmese fiction. The journal analyzed a wide range of Burmese culture and Burmese history topics and published ethnographic studies, translations and reviews of Burmese literature, folklore, music and theology, fauna, geography and archaeology reports, historical essays, and annotated texts and essays of historical significance, translated from Burmese, Pali, Mon, and other languages.

The journal came under government regulation after 1962. In 1980, it was closed, alongside its publishing body, the Burma Research Society, by the Burma Socialist Programme Party government.

The journal remains a major source in Burma studies publications to date. (Note: For example, see (Harvey 1925: 381) and (Htin Aung 1967: 345–350) for an index of citations throughout the books. See more recent works (Liberman 2003) and Aung-Thwin (2005) where several JBRS articles are cited throughout the books.)

== Legacy ==
In 2011, Burmese and Western scholars convened at Yale University with the goal of re-establishing the JBRS for scholars. Its successor, named the Independent Journal of Burmese Scholarship (IJBS), published its first issue in August 2016.

== Bibliography ==
- Aung-Thwin, Michael (2005). The mists of Rāmañña: The Legend that was Lower Burma (illustrated ed.). Honolulu: University of Hawai'i Press. ISBN 9780824828868.
- Lieberman, Victor B. (2003). Strange Parallels: Southeast Asia in Global Context, c. 800–1830, volume 1, Integration on the Mainland. Cambridge University Press. ISBN 978-0-521-80496-7.
- Harvey, G. E. (1925). History of Burma: From the Earliest Times to 10 March 1824. London: Frank Cass & Co. Ltd.
- Htin Aung, Maung (1967). A History of Burma. New York and London: Cambridge University Press.
