= Thant Thaw Kaung =

Burmese librarian and publisher

- သန့်သော်ကောင်း
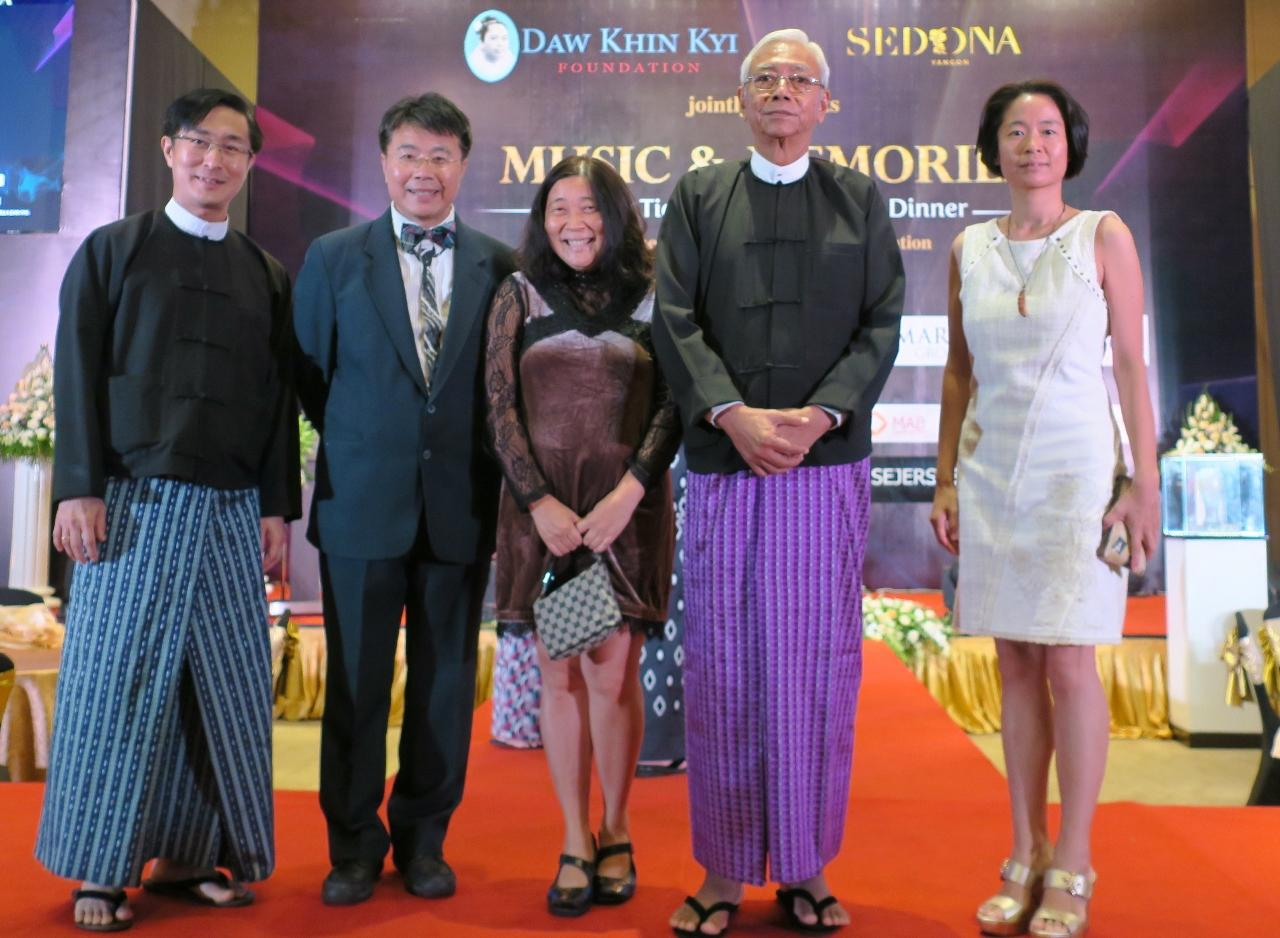
- Thant Thaw Kaung (on the furthest left) with Htin Kyaw (in the centre)
- Born: 1969 (age 56–57); Burma
- Education: University of Medicine 1, Yangon
- Occupations: Library advocate; publisher
- Employer(s): Myanmar Book Centre; Myanmar Book Aid and Preservation Foundation
- Parent(s): Thaw Kaung; Khin Than
- Awards: Jeri Laber International Freedom to Publish Award (2016)

Thant Thaw Kaung (Burmese: သန့်သော်ကောင်း) is a Burmese publisher and library advocate. He heads the Myanmar Book Aid and Preservation Foundation, and the Daw Khin Kyi Foundation's mobile library project.

== Early life and education ==
Thaw Kaung was born in 1969 to Thaw Kaung, a Burmese academic, and Khin Than, a government accountant. He graduated from the University of Medicine 1, Yangon.

== Career ==
After graduating, Thant Thaw Kaung practiced as a physician until founding the Myanmar Book Centre, a book importer and distributor in 1995. Myanmar Book Centre supplies books and educational materials to 98% of the country's libraries, schools, and universities.

After the 2008 Cyclone Nargis, Thant Thaw Kaung succeeded his father to become head of the Myanmar Book Aid and Preservation Foundation, which seeks to preserve Burmese manuscripts and books.

In 2013, he joined the advisory board of the Asian Festival of Children's Content, replacing his father. In 2014, the Asia Foundation awarded Thant Thaw Kaung with a visiting fellowship. In 2014, the Association of American Publishers awarded him the Jeri Laber International Freedom to Publish Award for playing "a leading role in keeping books and literary life alive in Myanmar (Burma) under an oppressive authoritarian regime." In 2017, APNIC's Information Society Innovation Fund funded Thant Thaw Kaung's foundation through a grant.

Thant Thaw Kaung also managed the mobile library initiative of the Daw Khin Kyi Foundation, a charitable foundation set up by Aung San Suu Kyi. In the aftermath of the 2021 Myanmar coup d'état, the military junta launched an investigation into the finances of the foundation, which was founded by Suu Kyi in 2012. Thant Thaw Kaung was detained in February 2021. In January 2022, he was called to testify in criminal proceedings against Suu Kyi, but did not appear in court, which forced the trial to be delayed.
