= Maung Weik =

Burmese businessman (born 1973)

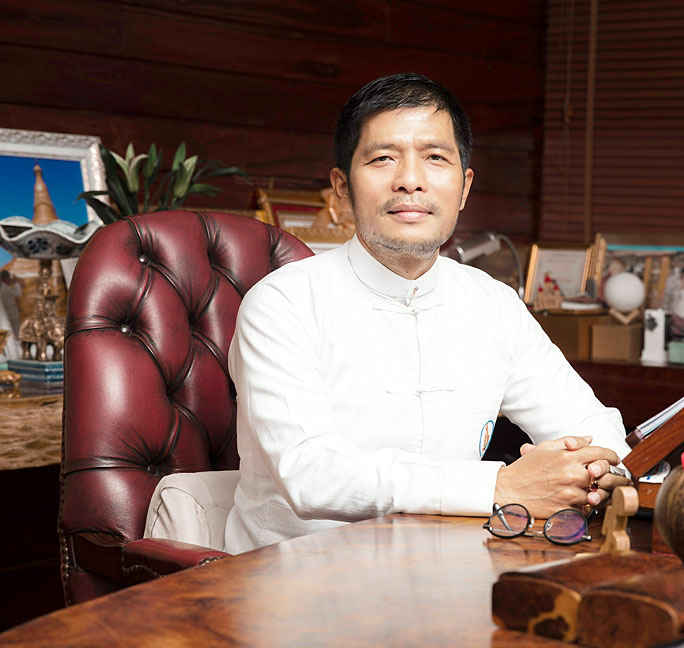
- Born: 11 January 1973 (age 53)
- Education: Yangon University
- Occupation: Businessman
- Known for: Founder of Maung Weik & Family Company

Maung Weik (Burmese: မောင်ဝိတ်; born 11 January 1973, also spelt Maung Wate) is a Burmese tycoon. He is currently chairman of the Mandalay Business Capital City Development (MBCCD) and the Sae Paing Company.

== Early life and education ==
Weik was born in 1973 in Pathein. He passed the matriculation exam at a high school in Dagon. In 1995, he graduated from Yangon University, specializing in geology.

== Sports ==
He represented Myanmar as a golf player at the 1991 Southeast Asian Games, held in the Philippines. In 1992, he was at the Southeast Asian Amateur Golf Team Championship (Putra Cup), which was held in Brunei.

== Business interests ==
Weik founded the Maung Weik and Family Company, which worked in development, real estate, trading, and construction sectors.

In 2017, the Mandalay City Development Committee approved a public-private partnership with MBCCD for a 10-year mega-development project in Amarapura, projected to include hotels, hospitals, schools, jetties, shopping centers, gardens, and apartment buildings on a plot of 2,000 acres (810 ha) allocated by the Mandalay city government.

== Controversies ==
Weik was a close associate of Khin Nyunt, a former prime minister and military general. He reportedly catered to wealthy young people, notably the sons of the generals. According to the semi-official Myanmar Times, he has engaged in drug trafficking from Malaysia to Burma since 2003.

On 10 July 2008, he was charged with drug abuse and trafficking by the Lanmadaw Township police station, accused of importing ecstasy, methamphetamines, and ketamine, and trafficking them to the children of Burmese military generals and actors. In November 2008, he was sentenced to 15 years in prison on drug trafficking charges by the Lanmadaw Township Court. He reportedly used drugs with Aung Ye Zaw Myint, the son of Ye Myint, a former chief of the Bureau of Special Operations. Maung Weik was released from Pathein Prison on 3 January 2014.

Maung Weik explained that the 2008 conviction by authorities of drug trafficking was "murder without death" at a press conference at the Novotel Hotel in 2016. Moreover, Maung Weik said in front of the media at a press conference that he never used or distributed drugs.

In 2016, Maung Weik courted controversy over bribery allegations that Yangon mayor Phyo Min Thein accepted a US$100,000 (equivalent to $134,000 in 2025) Patek Philippe watch as a gift from Maung Weik.

While he kept doing his business and duties very well, in 2016, local media published the news regarding the controversy over bribery allegations that he bribed U Phyo Min Thein, who used to be Chief Minister of Yangon Region, who accepted a Patek Philippe watch as a gift from him. As a response to the libelous material, Maung Weik created a press conference and declared that he was ready for judgment anytime at any court.

Later, he fully supported the National League for Democracy government and became well known for being a close fan of the NLD government.

== 2021 Myanmar coup d'état ==
On 1 February 2021, in the aftermath of the 2021 Myanmar coup d'état, Maung Weik was detained by the military junta. After detaining him for over a month, on 17 March 2021, Myanmar Radio and Television released a video file showing that Maung Weik had donated $550,000 to the Daw Khin Kyi Foundation illegally. However, BBC reported that it was a pre-recorded video of low quality with unclear sound. He accused Aung San Suu Kyi of accepting USD $500,000 in bribes and also accused Mandalay Region Chief Minister Zaw Myint Maung of accepting bribes of $100,000 for his medical costs in Bangkok.

On 18 February 2022, Maung Weik testified during the court hearing of Zaw Myint Maung that he made cash donations of 65,000,000 Kyats for Zaw Myint Maung’s medical expenses.

On 23 February 2022, during the court hearing of Dr. Myo Aung, who was accused of the acceptance of cash donations for candidates to participate in the election, Maung Weik testified that he made a cash donation of K11,000,000.

According to media reports, Maung Weik announced a voluntary donation to the Daw Khin Kyi Foundation according to his wishes in the Naypyitaw Special Court on May 31, 2022, in connection with a USD $550,000 donation for the Daw Khin Kyi Foundation, which has filed a corruption lawsuit against Aung San Suu Kyi by SAC.

Many media reported that "he repeatedly said in the court that the case for cash donations was not for bribery, and only to show sympathy as he lost his father and grandfather due to cancer disease".

On June 29, 2023, Maung Weik was released from the military council after attending a ceremony regarding the Māravijaya Buddha statue in NayPyiTaw, which was attended by more than 100 leading Burmese tycoons. After being detained for more than 2 years and 4 months, he was released by the military council and returned home.

== Philanthropy ==
In 1999, he donated over 5,000 lakh kyats to the Shwedagon Pagoda.

Maung Weik has donated a large amount of humanitarian aid. Providing humanitarian assistance to the people of Rakhine State, he donated 15,000 lakh kyats to the Resettlement Development Project (UEHRD) in 2017.

On 19 February 2019, Maung Weik made the donation ceremony at the Pahtodawgyi for depositing the shrines and setting up the central pole together with the local people honorably. Additionally, he also donated the umbrella which was also the 7th time crown of Amarapura Pahtodawgyi.

During the first and second waves of COVID-19, free quarantine centers and treatment centers were opened in Rangoon and Mandalay, and Maung Weik's company donated oxygen concentrators and various medicines until 2022.

== Personal life ==
He was previously married to Yin Min Thee.

Since some media published libelous media, Yin Min Thi, his ex-spouse, was the niece of former Vice President Myint Swe, Yin Min Thi had to come out herself in order to solve the issue.

== Awards and titles ==
In 2020, President Win Myint awarded the 8 numbers of local business men including Maung Weik with the title Agga Maha Sirisudhamma Manijotadhara.
