= F. K. Lehman =

American anthropologist (1924–2016)

- Born: Frederic Kris Lehman; February 5, 1924; New York City
- Died: February 10, 2016 (aged 92); Urbana, Illinois
- Occupation: Anthropologist
- Spouse: Sheila Lehman

Academic background
- Education: Columbia University

Academic work
- Institutions: University of Illinois at Urbana–Champaign
- Main interests: Burma studies
- Notable works: The Structure of Chin Society (1963)

F. K. Lehman (February 5, 1924 – February 10, 2016; born Frederic Kris Lehman; also known by his Burmese name U Chit Hlaing, or sometimes as F. K. L. Chit Hlaing) was an American anthropologist and professor emeritus at University of Illinois at Urbana–Champaign. Widely known as one of the founding fathers of Burma studies in the United States, he taught at the University of Illinois at Urbana–Champaign from 1952 until his retirement in 2009.

== Early life ==
Frederic Kris Lehman was born in 1924 in New York City. Born into a family of gem merchants, he spent his childhood in Calcutta, India and Lashio, Burma. In 1941, he returned to New York City.

== Education ==
Lehman obtained a BA in mathematics (1949) from New York University and a PhD (1959) in Anthropology and Linguistics from Columbia University.

== Career ==
Lehman taught at the University of Illinois at Urbana–Champaign from 1952 until his retirement in 2009 at the age of 85. He supervised dozens of graduate students at the University of Illinois. He conducted ethnographic research among many ethnic groups of Burma, including the Chin, Mizo (Lushai), Shan, Karen, Kayah, Burmese, Thai, and Yunnanese.

Lehman also played an instrumental role in the founding of the Center for Burma Studies at Northern Illinois University.

== Personal life ==
F. K. Lehman married Sheila Geyer in New York City on September 10, 1956. They had two sons.

== Death ==
Lehman died on February 10, 2016, at the age of 92.

== Publications ==
Lehman published more than 60 articles. He also published two monographs, which are:

- 1963. The Structure of Chin Society. Urbana: University of Illinois Press. (2nd ed. 1981. Calcutta: Firma KLM for Tribal Research Centre.)
- 1967. “Kayah Society as a Function of the Shan-Burma-Karen Context.” In Contemporary Change in Traditional Societies, vol. 1, ed. J. H. Steward, 1–104. Urbana: University of Illinois Press.

== See also ==
- Burma studies
- Gordon Luce
