= Daw Khin Kyi Foundation =

Burmese charitable foundation

- ဒေါ်ခင်ကြည်ဖောင်ဒေးရှင်း
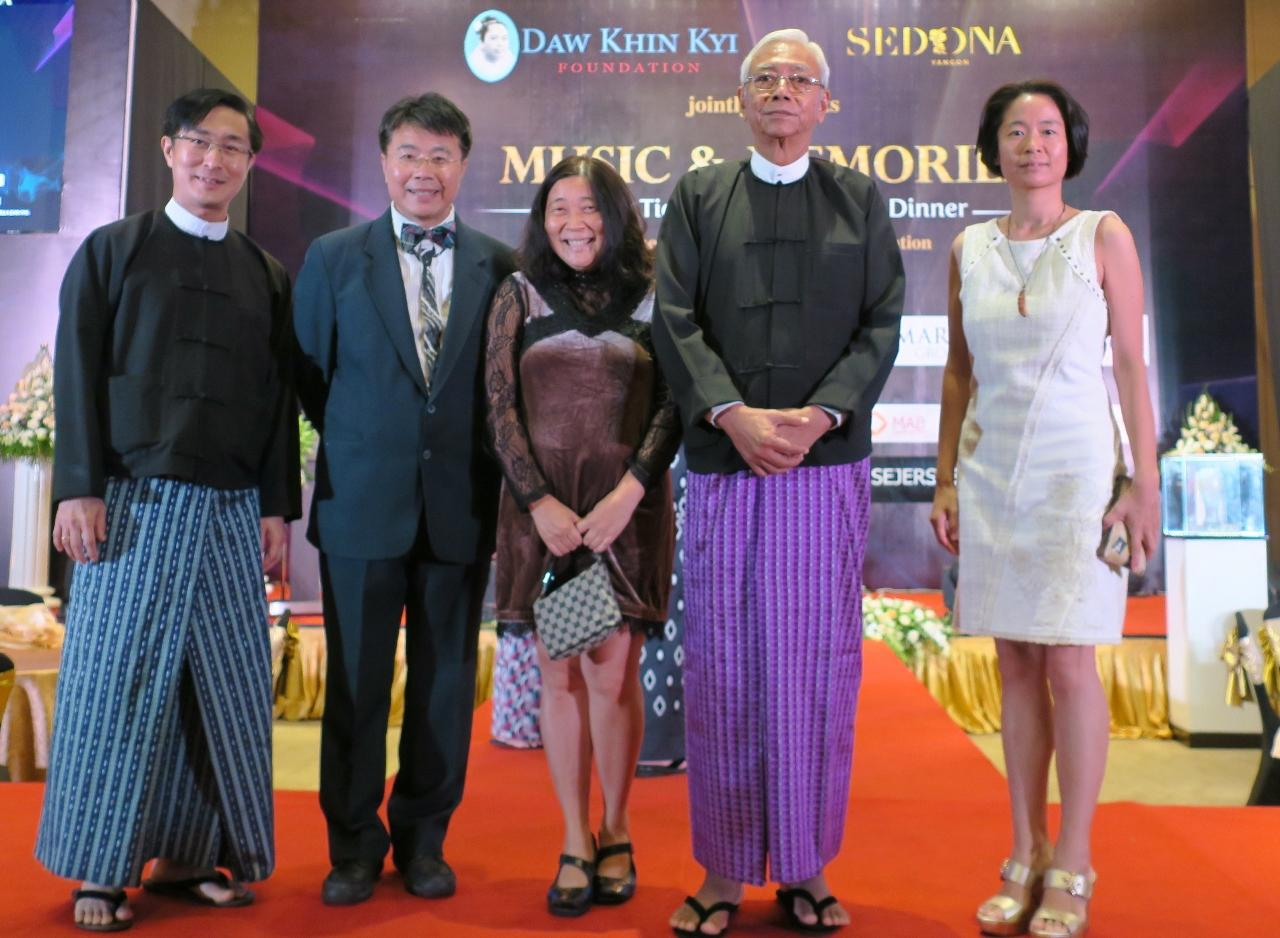
- A banquet of the foundation in 2018
- Abbreviation: DKKF
- Named after: Khin Kyi
- Formation: 2012; 14 years ago
- Founder: Aung San Suu Kyi
- Legal status: Foundation
- Headquarters: Kaba Aye Pagoda Road, Yangon, Myanmar
- Website: dawkhinkyifoundation.org

Daw Khin Kyi Foundation (Burmese: ဒေါ်ခင်ကြည်ဖောင်ဒေးရှင်း, abbreviated DKKF) is a major Burmese charitable foundation. It was set up by Aung San Suu Kyi in 2012, and is named for her mother, Khin Kyi. It works to improve the education, health and welfare of the people of Myanmar. Htin Kyaw worked as a senior executive for the foundation before his election as President of Myanmar in March 2016.

== Activities ==
The foundation runs a Hospitality and Catering Training Academy in Kawhmu Township, in Yangon Region. Aung San Suu Kyi's friend Nasuo Miyashito donated 2 Hino cars. In 2013, the mobile library service started with that cars. The leader of the project is Dr. Thant Thaw Kaung, a member of the Foundation's executive committee. It gradually expanded to 17 vehicles, 346 sets of computers and accessories, and more than 110,000 books.

On 23 August 2019, Daw Khin Kyi Foundation has been providing assistance for the flood-affected people from 450 houses in 5 villages of Dawphyar Village-tract of Kawkareik Township in Kayin State.

In September 2019, Daw Khin Kyi foundation and the Information and Public Relations Department under Myanmar's Ministry of Information, signed a Memorandum of Understanding (MoU) on cooperation for community centers and libraries.

In January 2020, the foundation built 50 houses for Chin internally displaced persons (IDPs) in Thantlang Township, Chin State.

In June 2020, Daw Khin Kyi Foundation was criticised for the land grant of over 23 acres by some MPs and members of the public.

On 15 January 2021, the foundation donated more than 530 million kyats to the government for buying COVID-19 vaccinations.

== 2021 Myanmar coup d'état ==
On 10 February 2021, in the aftermath of the 2021 Myanmar coup d'état, the military-led Bureau of Special Investigation (BSI) raided the foundation's Yangon office without a search warrant. BSI officials seized computers, financial records, and bank statements during the raid. Moe Zaw Oo, a member of the Peace Commission set up by Suu Kyi's government, and Thant Thaw Kaung, a publisher known for advocating for libraries, were detained. Aung San Suu Kyi was charged under Section 55 of the Anti-Corruption Law, claiming that 1.86 acres of land and building in University Avenue Road was rented at a lower rate by abusing her position to open the headquarters of Daw Khin Kyi Foundation.

On 17 March 2021, Myanmar Radio and Television released a video file showing that Maung Weik, who is the chairman of Sae Paing Co., Ltd., had given the Daw Khin Kyi Foundation $550,000 illegally. According to media reports, Maung Weik announced a voluntary donation to the Daw Khin Kyi Foundation according to his wishes in the Naypyitaw Special Court on May 31, 2022, in connection with a USD 550,000 donation for the Daw Khin Kyi Foundation, which has filed a corruption lawsuit against Aung San Suu Kyi by SAC. Many media reported that "he repeatedly said in the court that the case for cash donations was not for bribery, and only to show sympathy as he lost his father and grandfather due to cancer disease".
