= Journal of Burma Studies =

- Discipline: Burma studies
- Language: English
- Edited by: Catherine Raymond

Publication details
- History: 1996–present
- Publisher: University of Hawaiʻi Press on behalf of the Center for Burma Studies (United States)
- Frequency: Semiannual

Standard abbreviations
- ISO 4: J. Burma Stud.

Indexing
- ISSN: 1094-799X (print); 2010-314X (web)
- LCCN: 98660138
- OCLC no.: 608164973

Links
- Journal homepage; Online access at Project MUSE; Journal page at Center for Burma Studies

The Journal of Burma Studies is a semiannual peer-reviewed academic journal covering Burma studies. It is published by the University of Hawaiʻi Press on behalf of the on behalf of the Center for Burma Studies (Northern Illinois University). It was established in 1996, it is one of only a few journals that focus exclusively on Myanmar (Burma), such as the SOAS Bulletin of Burma Research and Burma Economic Watch. The journal is sponsored by the Burma Studies Group.

== Abstracting and indexing ==
The journal is abstracted and indexed in Scopus, International Bibliography of the Social Sciences, Linguistic Bibliography, and the Modern Language Association Database.
