= Michael W. Charney =

Military historian of Asia

- Born: 27 December 1967 (age 58)
- Known for: Editor-in-Chief of the SOAS Bulletin of Burma Research

Academic background
- Education: University of Michigan
- Thesis: Where Jambudipa and Islamdom Converged: Religious Change and the Emergence of Buddhist Communalism in Early Modern Arakan, 15th-19th Centuries (1999)

Academic work
- Institutions: SOAS University of London

Michael W. Charney (born 27 December 1967) is a military historian of Asia, a Myanmar specialist, and a Professor of Asian and Military History at SOAS University of London, where he teaches international security, strategic studies, and Asian military history. He is one of contributing authors of Oxford Research Encyclopedia of Asian History.

== Academic career ==
His has M.A. degrees in Asian Studies at the University of Michigan and Asian History at Ohio University. After receiving his PhD in History at the University of Michigan in 1999, Charney joined the Centre for Advanced Studies at the National University of Singapore (1999-2001) as a postdoctoral research fellow for two years working on migration studies and religion studies.

In 2001, he began teaching in the history department at SOAS. From 2003 to 2010, he was the Editor-in-Chief of the SOAS Bulletin of Burma Research. In 2019, he moved to the Centre for International Studies and Diplomacy, also at SOAS.

== Works ==
=== Monographs ===
- Imperial Military Transportation in British Asia: Burma 1941-1942 (Bloomsbury, 2019)
- A History of Modern Burma (Cambridge University Press, 2009)
- Powerful Learning: Buddhist Literati and the Throne in Burma's Last Dynasty, 1752-1885 (The University of Michigan Centers for South and Southeast Asian Studies, 2006)
- Southeast Asian Warfare 1300-1900 (Brill, 2004)

=== Edited books ===
- History of Warfare (Routledge, 2022)
- Warring Societies of Pre-colonial Southeast Asia: Local Cultures of Conflict Within a Regional Context (NIAS, 2017)
- The Encyclopedia of Empire (Wiley-Blackwell, 2015)
- Warfare in Early Modern South East Asia: Special Issue of South East Asia Research (Taylor & Francis, 2004)
- Asian Migrants and Education: The Tensions of Education in Immigrant Societies and Among Migrant Groups (Dordrecht: Kluwer Academic Publishers, 2003)
- Approaching Transnationalism: Studies on Transnational Societies, Multicultural Contacts and Imaginings of Home (Dordrecht: Kluwer Academic Publishers, 2003)
- Chinese Migrants Abroad: Cultural, Educational and Social Dimensions of the Chinese Diaspora (Singapore University Press, 2003)
