= John Okell =

British linguist (1934–2020)

John Okell OBE
- Born: 1934; Brighton, England
- Died: 3 August 2020 (aged 86)

Academic background
- Education: University of Oxford (B.A., M.A.)

Academic work
- Discipline: Linguist
- Institutions: SOAS (1959–1999)
- Main interests: Burma studies

John William Alan Okell OBE (/oʊˈkɛl/; 1934 – 3 August 2020) was a British linguist notable for his expertise in the field of Burma studies.

== Life ==
Okell was born in Brighton and was educated at The Queen's College, University of Oxford, where he read Literae Humaniores ("Greats").

In 1959, an inquiry about language courses through the British Foreign Office led to his joining the School of Oriental and African Studies as a trainee lecturer in Burmese: "They were looking for someone to be taught Burmese. I applied to the program as I was interested in languages and they chose me and trained me."

At SOAS, he studied Burmese with Hla Pe and Anna J. Allott, phonetics with R. K. Sprigg and N. C. Scott, and general linguistics with R. H. Robins and Eugénie Henderson. After eighteen months of study, he travelled to Burma, where he spent a year (1960–1961) immersing himself in the country's language and culture. He returned for another year-long visit in 1969.

He retired from SOAS in 1999, although he remained a research associate in the Department of South East Asia. Following his retirement, he continued his teaching of Burmese through short courses convened in a variety of places, most notably Chiang Mai and Yangon.

In 2014, in the Queen's Birthday Honours, he was made an Officer of the Order of the British Empire for services to UK/Burma relations.

In 2016, SOAS awarded him an honorary doctorate.

He was the creator of the Avalaser Burmese computer font and the Chairman of the Britain-Burma Society.

He died on 3 August 2020 at the age of eighty-six.

== Notable works ==
=== Books ===
- Okell, John (1969). A Reference Grammar of Colloquial Burmese. London: Oxford University Press.
- Okell, John (1971). A Guide to the Romanization of Burmese. London: Luzac.
- Okell, John (1989). First Steps in Burmese. London: School of Oriental and African Studies, University of London.
- Okell, John (1994). Burmese: An Introduction to the Spoken Language: Book 1. De Kalb: Center for Southeast Asian Studies, Northern Illinois University.
- Okell, John (1994). Burmese: An Introduction to the Spoken Language: Book 2. De Kalb: Center for Southeast Asian Studies, Northern Illinois University.
- Okell, John (1994). Burmese: An Introduction to the Script. De Kalb: Center for Southeast Asian Studies, Northern Illinois University.
- Okell, John (1994). Burmese: An Introduction to the Literary Style. De Kalb: Center for Southeast Asian Studies, Northern Illinois University.
- Okell, John, and Anna Allott (2001). Burmese/Myanmar Dictionary of Grammatical Forms. Richmond: Curzon Press.
- Okell, John (2002). Burmese By Ear/Essential Myanmar. London: Audio-Forum, Sussex Publications. (Note: The publishers of Burmese By Ear/Essential Myanmar relinquished publication rights in 2006. Since 2009, it has been available for downloading free of charge from the website of the School of Oriental and African Studies.)

=== Papers ===
- Hla Pe, Anna J. Allott, and John Okell (1963). Three 'Immortal' Burmese Songs. Bulletin of the School of Oriental and African Studies, Vol. 26, No. 3, pp. 559–571.
- Okell, John (1964). Learning Music from a Burmese Master. Man, Vol. 64, p. 183.
- Okell, John (1965). Nissaya Burmese: A Case of Systematic Adaptation to a Foreign Grammar and Syntax. Lingua, Vol. 15, pp. 186–227.
- Okell, John (1967). "Translation" and "Embellishment" in an Early Burmese "Jātaka" Poem. The Journal of the Royal Asiatic Society of Great Britain and Ireland, Nos. 3&4, pp. 133–148.
- Okell, John (1971). The Burmese Double-Reed "Nhai". Asian Music, Vol. 2, No. 1, pp. 25–31.
- Okell, John (1979). "Still" and "Anymore" in Burmese: Another Look at /theì/, /oùn/ and /tó/. Linguistics of the Tibeto-Burman Area, Vol. 4, No. 2, pp. 69–82.
- Okell, John (1988). Notes on Tone Alternation in Maru Verbs. In David Bradley, Eugénie J. A. Henderson, and Martine Mazaudon (eds.), Prosodic Analysis and Asian Linguistics: To Honour R. K. Sprigg, pp. 109–114. Canberra: Pacific Linguistics.
- Okell, John (1989). The Yaw Dialect of Burmese. In J. H. C. S. Davidson (ed.), South-East Asian Linguistics: Essays in Honour of Eugénie J. A. Henderson, pp. 199–217. London: School of Oriental and African Studies, University of London.
- Okell, John (1995). Three Burmese Dialects. In David Bradley (ed.), Papers in Southeast Asian Linguistics No. 13: Studies in Burmese Languages, pp. 1–138. Canberra: Pacific Linguistics.
- Okell, John (2007). Obituary: Dr. U Hla Pe (1913–2007). Bulletin of Burma Research, Vol. 5, Nos. 1&2, pp. 1–4.
