= David MacDonald (trade agent) =

David MacDonald (born Darjeeling) was an author and Tibetologist. He was the British Trade Agent in Tibet for twenty years.

== Publications ==
- The Land of The Lama (1929)
- Touring in Sikkim and Tibet (1930)
- Twenty Years In Tibet (1932)
