= MLC Transcription System =

Official transcription system of Burmese language

The Myanmar Language Commission Transcription System (1980), also known as the MLC Transcription System (MLCTS), is a transliteration system for rendering Burmese in the Latin alphabet. It is loosely based on the common system for romanization of Pali, has some similarities to the ALA-LC romanization and was devised by the Myanmar Language Commission. The system is used in many linguistic publications regarding Burmese and is used in MLC publications as the primary form of romanization of Burmese.

The transcription system is based on the orthography of formal Burmese and is not suited for colloquial Burmese, which has substantial differences in phonology from formal Burmese. Differences are mentioned throughout the article.

== Features ==
- Coalesced letters transcribe stacked consonants.
- Consonantal transcriptions (for initials) are similar to those of Pali.
- Finals are transcribed as consonants (-k, -c, -t, -p) rather than glottal stops
- Nasalized finals are transcribed as consonants (-m, -ny, -n, -ng) rather than as a single -n final.
- The anunasika (ံ) and -m final (မ်) are not differentiated.
- The colon (:) and the period (.) transcribe two tones: heavy and creaky respectively.
- Special transcriptions are used for abbreviated syllables used in literary Burmese.

== Transcription system ==
=== Initials and finals ===
The following initials are listed in the traditional ordering of the Burmese script, with the transcriptions of the initials listed before their IPA equivalents:

က k ([k])	ခ hk ([kʰ])	ဂ g ([ɡ])	ဃ gh ([ɡ])	င ng ([ŋ])
စ c ([s])	ဆ hc ([sʰ])	ဇ j ([z])	ဈ jh ([z])	ည ny ([ɲ])
ဋ t ([t])	ဌ ht ([tʰ])	ဍ d ([d])	ဎ dh ([d])	ဏ n ([n])
တ t ([t])	ထ ht ([tʰ])	ဒ d ([d])	ဓ dh ([d])	န n ([n])
ပ p ([p])	ဖ hp ([pʰ])	ဗ b ([b])	ဘ bh ([b])	မ m ([m])
ယ y ([j])	ရ r ([j] or [r])	လ l^{1} ([l])	ဝ w ([w])	သ s ([θ] or [ɾ̪])
	ဟ h ([h])	ဠ l ([l])	အ a ([ə] or [a])	

^{1}Sometimes used as a final, but preceding diacritics determine its pronunciation.

The Burmese alphabet is arranged in groups of five, and within each group, consonants can stack one another. The consonant above the stacked consonant is the final of the previous vowel. Most words of Sino-Tibetan origin are spelt without stacking, but polysyllabic words of Indo-European origin (such as Pali, Sanskrit, and English) are often spelt with stacking. Possible combinations are as follows:

Group	Burmese	Transcriptions	Example
ka.	က္က, က္ခ, ဂ္ဂ, ဂ္ဃ, င်္ဂ	kk, khk, gg, ggh, and ng g respectively	ang ga. lip (အင်္ဂလိပ်‌)^{1}, meaning "English"
ca.	စ္စ, စ္ဆ, ဇ္ဇ, ဇ္ဈ, ဉ္စ, ဉ္ဇ,	cc, chc, jj, jjh, nyc, nyj	wijja (ဝိဇ္ဇာ), meaning "knowledge"
ta.	ဋ္ဋ, ဋ္ဌ, ဍ္ဍ, ဍ္ဎ, ဏ္ဍ	tt, tht, dd, ddh, nd	kanda. (ကဏ္ဍ), meaning "section"
ta.	တ္တ, ထ္ထ, ဒ္ဒ, န္တ, န္ထ, န္ဒ, န္ဓ, န္န	tt, htht, dd, nt, nht, nd, ndh, nn	manta. le: (မန္တလေး), Mandalay, a city in Myanmar
pa.	ပ္ပ, ဗ္ဗ, ဗ္ဘ, မ္ပ, မ္ဗ, မ္ဘ, မ္မ,	pp, bb, bbh, mp, mb, mbh, mm	kambha (ကမ္ဘာ), meaning "world"
ya.	ဿ, လ္လ	ss, ll	pissa (ပိဿာ), meaning viss, a traditional Burmese unit of weight measurement

^{1}ang ga. lip is uncommonly spelt ang ga. lit (အင်္ဂလိတ်).

All consonantal finals are pronounced as glottal stops ([ʔ]), except for nasal finals. All possible combinations are as follows, and correspond to the colors of the initials above:

Consonant	Transcription (with IPA)
k	-ak (-က် [-eʔ]), -wak (ွက် [-weʔ]), -auk (‌ောက် [-auʔ]), -uik (ိုက် [-aiʔ])
c	-ac (-စ် [-iʔ])
t	-at (-တ်‌ [-aʔ]), -wat (ွတ် [-waʔ] or [uʔ]), -ut (ုတ် [-ouʔ]), -it (ိတ်‌ [-eiʔ])
p	-ap (-ပ် [-aʔ] or [-ɛʔ]), -wap (ွပ်‌ [-waʔ] or [-uʔ]), -up (ုပ်) [-ouʔ], -ip (ိပ်‌ [-eiʔ])

Nasalised finals are transcribed differently. Transcriptions of the following diacritical combinations in Burmese for nasalised finals are as follows:

Consonant	Transcription (with IPA)
ng	-ang (-င် [-iɰ̃]), -wang (ွင် ‌[-wiɰ̃]), -aung (‌ောင် [-auɰ̃]), -uing (ိုင် [-aiɰ̃])
ny	-any (-ည် [-e] or [-ei]), -any (-ဉ် -iɰ̃])
n	-an (-န် [-aɰ̃]), -wan (ွန်‌ [-waɰ̃] or [-uɰ̃]), -un (ုန် [-ouɰ̃]), -in (ိန် [-eiɰ̃])
m	-am (-မ်‌ [-aɰ̃]), -wam (ွမ်‌ [-waɰ̃] or [-uɰ̃]), -um (ုမ် [-ouɰ̃]), -im (ိမ် [-eiɰ̃])
m	-am (ံ [-aɰ̃]), -um (ုံ [-ouɰ̃]) (equivalent to -am, but spelt with an anunaasika)

Monophthongs are transcribed as follows:

Burmese			Transcription			IPA			Remarks
Low	High	Creaky	Low	High	Creaky	Low	High	Creaky	Remarks
ာ	ား	-	-a	-a:	-a.	[à]	[á]	[a̰]	Can be combined with medial -w-.
ယ်‌	ဲ	ဲ့	-ai	-ai:	-ai.	[ɛ̀]	[ɛ́]	[ɛ̰]	
ော်‌	ော	ော့	-au	-au:	-au.	[ɔ̀]	[ɔ́]	[ɔ̰]	As a full vowel in the high tone, it is written ဩ and transcribed au:. As a full vowel in the low tone, it is written ဪ and is transcribed au.
ူ	ူး	ု	-u	-u:	-u.	[ù]	[ú]	[ṵ]	As a full vowel in the creaky tone, it is written ဥ and is transcribed u.. As a vowel in low tone, it is written ဦ and transcribed u.
ို	ိုး	ို့	-ui	-ui:	-ui.	[ò]	[ó]	[o̰]	
ီ	ီး	ိ	-i	-i:	i.	[ì]	[í]	[ḭ]	As a full vowel in the creaky tone, it is written ဣ and is transcribed i.. As a full vowel in the high tone, it is written ဤ and transcribed i:.
ေ	ေး	ေ့	-e	-e:	-e.	[è]	[é]	[ḛ]	As a full vowel in the high tone, it is written ဧ and is transcribed ei:. It can be combined with medial -w-.

=== Tones ===
Tone name	Burmese				Transcribed tone mark	Remarks
Tone name	Oral vowels^{1}	IPA	Nasal vowels^{2}	IPA	Transcribed tone mark	Remarks
Low	ာ	à	-န်	àɰ̃	none	
High	ား	á	-န်း	áɰ̃	Colon (:)	In both cases, the colon-like symbol (shay ga pauk) is used to denote the high tone.
Creaky	-	a̰	-န့်	a̰ɰ̃	Full stop (.)	Nasalised finals use the anusvara to denote the creaky tone in Burmese.

^{1} Oral vowels are shown with -.

^{2} Nasal vowels are shown with -န် (-an).

=== Medial consonants ===
A medial is a semivowel that comes before the vowel. Combinations of medials (such as h- and -r-) are possible. They follow the following order in transcription: h-, -y- or -r-, and -w-. In Standard Burmese, there are three pronounced medials. The following are medials in the MLC Transcription System:

Burmese	IPA	Transcription	Remarks
ျ	[j]	-y-^{†}	Its possible combinations are with consonants ka., (က), hka., (ခ), ga. (ဂ), pa. (ပ), hpa. (ဖ), ba. (ဗ), and ma. (မ). The medial is possible with other finals and vowels.
ြ	[j]	-r-^{†}	The aforementioned remarks apply to this medial as well.
ွ	[w]	-w-	Its possible combinations are with consonants ka. (က), hka. (ခ), ga. (ဂ), nga (င), ca (စ), hca (ဆ), ja (ဇ), nya (ည), ta. (တ), hta (ထ), da (ဒ), na (န), pa (ပ), hpa (ဖ), ba (ဗ), bha. (ဘ), ma (မ), ya. (ယ), ra. (ရ), la. (လ), and sa. (သ). The medial is possible with other finals and vowels, using the already mentioned consonants.
ှ^{1}		h-	Its possible combinations are with consonants nga. (င), nya. (ည), na. န), ma. (မ), ya. (ယ)^{‡}, ra. (ရ)^{‡}, and la. (လ).

^{†}The two medials are pronounced the same in Standard Burmese. In dialects such as Rakhine (Arakanese), the latter is pronounced [r].

^{‡}When the medial ှ is spelt with ra. (ရ), its sound becomes hra. [ʃa̰] (ရှ), which was once represented by hsya. (သျှ).

== Abbreviated syllables ==
Formal Burmese has four abbreviated symbols, which are typically used in literary works:

Burmese		IPA	Transcription	
Modern abbreviation	Historic spelling	IPA		
၍	ရုယ္အ်	[jwḛ]		It is a conjunction joining two predicates.
၌	နှိုက်	[n̥aɪʔ]	hnai.	It is a locative particle that acts as a postposition after nouns (at, in, on). It is equivalent to hma (မှာ) in colloquial Burmese.
‌၎င်း, ၎	လည်းကောင်း	[ləɡáʊɰ̃]	lany: kaung:	It acts as a demonstrative noun (this or that) when it precedes a noun. It is also used as a connecting phrase (as well as) between two nouns within a clause.
၏	ဧအ်‌	[ḭ]	e	It is a genitive particle that marks possession of a preceding noun. It follows the possessor and precedes the possessed noun. It is also used as a sentence-final particle at the end of an affirmative sentence, typically in literary or written Burmese.

== See also ==
- Burmese script
- Burmese language
