= John Alexander Stewart (scholar) =

John Alexander Stewart CIE MC
- Born: 1882; Strichen, Aberdeenshire, Scotland
- Died: 1948 (aged 65–66)

Academic background
- Education: University of Aberdeen

Academic work
- Discipline: Linguist
- Institutions: School of Oriental and African Studies
- Main interests: Burmese

John Alexander Stewart CIE MC (1882–1948) was a classical scholar, colonial public servant, and professor of Burmese.

Stewart was born in Strichen, Aberdeenshire, Scotland, and educated at the University of Aberdeen where he graduated with first-class honours in classics in 1903. He passed the Indian civil service examination in 1904 and went to Myanmar in 1905. He worked for five years in the Settlement (Land Revenue) Department where he met J S Furnivall. During the First World War, and the Anglo-Afghan War, Stewart served for 4 1/2 years with the Burma Sappers and Miners in Mesopotamia (where he was awarded the Military Cross) and Persia. He returned to Myanmar and was Commissioner of the Magwe Division in the 1930s. With C W. Dunn he compiled the first Burmese-English dictionary, published under the auspices of the University of Rangoon, in five volumes, the first volume published in 1940, but the project remained incomplete at the time of his death.

He became Professor of Burmese in the University of London and helped found the Department of Southeast Asian Studies at the School of Oriental and African Studies which publishes the SOAS Bulletin of Burma Research.

Academic Career at the University of London:

- Lecturer in Burmese 1933–35;
- Part-time Lecturer in Burmese 1935–36;
- Senior Lecturer in Burmese 1936–37;
- Reader in Burmese, Acting Head (1937–38) then Head of the Department of India, Burma and Ceylon 1937–46;
- Professor of Burmese and Head of the Department of South East Asia and the Islands 1946–48.

== See also ==
- Adoniram Judson, another first compiler (with E.A. Steven) of a Burmese-English dictionary.
- Hla Pe, another compiler of a Burmese-English dictionary
