= Henry Burney =

British soldier and diplomat (1792–1845)

- Born: 27 February 1792; English
- Died: 4 March 1845 (aged 53); Calcutta, India
- Occupation: diplomat
- Spouse: Janet Bannerman
- Children: 13
- Writing career
- Language: English

Henry Burney (27 February 1792 – 4 March 1845), was a British army officer and diplomat for the British East India Company.

== Early life ==
His parents were Richard Thomas Burney, headmaster of the Orphan School at Kidderpore near Calcutta, and Jane Burney. He was a nephew of the English writer Frances Burney.

== Career ==
In 1807 Burney joined the East India Company. In 1818, he was promoted to lieutenant and appointed as an adjutant of the 20th Regiment of Bengal Native Infantry, Penang's acting town-major and military secretary to Governor Bannerman. Later he worked as an agent of the East India Company, collecting material about Burma and Siam, which he made available to England, while participating in the First Anglo–Burmese War (1823–1826). After his 1825 appointment as political emissary to Siam he met King Rama III there the following year, concluding the Burney Treaty and a commercial contract to stimulate development of regional trade between Siam and Europe. Having negotiated a mutually agreed border between Siam and British-occupied Burma, only the exact course of the border at Three Pagodas Pass in Kanchanaburi remained in dispute.

From 1829 Burney was the British resident at King Bagyidaw's court in Ava (the then capital of Burma), where he successfully resolved the dispute over the Kabaw Valley in Burma's favour.

By 1834 he had risen to the rank of Lieutenant Colonel in the Bengal army.

== Personal life ==
Henry Burney married Janet Bannerman (1799–1865), the niece of the governor John Alexander Bannerman of Penang, at George Town (Penang, Malaya) in 1818. The couple had 13 children, eight of whom were living in 1845 when Henry Burney died.

Henry Burney died at sea in 1845 while on his way from Rangoon on sick leave. He was buried in Mission Burial Ground on Park Street in Calcutta.

== Bibliography ==
- Hall, D. G. E. (1961), "British Writers of Burmese History from Dalrymple to Bayfield", in D. G. E. Hall (ed.), Historians of South East Asia, London: Oxford University Press, pp. 255–266 – via archive.org
- Hall, D. G. E. (1974), Henry Burney – A Biography, Oxford University Press – via archive.org

== See also ==
- Henry Burney. The journal of Henry Burney in the capital of Burma, 1830-1832, Univ. of Auckland, 1995, 121 pp. (ISBN 0908689500)
- D.G.E. Hall, Henry Burney: A Political Biography, Oxford Univ. Press, 1974, 330 pp. (ISBN 0197135838)
- D.G.E. Hall, Burney's Comments on the Court of Ava, London, 1957, 314 pp.
- Holmes and Co. (Calcutta), The Bengal Obituary: Or, a Record to Perpetuate the Memory of Departed Worth: Being a Compilation of Tablets and Monumental Inscriptions from Various Parts of the Bengal and Agra Presidencies, to which is added Biographical Sketches and Memoirs of Such as have Pre-Eminently Distinguished Themselves in the History of British India, Since the Formation of the European Settlement to the Present Time, London: 1851, W. Thacker, pp. 208–9
