= Hla Pe =

Emeritus Professor Hla Pe
- လှဘေ
- Born: 8 January 1913; Khaye village, British Burma
- Died: 31 July 2007 (aged 94); Mawlamyine, Mon State, Myanmar
- Education: Rangoon University; University of London
- Occupation: Linguist
- Known for: Burma studies
- Title: Professor of the SOAS University of London
- Term: 1966– 1980
- Spouse: Than Mya

Dr. Hla Pe (Burmese: လှဘေ, pronounced [l̥a̰ pʰè]; 8 January 1913 – 31 July 2007) was a prominent Burmese language linguist and a longtime contributor to the Myanmar–English Dictionary. He was professor of Burmese language and culture at the University of London from 1966 to 1980.

== Early life ==
He was born in Kha-ye village near Mawlamyine, British Burma, where he was brought up by four spinster aunts. The son of a Burmese traditional doctor, he had his early education in the village monastery. He then studied at government high school. After high school, he went to Rangoon University and earned an MA in Burmese in 1938. He was selected for a state scholarship for further studies in London the same year. In 1939, he got a Diploma in Education from the Institute of Education, University of London. In 1944 he obtained his doctorate in Burmese at the University of London's School of Oriental Studies (later renamed the School of Oriental and African Studies).

== Career ==
From 1942 to 1946, he was the news broadcaster, translator and commentator with the BBC Burmese. At the same time he was an assistant editor of the Burmese–English Dictionary. He became an associate editor of the dictionary in 1948. He devoted forty years to writing the dictionary.

Professor Hla Pe taught Burmese language and culture at SOAS from 1948 and was Professor of Burmese at SOAS from 1966 until his retirement in 1980. He returned to Burma after his retirement and settled down in Mawlamyaing with his wife Than Mya. On his return he brought back to Burma his lifelong collection of books, said to be worth about 50,000 USD, for donation to Burmese university libraries. Considered one of the most prominent Burmese scholars and one of the founders of Burma Studies, he has written numerous academic articles for Burma journals and published many books in English and Burmese during his academic career.

== Death ==
Dr Hla Pe died in Mawlamyaing, Myanmar in 2007. His obituary was written by John Okell OBE.

== Selected works ==
- A Burmese-English Dictionary (Part 1 to Part 6) six volumes published from 1941 to 1981 by SOAS (jointly with J.A. Stewart, C.W.Dunn, H.F. Searle, A.J. Allott, J.W.A. Okell)
- Burmese Proverbs (London 1962)
- Konmara Pya Zat (Vol. 1 Introduction and Translation) London 1952
- Manual of Colloquial Burmese (by J.A. Stewart (co-editor with H.F. Searle) 1955

In Burmese

- The Myanmar Buddhist: His Life from the Cradle to the Grave (translated by Dr. Tin Hlaing) Daung Books Rangoon 2000
