= Myanmar Historical Commission =

Research organization

- Formation: 1955; 71 years ago
- Type: Historical research
- Headquarters: Yangon, Myanmar
- Location: Yangon, Myanmar

The Myanmar Historical Commission (Burmese: မြန်မာနိုင်ငံ သမိုင်း ကော်မရှင်; formerly, the Burma Historical Commission) is an academic research organization focused on Burma studies. The commission was founded in 1955 by the Burmese government to produce an official version of national history. It regularly publishes the Bulletin of the Myanmar Historical Commission, and holds conferences in the country. As of 2009, the Commission had published six volumes of modern Burmese history from 1947 onward.

== See also ==
- Burma Research Society
- Royal Historical Commission of Burma

== Bibliography ==
- Ni Ni Myint (2003). "Myanmar Historiography Since 1945". In Abu (Talib Ahmad.), Liok Ee Tan (ed.). New terrains in Southeast Asian history. Ohio University Press. ISBN 9780896802285.
- Khin Maung Nyunt (2009). "The Myanmar Historical Commission".
