= Richard Keith Sprigg =

British linguist (1922–2011)

- Born: 31 March 1922
- Died: 8 September 2011 (aged 89)

Academic work
- Discipline: Linguist
- Institutions: SOAS

Richard Keith Sprigg (31 March 1922 – 8 September 2011) was a British linguist who specialised in the phonology of Asian languages. Sprigg was educated under J. R. Firth and was a member of the first generation of professional British linguists. Also as a consequence Sprigg was an advocate of the prosodic phonological method of Firth. Sprigg worked on several Tibeto-Burman languages including Lepcha, and various Tibetan dialects. He taught for many years at the School of Oriental and African Studies, and retired to Kalimpong, West Bengal, India with his wife Ray, granddaughter of David Macdonald the author of The Land of the Lama and 20 Years in Tibet, until her death.

In 2000 he returned to UK and lived in retirement with his second wife Elisabeth in Crowborough, East Sussex, England, near his son David Edward MacDonald Sprigg and daughter Maya Sprigg.

== Works ==
- Sprigg, Richard Keith (1950). "Hunting the things they say." Himalayan Times, Kalimpong.
- Sprigg, Richard Keith (1954). "Verbal Phrases in Lhasa Tibetan I".Bulletin of the School of Oriental and African Studies 16.1:134–156.
- Sprigg, Richard Keith (1954). "Verbal Phrases in Lhasa Tibetan II".Bulletin of the School of Oriental and African Studies 16.2:320–350.
- Sprigg, Richard Keith (1954). "Verbal Phrases in Lhasa Tibetan III".Bulletin of the School of Oriental and African Studies 16.3:566–591.
- Sprigg, Richard Keith (1955). "The Tonal System of Tibetan (Lhasa Dialect) and the Nominal Phrase." Bulletin of the School of Oriental and African Studies, University of London 17.1:133–153. reprinted in Frank R. Palmer, ed. Prosodic analysis, 112–132. London: Oxford University Press, 1970.
- Sprigg, Richard Keith (1956). "The tonal system of nouns and adjectives in the Lhasa dialect of spoken Tibetan." Proceedings of the 23rd Congress of Orientalists, Cambridge, 1954, 262–263. London: Royal Asiatic Society.
- Sprigg, Richard Keith (1957). "Junction in spoken Burmese." Studies in linguistic analysis (Special volume of the Philological Society), 104–138. Oxford: Blackwell (2nd edition 1962).
- Sprigg, Richard Keith (1959). "Limbu books in the Kiranti Script." Akten des vierundzwanzigsten Internationalen Orientalisten-Kongresses München 28. August bis 4. September 1957. Herbert Franke, ed. Wiesbaden : Deutsche Morgenländische Gesellschaft, in Kommission bei Franz Steiner Verlag. pp. 590–592.
- Sprigg, Richard Keith (1961). "Vowel harmony in Lhasa Tibetan, prosodic analysis applied to interrelated vocalic features of successive syllables." Bulletin of the School of Oriental and African Studies 24: 116–138. reprinted in F.R. Palmer, ed. Prosodic Analysis., 230–252. London: Oxford University Press 1970.
- Sprigg, Richard Keith (1963). "Prosodic analysis and phonological formulae in Tibeto-Burman linguistic comparison." H.L. Shorto, ed. Linguistic comparison in South East Asia and the Pacific. London: School of Oriental and African Studies, 79–108.
- Sprigg, Richard Keith (1963). "A comparison of Arakanese and Burmese based on phonological formulae." Shorto, H.L. (ed.) Linguistic Comparison in South East Asia and the Pacific.London: School of Oriental and African Studies, 109–132.
- Sprigg, Richard Keith (1963). "Vowel harmony in Lhasa Tibetan." Труды двадцать пятого Международного конгресса востоковедов, Москва 9–16 августа 1960 / Trudy dvadt︠s︡atʹ pi︠a︡togo Mezhdunarodnogo kongressa vostokovedov, Moskva 9–16 avgusta 1960, 5:189–194.
- Sprigg, Richard Keith (1964). "Burmese orthography and the tonal classification of Burmese lexical items." Journal of the Burma Research Society 47.2: 415–444.
- Sprigg, Richard Keith (1965). "Prosodic analysis and Burmese syllable-initial features" Anthropological Linguistics 7/6 part 2:59–81, reprinted in Journal of the Burma Research Society 50.2, 1967: 263–284.
- Sprigg, Richard Keith (1966). "Lepcha and Balti Tibetan, tonal or non tonal." Asia Major (New Series) 12: 185–201.
- Sprigg, Richard Keith (1966). "Phonological formulae for the verb in Limbu as a contribution to Tibeto-Burman comparison." Charles Ernest Bazel et al. (eds.): In memory of J.R. Firth. London: Longmans: 431-53
- Sprigg, Richard Keith (1966) "The glottal stop and glottal constriction in Lepcha, and borrowing from Tibetan." Bulletin of Tibetology 3.1: 5–14.
- Sprigg, Richard Keith (1967). "Balti-Tibetan Verb Syllable Finals and a Prosodic Analysis." Asia Major (New Series) 13.1–2: 187–210.)
- Sprigg, Richard Keith (1968). "The role of 'R' in the development of the modern spoken Tibetan dialects." Acta Orientalia Academiae Scientiarum Hungaricae 21.3. 301–311
- Sprigg, Richard Keith (1968). The Phonology of the grammatical constituents of verbal-phrase words in spoken Tibetan (Lhasa Dialect). PhD dissertation, School of Oriental and African Studies, University of London.
- Sprigg, Richard Keith (1970). "The Tibeto-Burman group of languages, and its pioneers." Bulletin of Tibetology 7.1: 17–19.
- Sprigg, Richard Keith (1970). "Vyajñanabhakti, and irregularities in the Tibetan Verb." Bulletin of Tibetology 7.2: 5–20
- Sprigg, Richard Keith (1972). "Assimilation, and the definite nominal particle in Balti Tibetan." Bulletin of Tibetology 9.2: 5–19.
- Sprigg, Richard Keith (1972). "A Polysystemic Approach, in Proto-Tibetan Reconstruction, to Tone and Syllable-Initial Consonant Clusters". Bulletin of the School of Oriental and African Studies 35.3: 546–587.
- Sprigg, Richard Keith (1974). "The lexical item as a phonetic entity." Journal of the International Phonetic Association 4.1: 20–30.
- Sprigg, Richard Keith (1974). "The London-school 'systemic value' concept, and hierarchical versus relational analysis." Proceedings of the Eleventh International Congress of Linguists, Bologna-Florence 1972, 1:667–671. Bologna: il Mulino.
- Sprigg, Richard Keith (1974). "The main features of the Tibetan dialect." Bulletin of Tibetology 11.1: 11–15.
- Sprigg, Richard Keith (1976). "The inefficiency of 'tone change' in Sino-Tibetan descriptive linguistics." Linguistics of the Tibeto-Burman Area 2.2: 173–181.
- Sprigg, Richard Keith (1976). "Tibetan, its relation with other languages." Tibetan Review (New Delhi) 11.4: 14–16.
- Sprigg, Richard Keith (1977). "Tonal units and tonal classification: Panjabi, Tibetan and Burmese." H.S. Gill, ed. Parole and Langue. Pakha Sanjam 8 (1975–76): 1–21.
- Sprigg, Richard Keith (1978). "Phonation types: a re-appraisal" Journal of the International Phonetic Association 8.1–2: 2–17.
- Sprigg, Richard Keith (1979). "The Golok dialect and Written Tibetan past-tense verb forms". Bulletin of the School of Oriental and African Studies 42:53–60
- Sprigg, Richard Keith (1980). "‘Vocalic alternation’ in Balti, the Lhasa, and the Sherpa verb, as a guide to alternation in Written Tibetan, and to Proto-Tibetan Reconstruction". Bulletin of the School of Oriental and African Studies 43:110–122
- Sprigg, Richard Keith (1980). "Vowel harmony in noun-and-particle words in the Tibetan of Baltistan." Bulletin of the School of Oriental and African Studies 43: 511–519/AOH 34: 235–43.
- Sprigg, Richard Keith (1981). "The Chang-Shefts tonal analysis, and the pitch variation of the Lhasa Tibetan tones." Linguistics of the Tibeto-Burman Area 6.1:49–60
- Sprigg, Richard Keith (1982). "The Lepcha language and three hundred years of Tibetan influence in Sikkim." Journal of the Asiatic Society (Calcutta) 24: 16–31.
- Sprigg, Richard Keith (1983). "Hooker's expenses in Sikkim: an early Lepcha text." Bulletin of the School of Oriental and African Studies 46.2: 305–325.
- Sprigg, Richard Keith (1983). "Newari as a language without vowel systems." Nepalese Linguistics 2: 1–22.
- Sprigg, Richard Keith (1984). "The Limbu s-final and t-final verb roots after Michailovsky 1979 and Weidert 1982." Nepalese Linguistic 3: 11–55.
- Sprigg, Richard Keith (1984). "Alphabet, syllabary, and prosodic symbols in the Indic and Arabic scripts of South-East Asia." B.B. Rajapurohit, ed. Papers in phonetics and phonology, 111–140. Conference and Seminar Series, VI. Mysore: Central Institute of Indian Languages.
- Sprigg, Richard Keith (1985). "The Limbu s-final and t-fmal verb roots, after Michailovsky 1979 and Weidert 1982." (substantially the same as 1984a, but with IPA symbols throughout). Linguistics of the Tibeto-Burman Area 8.2 (1985): 1–35
- Sprigg, Richard Keith (1985). "Alphabet or syllabary in South East Asia: 'new wine into old bottles" (substantially the same as 1984b, but with notes and examples in non-roman scripts differently disposed). G. Thurgood, J.A. Matisoff and D. Bradley, eds, Linguistics of the Sino-Tibetan area: the state of the art. Papers presented to Paul K. Benedict for his 71st birthday. Canberra: Pacific Linguistics. 105–115.
- Sprigg, Richard Keith (1986). "The syllable finals of Tibetan loan words in Lepcha orthography." Linguistics of the Tibeto-Burman Area 9.1: 27–46.
- Sprigg, Richard Keith (1987). "‘Rhinoglottophilia’ revisited: observations on ‘the mysterious connection between nasality and glottality.'" Linguistics of the Tibeto-Burman Area 10.1. 44–62.
- Sprigg, Richard Keith (1989). "Oral vowels and nasalized vowels in Lepcha (Rong): as the key to a puzzling variation in spelling.'" Contributions to South-East Asian linguistics: essays in honour of Eugenie J. A. Henderson. J. H. C. S. Davidso, ed. London: School of Orientlal and African Studies. 219–235.
- Sprigg, Richard Keith (1989) "The Root Finals of Bantawa Rai Verbs, and the Congruence of Phonology with Grammar and Lexis." Bulletin of the School of Oriental and African Studies, University of London 52.1: 91–114.
- Sprigg, Richard Keith (1990), "Tone in Tamang and Tibetan and the advantages of keeping register-based tone systems separate from contour-based systems", Linguistics of the Tibeto-Burman Area, vol. 13, no. 1, pp. 33–56
- Sprigg, Richard Keith (1991), "The spelling style pronunciation of Written Tibetan and the hazards of using citation forms in the phonological analysis of spoken Tibetan", in Linguistics of the Tibeto-Burman Area, vol. 14, no. 2, pp. 93–131.
- Sprigg, Richard Keith (1992). "Bantawa Rai s-, t- and z-final verb roots: transitives, intransitives, causatives and directives." Linguistics of the Tibeto-Burman Area 15. 1: 39–52.
- Sprigg, Richard Keith (1993). "Controversy in the tonal analysis of Tibetan." Bulletin of the School of Oriental and African Studies 56: 470–501.
- Sprigg, Richard Keith (1995). "1826: The End of an Era in the Social and Political History of Sikkim." Bulletin of Tibetology. Volume 31, pp 88–92
- Sprigg, Richard Keith (1996). "My Balti-Tibetan and English dictionary, and its predecessors." The Tibet Journal 21.4: 3–22.
- Sprigg, Richard Keith (1996). "A foreigner studies heroes of the Lepcha race." King Gaeboo Achyok Birth Anniversary 1996. Kalimpong: King Gaeboo Achyok Birth Anniversary Committee, 6–25. (reprinted in 2005b: 82–102)
- Sprigg, Richard Keith (1997). "Lepcha orthography: An earlier and later stage." David Bradley ed., Tibeto-Burman languages of the Himalayas (Papers in Southeast Asian Linguistics No 14), Canberra: Pacific Linguistics, 175–182.
- Sprigg, Richard Keith (1997). "A Tonal Analysis of Gurung, with Separate Systems for Register and Contour Pitch Features." Bulletin of the School of Oriental and African Studies 60.3: 448–454.
- Sprigg, Richard Keith (1997). "The oldest dated documents of the Lepchas." Aachuley: A Quarterly Lepcha Bilingual News Magazine (Kalimpong) 1:2, 9–11. (reprinted in 2005b: 16–22)
- Sprigg, Richard Keith (1998). "Original and sophisticated features of the Lepcha and Limbu scripts." Nepalese Linguistics 15, 1–18.
- Sprigg, Richard Keith (1998). "The earliest printed books in Lepcha." Aachuley: A Quarterly Lepcha Bilingual News Magazine (Kalimpong) 2.1: 14–19. (reprinted in 2005b: 52–59)
- Sprigg, Richard Keith (1998). "The Lepcha text of the deed of grant of Darjeeling." Aachuley: A Quarterly Lepcha Bilingual News Magazine (Kalimpong) 2.2: 4–11. (reprinted in 2005b: 32–41)
- Sprigg, Richard Keith (1998). "Dr. Hooker's Lepcha treasurer (1848–49)." Aachuley: A Quarterly Lepcha Bilingual News Magazine (Kalimpong) 2.3: 5–8. (reprinted in 2005b: 60–64)
- Sprigg, Richard Keith (1999). "An appeal to Captain Lloyd by Kazi Gorok, of Ilam (1828)." Aachuley: A Quarterly Lepcha Bilingual News Magazine (Kalimpong) 3.1: 5–11. (reprinted in 2005b: 23–31)
- Sprigg, Richard Keith (1999). "The Lepcha Raja." Aachuley: A Quarterly Lepcha Bilingual News Magazine (Kalimpong) 3.2: 6–7. (reprinted in 2005b: 65–67)
- Sprigg, Richard Keith (1999). "An Anglo-Lepcha and 'Linguistic Survey of India'(1899)." Aachuley: A Quarterly Lepcha Bilingual News Magazine (Kalimpong) 3.3: 5–18. (reprinted in 2005b: 68–81)
- Sprigg, Richard Keith (2002). Balti-English English-Balti dictionary. Richmond: RoutledgeCurzon.
- Sprigg, Richard Keith (2005a). "Types of R Prosodic Piece in a Firthian Phonology of English, and Their Vowel and Consonant Systems". York Papers in Linguistics (Series 2) 4: 125–156.
- Sprigg, Richard Keith (2005b). "The short quantity piece in English lexical items, and its vowel system.' York Papers in Linguistics (Series 2) 4: pp. 157–188.
- Sprigg, Richard Keith (2005c). Shedding some light on the history, language, and literature of the Lepchas. Kalimpong: Indigenous Lepcha Tribal Association.
- Sprigg, Richard Keith (2007). "Tibetan orthography, the Balti dialect, and a contemporary phonological theory." Linguistics of the Himalayas and beyond. Roland Bielmeier and Felix Haller, eds. Berlin: Mouton de Gruyter.

=== Reviews ===
- Sprigg, Richard Keith (1967). Review of 'The Lepchas: Culture and Religion of a Himalayan People 2. by Halfdan Siiger; Jorgen Rischel.' Man, 2 (3). p. 487.
- Sprigg, Richard Keith (1967). Review of Grundlagen der Phonetik des Lhasa-Dialektes by Eberhardt Richter and A Manual of Spoken Tibetan (Lhasa dialect), by Kun Chang and Betty Shefts Bulletin of the School of Oriental and African Studies 30.1: 210–216.
- Sprigg, Richard Keith (1968) A Tibeti mássalhangzókapsolatok fonetikai problémái, translated A. Róna-Tas. Tudományos Akadémia I, Oszt. Kozl. 25: 161–167.
- Sprigg, Richard Keith (1967). (Review of Róna-Tas Tibeto-Mongolica: The Loanwords of Mongour and the Development of the Archaic Tibetan Dialects. Indo-Iranian Monographs 7. The Hague: Mouton. 1966). Bulletin of the School of Oriental and African Studies 30.1: 216–217.
- Sprigg, Richard Keith (1968). Review of Robbins Burling, Proto-Lolo-Burmese. Bulletin of the School of Oriental and African Studies 31.3: 648–649.
- Sprigg, Richard Keith (1969) 'Pradyumna P. Karan: Bhutan: a physical and aultural geography.' Bulletin of the School of Oriental and African Studies, 32 (1). p. 231.
- Sprigg, Richard Keith (1970). Review of D.N.S. Bhat, Boro vocabulary. Bulletin of the School of Oriental and African Studies 33.2: 419–420.
- Sprigg, Richard Keith (1971). Review of D.N.S. Bhat, Tangkhur Naga vocabulary. Bulletin of the School of Oriental and African Studies 34.2: 427–428.
- Sprigg, Richard Keith (1972). Review article of John Okell, A reference grammar of colloquial burmese. Journal of the Royal Asiatic Society 2: 163–171.
- Sprigg, Richard Keith (1973). (Review of Paul Benedict. A Conspectus of Sino-Tibetan Cambridge University Press. 1972) Asia Major (New Series) 19.1: 100–106.
- Sprigg, Richard Keith (1974). (Review of James A. Matisoff's) "The Loloish Tonal Split Revisited." Bulletin of the School of Oriental and African Studies 37.1: 259–262.
- Sprigg, Richard Keith (1975). (Review of Martine Mazaudon, Phonologie Tamang.) Bulletin of the School of Oriental and African Studies 38.2: 461–463.
- Sprigg, Richard Keith (1976). (Review of K.S.G. Gowda, Ao grammar.) Bulletin of the School of Oriental and African Studies 39.2: 513.
- Sprigg, Richard Keith (1978). (Review of Roy A. Miller, Studies in the grammatical tradition of Tibet.) Bulletin of the School of Oriental and African Studies 41.1: 184–185.
- Sprigg, Richard Keith (1979) 'A Descriptive Analysis of the Boro Language by Pramod Chandra Bhattacharya.' Bulletin of the School of Oriental and African Studies, 42 (2). pp. 393–394.
- Sprigg, Richard Keith (1986). (Review of Roland Bielmeier, Das Märchen vom Prinzen Čobzaŋ). Linguistics of the Tibeto-Burman Area 9.2: 83–89.
- Sprigg, Richard Keith (1989). (Review of A Grammar of Limbu by George van Driem.) Bulletin of the School of Oriental and African Studies 52.1:163-5
- Sprigg, Richard Keith (1990). (Nepali: A National Language and Its Literature by M. J. Hutt). Bulletin of the School of Oriental and African Studies 53.1: 155–157.

== Works in Honour of R. K. Sprigg ==
- Prosodic analysis and Asian linguistics: to honour R.K. Sprigg. David Bradley, Eugénie J.A. Henderson, and Martine Mazaudon, eds. Canberra: Dept. of Linguistics, Research School of Pacific Studies, Australian National University, 1989.

== Obituaries of R. K. Sprigg ==
- Kelly, John (2012). "In Memoriam: Richard Keith Sprigg (1922–2011)." Journal of the International Phonetic Association 42.1: 119–120.
- Heleen Plaisier (2011). "Richard Keith Sprigg (1922–2011)." European Bulletin of Himalayan Research 38: 166–168.
- Mazaudon, Martine (2011). "Obituary of Richard Keith Sprigg." Linguistics of the Tibeto-Burman Area 34.2: 133.
