= Tilman Frasch =

Tilman Frasch is a German historian working at Manchester Metropolitan University. He studies Burmese historical sources of the Pagan period. Frasch received his PhD in Heidelberg in 1994 with a work about the Pagan kingdom, titled Pagan: Stadt und Staat.

In 2015, Frasch identified Nissaya documents in the Trafford Council archive.

== Works ==
- Frasch, Tilman (1996). Pagan: Stadt und Staat. Stuttgart: F. Steiner.
- Frasch, Tilman (1998). "The Mt. Thetso Inscription Re-examined." Myanmar Historical Research Journal 2: 109-126
- Frasch, Tilman (1998). "King Nadaungmya's Great Gift". Études Birmanes en hommage à Denise Bernot. Pierre Pichard and François Robinne, eds. (Études thematiques 9). Paris: École française d'Extrême-Orient: 27–35.
- Frasch, Tilman (2002). "Coastal Peripheries during the Pagan Period," in Jos Gommans/Jacques Leider (eds.), The Maritime Frontier of Burma. Exploring Political, Cultural and Commercial Interaction in the Indian Ocean World, 1200-1800, Amsterdam: KITLV Press: 59-78
- Frasch, Tilman (2004). "Notes on Dipavamsa: An Early Publication by U Pe Maung Tin". The Journal of Burma Studies, NIU.
- Frasch, Tilman (2005). "Inscriptions of Bagan, edited and translated," in Essays in Commemoration of the Golden Jubilee of the Myanmar Historical Commission, ed. by Ministry of Education, Yangon: 134-148
- Frasch, Tilman (2008). "Measuring Burmese Soil: Some Unknown Words and Practices," in Pierre Le Roux et al. (eds.), Poids et mesures en Asie du Sud-est, vol. 2, Paris: l'Ecole Française d'Extrème Orient : 625–633.
