= Myanmar Language Commission =

Government body of the Burmese language

- မြန်မာစာအဖွဲ့ Myanmaza Aphwe

Agency overview
- Preceding agency: Literary and Translation Commission
- Jurisdiction: Burma (Myanmar)
- Headquarters: Nay Pyi Taw
- Parent agency: Ministry of Education
- Website: www.myanmarlanguagecommission.myn.asia

The Myanmar Language Commission (Burmese: မြန်မာစာအဖွဲ့; formerly Burmese Language Commission; abbreviated MLC) is the pre-eminent government body on matters pertaining to the Burmese language. It is responsible for several projects including the Myanmar–English Dictionary (1993) and MLC Transcription System for Romanization of Burmese.

== Establishment ==
MLC's predecessor, the Literary and Translation Commission (ဘာသာပြန်နှင့် စာပေပြုစုရေး ကော်မရှင်), was set up by the Union Revolutionary Council in August 1963, tasked with publishing an official standard Burmese dictionary, Burmese speller, manual on Burmese composition, compilation of Burmese lexicon, terminology, and translation, compilation and publication of textbooks, reference books, and periodicals for educational use.

The commission was re-established as the Burmese Language Commission (BLC) on 15 September 1971.
