= SOAS Bulletin of Burma Research =

- Discipline: Asian studies, Asian history
- Language: English
- Edited by: Michael W. Charney

Publication details
- History: 2003–2008
- Publisher: School of Oriental and African Studies

Standard abbreviations
- ISO 4: SOAS Bull. Burma Res.

Indexing
- ISSN: 1479-8484

Links
- Journal homepage

The SOAS Bulletin of Burma Research is an academic journal specializing in Burma studies and history that was published twice a year at the School of Oriental and African Studies at the University of London. It was last published in 2008.

Articles included original research as well as reprints of important historical sources. The journal also contained book reviews, abstracts for recent doctoral dissertations, and announcements.

The journal was published in PDF format with a small number of hard copies deposited in selected libraries.
