= Burma Research Society =

Burmese academic society devoted to historical research

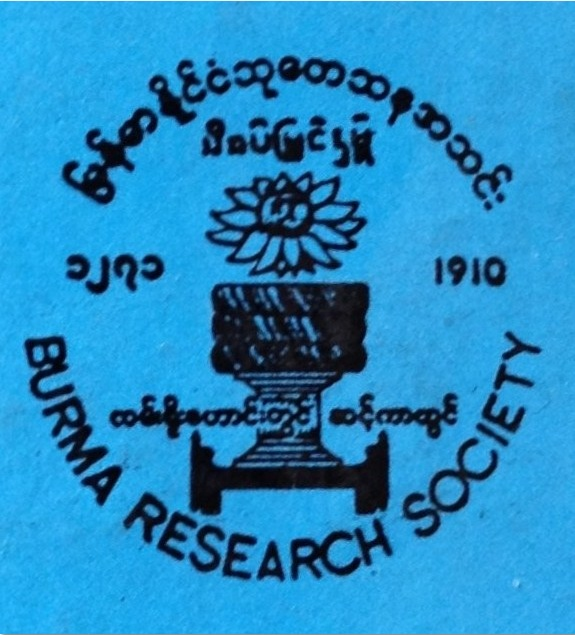
- Abbreviation: BRS
- Formation: 29 March 1910; 116 years ago
- Dissolved: 29 December 1980
- Type: Historical research
- Headquarters: Yangon
- Location: Yangon

The Burma Research Society (Burmese: မြန်မာနိုင်ငံ သုတေသန အသင်း) was an academic society devoted to historical research of Burma (Myanmar). Its aims were "the investigation and encouragement of Art, Science and Literature in relation to Burma and the neighbouring countries".

The society was founded on 29 March 1910 at a meeting held at the Bernard Free Library in Yangon by J S Furnivall, J A Stewart, Gordon H Luce, Pe Maung Tin and Charles Duroiselle. It published original research which appeared in the Journal of the Burma Research Society. The Journal of the Burma Research Society (1911–1977) consists of 59 volumes, being 136 journals comprising more than 1,300 articles. Since 1962, publication has been subject to government regulation. The society also published its Fiftieth Anniversary Publications (Rangoon: Burma Research Society, 1960–61. 2 vols). The first volume consisted of papers read at the society's fiftieth anniversary conference, and the second, 524 pages, reprinted a selection of articles from earlier issues of the journal.

As well as publishing the journal, the Burma Research Society also published Burmese historical and literary manuscript texts and prescribed school textbooks.
