= Office of Global Women's Issues =

United States government agency

The Secretary's Office of Global Women's Issues is located within the United States Department of State. In 2009, Melanne Verveer was appointed to be the first Ambassador-at-Large for Global Women's Issues. From September 2013 to May, 2017, Catherine M. Russell was appointed to this position. From May 2017 through December 2019, there was no ambassador for this office. Kelley Currie, a political appointee, joined the Global Women's Issues Office as U.S. Ambassador-at-Large in January 2020. Geeta Rao Gupta is the current Ambassador-at-Large for the office as of May 18, 2023.

The Office of Global Women's Issues (S/GWI) works to ensure that the rights of women and girls are fully integrated into the formulation and conduct of United States foreign policy. Working with the White House, USAID, the Department of Defense, and other agencies, as well as with civil society and the private sector, the Department of State has launched multiple and wide-ranging global initiatives to promote women's social and economic development, integrate women into peace and security building, address and prevent gender-based violence, and ensure women's full participation in civic and political life.

The Obama Administration made advancing the status of women and girls a central element of U.S. foreign policy, as articulated in the Quadrennial Diplomacy and Development Review and the Department of State's Policy Guidance on Promoting Gender Equality to Achieve Our National Security and Foreign Policy Objectives. Further, on January 30, 2013, President Obama signed a Presidential Memorandum on gender equality, ensuring that an Ambassador-at-Large for Global Women's Issues will continue to play a leading role in U.S. efforts to advance women's rights around the world. And in March 2016, the Obama Administration launched the U.S. Global Strategy to Empower Adolescent Girls, to protect the rights of this age group via international legal and policy frameworks.

Secretary of State Hillary Clinton stated in connection with the Office of Global Women's Issues, "When the Security Council passed Resolution 1325, we tried to make a very clear statement, that women are still largely shut out of the negotiations that seek to end conflicts, even though women and children are the primary victims of 21st century conflict."

Secretary of State John Kerry said, "No country can get ahead if it leaves half of its people behind. This is why the United States believes gender equality is critical to our shared goals of prosperity, stability, and peace, and why investing in women and girls worldwide is critical to U.S. foreign policy."

Women's issues are also a major focus of the United Nations Organization.

== Women, Peace, and Security ==
The United Nations Security Council adopted resolution (S/RES/1325) on women and peace and security on 31 October 2000. The resolution reaffirms the important role of women in the prevention and resolution of conflicts, peace negotiations, peace-building, peacekeeping, humanitarian response and in post-conflict reconstruction and stresses the importance of their equal participation and full involvement in all efforts for the maintenance and promotion of peace and security. Resolution 1325 urges all actors to increase the participation of women and incorporate gender perspectives in all United Nations peace and security efforts. It also calls on all parties to conflict to take special measures to protect women and girls from gender-based violence, particularly rape and other forms of sexual abuse, in situations of armed conflict. The resolution provides a number of important operational mandates, with implications for Member States and the entities of the United Nations system.

To support these efforts, the United States’ first-ever National Action Plan on Women, Peace, and Security (NAP), was released in December 2011, accompanied by Executive Order 13595, which together aim to ensure that women participate equally in preventing conflict and building peace in countries threatened and affected by war, violence, and insecurity. The NAP outlines U.S. government commitments toward: ensuring that women participate more fully in peace negotiations and reconstruction; protecting women and children from harm and abuse in conflict affected areas; promoting women's roles in conflict prevention; and addressing the needs of women and girls in disaster and crisis response.

In August, 2012, the Department of State released the U.S. Department of State Implementation Plan of the NAP: The plan provides guidance for how the Department, both in Washington and at U.S. embassies and consulates, can advance efforts under the U.S. National Action Plan on Women, Peace, and Security. The Department's implementation of the NAP demonstrates its commitment to furthering the promotion of gender equality in service of U.S. foreign policy and national security. The Secretary's Office of Global Women's Issues leads the oversight and coordination of the NAP and the Department's Implementation Plan.

== Staff ==
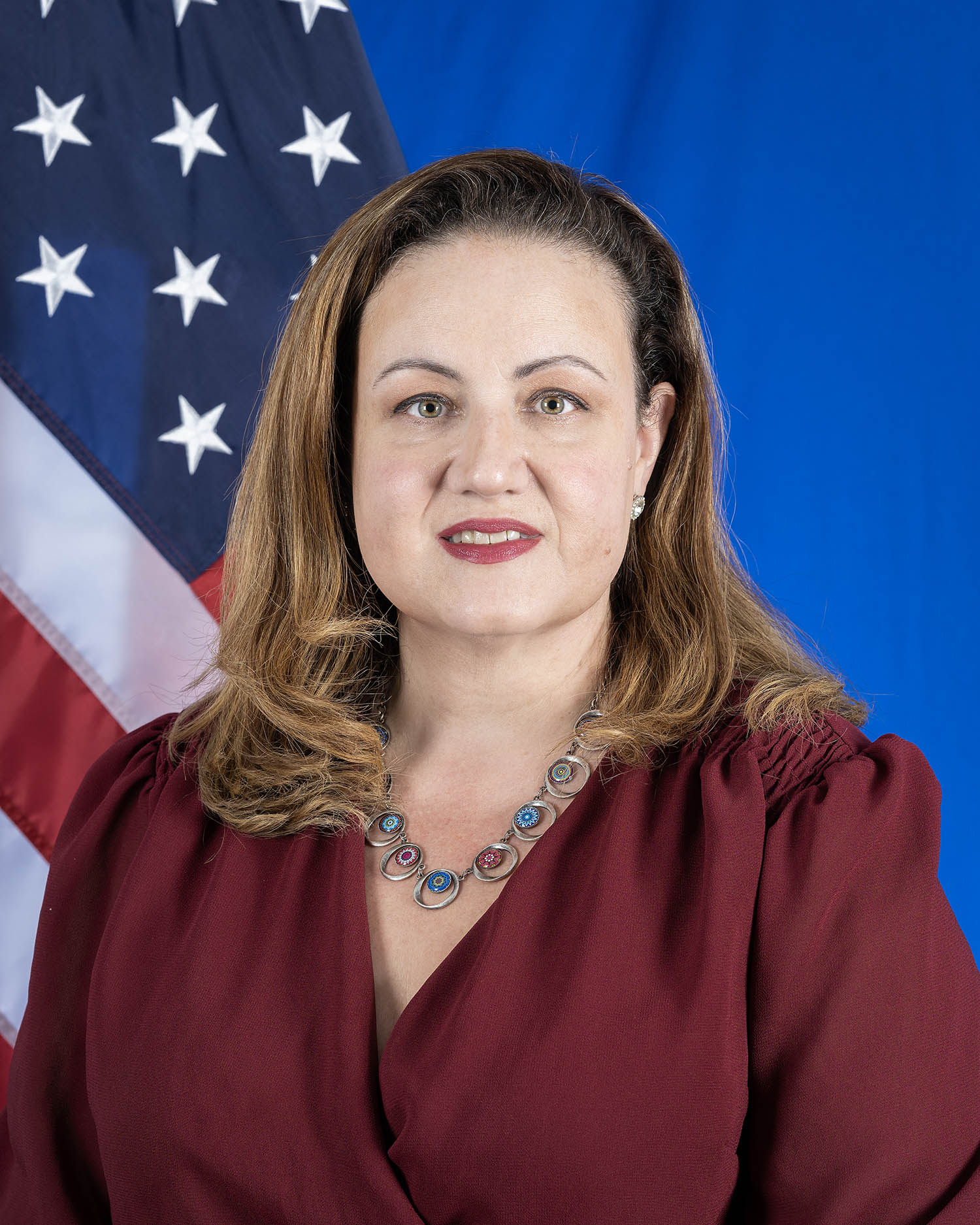
Katrina Fotovat

- Kat Fotovat is currently the Senior Official in the Office of Global Women's Issues and has been since January 2021.
- Kelley Currie, a political appointee, joined the Global Women's Issues Office as U.S. Ambassador-at-Large in January 2020.
- Melanne Verveer, former U.S. Ambassador-at-Large for Global Women's Issues is presently the executive director of the Institute for Women, Peace, and Security at Georgetown University.
- Catherine M. Russell, former U.S. Ambassador-at-Large for Global Women's Issues

== Global programs ==
The Secretary's Office of Global Women's Issues currently supports the following ongoing programs and small grants:

- The Abbott Fund for Supporting Burmese Women
  - Donated $1 million for programs to empower Burmese women and girls in relation to economic development and participation, improved healthcare, the response to gender-based violence, and increased access to education. This initiative currently supports 16 projects in Burma.
- Global Women, Peace, and Security (GWPS) Initiative
  - This initiative was launched in 2012 to support sustainable projects to advance the goals committed to by the United States Department of State in the U.S. National Action Plan on Women Peace, and Security. The GWPS Initiative currently supports 32 projects in 20 countries.
- Secretary's Innovation Award for the Empowerment of Women and Girls
  - This award was created following a 2010 donation of $1.5 million by the Rockefeller Foundation to identify and support ideas that have the power to transform the lives of women and girls. The award is given to three organizations working in India, Kenya, and Tanzania and aims to harness the power of innovation to improve economic opportunities, address environmental challenges, increase food security, and enhance children's access to primary education.
- S/GWI-PEPFAR Gender-Based Violence Initiative
  - This program, launched in 2012, is in partnership with the Secretary's Office of the Global AIDS Coordinator, supports organizations working address the link between gender-based violence and HIV/AIDS. This joint initiative supports 32 projects in 25 countries.
- Women's Entrepreneurship in the Americas (WEAmericas) Small Grants Initiative
  - In 2012, the WalMart Foundation donated $1.5 million for projects to support women-owned businesses and women entrepreneurs in Latin America and the Caribbean. This initiative currently supports 24 projects in 24 countries.
- Afghan Women's Leadership Initiative
  - In 2013, the Office of Global Women's Issue's created the Afghan Women's Leadership Initiative (AWLI). The initiative has invested $10 million into new and existing programs within 7 of Afghanistan's 34 provinces, all of which aim to bring gender equity and economic prosperity for women in the country. AWLI has partnered alongside non-profits to help fund the Initiative to Educate Afghan Women (IEAW), to empower women and girls to pursue education and participate in their community's workforce.
  - AWLI supports women's protection centres like Women for Afghan Women (WAW), to aid women in crisis, escaping dangerous situations at home, forced marriage, and honor killings.
  - The Afghan Women's Leadership Initiative partnered with the International Development Law Organization (IDLO) in 2010 to launch Afghanistan's first Violence against Women unit (VAW). VAW attempts to bring justice to women whose rights have not been upheld under the Constitution of Afghanistan. Violence against women in Afghanistan is an ongoing cultural issue and has shocked the world, as did the brutal murder of Farkhunda Malikzada, a 27-year-old Afghan woman attacked in Kabul by a mob after being falsely accused of burning the Quran.
