= Donilon =

Donilon is a surname. Notable people with the surname include:

- Mike Donilon (born c. 1959), American lawyer and campaign consultant
- Thomas E. Donilon (born 1955), American lawyer, business executive, and 23rd National Security Advisor
