= United States Ambassador-at-Large for Global Women's Issues =

United States diplomat

Ambassador-at-Large of the United States for Global Women's Issues
- Seal of the United States Department of State
- Department of State
- Nominator: President of the United States
- Inaugural holder: Melanne Verveer
- Formation: 2009
- Abolished: July 18, 2025
- Website: U.S. Office - GWI

The ambassador-at-large for global women's issues was the ambassador-at-large who headed the Office of Global Women's Issues in the United States Department of State, with the rank of assistant secretary.

The position was created by the Barack Obama administration in 2009. The first ambassador-at-large was Melanne Verveer, who served from April 6, 2009, until she was replaced by Catherine M. Russell on May 8, 2013. The post was vacant from January 20, 2017, until Ambassador Kelley Eckels Currie was confirmed by the Senate and took office on January 14, 2020. Currie left the post on January 20, 2021, and the position was vacant from January 20, 2021, to May 18, 2023. The Senior Official performing the duties of the office during this time was Katrina Fotovat. On May 18, 2023, Geeta Rao Gupta began work as the next Senate-confirmed ambassador-at-large.

The Department of State's Office of Global Women's Issues ensures that the rights of women and girls are fully integrated into the formulation and conduct of United States foreign policy. Working with the White House, USAID, the Department of Defense, and other agencies, as well as with civil society and the private sector, the United States Department of State has launched multiple and wide-ranging global initiatives to promote women's social and economic development, integrate women into peace and security building, address and prevent gender-based violence, and ensure women's full participation in civic and political life.

Accomplishments of the Office of Global Women's issues to date include health care and police training to help survivors of sexual violence in the Congo and support for female entrepreneurs in the Americas.

The ambassadorship and the Office of Global Women's Issues were eliminated by the Trump administration in 2025.

== List of ambassadors ==
#	Image	Name	Appointment	Left office	President served under
1		Melanne Verveer	April 6, 2009	May 8, 2013	Barack Obama
2		Catherine Russell	August 26, 2013	January 20, 2017	Barack Obama
-		Vacant	January 20, 2017	January 14, 2020	Donald Trump
3		Kelley Eckels Currie	January 14, 2020	January 20, 2021	Donald Trump
-		Vacant	January 20, 2021	May 18, 2023	Joe Biden
4		Geeta Rao Gupta	May 18, 2023	January 20, 2025	Joe Biden
