= Paulo Sérgio Pinheiro =

Brazilian legal scholar (born 1944)

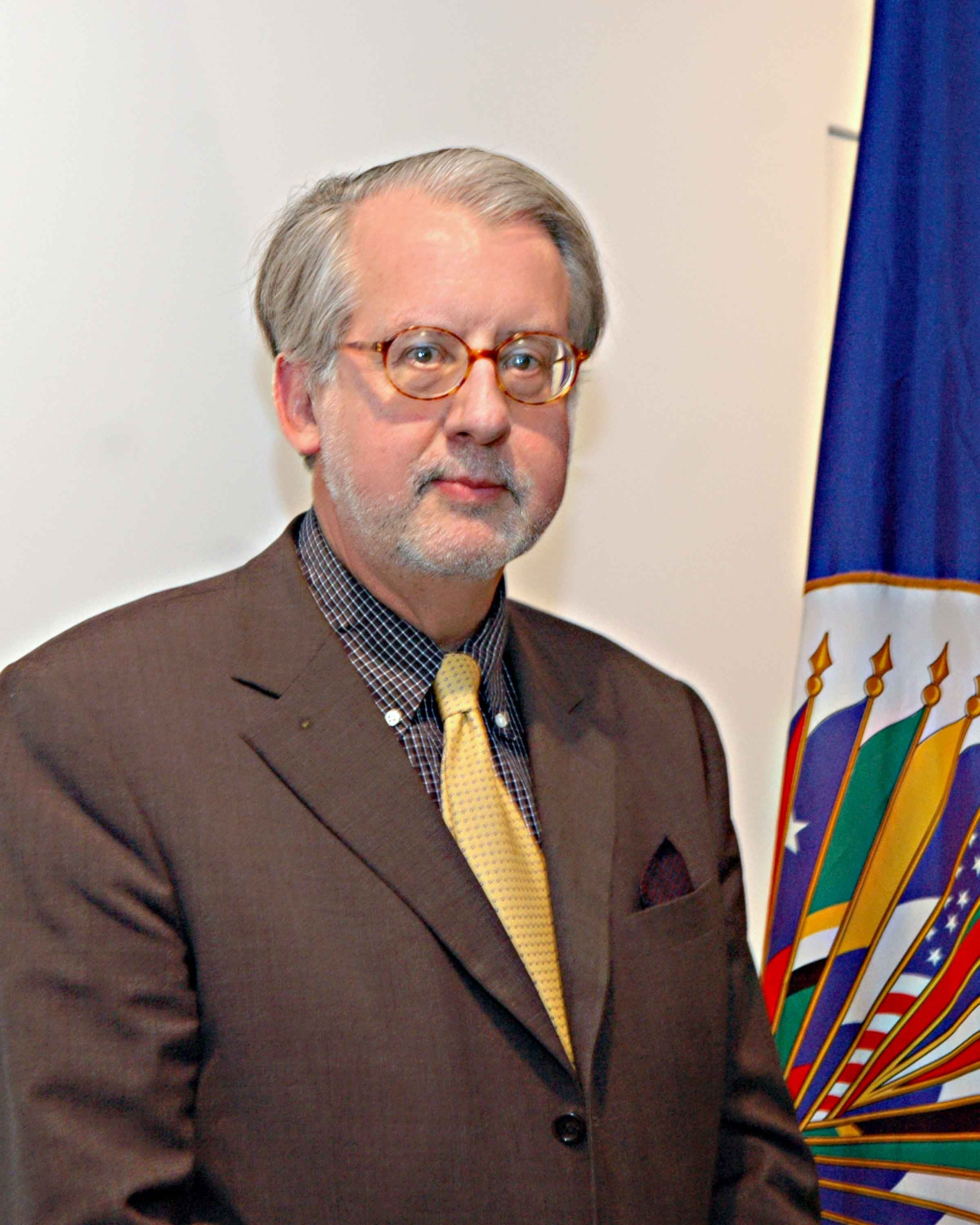
Paulo Sérgio Pinheiro

Paulo Sérgio Pinheiro (born 8 January 1944) is a Brazilian legal scholar known for his work within the United Nations System as a Human Rights expert.

== Career ==
Pinheiro was born in Rio de Janeiro. He has a long career in academia, having held academic positions at the University of São Paulo, among others.

Within the United Nations System, he served as the Special Rapporteur on the situation of human rights in Myanmar from 2000 to 2008. He also served as United Nations Special Rapporteur for Burundi from 1995 to 1999, and was a member of the Sub-Commission on the Promotion and Protection of Human Rights. In 2003, Secretary-General Kofi Annan appointed Pinheiro as an independent expert, with the rank of Assistant Secretary-General, to prepare an in-depth study into the global phenomenon of violence against children, which was presented to the General Assembly in 2006.

Pinheiro served as one of the seven commissioners of the Organization of American States's Inter-American Commission on Human Rights for the 2004–2011 period, with special responsibility for the rights of children Domestically, he served as federal Secretary of State for Human Rights under President Fernando Henrique Cardoso.

In 2011, Pinheiro was appointed chair of the International Commission of Inquiry for Syria. In August 2025, the Commission released a devastating report concluding that war crimes were likely committed by both interim government forces and loyalists to Syria's former regime during the March coastal violence.
