= Tom Andrews (American politician) =

American politician

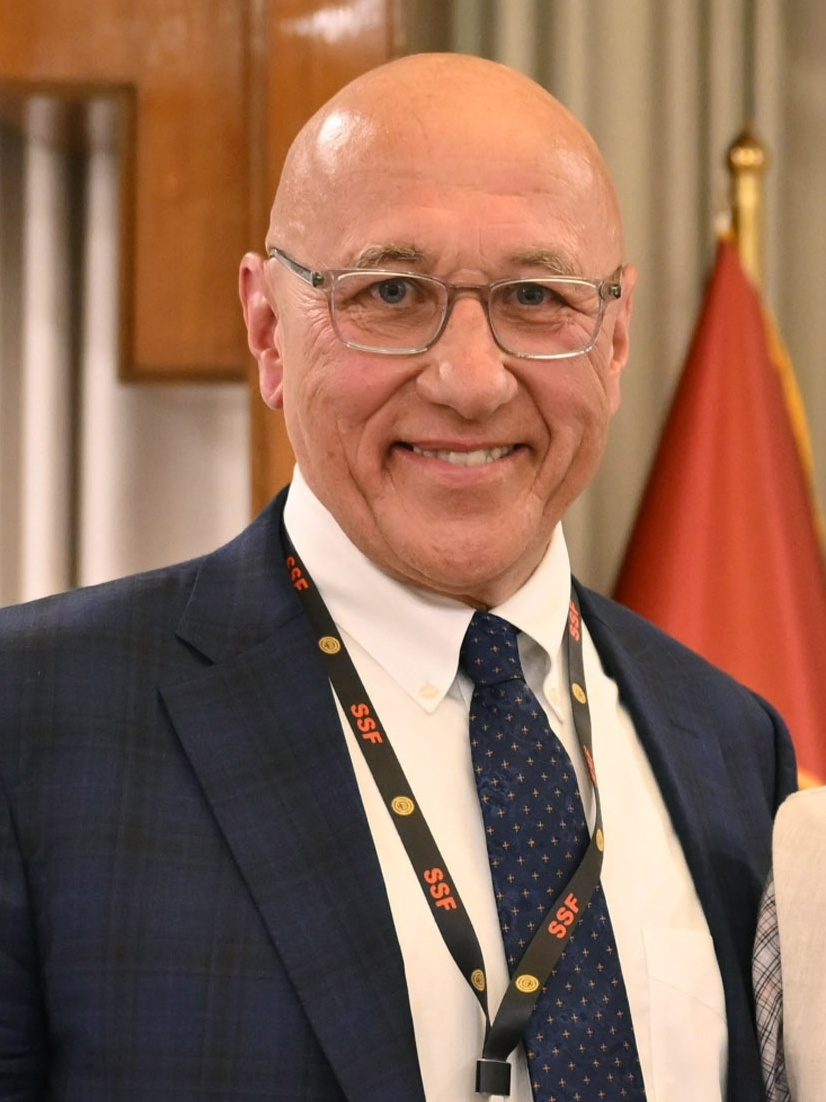
- Andrews in Dhaka (2025)

United Nations Special Rapporteur on the Situation of Human Rights in Cambodia
- Incumbent
- Assumed office April 2026
- Preceded by: Vitit Muntarbhorn

United Nations Special Rapporteur on Human Rights in Myanmar
- In office March 2020 – April 2026
- Secretary General: António Guterres
- Preceded by: Yanghee Lee
- Succeeded by: Kelly Currie

Member of the U.S. House of Representatives from Maine's 1st district
- In office January 3, 1991 – January 3, 1995
- Preceded by: Joseph E. Brennan
- Succeeded by: James B. Longley Jr.

Member of the Maine Senate from the 30th district
- In office January 1985 – 1990
- Preceded by: Gerard Conley, Sr.
- Succeeded by: Gerard Conley Jr.

Member of the Maine House of Representatives from the 21st district
- In office January 1983 – January 1985
- Preceded by: David Brenerman
- Succeeded by: ???

Personal details
- Born: Thomas Hiram Andrews; March 22, 1953 (age 73) Brockton, Massachusetts, U.S.
- Party: Democratic
- Spouse: Gloria Totten
- Education: Bowdoin College (BA)

Thomas Hiram Andrews (born March 22, 1953) is an American non-profit executive, and former Democratic congressman from Maine.

== Early life and career ==
A 1976 graduate of Bowdoin College and alumnus of the Alpha Rho Upsilon fraternity, Andrews served in the Maine House of Representatives (1983–1985) and Maine State Senate (1985–1990).

== Congress ==
In 1990, he was elected to the first of two terms in the U.S. House of Representatives.

In his first congressional election, Andrews defeated the former Congressman Dave Emery in the race to succeed Democrat Joe Brennan. In his only re-election, Andrews soundly defeated Linda Bean, a descendant of L. L. Bean.

=== Senate campaign ===
In 1994, he did not run for re-election to the House but declared his candidacy for the U.S. Senate seat being vacated by the retiring Democrat George J. Mitchell, then the Senate Majority Leader. Andrews lost the Senate election to his 2nd District colleague, Republican Olympia Snowe, by a wide margin.

== Later career ==
Andrews served as National Director of Win Without War. He has served on the boards of Council for a Livable World's PeacePAC (as Chairman), and the U.S. foreign policy reform group Just Foreign Policy.

In 2016, he became the CEO of the Unitarian Universalist Service Committee.

=== Myanmar ===
In 2020, Andrews was appointed as the United Nations Special Rapporteur on Human Rights in Myanmar by the United Nations Human Rights Council. He submitted his final report on 13 May 2026

== Electoral results ==
1990 U.S. House election: Maine District 1
Party	Candidate	Votes	%
Democratic	Thomas H. Andrews	167,623	60.11%
Republican	David Emery	110,836	39.74%
	write-ins	413	0.15%
Majority		56,787	20.36%
Turnout		278,872	
Democratic hold			

1992 U.S. House election: Maine District 1
Party	Candidate	Votes	%
Democratic	Thomas H. Andrews (Incumbent)	232,696	64.97%
Republican	Linda Bean	125,236	34.97%
	write-ins	216	0.06%
Majority		107,460	30.00%
Turnout		358,148	
Democratic hold			

Maine U.S. Senate Election 1994
Party	Candidate	Votes	%	±%
Republican	Olympia Snowe	308,244	60.24%	
Democratic	Tom Andrews	186,042	36.36%	
Independent	Plato Truman	17,205	3.36%	

U.S. House of Representatives
Preceded by Joseph E. Brennan	Member of the U.S. House of Representatives from Maine's 1st congressional district 1991–1995	Succeeded by James Longley Jr.
Party political offices
Preceded by George J. Mitchell	Democratic nominee for U.S. Senator from Maine (Class 1); 1994	Succeeded by Mark Lawrence
U.S. order of precedence (ceremonial)
Preceded by Jerry Carl as Former U.S. Representative	Order of precedence of the United States as Former U.S. Representative	Succeeded by Bruce Poliquin as Former U.S. Representative
