= Melanne Verveer =

American diplomat (born 1944)

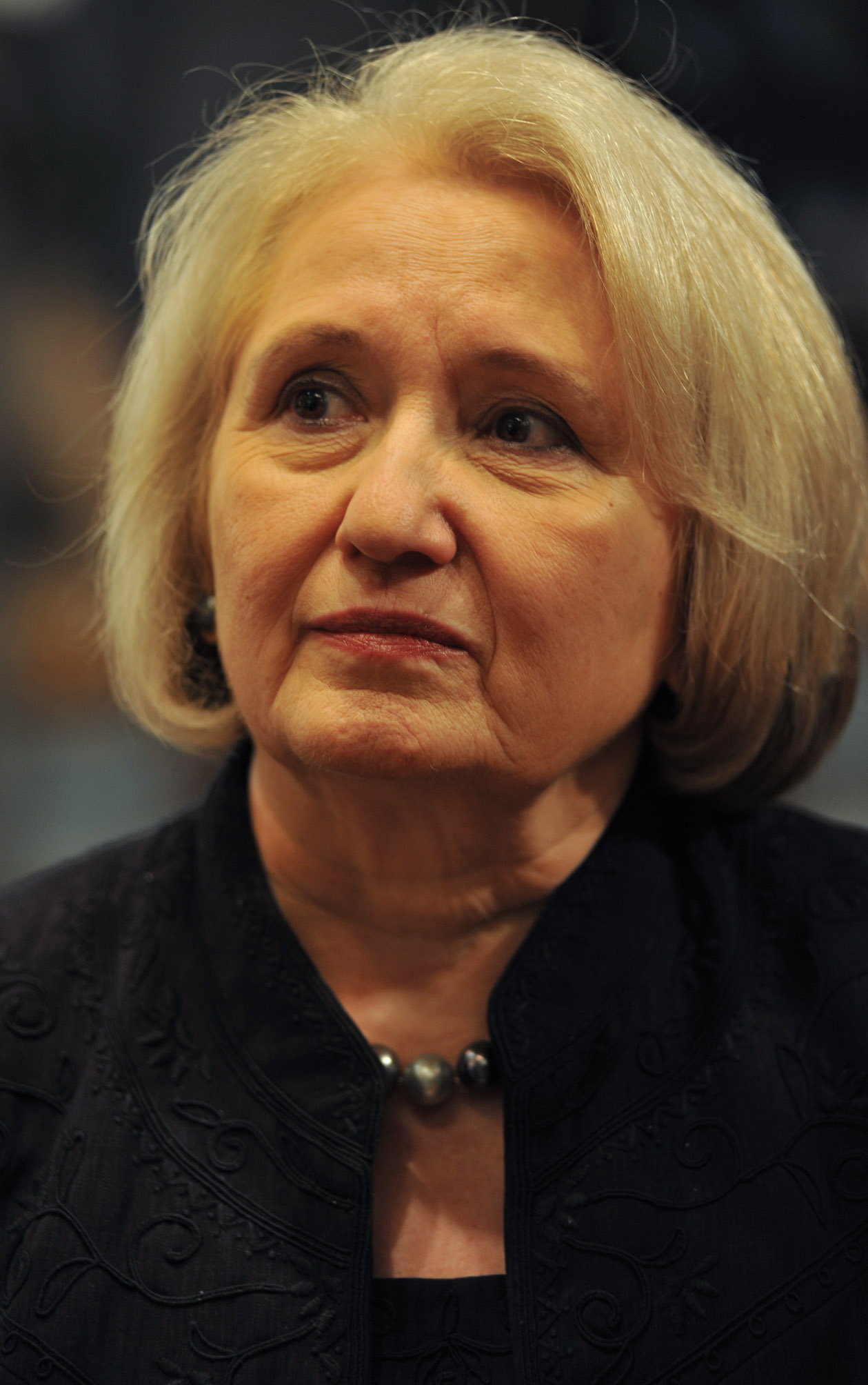
- Verveer in 2009

1st United States Ambassador-at-Large for Global Women's Issues
- In office April 6, 2009 – May 8, 2013
- President: Barack Obama
- Preceded by: Position established
- Succeeded by: Catherine Russell

Chief of Staff to the First Lady of the United States
- In office June 1, 1997 – January 20, 2001
- President: Bill Clinton
- First Lady: Hillary Clinton
- Preceded by: Maggie Williams
- Succeeded by: Andrea Ball

Personal details
- Born: June 24, 1944 (age 82) Pottsville, Pennsylvania, U.S.
- Party: Democratic
- Education: Georgetown University (BS, MS)

Melanne Verveer (born June 24, 1944) is an American former political adviser who is the executive director of the Georgetown Institute for Women, Peace, and Security at Georgetown University. She also holds positions as a founding partner of Seneca Point Global, a women's strategy firm, and as a co-founder of Seneca Women. Verveer co-authored the book Fast Forward: How Women Can Achieve Power and Purpose with Kim Azzarelli.

From April 6, 2009, to May 8, 2013, Verveer served as the first United States Ambassador-at-Large for Global Women's Issues, a position established by President Barack Obama. During her tenure, she directed the Office of Global Women's Issues.

Previously, Verveer served as the chair and co-CEO of Vital Voices Global Partnership, which she co-founded with Hillary Clinton in 2001. Vital Voices is a global NGO that supports emerging female leaders who are advancing economic, political and social progress in their societies.

During the Clinton administration, Verveer served as assistant to the president and as chief of staff to First Lady Hillary Clinton. Among her duties was overseeing Hillary Clinton's global initiatives on women's rights as human rights.

Prior to serving in the White House, she was executive director of People for the American Way, a progressive advocacy group, where she was involved in the passage of civil rights legislation. Earlier, she was Coordinator for Civil Rights and Urban Affairs for the U.S. Catholic Conference. She served on the staff of US Senator George McGovern and Representative Marcy Kaptur.

She is a member of the Council on Foreign Relations, the Trilateral Commission and the World Bank Advisory Council on Gender and Development. She served as the 2013 Humanitas visiting professor at Cambridge University. In 2008, the President of Ukraine awarded her the Order of Princess Olga. She holds several honorary degrees and is the recipient of numerous awards, including the U.S. Secretary's Distinguished Service Award.

== Personal life ==
Verveer was born in Pottsville, Pennsylvania. She is married to Philip Verveer, a Washington communications lawyer who served as Ambassador and U.S. Coordinator for International Communications and Information Policy. They have three children and two granddaughters.

== Public service ==
=== Clinton administration ===
Verveer served as Deputy Assistant to President Clinton (1993–96) and then as Assistant to President Clinton (1997–2000). (See: Executive Office of the President of the United States) As a member of the White House Senior Staff, she provided advice and implemented a wide range of substantive policies, including judicial selection and legal services, arts policies, healthcare, and women's issues. She was instrumental in the adoption of the Victims of Trafficking and Violence Protection Act of 2000 and led the effort to establish the President's Interagency Council on Women.

First, as Deputy Chief of Staff (1993–1996) and then as Chief of Staff to the First Lady (1997–2000), she served as Mrs. Clinton's chief assistant for her international activities. These included overseeing her global initiatives on women's rights as human rights, democracy-building micro-enterprise, girls' education, and other development programs. She organized the first lady's foreign trips to over 70 countries. She helped to create the US government's Vital Voices Democracy Initiative to promote women's economic and political progress. The initiative grew out of the US response to the UN's Fourth World Conference on Women, which took place in Beijing in 1995. It was in Beijing that Hillary Clinton made her historic Women's Rights Are Human Rights speech." Verveer was responsible for much of the planning for the US participation in the Beijing conference.

In her White House memoirs, Clinton notes, "A true policy wonk who loves the complexities and nuances of issues, Melanne had worked for years on Capitol Hill and in the advocacy world. I used to joke there wasn't a single person in Washington she didn't know. Not only was she a legend in the nation's capital; but so was her Rolodex. … There is no way to catalog the many projects that Melanne masterminded. … She also became a key player on the president's team, advocating for policies affecting women, human rights, legal services, and the arts."

=== Obama administration ===
In 2009, President Obama nominated Verveer as the first United States Ambassador-at-Large for Global Women's Issues at the United States Department of State. She was confirmed by the Senate in April 2009. She served as Ambassador from 2009 to 2013, working closely with Hillary Clinton to coordinate foreign policy issues and activities relating to the political, economic and social advancement of women and girls, traveling to nearly 60 countries, including Myanmar, Papua New Guinea, Afghanistan, and the Democratic Republic of Congo. She worked to fully integrate women's participation and rights into U.S. foreign policy and to mobilize concrete support for women's political and economic empowerment through public–private partnership, participation in bilateral strategic dialogues, and the agendas of multilateral organizations and policy initiatives. During Clinton's tenure, women's issues were recognized as integral to foreign policy. Several new policies were adopted, including Secretarial Policy Guidance on Gender Equality and the National Action Plan on Women, Peace and Security. Their work recognized the role of women's economic participation in multilateral organizations, including leadership on "Women & Economy in APEC. Verveer also met frequently with women who were on the front lines of the "Arab Awakening". President Obama appointed Verveer as Ambassador to the Commission on the Status of Women. She also served as the Co-Chair of the US-Afghan Women's Council.

To mark Women's History Month at the White House in 2013, President Obama recognized Verveer's achievements and noted that he was making the position of Ambassador for Global Women's Issues permanent. He issued a presidential memorandum to that effect.

Obama said, "We're also seeing an expanded opportunity for women to reach their full potential around the world. That's in large part because four years ago, a former Secretary of State Hillary Clinton, a tireless advocate for women herself, designated an Ambassador-at-Large for Global Women's Issues whose sole job it is to make sure that women and girls are a central part of every aspect of our foreign policy, that their concerns are considered at the highest level of our diplomatic decision-making. For four years, the incredible Melanne Verveer held that role. We're so grateful for her service, along with the millions of women around the world that she helped to amplify and helped to fight alongside on the causes that are so important."

=== Georgetown University ===
Verveer is the executive director at the Georgetown Institute for Women, Peace, and Security.

== Vital Voices ==
Verveer co-founded the international NGO, Vital Voices Global Partnership in 2001 to continue the work – begun by then-First Lady Hillary Clinton – to support emerging women leaders in building vibrant democracies and strong economies. Vital Voices focuses on expanding women's participation in politics and civil society, increasing women's entrepreneurship and fighting human rights abuses, particularly the trafficking of women and children. The Vital Voices Global Leadership Network connects thousands of women leaders who have participated in Vital Voices conferences and training programs around the globe. Verveer served as chair of the board and Co-CEO until early 2009.

Hillary Clinton addressed the Vital Voices annual awards gala at the Kennedy Center every year since its inception. In 2013, Clinton honored Verveer for her service to advancing women's progress.

== Awards and honors ==
=== Recognition ===
- Foremother Award from The National Center for Health Research (2017)
- US Secretary of State, Award for Distinguished Service (2013)
- Global Partnership for Afghanistan, Seeding the Future Award (2013)
- International Center for Research on Women, Champions for Change Leadership Award (2013)
- Virtue Foundation, Humanitarian Award (2013)
- Earth Day Network, Women Green Economy Leadership Award (2013)
- IREX, Founder's Day Award (2013)
- Achiana, Leadership Award (2013)
- I Live 2 Lead Trailblazer Award (2013)
- Global Fairness Award (2012)
- Nizami Ganjavi International Award (2012)
- Fast Company, 60 Influencers Who are Changing the World (2012)
- Francophone Ambassadors Award (2012)
- Newsweek, 150 Fearless Women in the World (2012)
- Enterprising Women Hall of Fame (2012)
- Futures Without Violence, Global Impact Award (2012)
- Jewish World Watch, I Witness Award (2012)
- Oxford University Said Business School, Womensphere Global Award (2011)
- Somaly Mam Foundation Award (2011)
- Newsweek, 150 Women Who Shake the World (2011)
- Emily Couric Women's Leadership Award (2011)
- Interaction Breakthrough Award (2011)
- Innocents at Risk, Woman of Courage Award (2011)
- Delivered the NYC Bar Association Justice Ginsburg Distinguished Lecture on Women and Law (2010)
- AVON Public Service Champions Award (2010)
- Boston World Affairs Council (2010)
- Christian Herter Memorial Award from the Boston World Affairs Council (2010)
- Women's Foreign Policy Group Award (2010)
- National Council for Research on Women, Making a Difference Award (2010)
- Meridian International Center, Meridian Award (2009)
- Birmingham Southern College, Women of Achievement (2008)
- President of Ukraine, Awarded the Order of Princess Olga (2008)
- Basilian Humanitarian Award (1998)
- National Council of Ukrainian Women, Public Service Award (1997)
- People for the American Way, First Amendment Award
- American Association Of University Women, Woman of Distinction Award

=== Honorary degrees ===
- Ulster University, Northern Ireland (2013)
- Franklin and Marshall (2013)
- Smith College (2013)
- Agnes Scott College (2011)

=== Board memberships ===
- Asia Foundation (Board)
- Atlantic Council (Board)
- Center for Budget and Policy Priorities (Board)
- World Bank Advisory Council on Gender and Development (Board)
- National Endowment for Democracy (Board)
- Trilateral Commission (Member)
- Council on Foreign Relations (Member)

== Publications ==
- Distracting From the Task of ‘War-Fighting?’ Good Grief," The Persistent
- "Closing the Internet Gender Gap," Huffington Post
- "Why Women Are a Foreign Policy Issue," Foreign Policy
- "Lift Up Women to Lift Up the World," CNN
- "At Davos: Investing in Women Emerges as a Business Strategy," The Daily Beast
- "Our Commitment to Afghan Women," The Huffington Post
- "Eleven Words," The Huffington Post
- "Celebrating the Power of Collaboration," Business Fight Poverty

Diplomatic posts
New office	United States Ambassador-at-Large for Global Women's Issues; 2009–2013	Succeeded by Catherine Russell
