= 1994 United States Senate election in Maine =

- November 8, 1994
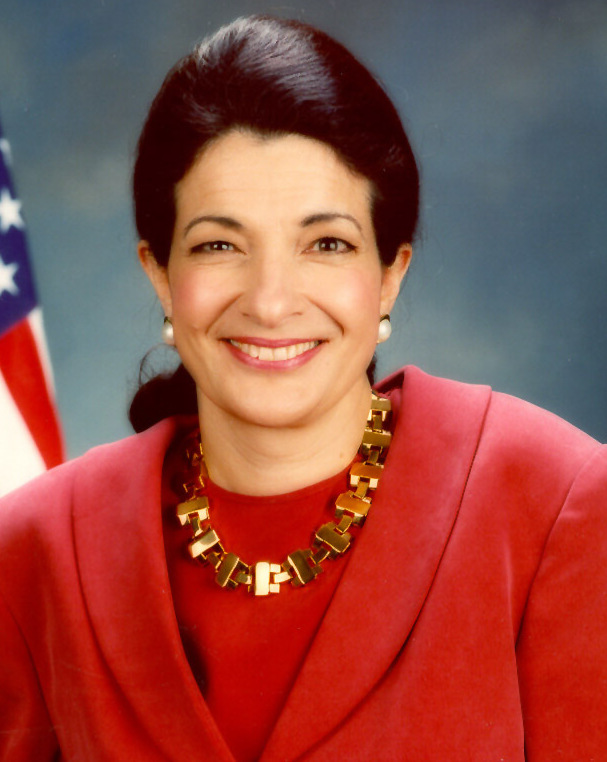

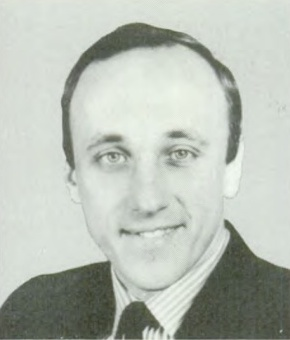
| Nominee | Olympia Snowe | Tom Andrews |
| Party | Republican | Democratic |
| Popular vote | 308,244 | 186,042 |
| Percentage | 60.24% | 36.36% |
- Snowe: 40–50% 50–60% 60–70% 70–80% 80–90% >90% Andrews: 40–50% 50–60% 70–80%
U.S. senator before election
George J. Mitchell
Democratic
Elected U.S. Senator
Olympia Snowe
Republican

The 1994 United States Senate election in Maine was held November 8, 1994. Incumbent Democratic U.S. Senator and Senate Majority Leader George J. Mitchell decided to retire, instead of seeking a third full term. Congressman Tom Andrews won the Democratic primary unopposed, while Congresswoman Olympia Snowe won the Republican primary unopposed.

Snowe was not challenging Mitchell for his Senate seat: she ran for the seat when it became open upon his retirement announcement on March 3rd, 1994. In the general election, Snowe defeated Andrews in a rout to win her first of three terms in the United States Senate, a stark contrast to retiring Senator Mitchell's landslide win six years prior. Republicans won this seat for the first time since 1952.

Following Mitchell's retirement, no Maine Democrat (Note: Angus King, who was elected in 2012 and re-elected in 2018 and 2024, is an independent who caucuses with the Democrats, but is not officially a member of the party.) would win a Senate race again until Troy Jackson's victory in the 2026 election.

== Democratic primary ==
=== Candidates ===
- Tom Andrews, U.S. Representative from Maine's 1st congressional district

=== Results ===
Democratic primary results
| Party | Candidate | Votes | % |
|---|---|---|---|
| Democratic | Tom Andrews | 82,339 | 99.83 |
| Democratic | Write-ins | 140 | 0.17 |
| Total votes | | 82,479 | 100.00 |

== Republican primary ==
=== Candidates ===
- Olympia Snowe, U.S. Representative from Maine's 2nd congressional district and former First Lady of Maine

=== Results ===
Republican primary results
| Party | Candidate | Votes | % |
|---|---|---|---|
| Republican | Olympia Snowe | 79,953 | 99.88 |
| Republican | Write-ins | 93 | 0.12 |
| Total votes | | 80,046 | 100.00 |

== General election ==
=== Candidates ===
- Tom Andrews, U.S. Representative from Portland (Democratic)
- Olympia Snowe, U.S. Representative from Auburn and First Lady of Maine (Republican)
- Plato Truman (Independent)

=== Polling ===
| Source | Date | Snowe (R) | Andrews (D) |
|---|---|---|---|
| Portland Press Herald | October 30, 1994 | 50% | 31% |
| Portland Press Herald | October 31, 1994 | 53% | 29% |

=== Results ===
United States Senate election in Maine, 1994
| Party | Candidate | Votes | % | ±% |
|---|---|---|---|---|
| Republican | Olympia Snowe | 308,244 | 60.24% | +41.53% |
| Democratic | Tom Andrews | 186,042 | 36.36% | −44.94% |
| Independent | Plato Truman | 17,205 | 3.36% | |
| Write-ins | | 242 | 0.05% | |
| Majority | | 122,202 | 23.88% | −38.70% |
| Turnout | | 511,733 | | |
| Republican gain from Democratic | | Swing | | |

==== Results by county ====
| County | Olympia Snowe Republican | | Tom Andrews Democratic | | All others | | Margin | | Total votes cast |
| County | # | % | # | % | # | % | # | % | Total votes cast |
|---|---|---|---|---|---|---|---|---|---|
| Androscoggin | 22,426 | 55.5% | 16,258 | 40.2% | 1,754 | 4.3% | 6,168 | 15.3% | 40,438 |
| Aroostook | 20,995 | 71.8% | 7,118 | 24.4% | 1,119 | 3.8% | 13,877 | 47.4% | 29,232 |
| Cumberland | 59,711 | 54.8% | 46,812 | 43.0% | 2,424 | 2.2% | 12,899 | 11.8% | 108,947 |
| Franklin | 7,362 | 59.3% | 4,570 | 36.8% | 483 | 3.9% | 2,792 | 16.5% | 12,415 |
| Hancock | 14,691 | 65.8% | 6,877 | 30.8% | 754 | 3.4% | 7,814 | 35.0% | 22,322 |
| Kennebec | 28,096 | 57.2% | 19,216 | 39.1% | 1,813 | 3.7% | 8,880 | 18.1% | 49,125 |
| Knox | 10,121 | 62.9% | 5,482 | 34.1% | 483 | 3.0% | 4,639 | 28.8% | 16,086 |
| Lincoln | 10,120 | 65.0% | 4,956 | 31.9% | 483 | 3.2% | 5,164 | 33.1% | 15,559 |
| Oxford | 12,727 | 58.5% | 8,081 | 37.1% | 1,747 | 4.4% | 4,646 | 21.4% | 21,772 |
| Penobscot | 38,690 | 65.3% | 18,585 | 31.4% | 1,977 | 3.4% | 20,105 | 33.9% | 59,252 |
| Piscataquis | 5,313 | 69.9% | 2,037 | 26.8% | 254 | 3.3% | 3,276 | 43.1% | 7,604 |
| Sagadahoc | 8,677 | 60.6% | 5,120 | 35.7% | 529 | 3.7% | 3,557 | 24.9% | 14,326 |
| Somerset | 11,533 | 60.6% | 6,655 | 35.0% | 837 | 4.4% | 4,878 | 25.6% | 19,025 |
| Waldo | 9,130 | 63.8% | 4,661 | 32.6% | 518 | 3.6% | 4,469 | 31.2% | 14,309 |
| Washington | 8,935 | 67.9% | 3,765 | 28.6% | 459 | 3.5% | 5,170 | 39.3% | 13,159 |
| York | 39,717 | 58.3% | 25,849 | 37.9% | 2,596 | 3.8% | 13,868 | 20.4% | 68,162 |
| Totals | 308,244 | 60.2% | 186,042 | 36.4% | 17,447 | 3.4% | 122,202 | 23.8% | 511,733 |

Counties that flipped from Democratic to Republican

- All 16

== See also ==
- 1994 United States Senate elections
