= United Nations Special Rapporteur on Human Rights in Myanmar =

United Nations Special Rapporteur

United Nations Special Rapporteur on the situation of Human Rights in Myanmar
- Emblem of the United Nations
- Incumbent; Kelly Currie since April 2026
- Inaugural holder: Yozo Yokota
- Formation: 1992
- Website: www.ohchr.org/en/special-procedures/sr-myanmar

The United Nations Special Rapporteur on the situation of Human Rights in Myanmar is a United Nations Special Rapporteur whose mandate is to monitor and investigate human rights violations in Myanmar. The incumbent Special Rapporteur is Kelley Currie, who was appointed to the role in April 2026, succeeding Thomas Andrews.

The office was established in March 1992 by the Office of the United Nations High Commissioner for Human Rights, in the aftermath of the 1990 Myanmar general election, and continued deterioration in the country's human rights situation under the rule of the military junta, the State Law and Order Restoration Council.

== Appointees ==
- Kelley Currie (2026-present)
- Tom Andrews (2020–2026)
- Yanghee Lee (2014-2020)
- Tomás Ojea Quintana (2008-2014)
- Paulo Sérgio Pinherio (2000-2008)
- Rajsoomer Lallah (1996-2000)
- Yozo Yokota (1992-1996)

== See also ==
- Human rights in Myanmar
