= Duty: Memoirs of a Secretary at War =

2014 book by Robert Gates

- Author: Robert M. Gates
- Language: English
- Subject: Presidency of George W. Bush, Presidency of Barack Obama, Afghan war, Iraq War
- Genre: Non-fiction
- Publisher: Alfred A. Knopf
- Publication date: January 2014
- Publication place: United States
- Media type: Print
- Pages: 618
- ISBN: 978-0307959478
- OCLC: 857234147
- Dewey Decimal: 355.6092 B
- LC Class: E897.4.G37 A3 2014

Duty: Memoirs of a Secretary at War is a nonfiction book written by Robert M. Gates, a former U.S. secretary of defense. It was published in January 2014 by Alfred A. Knopf. The book recounts Gates's service in the George W. Bush administration (2006–2009) and the Obama administration (2009–2011), including his experiences managing the Afghan and Iraq wars.

Narrated in first person point of view, the book describes Secretary Gates's personal interactions with the U.S. Congress, the Pentagon's bureaucracy, and the White House staff under President Obama. This memoir is also the first to recount the Obama administration's policy discussions and debates during Cabinet meetings.

== Gates's commentary ==
As expressed in the book, disagreements with Obama's White House staff and the other aforementioned organizations elicit strong emotions and criticisms from Gates. For example, President Obama's White House staff is seen as an imperious entity, who, as a group, are seen as "micromanagers" that engaged in "operational meddling." Additionally, Vice President Joe Biden's performance is criticized. Former Secretary of State Hillary Clinton's is held in high regard professionally and personally. She in fact was usually in agreement with Gates on policy issues.

President Obama is judged favorably at first, and not so favorably by 2011. However, towards the end of the book, Mr. Gates states that Mr. Obama's decision to send a United States Navy SEALs team after Osama bin Laden in Pakistan was "one of the most courageous decisions I had ever witnessed in the White House". He also states that Obama's policy decisions pertaining to the "overall Afghan strategy" were correct. He also criticizes the George W. Bush administration's Afghan war, Iraq War, and Guantanamo Bay policies.

== Gates's background ==
Gates came to the Obama administration as a "respected professional and veteran of decades at the center of American foreign policy." As a Republican, he also represented President Obama's policy of bipartisanism. Over time, however, his relationship with Obama and his staff devolved. Protracted policy disagreements with Vice President Joe Biden, Tom Donilon (national security advisor), and U.S. Army Lieutenant General Douglas E. Lute (Afghan policy chief) are additionally recounted.
