= Sarah E. Mendelson =

American diplomat

Sarah Mendelson

United States Ambassador to the United Nations Economic and Social Council
- In office October 9, 2015 – August 2017
- President: Barack Obama
- Preceded by: Richard Erdman (Acting)
- Succeeded by: Kelley Eckels Currie

Personal details
- Born: April 15, 1962 (age 64) Philadelphia, Pennsylvania, U.S.
- Education: Yale University; Columbia University

Sarah E. Mendelson is an American diplomat who served as United States Ambassador to the United Nations Economic and Social Council. Mendelson was confirmed by the Senate on October 8, 2015, and sworn into her post on October 15, 2015. In 2017, Mendelson was named Distinguished Service Professor and head of Carnegie Mellon University Heinz College's program in Washington, D.C.

== Early life and education ==
Mendelson is a first-generation American. She grew up in the Philadelphia, Pennsylvania, area, the daughter of Dr. Myer Mendelson, who was born in Lithuania, and Margaret Jean Algie Mendelson, his Canadian wife. After graduating from Friends' Central School, Mendelson attended Yale University, where she earned a B.A. in history in 1984. She was awarded her Ph.D. in political science from Columbia University in 1993. Mendelson also earned a certificate from the Harriman Institute, the first academic center in the United States devoted to the interdisciplinary study of Russia and the Soviet Union. Her research has been funded by the United States Department of State, the John D. and Catherine T. MacArthur Foundation, the National Council for Eurasian and East European Research, and the Social Science Research Council.

== Career ==
Mendelson's studies and professional work have been focused on democracy and human rights internationally. Her research covers topics on civil society, historical memory, public opinion and politics in Russia, and issues surrounding Human trafficking.

After completing her graduate studies, she served in Moscow as a program officer with the National Democratic Institute for International Affairs from 1994 to 1995, working with political activists. From 1995 to 1998, she was an assistant professor at the University at Albany, SUNY and from 1997 to 1998, she was a resident associate at the Carnegie Endowment for International Peace. She has also been a fellow at Stanford University's Center for International Security and Cooperation and Princeton University's Princeton Institute for International and Regional Studies. From 1999 to 2001, she was an assistant professor of international politics at the Fletcher School of Law and Diplomacy at Tufts University.

From 2001 to 2010 she served as senior adviser and first director of the Human Rights Initiative at the Center for Strategic and International Studies, an influential American think tank based in Washington, D.C. The center conducts policy studies and strategic analyses of political, economic and security issues throughout the world, with a specific focus on issues concerning international relations, trade, technology, finance, energy and geostrategy.

From May 2010 to May 2014, Mendelson served as deputy assistant administrator, responsible for Democracy, Human Rights and Governance in the Bureau for Democracy, Conflict, and Humanitarian Assistance at the United States Agency for International Development (USAID). She was also the agency lead on addressing the problem of human trafficking. She has served as an expert speaker on international relations, testified before Congress and appeared on National Public Radio, the BBC World Service, and CNN.

When President Obama tapped her to become ambassador, she was the Senior Adviser and Director of the Human Rights Initiative at the Center for Strategic and International Studies (CSIS) in Washington, D.C., a position she had held since 2014.

In 2018, Mendelson was named Distinguished Service Professor and head of Carnegie Mellon University Heinz College's program in Washington, D.C.

Goal 16: Peace Justice and Strong Institutions

=== Research contribution to the United Nations Sustainable Development Goals ===
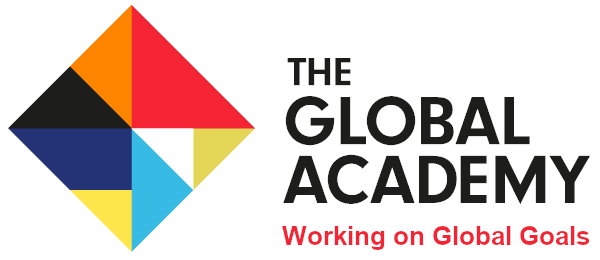
Researcher Page at the Global Academy

As a researcher, Mendelson is contributing to the Sustainable Development Goals (SDGs). Her work with Carnegie Mellon's Heinz College is contributing significantly to Goal 16; Peace Justice and Strong Institutions, and Goal 4; Quality Education. Mendelson also serves as a co-chair of CMU's Sustainability Initiative.

Target 16.3: Promote the rule of law and ensure equal access to justice Target 4.7: Education for sustainable development and global citizenship

== Publications ==
Mendelson is the author and co-author of over 70 publications.

In addition to her scholarly publications, Mendelson has published in the Washington Post, the Globe and Mail (Canada), Foreign Affairs, and Survival. She is the author of Changing Course: Ideas, Politics and the Soviet Withdrawal from Afghanistan (Princeton University Press, 1998) and co-editor of The Power and Limits of NGOs: Transnational Networks and Post-Communist Societies (Columbia University Press, 2002).

Diplomatic posts
Preceded by Richard Erdman; Acting	United States Ambassador to the United Nations Economic and Social Council; 2015–2017	Succeeded by Kelley Eckels Currie
