= Kelley Eckels Currie =

American lawyer and government official

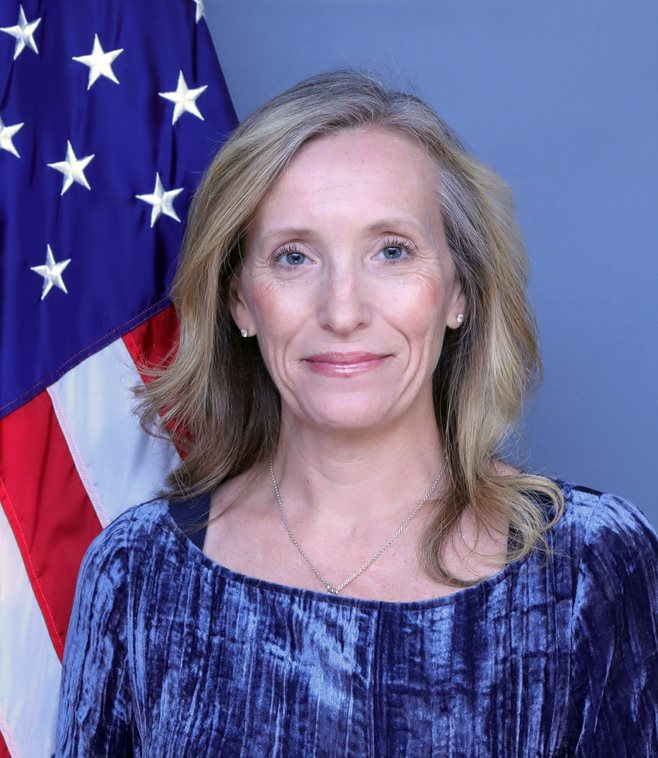

United Nations Special Rapporteur on Human Rights in Myanmar
- Incumbent
- Assumed office April 2026
- Preceded by: Tom Andrews

3rd United States Ambassador-at-Large for Global Women's Issues
- In office January 14, 2020 – January 20, 2021
- President: Donald Trump
- Preceded by: Catherine M. Russell
- Succeeded by: Geeta Rao Gupta

Acting United States Deputy Ambassador to the United Nations
- In office February 21, 2018 – June 8, 2018
- President: Donald Trump
- Leader: Nikki Haley
- Preceded by: Michele J. Sison
- Succeeded by: Jonathan Cohen

United States Representative to the United Nations Economic and Social Council
- In office August 2017 – February 18, 2019
- President: Donald Trump
- Preceded by: Sarah E. Mendelson
- Succeeded by: Courtney R. Nemroff (acting)

Personal details
- Party: Republican
- Spouse: Peter Currie
- Children: 2
- Education: University of Georgia; Georgetown Law

Kelley Eckels Currie (née Eckels) is an American human rights lawyer and former government official who served as the ambassador-at-large for global women's issues from 2020 to 2021. She previously served as the U.S. representative to the United Nations Economic and Social Council and as the acting deputy representative of the U.S. to the U.N., after Michele Sison's departure. Before assuming her role as Ambassador-at-Large for Global Women's Issues, she was a senior fellow at the Project 2049 Institute, a think tank focused on security issues and public policy in Central Asia and the Asia-Pacific region. She previously held senior public policy positions with the United States Department of State and several international and nongovernmental human rights and humanitarian organizations. Currie also served as foreign operations appropriations associate and staff director of the Congressional Human Rights Caucus for Representative John Porter.

In March 2019, it was announced that President Donald Trump would nominate Currie as the United States ambassador-at-large for global women's issues and representative of the United States on the United Nations Commission on the Status of Women. This nomination was submitted in June 2019 and approved by voice vote of the U.S. Senate on December 19, 2019. She joined the office in January 2020.

== Later career ==
=== Myanmar ===
In 2026, Currie was appointed as the United Nations Special Rapporteur on Human Rights in Myanmar by the United Nations Human Rights Council.
