= Catherine M. Russell =

American government and UN official (born 1961)

Cathy Russell
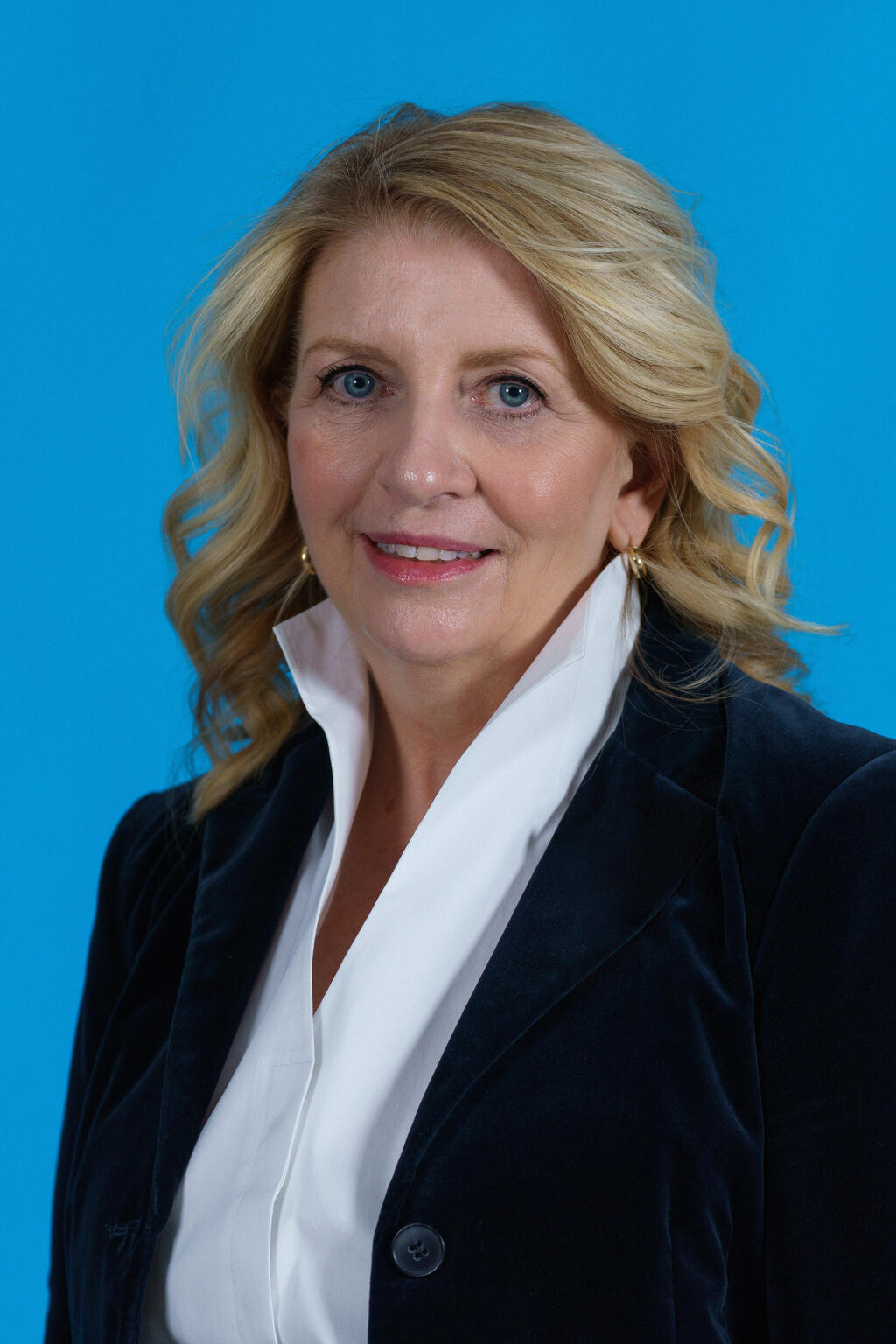
- Official portrait, 2022

Executive Director of UNICEF
- Incumbent
- Assumed office February 1, 2022
- Secretary General: António Guterres
- Preceded by: Henrietta H. Fore

Director of the White House Presidential Personnel Office
- In office January 20, 2021 – January 31, 2022
- President: Joe Biden
- Preceded by: John McEntee
- Succeeded by: Gautam Raghavan

2nd United States Ambassador-at-Large for Global Women's Issues
- In office August 26, 2013 – January 20, 2017
- President: Barack Obama
- Preceded by: Melanne Verveer
- Succeeded by: Kelley Eckels Currie

Chief of Staff to the Second Lady of the United States
- In office January 20, 2009 – August 26, 2013
- Vice President: Joe Biden
- Preceded by: ???
- Succeeded by: Sheila Nix

Personal details
- Born: March 4, 1961 (age 65) Jersey City, New Jersey, U.S.
- Spouse: Thomas E. Donilon (m. 1991)
- Children: 2
- Relatives: Mike Donilon (brother-in law)
- Education: Boston College (BA); George Washington University (JD)
- Catherine Russell's voice Catherine Russell speaks on child marriage Recorded September 14, 2016

Catherine Mary Russell (born March 4, 1961) is an American attorney and political adviser who is the executive director of UNICEF as of 2022. Russell was director of the White House Presidential Personnel Office, United States Ambassador-at-Large for Global Women's Issues, and chief of staff to then-second lady of the United States Jill Biden.

== Early life and education ==
Russell was born in Jersey City, New Jersey, to Paul Russell and Ann (née McCaffery) Russell. She grew up in Reading, Pennsylvania, with four siblings. Russell graduated from Boston College, magna cum laude, with a degree in philosophy, and received her Juris Doctor from George Washington University.

== Career ==
After law school, Russell began working in Democratic politics. In 1984, Russell worked on Walter Mondale’s presidential campaign, on which she met her husband, Tom Donilon. In 1987, Russell worked on Joe Biden’s presidential campaign.

On Capitol Hill, Russell was Counsel and then Senior Counsel to the Senate Judiciary Committee's Technology Subcommittee, chaired by Senator Patrick Leahy. She also was Staff Director to Judiciary Committee when it was chaired by then-Senator Biden. In that role, Russell worked on the successful passage of the Violence Against Women Act and the Supreme Court nominations of Justices Ruth Bader Ginsburg and Stephen Breyer. Russell later was Associate Deputy Attorney General under Janet Reno.

In 2007, Russell returned to work part-time for then-Senator Biden who was the Chair of the Foreign Relations Committee. She drafted the International Violence Against Women Act of 2007, modeled on the legislation Biden had introduced in 1994.

=== Obama administration ===
==== Office of the Vice President ====
Russell is a longtime adviser to both Vice President Biden and his wife Jill Biden. During the 2008 presidential campaign, Russell was tapped to be chief of staff to then-second lady-elect Jill Biden—a position she held from 2009 to 2013.

In that role, Russell managed the second lady's staff and worked on her initiatives to increase access to community college education and to support military families, through the Joining Forces program. Russell also oversaw a process to develop the government's first strategy on tackling gender-based violence globally.

==== Ambassador-at-Large for Global Women's Issues ====
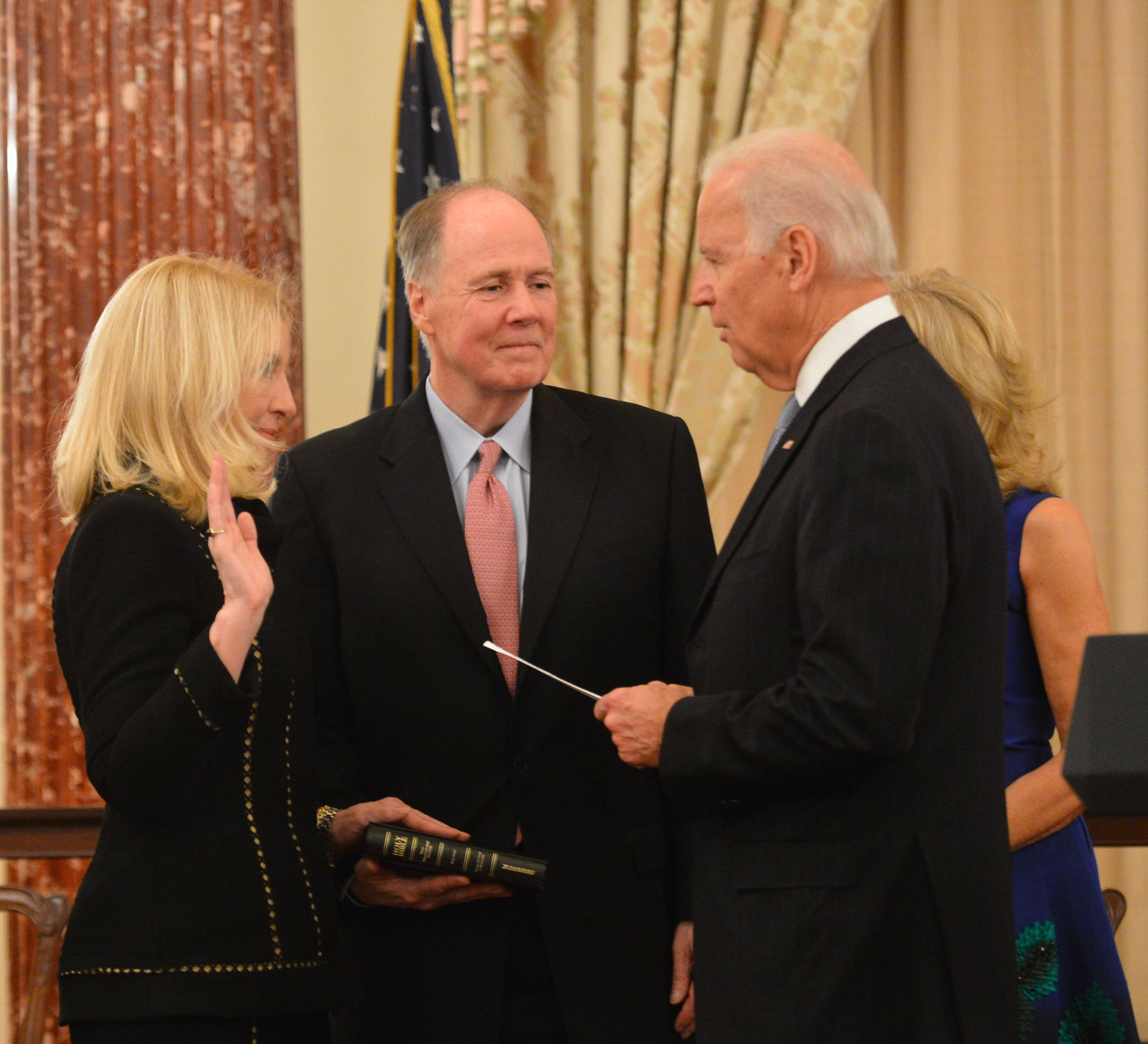
Russell sworn in by Vice President Joe Biden as the U.S. Ambassador-at-Large for Global Women’s Issues at the U.S. Department of State in Washington, D.C. on January 17, 2014.

President Obama created the position in 2009, and made it a permanent ambassador-level position in 2013.

Senator Patrick Leahy, for whom Russell had worked as a staffer, spoke at her confirmation hearing and recalled her "brilliant mind" and "uncanny ability … to take the most complex issues, get them down to where even a Senator like myself and others could understand it."

Russell was confirmed unanimously by the Senate on August 1, 2013. Vice President Biden swore her into office on January 17, 2014.

In her nomination hearing, Russell said that, if confirmed, she would focus her work on six areas: first, ensuring that the State Department adopted gender issues into "all aspects of diplomacy"; second, promoting women's economic participation; third, implementing the National Action Plan on Women, Peace, and Security; fourth, combatting gender-based violence; fifth, expanding political participation; and sixth, investing in women and girls' health and education.

As part of that effort, Russell designed the U.S. Global Strategy to Empower Girls, released in March 2014. It enlisted the State Department, USAID, Peace Corps, and Millennium Challenge Corporation to pursue the same goal: "to ensure adolescent girls are educated, healthy, socially and economically empowered, and free from violence and discrimination." This marked the first time a country had produced an adolescent girls' strategy. Under Russell's leadership, the Office of Global Women's Issues worked with Secretary Kerry to secure $7 million for adolescent girls' empowerment programming in Afghanistan in March 2016. Her office also worked with USAID and UNICEF to produce a three-year, $5 million program to reduce gender-based violence in schools.

One of Russell's priorities was ending child marriage globally, which she outlined to the Senate in a 2016 testimony.

As Ambassador, Russell traveled to dozens of countries during her time as Ambassador, including Afghanistan in November 13 and the Democratic Republic of the Congo in 2014. Russell's first trip was to Bali for the Asia-Pacific Economic Cooperation summit.

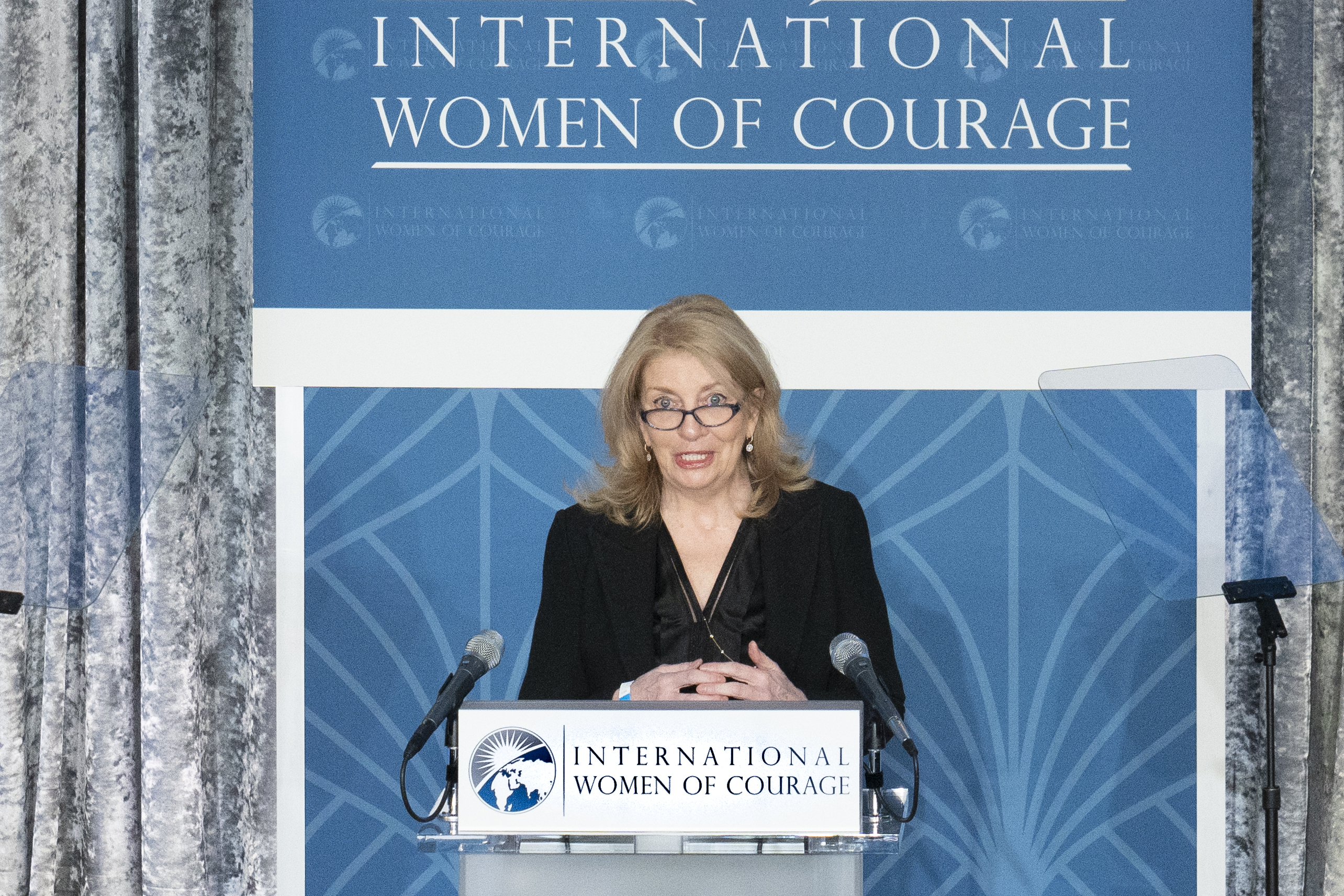
Russell delivers remarks at the 2021 International Women of Courage Awards virtual ceremony from the U.S. Department of State in Washington, D.C. on March 8, 2021.

=== Biden administration ===
On September 5, 2020, Russell was announced to be a member of the advisory council of the Biden-Harris Transition Team, which was planning the presidential transition of Joe Biden. On November 20, 2020, it was announced that Russell would serve as the director of the White House Presidential Personnel Office when Biden assumed office.

=== UNICEF Director ===
On 10 December 2021, United Nations Secretary‑General António Guterres announced that Russell had been appointed executive director of the United Nations Children's Fund (UNICEF).

== Personal life ==
Since 1991, Russell has been married to Thomas E. Donilon, who was the National Security Advisor under President Obama, and is chairman of BlackRock Investment . Her brother-in-law is Mike Donilon, a lawyer and political consultant who is chief advisor to President Joe Biden.

Diplomatic posts
Preceded by Melanne Verveer	United States Ambassador-at-Large for Global Women's Issues; 2013–2017	Succeeded by Kelley Eckels Currie
Preceded by Henrietta H. Fore	Executive Director of UNICEF; 2022–present	Incumbent
