= Geeta Rao Gupta =

Indian academic (born 1956)

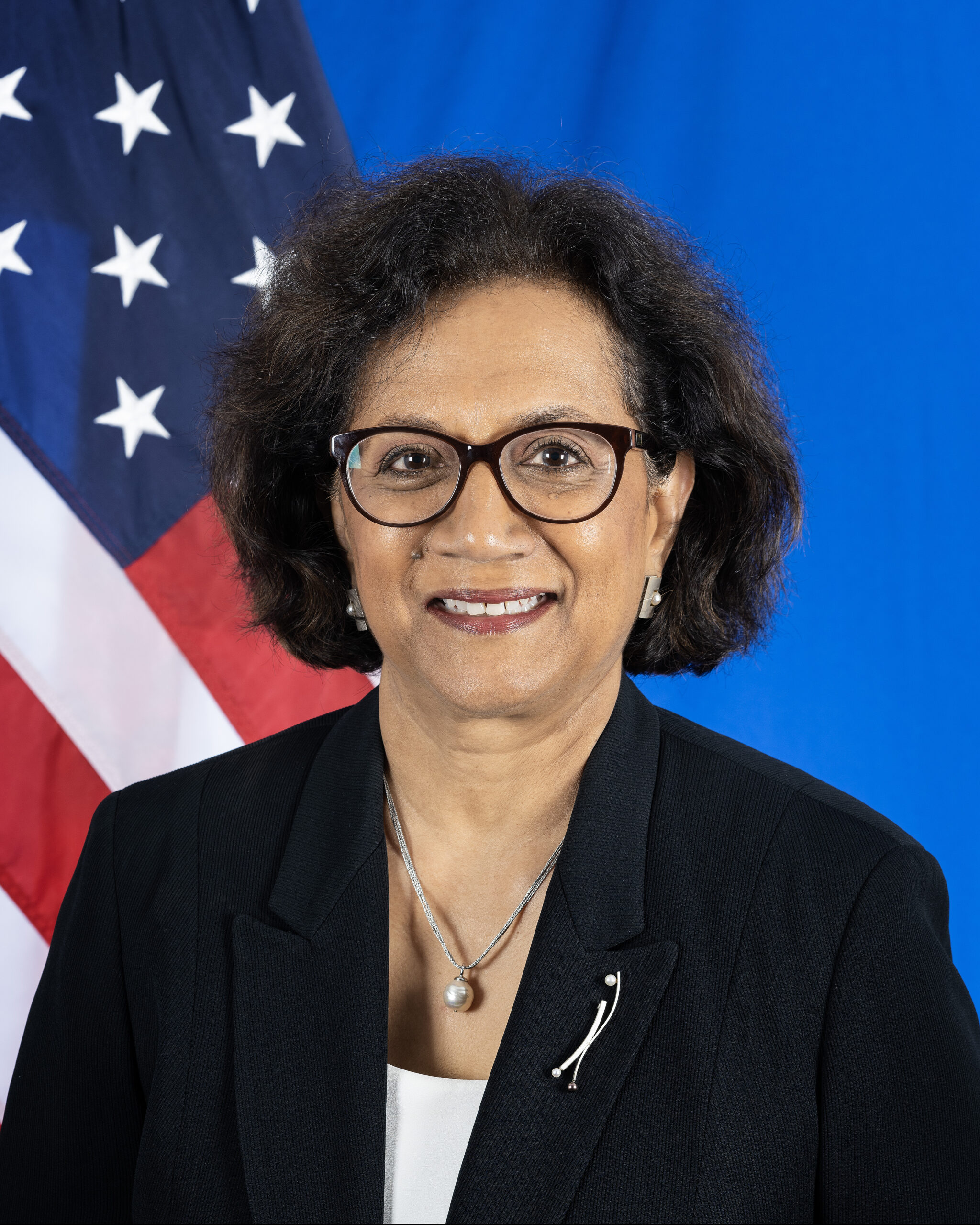
- Official portrait, 2023

4th United States Ambassador-at-Large for Global Women's Issues
- In office May 18, 2023 – January 20, 2025
- President: Joe Biden
- Preceded by: Kelley Eckels Currie
- Succeeded by: Position Abolished

Personal details
- Born: Mumbai, India
- Education: University of Delhi (BA, MPhil); Bangalore University (PhD)

Geeta Rao Gupta (born 1956 in Mumbai, India) is a leader on gender, women's issues, and HIV/AIDS who had served as United States Ambassador-at-Large for Global Women's Issues. She previously served as executive director of the 3D Program for Girls and Women and senior fellow at the United Nations Foundation since 2017. She is frequently consulted on issues related to AIDS prevention and women's vulnerability to HIV and is an advocate for women's economic and social empowerment to fight disease, poverty and hunger.

Rao Gupta is former president of the International Center for Research on Women (ICRW). She began working with ICRW in 1988 as a consultant, researcher, and officer, and headed the private, non-profit organization based in Washington, D.C., from 1997 through April 2010. She stepped down to join the Bill & Melinda Gates Foundation as a senior fellow from 2010 to 2011. Appointed by United Nations Secretary-General Ban Ki-moon, she served as deputy executive director for UNICEF and the vice chair of the board for the GAVI Alliance from 2011 to 2016.

== Early life and education ==
Rao Gupta grew up in Mumbai and Delhi, India, and received her education from the University of Delhi and Bangalore University.

Rao Gupta received a Ph.D. in social psychology from Bangalore University, an M.Phil. in organizational behavior from the University of Delhi, and a master's in clinical of psychology and a B.A. in psychology from the University of Delhi.

== Career ==
While working toward her advanced degrees in social psychology, Rao Gupta worked as a counselor at a drop-in center in New Delhi and lectured in the psychology departments of several universities. At the Tata Institute of Social Sciences, Rao Gupta worked with a team to develop the first women's studies curriculum for graduate students in India.

In the mid-1980s, Rao Gupta moved to the United States and began working at the International Center for Research on Women (ICRW) in 1988. She has held a number of positions with ICRW, including consultant, researcher and vice-president. In the 1990s, Rao Gupta headed a ground-breaking, 15-country research program that identified the social and economic roots of women's vulnerability to HIV infection. Rao Gupta became president of ICRW in 1996.

Rao Gupta currently serves as co-convener of the Social Drivers Working Group of aids2031, an international initiative commissioned by UNAIDS to chart a course for a global response to AIDS over the next twenty-five years. She served as co-chair of the U.N. Secretary-General's High-Level Panel on Youth Employment and from 2002 to 2005, she co-chaired the U.N. Millennium Project's Task Force on Promoting Gender Equality and Empowering Women.

In 2016, World Health Organization Director General Margaret Chan appointed Rao Gupta as member of the Independent Oversight and Advisory Committee for the WHO Health Emergencies Programme. From 2016 until 2017, she co-chaired (alongside Katherine Sierra) the World Bank's Global Gender-Based Violence (GGBV) Task Force; the group was launched by World Bank Group President Jim Yong Kim to strengthen the institution's response through its projects to issues involving sexual exploitation and abuse. Since 2019, she has been a member of the Lancet–SIGHT Commission on Peaceful Societies Through Health and Gender Equality, chaired by Tarja Halonen. She is also part of the Independent Oversight and Advisory Committee for the WHO Health Emergencies Programme.

Rao Gupta is often sought by the development community and media, and has been quoted by the Washington Post, The New York Times and USA Today, as well as other national and international news sources. Her expertise is in gender mainstreaming, women's health, HIV and AIDS, women's economic empowerment, private sector roles in development, strategies to empower women and advance gender equality, and women and poverty.

=== Ambassador at-large for global women's issues ===
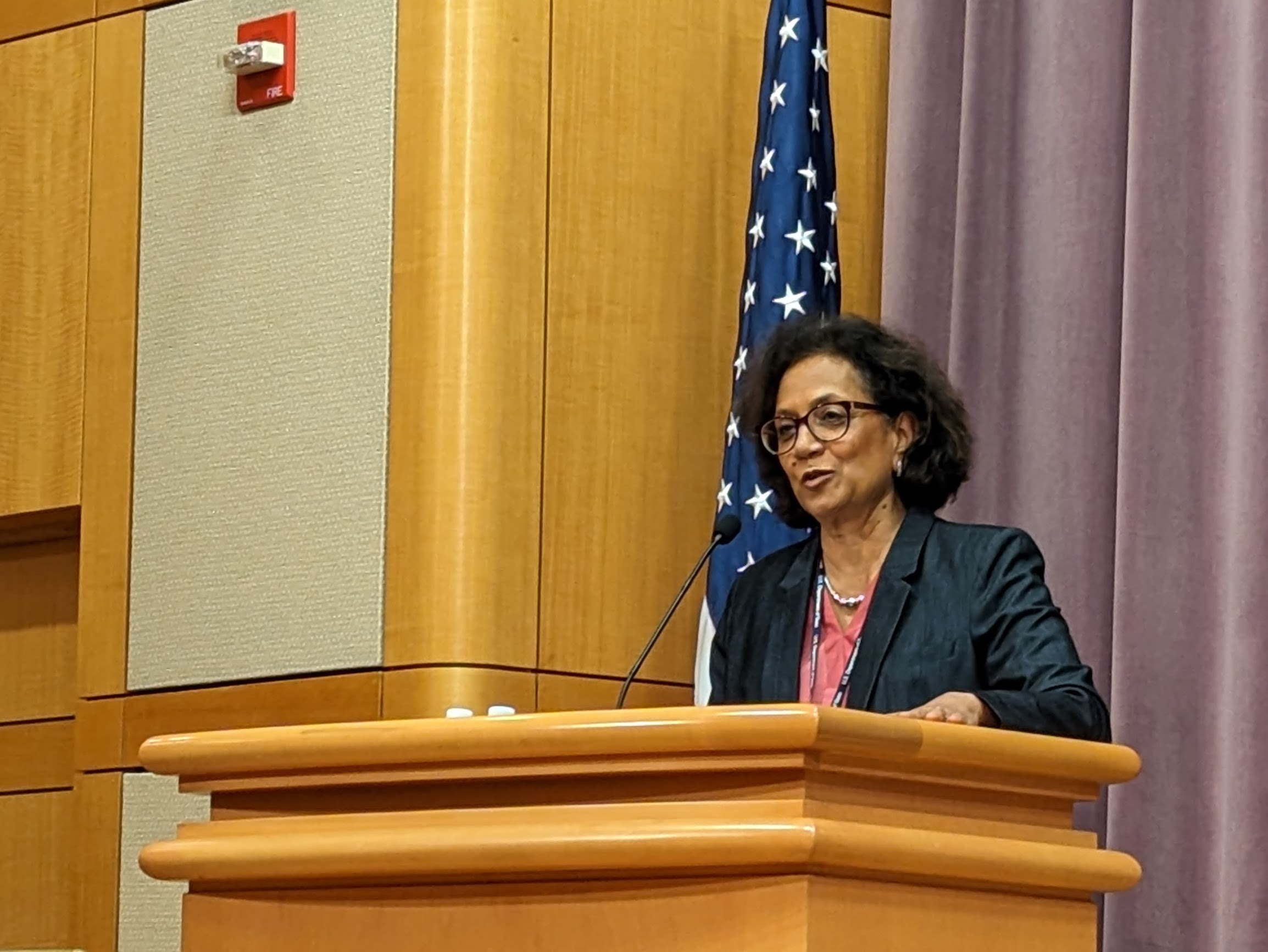
Gupta delivering remarks at a panel on women in global media in 2023

On November 12, 2021, President Joe Biden nominated Gupta to be the United States Ambassador-at-Large for Global Women's Issues. The United States Senate did not act on the nomination for the remainder of the year and was returned to President Biden on January 3, 2022.

President Biden renominated Gupta the next day. Hearings on her nomination were held before the Senate Foreign Relations Committee on June 16, 2022. The committee deadlocked on her nomination on July 19, 2022 by a party-line vote; and her nomination was returned to the President by the end of the 117th Congress.

Gupta was renominated by President Biden in the 118th Congress, and her nomination was advanced by the United States Senate Committee on Foreign Relations on March 8, 2023. On May 4, 2022, the Senate invoked cloture on Gupta’s nomination by a 50–44 vote. On May 10, 2023, her nomination was confirmed by a 51–47 vote. She began service on May 18, 2023.

== Other activities ==
=== International organizations ===
- UNAIDS, Member of the Advisory Group (since 2020)
- Global Partnership for Education (GPE), Interim Chair of the Board (2013)

=== Non-profit organizations ===
- WomenLift Health, Member of the Global Advisory Board
- Global Health Corps, Member of the Board of Advisors (since 2008)
- International AIDS Vaccine Initiative (IAVI), former Member of the Board
- InterAction, former Member of the Board
- Merck for Mothers, Member of the Advisory Board
- Moriah Fund, former Member of the Board
- Nike Foundation, former Member of the Board

== Awards and recognition ==
- Women Who Mean Business Award, Washington Business Journal, 2007
- Anne Roe Award, Harvard Graduate School of Education
- Legacy Award, Working Mother Media, 2006

== Publications ==
- "Gender and HIV: Reflecting Back, Moving Forward" In HIV/AIDS: Global Frontiers in Prevention/Intervention.
- Gender Mainstreaming: Making it Happen.
- "Structural approaches to HIV prevention"
- "Taking Action: Achieving Gender Equality and Empowering Women"
- "Value Added Women and U.S. Foreign Assistance for the 21st Century"

== Speeches and statements ==
- "Closing the Gender Gap: Where Have We Been? Where Are We Going?" 9th International Congress on AIDS and Asia in the Pacific, 11 August 2009
- "Remarks to the House Hunger Caucus and Congressional Global Health Caucus Congressional Briefing" House Hunger Caucus and Congressional Global Health Caucus, Congressional Briefing, 31 July 2007
- "Unlocking the Power of Women: Is Education the Key?" Harvard Graduate School of Education, 25 October 2006
- "Remarks from the Informal Interactive Hearings of the U.N. General Assembly" Statement at the Informal Interactive Hearings of the United Nations General Assembly, 23 June 2005
- "Statement by Geeta Rao Gupta at the United Nations General Assembly Special Session on HIV/AIDS" United Nations General Assembly 26th Special Session on HIV/AIDS, New York, 25–27 June 2001
- "Gender, Sexuality, and HIV/AIDS: The What, the Why, and the How" XIIIth International AIDS Conference, Durban, South Africa, 12 July 2000
