= Mike Donilon =

American government officer (born 1958)

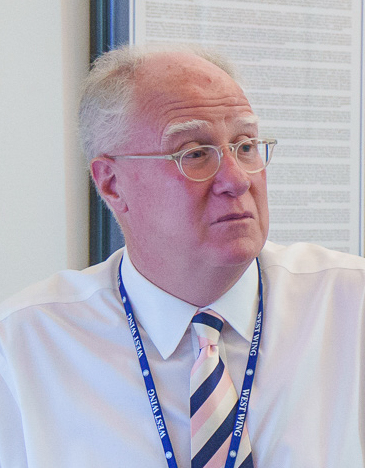
- Donilon in 2022

Senior Advisor to the President
- In office January 20, 2021 – January 23, 2024
- President: Joe Biden
- Preceded by: Jared Kushner; Stephen Miller; Ivanka Trump
- Succeeded by: Anita Dunn; Gene Sperling; John Podesta; Annie Tomasini

Personal details
- Born: December 25, 1958 (age 67)
- Party: Democratic
- Relatives: Tom Donilon (brother); Cathy Russell (sister-in-law)
- Education: Georgetown University (BA, JD)

Michael C. Donilon (born December 25, 1958) is an American attorney and campaign consultant who is a longtime advisor to Joe Biden, the 46th President of the United States. He was the chief strategist of Biden's 2020 presidential campaign and served in the same capacity in the 2024 presidential campaign before Biden dropped out of the race on July 21, 2024. He was a senior advisor to Biden during the first three years of his presidency. Prior, Donilon was working as a partner at AKPD Message and Media. Between 2009 and 2013, he served as Counselor to Vice President Biden in the Obama administration. Before his White House appointment, Donilon worked with the vice-presidential candidate to help him prepare for the debates and as a traveling advisor.

Donilon has been an advisor and consultant to Biden since 1981. He has been described as Biden's "conscience, alter ego and shared brain" by the Washington Post. In the aftermath of the 2024 election, Donilon was criticized for shielding Biden from accurate information about his campaign prospects.

== Early life and education ==
Donilon is a graduate of La Salle Academy in Providence, Rhode Island. He earned a Bachelor of Arts and Juris Doctor from Georgetown University.

== Career ==
Donilon has advised candidates and worked on their campaigns in numerous important races, including Douglas Wilder's historic campaign and election as Governor of Virginia (1989), Harris Wofford's upset victory over Dick Thornburgh to become Senator for the state of Pennsylvania, and Bill Clinton's successful run for the White House in 1992.

Donilon has also worked on campaigns for Governor Jon Corzine (D-New Jersey), Senator Bill Nelson (D-Florida), Senator Jack Reed (D-Rhode Island), Senator Sheldon Whitehouse (D-Rhode Island), Senator Joe Lieberman (I-Connecticut), Representative Dick Gephardt (D-Missouri), Senator Chris Dodd (D-Connecticut), Senator John Edwards (D-North Carolina), Vice President Al Gore (D-Tennessee), Senator John Kerry (D-Massachusetts), and former Senator Mark Dayton (D-Minnesota).

Donilon was a managing member of MCD Strategies, a media consulting firm, for which he received compensation of at least $4 million.

Donilon served as managing director of the Biden Institute at the Joseph R. Biden, Jr. School of Public Policy & Administration, where he was also an assistant professor.

=== Biden administration ===
As his longtime advisor, Mike Donilon held significant influence over Joe Biden's successful 2020 campaign for president. He helped develop Biden's campaign strategy that had a three-pronged message: "that the election was about the 'soul of the nation'; that the threatened middle class was the 'backbone of the nation'; and that what was most needed was to 'unify the nation.' Only Biden could restore the nation's soul, repair its backbone, and unify it." "This is really about character and values as opposed to issues and ideology," Donilon told the New York Times in his capacity as chief strategist.

In November 2020, Donilon was named Senior Advisor to the President. In July 2024 he helped draft the letter that Biden used to announce his withdrawal from the 2024 United States presidential election.

== Personal life ==
Donilon's brothers are BlackRock Investment Institute chair Tom Donilon, who was chief of staff in former President Bill Clinton's State Department and is a former National security adviser to Barack Obama, and Terry Donilon, Communications Director for the Archdiocese of Boston. His sister-in-law is Catherine M. Russell.
