= Nyein =

Nyein is a Burmese name. Notable people with the name include:

- Nyein Chan Aung (born 1996), Burmese professional footballer
- Nyein Htet Aung (born 1994), Burmese singer and actor
- Sitt Nyein Aye (born 1956), Burmese artist
- Maung Nyein Chan (1948–2010), Burmese comic book artist
- Nyein Chan (born 1991), Burmese professional footballer
- Nyein Chan Kyaw (born 1982), Burmese actor and writer
- Mahn Nyein Maung (born 1947), Karen politician and former rebel leader
- Taungdwin Shin Nyein Me, early 18th century Burmese poet
- Chan Nyein, former Minister for Education of Myanmar (Burma)
- Chuu Wai Nyein (born 1992), painter, performance artist and activist from Myanmar
- Kyar Ba Nyein (1923–1979), Burmese Lethwei fighter and Olympic boxer
- Kyaw Nyein (1913–1986), former Minister of Home Affairs in U Nu's administration
- Mya Nyein, Deputy Speaker of the upper house of Burma's parliament
- Myo Myint Nyein, journalist and political activist in Myanmar
- Myoma Nyein (1909–1955), Burmese musician and composer
- Than Nyein (1937–2014), Burmese politician and physician
- Thaung Su Nyein (born 1977), Burmese businessman
- Tun Kyaw Nyein (born 1949), Burmese doctor, university administrator, former political prisoner
- Han Nyein Oo (born 1989), Burmese social media personality, pro-military supporter and lobbyist
- Saw Nyein Oo, mother of King Alaungpaya, the founder of the Konbaung Dynasty of Burma
- A Nyein Phyu (born 1996), Burmese actress, model and dancer
- Nyein Chan Su (born 1973), Burmese painter
- Nyein Thaw (born 1993), Burmese actor and model
- Nyein Thit, pen-name of Thaung Tun, Burmese editor, filmmaker, and poet
- Aye Nyein Thu (born 1995), Burmese doctor known for voluntary work
- Maung Nyein Thu (born 1947), Burmese writer
- Nyein Way, poet from Myanmar

== See also ==
- Yan Nyein Aung-class submarine chaser (Project PGG 063), the first indigenous stealth submarine chaser class of the Myanmar Navy
- Ma Nyein Thaw Mee, 2002 Burmese drama film
