= Myanmar National Literature Award for Translation =

Burma National Literature Awards (Translation)
- Awarded for: Excellence in translation from a foreign language
- Country: Burma (Myanmar)
- Presented by: Government of Burma
- First award: 1962

Burma National Literature Awards for Translation (Burmese: အမျိုးသားစာပေဆု - ဘာသာပြန်) is a literary prize granted each year to an author who has translated from a foreign language by the government committee. It has been awarded since 1962. The award has two sections: Fiction and General Knowledge.

== National Literature Award for Translation (Fiction) ==
No awards were given in the years not listed.

Year	Burmese title	Translator	Original novel	Original author
2019	Warsaw-ka Yoke-thae Sayar-lay ဝါဆောကရုပ်သေးဆရာလေး	Sein Win Sen	The Puppet of Warsaw	Eva Weaver
2018	Mite-sar Kyun မိစ္ဆာကျွန်း	Wai Yan Phone	Lord of the Flies	William Golding
2017	Aisa Wuttu-to Myar အာရှဝတ္ထုတိုများ	Tint Zaw	Asian Short Stories	Various writers
2012	Pyit Hume Ne Pyit Dan ပြစ်မှုနှင့်ပြစ်ဒဏ်	Tin Maung Myint	Crime and Punishment	Fyodor Dostoyevsky
2011	Hmyaw မျှော်	Tin Maung Myint	Waiting	Ha Jin
2010	Yae Kan Thar Kyar Time Aye ရေကန်သာကြာတိုင်းအေး	Nay Win Myint	The Glass Palace	Amitav Ghosh
2008	Power Kya Sone Chine Hinin Singapore Bawa Yanent Wutto Mya ပါဝါကျဆုံးခြင်းနှင့်စင်္ကာပူရနံ့ဝတ္ထုတိုများ	Win Zaw Htut	One Singapore: 65 Stories by a Singaporean	Goh Sin Tub
2007	Anet Yaung Eainmet Sein Mya Myint Tar အနက်ရောင်အိပ်မက်စိမ်းမြမေတ္တာ	Tin Maung Myint	A Place for Kathy	Henry Denker
2006	Kan Kya Mar A-kyin Thar ကံကြမ္မာအကျဉ်းသား	Maung Paw Tun	Mera Naam Joker	K. A. Abbas
2005	Bawa A-Lwin Eain ဘဝအလွမ်းအိမ်	Maung Ye Khine	A House for Mr Biswas	V. S. Naipaul
2004	Taung Pan Mae Thin Kwe Tae So Nget တောင်ပံမဲ့သင်းကွဲတေးဆိုငှက်	Tin Maung Myint	To Kill a Mockingbird	Harper Lee
2003	Won Pa Lwe Myae Nae Ka Kone Thu ဝံပုလွေများနှင့်ကခုန်သူ	Maung Htun Thu	Dances with Wolves	Michael Blake
2002	Karamazov Nyi Ako Myar ကာရာမာဇော့ညီအစ်ကိုများ	Net Ngwe	The Brothers Karamazov	Fyodor Dostoevsky
2001	Nat Lone Thar Htae Har Apyae Shar နှလုံးသားထဲမှာ အဖြေရှာ	Myat Nyein	Follow Your Heart	Susanna Tamaro
2000	Zayar Oo Gyi ဇရာအိုကြီး	Htun Myat Aye	The Old Man	William Faulkner
1997	Kantarya San Yae Eaing ကန္တာရစမ်းရေအိုင်	Maung Paw Tun	Annie	Thomas Meehan
1996	Mingalar Par Sayar Ma မင်္ဂလာပါဆရာမ	Theit Soe	Good Morning, Miss Dove	Frances Gray Patton
1995	A Chit Moe Kaung Kin အချစ်မိုးကောင်းကင်	Mya Than Tint	Beyond Love	Dominique Lapierre
1994	Bot Chan ဘော့ကျန်	Ye Mya Lwin	Botchan	Natsume Sōseki
1992	Thuka Myo Taw သုခမြို့တော်	Mya Than Tint	City of Joy	Dominique Lapierre
1988	Kan Saung Ne Einmet ခန်းဆောင်နီအိပ်မက်	Mya Than Tint	Dream of the Red Chamber	Cáo Xuěqín and followed Gāo È
1987	Kantarya Kha Yee Tae ကန္တာရခရီးသည်	Phone Myint (Mandalay)	Caravans	James A. Michener
1985	Gawri ဂေါရီ	Paragu	Bhuvanvikram	Vrindavan Lal Verma
1984	Lear Min Gyi လီယာမင်းကြီး	Min Thu Wun	King Lear	William Shakespeare
1983	Ye Tide ရဲတိုက်	Maung Htun Thu	The Citadel	A. J. Cronin
1981	Gulliver Ei Khayee Zin ဂါလီဗာ၏ခရီးစဉ်	Maung Htin	Gulliver's Travels	Jonathan Swift
1980	Tha Thaung Tha Nya Pone Pyin Myar -Vol-1 တစ်ထောင့်တစ်ညပုံပြင်များ - ၁	Kyaw Hlaing Oo	One Thousand and One Nights	Sir Richard Francis Burton
1979	Nin Lar Hae Chit Dokekha Nae Achar Wuttu-to Mya နင်လားဟဲ့ချစ်ဒုက္ခနှင့်အခြားဝတ္ထုတိုများ	Zawgyi	Short Stories by Nobel Prize Winners	Nobel Prize in Literature Winners
1978	Lay Yuu Thone Thone လေရူးသုန်သုန်	Mya Than Tint	Gone with the Wind	Margaret Mitchell
1974	Mowgli Nae Taw Hain Won Swint Sar Kan Myar မောဂ္ဂလိနှင့်တောဟေဝန်စွန့်စားခန်းများ	Htin Lin	The Jungle Book	Rudyard Kipling
1973	Yae Thu Ma Lay Nae Achar Andersen Pone Wuttu Myar ရေသူမလေးနှင့်အခြား အန်ဒါဆင်း ပုံဝတ္ထုများ	Aunt Maung	The Little Mermaid and Other Andersen Fairy Tales	Hans Christian Andersen
1972	Sit Nink Nyein Chan Yay စစ်နှင့်ငြိမ်းချမ်းရေး	Mya Than Tint	War and Peace	Leo Tolstoy
1970	Thu Toe Tone Yaurk သူတို့သုံးယောက်	Taung Twin Ko Ko Gyi	Three of Them	Maxim Gorky
1969	Oo Lay Tom ဦးလေးတွမ်	Kyaw Hlaing Oo	Uncle Tom's Cabin	Harriet Beecher Stowe
1968	Pin Lae Pyar Nae Tanga O ပင်လယ်ပြာနှင့်တံငါအို	Maung Hsu Shin	The Old Man and the Sea	Ernest Hemingway
1968	Nanet-khin Ko Soe-moe-thu နံနက်ခင်းကို စိုးမိုးသူ	Mya Thein (Tatmadaw Pyinyar Yae)	Command the Morning	Pearl S. Buck
1968	Yae-twe Ni Ni ရဲသွေးနီနီ	Aung Khant	Quentin Durward	Walter Scott
1968	Phae Tha-mar ဖဲသမား	San Lwin	The Gambler	Fyodor Dostoyevsky
1967	Taw Yaine Myae တောရိုင်းမြေ	Kyaw Aung	Virgin Soil Upturned	Mikhail Aleksandrovich Sholokhov
1967	Thwe-myae Ko Kyaw Khine Yae သွေးမြေကို ကျောခိုင်း၍	Khin Gyi Aung	A Farewell to Arms	Ernest Hemingway
1967	Tolstoy Ei Wutt-htu Nga Poke တော့စတွိုင်း၏ ဝတ္ထုနှစ်ပုဒ်	Tin Sein Nge	Two Novels	Leo Tolstoy
1967	Ar-zar-ni Kyaung-thar Maung-hna-ma Zoya Hae Shura Ahtut-phat-ti အာဇာနည်ကျောင်းသား မောင်နှမ ဇိုယာနှင့်ရှုရာ အတ္ထုပ္ပတ္တိ	U Ba Tin	The Story of Zoya and Shura	L. Kosmodemyanskaya
1966	Laung Yake Pan လောင်းရိပ်ပန်း	Aung Kyaw Kyaw	The Hidden Flower	Pearl S. Buck
1964	Julius Caesar ဂျူးလိယက်ဆီဆာ	Man Tin	Julius Caesar	William Shakespeare
1964	Yadanar Shwe Myae ရတနာရွှေမြေ	U Hla Din	The Land of the Great Image	Maurice Collis
1964	Godan ဂိုဒါန်	Maw Thiyi	Godaan	Munshi Premchand
1964	Swut-chu Paya-say Thakin Yae ဆွတ်ချူပါရစေ သခင်ရယ်	Maung Kyi Oo	The Patriot	Pearl S. Buck
1963	Nyi Taw Min Nan ညီတော်မင်းနန်	Paragu	Saundaranandakavya	Aśvaghoṣa
1963	Myo-won-min Ei Bawa Khayee မြို့ဝန်မင်း၏ ဘဝခရီး	Dagon Shwe Myar	The Mayor of Casterbridge	Thomas Hardy
1963	Marco Polo မာကိုပိုလို	U Hla Din	Marco Polo	Maurice Collis
1962	Yoedayar White ယိုးဒယားဝှိုက်	U San Win	Siamese White	Maurice Collis

== National Literature Award for Translation (General Knowledge) ==
Year	Burmese title	Translator	Original novel	Original author
2013	Koe Ko Koe Khoe Toe Yae Thar Won ကိုယ့်ကိုယ်ကိုကိုး တိုး၍သာဝင်	Natmauk Ani Cho	Lean In	Sheryl Sandberg
2012	Myanmarpyi Hma Naeyet Myar မြန်မာပြည်မှ နေ့ရက်များ	Maung Myint Kywe	Burmese Days	George Orwell
2011	Naing Ngan Myarr Ei Oatsar Dana နိုင်ငံများ၏ ဥစ္စာဓန	U Kyi Myint (Latha)	The Wealth of Nations	Adam Smith
2010	Eaindiya Ko Twe Shi Chin အိန္ဒိယကို တွေ့ရှိခြင်း	Boe Hlaing	The Discovery of India	Jawaharlal Nehru
2009	Thwe Nae Yae Nan သွေးနှင့်ရေနံ	Ye Tint	Blood and Oil: The Dangers and Consequences of America's Growing Petroleum Dependency	Michael Klare
2008	Kyan-Zi-Min Thokmahoke Tayoke Pyi Ko Pyaung Lae Kae Thu ကျန်ဇီမင်း သို့မဟုတ် တရုတ်ပြည်ကို ပြောင်းလဲခဲ့သူ	Taw Kaung Min	The Man Who Changed China	Robert Lawrence Kuhn
2007	Luu Winkaymu Thamine Ashie Taing Ka Ya Taw Amawe လူ့ယဉ်ကျေးမှုသမိုင်း အရှေ့တိုင်းကရသောအမွေ	Hlaing Thin	The Story of Civilization (Our Oriental Heritage)	Will Durant
2006	Kabar Pyar Pee ကမ္ဘာပြားပြီ	Kyaw Win	The World Is Flat	Thomas Friedman
2005	Eain Mat Kwint Arr Pyint Kabar Kyaw Thu, Soichiro Honda အိပ်မက်ခွန်အားဖြင့် ကမ္ဘာကျော်သူ ဟွန်ဒါဆိုးအိချိရော	Nan Mya Kay Khine		
2004	Ohm Nauk Myar Ko Mee Nyie Chin ဦးနှောက်ကို မီးညှိခြင်း	Boe Hlaing	Wings of Fire	A. P. J. Abdul Kalam
2003	Sit Phet Kaung Saung Mhu Ei Myat Nar Phone စစ်ဖက်ခေါင်းဆောင်မှု၏မျက်နှာဖုံး	Hlaing Thin	The Mask of Command	John Keegan
2002	Thettaya Kabar Hma Padama Kabar Tho တတိယကမ္ဘာမှ ပထမကမ္ဘာသို့	Hein Latt	From Third World to First: The Singapore Story	Lee Kuan Yew
2001	Madame Curie မဒမ်ကျူရီ	Tin Maung Myint	Madame Curie	Ève Curie
2000	Miba Kaung Toae Yinthwe Phyu Zu Phyoe Taung Nee မိဘကောင်းတို့ ရင်သွေးပြုစုပျိုးထောင်နည်း	Professor Daw Aye Than		
1999	Sagar Pyaw Thaw Kotwin Ingar Myar စကားပြောသော ကိုယ်တွင်းအင်္ဂါများ	Kyaw Zay Yaw (Pathein)	I am Joe's body	JD Ratcliff
1998	Nay Won Bayin Myar နေဝင်ဘုရင်များ	Kyaw Aung	Lords of the Sunset	Maurice Collis
1995	O Jerusalem! အို ဂျေရုဆလင်	Kyaw Aung	O Jerusalem!	Dominique Lapierre and Larry Collins
1986	Myanmar Pyi Thein Tike Pawe မြန်မာပြည်သိမ်းတိုက်ပွဲ	Aung Than (Mandalay)		
1985	Anatahan အနာတဟန်	Sein Khin Maung Yee	Anatahan	Michiro Maruyama

== See also ==
- Myanmar National Literature Award
