= Maung Paw Tun =

Burmese writer and translator (1935–2022)

- မောင်ပေါ်ထွန်း
- Born: Khin Maung Soe; 14 May 1935; Shwemyetwa Village, Manaung, British Burma
- Died: 13 August 2022 (aged 87); South Okkalapa Township, Yangon, Myanmar
- Education: Workers' College (BA)
- Occupation: Writer
- Writing career
- Language: Burmese
- Genre: Translation
- Notable works: Kan-taa-ya San-yay-aing (1997); Kam-kya-ma Ah-kyin-thaa (2006)
- Notable awards: Myanmar National Literature Award for Translation (1997, 2006); Myanmar National Literature Award for Lifetime Achievement (2014)

Signature
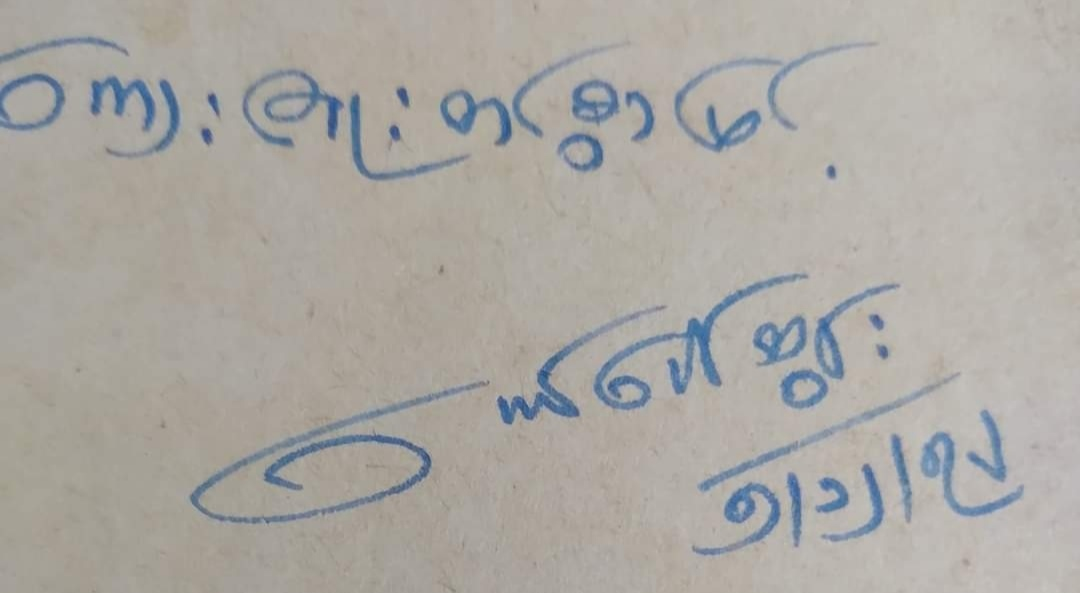

Maung Paw Tun (born Khin Maung Soe; Burmese: မောင်ပေါ်ထွန်း pronounced [màʊɰ̃ pɔ̀ tʰʊ́ɰ̃]; 14 May 1935 – 13 August 2022) was a Burmese writer and translator. Winning the national literature award for translation two times, he was a laureate of the national literature award for lifetime achievement.

== Early life ==
Paw Tun was born on 14 May 1935, to Maung Pu and Aye, in Shwemyetwa Village, Manaung Township, Rakhine State. After completing secondary education in his native town, at the age of 15, he continued his studies at a private school in Yangon. He passed the matriculation examination with distinction in English in 1968, and got a Bachelor of Arts degree in history from Workers' College in 1973. While studying in Yangon, Paw Tun competed and won first prize in the competition of stenography. In 1955, he started working as a stenographer in Sarpay Beikman of which he eventually retired as a supervisor in 1978.

== Career ==
Paw Tun entered the literary world in 1958 with the translation of a Russian tale, Seven-Year-Old Girl, his first novel being Revolt on the Nile (1974). He later worked as an editor, editor-in-chief and consultant editor at the magazines Pen, Cherry, and Cee-bwaa-yay. Paw Tun wrote more than 50 translated novels; his renowned works include biographies of Sukarno, Kyun-ma Chit-te Sukarno ('Sukarno Who I Love'), and of Yevgeny Yevtushenko, Yevtushenko. Mountbatten Hnint India Lutlatyay Taikpwe, his translation of Mountbatten and the Partition of India, and Harvard Cee-bwaa-yay Tekkatho Hma Ma-thin-khe-ya-thamya, translated from What They Don't Teach You at Harvard Business School are also popular.

In 1998, Kan-taa-ya San-yay-aing ('Dessert Pond'), his translation of Annie by Thomas Meehan, won Myanmar National Literature Award for Translation for 1997. He won his second award in the same category for 2006 with Kam-kya-ma Ah-kyin-thaa ('Prisoner of Kamma'), the translation of Mera Naam Joker by Khwaja Ahmad Abbas.

Paw Tun was awarded the Myanmar National Literature Award for Lifetime Achievement for 2014 by the government, being the first recipient from the translation field.

== Death ==
Paw Tun was hospitalised for colon cancer in July and died on 13 August 2022, at his residence in South Okkalapa Township in Yangon.
