= The Moon Lotus =

2011 Burmese film

- Film Poster
- Burmese: ပန်းကြာဝတ်မှုန်
- Directed by: Sin Yaw Mg Mg
- Screenplay by: Nay Win Myint
- Based on: Pann Kyar Wutt Hmone by Khin Khin Htoo
- Starring: Nine Nine; Thet Mon Myint
- Cinematography: Tint San
- Music by: Diramore
- Production company: Chin Dwin Film Production
- Release dates: December 30, 2011 (some Yangon townships); January 26, 2012 (Hua Hin International Film Festival)
- Running time: 130 minutes
- Country: Myanmar
- Language: Burmese
- Budget: 210 million MMK

The Moon Lotus (Burmese: ပန်းကြာဝတ်မှုန်) is a 2011 Burmese romantic drama film, directed by Sin Yaw Mg Mg and screenplay by Nay Win Myint starring Nine Nine and Thet Mon Myint. It is an adaptation of the novel Pann Kyar Wutt Hmone by Khin Khin Htoo. The film was produced by Chin Dwin Film Production. The film's sound systems, music and subtitles were made at the Technicolor in Thailand.

== Plot ==
Around the year 1980, U Lay Phone and Daw Khin Khin Lay had a daughter, Thiri May, and a son, Thiha Maung, who lived in Myingyan. When Thiri May was attending at the Mandalay University, she was friends with Aung Naing Thu from Kalaw.

Aung Naing Thu attracted attention after performing on the harp at a university freshman welcome event. Although he and Thiri May had romantic feelings for each other, neither openly expressed them. During long university holidays, Aung Naing Thu visited Myingyan, Thiri May’s hometown, while Thiri May visited Kalaw, his hometown.

After finishing school, Aung Naing Thu had to go abroad and married a foreigner. Thiri May's parents also prospered from the establishment of Thanaka business, and due to the ability of their son Thiha Maung, they was able to establish international-level Thanaka and makeup company and factory. Thiri May had an affair with the factory manager Ko Aye Moe, but refused to marry Ko Aye Moe. Thiri May often went to rest at the apartment in "Pann Kyar Wutt Hmone" yard in Pyin Oo Lwin.

After 20 years, Aung Naing Thu broke up with his wife, a foreigner of different culture and religion and came to visit Myanmar. And so, at the "Pann Kyar Wutt Hmone" yard in Pyin Oo Lwin, Thiri May's friends including Aung Naing Thu gathered and talked individually about their current lives and experiences. How will Thiri May respond when Aung Naing Thu asks for her love?

== Cast ==
- Nine Nine as Aung Naing Thu
- Thet Mon Myint as Thiri May
- Phyo Ngwe Soe as Aye Moe
- May Kabyar
- Ye Aung
- Si Thu Maung
- Thin Thin Yu Hlaing
- Zin Myo
- Min Htet Kyaw Zin
- Kyaw Kyaw Paing Hmue
- Aung Aung
- Khin Lay Nwe
- Hayman Aung Aung
- Thiri Shin Thant

== Release ==
It premiered at Hua Hin International Film Festival in Thailand on January 26, 2012.

It premiered in Singapore on November 17, 2012.

It premiered in Myanmar cinemas on June 14, 2013.

It premiered in Thailand cinemas on September 26, 2013.

It premiered at Asean Film Festival in Myanmar on March 17, 2014.

It premiered at Pyongyang International Film Festival in North Korea on September 19, 2014.

It premiered at Golden Rooster-Hundred Flowers Film Festival in China on September 23, 2014.

== Awards and nominations ==
Year	Award	Category	Nominee	Result	Ref
2011	Myanmar Motion Picture Academy Awards	Best Cinematography	Tint San	Won	
2011	Myanmar Motion Picture Academy Awards	Best Sound	San Oo	Won	
