= Kundaung =

Offertory commonly carried in Burmese celebrations

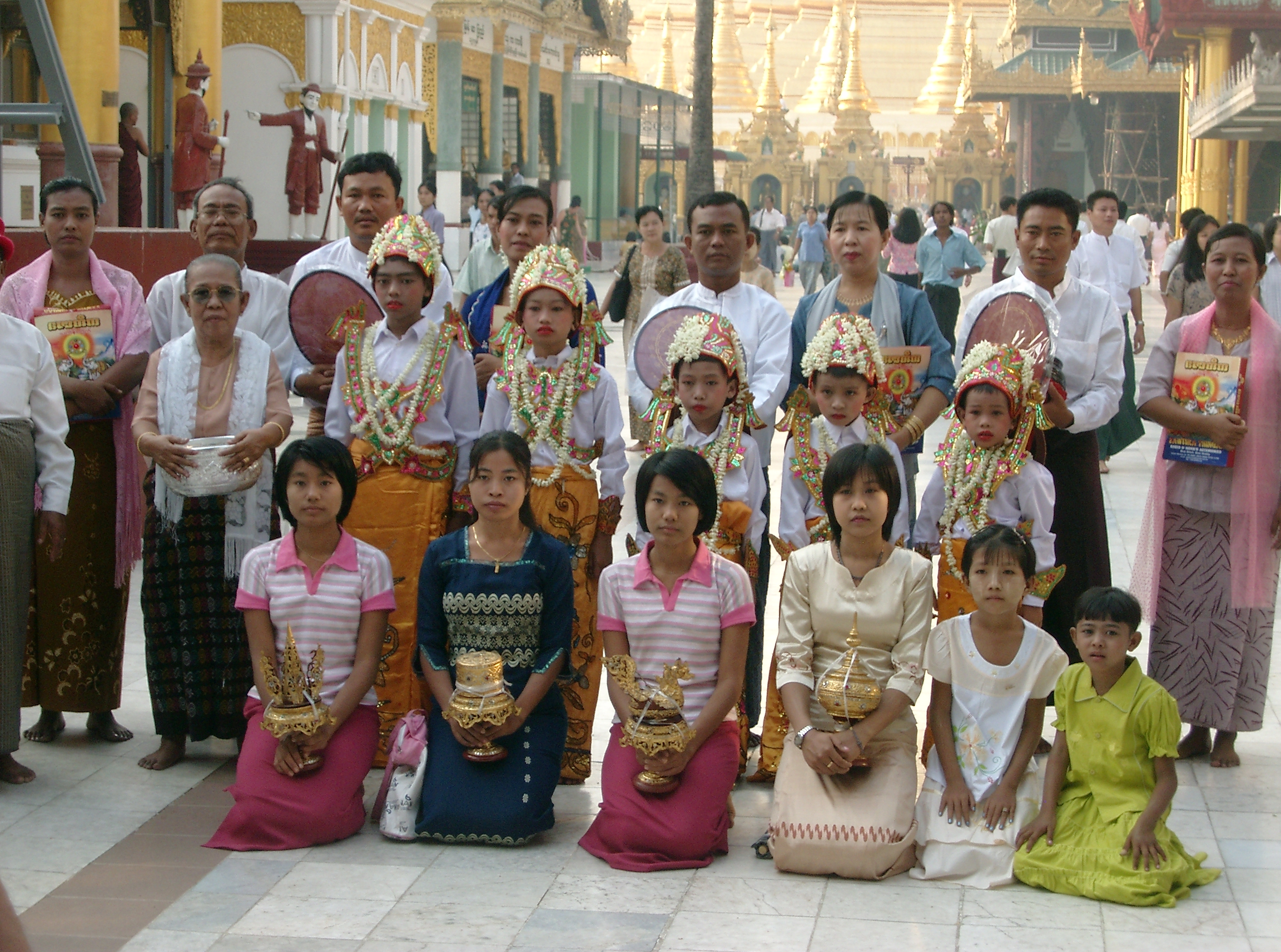
A kneeling girl (furthest left) carries as ornamental kundaung.

Kundaung (Burmese: ကွမ်းတောင်, Burmese pronunciation: [kʊ́ɴdàʊɴ];"betel leaf holder") is an offertory commonly carried in Burmese celebrations, such as shinbyu (novitiation) and ear-boring procession ceremonies. The bearers are known as kundaungkaing (ကွမ်းတောင်ကိုင်), which has the figurative meaning of "village belle." The modern kundaung is typically made as an ornamental tray with leaf-like protrusions, gilt with lacquer, goldleaf, or glass mosaic.

In Upper Myanmar, several localities, including Butalin Township in Sagaing Region, have preserved a tradition to make elaborate multi-tiered kundaung, variously known as phetsein kundaung (ဖက်စိမ်းကွမ်းတောင်), myaphet kundaung (မြဖက်ကွမ်းတောင်), or myasein kundaung (မြစိမ်းကွမ်းတောင်), from tender banana leaves, flowers, and other ornamental plants, resembling a spired pagoda. These floral arrangements are similar to Thai and Laotian offertories, variously called krathong (กระทง), baisri (บายศรี) and pha khwan (ພາຂວັນ). This traditional craft is disappearing. Only virgin maidens whose mother and father are alive, are specially selected to carry these kundaung for such processions. Burmese writer Khin Khin Htoo has featured the phetsein kundaung as the title of her short story collection, Phet Sein Kun Taung Shwe Wuttu-To Mya, as well as her novel Ma Ein Kan (မအိမ်ကံ).
