= Ma Sandar =

Burmese writer

Ma Sandar မစန္ဒာ
- Born: Cho Cho Tin; 4 September 1947 (age 78); Rangoon, British Burma (now Myanmar)
- Education: Rangoon Institute of Technology
- Occupations: novelist, architect
- Writing career
- Period: 1972–present
- Genres: Romance, Short story
- Notable works: Life's Dream, Flower's Dream; Short Stories Collection 3 Hexagon
- Notable awards: Myanmar National Literature Award (1994, 1999, 2002)

Ma Sandar (Burmese: မစန္ဒာ; born 4 September 1947) is a well known Burmese writer. With a clear and engaging style, her works reflect the daily struggles of the people living in Myanmar. Her novella, Life's Dream, Flower's Dream won the 1994 Myanmar National Literature Award for novella. Her short stories collection, Short Stories Collection 3 won the 1999 Myanmar National Literature Award for Collected Short Stories. Another novella, Hexagon won the 2002 National Literature Award for novella. 10 of her novels have been made into movies.

== Early life and education ==
She was born in Yangon and attended the Myoma All-Girls High School. She graduated in 1965, and her first short story, Me, the Teacher was published in a magazine in the same year. She attended Rangoon Institute of Technology with a major in architecture. After graduating, she worked in the Ministry of Construction, Architecture Team 2. Her first novel Don't Know Because I am Young was published in 1972. Throughout her life, she has produced so far, over 100 short short stories and short stories, 2 novellas and 13 novels.

== Selected works ==
=== Novels ===
1. Sum
2. Pending of New Green Leaves
3. Tomorrow
4. Rose
5. Cloudy Moon
6. Keeping Bad Mood in Mind Silently
7. Please Fulfill My Blank
8. G Hall Thu
9. Circle
10. Don't Know Because I Am Young
11. Star Flower
12. The Shadow

=== Novella ===
1. Life's Dream, Flower's Dream
2. Hexagon

=== Short stories ===
1. Short Stories Collection 3
2. Me, the Teacher

== Awards ==
- In 1994, National Literary Award for novella
- In 1999, Myanmar National Literature Award for Collected Short Stories
- In 2002, National Literary Award for novella
