= Kyaw Win (writer) =

Burmese politician, author, and journalist (born 1952)

Kyaw Win ကျော်ဝင်း
- Born: Pe Thein; April 20, 1952 (age 73); Monywa, Sagaing Region, Myanmar
- Occupations: Writer; politician; journalist
- Parent(s): Ba Sein; Ohn Sein
- Awards: Myanmar National Literature Award (2004, 2006)

Kyaw Win (Burmese: ကျော်ဝင်း) is a Burmese writer, politician, and journalist. He won the Myanmar National Literature Award two times.

== Biography and careers ==
He was born in Monywa, Sagaing Region, Burma (now Myanmar) on 24 April 1952, to U Ba Sein and Daw Ohn Sein. He is the youngest of seven siblings.

He spent middle and high school years studying at Basic Education High School No. 1 in Monywa. After high school, he continued his education from 1968–69 at the University of Medicine, Mandalay. Due to political positions, he dropped out of university and went underground. Later, he returned to the Mandalay University and received a Bachelor of Science in Chemistry in 1987.

== Literary careers ==
From 1975–76 he served as an editor of Annual magazine of the University of Medicine, Mandalay.

After his release from prison in July 1994, he started literature work with an article entitled "Challenging Development." Since then he has written articles on international and translation topics in magazines and social journals.

From 2000 to the end of 2007, he published 63 books. In 2004 the book Brain Storming was released, for which he received the Sayawun Tin Shwe Award. He also won the 2006 Myanmar National Literature Award for his translation of the book The World is Flat (ကမ္ဘာပြားပြီ).

He has served as chief editor of Zabephyu magazine and as the editor of the Khit San and Moe journals.

== Personal life ==
He is married to Kyu Kyu Myint and they have three children.

== Published books ==
- The World's Tomorrow (ကမ္ဘာကြီးရဲ့ မနက်ဖြန်), 2002
- Their Views, Their Words (သူတို့ အမြင် သူတို့ အပြေ), 2004
- The World is Now Flat (ကမ္ဘာပြားပြီ), 2006
- Bagan in History, History in Bagan (သမိုင်းထဲက ပုဂံ ပုဂံထဲက သမိုင်း), 2011
