= Mya Than Tint =

Burmese writer (1929–1998)

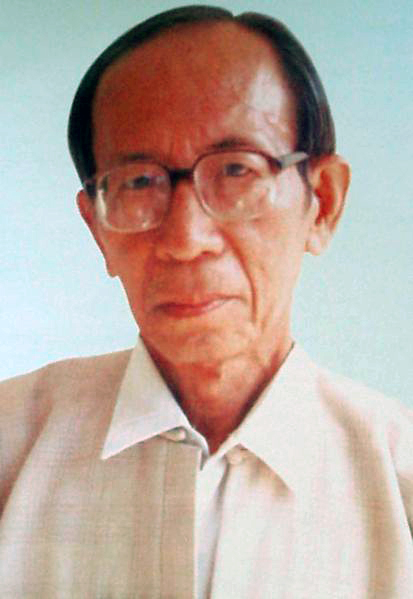
- Mya Than Tint
- Born: 23 May 1929; Myaing, Pakokku Township, British Burma
- Died: 18 February 1998 (aged 68); Yangon, Myanmar
- Occupations: novelist, translator
- Spouse: Khin Ma Ma
- Writing career
- Pen name: Mya Than Tint
- Period: 1949 - 1998
- Genres: Romance, Short story, Translation
- Notable works: Dataung Ko Kyaw Ywei, Mee Pinle Ko Hpyat Myi (Across the Mountain of Swords and the Sea of Fire) (1973)
- Notable awards: 1972, 1978, 1989, 1993, 1995: National Literature Award (5 times)

Mya Than Tint (Burmese: မြသန်းတင့်, MLCTS: mra. san: tang. [mja̰ θáɰ̃ tɪ̰ɰ̃]; 23 May 1929 – 18 February 1998) was a five-time Myanmar National Literature Award winning Burmese writer and translator.

== Biography ==
Born Mya Than on 23 May 1929 in Myaing, Pakokku Township, Magway Division, Myanmar, he was the eldest of seven children to Paw Tint and his wife Hlaing.

Mya Than Tint entered Rangoon University in 1948, the year Burma gained independence from Great Britain, and received a degree in philosophy, political science and English literature in 1954.

His writing career began in 1949 when his first short novel “Refugee” (ဒုက္ခသည်) was published in Tara (တာရာ) Magazine (No. 21, Vol. 3, 1949). His first translated work was Malva and other short stories by Gorky.He published many short and full-length novels, documentaries and translated works in his 50-year writing career.

Dataung Ko Kyaw Ywei, Mee Pinle Ko Hpyat Myi (Across the Mountain of Swords and the Sea of Fire) (ဓားတောင်ကိုကျော်၍ မီးပင်လယ်ကိုဖြတ်မည်) (1973) is considered to be his greatest masterpiece. He also wrote historical documentaries like “Breeze over Taungthaman Lake” (တောင်သမန်ရွှေအင်းက လေညှင်းဆော်တော့).

Also a prolific translator of Western literature into Burmese, Mya Than Tint introduced his readers to world classics like War and Peace (စစ်နှင့် ငြိမ်းချမ်းရေး), Gone with the Wind (လေရူးသုန်သုန်), and Dream of the Red Chamber (ခန်းဆောင်နီအိပ်မက်). He won the Myanmar National Literature Award five times for translation War and Peace(1972), Gone with the Wind (1978), Dream of the Red Chamber (1988), City of Joy (သုခမြို့တော်) (1992) and Beyond Love (အချစ်မိုးကောင်းကင်) (1995).

As a political prisoner, Mya Than Tint was jailed from 1963 to 1972 by Ne Win's military regime that seized power from a democratic government in 1962. He was initially incarcerated in Rangoon's notorious Insein Prison, but later transferred with other political prisoners to the Coco Islands penal colony in the Indian Ocean until his release three years later. At the age of 68, he died in his home in Sanchaung Township in Rangoon of a brain hemorrhage after an accidental fall from a staircase in the early morning of February 18, 1998. He was cremated at the Hteinpin cemetery in Rangoon.

== Literary works ==
Famous Burmese Novels by Mya Than Tint:

- Myit-tar Athinchay-Infinite Love
- Dataung Ko Kyaw Ywei, Mee Pinle Ko Hpyat Myi - Across the Mountain of Swords and the Sea of Fire (1973)
- A-hmaung Yeik We - In the Dark Shadow (1960)
- Annyattara Yoke Pon Hlwa - Images of Ordinary People
- Like Hkedaw Mya Nanda - Run with me, Mya Nanda (1960)
- Khit Pyaing Yoke Pon Hlwa - Images of Our Modern Era
- Pondaung Ponnya Thwa Tawla - Travelogue of Pondaung Ponnya
- Taungthaman Shwe Inn ga Lei-hnyin Sawdaw - Breeze over Taungthaman Lake (1999)
- "The City of Joy"
- "Than Chaung"
- "Kankaung"
- "Khuntaw Satye Chinthaw Wutthumyar" ( The Stories I wanna continue writing)
- "Myanmar:The longest war" 2015
- "The Art of Writing"

His collection of short stories Annyattara Yoke Pon Hlwa (Images of Ordinary People) has been translated in English titled On the Road to Mandalay.

== Translations ==
Well Known Works of Translation into Burmese:

No	Burmese Name	No. of Volumes	Original Novel	Original Author	Note
1	Sit Nink Nyein Chan Yay (စစ်နှင့် ငြိမ်ချမ်းရေး)	12 Vols:	War and Peace	Leo Tolstoy	1972 National Literature Award for Best Translation
2	Lei Yuu Thon Thon (လေရူးသုန်သုန်)	2 Vols:	Gone with the Wind	Margaret Mitchell	1978 National Literature Award for Best Translation
3	Pari Kya Sone Gan (ပါရီကျဆုံးခန်း)	3 Vols:	The Fall of Paris	Ilya Ehrenburg	
4	Shwe Pyidaw Hmyaw Daing Way (ရွှေပြည်တော်မျှော်တိုင်းဝေး)	8 Vols:	The Far Pavilions	M. M. Kaye	
5	Lei Lwint Thu (လေလွင့်သူ)	-	The Catcher in the Rye	J. D. Salinger	
6	Meinma do Akyawn (မိန်းမတို့ အကြောင်း)	2 Vols:	The Second Sex	Simone de Beauvoir	
7	Kan Saung Ni Einmet (ခန်းဆောင်နီအိပ်မက်)	9 Vols:	Dream of the Red Chamber	Cao Xueqin	1988 National Literature Award for Best Translation
8	Thuhka Myodaw (သုခမြို့တော်)	2 Vols:	City of Joy	Dominique Lapierre	1992 National Literature Award for Best Translation
9	A Chit Moe Kaungin (အချစ်မိုးကောင်းကင်)	2 Vols:	Beyond Love	Dominique Lapierre	1995 National Literature Award for Best Translation
10	Lwan Maw Khe Ya Thaw Tekkatho Nwei Nya Myar (လွမ်းမောခဲ့ရသော တက္ကသိုလ်နွေညများ)	3 Vols:	The Class	Erich Segal	
11	Lu Mya Thekkayit Mya Nink Bawa (လူများသက္ကရာဇ်နှင့် ဘဝ)	5 Vols:	Memories:Men, Years - Life	Ilya Ehrenburg	
12	Eikari Pwa Saw(ဧက္ကရီဖွားစော)	-	She Was a Queen	Maurice Collis	
13	Chit Thaw Yun Khin Khin (ချစ်သောယွန်းခင်ခင်)	-	the Lacquer Lady	F. Tennyson Jesse	
14	A-ywe Ma Taing Mi (အရွယ်မတိုင်မိ)	-	My Childhood	Maxim Gorky	
15	Bon-Le Ta Khwin	-	My Apprenticeship	Maxim Gorky	
16	Bawa Tekkatho (ဘဝတက္ကသိုလ်)	-	My Universities	Maxim Gorky	
17	Lar Chin Kaung Taw Ashin	2 Vols:	The Lord Comes	Robert Payne	
18	Asia A-Yone-Oo	-	Pacific Destiny	Robert Elegant	

Sherlock Holmes series into 5 Volumes -

- The Adventures of Sherlock Holmes
- The Memoirs of Sherlock Holmes
- The Return of Sherlock Holmes
- His Last Bow
- The Case-Book of Sherlock Holmes

== Quotes ==
- "Since my childhood, I have believed that writing is the most honourable job, and honour doesn’t mean material wealth, but honest and truthful dignity."
- "I will not exchange my job as a writer for anything."
- "I wouldn’t do now, I won’t do in the future."
