= Myo Myint Nyein =

- မျိုးမြင့်ညိမ်း
- Born: ca. 28 June 1952; Mandalay, Myanmar
- Education: B.Sc.(Physics)
- Alma mater: St. Paul School, B.E.H.S (6), Botahtaung township, Yangon
- Occupations: Editor-in-Chief, writer, human rights activist
- Known for: Editor, fight for democracy, human rights works, former political prisoner
- Children: 3

Myo Myint Nyein (Burmese: မျိုးမြင့်ညိမ်း) is a journalist and political activist in Myanmar. He spent twelve years in prison for publishing a poem critical of the country's military rulers and for highlighting poor prison conditions in Myanmar.

== Family ==
He was married to Daw Win Htay and has two sons and one daughter: Zar Ni Myo Myint Nyein, Bo Bo Myo Myint Nyein and Dari Myo Myint Nyein.

== Arrest and detention ==
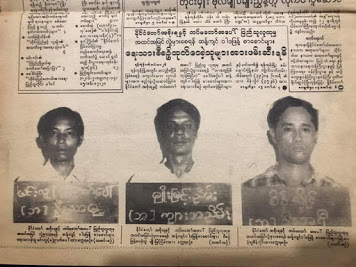

In 1990, after having published the critical poem “What is happening!” by Min Lu, Nyein was arrested and sentenced to seven years imprisonment. In response, PEN International recognized him as an honorary member in 1990. His imprisonment was extended by a further seven years in 1996. due to his publishing a newsletter about prison conditions, in collaboration with other inmates. Subject to torture, he managed to send a letter written and signed with the blood of political prisoners to the World Conference on Human Rights (1993) held in Vienna, Austria about the violation of human rights in the prison. Myo Myint Nyein organised many human rights movements in prison and was awarded the Freedom to Write Award by the Canadian Journalists for Freedom of Expression (CJFE) in 2001

As a consequence of a petition signed by journalists around the world and submitted to the Government of Myanmar by UN special rapporteur, Paulo Sergio Pinheiro, Nyein was released from Tharawaddy Prison on 13 February 2002. His release was welcomed by many journalists association and Human Rights Organizations.

== Editor in Chief ==
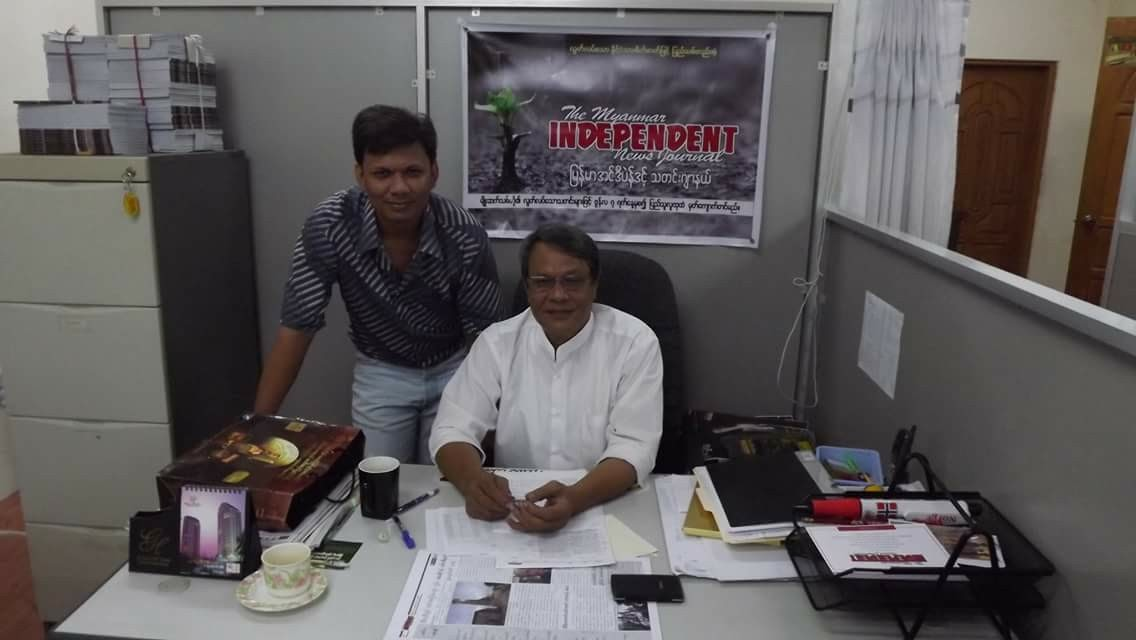

Since that time, he has served as the Editor-in-Chief of Shwe Essence Magazine. He served as an editor for the Ray of Light Journal until August 2016. He served as an editor for the Ray of Light Journal until August 2016. Additionally, from 2003 to 2013, he served as the Editor-in-Chief of the Teen monthly magazine until the Independence Weekly Journal was established in 2012. Additionally, from 2003 to 2013, he served as the Editor-in-Chief of the Teen monthly magazine until the Independence Weekly Journal was established in 2012. He was the editor of the Myanmar translation of 'the Glass Palace" written by Amitav Ghosh. It was translated into Burmese by Nay Win Myint and the book won the National Literature Award for translation in 2012.

In 2009, the country began to relax its repression of writers, which included the original writer and translator. Myo Myin Nyein served as a speaker at the Brown University's "A Freedom to Write Literary Festival." He served as the Editor in Chief of the Echo Journal from 2014 to 2016, and he has been the publisher of the Info-Digest since 2016, a bi-monthly journal that provides a concise approach to news presentation.

When the COVID-19 pandemic hit the country from late 2019 through 2020, the Shwe Essence magazine was closed. He founded the Shwe Athit Literary Online page and YouTube channel to sustain critical literary engagement under a restricted civic space.

== Defiance of Injustice ==
Published on 1 February 2021, Myo Myint Nyein’s book အဓမ္မကို အာခံခြင်း (Defiance of Injustice) is a prison memoir detailing his twelve years as a political prisoner. This book is a reflection of the moral strength and internal discipline needed to survive incarceration under authoritarian rule. The book is a record of the physical hardship of prison life but also the psychological struggle to maintain dignity, conscience, and political conviction, told through personal memories, reflections, and lived experience. It is a personal testimony and historical record of Myanmar’s long tradition of intellectual and political resistance. It provides readers with insight into the cost of dissent and the resilience of those who refuse to submit to injustice.

== PEN Myanmar ==
He was one of the founders of PEN Myanmar Center, a partner organisations of PEN International in 2013. Moreover, he was elected as a member of the board of PEN MM and acted as a treasurer till October 2016. He was re-elected to the board and entrusted as the President in December 2016
