= Myanmar National Literature Award for Collected Short Stories =

The Myanmar National Literature Award for Collected Short Stories is an award for the best collection of short stories by a Burmese author. This prize has been awarded since 1972.

Year	Book	Writer
2021	Gyitkankan Wuttu-to Mya ဂျစ်ကန်ကန်ဝတ္ထုတိုများ	Min Khaike Soe San မင်းခိုက်စိုးစန်
2008	Thinkharya Yatha Wuttu-to Mya သိင်္ဂါရ ရသဝတ္ထုတိုများ	Kyu Kyu Thain ကြူကြူသင်း
2007	Eaingalay 16 Lone အိမ်ကလေး ၁၆ လုံး	Nay Win Myint နေဝင်းမြင့်
2006	Bae Htee Than Wuttu-to Mya ဗေထီသံ ဝတ္ထုတိုများ	Kyi Naing ကြည်နိုင်
2005	Eitan Pyan Mu-di-tar Nge Myar အိပ်တန်းပြန် မုဒိတာငှက်များ	Yin Yin Nu (Mandalay) ယဉ်ယဉ်နု (မန္တလေး)
2004	Kan-sar-mu Theik-tae-sa A-met-ta-ya Wuttu-to Mya ခံစားမှု သိပ်သည်းဆ အမှတ်တရဝတ္ထုတိုများ	Down Nay Min ဒေါင်းနေမင်း
2003	Phat Sein Kyun Taung Shwe Wuttu-to Mya ဖက်စိမ်းကွမ်းတောင် ရွှေဝတ္ထုတိုများ	Khin Khin Htoo ခင်ခင်ထူး
2002	Tatan Mae Htu Tae သဏ္ဍာန်မဲ့ ထုထည်ဝတ္ထုတိုများ	Than Myint Aung သန်းမြင့်အောင်
2001	Taw Ya Htar Nae Achar Wuttu-to Mya တောရထားနှင့် အခြားဝတ္ထုတိုများ	Myoe Tar Ma Yar Thoe မြို့သာမရာထို
2000	Kamar Yin Kwae Hink Achar Pinlae Wuttu-to Mya ကမာရင်ကွဲနှင့် အခြားပင်လယ်ဝတ္ထုတိုများ	Mi Chan Wai မိချမ်းဝေ
1999	Wuttu-to Mya -3 ဝတ္ထုတိုများ (၃)	Ma Sandar မစန္ဒာ
1998	Please Add	Please Add
1997	Please Add	Please Add
1996	Please Add	Please Add
1995	Please Add	Please Add
1994	Please Add	Please Add
1993	Please Add	Please Add
1992	Sae Nae Kyo Wuttu-to Mya	Nay Win Myint

== See also ==
- Myanmar National Literature Award
