= Min Khaike Soe San =

Burmese writer (1972–2026)

- မင်းခိုက်စိုးစန်
- Born: 18 September 1972; Yangon, Myanmar
- Died: 19 June 2026 (aged 53); San Francisco, California, U.S.
- Occupations: Writer, physician, film director, screenwriter
- Writing career
- Pen name: Thadoe Tayza; Zaw Naing Ngan Soe
- Notable work: Gauche Stories
- Notable awards: Myanmar National Literature Award for Collected Short Stories (2021) S.E.A. Write Award (2023)

Min Khaike Soe San (Burmese: မင်းခိုက်စိုးစန်; born Kyaw Soe (ကျော်စိုး); 18 September 1972 – 19 June 2026) was a Burmese writer, physician, film director and screenwriter. He is best known for his novels ZERO (2003), Coffee Evening (2004), Broken Heart Junction of a Gypsy (2005), Tomorrow Programmed (2005), and Currency of the Kingdom of Death (2012). Min Khaike Soe San won the 2021 Myanmar National Literature Award for Collected Short Stories for his short story collection, Gauche Stories.

== Early life and education ==
Min Khaike Soe San was born in Yangon, Myanmar on 18 September 1972. His father, Mya Win, and his mother, Aye Kywe, were high school teachers. At the age of 5, his father died. His younger sister was also deceased, eight months after his father's funeral. He passed the matriculation exam with flying colors in 1988. Continuing his education, he obtained an M.B.B.S. degree from the Institute of Medicine 2 in 2001.

== Career ==
His first artwork printed in a periodical magazine is Sunlight Can Kill Germs. It is a one-page short story and was printed in 1989. His debut collection of short stories, titled Wings Entangled with the Sky, was published in 2000. His first novel, A Tree Died of Longing For, released in 2001, delves into the themes of belief and skepticism in fortune-telling. From then on, he balanced both medical practice and literary pursuits. While employed at North Okkalapa General Hospital, he translated the Harry Potter books.

From 2002, he refined his style in writing short stories and novels and also authored numerous poems. During those years, he frequently wrote screenplays for movies, with some of his screenplays earning nominations for the Myanmar Academy Awards. Additionally, he directed the popular TV show "Puzzle Palace" for 12 years. He directed two TV dramas: "Duel Fight between Two Flowers" (2017) and "Hospital Diary" (2018). As a film director, he also directed a feature film titled "The Moment," which has yet to be released.

Khaike Soe San also employed various pen names, including Thadoe Tayza and Zaw Naing Ngan Soe. Under the alias Thadoe Tayza, he authored over 40 works of fiction exploring fantastic and horror themes. Furthermore, he utilized the pseudonym "Zaw Naing Ngan Soe" to write over 20 detective fiction pieces.

He was the recipient of the 2021 Myanmar National Literature Award for Collected Short Stories for his work Gauche Stories.

== Death ==
Khaike Soe San died on 19 June 2026, at the age of 53.

== Works ==
=== Novels ===
- A Tree Died of Longing For (2001)
- Lovers at the beginning of the world (2002)
- Zero (2003)
- Raindrops for those concerned in soaking (2003)
- Coffee Evening (2004)
- Namesis and Me (2004)
- Let’s say that she is a monkey (2004)
- Heartbroken Junction of a Gypsy (2005)
- Stranger (2005)
- Tomorrow Programmed (2005)
- Daemon (2006)
- Cowardice milksop (2009)
- Being Pettish is hazardous for Health (2010)
- Currency of the Kingdom of Death (2012)
- The Bodyguard of a Birdie (2013)

=== Collections of short stories ===
- Wings Entangled with The Sky (2000)
- World’s Famous Ghost Stories (2002)
- Night of A Snooper (2003)
- Night at Grandeur Graveyard (2011)
- Logo for Satan (2011)
- Night of a Lion Call (2012)
- The Last Testament of a Ghost (2012)
- A Parrot’s Mouth (2012)
- Forgetful Village (2013)
- Mom Killed Me (2014)
- Prostitute-daughter (2015)
- End up this story’s finale yourself (2016)
- Actor the Great (2017)
- Time out or Play on? (2018)
- Gauche Stories (2021)
- A Tree Planted by a Daemon (2024)

=== Non-fiction ===
- Beginning of a new age and end of meanings (2003)
- Postmodern Youngster (2003)
- Ocean’s Textbook (2004)
- Memo of Witchcraft (2007)
- Thoughts of a Child (2009)
- IF (2011)
- Essay On Humor (2014)
- The Youth In The Tin Can (2023)
