= Pann Kyar Wutt Hmone =

2008 novel by Khin Khin Htoo

- Book cover
- Author: Khin Khin Htoo
- Original title: ပန်းကြာဝတ်မှုန်
- Language: Burmese
- Release number: 3
- Genre: Romance; Campus novel
- Publisher: Duwun
- Publication date: 2008 (first edition); July 2019 (third edition)
- Publication place: Burma
- Pages: 546 (third edition)

Pann Kyar Wutt Hmone (also spelt Pan Kyar Wut Hmone; Burmese: ပန်းကြာဝတ်မှုန်) is a romantic campus novel written by Burmese author Khin Khin Htoo. The novel was adapted into a 2011 film of the same name. The book was first published in 2008 by Duwun Publication.

== Synopsis ==
=== Plot ===
The story is set mostly Mandalay and the Mandalay Arts and Science University, and spans three timelines: 1980s, 1990s and 2000s.

=== Main characters ===
- Aung Naing Thu, a descent of then-demolished Shan Saopha family, is a student at Mandalay University, majoring in Burmese literature.
- Thiri May is a chemistry major student at Mandalay University.

== Legacy ==
=== Film version ===
Directed by Sin Yaw Mg Mg, the novel's film adaptation was released in 2011. Starred by Nine Nine and Thet Mon Myint as Aung Naing Thu and Thiri May respectively, the film won the Myanmar academy awards in two categories: Best Cinematography and Best Sound.
