= Khin Hnin Yu =

Burmese writer (1925–2003)

- ခင်နှင်းယု
- Born: Khin Su; 7 September 1925; Wakema, Wakema Township, British Burma
- Died: 21 January 2003 (aged 77); Yangon, Myanmar
- Occupation: writer
- Spouse: Kyaw Thaung (1950–1970)
- Relatives: U Nu (cousin)
- Writing career
- Period: 1952–2003
- Genres: Romance, short story
- Notable works: Hmwe (1959); Mya Kyar Phyu (1995)
- Notable awards: Myanmar National Literature Award (1961, 1995)

Khin Hnin Yu (ခင်နှင်းယု, pronounced [kʰɪ̀ɰ̃ n̥ɪ́ɰ̃ jṵ]; 7 September 1925 – 21 January 2003) was a two-time Myanmar National Literature Award winner. She is considered one of the most influential Burmese women writers. Her stories are known for their realistic portrayal of life in post-World War II Burma (now Myanmar). She is an early member of Distinguished women writers, who represent an ever-present force in Burmese literary history, along with Kyi Aye and San San Nweh. Almost all her over 50 published novels involve young heroines who had to struggle for their survival.

Khin Hnin Yu was a cousin of, and the personal secretary for, the former Burmese Prime Minister U Nu for more than 20 years. Khin Hnin Yu attended Myoma High School in Yangon. She died in 2003 at the age of 78.

== Biography ==
Khin Hnin Yu was born Khin Su (ခင်စု), the fifth of seven children, to Daw Thein Tin and school teacher U Ba in Wakema in the Irrawaddy delta. A cousin of U Nu, she served as the former Prime Minister's personal secretary for more than 20 years. She married Kyaw Thaung, a colonel in the Burmese army, in 1950.

Her first short story "Ayaing" ("The Wild") was published in Sar Padaytha magazine in 1947. In 1950, her first novel, Nwe Naung Ywet Kyan (နွေနှောင်းရွက်ကျန်; Remnant Leaf of Late Summer), was published in Shumawa magazine. She wrote over 50 novels and most are known for her political views of the parliamentary and military socialist eras (1948-1980s). For example, her 1955 short story "Mhyawlint Lo Phyint Ma Sohn Naing De" ("Still Hoping") covers the social stigma still faced by a daughter of former pagoda slaves. A semi-biographical novel Kyunma Chit Thu (ကျွန်မချစ်သူ; My Lover) was banned by Gen. Ne Win's government, and the themes of her later books shifted to focus on religion.

Khin Hnin Yu died in Yangon on 21 January 2003 at the Yangon General Hospital.

== Works ==
Khin Hnin Yu wrote over 50 novels and about six volumes of short-stories collections. Her famous works include:

Year	Book Title	Burmese	English Meaning	Notes
1953	Saung Twin Pan	ဆောင်းတွင်းပန်း	Winter's Flower	
1959	Hmwe	မွှေး	Sweet Scent	Semi-biographical; regarded as her masterpiece one of the most-printed Myanmar novels. 12 th time printed
1960	Sein Thint Mha Sein	စိမ်းသင့်မှစိမ်း	Leave Me If You Should	
1960	Kyemon Yeik Thwin Wuttu-to Myar	ကြေးမုံရိပ်သွင် ဝတ္ထုတိုများ	Mirror Image-Like Short Stories	Winner : Myanmar National Literature Award for Collected Short Stories
1961	Ngwe Naung Ywet Kyan	နွေနှောင်းရွက်ကျန်	Remnant Leaf of Late Summer	
1961	Pan Myar Ko Pwint Say Thu	ပန်းများကိုပွင့်စေသူ	Person who can Bloom Flowers	
1962	Pan Pan Lhwet Par	ပန်းပန်လျက်ပါ	Still Wearing Flower	
1962	Tha Khwet Pan	သခွတ်ပန်း	Thakhut Flower	
1962	Aung Myin Tgaw Ngae	အောင်မြင်သောနေ့	Victorious Day	
1963	Moe Kyaw Thu	မိုးကျော်သူ	Moe Kyaw Thu	
1964	Tharahpu	သရဖူ	Crown	
1965	La Min Kyi Thar San Par	လမင်းကြီးသာစမ်းပါ	Please shine brightly, dear Moon	
1972	Kyunma Chit Thu	ကျွန်မချစ်သူ	My Lover	
1995	Mya Kyar Phyu	မြကြာဖြူ	White Lotus	Winner : Myanmar National Literature Award for Fiction
1998	Banya Shein	ဗညားရှိန်း	Banya Shein	
2003	Ziwa Soe San Ein	ဇီဝစိုးစံအိမ်	Cave Swiftlet's Net	Collection of author's articles after her death.

Book cover of Khin Hnin Yu's Mya Kyar Phyu (1995) features the struggle of a woman neglected by her husband, which earned the author her second National Literature Award

Most of her novels are adapted into the famous films. Her novella Pan Pan Lhwet Par (Still Wearing Flower) was made into film of the same name in 1963, starring Kawleikgyin Ne Win, Myat Lay and Kyi Kyi Htay. It was very successful, running over 25 weeks and become highest-grossing film in history of Myanmar Cinema.

== Awards ==
Khin Hnin Yu won top Myanmar National Literature Award twice.

- 1953: Popular Reader Choice (Myawaddy Magazine), Tharahpu
- 1961: Myanmar National Literature Award for Collected Short Stories, Kyemon Yeik-Thwin Wuttu-to Myar
- 1995: Myanmar National Literature Award for Fiction,Mya Kyar Phyu
