= City of Joy (1992 film) =

- Theatrical release poster
- Directed by: Roland Joffé
- Screenplay by: Mark Medoff
- Based on: City of Joy by Dominique Lapierre
- Produced by: Jake Eberts; Roland Joffé
- Starring: Patrick Swayze; Pauline Collins; Om Puri; Shabana Azmi; Art Malik
- Cinematography: Peter Biziou
- Edited by: Gerry Hambling
- Music by: Ennio Morricone
- Production companies: Lightmotive; Allied Filmmakers
- Distributed by: AMLF (France); Warner Bros. (United Kingdom)
- Release date: 15 April 1992
- Running time: 134 minutes
- Countries: France; United Kingdom
- Language: English
- Budget: $27 million
- Box office: $16 million (UK/US)

City of Joy (released in the Philippines as Raging Inferno) is a 1992 drama film directed by Roland Joffé, with a screenplay by Mark Medoff. It is based upon the novel of the same name by Dominique Lapierre, which looks at poverty in then-modern India, specifically life in the slums. The film stars Patrick Swayze, Pauline Collins, Om Puri and Shabana Azmi. The film was the second collaboration between Joffé and costume designer Judy Moorcroft.

== Plot ==
Hazari Pal is a rural farmer who moves to Calcutta with his wife Kamla and three children in search of a better life. The Pals do not get off to a good start: they are cheated out of their rent money and thrown out on the streets, and it is difficult for Hazari to find a job to support them. However, the determined family refuses to give up and eventually finds its place in the poverty-stricken city.

Meanwhile, at the other end of Calcutta, Max Lowe, a Houston surgeon distraught after the loss of a young patient, has arrived in search of spiritual enlightenment. However, he encounters misfortune as soon as he arrives. After being tricked by a young prostitute, he is roughed up by thugs and left bleeding in the street without his documents and valuable possessions.

Hazari comes to Max's aid and takes the injured doctor to the "City of Joy," a ghetto populated with lepers and poor people that becomes the Pals' new home and the American's home-away-from-home. Max spends a lot of time in the neighborhood, but he does not want to become too involved with the residents because he is afraid of becoming emotionally attached to them. However, he is soon coaxed into helping his new-found friends by a strong-willed Irish woman, who runs the local clinic.

Eventually, Max begins to fit in with his fellow slum-dwellers and become more optimistic. There are many around him whose lives are much worse, but they look on each day with a hope that gives new strength to the depressed doctor.

== Cast ==
- Patrick Swayze as Max Lowe
- Om Puri as Hazari Pal
- Pauline Collins as Joan Bethel
- Vishal Slathia as Joey Barton
- Shabana Azmi as Kamla H. Pal
- Anashua Majumdar as Selima
- Ayesha Dharker as Amrita H. Pal
- Santu Chowdhury as Shambu H. Pal
- Imran Badsah Khan as Manooj H. Pal
- Shyamanand Jalan as Mr. Ghatak, the godfather
- Rudraprasad Sengupta as Chamatkar
- Swatilekha Sengupta as Hotel Receptionist
- Anjan Dutt as Dr Sunil
- Art Malik as Ashok Ghatak
- Nabil Shaban as Anouar
- Sanjay Pathak as Shoba
- Debatosh Ghosh as Ram Chande
- Sunita Sengupta as Pormina
- Loveleen Mishra as Shanta
- Pavan Malhotra as Ashish
- Iftekhar as Hazari's father
- Chitra Sen as the angry woman
- Dipti Dave as a schoolgirl

== Shooting locations ==
City of Joy was filmed almost entirely on location in Calcutta (now Kolkata) and Howrah, West Bengal, between 9 February and 16 May 1991, making it one of the largest international feature films shot extensively in the city during the early 1990s. Director Roland Joffé deliberately avoided constructing large studio sets, instead using existing streets, neighbourhoods and public spaces to recreate the atmosphere described in Dominique Lapierre's novel. Principal photography took place across both banks of the Hooghly River, with numerous sequences filmed amid regular city traffic and daily public activity.

The production's primary setting was the slum settlement in Kolkata. While the film refers to it as being in Calcutta, the location was based on Anand Nagar in Howrah, itself inspired by the real settlement of Pilkhana, where Dominique Lapierre had conducted much of his research for the novel. Several exterior sequences featuring the Pal family, the rickshaw community and the settlement's narrow lanes were filmed in and around these neighbourhoods to preserve their visual authenticity.

The film also made extensive use of central Kolkata as an establishing backdrop. Street scenes depicting the city's distinctive transport network including hand-pulled rickshaws, yellow Ambassador taxis and Kolkata's tram system were filmed on existing roads without extensive reconstruction. Numerous tram sequences were shot on the city's operational tram network, making City of Joy one of several internationally released films to prominently feature Kolkata's trams.

Other identifiable locations appearing throughout the film include roads around the central business district, colonial-era buildings, crowded market streets, the Hooghly riverfront and railway approaches connecting Kolkata with Howrah. Several arrival and departure sequences utilise the approaches to Howrah railway station, while numerous exterior shots capture the dense urban fabric of central Kolkata, including its tram tracks, narrow commercial streets and historic architecture.

Thousands of local residents were employed as extras, particularly for crowd scenes involving markets, religious festivals and street traffic. Rather than controlling large sections of the city, many scenes were filmed amidst everyday activity, contributing to the documentary-like realism for which the film became known.

Although production records released by the filmmakers identify only "Calcutta, West Bengal" as the official filming location, film historians and location researchers have identified several recognisable landmarks appearing on screen. These include portions of the Hooghly riverfront, areas around Howrah, sections of central Kolkata's tram corridors and colonial civic districts. However, the production did not publish a comprehensive list of individual shooting sites, and many locations remain identified only through visual comparison with the finished film.

== Reception ==
City of Joy was released in France and the United Kingdom on 30 September and 2 October 1992 respectively; it was first released in the United States on 17 April 1992. In the Philippines, the film was released as Raging Inferno by First Films on 22 July 1993, with one local poster showing Swayze holding a gun.

=== Box office ===
In contrast to some of Joffe's previous successes (The Killing Fields), the film was not a box office success, even on its modest budget; The film grossed £0.8 million in the United Kingdom and $14.7 million in the United States and Canada.

=== Critical response ===
On Rotten Tomatoes the film has an approval rating of 53% based on reviews from 17 critics.

Roger Ebert of the Chicago Sun-Times gave it 3 out of 4 and wrote: "City of Joy seems a little too 'written', too conformed to the rituals of Hollywood screenplays. There's so much interesting stuff in the movie we are prepared to forgive that."

== See also ==
- 1992 in film
- List of drama films
