= Ainggyin =

Burmese form of folksong

Ainggyin (Burmese: အိုင်ချင်း, pronounced [ʔàɪɰ̃ dʑɪ́ɰ̃]) is a Burmese form of poetry which is often referred as a kind of folk-song. Ainggyins are said to be the reflections of the rural culture of Burma. Ainggyin was first started in the First Kingdom of Ava and later developed in the Nyaungyan period and continued to the Konbaung period.

The Burmese word "အိုင်" ("Aing"; pronounced [ʔàɪɰ̃]) refers to "Speaking out loud". Ainggyins are usually sung in groups by paddy transplanters.

== Format ==
There are two types of ainggyin:

- Yarpyae Ainggyins (ရာပြည့်အိုင်ချင်း) which were written circa 1100 Burma era (1738 AD), and
- Thondaunt Ainggyins (သုံးထောင့်အိုင်ချင်း) whose origin is still unknown.

Ainggyin is started with the phrase "ချစ်တဲ့သူငယ်လေ" (lit. 'To dearest friends'). Composition style is flexible.

== Notable composers and works ==
Many ainggyins in the Burmese literature world are composed by Taungdwin Shin Nyein Me whose ainggyins are prescribed in the school textbooks for students of Burmese poetry. Royal poets like Letwe Thondara and Kinwun Mingyi U Kaung also wrote some ainggyins.

The famous ainggyins include:

- Sit Hmar Tamu (စစ်မှာတစ်မူ)
- Nhama Htwe Me Ko Lo Lyin (နှမထွေးမယ့်ကိုလိုလျှင်)
- Sait Nay Myint Thu (စိတ်နေမြင့်သူ).
- Kinn Hnint Hnyinn (ကင်းနှင့်ညှင်း)

== See also ==
- Burmese literature
