= Maung Nyein Chan =

- မောင်ငြိမ်ချမ်း
- Born: Nyunt Tin; 15 June 1948; Taungoo, Pegu Division, Burma
- Died: 29 June 2010 (aged 62); North Okkalapa Township, Yangon, Myanmar
- Education: State School of Fine Arts
- Spouse: Thein Thein Htun
- Children: 1 son, 1 daughter

Maung Nyein Chan (Burmese: မောင်ငြိမ်ချမ်း, 15 June 1948 – 29 June 2010) was a Burmese comic book artist best known for a comic book series featuring a character named Sai Baydar. Throughout his career, he authored over 220 comic books and directed several films.

He was born Nyunt Tin in Taungoo, Burma to parents Maung Pu and Mya Yin. He attended the State School of Fine Art and began his career at Mandalay's Hantharwaddy newspaper. He adopted the pen name "Maung Nyein Chan" during the publication of his first comic book, Yadana Pond.

Maung Nyein Chan died on 29 June 2010 of a heart attack at the North Okkalapa Hospital.
