= Taungdwin Shin Nyein Me =

Burmese poet

- တောင်တွင်း ရှင်ငြိမ်းမယ်
- Born: Taungdwingyi
- Occupation: Poet
- Writing career
- Language: Burmese
- Genre: Ainggyin

Taungdwin Shin Nyein Me (Burmese: တောင်တွင်း ရှင်ငြိမ်းမယ်) was an early 18th century Burmese poet, best known for introducing the ainggyin, a type of Burmese folksong. She composed several ainggyins, which remain a reflection of the late Restored Toungoo (Nyaungyan) period.

== Biography ==
The name Taungdwin Shin Nyein Me was forgotten until Hsan Tun of Mandalay University rediscovered her lost works. At a monastery in Bhamo, he found a set of old parabaiks titled "Shay E-Haung-Su Meinma Hso" (ရှေး အဲဟောင်းစု မိန်းမဆို), which contained 12 ainggyins with the name of the poet: Taungdwin Shin Nyein Me.

=== Birth place ===
The Burmese literature world recognizes the birthplace of Taungdwin Shin Nyein Me as Taungdwingyi for the following reasons:

- The name Taungdwin Shin Nyein Me was stated on the parabaik discovered by Hsan Tun. The word "Taungdwin" refers to Taungdwingyi.
- One of her ainggyins contains the word "Shwedwin Thu", which can be inferred as "Girl from Golden Taungdwin".

=== Residence ===
Nyein Me may have resided in the royal capital of Inwa during the reign of Mahadhammaraza Dipadi since many of her ainggyins dealt with the general affairs of the kingdom, and the military affairs.

== Works ==
Many of her ainggyins are taught in 8th to 11th grades of the Burmese subject.

Her ainggyins are called "Yarbyae Ainggyins" (Centennial ainggyins) since the poems were written circa 1100 Burma era (AD 1738). Her works include:

- Sit Hma Tamu (စစ်မှာတမူ)
- Shwe Phi Oo Ko Khu Hle Ba (ရွှေဖီဦးကို ခူးလှည့်ပါ)
- Pan Ya Ba Lo (ပန်ရပါလို)
- Pay-phu-hlwa (ပေဖူးလွှာ)

== See also ==
- Burmese literature
- Ainggyin
