= Htin Gyi =

Burmese writer and journalist

Tekkatho Htin Gyi
- Born: 17 July 1916; Myingyan, British Burma
- Died: 1 April 2004 (aged 87); Yangon, Myanmar
- Other names: Tin Maung
- Occupation: Writer
- Known for: Southeast Asian Writers Award (2001)

Htin Gyi (Burmese: ထင်ကြီး; 17 July 1916 – 4 April 2004), also called Tekkatho Htin Gyi or Tin Maung, was a Burmese writer and journalist who spent his life studying Myanmar literature and the press. He won various honors including a National Literary Award (1992) for his history of the press in Myanmar and a Southeast Asian Writers Award (2001).

== Career ==
Htin Gyi obtained an MA in Journalism. He was the director of the Sarpay Beikan Literary Bureau from 1964 to 1976. He then was secretary of the Literary Workers’ Association from 1976 to 1981. In 1985 he was appointed to the Myanmar Language Commission on a full-time basis. In 1991 he became a part-time member of the Myanmar Historical Commission.

== Honors ==
On 11 December 1999 he represented the aged literati at a ceremony to pay respects to them at Yangon City Hall. Lieutenant-General Khin Nyunt, Secretary-l of the State Peace and Development Council, spoke at the event. He said that "literati had taken the lead in striving for the interests of the nation and the people, holding their pen; they have inspired the people to be imbued with anti-colonial sentiment and a spirit of making supreme sacrifice for the nation and the people; they were in the vanguard in safeguarding the race and religion which got bogged down in the mire during the colonial period".

After attending the presentation ceremony for the SEA Write Award for 2001 in Bangkok, Thailand, Htin Gyi returned to Myanmar on 10 October 2001. He was met at the airport by Deputy Minister for Information U Thein Sein and other senior officials. On 14 October 2001 a ceremony was held at Karaweik Palace, Kandawgyi to honor Tekkatho Htin Gyi for winning the SEA Award. Attendees included Minister for Information Major-General Kyi Aung, Deputy Minister U Thein Sein, Deputy Minister for Culture U Soe Nyunt, Chairman of Myanmar Writers and Journalists Association U Hla Myaing (Ko Hsaung) and other prominent people. Htin Gyi was Honorary Patron of the Pyinnya Tazaung magazine. After he had won the SEA Write Award, in December 2001 he was presented a prize in the Pyinnya Tazaung Literary Competition.

== Legacy ==
Htin Gyi died on 1 April 2004. His compilation of examples of English usage with the Burmese equivalent is widely used as a reference source by journalists and translators. In September 2004, the Myanmar Writers and Journalists Association decided to open a digital research library on history of Myanmar literature, to be named after Htin Gyi. The online library would provide access to the wide range of material that he had collected. It would include newspaper and magazine clippings, photographs and biographies of writers, journalists, poets and cartoonists.
