= The Fall of Paris =

1965 history book by Alistair Horne

- Author: Alistair Horne
- Subject: History of France
- Publisher: St. Martin's Press
- Publication date: 1965
- Pages: 458

The Fall of Paris: The Siege and the Commune, 1870–1871, is a 1965 history of the Paris Commune written by Alistair Horne and published by St. Martin's Press.

Horne paired rewritten chapters from The Fall of Paris with illustrations of the Commune for The Terrible Year: The Paris Commune, 1871, a coffee table book published by Viking Press for the Commune's centennial in 1971.

== Bibliography ==
- Bury, J. P. T. (1967). "Review of The Fall of Paris, The Siege and the Commune 1870-71". The English Historical Review. 82 (323): 423. ISSN 0013-8266. JSTOR 560482.
- Gersh, Gabriel (1966). "Review of The Fall of Paris: The Siege and the Commune 1870-71". The American Historical Review. 71 (4): 1363–1364. doi:10.2307/1848680. ISSN 0002-8762. JSTOR 1848680.
- Greenberg, Louis M. (1972). "Review of The Terrible Year: The Paris Commune, 1871; Louise Michel: Ou la Velleda de l'anarchie. (Leurs figures.)". The American Historical Review. 77 (4): 1135–1136. doi:10.2307/1859582. ISSN 0002-8762. JSTOR 1859582.
- Kadushin, Charles (1966). "Review of The Fall of Paris: The Siege and the Commune of 1870-71". Political Science Quarterly. 81 (4): 677–679. doi:10.2307/2146937. ISSN 0032-3195. JSTOR 2146937.
- Moody, Joseph N. (1968). "Review of The Fall of Paris, 1870-71. The Siege and the Commune". The Catholic Historical Review. 54 (3): 509–510. ISSN 0008-8080. JSTOR 25018263.
- "Review of The Fall of Paris: The Siege and the Commune: 1870-71". The Military Engineer. 58 (382): 154. 1966. ISSN 0026-3982. JSTOR 44571821.
- Rudé, George (1967). "Review of The Fall of Paris: The Siege and the Commune, 1870-71". Science & Society. 31 (2): 237–239. ISSN 0036-8237. JSTOR 40401279.
- Weber, Eugene (1966). "Review of The Fall of Paris". Current History. 50 (296): 240–247. ISSN 0011-3530. JSTOR 45311482.
- Zeldin, Theodore (1968). "Review of the Fall of Paris. The Siege and the Commune, 1870–71; France and the Dreyfus Affair". History. 53 (178): 264. ISSN 0018-2648. JSTOR 24407030.
