= Workers' College =

Coordinates: 16°49′47.95″N 96°8′7.61″E

- လုပ်သားများ ကောလိပ်
- Former name: University for Adult Education
- Motto: Education through Civil Service
- Type: public
- Established: 1948; 78 years ago
- Founder: San Shwe
- Faculty: 60
- Undergraduates: 500
- Postgraduates: none
- Location: Merchant Road; Botataung 11161, Yangon; Yangon Division, Myanmar

Workers' College (Burmese: လုပ်သားများ ကောလိပ်) was an affiliated college of Yangon University. The college, located in Botataung Township in eastern Yangon, Myanmar, offered undergraduate programs in liberal arts, sciences and law mostly to part-time students. Since 2004, the campus of Workers' College has been turned into the newly created National Management University of Myanmar.

== History ==
The college was formerly established as the University for Adult Education in 1948 to 1964 and later changed to University for the Aged, as an affiliated college of Yangon University in 1964 to 1974. It was renamed Workers' College in 1974 to 1980.

== Programs ==
Workers' College offered undergraduate degree programs leading to Bachelor of Arts (BA), Bachelor of Science (BSc), and Bachelor of Laws (LLB).

Program	Bachelor's	Master's	Doctorate
Burmese	BA		
English	BA		
Geography	BA		
History	BA		
Philosophy	BA		
Psychology	BA		
Law	LLB		
Botany	BSc		
Chemistry	BSc		
Mathematics	BSc		
Physics	BSc		
Zoology	BSc		

== Administration ==
- Department of Botany
- Department of Burmese
- Department of Chemistry
- Department of English
- Department of Geography
- Department of History
- Department of Law
- Department of Mathematics
- Department of Philosophy
- Department of Physics
- Department of Psychology
- Department of Zoology

== Campus ==
- Administrative Building
- Convocation Hall
- Laboratory Building

== Notable alumni ==
- Aung Kyi, Major-General (Retd.), Minister for Labour Affairs ( Oct 2007- )
