= Chuu Wai =

Painter from Myanmar

- ခြူးဝေ
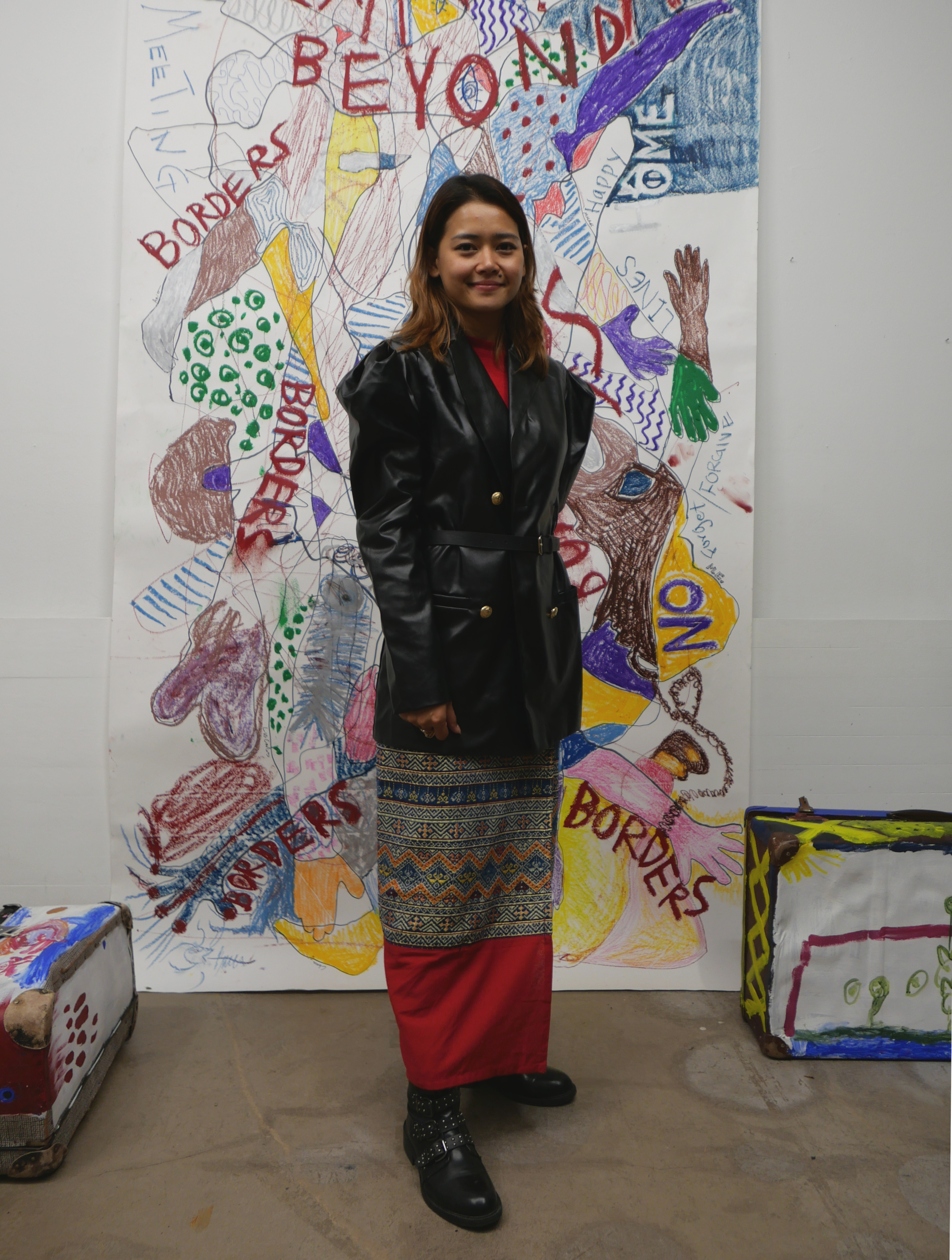
- Chuu wai in 2022 at the Espace Kugler in Geneva, Switzerland
- Born: Chuu Wai; 1992 (age 33–34); Yatsaut, Shan State
- Education: Studies under artists U Chit Thaw(Myingyan), U Khin Maung San (Mandalay), U Suu Myint Thein (Alin-Dagar Art School), U Nay San (Amar-Pura), U Win Pe Myint, Justice Art, Nation University of Art and Culture (Mandalay)
- Known for: Painter
- Awards: 2012 Indian Consulate painting competition, First Prize; 2013 Indian Consulate painting competition, First Prize; 2015 Goethe-Institut Scholarship to attend “Curator Lab”; Series in Indonesia, Germany, Thailand; 2015 Speaker at Workshop at Yangon; 2015 Speaker at Global Entrepreneurship week

Chuu Wai Nyein (Burmese: ခြူးဝေငြိမ်း; born 1992 in Yatsaut, Shan State) is a painter, performance artist and activist from Myanmar who has lived in exile in Paris following the 2021 Myanmar coup d'état.

== Early life and education ==
Chuu first graduated with a bachelor's degree in IT Engineering Technological University, Mandalay, she then earned a Postgraduate Diploma in Art, National University of Art and Culture, Mandalay. She studied under U Chit Thaw (Myingyan), U Khin Maung San (Mandalay), U Suu Myint Thein (Alin-Dagar Art School), U Nay San (Amar-Pura), U Win Pe Myint, Justice Art, Nation University of Art, Culture (Mandalay) and other.
