= Phet Sein Kun Taung Shwe Wuttu-To Mya =

2003 book by Khin Khin Htoo

Phet Sein Kun Taung
- Cover of the second edition
- Author: Khin Khin Htoo
- Original title: ဖက်စိမ်းကွမ်းတောင် ရွှေဝတ္ထုတိုများ
- Language: Burmese
- Genre: Short stories
- Publication date: 2003
- Publication place: Myanmar
- Media type: Print (paperback)
- Pages: 250 pp (second edition)
- Preceded by: San-yit Waing
- Followed by: Pa Kyut Kya

Phet Sein Kun Taung Shwe Wuttu-to Mya (Burmese: ဖက်စိမ်းကွမ်းတောင် ရွှေဝတ္ထုတိုများ, pronounced [pʰɛʔ séɪɰ̃ ɡʊ́ɰ̃ dàʊɰ̃ ʃwè wʊʔtʰṵ dò mjá]) is a 2003 collection of 15 short stories by Khin Khin Htoo. It won the Myanmar National Literature Award for Collected Short Stories for 2003. All these short stories have been printed in Shwe Amyutei Magazine.

The stories are about the lives of rural Burmese people and culture.

== The Stories ==
No .	Story	Burmese name	English
1	Kya	ကျား	
2	Khayi Phaw	ခရီးဖော်	
3	Pon Soe Ma	ပုံဆိုးမ	Ugly Dog
4	Nghet Phan Thama	ငှက်ဖမ်းသမား	
5	Po Phalan	ပိုးဖလံ	
6	Boiler Ein Galay	ဘွိုင်လာအိမ်ကလေး	
7	Kyu	ကျူး	
8	Hna-pin-lein Kyo	နှစ်မင်လိမ်ကြိုး	
9	Khan Tat	ခံတပ်	
10	A Swe Na	အစွဲနာ	
11	Kyo Tan	ကြိုးတန်း	String
12	Tha Yay Htaing	သားရေထိုင်	
13	A-Chein Hmat Naryi	အချိန်မှတ်နာရီ	Watch
14	Shwe Taing Mya Le	ရွှေတိုင်များလည်း	Brighter for More Gold
15	Khalauk Mway	ခလောက်မြွေ	Shield-tailed snake

== Trivia ==
- Her story Kyo Tan is regarded as one of the Best Short Stories of Burmese Literature during ten years by Ottayala Min.
