= Khin Swe Oo =

Burmese writer (1933–2019)

- ခင်ဆွေဦး
- Born: 1 December 1933; Sagaing, Myanmar
- Died: 27 March 2019 (aged 85)
- Education: Mandalay University
- Occupation: Writer
- Spouse: Sein Ban (စိန်ဘန်း)
- Writing career
- Notable awards: Myanmar National Literature Award (2012)

Khin Swe Oo (Burmese: ခင်ဆွေဦး, 1 December 1933 – 27 March 2019) was a Myanmar National Literature Award 's Lifetime Achievement winner. In 1961, She became well known for her first novel, Our Nation (တိုင်းဌာနီ). She has written more than 30 articles, more than 50 full-length stories and more than 200 short novels.

== Early life and education ==
She was born on 1 December 1933 in Sagaing, the daughter of author Maha Swe and Daw Kyi Kyi. She received her Bachelor of Arts degree from Mandalay University in 1956.

From 1965 to 1967 she continued her education at the University of Education and earned a degree.

== Career ==
In 1946 she began writing articles at Thandaw Sint Journal. In 1961, she made her literary debut at the age of 28 with her novel Our Nation (တိုင်းဌာနီ), for which she became well known.

In 1963, she received the Collected Short Stories Award for her novel May Peace Reign (ငြိမ်းချမ်းပါစေ). She has written more than 30 articles, more than 50 full-length stories and more than 200 short novels. Her last novel The Sagaing Daughter's Diary (စစ်ကိုင်းသမီးဒိုင်ယာရီ) was released in 2003.

She earned the Myanmar National Literature Award's Lifetime Achievement award in 2012.

== Personal life ==
In 1953, she married Sein Ban. They separated after the birth of their daughter Pearl.

== Death ==
She died on 27 March 2019.
