= Myanmar National Literature Award =

Burma National Literature Award
- Date: 1970
- Country: Myanmar

Myanmar National Literature Awards (Burmese: အမျိုးသား စာပေဆု) are awards presented to a Burmese author who has published a particularly lauded piece or body of work. There are awards for forms of writing ranging from poetry to novels. Many awards are also dedicated to a certain genre of fiction or non-fiction writing (such as science fiction or politics). Most literary awards come with a corresponding award ceremony.

== Background ==
The Myanmar National Literature Awards have been presented since 1970. They are for the best works published in the previous year in each category as determined by a selection committee from Sarpay Beikman ("Palace of Literature"), a division of the Ministry of Information that is concerned with promoting books in Burmese and other national languages. Sarpay Beikman also gives the Sarpay Beikman Manuscript Awards for unpublished works that are submitted in manuscript. In recent years the genres covered by Sarpay Beikman Manuscript and National Literary Awards have been gradually extended and the number of awards increased. As of 2007 there were twelve types of award, of which the recently instituted lifetime achievement award was the most prestigious. The awards complement the privately sponsored Sayawun Tin Shwe Award, Pakokku U Ohn Pe literary award, Thuta Swesone literary award and Tun Foundation award.

The award has been given since 1962 for distinguished work in categories that include:

- Myanmar National Literature Award for Fiction
- Myanmar National Literature Award for Collected Short Stories
- Myanmar National Literature Award for Translation
- Myanmar National Literature Award for Collected Poems
- Myanmar National Literature Award for Political Literature
- Myanmar National Literature Award for Historical Documentary
- Myanmar National Literature Award for Lifetime Achievement Award

Maung Wuntha, a member of the selection committee for the National Literary Awards and a veteran journalist died on 11 August 2013.

== List ==
=== 1972 ===
- Mya Than Tint, Translation: War and Peace

=== 1977 ===
- Kyaw Win, Novel:Nout Aww Naga
- Nu Yin, Poems
- Hla Myo Nwe, Fiction

=== 1978 ===
- Mya Than Tint, Translation: Gone with the Wind

=== 1979 ===
- Saya Zawgyi for Nin-la-hè chit dukkha (Damn You, Broken Heart) and Other Short Stories

=== 1986 ===
- Moe Moe (Inya) for Moe Moe's Short Stories
- Maung Nyein Thu for Mya Ah Phuutwe Thit Thit Waie and Youth Short Stories

=== 1987 ===
- Saya Zawgyi for Ancient Bagan and Other Poems

=== 1988 ===
- Mya Than Tint, Translation: Dream of the Red Chamber

=== 1989 ===
- Saw Mon Nyin, Myanmar Women's Clothing and Hairstyles

=== 1992 ===
National Literary Awards for 1992 were announced on 2 December 1993. They were:

Category	Author	Work
Collected Short Stories	Nay Win Myint	Hset-na-kyo
Poems	Nyunt Wai (Katha)	Seik Bya-tin kabyar-myar
General Knowledge (Arts)	Tekkatho Htin Gyi	Myanmar NaingNgan Thadinzar-mya Ahnyun (History of the press in Myanmar)
General Knowledge (Applied Science)	U Pe Thein	Hlyat-sit Pyin-nyar Thabaw-taya hnint Let-twe
Translation	Mya Than Tint	City of Joy (သုခမြို့တော်)
Children's Literature	Theikpan Soe Myint Naing	Nyi-htwelay atwet Khalay Kabyar-myar
Myanmar Culture and Arts	U Kyaw Nyein	Bagan Myohaung Myingaba Gu-byauk-gyi Paya
Belles-Lettres	Maung Hkun Nwe (Innlay)	Pa-O

No awards were made for Novels, Drama, Youth Literature, Translation (general knowledge), General Knowledge (science) or Political Literature.

=== 1995 ===
Category	Author	Work
Fiction	Khin Hnin Yu	Mya Kyar Phyu မြကြာဖြူ White Lotus
Translation	Mya Than Tint	Beyond Love (အချစ်မိုးကောင်းကင်)

Fiction|| Saya Pe Myint ||

=== 2003 ===
Awards for 2003 were presented in December 2004. The Lifelong National Literary Award was won by writer Htay Maung. Other winners of National Literary Awards were Hsaung Win Lat, Khin Khin Htoo, Salin Phone Kyaw, Daw Mi Mi Lay, Maung Thit Sar, Myinmu Maung Naing Moe, Than Aung (Anyamyay), Hlaing Thin, Maung Tun Thu, Ma Kyan, Kyaw Oo, Naing Shwe Moe, Kyu Kyu Thin and Dr Ma Tin Win.

=== 2005 ===
Award winners in 2005 were:

Category	Author	Work
Lifetime Achievement	Daw Yin Yin (Saw Monnyin)	
Novel	Hsinbyukyun Aung Thein	
Collected short stories	Yin Yin Nu (Mandalay)	
Belles-letters	Maung Moe Yan	
Myanmar culture and fine arts literature	Minshin Aung (Twantay)	
Child literature	Tin Lin Zaw	
Translation	Nan Mya Kay Khine	
General knowledge (arts)	Ma Kyan	
General knowledge (science)	Aye Kyaw	
Political	Pe Thein Tin (ambassador)	

=== 2007 ===
The 2007 award winners included:

Category	Author	Work
Lifetime achievement	Saya Hsinbyugyun Aung Thein	
Belles-letters	Tekkatho Sein Tin	Biography of Grandma U Zun
Youth Literature	Linkaryikyaw	Voice of a crane's flapping (Kyokyar Taungpan Khathan)
Translation	Saya Tin Maung Myint	Black dream, green love, written by Henry Denker
Collected Short Stories	Nay Win Myint	

=== 2008 ===
The 2008 awards were presented at the Ministry of Information on 31 December 2009. Winners were:

Category	Author	Work
Life-Time Achievement	Sayagyi Dr Kyaw Sein	
Belle-letter	Yein Nwe Par	
Selected short stories	Kyu Kyu Thin	
Myanmar culture and fine arts literature	Myat Wai Toe (Institute of Education)	
Child literature	Yenanmye Maung Manug Kyi	
Youth literature	Kyunsinmye Saw Khet	
Translation (general knowledge)	Taw Kaung Min	
Translation (aesthetics)	Win Htut Zaw	
General knowledge (arts)	Dr Dagon	
General knowledge (science)	Dr Kyaw Tint	
General knowledge (applied science)	Aung Soe	

=== 2009 ===
The 2009 awards were presented at the hall of the Ministry of Information in Nay Pyi Taw on 31 December 2010. The Lifetime Achievement for National Literary Award was presented to Dr Khin Maung Nyunt. Other winners of literary awards were Linka Yi Kyaw, Maung Cheint, Maung Ni Win, Maung Khin Min (Danubyu), U Kyaw Than (Phekon), Min Shwe Min (Insein), Ye Tint, Ma Kyan, Pho Swe (Timber Enterprise) and U Saw Aung Hla Tun.

=== 2010 ===
2010 award winners were:

Category	Author	Work
Lifetime achievement	Dr Thaw Kaung	Many articles and ten books including From the Librarian's Window: View of Library and Manuscript Studies and Myanmar Literature (2008) and Aspects of Myanmar History and Culture (2010)
Translation (Aesthetic)	Nay Win Myint	Yekantha Kyataingaye, translation of The Glass Palace by Amitah Gosh
Collected Short Stories	Ye Shan	Budayongale (A Little Railway Station)
Collected Poems	Myinmu Maung Naing Moe	Alwan-thadin Pan-ta-khin (Melancholic News and a Bed of Flowers)
Belles-letters	Tint Swe (Pyapon)	Kyawpoeikalayko Chikalwe (A Bag Riding on Me)
Youth Literature	Tin Myint	From Shinma Mountain to Ayeyarwady
Translation (General Knowledge)	Boe Hlaing	Discovery of India
General Knowledge	Dr Aung Myint Oo	Research on Language
General Knowledge (Science)	Sayagyi U Han Tun	Narathukha Treatise and Prose Treatise
General Knowledge (Applied Science)	Saw Ngu Wah (Pyinmana)	IM Bio-technological Agriculture
Political Literature	Ko Than (Kyimyindine)	The Secret Journey of a Myanmar Youth Group to the Battlefield of Vietnam
English Language	Kyaw Latt	Art and Architecture of Bagan and Historical Background

=== 2011 ===
2011 award winners were:

Category	Author	Work
Lifetime achievement	Min Yu Wai	
Translation (Aesthetic)	Tin Maung Myint	Myaw translation of Waiting by Ha Jin
Translation (General Knowledge)	U Kyi Myint (Lathar)	
Collected Short Stories	Ye Myat Tin	
Collected Poems	Pyinmana Maung Ni Thin	
Belles-letters	Kaythipan U Hla Myint	
Translation (General Knowledge)	U Kyi Myint	
General Knowledge (Art)	Dr U Win Naing	
General Knowledge (Science)	Khin Maung Swe	
General Knowledge (Applied Science)	Thaung Nyunt Thit	
Political Literature	Ko Ko Maung Gyi	
English Language (General)	U Thet Tun	
Drama	U Nyein Min	Tapin Kyo Hlyin Naut Hna Pin (Two Trees Grow where One Falls Down)
Myanmar Culture and Arts	Natmauk Tun Shein	
Children's Literature	Maung Seinn Naung	

=== 2012 ===
The 2012 awards was presented at the National Theatre, Yangon on 3 December 2013. 2012 award winners were:

Category	Author	Work
Lifetime achievement	Khin Swe Oo; Aung Thin; Theikpan Hmu Tin	
Translation (Aesthetic)	Tin Maung Myint	Pyit Hume Ne Pyit Dan, translation of Crime and Punishment by Fyodor Dostoyevsky
Translation (General Knowledge)	Maung Myint Kywe	Myanmarpyi Hma Naeyet Myar, translation of Burmese Days by George Orwell
Collected Short Stories	Khin Mya Zin	Kaungkin Moe Tain Wuttu-to Mya (Clouds Over the Sky and Others Short Stories)
Collected Poems	Ko (Tekkatho)	Mya Kan Thar Kabyar Poung Chok (Mya Khan Thar Collected Poems)
Belles-letters	Dr Khin Latyar	Pae Pae Bo Let Ya (My Father, Bo Let Ya)
General Knowledge (Art)	Maung Hon Won(Kahtika)	Min Thu Wun Hint Kabyar (Min Thu Wun and His Poems)
General Knowledge (Science)	Kyaw Oo	Yae Kyi Ta Pauk
General Knowledge (Applied Science)	Dr Khin Sann Maw	Tilikesan Myar Hma Lu Ko Kuset That Taw Yawgar Myar
Political Literature	Kyaw Win	Myanmar Naing Nyan Yaw Lelar Sansit Chat (1948-1988) (Analysis on Political History of Myanmar (1948-1988))
English Language (General Knowledge)	Myint Aung	Revealing Myanmar's Past: An Anthology of Archaeological Articles
Novel	Htet Naing (Talok Myoth)	Ma Pyaw Pyit Kae Tae Sagar
Myanmar Culture and Arts	Stephen Ni Kio	Chin Yin Kyae Hmu Dalae Htone Tan
Children's Literature	Shwe Myaing Pyone Lei Maw	Aryone Oo Hmar Pu Tae Pan Nae Kalay Kabyar Myar

=== 2013 ===
The 2013 awards were presented at the National Theatre, Yangon on 22 November 2014. 2013 award winners were:

Category	Author	Work
Lifetime achievement	Dr Khin Aye (Maung Khin Min-Danubyu) Sithu U Tin Hlaing (Ledwinthar Saw Chit); U Myint Kyi (Tekkatho Myat Soe)	
Translation (General Knowledge)	Tun Tint Aung (Myanmar translator)	
Collected Short Stories	Wai (University of Economics)	
Collected Poems	Maung Lwan Naing (Sabeingon)	
Belles-letters	Maung Yint Mar (Kyaunggon)	
General Knowledge (Art)	U San Win (History Research)	
General Knowledge (Science)	Dr Kyaw Than Tun (Guangdong Medical University)	
General Knowledge (Applied Science)	Dr Ye Win Tun	
Political Literature	Thein Oo	
English Language (General Knowledge)	Ye Dway	
Novel	Naing Zaw	
Myanmar Culture and Arts	Myat Wai Toe (University of Education)	
Children's Literature	Than Aung (Anyamyay)	

== See also ==
- Burmese literature
