= Maung Nyein Thu =

Burmese writer (born 1947)

Maung Nyein Thu (Gyobingauk)
- ေမာင်ငြိမ်းသူ(ႀကို့ပင်ကောက်)
- Born: Maung Nyein Thu; 2 December 1947 (age 78); Gyobingauk, Bago Region, Myanmar
- Education: B.Sc (Psycho)
- Occupation: Writer
- Spouse: Myo Nyut
- Writing career
- Notable awards: Myanmar National Literature Award (Youth Literature )

Maung Nyein Thu (Burmese: ေမာင်ငြိမ်းသူ, 2 December 1947) is a Burmese writer who was born in the town of Gyobingauk in Myanmar. He has written about 300 novels, over 1,000 articles, and more than 30 magazine articles. He was awarded the Myanmar National Literature Award (Youth Literature) in 1986 and was the editor for multiple magazines and journals, including HtooChar Journal, Crime Scene Journal, and Crime View Journal.

== Early life and education ==
Maung Nyein Thu was born in Gyobingauk, Bago Region, Myanmar, on December 2, 1947. He is the son of U Tin Shwe (father) and Daw Hla Wine (mother) and is married to Myo Nyut. He graduated with a B.Sc (Psychology) from Mawlamyine.

== Careers ==
From 1963 to 1964, he started his literary career with the poem "Tadalae" in the magazine Yoteshin Aunglan magazine, under the pen name Maung Hnin Wai. In addition to the pen name Maung Nyein Thu (Gyobingauk), he wrote literature under other pseudonyms. He has written about 300 novels, over 1,000 articles, and more than 30 magazine articles.

In 1986, he received the Myanmar National Literature Award (Youth Literature) for Mya Ah Phuutwe Thit Thit Way and Youth Short Stories.

He served as the Editor of HtooChar journal and as an executive editor of Shwe Tha Minn Magazine. He also served as editor of the crime scene magazines Crime Scene Journal and Crime View Journal.

== Published books ==
- The Sangha Dana Dental Hospital Medical History (ဇီဝိတ ဒါန သံဃာ့ ဆေးရုံကြီး ဆေးကုသမှု သမိုင်း မှတ်တမ်)း - 1999
- Baethu Moekya Shweko lae (ဘယ်သူ မိုးကျ ရွှေကိုယ်လဲ) - 2000
- Ma kyinthang Rain nng aung sway (မကြင်သင့် ရင်နင့်အောင်ဆွေး)- 1990
- Hcawng Thinarrlai hkwng lwhaathcayhkyintaal စောင့်သိနားလည်( ခွင့်လွှတ်စေချင်တယ်)-1990
- Mone mar tainnlhoet nyhain raatlay (မုန်းမာတင်းလို့ ညှဉ်းရက်လေ)- 1990
- Yet maran taw ngyaoe parnae hko koe suupar (မျက်မာန်တော်ငြိုးပါနဲ့ ခိုကိုးသူပါ)- 1991
- Mya a hpuutway saitsait waynhang luungaalwathtumyarr (မြအဖူးတွေ သစ်သစ်ဝေနှင့် လူငယ်ဝတ္ထုများ) - 1986
- Mya a hpuutway saitsait waynhang luungaal wathtumyarr (Second time) (မြအဖူးတွေ သစ်သစ်ဝေနှင့် လူငယ်ဝတ္ထုများ)- 1988
