= Kyaw Than (politician, born 1956) =

Burmese politician

Member of the Amyotha Hluttaw
- Incumbent
- Assumed office 1 February 2016
- Constituency: Rakhine State No.10

Personal details
- Born: 7 December 1956 (age 69) Kyaukphyu, Rakhine State, Burma (Myanmar)
- Party: Rakhine National Party
- Spouse: Tin Tin Aye
- Parent(s): Phyu Kalay (father); May Mya (mother)
- Education: ten grade

Kyaw Than (Burmese: ကျော်သန်း, born 7 December 1956) is a Burmese politician who currently serves as an Amyotha Hluttaw MP for Rakhine State No. 10 Constituency. He is a member of Rakhine National Party.

== Early life and education ==
He was born on 7 December 1956 in Kyaukphyu, Rakhine State, Burma (Myanmar).

== Political career ==
He is a member of the Rakhine National Party. In the Myanmar general election, 2015, he was elected as an Amyotha Hluttaw MP and elected representative from Rakhine State No. 10 parliamentary constituency.
