= Waiting (novel) =

1999 novel by Ha Jin

- Front cover of first edition
- Author: Ha Jin
- Language: English
- Set in: Northeast China, 1963–85
- Publisher: Pantheon Books
- Publication date: 1 October 1999
- Publication place: United States
- Media type: Print (hardback & paperback)
- Pages: 320
- ISBN: 978-0-375-40653-9
- OCLC: 77547314
- Dewey Decimal: 813/.54 21
- LC Class: PS3560.I6 W34 1999

Waiting (等待) is a 1999 novel by Chinese-American author Ha Jin (哈金) which won the National Book Award the same year. It is based on a true story that Jin heard from his wife when they were visiting her family at an army hospital in China. At the hospital was an army doctor who had waited eighteen years to get a divorce so he could marry his long-time friend, a nurse.

The plot revolves around the fortunes of three people: Lin Kong, the army doctor; his wife Shuyu, whom he has never loved; and the nurse Manna Wu, his girlfriend at the hospital where he works. Beginning in 1963 and stretching over a twenty-year period, Waiting is set against the background of a changing Chinese society. It contrasts city and country life and shows the restrictions on individual freedoms that are a routine part of life under communism. But Waiting is primarily a novel of character. It presents a portrait of a decent but deeply flawed man, Lin Kong, whose life is spoiled by his inability to experience strong emotions and to love wholeheartedly.

== Plot summary ==
Army doctor Lin Kong marries Shuyu, a village woman, as decided upon by his parents. While Lin spends most of his time away from home working as a doctor in Muji City, Shuyu raises their daughter, Hua, and cares for Lin's sick parents in Goose Village. Lin feels no love for her, and once he meets Manna Wu, a nurse at the hospital, he falls in love with her and feels that he must divorce his wife. Year after year, Lin tries to divorce the woman he is embarrassed to be married to, and every year when he comes home for a few days during the holidays, he goes with her to the courthouse. Shuyu agrees to the divorce but each time a hiccup crops up at the last moment. Meanwhile, Manna is frustrated that she cannot be Lin's official wife. Though she endures for the sake of Lin, Manna receives unwanted attention for remaining unmarried, particularly by male coworkers who sexually harass her.

Lin finally succeeds in divorcing Shuyu due to a law that states that if a man and wife have been separated for 18 years, the man can divorce her without her consent. Once he lives with Manna, however, he feels unhappy with her as well, despite expecting that he will love her since they had chosen each other. After the divorce, Shuyu and their daughter move to Muji City as well. Shortly after Manna gives birth to twin sons, Lin is devastated to learn that her heart is failing and he will be left to raise his children alone. After a heated argument with Manna, Lin reflects on the foolishness of waiting for something that ultimately failed to assuage his discontent.

During this time, he realizes too late how much he relied on and failed to appreciate Shuyu's devotion to him. He goes to Shuyu, asking her to forgive him, to wait, and help him raise his children after Manna dies. Lin's visit fills Shuyu with joy, and when Hua goes over to visit Manna and the twins, she tells Lin that they will always be waiting for him.

== Reception ==
Waiting won both the National Book Award for Fiction and the PEN/Faulkner Award, was a finalist for the 2000 Pulitzer Prize, and has been lauded for its insights into life in communist China.

== Censorship ==
In June 2000, an article attacking the novel was published in a weekly publication called Chinese Reading News. The author of the article was Liu Yiqing, a professor from Beijing University. Liu accused Ha Jin of portraying China in a negative light, and claimed that he had been used by the American media to vilify China. After the publication of this article, Beijing Publishing Group, a major publishing house in China owned by the Chinese government, decided to cancel the plan to translate and publish the novel in China.

== Publication in China ==
A Simplified Chinese translation of the novel (Chinese title: 等待), translated by Jin Liang, was published in 2002 by Hunan Wenyi Publishing and in 2015 by Sichuan Wenyi Publishing.
