= Khin Khin Htoo =

Burmese writer

- ခင်ခင်ထူး
- Born: 7 December 1965 (age 60); Myingyan, Burma (မြင်းခြံ -မြန်မာ)
- Occupation: writer
- Spouse: Nay Win Myint
- Children: Phway Phway Nay Win Myint
- Writing career
- Pen name: Khin Khin Htoo
- Period: 1993 – present
- Genres: Romance, Short story
- Notable work: Phat Sein Kyun Taung Shwe Wuttu-to Mya (2002)
- Notable awards: National Literature Award (2002)

Khin Khin Htoo (Burmese: ခင်ခင်ထူး, MLCTS: khin. khin: htoo., IPA: [kʰɪ̀ɰ̃ kʰɪ̀ɰ̃ tʰú]; born 17 December 1965) is a Mandalay-based Myanmar National Literature Award winning writer. Her works are known for their coverage of the traditional Burmese culture, and beauty of Burmese people of Upper Myanmar. She is the only one daughter of the 6 siblings. She is married to Nay Win Myint, also a writer. She has a daughter named Phway Phway Nay Win Myint.

Khin Khin Htoo entered the Burmese literary scene in 1993 with the short story Pann Pan Ba Ya Ze (ပန်းပန်ပါရစေ; Please Let Me Wear the Flower). She has written over one hundred short stories and numerous articles on sports, one of her hobbies. Her novellas has been directed as films. "Kyo Tann", "Pan Kyar Wut Hmone", "Mingalar Hlae" and upcoming "Kha Mae Kyo" are films based on her novellas. She is most well known for her novel "Ma Eain Kan" (Miss Eain Kan) a suspense, true story of a beautiful woman of greed. Many people admired her as she is rated as one of the best female authors in Myanmar. Her upcoming novel "Hlay Thagyi Kadaw" (The Wife Of The Sailor) is based on the life of her parents and herself. "Kha Mae Kyo" (The Holy String)/ "Ma Eain Kan" (Miss Eain Kan)/ Pan Kyar Wut Hmone (The Moon Lotus)/ "Taw Minthamee" (The Small Town Dancer) and "Phat Sein Koon Down Shwe Wut Htu To Myar" are the best-written and most famous novellas. Her fans like her novellas as she is clear and direct writer with digestive writing. She often writes novellas about her daughter, her brothers, her parents and her town. She has gone to many countries such as UAE, China, Singapore, Malaysia and Thailand along with her literature works.

== Works ==
=== Short story collections ===
- 1999– Thanakha Pwint Wuttu-to Myar – (သနပ်ခါးပွင့် ဝတ္ထုတိုများ)
- 2001– San-yit Wine Wuttu-to Myar – (ဆံရစ်ဝိုင်း ဝတ္ထုတိုများ)
- 2002– Phat Sein Kyun Taung Shwe Wuttu-to Mya – (ဖက်စိမ်းကွမ်းတောင်ရွှေ ဝတ္ထုတိုများ)
- 2004– Myo-ka-lay Ei Kaw Phet Set-kuu (with Thiek Htin Thet) – (မြို့ကလေး၏ကော်ဖတ်စက္ကူ)
- 2006– Pa Kyut Kya Wuttu-to Myar – (ပါးကွက်ကျား ဝတ္ထုတိုများ)
- 2006– Zay Chin Taung Wuttu-to Myar – (ဈေးခြင်းတောင်း ‌ဝတ္ထုတိုများ)
- 2007– Kyar Sit Kyo Magazine Wuttu-shae Myar – (ကြာဆစ်ကြိုး ဝတ္ထုရှည်များ)
- 2007– Sapae Tin Hmae Magazine Wuttu-shae Myar (with Nay Win Myint) – (စံပယ်တင်မှဲ့ မဂ္ဂဇင်းဝတ္ထုရှည်များ)
- 2008– Poe Yi Taung Sar Magazine Wuttu-shae Myar (with Nay Win Myint) – (ပိုးရည်းတောင်စာ မဂ္ဂဇင်းဝတ္ထုရှည်များ)
- 2008 – Hlae Yin Kyawt Wuttu-to Myar – (လှည်းယဉ်ကျော့ ဝတ္ထုတိုများ)
- 2008 – Let Ywe Sin Wuttu-to Myar – (လက်ရွေးစင်ဝတ္ထုတိုများ)
- 2009 – Yet Kan Lwin Wuttu-to Myar – (ရက်ကန်းလွန်း ဝတ္ထုတိုများ)
- 2009 – Pan See Kyo Magazine Wuttu-shae Myar – (ပန်းစည်းကြိုး မဂ္ဂဇင်းဝတ္ထုရှည်များ)

=== Novella ===
- 2009 – Mingalar Hlae – (မင်္ဂလာလှည်း) (Described in (ပင်လယ်ဖြတ်တဲ့လှည်း) with Soe Bar Daing)

=== Novels ===
- 2006– Wutt Lae Taw Shwe-Pa-So Tan Htoe Lo' Kyo Mal – (ဝတ်လဲတော်ရွှေပုဆိုးတန်းထိုးလို့ကြိုမယ်)
- 2006– Anyar Thu Anyar Thar Kyun-ma Swe Myo Myar – (အညာသူအညာသား ကျမဆွေမျိုးများ)
- 2007– Ma Eain Kan (described in Shwe Amyu Te Magazine, from June 2007 to April 2010) – (မအိမ်ကံ)
- 2008– Sue Pann Khwai Thwe Bayet Hnint Pay Ywat Leik Nahtaung Sin (currently described in Mahaythi Magazine, since December 2008 ) – (ဆူးပန်းခွေသွယ်ဘယက်နှင့် ပေရွက်လိပ်နားတောင်းဆင်)
- 2009– Pann Kyar Wutt Hmone – (ပန်းကြာဝတ်မှုန်)
- 2014- Taw Minthamee

=== Non-fiction ===
- 2000– Footballer Heroes I Love – (ကျမချစ်သော ဘောလုံးသူရဲကောင်းများ)
- 2009– Pae Thin Kyauk (Anyar Dalei Ywa Dalei) – (ပဲသင်းကောက် (အညာဓလေ့၊ ရွာဓလေ့))

== Awards ==
- 2003 : Myanmar National Literature Award for Collected Short Stories for Phat Sein Kyun Taung Shwe Wuttu-to Mya.
