= City of Joy =

1985 novel by Dominique Lapierre

- Author: Dominique Lapierre
- Original title: La cité de la joie
- Translator: Kathryn Spink
- Language: French
- Publisher: Arrow
- Publication date: 1985
- Publication place: France
- English publication date: 1985
- Pages: 544
- ISBN: 0-09-914091-8

City of Joy (French: La Cité de la joie) is a 1985 novel by Dominique Lapierre. It was adapted as a film by Roland Joffé in 1992. Calcutta is nicknamed "the City of Joy" after this novel, although the slum was based on an area in its twin city of Howrah.

== Plot ==
The story revolves around the trials and tribulations of a young Polish priest, Father Stephan Kovalski (a French priest named Paul Lambert in the original French version), the hardships endured by a rickshaw puller, Hasari Pal in Calcutta (Kolkata), India, and in the second half of the book, also the experiences of a young American doctor, Max Loeb.

Father Stephan joins a religious order whose vows put them in the most hellish places on earth. He chooses not only to serve the poorest of the poor in Calcutta but also to live with them; starve with them; and, if God wills it, die with them. In the journey of Kovalski's acceptance as the Big Brother for the slum dwellers, he encounters moments of everyday miracles in the midst of appalling poverty and ignorance. The slum dwellers are ignored and exploited by wider society and the authorities of power but are not without their own prejudices. That becomes evident by their attitude towards the lepers and the continuation of the caste system.

The story also explores how the peasant farmer Hasari Pal arrives in Calcutta with his family after a drought wipes out the farming village where his family has lived for generations.

The third main character is a rich American doctor, who has just finished medical school and wants to do something with purpose before opening up his practice catering to the wealthy.

The book chronicles not only the separation of the wealthy from the poor but also the separation of the different levels of poverty, caste divisions, and the differences of the many religions living side by side in the slums. It touches on Mother Teresa and her Missionaries of Charity as well. While the book has its ups and downs, both beautiful and horrific, an overall feeling of peace and well being is achieved by the story's end. Despite facing hunger, deplorable living conditions, illness, bone-breaking work (or no work at all) and death, the people still hold on to the belief that life is precious and worth living, so much that they have named their slum Anand Nagar, which means "City of Joy".

The author has stated that the stories of the characters in the book are true and he uses many real names in his book. However, the book is considered fictional since many conversations and actions are assumed or created.

The author and his wife traveled to India many times and sometimes stay with friends in the "City of Joy". Half of the royalties from the sale of the book go towards the City of Joy Foundation, which looks after slum children in Calcutta.

== Awards ==
The book received the Christopher Award in 1986, given for creative work that exhibits the highest values of the human spirit.

== Inspiration from real life ==
The book is set in the slum of Anand Nagar, which is based on the area of Pilkhana in Howrah, West Bengal, India. The character of Stephan Kovalski is based on the life of Gaston Dayanand, a Swiss national and nurse by profession, who moved to India in 1972 and has devoted his life to improving the welfare of slum dwellers. The book also refers to Mother Teresa and the Missionaries of Charity.

== Film adaptation ==
The 1992 film adaption was directed by Roland Joffé and starred Patrick Swayze.
