= Nay Win Myint =

Burmese writer

- နေဝင်းမြင့်
- Born: Win Myint (a) Khin Maung Win; 6 February 1952 (age 74); Konzaung village, Pwintbyu Township, Magwe Division, Burma
- Other names: Win Phwe; Aung Maung
- Occupation: Writer
- Spouse: Khin Khin Htoo
- Children: Phway Phway Nay Win Myint
- Parent(s): Ba Shwe; Daw Thein
- Awards: National Literature Award (1992)(2002)(2010)

Nay Win Myint (Burmese: နေဝင်းမြင့်, born 6 February 1952) is a three time Myanmar National Literature Award-winning Burmese writer. He specialises in writing novellas and translated novels and won the Myanmar National Literature Award 3 times in 1992, 2002 and 2010. For the novels Twelve Strings (ဆယ့်နှစ်ကြိုး) in 1996, 16 Small Houses (အိမ်ကလေးဆယ့်ခြောက်လုံး) in 2002 and a translation of Amitav Ghosh's The Glass Palace (ရေကန်သာ ကြာတိုင်းအေး) in 2010. He also writes under pseudonyms such as Win Phwe (ဝင်းဖွေး) and Aung Maung (အောင်မောင်း).

== Biography ==
He was born on 6 February 1952 in Konzaung village, Pwintbyu Township, Magwe Division, Burma (Myanmar). His wife, Khin Khin Htoo, is also a renowned writer and won the same Myanmar National Literature Award for 2002. He lives with a daughter, Phway Phway Nay Win Myint.

He has struggled and he has all the experiences such as singing, working in a brick factory, giving speeches and going on a lot of tours. Nowadays he writes novels as well as give speeches at the literature talks along with other authors and his wife. Many people admired him as their teacher. He is rated as one of the best writers in Myanmar as well as around the world. He has gone to several countries such as France, USA, China, Singapore, UAE, Thailand and Malaysia for literature works. Win Myint also worked as a journalist and has increasingly focused on environmental issues.

== Awards ==
- Myanmar National Literature Award, 1992
- Myanmar National Literature Award, 2002
- Myanmar National Literature Award, 2010
