= Tatmadaw Government (1988–2011) =

1988–2011 military government of Myanmar

State Law and Order Restoration Council
- နိုင်ငံတော် ငြိမ်ဝပ်ပိပြားမှုတည်ဆောက်ရေး အဖွဲ့ နဝတ
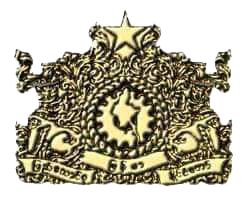
- State Seal of Myanmar (1988–2011)

Council overview
- Formed: 18 September 1988
- Preceding agencies: Council of State (as the supreme council); Pyithu Hluttaw (as the legislature)
- Dissolved: 15 November 1997
- Superseding Council: State Peace and Development Council

State Peace and Development Council
- နိုင်ငံတော် အေးချမ်းသာယာရေးနှင့်ဖွံ့ဖြိုးရေး ကောင်စီ နအဖ

Council overview
- Formed: 15 November 1997
- Preceding Council: State Law and Order Restoration Council
- Dissolved: 30 March 2011

The Tatmadaw Government (Burmese: တပ်မတော်အစိုးရ), (Note: Despite its meaning, the name "Tatmadaw Government" specifically refers to the 1988–2011 regime, distinguished from other periods of military rule.) officially the Government of the Union of Myanmar (Note: "Burma" was used instead of "Myanmar" in the English name prior to 18 June 1989.) (Burmese: ပြည်ထောင်စုမြန်မာနိုင်ငံတော်အစိုးရအဖွဲ့), was a totalitarian provisional military government that had ruled Myanmar (formerly known as Burma) since the collapse of the constitutional socialist regime in 1988 until the new constitutional government took power in 2011. Direct military rule was established on 18 September 1988 when the military junta, namely the State Law and Order Restoration Council (Burmese: နိုင်ငံတော် ငြိမ်ဝပ်ပိပြားမှု တည်ဆောက်ရေးအဖွဲ့; abbreviated SLORC or နဝတ), came into power. The SLORC was dissolved and the junta was reconstituted as the State Peace and Development Council (Burmese: နိုင်ငံတော် အေးချမ်းသာယာရေး နှင့် ဖွံ့ဖြိုးရေး ကောင်စီ; abbreviated SPDC or နအဖ) on 15 November 1997. On 30 March 2011, Senior General Than Shwe, the SPDC Chairman, signed a decree that officially dissolved the SPDC, ending the direct military rule that had lasted for more than two decades.

SLORC succeeded the Pyithu Hluttaw as a legislature and the Council of State as a ruling council, after dissolving the state organs of the Socialist Republic of the Union of Burma. When SLORC was dissolved and reconstituted as SPDC in 1997, the powerful regional military commanders, who were members of SLORC, were promoted to new positions and transferred to the capital of Yangon. The new regional military commanders were not included in the membership of the SPDC which then consisted of eleven senior military officers of the Tatmadaw, the combined military forces of the country. The members of the junta wielded a great deal more power than the cabinet ministers, who were either more-junior military officers or civilians. The exception was the Defence Ministry portfolio, which was in the hands of junta leader Senior General Than Shwe himself. On 15 September 1993, it established the Union Solidarity and Development Association, which was replaced by Union Solidarity and Development Party on 29 March 2010 in time for the elections.

Although the regime retreated from the totalitarian Burmese Way to Socialism of the Burma Socialist Programme Party when it took power in 1988, the regime was widely accused of human rights abuses. It rejected the 1990 election results and kept Aung San Suu Kyi under house arrest until her release on 13 November 2010. The way the junta handled Cyclone Nargis was also internationally criticised. The council was officially dissolved on 30 March 2011, with the inauguration of the newly elected government, led by its former member and Prime Minister, President Thein Sein.

== History ==
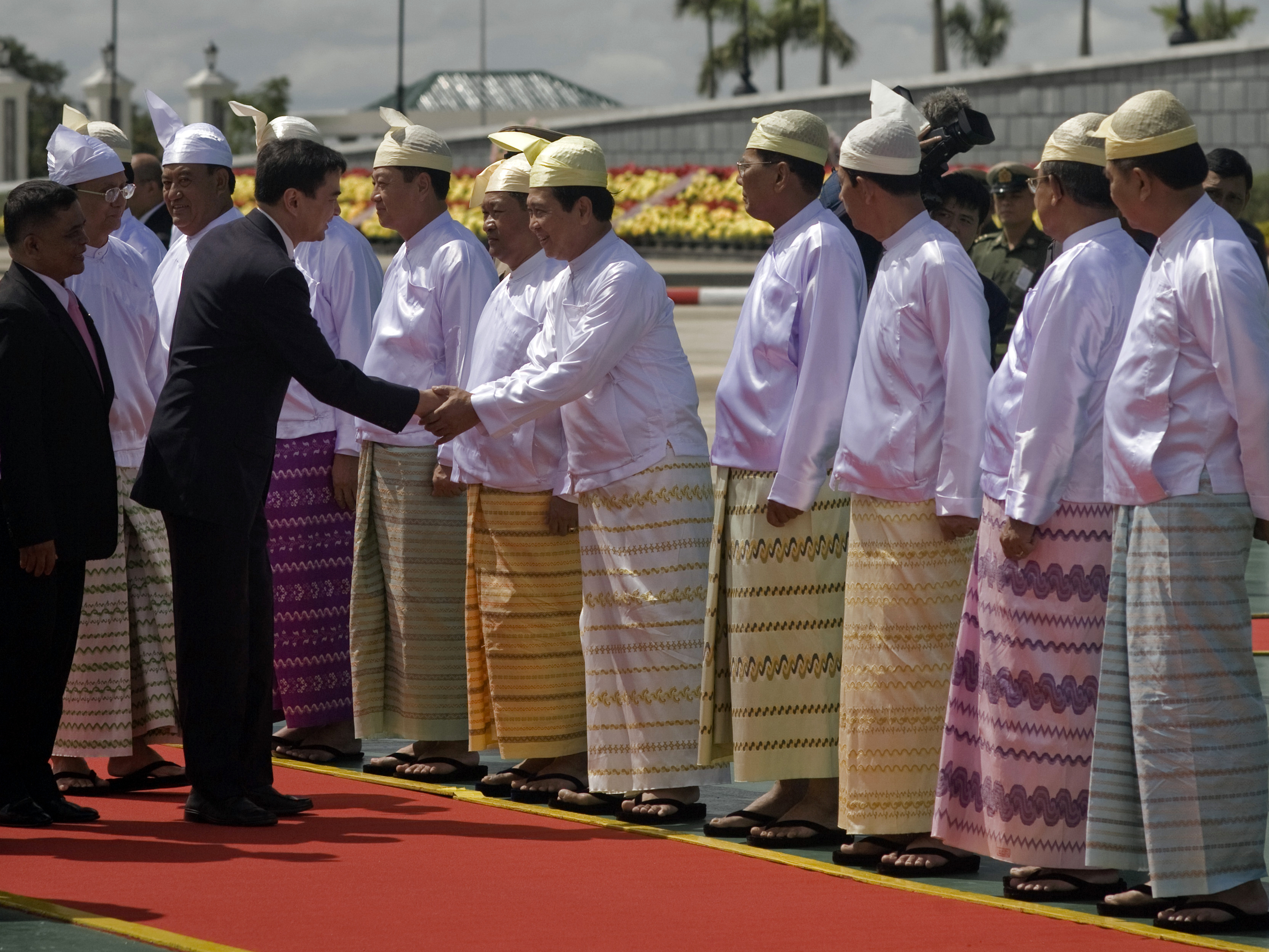
SPDC members greet Thai PM Abhisit Vejjajiva in an October 2010 visit to Naypyidaw.

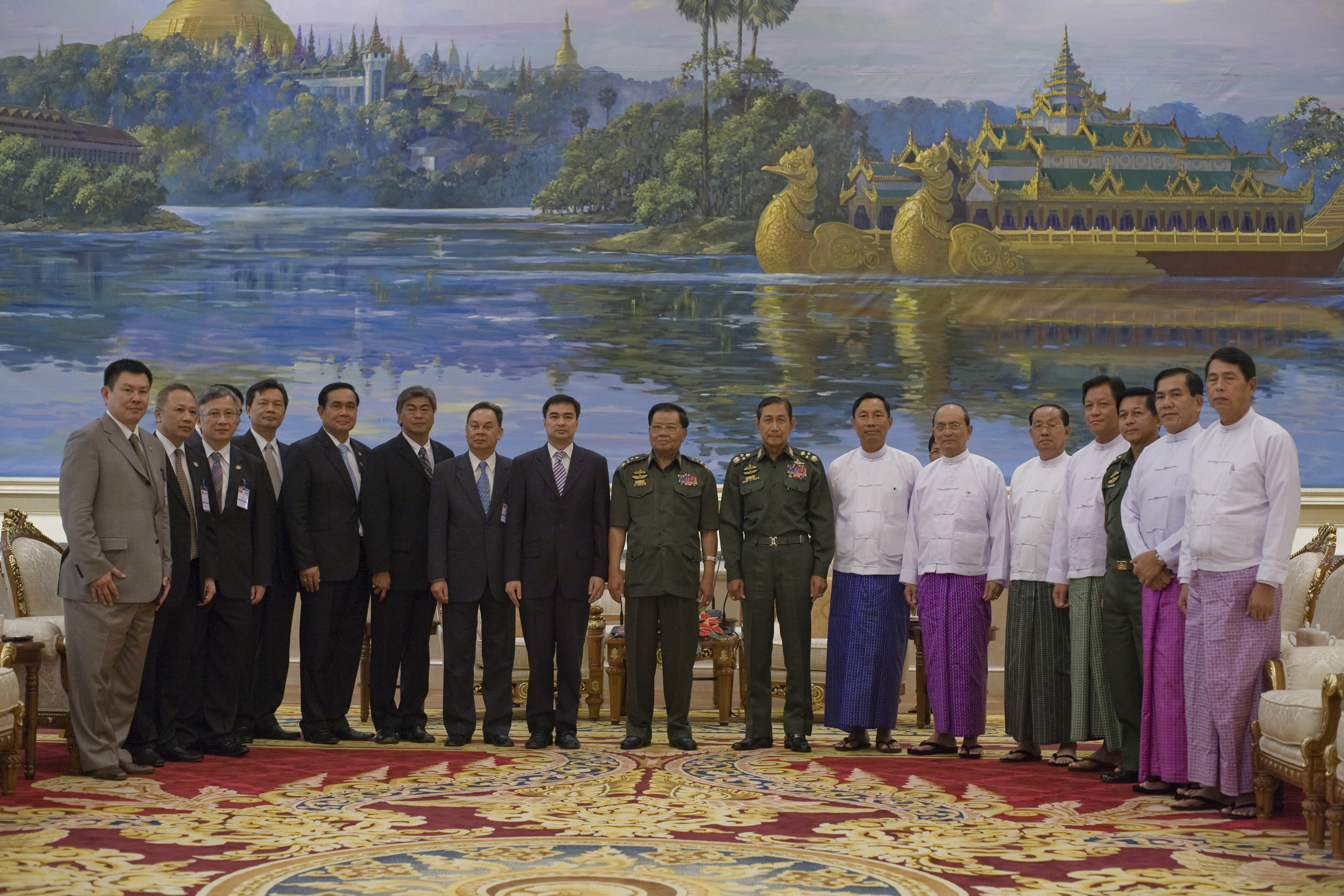
SPDC members with Thai delegation in an October 2010 visit to Naypyidaw.

The State Law and Order Restoration Council was formed when the Burmese Armed Forces, commanded by General Saw Maung (later self-promoted to Senior General Saw Maung, died July 1997), seized power on 18 September 1988 crushing the 8888 Uprising. On the day it seized power, SLORC issued Order No.1/1988 stating that the Armed Forces had taken over power and announced the formation of the SLORC. With Order No. 2/1988, the SLORC abolished all organs of state power that were formed under the 1974 Burmese constitution. The Pyithu Hluttaw (the legislature under the 1974 Constitution), the Council of Ministers (the Cabinet), the Council of People's Justices (the Judiciary), the Council of People's Attorneys (the Attorney-General Office), the Council of People's Inspectors (the Auditor-General Office), as well as the State/Region, Township, Ward/Village People's Councils were abolished.

The SLORC also stated that the services of the Deputy Ministers in the previous Burma Socialist Programme Party (BSPP) government, which it replaced, were also terminated. (Under the 1974 Burmese Constitution the Council of Ministers acted as a Cabinet but since the Deputy Ministers were not considered to be formally part of the Council of Ministers, the SLORC made sure that the Deputy Ministers, together with the Ministers' services in the previous BSPP government, from whom it had taken over power were also terminated.) The Orders that SLORC issued on the day of its takeover can be seen in the 19 September 1988 issue of The Working People's Daily. The first Chairman of SLORC was General Saw Maung, later Senior General, who was also the Prime Minister. He was removed as both Chairman of SLORC and Prime Minister on 23 April 1992 when General Than Shwe, later Senior General, took over both posts from him.

On 15 November 1997, SLORC was abolished and reconstituted as the State Peace and Development Council (SPDC). Most, but not all, members of the abolished SLORC were in the SPDC military regime.

=== Economic Policy ===
Due to the junta's repression of the 8888 Uprising, credit from Japan and West Germany was cut to the country. The government responded by announcing a new set of economic reforms that would open the country up to foreign investment. What followed was 'a crash programme of selling abroad precious natural resources, including fishery rights, gemstones, timber and oil concessions, for desperately needed revenue and foreign exchange.'

== Leadership ==
=== Chairmen ===
titles:

- 18 September 1988 – 15 November 1997 : Chairman of the State Law and Order Restoration Council
- 15 November 1997 – 30 March 2011 : Chairman of the State Peace and Development Council

Chairman			Term of office		
No.	Portrait	Name (Born–Died)	Took office	Left office	Duration
1		Senior General Saw Maung (1928–1997)	18 September 1988	23 April 1992 (deposed)	3 years, 218 days
2		Senior General Than Shwe (b. 1933)	23 April 1992	30 March 2011	18 years, 341 days

=== Vice Chairmen ===
titles:

- 18 September 1988 – 15 November 1997 : Vice Chairman of the State Law and Order Restoration Council
- 15 November 1997 – 30 March 2011 : Vice Chairman of the State Peace and Development Council

Vice-chairman			Term of office		
No.	Portrait	Name (Born–Died)	Took office	Left office	Duration
1		General Than Shwe (b. 1933)	18 September 1988	23 April 1992	3 years, 218 days
2		Vice-Senior General Maung Aye (b. 1938)	27 April 1994	30 March 2011	16 years, 337 days

== Members ==
=== SLORC ===
==== First composition ====
By the Order No. 1/1988, the State Law and Order Restoration Council was formed with the following individuals.

No.	Name	Position
1.	General Saw Maung	Chairman
2.	Lieutenant General Than Shwe	Member
3.	Major General Maung Maung Khin	Member
4.	Major General Tin Tun	Member
5.	Brigadier General Aung Ye Kyaw	Member
6.	Major General Bhone Myint	Member
7.	Major General Sein Aung	Member
8.	Major General Chit Swe	Member
9.	Brigadier General Kyaw Ba	Member
10.	Colonel Maung Thint	Member
11.	Brigadier General Maung Aye	Member
12.	Brigadier General Nyan Lin	Member
13	Brigadier General Myint Aung	Member
14	Brigadier General Mya Thin	Member
15	Brigadier General Tun Kyi	Member
16	Brigadier General Aye Thaung	Member
17	Brigadier General Myo Nyunt	Member
18	Major General Khin Nyunt	Secretary (1)
19	Colonel Tin Oo	Secretary (2)

=== SPDC ===
==== Last composition ====
Ordered by protocol:

- Senior General Than Shwe, Chairman of the SPDC, Commander-in-Chief of Defence Services
- Vice Senior General Maung Aye, Deputy Chairman of the SPDC, Deputy Commander-in-Chief of Defence Services, Commander-in-Chief (Army)
- General Thura Shwe Mann, Chief of the General Staff (Army, Navy and Air)
- General Thein Sein, Prime Minister
- General Thiha Thura Tin Aung Myint Oo, Secretary-1 of the SPDC, Former Quartermaster General and ex-Vice-president
- Major-General Ohn Myint, Chief of Bureau of Special Operation – 1 (Kachin State, Mandalay Region, Chin State, Sagaing Region)
- Lieutenant-General Min Aung Hlaing, Chief of Bureau of Special Operation – 2 (Shan State, Kayah State)
- Lieutenant-General Ko Ko, Chief of Bureau of Special Operation – 3 (Bago Region, Ayeyarwady Region)
- Lieutenant-General Tha Aye, Chief of Bureau of Special Operation – 4 (Karen State, Mon State, Tanintharyi Region)
- Lieutenant-General Myint Swe, Chief of Bureau of Special Operation – 5 (Yangon Region)
- Lieutenant-General Khin Zaw, Chief of Bureau of Special Operation −6 (Magwe Region, Rakhine State)
- Major-General Hla Htay Win, Chief of Armed Forces Training
- Lieutenant-General Tin Aye, Chief of Military Ordnance
- Lieutenant-General Thura Myint Aung, Adjutant General

== Cabinets ==
=== Soe Win's Cabinet ===
==== First Cabinet reshuffle (May 2006) ====
On 15 May 2006 the cabinet was reshuffled. The changes were:

Ministry	Changes
Culture	Major-General Kyi Aung retired Major-General Khin Aung Myint appointed
Social Welfare, Relief and Resettlement and Immigration and Population	Major-General Sein Htwa retired Major-General Maung Maung Swe appointed
Hotels and Tourism	Major-General Soe Naing appointed
Electric Power	Major-General Tin Htut reassigned Divided into two Ministries
Electric Power-1	Colonel Zaw Min appointed
Electric Power-2	Major-General Khin Maung Myint appointed
Cooperative	Colonel Zaw Min reassigned Major-General Tin Htut appointed

=== Than Shwe's Cabinet ===
==== Second Cabinet reshuffle (September 2002) ====
On 14 September 2002 a minor cabinet reshuffle was reported:

Ministry	Changes
Information	Major-General Kyi Aung reassigned Brigadier-General Kyaw Hsan appointed
Culture	Minister of Labor Tin Win, concurrently Minister of Culture since November 2001, relieved Major-General Kyi Aung appointed
Hotels and Tourism	Major-General Saw Lwin dismissed Minister of Communications, Posts and Telegraphs Brigadier-General Thein Zaw assigned concurrently
Prime Minister's Office	Major-General Tin Ngwe dismissed

==== Second Cabinet (October 1999) ====
On 30 October 1999, the State Peace and Development Council issued a proclamation replacing Ohn Gyaw with Win Aung, the Burmese ambassador to the United Kingdom.

Office	Minister
Ministry of Sports	Aung Khin
Ministry of Commerce	Pyi Son
Ministry of Social Welfare	Sein Htwa
Ministry of Religious Affairs	Aye Myint

==== Second Cabinet (November 1998) ====
On 14 November 1998, the State Peace and Development Council issued a proclamation replacing Ohn Gyaw with Win Aung, the Burmese ambassador to the United Kingdom.

Office	Predecessor	Successor
Deputy Prime Minister		Lieutenant General Tin Hla
Ministry of Foreign Affairs	Ohn Gyaw	Win Aung
Minister of the Prime Minister's Office		Tin Ngwe
Minister of Transport		Hla Myint Swe
Ministry of Industry-2		

==== Second Cabinet (December 1997) ====
On 21 December 1997, the State Peace and Development Council announced a cabinet reshuffle:

Office	Minister
Office of the Chairman of the SPDC	David Abel
Ministry of National Planning and Economic Development	Soe Tha
Ministry of Finance	Khin Maung Thein
Ministry of Communications, Posts and Telegraphs	
Ministry of Finance and Revenue	
Ministry of Energy	

==== Second Cabinet (November 1997) ====
On 15 November 1997 the State Peace and Development Council issued a proclamation naming the Prime Minister, Deputy Prime Ministers and Ministers in the government. They were:

Office	Minister
Prime Minister	Senior General Than Shwe
Deputy Prime Minister	Rear-Admiral Maung Maung Khin
Deputy Prime Minister	Lieutenant General Tin Tun
Ministry of Defence	Senior General Than Shwe
Ministry of Military Affairs	Lieutenant General Tin Hla
Ministry of Agriculture and Irrigation	Major General Nyunt Tin
Ministry of Industry-1	U Aung Thaung
Ministry of Industry-2	Major General Hla Myint Swe
Ministry of Foreign Affairs	U Ohn Gyaw
Ministry of National Planning and Economic Development	Brigadier General David Abel
Ministry of Transport	Lieutenant General Tin Ngwe
Ministry of Labour	Vice-Admiral Tin Aye
Ministry of Co-operatives	U Than Aung
Ministry of Rail Transportation	U Win Sein
Ministry of Energy	U Khin Maung Thein
Ministry of Education	U Pan Aung
Ministry of Health	Major General Ket Sein
Ministry of Trade & Commerce	Major General Kyaw Than
Ministry of Hotels & Tourism	Major General Saw Lwin
Ministry of Communications, Posts & Telegraphs	U Soe Tha
Ministry of Finance & Revenue	Brigadier-General Win Tin
Ministry of Religious Affairs	Major General Sein Htwa
Ministry of Construction	Major General Saw Tun
Ministry of Science & Technology	U Thaung
Ministry of Culture	U Aung San
Ministry of Immigration & Population	U Saw Tun
Ministry of Information	Major General Kyi Aung
Ministry of Progress of Border Areas & National Races and Development Affairs	Colonel Thein Nyunt
Ministry of Electric Power	Major General Tin Htut
Ministry of Sports	Brigadier-General Sein Win
Ministry of Forestry	U Aung Phone
Ministry of Home Affairs	Colonel Tin Hlaing
Ministry of Mines	Brigadier-General Ohn Myint
Ministry of Social Welfare, Relief & Resettlement	Brigadier-General Pyi Sone
Ministry of Livestock Breeding & Fisheries	Brigadier-General Maung Maung Thein
Office of The Chairman of The State Peace and Development Council	Lieutenant General Min Thein
Office of The Chairman of The State Peace and Development Council	Brigadier-General Maung Maung
Office of The Prime Minister	Brigadier-General Lun Maung
Office of The Prime Minister	U Than Shwe
Office of The Prime Minister	Major General Tin Ngwe

==== First Cabinet reshuffle (17 June 1995) ====
On 17 June 1995 the cabinet was reshuffled, increasing the cabinet size and the number of military people with ministerial positions:

Ministry	Changes
Construction	Khin Maung Yin reassigned to Deputy Prime Minister's office Major-General Saw Tun assigned
Light industry	Than Shwe reassigned to Prime Minister's office Major-General Kyaw Than assigned
Immigration and population	New ministry: Lieutenant-General Maung Hla appointed
Information	Brigadier-General Myo Thant reassigned to SLORC Chairman's office Major-General Aye Kyaw assigned
Social welfare, relief and resettlement	Major-General Soe Myin assigned
SLORC Chairman's office	Lieutenant-General Min Thein assigned as a minister

The outgoing Minister of Social welfare, relief and resettlement was appointed Minister of Culture, and the Minister of Culture was reassigned to the security management committee.

== Human rights abuses ==
Western non-governmental organisations, such as the Burma Campaign UK, the US Campaign for Burma, Amnesty International and Human Rights Watch have made a variety of serious accusations against the SPDC. Reports by these organisations as well as the United Nations and the Karen Human Rights Group alleged gross human rights abuses that took place in Burma under their regime, including:

- Murder and arbitrary executions
- Torture and rape
- Recruitment of child soldiers
- Forced relocations
- Forced labour
- Political imprisonment

=== Murder ===
One of the worst atrocities in Burma took place during the uprising of August 1988, when millions of Burmese marched throughout the country calling for an end to military rule. Soldiers shot hundreds of protesters and killed an estimated 3,000 people in the following weeks. During the August and September demonstrations of 2007, at least 184 protesters were shot and killed and many were tortured. Under the SPDC, the Burmese army engaged in military offensives against ethnic minority populations, committing acts that violated international humanitarian law.

=== Recruitment of child soldiers ===
It has been alleged that the SPDC forcibly recruited children – some as young as 10 – to serve in its military, the Tatmadaw. It is difficult to estimate the number of child soldiers used to serve in the Burmese army, but there were thousands, according to Human Rights Watch, the Child Soldiers Global Report 2008 and Amnesty International.

The UN Secretary-General named the SPDC in four consecutive reports for violating international standards prohibiting the recruitment and use of child soldiers.

=== Forced relocations ===
Human Rights Watch reported that since Cyclone Nargis in May 2008, the Burmese authorities expelled hundreds, if not thousands, of displaced persons from schools, monasteries, and public buildings, and encouraged them to return to their destroyed villages in the Irrawaddy Delta. The authorities emptied some public buildings and schools to use as polling stations for the 24 May referendum on a new constitution, despite pleas from United Nations Secretary-General Ban Ki-moon to postpone the referendum and focus their resources on humanitarian relief. The SPDC was alleged to have evicted people from dozens of government-operated tented relief camps in the vicinity of the former capital Yangon, ordering the residents to return to their homes, regardless of the conditions they face.

The forced evictions were part of government efforts to demonstrate that the emergency relief period was over and that the affected population was capable of rebuilding their lives without foreign aid. People who were forced from their homes by Cyclone Nargis are considered to be internally displaced persons under international law. Under the UN Guiding Principles on Internal Displacement, the Burmese government was urged to ensure the right of "internally displaced persons to return voluntarily, in safety and with dignity, to their homes or places of habitual residence, or to resettle voluntarily in another part of the country."

=== Forced labour ===
According to the International Labour Organization (ILO), despite the new quasi-civilian government taking power in Burma, forced labour continues to be widespread in Burma. It is imposed mainly by the military, for portering (that is, carrying of provisions to remote bases, or on military operations), road construction, camp construction and repair, and for a range of other tasks. In March 1997, the European Union withdrew Burma's trade privileges because of the prevalence of forced labour and other abuses. The same year, the ILO established a Commission of Inquiry to look into allegations of forced labour, coming up with a damning report the following year.

In November 2006, the International Labour Organization (ILO) announced it was to seek at the International Criminal Court "to prosecute members of the ruling Myanmar junta for crimes against humanity" over the allegations of forced labour of its citizens by the military. According to the ILO, an estimated 800,000 people are subject to forced labour in Burma.

=== Political imprisonment ===
Even before the large-scale demonstrations began in August 2007, the authorities arrested many well-known opponents of the government on political grounds, several of whom had only been released from prison several months earlier. Before the 25–29 September crackdown, more arrests of members of the opposition party National League for Democracy (NLD) took place, which critics say was a pre-emptive measure before the crackdown.

Mass round-ups occurred during the crackdown itself, and the authorities continued to arrest protesters and supporters throughout 2007. Between 3,000 and 4,000 political prisoners were detained, including children and pregnant women, 700 of whom were believed still in detention at year's end. At least 20 were charged and sentenced under anti-terrorism legislation in proceedings that did not meet international fair trial standards. Detainees and defendants were denied the right to legal counsel.

== See also ==
- State of Burma
- Panglong Agreement
- U Nu's regime
- Myanmar conflict
- 1962 Burmese coup d'etat
- Ne Win's regime
- 8888 uprising
- Military junta
- Myanmar
- 2021 Myanmar coup d'etat
- Myanmar civil war (2021-present)
