= Swe =

Swe may refer to

- SWE (disambiguation)
- Swe (name)
- Swe-Danes, Danish-Swedish jazz and entertainment trio
- Swe Fly, a Swedish airline
- SwePol, a high-voltage submarine cable between Sweden and Poland
