= Hla Myint (disambiguation) =

Hla Myint (Burmese: လှမြင့်) may also refer to:

- Hla Myint (1920–2017), Burmese economist
- Hla Myint (brigadier general) (born c. 1948), former mayor of Yangon (2011–2016), former brigadier-general in Myanmar Army
- Hla Myint Swe (minister), former Minister of Transport, Myanmar
- Hla Myint Swe (artist) (born 1948), Burmese artist
