= Swe (name) =

Name list

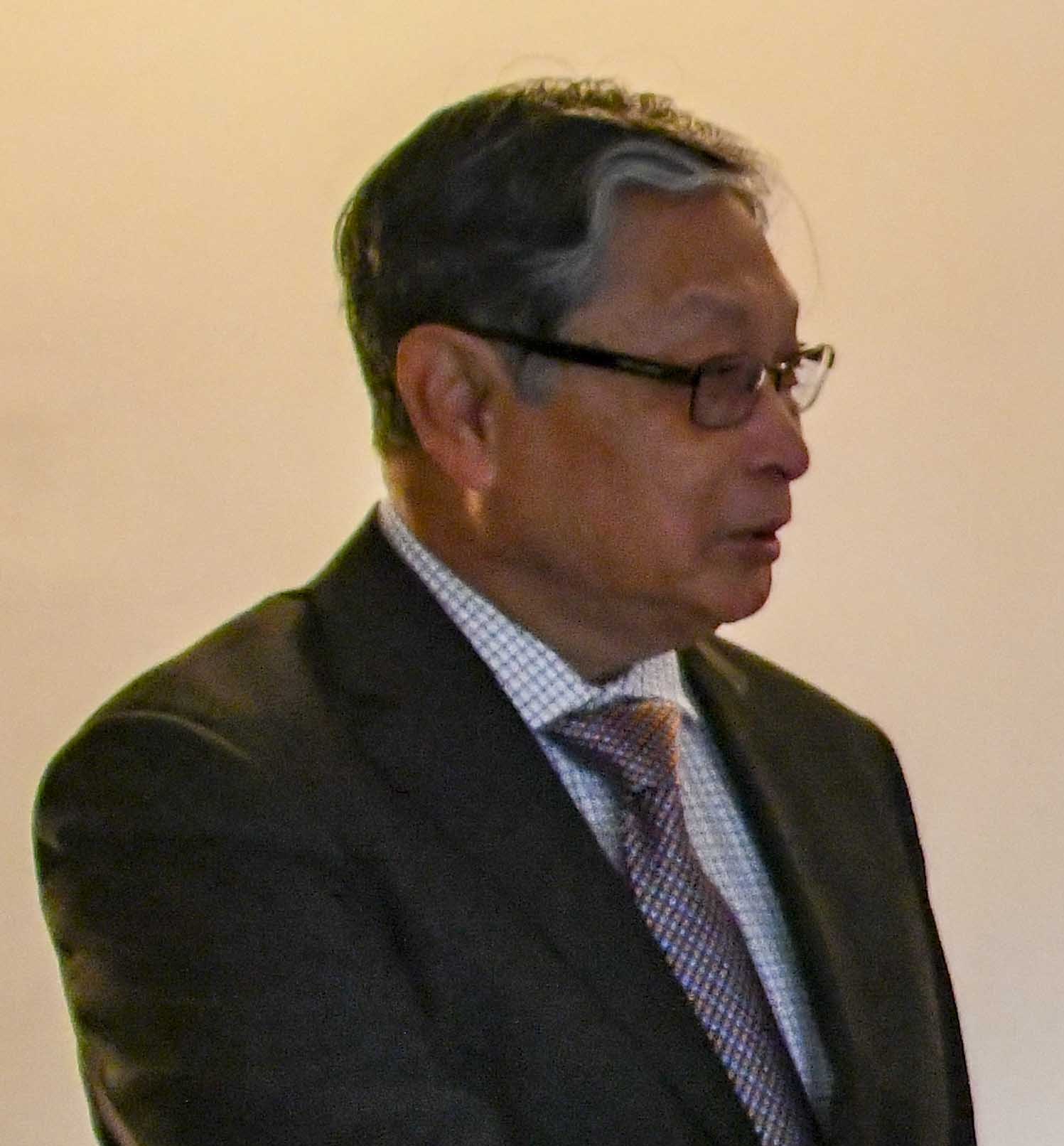
- Kyaw Tint Swe, Burmese politician
- Gender: Unisex
- Language: Burmese

Swe (Burmese: ဆွေ) is a Burmese name.

== Notable people with the name ==
- Alexandra Swe Wagner, American journalist and television host
- Ba Swe (1915–1987), second Premier of Burma
- Chit Swe, Burmese Minister for Agriculture and Forestry
- Hla Myint Swe (minister), Minister of Transport in Myanmar
- Hla Swe (politician) (born 1960), Member of Parliament at the House of Nationalities
- Hla Thein Swe, Burmese military officer
- Khin Maung Swe, Burmese politician
- Kyaw Swe (actor) (1924–1982), Burmese actor and film director
- Kyaw Swe (minister), Minister of Home Affairs of Myanmar (Burma)
- Kyaw Swe (politician), Burmese politician currently serving as a House of Nationalities MP
- Kyaw Tint Swe, (born 1945) Burmese politician
- Min Swe, Burmese politician
- Mingyi Swe (c. 1490s–1549), viceroy of Toungoo in Burma
- Myint Swe (disambiguation), multiple people
- Naing Win Swe (1940–1995), Burmese writer and poet
- Nan Nyunt Swe (1923–2010), Burmese writer
- Swe Li Myint (born 1993), Burmese middle-distance runner
- Swe Swe Win (born 1975), Burmese weightlifter
- Swe Zin Htaik (born 1953), Burmese actress
- Thein Swe, Burmese politician
- Thet Swe, Retired Burmese naval admiral and politician
- Tint Swe (disambiguation), multiple people
