= Ministry of Information (Myanmar) =

Government ministry of Myanmar

Ministry of Information, Myanmar
- ပြန်ကြားရေးဝန်ကြီးဌာန

Agency overview
- Formed: 1947
- Jurisdiction: Government of Myanmar
- Headquarters: Nay Pyi Taw
- Minister responsible: Colonel U Htein Lin (As of April 2026)
- Website: www.moi.gov.mm

The Ministry of Information (Burmese: ပြန်ကြားရေးဝန်ကြီးဌာန) is a government ministry of Myanmar that officially informs the public about government policy plans and implementation and supports improvements to knowledge and education of the public. Since the 2021 Myanmar coup d'état it has been described as responsible for the dissemination of propaganda through state-owned media.

== Organisation ==
As of 2011 the ministry consisted of:

- Minister's Office
- Myanma Radio and Television (MRTV)
- Information and Public Relations Department (IPRD)
- Printing and Publishing Department (PPD)
- News and Periodicals Enterprise (NPE)

In 2002 the ministry included these departments and also included Video Scrutinizing Committees. The Myanmar Radio and Television (MRTV) owned the MRTV and MRTV3 channels. MRTV3 was broadcasting in English. The Department of Public Relations and Psychological Welfare under the Ministry of Defence, had its own television channel, Myawaddi, and the Yangon City Development Committee also broadcast programmes from Myodaw Radio Programme. As of 2007, the News and Publishing Enterprise published the Myanmar Alin and the Kyaymon in Burmese and the New Light of Myanmar in English. On 18 November 2011, the Ministry of Information began publishing a weekly journal called the Naypyitaw Times, to report on government policies.

== Activity ==
The Ministry of Information has played an active role in ensuring that the media conform to the government's official line.

=== Television ===
Following the 2021 Myanmar coup d'état, MRTV channels have become primary sources of propaganda. Entertainment programs on these channels mainly consist of military-sponsored songs and movies.

=== Movies ===
Speaking at the Myanma Motion Picture Awards in 2002, the Minister of Information said: "The duty of Myanma film artistes is to preserve national culture and character and Myanma styles, to contribute to the flourishing of patriotism and Union Spirit and to broaden the horizons of the people. At a time when mass communication systems are spreading fast, the title of a film and the names of characters are to be chosen carefully so that they cannot be open to misinterpretation. Words to be used in the film need to be in consonance with Myanmar tradition and society. Only then will they be accepted in Myanmar society. The objectives are: To preserve and safeguard national culture through film, to contribute toward the dynamism of patriotism among the people, to organise the people to participate in building of a peaceful, modern developed nation".

=== Books ===
In 1963 the Burmese Translation Society was absorbed into the Ministry's Printing and Publishing Enterprise, and renamed Sarpay Beikman (Palace of Literature). This organisation gives out the annual Sarpay Beikman Manuscript Awards for new manuscripts and National Literature Award for books published in the previous year. Speaking at an award presentation in December 2009, Secretary-1 General Tin Aung Myint Oo said: "... Developing countries are working for their own development by laying down and implementing policies appropriate to their respective societies. However, foreign media, turning a blind eye to their achievements, are always slandering, defaming and making fabricated accusations against them. Therefore, it is a historic duty for literati to rebut the unfounded accusations of foreign media, to help the entire people to see the internal and international developments in the right perspective and to be able to march steadily on the path of national interests and to organise them with literary power for preservation and development of national culture. It is also important for literati to prevent the infiltration of alien culture and extinction of national characteristics with national literary and cultural power. And it is also necessary for them to take an active part in building a strong and united Union in line with political, economic and social objectives. ..."

=== Myanmar Times ===
The Myanmar Times was founded as a joint venture by the Australian Ross Dunkley and Sonny Swe, son of Brigadier General Thein Swe. The newspaper was semi-independent. General Thein Swe was arrested in November 2004, charged with corruption and sentenced to over 100 years in prison. Sonny Swe was arrested at the same time, charged with violating censorship laws and sentenced to 14 years in prison. Sonny Swe's wife Yamin Htin Aung took over his shares. In October 2005 the Ministry of Information was pressuring her to sell out to a buyer nominated by the state, or to risk nationalisation. The Ministry proposed that Dr Tin Tun Oo, owner of Thuta Swe publishing house, should acquire the shares. He was said to be close to the ministry. Eventually Tin Tun Oo acquired the shares. In February 2011 he was named CEO and editor-in-chief of the Myanmar-language edition of the Myanmar Times.

== Ministers ==
Ba Cho was Minister from 1946 to 1947. Ba Cho and six other cabinet ministers including Prime Minister Aung San were assassinated on 19 July 1947 in Yangon.

In October 1994 the Minister of Information was Brigadier-General Myo Thant. He gave instructions to the Video Censorship Board to increase censorship of locally-made and imported videos. He said "National culture has been badly damaged due to the easy availability of uncensored foreign video features". On 17 June 1995 Major-General Aye Kyaw replaced Brigadier-General Myo Thant as Minister of Information. Both these ministers met with the United Nations Special Rapporteur Mr. Yozo Yokota, and both evaded his requests to distribute information on International Human Rights.

On 15 November 1997 the State Peace and Development Council issued a proclamation naming the Prime Minister, Deputy Prime Ministers and Ministers in the government. Major General Kyi Aung was named Minister of Information. The poet laureate Soe Nyunt was Deputy Minister of Information from 1992 to 2003.

Brigadier-General Kyaw Hsan has been Minister from 13 September 2002. Through the SPDC's Censorship Board Kyaw Hsan suppressed any criticism of the regime, and since 2006 has taken a strong line against exile and Western media agencies. He ran in the 2010 elections and gained a seat in Pale Township, Sagaing Division, retaining his position as Minister.

On 27 August 2012 President Thein Sein announced the first major moves in a cabinet reshuffle. Kyaw Hsan was moved to the Ministry of Cooperatives, and Aung Kyi resigned his posts as minister of labour and minister of social welfare, relief and resettlement to assume the ranking position at the Ministry of Information. Aung Kyi was resigned on 29 July 2014.

Following the 2021 Myanmar coup d'état, Chit Naing became Minister of Information, but was replaced in six months by Maung Maung Ohn.
