= Tint (disambiguation) =

In color theory, a tint is the mixture of a color with white.

Tint or TINT may also refer to:

- Tint (magazine), a women's magazine from Detroit, Michigan
- T.I.N.T. (mixtape), a mixtape by Efya
- Thailand Institute of Nuclear Technology
- Tint (name)
- "Tints" (song), 2018 single by Anderson .Paak

== See also ==
- Brick tinting, the process of physically changing the color of bricks
- Film tinting, the process of adding color to black-and-white film
- Tint control, an adjustment to correct for phase error in the picture color on a NTSC television set
- Tinted windows or window film, a treatment to achieve a variety of tinting effects in windows
