= Bodybuilding in Burma =

- Country: Burma
- National team: Burma

Bodybuilding in Burma has a long history, dating back to the 1936 Summer Olympics. Burmese bodybuilders were competing internationally for the country in 2014. Myanmar Bodybuilding and Physique Sports Federation is the national governing body.

== History ==
The country's interest in weightlifting predates the 1936 Summer Olympics in Berlin where Burmese weightlifter named Zaw Weik competed at the Games, where for geopolitical reasons he was put on the Indian national team. He finished fifteenth.

In 2013, Aung Swe Naing was the country's most successful bodybuilder. He had won the Mr. Myanmar event three times, and the national fitness competition Mr. Crusher five times. Burma is scheduled to send a bodybuilding team to the 2014 Southeast Asian Games, the first time the country was to host the competition since 1969. Most of the seven person team trains at the Yangon City Development Committee Sports Centre in Yangon. The exception is Aung Swe Naing who trains at Real Fitness.

== Governance ==
Myanmar Bodybuilding and Physique Sports Federation is the sport's national governing body. The national federation is a member of the Asian Bodybuilding and Physique Sports Federation. The president is Hla Myint Swe, an artist who dislikes the sport of bodybuilding. The national training center is the Yangon City Development Committee Sports Centre.
