= Myint Swe (disambiguation) =

Myint Swe is a Burmese name and mainly refers to:

Myint Swe (1951–2025), politician who served as a vice president of Myanmar from 2016

Myint Swe may also mean:

- Bo Myint Swe, member of the Thirty Comrades
- Myint Swe, pen name of Ba Swe, 2nd Prime Minister of Burma
- Myint Swe (writer), writer and physician
- Hla Myint Swe (artist), artist, photographer and author from Myanmar
- Myint Swe (born 1965), politician and military officer

== See also ==
- Hla Myint Swe (disambiguation)
