= Kyi Aung =

- ကြည်အောင်

Minister of Information
- In office 15 November 1997 – 13 September 2002
- Preceded by: Aye Kyaw
- Succeeded by: Kyaw Hsan

Minister of Culture
- In office 13 September 2002 – 15 May 2006
- Preceded by: Tin Win
- Succeeded by: Khin Aung Myint

Military service
- Rank: Major-General

Major-General Kyi Aung (Burmese: ကြည်အောင်) was Minister of Information and Minister of Culture in Burma. He retired in May 2006.

== Military career ==
In January 1995 troops from Southern Command under Brigadier General Kyi Aung began a drive in Taungoo District to consolidate SLORC control. All villagers were to be forced into military-controlled areas, or killed if they failed to obey. In October 1995 he sent in troops with orders to destroy villages in Taungoo District and their supplies of food. He ordered Lt. Col. Aung Naing Htun to start to forcible relocation all villages. On 18 February 1996 he ordered his troops to gather villagers in Taungoo District and to set them to work clearing land mines. The troops raped one of the women. Kyi Aung was head of the South Burma Sub District (SBSD) Headquarters from 18 June 1995 until 16 November 1997, succeeding Major General Soe Myint and succeeded by Major General Tin Aye.

== Minister of Information ==
On 15 November 1997 the State Peace and Development Council issued a proclamation naming the Prime Minister, Deputy Prime Ministers and Ministers in the government. Major General Kyi Aung was named Minister of Information In December 1998 Kyi Aung attended ceremonies to hand over public buildings in Dagon Seikkan Township, Yongon Division, along with other cabinet members.

On 30 September 1999 the National League for Democracy, the main opposition party, filed lawsuits claiming "Abuse of Power" against government officials including Lieutenant-General Khin Nyunt, director-general of the National Bureau of Intelligence, Home Minister Colonel Tin Hlaing, Information Minister Major-General Kyi Aung and others. A month later a Supreme Court judge dismissed the case, declaring it invalid due to lack of evidence.

In January 2000 Major-General Kyi Aung presided over the ceremony to present motion picture awards for 1998. He noted that 15 movies had been released in 1998 compared to 30 in 1995, 25 in 1996 and just 11 in 1997. He called for production of classical movies that met international standards. The General warned against unlicensed production or distribution of videos, saying anyone who did so would be published according to the 1996 laws forbidding such activity.

== Minister of culture ==
On 13 September 2002 in a minor cabinet reshuffle Major-General Kyi Aung was moved to the Ministry of Culture, replacing U Tin Win, who had been holding this ministry as well the Ministry of Labor. His place as Minister of Information was filled by Brigadier-General Kyaw Hsan, promoted from Deputy Minister of Commerce. The writer, composer and journalist Soe Nyunt was Deputy Minister of Culture until 2003 under Major General Kyi Aung.

As Minister of Culture, Kyi Aung was named by the Council of the European Union in June 2003 as a member of the military regime who were subject to a visa ban and assets freeze. His wife Daw Khin Khin Lay was also listed. In December 2005 Kyi Aung welcomed Senior General Than Shwe when he visited the site where the palace of King Anawrahta, founder of the First Myanmar Empire, was being excavated and reconstructed.

In May 2006 Kyi Aung was "granted permission to retire". He was replaced by the former Minister of Defense, Major-General Khin Aung Myint. In May 2007 his wife was removed from the list of people against whom EU sanctions applied.
