= Hla Myint Swe =

Hla Myint Swe may refer to:

- Hla Myint Swe (minister), Minister of Transport in Myanmar
- Hla Myint Swe (artist) (born 1948), artist, photographer and author from Myanmar
