= Musik ombord =

- Directed by: Sven Lindberg
- Written by: Edvard Matz; Kerstin Matz; Lars Widding
- Starring: Alice Babs
- Cinematography: Hilding Bladh
- Release date: 23 October 1958
- Running time: 96 minutes
- Country: Sweden
- Language: Swedish

Musik ombord is a 1958 Swedish film directed by Sven Lindberg and starring Alice Babs. The film's sets were designed by the art director Nils Nilsson.

== Cast ==
- Alice Babs
- Sven Lindberg
- Lena Nyman
- Mikael Bolin
- Svend Asmussen
- Ulrik Neumann
- Lena Granhagen
- Tage Severin
- Douglas Håge
- Paul Kuhn
- Ove Tjernberg
- Rolf Johansson
- Monica Ekberg
- Erik Strandell
- Eivor Landström
- Torsten Winge
- Birgitta Tegelberg
- Siv Ericks
- John Norrman
- Synnøve Strigen
- Kotti Chave
- Ragnar Sörman
- Sten Ardenstam
- Göthe Grefbo
- Curt Löwgren
- Birger Sahlberg
- Bibi Carlo
- Lars Kühler
- Jan Tiselius
- Hilding Bladh
