= Tint Swe =

Tint Swe is a common Burmese name and may refer to:

- Kyaw Tint Swe (born 1945), incumbent Minister for the Office of the State Counsellor of Myanmar
- Tint Swe (politician, born in 1948), former Minister of National Coalition Government of the Union of Burma
- Tint Swe (minister) (born 1936), former Deputy Minister of Construction of Myanmar

== See also ==
- Swe (name)
- Tint (name)
