= Aye Kyaw =

Burmese politician

Minister of Information
- In office 17 June 1995 – 18 September 1997
- Preceded by: Brigadier-General Myo Thant
- Succeeded by: Major General Kyi Aung

Military service
- Rank: Major-General

Major-General Aye Kyaw was Minister of Information in Burma between June 1995 and September 1997.

On 17 June 1995 Major-General Aye Kyaw replaced Brigadier-General Myo Thant as Minister of Information. The poet laureate Soe Nyunt was Deputy Minister of Information throughout his term of office.

In July 1995 the Burmese opposition leader Aung San Suu Kyi was allowed to appear in public. 100 foreign reporters, photographers and cameramen drank tea and ate cakes in the garden of her Rangoon home. However, more than a dozen reporters were denied visas, apparently due to a blacklist imposed by Major-General Aye Kyaw's Ministry.

On 11 October 1995 the United Nations Special Rapporteur Mr. Yozo Yokota met with Major General Aye Kyaw and members of his Information Committee. Aye Kyaw gave information on availability of national and international publications in Myanmar. He said that the written press, radio and television were subjected to governmental control and scrutiny, saying the present conditions did not allow liberalization of the media. When asked if he would distribute publications on international human rights standards, he said there was no requirement since Buddhist publications covered most of the human rights provisions.

On 18 September 1997 the State Peace and Development Council issued a proclamation naming the Prime Minister, Deputy Prime Ministers and Ministers in the government. Major General Kyi Aung was named Minister of Information
