= Når katten er ude =

1947 film

- Directed by: Lau Lauritzen Jr. Alice O'Fredericks
- Written by: Grete Frische
- Produced by: Henning Karmark
- Starring: Karl Gustav Ahlefeldt
- Cinematography: Rudolf Frederiksen
- Edited by: Marie Ejlersen
- Release date: 14 February 1947
- Running time: 85 minutes
- Country: Denmark
- Language: Danish

Når katten er ude is a 1947 Danish family film directed by Lau Lauritzen Jr. and Alice O'Fredericks.

== Cast ==
- Karl Gustav Ahlefeldt
- Svend Asmussen as Bent
- Ludvig Brandstrup
- Rasmus Christiansen
- Ellen Feldmann
- Betty Helsengreen
- Sigurd Langberg
- Alexander Larsen
- Buster Larsen as Tyven
- Henry Madsen as Havemand
- Tao Michaëlis as Student Hansen
- Gerda Neumann as Nete
- Ulrik Neumann as Jørgen
- Marie Niedermann
- Henry Nielsen
- Bodil Steen
