= Duke Ellington's Jazz Violin Session =

Studio album by Duke Ellington
- Released: 1976
- Recorded: February 22, 1963
- Studio: Barclay, Paris
- Genre: Jazz
- Label: Atlantic

Duke Ellington chronology
The Symphonic Ellington (1963)	Duke Ellington's Jazz Violin Session (1976)	Serenade to Sweden (1963)

Duke Ellington's Jazz Violin Session is an album by American jazz pianist, composer, and bandleader Duke Ellington, recorded in 1963 but not released until 1976, on the Atlantic label. The album features members of Ellington's orchestra performing with Stéphane Grappelli and Svend Asmussen. Trumpeter Ray Nance, who was also featured in the Ellington Orchestra as a singer and a violinist, plays violin throughout the session alongside Grappelli. Asmussen, whose primary instrument was violin, plays viola throughout the session. Each of the string players is given a solo feature: Grappelli plays "In a Sentimental Mood", Asmussen plays "Don't Get Around Much Anymore", and Nance plays "Day Dream". For the remainder of the session, all three string players are featured soloing in turn.

== Reception ==
The AllMusic review by Thom Jurek stated: "The soloist and group interplay are gentle, swinging, and utterly and completely graceful and elegant. There is a lighthearted tenderness in this set that borders on sentimentality without ever going there. And the feeling is loose, relaxed, and full of warmth throughout".

Professional ratings
Review scores
Source	Rating
AllMusic	3.5/5 stars
The Rolling Stone Jazz Record Guide	4/5 stars

== Track listing ==
All music is composed by Duke Ellington except as noted.

No.	Title	Writer(s)	Length
1.	"Take the "A" Train"	Billy Strayhorn	4:22
2.	"In a Sentimental Mood"	Ellington, Manny Kurtz, Irving Mills	3:47
3.	"Don't Get Around Much Anymore"	Ellington, Bob Russell	3:58
4.	"Day Dream"	Ellington, Strayhorn, John La Touche	3:11
5.	"Cotton Tail"	Ellington, Jon Hendricks	4:39
6.	"Pretty Little One"	Strayhorn	4:25
7.	"Tricky's Licks"		3:18
8.	"Blues in C"		3:54
9.	"String Along with Strings"		6:26
10.	"Limbo Jazz"		5:25
11.	"The Feeling of Jazz"	Ellington, George T. Simon, Bobby Troup	3:22

== Personnel ==
- Duke Ellington – piano
- Stéphane Grappelli, Ray Nance – violin
- Svend Asmussen – viola
- Buster Cooper – trombone
- Russell Procope – alto saxophone
- Paul Gonsalves – tenor saxophone
- Billy Strayhorn – piano
- Ernie Shepard – bass
- Sam Woodyard – drums
