= Sein Htwa =

Burmese politician

Major general Sein Htwa

Minister of Religious Affairs
- In office 15 November 1997 – October 1999
- Succeeded by: Aung Htwe

Minister for Social Welfare, Relief and Resettlement
- In office October 1999 – May 2006
- Preceded by: Pyi Sone

Personal details
- Spouse: Khin Aye

Military service
- Allegiance: Myanmar
- Branch/service: Myanmar Army
- Years of service: –2006
- Rank: Major general

Major General Sein Htwa served as Minister of Religious Affairs, Minister for Social Welfare, Relief and Resettlement and Minister of Immigration & Population in the military government of Burma. He retired in May 2006. Between 1998 and 2002 he was Vice-Chairman of the National Convention Convening Commission. He attended Myoma High School in Yangon.

== Military career ==
In July 1995 Brigadier-General Sein Htwa was affected by a reorganization where supporters of Lieutenant-General Khin Nyunt lost power. He was removed from command of the troops of the 77 Light Infantry Division and appointed Inspector-General. On 15 November 1997 the State Law and Order Restoration Council (SLORC) was dissolved, replaced by the State Peace and Development Council (SPDC). Major General Sein Htwa was appointed the new Minister for Religious Affairs.

== Minister for Religious Affairs ==
In November 1997, as Minister for Religious Affairs Major-General Sein Htwa welcomed Secretary-1 of the State Peace and Development Council Lieutenant-General Khin Nyunt when he paid a visit to inspect renovation of the Shwedagon Pagoda. In April 1998 he attended ceremonies at Myanmar Monastery in Lumbini Park, Nepal where Ananda Theindawgyi was consecrated and the foundation laid for construction of a hostel for pilgrims. Before returning to Burma he called on the Premier of Nepal, Girija Prasad Koirala.

In September 1998 he welcomed Secretary-l Lt-Gen Khin Nyunt when he visited the International Theravada Buddhist Missionary University, and explained what was being done in preparation for opening the university. In May 1999 he was Chairman of the International Theravada Buddhist Missionary University Council. At a meeting of the council he noted that the university was new and there had been some difficulties, but they had all been overcome. In October 1999 Major-General Sein Htwa was replaced as Minister for Religious Affairs by U Aung Htwe and assumed the position of Minister for Social Welfare, Relief and Resettlement.

== Minister for Social Welfare, Relief and Resettlement ==
The third ASEAN Ministerial Meeting on Youth was held in Yangon on 2 November 2000. Major-General Sein Htwa was elected chairman. In May 2002 he led the Myanmar Delegation to the 27th Special Session on Children of the United Nations General Assembly in New York City. In June 2004 Major-General Sein Htwa attended a ceremony at Mayangon Township Fire Services Department to receive a donation of six fire engines and five ambulances by Ibaraki Prefecture of Japan.

On 26 December 2004 Myanmar was hit by a massive tsunami caused by an earthquake in the Indian Ocean. Sein Htwa visited the affected area the next day, but his ministry provided little information about what had happened. It did report that 17 villages were destroyed, 200 people made homeless and 34 killed. Aid agencies considered that these numbers were low. In January 2005 Sein Htwa accepted emergency aid of US$200,000 in cash from Chinese Ambassador Li Jinjun, representing the Chinese government. Sein Htwa said "facts have proved that China is the most friendly neighbor of Myanmar, who for long has rendered selfless help to Myanmar in all areas including political, economic and social fields". Later that month Sein Htwa attended a ceremony where Secretary-1 of the State Peace and Development Council Lt-Gen. Thein Sein received an additional donation of US$100,000 from the Chinese ambassador.

Major-General Sein Htwa's ministry was responsible for issuing permits needed by the UN World Food Programme (WFP) to distribute aid in Burma. In September 2005 the WFP reported that about 300,000 people, most of whom had been forcibly repatriated from Bangladesh refugee camps, were facing hunger and possible starvation because of unexplained delays in issuing the permits. The delays seemed to be deliberate, and to have had strategic motivations related to social and political control of the population.

On 28 November 2005 a major fire razed a slum quarter in a suburban area in Yangon, destroying 1,557 small houses made of wood and bamboo. About 9,000 were left homeless. Major-General Sein Htwa received relief materials worth about US$15,000 including clothing and medicines from the Chinese embassy and Chinese companies working in Burma, presented in a ceremony at the ministry in December 2005.

== Women Affairs ==
In July 2000 Sein Htwa was Chairman of the National Working Committee for Women Affairs (NWCWA), which had been established in July 1996. He said the committee had been making efforts to implement programs that had been advocated by the 1995 Beijing Declaration of the 4th World Conference on Women. On 26 January 2006 as Chairman of the Myanmar National Committee for Women Affairs, Major General Sein Htwa delivered the opening address at the Myanmar Women Affairs Federation (MWAF) Annual General Meeting.

== International sanctions ==
The European Union adopted a Common Position on 28 October 1996 spelling out sanctions on members of the Burma/Myanmar regime. Sein Htwa was on this list and on the revised list issued in October 2002. Major-General Sein Htwa, Minister of Immigration & Population and Minister of Social Welfare, Relief & Resettlement appeared on the April 2003 list of senior officials banned from travel in the European Union, as did his wife Khin Aye. In May 2007 Sein Htwa and his wife were deleted from the list of officials against whom European Union financial sanctions applied.
