= Soe Tha =

Burmese politician (born 1944)

- စိုးသာ
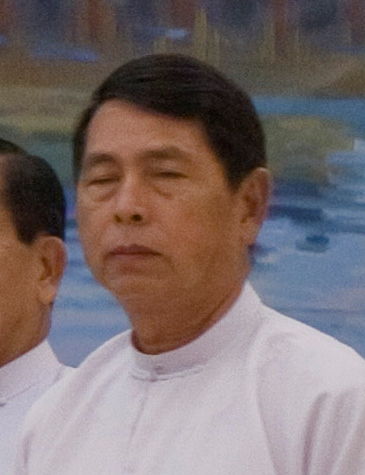
- Soe Tha in 2010

Member of the Pyithu Hluttaw
- In office 31 January 2011 – 29 January 2016
- Preceded by: None
- Succeeded by: Myint Lwin
- Constituency: Twante Township
- Majority: 74,589 (73.36%)

Minister for National Planning and Economic Development of Myanmar
- In office 20 December 1997 – 30 March 2011
- Preceded by: David Abel
- Succeeded by: Tin Naing Thein

Minister for Communications, Posts & Telegraphs of Myanmar
- In office 15 November 1997 – ?
- Succeeded by: Thein Zaw

Personal details
- Born: 7 November 1944 (age 81) British Burma
- Party: Union Solidarity and Development Party
- Spouse: Kyu Kyu Win
- Children: Aung Soe Tha, Myat Myitzu Soe, San Thida Soe, Phone Myat Soe

Soe Tha (Burmese: စိုးသာ; also spelt Soe Thar; born 7 November 1944) is a Burmese politician, previously served as a member of the Pyithu Hluttaw, the country's lower house, representing Twante Township in Yangon Region. He is a former Minister for National Planning and Economic Development.
