= Myo Thant =

- မျိုးသန့်

Minister of Information
- Succeeded by: Major-General Aye Kyaw

Military service
- Rank: Brigadier-General

Brigadier-General Myo Thant (Burmese: မျိုးသန့်) was a senior member of the military government of Burma in the 1990s, holding the position of Minister of Information.

== Minister of Information ==
On 28 May 1992 the State Law and Order Restoration Council (SLORC) named Brigadier-General Myo Thant, Minister of Information, Deputy Chairman of the Steering Committee for the Convening of the National Convention, or National Convention Convening Commission (NCCC).

In February 1993 Brigadier General Myo Thant said that the military government would only consider the release of Aung San Suu Kyi after she had served five years of house arrest. This was the longest time that anyone could be detained without charge under Myanmar law.

In October 1994 Myo Thant gave instructions to the Video Censorship Board to increase censorship of locally made and imported videos. He said "National culture has been badly damaged due to the easy availability of uncensored foreign video features". 11 November 1994, Brigadier General Myo Thant met with the United Nations' Special Rapporteur Yozo Yokota. They discussed the democratization process and the National Convention. The minister accepted copy of the Universal Declaration of Human Rights in the English language, with an unofficial translation in the Burmese language. However, he did not as agreed circulate the declaration to National Convention delegates.

== Later career ==
On 17 June 1995 Brigadier-General Myo Thant was reassigned to SLORC Chairman's office, and was replaced by Major-General Aye Kyaw as Minister of Information. On 7 December 1997 Brigadier-General Myo Thant was removed from the NCCC. Myo Thant was included in a list issued on 21 October 2002 by the European Union of members and former members of the military regime who were subject to a visa ban and freezing of funds.
