= Dublin Metropolitan University =

Unaccredited education provider in Cyprus

- Type: Private
- Established: 1998
- Vice-Chancellor: Desmond Fleming
- Location: Limassol, Cyprus
- Website: www.dmuedu.org

Dublin Metropolitan University (DMU) is a privately owned company based in Limassol, Cyprus that markets itself as a university. Desmond Fleming, vice-chancellor of the company, claims to be the 17th Baronet of Killan, a title that Burke's Peerage does not recognize. An Irish newspaper reported in March 2006 that Fleming had formerly been convicted of embezzlement.

== Affiliation structure ==
As of February 2012, the Dublin Metropolitan University website said it was "a federation of colleges and institutes which together constitute the university ... The colleges and institutes, within the DMU system offer courses leading to degrees that are awarded by DMU ... Dublin Metropolitan University does not itself own any teaching or research facilities as all teaching and research is organized by the colleges and institutions associated with the university".

== Honorary degrees ==
In May 2008 Desmond Fleming conferred an Honorary Degree of Doctor of Laws on Mohsin Ali Khan, former prince of Hyderabad, for his contribution to the purpose of peace in South Asia. The presentation was made at the Athenaeum Club, London. The Burmese poet laureate Soe Nyunt was awarded a PhD in Poetry and Composition from DMU.

== Accredited status ==
In January 2006 the Dublin Companies Registration Office in Dublin and the Department of Education and Science were discussing whether this and similar companies could be de-registered.

The commission said it was not accredited and "had not been granted authority by the CHE to collaborate with any institution in Kenya to offer any university education".
