= Rajsoomer Lallah =

Mauritian lawyer and judge (1933–2012)

Mauritius Supreme Court Justice
- In office 1980–1995

Personal details
- Born: September 1933 Mauritius
- Died: 3 June 2012 (aged 79)
- Occupation: Lawyer

Rajsoomer Lallah (September 1933 – 3 June 2012) was a Mauritian lawyer and judge who played a leading role in International Human Rights cases.

== Birth and education ==
Lallah was born in Mauritius in 1933. He was an Anderson Scholar at Balliol College, Oxford, where he studied from 1954 to 1957, graduating with a BA in jurisprudence. He went on to the Middle Temple in London, becoming a Barrister-at-Law in 1958. Returning to Oxford University he obtained an MA in 1960. Later he obtained a United Kingdom Law Officers Fellowship in 1968 and a UNITAR Fellowship at the Hague Academy of International Law in 1970.

He died in Mauritius on 3 June 2012 aged 79.

== Career ==
Lallah was made a Deputy to the Electoral Commissioner during the period leading up to independence of Mauritius in 1968. He was responsible for registering electors, drafting electoral regulations and administering the pre-independence general elections. Between 1970 and 1975 Lallah was a Special Adviser at the Commonwealth Secretariat and provided legal advice to Commonwealth Governments on resource development, taxation, negotiation with multinational companies, independence negotiations and establishing constitutions. Lallah became a Queen's Counsel in 1976 and was Assistant Solicitor General in Mauritius from 1976 to 1978. He was Parliamentary Counsel from 1978 to 1980. He was Pro Chancellor and Chairman of the Council of the University of Mauritius from 1977 to 1980.

In 1980 Lallah was appointed a Judge of the Supreme Court of Mauritius. He was Chairman of the Commission of Enquiry into the 1982 General Elections. In 1983 he was chairman of the commission that reviewed legal studies in Mauritius, causing a law school to be established at the University of Mauritius and the Council of Legal Education to be set up. From 1988 to 1994 he was Chairman of the Council of Legal Education of Mauritius. He assisted with work on a post-apartheid Constitution for South Africa in 1991. Lallah retired from the Supreme Court as Chief Justice in 1995. That year he was appointed a member of the London Court of International Arbitration.

== International human rights work ==
Lallah was elected to the United Nations Human Rights Committee on 20 September 1976. At its first session, the committee elected him as vice-chairman. He was vice-chairman until 1978, Rapporteur from 1978 to 1982 and chairman from 1989 to 1991. He served on the commission to set up the human rights machinery for the Commonwealth and on the International Commission of Jurists based in Geneva. He was involved in United Nations assessments related to human rights in Chile (1983–1984), industrial complaints in Nigeria (1990) and the genocide in Cambodia (1998).

After the resignation of Yozo Yokota, Lallah served as United Nations Special Rapporteur on Human Rights in Myanmar from June 1996 to November 2000. He reported his findings to the Commission on Human Rights and the United Nations General Assembly. Despite being repeatedly denied entry to the country, Lallah presented highly critical reports on conditions in Burma. On 26 October 2000 Lallah reported to the UN General Assembly that the Myanmar government continued to "privilege the repression of all political activity over the engagement in a genuine political dialogue". He said the military regime had ignored all UN resolutions and had made no progress in improving human rights over the past four years. Lallah resigned from the position of UN Special Rapporteur on human rights in Burma on 2 November 2000 due to lack of support from the Office of the UN High Commissioner for Human Rights.

Lallah is well known for his concurring decision (together with Martin Scheinin) in the Joslin v New Zealand, a leading case on gay marriage.

== Recognition ==
In 1980 Lallah was made an Honorary Professor of Law at the University of Mauritius. In 1985 he was given the International Gold Mercury Award ad personam for contribution to development and human rights law. He was made a Grand Officer of the Order of the Star and Key of the Indian Ocean (GOSK) in 1995.

== Selected bibliography ==
- Rajsoomer Lallah, Mauritius. Commission of Enquiry (1983). Report on the recruitment of community service workers. L.C. Achille, Govt. Printer. p. 39.
- Rajsoomer Lallah, UN. Commission on Human Rights. Special Rapporteur on the Situation of Human Rights in Chile, UN. Secretary-General (1985). Protection of human rights in Chile: note. UN. p. 58.
- Rajsoomer Lallah; Commonwealth Secretariat (1988). International human rights norms: background paper. Commonwealth Secretariat. p. 35.
- Rajsoomer Lallah, United Nations. Commission on Human Rights (1998). Situation of human rights in Myanmar: report of the Special Rapporteur, Mr. Rajsoomer Lallah. United Nations. p. 24.
