= Claus Asmussen =

Danish musician, actor and composer

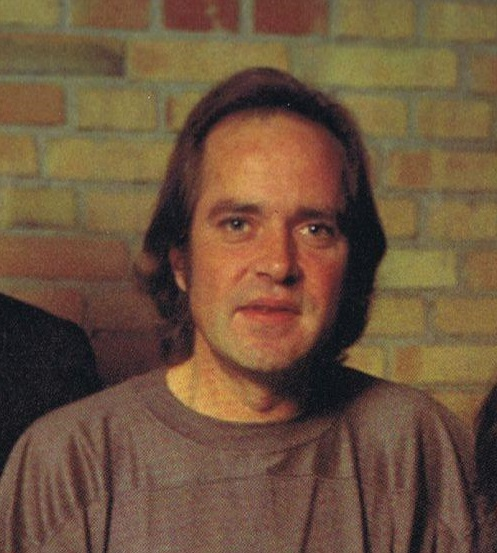

Background information
- Born: 12 February 1949 (age 76); Copenhagen, Denmark
- Occupation(s): Musician, actor, composer
- Instrument: Guitar
- Years active: 1963–present

Claus Asmussen (born 12 February 1949 in Copenhagen) is a Danish musician (guitar), actor and composer, the son of jazz violinist Svend Asmussen, and a central member of the Danish pop bands 'Emanuel D.P.', 'Sir Henry & His Butlers' (1965–80), Los Valentinos (1974–2000), 'Shu-Bi-Dua' (1974–2005), (2015-2023 Shu-bi or not Shu-bi / Shubberne).

Asmussen has not been very active on stage since 2005, but he was on a tour to Afghanistan with the other ex-Shubs, Michael Hardinger, Bosse Hall, Henning Tingleff and Klaus Poulsen, under the name Veterans, where in April 2010 they played a couple of concerts for the Danish soldiers. He runs the audio production company Audiomedia.

== Filmography ==
- 1989: Den røde tråd
- 1992: Shu-bi-dua i Tivoli
- 1993: Shu-bi-40 – Et juleeventyr (TV Special documentary short)
- 2003: Shu-bi-dua – tanketorsk eller stjerneskud?

== Discography ==
With Los Valentinos
1974-2000
With 'Sir Henry & His Butlers'

- 1967: Camp (Columbia Records)
- 1967: H2O (Parlophone)
- 1967: Sir Henry & His Butlers (Columbia Records)
- 1973: Listen! (EMI Records, Parlophone)
- 1980: Sir Henry (EMI Records)
- 1990: La' Det Gry, La' Det Gro (Polydor Records)

With 'Shu-Bi-Dua'

- 1974: Shu•bi•dua (Polydor Records), as sound engineer
- 1975: Shu•bi•dua 2 (Polydor Records)
- 1976: Shu•bi•dua 3 (Polydor Records)
- 1977: Shu•bi•dua 4 (Polydor Records)
- 1978: 78'eren (Polydor Records)
- 1979: Shu•bi•dua 6 (Polydor Records)
- 1980: Shu•bi•dua 7 (Storkophon)
- 1982: Shu•bi•dua 8 (Storkophon)
- 1982: Shu•bi•dua 9 (Balstram)
- 1983: Shu•bi•dua 10 (Balstram)
- 1985: Shu•bi•dua 11 (Hardazz I/S)
- 1987: Shu•bi•dua 12 (Shu-Bi-Dua Self-release)
- 1990: 78'eren (Elap Music)
- 1992: SShu•bi•dua 13 (Elap Music)
- 1993: Shu•bi•dua 14 (Elap Music)
- 1994: Shu•bi•40 (CMC Records)
- 1995: Shu•bi•dua 15 (CMC Records)
- 1997: Shu•bi•dua 16 (CMC Records)
- 2000: Shu•bi•dua 17 (CMC Records)
- 2001: Rap Jul & Godt Nytår (CMC Records)
- 2004: Symfo•ni•dua (CMC Records), with 'DR RadioUnderholdningsOrkestret'
- 2005: Shu•bi•dua 18 (Peaked in DEN: #2)

With 'Emanuel D.P.'

- 1976 Emanuel D.P. (Polydor Records)
