= Gerda Neumann =

Danish actress (1915–1947)

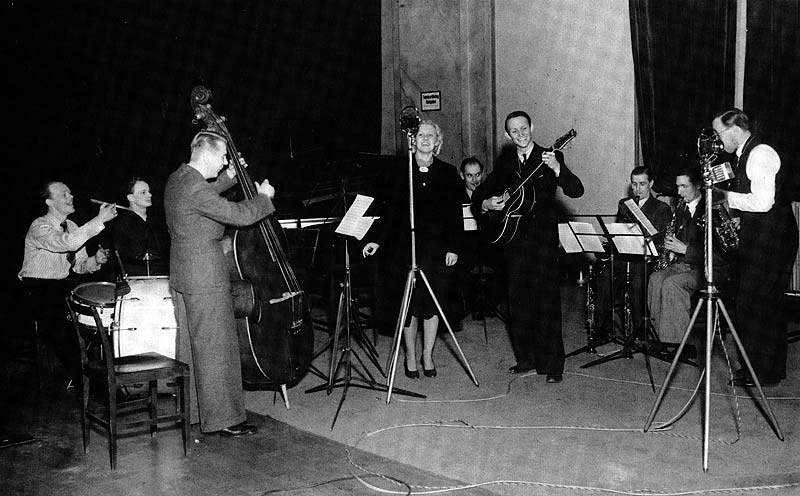
- Gerda and Ulrik Neumann (1940)
- Born: 14 December 1915; Copenhagen, Denmark
- Died: 26 January 1947 (aged 31); Copenhagen, Denmark
- Occupation: Actress
- Years active: 1936–1947

Gerda Neumann (14 December 1915 – 26 January 1947) was a Danish film actress. She appeared in nine films between 1936 and 1947. She was born in Copenhagen and died in the 1947 KLM Douglas DC-3 Copenhagen airplane crash in Copenhagen, Denmark. She was the older sister of musician Ulrik Neumann.

== Filmography ==
- Når katten er ude (1947)
- Mens sagføreren sover (1945)
- Musik i haven (1945)
- Otte hundrede akkorder (1945)
- Rejsefeber (1944)
- Op med humøret (1943)
- Frk. Vildkat (1942)
- En ganske almindelig pige (1940)
- Sun Over Denmark (1936)
