= 1947 KLM Douglas DC-3 crash =

Aviation crash in Copenhagen, Denmark

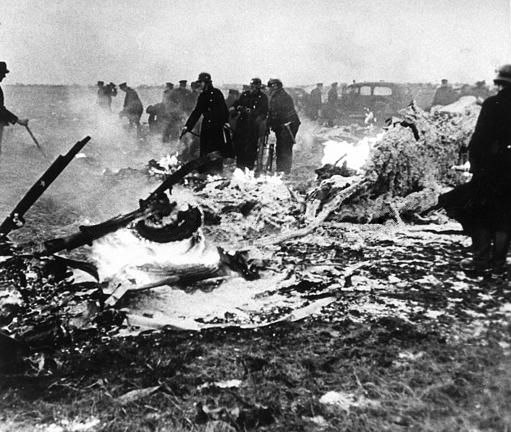
- Wreckage of the aircraft.

Accident
- Date: 26 January 1947
- Summary: Failure to properly prepare aircraft for flight
- Site: Kastrup, Denmark; 55°37′5″N 12°39′22.5″E

Aircraft
- Aircraft type: Douglas DC-3
- Operator: KLM
- Registration: PH-TCR
- Flight origin: Schiphol Airport, Amsterdam, Netherlands
- Stopover: Kastrup Airport, Copenhagen, Denmark
- Destination: Stockholm Bromma Airport, Stockholm, Sweden
- Occupants: 22
- Passengers: 16
- Crew: 6
- Fatalities: 22
- Survivors: 0

The 1947 KLM Douglas DC-3 crash refers to the crash of a KLM Royal Dutch Airlines flight from Amsterdam to Stockholm via Copenhagen on 26 January. It occurred shortly after the Douglas DC-3 took off from Kastrup Airport in Denmark. All 16 passengers and 6 crew members on board were killed.

Among those killed in the crash were Prince Gustaf Adolf of Sweden (at the time of his death, second in line to the Swedish throne), U.S. opera singer Grace Moore, and Danish actress Gerda Neumann. Prince Gustaf Adolf was the father of the present king of Sweden Carl XVI Gustaf. Moore's body was first flown to Paris on another KLM aircraft, and then to Chattanooga, Tennessee, where she was buried in the Forest Hills Cemetery, during a ceremony attended by around eight thousand people.

The probable cause of the crash was determined to be failure to remove the gust locks that had secured the aircraft's elevators while it was parked. It is still the worst aviation disaster in Denmark.

== Gallery ==
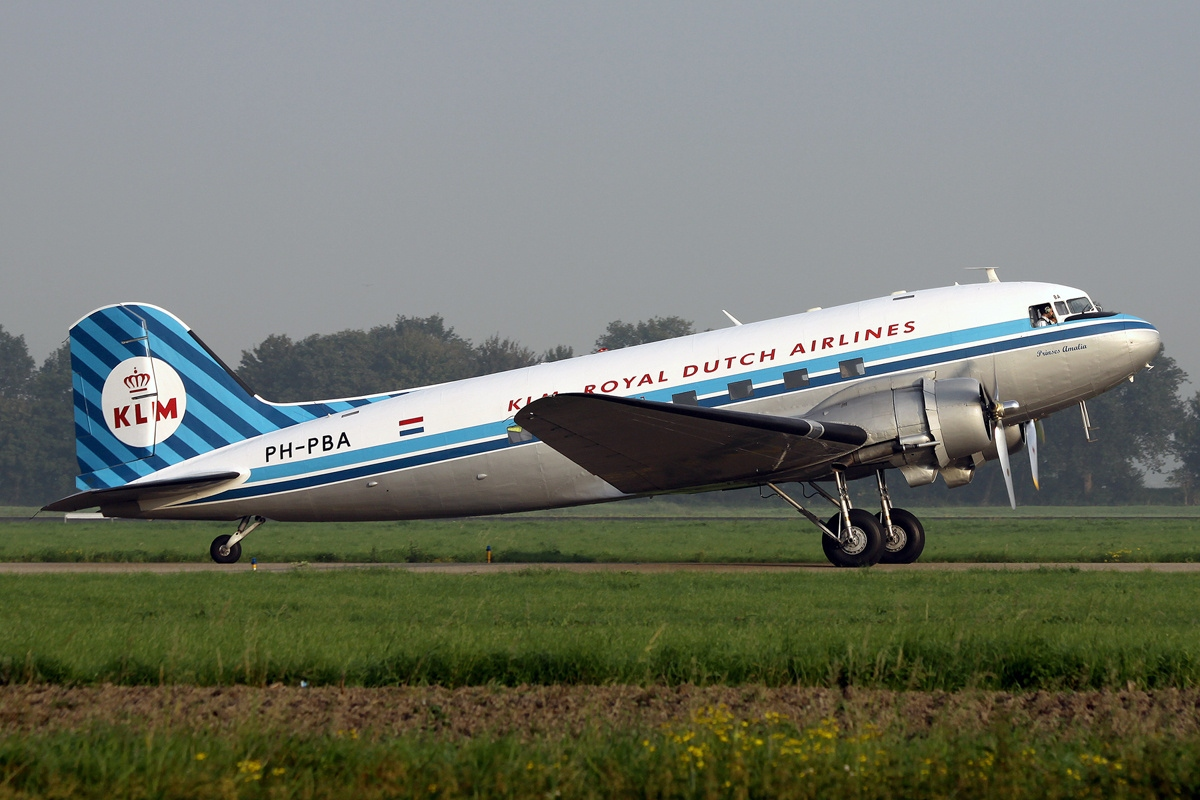
An aircraft similar to the one involved

Route map
