= Ulrik Neumann =

Danish actor (1918–1994)

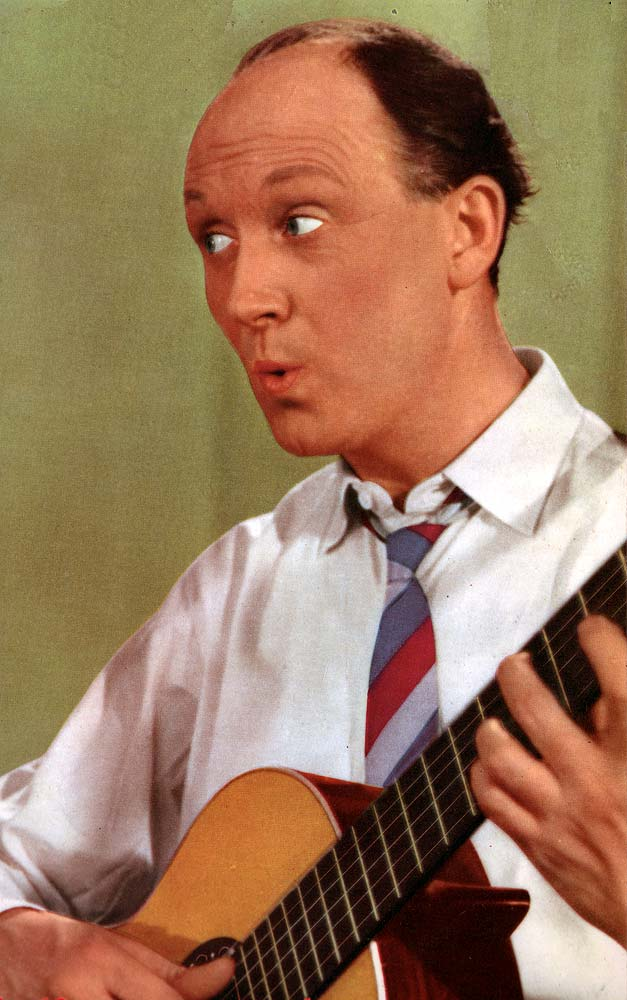
- Neumann in 1958
- Born: Hans Ulrik Neumann; 23 October 1918; Copenhagen, Denmark
- Died: 28 June 1994 (aged 75); Malmö, Sweden
- Occupations: Musician; actor
- Years active: 1940–1966
- Children: Mikael; Ulla
- Relatives: Gerda Neumann (sister)
- Musical career
- Instrument: Guitar

Ulrik Neumann (23 October 1918 – 28 June 1994) was a Danish film actor and musician. He appeared in 19 films between 1940 and 1966. Ulrik Neumann was an accomplished guitar player. From 1959 to 1961 he was a member of the trio Swe-Danes with the Swedish singer Alice Babs and the Danish jazz violinist Svend Asmussen. He was born in Copenhagen, Denmark and died in Malmö, Sweden. He was the younger brother of actress Gerda Neumann as well as the father of guitarist Mikael Neumann and singer Ulla Neumann.

== Filmography ==
- Der var engang (1966)
- Melodin som kom bort (1965)
- Ballade på Bullerborg (1959)
- Musik ombord (1958)
- Seksdagesløbet (1958)
- Kispus (1956)
- Ny og sørgelig vise (1953)
- Drömsemester (1952)
- Op og ned langs kysten (1950)
- Lattjo med Boccaccio (1949)
- Når katten er ude (1947)
- Musik i haven (1945)
- Otte hundrede akkorder (1945)
- Rejsefeber (1944)
- Det kære København (1944)
- Ebberød Bank (1943)
- Op med humøret (1943)
- En mand af betydning (1941)
- En ganske almindelig pige (1940)
