= Aung Swe Naing =

Burmese bodybuilder

- Professional bodybuilder

Personal info
- Born: Myanmar

Best statistics
- Weight: 90 kg (198 lb)

Aung Swe Naing is a three times the Mr. Myanmar event, and five times the national fitness competition Mr. Crusher winning Burmese bodybuilder. He is one of the most successful bodybuilder in Myanmar.

He grabbed the gold medal at the 2010 SEA Championships- Men Bodybuilding 80 kg and at SEA Championships 2012. He got silver medal in their 80 kg category bodybuilding contest at the SEA Games Myanmar 2013 at Myanmar Convention Centre in Yangon, Myanmar.

== Competitive placings ==
- 2013 SEA Championships (2nd- Men bodybuilder)
- 2012 SEA Championships (1st — Men Bodybuilding 90 kg)
- 2011 Asian and World Bodybuilding & Physique Sports Championships (8th — Asian Men Bodybuilding 85 kg)
- 2010 South East Asian Championships (1st — Men Bodybuilding 80 kg)
- Asian Championships for Juniors, Fitness, Women and Invitational (2nd — Men Bodybuilding Invitational)
