= Ohn Gyaw =

Burmese politician

His Excellency Ohn Gyaw
- အုန်းကျော်

16th Minister for Foreign Affairs of Myanmar
- In office 1991–1998
- Preceded by: Saw Maung
- Succeeded by: Win Aung

Deputy Minister for Foreign Affairs of Myanmar
- In office 1988–1991

Personal details
- Born: 3 March 1932 (age 94)

Ohn Gyaw (Burmese: အုန်းကျော်, pronounced [ʔóʊɰ̃ dʑɔ̀]; born 3 March 1932) is a Burmese politician who served as 16th Minister of Foreign Affairs. Ohn Gyaw joined the diplomatic service in 1951, serving in Yugoslavia, Australia, and the USSR until 1985, when he was appointed Director of the South and Southeast Asian Division of the Ministry of Foreign Affairs. In 1988, he became Deputy Minister of Foreign Affairs, and in 1991 was promoted to Minister of Foreign Affairs. In 1998 he was replaced; despite a thawing of relationships between Burma and the outside world during his tenure as Foreign Minister, Ohn Gyaw was seen as a "rigid and, at times, disingenuous champion of the regime" who "lacked innovation". He was replaced by Win Aung. He was in office when Burma won the observer position of ASEAN in July 1996 and full membership in July 1997. He played a key role in Burma becoming a member country and taking the chairmanship of it in 2014.
