= David Abel (general) =

Burmese general (1935–2019)

Brigadier-General David Abel
- ဒေးဗစ် အေဘယ်လ် BC-7086

Minister of the State Peace and Development Council Chairman's office
- In office ? – 25 August 2003

Minister for National Planning and Economic Development of Myanmar
- In office 1990s–?

Minister of Finance
- In office 1989–1992
- Preceded by: Maung Maung Khin
- Succeeded by: Win Tin

Minister of Commerce of Myanmar
- In office 1990s–?

Personal details
- Born: 28 February 1935 Insein, Burma
- Died: 18 January 2019 (aged 83)
- Spouse: Khin Thein Mu
- Relations: Alexander Abel
- Children: Aung Thiha; Cho Cho Khine
- Parent(s): Alfred T. Abel (father); Daw Chai (mother)
- Education: Royal Military Academy Sandhurst
- Occupation: Economist; military official; union minister

Military service
- Allegiance: Myanmar
- Branch/service: Myanmar Army
- Years of service: 1956–1991
- Rank: Brigadier General

David Oliver Abel (Burmese: ဒေးဗစ် အေဘယ်လ်; 28 February 1935 – 18 January 2019) was a Burmese economist, retired Brigadier General in the Myanmar Army and former cabinet minister. He served variously as Minister of Commerce, Minister of Finance and Revenue, and Minister of National Planning and Economic Development. At one time, he ran all three ministries simultaneously. He was considered the country's economic czar throughout the 1990s.

Abel retired from the State Peace and Development Council and vacated his position as the Minister of the Chairman's Office on 25 August 2003.

== Early life and education ==
Abel was born in 1935 in Insein, near Rangoon, but his family's roots were in Maymyo (now Pyin Oo Lwin). Abel's father, Alfred T. Abel was a Burma Railways engineer, while his mother Daw Chai, was a senior school teacher. Abel's father is an ethnic Indian Catholic, but he does have some Jewish ancestry. He is a Roman Catholic of mixed Anglo-Burman and Indian heritage.

Abel matriculated from Maymyo's Saint Albert's Catholic Missionary School in 1951. He then studied medicine at Mandalay College but did not complete his degree because of an ongoing insurgency in Upper Burma. He then attended the British Royal Military Academy Sandhurst (RMAS) from 1953 to 1956, graduating with an economics degree.

== Military and governmental career ==
Abel had served as the personal assistant of then-President General San Yu of the Socialist Republic of the Union of Burma. He retired the Tatmadaw in 1991 as a Director General of Procurement, with a rank of Brigadier General. Abel serving in the military, he has received many honors.

Throughout his military career, he served in various civil administration posts. He was appointed by the State Law and Order Restoration Council to serve as a cabinet minister for the Ministry of Commerce (Burma), the Ministry of Finance (Burma), Ministry of National Planning and Economic Development, and the Ministry of State Peace and Development Council's Office before retiring in 2003.

Abel was hailed as the economic architect of the country for pushing for privatisation and establishing some of the largest military-owned enterprises of the country, Union of Myanmar Economic Holdings Limited (UMEHL), Myanmar Economic Corporation (MEC) in 1990, along with 12 joint venture companies, and served as Chairman of the Myanmar Investment Commission until 1997.

Abel stood out as a member of the junta because he was media-friendly, outspoken and a member of a religious minority. He was a Roman Catholic in a junta dominated by Buddhists and before pre-publication censorship was lifted in August 2012 could only be referred to by his family name because his Christian name, “David”, was banned from publication.

== Personal life and death ==
Abel is married to Khin Thein Mu, a retired Major. They have two children, a son Aung Thiha and a daughter Cho Cho Khine. He died with heart attack at Yangon on 18 January 2019 at the age of 83.
