= Yozo Yokota =

American law professor (1940–2019)

- 横田洋三
- Born: 17 October 1940; New York City, U.S.
- Died: 12 June 2019 (aged 78)
- Occupations: Law professor; academic
- Known for: United Nations Special Rapporteur on Human Rights in Myanmar
- Spouse: Atsuko Yokota

Yozo Yokota (Japanese: 横田洋三, romanized: Yokota Yōzo; 17 October 1940 – 12 June 2019) was a professor of Law who acted as the United Nations Special Rapporteur on the Situation of Human Rights in Myanmar from 1992 to 1996.

== Academic career ==
Yozo Yokota was born in New York City, USA on 17 October 1940. He gained a Doctorate in Law from the Graduate School of Law and Politics of the University of Tokyo in 1969. He was Legal Counsel of the World Bank from 1974 to 1976.

From 1979 to 1995 he was Professor of International Law at the International Christian University in Tokyo. He was a visiting professor at the University of Adelaide in 1983, at the University of Michigan Law School in 1984 and at Columbia Law School from 1984 to 1985. From 1995 to 2001 he was Professor of International Economic Law of the University of Tokyo. He was a Professor of Law in the Faculty of Law at Chuo University, Tokyo, and Special Adviser to the Rector of United Nations University.

Yozo Yokota was involved in research into public international law, international human rights law, international economic law, law of international organisations, law of international development, United Nations studies, and Japanese foreign policy. Yokota was a member of the Japan Association of International Human Rights Law, the Japanese Association of International Law, the Japanese Association of World Law and the Association of International Economic Law. He was appointed Secretary-General of the Japan Association of United Nations Studies.

== Human rights work ==
From 1988 to 2000 Yozo Yokota was an alternate member of the UN Sub-Commission on the Prevention of Discrimination and Protection of Minorities. Between 1992 and 1996 he was the United Nations Special Rapporteur on Human Rights in Myanmar. In this role, he met with the Minister of Information Brigadier-General Myo Thant and his successor Major-General Aye Kyaw. Both evaded his requests to distribute information on International Human Rights. His reports were responsible for critical resolutions adopted by the United Nations General Assembly against the military regime in Burma. He resigned from this position in June 2006, to be replaced by Rajsoomer Lallah. His reasons were said to include career plans in Tokyo and frustration at poor support from Geneva-based human rights staff.

He was first elected to the International Commission of Jurists (ICJ) in 1996. He was a member of the ICJ's Executive Committee from 2002-2004. From 2000 to 2006 he was a member of the UN Sub-Commission on the Promotion and Protection of Human Rights.

== Death ==
Yokota died on 12 June 2019, survived by his wife, Atsuko Yokota.

== Bibliography ==
- Yozo Yokota (1989). The Twentieth Century and International Organizations (in Japanese). Institute for Basic Studies in International Relations.
- Yozo Yokota (co-author) (1999). The Law of International Organizations (in Japanese). Yuhikaku Publishing Company.
- Yozo Yokota (2001). The Legal Structure of International Organizations (in Japanese). Kokusai Shoin Publishing Company.
- Yozo Yokota (co-author) (2002). The Law of International Relations (in Japanese). Association for the Promotion of Education through the University of the Air.
- Yozo Yokota. Human Rights in Japan and in the World.
