= Khin Maung Thein =

Burmese politician

- ခင်မောင်သိန်း

Member of the Pyithu Hluttaw
- Incumbent
- Assumed office 2 May 2012
- Preceded by: Khin Maung Myint
- Constituency: Sagaing Township

Member-elect of the Pyithu Hluttaw
- Preceded by: Constituency established
- Succeeded by: Constituency abolished
- Constituency: Khin-U № 2
- Majority: 15,367 (68%)

Personal details
- Born: 3 December 1940 (age 85) Khin-U, British Burma
- Party: National League for Democracy
- Relations: Phone Maw (father)
- Education: Mandalay University
- Occupation: Politician and lawyer

Khin Maung Thein (Burmese: ခင်မောင်သိန်း) is a Burmese politician and political prisoner who currently serves as a Pyithu Hluttaw MP for Sagaing Township. In the 1990 Burmese general election, he was elected as an Pyithu Hluttaw MP, winning a majority of 15,367 (68% of the votes), but was never allowed to assume his seat.

== Early life and education ==
Khin Maung Thein was born in Khin-U, British Burma on December 3, 1940 .In 1969, he graduated from Mandalay University with a Bachelor of Science degree in chemistry. In 1983, he became a High Court advocate. In 1990, Khin Maung Thein was arrested and sentenced under the Burmese Penal Code Article 122 for attending a secret meeting in Mandalay to form a provisional civilian government and was released on 2 June 1992.

== Political career ==
He is a member of the National League for Democracy. He was elected as a Pyithu Hluttaw MP and elected representative from Sagaing Township parliamentary constituency.
