= SWE =

SWE may refer to:

== Science and technology ==
- Sensor Web Enablement, an Open Geospatial Consortium framework for defining a Sensor Web
- Shallow water equations, a set of equations that describe flow below a pressure surface
- Snow water equivalent, in snow science
- Software engineer, in both computer science and engineering
- Staebler–Wronski effect, light-induced changes in the properties of silicon

== Organisations ==
- Social Work England, the regulator for social workers in England
- Society of Women Engineers, a non-profit engineering organization
- Society of Wood Engravers, a British printmakers' group

== Other uses ==
- Something Witty Entertainment, creators of animated web series Sword Art Online Abridged
- Sweden (ISO 3166-1 alpha-3-code)
- Swedish language (ISO 639-2 and ISO 639-3 code)
