= Soe Nyunt =

Soe Nyunt(Htilar Sitthu)
- Soe Nyunt
- Born: 18 April 1932; Meiktila Township, British Burma
- Died: 2 October 2009 (aged 77); Botataung Township, Yangon, Myanmar
- Occupations: Writer, journalist
- Known for: O Withered Leaf from River Mekong
- Spouse: Hla Yin Yin Soe
- Children: Eight

U Soe Nyunt (Burmese: (ဦး)စိုးညွန့်), who used the pen-name Htilar Sitthu (Burmese: ထီလာစစ်သူ; 18 April 1932 – 2 October 2009) was a Burmese writer, composer and journalist who was appointed the Poet Laureate of Burma.

== Biography ==
Soe Nyunt was born on 18 April 1932 in Shwe Sitthi village, Meiktila Township. He attended the Officer Training School in Mingalardon, graduating in 1950. He became a journalist, and from 1985 to 1990 was editor-in-chief of the state-run daily newspaper Kyemon. Later he became general manager of the News and Periodical Enterprise within the Ministry of Information. U Soe Nyunt served as Deputy Minister of Information from 1992 to 2003 and Deputy Minister of Culture from 1993 to 2003 under Major General Kyi Aung.

U Soe Nyunt retired with the rank of lieutenant colonel in 2003. He died from liver cancer on 2 October 2009 at his home in Botahtaung Township, aged 78. He was survived by his wife, Daw Hla Yin Yin Soe, and their eight children.

== Work and recognition ==
Soe Nyunt usually used the pen name Htilar Sitthu, but also used the names Than Lwin, Ye Gaung Kyaw Swa and Bo Than Mani. His upbringing in Mandalay Division was a recurring theme in his work. U Soe Nyunt published more than 50 books in Burmese or English. Eighteen of his books have been translated from Burmese into English, French or German. Soe Nyunt was awarded a PhD in Poetry and Composition from Dublin Metropolitan University. His poems were included in textbooks issued by the Ministry of Education for use by primary and secondary students.

U Soe Nyunt was made the Poet Laureate of Myanmar. He received many awards. In 1997 the Myanmar Writers and Journalists Association (MWJA) held a ceremony to honor U Soe Nyunt at Studio-A of Myanma Radio and Television. On 17 June 2001 the MWJA arranged a meeting at Oktara Hall of Karaweik Palace where the Writers Association of the People's Republic of China awarded him the honorary title of "Literary Messenger of Friendship". The award was given for his contributions to "the cultural exchange and the great cause of friendship between Chinese and Myanma peoples".

== Selected bibliography ==
- Htilar Sitthu, Ashim Ananda (translator) (1988). The little scarecrow in the paddy field: poems of Htilar Sitthu. Daw Hla Yin, Burma Golden Land Pub. House. p. 179.
- Htilar Sitthu (1990). O withered leaf from the River Mekong and other poems. Myanmar Shwe-pyi Literature House. p. 409.
- Malikha Chit Thu (Lover of Malikha) - made into a film
- Mya Pale Thwe (Pearl Necklace) - made into a film
- Yametzaw (Desire) - made into a film
- Then, Quiet Flows the Ayeyarwady
- Htilar Sitthu, 王介南 (2000). Yi jiang Yang zi you yi song. 缅甸仰光外语大学. p. 85.
- Htilar Sitthu (2004). O' sound of bell from Nagasaki. Mranʻ mā rvhe praññʻ cā pe tuikʻ. p. 245.
- Memorable History of Mandalay, Memorable Capital Mandalay
