= Maung Maung Swe =

Burmese politician

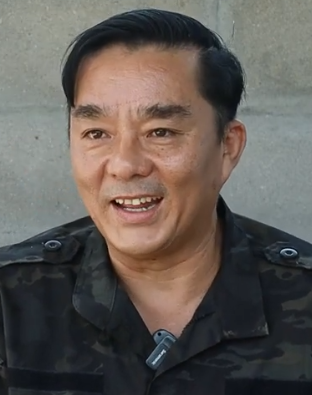
- Maung Maung Swe in 2023

Member of the Amyotha Hluttaw
- Incumbent
- Assumed office 1 February 2016
- Constituency: Mandalay Region No.9

Personal details
- Born: 23 May 1971 (age 55) Rakhine State, Burma (Myanmar)
- Party: National League for Democracy
- Spouse: Khin Su Hlaing
- Parent(s): Khin Maung Swe (father); Nu Thar Sein (mother)
- Education: Dagon University B.A(History)

Maung Maung Swe (Burmese: မောင်မောင်ဆွေ , born 23 May 1971) is a Burmese politician who currently serves as an Amyotha Hluttaw MP for Mandalay Region No. 9 Constituency. He is a member of National League for Democracy.

== Early life and education ==
He was born on 23 May 1971 in Rakhine State, Burma (Myanmar). He graduated with B.A in History from Dagon University.

== Political career ==
He is a member of the National League for Democracy. In the 2015 Myanmar general election, he was elected as an Amyotha Hluttaw MP and elected representative from Mandalay Region No. 9 parliamentary constituency.
