= Svend Asmussen =

Danish jazz violinist

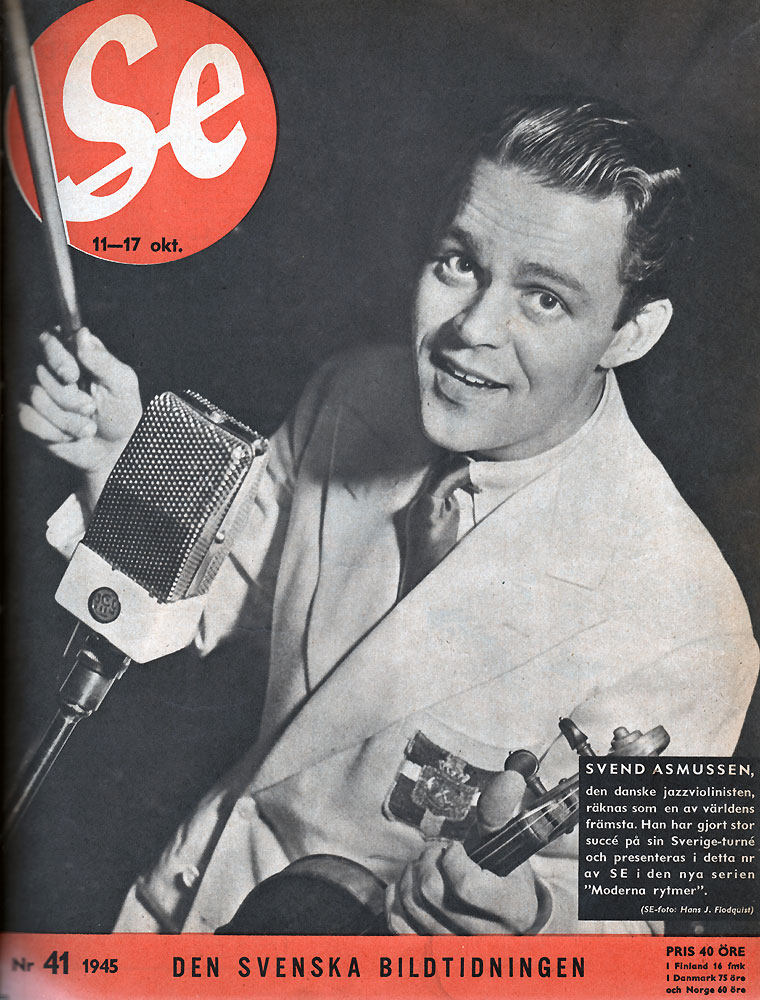
- Svend Asmussen on the cover of the Swedish weekly Se 1945

Background information
- Birth name: Svend Harald Christian Asmussen
- Born: 28 February 1916; Copenhagen, Denmark
- Died: 7 February 2017 (aged 100); Dronningmølle, Denmark
- Genres: Jazz
- Occupations: Violinist
- Years active: 1923–2010

Svend Asmussen (28 February 1916 – 7 February 2017) was a Danish jazz violinist, known as "The Fiddling Viking". A Swing-style virtuoso, he played and recorded with many other notable jazz musicians, including Duke Ellington, Benny Goodman and Stephane Grappelli. He played publicly until 2010 when he had a blood clot, his career having spanned eight decades.

== Life and career ==
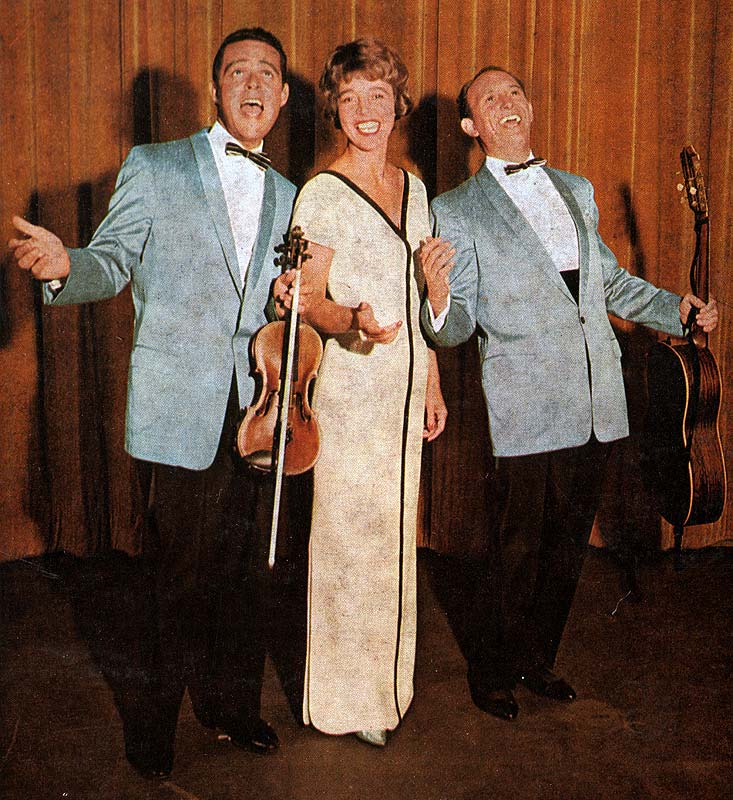
Svend Asmussen with The Swe-Danes in 1961, with Alice Babs at the center and Ulrik Neumann to the right.

Asmussen was born in Copenhagen, Denmark, was raised in a musical family, and started taking violin lessons at the age of seven. Aged 16, he first heard recordings by jazz violinist Joe Venuti and began to emulate his style. He started working professionally as a violinist, vibraphonist, and singer at age 17, leaving his formal training behind for good. Early in his career he worked in Denmark and on cruise ships, with artists such as Josephine Baker and Fats Waller. Asmussen later was greatly influenced by Stuff Smith, whom he met in Denmark. Asmussen played with Valdemar Eiberg and Kjeld Bonfils during World War II, during which time jazz had moved to the underground and served as a form of political protest.

In the late 1950s, Asmussen formed the trio Swe-Danes with singer Alice Babs and guitarist Ulrik Neumann. The group became quite successful in Scandinavia for their music hall style entertainment and also toured the United States. Asmussen also worked with Benny Goodman, Lionel Hampton, and Duke Ellington. Asmussen was invited by Ellington to play on his Jazz Violin Session recording in 1963 with Stéphane Grappelli and Ray Nance.

In 1966, Asmussen appeared alongside Grappelli, Stuff Smith, and Jean-Luc Ponty in a jazz Violin Summit in Switzerland that was issued as a live recording. He made an appearance at the 1967 Monterey Jazz Festival, which included a celebrated violin summit with him, Ray Nance and Jean-Luc Ponty. In 1969, he guested on Snakes in a Hole, an album by the jazz-rock band Made in Sweden. He was still active playing violin at the age of 94.

Asmussen became a centenarian on 28 February 2016. He died peacefully in his sleep on 7 February 2017, three weeks before his 101st birthday.

Asmussen's collection of jazz music, photographs, posters and other material is held in the jazz collections at the University Library of Southern Denmark. Asmussen's son, Claus Asmussen, is a guitar player in Denmark and a former member of the band Shu-Bi-Dua.

== Discography ==
=== As leader ===
- Plays Hot Fiddle (Parlophone, 1953)
- Danish Imports with Ulrik Neumann (Warner Bros., 1961)
- European Encounter with John Lewis (Atlantic, 1962)
- Scandinavian Folk Songs Sung and Swung! with Alice Babs (Philips, 1964)
- Evergreens (Odeon, 1965)
- Violin Summit with Stephane Grappelli, Stuff Smith, Jean-Luc Ponty (Prestige, 1968)
- Just Fiddlin' Around with Deiter Reith (Murbo, 1967)
- Two of a Kind with Stephane Grappelli (Polydor, 1968)
- Yesterday and Today with Toots Thielemans (A&M, 1973)
- Toots and Svend with Toots Thielemans (Sonet, 1973)
- As Time Goes By with Lionel Hampton (Sonet, 1978)
- June Night (Doctor Jazz, 1983)
- String Swing with Ulf Wakenius (Sonet, 1983)
- On the Good Ship Lollipop with Teresa Brewer (Doctor Jazz, 1983)
- Makin' Whoopee...and Music (Arbors, 2009)
- Rhythm Is Our Business (Storyville, 2009)
- The Jazz Man Hitler Failed to Silence (Roastin, 2011)

=== As sideman ===
- Oscar Aleman, Swing Guitar Masterpieces 1938–1957 (Acoustic Disc, 1998)
- Sathima Bea Benjamin, A Morning in Paris (Enja, 1997)
- Kenny Drew, Niels-Henning Ørsted Pedersen, Ed Thigpen, Prize/Winners (Matrix, 1978)
- Duke Ellington, Duke Ellington's Jazz Violin Session (Atlantic, 1976)
- David Grisman, Svingin' with Svend (Zebra Acoustic, 1988)
- L. Subramaniam, Garland (Storyville, 1982)
