= Myint Swe (politician, born 1965) =

Burmese politician and military officer

- မြင့်ဆွေ

Military member of the Amyotha Hluttaw
- Incumbent
- Assumed office 3 February 2016

Personal details
- Born: 18 March 1965 (age 61) Hmawbi, Yangon Region, Myanmar
- Party: Military representative
- Parent: Kyaw Sein (father)
- Education: Yangon University (B.Sc)

Military service
- Allegiance: Burma
- Branch/service: Myanmar Army
- Rank: Major

Myint Swe (Burmese: မြင့်ဆွေ, born 18 March 1965) is a Burmese politician and military officer who currently serves as a military representative for Amyotha Hluttaw. He is a member of Amyotha Hluttaw Women and Children's Rights Committee.

== Early life and education ==
Myint Swe was born on 18 March 1965 in Hmawbi, Yangon Region, Myanmar. He graduated with a B.Sc from Yangon University. Myint Swe is a major at Myanmar Army, military officer.
