= Shu-bi-dua =

Danish pop group

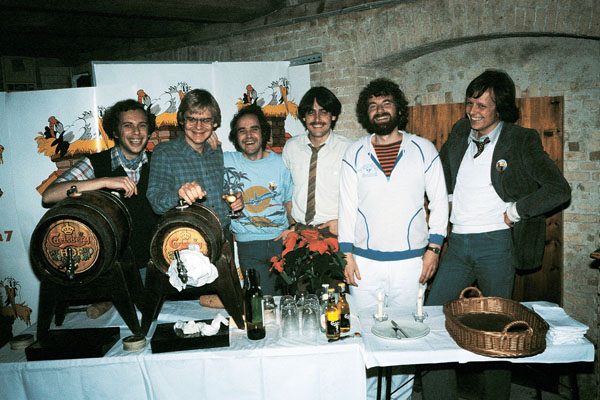
- Shu-bi-dua in 1980

Background information
- Origin: Copenhagen, Denmark
- Genres: Rock, pop
- Years active: 1973–2011
- Website: shubidua.dk

Shu-bi-dua (stylised as Shu•bi•dua) was a Danish pop group formed in 1973 in Copenhagen as an expansion of the group Passport. Throughout their 40-year history, Shu-bi-dua changed their lineup many times. Their lead singer, Michael Bundesen, was with the band throughout, except for a gap between 1984 and 1987. They have produced many well-known hits in Denmark, like "Vuffeli-vov", "Hvalen Hvalborg", "Står på en Alpetop", "Stærk Tobak" (to the music from the Phil Medley and Bert Russell song "Twist and Shout"), "Familien kom til Kaffe", "Sexchikane", "We wanna be free", and many more.

Their musical style owed much to folk and Central European schlager, but the core was always light rock. However, like "Weird Al" Yankovic, their musical styles could vary depending on the lyrics or the song. They are the Danish band with the most albums sold in Denmark, with more than 6 million as of 2022. Notable characteristics were wordplay and humour, but also often with serious backgrounds, like sexual harassment, climate change, or life. In a YouTube video about the history of the band, Bundesen and Hardinger were asked at the end to name a song that represents the band best. Bundesen named "Den røde tråd", a comical but still autobiographical song about his development from working-class poverty to finding "your place in the sun." Even in the 2000s, the band got the audience to sing along with the first verse.

== History ==
Passport, which in the beginning of 1973 released the single "Tomorrow/Everything's Wrong", consisted of the guitarists Michael Hardinger and Poul Meyendorff, the drummer Bosse Hall Christensen, and bass guitarist Niels Grønbech. The group was extended with the singer Michael Bundesen and keyboard player Jens Tage Nielsen, and under the name Shu-bi-dua released the single "Fed Rock/Tynd Blues" before the group released the single "Change of the Guard/Highway of Living" under the name Passport. Shu-bi-dua was originally considered a one-off group, but when the debut single produced the hit "Fed Rock", they kept it.

As Shu-bi-dua, they quickly became successful, and the name Passport was dropped. In 1974, they released their first self-titled album, Shu-bi-dua. One reason for their success was their often humorous translations of rock classics, made with great care and accuracy and often with a refined sense of wordplay in their Danish lyrics (largely untranslatable to English). They did, however, also compose music of their own, often straightforward, with simple and catchy tunes, easy to sing, high party energy usually built in; several of their hits from the 1970s are still regular party classics today, with their laid-back, energetic style. Some lyrics were intelligent, like those of "Hvalen Hvalborg" (lit. 'The Whale Hvalborg'), about a deceased and stuffed whale friend. Others were simple and/or silly, like those of "Where are the Keys" (the song's only line), but all their songs are composed with great care for detail. The group also ventured into other projects, like the movie The Red Cow (considered a major flop) or the Shu-Bi-40 Christmas album with reggae versions of various Christmas songs and carols and an underlying story about the sale of the Virgin Islands (Saint Croix, Saint John and Saint Thomas) to the US, in which everybody completely forgot the little (fictitious) island of Saint Hans—which also happened to be the name of a Danish mental institution.

After the first album, Poul Meyendorf left the group and was replaced by Claus Asmussen, a sound engineer on the first. Since then, the group has had numerous changes in its lineup. Claus Asmussen replaced Poul Meyendorff in 1975, Kim Daugaard replaced Niels Grønbech in 1977, Willy Pedersen replaced Jens Tage Nielsen, and Kasper Winding replaced Bosse Hall Christensen in 1981. In 1984, Michael Bundesen left the group to become station chief on the Copenhagen TV station Kanal 2, and simultaneously, Kasper Winding left to be replaced by Paul Callaby. In 1987, Jørgen Thorup was made a permanent member of the group when Willy Pedersen left. Thorup had been singing backup vocals since Shu-bi-dua 11 in 1985. Michael Bundesen returned as lead singer in 1987, while Søren Jacobsen joined the band. In 1988, Peter Andersen replaced Paul Callaby as drummer, and shortly after that, Søren Jacobsen left the band again.

After making the film Den røde tråd in 1989, they went on a sabbatical until their return in 1992 with the hit single "Sexchikane". In the intervening years, they re-released their back catalogue on CD in 1990, and in 1991, released a best-of album by the name Stærk tobak!! (lit. 'Strong Tobacco'). In connection to this, they played live in front of 50,000 people on Bellevue Beach. In 1997, Michael Hardinger left the band after 24 years. He was replaced by Ole Kibsgaard, and in 2001, Jørgen Thorup left the band to be replaced by Jacob Christoffersen. The band celebrated their 30th anniversary in 2003 with a 10-CD set called Shu-bi-dua 200 (each CD had 20 songs). In 2005, Claus Asmussen left Shu-bi-dua, having been the only original continuous member in the group's 30-year history. The group has, since 2011, been on an indefinite hiatus since lead singer Michael Bundesen suffered a brain embolism. Michael Bundesen, the focal point of the group, was born on 12 May 1949, and died on 8 November 2020.

== Lineup ==
Final line-up (2011)

- Michael Bundesen (vocals), 1973–1984, 1987–2020 (died 8 November 2020)
- Kim Daugaard (bass/vocals), 1977–
- Peter Andersen (drums/vocals), 1988–
- Ole Kibsgaard (guitar/vocals), 1997–
- Jacob Christoffersen (keyboard/vocals), 2001–

Previous members

- Michael Hardinger (guitar/vocals), 1973–1997 (+ lyrics/composer and guest musician in 2005)
- Poul Meyendorff (guitar), 1973–1974
- Niels Grønbech (bass), 1973–1977
- Bosse Hall Christensen (drums), 1973–1981 (+ lyrics 1985)
- Jens Tage Nielsen (keyboard), 1973–1981
- Claus Asmussen (guitar/vocals), 1975–2005
- Kasper Winding (drums), 1981–1984
- Willy Pedersen (keyboard), 1981–1986
- Paul Callaby (drums), 1984–1988
- Jørgen Thorup (keyboard/vocals), 1987–2001
- Søren Jacobsen (keyboard/guitar), 1987–1988

== Discography ==
=== Studio albums ===
- 1974: Shu-bi-dua
- 1975: Shu-bi-dua 2
- 1976: Shu-bi-dua 3
- 1977: Shu-bi-dua 4
- 1978: 78'eren
- 1979: Shu-bi-dua 6
- 1980: Shu-bi-dua 7
- 1982: Shu-bi-dua 8
- 1982: Shu-bi-dua 9
- 1983: Shu-bi-dua 10
- 1985: Shu-bi-dua 11
- 1987: Shu-bi-dua 12
- 1992: Shu-bi-dua 13
- 1993: Shu-bi-dua 14
- 1994: Shu-bi-40
- 1995: Shu-bi-dua 15
- 1997: Shu-bi-dua 16
- 2000: Shu-bi-dua 17
- 2005: Shu-bi-dua 18 (Peaked in DEN: #2)

=== Compilations and live releases ===
- 1975: Shu-bi-dua's værste
- 1978: Leif i Parken
- 1981: Duernes bedste
- 1985: Da mor var dreng
- 1988: 32 Hits
- 1991: Stærk tobak!! (3-CD set)
- 1992: Vi finner oss ikke i sexsjikane (Norwegian)
- 1994: Live og glade dage
- 1996: 15 skarpe skud, 1996
- 1997: 40 bedste
- 1998: Shu-bi-læum 73–98
- 2001: Rap jul og godt nytår
- 2003: Shu-bi-dua 200 (Peaked in DEN: #1)
- 2004: Symfo-ni-dua
- 2010: Shu-bi-dua 1–18 (Box) (Peaked in DEN #40)
  - Shu-bi-dua 1–9 (Box) (Peaked in DEN #2)
  - Shu-bi-dua 10–18 (Box) (Peaked in DEN #27)
- 2010: Live i Stockholm (download only)
- 2013: 40 Års Shu-bi-læum – De 40 Største hits (Peaked in DEN #2) (Certified gold)

=== Singles ===
- 2010: "Midsommersangen" (Peaked in DEN: #32)
