= Hla Thein Swe =

Burmese military officer

- လှသိန်းဆွေ

Deputy Minister for Finance and Revenue of Myanmar
- In office 25 August 2003 – 30 March 2011

Personal details
- Born: 8 March 1957 (age 69) Burma
- Party: Union Solidarity and Development Party
- Spouse: Thida Win

Military service
- Allegiance: Myanmar
- Branch/service: Myanmar Army
- Rank: Colonel

Hla Thein Swe (Burmese: လှသိန်းဆွေ) is a Burmese military officer. He previously served as Deputy Minister of Finance and Revenue, beginning on 25 August 2003. He contested the 2012 Burmese by-elections, for a Pyithu Hluttaw seat representing Ottarathiri Township as a Union Solidarity and Development Party.

Hla Thein Swe was born on 8 March 1957. He is married to Thida Win.
