= Saw Tun (minister) =

Burmese military officer and general

His Excellency Major General Saw Tun
- စောထွန်း

Minister for Construction of Myanmar
- In office 17 June 1995 – 2009
- Preceded by: Khin Maung Yin
- Succeeded by: Khin Maung Myint

Personal details
- Born: Kyaukse, British Burma
- Spouse: Myint Myint Ko
- Occupation: Military general, Union Minister

Military service
- Allegiance: Myanmar
- Branch/service: Myanmar Army
- Years of service: –1995
- Rank: Major General

Major General Saw Tun (Burmese: စောထွန်း) is a Burmese military officer and retired major general in the Myanmar Army. He has served as Minister for Construction of Myanmar from 17 June 1995 to 2009. Saw Tun was one of the longest serving ministers in the first cabinet of Than Shwe.

== Personal life ==
Saw Htun is married to Myint Myint Ko.
