= Tint (name) =

Tint (Burmese: တင့်) may refer to the following people:

Given name

- Bogalay Tint Aung (1922–2021), Burmese composer, director and writer
- Khin Maung Tint, known as Tekkatho Phone Naing, Burmese writer
- Mya Than Tint (1929–1998), Burmese writer and translator
- Sein Bo Tint, Burmese musician
- Tint Hsan (born 1956), Burmese Minister for Sports
- Tint Swe (disambiguation), multiple people
- Usha Narayanan, born Tint Tint (1922–2008), First Lady of India
- Win Win Tint, Burmese businesswoman

Surname

- Francine Tint, American abstract expressionist painter and costume designer
