= Tint (magazine) =

American magazine

- Frequency: Biannual
- Website: tintmagazine.com

Tint magazine was a quarterly global zine and independent magazine published in Detroit, Michigan. Its motto "Celebrating Women of Every Color" targeted all women, the magazine typically covered issues from the voices of women of color, and often from a politically left-wing perspective.

Tint began as a multicultural women's webzine, first published in 2004 by then college freshman Margarita L. Barry on the campus of Bowling Green State University in Bowling Green, Ohio. Created as a response to the lack of diverse faces and voices in mainstream women's publications, the first issue of Tint was launched in PDF format online that May. Barry never intended for the magazine to be a campus publication, though a misquote in the university's weekly newspaper, The BG News, hinted otherwise. The print edition of Tint was published twice per year.

Tint has been loosely linked to several subcultures and movements, including Transculturation, DIY Culture, Arts and Crafts Movement, Anarcho-punk, Afro-punk, Zine, Feminism, Black Feminism, Grassroots, and Activism.

Tint featured cover stories on a unique blend of women including actress/vocalist Alisa Reyes, actress/vocalist Persia White, and recording artist Goapele, all celebrities of multiethnic heritages with notable grassroots arts or activism involvement. In addition to celebrity interviews, Tint also featured stories on everyday women.
