= Swe-Danes =

Danish-Swedish jazz and entertainment trio

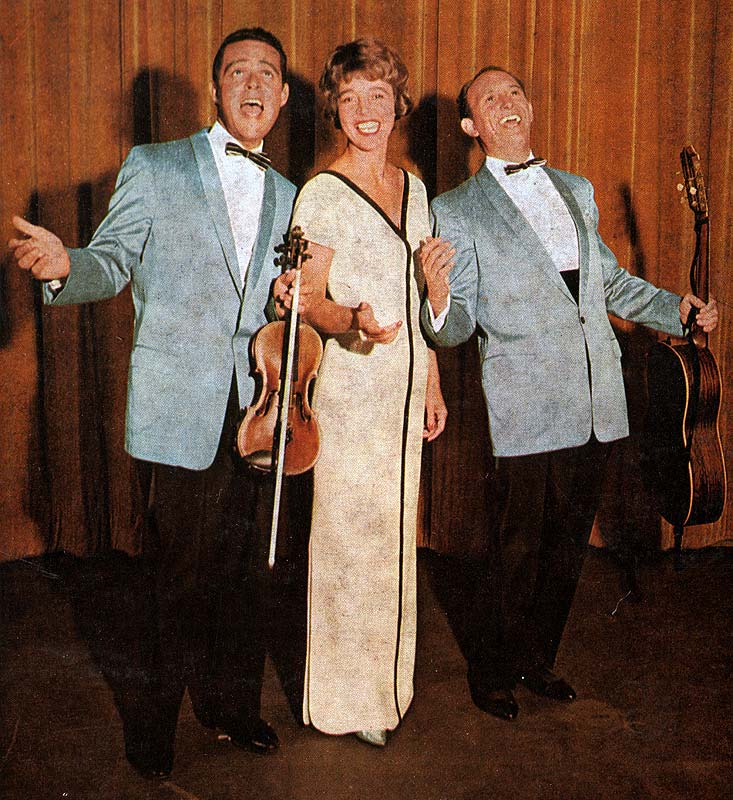
- The Swe-Danes in 1961, from left to right: Svend Asmussen, Alice Babs and Ulrik Neumann

Background information
- Origin: Denmark; Sweden
- Genres: Jazz; scat singing
- Years active: 1958–1963
- Past members: Svend Asmussen; Ulrik Neumann; Alice Babs

Swe-Danes was a Danish-Swedish jazz and entertainment trio (music, comedy, dance) consisting of Svend Asmussen (violin), Ulrik Neumann (guitar and occasionally vocals) and Alice Babs (singing).

Swe-Danes participated in the revue "Evergreens" in Stockholm and raised international attention. In 1958-1961 they showed up in the big scenes in Scandinavia, England and Germany as well as in the United States, among other at Coconut Grove in Los Angeles. In 1961 they appeared on The Dinah Shore Chevy Show hosted by Dinah Shore. In the episode, "Dinah Travels to Denmark", Dinah duets with Alice on "Sittin' On Top of the World".

Popular records are Scandinavian Shuffle (1960) and Swe-Danes på Berns (1961). The trio was dissolved in 1963.
