= Tint Swe (politician, born 1936) =

- တင့်ဆွေ

Deputy Minister for Construction of Myanmar
- In office 7 May 1998 – 30 March 2011

Personal details
- Born: 7 November 1936 (age 89) Burma
- Party: Union Solidarity and Development Party

Tint Swe (Burmese: တင့်ဆွေ) is a former Deputy Minister of Construction.

He was born on 7 November 1936.
