= Tin Hlaing =

Burmese politician and army officer

Tin Hlaing (Burmese: တင်လှိုင်) is a former minister of home affairs of Myanmar and an army colonel. He was a member of the State Peace and Development Council.
