= Hla Myint Swe (artist) =

- လှမြင့်ဆွေ
- Born: 1948 (age 77–78); Bhamo, Kachin State, Burma
- Known for: painter, photographer, author

Hla Myint Swe (Burmese: လှမြင့်ဆွေ [l̥a̰ mjɪ̰ɰ̃ sʰwè]; born 1948) is an artist, photographer and author from Myanmar. He was born in Bamaw, Kachin State, Myanmar in 1948. He attended the Defence Services Academy, Pyin Oo Lwin and after graduating served in various positions as an army officer. As of 2010, he was head of the Public Relations and Information Department of the Yangon City Development Committee.

== Artistic work ==
Hla Myint Swe works in watercolor, oil, acrylics and photography. He is best known for his lifelike ink drawings, particularly of the national races, in which he tries to capture the personality and mood of his subject through a drawing of the face or full figure. He came to use this medium while serving in the army, since he could sketch anywhere with no more than a ballpoint pen. His Spiritual Soulfulness of Myanmar (1997), is a collection of essays and photographs from the Myanmar Theravada perspective. An English-language version of the book was issued in June 2008. Myanmar National Tribes is a collection of sketches showing the dresses and life-style of nationalities such as Lisu, Wa, Naga, Akha, Chin, Jingphaw, Padaung and Shan.

For his seventh book, Buddham Dhammam Samgham: Buddhist faith in Myanmar, published in December 2009, Hla Myint Swe travelled through Myanmar and Nepal to take the photographs. In Nepal, he photographed the pilgrimage site of Lumbini, considered the birthplace of Siddhartha Gautama, the Nepalese prince who later founded the Buddhist tradition. Other photographs show Buddhist monks, nuns, temples and pagodas as well as spectacular local scenery.

== Government position ==
As head of the Yangon City Development Committee's public relations and information department, he is also head of the City FM radio station. In February 2004 the station launched the Hello! FM program in which experts would give answers to questions mailed in by the audience, such as on the procedures to follow to open a shop or obtain a building permit. His department also runs The Monitor, a newspaper. Discussing press freedom in October 2010, he noted that "There is no country that has absolute freedom of the press," going on to say that "In some situations it’s right that some information is not released". But he also noted that due to the centralist government structure, many civil servants were afraid to speak to journalists since action could be taken against them, and said he had experienced this himself.

== Bibliography ==
- Yangon – The Garden City. 1995.
- Spiritual Soulfulness of Myanmar. 2007.
- Shewdagon – Symbol of Strength and Serenity. 1997.
- Yangon – Green City of Grace. 1999.
- Myanmar National Tribes.
- Pen Sketches & Aesthetics of Artist Hla Myint Swe Vol. I. 2006.
- Buddham Dhammam Samgham: Buddhist faith in Myanmar. Spirit Asia. 2009. ISBN 978-981-08-3555-2.
- Splendour land - Traditional Culture and Customs of Myanmar Kinsfolk. 2010. ISBN 978-981-08-6393-7.
- Pen Sketches of Artist Hla Myint Swe. 2010.
- Paragon - Exotic cultural heritage beauties of Myanmar. 2011. ISBN 978-981-08-8763-6.
