= Hla Myint Swe (minister) =

Major General Hla Myint Swe (Burmese: လှမြင့်ဆွေ [l̥a̰ mjɪ̰ɰ̃ sʰwè]) was Minister of Transport in Myanmar.

== Early career ==
Hla Myint Swe fought against the Burma Communist Party in the 1970s. In 1991, as Brigadier-General, Hla Myint Swe was Commander of the LID-88 in Magwe. In July 1997 he was Chairman of Sagaing Division Law and Order Restoration Council and Commander of North West Command. In November 1997, the government named him as Ministry of Industry No.(2), with U Aung Thaung as Ministry of Industry No. (1). In this role, in June 1998 he inspected Mandalay Industrial Zone No.2 and gave instructions.

== Minister of Transport ==
In March 1999, as Minister of Transport, Hla Myint Swe donated medical equipment worth K 350,000 and cash for the 500 No.2 Military Hospital beds on the occasion of the 54th Anniversary of Armed Forces Day. He presented the equipment to the Director of Medical Services, Brigadier General Mya Thein Han. In June 1999 Hla Myint Swe met the staff of Myanmar Airways International, urging them to work hard, seek ways to earn more foreign exchange, be loyal to the State, take innovative measures, uphold national prestige and integrity and make all-out efforts for development of the State. In April 2000 he led the Myanmar delegation at a meeting in Tachilek, Shan State, where China, Laos, Myanmar and Thailand signed an agreement on Commercial Navigation on the Lancang River - Mekong River.

In May 2000, he was included on the list of persons to whom the EU visa ban applied, and whose funds held in the EU would be frozen. In 2003 Hla Myint Swe's spouse Daw San San Myint was included in the EU ban. These restrictions were confirmed in April 2004.

In September 2002 Hla Myint Swe represented Myanmar at a meeting of transportation ministers of the Association of Southeast Asian Nations (ASEAN), where the attendees said they would liberalize the movement of people and goods within the region. He attended the ninth ASEAN Transport Ministers meeting on 23–24 October 2003, where the ministers had a candid exchange of views on broadening and deepening of policy and program directions for ASEAN transport cooperation. In April 2004, he attended a meeting to coordinate the hoisting of the diamond bud atop Thabinnyu Pagoda for public obeisance. The same month, he and the Bangladeshi Minister for Communications Nazmul Huda opened the stone pillar to mark completion of the 36 kilometres long Ramu-Gundun road section of the 133 kilometres long Bangladesh-Myanmar Friendship Road.

On 28 July 2004 Myanma Airways, an agency of the Ministry of Transport signed an agreement with partners to launch Air Myanmar, a new international airline. Major General Hla Myint Swe made a speech at the announcement. Air Myanmar service was a failed project, starting in 2004 and ending in 2005.

== Later career ==
On 18 September 2004 a cabinet reshuffle was announced, in which Hla Myint Swe was replaced as Minister of Transport by Major General Thein Swe. Reports from state-controlled media said he was "permitted to retire", but did not give any reason. In December 2006 he was in command of the Light Infantry Division 44, with HQ at Thaton, Mon State, which was in the Sittang river valley in support of operations against Karen rebels.
