= Myanmar protests (2021–present) =

Protests against the February 2021 coup

- Part of the Myanmar civil war (2021–present) and the aftermath of the 2021 Myanmar coup d'état
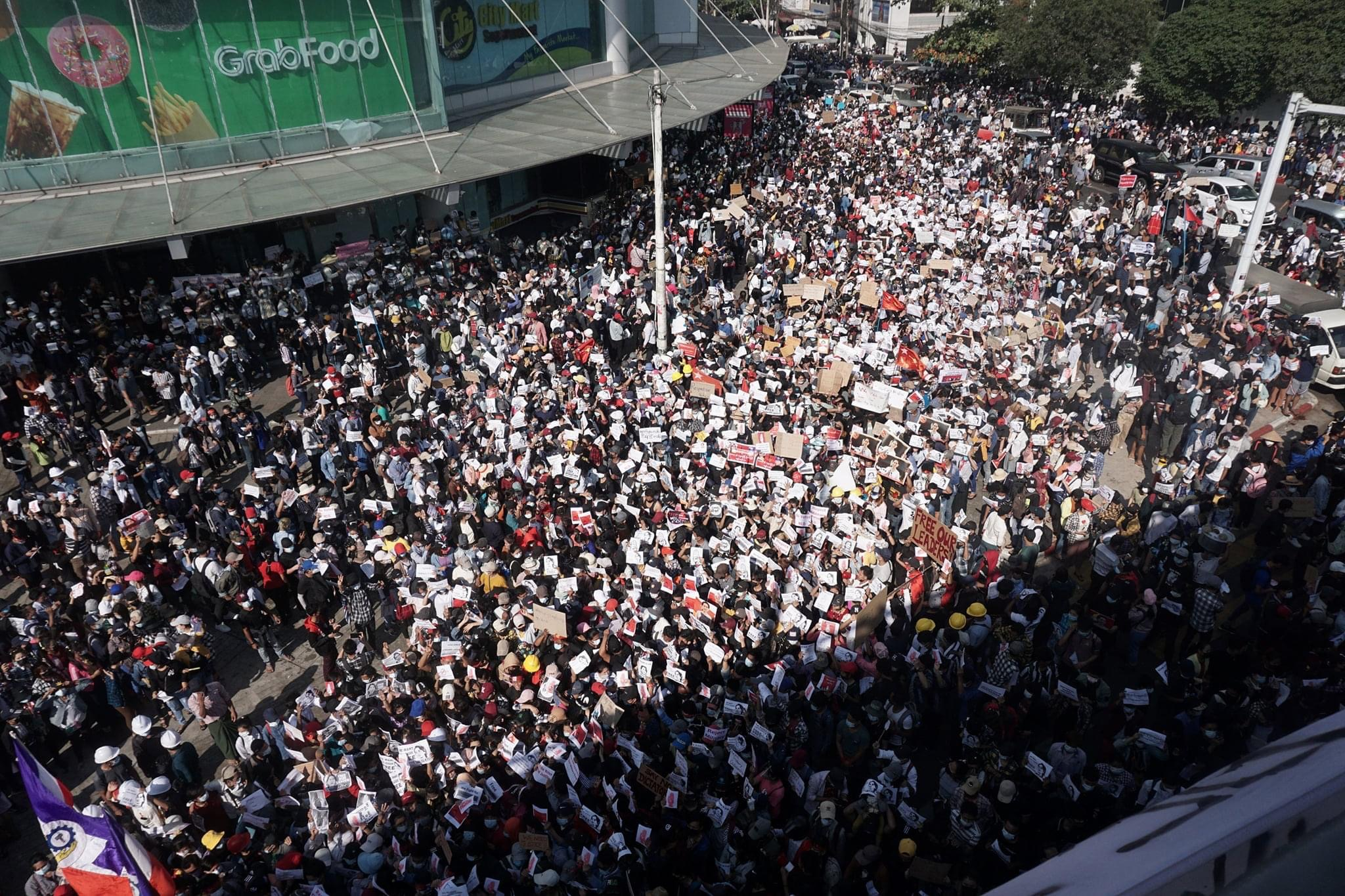
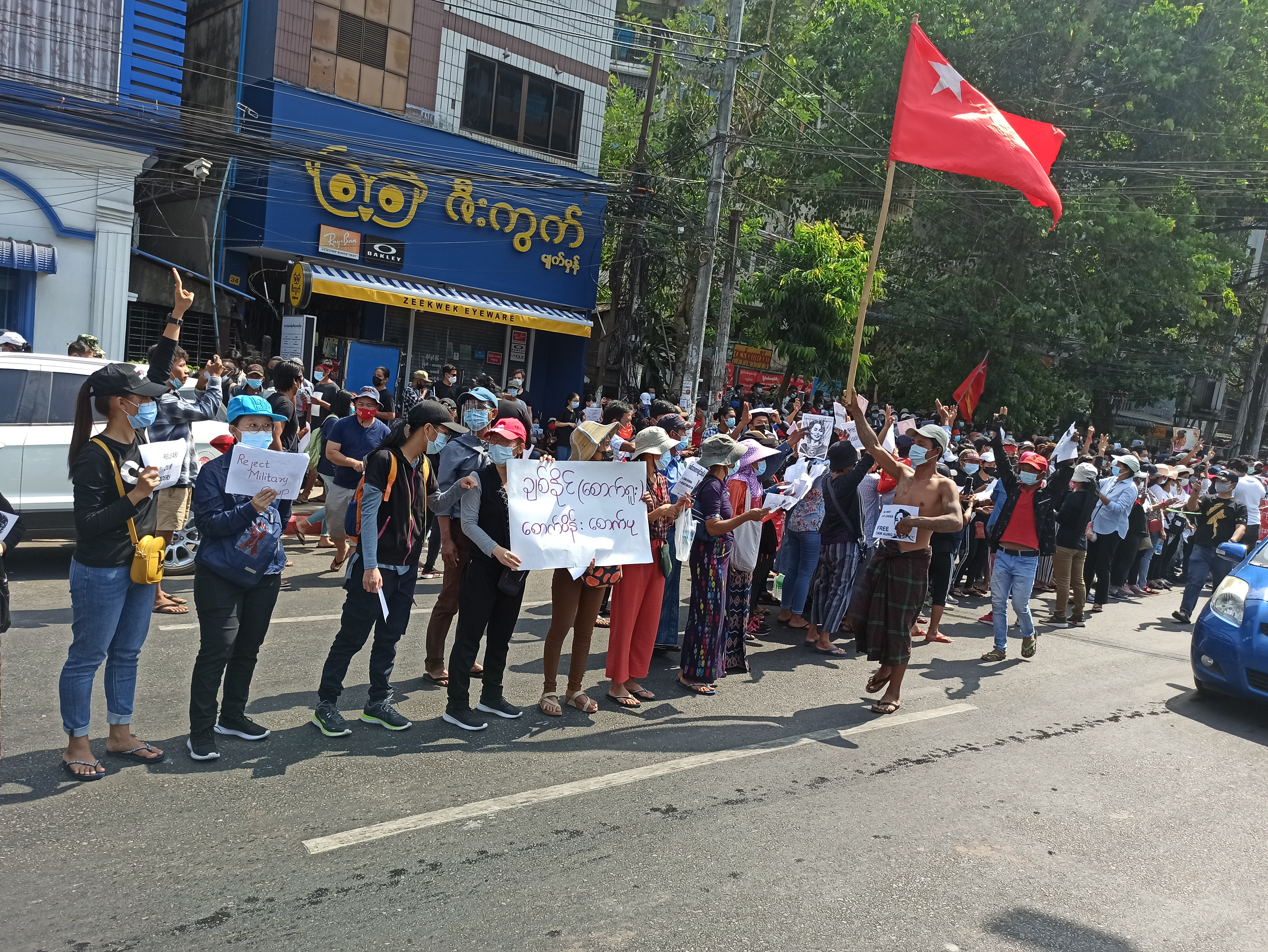
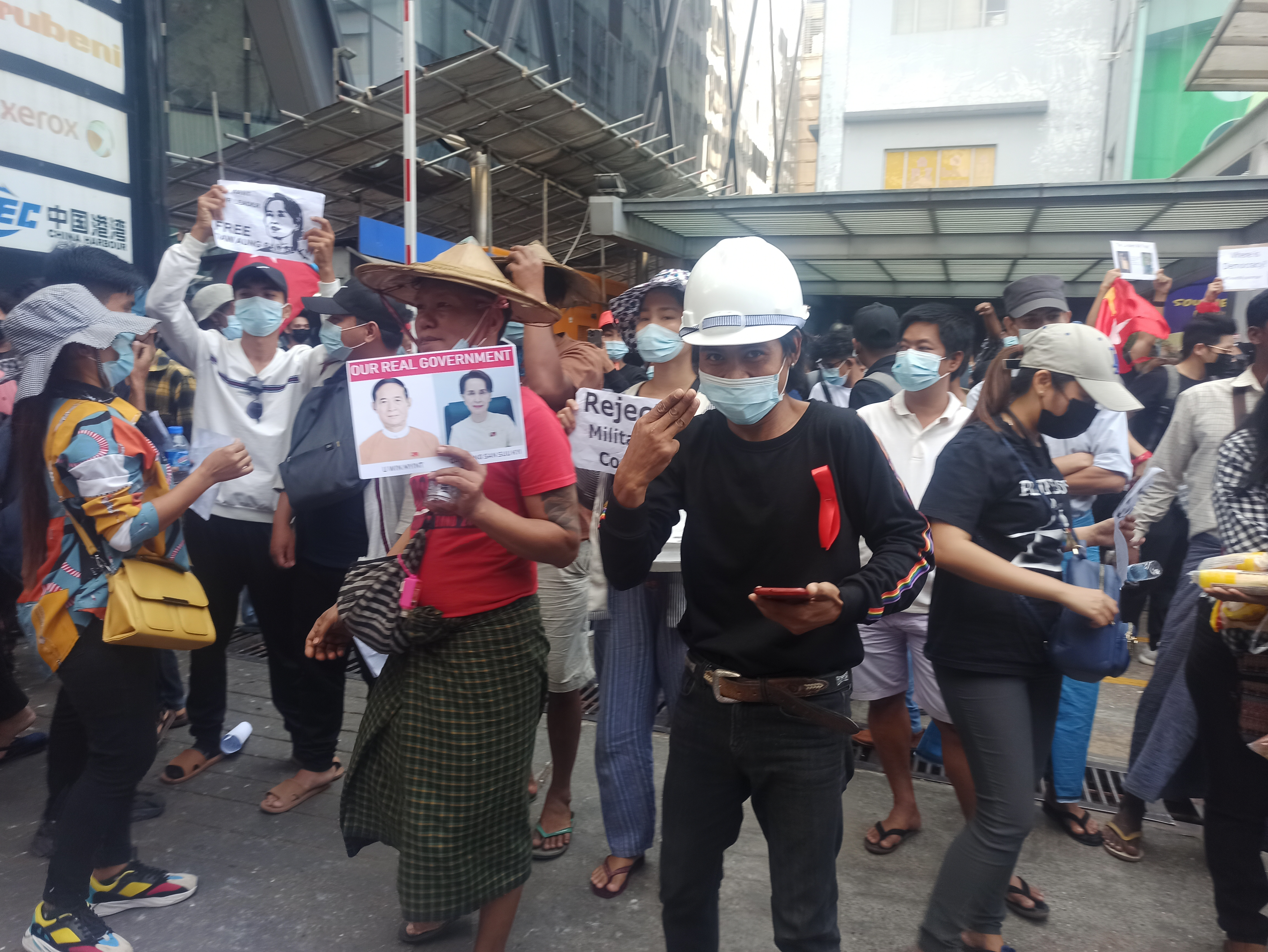
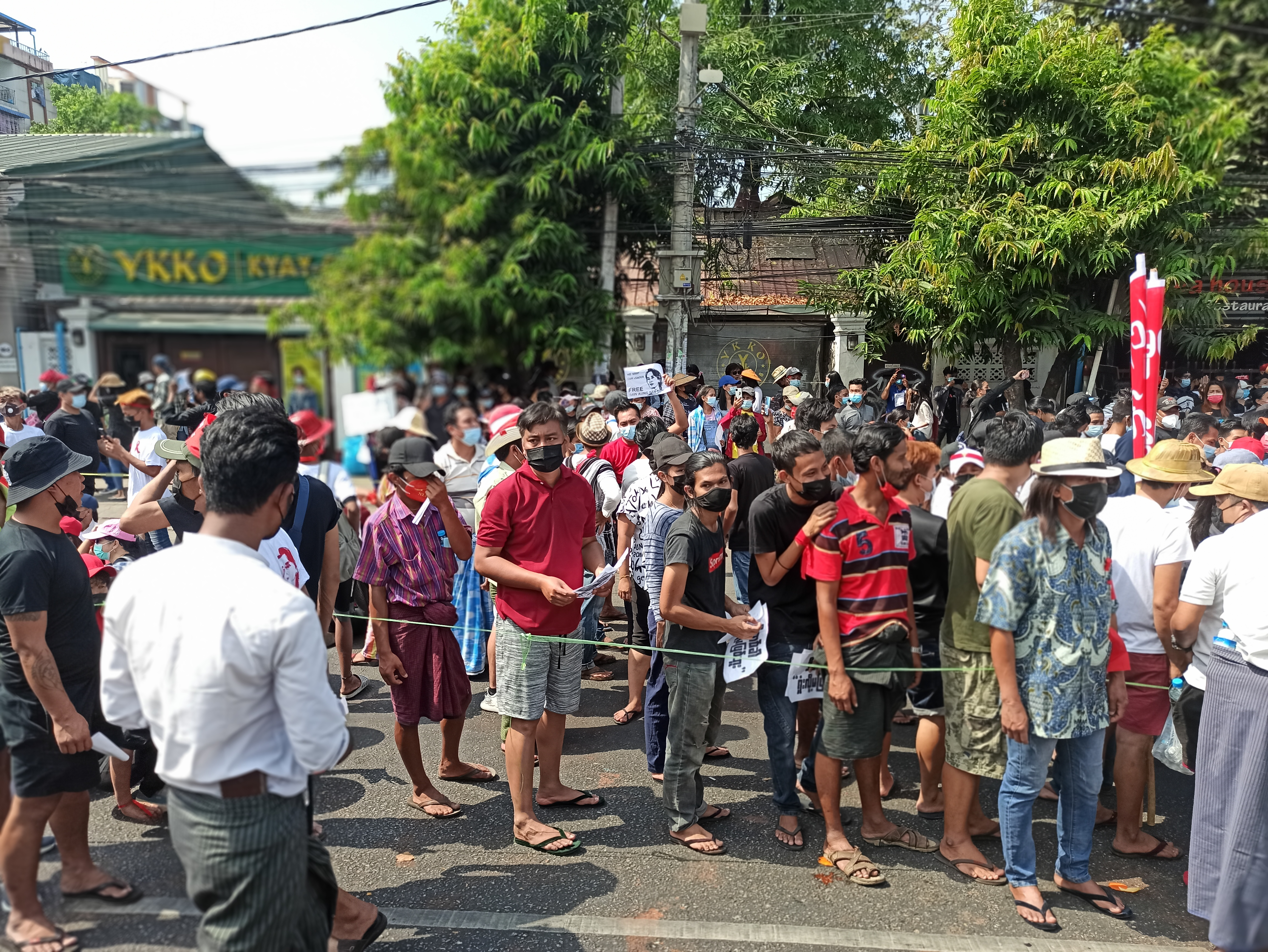
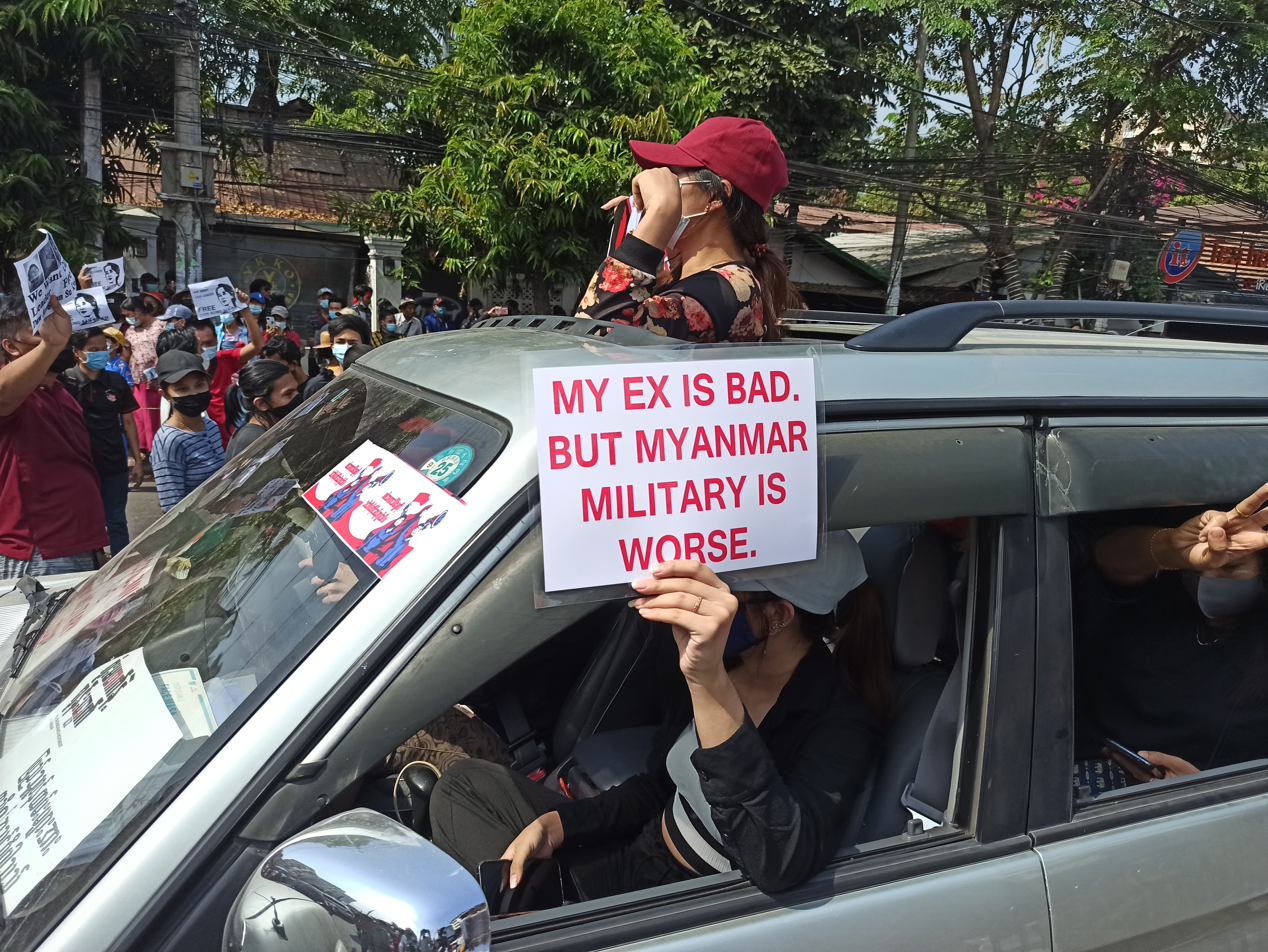
- Clockwise from top: Thousands of protesters participating in an anti-junta rally in Yangon; Protesters posing with the three-finger salute; Protesters in a vehicle with anti-military slogans; A group of protesters forming a human chain in Yangon's Kamayut Township; A group of protesters denouncing Min Aung Hlaing, orchestrator of the 2021 coup and current leader, and waving the NLD flag
- Date: 2 February 2021 – present (5 years, 9 months, 2 weeks and 5 days)
- Location: Myanmar
- Caused by: 2021 Myanmar coup d'état: Decades-long authoritarianism of the Tatmadaw
- Goals: Resignation of Chairman of the State Administration Council Min Aung Hlaing; Release of Aung San Suu Kyi, Win Myint, and other political detainees; Recognition of the 2020 general election results; Restoration of the civilian government; Abolition of the 2008 Constitution; Establishment of a federal democracy
- Methods: Demonstrations, strikes, civil disobedience, online activism, protest art, riots
- Status: Ongoing: Nationwide internet curfew ended; Nationwide mobile networks shut down; State of emergency ended 31 July 2025, election scheduled for December; Outbreak of a civil war

Parties
Protesters: Civil Disobedience Movement; Students; Trade unions; National Unity Government: People's Defence Force; Supported by: National League for Democracy; Communist Party of Burma; Democratic Party for a New Society; All Burma Federation of Student Unions; Ethnic armed organisations	Government of Myanmar: Tatmadaw; Army; Air Force; Navy; Coast Guard; Police Force; Border Guard; Supported by: Union Solidarity and Development Party; National Democratic Force; Pro-military counterprotesters

Lead figures
Protesters: No centralised leadership; National Unity Government: Duwa Lashi La; Mahn Win Khaing Than; Yee Mon	Min Aung Hlaing; Soe Win; Mya Tun Oo; Yar Pyae; Ni Lin Aung; Aung Lin Dwe

Casualties
- Deaths: 8,687 protesters (per AAPP); 47 police officers and 7 soldiers (per SAC; as of 23 May 2021) (Note: One police officer was killed while participating in the protests and is also included in the AAPP count of killed protesters.)
- Detained: 15,232 verified detained currently, (per AAPP)

Protests in Myanmar, known locally as the Spring Revolution (Burmese: နွေဦးတော်လှန်ရေး, Burmese pronunciation: [nwè.ú.tɔ̀.l̥àɰ̃.jé]), began in early 2021 in opposition to the coup d'état on 1 February, staged by Min Aung Hlaing, the commander-in-chief of the country's armed forces, the Tatmadaw. As of 23 June 2022, at least 2000 protesters had been killed, 14,000 arrested and 700,000 displaced by the military junta.

Protesters mostly employed peaceful and nonviolent forms of protest, which included acts of civil disobedience, labour strikes, a military boycott campaign, a pot-banging movement, a red ribbon campaign, public protests, and formal recognition of the election results by elected representatives. The colour red, which is associated with the National League for Democracy (NLD), has been donned by many protesters. "Kamba Ma Kyay Buu", a song that was first popularised as the anthem of the 8888 Uprising (1988), has been revitalised by the civil disobedience movement as a protest song. The three-finger salute has been widely adopted by protesters as a protest symbol.

In response to the growing protest movement, the military leaders of the coup enacted a number of countermeasures. These included internet and social media blackouts, a media blackout, pursuit of arrests and criminal sentences against protesters, the spread of disinformation, political overtures to competing political parties to participate in the self-appointed State Administration Council (to replace the elected government body), deployment of pro-military protesters and instigators, and the violent use of force to suppress protests.

Armed insurgencies by the People's Defence Force of the National Unity Government have erupted throughout Myanmar in response to the military government's crackdown on anti-coup protests.

== Background ==
The 2021 Myanmar coup d'état began on the morning of 1 February 2021 when democratically elected members of Myanmar's ruling party, the National League for Democracy (NLD), were deposed by the Tatmadaw – Myanmar's military – which vested power in a stratocracy, the State Administration Council. The Tatmadaw declared a year-long state of emergency and declared power had been vested in Commander-in-Chief of Defence Services Min Aung Hlaing. The coup d'état occurred the day before the Parliament of Myanmar was due to swear in the members elected at the November 2020 general election, thereby preventing this from occurring. President Win Myint and State Counsellor Aung San Suu Kyi were detained, along with ministers and their deputies and members of Parliament.

When the coup took place, a key source of mobilisation were industrial workers in Myanmar, who understood the coup as an event that would pave the way for greater worker exploitation and wage depression. Workers went on to form a key base from which the Spring revolution developed. However, the ability of workers in Myanmar to mobilise and resist against the coup, while not prevented outright, was weakened by the pre-coup democratic transition era. In this period, international financial institutions, foreign consultants, US-trained Burmese advisors, and Myanmar's governments (including the NLD), restricted the ability of workers, peasants, and students to organise. The effect of which was the limiting of the mass base that emerged after the coup in exchange for an investment friendly environment.

The coup took place amid the COVID-19 pandemic. Myanmar was struggling with one of the most severe outbreaks in Southeast Asia, owing to its poor health infrastructure and ongoing internal conflict. The country had begun its COVID-19 vaccination deployment a few days before the coup. The country's economy had also been greatly affected by the pandemic, shrinking by 5% during 2020.

=== Recognition of election outcomes ===
Representatives elected in the November 2020 elections have not officially recognised the legitimacy of the coup d'état. On 4 February 2021, around seventy MP-elects from the NLD took an oath of office in Naypyidaw, pledging to abide by the people's mandate, and serve as lawmakers for a five-year term. The following day, 300 elected legislators formed a committee to conduct parliamentary affairs, the Committee Representing Pyidaungsu Hluttaw (CRPH). The committee held its first session on Zoom.

On 6 February 2021, several political parties, including the Shan Nationalities League for Democracy (SNLD), the Democratic Party for a New Society (DPNS), the Karen National Party, and Asho Chin National Party, announced they had rejected the military's offer to participate in the State Administration Council. The Karenni National Progressive Party has publicly denounced the military coup and the coup's detrimental effect on controlling the COVID-19 pandemic and ongoing peace talks, and called for the NLD and Armed Forces to compromise, in order to resolve the country's political stalemate.

On 7 February, the parliamentary committee condemned the military coup as a "criminal act" and dismissed Min Aung Hlaing's military cabinet as being illegitimate. The committee cited the military with violating Chapter 6 of the Myanmar Penal Code in overthrowing the civilian government. CRPH has advised UN diplomats and the international community to contact the committee to discuss official government business.

On 14 February, the Karen National Union issued a statement announcing its public support for the ongoing protests, and characterised the military's seizure of power as a step toward military dictatorship, contrary to the vision of national reconciliation.

On 15 February, the Committee for Shan State Unity, a coalition of Shan ethnic armed groups and political parties that includes the Restoration Council of Shan State, the Shan State Progress Party, the Shan National League for Democracy, and the Shan Nationalities Democratic Party, and the Sin Kyawt Militia, publicly opposed the coup, announcing its support of the ongoing protests, and calling for the abolition of the 2008 constitution and restoration of civilian-led government.

== Campaigns and strikes ==
Myanmar has a long history of contentious collective action and a varied repertoire of protest. Soon after the coup, protesters deployed a number of inherited forms of political action that are historically and culturally specific to Myanmar. But they also developed innovative tactics and strategies borrowed from global repertoires of contention.

=== Civil Disobedience Movement and labour strikes ===
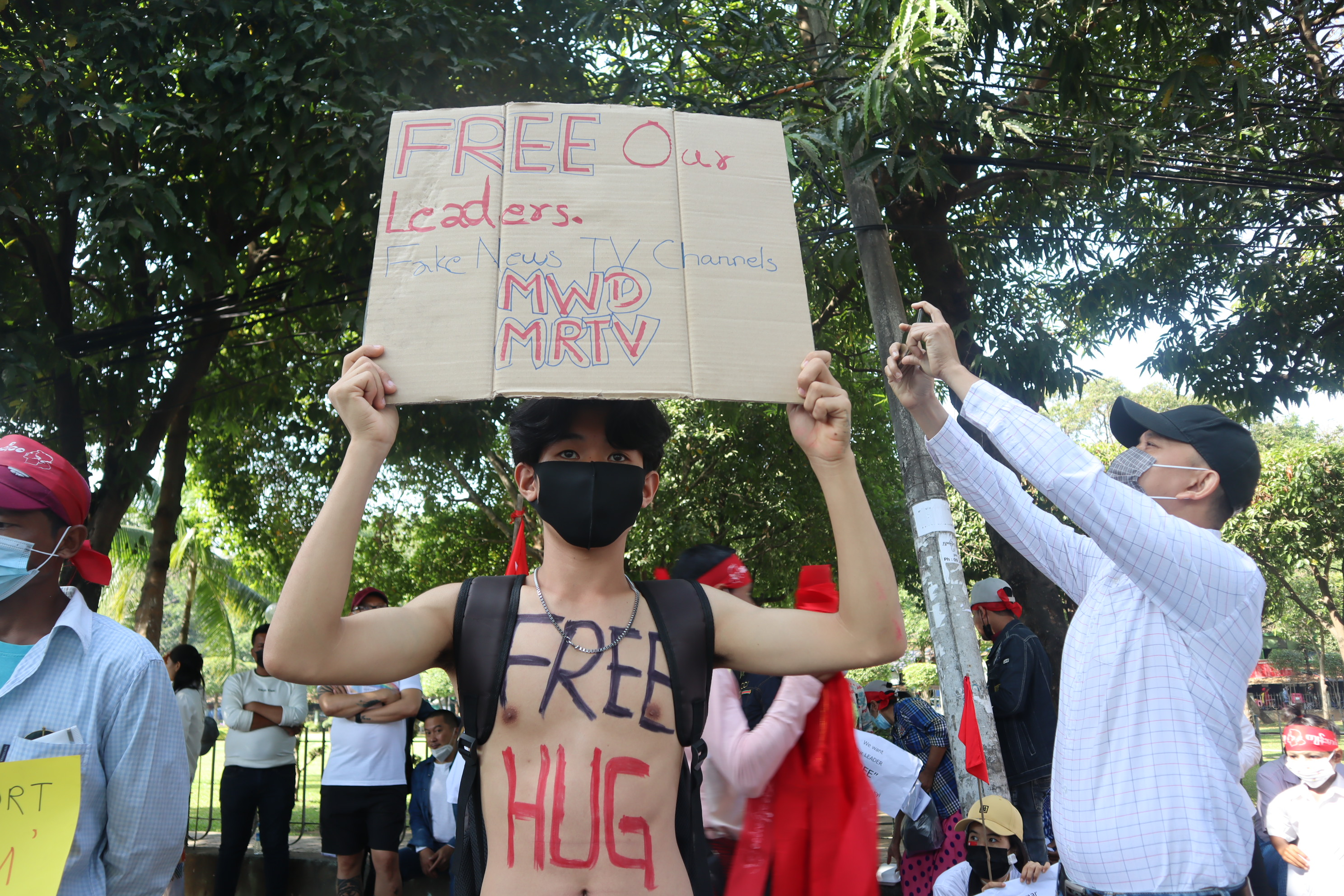
A teen protesting against the military coup

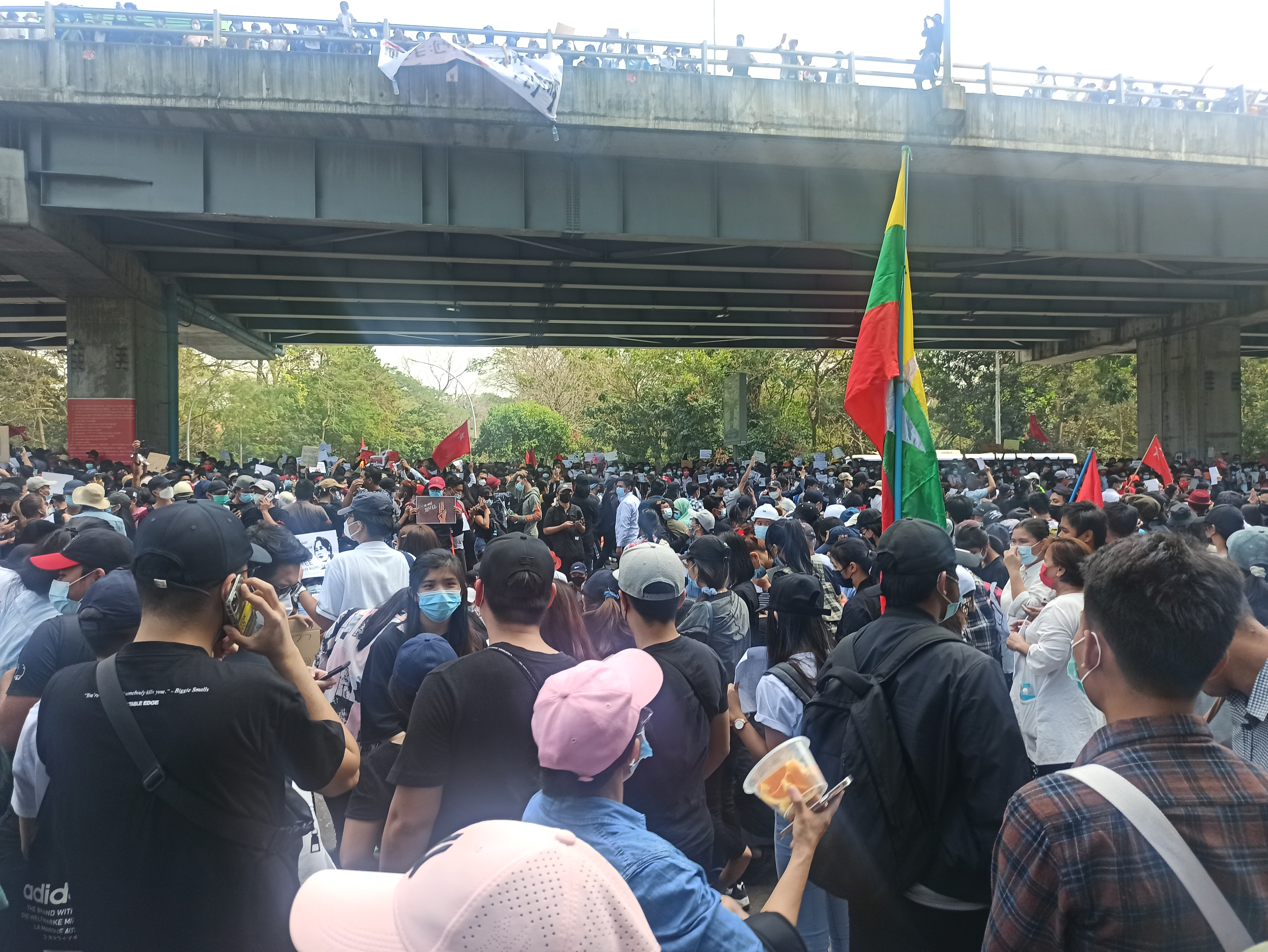
Protests under the Hledan Overpass Bridge

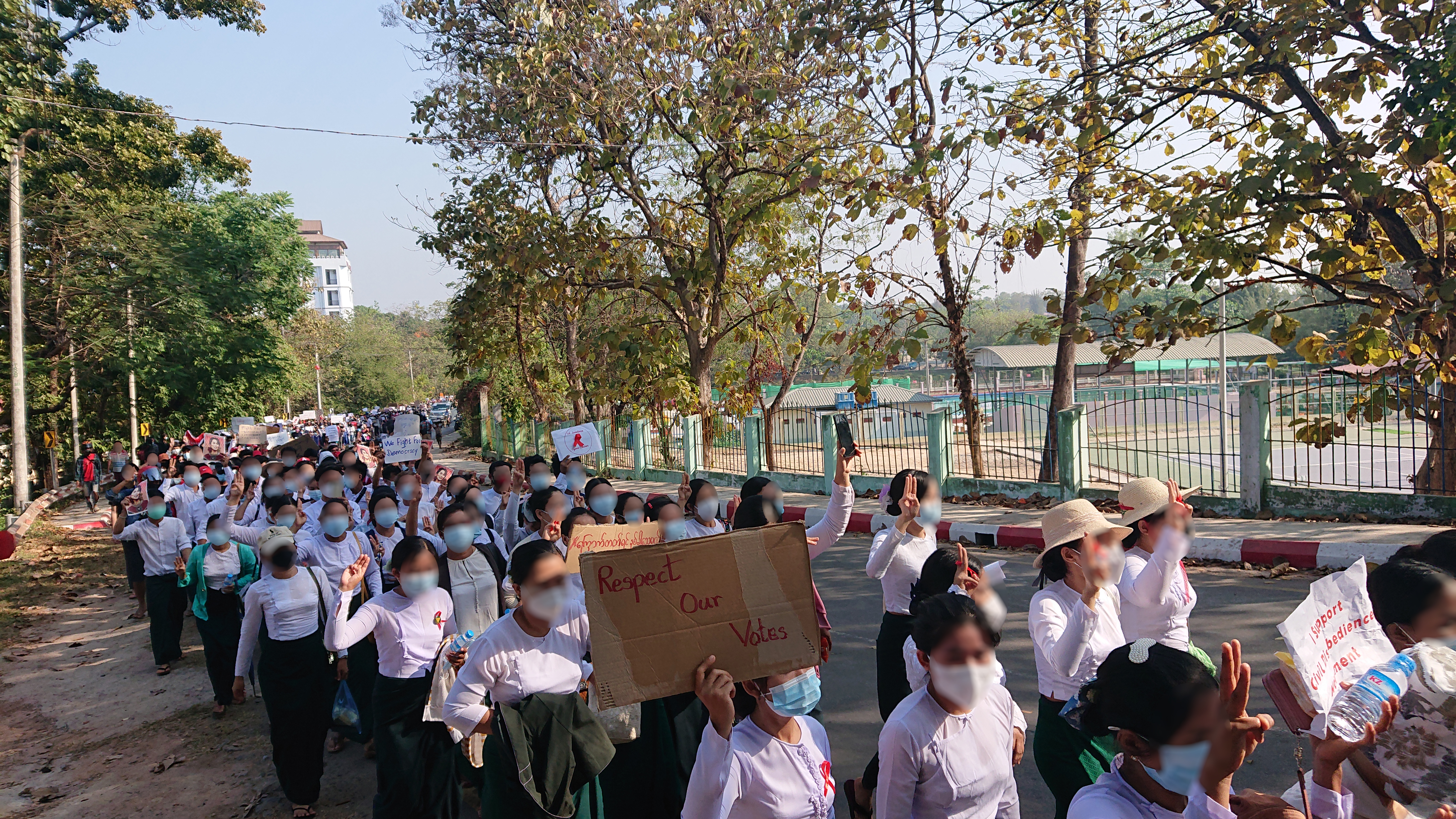
A group of uniformed schoolteachers protesting in Hpa-an on 9 February 2021

On 2 February 2021, healthcare workers and civil servants across the country, including in the national capital, Naypyidaw, launched a national civil disobedience movement (အာဏာဖီဆန်ရေးလှုပ်ရှားမှု), in opposition to the coup d'état. A Facebook campaign group dubbed the "Civil Disobedience Movement" has attracted more than 230,000 followers, since its initial launch on 2 February 2021. Min Ko Naing, an Uprising leader, has urged the public to adopt a "no recognition, no participation" stance to the military regime. One expert on the government's civil service system estimated that the country had about one million civil servants and that about three-quarters of them had walked off their jobs.

Healthcare workers from dozens of state-run hospitals and institutions initiated a labour strike starting 3 February 2021. As of 3 February 2021, healthcare workers in more than 110 hospitals and healthcare agencies have participated in the movement. Six of the thirteen-member Mandalay City Development Committee, including vice-mayor Ye Mon, resigned on 3 February 2021, in protest against the coup d'état. Labor strike participants have faced intimidation and threats from superiors. By 9 February, COVID vaccination had been suspended, the country's testing system had collapsed and most hospitals in Myanmar had shut down.

The labour strikes have quickly spread to other sectors. Seven teacher organisations, including the 100,000-strong Myanmar Teachers' Federation, have pledged to join the labour strike. Staff in the Ministry of Foreign Affairs, formerly led by Aung San Suu Kyi, have also joined the strike. On 4 February 2021, in Naypyidaw, civil servants employed at the Ministry of Agriculture, Livestock and Irrigation staged a protest. On 5 February 2021, three hundred copper miners at the Kyisintaung copper mines joined the strike campaign. Miner Sithu Tun stated that the strike would continue until the "elected leaders receive[d] their power back". By 5 February 2021, the civil service strike included administrative, medical, and educational sector staff and students at "91 government hospitals, 18 universities and colleges and 12 government departments in 79 townships". Nan Nwe, a member of the psychology department at Yangon University stated, "As we teach students to question and understand justice, we can't accept this injustice. Our stand is not political. We only stand up for the justice."

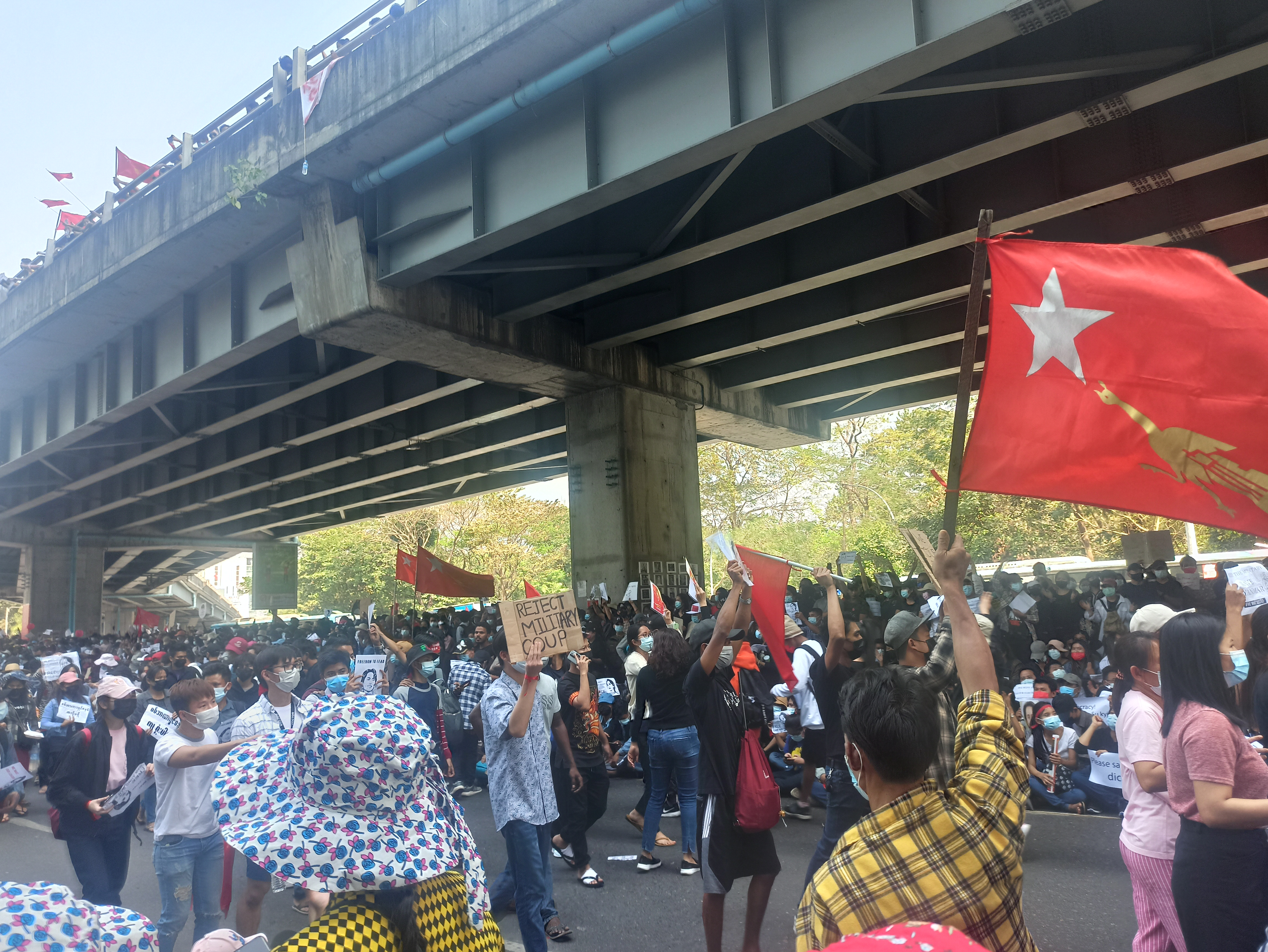
Protest at Hledan Junction in Yangon

On 8 February, news emerged that state-run newspapers Kyemon and the Global New Light of Myanmar intended to halt publications to protest the coup. On 8 February, all of workers from Myanmar railways participated in the movement and so, the railway transportation is completely stopped. On 8 February, Kanbawza Bank temporarily closed its branches due to staffing shortages resulting from KBZ staff participating in the civil disobedience campaign. Other banks were also impacted by staff participation in the ongoing campaign. On 9 February, staff from the Central Bank of Myanmar joined the movement.

On 9 February, the impact of Civil Disobedience Movement activities led the Ministry of Health and Sports to publish a public plea in the state-run New Light of Myanmar requesting healthcare workers to return to work. On 10 February, Myanmar's largest trade union, the Confederation of Trade Unions of Myanmar (CTUM), announced plans to pursue prosecution for workplace officials who retaliate against employees joining the civil disobedience movement. On 11 February, Min Aung Hlaing urged civil servants to put aside their feelings and return to work. On 16 February, a Ministry of Information spokesperson warned civil servants participating in the movement, warning that authorities would not wait long for their return to work.

A number of industry lobbying groups, including the Myanmar Mobile Industry Association and the Myanmar Cosmetics Association, have suspended cooperation with government agencies following the coup.

From 25 February, truck drivers also began a strike against the coup by refusing to transport goods from the docks at Yangon's four main ports. Joint secretary of the Myanmar Container Trucking Association said he estimates that about 90% of the 4,000 city's drivers are on strike, and have promised to deliver only essential food, medicine and fabrics for factories.

=== Military boycott campaign ===
On 3 February 2021, a domestic boycott movement called the "Stop Buying Junta Business" campaign emerged, calling for the boycott of products and services linked to the Myanmar military. Among the targeted goods and services in the Burmese military's significant business portfolio include Mytel, a national telecoms carrier, Myanmar Beer, Mandalay Beer, and Dagon Beer, several coffee and tea brands, 7th Sense Creation, which was co-founded by Min Aung Hlaing's daughter, and bus lines.

In response to the boycott, 71 engineers working for Mytel in Sagaing Region resigned in protest. Some retail outlets have begun pulling Myanmar Beer from stores.

On 5 February, Kirin Company ended its joint venture with the military-owned Myanma Economic Holdings Limited (MEHL). The joint venture, Myanmar Brewery, produces several brands of beer, including Myanmar Beer, and has an 80% market share in the country. Kirin's stake had been valued at US $1.7 billion. On 8 February, Lim Kaling, co-founder of Razer Inc., announced he was divesting his stake in a joint venture with a Singaporean tobacco company that owns a 49% stake in Virginia Tobacco, a local tobacco manufacturer that is majority-owned by MEHL. Virginia Tobacco produces two popular local cigarette brands, Red Ruby and Premium Gold.

=== Pot-banging movement ===
Since the onset of the coup d'état, residents in urban centers such as Yangon have staged cacerolazos, striking pots and pans in unison every evening as a symbolic act to drive away evil, as a method of expressing their opposition to the coup d'état. On 5 February 2021, thirty people in Mandalay were charged under section 47 of the Police Act for banging pots and kitchenware.

=== Red ribbon campaign ===
On 3 February 2021, healthcare workers in Myanmar launched the red ribbon campaign (ဖဲကြိုးနီလှုပ်ရှားမှု). The colour red is associated with the National League for Democracy (NLD), the incumbent political party that won the 2020 elections. Ni Ni Khin Zaw, a popular Burmese singer and medical school graduate, publicly endorsed the campaign. Civil servants and workers across Myanmar, including union-level ministries, have adopted the red ribbon as a symbol of opposition to the military regime. On 5 February 2021, copper miners at Kyinsintaung mines unable to join the labour strike joined the red ribbon campaign. On 6 February 2021, factory garment workers in Thaketa Industrial Zone joined the red ribbon campaign.

=== Social media ===
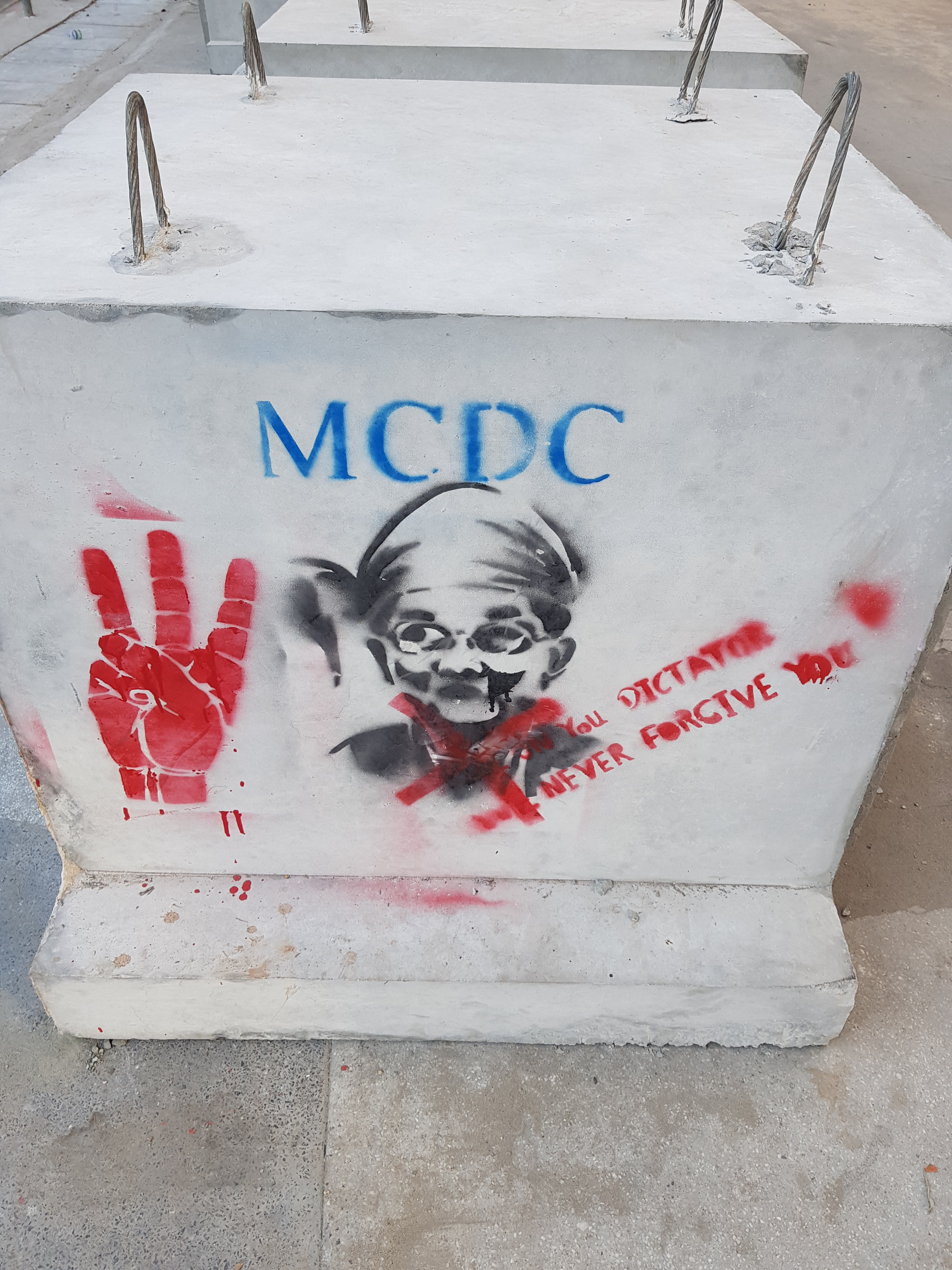
Protest art depicting Min Aung Hlaing in Mandalay

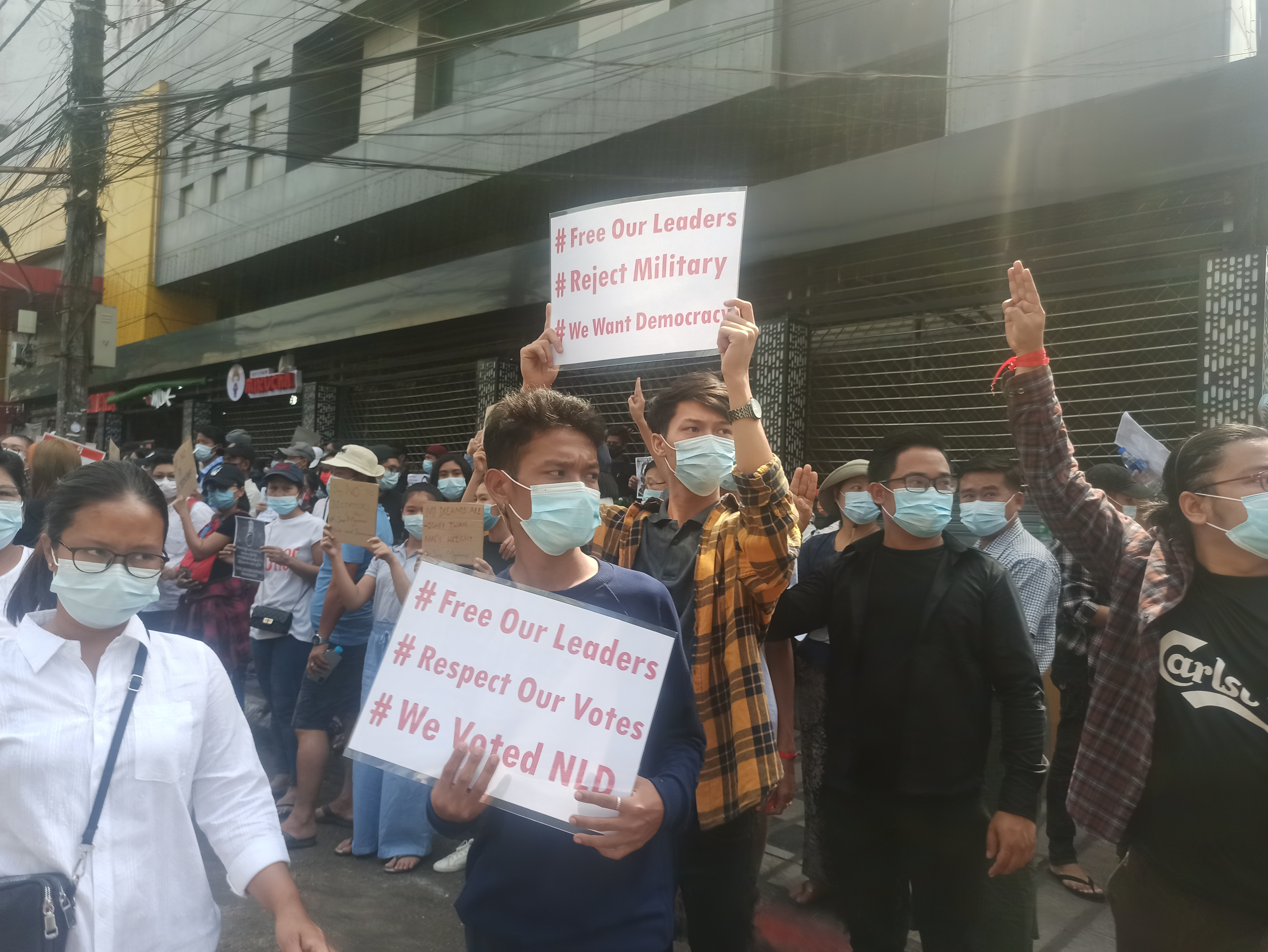
Demonstrators carrying placards with several hashtag slogans

Burmese celebrities and politicians, including Paing Takhon and Daung, have publicly supported civil resistance efforts, posing with the three-finger salute in social media posts. Celebrities and social media influencers, such Sai Sai Kham Leng and Nay Chi Oo, who were silent or were slow to support the ongoing popular protests lost sizeable online followings. On 7 February, Nay Soe Maung, son-in-law of Myanmar's former dictator Than Shwe, posted a Facebook photo demonstrating support for the protests.

Burmese netizens have popularised trending hashtags like #SayNototheCoup, #RespectOurVotes, #HearTheVoiceofMyanmar, #SaveMyanmar, and #CivilDisobedience. Within a day after the coup d'état, the #SaveMyanmar hashtag had been used by over 325,000 Facebook users. Social media users had also changed their profile pictures to black to show their sorrow or red in support of the NLD, often with a portrait of Suu Kyi. Burmese netizens have also ridiculed Min Aung Hlaing's short stature online, and some pro-democracy netizens have joined the Milk Tea Alliance, an online democratic solidarity movement in Asia.

=== Staged mass "car breakdowns" and "slow-car" movement ===
On 17 February 2021, many cars mysteriously broke down in busy streets of Yangon in a staged demonstration, in a creative attempt to block security forces and police to pass through the traffic and to thwart the government workers from going to work. The movement continued on 18 February 2021 with many broken-down cars joined by some moving at a very slow speed to block traffic.

=== 2022 silent strike ===
On 1 February 2022, to mark the one year anniversary of the military takeover, Myanmar people took part in a 'silent strike' by staying home, closing down shops and halt all outdoor activities, resulting in streets in many main towns and cities were nearly deserted. The junta have warned participants would be charged with violating terrorism and incitement law.

Military lobbyist Han Nyein Oo posted on his Telegram channel about shop owners who have notified on social media that the store would be closed on the day on which the silent strike would be conducted and called for their arrest. More than 200 people were detained by the military council after the post.

== Junta repressions ==
=== Internet blackout ===
On 4 February 2021, telecom operators and internet service providers across Myanmar were ordered to block Facebook until 7 February 2021, to ensure the "country's stability". Myanma Posts and Telecommunications (MPT), a state-owned carrier, also blocked Facebook Messenger, Instagram and WhatsApp services, while Telenor Myanmar blocked only Facebook. Facebook had been used to organise the civil disobedience campaign's labour strikes and the emerging boycott movement. Facebook is used by half of Myanmar's population. Following the Facebook ban, Burmese users had begun flocking to Twitter. The following day, the government extended the social media access ban to include Instagram and Twitter.

Following the Facebook ban, demand for VPN services surged in the country. According to a UK-based digital privacy and security research group, demand for VPN surged by more than 7000%. The free to use proxy service Psiphon, used to circumvent censorship, has seen its user base surge from 5,000 daily users before the 1 February coup d'état to more than 1.6 million users with an average of 14 million daily connections as of 15 February 2021.

On 19 February 2021, most ISPs, Mytel being one of the exceptions, began blocking Wikipedia and other related websites.

On the morning of 6 February 2021, the military authorities initiated an internet outage nationwide. That same day, Facebook urged authorities to unblock social media services. Facebook also removed the Burmese government's ability to submit content removal requests. Internet access was partially restored the following day, although social media platforms remained blocked. On 14 February 2021, Telenor announced it was no longer permitted to publicly disclose the directives received from military authorities on internet disruptions. Starting on 15 February 2021, the military authorities initiated an internet outage nationwide again from 1:00 to 9:00 a.m. daily.

Additional internet shutdowns were also reported on 22 and 26 February 2021 in some locations. Mytel, partly shared by the military, was seemingly not affected by the shutdowns.

On 1 April 2021, the military council commanded to the wifi internet service providers to cut wireless broadband internet, with fixed-line connections which are disconnected from 1AM to 9AM being the only avenue left to access the internet.

=== Arrests and charges ===
Law enforcement authorities have acted swiftly in quelling opposition to the coup. As of 7 February 2021, 152 people were under detention in relation to the coup d'état.

The military regime has begun initiating criminal proceedings against detainees. On 3 February 2021, Thawbita, a Buddhist monk, was sentenced to two years in prison under Section 66(d) of the Telecommunications Law, for defamation of the military. On 4 February 2021, three university students, Zu Zu Zan, Aung Myo Ko, and Htoo Khant Thaw, were charged under Section 19 of the Peaceful Assembly and Peaceful Procession Law for protesting in Mandalay. On 5 February 2021, Maung Gyi, the chair of the United Nationalities Democratic Party, was arrested, charged and sentenced to two years under Penal Code Section 505(b) for staging a protest in Hpa-an Township, Kayin State. Cho Yu Mon, a school principal, was also arrested and charged under Penal Code Section 505(b) for taking part in a "red ribbon" campaign at her school in Hpa-an. NLD leader Win Htein was charged under Section 124(a) of Myanmar's legal code for sedition.

On 6 February, Sean Turnell, the Australian economic policy advisor to the NLD-led civilian government and a Macquarie University professor, was detained, becoming the first known foreign national to be arrested in relation to the coup.

On 8 February 2021, authorities re-arrested Nang Khin Htwe Myint, Kayin State's chief minister, and Myint Naing, Sagaing Region's chief minister. Nang Khin Htwe Myint had published remarks online urging solidarity between soldiers and the people, pointing out that the army was funded by taxes and state funds, while Myint Naing had posted a speech calling on the public to continue protesting. On 9 February, at least a hundred demonstrators were arrested in Mandalay, including mayor Ye Lwin.

On 13 February 2021, authorities have charged and issued arrest warrants under Article 505(b) of the law for seven high-profile individuals, namely Min Ko Naing, Kyaw Min Yu, Mg Mg Aye, Pencilo, Lynn Lynn, Insein Aung Soe, and Myo Yan Naung Thein, for allegedly defaming the state and threatening "public tranquility" through their social media posts.

On 17 February 2021, authorities issued arrest warrants for several celebrities, namely Lu Min, Pyay Ti Oo, Ko Pauk, Na Gyi, Anegga, and Wyne, for encouraging civil servants to join the ongoing civil disobedience movement. More than 1,700 people had been arrested as of 4 March. On 2 April 2021, eleven individuals were arrested in Yangon after answering questions from a CNN television crew which had received permission to report in Myanmar, with three of these individuals still held as of 19 April 2021.

On 3 March 2021, Associated Press journalist Thein Zaw and five other media workers were charged over their coverage of the protests, with a potential maximum penalty of three years imprisonment. On 24 March 2021, Thein Zaw was released from Insein Prison near Yangon, with all charges dropped.

On 15 April 2021, security forces arrested Wai Moe Naing, a member of the Monywa People's Strike Leading Committee and one of the most prominent leaders of the protests, near the town of Monywa.

On 9 May 2021, the body of poet and dissenter Khet Thi was returned to his family, who said that he had died in detention. Many of his internal organs had been removed.

=== Inclusion of opposition political parties ===
The military has made overtures to competing political parties in the aftermath of the coup d'état. On 2 February 2021, it formed the State Administration Council, as Myanmar's interim governing body. The Council's membership included several civilian politicians, including Mahn Nyein Maung, a former member of the Karen National Union, Thein Nyunt, and Khin Maung Swe, co-founders of the National Democratic Force, a splinter group from the NLD. On 3 February 2021, five additional civilian members were added to the Council, including Aye Nu Sein, vice-chair of the Arakan National Party. On 6 February, the Mon Unity Party had announced it had accepted the military's offer to join the Council.

=== Imposition of martial law ===
On 8 February 2021, authorities began imposing martial law across several municipalities until further notice. Martial law effectively institutes a nightly curfew from 8:00 pm to 4:00 am, bans gathering of more than five individuals, public speaking, rallies, and protests. Municipalities covered by martial law include seven townships in Mandalay, and a township in Ayeyarwady Region. Martial law has since been expanded to include several urban townships in Yangon, Shwebo, Monywa, Sagaing, Kalay in Sagaing Region, Bago, and Pharsong in Kayah State, where significant protests had emerged. Martial law has since been expanded to include ninety townships in thirty cities, including all the townships that comprise Yangon.

On 14 February 2021, the military regime suspended security and privacy protections enshrined in Myanmar's constitution until the state of emergency is lifted. The newly passed law enables the Commander-in-Chief to temporarily restrict or suspend the fundamental rights of citizens, including arrests and searches without court-issued warrants, and detentions without court approval. The State Administration Council also enacted Law 3/2021, which requires all residents to register overnight guests outside of their official household with their respective township or ward administrators. The military era law had previously been repealed by the NLD-led government.

=== Use of force ===
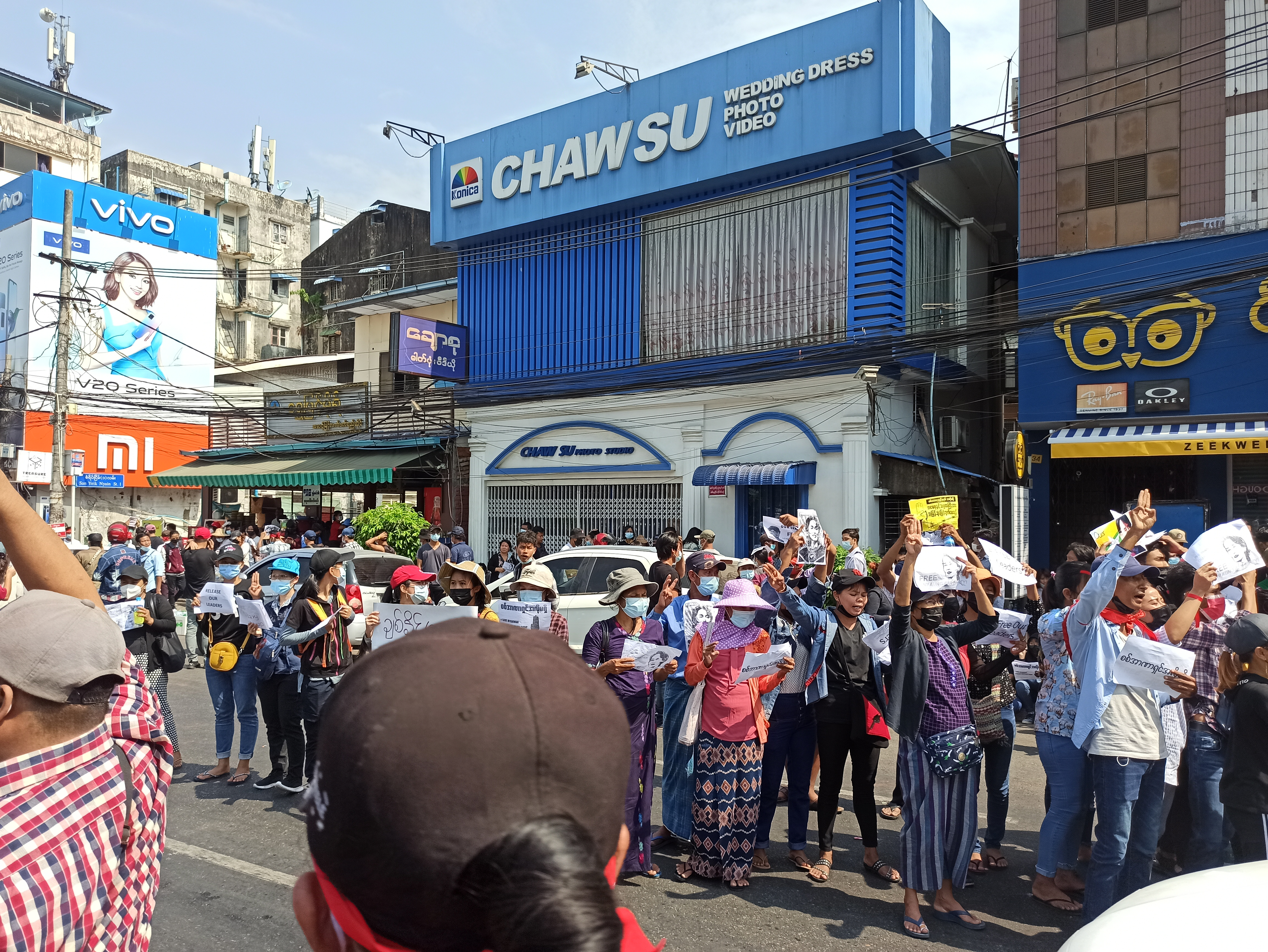
Demonstrators on 8 February 2021 in Yangon

According to the AAPP, as of 3 January 2023, 2,692 protesters have been killed. The junta's indiscriminate use of force has resulted in the deaths of at least 44 children, including a 7-year-old girl who was shot in her home and reports of hundreds of children and young people detained.

On 8 February 2021, police began using rubber bullets, water cannons, and tear gas to disperse protesters at mass rallies. The military leader Min Aung Hlaing ordered a clampdown and suppression of demonstrations as protesters nationwide embarked on a strike. On 9 February two protesters in Naypyidaw were admitted to a local hospital in critical condition, for gunshot wounds. One of these was Mya Thwe Thwe Khine, a twenty-year-old woman, whose death in a hospital on 19 February, became emblematic for the cause of the protesters. In late April, police sources began to claim that the increased violence from apparently among their ranks had actually been the work of military personnel and paramilitary thugs in police uniform, as well as of "trigger-happy new police recruits".

On 20 February 2021, two protesters were killed and at least two dozen more were injured in Mandalay by the police and military in a violent crackdown. These people were residents of Maha Aung Myay Township guarding government shipyard workers involved in the civil disobedience movement from the police, who were forcing them back to work. In addition to firing live rounds, the police and military personnel also threw rocks, arrested, and used water cannons on civilians, in addition to severely beating many. Despite international reactions to this incident, the military junta warned protesters that they were willing to continue using such lethal force, and instead claimed that it was the protesters who were "inciting the people [...] to a confrontation path". In spite of these threats, huge crowds gathered on 22 February, with some protesters saying that the recent killings had made them more determined to continue protesting.

On 25 February, reports showed that police opened fire and used flash bang grenades into a group of residents in Tamwe township protesting the military appointment to replace an administrator in one ward.

The intensity of the interventions by authorities increased at the beginning of March, with reports of at least 18 fatalities on 28 February according to reports of Human Rights Groups, and an additional 38 on 3 March, with UN special envoy Christine Schraner Burgener describing the day "as the bloodiest since the coup happened". Warnings of possible further sanctions were reportedly met with indifference.

On 4 March 2021, 19-year-old Kyal Sin was shot in the head during an anti-coup rally, in which security forces fired live rounds to disperse the demonstration.

One incident of violence against emergency services personnel was recorded by CCTV and shared on social media, in which an ambulance in the North Okkakapa Township, Yangon was stopped at gunpoint by armed police, and the three volunteer medics were forced out of their vehicles and repeatedly hit in the head with rifle butts and kicked by six police officers, followed by the officers shooting out the windows of the ambulance. The three medics were then detained and sent to the Insein Prison, known for its inhumane conditions.

On 30 March 2021, numerous airstrikes against protesters in Kayin State were reported. On 9 April, the Assistance Association for Political Prisoners and Myanmar Now reported that security forces had killed more than 80 protesters in Bago by firing rifle grenades at them.

On 11 April, the country surpassed 700 deaths since the protests began, according to the AAPP.

On the same day, a man was shot dead by security forces in Mandalay, becoming the first casualty of the post-ASEAN summit consensus.

On 1 June, the Tatmadaw launched airstrikes on many towns in Sagaing and Kachin State against People's Defence Force resistance group.

On 5 December, five people were run over and killed by a military vehicle in Yangon.

=== Response to use of force ===
The violent use of force by military forces in Mya Thwe Thwe Khaing's death on 9 February sparked national outrage, with celebrities and public figures such as Thandar Hlaing criticising her treatment. Nyi Nyi Tun, the chair of the Myanmar Motion Picture Organisation, stated "We cannot witness any more Mya Thwe Thwe Khaings" and urged the public to join the civil disobedience movement. On 11 February, Mya's sister, Mya Thado Nwe, publicly addressed media outlets, and urged the public to "uproot the military dictatorship" for the sake of future generations.

On 17 February, a 15 m (49 feet) long billboard depicting Mya's shooting was unfurled off of a pedestrian bridge in Downtown Yangon.

On 1 March, the CRPH designated the State Administration Council as a terrorist group in response to the violent crackdown on anti-coup protesters on 28 February.

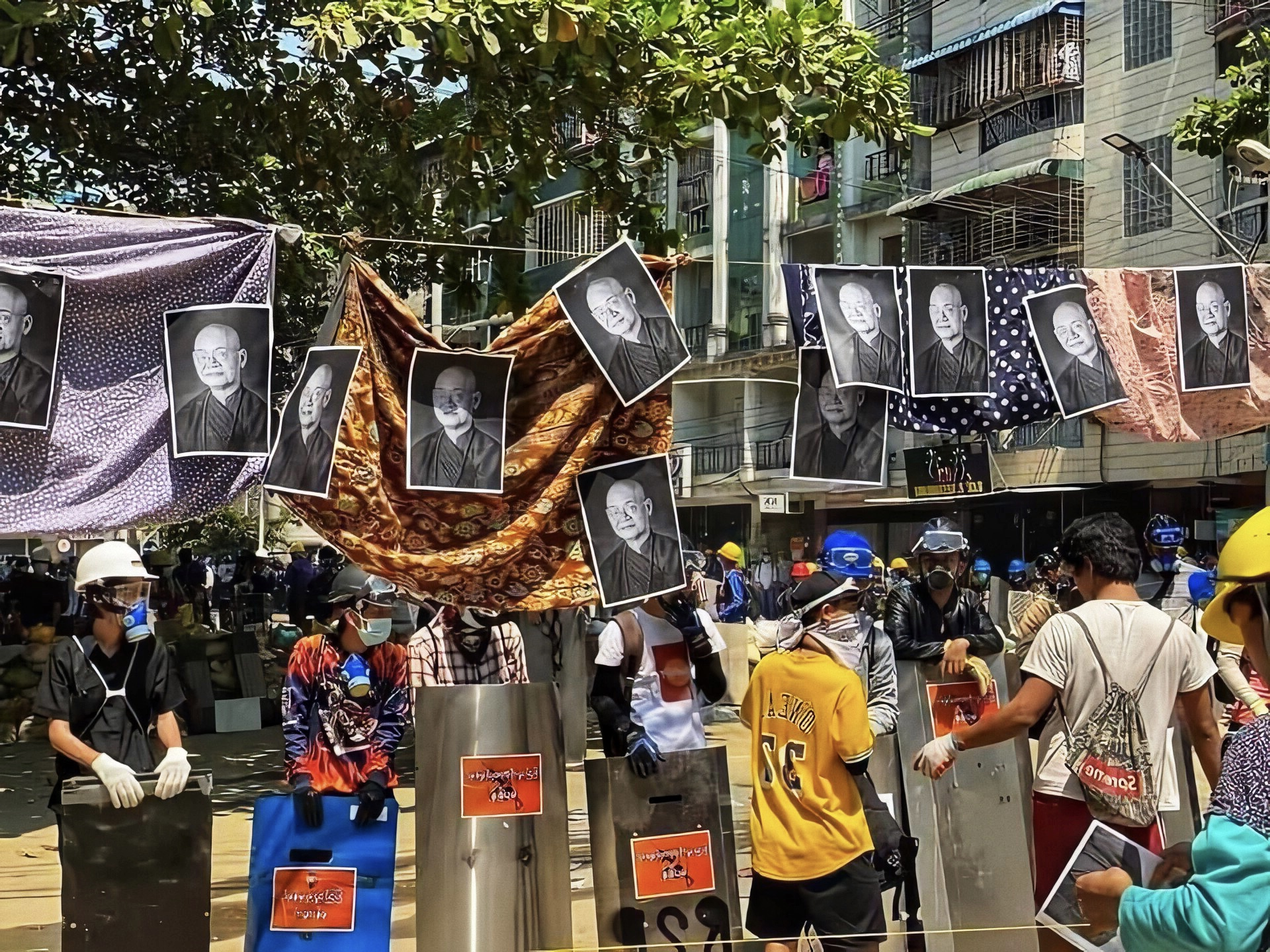
Protesters hung Vasipake Sayadaw's pictures with woman's htameins

Vasipake Sayadaw, an influential monk and astrologer who having a close relationship with Senior General Min Aung Hlaing. He has been accused of providing the coup leader with his astrological advice for the takeover. He was reportedly blamed for advising the senior general to tell security forces to shoot protesters in the head. Most of the people killed over the last month were hit in their heads.

The Shwekyin Nikāya, Burma's second largest Buddhist monastic order, has also urged Min Aung Hlaing to immediately cease the assaults on unarmed civilians and to refrain from engaging in theft and property destruction. Its leading monks reminded the general to be a good Buddhist, which entailed keeping to the Five Precepts required for at least a human rebirth. (Note: This letter, released in March, gained notoriety for the discrepancies between its signed original draft and its final version, the latter which appears to have legitimized Min Aung Hlaing's rule through a veiled reference to him as king. The Burmese word for 'king', min (Burmese: မင်း, MLCTS: mang:), coincides with the first syllable of the general's name, even in the Burmese script.) In March 2021, the State Saṅghamahānāyaka Committee issued a draft statement calling on the SAC to end the violence against protesters, itself vowing to halt its administrative activities in solidarity. On 14 March, it was reported that Bhaddanta Kumārabhivaṁsa (ဘဒ္ဒန္တကုမာရဘိဝံသ), the committee's head, had consequently been detained. Other members as well of the Burmese monastic community have spoken out against the violence and in general opposition to the coup.

=== Military deployment and occupation of buildings ===
On 14 February, the military deployed armoured trucks and vehicles in the regional capitals of Yangon, Sittwe, and Myitkyina. Soldiers were also deployed on city streets to aid police, including members of the 77th Light Infantry Division. In Yangon, soldiers were deployed to stand behind riot police.

On 7 March, state-run media and human rights groups confirmed the occupation of public hospitals, universities and temple compounds by security forces. Public hospitals had been staffed by medical personnel after initially being vacated over the Civil Disobedience Movement, "in response to escalating violence against peaceful protestors" according to not-for-profit human rights NGO Physicians for Human Rights. Hospitals confirmed to be occupied include the Yangon General Hospital and Gandhi Hospital.

=== Pro-military groups ===
In the lead-up to the coup, pro-military protesters had begun rallying in an attempt to de-legitimise the results of the 2020 elections. Wai Wai Nu of the Women's Peace Network noted the potential for violent attacks on pro-democracy protesters by pro-military protesters.

On 30 December, approximately 400 pro-military protesters and nationalists demonstrated in front of Yangon City Hall, in violation of COVID-19 guidelines. On 14 January, about a thousand protesters gathered in Mandalay's Pyawbwe Township to dispute election results, waving military flags.

On 2 February 2021, the day after the coup, pro-military protesters and nationalist groups such as the Yeomanry Development Party (YDP) and Patriotic Myanmar Monks Network rallied in Yangon. On 8 February, a group of pro-military protesters rallied at Sule Pagoda.

On 9 February, a group of pro-military instigators arrived at a protest site in Yangon in 15 unmarked vehicles, seeking to provoke violence. Many brandished large wooden clubs, and were otherwise indistinguishable from pro-democracy protesters. On 18 February, monks who are members of the Patriotic Young Monks Union, an ultranationalist group, were seen vandalizing cars that were staged in a "broken down cars" campaign.

On 25 February, pro-military supporters marched through central Yangon and openly attacked bystanders, residents and anti-coup protestors using sharp objects, knives, heavy sticks and slingshots, wounding four people seriously in the head and the other eight in other parts of the body. Attacks were also directed against members of the press and cars.

=== Control of media ===
==== Proposed cybersecurity law ====
On 9 February, a 36-page draft cybersecurity law was circulated to Myanmar's mobile operators and telecoms licence holders for industry feedback. The draft bill would make internet providers accountable for preventing or removing content that "cause[s] hatred, destroy unity and tranquility". A coalition of 150 civil service organisations publicly denounced the bill for violating the fundamental rights to freedom of expression, data protection, privacy, and other democratic norms in the digital space. They also criticised granting state authorities the ability to ban unfavorable content, restrict ISPs, and intercept data. On 15 February, Union of Myanmar Federation of Chambers of Commerce and Industry urged authorities not to rush into enacting the law, noting that the law could negatively impact Myanmar's digital growth and hinder foreign investments.

On 11 February, hundreds of protesters gathered at the Embassy of China in Yangon, based on online rumours that China had brought in telecommunications equipment and IT experts to Myanmar via recent flights. The Chinese embassy published a statement from the China Enterprises Chamber of Commerce in Myanmar which claimed that recent cargo flights had transported only goods like seafood, and denied allegations of helping Myanmar build an internet firewall.

==== Media blackout ====
Since the coup on 1 February 2021, authorities have blocked popular news channels, including free-to-air channels like the Democratic Voice of Burma and Mizzima TV, as well as foreign news channels, including CNN from the United States, NHK from Japan, and the BBC from the United Kingdom. On 7 February, the regime also blocked The New York Times, The Wall Street Journal, The Economist and two wire services, the Associated Press and Reuters. A Myanmar Press Council representative has expressed concern over the future of freedom of the press in the country, the public's right to access information, and the future of Myanmar's nascent news organisations. Satellite dishes have been banned in certain regions from early March to prevent access to foreign media.

Domestic privately owned radio and TV stations have been suspended, with only entertainment permitted to be broadcast.

Several journalists and reporters have been attacked while reporting at pro-military demonstrations, and others including Associated Press journalist Thein Zaw have been arrested and charged under a public order law with a maximum penalty of three years in prison, punishing anyone who "causes fear among the public, knowingly spreads false news, or agitates directly or indirectly for a criminal offense against a government employee", with the penalty having been increased by the junta from two years in February; on 24 March 2021, Thein Zaw was released from Insein Prison near Yangon, with all charges dropped.

On 9 March 2021, five independent media outlets Mizzima, Democratic Voice of Burma (DVB), Khit Thit Media, Myanmar Now and 7Day News were shut down after their licences were revoked by the military; the previous day, Myanmar Now was raided by police, with computers, parts of their data server, and equipment seized.

On 2 April 2021, eleven individuals were arrested in Yangon for answering questions by a CNN television crew which had received permission to report in Myanmar.

In August 2024 CNN published its research that despite the government's control over the media, social media is the main platform used by those who have reached dire economic situation. Many individuals' resort to extreme measures, including participating in the illicit trade of human organs online. People frequently advertise their intention to sell organs on social media, leading to a continuous cycle where families repeatedly resort to these sales as their financial resources dwindle.

==== Spread of misinformation ====
Unsubstantiated rumours of Suu Kyi's release had circulated, which was falsely attributed to and denied by Radio Free Asia; this rumour is reported to have been shared by the military-run Myawaddy TV, and triggered street celebrations and fireworks. An imposter website mimicking Radio Free Asia was set up, posting false articles "about COVID-19, the Muslim Rohingya community, as well as slurs against leader Aung San Suu Kyi and her ruling National League for Democracy".

Additionally, the military hired Ari Ben-Menashe – a lobbyist who formerly worked for Robert Mugabe, but also other military juntas and presidential candidates in countries including Venezuela, Tunisia and Kyrgyzstan – in an attempt to rebrand itself, claiming that the coup was launched "to prevent the civilian-led government from drifting further into China's orbit".

To counter the spread of misinformation, in February Facebook issued a blanket ban on all pages relating to Myanmar's military, as well as state media network Myanmar Radio and Television (MRTV). On 5 March, YouTube announced it would remove five military-run YouTube channels and several videos "in accordance with our community guidelines and applicable laws". TikTok announced it had removed content which had received "tens of thousands of views" of uniformed men threatening to harm protesters.

==== Arrest of journalists and TV personalities ====
On 3 April 2021, police arrested popular actor Ye Deight under section 505 (a) of the penal code. On 6 April, military authorities issued arrest warrants against dozens of celebrities, models and influencers, and a popular comedian was arrested in Yangon, according to Mizzima News. One of the wanted journalists is Sithu Aung Myint, who wrote from his Facebook page that "he was proud" to be on the wanted list. On 8 April, troops arrested popular actor, model and actor Paing Takhon for openly opposing the military government and expressing support for the protesters. He was arrested at his home in Yangon after eight military trucks arrived to their residence. The arrests were conducted without resistance, according to Takhon's mother, due to Takhon being in poor health. Other 120 celebrities were also issued arrest warrants. On 19 April 2021, Reporters Without Borders reported that at least 19 journalists, actors, singers, and social media personalities were on a wanted list of "those spreading news to affect state stability", with names, Facebook account details, profile photos, and addresses of the individuals present. The same day at 8:00 PM, prominent beauty blogger Win Min Than was also arrested at the BH Hotel in Taunggyi a few hours after the military council announced that she had been charged.

On 13 May 2021, Min Nyo of the Democratic Voice of Burma was sentenced to three years in prison for his coverage of the protests. His employer and family allege he was "brutally beaten" by police and denied family visits. He had been arrested on 3 March. He became the first journalist to be sentenced under the junta.

In May 2021, three journalists and two activists who escaped from Myanmar were arrested in Thailand for illegally entering the country. If found guilty, they could be deported back to Myanmar, where they allege their lives may be in danger. On 16 May 2021, Thai Prime Minister Prayuth Chan-ocha promised UN special envoy Christine Schraner Burgener that the Thai government will not force those fleeing violence to return to Myanmar.

== Protests ==
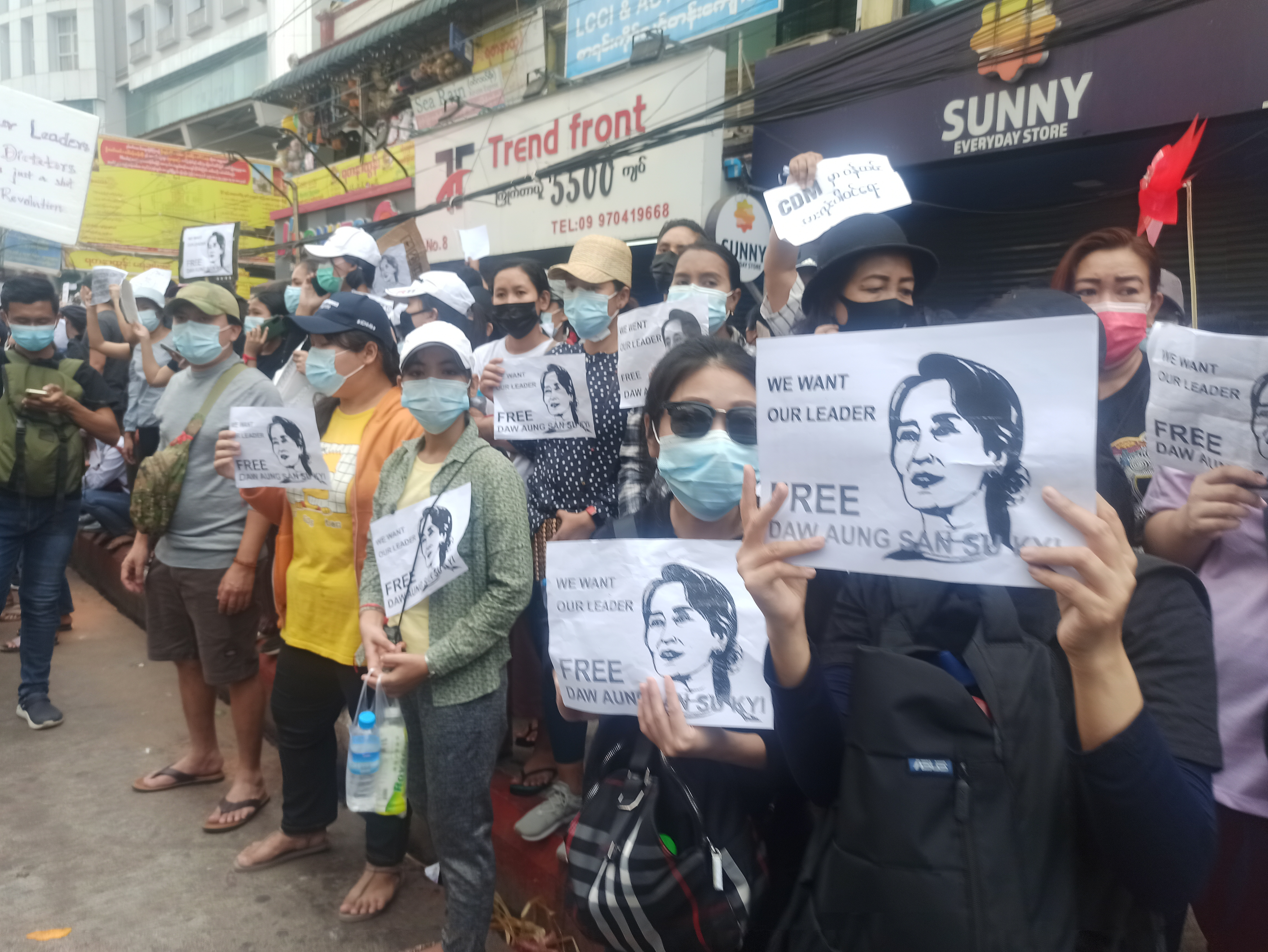
Protesters in Yangon carrying signs reading "Free Daw Aung San Suu Kyi" on 8 February 2021

In the lead-up to the coup, pro-military protesters had begun rallying in an attempt to de-legitimise the results of the 2020 elections. On 2 February the first protest was made against the coup and four arrests were made on 4 February when thirty citizens protested against the coup d'état, in front of the University of Medicine in Mandalay.

Within a week, public protests had grown in size and spread to other cities across the country. The largest protests in Yangon attracted at least 150,000 protesters, gathering at the Hledan junction and around Sule Pagoda in Downtown Yangon. Protesters defied martial law, and continued to organise larger public protests across the country. Police began a crackdown of protests, firing live and rubber bullets, and using water cannons to disperse the crowds causing serious injuries in some cases. Conversely some rallies were held in support of the State Administration Council.

By mid February there were reports of fatalities among civilians, notably the death of Mya Thwe Thwe Khine at a hospital, ten days after having been shot in the head. On 8 March 2021, approximately two hundred protestors were besieged in Sanchaung, Yangon, as stun grenades and live ammunition were used by security forces, prompting calls from the United Nations and British Embassy in Myanmar asking security forces to withdraw.

On 14 March, there were arson attacks on Chinese-run factories in the industrial district of Hlaing Tha Yar, Yangon. State media attributed it to protesters, while others said security forces lit the fires, but no group claimed responsibility. Security forces killed 38 protestors that day.

The most violent day of the protests came on 27 March, the annual Armed Forces Day holiday. At least 114 civilians were reported to have been killed, the highest death toll of any individual day.

Protests continued in April and May, and young protesters held "lightning strike" flash marches against the military in the districts of Yangon.

On 6 June, thousands of protesters took to the streets in Yangon and across Myanmar, calling for a "spring revolution". Security forces cracked down on protesters in Hsipaw, killing at least two people.

On 19 June, protests divided the country between those celebrating Suu Kyi's 76th birthday and pro-military protesters across the country. The name of pro-Suu Kyi protests was chosen as "Flower Protests" due to the use of flowers on her clothing by Suu Kyi.

On 8 August, protests took place across Myanmar against the junta on the anniversary of the 1988 uprising. Many protesters chanted "The old debt from 88, we must get it all in 2021".

On 2 December 2021, the Human Rights Watch reported that Myanmar security forces deliberately kettled protesters and used lethal force during anti-junta protests in Yangon's Hlaingthaya Township on 14 March 2021. Soldiers and police killed at least 65 protesters and bystanders while firing on trapped protesters and on those trying to assist the wounded.

On 5 December 2021, five people were killed and at least 15 arrested after Myanmar security forces in a car, rammed into an anti-coup protest in Yangon.

In February 2022, The Guardian newspaper reported about a series of poems written both by Rohingya and other Myanmar authors, expressing their suffering and opposition to atrocities committed by the country's military.

== Armed resistance ==
Military situation in Myanmar as of 28 May 2024

In mid 2021, armed insurgencies by the People's Defence Force of the National Unity Government, alongside Ethnic Armed Organisations, erupted throughout Myanmar in response to the military government's crackdown on anti-coup protests.

== International reactions ==
=== Public positions ===
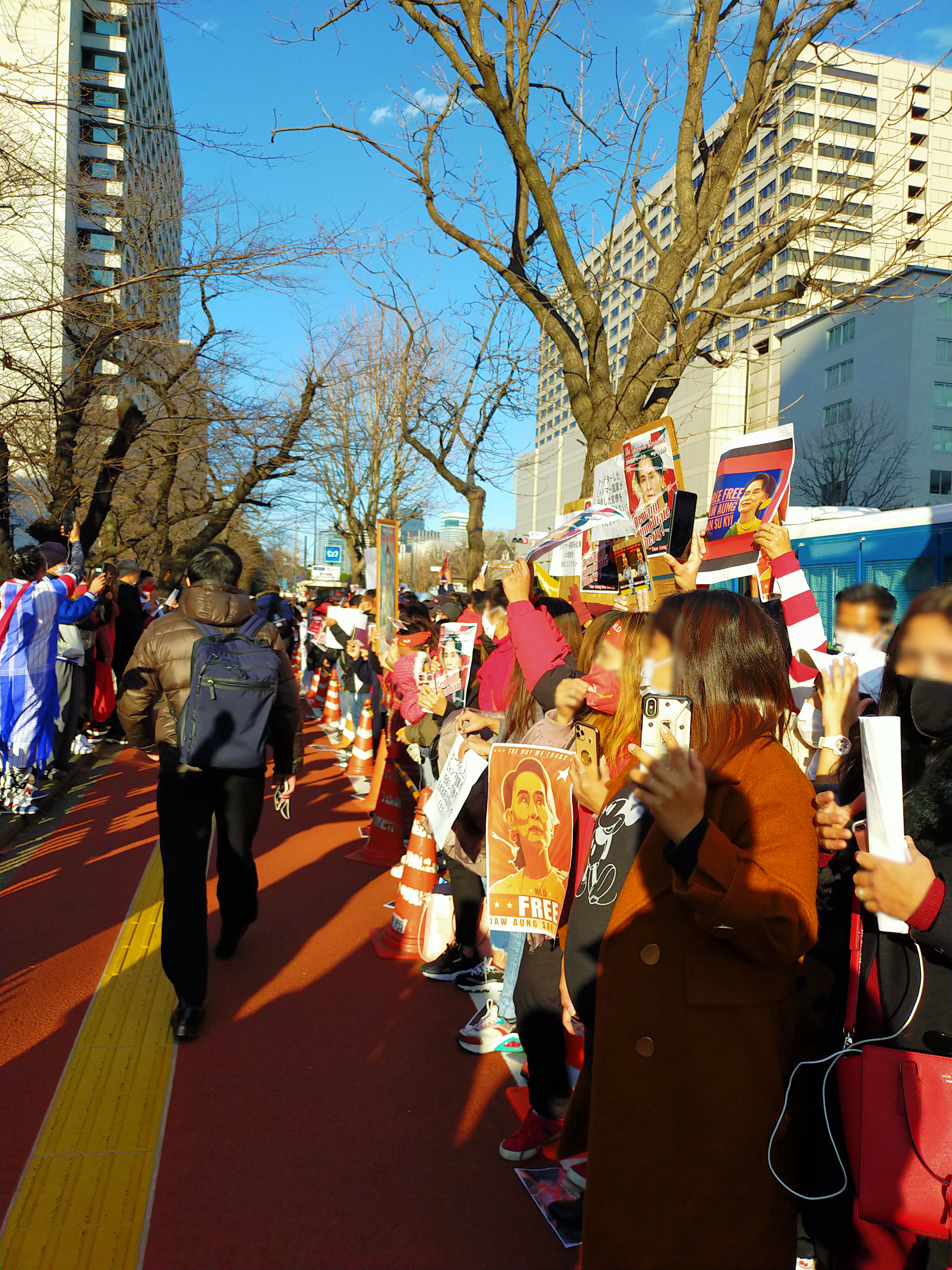
3,000 protesters asking for Aung San Suu Kyi's release in Kasumigaseki, Tokyo, Japan

During his remarks on 7 February 2021, Pope Francis urged authorities to serve the common good, promote social justice and national stability, and expressed his solidarity with the people of Myanmar. On 17 March, Pope Francis praised Catholic nun, Sister Ann Rosa Nu Tawng, who knelt before security forces in the city of Myitkyina and persuaded them not to shoot protesters. Francis again urged for a peace and concluded his speech saying, "[E]ven I kneel on the streets of Myanmar and say, 'stop the violence.'" On 16 May, Pope Francis referred again about the conflict and said that "the people of Myanmar must not despair in the face of evil or allow themselves to be divided" and denounced the coup. On 20 June, Francis appealed to the military leaders to allow and to reach the displaced, hungry people and those who have fled the conflict. Francis expressed his support for the Burmese Catholic bishops asking for humanitarian corridors for those who have had to leave their homes since the coup.

On 16 February 2021, during a parliamentary address, Singaporean foreign minister Vivian Balakrishnan expressed alarm regarding violent clashes at protests, arrests of civil servants, internet blackouts and troop deployments and armoured vehicles in city streets, and urged authorities to exercise "utmost restraint". UK prime minister Boris Johnson condemned the coup, tweeting "We stand with the people of Myanmar and will ensure those responsible for this coup are held to account," while the US denounced the death of protesters in Myanmar, where the State Department spokesman Ned Price stated that the country condemned the use of force against demonstrators. The European Union and Canada released a statement saying, "We support the people of Myanmar in their quest for democracy, freedom, peace and prosperity. The world is watching".

The use of deadly force against protesters also drew condemnations from the French foreign ministry and the UN, who described such incidents as unacceptable and urged the military to immediately cease such violence. On 21 February, Facebook also announced the suspension of the military's main page, saying that "the army had breached its standards prohibiting the incitement of violence." On 25 February, all accounts of Tatmadaw and its related media entities were banned from Facebook and Instagram, citing the "exceptionally severe human rights abuses" and a future risk of "military-initiated violence".

On 19 April 2021, the European Union expanded sanctions to 35 individuals and the state-owned firms Myanmar Economic Corporation and Myanmar Economic Holding Limited, with sanctions including asset freezes and travel bans.

==== United Nations ====
On 9 February, reports of injured protesters prompted Ola Almgren, the UN Resident Coordinator and Humanitarian Coordinator in Myanmar to issue a statement condemning the authority's violent use of force. On 10 February, Thomas Andrews, the United Nations Special Rapporteur on the situation of human rights in Myanmar, mentioned her on Twitter and urged solidarity with the protests. On 11 February, UN Women expressed its condolences to Mya's family and called "on the military and police to refrain from using disproportionate force against demonstrators".

On 14 February, UN Secretary General António Guterres issued a statement expressing deep concern about the situation in Myanmar, highlighting "the increasing use of force and the reported deployment of additional armoured vehicles to major cities". He urged Myanmar's military and police to fully respect the right of peaceful assembly and ensure that demonstrators are not subjected to reprisals. He also called reports of violence, intimidation and harassment by security personnel "unacceptable".

On 9 April, Myanmar's UN envoy Kyaw Moe Tun furtherly condemned the junta and called for international intervention and the imposition of a "no-fly zone". He also regretted the alleged "lack of adequate and strong action by the international community, especially the UN Security Council."

On 13 April 2021, UN High Commissioner for Human Rights Michelle Bachelet warned of possible crimes against humanity and said it seemed to be heading towards a massive conflict like the one ravaging Syria. Bachelet stated that "[I] fear the situation in Myanmar is heading towards a full-blown conflict. States must not allow the deadly mistakes of the past in Syria and elsewhere to be repeated."

The United Nations General Assembly said on 17 May 2021 that Liechtenstein had introduced a measure to resolution calling for 'an immediate suspension' of the transfer of weapons to the military junta of Myanmar. The draft is supported by the European Union, the United Kingdom and the United States. The sole Asian country to co-sponsor this move is South Korea. It also demands the military to "end the state of emergency" and immediately stop "all violence against peaceful demonstrators". It also calls for the immediate and unconditional release of President Win Myint, State Counsellor Aung San Suu Kyi and everyone who has been 'arbitrarily detained, charged or arrested' since the 1 February coup. The draft also urges to implement the five point consensus reaches at the last ASEAN summit and is expected to be treated in person at the UN on 18 May 2021. The next day, it was announced that the treatment of the draft had been indefinitely postponed due to lack of support.

On 27 July 2021, U.N. Special Rapporteur Tom Andrews urged the U.N. Security Council and member states to advance a "COVID Ceasefire" in Myanmar. At the time of his report, over 600 healthcare professionals were eluding outstanding arrest warrants and 67 had already been detained in the midst of soaring COVID-19 infections and deaths throughout the country.

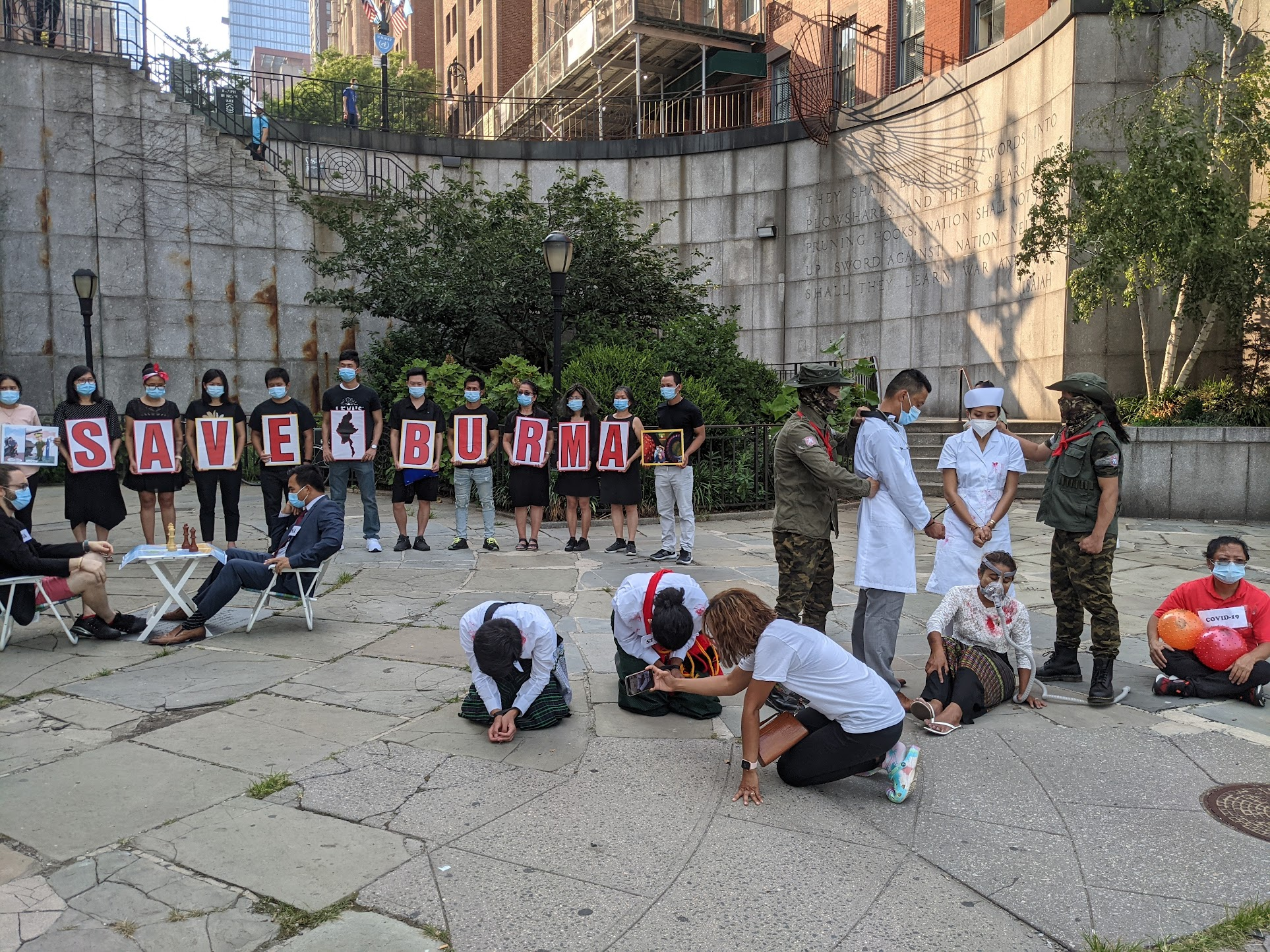
Protest in favor of a Myanmar "COVID ceasefire" on 27 July 2021, across from the United Nations in New York, NY.

==== ASEAN ====
On 16 April, ASEAN (of which Myanmar is a member) announced an ASEAN Leaders Meeting where Min Aung Hlaing would address the ongoing situation for the first time since taking power. The bloc is divided by countries pushing for action (Indonesia, Malaysia, the Philippines, and Singapore) and other countries with more neutral or supportive stances such as Cambodia, Laos, Thailand, and Vietnam. On 18 April, the NUG asked to be invited to the meeting and called on ASEAN member states to not recognize the junta government. A deputy for foreign affairs of the NUG said that ASEAN should negotiate with the NUG, as it "is supported by the people and has complete legitimacy." Members of the NUG were reported to have been in contact with ASEAN leaders, but were not formally invited to the meeting.

On 24 April, Min Aung Hlaing attended the special ASEAN Leaders Meeting in Jakarta along with other member states' heads of government and foreign ministers, where he was urged to stop violent crackdowns on protesters. ASEAN released a statement that it had agreed to a "five-point consensus" with Min Aung Hlaing on the cessation of violence in Myanmar, constructive dialogue among all parties concerned, and the appointment of a special envoy by ASEAN to facilitate the dialogue process. Demonstrations against him, the coup and asking for restoration of democracy gathered in the streets near the ASEAN Secretariat, where the meeting was held. There have been calls to either suspend or expel Myanmar from ASEAN, though ASEAN member states are prohibited by the Treaty of Amity and Cooperation (TAC) from interfering in the internal affairs of other members. Later on the same day, a consensus was announced by group chair Brunei where five points were to be met: ending violence, a constructive dialogue among all parties, a special ASEAN envoy to facilitate the dialogue, acceptance of aid and a visit by the envoy to Myanmar. There was no mention, however, of political prisoners. Burmese state media also reported that the country would closely cooperate with various issues, including "the political transition in Myanmar, and the process that will be implemented in the future". The consensus was strongly criticized by pro-democracy activists who vowed to continue their protests. Khin Sandar of the General Strikes Collaboration Committee vowed to continue protests, saying that ASEAN and the UN merely speak as outsiders whose declarations do not reflect the situation on the ground. Outcry over the TAC-guided consensus was also reported on social media.

In May 2021, the Philippines welcomed the United Nations Security Council support to facilitate a peaceful ending to the crisis in the country. The Ministry of Foreign Affairs of that country called for the release of all political prisoners, including Aung San Suu Kyi and President Win Myint. Previously, the Security Council had welcomed the ASEAN consensus on the situation in Myanmar.

==== United States ====
On 4 February, the Federal Reserve blocked the transfer of $1 billion held in the Federal Reserve Bank of New York, after an attempt to transfer the funds in the name of the Central Bank of Myanmar. On 10 February, U.S. President Joe Biden said the United States was "taking steps to prevent the generals from improperly having access to the one billion dollars in Burmese government funds", signing an executive order to freeze assets and sanction military leaders involved in the coup, and stated "as protests grow, violence against those asserting their democratic rights is unacceptable, and we're going to keep calling it out. The people of Burma are making their voices heard. And the world is watching."

On 5 March, due to protest deaths, U.S. Secretary of State Antony Blinken announced sanctions and export controls against Myanmar's ministry of defence, ministry of home affairs, and the two state-owned firms Myanmar Economic Corporation and Myanmar Economic Holding Limited, in order "to constrain the Burmese military regime's access to U.S. goods and technology". Blinken called for the "restoration of democracy in Burma".

On 29 March, the United States announced they would suspend all trade engagement under a 2013 trade and investment agreement. A day later on 30 March, the Department of State ordered the departure of non-emergency employees from Myanmar.

==== United Kingdom ====
On 1 April, the British Foreign Secretary Dominic Raab condemned the coup again and announced economic sanctions on Burmese conglomerate Myanmar Economic Corporation (MEC) over funding of the military and association with military officials. Raab further stated that the junta had "sunk to a new low with the wanton killing of innocent civilians, including children". Later, U.S. Secretary of State Antony Blinken welcomed the United Kingdom's move. On 7 April, Myanmar's ambassador to the United Kingdom Kyaw Zwar Minn was locked out of the London embassy after criticizing Myanmar's ruling authorities.

On 19 July, aid from UNHCR arrived at Mindat as a response to the refugee crisis. However, military restrictions diverted many of these resources away from the civilians who needed them.

On 1 February 2024, the Foreign, Commonwealth and Development Office (FCDO) of the United Kingdom took action by imposing further sanctions on Myanmar. These sanctions were implemented in response to the ongoing human rights violations occurring in the country. Specifically, the sanctions targeted entities with ties to the military that have been directly involved in the repression of the civilian population and the commission of serious human rights violations in Myanmar, a nation situated in Southeast Asia. Furthermore, the British government previously imposed sanctions on 25 individuals and 33 entities in Myanmar.

=== Protests outside Myanmar ===
A group of Burmese expatriates and hundreds of Thai pro-democracy activists protested the coup at the Burmese embassy at Sathon Nuea Road in Bangkok, Thailand on 1 February, shortly after the coup. Some protesters reportedly gave the three-finger salute, the symbol which was used during the protests which called for democracy in Thailand. The protest ended with a police crackdown; two protestors were injured and hospitalised, and two others were arrested.

On 1 February, Burmese citizens in Tokyo, Japan gathered in front of the United Nations University to protest against the coup. On 26 May 2021, Tokyo planned to allow two Myanmar diplomats to stay longer because they publicly announced their participation in the anti-coup movements and their visas were set to expire on 15 July 2021. On 18 June 2021, Myanmar national football goalkeeper Pyae Lyan Aung told a Japanese Immigration Services Agency (ISA) officer that he decided to stay in Osaka after he gave the three-finger salute during a match held in Japan last month.

In South Korea on 6 February, Burmese citizens rallied in front of the Myanmar embassy to protest against the coup, and they held more rallies four times a week from 6 February until 1 March.

The Singapore Police Force has issued warnings to foreigners who are planning to participate in anti-coup protests in Singapore. On 14 February 2021, SPF officers arrested three foreigners for protesting at the outskirts of the Myanmar embassy without permits to participate in public assemblies. The Public Security Police Force of Macau has warned Myanmar residents that they are not allowed to conduct anti-coup protests because Article 27 of the Macao Basic Law only allows Macanese residents to protest.

In the United States on 3 February, more than 150 Burmese Americans protested in front of the Embassy of Myanmar in Washington, D.C. On 6 March 2021, protesters in Tennessee, United States, gathered at the Tennessee State Capitol in Nashville and then, they held a march in order to encourage leaders in the U.S. and Tennessee to impose sanctions on the Burmese military. Protests were held in other cities with sizeable Burmese populations, such as on 27 February in the Dallas suburb of Lewisville.

In Australia on 1 March, some Burmese Australians protested near the Parliament House in Perth to seek justice and urge the Australian government to support the protesters in Myanmar. On 6 March, protesters in Sydney gathered in solidarity with protesters in Myanmar.

In Malaysia, Hein Htet Aung, who plays for second-division Malaysia Premier League club Selangor FC II, flashed the three-finger salute in a match against PDRM FC on early March. He was banned from playing a game against Perak FC II. On 31 March, some Malaysians associated with Milk Tea Alliance gathered outside the embassy to condemn violence against protesters.

According to Kyaw Moe Tun, Myanma ambassador to the UN, eleven other Myanma diplomats stationed in the US, Switzerland, Canada, France, Germany, Israel and Japan are planning to seek temporary protected status as they refuse to move back to Myanmar.

== See also ==
- Myanmar civil war (2021–present)
- 2020 Myanmar general election
- 2021 Colombian protests
- List of protests in the 21st century
- 2020–2021 Thai protests
- Taiwan independence movement
- Gaza war protests § Thailand
