= Monywa People's Strike Leading Committee =

Burmese activist organisation

Monywa People’s Strike Steering Committee
- မုံရွာလူထုသပိတ်တိုက်ပွဲ ဦးဆောင်ကော်မတီ
- Formation: 9 February 2021; 5 years ago
- Type: Non-profit organization, Activist group
- Headquarters: Monywa, Sagaing Region
- Location: Myanmar
- Chairman: Wai Moe Naing (Detained)

The Monywa People’s Strike Steering Committee (also known as the Monywa People's Strike Committee) is a pro-democracy activist organization based in Monywa, Sagaing Region, Myanmar. It was formally established on 9 February 2021, shortly after the 2021 Myanmar coup d'état, to lead non-violent resistance and coordinate anti-junta activities in the region.

== History and Formation ==
The committee was founded by 13 core members, with Wai Moe Naing serving as the chairman. Other founding figures and key leaders include Vice-leader Khant Wai Phyo, Than Kyaw Oo (Chairman of Monywa University Students' Union), and executive members such as May Thant Zin (Treasurer) and Aung Kyaw. The organization's primary objective was to coordinate mass strikes and encourage civil servants to join the Civil Disobedience Movement (CDM).

In March 2021, the committee expanded its operations by establishing a 150-member "Defence Team" led by Aung Kyaw and Khant Wai Phyo. This team was tasked with protecting protesters from security forces during demonstrations. According to state-controlled media, the committee's activities were supported by domestic and international donations, totaling approximately 31 million MMK by April 2021.

== Key activities and advocacy ==
Since its inception, the committee has been a central force in the "Spring Revolution," leading street protests and "flash mob" strikes in Monywa. Beyond street demonstrations, the committee plays a vital role in monitoring the humanitarian situation in the region, particularly within the judicial and prison systems.

=== Political prisoner advocacy ===
The committee frequently reports on conditions inside Monywa Prison. In late 2023, it was instrumental in publicizing a hunger strike by over 50 political prisoners who were protesting the seizure of their food and medicine by prison authorities. In mid-2025, the committee alerted the international community regarding the transfer of hundreds of detainees to undisclosed locations, advocating for their safety and legal rights.

=== Coalition work ===
As a member of the General Strike Coordination Body (GSCB), the committee frequently collaborates with international organizations such as ASEAN and the United Nations. It has consistently co-signed petitions calling for targeted sanctions against the military junta and for the diplomatic recognition of the National Unity Government (NUG).

== Leadership and Legal Status ==
Wai Moe Naing, one of the most recognizable faces of the anti-coup movement, was arrested on 15 April 2021. Following his arrest, the State Administration Council filed numerous charges against him and other committee members, including high treason (Section 124), murder (Section 302), and incitement (Section 505-a). As of April 2026, Wai Moe Naing remains in prison, serving cumulative sentences of over 70 years.

The committee continues to operate through collective leadership despite the incarceration of several founding members. It maintains close coordination with other specialized regional groups, including: Monywa-Amyint Road Strike Leading Committee, Monywa Women Strike, Monywa LGBT Strike and All Burma Federation of Student Unions (Monywa District).
