= Gandhi Hospital =

Gandhi Hospital may refer to:

== Afghanistan ==
- Indira Gandhi Children's Hospital, Kabul, Afghanistan

== India ==
- Gandhi Medical College and Hospital, Secunderabad, India
- Indira Gandhi Co-operative Hospital, Kochi, India
- Indira Gandhi Medical College and Hospital, Shimla, India
- Rajiv Gandhi Government General Hospital, Chennai, India
- Rajiv Gandhi Government Women And Children's Hospital, Pondicherry, India

== Iran ==
- Gandhi Hotel Hospital, Tehran, Iran

== Maldives ==
- Indira Gandhi Memorial Hospital, Malé, Maldives
