= Vasipake Sayadaw =

Burmese astrologer and Buddhist monk

Bhaddanta Vimala Ashin Kovida
- ကောဝိဒ

Personal life
- Born: 14 May 1957 (age 69)

Religious life
- Religion: Buddhism
- Denomination: Theravada
- Temple: Thiladhamma Gonethar Tawya Monastery, Keng Tung
- Dharma names: Kovida

Bhaddanta Vimala Ashin Kovida (Burmese: ကောဝိဒ; born 14 May 1957), best known as Vasipake Sayadaw (Burmese: ဝစီပိတ်ဆရာတော်), is a Burmese Buddhist monk, astrologer and occult practitioner. He is believed to be the Senior General Min Aung Hlaing's chief astrological adviser. He is famous for his vow of silence. Vasipake played a major role in the 2021 Myanmar coup d'état.

== Life ==
His origin is very unclear.

Sayadaw is the abbot of Thiladhamma Gonethar Tawya Monastery in Keng Tung. Senior General Min Aung Hlaing has been his follower since 2006, when he was serving as the commander of the Myanmar military's Triangle Region, which oversees eastern Shan State. Some people believed that he was to be Min Aung Hlaing's spiritual cover. He has ties with Sitagu Sayadaw.

In February 2020, Sayadaw was with Min Aung Hlaing and his wife Kyu Kyu Hla when they placed the "Hti" umbrella on top of Bagan's most powerful ancient Htilominlo Temple. The meaning of the temple name is "need the royal umbrella, need the King". He was following in the footsteps of some of Myanmar's most powerful political figures including his predecessor, Senior General Than Shwe. Many people believed that the ceremony was a yadaya and seeking divine blessings for his glory.

Sayadaw has been accused of providing the coup leader Min with his astrological advice for the takeover. He has been accused of advising the senior general to tell security forces to shoot protesters in the head. Most of the anti-regime protesters killed in the early days of the junta crackdown had bullet wounds to the head.

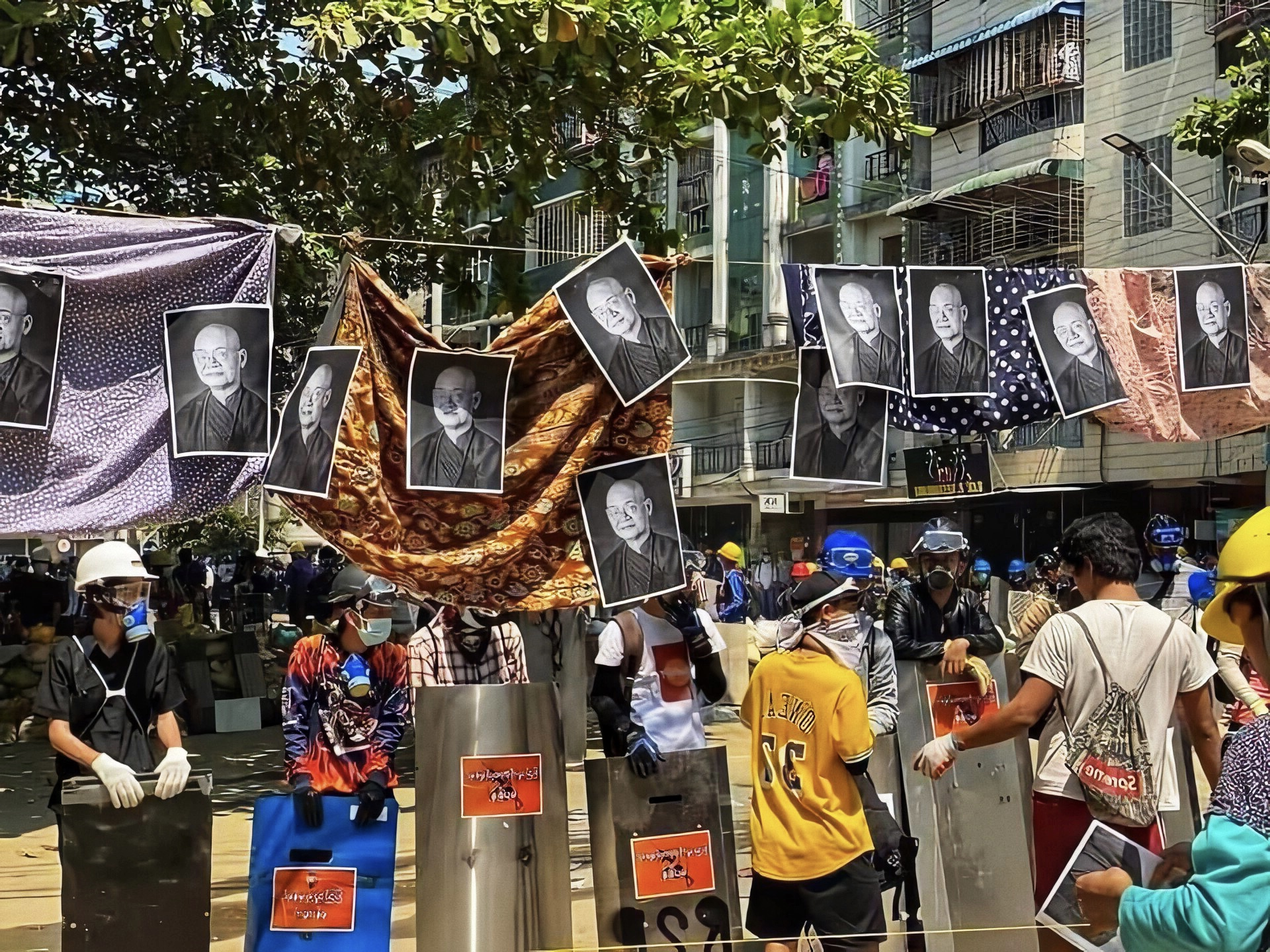
Protesters hung sayadaw's pictures with woman's htameins

He became one of the main targets of the protesters and was singled out for criticism at anti-regime protests, with some protesters attaching photos of him to htamein (women's sarongs) and hanging them in public places to express their wrath. Seeing the pictures of the monk he venerates attached to htamein, Min Aung Hlaing ordered his troops to take the women's garments down and publicly announced in his state-run newspapers that anyone committing the act would be charged with insulting Buddhism.

On 18 December 2021, together with Min Aung Hlaing, he placed a new diamond orb, the highest part of Kyaik Devi Pagoda built by a Mon King centuries ago. Given the presence of his astrological adviser, the Burmese people naturally conclude the aim of the ceremony, in which the general breathed new life into the ancient temple, to seek divine blessings to sustain Min Aung Hlaing's rule in the country.

== Books ==
- ဂုရုကျွန်းတိုင်နှင့် ကံကောင်းခြင်း (December 2009)
- ဆရာသခင်နှင့် ခရီးသွားခြင်း (2010)
- ငှက်တေလေအိုနှင့် ဂန္ထဝင်လွမ်းချင်း (2010)
- ဂြိုဟ်ပြာပြာ (2010)
- ကြံသကာထုပ်လေးများ နောက်ကွယ်မှာ… (2011)
- သဲရဲတိုက် (2011)
