= Wai Moe Naing =

Burmese writer, politician and activist

- ဝေမိုးနိုင်
- Born: 26 September 1995 (age 30); Burma
- Occupations: Writer; politician; activist

Wai Moe Naing (Burmese: ဝေမိုးနိုင်; born 26 September 1995), also known as Monywa Panda (မုံရွာရဲ့ ဝက်ဝံလေး), is a Burmese writer, politician, activist and one of the most prominent leaders of anti-coup movement in Myanmar. He rose to prominence for his role organising daily anti-coup protests in Monywa.

== Literary career ==
At the age of thirteen, his first short story "Pwint Chain Tan Lyin" was published on Phoo Ngone Se Kyaw Thet, a magazine. He wrote several short stories on the local magazines such as Yokeshin Tay Kabyar, Mahaythi, and Yanat Thit.

== Political career ==
Wai Moe Naing is a member of the Monywa People's Strike Leading Committee and the Sagaing Regional Youth Committee. He served the chair of the Monywa University Student Union from 2014 to 2015. On 15 April 2021, he was hit by a car and arrested by the junta's armed forces. He was charged with murder, unlawful assembly, wrongful confinement, abduction with intent to murder, and incitement. During the trial, Wai Moe Naing was forced to represent himself, after his lawyers, were arrested. On 12 August 2022, a military court found him guilty of multiple counts of incitement, which is commonly used by the military junta to target regime critics, and sentenced to 10 years in prison. On 20 October, he was sentenced to an additional 4 years for incitement and violation of COVID-19 restrictions. The sentence has been condemned by PEN America.
