= Frontier Myanmar =

News magazine in Myanmar

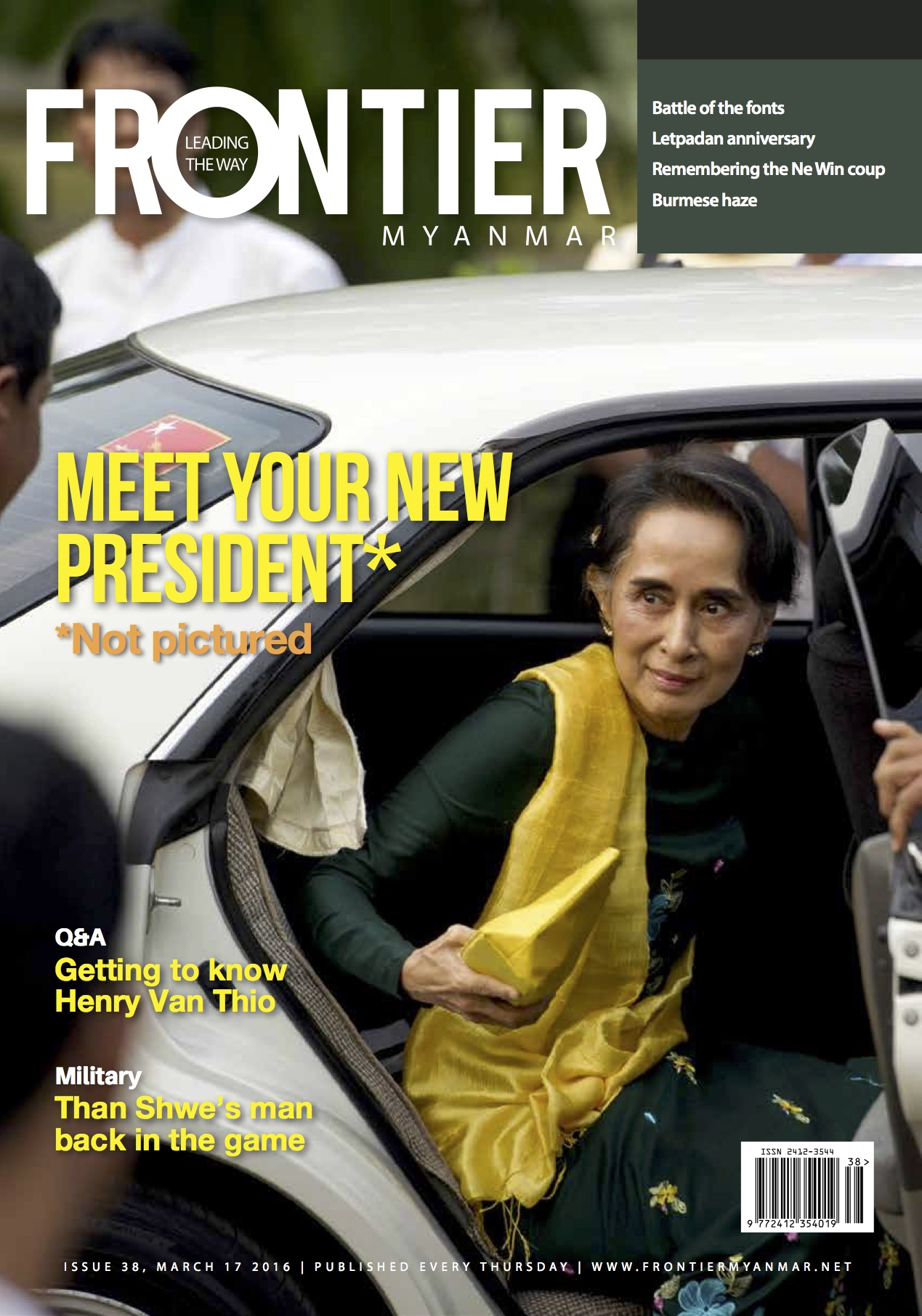
- Frontier Myanmar Issue 38 Cover
- Editor-in-chief: Ben Dunant
- Digital Editor: Clare Hammond
- Online Editor: Nanda
- Editor: Myint Soe
- Photo Editor: Steve Tickner
- Categories: Politics, business
- Frequency: Once every other week
- Publisher: Aung Htin Aung
- Company: Black Knight Media Co. Ltd.
- Country: Myanmar
- Based in: Yangon
- Language: English, Burmese
- Website: www.frontiermyanmar.net

Frontier Myanmar (Burmese: ဖရန်တီးယားမြန်မာ) is a news and business magazine published in Yangon, Myanmar. It is owned by Black Knight Media Co. Ltd which also runs a content marketing agency called Black Knight Media Group. It operates an English language magazine, and a website each in English and Burmese languages. Frontier Myanmar mainly focuses on local politics and business.

== Background ==
Frontier was established by Sonny Swe, a cofounder of The Myanmar Times and the son of a former Military Intelligence officer, who was jailed for his work at the newspaper from 2004 to 2013 after the purge of junta-era Prime Minister Khin Nyunt. Prior to Frontier, Sonny Swe was an investor in Mizzima Media Group alongside business magnate Serge Pun, but both men withdrew from the board in January 2015 citing financial pressures and management conflict with managing director Soe Myint. In October 2025, Sonny Swe stepped down from his role at Frontier. Frontier later appointed Aung Htin Aung as their new CEO.

Launched in July 2015, Frontier is one of the first privately funded English language news publications to open in Myanmar since the government of Thein Sein abolished the country's repressive censorship regime in 2012. Along with Mizzima, it is one of only two English language news weeklies in Myanmar.

Many of Frontier's staff have been drawn from other prominent news organisations in Myanmar, including The Myanmar Times, The Irrawaddy, Mizzima and 7Day News. Thomas Kean, the magazine's editor-in-chief, was previously editor of The Myanmar Times from 2010 to 2016.

=== Myitsone Dam ===
In July 2016, Frontier ran an editorial by Joern Kristensen, a development consultant and former member of the Mekong River Commission, suggesting that the government of Aung San Suu Kyi cancel the controversial and widely unpopular China-backed Myitsone Dam project in Myanmar's north. Later that month, the state-run newspaper Kyemon endorsed Kristensen's proposal and called for a "permanent suspension" of the project, in the first clear indication that the government was considering a cancellation of the $800 million dam since it took office that March.

=== 2021 military coup ===
After the 2021 Myanmar coup d'état, military authorities arrested several Frontier Myanmar journalists, including American-born Danny Fenster and Sithu Aung Myint, as part of its crackdown on independent journalists.

Fenster was detained by authorities in May 2021. Fenster was charged with two crimes, was convicted, and was sentenced to 11 years in jail in November 2021, before he was released to return to the U.S.

Sithu Aung Myint was arrested in August 2021 and sentenced to 10 years in prison for incitement.

== Awards ==
The publication has received numerous regional awards and honourable mentions for its journalistic work.

In May 2018, it received recognition from the 22nd Human Rights Press Awards for a piece on Rohingya refugees in Bangladesh. In June 2018, the magazine won the Society of Publishers in Asia (SOPA) Award for Excellence in Business Reporting, for its article "Funny money" along with several honourable mentions. In August 2021, Fenster, a Frontier Myanmar journalist, received the John Aubuchon Press Freedom Award. In June 2022, Frontier Myanmar won the SOPA Award for Excellence in photography for "The evolution of Myanmar’s Spring Revolution."

== Criticism ==
On 10 February 2026, Myanmar Now published an investigative piece alleging that Frontier Myanmar and The Myanmar Times were influenced by the Tatmadaw through Sonny Swe's father, Brigadier General Thein Swe, until the 2021 coup. Stories were supposedly vetted and censored by military figures, and promotional content of army-linked businesses was published under the guise of news.

Former editor-in-chief, Thomas Kean, denied allegations of military figures bankrolling Frontier Myanmar. He further claimed that the publication was transparent about their ownership. Kean rebutted accusations of military influence by stating Frontier Myanmar covered the Rohingya crisis in a "balanced manner" while other media groups labeled Rohingya as illegal migrants from Bangladesh.

== See also ==
- Media of Burma
- The Myanmar Times
- Mizzima News
