= Win Min Than (blogger) =

Burmese beauty blogger

- ဝင်းမင်းသန်း
- Born: Win Min Than; 1983 (age 42–43); Yangon, Myanmar
- Other names: Ah Win, Glow Nation
- Occupation: Blogger
- Years active: 2013–present
- Awards: Myanmar's Pride Award for Best in Trend (2019)

Win Min Than (Burmese: ဝင်းမင်းသန်း; born 1983), also known as Ah Win (Burmese: အဝင်း) or Glow Nation, is a Burmese beauty blogger. She runs the beauty blog and Facebook page Yangon In My Heart.

Ah Win contributes to several beauty programs on local TV. She is featured in The Myanmar Times's "Top 10 Bloggers" list in 2019. She won the Myanmar's Pride Awards 2019 in the category of Best in Trend.

== Career ==
She learned the fashion while working as a manager at Aldo Group in Toronto, Canada. She created her page in 2013 to share her makeup dos and don'ts. In 2015, she returned to Myanmar with plans to start a beauty blog. As a blogger, she shares information about wearing makeup through Facebook Live. End of the year, she became one of the most popular beauty bloggers in Myanmar.

== As an advocate ==
She is a prominent advocate for LGBT rights and women's issues, fearlessly expressing her beliefs. She garners respect not only from women but also from the LGBTQ+ community. She consistently speaks out about LGBT rights in Myanmar.

In addition, she openly discusses her personal encounters with cyberbullying and offers insights on how to respond effectively to cyberbullying. Win Min Than emphasizes that women should bravely speak up if they experience sexual assault. She advocates against blaming the victim and strongly condemns the perpetrators of such assaults.

== Political activities ==
Following the 2021 Myanmar coup d'état, she participated in the anti-coup movement both in person at rallies and through social media. Denouncing the military coup, she took part in protests, starting in February. She joined the "We Want Justice" three-finger salute movement. The movement was launched on social media, and many celebrities have joined the movement.

On 6 April 2021, warrants for her arrest were issued under Section 505 (a) of the penal code by the State Administration Council for speaking out against the military coup. Along with several other celebrities, she was charged with calling for participation in the Civil Disobedience Movement (CDM) and damaging the state's ability to govern, with supporting the Committee Representing Pyidaungsu Hluttaw, and with generally inciting the people to disturb the peace and stability of the nation. She was arrested at the BH Hotel in Taunggyi hours after the military council announced that she had been charged. On 7 April 2021, she has been tried in Taunggyi Court. While she appeared in court, he held up the three-finger salute at the exit of the court.

The military council charged her with Article 505(a) and Section 17(1), sentencing her to 3 years in prison with hard labour. On March 2, 2022, the sentence under Section 505(a) was commuted, but she remained detained for the rest of that section. She was also fine Ks.10000 for Section 17 (a). She was released on 28 October 2022.
