= Gandhi Hotel Hospital =

Hospital in Tehran, Iran

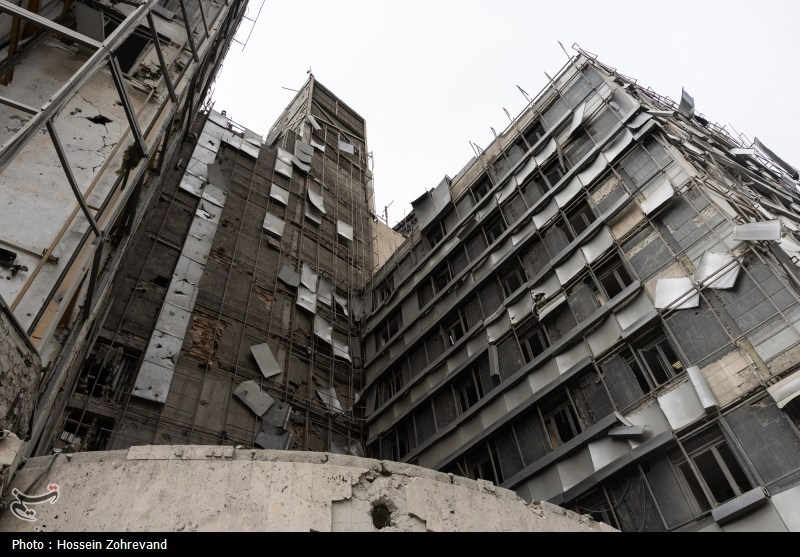
- The hospital facade after the strike

Geography
- Location: Tehran, Iran

The Gandhi Hotel Hospital is a hospital in Tehran, Iran.

In the context of the 2026 Iran war, it was hit by a U.S.-Israeli strike in March, prompting World Health Organization chief Tedros Adhanom Ghebreyesus to call the incident "extremely worrying" and "a reminder that all efforts must be taken to prevent health facilities from being caught up in the ongoing conflict." A BBC article suggests, "Verified video of the hospital showed extensive damage to the building, with debris and glass falling as civilians watched on."

Mirjana Spoljaric Egger, the president of the International Red Cross Committee, visited the hospital alongside Pirhossein Kolivand, the head of the Iranian Red Crescent Society, on April 29, 2026.

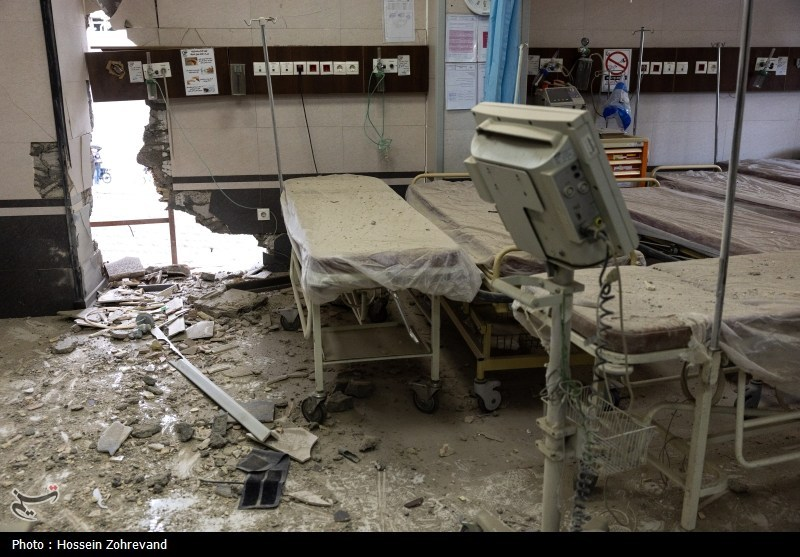
A room after the strike.
