= Sithu Aung Myint =

Burmese journalist

- စည်သူအောင်မြင့်
- Born: Burma
- Occupations: Journalist; writer

Sithu Aung Myint (Burmese: စည်သူအောင်မြင့်) is a Burmese journalist and political commentator, best known as a columnist for Frontier Myanmar, and as a contributor to VOA since 2014.

In the aftermath of the 2021 Myanmar coup d'état, he was arrested by authorities on 15 August 2021 for publishing several articles that critiqued the military junta and allegedly backing the opposing National Unity Government of Myanmar. On 7 October 2022, he was sentenced to three years in prison for incitement under section 505(a) of Myanmar's penal code. He remains at Insein Prison, where he faces a life sentence for defamation, and another 20 years for sedition. On 9 December, he was sentenced to another 7 years of hard labour.

His release was announced Dec. 1, 2025, by VOA director Michael Abramowitz. https://www.press.org/newsroom/aubuchon-honoree-sithu-aung-myint-released-myanmar-prison
