= List of newspapers in Myanmar =

This is a list of newspapers in Myanmar.

== Daily newspapers ==
State-run

- Kyemon (The Mirror) - a government-run daily newspaper (Burmese)
- Myanma Alin (The Light of Myanmar) - a government-run daily newspaper (Burmese)
- Myawady Daily - a military-run daily newspaper (Burmese)
- New Light of Myanmar - a government-run daily newspaper formerly named The Working People's Daily (Burmese and English)
- The Yadanabon - a military-run daily newspaper (Burmese)

=== Private ===
- 7 Day News (Burmese)
- China Daily Global Edition - a private daily English Newspaper (English)
- D-Wave (owned by National League for Democracy)
- Daily Eleven
- Empire Daily
- Golden Fresh Land
- The Messenger
- Myanmar Business Today
- The Myanmar Times - a private daily English newspaper (weekly in Burmese)
- The Standard Time Daily
- The Straits Times Myanmar Edition - a private daily newspaper (English)
- The Union Daily (owned by Union Solidarity and Development Party)
- The Voice Daily
- The Yangon Times

== Weekly newspapers and journals ==
- A-Myin-thit - Ministry of Interior, special branch weekly newspaper (Burmese)
- BiWeekly Eleven
- Burma Today (Burmese)
- The Commerce Journal
- Education Digest Journal (Burmese)
- First Eleven Sports Journal
- Flower News - private weekly newspaper (Burmese)
- Frontier Myanmar (English)
- Internet Journal (English and Burmese)
- Kanaung Journal of Industry and Commerce
- Kumudra (Burmese)
- Hmukhin Shudaunk (Crime Journal) (Burmese)
- Myanmar Business Today - Myanmar's first bilingual (English-Myanmar) business newspaper
- Myanmar Digest
- Myanmar Post - privately owned
- Sunday Journal
- The Myanmar Times, a Burmese weekly news journal (daily newspaper in English)
- Premier Eleven Sports Journal
- Popular News Journal
- Seven Days News or 7 Days News Journal - private weekly newspaper (Burmese)
- Seven Days Sports
- The Voice Weekly (Burmese)
- Weekly Eleven
- The Irrawaddy
- The Yangon Times
- Zay Gwet (Myanmar Market Journal)
- Pyi Myanmar News Journal
- Good Health Journal
- The Tanintharyi Weekly

== Published overseas ==
- Mizzima News Agency
- Mandalay Gazette
- Freedom News Group

== Defunct popular and influential newspapers ==
- The Botataung (Burmese)
- Daily Sport Journal
- Democracy (ceased publication in 2019)
- The Guardian (Burmese and English)
- Myanmar Freedom Daily - a private daily newspaper (English) (Last published 2015)
- The Nation (Burmese and English)
- Phoenix - entertainment weekly, banned from publishing from August 2009 for unspecified reasons
- The Worker (Burmese)

== See also ==
- Media of Myanmar
