= Freedom of the press in Myanmar =

Constitutionally provided right

Freedom of the press in Myanmar refers to the freedom of speech, expression, right to information, and mass media in particular. The media of Myanmar is regulated by the law of Myanmar, the News Media Law which prevents spreading or circulating media bias. It also determines freedom of expression for media houses, journalists, and other individuals or organisations working within the country. Its print, broadcast and Internet media is regulated under the News Media Law, nominally compiled by the International Covenant on Civil and Political Rights and international standards on freedom of expression.

The law of Myanmar compiled by the constitution, prohibits publishing fake news through online or offline mediums such as social, mass media, or otherwise newspaper and could lead to imprisonment of a journalist, newspaper ban or a fine from Ks.1,00,000/- to the maximum of Ks.3,00,000/. However, media is free to express their views, share opinions, and criticize government policies under Article 9.

== Global rank ==
Myanmar's global ranking was improved since National League for Democracy came into power. From 2013 to 2017, it reached to rank 20 in the Press Freedom Index. However, the rank declined after Reuters journalists such as Wa Lone and Kyaw Soe Oo were arrested in 2017 for their investigation into Inn Din massacre. In 2020, its declined to 139 out of 180 in the World Press Freedom Index, a report published by the Reporters Without Borders.

Another reason for press decline are; frequent arrests of journalists, internet shutdown and blocking websites associated with the press or human rights defenders.

== Censorship ==
The government of Aung San Suu Kyi has been engaged in self-censorship, particularly on three subjects such as Rohingyas, Buddhist religion and Aung San Suu Kyi, which often leads detentions (self-censorship on journalism) if violated or otherwise criticised by the press. Some media publishing houses such as Mawkun magazine, Myanmar Now, DVB, Mizzima News, and BBC Burmese have stopped publishing investigative reports. In Myanmar, private journalists are often prosecuted under article 66 (d) of the Telecommunications Act, which has been enacted to prevent online defamation. The state-owned media has been engaged in propaganda which often publish news to the general public in favour of government. In some areas such as West, has minimum access to news and other information available online since the military have disconnected the Internet in several districts on for alleged security reasons.

Journalists' detentions was criticised by Thant Myint-U, a Burmese historian citing "a tragic day for media freedom and an intimation of what’s to come."

In 2013 the government of Myanmar enacted the Telecommunications Law (section 66D), which has been a subject of arguments since it was enforced. Any person may be convinced for the maximum of three years under 66D section of Telecommunications Law. According to a non-government organisation, PEN Myanmar, 80 cases have been registered since the law enforced; however, 73 persons or media groups have been charged under 66D since Suu Kyi's government came to power in 2016. Some of the cases have been filed for making controversial comments about Suu Kyi and were subsequently prosecuted.

Burmese media was previously restricted from publishing news without approval from censorship team of Myanmar government, which was originally created during the British rule. In earlier period, Burmese government practiced direct censorship. However, in 2012 the government lifted the ban which now allows media publish news without submitting it to censorship team. Every news story, song, book, and cartoon used to required approval by team aimed at to remove "criticism".

On 11 May 2026, the Union Government of Myanmar under the Second Min Aung Hlaing cabinet officially revoked the licenses of Myaelatt Athan, Red News Agency, and Asia Citizens News Agency. These outlets cover abuses reportedly perpetrated by both the Tatmadaw and rebel forces.

== Detained journalists ==
In March 2021, Aung Thura, a BBC Burmese service reporter, was arrested by the local authorities while covering the 2021 anti-coup protests against the military. He was held for several days. The BBC claims that Forty journalists have been arrested since the civilian government was overthrown on 1 February 2021.

On 30 September 2024, 2 journalists for the independent Red News Agency, were detained by the Kachin Independence Army. Although the KIA leadership claimed that they were initially unaware of their arrests, locals speculated that the detentions were related to social media posts critical of the KIA. The journalists, Ta Lin Maung and Naung Yoe, were later released on 27 October 2024.
