= New Light of Myanmar =

Newspaper

- Type: Daily newspaper
- Format: Tabloid
- Owner: Government
- Founded: 12 January 1964
- Language: English
- Headquarters: 150 Ngarhtatgyi Pagoda St., Bahan, Yangon 11201
- Circulation: 10,000+
- Website: www.gnlm.com.mm

The New Light of Myanmar (Burmese: မြန်မာ့အလင်း, MLCTS: mran ma. a. lang:, IPA: [mjànma̰ álín]; formerly The New Light of Burma) rebranded as The Global New Light of Myanmar is a government-owned newspaper published by the Ministry of Information and based in Yangon, Myanmar.

The New Light of Myanmar has been described as being propaganda for the Tatmadaw and the government, and features many articles about military officials. The majority of domestic news articles comes from the state-run Myanmar News Agency (MNA), whilst most international articles come from news services, particularly Reuters, which are published after censorship by the MNA.

== History ==
The counterpart of the Myanmar-language Myanmar Alin (Burmese: မြန်မာ့အလင်း), the New Light of Myanmar is claimed by its editors to be the oldest English-language daily, first published on 12 January 1964 as The Working People's Daily. The newspaper took its current name on 17 April 1993.

According to Bertil Lintner of The Irrawaddy, another New Light of Myanmar had been founded in 1914, published initially as a magazine before becoming a newspaper. It was managed by U Tin from 1920 to 1947. The newspaper was shut down by the military junta in 1969.

== See also ==
- List of newspapers in Myanmar
- Mass media in Myanmar
