= Travelfish =

- Website type: Travel website
- Available in: English
- Founders: Stuart McDonald; Samantha Brown
- Website: travelfish.org
- Commercial: Yes
- Registration: Optional
- Launched: 2004; 22 years ago

Travelfish is a travel website covering Southeast Asia. It was founded in 2004 by an Australian couple, travel writer Stuart McDonald and journalist Samantha Brown, and operates out of Sydney. The website carries guidebook-style recommendations written by its staff and paid contributors, and is recognized as a major online travel resource for the region.

== History ==
McDonald first travelled to Thailand in 1993, and repeatedly visited the region in the following years, during which he worked in Australia and self-published guidebooks to Vietnam and Thailand. He met Brown in 1997, and after travelling around Southeast Asia, the couple decided to settle in Thailand in 1998 (they have since also lived in Phnom Penh and Jakarta, before settling in Bali). McDonald taught himself web development while working in Bangkok, and, as Brown had experience as a writer and editor, they came up with the idea of an online travel guide. In 2003, McDonald borrowed AU$5,000 from his parents to fund the project, and they launched the website in 2004.

The website originally featured a few locations in Thailand, but gradually expanded to cover Cambodia, Laos, Vietnam and Singapore by 2008, and later Indonesia, Malaysia and Myanmar (though it suspended its Myanmar coverage in 2018, in response to the Rohingya crisis and the sentencing of Reuters journalists Wa Lone and Kyaw Soe Oo). Initially catering to backpackers, its coverage later expanded to include a wide range of independent travel styles, and now includes over 8,000 reviews of accommodation options.

Travelfish has seen recommendations from writers for The Telegraph, The Sunday Times, The Guardian, Business Insider, and News.com.au. The New York Times travel writer Freda Moon has called it "the indispensable Southeast Asia travel guide".

== Operations ==
Travelfish Pty Ltd was registered in 2009, and is headquartered in suburban Sydney, though it maintains "research hubs" in several Southeast Asian cities. McDonald codes for and maintains the website, while Brown serves as editor-in-chief and oversees marketing. Reviews are also contributed by field researchers, who at one time comprised up to seventeen regular freelancers, though the site has since shifted toward employing several full-time staff instead. The site has policies of only doing in-person reviews and not accepting compensation from property owners.

The site has gone through several methods of generating revenue. As of 2019, it carries online advertising and affiliate links (including a partnership with hotel-booking website Agoda), offers travel-planning assistance, and has a paid membership program. The subscription, introduced in 2016, includes access to downloadable PDF guides (which were previously sold individually), exclusive content (a paywall was introduced in 2018), as well as certain discounts and services.

The site, which operates more like a traditional guidebook, has faced difficulties as readership shifted away towards those featuring user-generated content. In 2019, the site experienced a sharp drop in traffic following Google's redesigning of its search interface to heavily feature its own travel portal, a change McDonald criticized as unfair.
