= Myawady Daily =

The Myawady Daily မြဝတီ နေ့စဉ်
- Type: Daily newspaper
- Format: Berliner
- Owner: Military of Myanmar
- Founded: April 2, 2011; 15 years ago
- Language: Burmese
- Website: www.myawady.net.mm

The Myawady Daily (Burmese: မြဝတီ နေ့စဉ်) is a military-owned newspaper published by the Military Affairs Security Department's Directorate of Public Relations and Psychological Warfare of Myanmar. The newspaper was officially launched on 2 April 2011, two days after the civilian-elected members of the government were sworn in.

The Myawady Daily is part of the Burmese military's extensive media portfolio, which includes Myawaddy TV, Thazin FM, a radio station, The Yadanabon, Ngwetayi (ငွေတာရီ), a literary magazine, Thutha Alin (သုတအလင်း), a knowledge journal, Agaza Myingwin (အားကစားမြင်ကွင်း), a sports publication, and Tayza Aurora, a children's publishing house.

== See also ==
- List of newspapers in Myanmar
- Media of Myanmar
