= Kyemon =

Kyemon ကြေးမုံ
- The Logo of Kyemon Newspaper
- Type: Daily newspaper
- Format: Tabloid
- Owner: Ministry of Information (Burma) (1964-present)
- Editor: U Thaung (1957-64)
- Founded: 1957 by U Thaung
- Language: Burmese
- Headquarters: Botataung 11161, Yangon; Yangon Division, Myanmar
- Circulation: 180,000+
- Website: www.moi.gov.mm/km/

Kyemon (Burmese: ကြေးမုံ; also known as Kyaymon) (The Mirror) is a state-owned Burmese language daily newspaper based in Yangon, Myanmar. Along with Myanmar Alin, Kyemon is one of two Burmese language national newspapers in the country. Kyemon tends to carry more human interest stories whereas Myanmar Alin is more geared towards publishing government propaganda.

== History ==
Kyemon was founded in 1957 in Yangon by journalist U Thaung during Myanmar's brief experiment with parliamentary democracy and free media between 1948 and 1962. The daily was the best selling newspaper at that time, with a circulation of 90,000. After seizing power in March 1962, the military government of Gen. Ne Win cracked down on media, and nationalized all the daily newspapers, including Kyemon, in 1964. (U Thaung's open criticism of Gen. Ne Win earned him a prison sentence for him in 1964.)

The future poet laureate Soe Nyunt served as editor-in-chief of Kyemon from 1985 to 1990, going on to become Deputy Minister of Information from 1992 to 2003. Kyemon survived the military government's crackdowns on news media that left the country with only three national newspapers. As of 2007, these papers, published by the News and Publishing Enterprise of the Ministry of Information, were the Myanmar Alin and Kyemon in Burmese and the New Light of Myanmar in English.

== Content ==
The front and back pages of all Burmese newspapers almost all carry government-related news and propaganda. At any rate, most Burmese read papers not for the news but for advertisements and announcements like weddings and obituaries. In 2006, the base rate for advertising was US$15 per inch per column and US$700 for a half-page advertisement.

== See also ==
- List of newspapers in Burma
- Media of Burma
