= Sherah Beckley =

Ghanaian-British sustainability specialist

Sherah Beckley is a Ghanaian-British sustainability and corporate responsibility specialist. In 2018, she won the We Are The City Rising Star Awards in the Media and Journalism Category, after contesting with 1,250 individuals and judged by a panel of 54 independent judges.

== Early years and education ==
Beckley was born and raised in Ghana. She holds a bachelor's degree in Politics & International Relations from the University of Kent.

== Career ==
As of 2018, Sherah worked as the editor of the Thomson Reuters Sustainability site for four years serving in their global corporate responsibility & inclusion team. She also leads a network of environmental ambassadors called “Green Teams” across their global office locations as part of her work. She worked in third sector, Non Governmental Organisations and financial services.

== Awards and recognitions ==
- She was listed as one of the Top 50 Female Future Leader in Financial times
- She won the We Are The City 2018 Rising Star Award Winner in Media and Journalism
