= Swe Win =

Journalist in Myanmar

Ko Swe Win
- ဆွေဝင်း
- Born: c. 1978 (age 47–48); Rangoon, Burma (now Yangon, Myanmar)
- Occupation: Journalist
- Years active: 2009–present

Ko Swe Win (Burmese: ဆွေဝင်း; born c. 1978) is an exiled Burmese journalist. He currently serves as the editor-in-chief of Myanmar Now, a news service.

== Early life and education ==
Swe Win was born to a family in Rangoon, Burma (now Yangon, Myanmar) c. 1978. In 1998, he was arrested as a university student, for participating in a student protest in opposition to the military junta, the State Peace and Development Council. Swe Win was imprisoned for 21 years, and was released under a general amnesty in 2005. It was in prison that he began to practice mettā meditation; later on, he would add structure to his practice by participating in meditation retreats in the S. N. Goenka tradition.

== Career ==
Upon his release, he pursued academic studies in journalism, completing a master's degree in journalism at the University of Hong Kong in 2009. He joined The Irrawaddy, ultimately becoming a senior reporter there. With the onset of the 2011–2015 Myanmar political reforms, he returned to Yangon in 2012. He freelanced for Al Jazeera and New York Times, and set up a short-lived, self-financed internet news service.

In 2015, Swe Win co-founded the news service Myanmar Now, with support from the Thomson Reuters Foundation.

In September 2016, he received President's Certificate of Honour for an investigative expose on 2 teenage maids abused by their employers in a Yangon tailor shop.

Under Swe Win's leadership, Myanmar Now aggressively reported and investigated the 2017 assassination of Ko Ni, Aung San Suu Kyi's legal advisor, which made him the subject of legal backlash from authorities, and death threats from Burmese nationalists. In March 2017, he was assaulted in Sanchaung Township, Yangon, en route home. In March 2017, he was arrested and charged under Article 66(d) of the Myanmar's Telecommunications Law for a Facebook post critical of U Wirathu, a Buddhist monk known for his anti-Muslim rhetoric, specifically for defaming Wirathu. The lawsuit originated from a Patriotic Association of Myanmar supporter of Wirathu. His trial in Mandalay began on 30 July 2017, and Swe Win requested the trial be dropped as the plaintiff's witnesses had repeatedly not shown up for the trial. The case was dropped on 2 July 2019.

In a 2019 feature for the Columbia Journalism Review, Swe Win’s long-running defamation case was profiled, noting that he regularly traveled from Yangon to Mandalay for hearings under Article 66(d) of the Telecommunications Law, incurring significant personal and organizational costs.

In August 2019, Swe Win won the Ramon Magsaysay Award for Emergent Leadership, for his leadership in fostering journalistic integrity and quality in Myanmar, becoming the youngest awardee in the award's history.

On 31 December 2019, Swe Win suffered a gunshot wound while vacationing in Gwa, Myanmar, in a targeted attack. As of December 2020, the assailants remain unidentified, and the government's official investigation have not been publicly disclosed.

In 2021, he received the 2021 Shorenstein Journalism Award from Stanford University’s Walter H. Shorenstein Asia-Pacific Research Center.

Swe Win was among the first journalists to report on the massacres of the Rohingya in western Myanmar, and he contributed to international media outlets covering the killings of Rohingyas.

His personal essays published in The New York Times highlighted the persecution of the Rohingya and other minority Muslim communities in Myanmar.[22] Swe Win’s investigative reporting has also focused on decades-long human rights violations in Myanmar’s prison labour camps.[23][24]

In a 2019 investigation for Myanmar Now, Swe Win revealed how the Myanmar military continued to indoctrinate civil servants through mandatory training programs at government schools, where retired officers promoted loyalty to the Tatmadaw and nationalist ideology under the guise of professional development.

After the 2021 military coup, Swe Win continued to publish investigative reports exposing human rights abuses and disinformation by Myanmar’s junta, including an investigation into the killing of a Buddhist monk in Mandalay Region and reports on widespread military arson in central Myanmar.

== See also ==
- Myanmar Now
