= Zayar Times =

News agency in Myanmar

- Native name: ဇေယျာတိုင်း(မ်)
- Type: News agency
- Industry: Mass media
- Founded: September 2020; 6 years ago
- Headquarters: Sagaing, Myanmar
- Area served: Sagaing Region, Myanmar
- Products: News, Digital media

Zayar Times (Burmese: ဇေယျာတိုင်း(မ်)) is a local news agency based in Sagaing, Myanmar. The outlet primarily focuses on reporting regional news, investigative journalism, and local events within the Sagaing Region.

== History and suppression ==
Zayar Times was founded in September 2020, initially operating as a local news provider based in Sagaing, Myanmar, with a primary focus on regional news within the Sagaing Region. On July 1, 2021, the State Administration Council (SAC) officially revoked the media license of Zayar Times as part of a broader crackdown on independent press in the country. Prior to the closure, several members of its editorial and reporting staff were targeted with legal actions under Section 505(a) of the Penal Code.

=== Legal incidents and imprisonments ===
Following the 2021 Myanmar coup d'état, two key members of the agency were arrested and later sentenced to prison:

- Myat Nyein (also known as Myint Myat Aung): A reporter for Zayar Times, he was arrested at his home in Sagaing in June 2021.
- Pyay Phyo Aung: A member of the editorial team, he was arrested in October 2021 while serving as a Buddhist monk.

In January 2022, shortly after the agency's official closure, both Myat Nyein and Pyay Phyo Aung were sentenced to two years in prison each under Section 505(a) of the Penal Code for their reporting activities.

== See also ==
- Media of Myanmar
- Sagaing Region
