= Myanmar Post =

Weekly newspaper in Myanmar

The Myanmar Post
- Type: Weekly Newspaper
- Format: Berliner
- Owner: United Media Group Co. Ltd. (UMG)
- Founder: Win Aung
- Editor: Than Htaik Thu (Chief Editor); Zin Thaw Naing (Editor-in-charge)
- Language: Burmese
- Headquarters: No. 138, 49th Street, Pazundaung Township, Yangon, Myanmar

The Myanmar Post (Burmese: မြန်မာပို့(စ်), MLCTS: mran ma: post: [mjànmá post]) is a Burmese-language weekly newspaper based in Pazundaung Township, Yangon, Burma.

The 40-page newspaper is published in Burmese every Monday. The Myanmar Post was founded by Win Aung, a businessman, in 2008. The newspaper is privately owned by United Media Group Co. Ltd. (UMG), which is 100 percent locally owned.

The paper was one of several investigated by Myanmar's Police Intelligence Unit in 2014.

== See also ==
- List of newspapers in Burma
- Media of Burma
