= Sunday Journal (Myanmar) =

Burmese newspaper

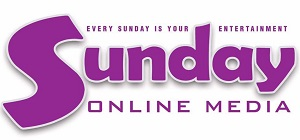
- Type: Weekly newspaper, Online news
- Format: Entertainment
- Owner: Sunday Media Group
- Editor: Ei Phyu Aung (Chief Editor)
- Founded: 12 February 2012
- Language: Burmese
- Headquarters: Pazundaung Township, Myanmar
- Website: sundayjournalmyanmar.com

Sunday Journal (Burmese: ဆန်းဒေးဂျာနယ်) is a Burmese entertainment newspaper, based in Yangon, Myanmar that was launched in February 2012 as a print media. It is one of the five most popular entertainment journals in Myanmar.

== History ==
Sunday Journal was launched on 12 February 2012 with the legal permission from the Ministry of Information, Myanmar. Sunday Journal has been published since February 2012 and has been the flagship newspaper of the weekly magazine for eight years, successfully until January 2020. However, due to the development of online media and the crisis of the print media, the publication was suspended after eight years. Although a stand-off for the printing industry, it is still successfully hosting online media.

== See also ==
- List of newspapers in Burma
- Media of Burma
