= Hein Latt =

Burmese writer

- ဟိန်းလတ်
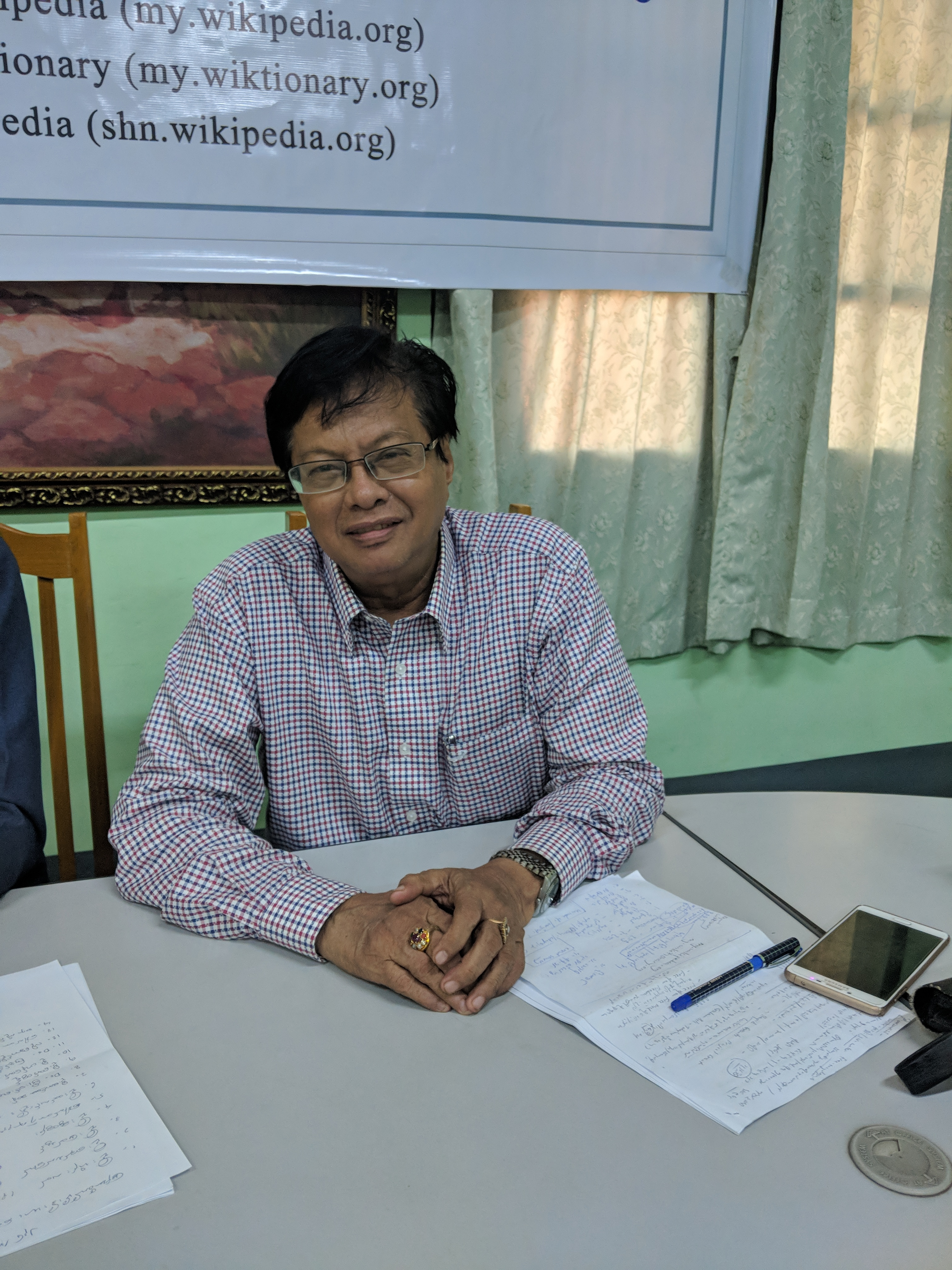
- Hein Latt at Myanmar Wikipedian meetup with writers (2018)
- Born: 21 November 1948 (age 77); Yangon, Myanmar
- Education: B.A at Yangon University
- Occupations: Writer, Journalism
- Writing career
- Notable awards: Myanmar National Literature Award 2002

Hein Latt (Burmese: ဟိန်းလတ်; born 21 November 1948) is a Burmese national writer and journalism.

At 2002, he received Myanmar National Literature Award from his book Third World to First World. He has published More than literature articles 3,000 and 93 novels.

== Biography ==
Hein Latt born on 21 November 1948 in Yangon. He graduated Library Diploma from the Yangon University . He served as an assistant librarian at the University of Agriculture and as Librarian and research officer at the Myanmar Education Association.

Since 1965, he has authored over 3,000 literature articles and 93 novels. He received Myanmar National Literature Award from his book Third World to First World.

From 1997 to 2009, he had served as editor of the Popular Journal and as the Vice President of Asean Fame Media Group in 2010.

== Books ==
- World Writers and Their Letters (1997)
- World's Love Letters (2001)
- World's Most Famous Disasters (1993)
- To be rich always to be rich (1997)
- Wealth Education (1997)
- The Gambia Astrology Project (1998)
- Political History of the Cape (1977)
- In the middle of the mound (2001)
- Literature Interview (1) (1999)
- The Search for Peace (1995)
- Mind and Gambari (2001)
- How to Cope With Mind (2001)
- Political History for Sultan Chandra (1979)
- Swami Vickyka Nanda (1984)
- The Zinskyky Political Biography (1979)
- The Goals of the Goat (1978)
- Taro Gambira (1999)
- Citizens of the People's Republic of China (1982)
- Famous Entrepreneurs (1998)
- Dissertation (2001)
- Third World to First World
- Twentieth Century Western Literature (1972)
- English Speaking Story
- Illustrated English Dictionary
- Slowly Come Aged (2000)
- Creating Value for Life (2000)
- Modern US - English -
- Capital Business English
- Secular education (1996)
- Activism (1993)
- Events (1994)
- Consciousness and Literature (1998)
- Best English English Grammar -
- White Love (Black ) (1978)
- American English
- English explanation
- English (Talk English)
- English-Speaking and Healing Litigation
- English speaking dictionary
- English-speaking idiom
- How to say in English (How to say + What to say)
- How to write in English
- Let's talk easy in English

-Different types of English sentences

- English grammar
- English grammar lessons
- English Thinking English
- Portable English Speaker
- 20th Century West Literature
- World Literature
- Maoist biography
- Biography
- Michelle Obama
- Hillary Clinton
- From the Third World to Geography
- President Ahmadinejad and Iran nuclear deal (March 2010)
- Dear Leader Kim Jong Il or North Korea (May 2010)
- CIA World Cup (CIA Final) (March 2011)
- Obama's War (August 2011)
- Salvation for Israel (September 2011)
- Israelite adventurer
- China is ruling the world
- Success eyes
- Mapless Road (personal history of South Korea's President Irrawaddy) (July 2012)
- A Day That Was Not Easy (The Venezuelan
- Assassination of Osama bin Laden) (October 2012)
