= Win Aung (minister) =

Burmese military officer and politician

His Excellency Win Aung

17th Minister of Foreign Affairs
- In office 14 November 1998 – 18 September 2004
- Preceded by: Ohn Gyaw
- Succeeded by: Nyan Win

Ambassador to the United Kingdom
- In office ? – 14 November 1998
- Leader: Than Shwe

Personal details
- Born: 28 February 1944 Tavoy (Dawei), Tennasarim, Burma
- Died: 4 November 2009 (aged 65) Insein Prison, Yangon, Myanmar
- Spouse: San Yone
- Children: Thaung Su Nyein
- Nickname: Sithu Nyein Aye (pen name)

Win Aung (Burmese: ဝင်းအောင်) was a Burmese military officer and politician who served as the 17th Minister of Foreign Affairs from 1998 until 2004.

Win Aung was born in Dawei (formerly Tavoy), Tanintharyi Division in 1944. Win Aung would later join the armed forces, where he served as a military intelligence officer.

Since June 6, 1990 Win Aung served as an ambassador to Germany and the UK until he was appointed as Minister of Foreign Affairs in November 1998. During his tenure as foreign minister, he often bore the brunt of international criticism on many issues, especially for his government's repression of political dissidents such as Aung San Suu Kyi, while visiting foreign nations. In September 2004, he was dismissed from his post, along with several other ministers, following a purge of members of the Military Intelligence faction of the State Peace and Development Council.

Win Aung was a close associate of former Prime Minister Khin Nyunt, who was among those purged in September 2004. Following his dismissal, Win Aung was arrested and sent to the notorious Insein Prison. He died there on 4 November 2009 at the age of 65. At the time of his death, he was the only former Burmese government minister to be imprisoned.

Win Aung's son, Thaung Su Nyein, is CEO of Seven Days News, a widely read journal in Myanmar.
