= Myanmore Magazine =

Magazine and web platform

Myanmore
- Founder: Andreas Sigurdsson
- Categories: Life and Style
- Frequency: monthly
- Publisher: ISSUU
- Founded: 2012; 13 years ago
- Company: Lychee Ventures
- Country: Myanmar
- Website: www.myanmore.com/yangon/

Myanmore is an English-language lifestyle and entertainment platform in Myanmar. It was founded in 2012 by Swedish national Andreas Sigurdsson. The platform caters to the expatriate and local business community of Yangon as well as visiting tourists. Its parent company is Lychee Ventures. The publications, issued weekly, monthly, and quarterly, are free and available in more than 100 venues across Yangon.

The digital site features cinema listings for theaters around Yangon. After collaborating with the Pakistani-based e-ticketing company, BookMe, Myanmore became the first company to offer cinema tickets online and through mobile phones in Myanmar. The company also uses e-ticketing to manage bus fares around Yangon.

== Publications ==
Printed publications include the Weekly Guide, InDepth Monthly Lifestyle Magazine, KnowIt Survival Guide, and EnjoyIt Dining and Nightlife Guide. Myanmore Maps is a twice-yearly publication providing directional content information of noteworthy establishments in all major cities of Myanmar. Myanmore offers a loyalty card platform for dining and various businesses around the city, the first loyalty platform in Myanmar.

== Awards ==
Myanmore hosts the annual Myanmore Dining and Nightlife Awards, which began in 2013. The awards show recognizes local establishments who contribute to the food and beverage industry through social entrepreneurship. In 2017, 45 awards were given out to selected establishments, with categories ranging from ethnic Rakhine cuisine to western comfort foods.

== See also ==
- Media of Myanmar
