= The Yangon Times =

- Type: Weekly newspaper
- Owner: Yangon Media Group
- Language: English, Burmese
- Headquarters: Burma
- Website: www.theyangontimes.com

The Yangon Times (Burmese: ရန်ကုန်တိုင်းမ်) is a weekly newspaper published in Myanmar. The website obtains much of its information from Flower News .

== See also ==
- List of newspapers in Burma
