= Than Nyut =

Burmese journalist

- Born: Myanmar
- Other names: Myanmar Alin Than Nyut မြန်မာ့အလင်းသန်းညွန့်
- Education: High school
- Occupation: Journalist

Than Nyut was a Burmese journalist who served as the supervising editor at Myanmar Alin from 1957 to 1958.

He studied until in high school during the British colonial era. After 1940, he worked as a paid apprentice for the newspaper Myanmar Alin. After the end of World War II, he became a member of the editorial team. He was appointed as the first General Secretary of the Headquarters of the Myanmar Journalists Union (ABRA (H.Q.) ), which was formed in 1953. After retiring from Myanma Alin in 1985, he wrote experience and opinion articles at journals and magazines.

== Published books ==
- သတင်းစာဆရာကြီးများ
- ကျွန်တော်ဆုံတွေ့ခဲ့ရသောသတင်းစာဆရာကြီးများ
- ပီမိုးနင်းအထိမ်းအမှတ်ခန်းမနှင့် အခြားဆောင်းပါးများ (2001)
- လွယ်အိတ်နှင့် အခြားဆောင်းပါးများ
