= Premier Eleven =

- Type: Weekly newspaper
- Language: Burmese
- Headquarters: Burma

Premier Eleven is a Burmese-language weekly newspaper published by Eleven Media Group, a major private media organization in Myanmar. Premier Eleven is part of the group’s broader network of publications, which includes English-language archives dating back to June 2012.

The newspaper covers a wide range of stories and maintains an online presence through multiple URLs. Those websites offer both Burmese and English content.

== See also ==
- List of newspapers in Myanmar
