= Myanmar News Agency =

News agency in Myanmar

The Myanmar News Agency (Burmese: မြန်မာသတင်းဌာန; abbreviated MNA) is the official state news agency of the Myanmar government, based in Yangon, Burma. It was established as News Agency Burma (NAB) in 1963, following the 1962 Burmese coup d'état. It is currently under the News and Periodical Enterprise of the Ministry of Information. MNA has the sole right to take pictures of government-arranged events, including meetings of opposition leader Aung San Suu Kyi and government officials. Local Burmese weeklies rely on the MNA for pictures that they carry with their stories.

The agency is run by the Ministry of Information and censors most national and foreign news. It falls under the News and Periodicals Enterprise, along with three major newspapers.

The agency uses feeds from Reuters and the Press Trust of India.

The MNA has news exchange agreements with international news agencies, including Xinhua, ITAR-TASS, Yonhap, Kyodo, Tanjug, ANTARA, KPL and VNA.

== See also ==
- Censorship in Burma
- Media of Burma
