= Myanmar Digest =

Newspaper

- Type: Weekly newspaper
- Language: Burmese
- Headquarters: Burma

Myanmar Digest is a weekly newspaper published in Burma.

== See also ==
- List of newspapers in Burma
