= Burma Today =

- Type: Weekly newspaper
- Language: Burmese
- Headquarters: Burma

Burma Today is a Burmese-language weekly newspaper published in Myanmar.

== See also ==
- List of newspapers in Burma
