= Kumudra =

Weekly newspaper in Burma

- Type: Weekly newspaper
- Format: Print, online
- Owner: Kumudra News
- Founded: 2000
- Language: Burmese
- Headquarters: Burma
- Website: www.kumudranews.com

Kumudra (Burmese: ကုမုဒြာဂျာနယ်) is a Burmese-language weekly newspaper published in print and online in Myanmar.

== See also ==
- List of newspapers in Burma
