= Antonio Zappulla =

Italian journalist

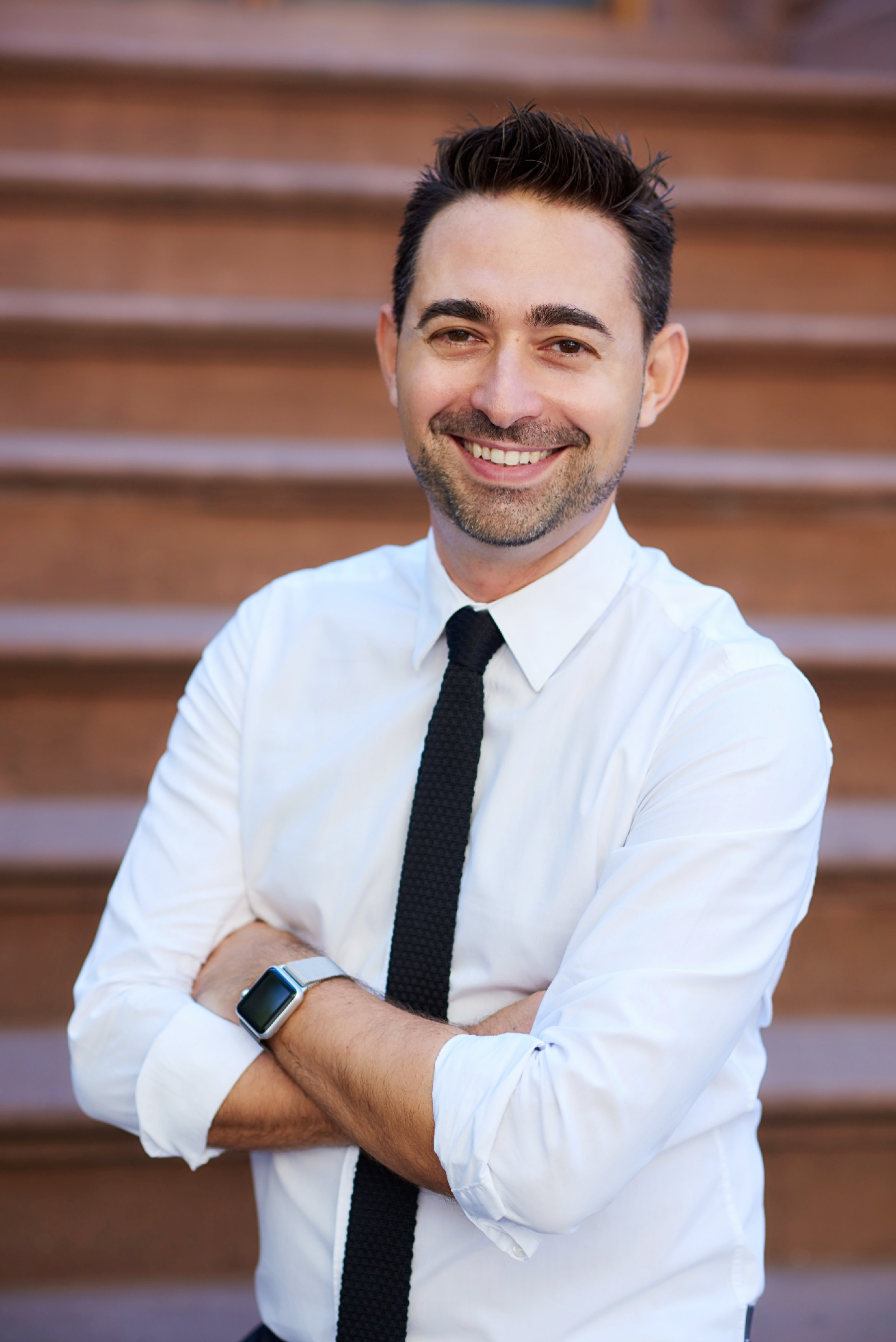
- Occupation: CEO of the Thomson Reuters Foundation
- Known for: Journalism and LGBT civil rights

Antonio Zappulla is the CEO of the Thomson Reuters Foundation, the corporate foundation of Thomson Reuters. The foundation is an independent charity registered in the UK and the US.

== Education ==
Zappulla has a Master's degree in Islam and Middle East studies, as well as a Bachelor's degree in Journalism.

== Career ==
Zappulla previously worked at Bloomberg Television, where he was in charge of news, factual programming and documentaries for Europe, Middle East and Africa, developing a number of award-winning TV series distributed globally. He then moved to the Thomson Reuters Foundation, where, in April 2019, he became CEO after working at the foundation for six years.

== Thought leadership ==
Zappulla has said that hostile, prejudiced media coverage fuels stigma and violence against LGBTQ+ people, and that what's needed is not advocacy journalism but reporting that sticks to the facts. In response, he founded Openly in 2018, the Foundation’s social media brand for fair, accurate and impartial journalism on LGBTQ+ issues. Primarily hosted on TikTok, it aims to raise awareness, inform and empower its highly engaged audience.

He has regularly used his platform to spotlight rising legal threats to both independent media and NGOs, including, most recently, the global proliferation of foreign agent laws.

Following the explosion in corporate adoption of generative AI-powered tools led by the launch of ChatGPT in 2022, Zappulla has highlighted the need for greater transparency in how businesses are using AI to ensure no harm to people, society and the environment.

== Recognition ==
In 2018, Zappulla was ranked first in the OUTstanding list of third sector LGBT executives published by the Financial Times. In 2017, he was named a European Young Leader by Friends of Europe, and in 2016, he was awarded the Talented Young Italians Award by the Italian Chamber of Commerce.

In 2022, Antonio was knighted as an Officer of the Italian Republic for "merit acquired in the fields of public service, and social, philanthropic and humanitarian activities” under the OMRI order, the highest-ranking honour of the Italian Republic.
