= Zay Gwet =

- Type: Weekly newspaper
- Language: Burmese
- Headquarters: Burma

Zay Gwet (Burmese: ဈေးကွက်;) is a weekly newspaper published in Burma. It specializes in economics, market study and related subjects.

== See also ==
- List of newspapers in Burma
