= Seven Days Sports =

- Type: Weekly newspaper
- Language: Burmese
- Headquarters: Burma

Seven Days Sports is a weekly newspaper published in Burma.

== See also ==
- List of newspapers in Burma
