= Thaung Su Nyein =

Burmese businessman (born 1977)

- Born: 1977 (age 48–49); Burma
- Occupation: Businessman
- Known for: Founder of 7Day News
- Spouse: Su Su Soe Nyunt
- Parent: Win Aung (father)
- Website: www.thaungsunyein.com

Thaung Su Nyein (Burmese: သောင်းစုငြိမ်း; born 1977) is a Burmese businessman. He founded a media company called Information Matrix which publishes 7Day Daily, one of Myanmar's highest-circulated news journals, and served as 7Day's editor-in-chief. He is the son of Win Aung, a former Burmese foreign minister. He studied computer science at City College of New York but exited after his 3rd year to return to Myanmar.

He is married to Su Su Soe Nyunt and has two sons.
