= Insein Prison =

Prison near Yangon, Myanmar

Coordinates: 16.892715°N 96.097986°E

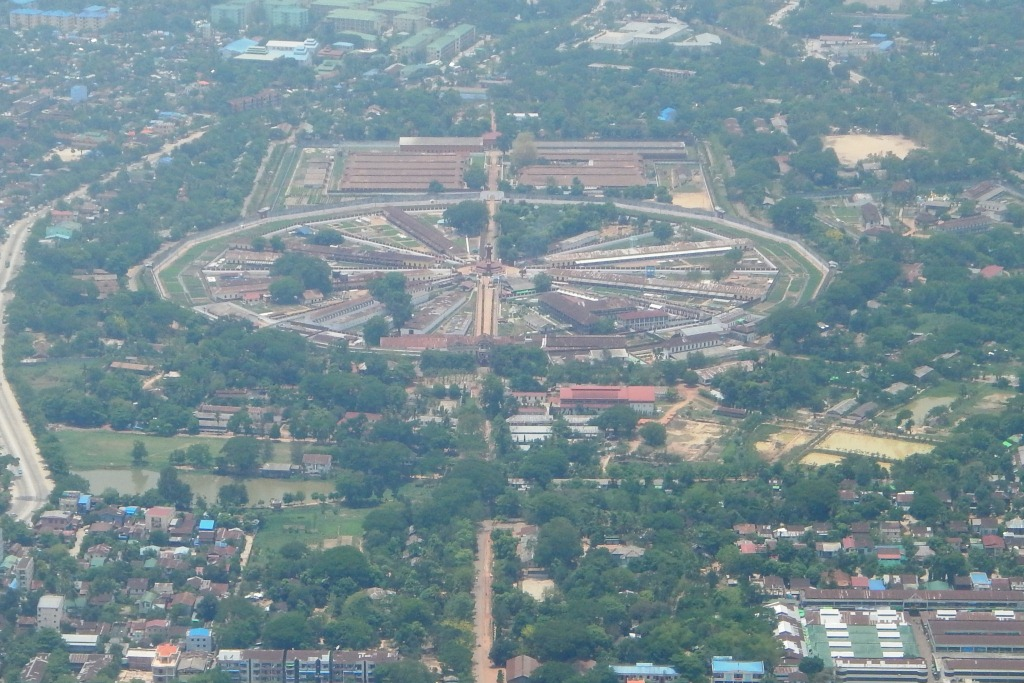
- Interactive map of Insein Prison
- Location: Yangon, Myanmar
- Status: Active
- Capacity: 5,000
- Population: 15000+ (2022)
- Opened: 1887; 139 years ago
- Managed by: Ministry of Home Affairs

Insein Prison (Burmese: အင်းစိန်ထောင်) is located in Yangon Division, near Yangon (Rangoon), the old capital of Myanmar (formerly Burma). From 1988 to 2011 it was run by the military junta of Myanmar, named the State Law and Order Restoration Council from 1988 to 2003 and the State Peace and Development Council (SPDC) from 2003 to 2011, and was used largely to repress political dissidents.

The prison is notorious worldwide for its inhumane conditions, corruption, abuse of inmates, and use of mental and physical torture.

== History ==
Colonial British authorities built Insein Prison in 1887 to relieve overcrowding at Rangoon Central Gaol, located on Commissioner's Road (now Bogyoke Aung San Road) near Downtown Yangon. The prison was built using a circular panopticon design, intended to optimise surveillance of inmates. Following the demolition of Rangoon Central Gaol after World War II, Insein Prison became Yangon's primary correctional facility.

== Conditions ==
=== Sanitation and healthcare ===
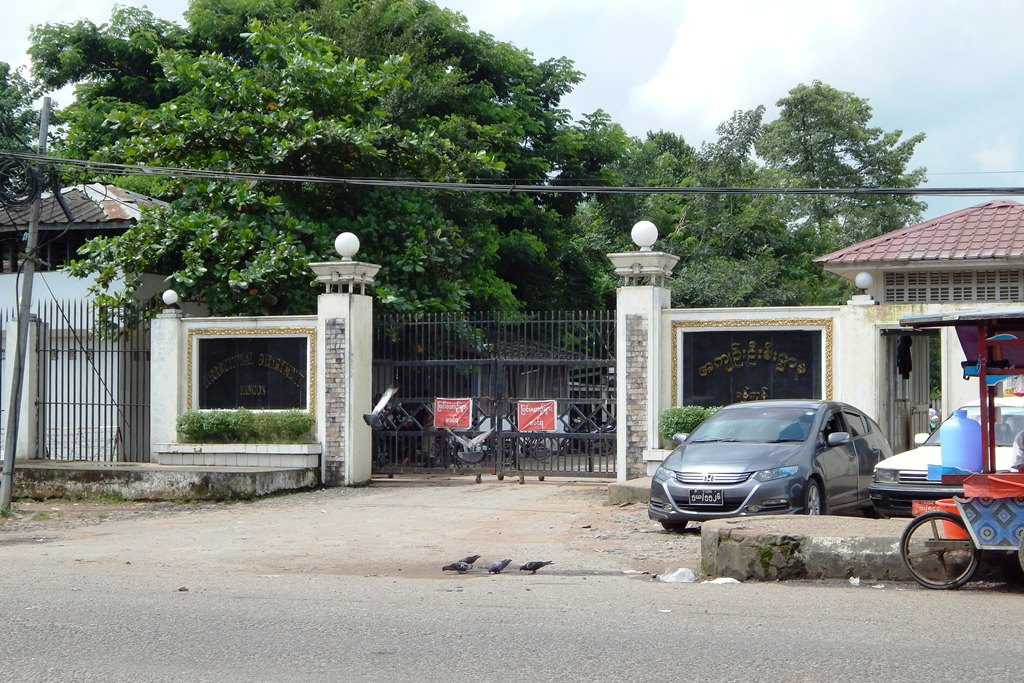
Insein Prison main gate

At Insein, diseases and injuries usually go untreated. A former prisoner at Insein recalls that "When we had fever they never gave us any medicine. If it gets very bad then they send you to the prison hospital, where many people die. The sick prisoners want to go to the hospital, but the guards never send them there until it's already too late, so many die once they get to the hospital. I got fever but I didn't want to go to their hospital, because I was afraid of their dirty needles and contagious diseases. At the hospital they have doctors, but not enough medicines." The same prisoner continued, "They allowed us to have a bath once a day. We had to line up in rows of five men at a time, and we were allowed five bowls of water, then soap, then seven more bowls of water. But there were many problems – sometimes there was no water supply, so they wouldn't let us take a bath and we could hardly even get water to drink. There were latrines in two places – outside of the room for the daytime, and in the room at night. The latrines always had guards, and to use them you had to bribe the guard with two cheroots. The latrine was just a bucket, with no water. You could use paper if you could get some, but we used to beg scraps of cloth from the men who worked in the sewing workshop out in the compound."

=== Tortures ===
Prisoners have reportedly been beaten with a rubber pipe filled with sand and chased by dogs, forcing them to crawl on their hands and knees across a gravel path.

== Protests within the prison ==
=== 1991 prisoner hunger strike ===
According to a former prisoner's account, in 1991 several prisoners held a hunger strike, demanding proper healthcare and the right to read newspapers. However, their demands were not met, and the prisoners were tortured using the gravel path method.

=== 2008 mass shooting of inmates ===
On 3 May 2008, over 100 prisoners were shot by guards at the prison resulting in the deaths of 36 inmates. A further four inmates were later tortured and killed by the prison guards who believed they had been the ringleaders of the initial protest that culminated in the mass shooting.

=== 2011 prisoner hunger strike ===
On 24 May 2011, the Myanmar government retaliated against a hunger strike by about 30 political prisoners in the prison by forcing the ringleaders into solitary confinement. The hunger strike began when seven female prisoners protested against a government prisoner amnesty program that failed to include most political detainees. On 23 May, 22 male prisoners, including three Buddhist monks, joined the protest, demanding better prison living conditions and improved family visiting rights. According to Aung Din, the executive director of the Washington-based U.S. Campaign for Burma, "The latest information we have received is that six of the ‘leaders’ of the strike from the male group have been moved to what is known as the 'dog cell'—a small cell block where they could be tortured and family visits are not allowed." One of the prisoners moved was an editor of The Kantaryawaddy Times, Nyi Nyi Htun.

=== 2022 prison explosion ===
In October 2022, a blast occurred at the prison in which eight persons died, including guards, and 18 visitors were injured. The incident occurred at 9:40 AM Myanmar Standard Time. According to local witnesses, two parcel bombs detonated in the morning. but the cause of explosion is yet unknown

== Notable prisoners ==
Most famous illegally held prisoners in Insein prison from 1988 to 2017:

- Student leaders of the 1988 Uprising, including among others: Min Ko Naing, Pyone Cho, Ko Ko Gyi, Kyaw Min Yu, and Mya Aye.
- Intellectual and democracy activist Win Tin, and a host of others who were elected to parliament as members of the National League for Democracy (NLD) in 1990 but not allowed to serve their term in parliament.
- Aung San Suu Kyi the Nobel Peace Prize-winner human-rights activist was confined to Insein in 2003, 2007 and 2009).
- Video-journalist Sithu Zeya who was arrested in April 2010 for photographing the aftermath of an attack on civilians by the military junta as a reporter for the Democratic Voice of Burma.
- Video-journalist Ngwe Soe Lin who was arrested in an internet cafe in Rangoon on April 14, 2010, for his video coverage of Burmese children orphaned by Cyclone Nargis in 2008. Democracy activist Aye Yung was held for trial at Insein Prison for distribution of leaflets at Dagon University.
- Reuters journalists Wa Lone and Kyaw Soe Oo were held for more than 500 days following their arrest on 12 December 2017, due to their investigation of the Inn Din massacre. Amid international outcry over their imprisonment, both were released on 7 May 2019, following a pardon from President of Myanmar Win Myint. While imprisoned in Insein Prison, Wa Lone wrote a children's book, Jay Jay the Journalist.
