= Hmukhin =

Mhukhin
- Type: Weekly newspaper
- Language: Burmese
- Headquarters: Burma

Mhukhin (Burmese: မှုခင်း) is a weekly newspaper published in Burma.

== See also ==
- List of newspapers in Burma
