= Popular Journal =

Popular Journal Myanmar
- Type: Weekly entertainment Journal, Online news
- Owner: Asian Fame Media Group
- Founded: June 30, 1997; 29 years ago
- Language: Burmese
- Headquarters: 35th ST, Kyauktada Township, Yangon, Myanmar
- Website: www.popularmyanmar.com

Popular Journal (Burmese: ပေါ်ပြူလာဂျာနယ်) is a Burmese weekly newspaper, published by Asian Fame Media Group. It is a weekly journal that sheds light on the entertainment culture of Myanmar and is one of the longest-standing media outlets in Myanmar.

== History ==
Popular Journal was founded on June 30, 1997, by Nan Kalyar Win, daughter of General Win Myint, who was a close confidant of former military dictator Than Shwe. Due to the owner's military background, Nan Kalyar had the opportunity to interview Senior General Min Aung Hlaing before the 2020 general election. During the interview, Min Aung Hlaing recounted his family background, military career, and rise to his rank. He also expressed doubts about the integrity of the poll and alleged shortcomings in the election preparations.

In July 2010, the government suspended Popular Journal for a week after it repeatedly published racy pictures of models on its front page, which were deemed against Myanmar's culture.

In 2012, along with several local media outlets, Popular Journal played a crucial role in the anti-Rohingya campaign in Myanmar.

In June 2014, the Special Branch (SP) of the Ministry of Home Affairs investigated the financial records of six private local news journals, including Popular News, reportedly to understand how these journals managed to stay afloat during a difficult market crisis for print media in Myanmar.

In the aftermath of the 2021 Myanmar coup d'état, the journal began to focus on junta-related news, reporting only the victories of the Myanmar military while ignoring the resistance movements occurring in various parts of the country. The journal is one of the few pro-military media outlets allowed to attend the military's press conferences.

== See also ==
- List of newspapers in Burma
- Media of Burma
