= 7Day News =

Newspaper published in Myanmar

- Type: Weekly newspaper
- Founded: 25 April 2013
- Ceased publication: March 2021
- Language: Burmese
- Headquarters: Burma
- Website: 7daydaily.com

7Day News (Burmese: ၇ ရက် နေ့စဉ်သတင်းစာ) was a private weekly newspaper published in Myanmar, and among the best-selling journals in the country. Its CEO, Thaung Su Nyein, is the son of Win Aung, a former minister for foreign affairs.

== History ==
7Day News began circulation on 25 April 2013.

It was suspended for one week for publishing front-page news on Aung San Suu Kyi in November 2010. Other publications also suspended were The Voice Weekly, Venus News, Pyithu Khit, Myanmar Post, The Snap Shot and Myanmar Newsweek.

After the 2021 Myanmar coup d'état, the military junta revoked the operating licenses of 7Day News, and four other media outlets, namely Myanmar Now, Democratic Voice of Burma (DVB), Khit Thit Media, and Mizzima News, amidst the ongoing protests against the military coup.

== See also ==
- List of newspapers in Burma
