= The Yadanabon =

Military-owned newspaper in Mandalay, Upper Myanmar

The Yadanarbon ရတနာပုံ
- Type: Daily newspaper
- Format: Tabloid
- Owner: Tatmadaw
- Language: Burmese
- Headquarters: Pyigyidagun Township, Mandalay; Mandalay Region, Myanmar
- Website: yadanarbonnews.com

The Yadanabon (Burmese: ရတနာပုံ သတင်းစာ) is a military-owned daily newspaper published by the central region command based in Mandalay. The newspaper carries mainly Mandalay- and Upper Myanmar-related news.

== See also ==
- List of newspapers in Burma
- Media of Burma
