= U Thaung =

- ဦးသောင်း
- Born: Aung Bala; 4 October 1926; Nyaung Oo, British Burma
- Died: 3 April 2008 (aged 81); Fort Lauderdale, Florida, United States
- Occupation: Journalist
- Known for: Founder of Kyemon newspaper
- Spouse: Tin Tin Win
- Children: Five
- Parent(s): Tha Phan; Ok
- Awards: World Press Freedom Heroes

U Thaung (born "Aung Bala"; 4 October 1926 – 3 April 2008) was a Burmese author and journalist. In 1957, he founded the newspaper Kyemon, which quickly became the most popular in Burma. In 2000, he was named one of the International Press Institute's 50 World Press Freedom Heroes of the past half-century.

== Work with Kyemon ==
U Thaung was born "Aung Bala" in Nyaung Oo township, Mandalay Division, to Thar Phan and Daw Oak. He began his literary career with humor writing and plays, entering journalism in 1947 with the Yangon-based newspaper The Burma Times. Within four years, at the age of 25, he had become the newspaper's editor-in-chief.

In 1957, he founded his own independent daily, which he titled Kyemon (English: "The Mirror"). The paper was an immediate success, and its circulation rose to 55,000 over the next seven years, more than twice the circulation of its next closest competitor.

The following year, following a split in Prime Minister U Nu's Anti-Fascist People's Freedom League, General Ne Win was given control of a two-year caretaker government. The military government immediately began to restrict press freedoms, imprisoning journalists and dissidents. Kyemon was briefly confiscated by the authorities, but returned to U Thaung's control after U Nu's 1960 return to power.

Ne Win took control again, however, in a 1962 coup d'état. For the next two years, Kyemon continued to publish "open criticism" of the military rule of Ne Win's new party, the Burma Socialist Programme Party. In 1964, U Thaung, along with three other editors, was arrested for his writing and imprisoned without charge. Kyemon was nationalized on 1 September 1964, followed by several other papers, marking the end of a free Burmese press for more than fifty years.

== Post-release ==
U Thaung was pardoned in 1967. He then began work at the Ministry of Information and was again permitted to write columns; however, his license was revoked when his popular column again became too critical of the government. In 1977, he was granted permission to travel to the US, where he began work for The Missourian, based in Washington, Missouri. While in the US, he continued to criticize Burmese military rule, most notably in a Reader's Digest article describing his three years of imprisonment. In retaliation, the Ne Win government revoked his passport, leaving him unable to travel or return home. The American government later granted him political asylum.

U Thaung continued to condemn military rule in Burma through essays and books for the next three decades. He wrote thirty books in his lifetime, two of which-- General Ne Win and His Executioners (1990) and A Journalist, a General and an Army in Burma (1995)--became bestsellers. He also became a consultant for Radio Free Asia and served as editor in chief of the New Era Journal, an independent Burmese news publication printed in Thailand and illegally smuggled into Burma.

On 3 April 2008, U Thaung died in Fort Lauderdale, Florida, having never returned to Burma. He had worked in journalism for over sixty years, leading Democratic Voice of Burma to dub him "Burma's longest-serving journalist".

== Personal life ==
U Thaung was married to Tin Tin Win, with whom he had five children, now living in the US.
