= The Voice Daily =

The Voice Daily is a newspaper published in Burma. Due to censorship-related law changes, the paper began freely publishing from 1 April 2013. The Voice Daily is run by the publishers of The Voice Weekly, which has been published since 2004.
