= Kanaung Journal =

- Type: Weekly newspaper
- Editor: Khin Zaw Moe
- Language: Burmese
- Headquarters: Kyauktada Township, Yangon, Myanmar

Kanaung Journal (Burmese: ကနောင်ဂျာနယ်) is a Burmese-language weekly newspaper published in Myanmar (Burma).

== See also ==
- List of newspapers in Burma
