= Shwe Kyu =

Burmese writer and publisher

Shwe Kyu ရွှေကြူး
- Born: 1883; Mawlamyine, Mon State, Myanmar
- Died: 1935
- Years active: 1914
- Known for: founder of Myanmar Alin
- Parents: Khin (father); Gone (mother)

Shwe Kyu (1883–1935) was the founder of Myanmar's first modern Myanmar Alin magazine, which is still distributed today as the Myanmar Alin Newspaper. He was also the inventor of a new Peacock branding Burmese textbook.

== Early life and education ==
Shwe Kyu was born on 1883 in Mawlamyine, Mon State, Myanmar. He has eight siblings. He was a modern scholar and attended at Yangon College.

== Careers ==
Before World War I, He worked at German businesses in Rangoon. Then, in 1271, he opened his own company in Rangoon called Shwe Kyu.

In addition, He set up a printing press called Shwe Kyu Printing House and started publishing Myanma Alin Magazine in June 1912, during the British colonial era in Yangon.The paper was known for its anti-colonialist stance before World War II. In August 1914, Shwe kyu, who took advantage of the outbreak of World War I, published a separate Myanma Alin War Telegraph newsletter in addition to Myanma Alin Magazine in November of that year. It was renamed the Myanmar Alin Newspaper on March 15, 1915.

He was deported to Singapore in 1916. These events took place during World War I. Even after World War I, he was not allowed to return to his homeland. He was allowed to return to his country in 1921.Upon his return to Burma, he tried to publish a newspaper called "Liberty" (Independence). However, it was shut down due to inconsistencies during a short time. Eventually, Shwe Kyu became the secretary of the Rangoon Municipality.

Shwe Kyu not only started publishing "Myanmar Alin Magazine" but he also wrote and published "Shwe Kyu English-Burmese Dictionary".

== Exile ==
A year after the publication of the Myanmar Alin, the Burmese government demanded 5,000 kyats bail for an advertisement, Beware of March 15th. The advertiser was the author, P Moe Nin, and the advertiser himself explained that he was announcing the publication of his book, but to no avail. So, after the newspaper was shut down without bail, Shwe Kyu went to Japan to study lithography in 1916.

On the way, he visited to Myingun Prince in Saigon and discussed the return of Burma to the hands of Burmese dynasties. Thinking that Burma would be returned hands of Burmese dynasties, he took a Power of Attorney from the Myingun Prince and spoke with Lockham Ninghan, the British ambassador to Japan. However, the Burmese government took a different interpretation of Shwe Kyu's case and ordered his return from Japan. On his return from Japan, he was deported by the burmese government to prevent him from returning to Burma.
