= Khit Thit Media =

News agency in Myanmar

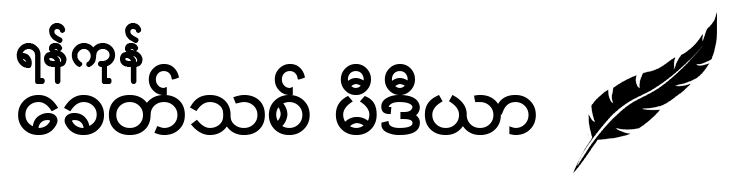
- Native name: ရန်ကုန်ခေတ်သစ်မီဒီယာ
- Industry: News agency
- Founded: 1 January 2018; 8 years ago
- Headquarters: Yangon, Myanmar
- Area served: Myanmar
- Key people: Thalun Zaung Htet, Editor-in-Chief
- Website: yktnews.com

Khit Thit Media (Burmese: ရန်ကုန်ခေတ်သစ်မီဒီယာ; lit. 'Yangon New Age Media') is a news agency based in Myanmar (Burma). It is among the few independent news outlets in Myanmar.

== History ==
Khit Thit Media was established on 1 January 2018 by Tharlun Zaung Htet, its editor-in-chief. Khit Thit Media has been subjected to repeated infringements on freedom of press. In February 2020, nationalists protested in front of Yangon City Hall, calling on Khit Thit Media to remove reporting on nationalist group activities. In March 2020, a police raid targeted its editor-in-chief and several journalists, for re-posting an interview with a spokesman of Arakan Army, an insurgent ethnic armed organisation in Rakhine State.

In March 2021, following the 2021 Myanmar coup d'état, the military regime stripped Khit Thit, along with four other independent news agencies (Myanmar Now, Democratic Voice of Burma, Mizzima News, and 7Day News), of its media license for its ongoing coverage of the anti-coup protests.

== See also ==
- Myanmar Now
- Myanmar Times
- Frontier Myanmar
- The Irrawaddy
