= Ledi Pandita U Maung Gyi =

Famous Burmese writer

Ledi Pandita U Maung Gyi လယ်တီ ပဏ္ဍိတ ဦးမောင်ကြီး
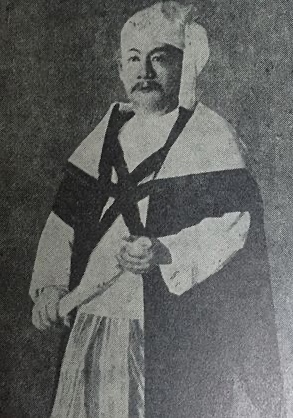
- Born: Maung Thant Sin; December 12, 1878; Nyaung Phyu Pin, Monywa Township, Sagaing Region, Burma(Myanmar)
- Died: April 21, 1939 (aged 60); Monywa Township, Sagaing Region, Burma (Myanmar)
- Occupations: Writer, journalist, politician
- Children: 5
- Awards: Honorary Master's Degree; Agga Maha Pandita title (Rejected)

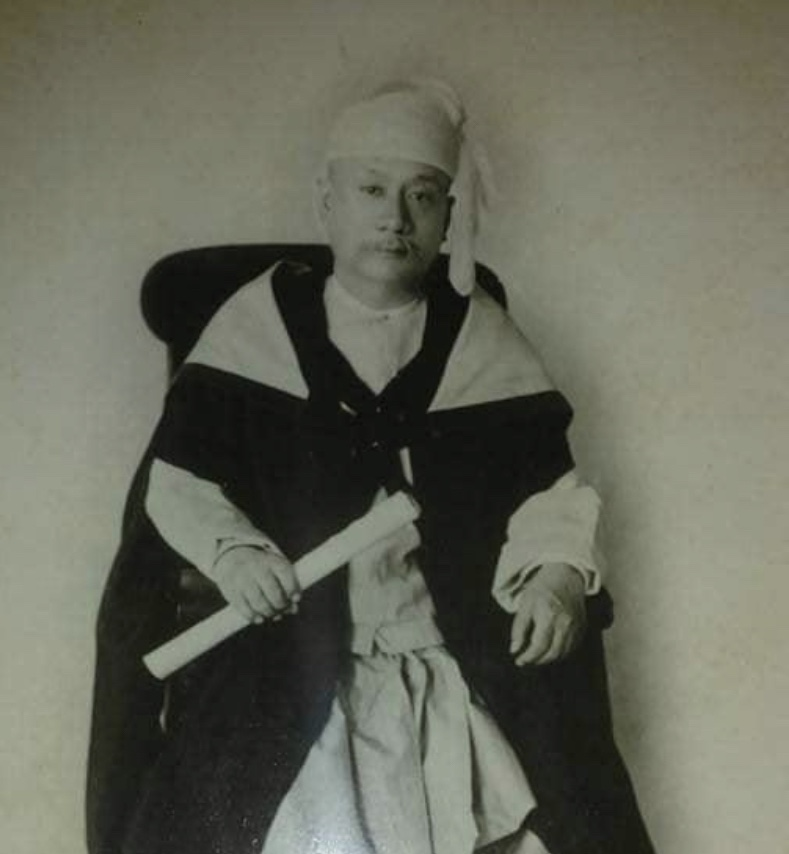
Photo of Ledi Pandita U Maung Gyi

Ledi Pandita U Maung Gyi (21 April 1939—12 December 1878) was a Burmese writer, translator, and greatest disciple of Ledi Sayadaw. He was the first publisher of the Myanmar Alin magazine.

== Early life and education ==
Ledi Pandita U Maung Gyi is a native of Nyaung Phyu Pin Village, Monywa Township, about seven miles south of Monywa in Upper Burma (Myanmar). He was born on 12 December 1878.
