= First Eleven (newspaper) =

- Type: Weekly newspaper
- Language: Burmese
- Headquarters: Burma

First Eleven was a weekly sports newspaper published in Burma. It was published by Zaw Thet Htwe, a former student leader, until he was jailed and sentenced to death by the government in 2003 on charges of treason; following international outcry, he was released in 2004. Four other editors, including Win Pa Pa Hlaing, the daughter of Ohn Kyaing, were also arrested.

== See also ==
- List of newspapers in Burma
