= The Commerce Journal =

Online Burmese language newspaper

- Type: Weekly newspaper
- Format: Print, online
- Owner: State owned
- Founded: 2012
- Political alignment: Pro-government
- Language: Burmese
- Headquarters: Burma
- Website: https://www.commercejournal.com.mm/

The Commerce Journal is a Myanmar state-owned weekly online Burmese language newspaper. It is published every Monday by the Ministry of Commerce in Burma.

== See also ==
- List of newspapers in Burma
