= Weekly Eleven =

- Type: Weekly newspaper
- Language: Burmese
- Headquarters: Yangon
- Country: Myanmar
- Website: www.news-eleven.com

Weekly Eleven is a weekly newspaper published in Myanmar (Burma). It is one of the five weekly journals published by Eleven Media Group which was founded in June 2000. It is focused on general local news and some sports and international news. It won the "Media of the Year" award in 2011 from Reporters Without Borders, for standing up to the junta and "using extraordinary ingenuity to slip through the censorship net and inform the public".

On 4 May 2012, Nation Multimedia Group chairman Suthichai Yoon and Eleven Media Group chairman and CEO Dr Than Htut Aung signed a memorandum of understanding in Yangon to form a joint venture in a wide range of English-language publications.

On 28 May 2026, an article in Indian factchecking website Alt News, when discussing a disinformation article published in Weekly Eleven, said that "Eleven Media Group identifies as independent, but has published content favorable toward the military since the [February 2021] coup." Another publication from Eleven Media group, The Daily Eleven, had been widely boycotted for what was seen as reporting friendly to the coup and the resulting military government.

== See also ==
- List of newspapers in Myanmar
