= Press Scrutiny and Registration Division =

Government agency of Myanmar

The Press Scrutiny and Registration Division (Burmese: စာပေစိစစ်နှင့်မှတ်ပုံတင်ဌာန, formerly the Press Scrutiny Board or PSB) is a division under the Ministry of Information, responsible for censorship of media in Myanmar. Its current director is Major Tint Swe. PSRD censors all forms of media, ranging from publications such as newspapers and magazines and other published content like books. New publishers are required to register publications with the PSRD. The PSRD's time-consuming and arbitrary process has forced nearly all privately held news publications in Burma to publish on a weekly or monthly basis. All of the daily newspapers in Burma are government-owned.

Its origins date to August 1962, with the promulgation of the Printers' and Publishers' Registration Act, which established the Press Scrutiny Board, by the Revolutionary Council. In April 2005, the Press Scrutiny Board was renamed the Press Scrutiny and Registration Division.

In 2009, a medical malpractice incident that resulted in the death of a young girl, which was widely reported in local Burmese media prompted a crackdown in censorship by the PSRD. Publications that report unapproved material, or "subversive" material can face publication bans. "Sandwich reporting," in which messages are included in stories or written works, that aren't caught by the censorship board, have become part of the working vocabulary of Burmese journalists.

The 20 July 2010 directive issued by the Press Scrutiny and Registration Board, called for "correct and complete quoting of the [2008] constitution, electoral laws and its rules". It also warns domestic journals that stern action could include loss of publishing licenses for breach of the directive.

== See also ==
- Censorship in Myanmar
