= Mratt Kyaw Thu =

Burmese journalist

Mratt Kyaw Thu in 2023

Mratt Kyaw Thu (Burmese: မြတ်ကျော်သူ; born c. 1990) is a Burmese journalist, focusing on political reporting. He has worked for EFE since 2018.

== Career ==
He began his career at Unity Weekly Journal in 2010. He previously worked as a senior reporter at the Frontier Myanmar, The Myanmar Times and Mizzima. He won the 2017 Agence France-Presse Kate Webb Prize for his coverage of ethnic and religious conflict in Myanmar's borderlands, despite risk of prosecution or injury.

=== 2021 Myanmar coup d'état ===
Mratt Kyaw Thu's name came further to attention of the military junta following a March interview he conducted with a general who had defected and joined the Civil Disobedience Movement (CDM). On 5 April 2021, he was charged and issued an arrest warrant under section 505 (A) of the penal code by the State Administration Council for speaking out against the military coup. Along with several other celebrities, he was charged with calling for participation in the Civil Disobedience Movement (CDM) and damaging the state's ability to govern, with supporting the Committee Representing Pyidaungsu Hluttaw, and with generally inciting the people to disturb the peace and stability of the nation.

Mratt Kyaw Thu escaped Yangon to villages in ethnic armed areas near the border and fled to Thailand. He was able to fly to Germany via Bangkok. He has spent four weeks in a detention centre at Frankfurt Airport. Germany refused to grant him asylum and he left for Spain.
