= Golden Fresh Land =

Newspaper

- Type: Daily
- Launched: 1 April 2013
- Language: Burmese
- Headquarters: Yangon, Myanmar

Golden Fresh Land (Burmese: ရွှေနိုင်ငံသစ်နေ့စဉ်သတင်းစာ) is a newspaper published in Burma. Due to censorship-related law changes in Myanmar, the paper began freely publishing from 1 April 2013. Golden Fresh Land is run by Khin Maung Lay, who worked for the Mogyo Daily prior to 1964 and has served multiple prison terms for speaking out against the government.
