= Myanmar Alin =

Newspaper

Myanmar Alin မြန်မာ့အလင်း
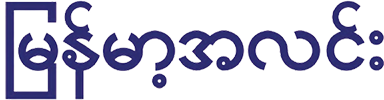
- Logo
- Type: Daily newspaper
- Format: Tabloid
- Publisher: Ministry of Information
- Founded: 1914
- Language: Burmese
- Headquarters: Yangon
- Circulation: 220,000
- Website: www.moi.gov.mm/mal/

Myanmar Alin (Burmese: မြန်မာ့အလင်း; also known as Myanma Alinn) is a state-run Burmese language daily newspaper and the longest running newspaper in circulation in Myanmar. The paper is considered to be the official mouthpiece of the government of Myanmar.

== History ==
Myanmar Alin was founded as a magazine by U Shwe Kyu (Burmese: ဦးရွှေကြူး) and published by Ledi Pandita U Maung Gyi in 1914 during the British colonial era in Yangon. The paper was known for its anti-colonialist stance before World War II. The paper was nationalised in 1969 by General Ne Win's military government.

== Content ==
The front and back pages of all Burmese newspapers are dedicated almost entirely to government-related news. Most domestic news comes from the official government news bureau, Myanmar News Agency (MNA). Papers are read not for the news but for advertisements and announcements like weddings and obituaries.

== Broadcasting ==
Myanmar Radio and Television broadcasts free-to-air terrestrial television stations such as MRTV, MRTV News, MITV, MRTV NRC, MRTV Parliament, MRTV Farmer, and MRTV Sport.

== See also ==
- List of newspapers in Burma
- Media of Burma
