= The Standard Time Daily =

- Type: Newspaper
- Format: Print, online
- Publisher: U Ko Ko Lay
- Editor-in-chief: Maung Lunn Kyi
- Editor: Lwin Min Oo
- Launched: 1 April 2013
- Language: Burmese
- Headquarters: Pazundaung Township, Yangon, Myanmar
- City: Yangon, Mandalay, Nay Pyi Taw
- Country: Myanmar
- Website: www.sdtimedaily.com

The Standard Time Daily (Burmese: စံတော်ချိန်နေ့စဉ်) is a newspaper published in Myanmar. Due to censorship-related law changes in the country, the paper began freely publishing from 1 April 2013.
