= Flower News =

- Type: Weekly newspaper
- Publisher: e-Empire Media group
- Language: Burmese
- Headquarters: Burma

Flower News (or The Flower News) (Burmese: ပန်းသတင်း) is a private weekly newspaper first published in 2004 in Myanmar by the e-Empire Media Group.

== See also ==
- List of newspapers in Burma
