= Myanmar Now =

News agency in Myanmar

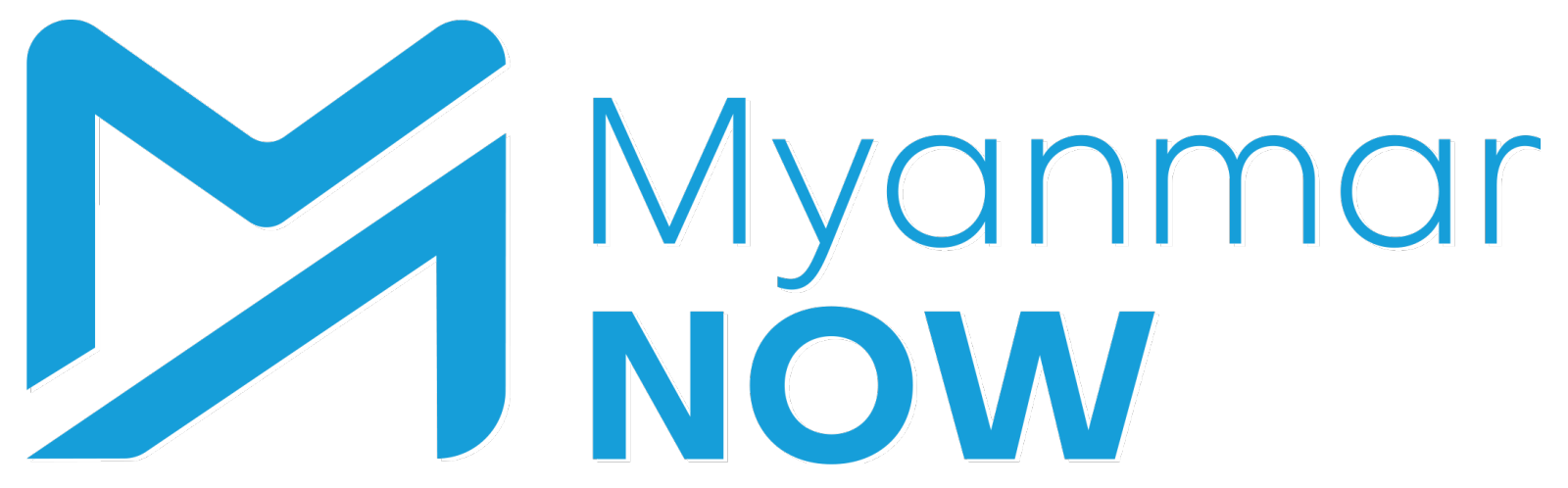
- Native name: မြန်မာနောင်း
- Industry: News agency
- Founded: August 2015; 11 years ago
- Headquarters: Pabedan Township, Yangon, Myanmar
- Area served: Myanmar
- Key people: Swe Win, Editor-in-Chief
- Number of employees: 30 (2019)
- Website: www.myanmar-now.org

Myanmar Now (Burmese: မြန်မာနောင်း) is a news agency based in Myanmar (Burma). Myanmar Now journalists publish bilingual Burmese and English articles on an eponymous online news portal. The agency provides free syndication throughout the country, with a distribution network of over 50 national and local media outlets that regularly republish its stories. As of September 2019, Myanmar Now had a readership of over 350,000, and a team of 30 journalists. The news service is noted for its in-depth reporting on high-impact issues, including corruption, child labor, human rights, and social justice.

== History ==
Myanmar Now was established by the Thomson Reuters Foundation in 2015 to support in-depth independent journalism, in the lead-up to the 2015 Myanmar general election. The news service officially launched in August of that year. The agency is led by Swe Win, its chief correspondent and editor-in-chief. Its founding chief correspondent was Thin Lei Win, a Reuters journalist. Since the inception of the news service, several Myanmar Now journalists, including Swe Win, have been threatened and assaulted by military and legal authorities for their work.

After the 2021 Myanmar coup d'état, the military junta cracked down on independent journalism in the country. Authorities detained Myanmar Now journalists, including Kay Zone Nwe. On 8 March 2021, soldiers raided the Myanmar Now headquarters, before the military junta revoked the operating licenses of Myanmar Now and four other media outlets, namely Mizzima, Democratic Voice of Burma (DVB), Khit Thit Media, and 7Day News, amidst the ongoing protests against the military coup.

== Awards and recognition ==
Myanmar Now has been widely cited by international media outlets such as the BBC, Reuters, and The Guardian for its independent investigations into human rights abuses and corruption in Myanmar. The news agency and its journalists have received several prestigious international awards recognizing their courage and commitment to press freedom and investigative reporting.

In 2016, Myanmar Now reporter Htet Khaung Lin won the Lorenzo Natali Media Prize awarded by the European Commission for a report on underage sex workers in Myanmar. That same year, it received an honorable mention in the Society of Publishers in Asia Awards for investigative reporting, namely a piece on the 969 Movement.

In 2019, Swe Win won the Ramon Magsaysay Award for Emergent Leadership, for his leadership in fostering journalistic integrity and quality in Myanmar as Myanmar Now's editor-in-chief.

In a group with other collaborating news organizations, Myanmar Now was awarded an Online Journalism Award for "2020 Excellence in Collaboration and Partnerships", specifically for reporting on pangolins.

In 2021, Myanmar Now's editor-in-chief, Swe Win, received the Shorenstein Journalism Award from Stanford University's Walter H. Shorenstein Asia-Pacific Research Center (APARC) for his leadership in advancing press freedom and accountability journalism in Myanmar.

In 2022, Myanmar Now won the "SOPA Award for Excellence in Human Rights Reporting" (regional level) for its coverage of human rights abuses following the 2021 military coup.

In 2023, Myanmar Now received the Free Media Pioneer Award jointly presented by the International Press Institute (IPI) and International Media Support (IMS), recognizing its "courageous commitment to independent investigative journalism" despite severe repression under Myanmar's military regime.

== See also ==
- Myanmar Times
- Frontier Myanmar
- The Irrawaddy
