= The Union Daily =

- Type: Daily
- Language: Burmese
- Headquarters: Yangon, Myanmar
- Website: uniondaily.net

The Union Daily (Burmese: ပြည်ထောင်စုနေ့စဉ်) is a newspaper published in Myanmar. Due to censorship-related law changes, the paper began freely publishing from 1 April 2013. The Union Daily is backed by the Union Solidarity and Development political party, but promises not to be a "mouthpiece" for the party.
