= Eleven Media Group =

Myanmar-based newspaper

Eleven Media Group was founded in 2000 by Than Htut Aung in Yangon, Myanmar. In 2012 it had five weekly publications in the Burmese, specializing in news and sports,, employed 250 staff, and had a combined circulation of 450,000 copies.

Reporters without Borders awarded its publication Weekly Eleven the 2011 "Media of the Year" prize for its long standing resistance to censorship and working in repressive conditions under the military government. The company made a comprehensive agreement with Nation Multimedia Group Plc of Thailand in May 2012.

In contrast to its previous reputation, after Myanmar's 2021 military coup the company's publications were seen as favoring the new military government, leading to a widespread boycott of newspaper The Daily Eleven.

On 23 May 2026, Eleven Media Group announced that print divisions of The Daily Eleven would permanently shut down on 31 May as part of "total digital restructuring."

== Publications ==
- First Eleven Sports Journal - founded 2000
- Premier Eleven Sports Journal - founded 2003
- Weekly Eleven - founded 2005
- Biweekly Eleven - founded 2008
