= Thet Zin =

Thet Zin is an editor of the Myanmar Nation weekly journal. He was arrested on 28 February 2008 for having a copy of a United Nations human rights report, a violation of the Printers and Publishers Act. He was sentenced to seven years in prison.
