= Kyaw Soe Oo =

Myanmar journalist

- ကျော်စိုးဦး
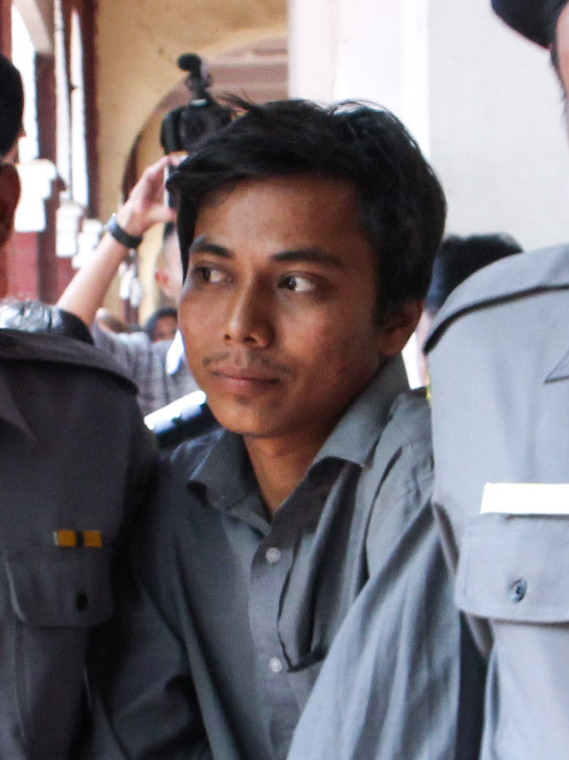
- Kyaw Soe Oo during an escort from arrest in 2018
- Born: Rakhine, Myanmar
- Occupation: Journalist
- Spouse: Chit Su Win
- Children: 1 daughter
- Awards: Pulitzer Prize for International Reporting winners

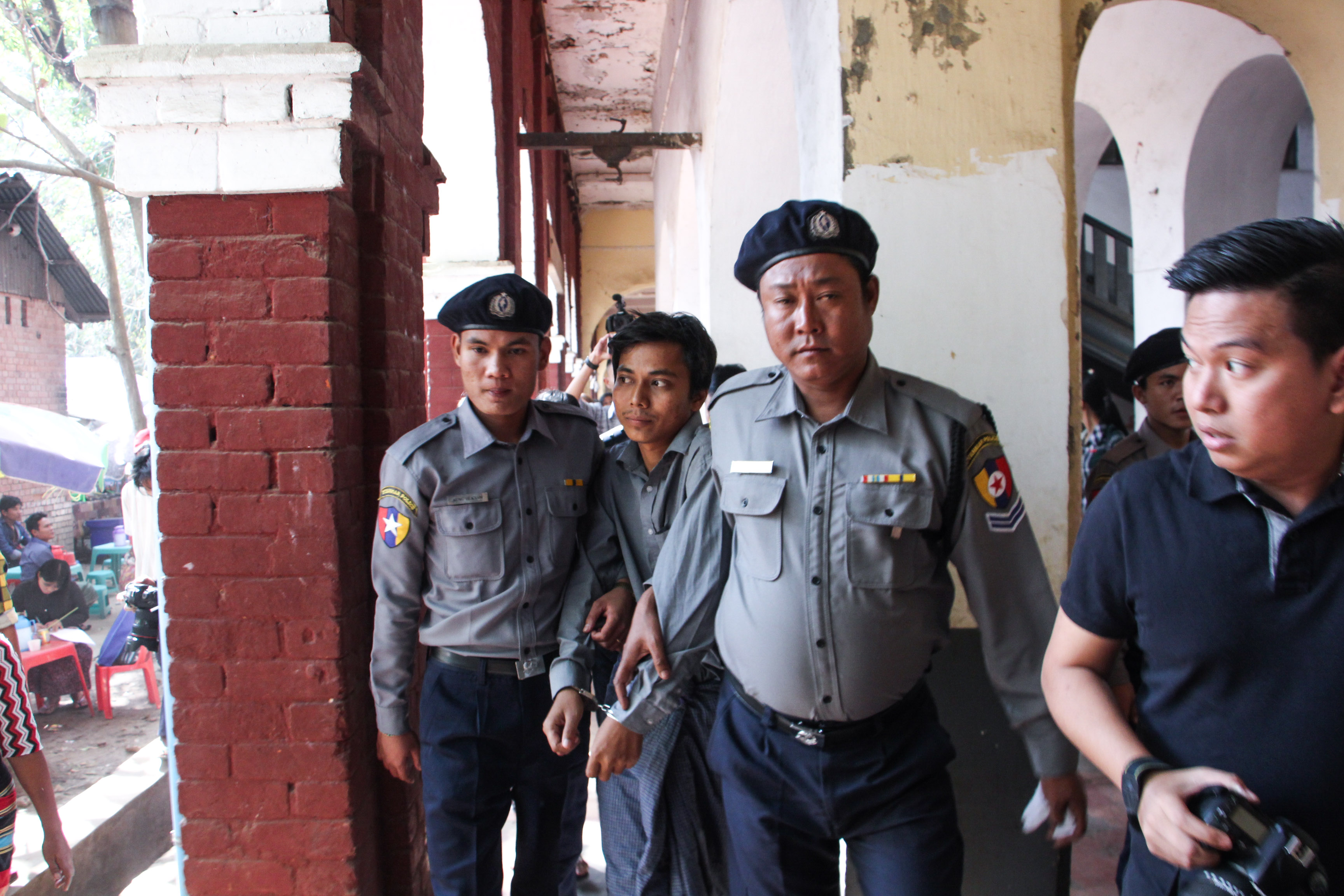
Police escorting detained Reuters journalist Kyaw Soe Oo

Kyaw Soe Oo (Burmese: ကျော်စိုးဦး) is a Burmese Reuters journalist who, with fellow reporter Wa Lone, was arrested on 12 December 2017 in Myanmar because of their investigation into the Inn Din massacre. A police witness testified that their arrests were a case of entrapment. It is believed their arrests were intended to intimidate journalists.

The case received international attention. During 2018, Wa Lone and Kyaw Soe Oo received a number of international awards, including being listed among Time magazine's Persons of the Year for 2018. They have been the subject of human rights appeals by Amnesty International, PEN America, and Reporters Without Borders.

The 2019 UNESCO/Guillermo Cano Press Freedom Prize was awarded to Kyaw Soe Oo and Wa Lone on 11 April 2019 for their "courage and commitment to freedom of expression". On 16 April 2019, the two journalists were awarded the Pulitzer Prize for International Reporting. They were released on 7 May 2019 after a presidential amnesty.

== Early life ==
Oo is from a Rakhine Buddhist family in Sittwe.

== Career ==
Oo began working as a journalist for Root Investigative Agency, an outlet for Rakhine news. After violence began in northern Rakhine, Oo began working for Reuters. Oo, along with fellow Reuters journalist Wa Lone, was investigating the Inn Din massacre; they were arrested on 12 December 2017 and released on 7 May 2019. Ara Darzi and Amal Clooney were involved in securing their release.

== Inn Din massacre ==
Following attacks on the Rohingya people of Rakhine State, Myanmar, in late August 2017, and the burning of Rohingya homes in the hamlet of Inn Din, many Rohingya villagers fled to the mountains. On 1 September 2017, armed soldiers and paramilitaries detained ten Rohingya men who reportedly had gone to the beach to look for food. The next morning they were shot, killed, and buried in a mass grave.

Wa Lone and Kyaw Soe Oo were investigating the mass grave found in Inn Din. They interviewed Buddhist villagers and security personnel and gathered both verbal accounts and photographic evidence of the massacre.

== Personal life ==
Oo is married to Chit Su Win. They met while she previously worked for his family. They have a daughter named Moe Thin Wai Zan.

== Awards and honors ==
- 2018, included in Time magazine's Persons of the Year, which recognized several persecuted journalists as "guardians" in a "war on truth".

The following 2018 awards were received jointly with Wa Lone:

- 2018, Foreign Affairs Journalism category and Global Investigation of the Year at the British Journalism Awards.
- November 26, 2018, Journalists of the Year at Foreign Press Association Media Awards, London
- 2018, PEN/Barbey Freedom to Write award, PEN America & Edwin Barbey Charitable Trust
- 2018, Osborn Elliot Prize for excellence in journalism, Asia Society
- 2018, International Journalists of the Year, One World Media Awards
- 2018, James Foley Medill Medal for Courage in Journalism, Northwestern University
- 2018, Don Bolles Medal, Investigative Reporters and Editors (IRE)
- 2018, Aubuchon Press Freedom Award, National Press Club (United States) & Journalism Institute
- 2019, UNESCO/Guillermo Cano World Press Freedom Prize
- 2019, Pulitzer Prize for International Reporting
