= Thomson Reuters Foundation =

London-based charitable arm of Thomson Reuters

- Founded: 1983
- Headquarters: London, United Kingdom
- Key people: Antonio Zappulla (CEO)
- Services: Journalism training; Media development; Free legal assistance; Corporate governance
- Revenue: £11,454,000 (2024)
- Total assets: £13,536,000 (2024)
- Number of employees: 166 (2024)
- Website: www.trust.org

Thomson Reuters Foundation is the London-based corporate foundation of Thomson Reuters, a Canadian news conglomerate. The Foundation is registered as a charity in the United States and United Kingdom and is headquartered in Canary Wharf, London. The Foundation also has regional hubs in New York City, U.S.A, and Nairobi, Kenya.

Antonio Zappulla has been CEO since 2016.

== History ==
=== Beginnings and historical services ===
In September 1997, in the aftermath of the Rwandan genocide, the Reuters Foundation launched AlertNet, a website providing free humanitarian news and information. AlertNet was set up to address the slow media response to the genocide, and aimed to facilitate co-ordination among relief workers.

In 2004, the Foundation created Iraq's first independent national news agency, Aswat al-Iraq (Voices of Iraq), with support from the United Nations Development Programme (UNDP) and the Spanish International Cooperation Agency (AECI).

In January 2010, following the Haitian earthquake, the Foundation launched an Emergency Information Service (EIS) aimed at providing practical, life-saving information to survivors in local languages.

The Foundation also created polls for The World’s Most Dangerous Countries for Women (2011), Best and Worst G20 Countries for Women (2012), Best and Worst Arab League Countries for Women (2013), the Most Dangerous Transport Systems for Women (2014), and the Five Key Issues Facing Women Working in the G20 (2015).

In the past, the Foundation set up and managed independent news platforms. The Foundation launched Aswat Masriya in 2011, an independent Egyptian news website which closed in 2017 due to lack of funding. Ahead of the country's first general elections in November 2015, the Foundation also launched Myanmar Now, a new portal dedicated to free and independent journalism in Myanmar led by Burmese journalists. The latter won the European Commission’s Lorenzo Natali Media Prize 2015 for a feature on underage sex workers.

=== Thomson Reuters Foundation ===
Following the acquisition of Reuters by the Canadian group Thomson Corporation on 17 April 2008, the Foundation scaled down its grant-making activities, revamped existing programmes and launched new projects – all aimed at leveraging the skills and expertise of the company.

Currently, the Foundation - led by CEO Antonio Zappulla - has three focus areas: to bolster the resilience of independent media, strengthen access to the law, and foster responsible business practices.

Its mission is to strengthen free, fair and informed societies.

== Current services ==
=== TrustLaw ===
Created in 2010, TrustLaw is the largest global pro bono network that connects law firms and corporate legal teams with NGOs and social enterprises to provide free legal support, research and resources.

=== Legal Service for Independent Media ===
The Foundation’s Legal Service for Independent Media offers tailored support to equip journalists, newsrooms and media freedom focused non-profits to counter legal threats and strengthen their resilience.

=== Journalism and media training ===
Since 1983, the Foundation has provided skills-based training programmes to over 20,000 journalists in more than 170 countries across the globe.

Set up in 2006 and part of the Department of Politics and International Relations at the University of Oxford, the Foundation funds the Reuters Institute for the Study of Journalism (RISJ), a research centre for international comparative journalism. The institute accepts around 30 Journalist Fellows every year as part of the Journalist Fellowship Programme. Over the past four decades, more than 200 Fellows from 60+ countries have been funded by the Foundation.

=== Context ===
The Foundation hosted Context, (formerly Alertnet, then Thomson Reuters Foundation News), a global newsroom that contextualises how critical issues affect ordinary people, society, and the environment. Context ceased publication in February 2026.

Context had correspondents in Britain, Spain, Italy, Lebanon, the United States, Colombia, Mexico, Brazil, India, Malaysia, Thailand, Cambodia, Senegal, Kenya, Nigeria, and Cameroon, as well as freelancers in most developing nations. The editorial team, led by Yasir Khan, covered climate change, inclusive economies and the impact of tech on society.

=== Trust Conference ===
Trust Conference, formerly Trust Women, is the Foundation’s global annual forum, which brings together experts, innovators, and activists from across the globe. Focus areas of the conference include threats to democracy, press freedom, shrinking civic space, and responsible and sustainable economies. Past speakers have included Kara Swisher, Cherie Blair, Queen Noor of Jordan, and Nobel laureates Maria Ressa, Kailash Satyarthi and Muhammad Yunus.

=== Workforce Disclosure Initiative ===
The Workforce Disclosure Initiative (WDI) collates data that is voluntarily disclosed by companies on workforce issues across their operations and supply chains, from diversity and inclusion to workplace conditions. The initiative also provides companies and investors with comprehensive, comparable insights to inform their decision-making.

In 2024, after seven years at the responsible investment charity ShareAction, the WDI transferred to the Thomson Reuters Foundation to accelerate its growth through the Foundation’s global networks.

=== AI Company Data Initiative ===
In May 2025, the Foundation launched the AI Company Data Initiative (AICDI) – a voluntary survey to support companies in assessing how AI is embedded in their operations, products and services.

The survey is the world’s largest dataset on corporate AI adoption, and covers factors including: the impact of AI on the workforce, legal accountability, environmental impact, and data privacy and bias.

It is grounded in UNESCO’s Recommendation on the Ethics of AI, the first-ever global standard on AI use.
