= Censorship in Myanmar =

Censorship in Myanmar (formerly called Burma) results from government policies in controlling and regulating certain information, particularly on religious, ethnic, political, and moral grounds.

Freedom of speech and the press are not guaranteed by law. Many colonial-era laws regulating the press and information continue to be used. Until August 2012, all publications (including newspaper articles, cartoons, advertisements, and illustrations) required pre-approval by the Press Scrutiny and Registration Division (PSRB) of the Ministry of Information. However, the 2011–2012 Burmese political reforms signalled significant relaxations of the country's censorship policies and in August 2012 the Ministry of Information lifted the requirement that print media organisations submit materials to the government prior to publication.

As of 2024, Myanmar is considered one of the least free countries in the world in terms of censorship. Freedom House scores it 9 out of 100 on the Global Freedom Index and categorizes it as “not free.” Myanmar ranked 166th out of 180 nations in the 2026 worldwide Press Freedom Index from Reporters Without Borders.

== History ==
=== Konbaung dynasty ===
During the reign of King Mindon Min of Burma's last dynasty, the Konbaung dynasty, the country had one of the freest presses in Asia. The Seventeen Articles, passed in 1873 safeguarded freedom of the press.

=== Colonial era ===
In 1878, after Lower Burma was annexed by the United Kingdom, the Vernacular Press Act was passed, which attempted to repress propaganda against the British government in local language newspapers. In 1898, the Criminal Procedure Code allowed the government to convict people for treason and sedition on grounds of disseminating false information against the state. Soon after, in 1908, the Unlawful Associations Act, was enacted to further stifle freedom of expression.

The Official Secrets Act was passed in 1923, which makes it unlawful for any person to possess classified information from the state. A decade later, the Burma Wireless Telegraphy Act was passed, criminalising possession of telegraphs without government permission. However, there were numerous publications in circulation during the colonial era, with a steady increase. In 1911, there were 44 periodicals and newspapers in circulation, and 103 in 1921. By the end of the 1930s, there were over 200 newspapers and periodicals in circulation, double the amount in 1921.

=== Post-independence era ===
Burma gained independence in 1948. The Constitution of the Union of Burma (1947) guaranteed freedom of expression, guaranteeing the "liberties of thought and expression". Two years later, the Emergency Provisions Act, which criminalised the spreading of false news knowingly and the slandering of civil servants and military officials was enacted. Despite the law, in the 1950s, Burma had one of the freest presses in Asia, with 30 daily newspapers (in Burmese, Chinese, English, and Indian languages).

After the military coup d'état by Ne Win in 1962, the Printers and Publishers Registration Law was enacted. This law, still in function, requires all printers and publishers to register and submit copies of their publications to the Press Scrutiny Board, under the Ministry of Home and Religious Affairs (now under the Ministry of Information). In 1975, the Constitution of the Socialist Republic of the Union of Burma (1975), Article 157, ensured "freedom of speech, expression and publication to the extent that the enjoyment of such freedom is not contrary to the interests of the working people and of socialism."

The Memorandum to all Printers and Publishers Concerning the Submission of Manuscripts for Scrutiny was issued by the Printers and Publishers Central Registration Board. It gave explicit guidelines on materials that would be censored, including those whose contents were injurious to the Burmese socialist program, the state ideology, the socialist economy, national unity, security, peace and public order, pornographic in nature, libelous, slanderous, or critical of the national government. That same year, the State Protection Law was issued, allowing authorities to imprison any persons who have been suspected of being a threat to national peace. This law has been the basis for the arrests of many journalists and writers.

=== 1988 coup d'état ===
After a military coup d'état, led by the State Law and Order Restoration Council (SLORC), in 1988, martial law orders were quickly issued, banning public gatherings, activities, publications, and speeches aimed at dividing the Armed Forces, and criminalising the publication of documents without registration with the state. Martial law orders have since been repealed.

=== Military rule ===
In 1996, several laws were passed to control further dissemination of information in Burma. These include the Law Protecting the Peaceful and Systematic Transfer of State Responsibility and the Successful Performance of the Functions of the National Convention against Disturbances and Oppositions, which prohibits activities aimed at destroying peace, stability, law and order. In addition, it illegalised acts of demeaning the National Convention. Media laws including the Television and Video Act, which requires owners of media players (including televisions, satellites, and videocassette recorders) to obtain licenses from the Ministry of Communications, Posts, and Telegraphs and instituted Video Censorship Boards on domestic-produced videos, and the Motion Picture Law, which requires licenses issued by the Myanmar Motion Picture Enterprise in making films were passed.

Films are subject to censorship by the Motion Picture Censor Board. In addition, The Computer Science Development Law was passed. Under this law, all computer equipment must be approved by the Ministry of Communications, Posts, and Telegraphs. In addition, the distribution, transfer, or acquisition of information that undermines state security, national solidarity and culture, is a criminal offence. SLORC, in 1997, renamed itself the State Peace and Development Council (SPDC). In 2000, the Internet Law, which prohibits posting of writings that are harmful to state interests, was issued by SPDC. Foreign news has also been censored by the government. British Broadcasting Corporation and Voice of America radio broadcasts were jammed, beginning in 1995. Foreign reporters are discouraged from reporting from Myanmar, and are regularly denied entry.

The period saw a number of high-profile journalist arrests, such as Aung Pwint, who was jailed in 1999 for fax-machine ownership and "sending news" to banned papers. In 2008, Myanmar Nation editor Thet Zin was arrested for having a copy of a UN human rights report. In July 2014, five journalists were jailed for ten years after publishing a report accusing the government of planning to build a new chemical weapons plant. Journalists described the jailings as a blow to recently-won news media freedoms that had followed five decades of censorship and persecution.

==== Internet ====
Internet censorship in Burma is classified as selective in the political and Internet tools areas, as substantial in social, and as having no evidence of filtering in conflict/security by the OpenNet Initiative in August 2012. Burma is listed as an Internet enemy by Reporters Without Borders in 2011.

According to a study conducted by OpenNet Initiative (ONI) in 2005, Internet censorship was mostly confined to websites related to pro-democracy groups and those on pornography. In addition, 85% of e-mail service provider sites were blocked. The Myanmar Information Communications Technology Development Corporation (MICTDC) licenses cybercafés. Users are required to register, and owners are required to save screenshots of user activity every five minutes, and upon request, deliver them to MICTDC for surveillance. However, cybercafé regulation is loose.

ONI conducted testing in Burma during August 2012. The results of these tests showed that both the scope and depth of content found to be filtered were drastically reduced compared to all previous rounds of ONI testing dating back to 2005. Restrictions on content deemed harmful to state security, however, remained in place. Pornography is still widely blocked, as is content relating to alcohol and drugs, gambling websites, online dating sites, sex education, gay and lesbian content, and web censorship circumvention tools. In 2012, almost all of the previously blocked websites of opposition political parties, critical political content, and independent news sites were accessible, with only 5 of 541 tested URLs categorised as political content blocked.

=== Political reform ===
In November 2010, shortly after Aung San Suu Kyi's release from house arrest, 10 local publications were suspended for placing "too much importance" on her release in their articles.

Since 10 June 2011, PSRB has allowed publications to self-censor content covering entertainment, sports, technology, health and children's issues, allowing editors to circumvent the mandated practice of submitting report drafts to the PSRB prior to publication. This relaxation has occurred in a series of trials over a span of time. In July 2011, Group 1 publications, consisting of 178 journals and magazines, were no longer censored. In the new system, the first strike requires the publication to pay a K5,000,000 (about US$5,000) deposit. The second strike results in a fine that is withdrawn from that deposit. The depleted amount must be topped up by the publisher or the publication is banned. In December 2011, an additional 54 publications in the business and crime genres were allowed to self-censor their work.

Tint Swe, director of the Press Scrutiny and Registration Division, has publicly called for the abolition of media censorship in the country, stating that it is not in line with democratic practices. Tint Swe has also indicated that censorship for videos and films would be relaxed, without specifying a time frame.

In September 2011, several banned websites, including YouTube, Democratic Voice of Burma and Voice of America were unblocked. Foreign journalists, including those from the British Broadcasting Corporation and the Voice of America, were issued visas to the country the following month. A presidential adviser indicated that press censorship would be abolished in 2012 under new media legislation.

In January 2012, the Ministry of Information announced that it had forwarded a draft of a new media and press law to the Attorney General's Office for review. The draft law, which will need to be approved by the Pyidaungsu Hluttaw (National Parliament), borrows some language from similar laws in Cambodia, Indonesia and Vietnam. The draft law, which is adapted from the 1962 Printers and Publishers Registration Law, will not be submitted during the second parliamentary session.

In August 2012, the Ministry of Information lifted the requirement that print media organisations submit materials to the government before publication; films remained subject to prior censorship. The head of the PSRB, Tint Swe, told the Agence France-Presse that "censorship began on 6 August 1964 and ended 48 years and two weeks later". The Associated Press described the statement as "the most dramatic move yet toward allowing freedom of expression in the long-repressed nation". However, the ban on private ownership of daily newspapers remained, as did a law forbidding the publication of "information relating to secrets of the security of the state". Journalism organisations expressed cautious optimism at the change, but predicted that "a pervasive culture of self-censorship" would remain, as journalists feared long prison sentences associated with libel and state security charges.

As publication legislation slowly ameliorates in Burma in the wake of last August's ban on pre-publication censorship, editorial independence is still hampered by a new requirement for publications to send in published works for post-publication analysis. The PSRB remains a threat to the nation's freedom of press, wielding the same power to audit and sanction publications deemed inflammatory to the Burmese government as it has for the previous five decades. Journalists Wa Lone and Kyaw Soe Oo of Reuters, were charged and jailed on 12 December 2017 by authorities near Rangoon for concealing 'secret papers' which violated a colonial era law. The two Reuters journalists had been covering the predominantly Muslim Rohingyas' exodus from the country due to persecution. On 3 September 2018, the journalists were both sentenced to seven years in prison sparking outrage among the international community.

=== 2021 coup d'état ===
==== Internet ====
After the Myanmar military seized power on 1 February 2021, the people of Myanmar have experienced internet connectivity outages, a frequent shutdown of cellular data for several networks, and controlled or blocked use of some websites. The use of social media including Facebook has been restricted, and social influencers have been arrested due to their anti-coup protests on social media platforms. Facebook, once the dominant platform in Myanmar, now requires a VPN to access, limiting audience reach.

===== Telecommunications =====
Telecommunications companies and internet service providers were ordered to install intercept spyware months before the coup. Junta has assumed control of the biggest telecom firms such as MPT, Mytel. One of the country's biggest telecommunication companies, Telenor, which is owned and operated by the Norwegian government, decided to leave the country, and sell its business to M1 Group. M1 plans to sell 80% of shares to Shwe Byain Phyu which has strong links to the military. The cost of internet access has reportedly increased in Myanmar, making it less affordable for some citizens. This can further limit access to information and communication tools.

==== Newspapers ====
Official newspapers are controlled by the military and the country no longer has any independent newspapers in publication. The military pressured newspapers such as 7 Day News and Eleven to stop publishing. Using article 505 (a) of the Myanmar Penal Code, the military targeted entire news organizations and told the media to not use the term "junta" and "coup d'état" as they would face sanctions as a consequence.

After an August 2026 interview of Min Aung Hlaing, TIME Magazine was banned in Myanmar for allegedly acting "contrary to journalistic ethics."

==== Television ====
The military also imposed a ban on satellite television. They claimed that outside broadcasts threatened state security and anyone who violates the measure is to be punished with one year imprisonment. The ban targeted independent broadcasters such as the Democratic Voice of Burma, Mizzima and other ethnic media such as Kachin-based 74 Media and Shan-based Tachileik News Agency. It also affected foreign news channels broadcast through satellites into the country.

== See also ==
- Media of Burma
- Cinema of Burma
- Literature of Burma
- Human rights in Burma
