= Inn Din massacre =

2017 extrajudicial killing in Rakhine State, Myanmar

- Part of the Rohingya genocide
- The victims of the Inn Din massacre, photographed by soldiers before they were executed at a nearby hill.
- Location: 20°30′46″N 92°34′48″E; Inn Din, Rakhine State, Myanmar
- Date: 2 September 2017 (UTC+6:30)
- Target: Rohingyas
- Attack type: Massacre, extrajudicial killing
- Weapons: Assault rifles, machine guns, machetes, knives
- Deaths: 10
- Perpetrators: 33rd Light Infantry Division of the Myanmar Army and local paramilitaries (8th Security Police Battalion)
- Motive: Anti-Rohingya sentiment, Islamophobia
- Accused: 16
- Charges: Murder
- Verdict: 10 years in prison with hard labour
- Convicted: 7

The Inn Din massacre was a mass execution of Rohingyas by the Myanmar Army and armed Rakhine locals in the village of Inn Din, in Rakhine State, Myanmar on 2 September 2017. The victims were accused of being members of the Arakan Rohingya Salvation Army (ARSA) by authorities. An investigation by Myanmar's military concluded on 10 January 2018 that there was indeed a mass execution of Rohingyas in Inn Din, marking the first instance where the military admitted to extrajudicial killings during their "clearance operations" in the region.

== Background ==
The Rohingya people are an ethnic minority that mainly live in the northern region of Rakhine State, Myanmar, and have been described as one of the world's most persecuted minorities. In modern times, the persecution of Rohingyas in Myanmar dates back to the 1970s. Since then, Rohingya people have regularly been made the target of persecution by the government and nationalist Buddhists. The tension between various religious groups in the country had often been exploited by the past military governments of Myanmar. According to Amnesty International, the Rohingya have suffered from human rights violations under past military dictatorships since 1978, and many have fled to neighbouring Bangladesh as a result. In 2005, the United Nations High Commissioner for Refugees had assisted with the repatriation of Rohingyas from Bangladesh, but allegations of human rights abuses in the refugee camps threatened this effort. In 2015, 140,000 Rohingyas remained in IDP camps after communal riots in 2012.

On 9 October 2016, insurgents of the Arakan Rohingya Salvation Army (ARSA) launched their first large-scale attack on Burmese border posts on the Bangladesh–Myanmar border, with a second large-scale attack on 25 August 2017, leading to new "clearance operations" by the Myanmar government, which critics argued targeted civilians.

== Prelude ==
After ARSA's attacks on 25 August 2017, a troop of around 80 Burmese soldiers arrived in Inn Din on 27 August to recruit local Rakhine Buddhist villagers for "local security". Members of the Tatmadaw (armed forces), the Border Guard Police (BGP) and the local Rakhine community began torching Rohingya homes, whilst keeping Rakhine homes intact. The destruction in Inn Din was confirmed by satellite evidence obtained before and after 28 August. Several hundred Rohingya villagers fled from the west hamlet of Inn Din to the mountains in the east, many with the intent to escape to refugee camps in Bangladesh.

== Massacre ==
On 1 September, many of the villagers who were hiding in the mountains began descending to the beaches of Inn Din in search of food. Armed soldiers and paramilitary members arrived and detained ten men at the beach, whom they accused of being members of ARSA. According to local Rakhine eyewitnesses, the men were moved to the village school at around 5:00 pm, photographed, given a change of clothes, and fed what was to be their last meal. The next morning, on 2 September, the men were photographed again by the military, kneeling on the ground. They were then marched up a hill and shot in the head by soldiers. Soe Chay, a retired soldier and local who supposedly helped dig the mass grave, told Reuters that each victim was shot two to three times. According to Chay, some of the victims managed to survive and made noises whilst being buried alive, prompting a group of local paramilitaries to hack them to death with machetes.

== Victims ==
The victims, all villagers from Inn Din, included fishermen, an Islamic teacher, and two high school students.

- Abulu (17), high school student
- Rashid Ahmed (18), high school student
- Abul Hashim (25), shopkeeper, father of three
- Nur Mohammed (29), farmer-fishmonger
- Abdul Malik (30), village imam, father of five
- Dil Mohammed (35), fishmonger, father of one
- Shoket Ullah (35), fisherman, partially deaf
- Habizu (40), farmer-fishmonger, father of three
- Abdul Majid (45), grocer-farmer, father of eight
- Shaker Ahmed (45), fishmonger, father of nine

== Military investigation ==
Through a Facebook post by Senior General Min Aung Hlaing, the Tatmadaw (armed forces) announced they would investigate reports of a mass grave in the village of Inn Din. On 10 January 2018, the military released their findings in the investigation through a second Facebook post by Min Aung Hlaing. The post stated that there was indeed a mass grave in Inn Din containing bodies of Rohingyas, but that no massacre took place and that those in the grave were "Bengali terrorists" that soldiers had detained in the village cemetery. According to the post, the Rohingyas in the grave were executed by security forces on 2 September 2017, after they were determined to be "Bengali terrorists". This was the first time the military acknowledged extrajudicial killings perpetrated by soldiers during their "clearance operations" in the region.

A statement on behalf of the military was posted by Min Aung Hlaing on his Facebook page on 10 April 2018, announcing that seven soldiers had been convicted of murder for their participation in the executions and sentenced to ten years in prison with hard labour in a "remote area". However, they were all released from prison in November of that year.

== Arrest of Reuters journalists ==
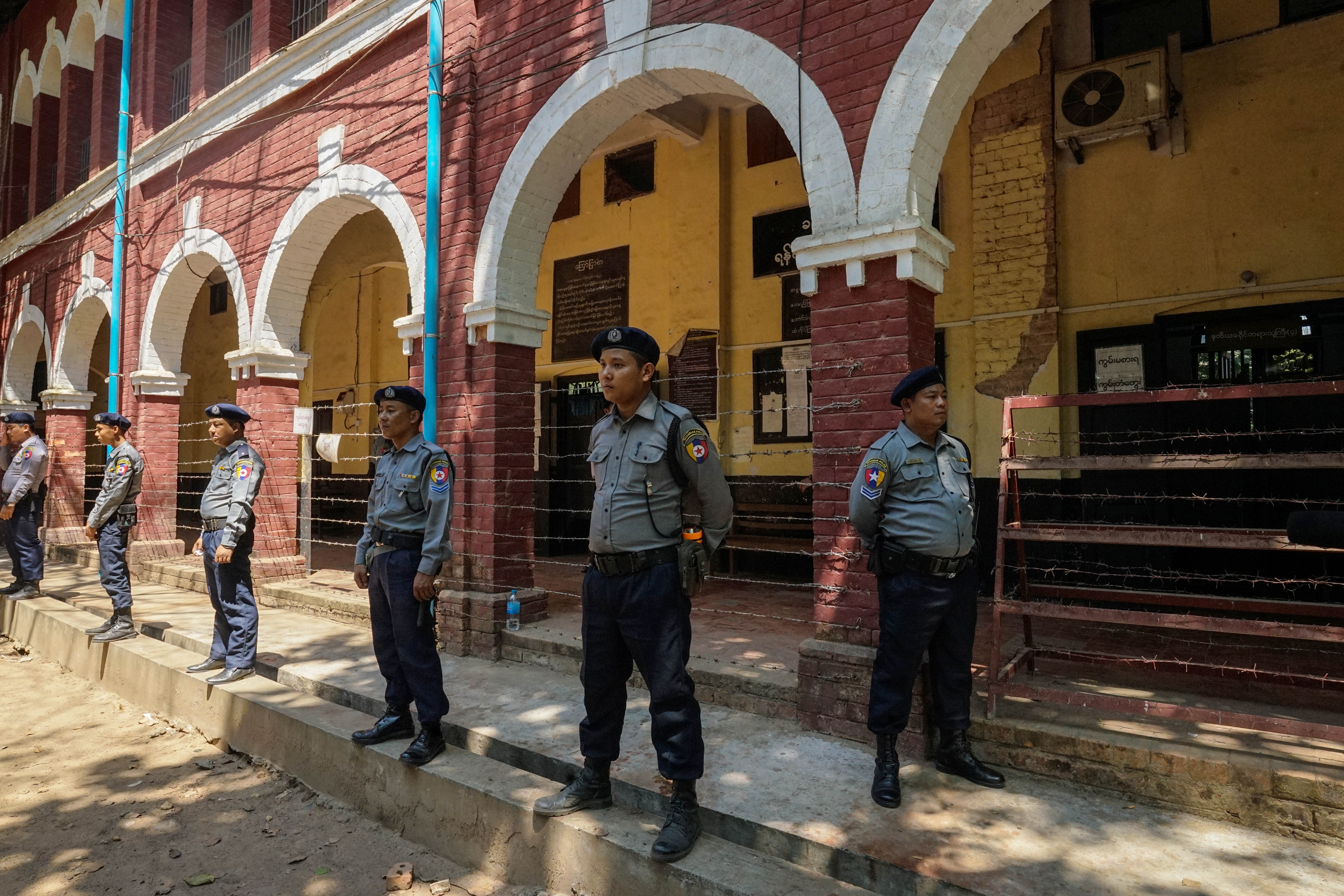
Myanmar police officers stand on guard outside a courtroom in Insein Township during Wa Lone and Kyaw Soe Oo's trial.

On 12 December 2017, members of Myanmar's police force arrested Reuters journalists Wa Lone and Kyaw Soe Oo at a restaurant in Yangon after inviting them to dinner. The pair was charged with possessing classified documents in violation of the colonial-era Official Secrets Act, which carries a possible sentence of 14 years in prison.

The two journalists were independently investigating the mass grave found in Inn Din prior to their arrest. A police witness, Moe Yan Naing, later testified that their arrest was a case of entrapment, and that their arrest was intended to intimidate journalists. After the court held its final preliminary hearing of their case, on 8 February 2018, Reuters released all the findings in their journalists' investigation.

On 3 September 2018, the two journalists were found guilty by a court and sentenced to seven years in prison, despite international criticism. An appeal was filed on 5 November 2018 by the journalists' lawyers.

On 7 May 2019, the two reporters were pardoned by President Win Myint and released from prison.

Wa Lone and Kyaw Soe Oo have received international awards for their reporting of the Inn Din massacre, and were included in Time magazine's Person of the Year 2018, which recognised persecuted journalists as "guardians" in a "war on truth".

== Government responses ==
Myanmar: Prior to Reuters' publication, Myanmar government spokesman Zaw Htay responded to the alleged abuses at Inn Din by saying that the government would investigate them if there was "strong and reliable primary evidence". After the publication was released, Zaw Htay announced that the government would take "action according to the law" against the perpetrators of the massacre, but noted that it was not a response to the publication. Burmese authorities later investigated the Rakhine village administrator who spoke with Reuters. The office of the President of Myanmar announced on 13 February 2018 that 16 suspects had been detained in connection to the massacre. Among them were four military officers, three Tatmadaw soldiers, three policemen, and six villagers. Seven of the suspects were later found guilty of murder.

United States: Nikki Haley, the U.S. ambassador to the United Nations, spoke to the U.N. Security Council on 13 February 2018, calling the Myanmar government's denial of the massacre "preposterous" and the restrictions on travel in Rakhine State a deliberate act to "prevent access to an organisation that might bear witness to their [security forces'] atrocities". Haley also called for the release of the two Reuters journalists who were allegedly imprisoned for their coverage of the massacre. After charges were brought against the two Reuters journalists, the American embassy in Yangon expressed its disappointment, urging authorities to "allow the journalists to return to their jobs and families" and calling the decision "a setback for press freedom and the rule of law in Myanmar".

== See also ==
- 2017 Rohingya persecution in Myanmar
- Northern Rakhine State clashes
- Tula Toli massacre
