= The Voice Weekly =

Burmese news journal

- Editor: Kyaw Min Swe
- Editor-in-Charge: Thu Rein Hlaing
- Categories: News magazine
- Frequency: Weekly
- Publisher: Myanmar Partners Think Tank Group
- Founded: 2004
- First issue: September 2004
- Final issue: July 2012
- Company: Living Color Media Co., Ltd.
- Country: Myanmar
- Based in: Yangon
- Language: Burmese
- Website: thevoicemyanmar.com

The Voice Weekly was a news journal published in Burmese language. The journal was launched in 2004, with the first issue appearing in September 2004. The founding publisher was Myanmar Partners Think Tank Group. It was more focused on Burmese political issues. Its publication was suspended for one week together with 7Days News for publishing Aung San Suu Kyi news on the front page in November 2011. The magazine was suspended by the government in July 2012.

Following the seizure of power by the military government in February 2021, it was officially announced that The Voice Weekly journal would cease publication from March of the same year.
