= Mass media in Myanmar =

The print, broadcast and online mass media in Myanmar (also known as Burma) has undergone strict censorship and regulation since the 1962 Burmese coup d'état. The constitution provides for freedom of speech and the press; however, the government prohibits the exercise of these rights in practice. Reporters Without Borders ranked Myanmar 174th out of 178 in its 2010 Press Freedom Index, ahead of just Iran, Turkmenistan, North Korea, and Eritrea. In 2015, Myanmar moved up to 144th place, ahead of many of its ASEAN neighbours such as Singapore, as a result of political changes in the country.

There have been moves to lift censorship in the country. Tint Swe, head of the country's censorship body, the Press Scrutiny and Registration Division (PSRB), told Radio Free Asia that censorship "should be abolished in the near future" as it is "non-existent in most other countries" and "not in harmony with democratic practices." Myanmar announced on 20 August 2012 that it would stop censoring media before publication. Newspapers and other outlets would no longer have to be approved by state censors, but journalists in the country could still face consequences for what they wrote and said.

In the aftermath of the coup d’état on 1 February 2021, the new regime has reversed previous efforts to reduce censorship, and the country's ranking in the Press Freedom Index has fallen down to 171st out of 180 in its 2024 ranking.

== History ==
=== 19th century–1962 ===
In 1836, the country's first newspaper, The Maulmain Chronicle, was published followed by The Rangoon Chronicle in 1853, later renamed to The Rangoon Times. King Mindon was an advocate of press freedom and encouraged the creation of Myanmar's first Burmese-language newspaper, Yadanapon Naypyidaw Thadinsa (ရတနာပုံနေပြည်တော်သတင်းစာ) to report on him and the Queen, even if it portrayed them in a negative light.

After King Mindon, the media was useful for the resistance of colonialism. King Mindon also established the country's first indigenous press law, the Seventeen Articles, which safeguarded freedom of the press. Several Chinese, Burmese and English-language newspapers were permitted to report news from around the country and internationally, interviewing politicians and interacting with foreign journalists, contrary to most of Myanmar's south-east Asian neighbours.

Throughout the colonial era, there was a steady increase in the number publications in circulation. In 1911, there were 44 periodicals and newspapers in circulation, and 103 in 1921. By the end of the 1930s, there were over 200 newspapers and periodicals in circulation, double the amount in 1921. From the independence of Myanmar from the United Kingdom in 1948 until 1962, the country experienced a temporary period of democracy and free media. The country had one of the freest presses in Asia, with guarantees of freedom of the press in the 1947 Constitution. Journalist U Thaung founded Kyemon (The Mirror Daily) in 1957, and its 90,000 circulation was Myanmar's largest.

=== Under hardline military rule (1962–2010) ===
After the March 1962 coup d'état, journalists quickly responded by forming the Burma Press Council to protect press freedom. Within a month however, several journalists were arrested and publications shut down. By 1988, the number of newspapers had decreased from 30 to 8. The media gradually became the monopoly of the military junta under Ne Win.

The press environment remained tightly controlled in the country. Journalists were often harassed, arrested or jailed for reporting unfavourable news that reflected badly on the country or the regime. The media was also instructed to vilify opposition members. Burmese media acted as the mouthpiece for the regime, as when, during the anti-government protests in 2007, it labelled the protesters as "devils" and blamed foreign media for starting the protests. Several media outlets were closed down after refusing to publish propaganda. However, many outlets stopped publication as a mark of solidarity with the protesters.

Subjects out of bounds for journalists included discussions of democracy, the legitimacy of the regime, political corruption, HIV/AIDS, the aftermath of natural disasters and the national football team losing, though some attempted to hide criticism amongst words or images. Because the media is restricted from reporting negative events in this way, it could often be unreliable. Words by opposition leader Aung San Suu Kyi were rarely covered in the media. Similarly, references to the United Nations were rare, as the junta viewed the organisation as trying to overthrow the regime.

The Burmese state-owned media also spoke ill of the governments of the United States, the United Kingdom, and the European Union. The Burmese government was wary of international media, and as a consequence, many news organisations were banned from reporting in the country. One senior general accused foreign media of "spreading lies" to undermine national unity. Some private media were allowed, though the government owns around 75% stake in it.

In 2007 there were 20 news agencies based in Myanmar, including Agence France-Presse, the Associated Press, Reuters and Xinhua. Exiled media outlets such as the Democratic Voice of Burma based in Oslo, Norway, sought to promote civil society efforts and freedom of expression within Myanmar from abroad, while attempting to offer an uncensored perspective on Burmese affairs to the rest of the world.

=== Period of partial liberalization (2011–2020) ===
Myanmar underwent a communications and technology revolution after 2011 reforms that lifted severe restrictions on the media, mobile phone use, and internet use. The government welcomed international telecom businesses and promoted competition and by 2017, cheap 3G Chinese phones saturated the mobile phone market and the majority of the Burmese population had at least one way to connect to the internet. The most used news and media network in Myanmar is Facebook, which gained popularity because some mobile phone plans available in the country do not count time on Facebook towards their minutes.

With the 2011-2015 Myanmar political reforms, press freedom increased: Myanmar's score in the Press Freedom Index dramatically improved between 2009 and 2012. However, the 2018 sentencing of two Reuters journalists to seven years imprisonment on grounds of possessing police documents was widely seen as an attack on press freedoms, after the journalists had investigated the Inn Din Massacre.

=== After the February 2021 coup ===
Following the coup d’état on 1 February 2021, the new regime stepped up restrictions on the mass media, intimidation and imprisonment of journalists.

== Media laws ==
=== Situation as of 2008 ===
As of 2008, several media laws were in place across print, broadcast and the Internet media:

- The Burma Wireless Telegraphy Act (1933), enacted by the British government in colonial times, made it an offence to have in possession any wireless telegraphy apparatus without permission. The act was amended in 1995/96 by the junta to include fax machines and computers.
- Printers and Publishers Registration Law (1962) required all publishers to submit copies of books and magazines to press scrutiny boards prior to publication for alterations.
- Martial Law Order 3/89 (1989) made it an offence to publish any document without prior registration with the Home and Religious Affairs Ministry.
- The Television and Video Act (1995) required the public and organizations such as the United Nations who possess televisions and video equipment to obtain a license from the Ministry of Communication.
- The Motion Picture Law (1996) stated that licenses to make films must be obtained from the Myanmar Motion Picture Enterprise, which were later censored if necessary.
- The Computer Science Development Law (1996) required the media to have prior permission from the Ministry of Communication before using, importing or possessing computer equipment.
- Internet Law (2000) imposed regulations on postings on the Internet that may be deemed to be detrimental to the country, its policies or security affairs.
- Wide Area Network Establishment and Service Providing order No. 3/2002.
- Electronic Transactions Law (2004) promoted and regulated the Internet and other electronic transactions in a wide variety of ways, including defining penalties of up to 15 years in prison for using electronic transactions (a) to commit "any act detrimental to the security of the State or prevalence of law and order or community peace and tranquility or national solidarity or national economy or national culture", and (b) for "receiving or sending and distributing any information relating to secrets of the security of the State or prevalence of law and order or community peace and tranquility or national solidarity or national economy or national culture".

=== Later developments ===
After the coup in February 2021, the new military government announced an amendment to Myanmar Penal Code article 505(a), which criminalized the making of comments that "cause fear" or "spread false news". It also prohibited the use of the terms “coup,” “junta” and “regime.”

== Newspapers and journals ==
Myanmar has three free of charge, state-owned newspapers that are distributed on a daily basis. From 1965 to 2012, Myanmar did not have freedom of press, and all newspapers were government owned. Reforms were passed in August 2012, lifting the censorship laws. Previously, all newspaper articles, regardless of content, were required to pass through the censor board at the Press Scrutiny and Registration Division, set up by the Ministry of Information in 2005.

Despite the tight press laws, a wide variety of publications were available. Magazines were less affected by the strict press laws compared to newspapers, as many avoided discussions of the political situation. In all, there were 187 weekly journals registered with the Press Scrutiny and Registration Division under the Ministry of Information of July 2009.

After the law was repealed in August 2012, sixteen dailies were granted licenses to publish. The 1962 Printing and Registration Act remains in effect, mandating a seven-year prison term for publishing without a license. On 1 April 2013, the first date newspapers could be published freely, four privately owned dailies – The Voice Daily, Golden Fresh Land, The Standard Time Daily, and The Union Daily – hit newsstands.

The Voice Daily is run by the publishers of The Voice Weekly, which has been published since 2004. Golden Fresh Land is run by Khin Maung Lay who worked for the Mogyo Daily prior to 1964 and has served multiple prison terms for speaking out against the government. The Union Daily' is backed by the Union Solidarity and Development political party, but promises not to be a "mouthpiece" for the party.

The other twelve licensees have thus far failed to make it to publication due to a combination of outdated equipment, insufficient reporters, and trouble securing financing. "To be frank, the government granted licenses much earlier than we expected and we were caught by surprise", said the editor of one private paper. Several papers that have not yet seen the light of day are backed by existing media groups.

There are a large variety of magazines in Myanmar, ranging from monthly to biannual, although their market is smaller compared to the "journals". Topics include Burmese traditional medicine, various magazines published by non-Burmese ethnic groups (like the Shan and Rakhine), Buddhist and astronomy related magazines. There are also about 15 newspapers published daily, devoted entirely to football.

== Television and radio ==
=== Television ===
All broadcast media is owned by the government except for MM which is the only private TV in Myanmar. The Video Act of 1985 outlined what media could tape. There are seven TV stations in Myanmar, of which, MTV1 and MTV2 are the main channels. And another channel by government is MRTV. MRTV-3 is an English-language channel aimed at an international audience. During the 2007 protests, the stations were used to broadcast messages critical of foreign media.(YouTube clip) Due to lack of equipment, newsreaders often have to read directly off their notes instead of an autocue.

Satellite television is no longer illegal and satellite dishes can be seen on many buildings. Local operator Sky Net provides more than 100 channels of local and international origin. Television broadcasts regularly feature members of the military visiting monasteries and handing out gifts of money and religious material. In February 2010, CNN was (temporarily) removed from Burmese TV. It has been speculated this was because the authorities didn't want their citizens to see the predominantly US aid for Haitian earthquake victims.

On 17 February 2018, five private companies signed a cooperation agreement with state-run Myanma Radio and Television to operate as content providers on digital free-to-air channels. The five companies are DVB Multimedia Group, Mizzima Media Co Ltd, KMA TeleMedia Holdings Co Ltd, Fortune Broadcasting Co Ltd and My Multi Media Group Co Ltd.

=== Radio ===
Radio broadcasting began in 1936, with the Burma Broadcasting Service beginning operation ten years later. Today there are several FM stations, three mediumwave stations and three shortwave stations. The short and medium wave stations are all operated by MRTV or the military. The main radio stations are Radio Myanmar (operated by MRTV), Cherry FM, Mandalay FM, FM Bagan, Padamyar FM, Pyinsawaddy FM, Shwe FM and City FM. Radio Myanmar usually begins daily with readings from the governments' "Seven Point Road to Democracy", "Twelve Political, Economic and Social Objectives" and "Three Main National Causes".

Foreign music is now permitted, although a variety of traditional Burmese classics are played most. However, local radio stations often play internationally known songs, re-recorded in Burmese.

Unlike Radio Myanmar, other (commercial) stations are primarily entertainment stations. In the past, radio sets were usually tuned to government stations, however, uncensored information from stations such as BBC, VOA, Radio Free Asia and Democratic Voice of Burma (based in Oslo, Norway) were available from sets smuggled into the country and were (and still are) popular, though some people caught listening to broadcasts were arrested in the past. Before Internet access became available, foreign radio stations were a major source of information, which often helped to break the media blackout in the country.

Given the population of Myanmar, impact from radio and television has not been significant – only 10%, due to poor living conditions.

== Internet media ==
Beginning in September 2011, the historically pervasive levels of Internet censorship were significantly reduced. International news sites, including Voice of America, BBC, and Radio Free Asia, long blocked by Burmese censors, had become accessible overnight. A number of previously censored independent Myanmar-focused news sites which had been highly critical of Myanmar's ruling regime, such as the Democratic Voice of Burma and Irrawaddy, were suddenly accessible. Following the reduction in online censorship, the head of Myanmar's press censorship department described such censorship as "not in harmony with democratic practices" and a practice that "should be abolished in the near future."

Internet access varies due to electricity shortages. The Internet has yet to make a significant impact in Myanmar, where according to official statistics, as of July 2010, there were only 400,000 Internet users (0.8% of the population). More recently, following the reduction in SIM card prices from between $200 and $1,500 before 2012 to $1.50 by 2014 these numbers are likely to have dramatically increased because of the widespread popularity of smart-phones. 3G and 4G mobile phone services are available.

Prior to September 2011 the internet in Myanmar was more strictly controlled, with access blocked to websites critical of the junta, Burmese exile groups, and foreign media. Government approval was usually needed to own a computer and other electronic devices capable of accessing outside information. However, during the anti-government protests in 2007, some footage was posted on video sharing sites like YouTube and Flickr which gave international media an inside look at the protests.

== See also ==
- Censorship in Myanmar
- Freedom of the press in Myanmar
