= Women's League of Burma =

The Women's League of Burma (Burmese: အမျိုးသမီးများအဖွဲ့ချုပ် (မြန်မာနိုင်ငံ), romanized: aamyoesameemyarraahpwalhkyaote (myanmarninengan)) is a community-based organization advocating for the rights of women in Burma, with a focus on addressing systematic sexual violence in ethnic regions and promoting women's participation in political processes, particularly in peace initiatives. It is a membership organisation comprising various ethnic minority women groups from Burma.

The organization's headquarters are located in Chiang Mai, Thailand, with additional offices throughout the region.

== History ==
The Women's League of Burma was established in 1999 on the Thai–Burma border by a coalition of exiled Burmese women activists who had fled the country following political persecution after the 1988 pro-democracy movement and the continuing civil wars in ethnic minority areas. Among its key founders was veteran democracy activist Thin Thin Aung. Under the military regime, which was accused of using systematic sexual violence as a tool of control, countless women and families were forced to seek refuge in border regions and neighboring countries such as Thailand and Bangladesh.

Several groups united to organize an annual forum for these women's organizations, inspired by the Panglong Agreement. On December 9 1999, the groups concluded that a unified voice would better concentrate resources and strengthen their advocacy for common goals, particularly in political processes.

WLB unites more than a dozen ethnic women's organizations, including the Karen Women's Organization, Kachin Women's Association Thailand, and Shan Women's Action Network, among others. The league advocates for women’s participation in peace processes, constitutional reform, and national reconciliation efforts. It also campaigns for justice and accountability for survivors of conflict-related sexual violence, documenting abuses committed by the military in ethnic minority regions.

Among its key publications, the WLB has released several reports such as Same Impunity, Same Patterns and If They Had Hope, They Would Speak—both of which expose systematic sexual violence and impunity within the Myanmar military. These reports have been used by international organizations and UN bodies to highlight crimes against humanity and advocate for a United Nations Commission of Inquiry into abuses in Myanmar. WLB also works to empower women through leadership training, political education, and advocacy workshops along the Thai–Myanmar border and in ethnic communities. The organization has participated in international human rights forums, including CSW and CEDAW (Convention on the Elimination of All Forms of Discrimination against Women), where it has submitted shadow reports to document Myanmar’s gender-based violations and lack of protection mechanisms.

Since the 2021 Myanmar coup d'état, WLB has played an active role in condemning the junta's repression and advocating for the release of detained women activists, including its co-founder Thin Thin Aung. The group continues to operate largely in exile, coordinating humanitarian aid, documenting gender-based violence, and pushing for international accountability mechanisms.

== Profile ==
Women's League of Burma is the only women's political organisation involved in the constitution-drafting activities of the pro-democracy movement, the Federal Constitution Drafting Coordinating Committee, supported by the Center for Constitutional Democracy in Plural Societies at the Indiana University Maurer School of Law.

== Member organisations ==
The Women's League of Burma member organisations include:

- Burmese Women's Union (BWU)
- Kachin Women's Association - Thailand (KWAT)
- Karen Women's Organisation (KWO)
- Karenni National Women's Organisation (KNWO)
- Kayan Women's Organisation (KYWO)
- Kuki Women's Human Rights Organisation (KWHRO)
- Lahu Women's Organisation (LWO)
- Palaung Women's Organisation (PWO)
- Pa-O Women's Union (PWU)
- Rakhaing Women's UNion (RWU)
- Shan Women's Action Network (SWAN)
- Tavoy Women's Union (TWU)
- Women's Rights and Welfare Association of Burma (WRWAB)

== Awards ==
In 2008, the organization received the Democracy Award from the National Democratic Institute (NDI). The award was accepted on behalf of the league by Thin Thin Aung, who dedicated it to the brave women and Buddhist nuns who faced violence and imprisonment for their role in the 2007 Saffron Revolution.

One of their noted activists, Khin Ohmar, won the 2008 Anna Lindh Prize and the 2008 Vital Voices Global Leadership Award for Human Rights, which she shared with SWAN activist Charm Tong.

== See also ==
- Women in Burma
