= Women's rights in Myanmar =

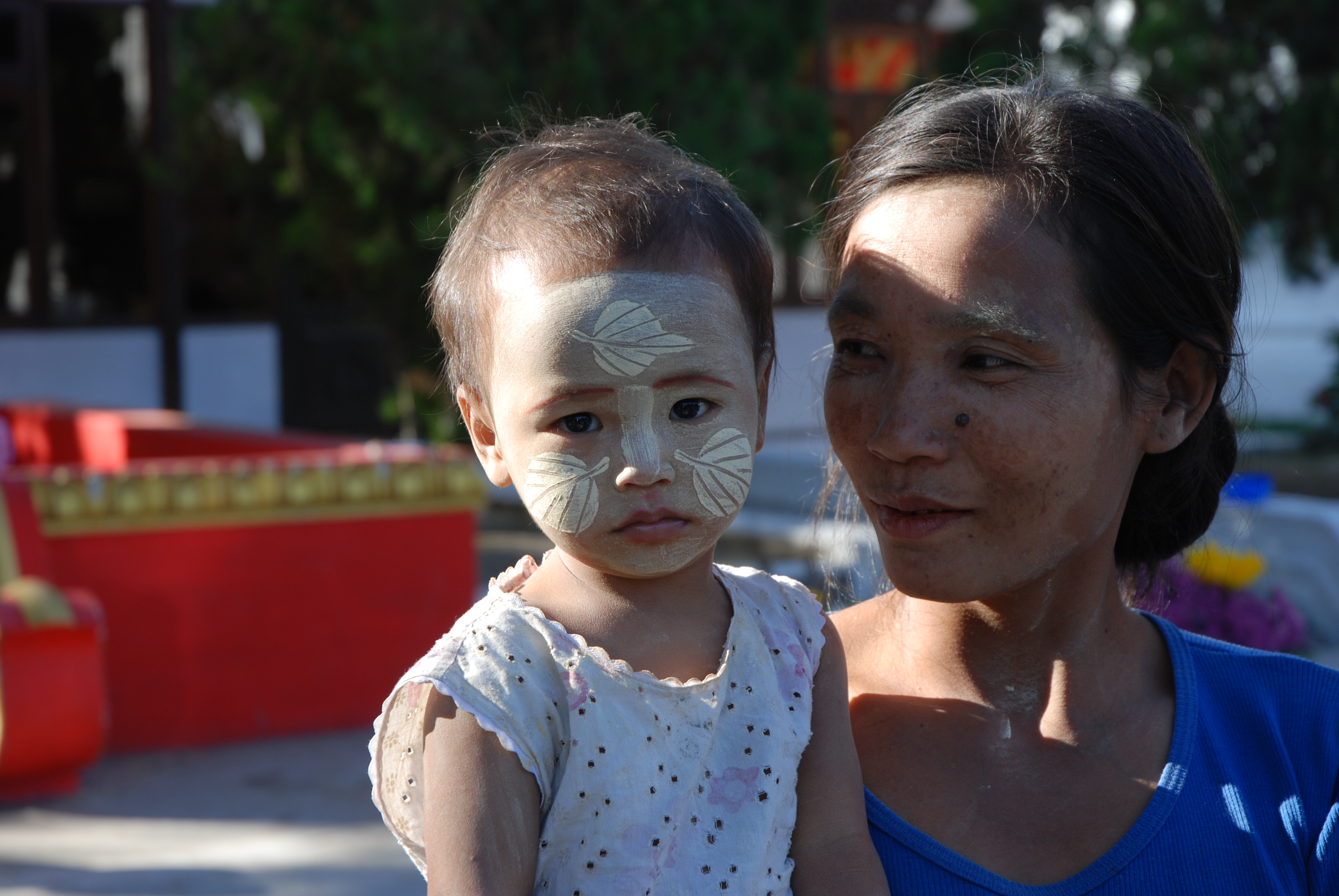
A Burmese woman with a child

Women living in Myanmar continue to face barriers to equality. After forty years of isolation, myths about the state of women's rights in Myanmar (Burma) were centered around the conception that Burmese women face less gender discrimination and have more rights than women in surrounding Southeast Asian nations. After Myanmar opened its borders in 2010, gender discrimination began to be seen by the international community. However, women in Myanmar are experiencing danger, persecution, and a decline of freedoms since the 2021 coup. Since the junta took hold of the government, there have been over 1,000 confirmed murders of women by the military, and over 5,000 arrests. Currently, a variety of organizations—both domestic and international—strive to educate people that this is a misconception to better make strides towards protecting women's rights in Myanmar.

Myanmar's legal framework, traditions, and religious beliefs protect women's rights. However, many concepts of the traditional role of women continue to keep women in Myanmar from gaining advancement. Traditionally, a woman in Myanmar is responsible for her family's well-being, while the husband earns the income for the household. Women continue to remain underrepresented in government positions, and women living in rural areas of the country face fewer opportunities for advancement than women in more urban areas of the country. Additionally, women belonging to ethnic minority groups face added discrimination and barriers to access, particularly those who are not Buddhist.

Governmental strides towards women's equality have been made, particularly in establishing institutional agencies to address women's representation. Additionally, there have been changes centering general women's rights and women's representation. Despite this, there are still large cultural barriers, as well as additional disparities in access for women who are rural or ethnic minorities.

== Constitutional rights ==
Myanmar’s Constitution (Section 347) includes a guarantee of equal rights and equal legal protection to all persons and (Section 348) does not discriminate against any Myanmar citizen based on sex. Myanmar has been an active participant of the Association of Southeast Asian Nations (ASEAN) Committee on Women as well as the ASEAN Commission on Protection and Promotion of the Rights of Women and Children in 2010.

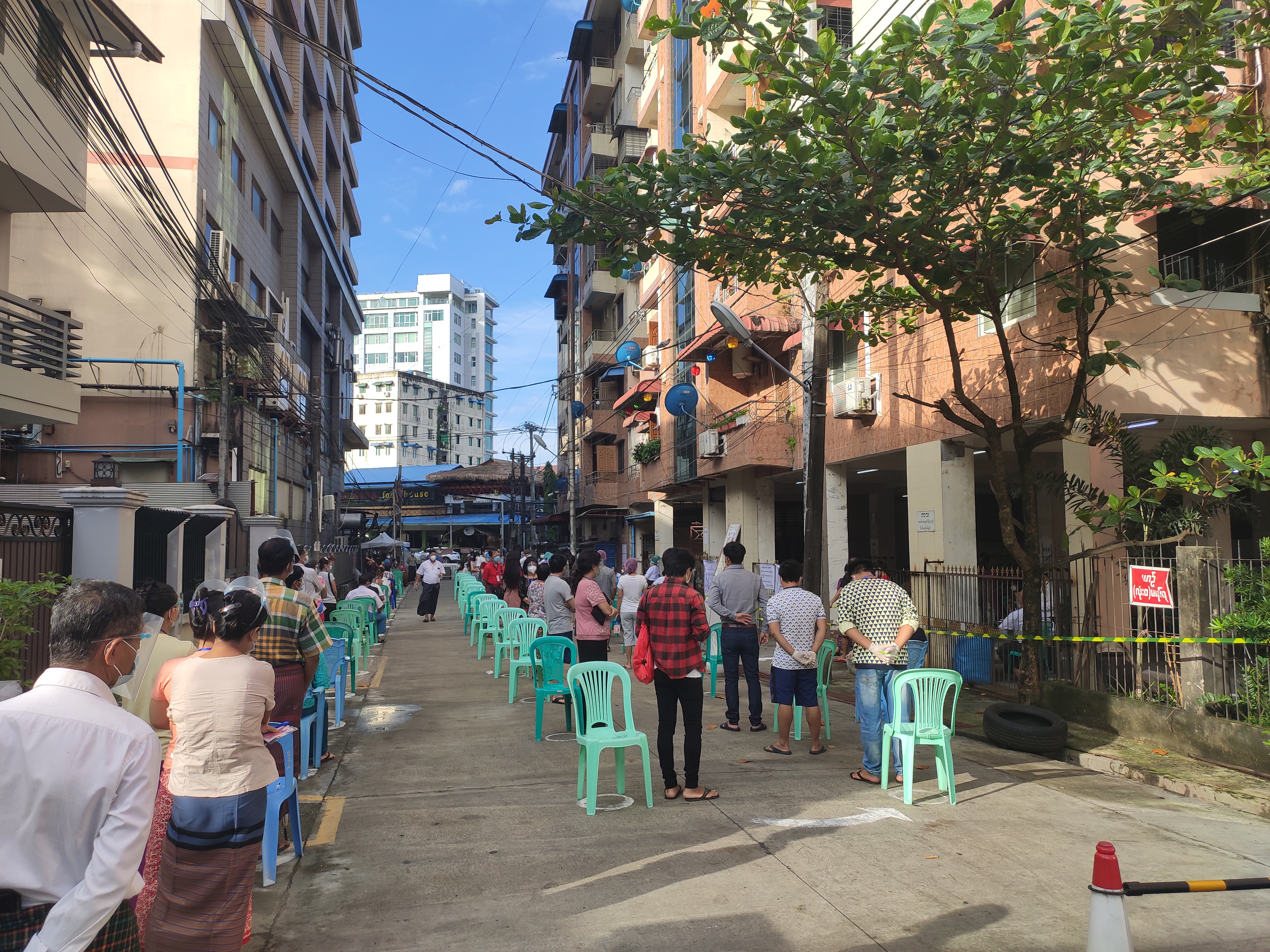
Voters queue up outside a polling station during the 2020 Myanmar elections

However, the United Nations Committee on the Elimination of Discrimination against Women (CEDAW Committee) has expressed concern about women's rights in Myanmar because Myanmar's active participation in advocating for women’s rights has translated to a belief that there is gender equality in the country. But the 2008 Constitution of Myanmar contains references to women mostly as mothers, which reinforces the stereotype of a woman's role being that of a mother and caretaker in need of protection. The current lack of measures to achieve gender equality in both domestic legislation and the Constitution is of concern to the Committee on the Elimination of Discrimination against Women.

== Representation in government and politics ==
Women in Myanmar remain largely underrepresented in elected positions. Women have been historically underrepresented, and while women's officeholding has seen some recent increase, women's rights activists in Myanmar argue the government has been unwilling to promote women's representation.

Claribel Irene Po was the first female minister in the Union government of Myanmar. As of 2019, she was only one of four female ministers in Myanmar since 1920.

In the 2020 election, representation for women in Myanmar's National Parliament increased; however, not as much as many women's rights activists anticipated: in 2018, the percentage of women in the National Parliament rested at only 11.32%, but saw an increase to 16.83% of the seats in 2020. There are no resources at female candidates' disposal for female candidate-specific trainings from any source. However, women received the most support overall from Myanmar's political parties, particularly in areas such as campaign financing and voter outreach. Myanmar has used a plurality, first-past-the-post electoral system since 2010. Following the 2020 elections and what many women's rights activists considered a smaller increase in women's representation than expected, activists are calling for a proportional representation electoral system.

Women are also severely underrepresented in local government. Before the 2020 elections, women were less than 1% of Ward/Village Tract Administrators. Ward and village public meetings often have a strong attendance of female attendees, however women are unlikely to hold leadership positions or even voice opinion when they attend the meetings.

== Education ==
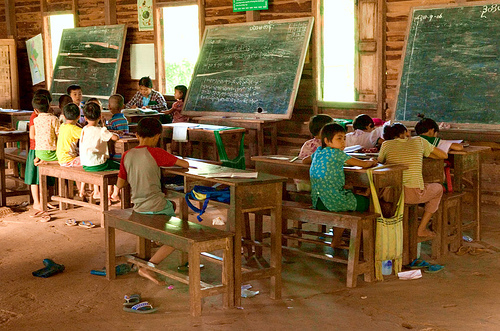
Children at a local school in Hsipaw, Shan State

The equal right to education for men and women is guaranteed by Myanmar’s Constitution. In 2008, Myanmar's new Constitution prioritized education after years of under-prioritization of education in the previous military rule. Between 2008 and 2013, because of the government's encouragement of education policies, Myanmar saw a rise in the number of girls attaining education. Currently, there are more women than men in Myanmar's education system. The literacy rate for adult women is 86% compared to just over 90% for men. Education is co-educational at all levels. Despite the progress, there are continued traditional cultural barriers that prevent women from capitalizing on their educational attainment.

There are extreme disparities between urban and rural educational performance. The Shan Stateregion of Myanmar has the lowest female literacy rates at 59.4%. Additionally, while a growing proportion of women are pursuing higher education, this number does not match the future employment fate of women, where men make up a larger proportion of those in the workforce. Moreover, women still do not occupy senior levels of economic decision-making, despite their higher education.

== Health and wellbeing ==
In 2010, Burmese women’s life expectancy was 69.9 years. Myanmar has a high mortality rate with 200 deaths per 100,000 live births, an improvement from the 520 deaths per 100,000 births in 1990. Leading causes of maternal death according to the government’s 2006-2011 National Health Plan are postpartum hemorrhage, eclampsia, and complications from unsafe abortions. The majority of maternal deaths occur at home, only 38% of women with labor complications were referred to a hospital in 2010, and only 24% reached the hospital; the other 14% died en route because of delayed referral or transportation delays.

While abortion is illegal in Myanmar, around 10 percent of all maternal deaths are reported to be abortion-related. There is a 20% unmet need for contraception among married women. The lack of sex education across the country results in a high adolescent fertility rate of 16.9%.

Cultural taboos around women’s sexuality in Myanmar prevent open conversation regarding sexual and reproductive health and rights among women in the country. If a woman has experienced sexual assault prior to marriage, it is common that once married, they have little control over sexual relations within the marriage. Moreover, most women who reported incidents of sexual violence entered into marriage under conditions of social or economic vulnerability. This highlights a mentality of male entitlement over their wives’ bodies. In 2013, it is estimated that 69,489 of females in Myanmar had HIV accounting for 34% of the total HIV cases in Myanmar.

Since the 2021 coup, adolescent girls in Myanmar have experienced detriments to their mental health, amongst ongoing fear and conflict. Over 40% of surveyed girls reported directly experiencing armed conflict, almost one-third of girls had considered self-harm, and nearly 70% stated that they could not sleep due to unhappiness.

== Marriage and family ==
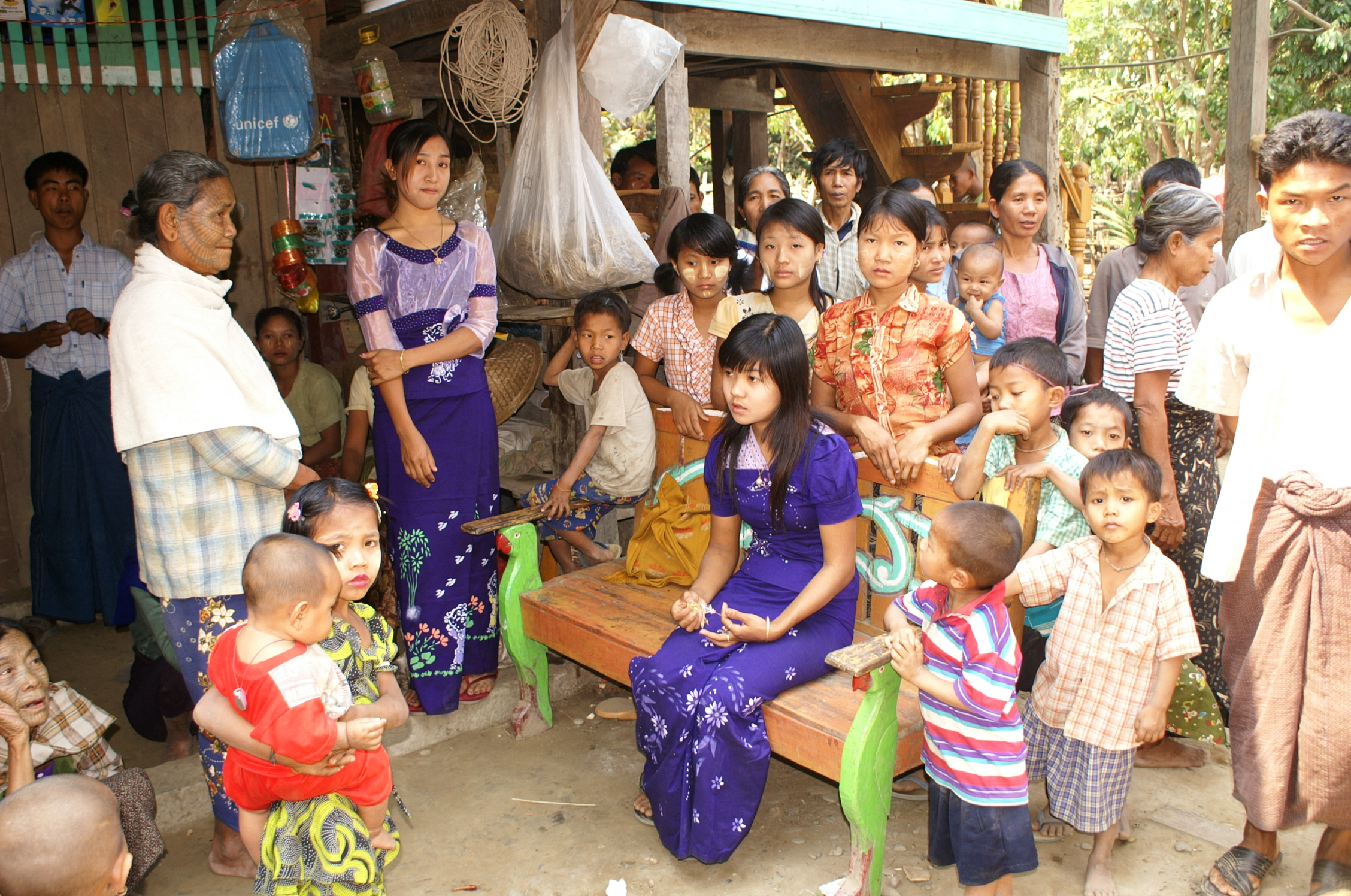
A traditional marriage ceremony in Chin State

Usually, Burmese women have the freedom to choose their own husbands,, despite the continued presence of matchmaking traditions and parental say in the decision that occasionally still occur. Legally one can get married at 20 years of age in Myanmar. In 1973, the average age for a female to marry was 21.2 years old, which increased to 26 years of age in 1997. In Myanmar, there is no practice of having a family name, as seen in Western cultures.

A woman will retain her own given birth name throughout her life, whether she marries or remains single. Typically, we see women are allowed to make decisions regarding their household spending without permission from their husbands, although males are considered the heads of the household. It is expected that once married, a woman will have children and infertility can be grounds for divorce.

With respect to the law, a woman can jointly or separately hold assets with her husband. In the case of the husband's death, the woman then inherits the property. In the event of divorce, the assets are divided equally unless the woman is dependent on her husband, in which case she receives only one-third of the previously joint property. With children in a divorce, it is typical for the male child to remain with the father and the female child with the mother.

== Violence against women ==
Sexual assault within communities, as well as rape by the Burmese military as a weapon of war and genocide all have been reported by Burmese women. Additionally, trafficking of women, especially in the border regions of Myanmar, as well as domestic violence and forced sex in marriage, are ongoing problems. Within individual families, women express concern about the limited role opportunities besides that of servants and child-care providers. Despite legal frameworks, women hold limited decision-making power within the family.

== Ethnic women’s rights ==
There is great diversity among the 135 government-recognized ethnic groups in Myanmar, and therefore generalizations may not apply to every group. However, there is a consistent trend of abuses suffered by the majority of ethnic women. There are few opportunities for paid labor in rural areas, especially with the common occurrence of displacement that causes people to constantly be moving. As a result, women farmers must meet the needs of their families in addition to the demands of the Burmese army for rations, taxes, and labor.

This burden of farmwork and housework causes a severe toll on the health of these women. Moreover, the lack of access to healthcare, widespread malnutrition, and endemic diseases have resulted in high maternal mortality rates in the rural areas, causing an estimated 580 deaths per 100,000 women. In rural areas, most women do not have access to contraception or other means to control their fertility, resulting in the majority of ethnic women giving birth ten or more times, although often only half of their children live to adulthood.

A 1998 International Labour Organization (ILO) Commission of Inquiry reported that forced labor is most commonly seen in ethnic minority areas. In these areas, forced labor is used as a means of enforcing the army’s control over local populations. Women are usually the first in the family to engage in unpaid labor in an attempt to allow male family members to seek wage-generating employment. Widows, however, are especially vulnerable to forced labor as they are usually unable to pay fees that would exempt them from forced labor.

Ethnic women most commonly reside in Myanmar's border areas that are most prone to civil wars and conflict. This results in women being systematically targeted by soldiers for violence, particularly rape, based on their ethnicity. Consistent accounts report physical and psychological abuse of ethnic women by government soldiers. This violence occurs in the form of beatings, torture, summary executions, rape and other forms of sexual violence. Additionally, coerced marriages between ethnic women and soldiers are common in attempting to promote the government’s “Burmanization” program. Reports indicate that taking an ethnic bride may result in the promotion of the soldier in the armed forces.

Not all Burmese men and women have been able to vote in elections. In 2015, 1,000,000 citizens were denied the right to vote officially based on security reasons, half of those barred from voting in the election were Muslims, largely Rohingya Muslims, and the other half were voters from other predominantly ethnic minority areas.

The Rohingya people, an ethnic minority in Myanmar, have been specifically targeted by gender-based violence and sexual violence as mechanisms of genocide. Rohingya people have been targeted by Myanmar’s military government for decades through erasure, mass killings, and forced migrations. Rohingya women in Myanmar experience constant danger of violence, and report being fearful of impregnation, as abortion is illegal and pregnant victims are met with stigma.

== Ranking ==
The 2013 Gender Inequality Index ranked Myanmar 83rd of 187 countries in regard to continuing gender inequalities. The 2023 Gender Inequality Index ranks Myanmar 150th out of 167 countries, and identifies that only 15% of parliamentary seats are held by women. The ranking takes into account the Myanmar labour market, reproductive health, and empowerment of women. The 2012 Social Institutions and Gender Index place the country at 44th of 86 countries and 8th out of the nine countries in East Asia and the Pacific.

== Myanmar's Institutional frameworks for Gender Equality ==
Myanmar has multiple institutional mechanisms currently in place that serve to implement the country’s commitment to gender equality and women’s empowerment. These include the Ministry of Social Welfare, Relief and Resettlement, and the Department of Social Welfare. They serve as Burmese government’s main channels towards women’s rights.

=== Myanmar National Committee for Women’s Affairs ===
The Myanmar National Committee for Women’s Affairs was formed on July 3, 1996, as a result of the Beijing Conference on Women. It is chaired by the Minister of Social Welfare, Relief and Resettlement. It is an interministerial policy and decision-making mechanism that has determined eight main areas of concern for the advancement of women in Myanmar: education and training of women, women and health, violence against women, women and economy, the girl child, women and culture, women and environment and women and media. These eight areas are the focus of the committee.

=== Myanmar Women’s Affairs Federation ===
The Myanmar Women’s Affairs Federation was established in 2003 and is classified as a nongovernment organization. It works along with the National Committee for Women’s Affairs to implement and follow through on a gender equality and women’s empowerment agenda that is reflective of the CEDAW and the Beijing Platform for Action goals.

==== Myanmar Maternal and Child Welfare Association ====
Myanmar Maternal and Child Welfare Association, established in 1991, promotes the health and well-being of mothers and children with a main focus on remote villages with a lack of access to healthcare. Implemented to fulfill the requirement of the health needs in accordance with the social objective “to uplift the health, fitness and educational standards of the entire nation.”

==== Myanmar Women and Children Development Foundation ====
Myanmar Women and Children Development Foundation was founded on May 14, 2013. It strives to promote equal opportunities for women and children regarding their livelihoods development, education, health, emergencies and decision making. The Foundation’s vision is to “promote happy and peaceful lives in a secure socio-economic environment for all women and children in Myanmar”. The Foundation has the goal of being seen by the international community as a non-government organization carrying out nationwide development projects for women and children.

==== Myanmar Women Entrepreneurs’ Association ====
The Myanmar Women Entrepreneurs’ Association was established in 1995. It is a nongovernment, nonprofit, nonpartisan organization with women entrepreneurs, managers and educators as its members. The Association is a member of the Union of Myanmar Federation of Chambers of Commerce and Industry. It aims “to unite and bring into focus and world attention the role and capabilities of Myanmar women entrepreneurs.”

== See also ==
- Women in Myanmar
- Human rights in Myanmar
