= Global Leadership Awards =

Awards honouring women given by American organisation Vital Voices

The Vital Voices Global Leadership Awards are annual awards that honor international women leaders in the fields of human rights, economic empowerment, or political reform. They are given by the American organization Vital Voices Global Partnership.

== Description ==
The inaugural awards were given in 2002. The event takes place annually in early spring at the John F. Kennedy Center for the Performing Arts in Washington, D.C.

The 2009 program was named that year's "Most Inspirational Event" by Washington Life magazine.

Past presenters include Ben Affleck, Christiane Amanpour, Federal Deposit Insurance Corporation Chairman Sheila Bair, Candice Bergen, Wolf Blitzer, Laura Bush, United States Secretary of State and Vital Voices co-founder Hillary Clinton, Sally Field, Honorary Co-Chair Senator Kay Bailey Hutchison, Angelina Jolie, Avon CEO Andrea Jung, Angelique Kidjo, Nicholas Kristof, Lisa Ling, Time Inc. CEO Ann S. Moore, Suze Orman, Queen Rania of Jordan, Zain Verjee, board member Diane von Fürstenberg, Reese Witherspoon, Brian Williams, and many others.

== Awards ==
- Leadership in Public Life Award (formerly Political Participation Award)
- Human Rights Award
- Economic Empowerment Award (formerly Economic Opportunity Award)
- Fern Holland Award, named in honor of the young lawyer who was killed in Iraq while working to create centers for Iraqi women. The award is given to a woman who works for human rights and women's empowerment.
- Rising Voices Award, given to a young woman leader.
- Global Trailblazer
- 10,000 Women Entrepreneurial Achievement Award, part of a partnership between Vital Voices and Goldman Sachs as an initiative to provide women around the world with entrepreneurial education.

== Past recipients ==
=== 2002 ===
- Economic Opportunity Award: Dawn Marole, South Africa
- Human Rights Award: Oksana Horbunova, Ukraine
- Political Participation Award: Inez McCormack, Northern Ireland
- Special Recognition: The Women of Afghanistan (representative: Sadoozai Paneh)

=== 2003: "Voices of Hope in a Time of Global Challenge" ===
- Economic Opportunity Award: Arije Al-Amad, Jordan
- Human Rights Award: Saisuree Chutikul, Thailand
- Political Participation Award: Anabella de León, Guatemala
- Special Recognition: The Women of Israel and the Palestine Territories (representatives: Tamara Barnea and Middle East Nonviolence and Democracy (MEND))

=== 2004: "Changing the Face of Leadership" ===
- Economic Opportunity Award: Reyna McPeck, Venezuela
- Human Rights Award: Marina Pisklakova-Parker, Russia
- Political Participation Award: Amat al Aleem Ali Alsoswa, Yemen
- Fern Holland Award: Fatima Hassan Mohammed Al-Migdadi, Iraq
- Special Recognition: The Women of Haiti (representatives: Marie Lucie Bonhomme and Danielle St. Lot, Les Femmes en Démocratie)

=== 2005: "A Call to Action" ===
- Economic Opportunity Award: Jaya Arunachalam, India
- Human Rights Award: Mu Sochua, Cambodia
- Political Participation Award: Latifa Jbabdi, Morocco
- Fern Holland Award: The Women of Ukraine's Orange Revolution (representatives: Nataliya Dmytruk, Oksana Gorbunova, Kateryna Gorbunova, Oksana Yarosh, Yana Deringer, and Ludmila Merlian)

=== 2006 ===
- Economic Opportunity Award: Ngozi Okonjo-Iweala, Nigeria
- Human Rights Award: Rita Chaikin, Israel
- Fern Holland Award: Mukhtaran Mai, Pakistan
- Global Trailblazer: Ellen Johnson Sirleaf, Liberia
- Special Recognition: The Women of Kuwait (representatives: Lubna Al-Qazi, Lulwa Al-Qatami, Fatima Hussien Al-Essa, Noureya Al-Saddani, Lulwa Al-Mulla, Rola Dashti, and Ghada Al-Khalaf)

=== 2007: "Women Changing Our World" ===
- Economic Opportunity Award: Maria Pacheco, Guatemala
- Political Participation Award: Margaret Alva, India
- Fern Holland Award: Awut Deng Acuil, Sudan
- Global Trailblazer: Muhammad Yunus, Bangladesh
- Special Recognition: The Women of China (representatives: Gao Yaojie, Guo Jianmei, Xie Lihua, and Wang Xingjuan)

=== 2008 ===
- Human Rights Award: Khin Ohmar and Charm Tong, Burma
- Political Participation Award: Laura Alonso, Argentina
- Fern Holland Award: Mariane Pearl, France
- Global Trailblazer: Sheikha Lubna Al Qasimi, United Arab Emirates
- Rising Voices Award: Kakenya Ntaiya, Kenya

=== 2009: "Women Leading Change Across the World" ===
- Human Rights Award: Somaly Mam, Cambodia
- Fern Holland Award: Chouchou Namegabe Nabintu and Marceline Kongolo-Bice, Democratic Republic of Congo
- Global Trailblazer: Hillary Clinton, United States
- Rising Voices Award: Sadiqa Basiri Saleem, Afghanistan
- 10,000 Women Entrepreneurial Achievement Award: Temituokpe Esisi, Nigeria

=== 2010: "Impact Through Innovation: Women Inspiring Change" ===
- Economic Empowerment Award: Roshaneh Zafar, Pakistan
- Human Rights Award: Panmela Castro, Brazil
- Leadership in Public Life Award: Afnan Al Zayani, Bahrain
- Fern Holland Award: Rebecca Lolosoli, Kenya
- Global Trailblazer: Melinda French Gates, United States
- 10,000 Women Entrepreneurial Achievement Award: Andeisha Farid, Afghanistan

=== 2011 ===
- Human Rights Award: Sunitha Krishnan, India
- Fern Holland Award: Liron Peleg-Hadomi and Noha Khatieb, Israel
- 10,000 Women Entrepreneurial Achievement Award: Fatema Akbari, Afghanistan
- Global Trailblazer Award: Aung San Suu Kyi, Burma, named "Voice of the Decade."
- Leadership in Public Life Award: Kah Walla, Cameroon

=== 2012 ===
- Human Rights Award: Rosana Schaack, Liberia
- Leadership in Public Life Award: Ruth Zavaleta Salgado, Mexico
- Fern Holland Award: Samar Minallah Kahn, Pakistan
- Economic Empowerment Award: Adimaimalaga Tafuna’i, Samoa
- Global Trailblazer Award: Shatha Al-Harazi, Manal Alsharif, Salwa Bugaighis, Marianne Ibrahim and Amira Yahyaoui

=== 2013 ===
- Tep Vanny, Cambodia, Vital Voices Global Leadership Award
- Human Rights Award: Malika Saada Saar, USA
- Leadership in Public Life Award: Malalai Joya, Afghanistan
- Economic Empowerment Award: Buroz Ivanova, Bulgaria
- Fern Holland Award: Sally Shara Al-Dulaimi, Iraq
- Global Trailblazer Award: Hadeel Ibrahim, Sudan

=== 2014 ===
- Human Rights Award: Sally Shara Al-Dulaimi, Iraq
- Leadership in Public Life Award: Khadija Ismayilova, Azerbaijan
- Economic Empowerment Award: Sarita Bansal, India
- Fern Holland Award: Nighat Dad, Pakistan
- Global Trailblazer Award: Malala Yousafzai, Pakistan

=== 2022 ===
- Human Rights Award: Phumzile Van Damme, South Africa
- Leadership in Public Life Award: Women's Coalition Ukraine
- Global Trailblazer Award: The Women of Iran
- Economic Empowerment Award: Monica Simpson, USA

=== 2024 ===
- Human Rights Award: Cristina Palabay, Philippines
- Leadership in Public Life Award: Lesia Vasylenko, Ukraine
- Economic Empowerment Award: Keren Bejarano, Israel
- Fern Holland Award: Fatoumatta Bah, The Gambia
- Global Trailblazer Award: Narges Mohammadi, Iran
