= Women in Myanmar =

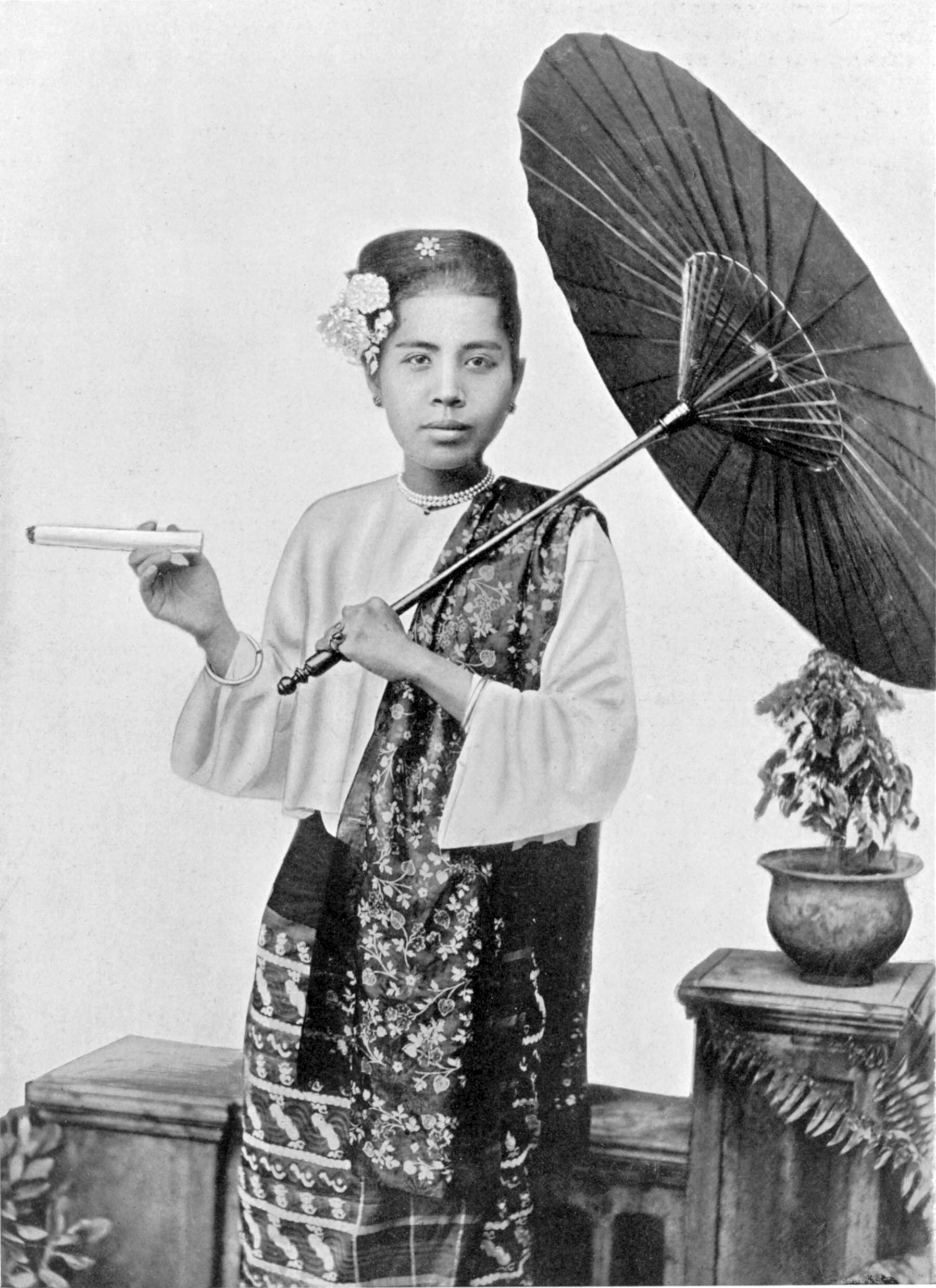
- A Burmese woman in traditional garb, c. 1920

General statistics
- Maternal mortality (per 100,000): 200 (2010)
- Women in parliament: 4.0% (2012)
- Women over 25 with secondary education: 18.0% (2010)
- Women in labour force: 75.0% (2011)

Gender Inequality Index
- Value: 0.498 (2021)
- Rank: 125th out of 191

Global Gender Gap Index
- Value: 0.677 (2022)
- Rank: 106th out of 146

Historically, women in Myanmar (also known as Burma) have had a unique social status and esteemed women in Burmese society. According to the research done by Mya Sein, Burmese women "for centuries – even before recorded history" owned a "high measure of independence" and had retained their "legal and economic rights" despite the influences of Buddhism. Burma once had a matriarchal system that includes the exclusive right to inherit oil wells and the right to inherit the position as village head. Burmese women were also appointed to high offices by Burmese kings, can become chieftainesses and queens.

In modern times, patriarchy dominates Burmese society. Political instability and stratocracy have caused violence and imprisonment to affect women disproportionately.

== Traditional dress & protest ==
The htamein (ထဘီ [tʰəmèɪɰ̃]) is one of the traditional dresses of Burmese women. This skirtcloth or lower body wrapper was worn by women during the Konbaung dynasty (1752–1855) as a wrap-around skirt, or sometimes as a folded clothing material placed "tightly across the abdomen slightly left center of the waist". In comparison, Burmese men wore the traditional lower garment known as the pahso (ပုဆိုး [pəsʰó]).

Superstitions have been tied to Myanmar women and their menstrual materials being directly linked to completely diminish the strength of their strength [spiritual energy] that troops had during battles. While in enemy territory, Myanmar women went against this superstition and were "threatened by tear gas and bullets" while actively placing used menstrual material in the protesting streets.

Pro-democracy activist and feminist Ying Lao has called out the pro-democracy movement in Myanmar for its exclusion of women and male dominance. She criticizes all-male pro-democracy panels, referring to them as "manels".

== Marriage ==
Marriages were previously allowed between Burmese women and male foreigners, provided that the divisional courts in Burma were informed within 21 days of advance notice. However, in May 2010, the government of Burma disallowed the conduct of marriage ceremonies between Burmese women and male foreigners. One of the suggested reasons was to avoid human trafficking. Burmese women became victims of human traffickers and were traded for the sex industry in Pakistan and Thailand.

To some extent, arranged marriages were also a part of Burmese tradition; however, the Burmese women have the right to refuse the offer of being betrothed to the parents' chosen partner for her. At present, young Burmese women can choose to marry someone for love.

== Women's rights ==
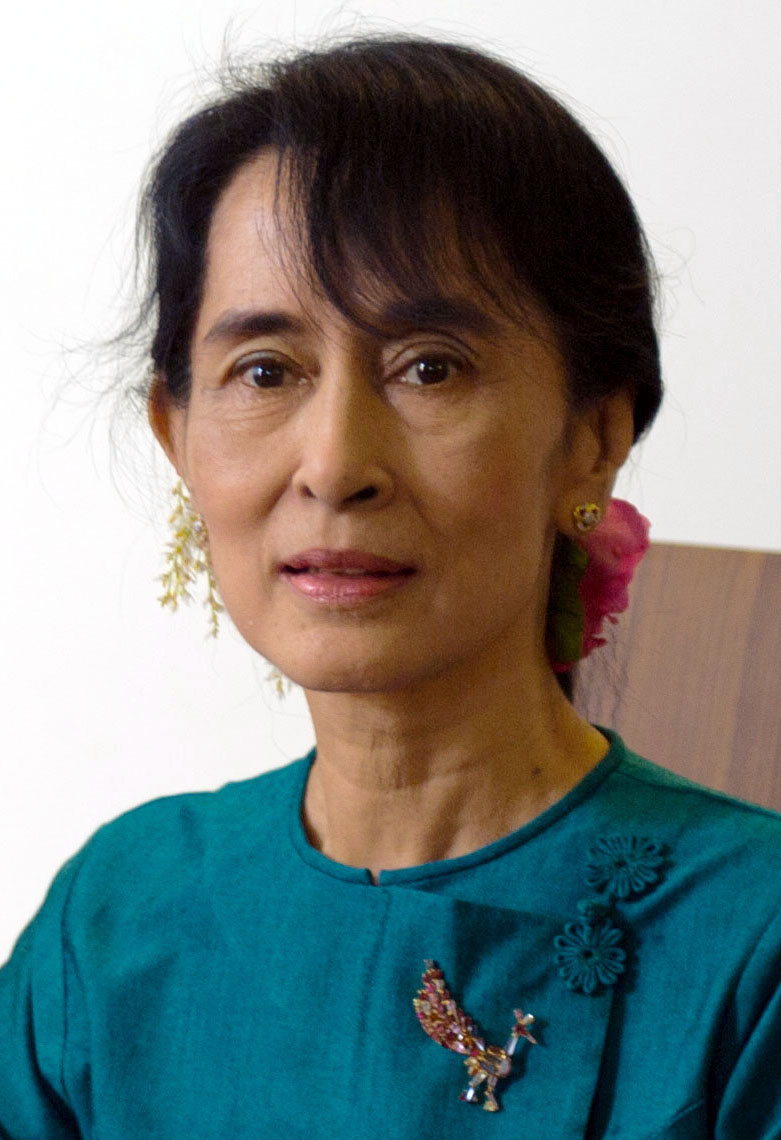
Pro-democracy activist and political prisoner Aung San Suu Kyi

In 2000, the Asian Women's Resource Exchange (AWORC) published a report entitled Human Rights in Burma from the Forum News (August 1998) describing that by tradition, Burmese women are maternal self-abnegators, meaning that these women "consistently forgo their own needs in order to give their children first priority." The report also indicated that rural and urban Burmese women were affected by the deteriorating economic climate in Burma.

As a result of British colonialism displacing the country, Burmese families were "increasingly prioritising the rights of men over women to limited resources." These changes affected the access of Burmese women to nutrition, medical services, vocational training, and other educational opportunities. Burmese women became unwilling porters and unpaid labourers for the military, including becoming victims of slavery, murder, torture, rape, and attacks.

Historically, urban Burmese women "enjoyed high levels of social power" but later became confronted with restrictions on speech and limitations in acquiring high-level positions in both private and public offices. According to AWORC, only a small number of Burmese women receive education related to reproductive rights and safe birth control practices, thus making them prone to being infected by HIV and AIDS. The women's rights movement in Burma started with the Burmese Women's Association in 1919.

In Wa State, the Wa Women's Association coordinates philanthropic activities, cares for orphans and promotes cultural heritage.

== Myanmar Armed Forces ==
In 2014, The Irrawaddy published a newsletter entitled For First Time in 50 Years, Burma's Military Welcomes Women Officers describing that Women Military Cadets existing from Burma's Defense Service Academy. The Commander-in-chief, Senior General Min Aung Hlaing, attended this ceremony with the conclusive thought that Burma governmental agencies hold "renewed vigor" because of the graduating class.

Gaining their independence from the British in 1948, women were allowed to join the military around this interval; however, limits were still placed on the positions they could equip and trainings they could participate in which had their own strict requirements also. Myanmar women were physically blockaded from joining "armed forces under the military regimes that controlled Burma from 1962 until 2011".

In 2025, under rule of the military junta, the UN identified significant evidence of “systematic commission of sexual and gender-based crimes” in Myanmar. A 2026 report published by the Assistance Association for Political Prisoners said women had been subjected to or witnessed physical torture and sexual abuse, including strip-searches and “sexual humiliation and coercion based on information gathered through CCTV cameras”.

== See also ==
- Claribel Irene Po
- Supayalat, last queen of Burma
- Women's League of Burma
- Myanmar Women's Affairs Federation
- Women's Auxiliary Service (Burma)
- Myanmar women's national football team
- Shan Women's Action Network
