= Khin Ohmar =

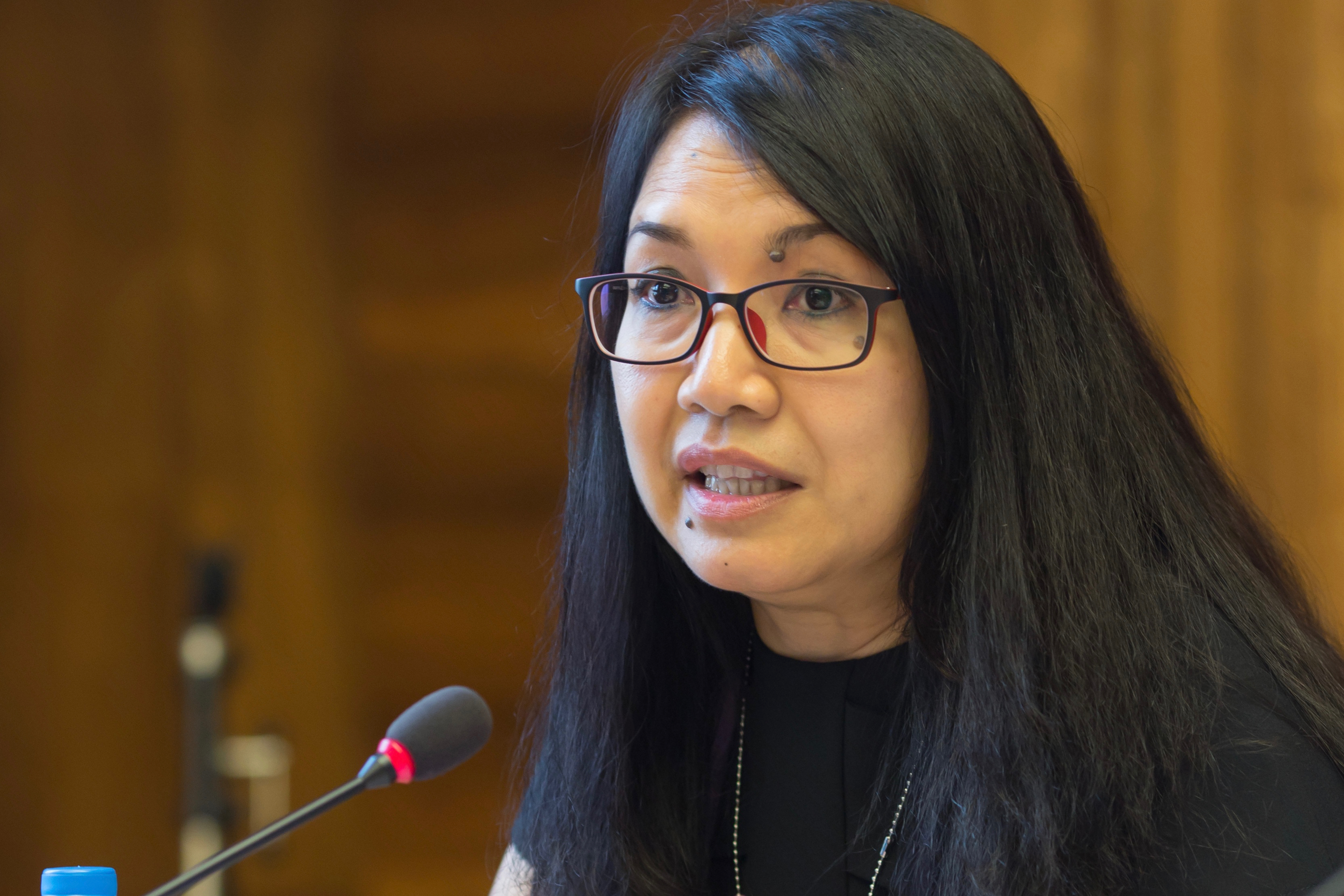
- Education: Rangoon Arts and Science University
- Occupation: Democracy activist
- Organization: Women's League of Burma
- Awards: Anna Lindh Prize (2008); Global Leadership Award (2008)

Khin Ohmar (Burmese: ခင်ဥမ္မာ, pronounced [kʰɪ̀ɰ̃ ʔòʊɰ̃mà]) is a Burmese democracy activist noted for her leadership in the 8888 Uprising and her work with the Women's League of Burma and the Burma Partnership.

Khin Ohmar was a senior student at Rangoon Arts and Science University studying chemistry when the events leading up to the 1988 anti-government protests began. She was twenty years old. On 5 September 1987, military ruler Ne Win announced the withdrawal of the newly replaced currency notes, Ks.100/-, Ks.75/-, Ks.35/- and Ks.25/-, leaving only Ks.45/- and Ks.90/- notes in circulation, apparently because only the latter two are numbers divisible by 9, considered lucky by Ne Win. Many Burmese people thus lost their savings overnight. Students, who often had savings for their tuition, were particularly affected. The next day, Khin Ohmar joined 20 other students in writing a letter to Ne Win protesting the move, which they forwarded through their university chancellor. The 21 signatories were arrested and held until Burma Union Day, 12 February 1988.

According to her 1995 testimony to a US Senate sub-committee, she then joined a 16 March student rally protesting the death of student activist Phone Maw, which was violently suppressed by riot police; she escaped when a Japanese diplomat gave her and other protesters shelter in his home. On 18 March, the universities were closed. She continued to help coordinate protests and international media coverage until the climactic rally of 8 August 1988, from which the "8888 Uprising" takes its name.

Following the further suppression of pro-democracy protests by the State Law and Order Restoration Council, Burma's military government, she traveled to the Thai-Burmese border to join the All Burma Students' Democratic Front (ABSDF), a revolutionary army. Political differences and alleged leadership failures in the ABSDF leadership eventually caused Khin Ohmar to leave the group, and she subsequently lived in the United States for at least five years.

As of August 2007, she was active in the Burmese Women's Union, the Women's League of Burma and the Network for Democracy and Development.

On October 25, 2009, she was "kicked out" of an Asean (Association of Southeast Asian Nations) summit on human rights, later charging that the organization was ineffective on Burmese human rights and "afraid to hear from civil society". In April 2011, she called on the first US Ambassador to Asean, David Lee Carden, to "[stand] firmly on democracy and human rights for Burma".

== Awards ==
In 2008, Khin Ohmar won the Anna Lindh Prize, named for assassinated Swedish politician Anna Lindh, which is awarded annually to a woman or young person with "the courage to fight indifference, prejudice, oppression and injustices in order to promote a good life for all people in an environment marked by respect for human rights." The award citation stated, "Her courageous and visionary work is a source of inspiration for all those engaged in the struggle for human rights and for a life of dignity. For the people of Burma, Khin Ohmar’s unerring faith provides hope and confidence that a just future is, in fact, possible." She also won the 2008 Vital Voices Global Leadership Award for Human Rights, which she shared with Shan Women Action Network activist Charm Tong. US First Lady Laura Bush, the award's presenter, described Khin Ohmar as "one of the strongest voices against Burma's violent regime".
