= Mended (disambiguation) =

Mended is a 2002 album by American Latin pop singer-songwriter Marc Anthony.

Mended may also refer to:

- Repaired
- "Mended" (song), song by Australian singer and songwriter Vera Blue

== See also ==
- Mend (disambiguation)
