= Charm Tong =

Shan teacher and human rights activist

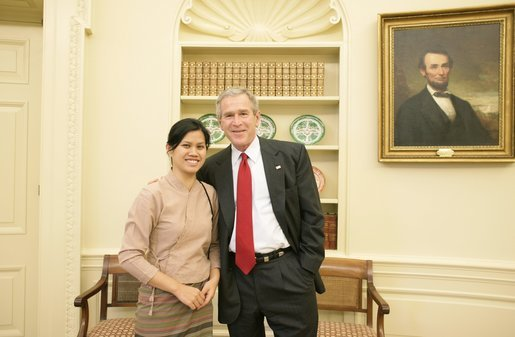
- Born: 1981 (age 44–45); Shan State, Burma
- Occupation: Teacher
- Organization: Shan Women's Action Network
- Known for: Human rights activism
- Awards: Student Peace Prize (2007); Global Leadership Award (2008)

Charm Tong (born in 1981, Shan State, Burma) is a Shan teacher and human rights activist. She is head of the School for Shan State Nationalities Youth in Northern Thailand. Charm Tong is also one of the founders of Shan Women's Action Network, which published the 2002 report License to Rape. For many years Charm helped refugees find school in Thailand.

== Background and work with Shan Women's Action Network ==
When Charm Tong was six years old, her family left Shan State to escape the ongoing fighting between Shan forces and the Tatmadaw (Burmese state military), part of Burma's ongoing internal conflicts. The family then took up residence in a refugee camp on the Thai-Burma border, enrolling her in a Catholic orphanage. She began her work as a human rights activist at the age of 16. The following year, she spoke before the United Nations Commission on Human Rights in Geneva about issues facing Shan women, particularly the use of systematic rape as a weapon of war. Tong also received Marie Claire Women of the Year Award and the Reebok Human Rights Award. She speaks different languages including English, Thai, Mandarin as well as her native Shan.

In 2002, the Shan Women's Action Network published its report License to Rape: The Burmese military regime's use of sexual violence in the ongoing war in Shan State, which attempted to document "173 incidents of rape and other forms of sexual violence, involving 625 girls and women, committed by Burmese army troops in Shan State." The report describes "systematic and widespread incidence of rape" and includes 28 detailed interviews with rape survivors. Its publication attracted global attention to the issue of sexual violence in Burma's internal conflicts. The Burmese military government, the State Peace and Development Council, denied the report's findings, stating that insurgents are responsible for violence in the region.

== International recognition ==
On 31 October 2005, Charm Tong visited the White House to discuss the Burmese political situation with US president George W. Bush, National Security Advisor Stephen J. Hadley and other senior US officials. "I am very happy ... to break the silence of what is happening to the people of Burma", she told reporters afterward. Congressman Tom Lantos, co-founder of the Congressional Human Rights Caucus, predicted that Charm Tong's 50 minutes with Bush "would reverberate around the world". The Irrawaddy wrote in December of that year that lobbyists were attributing Bush's subsequent "outspokenness on Burma" to "the Charm Tong Effect".

For her work in investigating and publicizing abuses against Shan women by the Burmese military, Charm Tong received the Marie Claire Women of the World Award in 2004 and The Reebok Human Rights Award in 2005. She also received the 2007 Student Peace Prize, which was awarded to her at the International Student Festival in Trondheim. In 2008, she was given a Vital Voices Global Leadership Award in the area of human rights, which she shared with Khin Ohmar of the Women's League of Burma. The award was presented by US First Lady Laura Bush. Charm Tong received some international awards including Marie Claire Women of the Year and the Reebok Human Rights Award.
