= Female graffiti artists =

Female participation in graffiti culture

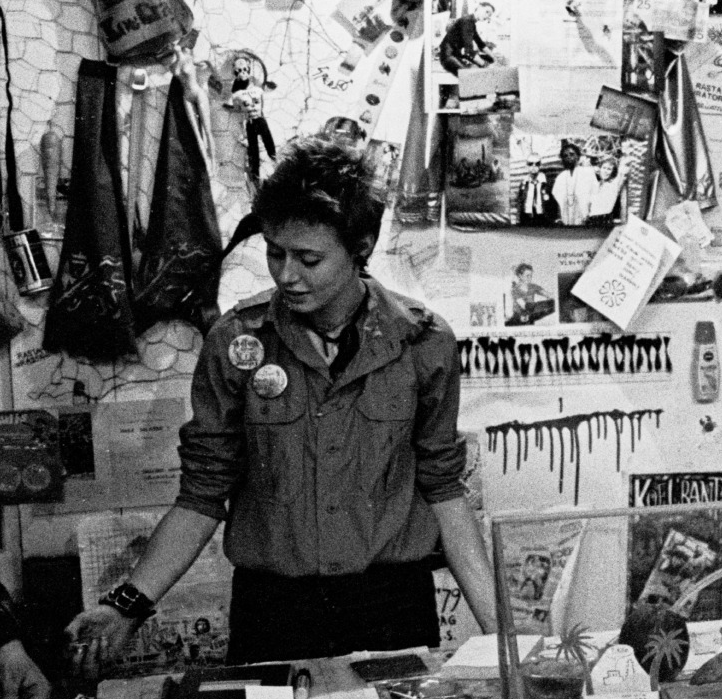
Portrait of the Dutch punk-graffiti artist Diana Ozon reading poetry in a squat on the Sarphatistraat, 1978

Female graffiti artists have played a significant role in the development of graffiti and street art, although the field has historically been considered male-dominated. Some researchers have even theorised that early cave wall art was primarily created by women, suggesting that women’s involvement in visual mark-making stretches back thousands of years. In the context of contemporary graffiti, early female practitioners in New York City included CHARMIN 65, Rocky 184, Eva 62, and Barbara 62, who were active during the late 1960s and early 1970s. Lady Pink emerged shortly afterwards, beginning to paint New York City subway trains as early as 1979.

Since the late 20th century, women graffiti artists have gained increased international recognition through exhibitions, publications, and media coverage. Notable practitioners include Claw Money, Swoon, MadC, Miss Van, Reminisce, and Margaret Kilgallen among others, who have played important roles in expanding the cultural and geographic scope of graffiti and street art.

== Themes and Impact ==
Women graffiti artists have influenced the evolution of graffiti and street art through distinctive themes, aesthetics, and social perspectives. While their work spans a broad range of styles and contexts, several recurring themes can be observed, including challenging gender norms, exploring personal and figurative expression, engaging in political and social commentary, and participating in community-focused activism. Female participation in graffiti has been documented since the early days of the New York subway era, with artists such as Lady Pink These early contributions laid the foundation for subsequent generations of women artists worldwide, who expanded graffiti’s aesthetic range and social reach.

=== Challenging Gender Norms ===
The graffiti subculture has historically been male-dominated, and many women artists have had to negotiate and challenge gender norms to establish their presence. Female writers such as Lady Pink have spoken openly about confronting sexism within graffiti culture and proving their abilities through persistence and skill. By claiming space in public and subcultural arenas, women graffiti artists have expanded the notion of who can participate in and shape graffiti culture.

=== Personal and Figurative Expression ===
While early graffiti was often focused on lettering, tagging, and stylistic competition, many women artists have expanded the visual language of graffiti to include figurative, narrative, and personal imagery. Miss Van pioneered a distinctive style featuring sensual, doll-like female figures, blending street art with fine art aesthetics. Similarly, Swoon is known for her large-scale wheatpastes and intricate cutouts, often depicting people and communities with a personal and emotional dimension.

=== Political and Social Commentary ===
Women graffiti artists have also used their work to address social and political issues, transforming public spaces into platforms for activism, cultural dialogue, and resistance. This work can be grouped into several overlapping themes:

==== Advocacy for Women’s Rights and Empowerment ====
Many artists highlight gender inequality and women's empowerment. Shamsia Hassani depicts veiled female figures in Afghan urban spaces, asserting women’s presence in public life and challenging restrictive social norms. Panmela Castro in Brazil uses murals and community projects to address gender violence and promote women’s rights, combining artistic practice with educational outreach. In the UK, the all female 'Wom Collective' advocates for 'inspiring and empowering each other and our communities'.

==== Political Resistance and Social Protest ====
Graffiti has long been a medium for political dissent. Egyptian artist Bahia Shehab gained recognition for her *“No”* stencil campaign during the Arab Spring, using Arabic calligraphy to protest political corruption, sexual harassment, and state violence. Shehab has continued her activism internationally, including a 2024 mural in Aberdeen, Scotland, which drew on Palestinian symbolism to encourage viewers to bear witness to human rights struggles.

==== Reclaiming Representation and Historical Narratives ====
Some women artists focus on highlighting overlooked voices and histories. Spanish stencil artist BTOY (Andrea Michaelsson) creates portraits of female political and historical figures, reclaiming their stories in the belief that women’s contributions have often been erased from mainstream narratives.

German artist MadC meanwhile uses her large-scale murals and public commentary to advocate for greater visibility of women artists. She has described painting in the streets as “essential” to her creative process. Emphasising the energy and immediacy of her mural work and its central role within her artistic identity. MadC also highlights how elements such as colour and placement influence how a work is perceived, deliberately combining power and femininity in the public realm.

Lady Pink is recognized as one of the pioneering women in New York graffiti, beginning her career in the late 1970s and early 1980s. She played a central role in establishing the visibility of women in the male-dominated subway graffiti scene and has inspired subsequent generations of female graffiti artists through her continued practice and advocacy.

==== Activism Outside of Traditional Wall Street Art and Graffiti ====
Other women have extended this socially engaged practice beyond traditional graffiti. British artist Carrie Reichardt uses mosaics, street installations, and interventions to address systemic injustice, environmental concerns, and community issues. Her work often blends craft, visual art and public space activism, demonstrating that street-based art can function as a form of social commentary even when it falls outside conventional graffiti.

British-Iranian artist Aida Wilde has also used street art and print-based installations as a means of engaging communities and prompting social dialogue. Emerging from the East London street art scene, she has been active in collaborative projects across Brick Lane and beyond. Wilde’s banners and text-based interventions often address themes of displacement, identity, and resilience. She uses public space to communicate collective experiences and to provoke reflection. Her work promotes community voices and lived histories, blending her own personal narrative with a broader social critique.

=== Community Engagement and Dialogue ===
Some women graffiti artists approach street art as a means of fostering dialogue and community engagement. Brazilian artist Mag Magrela emphasizes collaboration, obtaining permission for murals, and interacting directly with local communities. Her interdisciplinary work spans graffiti, murals, canvas painting, poetry, music collaborations, and performance art, reflecting a socially conscious and holistic approach. Similarly, South African artist Faith47 creates large-scale murals addressing social justice, human rights, and collective memory, often designing projects in collaboration with local communities to use public spaces as platforms for dialogue and empowerment.

American artist Claw Money runs educational workshops and community programs, teaching graffiti techniques to youth in New York City. Demonstrating how artists not only produce visually compelling work but also use their practice to mentor others and inspire community engagement. Collectively, these artists highlight the capacity of street art to function as both artistic expression and a tool for social connection and empowerment.

== Recognition and Impact ==
Women graffiti artists have increasingly gained visibility both within mainstream society and the broader graffiti subculture. In the early days of New York’s subway graffiti scene, pioneers such as Lady Pink challenged a male-dominated environment and established the credibility of women as serious graffiti writers, paving the way for future generations. Their participation demonstrated that women could achieve technical skill, creativity, and influence in a field often perceived as exclusively masculine.

Contemporary female artists have extended this impact globally. Figures such as Swoon, Hassani and Miss Van have exhibited in galleries and public art spaces internationally, gaining recognition not only for their aesthetic innovation but also for the social and political commentary embedded in their work. Within the graffiti world itself, women like MadC and BTOY have earned respect for their technical proficiency and for breaking gender barriers, challenging stereotypes, and influencing the culture of street art from within.

Recognition is also evident in socially engaged and community-focused projects. Artists such as Faith47, Mag Magrela, Claw Money, and Reichardt have been acknowledged for initiatives that combine street art with education, activism, and public dialogue. These initiatives have further reinforced the impact of women in graffiti and street art, highlighting an ability to influence both urban aesthetics and social discourse.

== See also ==
- Graffiti
- Street art
- List of street artists
- Feminist art
- Urban art
- Women in the arts
- Subway Art
