= Kah Walla =

Cameroonian politician (born 1965)

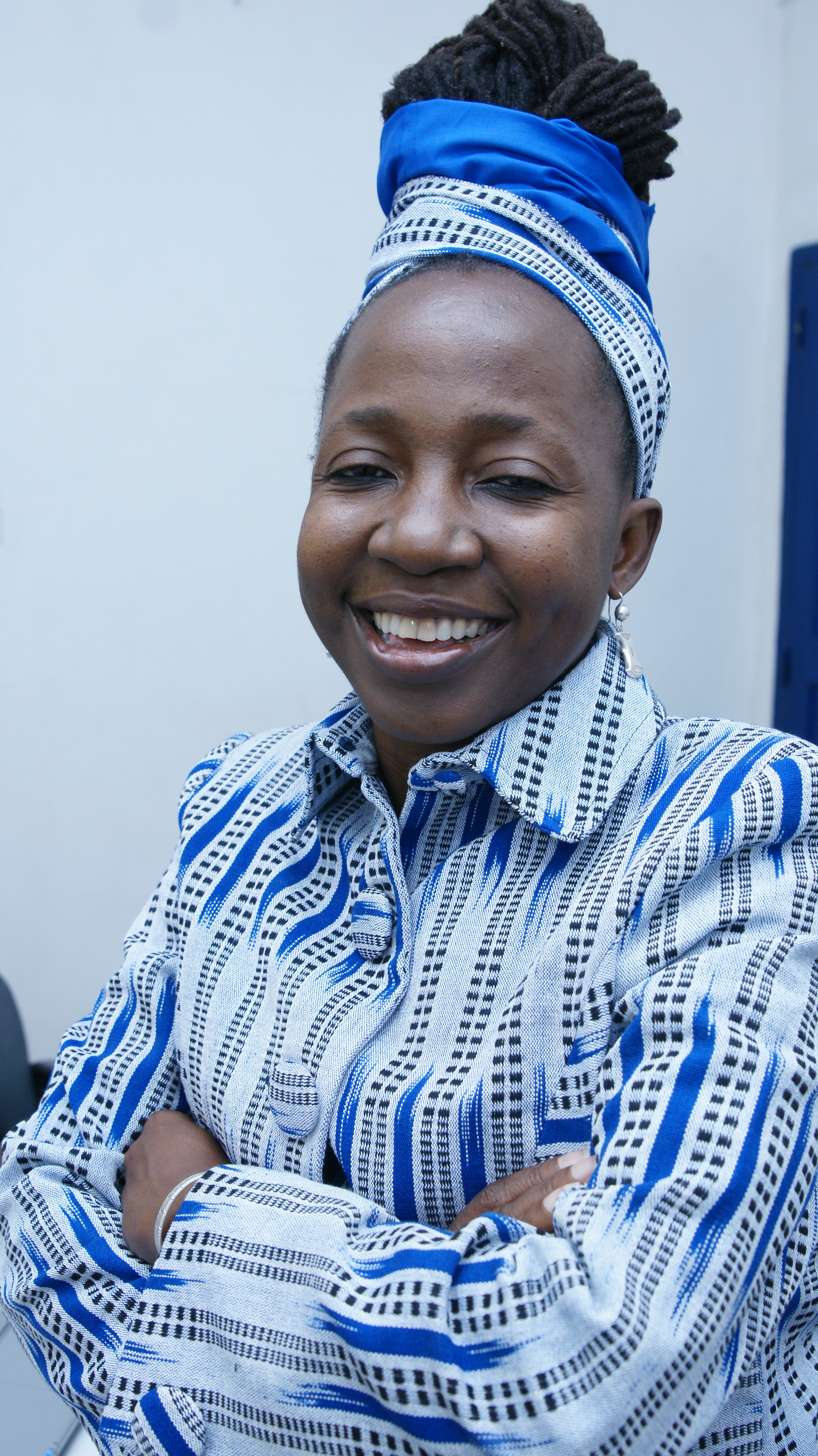
- Born: Edith Kahbang Walla; February 28, 1965 (age 61)
- Occupation: politician

Edith Kahbang Walla (born February 28, 1965), popularly known as Kah Walla, is a Cameroonian politician, entrepreneur and social activist. She went into politics in 2007 with the Social Democratic Front (SDF), the then main Cameroonian opposition party and was then elected into the municipal council of Douala I. In 2010, she resigned from SDF following a divergence over strategy and declared her intention to run for the 2011 presidential election on October 23, 2010. On April 30, 2011, she was elected as the president of the Cameroon People's Party (CPP) and party candidate for 2011 presidential election.

Kah Walla is the CEO of the firm STRATEGIES!, a leadership and management consulting firm which she founded in 1995. She was recognized in 2007 by the World Bank as one of the seven influential women entrepreneurs in Africa, and was counted among the 150 women who move the world by Newsweek.

== Family ==
Kah Walla was born on February 28, 1965, in Ibadan, Nigeria. She originates from the North west Region, one of the two anglophone regions of Cameroon, more precisely from Bali Nyonga from her father and from Pinyin from her mother. Her father, John Solomon Walla, before his death was Director of a consulting firm owned by John Ngu Foncha and Salomon Tandeng Muna, then Inspector General, Director of Shipping in Douala and finally representative of Cameroon at Ministerial Conference of West and Central African States on Maritime Transports in Abidjan. Her mother, Grace Ebako Walla, holds two doctorates: one in public health and one in health education; she led the NGOs CAMNAFAW (Cameroon National Association for Family Welfare). Kah Walla is single with seven adopted children.

== Education ==
Walla began her primary education in the American School of Yaounde. She continued her studies in the Ivory Coast Academy of Bouake in Ivory Coast. After graduation, she got admitted into Howard University in Washington where she obtained her B.Sc in zoology and studied for a Master of Business Administration in 1990.

== Political career ==
=== Entry into Politics ===
Walla says her family has always been a source of motivation and inspiration for her in the political field. She gained experience over the years with the support of one of her colleagues in the SDF as they wrote the last Speech for the SDF chairman Ni John Fru Ndi during his campaign in 1992. She was an adviser and a trainer to the party until 2007, when she decided to officially join the party and was elected councilor in the city of Douala. In 2010, she stood against party's decision forbidding its militants from taking part in the ongoing voters' registration. She was later accused of lack of accountability in the management of party funds, On October 23, 2010, she resigned from the SDF and announced her candidature for the 2011 presidential election

She was elected as the president of Cameroon People's Party on April 30, 2011, succeeding Samuel Tita Fon who founded the party in 1991.

=== Candidate in the 2011 presidential election ===
In 2010, Walla held a press conference to announce her decision to exit the SDF party and run for the 2011 presidential election. She separated from the SDF by resigning. And some time later, she joined the CPP and became president in April 2011. She explained later that the party for which she had campaigned for since its creation no longer shared the same ideals that, particularly with regard vision for the presidential election.

She is generally referred to as the first woman to ever run for the presidential election in Cameroon.

To attract the maximum possible of young people prior to presidential elections, she encouraged registration on the electoral lists in the country. The awareness campaign has enabled her to address more than 500,000 Cameroonians within a very short time.

She stood for the presidency along with 22 other candidates including Paul Biya, John Fru Ndi . She campaigned under the slogan "Kah Walla 2011 - The Time is Now". She was ranked 6th out of the 23 candidates, with 0.72% of the vote, at the end of the election which was won by incumbent President Paul Biya.

=== Anglophone Crisis ===
In March 2019, she aroused controversy and criticism among many Anglophone Cameroonians for remarks that she made during a panel discussion at the Elliott School of International Affairs at George Washington University. She was speaking at an event titled "Crisis in Cameroon." Sitting alongside the Institute for African Studies Director, Jennifer Cooke, and R. Maxwell Bone, and a student at the university who had spent time in the Anglophone regions of Cameroon. She made comments accusing the Anglophone Secessionists operating from diaspora of lies and hypocrisy. The remarks that she made elicited agreement from Jennifer Cooke and R. Maxwell Bone and subsequently went viral on social media. This led to criticisms of the fellow panelists of being biased and opposed to Anglophone Secession, and accusations that she wanted to become a minister in the current government of Paul Biya. She, along with the two other panelists said that the comments were taken out of context, and that she and Bone and Cooke alike were critical of the Cameroonian government during other portions of the panel.

Following the panel, both she and R. Maxwell Bone were subjugated to death threats, and intimidation from individuals affiliated with the Ambazonian cause. This was particularly worrisome to R. Maxwell Bone who works extensively with NGOs in Anglophone Cameroon. Kah resides in Douala, so the threats were not deemed as an immediate danger to her. As of the summer of 2019, they continue to be the subject of threats, misinformation, and intimidation. Claims have been made that this shows the true nature of Ambazonian secessionists, a claim that secessionists deny.

== Awards and Recognitions ==
- 2015 : Vital Voices Vanguard Award 2015
- 2014: DVF Award (Diane Von Furstenberg)
- 2011: Vital Voices Global Leadership Award in public Life
- 2010: Cited by Newsweek & Daily Beast as one of 150 women who shake the world
- 2007: Recognised by the World Bank as of one of the 7 women entrepreneurs working to improve the business environment in Africa
