= MEND =

Mend or MEND may refer to:

- to mend, or to repair
- Mend, Iran, a village
- 2-Succinyl-5-enolpyruvyl-6-hydroxy-3-cyclohexene-1-carboxylic-acid synthase, encoded by menD gene in E. coli
- Meet Each Need with Dignity, a Californian non-profit (food bank, support services for homeless etc.)

== Arts and entertainment ==
- Mend (album), by De Rosa, 2006
- The Mend (group), a British boy band
- The Mend (film), a 2014 American film
- "The Mend", a song by ZZ Ward from Dirty Shine, 2023

== Politics ==
- Muslim Engagement and Development, a British NGO
- Middle East Nonviolence and Democracy, a Palestinian NGO
- Movement for the Emancipation of the Niger Delta, a Nigerian militant group
