= Shan Women's Action Network =

- Abbreviation: SWAN
- Formation: 28 March 1999; 27 years ago
- Type: Women's organisation
- Affiliations: Women's League of Burma (WLB)
- Website: shanwomen.org/home

The Shan Women's Action Network (Burmese: ရှမ်းအမျိုးသမီးရေးရာ ဆက်သွယ်လှုပ်ရှားဆောင်ရွက်ရေးအသင်း: abbreviated SWAN) is an non-governmental organization of Shan women active in Shan State and Thailand, working to attain gender equality and achieve justice for Shan women in the struggle for social and political change in Burma.

Through its affiliation with local, regional and international women's organisations, SWAN establishes common platforms to promote the role of Myanmar's women in the struggle for democracy and human rights in the country.

Set up on 28 March 1999 by a group of Shan women seeking to address the practical and strategic needs of Shan women, SWAN established the informal networks already in place between the various Shan women's projects, therefore strengthening and supporting them. The network is also a founding member of the Women's League of Burma (WLB), an umbrella organisation comprising twelve women's groups from Burma.

== Objectives ==
The Network's main objectives are:

- To promote women's rights and the rights of children.
- To oppose exploitation of and violence against women and children.
- To work together for peace and freedom.
- To empower women for a better life.
- To raise awareness of the importance of preserving natural resources and the environment.

The Shan women's network would also be able to co-ordinate with other women's organisations from Burma, as well as GOs and NGOs working with women locally, nationally and internationally.

Currently the network is engaged in several programs designed to improve the situations of many Shan women, in areas such as education, health, women's empowerment, crisis support and income generation.

== Recognition ==
On 31 October 2005, SWAN activist Charm Tong visited the White House to discuss the Burmese political situation with US president George W. Bush, National Security Advisor Stephen J. Hadley and other senior US officials. "I am very happy ... to break the silence of what is happening to the people of Burma", she told reporters afterward. Congressman Tom Lantos, co-founder of the Congressional Human Rights Caucus, predicted that Charm Tong's 50 minutes with Bush "would reverberate around the world". The Irrawaddy wrote in December of that year that lobbyists were attributing Bush's subsequent "outspokenness on Burma" to "the Charm Tong Effect".

For her work with SWAN in investigating and publicising abuses against Shan women by the Burmese military, Charm Tong received the Marie Claire Women of the World Award in 2004 and The Reebok Human Rights Award in 2005. She also received the 2007 Student Peace Prize, which was awarded to her at the International Student Festival in Trondheim. In 2008, she was given a Vital Voices Global Leadership Award in the area of human rights, which was presented to her by Laura Bush.

== Publications ==
- Dispelling the Myths
- A Mockery of Justice
- Licence to Rape
- Human Rights in Practice: A Guide to Assist Trafficked Women and Children
- Shan women at the hands of the Burmese military regime: A story of systematic rape
- Let the Salween flow
- Building gender equality on the Thai–Burma Border within Burma's exiled opposition movement

== See also ==
- Women's League of Chinland
- Human Rights in Burma
