= Hajer Sharief =

Libyan human rights activist (born 1994)

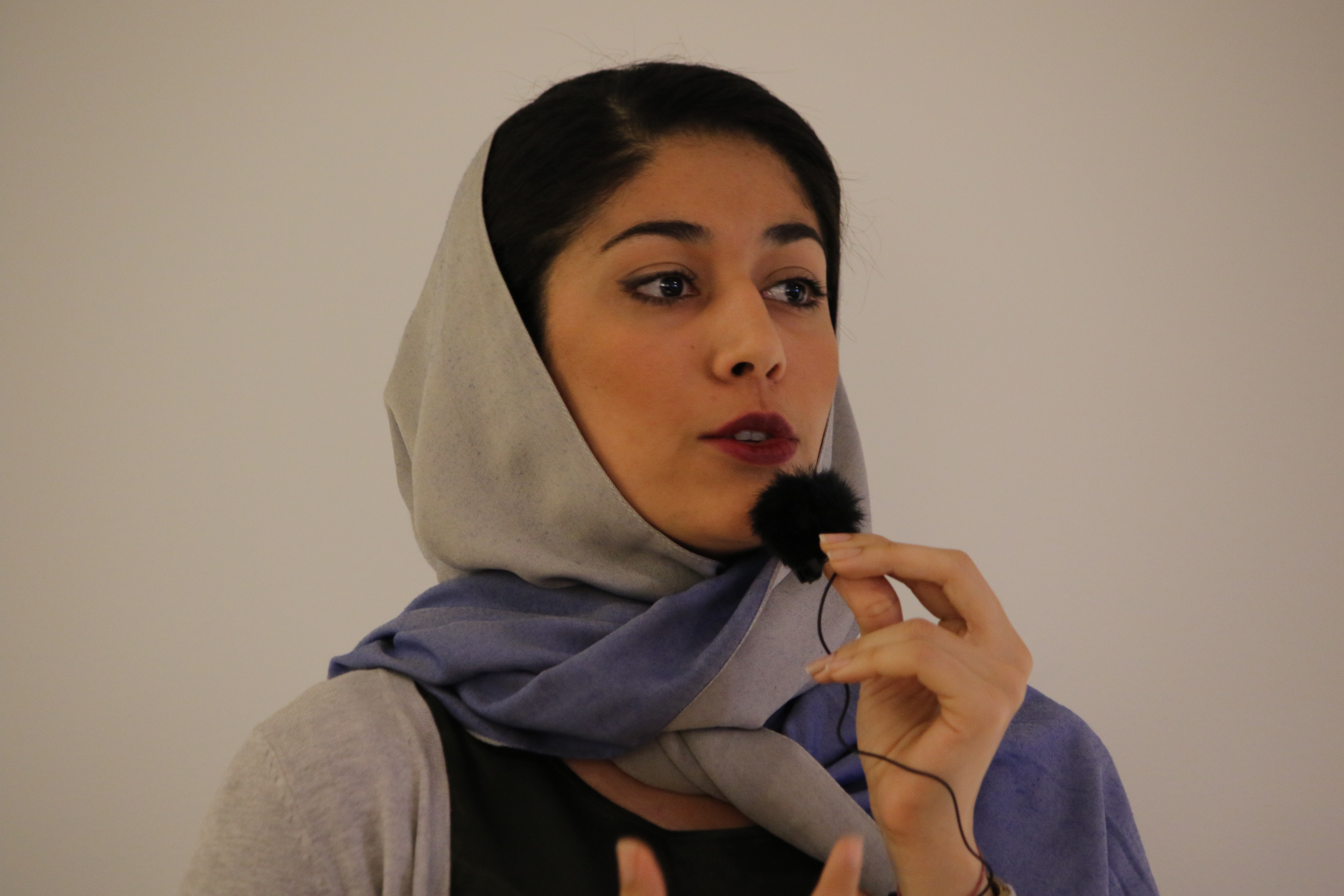
- Sharief in 2017
- Born: 1994 (age 31–32)
- Citizenship: Libya
- Occupation: Peace activist
- Organization: Together We Build It
- Awards: Student Peace Award, 2017
- Website: https://togetherwebuildit.org/

Hajer Sharief (Arabic: هاجر الشريف Hajer al-Sharief; born 1994) is a Libyan peace and human rights activist. She co-leads the work of the Together We Build It (TWBI) organization in Libya. In 2011, and at the age of 19, Sharief co-founded TWBI to build peace in Libya and promote human rights. She is one of UN Women's 12 Champions on Women, Peace and Security, and Human Rights; and a member of the Extremely Together young leaders initiative, begun by Kofi Annan and the Kofi Annan Foundation. In 2020, Forbes named Sharief as one of "Africa's 50 Most Powerful Women", and she was listed by Avanec Media among their "100 Most Influential African Women" for 2020. A winner of the Student Peace Prize in 2017.

== Biography ==
Sharief was born in Libya in 1994. She is a graduate of Tripoli Law School. In 2011, as a response to the violence of the Libyan civil war, Sharief founded the organization 'Together We Build It'. The organisation aims to support a peaceful transition for Libya, building on intergenerational understanding. Alongside co-leading the organization, she manages the various projects of the organisation on, including: human rights, women and youth peace and security, and international human rights law.

In 2013, Sharief established the 1325 Network in Libya. This network connects thirty cities across Libya in order to strengthen civic ties, as well as promoting the role of women in peace building and in society more widely. As a co-leader of the 1325 Network, she helped organize training, workshops, and other activities on how peace and security actions differ for women across Libya.

As a young peace activist, Sharief joined the United Network of Young Peacebuilders advocacy team to advocate the United Nations Security Council to adopt a Resolution recognizing the vital role of youth in peacebuilding and conflict resolution. Sharief was appointed by the Secretary General of the UN, Ban Ki-Moon, to work within a group of experts in order to further develop Resolution 2250, the first thematic resolution on youth, peace and security. She is also part of the network, 'Extremely Together', supported by the Kofi Annan Foundation, which is a program that brings together ten young innovators from around the world, whose mission is to find positive preventive measures against violent extremism among young people. Sharief was tasked with drafting a chapter on human rights and young people.

In 2017, Sharief was announced by UN Women as one of their 12 Champions on Women, Peace and Security and Human Rights. According to UN Women, the selected Champions "will advise UN Women on emerging issues for peace and security, and advocate for gender equality and women’s human rights in conflict-affected settings".

In 2018, Sharief briefed the UN Security Council during a session on Libya to become the first Libyan women to brief the Council during a country session on Libya. In her briefing, Hajer advised the UN Security Council and the UN mission to Libya on how they should ensure that women and young people are included in the UN's formal peace processes.

== Public engagement ==
As a peace activist, Sharief has delivered several keynote speeches on peace and security and human rights. In 2017, Sharief gave a speech titled "What do I do for a living? I'm a full-time war survivor", in this speech, she reflected on her experience as a witness to the 2011 war in Libya and encouraged people, especially young people, to play an active role in peacebuilding. In 2019, she delivered a peace talk at the Oxford Peace Talks titled "As a full-time war survivor. What is missing in conflict zones?". Sharief argued that peacebuilding in conflict areas wouldn't be successful without women and young people's full participation. In 2020, Sharief gave the keynote address of the Torino Peace Forum. Her address was titled "Intergenerational peace: the need to re-design the peace table."

Alongside her activism for peace and human rights, Sharief is an advocate for political rights and political participation. In 2019, she gave a Ted talk titled "How to use family dinners to teach politics" and in it she introduced the Family Democracy Meetings concept. This is a system her parents used when she was a child. She argued that parents should teach their children about political agency by giving them a say in how their households are run. Through the use of weekly meetings where everyone can express their opinions, compromise, and negotiate. In an interview with Forbes India, Sharief argued that "politics should be the lifestyle of every single person". In the same interview, she stated: "The political systems, especially with the recent wave of polarisation, seem to be focussed on putting one group or community against another. People are pushed into corners where they need to take sides. That’s where one must prioritise moral values."

== Awards ==
- In 2017, Sharief was awarded the Student Peace Prize.
- In 2020, Sharief was listed by Avanec Media amongst the 100 Most Influential African Women.
- In 2020, Sharief was named by Forbes as one of Africa's 50 most powerful women.

== Publications ==
- Intergenerational peace: the need to redesign the peace table.
- The international community alone won’t defeat violent extremism.
- Affecting power structures: Gender and youth perspectives.
