= Marina Pisklakova-Parker =

Russian women's rights activist

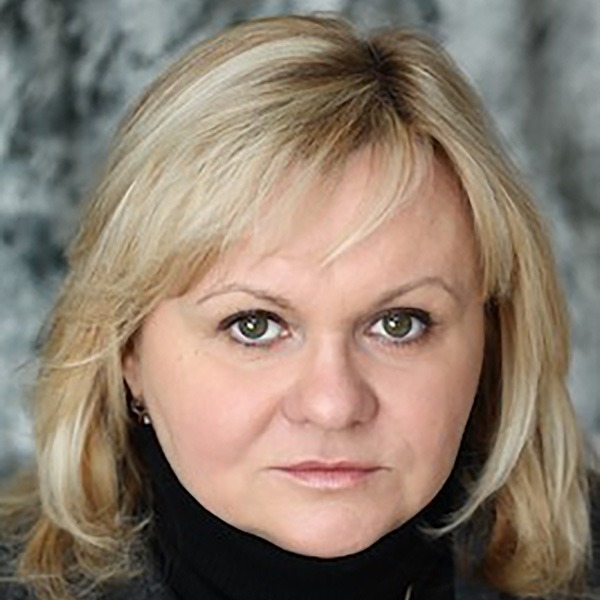
- Known for: Anti-domestic violence activism
- Awards: Global Leadership Award

Marina Pisklakova-Parker is a women's rights activist and author. She is the first person to establish a women's crisis line to help victims of domestic violence in Russia.

== Education and career ==
Pisklakova studied aeronautical engineering at Moscow Aviation Institute. She obtained a doctoral degree in Sociology from the Russian Presidential Academy of National Economy and Public Administration. While conducting research at the academy's Institute for Socio-Economic Studies of the Population, she came across a survey response from a woman describing maltreatment from her husband. Pisklakova was disturbed and called the center's director, who called it a case of domestic violence, which is a foreign term with no equivalent translation in Russian.

Not long after, while accompanying her child to school, Pisklakova ran into a mother with a bruised and swollen face. She inquired about it but the woman refused to answer. A few days later, the woman phoned Pisklakova and told her that his husband had struck her face with a shoe's heel for not stitching a button that had fallen off his suit quickly enough. Pisklakova asked the woman to leave her husband but she responded she had nowhere to go.

Pisklakova decided to call the police to report the case. The authorities responded that it was a private matter and they could not interfere. Pisklakova sought for agencies and found out there were no institutions that addressed victims of domestic violence in Russia. She took the matter to her hands and contacted the head of a women's crisis center in Sweden. The director guided and trained Pisklakova on how to establish the first women's crisis center in Russia.

== ANNA ==
In 1993, Pisklakova founded ANNA (National Center for the Prevention of Violence), a hotline for women to report domestic abuse and receive assistance. Pisklakova formed ANNA by herself, and was the only one overseeing the telephone. She faced oppositions, such as being accused of aggravating matters, as evident on her first case when the police advised the husband to beat his wife quietly.

Pisklakova received additional funding six months later. She hired psychologists and lawyers, and rented a space to provide a shelter for the victims. She eventually provided trainings for those interested in working as counselors and for those interested in establishing women's crisis centers. As the organization grew they began working with the police force providing training for different target groups.

In 1997, Pisklakova started a program to train lawyers in handling cases of domestic abuse. Pisklakova also lobbied for a legislation that recognizes the facets of domestic violence, such as through economic control, psychological violence and marital sexual violence.

ANNA coordinated a National Network and works with over 150 organizations to combat gender-based violence. Since December 2016, ANNA has been listed as a "Foreign Agent" as a result of their work to advance domestic violence legislation in Russia.

== Women's Rights Activist ==
In addition to her work on domestic violence, Pisklakova-Parker has worked to address the trafficking of Russian women and children. She is a Founding Member of the Vital Voices Global Advisory Council, which aims to conduct leadership, advocacy and anti-trafficking training programs for women throughout Russia.

Marina headed the Ministry of Labor and Social Development's Gender Equality Commission Working Group to draft anti-domestic violence legislation. She took part in the first Russian-American study of Russian marriages in which domestic violence was part of the survey. She was also part of a Russian-American team that co-authored the book, Marriages in Russia, and is the author of the books, Between Scream and Silence, and State of Fatherhood in Russia.

== Awards and recognition ==
Marina received the Georgetown Institute for Women, Peace and Security's 2021 Hillary Rodham Clinton Award. In 1997, Human Rights watch recognized her as one of the eight most significant human rights activists. She was honored again in 1998, with five other human rights defenders from different countries as the most significant activists of the decade .

In May 2004, Pisklakova was honored by Vital Voices Global Partnership for her work on human trafficking. In 2011, Newsweek Magazine named her one of 150 Women who shake the world. In 2013, Glamour magazine (Russia) named Pisklakova a woman of the year in the Best Social Project category. In 2020, The Moscow Times listed Pisklakova as among the women to watch in 2021. She was featured in Kerry Kennedy's Book, Speak Truth to Power.

== Selected works ==
- Marriages in Russia (1999) with Dana Vannoy, Natalia Rimashevskaya, Lisa Cubbins, Marina Malysheva, Elena Meshterkina
- Between Scream and Silence / Mezhdu molchaniem i krikom (2000)
- State of Fatherhood in Russia (2016)
