= Duško Kostić =

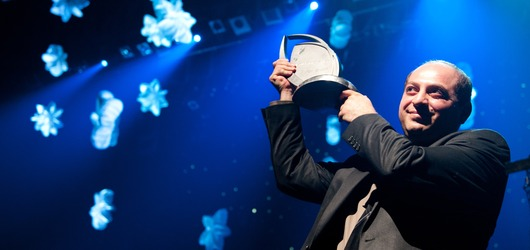
Dusko Kostic receives the Student Peace Prize of 2011, fotogjengen.samfundet.no

Duško Kostić is founder and president of the "Association of Roma Friendship", Luna. He comes from Beli Manastir in eastern Croatia, and studies at the University of Osijek. On 25 November 2010 it was announced that Duško Kostić will receive the Student Peace Prize for 2011, for his work concerning the Roma people’s rights. Through education and educational work he has sought to build bridges and understanding between Croatia's different ethnic groups. The Student Peace Prize is awarded on behalf of all students in Norway.

== Activities ==
Dusko finished his education at University of Osijek and then continued his efforts to improve the conditions of Roma people in Croatia.
