= Malika Saada Saar =

American human rights lawyer

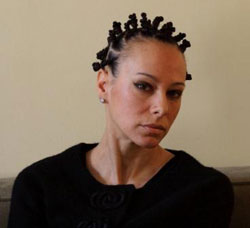
- Born: Pennsylvania, U.S.
- Education: Brown University (BA); Stanford University (M.Ed.); Georgetown University Law Center (JD)
- Occupation: Lawyer
- Employer: Google

Malika Saada Saar is an American human rights lawyer who is Google's Senior Counsel on Civil and Human Rights. She lives in Washington, D.C.

Saada Saar is the founder and Executive Director of Rights4Girls, a human rights organization focused on gender-based violence against young women and girls in the U.S. She also served as Special Counsel on Human Rights at The Raben Group and Executive Director of the Rebecca Project.

== Biography ==
She was raised in the Philadelphia (Pennsylvania) area. She attended Brown University, where she earned a Bachelor of Arts degree. Later Saada Saar earned a master's degree in education from Stanford University and a J.D. from Georgetown University Law Center.

Saada Saar co-founded the Rebecca Project with Imani Walker while at Georgetown. As Executive Director at Rebecca Project, she led a successful campaign persuading policymakers to pressure Craiglist to shutdown its adult services section, formerly a leading platform for child sex trafficking.

In 2010, Saada Saar was selected to serve on the Presidential Advisory Council on HIV/AIDS by the Obama Administration.

Her background is Northern African, Arab, European, and Jewish.
