= Student Peace Prize =

The Student Peace Prize
- Awarded for: Significant contribution to creating peace and promoting human rights.
- Country: Norway
- First award: 1999
- Website: http://www.studentpeaceprize.org/

The Student Peace Prize (SPP) is awarded biennially to a student or a student organization that has made a significant contribution to creating peace and promoting human rights. The Student Peace Prize was established in 1999 – as an initiative by volunteers from the International Student Festival in Trondheim (ISFiT). The prize is awarded on behalf of all Norwegian students, and is administrated by the Student Peace Prize Secretariat in Trondheim, which appoints a national nominations committee with representatives from universities and colleges in Norway, as well as an independent Peace Prize Committee that awards the prize. The award ceremony takes place during the International Student Festival in Trondheim (ISFiT).

The current leader of the Student Peace Prize is Martin Støldal Gjervan.

== Committee ==
As of 2010 the Peace Prize Committee has nine members, and is composed of four representatives from the National Union of Students in Norway (NSO), one representative from the Students’ and Academics’ International Assistance Fund (SAIH), and four non-student expert members.

The members of the 2011 committee was Ole Danbolt Mjøs, former chairman of the Nobel Peace Prize committee, Børge Brende, former Minister of Trade and Industry and current general-secretary of Red Cross Norway, district- and news editor in the Norwegian Broadcasting Corporation (NRK) Gro Holm, Vigdis Lian, head of the Norwegian UNESCO-commission, President of the National Union of Students in Norway (NSO) Anne Karine Nymoen and President of the Students' and Academics' International Assistance Fund (SAIH), Runar Myrnes Balto.

The committee of 2019 consisted of among others Red Party politician Bjørnar Moxnes, Torunn Tryggestad from International Peace Research Institute (PRIO), Gro Lindstad from FOKUS (Forum for Women and Development) and Sven Mollekleiv, former Honorary President of the Norwegian Red Cross.

Former committee members include former Prime Minister and director of The Oslo Center for Peace and Human Rights Kjell Magne Bondevik, NUPI-director Jan Egeland, former director of the International Peace Research Institute (PRIO) Stein Tønnesson and former Minister of Foreign Affairs and president of Red Cross Norway, Thorvald Stoltenberg.

== Nominations ==
The Nominations Committee accepts nominations from all interested parties. The nominees have to be either a student or a student organization. The Nominations Committee is composed of students from various Norwegian universities and colleges.

The committee gathers nominations and hands them over with additional information to the Peace Committee.

== Prize ==
As of 2009, the prize laureate receives 100 000 NOK (about €10000) and is invited to the award ceremony during the International Student Festival in Trondheim (ISFiT). The recipient or a chosen representative then makes a tour of Norwegian cities that gives an opportunity to meet humanitarian organizations and prominent politicians. The Prize money is awarded from an independent fund which is governed by Stiftelsen ISFiT in Trondheim.

== Laureates of the Student Peace Prize ==
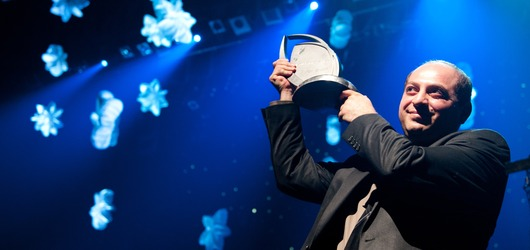
Duško Kostić receives the Student Peace Prize of 2011

- 1999 – ETSSC, a student organization in East Timor, and Antero Benedito da Silva
- 2001 – ABFSU, a student organization in Burma, and Min Ko Naing
- 2003 – ZINASU, a student organization in Zimbabwe
- 2005 – ACEU, a student organization in Colombia
- 2007 – Charm Tong from Burma
- 2009 – Elkouria Amidane from Western Sahara
- 2011 – Duško Kostić from Croatia
- 2013 – Majid Tavakoli from Iran
- 2015 – Ayat Al-Qurmezi from Bahrain
- 2017 – Hajer Sharief from Libya
- 2019 – Fasiha Hassan from South Africa
- 2021 – METU LGBT+ Solidarity from Middle East Technical University, Ankara, Turkey
- 2023 – DOXA Magazine from Russia
- 2025 – Iniciativa Puentes por los Estudiantes de Nicaragua (IPEN) from Costa Rica
