= Burmese Women's Association =

The Burmese Women's Association (BWA) was a Burmese women's organization, founded in 1919. It was the first women's organization in Burma, alongside the Young Women's Buddhist Association (YWBA) and the Wunthanu Konmaryi Athin (Patriotic Women's Association), which were founded the same year.

== History ==
The BWA, like the other women's organizations founded that year, was founded as an ancillary association of the anti-colonial independence group General Council of Burmese Associations (GCBA). Because it functioned as an associate of a male group engaged in the wunthanu independence struggle, it was accepted, despite the fact that political activity had been the exclusive domain of males in Myanmar until then.

It was an elite women's organisation with approximately 300 members, mostly prosperous women entrepreneurs, educated women and wives of officials. Initially the BWA simply followed the lead of the male independence group, and organized women in the struggle for independence. It participated in the campaigns and demonstrations organized by the independence group, such as the boycott of foreign import goods and the student strikes.

Eventually and in contrast to the other women's groups, the BWA became an autonomous association focused on feminist issues. It campaigned in favor of the Buddhist Marriage and Divorce Bill in 1927, until it was introduced in 1939, and ensured more equality. On 3 February 1927, Daw San and Daw Mya Sein lead a demonstration of one hundred women to the Rangoon Municipal Hall and Legislative Council in favor of women's right to vote and be elected.

Burmese Women's Association was the origin of several important later women's organizations. The tight association of Burmese Women's Association to the independence movement caused the organization National Council of Women in Burma to be founded in 1926, which in turn was seen as too distant from the independence question, causing Burmese National Council of Women to be founded in 1931.
