= American School of Yaounde =

International school in Cameroon

Coordinates: 3.864705°N 11.504362°E

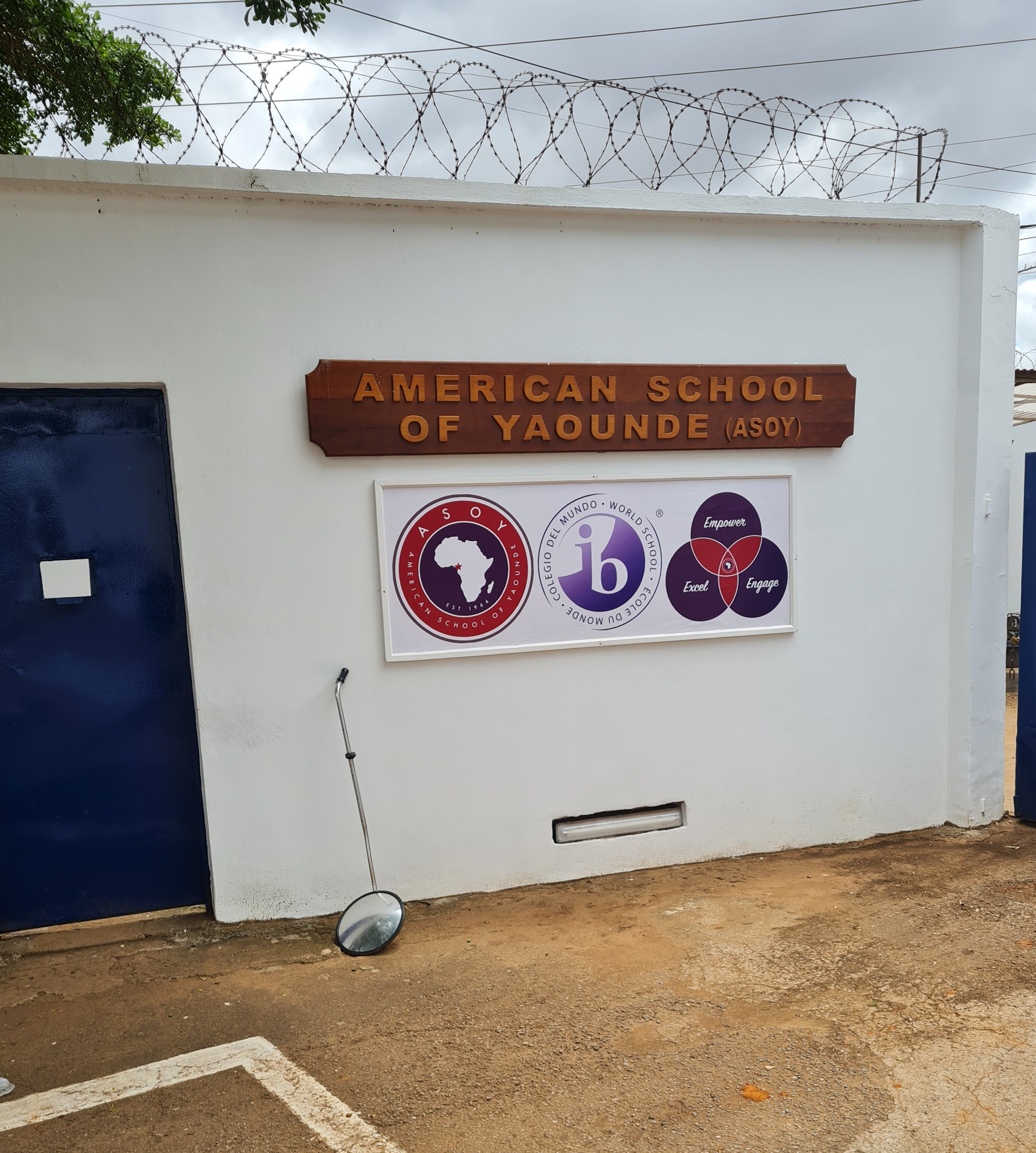

Location
- Yaoundé; Cameroon

Information
- Established: 1964; 61 years ago
- Language: English
- Website: https://www.aisoy.org/

The American International School of Yaounde (AISOY) in Quartier du Lac, Yaoundé, Cameroon, is an independent coeducational school founded in 1964, which offers an educational program from Pre-K 3 through grade 12 for students of all nationalities.

In the 2018–2019 school year, there are 37 full-time, 3 part-time faculty members and 2 interns including 18 U.S. citizens, 11 host-country nationals, and 8 third-country nationals. All staff members are fully certified and registered with their respective country’s educational department, with the majority trained and certified in the U.S. The school employs a full-time librarian and nurse.

== Organization ==
The school is governed by a seven-member board, six of whom are elected by the AISOY Parent Association, and a representative of the U.S. Ambassador. The board also includes a teacher representative and the school director who are non-voting members. Board meetings generally occur the third Thursday of every month and are open to parent observers. The Association meets in a General Assembly twice yearly, in September and April, for the purpose of electing board members and reviewing the annual budget and Strategic Plan.

AISOY is fully accredited by the Council of International Schools (CIS) and the Middle States Association of Colleges in the United States, the International Baccalaureate and is an active member of the Association of International Schools in Africa (AISA).

== Curriculum ==
The curriculum draws upon the U.S. and IB Diploma Program Common Core standards as well as the International Baccalaureate program. AISOY is currently a certified International Baccalaureate Diploma Program school, which refers to the 11-12 grades. All instruction is in English, with French being taught at all levels.

English as a Second Language (ESL) support is offered through Grade 10 to students who are not fluent in English. The school reserves the right to decline admission for students with learning issues, although it has moved towards being more inclusive.

== Facilities ==
The campus is located on a 3.5-acre site near the center of Yaoundé and consists of 25 classrooms, 1 computer lab, 2 science labs, a 16,000-volume multimedia library, a learning support center, a college counselor, the Parrot’s Canteen, a multi-purpose room, and a courtyard for events and R&R. Sports facilities include 2 tennis courts, one multi use outdoor court, a covered basketball court, a swimming pool, a kiddie pool, an artificial turf soccer field, and 2 playgrounds for younger students. The school consists of 4 sections: the early childhood (PK3-kindergarten), elementary school (grades 1-5), middle school (grades 6-8), and high school (grades 9-12).
