= Nataliya Dmytruk =

Interpreter who claimed that Ukrainian election was rigged

- Born: 1957 or 1958; Ukrainian SSR (present day Ukraine)
- Occupations: Journalist, sign language interpreter
- Children: A son and a daughter

Nataliya Dmytruk (Ukrainian: Наталія Дмитрук, alternate transliteration: Natalya Dmytruk) (born 1957 or 1958) is a former sign language interpreter on the Ukrainian state-run channel UT1 news broadcasts. Dmytruk became famous for refusing to translate the official script during a live broadcast on November 24, 2004 that announced Viktor Yanukovych as the winner of the presidential election. Instead of signing the official script, Dmytruk instead signed to viewers "Our president is Viktor Yushchenko. Do not trust the results of the central election committee. They are all lies." Dmytruk's act of defiance has been regarded as one of several catalysts for many Ukrainian journalists who subsequently rejected doctored news reports in favour of a more balanced reporting.

== Personal life ==
Dmytruk is the daughter of deaf parents and is the mother of two children, a son and daughter. Dmytruk both speaks and signs.

== Career ==
=== Act of courage ===
While working as a sign language interpreter at the Ukrainian state-run channel UT1, Dmytruk became known for a live news broadcast on November 24, 2004, when she refused to translate the official script that announced Viktor Yanukovych as the winner of the presidential election. Deviating from the official script followed by the voice announcer, Dmytruk instead signed to viewers, "I am addressing everybody who is deaf in Ukraine. Our president is Viktor Yushchenko. Do not trust the results of the central election committee. They are all lies.... And I am very ashamed to translate such lies to you. Maybe you will see me again."

Her solo rebellion sparked a stop-work meeting by 250 of her newsroom colleagues who made a broader stand for truth. Hundreds of her colleagues at UT-1 who were inspired by Dmytruk's action confronted the network's owners, chanting, "No more lies!" Within days UT1 had changed to a balanced reporting style. Following her act, many other news reporters in the broadcast media run or controlled by the state or the oligarchs who supported Yanukovych refused to participate in the production of the doctored news reports. Within a few days the overall political climate in Ukrainian media changed dramatically towards a more balanced coverage, while prior to these events the domination of the media is considered one of the ways Yanukovych influenced the vote.

"Without telling anyone, I just went in and did what my conscience told me to do." Hours after her UT1 co-workers announced on-air their intentions to report fairly, reporters at Channel 1+1 made a similar announcement. These changes were significant, because until then, most media outlets in Ukraine were influenced in some capacity by the government.

=== Aftermath ===
The widespread protests led to the Ukrainian Supreme Court declaring the election invalid. In the court-ordered new election a month later, on December 26, Yushchenko was declared the winner with 52% of the vote to 44% for Yanukovych. (See 2004 Ukrainian presidential election.)

Despite Dmytruk's efforts, changes spearheaded at UT1 by a new boss eliminated sign-language services, forcing Dmytruk onto extended leave. She later resigned and joined rival Channel 1+1.

== Awards ==
- Dmytruk was invited to the Freedom House Champions of Freedom gala in Bratislava, Slovak Republic on February 24, 2005 where Dmytruk and the other guests met privately with US President George W. Bush.
- In 2005, Nataliya Dmytruk, together with another Ukrainian Olena Prytula, were given the annual International John Aubuchon Freedom of the Press Award of the National Press Club.
- On April 25, 2005 Dmytruk and three other Ukrainian women (Oksana Horbunova, Oksana Yarosh and Lyudmila Merlyan) received the Fern Holland Award at the Vital Voices Global Partnership's fifth annual ceremony which honors women from around the world who have made a difference.

== See also ==
- Orange Revolution
