= International Student Festival in Trondheim =

Student festival in Norway

The International Student Festival in Trondheim
- Genre: Student festival
- Locations: Trondheim, Norway
- Years active: 1990-Present
- Website: http://www.isfit.org

ISFiT - The International Student Festival in Trondheim, Norway is allegedly the world's largest student festival with a thematic emphasis. Approximately 450 students from all over the world attend the festival. The themes change with each festival, but have always been related to social and political topics with international relevance. In 2027, ISFiT's theme is Changing Winds.

The stated purpose of ISFiT is to be a meeting place for discussion and debate, an arena where ideas are born, friendships are made and valuable lessons are learned. The festival aims at fostering inspiration and being a starting point for international cooperation amongst students. ISFiT is a non-profit festival.

The ISFiT participants take part in different workshops, which highlight the festival theme in various ways. Several lectures and thematic meetings are arranged, where well-known international speakers share their views with the participants and others.

ISFiT has been arranged in Trondheim, Norway every second year since 1990. More than 450 students work voluntarily in order to organize the festival. The president for the festival in 2027 is Jon Bergland.

== History ==
The idea of an international student festival in Trondheim came to life in 1988. The thought was to gather students from different parts of the world in a combination of a conference and a festival.

The theme of ISFiT 1990 was "A Changing Europe -- What are the Roles and Responsibilities of the Students and their Universities?," a timely theme, considering that the Berlin Wall fell shortly before the festival was held. Gro Harlem Brundtland opened the festival. ISFiT arranged for two trains, one from Budapest and one from Paris, to transport 375 students from all over Europe to Trondheim. For many of the participants, this was their first visit outside the Iron Curtain. This train ride has later been called "The ISFiT Rail".

In 1992, ISFiT had already established its name in the world. More than 4,300 applications were addressed to Trondheim from students all over the world. Norwegian Minister of Education and Research Gudmund Hernes opened the festival.

In 1994, the Dalai Lama visited ISFiT after he had received a visit from dedicated ISFiT representatives, who went to India and spent days outside his office until they got a 10-minute meeting with him. He was reported to have replied, "Cancel my other appointments. This is more important." 1994 was also the year that ISFiT started to offer financial support, so that participants from even more countries could come to the festival. The Dalai Lama visited the Festival for the second time in 2015.

The Dialogue Groups were first introduced in 1997. Since then, the Dialogue Groups have been a seminar where participants from different sides of a conflict get to meet at neutral ground to share their experiences and discuss possible solutions to the conflict.

In 1999 The Student Peace Prize was awarded for the first time. Since then, the prize has been given every second year on behalf of all Norwegian students. Antero Benedito da Silva from East Timor was the first laureate. He received the award for his non-violent battle against the Indonesian occupation.

Many world figures have attended ISFiT, and past speakers include former Director-General of WHO Dr Gro Harlem Brundtland and Nobel Peace Prize Laureates José Ramos-Horta, Wangari Maathai, Desmond Tutu, Betty Williams and Shirin Ebadi. Former US president Bill Clinton has participated via video conference.

Since 2003, the festival has had participants from more than a hundred countries.

=== Themes ===
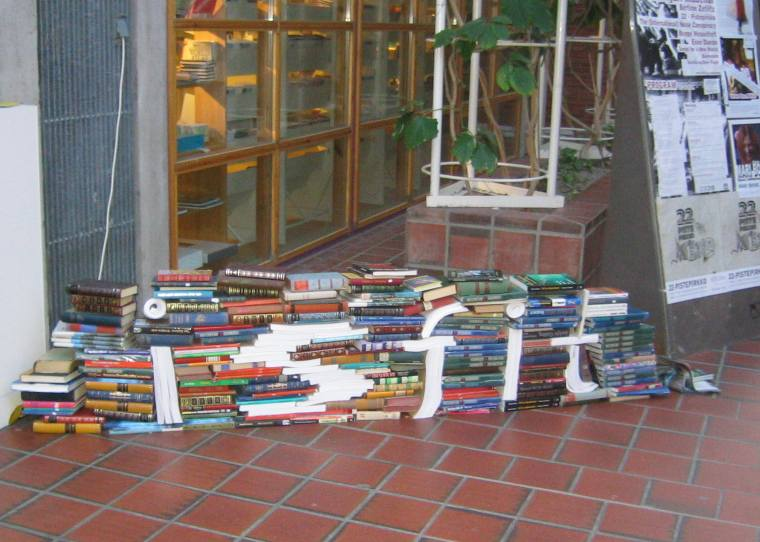
A book pile illustrating the theme of the festival of 2005, "Education, why?".

- 2027, Changing Winds
- 2025, Power
- 2023, Polarization
- 2021, Creating Knowledge
- 2019, Migration
- 2017, Discrimination
- 2015, Corruption
- 2013, Trade Your Ideas
- 2011, Globalize this: Health
- 2009, Peacebuilding
- 2007, Global Boundaries
- 2005, Education. Why?
- 2003, Challenging Attitudes
- 2001, Global Responsibility
- 1999, Solving Conflicts
- 1997, Quality of Life
- 1994, Human Rights
- 1992, Breaking Communication Barriers
- 1990, A Changing Europe - What are the Roles and Responsibilities of the Students and their Universities?

=== 2009 ===
Logo of the ISFiT Festival.

ISFiT 2009 was held from 20 February to 1 March in Trondheim, Norway. This was the 10th ISFiT-festival, the first was held in 1990. ISFiT is one of the world's largest student festival with a thematic focus. Approximately 450 students from all over the world attend the festival. More than 350 students in Trondheim work voluntarily for the student festival. Nobel Peace Prize Laureates Desmond Tutu, Dr. Shirin Ebadi and Betty Williams are some of the introductory speakers at the festival.

The theme for ISFiT 2009 was peacebuilding. The thematic focus was illuminated through both the workshops and the meetings during the festival in addition to the cultural programme. According to the theme document "ISFIT 2009 sees peacebuilding as a long-term process, with the object to create a stable and lasting peace, a peace that is something more than just an absence of war. Peacebuilding shall create a solid foundation for a peaceful development, as well as increase the society’s ability to cope with conflicts in a peaceful way. ISFIT 2009 recognizes peace building both as a preventative process as well as a process of rebuilding. Peacebuilding appears between different actors on global, regional, national, local and interpersonal level."

The Dialogue Groups 2009 kicked off 10 days before ISFiT 2009 with a seminar at Røros, and continued into the festival in Trondheim. In 2009 students from Israel/Palestine, Cyprus and Georgia/Abkhazia were invited to take part in the Dialogue Groups.

In addition to the workshops and the dialogue groups there were several lectures and thematic meetings, as well as concerts, exhibitions and performing arts.

Through the workshops all the participants of the festival will attend the different workshops. The workshops will highlight the festival themes in different ways. The workshops of ISFiT 2009 were:

- 01. Peace as concept
- 02. Arms Inc. & Tech.
- 03. Governing systems
- 04. International Trade
- 05. Health - The cure for conflicts
- 06. Children - the silent voices in society
- 07. Film & Photo - Shooting for Peace
- 08. Peace enforcement
- 09. Religion - Belief in Peace?
- 10. Sports - building a common ground?
- 11. Human rights
- 12. Demobilization, disarmament & reintegration
- 13. Wo:men
- 14. Development through migration
- 15. Energy & technology
- 16. Music - Jamming for peace
- 17. Student Peace Action Movement

=== 2011 ===
ISFiT 2011 is a student festival that was held from February 11 to February 20, 2011, in Trondheim, Norway. This was the 11th ISFiT-festival. 525 students from 104 countries gathered in Trondheim to discuss the festival's main theme, global health. The festival's name was Globalize this: Health.

ISFiT 2011 board defined global health as the health of the world population in an international context, looking beyond purely national perspectives and challenges. The concept covered all aspects of the human health – physical, mental, and social. Furthermore, the board defined health as an individual resource possessed by all people. By this, health is also a resource for local communities, nations and the world community. The global health affects and is affected by several international conditions – politics, security, economy and culture.

Kine Karlsen was voted President at a plenary session held at the Student Society in Trondheim in Trondheim on April 15, 2009. As president, she elected the following as members of the board:

- Jørgen W. Thorsen: Vice-president
- Eivind Berstad: Head of information
- Stina Låstad: Head of administration
- Elisa Osmundsen: Head of economy
- Eirik Vikum: Head of Student Peace Prize
- Elin Kathrine Saunes: Head of culture
- Karoline Fossland: Head of Theme

Kine Karlsen resigned as president in late October 2010, after a leave of absence since August 2010. Jørgen W. Thorsen was prototed to president in November 2010, after serving as Acting President since Karlsen's leave. Karlsen continued as a regular member of the board.

As in previous years, workshops formed the core of ISFiT. The workshops highlighted the festival themes in different ways. The workshops of ISFiT 2011 were:

- WS01 - Politics
- WS02 - Theatre
- WS03 - Education
- WS04 - Water
- WS05 - Mental health
- WS06 - Literature
- WS07 - Climate and environment
- WS08 - Economy
- WS09 - Food
- WS10 - Sex
- WS11 - Art
- WS12 - The future
- WS13 - Genes
- WS14 - Women and children
- WS15 - Information technology
- WS16 - Sports
- WS17 - Development and Aid

On 25 November 2010 it was announced that human rights activist Duško Kostić was awarded the Student Peace Prize. Kostić received the award at a ceremony at Olavshallen, 18 February 2011. He was also honored with a memory plate in Jomfrugata in Trondheim as a part of the Walk of Peace-project, that was unveiled during ISFiT 2011.

=== 2013 ===
ISfIT 2013 was a student festival held from February 7 to February 17, 2013, in Trondheim, Norway.

On April 6, 2011, a plenary session was held at the Student Society in Trondheim to elect the President for the upcoming festival in 2013. Several pre-announced candidates ran for president and presented what they believed should be the main of ISFiT 2013; among them were Guro Grytli Seim (Energy), Marianne Ytterbø (Technology) and Kaja Juul Skarbø (Trade).

Juul Skarbø and Grytli Seim were the remaining candidates after the preliminary rounds, and Juul Skarbø won in the end with 110 votes to 101, making Trade the main theme for ISFiT 2013. During the debate Juul Skarbø emphasized trade as a mean for social and economic development, but also as an obstacle for development. She pointed to power structures, sustainability, ethics and human trafficking as interesting approaches to the theme.

The theme for ISFiT 2013, Global Trade, covered many different areas of human activity. Juul Skarbø proposed topics as diverse as finance, economies of war, subsidies, human trafficking and local and global markets, for some of the workshops during the festival.

ISFiT 2013 defined trade as legal and illegal exchange of goods, services, labour, capital and financial instruments. By this definition, international trade encompasses issues that are both the reason for, and the consequences of, such exchanges. They discussed solutions to global trade issues in a long-term perspective. ISFiT 2013 also want to create a constructive debate and dialogue across ideological and national boundaries.

The theme was discussed in the workshops, at plenary sessions and under the event ISFiT open. They want to put a spotlight on issues like: Do students have the power to change a political regime? Who dominate the global market, and why? Is there a limit for what we can buy or sell? What is the reason for starvation when tons of food are thrown away in the western countries? Can consumption be a way to communicate and express our cultural identity and values? Is mixing business and social development the future?

As president, Juul Skarbø elected the following as members of the board:

- Yvonne Fadnes: Head of Administration
- Martin Gulseth: Head of Culture
- Victoria Nash: Head of Economy
- Elise Djupedal: Head of Theme
- Therese Høstad: Head of Student Peace Prize
- Christine Berntzen: Board Member
- Marte Helland: Organization Secretary

== Cultural Programme ==
Hanne Hukkelberg's concert in Nidarosdomen, February 22, 2007.

ISFiT is a combination of a festival and a conference, and has been offering a wide cultural program since the festival started in 1990. ISFiT is an international festival and a meeting place, and the cultural program is characterized by this. The cultural program creates an arena where the participants get the opportunity to break down cultural barriers. ISFiT offers both concerts, art and performing arts. There are also ceremonies held at the start and the end of the festival, as well as a ceremony for the Student Peace Prize.

A diversity of concerts is arranged during ISFiT, both at the Student Society and external scenes, like the Nidaros Cathedral.

ISFiT aims to be a place where "the leaders of today meet the leaders of tomorrow." During ISFiT, several plenary sessions are held. The plenary sessions aims to be a place to be inspired, a place to learn, a place to discuss global issues, and a place to be heard.

== Workshops ==
The workshops consist of smaller groups of 20-30 students from different countries. During the workshops, the participants collectively acquire knowledge of the workshop theme, as well as cultural differences and similarities, through a variety of methods. The workshops also have the opportunity to invite famous and knowledgeable people from all over the world to start and lead discussion and debate.

== Student Peace Prize ==
The Student Peace Prize is awarded biennially to a student or a student organization that has made a significant contribution to creating peace and promoting human rights. The prize is awarded on behalf of all Norwegian students, and is administered by the Student Peace Prize Secretariat in Trondheim, which is a part of the ISFiT-organization, and which appoints a national nominations committee with representatives from universities and colleges in Norway, as well as an independent Peace Prize Committee that awards the prize. The award ceremony takes place during ISFiT and is one of the main events of the festival.

== Dialogue Groups ==
The Dialogue Groups is an initiative to peace building in practice. The Dialogue Groups invite students from different sides of conflicts to meet on equal grounds for sharing of experiences and dialogue.

South Africa, Guatemala, Northern Ireland, Colombia, Kosovo, Rwanda, Kashmir, Israel, Palestine, Sri Lanka, Balkan and Russia/Chechnya, Ukraine, Iran/USA, Ethiopia/Eritrea, Sudan, the Great Lakes region (Rwanda, Burundi, Uganda and Congo), Azerbaijan/Armenia, Georgia/Abkhazia and Cyprus have been represented since 1997.

The Dialogue leaders and facilitators are students at Norwegian University of Science and Technology in Trondheim, who have theoretical and practical training in using dialogue as a tool for constructive communication and conflict resolution. External experts and professional mediators will also be used in parts of the seminar.

== Media gallery ==
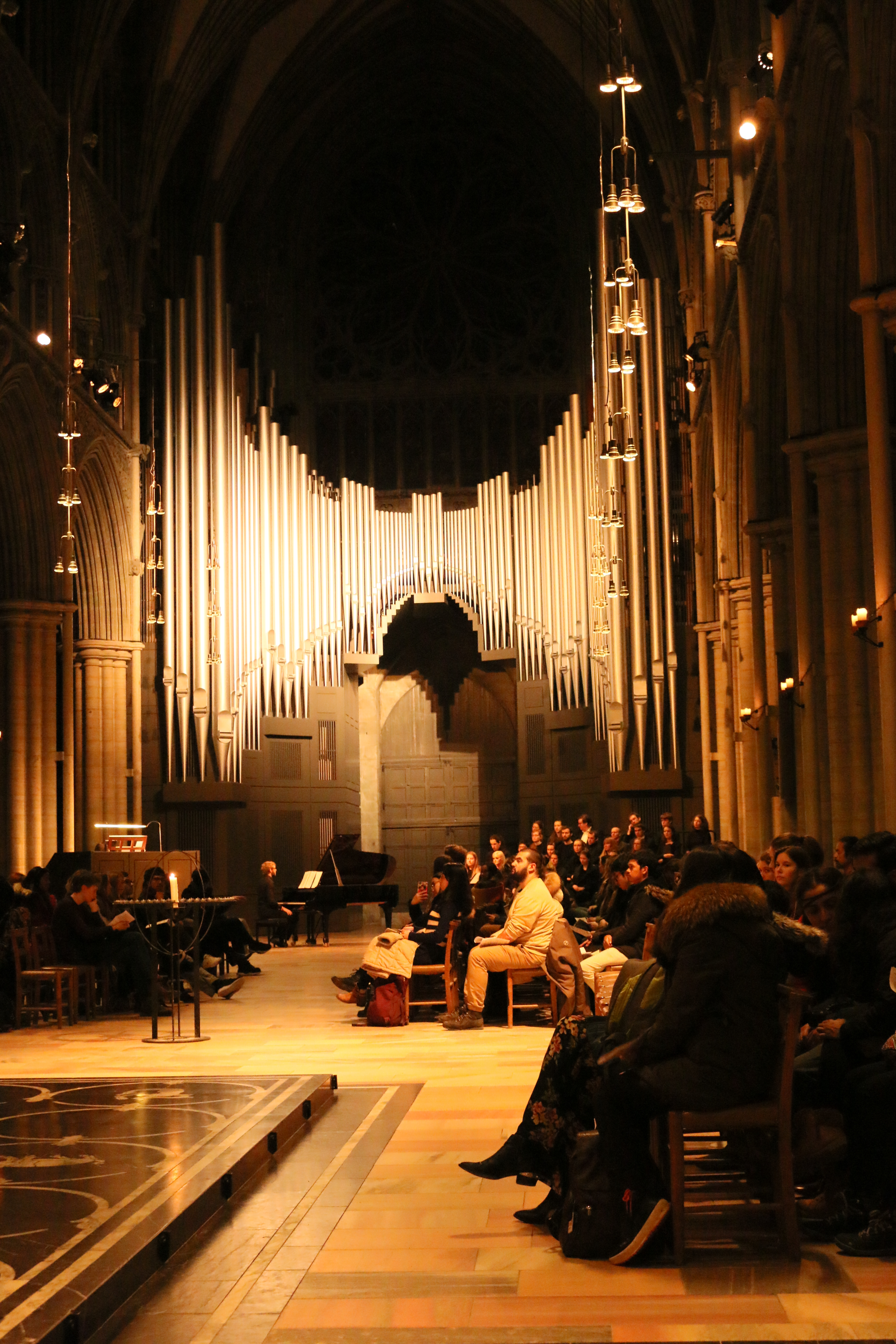
Prayer for peace at Nidaros Cathedral

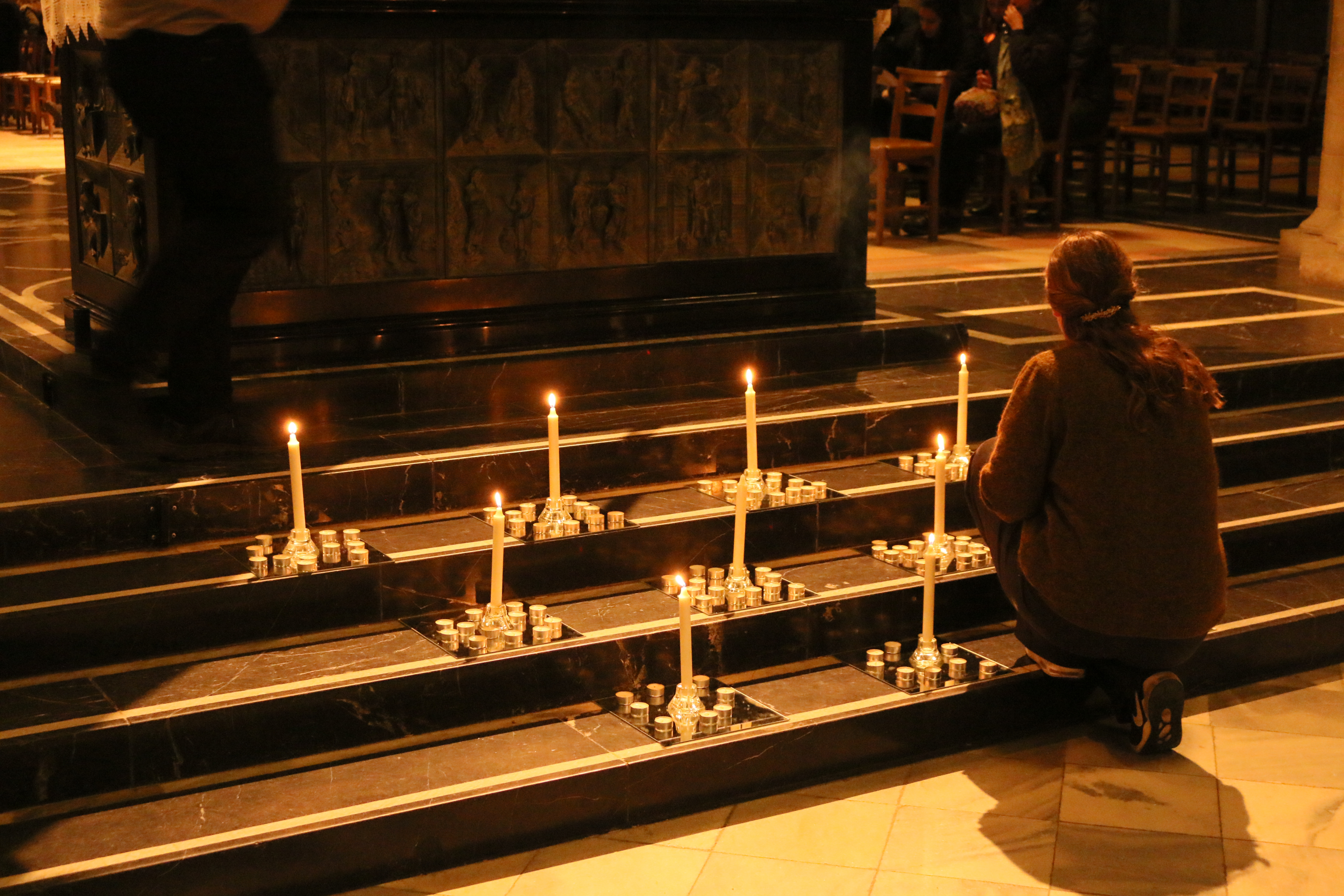

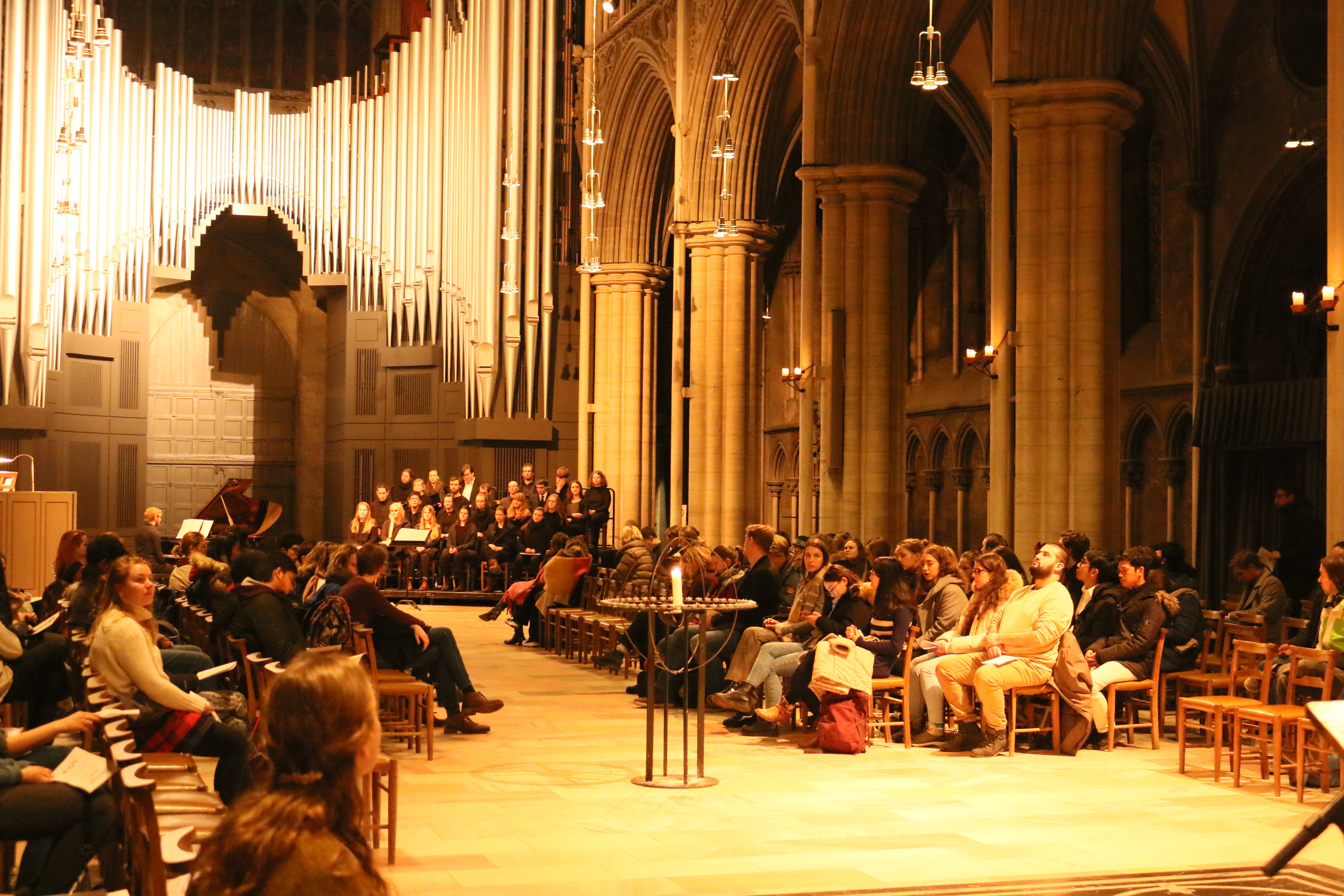
concert for peace at Nidaros Cathedral

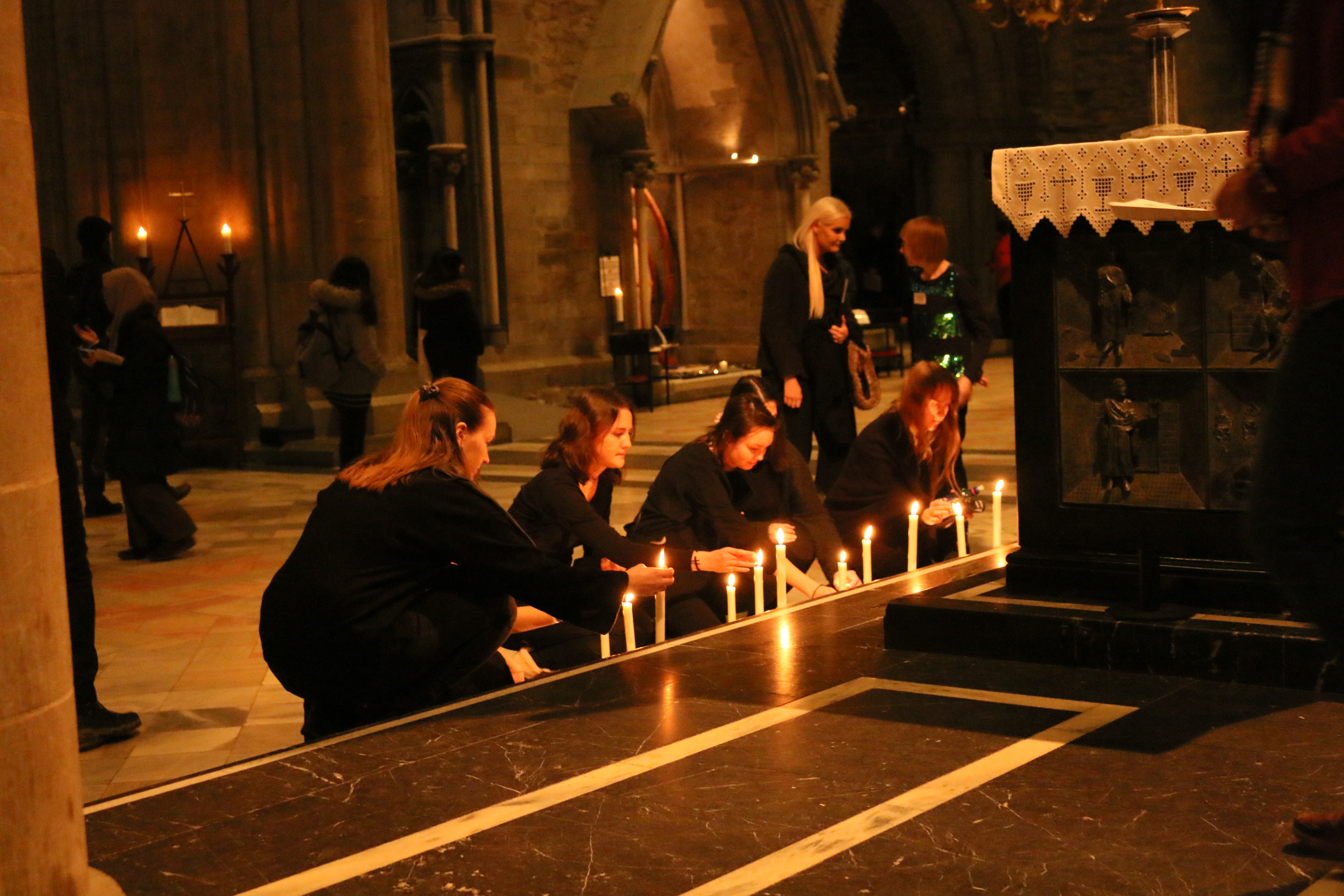
