= Panmela Castro =

Brazilian artist and activist

- Born: 26 June 1981 (age 44); Rio de Janeiro, Brazil
- Education: School of Fine Arts at the Federal University of Rio de Janeiro
- Known for: Painting, Performance Art, Graffiti, Human Rights

Panmela Castro (born 26 June 1981, Rio de Janeiro) is a Brazilian artist and activist. Her work explores themes related to personal experience and the body, focusing on the relationship between her own perspective and that of others. O Globo has described her as one of the most prominent figures in contemporary Brazilian art.

== Biography ==
Panmela Castro was born and raised in the neighborhood of Penha, Rio de Janeiro. She earned a Bachelor's degree in Painting from the School of Fine Arts of the Federal University of Rio de Janeiro and a Master's degree in Contemporary Artistic Processes from the Institute of Arts of the State University of Rio de Janeiro. Her work is influenced by themes of corporeality and her interactions with the urban environment.

Castro, who identifies as a mixed-race woman in Brazil, was raised as a white girl by her conservative lower-middle-class family in Penha, Rio de Janeiro. Her mother, Elizabeth, faced financial difficulties and instances of domestic violence with her first husband before leaving him and remarrying. Her stepfather provided a more stable environment and raised Castro as his daughter. However, when she was 15, her stepfather declared bankruptcy, prompting Castro to begin working to help support the household.

== First steps ==
In a challenging family environment, Castro left her parents' home and moved to Manguinhos, one of the city's most dangerous favelas. While living there, she drew portraits of people on the streets, charging one real per drawing.

During this period, she adopted the pseudonym Anarkia Boladona while participating in the carioca graffiti movement.

In 2005, Castro was subjected to assault and unlawful confinement. Following this experience, she shifted her work to murals, using her art to address and reflect on domestic violence. She came to view graffiti as a medium for social denunciation, a theme that continues to be present in her canvases and performances.

== Performance ==
Alongside her work in graffiti, Castro, using her civil name as her artistic identity, began creating works that engage with the street and challenge established norms of patriarchy, particularly regarding the female body, sexuality, and subjectivity, while exploring power relations.

Her first public performance took place on 7 July 2015 at the opening of Eva. In 2016, she presented two consecutive performances: Why? at the Museu Bispo do Rosário Arte Contemporânea, in which she wore a large pink dress and inscribed the word "Why?" across her chest with a razor, and Imitação da Rosa, in which she invited the public to move through The Republic Museum while wearing a Siamese dress.

== Paintings ==
After an extensive period working in graffiti and performance, Castro began revisiting memories from her childhood and youth in her paintings. Her work addresses personal and social issues, including daily life experiences, as explored in the series Purge; childhood memories, as depicted in Missing Home; and themes of neglect, acceptance, and structural racism, as presented in Women of Color Don't Receive Flowers.

== Cultural impact and accomplishments ==
In March 2010, Castro received the DVF Award in recognition of her efforts to advance women's rights.

In 2013, she was listed as one of the World Economic Forum's Young Global Leaders. She was also included in a list of 150 women recognized by Newsweek and The Daily Beast as having made a significant impact on the world.

Castro founded Rede Nami, an urban network in which female urban artists raise awareness of gender inequality through public art, graffiti, and workshops in Rio de Janeiro. The network provides workshops in Brazil for women and girls, addressing issues such as domestic violence while teaching graffiti art.

Castro continues to promote her mission internationally through lectures, exhibitions, and workshops at festivals, forums, and conferences, including events organized by the United Nations, the Organization of American States, the Rosa Luxemburg Foundation, Manifesto Festival, FASE, and Caramundo. She has produced murals and exhibited in multiple countries, receiving numerous awards and recognitions, including the Hutúz Award for Graffiti Artist of the Decade in 2009 and the Vital Voices Global Leadership Award in the human rights category. Past honorees of the Vital Voices award include Chilean President Michelle Bachelet, anti-trafficking activist Somaly Mam, Nobel laureate Muhammad Yunus, and U.S. Secretary of State Hillary Clinton.

In 2012, Castro was recognized by the Diller–von Furstenberg Family Foundation with the DVF Award, alongside figures such as Oprah Winfrey. She was included in Newsweek's list of 150 women making a global impact and, in 2017, was named by W Magazine as one of 18 emerging activists shaping social change.
