= Middle East Nonviolence and Democracy =

Non-governmental organization

Middle East Nonviolence and Democracy (MEND)
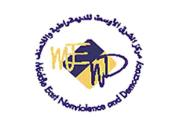
- Founded: 1998
- Type: Non-governmental organization
- Purpose: Nonviolence, Democracy
- Location: East Jerusalem
- Region served: West Bank, Gaza Strip
- Key people: Lucy Nusseibeh
- Website: http://www.mend-online.org

Middle East Nonviolence and Democracy (MEND) is an NGO which aspires to establish a non-violent Palestinian civil society. The organisation was founded 1998 and is active in the West Bank and Gaza Strip.

== Concept ==
With the concept of "Active Nonviolence" persuade the purpose to give the Palestinian civil society a perspective to solve their conflicts in the absence of violence. To launch this Nonviolence awareness MEND attempts an unconventional way of coming in contact with Palestinian Society. So they work specifically with youngsters and women who are often underprivileged in the Palestinian civil society.

== Projects ==
- Workshops – MEND gives training to interested Palestinian (MENDers) students in active Nonviolence. For this reason, MEND established a network of Active Nonviolence Centers over the West Bank and the Gaza Strip. The trainings are organized in regular intervals and last several weeks. After the training the MENDers have the opportunity to communicate their knowledge to their social environment.
- Sesame Street Project – on the basis of the internationally renowned television series Sesame Street, MEND created work materials that are specifically suited for children of preschool age. The aim was to overcome the lack of functional teaching materials for preschool children in the Palestinian community.
- Activist Talks – Because of the political situation, traveling between Palestinian territories is very difficult, time-consuming, and sometimes not at all possible. For this reason MEND activists are given the opportunity to exchange thoughts among themselves through video-conferencing.

== Spreading ==
MEND established since 2002 a network of Active Nonviolence Centers over the entire West Bank and the Gaza Strip. As of 2010 the following branches are active:

- East Jerusalem (headquarters)
- Hebron
- al-Eizariya
- Jenin
- Jericho
- Nablus
- Qalqilya
- Ramallah
- Tulkarm
- Gaza
