= Claribel Irene Po =

Burmese minister

Claribel Irene Po (1905 – 1994), also known as Ba Maung Chain, was the first female minister in the Union government of Myanmar.

== Life ==
On June 1, 1905, Po was born in Pathein into an elite Karen family. Her father was San C. Po, a physician and politician. Her mother was the daughter of a co-founder of the Karen National Association. Although Po wanted to study medicine, her poor health prevented her from doing so. She attained a degree in English Literature from Rangoon University and Judson College. From 1928 to 1935, she worked as a teacher. In 1935, she married an engineer. The married couple moved to Yangon and had two daughters.

During the Burmese civil war in 1949, she assisted in peace negotiations between the Anti-Fascist People's Freedom League government and Karen armed groups. In 1951, she became the first Chairperson of the Karen state. On March 16, 1952, she became the first female minister of the Union government, as the Karen state minister. She held this position until March 4, 1953. However, following her tenure, there were very few female ministers, particularly after the 1962 Burmese coup d'état, in which the military took over governance. As of 2019, she was one of only four female ministers in Myanmar since 1920.
