= List of villages in Wundwin Township =

Villages in Myanmar township

This is a list of villages in Wundwin Township, Meiktila District, Mandalay Region, Myanmar.

Village	Village code	Village tract	Coordinates (links to map & photo sources)	Notes
Aung Thar (North)	194525	Aung Thar		
Aung Thar (South)	194526	Aung Thar		
Byin Gyi	194560	Byin Gyi		
Kywe Tat	194561	Byin Gyi		
Ah Lel Kyun	194562	Byin Gyi		
Zee Phyu Kone	194563	Byin Gyi		
Zee Phyu Chan	194564	Byin Gyi		
Daing Kaung Kone	194581	Daing Kaung Kone		
Nyaung Pin Hla	194582	Daing Kaung Kone		
Dar Hla	194666	Dar Hla		
Thit Pa Lway Kan	194667	Dar Hla		
Myit Thu Nge	194668	Dar Hla		
Pauk Kan	194669	Dar Hla		
Gon	194591	Gon		
Gyan Lon	194696	Gyan Lon		
Hpa Lan Kan	194553	Hpa Lan Kan		
Hpa Lan Kyin	194661	Hpa Lan Kyin		
Mon Taw	194662	Hpa Lan Kyin		
Tha Hpan Pin	194663	Hpa Lan Kyin		
Hpa Yar Hpyu	194577	Hpa Yar Hpyu		
Kan Kwayt	194578	Hpa Yar Hpyu		
Ywar Shey	194579	Hpa Yar Hpyu		
Hpa Yar Su	194600	Hpa Yar Su		
Yone Taw	194601	Hpa Yar Su		
Kyauk Kone	194602	Hpa Yar Su		
Kan Thit (South)	194603	Hpa Yar Su		
Kan Thit (North)	194604	Hpa Yar Su		
Khway Thay Kone	194605	Hpa Yar Su		
Kyauk Kan	194606	Hpa Yar Su		
Htein Pin Inn (North)	194607	Hpa Yar Su		
Htein Pin Inn (South)	194608	Hpa Yar Su		
Hpo Kone	194679	Hpo Kone		
Yonepinkone	194680	Hpo Kone		
Nyaung Kar Yar	194681	Hpo Kone		
Min Kan	194682	Hpo Kone		
Chaing	194719	Htan Pin Kone		
Htan Pin Kone	194722	Htan Pin Kone		
Htee Hlaing (West)	194704	Htee Hlaing		
Htee Hlaing (East)	194705	Htee Hlaing		
Zee Kone	194706	Htee Hlaing		
Se	194707	Htee Hlaing		
Inn Kan Kone	194580	Inn Kan Kone		
Inn Khan Gyi	194585	Inn Khan (or) Inn Kan Gyi		
Let Pat Kone	194586	Inn Khan (or) Inn Kan Gyi		
Inn Yin	194664	Inn Yin		
Thea Taw Lay	194665	Inn Yin		
Kaing	194708	Kaing		
Ywar Thit	194709	Kaing		
Aung Thar	194710	Kaing		
Moe Kaung Kone	194711	Kaing		
Taung Kaing	194712	Kaing		
Pway Sone Kone	194713	Kaing		
Khan Beit	194693	Khan Beit		
Yae Aungt	194694	Khan Beit		
Pyi Taw Thar	194695	Khan Beit		
Khan Taw	194543	Khan Taw		
Aung Thar	194544	Khan Taw		
Kha Tet Kone	194535	Kha Tet Kone		
Pe Lun Kone	194536	Kha Tet Kone		
Dar Hat	194537	Kha Tet Kone		
Khin Ban	194594	Khin Ban		
Khin Gyi	194593	Khin Gyi		
Koke Ko Khar Hla	194521	Koke Ko Khar Hla		
Kan Pat Lel	194522	Koke Ko Khar Hla		
Gway Kan	194523	Koke Ko Khar Hla		
Nyaung Pin Kone	194524	Koke Ko Khar Hla		
Koke Ko Su	194538	Koke Ko Su		
Yoe Kan	194539	Koke Ko Su		
Kone	194540	Koke Ko Su		
Ywar Haung	194541	Koke Ko Su		
Ku Ni	194542	Koke Ko Su		
Kone	194625	Kone		
Kone Gyi	194547	Kone Gyi		
Kyat Kan	194548	Kone Gyi		
Ku Lar	194692	Ku Lar		
Kyaung Kone	194657	Kyaung Kone		
Than Bo	194658	Kyaung Kone		
Ywar Thit	194659	Kyaung Kone		
Taung Pu Lu	194660	Kyaung Kone		
Kywei Kan	194724	Kywei Kan		
Lein Pin	194613	Lein Pin		
Kyaung Kone	194614	Lein Pin		
Hta Naung Kone	194615	Lein Pin		
Nwar Nan	194616	Lein Pin		
Zaung Gyan Kone	194617	Lein Pin		
Lu Khin	194683	Lu Khin		
Pyar Swea (East)	194684	Lu Khin		
Pyar Swea (West)	194685	Lu Khin		
Hpone Soe	194686	Lu Khin		
Nga Yant Kone	194687	Lu Khin		
Boke Kone	194688	Lu Khin		
Ma Hlwa Pin	194654	Ma Hlwa Pin		
Myay Taing Kan	194592	Myay Taing Kan		
Nat Kan (East)	194702	Nat Kan		
Nat Kan (West)	194703	Nat Kan		
Nay Pu Kone	194609	Nay Pu Kone		
Sat Khin	194610	Nay Pu Kone		
Thee	194611	Nay Pu Kone		
Zee Kyin	194612	Nay Pu Kone		
Naung Oke Hpee	194595	Nyaung Oke Hpee		
Kan Thar	194596	Nyaung Oke Hpee		
Done Kone	194597	Nyaung Oke Hpee		
Kywe Thar	194598	Nyaung Oke Hpee		
Yoe	194599	Nyaung Oke Hpee		
Nyaung Pin	194569	Nyaung Pin		
Chin Thayt Let	194570	Nyaung Pin		
Nyaung Pin Thar	194635	Nyaung Pin Thar		
Se	194636	Nyaung Pin Thar		
Nyaung To	194514	Nyaung To		
Thea Kan	194515	Nyaung To		
Myin Thar	194516	Nyaung To		
Yone Su	194517	Nyaung To		
Wet Let	194518	Nyaung To		
Ma Yan	194519	Nyaung To		
Ywar Thar Aye	194520	Nyaung To		
Oh Ma Twayt	194645	Oh Ma Twayt		
Khan Bu	194646	Oh Ma Twayt		
Pa Din Ywar Ma	194530	Pa Din		
Pa Din Kone Gyi	194531	Pa Din		
Pa Din (West)	194532	Pa Din		
Pa Din Kwayt Gyi	194533	Pa Din		
Ma Gyi Kone	194534	Pa Din		
Pan Kyaing	194643	Pan Kyaing		
Ohe Pyon Kan	194644	Pan Kyaing		
Pe Khin Kyaw	194652	Pe Khin Kyaw		
Ta Mar Kone	194653	Pe Khin Kyaw		
Pe Nant Thar	194549	Pe Nant Thar		
Kan Gyi	194550	Pe Nant Thar		
Ywar Thar Aye	194551	Pe Nant Thar		
Tha Pyay Yoe	194552	Pe Nant Thar		
Pindale	194676	Pin Ta Le		
Kan Auk	194677	Pin Ta Le		
Laymyethnar	194678	Pin Ta Le		
Se (North)	194527	Se		
Inn Kone	194528	Se		
Ah Lan Mel Kone	194529	Se		
Se (South)	194725	Se (South)		
Konekan	194726	Se (South)		
Taung Nyo	194727	Se (South)		
Shauk Taw	194670	Shauk Taw		
Nyan Kan	194671	Shauk Taw		
Pa La War	194672	Shauk Taw		
Kwayt Gyi	194673	Shauk Taw		
Sin Thay Kwayt	194674	Shauk Taw		
Shwe Hpa Lar Kan (North)	194647	Shwe Hpa Lar Kan		
Shwe Hpa Lar Kan (South)	194648	Shwe Hpa Lar Kan		
Sein Pan Pin	194649	Shwe Hpa Lar Kan		
Pauk Taw (East)	194650	Shwe Hpa Lar Kan		
Pauk Taw (West)	194651	Shwe Hpa Lar Kan		
Shwe Taung	194555	Shwe Taung		
Ngwe Bon Thar	194556	Shwe Taung		
Shwe Bon Thar	194557	Shwe Taung		
Shwe Gan	194558	Shwe Taung		
Pu Lu Kone	194559	Shwe Taung		
Sin Chi Taing	194565	Sin Chi Taing		
Shwe Ku	194566	Sin Chi Taing		
Sar Taung	194567	Sin Chi Taing		
Dee Toke Kwayt	194568	Sin Chi Taing		
Su Pan	194587	Su Pan		
Kan Swei	194588	Su Pan		
Tha Yet Kan	194589	Su Pan		
Myin Kya Kan	194590	Su Pan		
Ta Mar Kan	194626	Ta Mar Kan		
Tha Nat Khar Taw	194627	Ta Mar Kan		
Kyauk Oe	194628	Ta Mar Kan		
Oke Hne	194629	Ta Mar Kan		
Min Kone	194630	Ta Mar Kan		
Se	194631	Ta Mar Kan		
Taung Bo	194545	Taung Bo		
Su Hpyu Kan	194546	Taung Bo		
Tesu	194675	Te Su		
Tha But Kone	194632	Tha But Kone		
Pe Pyit	194633	Tha But Kone		
Koke Ko Taw	194634	Tha But Kone		
Tha Hpan	194728	Tha Hpan		
Tha Khut Myint	194554	Tha Khut Myint		
Tha Nat Khar Taw	194571	Tha Nat Khar Taw		
Kyut Kan (South)	194572	Tha Nat Khar Taw		
Kyut Kan (North)	194573	Tha Nat Khar Taw		
Kyut Kan Kwet Thit	194574	Tha Nat Khar Taw		
Kha Tet Kan	194575	Tha Nat Khar Taw		
Htein Kan	194576	Tha Nat Khar Taw		
Sa Mon	194583	Thin Gan Swea		
Na Be Kan	194584	Thin Gan Swea		
Thonedauntaing	194689	Thone Daunt Aing		
Ywar Thit	194690	Thone Daunt Aing		
Kyin	194691	Thone Daunt Aing		
Yae Sone	194511	Yae Sone		
Kin Ywar Kone	194512	Yae Sone		
Kyaung Kone	194513	Yae Sone		
Yae Twin	194637	Yae Twin		
Leik Tet	194638	Yae Twin		
Koe Kar Taw	194639	Yae Twin		
Ka Lar Kar	194640	Yae Twin		
Kyaung Kone	194641	Yae Twin		
Ma Gyi Taw	194642	Yae Twin		
Yar Thin Char	194718	Yar Thin Char		
Kyar Thay Kan	194720	Yar Thin Char		
Se	194721	Yar Thin Char		
Kin	194723	Yar Thin Char		
Yoe Sone	194622	Yoe Sone		
Tha Pyay Thar	194623	Yoe Sone		
Ma Gyi Oke	194624	Yoe Sone		
Ywar Tan	194697	Ywar Tan		
Za Gyan Kone	194698	Ywar Tan		
Hlyaw Pin	194699	Ywar Tan		
Ywar Thit	194700	Ywar Tan		
Gone Kwayt	194701	Ywar Tan		
Ywar Wai	194714	Ywar Wai		
Kan Pauk Gyi	194715	Ywar Wai		
Yae Lel Kwayt	194716	Ywar Wai		
Kan To	194717	Ywar Wai		
Ywe Thee	194618	Ywe Thee		
Kyauk Pon	194619	Ywe Thee		
Son Kone	194620	Ywe Thee		
Koke Ko Pin	194621	Ywe Thee		
Za Win	194655	Za Win		
Aing Thar	194656	Za Win		
