= Pindale =

Pindale ပင်းတလဲ
- Village
- Location within Myanmar
- Coordinates: 21°10′10″N 95°50′54″E
- Country: Burma
- Division: Mandalay Division
- District: Meiktila District
- Township: Wundwin Township
- Village: Pindale
- Time zone: UTC+6:30 (MMT)

Pindale is a village in the Wundwin Township, Mandalay Division of central Myanmar.

== See also ==
- Pindale Min
