= Kalaw–Thazi Railway =

Railway line in Myanmar

Kalaw-Thazi Railway ကလော-သာစည် ရထားလမ်း
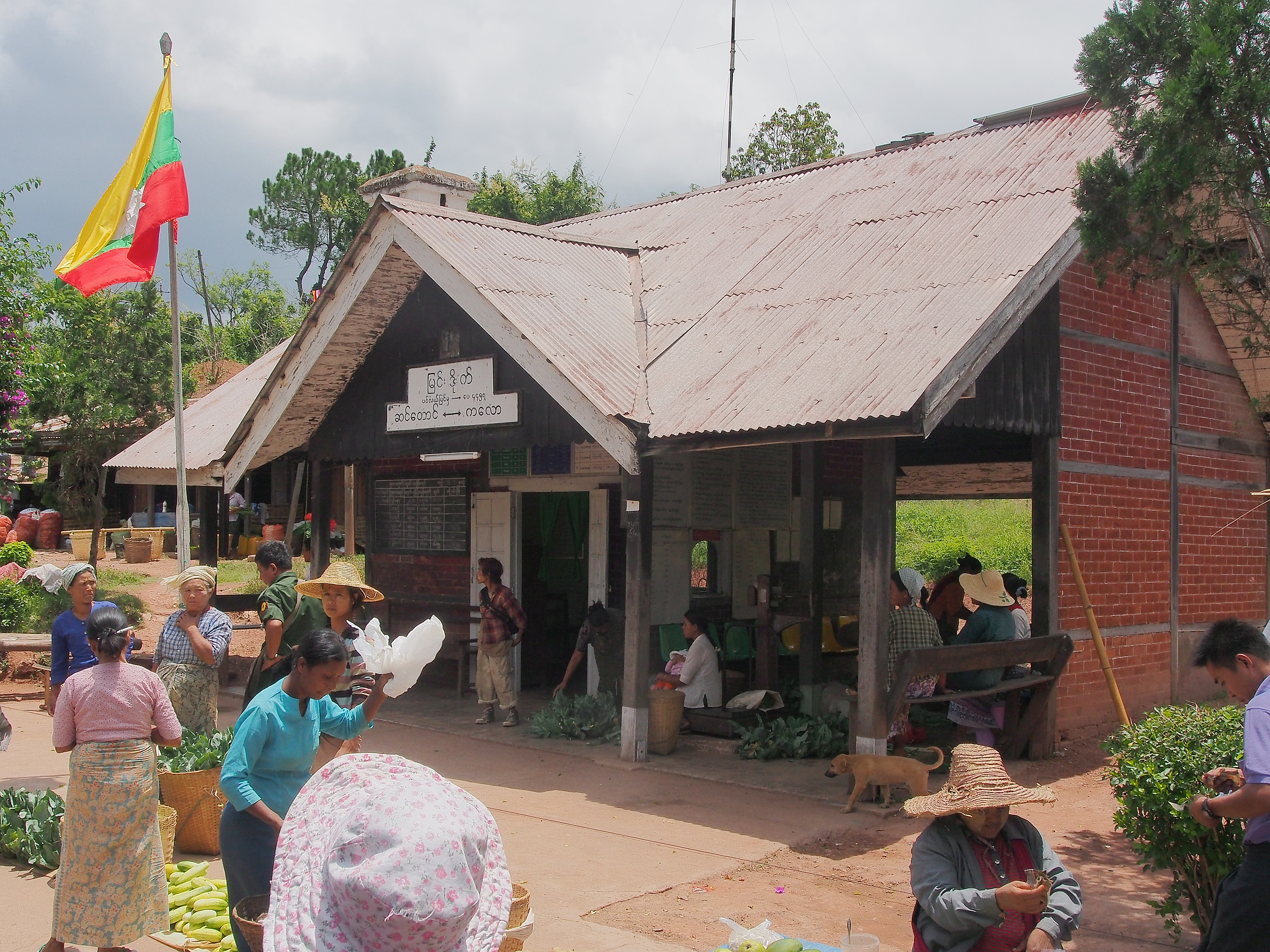

Overview
- Owner: Myanma Railways
- Locale: Kalaw - Thazi
- Number of stations: 12

Operation
- Began operation: May 2, 1921

Technical
- System length: 63.1 m
- Track gauge: 1,000 mm (3 ft 3 3/8 in)

Kalaw-Thazi Railway is a 1000 mm (3 ft 3 3/8 in) meter gauge railway line that runs from Thazi Station to Kalaw Station. It is the second railway in Shan State constructed by the British, following the Northern Shan Railway.

== History ==
The British initially aimed to connect the mountainous town of Kalaw to Thazi by rail. In 1909, the government granted permission for the construction of the Thazi-Shwenyaung line. The construction was carried out by the Burma Railway Company under a lease, funded by local revenue.

Construction from Thazi began in 1912, and during this period, the outbreak of World War I led to the deployment of Turkish prisoners of war as laborers. On December 15, 1914, the railway reached Kalaw. Due to its elevation at 1,406 meters above sea level, the route to Kalaw was a mountainous path built with several viaducts and tunnels. The Cave tunnel was completed in 1913.

Similar to the Mandalay-Lashio section, the mountainous terrain required cutting through steep slopes and ravines, making the construction challenging and costly, with expenses totaling over 15 million rupees (210,000 rupees per mile). When the line from Thazi reached Aungban, about 70 miles away, the government transferred operations to the Burma Railway Company. Subsequently, the line was extended from Aungban 17 miles to Heho and another 11 miles from Heho to Shwenyaung.

The final stretch from Kalaw to Shwenyaung was completed in 1921, with the railway reaching Shwenyaung on May 2, 1921. The "Cycle of Life Bridge" located at milepost 379/7-8 between Heho and Shwenyaung became famous.

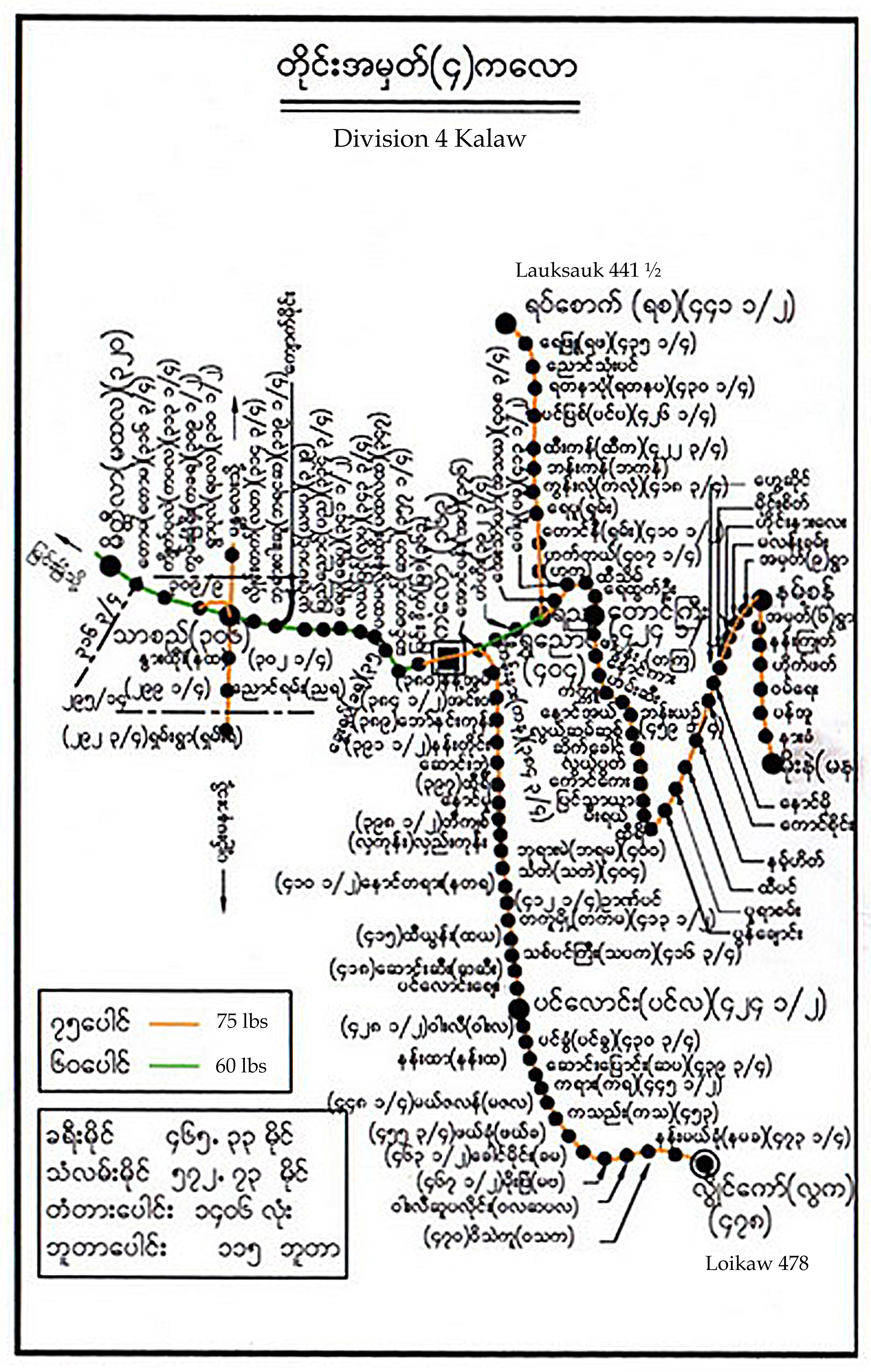
Myanmar Railways station map Division 4 Kalaw

== Stations ==
  - (1) Kalaw 369
  - (2) Myin Daik 361
  - (3) Hsin Taung 357 1/4
  - (4) Khway Yok 352
  - (5) Pa Ta Ma Lun Hto 347
  - (6) Le Byin 343 3/4
  - (7) Ye Bu 341 1/2
  - (8) Pyi Nyaung 334 3/4
  - (9) Yin Ma Pin 329
  - (10) Pa Ya Nga Zu 319 1/4 Spur Line to the quarry
  - (11) Hlaing Tet 314 3/4
  - (12) Thazi 306 (Junction) to Mandalay and Pyinmana
