= Taungpulu Kaba-Aye Sayadaw =

Burmese Buddhist monk (1897–1986)

Taungpulu Tawya Kaba-Aye Sayadaw U Nandiya တောင်ပုလုတောရကမ္ဘာအေးဆရာတော် ဦးနန္ဒိယ
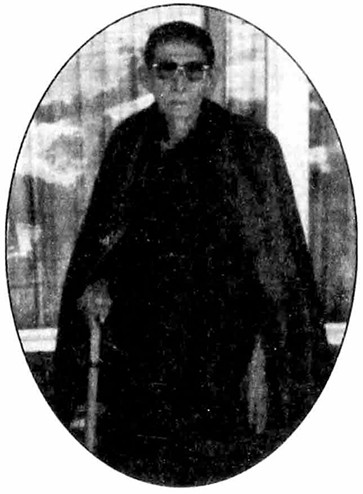
- Title: Sayadaw

Personal life
- Born: Maung Paw Lar; 20 March 1897 (3rd waning day of Tabaung 1258 ME) Tesu village, Wundwin, Myanmar
- Died: 7 June 1986 (aged 89) Yangon, Myanmar
- Occupation: Buddhist monk

Religious life
- Religion: Buddhism
- School: Theravada
- Dharma names: Nandiya နန္ဒိယ

Senior posting
- Based in: Taungpulu Forest Monastery, Wundwin Township, Mandalay Division

Taungpulu Tawya Kaba-Aye Sayadaw U Nandiya (Burmese: တောင်ပုလုတောရကမ္ဘာအေးဆရာတော်ဦးနန္ဒိယ, 20 March 1897 – 7 June 1986) was an influential Theravada Buddhist monk. Taungpulu Sayadaw was born in Tesu Village, Wundwin Township of Myanmar. He was the eldest chief of U Yan and Daw Shwe The. His childhood name was Maung Paw Lar.

He was founder of the Taungpulu Kaba Aye Monastery in Boulder Creek, California.

== Early life ==
At the age of 13, he became a monk with the title of Shinnandia from U Teja, a monk in Tesu village, and studied the basic Pitaka literature. At the age of 20, he received the monastic orders from U Tun Aye and Daw Kyar Baw, both of Tesu village, and entered the order of monks. The monk studied the three Pitaka literatures, namely the Sutta, Vinaya, and Abhidhamma, at the Dakshinarama Pagoda, Shwebo Kyaung, in Mandalay, under U Asara, He learned from the monks of the Pagoda Gyidaik, U Zeya, U Tejawanta, U Nara, and the monk of the Pakokku Kwee Pte O Seik, U Thasana.

== Monk Life ==
Then, in 1287, at the request of his brother, the monk Ashin Nanda, the monk of the Thāsi Rele Monastery, he taught literature to more than 100 students at the Thāsi Rele Monastery. The monk, who arrived as a monk, received the title of Ganāvasaka, a monk of the Thāsi Rele Monastery, and the special title of Mulā Dhammasāriya.

Since the monk had been more enthusiastic about Vipassana meditation since his youth, when he received 20 years of ordination, he gave up teaching literature and went to Pyūbwe City, Dwinyawa, He went to Theindaung Towra Monastery and practiced Vipassana mindfulness.

Then he called his disciples, Htoo Dwin Sayadaw and Ashin Nandabhasa, and went on foot to Thaton City Mingun Jetawan Sayadaw, carrying a bowl and three robes, and all the dhutin he could afford. At the Mingun Jetawan Sayadaw, he studied the rules and regulations of Patimauk, alms, and the establishment of the robe, and he practiced the Mahasatipatthana and Vipassana for two years.

Then the Venerable One went to the monastery at Khron Village, Mawlamyine Township, about six miles from Mawlamyine, and taught and instructed Vipassana meditation for two years. After teaching the code of practice for four years in the lower region, he returned to his native village and practiced the practice of Vipassana and the thirteen Dhutin meditation practices for 12 years. The monks who were building the Taungpulu Dam requested the Buddha to build a small school building with a roof over it in 1313. From the time the monk lived in the school, he became known as the Taungpulu Tora Sayadaw. In 1315, he began to build the Taungpulu Tora Kabaraye Dhamma Reikitshara. As a meditation monk at Taungpulu Tora, he taught and guided more than seventy monks every year. The monk, by replacing the original pagoda built in the time of King Anawrahta in Tesu village, and referring to the seven elements of enlightenment, built the Mya Minju Stone Pagoda, measuring 111 taung, 1 hwa, 1 mik, and 1 leth, in the style of the Shwedagon Pagoda, between 1337 and 1342. As well as being well-versed in the Buddhist literature, the monk was also particularly famous for his Vipassana meditation and meditation practices. Just as he himself diligently practiced the 13 precepts that monks are required to practice, he also diligently taught the 13 precepts to his disciples. The Buddha's Kayagata Patthān practice, the method of sampānyapabba practice, the way to build a permanent Sarānagon, the highest and most noble practice, the sermon on the samvaga katha, the sermon on charity, the various moral precepts, and the meditation are the essence of the Dhamma that can be understood in a concise and clear manner.

== Missionary Journeys ==
The Venerable visited the eastern and northeastern parts of Myanmar, reaching Musi, Namkham, Shweli Bridge and Border Point 81, Rakhine in the west, Mrkaung U in the north, Myitkyina and Putao in the south of Myanmar. While preaching in the south, he even traveled on a stretcher to Shwe Kyun, located in the strait between Kawthong and Ranong.

The Venerable visited the United States of America for the first time in 1978, and for the second time in 1981. He visited Myanmar for the third time in 1983 and the fourth time in 1985. He also visited United Kingdom, India, Nepal, and Thailand and carried out missionary work with great effort. He built the Shwe Thein Taw Kabar Aye Pagoda in the courtyard of the Taung Pulu Kabar Aye Monastery in the Boladakari region of the United States of America. After returning to Myanmar from a foreign missionary trip in 1985, he continued to visit various parts of Myanmar and carry out missionary work.

== Death ==
The venerable Nandiyya of Taungpulu passed away on the waning moon of the month of Kason (June 7, 1986) at the Taungpulu Sutaungpye Monastery on University Avenue. His disciples carried his body to his birthplace, Tesu Village, Wandwin Township, Mandalay Region, and performed the last rites on the waning moon of the month of Nayon in the Burmese calendar.
