= Konekan =

Konekan ကုန်းကန်
- Village
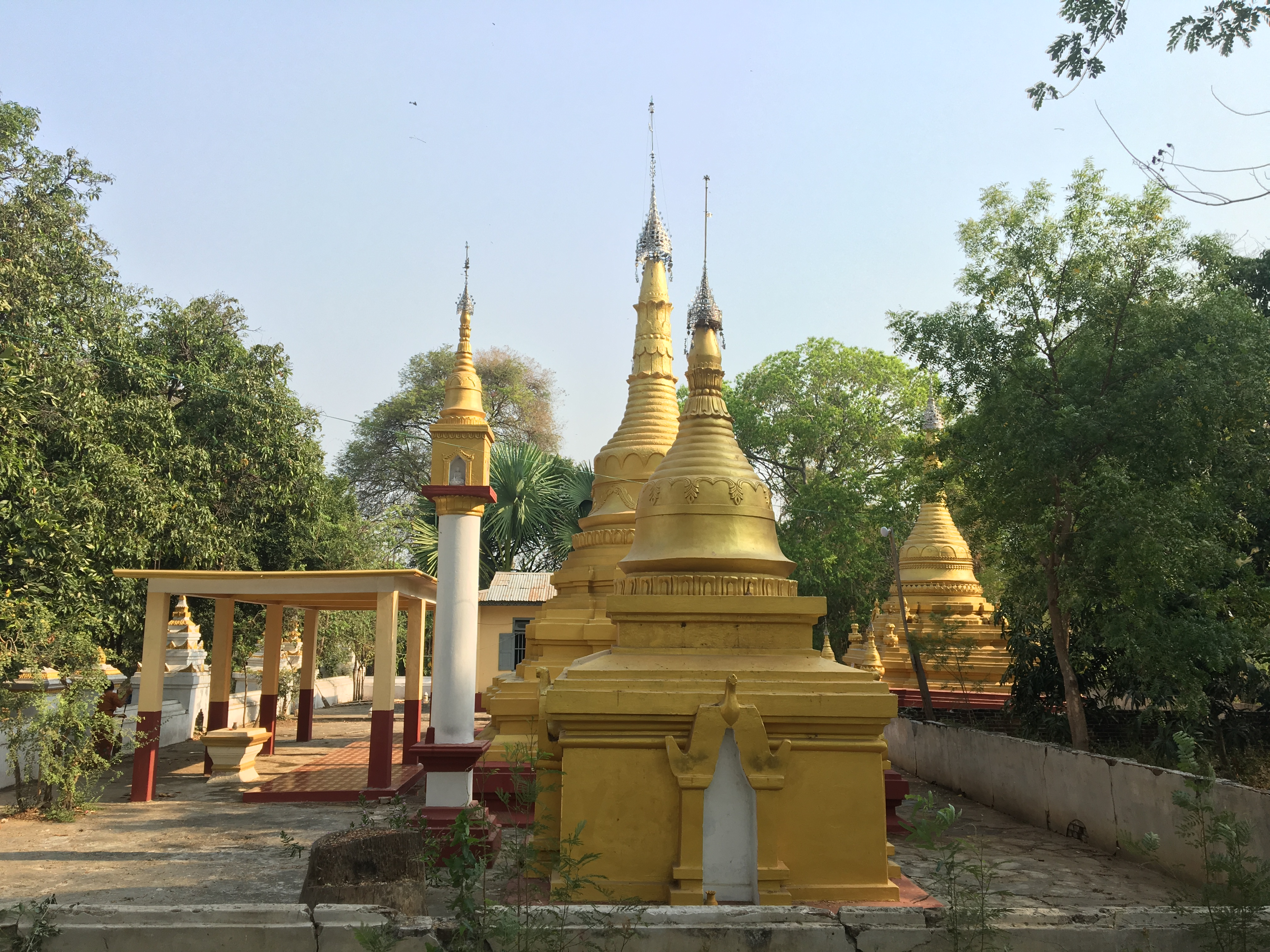
- Konekan Monastery

- Location within Myanmar
- Coordinates: 21°05′00″N 95°52′29″E
- Country: Myanmar
- Region: Mandalay Region
- District: Meiktila District
- Township: Wundwin Township
- Village: Konekan
- Time zone: UTC+6:30 (MMT)

Konekan is a village in the Wundwin Township, Mandalay Region of central Myanmar.
