= Khin Maung Win =

Khin Maung Win may refer to:

- Khin Maung Win (mathematician) (1940–2021), Burmese writer and professor at Yangon University
- Khin Maung Win (physician) (born 1949), Burmese hepatologist, writer and businessman
- Khin Maung Win (politician, born 1955), House of Nationalities MP for Tanintharyi
- Khin Maung Win (politician, born 1958), Amyotha Hluttaw MP for Sagaing
