= Aung Thu (politician, born 1966) =

Burmese politician

- အောင်သူ
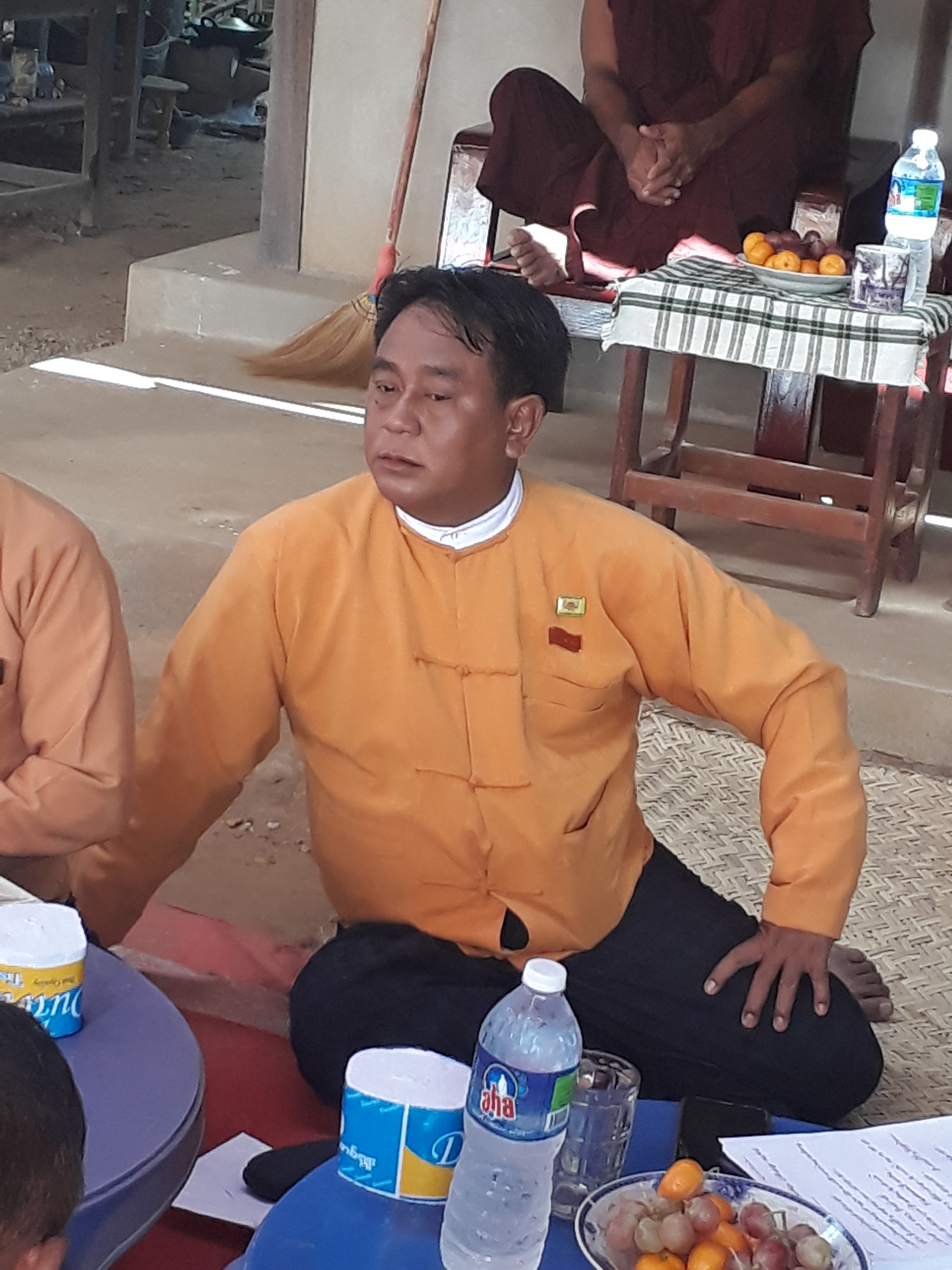

Member of the Mandalay Region Hluttaw
- Incumbent
- Assumed office 8 February 2016
- Constituency: Wundwin Township

Personal details
- Born: 9 June 1966 (age 60) Tesu Village, Wundwin Township, Mandalay Region, Myanmar
- Party: National League for Democracy
- Spouse: Win Myint Kyi
- Relations: Htun Kyaing (father); Hla Nyunt (mother)
- Children: Phyo Myint Aung Thu
- Education: Yangon University of Economics (B.Econ)
- Occupation: Politician

Aung Thu (Burmese: အောင်သူ; born 9 June 1966) is a Burmese politician who currently serves as a member of parliament in the Mandalay Region Hluttaw for Wundwin No. 2 Constituency. He is a member of the National League for Democracy.

== Early life ==
Aung Thu was born on 9 June 1966 in Tesu Village, Wundwin Township, Mandalay Region, Myanmar parents to Htun Kyaing and his wife Hla Nyunt. He graduated B.Ecom from Yangon University of Economics.

== Political career ==
In the 2015 Myanmar general election, he contested the Mandalay Region Hluttaw from Wundwin Township No. 2 parliamentary constituency. He is currently serves as a member of Mandalay Region Parliament's Transport, Communications and Construction Committee.
