= Laymyethnar =

Laymyethnar လေးမျက်နှာရွာ
- Village
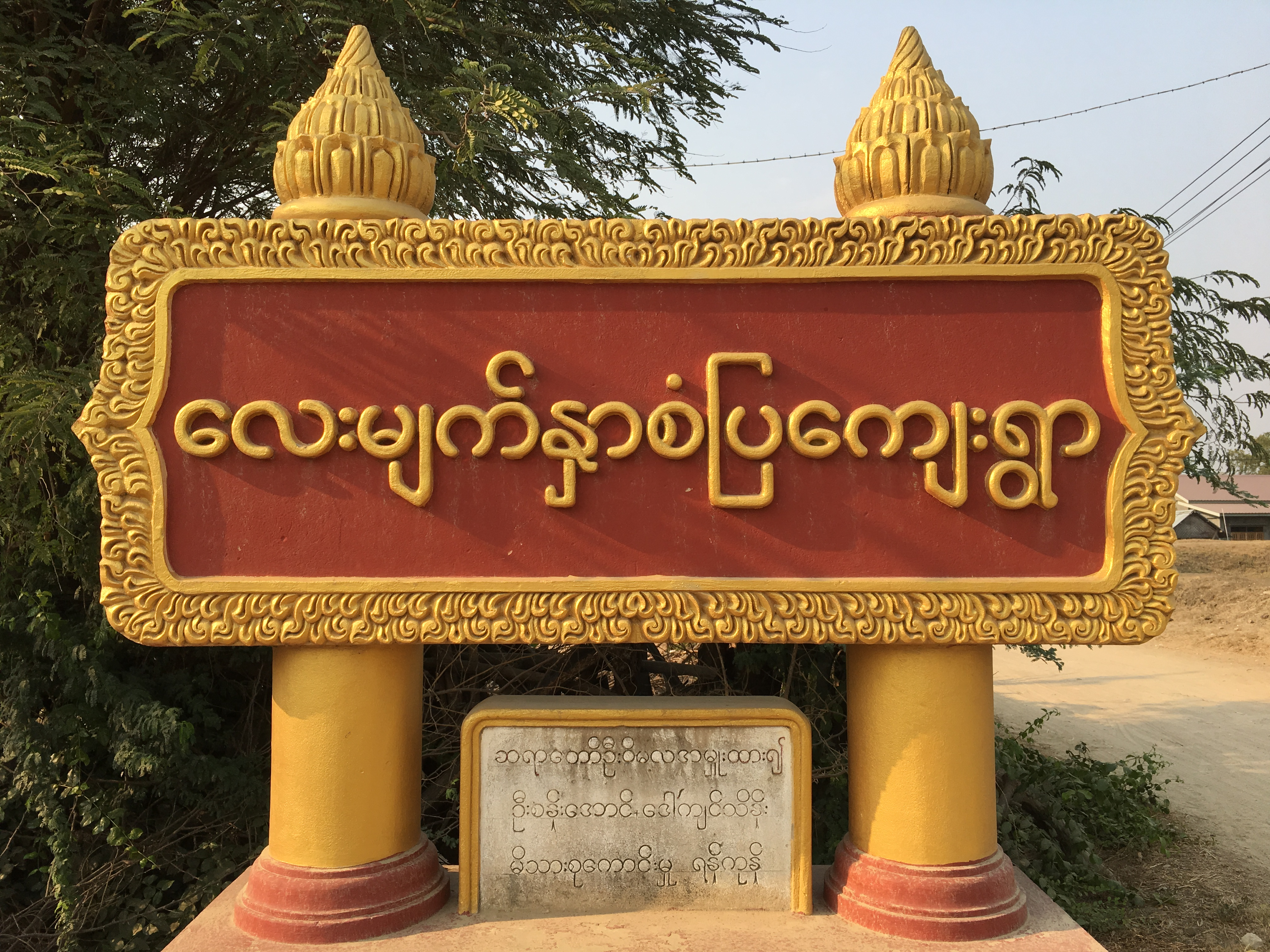
- Laymyethnar

- Location within Myanmar
- Coordinates: 21°09′23″N 95°51′30″E
- Country: Burma
- Division: Mandalay Division
- District: Meiktila District
- Township: Wundwin Township
- Village: Laymyethnar
- Time zone: UTC+6:30 (MMT)

Laymyethnar is a village in the Wundwin Township, Mandalay Division of central Myanmar.
