= Yonepinkone =

Yonepinkone ရုန်းပင်ကုန်း
- Village
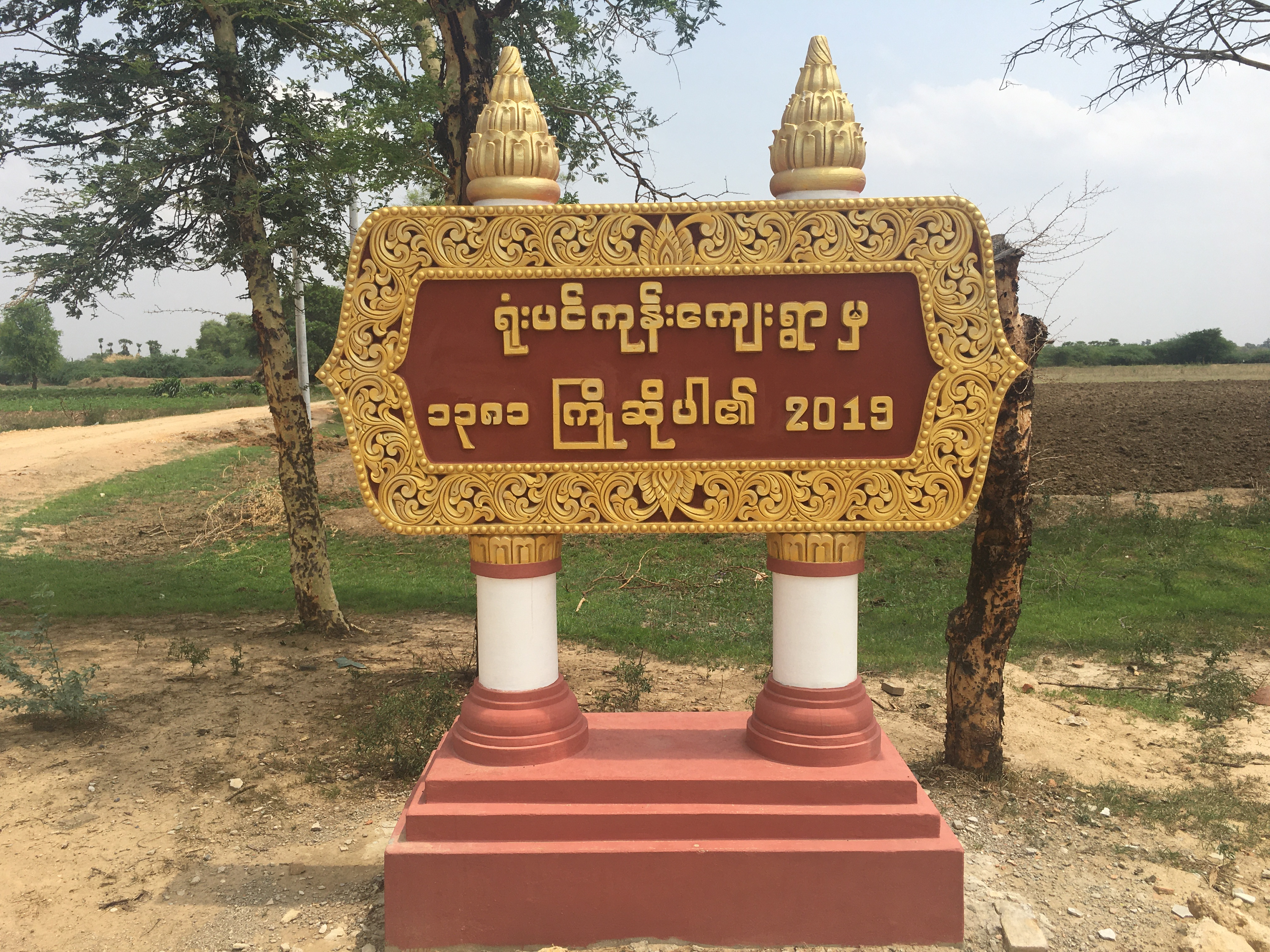

- Location within Myanmar
- Coordinates: 21°09′52″N 95°52′50″E
- Country: Burma
- Division: Mandalay Division
- District: Meiktila District
- Township: Wundwin Township
- Village: Yonepinkone
- Time zone: UTC+6:30 (MMT)

Yonepinkone is a village in the Wundwin Township, Mandalay Region of central Myanmar.
