= Thonedauntaing =

Thonedauntaing သုံးဒေါင့်အိုင်
- Village
- Location within Myanmar
- Coordinates: 21°10′22″N 95°54′10″E
- Country: Burma
- Division: Mandalay Division
- District: Meiktila District
- Township: Wundwin Township
- Village: Thonedauntaing
- Time zone: UTC+6:30 (MMT)

Thonedauntaing is a village in the Wundwin Township, Mandalay Division of central Myanmar.
