= Mahlaing =

- Town
- Location in Burma
- Coordinates: 21.09°N 95.64°E
- Country: Myanmar
- Division: Mandalay Region
- District: Meiktila District
- Township: Mahlaing Township

Population (2005)
  - Total: 157,674
  - Religions: Buddhism
- Time zone: UTC+6.30 (MST)

Mahlaing is a town in the Mandalay Division of central Myanmar. Its most famous its boarding school, "Family Private School".
