= Myamyinzu Pagoda =

Buddhist Pagoda in Meiktila, Myanmar

- မြမဉ္ဇူစေတီ
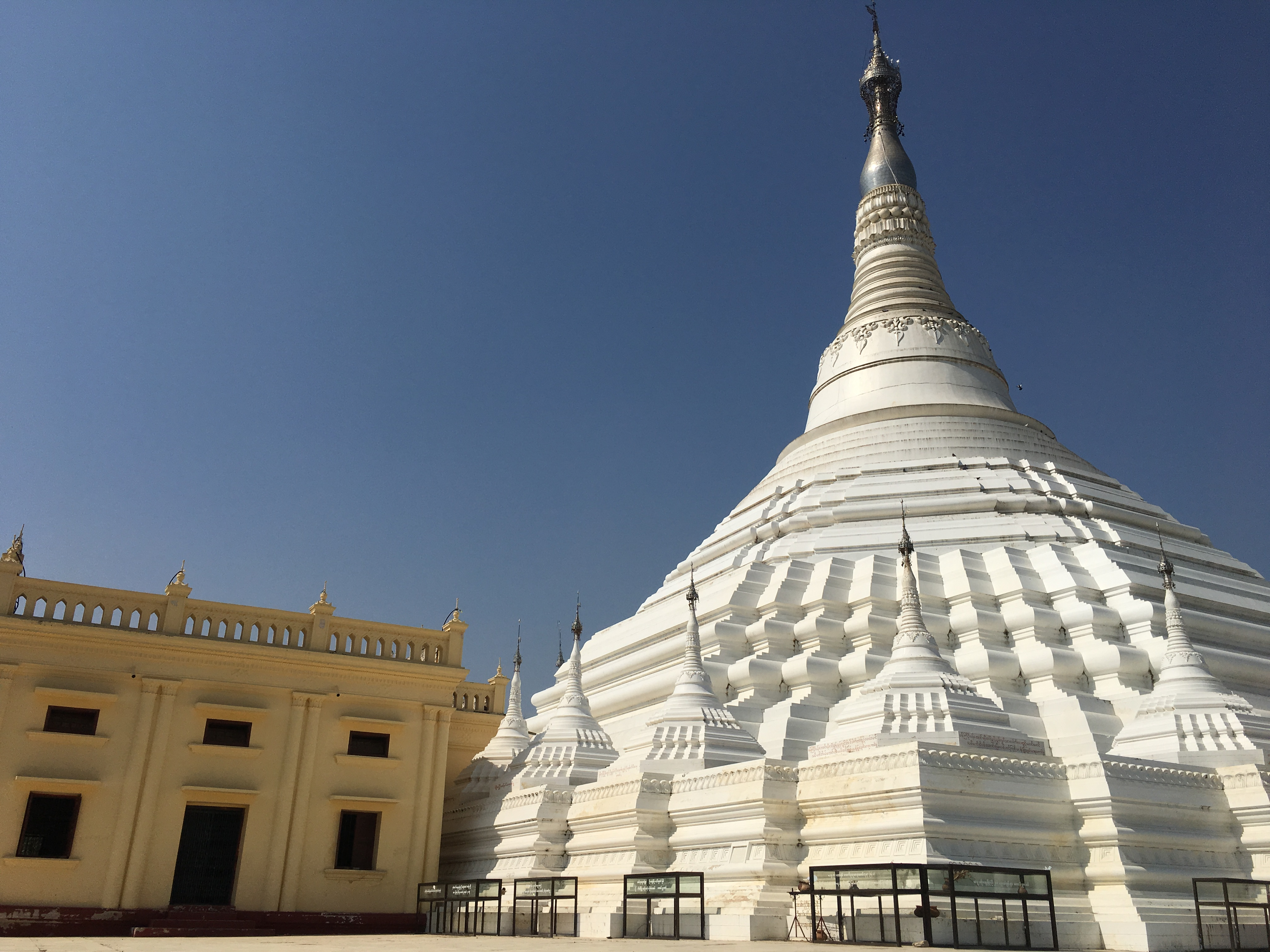

- Location within Myanmar

Religion
- Affiliation: Theravada Buddhism

Location
- Location: Tesu, Wundwin Township
- Country: Myanmar
- Coordinates: 21.1454531°N 95.850814°E

Architecture
- Completed: 1981; 45 years ago

The Myamyinzu Pagoda (Burmese: မြမဉ္ဇူစေတီ) is a Buddhist pagoda located in Tesu village, in the Mandalay Division of Myanmar.
