= Aung =

Aung may refer to:

- Aung (name), including a list of people with the name
- Aung Yang, a village in Shwegu Township, Bhamo District, Kachin State
- Myan Aung, a town in the Ayeyarwady Region
