= Tesu =

TESU may refer to:

- Thomas Edison State University, in Trenton, New Jersey.
- Tesu (village), a village in central Myanmar.
