= The Eternal Mother =

The Eternal Mother can refer to:

- The Eternal Mother (1912 film), a 1912 film
- The Eternal Mother (1917 film), a 1917 film
- The Eternal Mother (1920 film), a 1920 film
- Eternal Mother (2017 film), a Burmese drama film
