= Eternal Mother (2017 film) =

2017 Burmese drama film

- ထာဝရအမေ
- Directed by: Sin Yaw Mg Mg
- Written by: Dr. Khin Maung Win
- Screenplay by: Moe Ni Lwin
- Based on: the true story of the famous doctor, Dr Khin Mg Win
- Starring: Nay Toe; Wutt Hmone Shwe Yee; Ye Aung; May Than Nu
- Release date: December 2017
- Country: Myanmar
- Language: Burmese

The Eternal Mother (Burmese: ထာဝရအမေ), a Burmese drama film created by Sin Yaw Mg Mg is based on the true story novel, "Mother and I", by Dr. Khin Maung Win. This is the first cooperated film between Sin Yaw Mg Mg and May Than Nu who did not work together since their separation 12 years ago. Their son, Min Thant Mg Mg, work as a deputy director for this film. This film was aired in Singapore.

== Plot ==
Khin Maung Win is the son of a police officer. After his father retires from the police department, they moved to their home town, Wundwin. His mother, Daw Khin Khin, worked hard so that her children could go to school. Among her children, only Khin Mg Win passed the matriculation exam with three distinctions, and later he attended the University of Medicine, Mandalay. He then met with Khin Lay Yee. Not long after he became a professor, his mother died.

== Cast ==
=== Main ===
- Nay Toe as Khin Maung Win
- Wutt Hmone Shwe Yi as Khin Lay Yi (spouse of Khin Maung Win)
- May Than Nu as Daw Khin Khin (Mother of Khin Maung Win)
- Ye Aung as Khin Maung Win's father

=== Supporting ===
- Htun Ko Ko as Khin Maung Win's deputy
- Zin Aung as Khin Maung Win's elder brother

== Shooting locations ==
=== Myanmar ===
- Mandalay
- Yangon
- Wundwin
- Pyin Oo Lwin

=== Singapore ===
- Singapore

=== England ===
- London

== Awards and nominations ==
Year	Award	Category	Nominee	Result
2017	Myanmar Motion Picture Academy Awards	Best Picture	Zin Yaw Films	Nominated
2017	Myanmar Motion Picture Academy Awards	Best Actress	May Than Nu	Nominated
2017	Myanmar Motion Picture Academy Awards	Best Supporting Actor	Ye Aung	Nominated
2017	Myanmar Motion Picture Academy Awards	Best Cinematography	Win Lwin Htet	Nominated
2017	Myanmar Motion Picture Academy Awards	Best Director	Zin Yaw Maung Maung	Won
2017	Myanmar Motion Picture Academy Awards	Best Sound	Thein Aung	Won
2017	Myanmar Motion Picture Academy Awards	Best Editing	Owin	Won
