= San Tun =

- ဆန်းထွန်း

Member of the Amyotha Hluttaw
- Incumbent
- Assumed office 30 March 2011
- Preceded by: Constituency established
- Constituency: Thazi Township No. 2
- Majority: 34,092 (68%)

Personal details
- Born: 2 March 1951 (age 75) Rangoon, Burma
- Party: Union Solidarity and Development Party
- Spouse: Tin Sein
- Children: Khin Ei Ei Tun, Min Thant, Khin Mi Mi Tun

Military service
- Allegiance: Myanmar
- Branch/service: Myanmar Army
- Rank: Brigadier General

San Tun (Burmese: ဆန်းထွန်း) is a Burmese politician and former military officer. He is an incumbent member of the Amyotha Hluttaw. He previously served as a Northern Deputy Regional Commander for the Myanmar Army.

San Tun was born on 2 March 1951 in Rangoon, Burma. He is married to Tin Sein.

San Tun contested the 2010 Burmese general election as a Union Solidarity and Development Party candidate for the Amyotha Hluttaw, representing the Thazi Township constituency No. 2. He won the election with 34,092 votes, about 68% of the votes.
