= Aung (name) =

Aung (Burmese: အောင်, MLCTS: aung [àʊɴ]) is a Burmese name. The meaning of "Aung" is ''success'' (according to Burmese).

Notable people with the name include:

- Aung Aung Oo (born 1982), footballer
- Aung Khin (1921–1996), painter
- Aung Myint (born 1946), painter and performance artist
- Aung Pwint (born 1950), journalist
- Bogyoke Aung San (1915–1947), revolutionary
- Aung San Suu Kyi (born 1945), daughter of Aung San, politician
- Aung Thu (disambiguation), multiple people
- Htin Aung (1909–1978), author and scholar
- MiMi Aung (born 1968), engineer and project manager at NASA's Jet Propulsion Laboratory
- Min Ran Aung (1485–1494), king of Arakan
- Thin Thin Aung, Human rights defender from Myanmar
- Zeya Aung (active from 2012), Minister of Energy
