= Khin Maung Win (physician) =

Burmese doctor, author, and businessman

- ခင်မောင်ဝင်း
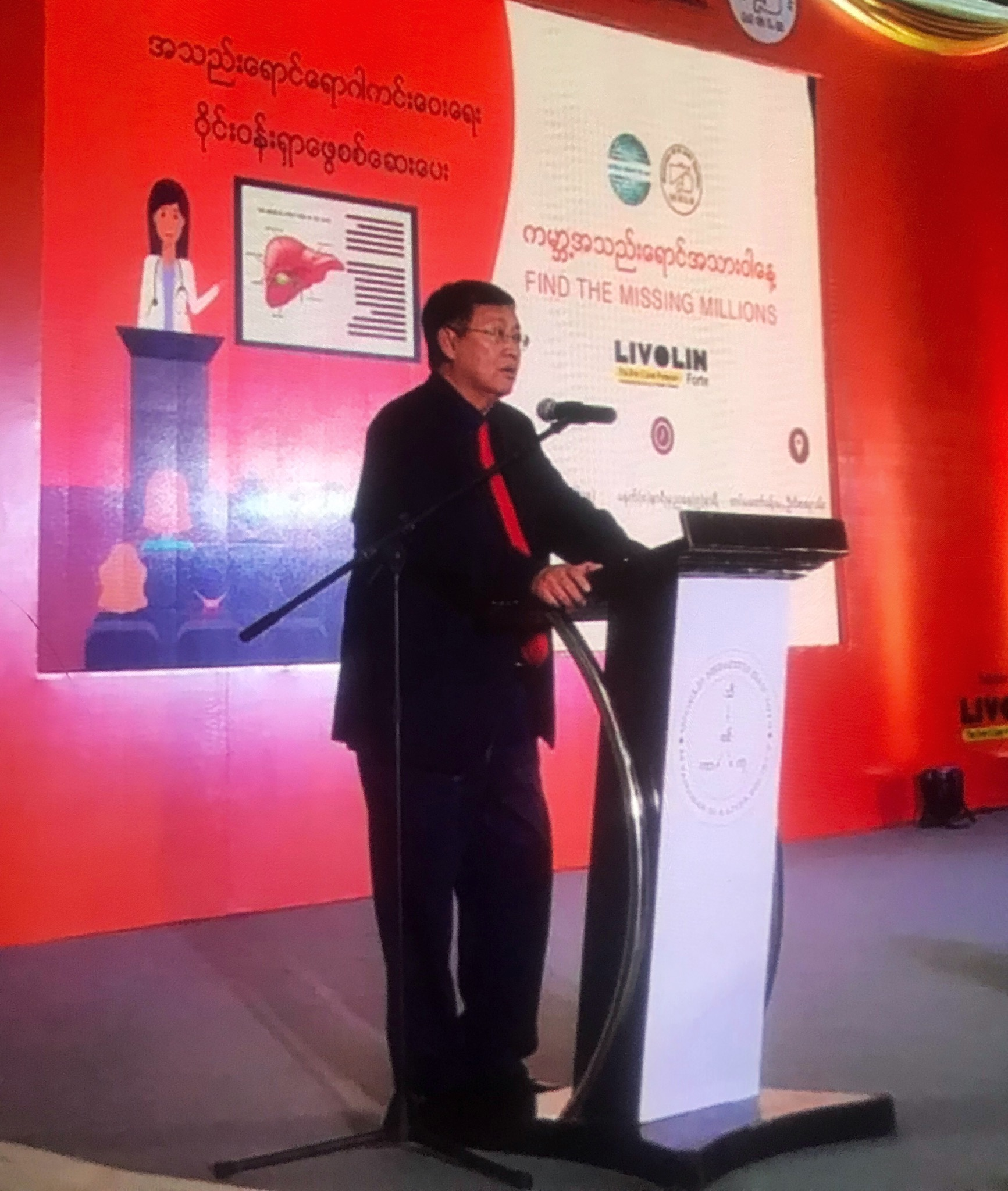
- Born: 11 January 1949 (age 77); Wundwin, Mandalay Region, Myanmar
- Education: Institute of Medicine, Mandalay
- Occupations: Physician; hepatologist; writer
- Spouse: Khin Lay Yi

Khin Maung Win (Burmese: ခင်မောင်ဝင်း; born 12 January 1949) is a Burmese physician, hepatologist, writer and businessman. He is one of the most successful hepatologists in Myanmar and has published many books in his career.

== Early life and education ==
Khin Maung Win was born on 11 January 1949 in Wundwin, Myanmar. He has six siblings. He is the son of Ba Gyan, a police officer and his wife Khin Khin. After his father retires from the police department, they moved to their home town, Wundwin. His mother, Khin Khin worked hard so that her children could go to school. Among her children, only Khin Maung Win passed the matriculation exam with three distinctions, and later he attended the Institute of Medicine, Mandalay. He graduated with M.B.B.S in 1972 and M.Med.Sc. (Int. Med.) in 1978 from Institute of Medicine, Mandalay. He also obtained his MRCP (UK) in 1984 and FRCP (Edin) in 1997 respectively. He was married to Khin Lay Yi, a physician in 1975.

== Career ==
=== Medical career ===
He trained in GI and Liver services in Royal Infirmary Edinburgh (RIE) under Dr. Neil Finlayson in 1983, and joined Liver unit at Royal Free Hospital in London, where he worked as assistant lecturer for six months. Achieved MRCP in 1984 and FRCP in 1997 respectively. After completing the studies, worked as consultant physician (Liver Unit) in Yangon General Hospital (YGH) and became Head of Department of Experimental Medicine, and Department of Medical Research (DMR) in Myanmar.

In 1991, he received a scholarship as Senior Research Fellow from World Health Organization (WHO) and worked at Hôpital Henri-Mondor, Paris for one year under Prof. Daniel Dhumeaux. During one-year stay in France, was trained in clinical Hepatology as well as bench works on effect of TGF on Hepatic stellate cells and was able to publish two-peer-reviewed articles on liver fibrosis.

From 1994 until 2007, he served as Professor and Head of Department of Hepatology in Yangon General Hospital. Subsequently, he established GI & Liver Centre and heads the Department of Hepatology in Yangon GI and Liver Centre to date. Throughout his career, conducted many research works on viral hepatitis and primary liver cancer. Also currently involved in many multi-centre trials as Principal investigator, participating in Investigator initiated trial on 'Phase III Multi-Centre Open-Label Randomized Controlled Trial of Selective internal radiation therapy (SIRT) Versus Sorafenib in Locally Advanced Hepatocellular Carcinoma'.

Affiliated with local associations as well as many international prestigious hepatology associations. One of the greatest achievements is the successful development of Plasma- derived hepatitis B vaccine in Myanmar in collaboration with WHO, CDC and New York Blood Center in 1997 with funding from United Nations Development Programme (UNDP). He had served as chairman of Myanmar Medical Stomach, Intestinal and Liver Disease Group and, as a member of International Hepatitis Group and US liver disease group.

Presently, actively involved in patient care, research and teaching. He devotes his life primarily in patient care and conducts clinical services in many hospitals in Yangon.

=== Publications ===
Khin Maung Win had written articles at Monthly magazines and weekly journals with the pen name Professor Khin Maung Win (liver) and published seven books. He has contributed personal short stories to Kalyar monthly magazine since 2005.

Khin Maung Win has won the 2017 Tun Foundation Literary award in the biography section for his 2016 short-story compilation Amay Hne Kyun Taw (Mother and I). The book which has since been made into a feature-film titled Htarwara Amay (The Eternal Mother) - up for a Myanmar Academy Award, is a collection of autobiographical short-stories exploring the loving relationship Dr Khin Maung Win and his six siblings had with their mother and contains snapshots of life growing-up in middle-Myanmar during the 1950s.

=== Business ===
In 1994, he founded the World-class Laboratory at Myanmar. He is the Director of Yangon GI and Liver Centre which is the only one-stop medical service centre for GI and Liver Disease in Private Sector. He is also the Chairman of Win Sammering Company Limited and Win Hospitals Group of Company.

== See also ==
- Eternal Mother Film
