= Thazi, Myanmar =

Thazi
- Town
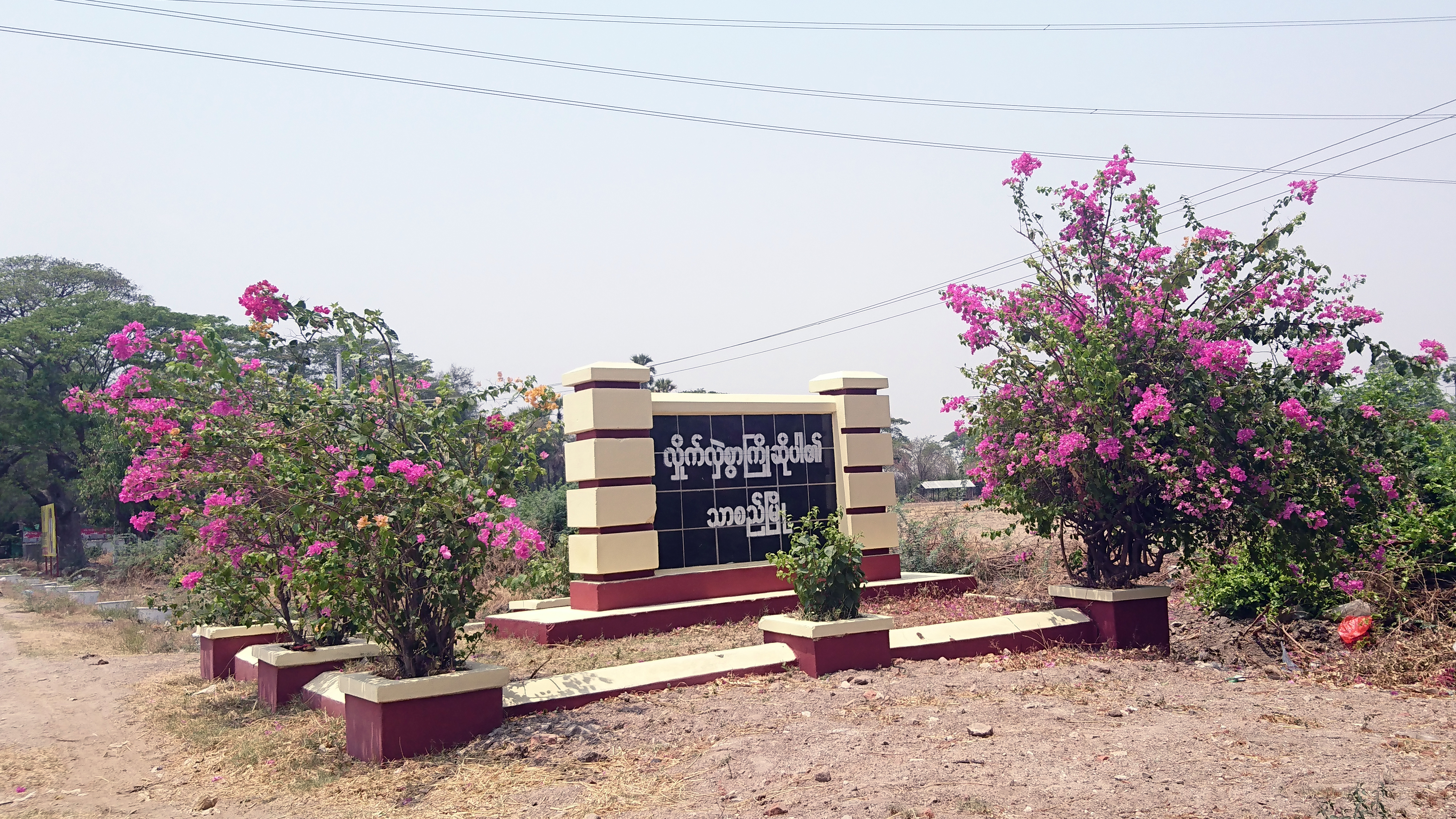

- Location in Myanmar
- Coordinates: 20°50′N 95°59′E
- Country: Myanmar
- Division: Mandalay Region
- District: Meiktila District
- Township: Thazi Township

Population
  - Religions: Buddhism
- Time zone: UTC+6.30 (MST)

Thazi is a town in Thazi Township, Meiktila District, Mandalay Region, central Burma (Myanmar).

== Earthquake and Fault Rupture ==
On March 28th, 2025, a magnitude 7.9 earthquake struck Myanmar, When the earthquake happened it caused a rupture of about 460 kilometers (290 miles) of the Sagaing fault that runs through most of Myanmar. At the time a House Security Camera was recording outside when the earthquake hit Thazi, The video shows the ground shaking and two pieces of land move away from each other. This is the first time a Fault Rupture has been caught on camera

Earthquake footage near Thazi
