= Aung Thu =

Aung Thu is a Burmese name which may refer to:

- Aung Thu (MP) (born 1966), Burmese politician
- Aung Thu (activist) (born 1968), Burmese member of the 88 Generation Student Group
- Aung Thu (footballer) (born 1996), Burmese striker
- Aung Thu (minister) (born 1955), Burmese cabinet minister
- Aung Thu (volleyball) (born 1993), Burmese volleyball player
