= Mizzima News =

Burmese multimedia news organisation

Mizzima
- Editor: Soe Myint
- Categories: Online news
- Founder: Soe Myint; Thin Thin Aung
- Founded: 1998; 28 years ago
- Country: Yangon, Myanmar
- Based in: Pazundaung Township, Yangon
- Language: English, Burmese
- Website: www.mizzima.com

Mizzima News (Burmese: မဇ္ဈိမသတင်း, romanized: Ma.jjhi.ma.) is a Burmese multimedia news organisation. A member of the Burma News International coalition, Mizzima was founded in exile in 1998 amid the pro-democracy movement. The outlet later established a bureau inside Myanmar in the 2010s as the country's military regime transitioned toward semi-democratic governance. Having spent years operating from abroad, Mizzima returned home during the reform era but was once again driven underground after the 2021 Myanmar coup d'état, continuing its work despite renewed repression.

== Organisation ==
It produces a daily digital Mizzima newspaper in Burmese language, a weekly Mizzima business magazine, weekly television programs – aired by Myanma Radio & Television (MRTV) – and websites in both the Burmese and English languages.

== History ==
Mizzima News was established in August 1998 in New Delhi, India, by a group of Burmese journalists living in exile. Its co-founders, Soe Myint and Thin Thin Aung, were veterans of the 1988 pro-democracy uprising who had fled the subsequent military crackdown. The name "Mizzima" is derived from the Pali word for "middle" or "moderate". For nearly 15 years, Mizzima operated from exile, with offices in India and later a liaison office in Chiang Mai, Thailand, becoming a vital link for information flowing out of the otherwise isolated nation.

After political and economic reforms, Mizzima became the first exiled media organization to officially register and open an office in Yangon. During this period of semi-democratic rule, the outlet expanded significantly, launching a daily digital newspaper in Burmese, a weekly business magazine in English, and producing television programs broadcast on the state-run MRTV.

After the 2021 Myanmar coup d'état, military junta revoked the operating licenses of Mizzima, and four other media outlets, namely Myanmar Now, Democratic Voice of Burma (DVB), Khit Thit Media, and 7Day News, amidst the ongoing protests. The organization's offices in Yangon were raided, and some of its staff were arrested. The co-founder Thin Thin Aung was arrested on 8 April 2021. The junta charged her under Section 505(a) of the Penal Code for "causing fear" and "spreading false news," charges widely regarded as politically motivated to silence dissent.

Mizzima had to stop working in public, so it went back to being an underground and exile-based media outlet. The organization's leaders, including Soe Myint, showed amazing strength by leaving Yangon and setting up shop again in border areas and outside the country.

== Awards ==
The International Press Institute awarded Mizzima News its Free Media Pioneer award in 2007.
