= Tesu (village) =

Tesu တဲစု
- Village
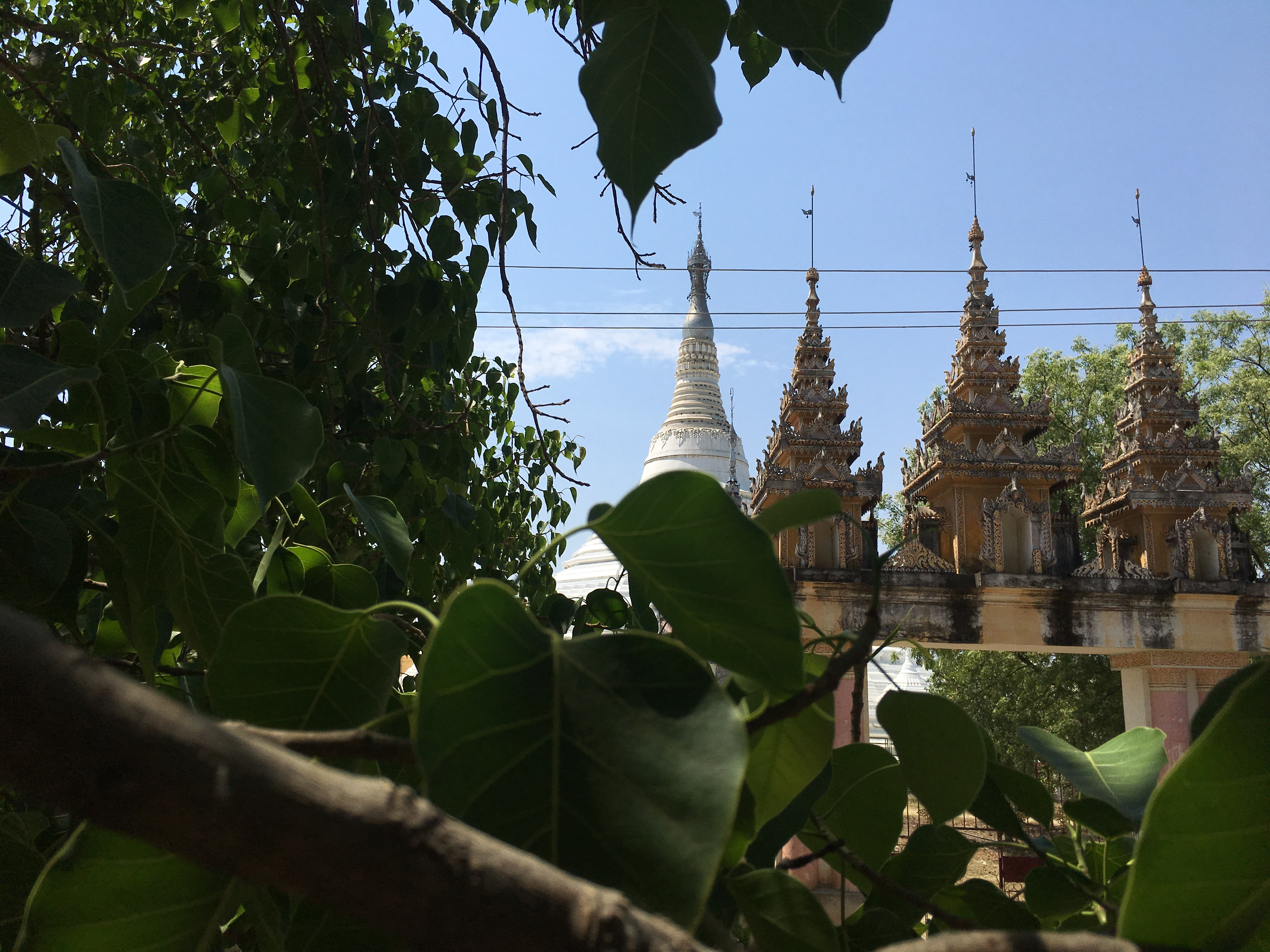
- Myamyinzu Pagoda

- Location within Myanmar
- Coordinates: 21°08′27″N 95°51′13″E
- Country: Burma
- Division: Mandalay Division
- District: Meiktila District
- Township: Wundwin Township
- Village: Tesu
- Time zone: UTC+6:30 (MMT)

Tesu is a village in the Wundwin Township, Mandalay Division of central Myanmar.
