= Thin Thin Aung =

Human rights defender from Myanmar

- သင်းသင်းအောင်
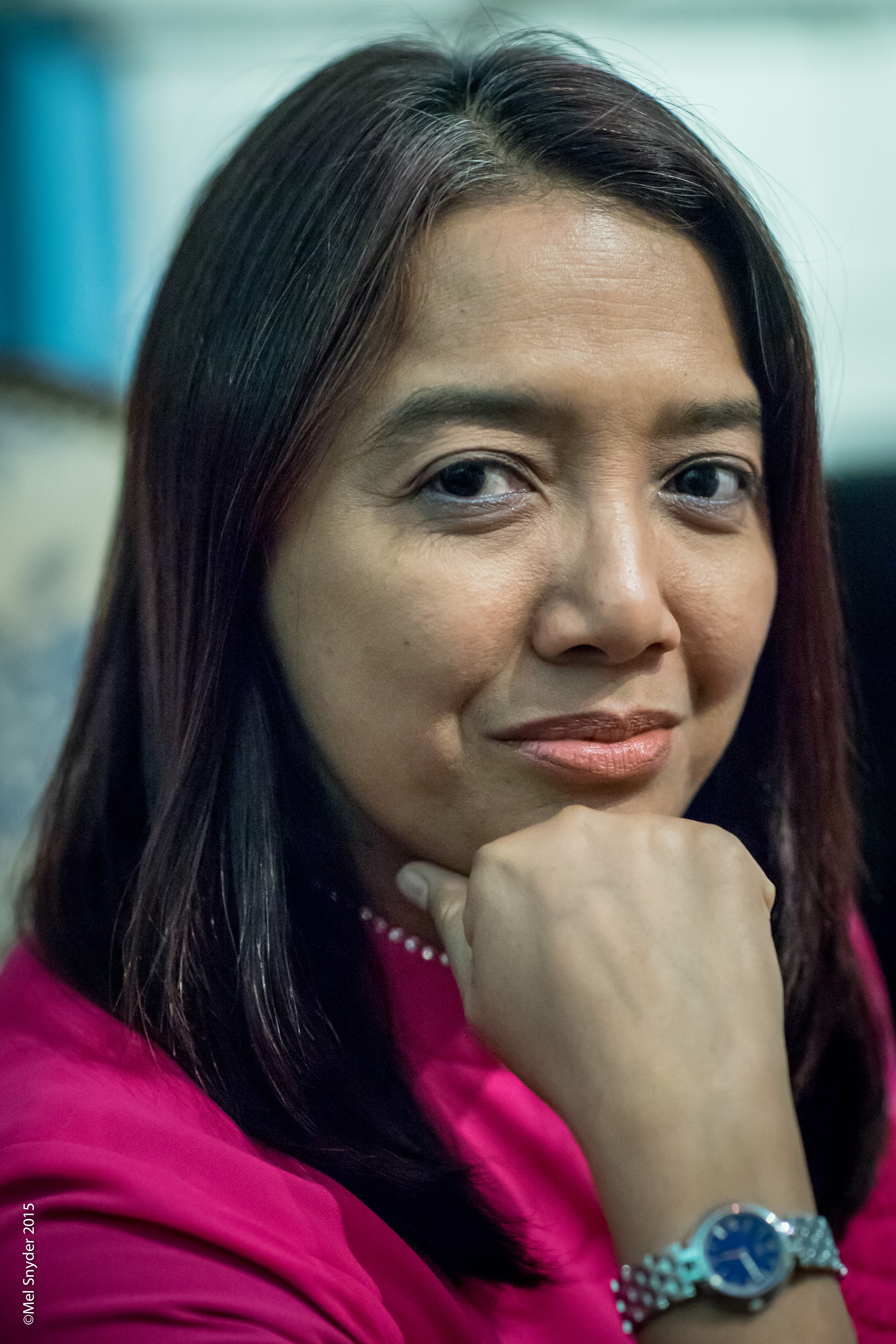
- Thin Thin Aung in 2015
- Occupations: Human rights activist; journalist
- Years active: 1988–present
- Organizations: Women for Justice; Women's League of Burma; Mizzima News

Thin Thin Aung (Burmese: သင်းသင်းအောင်) is a Burmese human rights defender, democracy activist, and co-founder of the Mizzima News Agency and the Women's League of Burma (WLB).

== Activism ==
Thin Thin Aung was a student when the nationwide 1988 Uprising against the military junta broke out in Burma, during which she became involved in politics. After the protests were violently put down, she had to leave Myanmar to avoid being punished. She spent the next 23 years in exile, mostly in India, where she kept fighting for a democratic Burma.

During her time in exile, she co-founded the Women's League of Burma (WLB), an umbrella organization composed of 13 women's groups from various ethnic backgrounds in Myanmar. The WLB has been instrumental in advocating for the rights of women, particularly those affected by armed conflict, and has consistently called for their inclusion in the national peace process. She also co-founded the Women for Justice (formerly the Women's Rights and Welfare Association of Burma) to support women refugees and children affected by the conflict. She worked as a journalist with the BBC in 1998.

In 2010, she helped organize the International Tribunal on Crimes Against Women of Burma, which was put on by the Women's League of Burma and the Nobel Women's Initiative.

Thin Thin Aung returned to Myanmar in 2012 amid a period of political reforms and regained her Myanmar citizenship. She continued her activism, focusing on police reform and civil society development. She is also a co-founder of Mizzima News Agency, an independent media outlet that has played a crucial role in providing uncensored news and information in a country with a long history of media suppression.

Following the 2021 Myanmar coup d'état, the military junta began a systematic crackdown on activists, journalists, and political opponents. Thin Thin Aung was arrested on April 8, 2021. The junta charged her under Section 505(a) of the Penal Code for "causing fear" and "spreading false news," charges widely seen as politically motivated to silence dissent. Her apartment was subsequently raided on 9 April 2021 and computers and personal belongings were seized. As soon as she was arrested, international groups like Amnesty International spoke out against it and called for her immediate release. They also expressed concern for her health while she was in jail. A public joint statement from five Nobel Peace Laureates on 27 May 2021 called for her immediate release and for all charges against her to be dropped. She released from Insein Prison in Yangon on 19 October 2021, as part of a wider amnesty.

== See also ==
- Women's League of Burma
- Mizzima News
- Human rights in Myanmar
- 2021 Myanmar coup d'état
