= Khin Maung Win (politician, born 1955) =

Burmese politician

Dr Khin Maung Win

Member of the Amyotha Hluttaw
- Incumbent
- Assumed office 1 February 2016
- Constituency: Tanintharyi No.11
- Majority: 28,264 votes

Personal details
- Born: 23 May 1955 (age 71) Danubyu, Myanmar
- Party: National League for Democracy
- Spouse: Aye Thidar
- Parent: Saw Myint (mother)
- Education: University of Medicine, Yangon

Khin Maung Win (Burmese: ခင်မောင်ဝင်း, born 25 May 1955) is a Burmese politician who currently serves as a House of Nationalities member of parliament for Tanintharyi No. 11. He is a member of National League for Democracy.

== Early life and education ==
Win was born on 23 May 1955 in Danubyu, Myanmar. He graduated M.B.B.S from University of Medicine, Yangon. His previous job is Medical Doctor.

== Political career ==
Win was elected as a Tanintharyi Region MP, winning a majority of 28,264 votes, from Tanintharyi Region No. 11 parliamentary constituency. He also serves as a member of Amyotha Hluttaw Ethnic Affairs Committee.
