= Mahlaing Township =

Township in Mandalay Division, Burma

Mahlaing Township မလှိုင်မြို့နယ် Phanlaing
- Township
- Location in Meiktila district

- Location within Myanmar
- Coordinates: 21°6′N 95°39′E
- Country: Burma
- Division: Mandalay Division
- District: Meiktila District
- Capital: Mahlaing
- Postal Code: 05201
- Time zone: UTC+6:30 (MMT)

Ma Hlaing Township is a township of Meiktila District in the Mandalay Division of Burma.
