= Thazi Township =

- Township
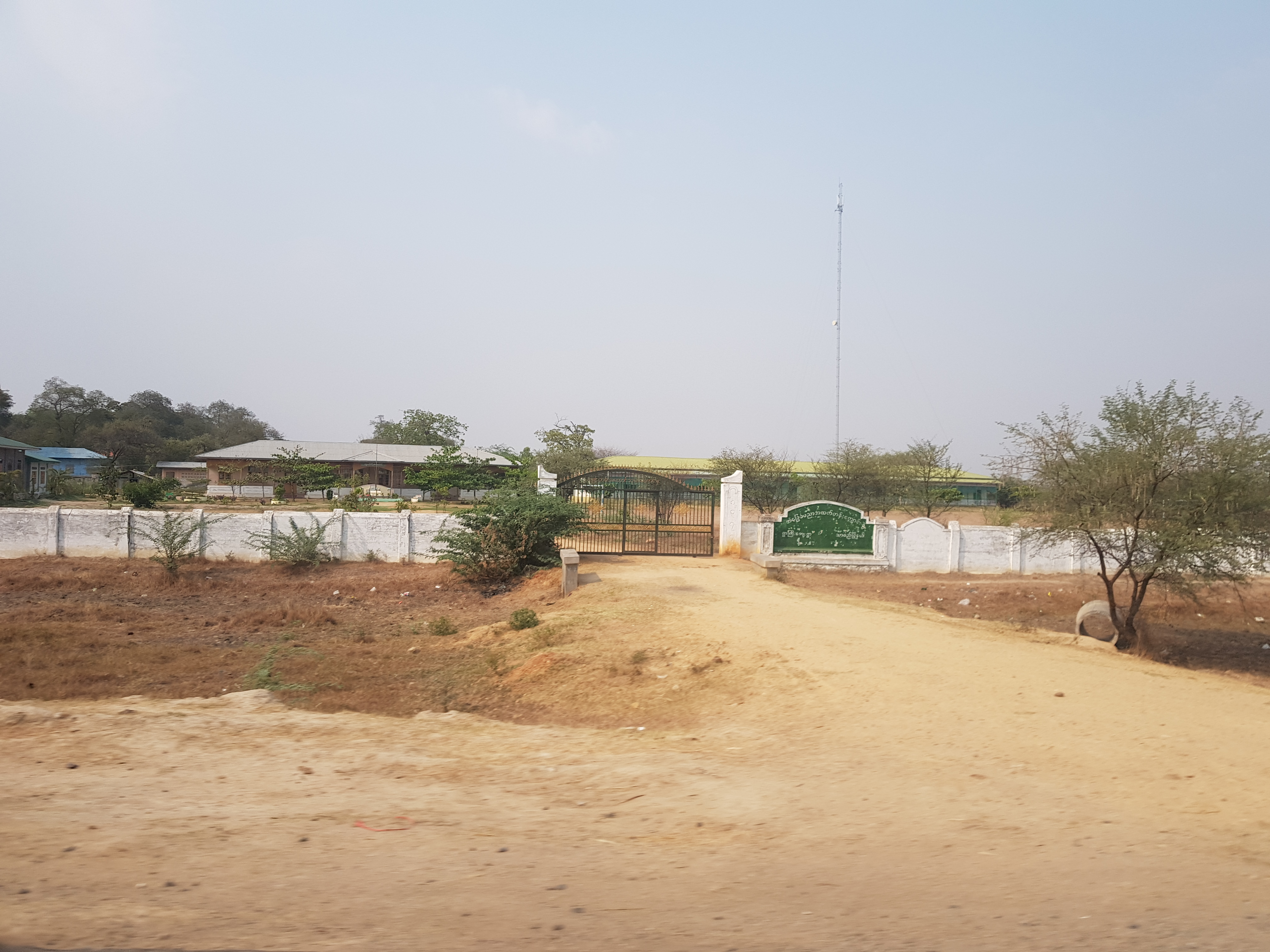

- Location in Meiktila district

- Location within Myanmar
- Coordinates: 21°50′N 95°39′E
- Country: Myanmar
- Division: Mandalay Region
- District: Meiktila District
- Capital: Thazi
- Time zone: UTC+6:30 (MMT)

Thazi Township (သာစည်မြို့နယ်) is a township of Meiktila District in the Mandalay Region of Burma.
