= Wundwin =

- Town
- Location in Burma
- Coordinates: 21°5′N 96°2′E
- Country: Myanmar
- Region: Mandalay Region
- District: Meiktila District
- Township: Wundwin Township

Population (2005)
  - Religions: Buddhism
- Time zone: UTC+6.30 (MST)

Wundwin (Burmese: ဝမ်းတွင်းမြို့) is a town in the Mandalay Region of central Myanmar.

Wundwin, alongside Amarapura, is a major domestic center of traditional acheik weaving, although in recent years, cheaper factory-produced imitations from China and India have significantly disrupted Myanmar's traditional cottage industry.
