= Villages of Myanmar =

Administrative Division of Myanmar

A village (Burmese: ကျေးရွာ, kyei-ywa; or ရွာ, ywa) is the smallest subdivision of Myanmar's rural village tracts. As of August 2019, there are 63,214 villages in Myanmar.

The village functions as the most fundamental unit for rural Myanmar. Villages were legally established by the 1907 Burma Act No. 6 and is, today, administered in accordance with the 2012 Ward Or Village Tract Administration Law. According to the Ward or Village Tract Administration Law, village heads are responsible for advising and assisting the relevant village tract administrator, who is the primary local governance administrator.

Elections are held at the village tract level, and the village tract is the main body administrating between the state or region and the village. The villages themselves vary in size and a village tract can have between three and eleven villages.

== See also ==
- Administrative divisions of Myanmar
