= Wundwin Township =

Wundwin Township ဝမ်းတွင်းမြို့နယ်
- Township
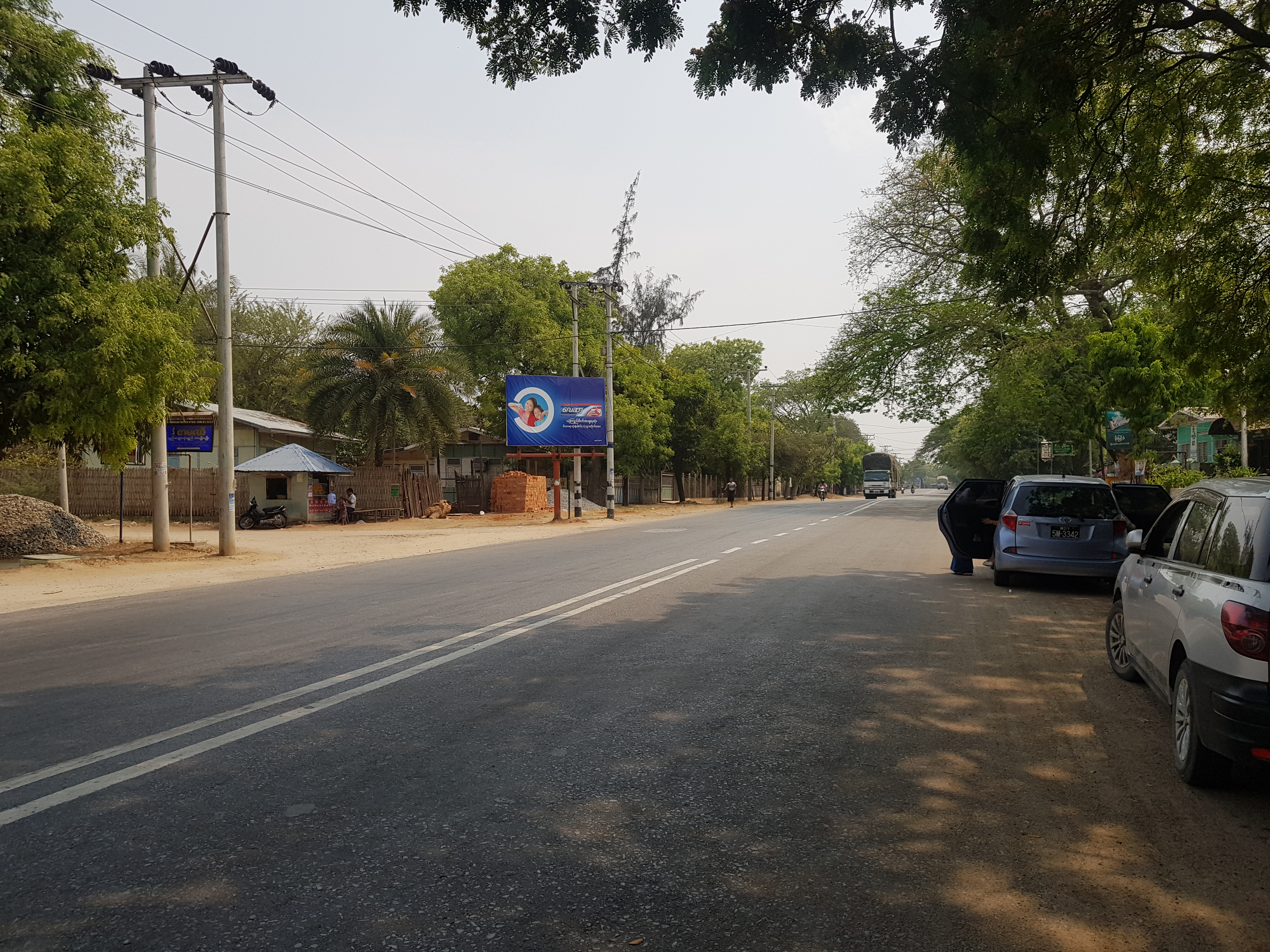

- Location in Meiktila district

- Location within Myanmar
- Coordinates: 21°5′N 96°2′E
- Country: Burma
- Division: Mandalay Division
- District: Meiktila District
- Capital: Wundwin
- Time zone: UTC+6:30 (MMT)

Wundwin (ဝမ်းတွင်း) is a township of Meiktila District in the Mandalay Division of Burma.

== See also ==
- List of villages in Wundwin Township
