= Meiktila District =

Meiktila District မိတ္ထီလာ ခရိုင်
- District of Mandalay Division
- Meiktila District
- Location of Meiktila district in Mandalay region

- Location in Burma
- Coordinates: 21°0′0″N 96°0′0″E
- Country: Myanmar
- Division: Mandalay
- Time zone: UTC6:30 (MST)

Meiktila District is a district of the Mandalay Division in central Burma.

== Townships ==
The district consists of the following townships:

- Mahlaing Township
- Meiktila Township
- Thazi Township
- Wundwin Township
