= Downregulation and upregulation =

Biological processes

In biochemistry, in the biological context of organisms' regulation of gene expression and production of gene products, downregulation is the process by which a cell decreases the production and quantities of its cellular components, such as RNA and proteins, in response to an external stimulus. The complementary process that involves increase in quantities of cellular components is called upregulation.

An example of downregulation is the cellular decrease in the expression of a specific receptor in response to its increased activation by a molecule, such as a hormone or neurotransmitter, which reduces the cell's sensitivity to the molecule. This is an example of a locally acting (negative feedback) mechanism.

An example of upregulation is the response of liver cells exposed to such xenobiotic molecules as dioxin. In this situation, the cells increase their production of cytochrome P450 enzymes, which in turn increases degradation of these dioxin molecules.

Downregulation or upregulation of an RNA or protein may also arise by an epigenetic alteration. Such an epigenetic alteration can cause expression of the RNA or protein to no longer respond to an external stimulus. This occurs, for instance, during drug addiction or progression to cancer.

== Downregulation and upregulation of receptors ==
All living cells have the ability to receive and process signals that originate outside their membranes, which they do by means of proteins called receptors, often located at the cell's surface imbedded in the plasma membrane. When such signals interact with a receptor, they effectively direct the cell to do something, such as dividing, dying, or allowing substances to be created, or to enter or exit the cell. A cell's ability to respond to a chemical message depends on the presence of receptors tuned to that message. The more receptors a cell has that are tuned to the message, the more the cell will respond to it.

Receptors are created, or expressed, from instructions in the DNA of the cell, and they can be increased, or upregulated, when the signal is weak, or decreased, or downregulated, when it is strong. Their level can also be up or down regulated by modulation of systems that degrade receptors when they are no longer required by the cell.

Downregulation of receptors can also occur when receptors have been chronically exposed to an excessive amount of a ligand, either from endogenous mediators or from exogenous drugs. This results in ligand-induced desensitization or internalization of that receptor. This is typically seen in animal hormone receptors. Upregulation of receptors, on the other hand, can result in super-sensitized cells, especially after repeated exposure to an antagonistic drug or prolonged absence of the ligand.

Some receptor agonists may cause downregulation of their respective receptors, while most receptor antagonists temporarily upregulate their respective receptors. The disequilibrium caused by these changes often causes withdrawal when the long-term use of a drug is discontinued.

Upregulation and downregulation can also happen as a response to toxins or hormones. An example of upregulation in pregnancy is hormones that cause cells in the uterus to become more sensitive to oxytocin.

== Example: Insulin receptor downregulation ==
Elevated levels of the hormone insulin in the blood trigger downregulation of the associated receptors. When insulin binds to its receptors on the surface of a cell, the hormone receptor complex undergoes endocytosis and is subsequently attacked by intracellular lysosomal enzymes. The internalization of the insulin molecules provides a pathway for degradation of the hormone, as well as for regulation of the number of sites that are available for binding on the cell surface. At high plasma concentrations, the number of surface receptors for insulin is gradually reduced by the accelerated rate of receptor internalization and degradation brought about by increased hormonal binding. The rate of synthesis of new receptors within the endoplasmic reticulum and their insertion in the plasma membrane do not keep pace with their rate of destruction. Over time, this self-induced loss of target cell receptors for insulin reduces the target cell's sensitivity to the elevated hormone concentration.

This process is illustrated by the insulin receptor sites on target cells, e.g. liver cells, in a person with type 2 diabetes. Due to the elevated levels of blood glucose in an individual, the β-cells (islets of Langerhans) in the pancreas must release more insulin than normal to meet the demand and return the blood to homeostatic levels. The near-constant increase in blood insulin levels results from an effort to match the increase in blood glucose, which will cause receptor sites on the liver cells to downregulate and decrease the number of receptors for insulin, increasing the subject's resistance by decreasing sensitivity to this hormone. There is also a hepatic decrease in sensitivity to insulin. This can be seen in the continuing gluconeogenesis in the liver even when blood glucose levels are elevated. This is the more common process of insulin resistance, which leads to adult-onset diabetes.

Another example can be seen in diabetes insipidus, in which the kidneys become insensitive to arginine vasopressin.

== Drug addiction ==
Family-based, adoption, and twin studies have indicated that there is a strong (50%) heritable component to vulnerability to substance abuse addiction.

Especially among genetically vulnerable individuals, repeated exposure to a drug of abuse in adolescence or adulthood causes addiction by inducing stable downregulation or upregulation in expression of specific genes and microRNAs through epigenetic alterations. Such downregulation or upregulation has been shown to occur in the brain's reward regions, such as the nucleus accumbens.

== Cancer ==
DNA damage appears to be the primary underlying cause of cancer. DNA damage can also increase epigenetic alterations due to errors during DNA repair. Such mutations and epigenetic alterations can give rise to cancer (see malignant neoplasms). Investigation of epigenetic down- or upregulation of repaired DNA genes as possibly central to progression of cancer has been regularly undertaken since 2000.

Epigenetic downregulation of the DNA repair gene MGMT occurs in 93% of bladder cancers, 88% of stomach cancers, 74% of thyroid cancers, 40–90% of colorectal cancers, and 50% of brain cancers. Similarly, epigenetic downregulation of LIG4 occurs in 82% of colorectal cancers and epigenetic downregulation of NEIL1 occurs in 62% of head and neck cancers and in 42% of non-small-cell lung cancers.

Epigenetic upregulation of the DNA repair genes PARP1 and FEN1 occurs in numerous cancers (see Regulation of transcription in cancer). PARP1 and FEN1 are essential genes in the error-prone and mutagenic DNA repair pathway microhomology-mediated end joining. If this pathway is upregulated, the excess mutations it causes can lead to cancer. PARP1 is over-expressed in tyrosine kinase-activated leukemias, in neuroblastoma, in testicular and other germ cell tumors, and in Ewing's sarcoma. FEN1 is upregulated in the majority of cancers of the breast, prostate, stomach, neuroblastomas, pancreas, and lung.

== See also ==
- Regulation of gene expression
- Transcriptional regulation
- Enhancer (genetics)
