= Bomb pulse =

Sudden increase of carbon-14 in the Earth's atmosphere due to nuclear bomb tests

Atmospheric ^{14}C, New Zealand and Austria. The New Zealand curve is representative for the Southern Hemisphere, the Austrian curve is representative for the Northern Hemisphere. Atmospheric nuclear tests almost doubled the concentration of ^{14}C in the Northern Hemisphere.

The bomb pulse is the sudden increase of carbon-14 (^{14}C) in Earth's atmosphere due to the hundreds of above-ground nuclear tests that started in 1945 and intensified after 1950 until 1963, when the Limited Test Ban Treaty was signed by the United States, the Soviet Union and the United Kingdom. These blasts were followed by an almost doubling of the relative concentration of ^{14}C in the atmosphere.

Measurements of ^{14}C levels by mass spectrometers are most accurately made by comparison to another carbon isotope, often the common isotope ^{12}C. The figure shows how the relative concentration of ^{14}C in the atmosphere, of order only 1 part per 10^{12}, changed following the first bomb test in 1945. The increase in atmospheric ^{12}C since 1955 has reduced the relative concentration of ^{14}C to pre-1955 values, even though the absolute ^{14}C concentration remains elevated.

^{14}C is naturally produced in trace amounts in the atmosphere and can be detected in all living things. Carbon of all types is continually used to form the molecules of the cells of organisms. Doubling of the concentration of ^{14}C in the atmosphere is reflected in the tissues and cells of all organisms that lived around the period of nuclear testing. This property has many applications in biology and forensics.

== Background ==
^{14}C is constantly formed from nitrogen-14 (^{14}N) in the upper atmosphere by cosmic rays which generate neutrons. These neutrons hit ^{14}N to produce ^{14}C which then combines with oxygen to form ^{14}CO_{2}. This radioactive CO_{2} spreads through the lower atmosphere and the oceans where it is absorbed by plants, and animals that eat the plants. ^{14}C thus becomes part of the biosphere, so all living things contain some ^{14}C. Nuclear tests caused a rapid increase in atmospheric ^{14}C (see figure), since a nuclear explosion also creates neutrons which collide with ^{14}N and produce ^{14}C. Since the nuclear test ban in 1963, atmospheric ^{14}C relative concentration has been decreasing at 4% per year. This continuous decrease permits scientists to determine, among other things, the age of deceased people and allows them to study cell activity in tissues. By measuring the amount of ^{14}C in a population of cells and comparing that to the amount of ^{14}C in the atmosphere during or after the bomb pulse, scientists can estimate when the cells were created and how often they have turned over since then.

== Difference with classical radiocarbon dating ==
Carbon dating has been used since 1946 to determine the age of organic material as old as 50,000 years. When an organism dies, the exchange of ^{14}C with the environment ends and the incorporated ^{14}C decays. Given radioactive decay (^{14}C's half-life is about 5,730 years), the relative amount of ^{14}C left in the dead organism can be used to calculate how long ago it died. Bomb pulse dating should be considered a special form of carbon dating. In bomb pulse dating the slow absorption of atmospheric ^{14}C by the biosphere can be considered a chronometer. Starting from the pulse around the year 1963 (see figure), atmospheric radiocarbon relative abundance decreased by about 4% a year. So in bomb pulse dating it is the relative amount of ^{14}C in the atmosphere that is decreasing and not the amount of ^{14}C in dead organisms, as is the case in classical carbon dating. This decrease in atmospheric ^{14}C can be measured in cells and tissues and has permitted scientists to determine the age of individual cells and of deceased people. These applications are very similar to the experiments conducted with pulse-chase analysis in which cellular processes are examined over time by exposing the cells to a labeled compound (pulse) and then to the same compound in an unlabeled form (chase). Radioactivity is a commonly used label in these experiments. An important difference between pulse-chase analysis and bomb-pulse dating is the absence of the chase in the latter.

Around the year 2030 the bomb pulse will die out if no more nuclear weapons are detonated aboveground. Every organism born after this will not bear detectable bomb pulse traces and their cells cannot be dated in this way. Radioactive pulses are generally not administered to people just to study the turnover of their cells for ethical reasons, so the bomb pulse results are a useful side effect of nuclear testing.

== Applications ==
The fact that cells and tissues reflect the doubling of ^{14}C in the atmosphere during and after nuclear testing, has been of great use for several biological studies, for forensics and even for the determination of the year in which certain wine was produced.

=== Biology ===
Biological studies carried out by Kirsty Spalding demonstrated that neuronal cells in some brain regions are essentially static and do not regenerate during life, while other regions show higher rates of neurogenesis . She also showed that the number of fat cells is set during childhood and adolescence. Considering the amount of ^{14}C present in DNA she could establish that 10% of fat cells are renewed annually. The radiocarbon bomb pulse has been used to validate otolith annuli (ages scored from otolith sections) across several fish species including the freshwater drum, lake sturgeon, pallid sturgeon, bigmouth buffalo, arctic salmonids, Pristipomoides filamentosus, several reef fishes, among numerous other validated freshwater and marine species. The precision for bomb radiocarbon age validation is typically within ±2 years because the rise period (1956–1960) is so steep. The bomb pulse has also been used to estimate the age of Greenland sharks by measuring the incorporation of ^{14}C in the eye lens during development. After determining the age and measuring the length of sharks born around the bomb pulse, scientists calculated the correlation between length and age of the sharks to estimate the age of the larger sharks. The study showed that the Greenland shark, with an age of 392 ± 120 years, is the oldest known vertebrate.

=== Forensics ===
At the moment of death, carbon uptake ends. Considering that tissue that contained the bomb pulse ^{14}C was rapidly diminishing with a rate of 4% per year, it has been possible to establish the time of death of two women in a court case by examining tissues with a rapid turnover. Another important application has been the identification of victims of the Southeast Asian tsunami 2004 by examining their teeth.

=== Carbon transport modeling ===
The perturbation in atmospheric ^{14}C from the bomb testing was an opportunity to validate atmospheric transport models, and to study the movement of carbon between the atmosphere and oceanic or terrestrial sinks.

=== Other applications ===
Atmospheric bomb ^{14}C has been used to validate tree ring ages and to date recent trees that have no annual growth rings. It can also be used to obtain the growth rate of tropical trees and palms that have no visible annual rings.

== Deaths and injuries from low-dose radiation ==
Many scientists have attempted to quantify the long-term health impacts of the increased ^{14}C content in the atmosphere, and subsequently in the biosphere and human tissue, where it causes damage via beta decay. This is estimated to continue affecting humans for a timespan on the order of 8,000 years, due to ^{14}C's half-life of around 5,700 years. In a June 1958 publication, Soviet nuclear weapon physicist Andrei Sakharov estimated about 10,000 people would ultimately suffer cancers, genetic disorders, and other ill effects, with 6,600 people dying, from the ^{14}C alone produced by a 1 megaton nuclear explosion in the atmosphere. US scientist Linus Pauling made a similar estimate. In 1990, American physicist Frank N. von Hippel published a commentary on Sakharov's estimates, concluding with different population and dose-effect coefficients values roughly in agreement. He also noted that all other nuclear explosion-produced isotopes, including fission products, would only increase the injury and death numbers by about 20%, due to the smaller world that the shorter-lived isotopes affect. At an approximated final value of 545 megatons of atmospheric nuclear testing, with the assumption of a mean global population of 30 billion, in the next 8,000 years around 6.5 million people may be expected to develop ill effects from nuclear testing, and 2.9 million of these may be expected to die from their cancers.

== See also ==
- Effects of nuclear explosions
- Pulse-chase analysis
- Suess effect
- Miyake event
- Low-background steel
