= Microsome =

Cellular debris

In cell biology, microsomes are heterogeneous vesicle-like artifacts (~20-200 nm diameter) re-formed from pieces of the endoplasmic reticulum (ER) when eukaryotic cells are broken-up in the laboratory; microsomes are not present in healthy, living cells.

Rough (containing ribosomes) and smooth (without ribosomes) microsomes are made from the endoplasmic reticulum through cell disruption. These microsomes have an inside that is exactly the same as the endoplasmic reticulum lumen. Both forms of microsomes can be purified by a process known as equilibrium density centrifugation. Rough and smooth microsomes do differ in their proteins and rough microsomes have shown occurrence of translation and translocation at the same time besides certain exceptions from proteins in yeast.

== Signal hypothesis ==
The Signal Hypothesis was postulated by Günter Blobel and David Sabatini in 1971, stating that a unique peptide sequence is encoded by mRNA specific for proteins destined for translocation across the ER membrane. This peptide signal directs the active ribosome to the membrane surface and creates the conditions for transfer of the nascent polypeptide across the membrane. The generalization of the Signal Hypothesis to include signals for every organelle and location within the cell had an impact far beyond illuminating the targeting of secretory proteins, as it introduced the concept of 'topogenic' signals for the first time. Before the Signal Hypothesis, it was almost inconceivable that information encoded in the polypeptide chain could determine the localization of proteins in the cell.

== Cell-free protein synthesis ==
This relates to cell-free protein synthesis. Cell-free protein synthesis that is without microsomes has no way for incorporation into the microsomes to happen. This means that when microsomal membranes are presented later there isn't the removal of the signal sequence. With microsomes there, cell-free protein synthesis demonstrates cotranslational transport of the protein into the microsome and therefore the removal of the signal sequence. This process produces a mature protein chain. Studies have looked into the cell-free protein synthesis process when microsomes have their bound ribosomes stripped away from them. This explained certain details about endoplasmic reticulum signal sequences. Normally, a secretory protein only has its signal sequence removed if the microsomes are there for protein synthesis due to the secretory protein being incorporated into the microsomes. Protein transport doesn't happen if there is a late addition of microsomes after the completion of the protein synthesis process.

Protein extrusion into a microsome can be described by multiple factors. A protein has been extruded if it is resistant to proteases, is not resistant to proteases when detergents are present, or is glycosylated by enzymes residing in the microsomes. Additionally, another sign that a protein has been extruded is signal peptidase cleaving off the N-terminal signal peptide inside the microsome that may cause the protein to be smaller in size.

== Pulse-Chase experiments ==
Microsomes also play a part in the Pulse-Chase experiments. The Pulse-Chase experiments showed that secreted proteins move across the endoplasmic reticulum membrane when the membranes are purified. It was important to take the endoplasmic reticulum away from the rest of the cell to look into translocation but this isn't possible due to how delicate and interconnected it is. This allowed microsomes to come into play as they have the majority of the biochemical properties of the endoplasmic reticulum. The microsomes are formed through homogenizing the cells and small closed vesicles with ribosomes outside being formed from rough endoplasmic reticulum breakdown. When microsomes were treated with protease, it was found that the polypeptide made by ribosomes ended in the microsomal lumen. This takes place even though the proteins are made on the cytosolic face of the endoplasmic reticulum membrane.

Other experiments have shown that microsomes have to be introduced before about the first 70 amino acids are translated for the secretory protein to go into the microsomal lumen. At this point, 40 amino acids are sticking out from the ribosome and the 30 amino acids after that are in the ribosomal channel. Cotranslational translocation explains that transport into the endoplasmic reticulum lumen of secretory proteins starts with the protein still bound to the ribosomes and not completely synthesized. Microsomes can be concentrated and separated from other cellular debris by differential centrifugation. Unbroken cells, nuclei, and mitochondria sediment out at 10,000 g (where g is the Earth's gravitational acceleration), whereas soluble enzymes and fragmented ER, which contains cytochrome P450 (CYP), remain in solution. At 100,000 g, achieved by faster centrifuge rotation, ER sediments out of solution as a pellet but the soluble enzymes remain in the supernatant. In this way, cytochrome P450 in microsomes is concentrated and isolated. Microsomes have a reddish-brown color, due to the presence of the heme. Because of the need for a multi-part protein-system, microsomes are necessary to analyze the metabolic activity of CYPs. These CYPs are highly abundant in livers of rats, mice and humans, but present in all other organs and organisms as well.

To get microsomes containing a specific CYP or for high amounts of active enzyme, microsomes are prepared from Sf9 insect cells or in yeast via heterologous expression. Alternatively expression in Escherichia coli of whole or truncated proteins can also be performed. Therefore, microsomes are a valuable tool for investigating the metabolism of compounds (enzyme inhibition, clearance and metabolite identification) and for examining drug-drug interactions by in vitro-research. Researchers often select microsome lots based on the enzyme activity level of specific CYPs. Some lots are available to study specific populations (for example, lung microsomes from smokers or non-smokers) or divided into classifications to meet target CYP activity levels for inhibition and metabolism studies.

Microsomes are used to mimic the activity of the endoplasmic reticulum in a test tube and conduct experiments that require protein synthesis on a membrane. They provide a way for scientists to figure out how proteins are being made on the ER in a cell by reconstituting the process in a test tube.

Keefer et al. looked into how human liver microsomes and human hepatocytes are used to study metabolic stability and inhibition for in vitro systems. Going into their similarities and differences can shine light on the mechanisms of metabolism, passive permeability, and transporters. It was shown that passive permeability is important in metabolism and enzyme inhibition in human hepatocytes. Also, P-gp efflux has a smaller role in this same area. Also, liver microsomes are more predictive than hepatocytes of in vivo clearance when they give higher intrinsic clearance than the hepatocytes.

== MTP ==
Iqbal, Jahangir, and Al-Qarni studied the microsomal triglyceride transfer protein (MTP). MTP is an endoplasmic reticulum resident protein and assists in transferring neutral lipids to nascent apolipoprotein B. MTP has a large use for abetalipoproteinemia patients with MTP mutations because of how it affects the assembly and secretion of apoB-containing lipoproteins. These MTP mutations are linked with not having circulation of the apoB-containing lipoproteins. MTP is also involved with cholesterol ester and cluster of differentiation 1d biosynthesis. Transferring sphingolipids to apoB-containing lipoproteins also falls under the ability of MTP. MTP works with the homeostasis of lipids and lipoproteins and is related to certain pathophysiological conditions and metabolic diseases.

Wang et al. explored drug metabolism in vitro using human liver microsomes and human liver S9 fractions. The study found significant differences between human liver microsomes and human liver S9 fractions in drug-metabolizing enzyme and transporter protein concentrations. The protein-protein correlations of these drug-metabolizing enzymes and transporters was determined relating to the two hepatic preparations.

== See also ==
- Cytochrome P450
- List of biological development disorders
- S9 fraction
- Cell-free protein synthesis
- Pulse-Chase experiments
- Differential Centrifugation
- Microsomal Triglyceride Transfer Protein
