= Nagoya University =

National university in Japan

- 名古屋大学
- Motto: 勇気ある知識人 (courageous intellectual)
- Type: Public (national)
- Established: 1871; 155 years ago (Chartered 1939)
- President: Naoshi Sugiyama
- Faculty: 3,847 (2020)
- Undergraduates: 9,585 (2020)
- Postgraduates: 6,187 (2020)
- Location: Nagoya, Aichi, Japan; 35°09′17″N 136°58′01″E
- Campus: Urban, 3.2 km²
- Colors: Pine Green
- Website: en.nagoya-u.ac.jp

Nagoya University (名古屋大学, Nagoya daigaku), abbreviated to Meidai (名大) or NU, is a Japanese national research university located in Chikusa-ku, Nagoya.

It was established in 1939 as the last of the nine Imperial Universities in the then Empire of Japan, and is now a Designated National University.

The university is the birthplace of the Sakata School of physics and the Hirata School of chemistry. As of 2021, seven Nobel Prize winners have been associated with Nagoya University, the third most in Japan and Asia behind Kyoto University and the University of Tokyo.

== History ==
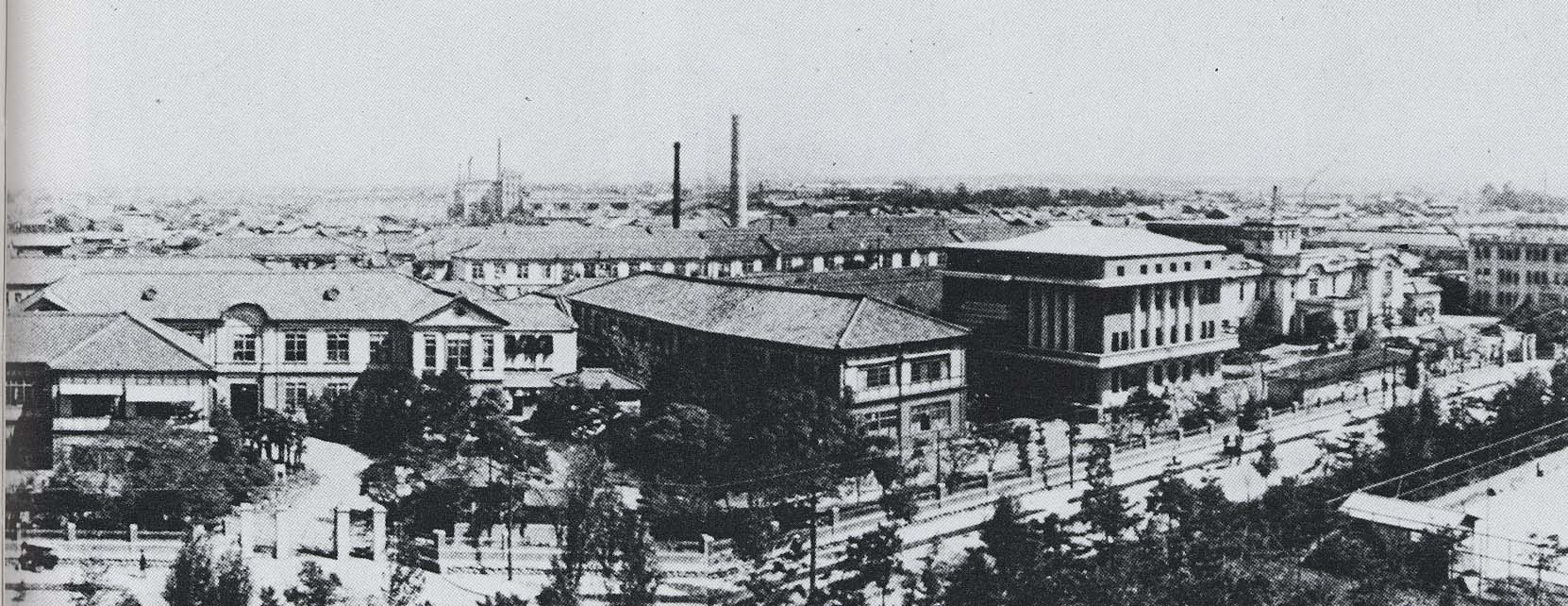
Nagoya Imperial University, one of the Imperial Universities

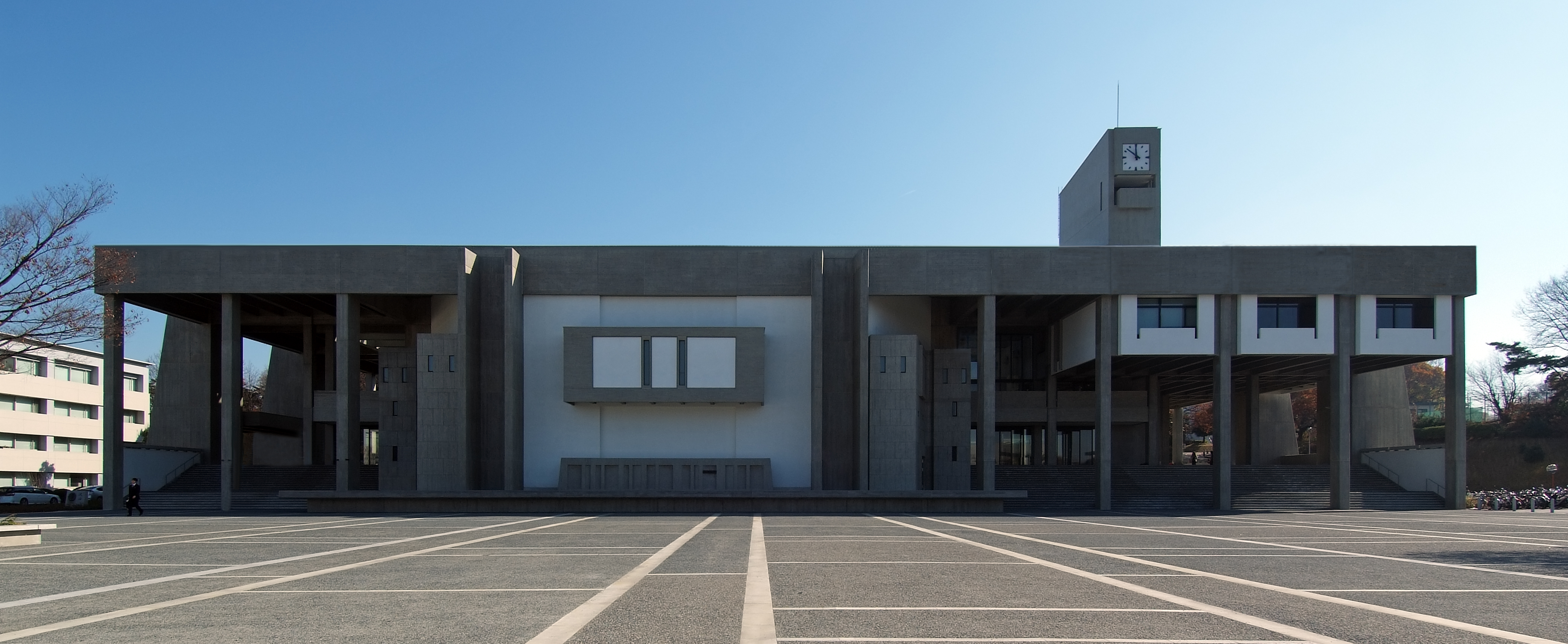
Toyoda Auditorium, the landmark of Nagoya University, designed by Fumihiko Maki.

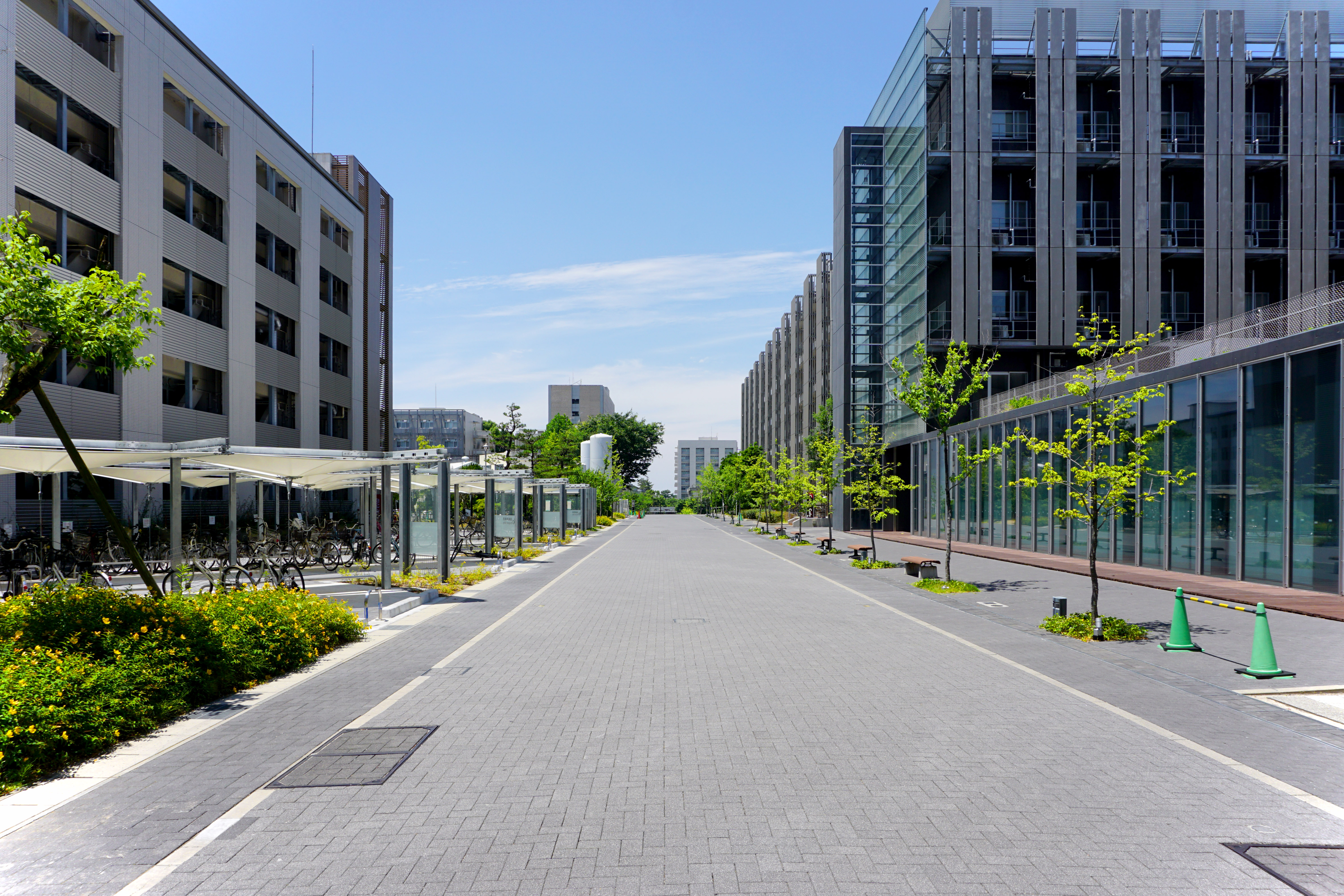
Nagoya University Higashiyama Campus. The university has produced seven Nobel Prize laureates in science.

Nagoya Imperial University was established as the last of the Imperial Universities in 1939 and was later renamed Nagoya University in 1947. Although relatively new as a university, it can trace its roots back to a Temporary Medical School/Public Hospital opened in 1871. Renowned for its contributions in physics and chemistry, the university has been the birthplace of notable scientific advancements such as the Sakata model, the PMNS matrix, the Okazaki fragment, Noyori asymmetric hydrogenation, and the Blue LED.

In March 2018, Nagoya University was chosen as one of the first five Designated National Universities. The Tokai National Higher Education and Research System, which became Japan's largest national higher education corporation, was formed by Nagoya University and Gifu University in April 2020. Both universities are prominent institutions in the Tōkai region.

=== Nobel prizes ===
Nearly half of the Japanese Nobel laureates in Natural Sciences in the 21st century have ties to Nagoya University, either as alumni or researchers. Among the seven Nobel laureates associated with the university, four served as professors and three as alumni. The 2021 Nobel laureate in Physics, Syukuro Manabe, was a specially invited professor at Nagoya University from December 2007 to March 2014.

== Overview ==
=== Ideals ===
Nagoya University's Academic Charter emphasises nurturing courageous intellectuals through an education that values independent thought. The university is known for its 'freedom, openness, and enterprising' academic style. From its early days as Nagoya Imperial University, the principle of 'Harmony is to be valued' from the Seventeen-article constitution, championed by its first president, has been a guiding ethos.

=== Student population ===
While the majority of its students come from Tōkai region, Nagoya University has a good portion of students from all over Japan.

The school also has many students from abroad. As of 2021, the total student enrollment is 15,771, with a total of over 1,900 international students from more than 110 countries.

== Faculties and graduate schools ==
=== Faculties ===
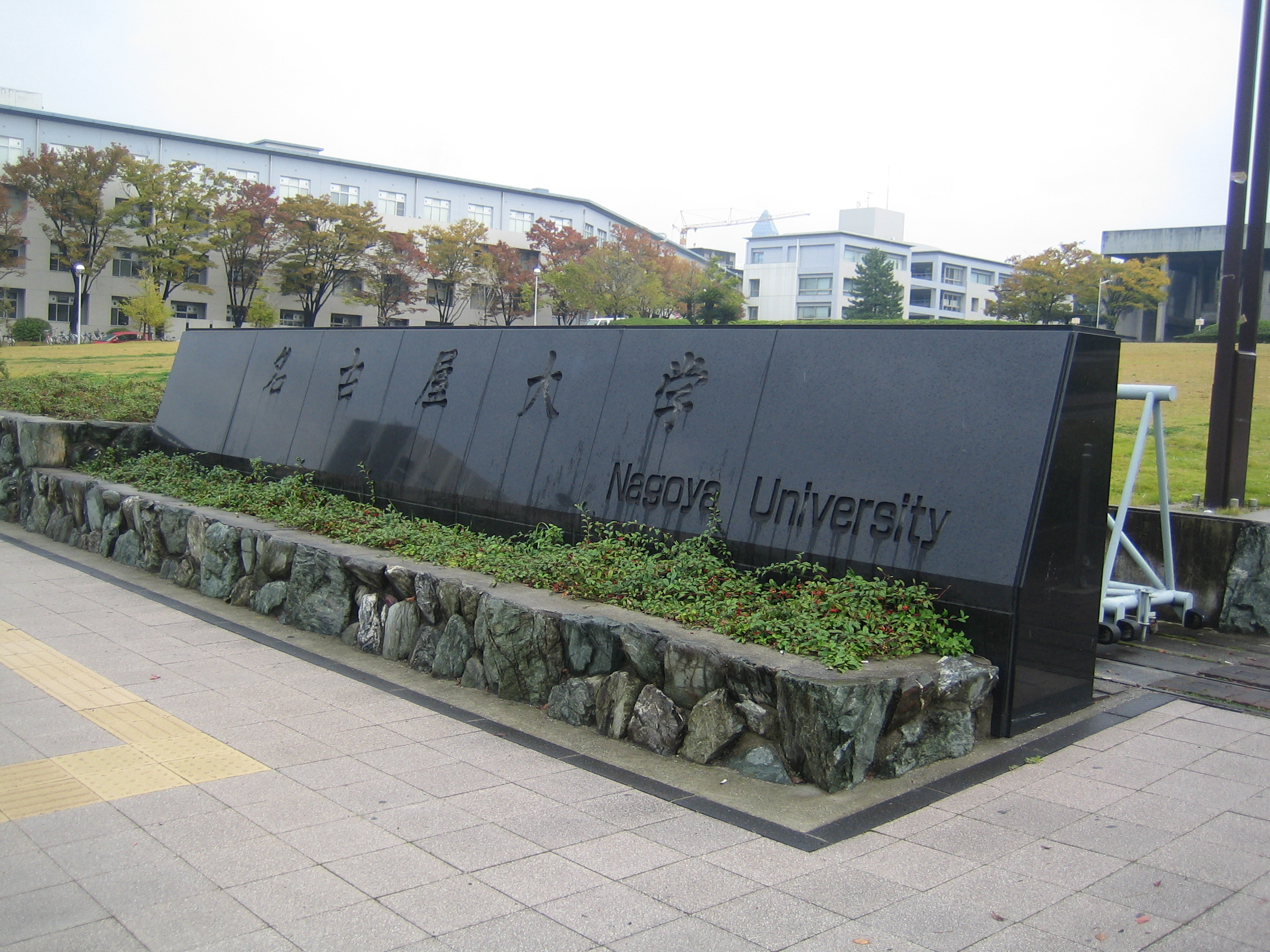
Nagoya University name monument

- Humanities
- Education
- Law and political science
- Economics
- Informatics
- Science
- Medicine
- Engineering
- Agriculture

=== Graduate schools ===
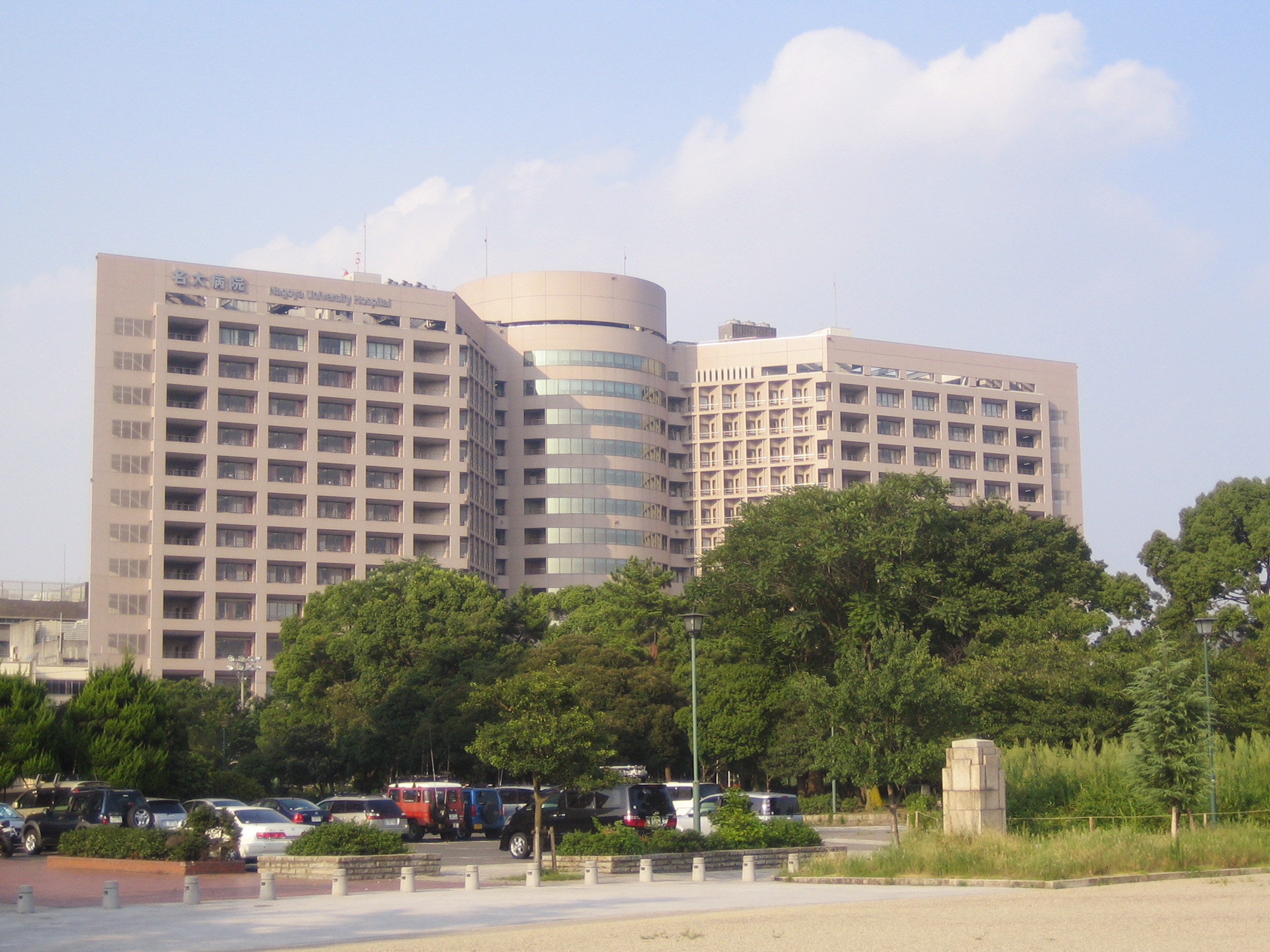
Nagoya University Hospital

- Humanities
- Education and Human Development
- Law and political science
- Economics
- Informatics
- Science
- Medicine
- Engineering
- Bioagricultural Sciences
- International Development (GSID)
- Mathematics
- Environmental Studies
- Pharmaceutical Sciences

== Research institutes ==
Nagoya University houses many research institutes, such as Institute of Transformative Bio-Molecules (ITbM), Institute for Space-Earth Environmental Research (ISEE), Institute of Materials and Systems for Sustainability (IMaSS), and Kobayashi-Masakawa Institute for the Origin of Particles and the Universe (KMI). The university's Earthquake and Volcano Research Center is represented on the national Coordinating Committee for Earthquake Prediction.

=== Institute of Transformative Bio-Molecules (ITbM) ===
ITbM was officially launched in April 2013, and is located in the Higashiyama campus of the university. It consists of a team of 14 principal investigators from within Nagoya University and other countries including Switzerland, Germany, Canada, and US. ITbM has five research fields: 'Parasitic plants', 'Chemistry-enabled plant adaptation', 'Clock diseases', 'Chemistry-enabled bioimaging', and 'Nanocarbon chemistry and biology'. Features of ITbM include having mix lab and offices, well-furnished with many high-quality instruments, and having English-speaking staff in the administration to facilitate the internationalization of the institute. ITbM also conducts the International Symposium on Transformative Bio-molecules (ISTbM) yearly in Nagoya, and presents awards such as the Hirata Award and Tsuneko & Reiji Okazaki Award to promising scientists in the fields of organic chemistry and biology.

=== Institute for Space-Earth Environmental Research (ISEE) ===
ISEE was established in October 2015, via the integration of the Solar-Terrestrial Environment Laboratory, the Hydrospheric Atmospheric Research Center, and the Center for Chronological Research, and is recognised by MEXT as a "Joint Usage/Research Center". ISEE consists of seven research divisions and three research centers, with interdisciplinary research (termed as 'fusion research') projects undergoing. The institute aims to contribute to solving global environmental issues and the space-related advancement of mankind and society, while also furthering the cooperation between academia and industry. International cooperation and collaborative research are key features of ISEE, including a yearly international symposium, the ISEE Summer Internship which accepts students from domestic and foreign universities, several ongoing international programs and projects, among many more.

=== Institute of Materials and Systems for Sustainability (IMaSS) ===
In 2004, the EcoTopia Science Institute was established through the restructuring and integration of several research centers, and was reorganized to NU's IMaSS in 2015. Its aim is to contribute to achieving an ecological and sustainable society via research on energy conservation, ranging from topics of materials and device technologies to system technologies, and is also recognised by MEXT as a "Joint Usage/Research Center". IMaSS consists of the Center for Integrated Research of Future Electronics (CIRFE), Advanced Measurement Technology Center (AMTC), Division of Materials Research (DM), Division of Systems Research (DS), two funded research divisions by Chubu Electric Power and Toyota Motor Corporation, and 10 industry–academia collaborative chairs. IMaSS also actively promotes international collaboration and joint research, and has research agreements with institutes and universities from many countries across the world including China, Korea, US, France, Thailand, and many more.

=== Kobayashi-Masakawa Institute for the Origin of Particles and the Universe (KMI) ===
KMI was established in 2010 as an international research hub for interdisciplinary particle physics and astrophysics, and was named after 2008 Nobel Prize winners Makoto Kobayashi and Toshihide Masakawa. It consists of two divisions, Division of Experimental Studies and Division of Theoretical Studies, and a new Internal Research Center for Flavor Physics was established in April 2023. It has several international partner institutions such as Tel Aviv University and Yonsei University, and also runs a JSPS Core-to-Core program 'DMNet' which focuses on dark matter research. Many KMI members belong to laboratories from the university's Graduate School of Science, Graduate School of Mathematics and ISEE, and although the institute does not directly accept students, graduate students can work with KMI members and be involved in the research.

== Campus life ==
=== Federation of Liberal Arts Circles ===
The federation was founded in 1961, and aims to help facilitate "better communications between circles, increase in literacy of students, encourage better understanding of each other and enhance friendship, as well as promoting and developing cultural activities." Some examples of circles in Nagoya University include tea ceremony, art, volunteering activities, music and dance, and literature, among the wide range of more than 60 circles officially registered.

=== Athletic Association ===
The athletic association was founded in 1956, and currently has more than 50 member athletic clubs.

Nagoya University and Osaka University hold regular Athletics Competition every year (名古屋大学・大阪大学対抗競技大会). In addition, the Seven Universities Athletic Meet (国立七大学総合体育大会, kokuritsu nana-daigaku sōgō taiiku-taikai) has been held since 1962. The competition is commonly called the Competition of the Seven Imperial Universities (七帝戦, shichi-tei sen) or the national athletic meet of the seven former imperial universities (七大戦, Nanadai-sen).

=== Nagoya university festival "Meidai-sai" ===
The university festival "Meidai-sai" is held every year in June since 1960, at the Higashiyama campus. Each year, the festival boasts a wide variety of approximately 100 events and activities, including laboratory tours, presentations, and hands-on activities organised by clubs and circles. Clubs and circles also set up food stalls selling various foods such as yakisoba (Japanese fried noodle dish) and kakigōri (shaved ice dessert).

Due to the COVID-19 pandemic, Meidai-sai was held online for both years 2020 and 2021.

== Academic rankings ==
University rankings
Global
THE	General	201–250
THE Reputation	General	151–200
QS	General	164
ARWU	Research	101–150
Nature Index Academic	Research	117

Regional
THE Asia (Asia version)	General	=48
QS Asia (Asia version)	General	=32

National

Program rankings
Social Sciences & Humanities

LAW
Asahi National	Research	4

Natural Sciences & Technology

Engineering
Kawaijuku National	General	6~7
QS World	General	96

PHYSICS
T.Reuters National	Research	6
T.Reuters World	Research	61

CHEMISTRY
T.Reuters National	Research	7
T.Reuters World	Research	43

BIOLOGY & BIOCHEMISTRY
T.Reuters National	Research	5
T.Reuters World	Research	97
- * T. Reuters World rankings include non-educational institutions

Nagoya University is recognised as a prestigious institution of education and learning in Japan.

=== General rankings ===
The Academic Ranking of World Universities (ARWU) for 2021 ranks Nagoya University as third in Japan and 84th worldwide. Nagoya University is ranked 118th globally by the QS World University Rankings for 2022, and 28th by the 2022 QS Asian University Rankings. The Times Higher Education World University Rankings rank Nagoya University as seventh in Japan and 351–400th globally.

=== Research performance ===
Nagoya University is one of the top research institutions in Japan. It has obtained the 6th place in general rankings for scientific research in Japan, with 1.3% of publications being highly cited. Furthermore, Nagoya had the 5th highest number of patents accepted (111) in 2019 among Japanese universities. According to a ranking released by Thomson Reuters in 2011, Nagoya is the 5th best research university in Japan. Its research standard is especially high in Physics (6th in Japan, 61st in the world), Chemistry (7th in Japan, 43rd in the world), and Biology & Biochemistry (5th in Japan, 97th in the world).

=== Alumni rankings ===
According to Toyo Keizai's "Ranking of the 200 Best Universities with Graduates Employed at Major Companies" in 2020, graduates from Nagoya University have the 12th best employment rate in 400 major companies in Japan, compared to the 2010s rankings where Nagoya University was ranked 38th.

== International education ==
=== Global 30 Project ===
Nagoya University, recognised for its global academic excellence, is a Type A university in the Top Global University Project by MEXT and has been offering the Global 30 (G30) International Programs since 2011. These programmes, conducted entirely in English, span various majors across undergraduate and graduate levels in fields such as humanities, law, economics, science, engineering, agriculture, and medicine, with yearly matriculation in October. The programme emphasises language proficiency by requiring international undergraduates to take Japanese classes, provides small class sizes, and encourages intensive research. Undergraduate students complete a thesis or lab work, while graduate programmes are research-focused, requiring applicants to align with professors' research interests.

=== Exchange programmes ===
Nagoya University offers several exchange programmes for international students, including the Nagoya University Program for Academic Exchange (NUPACE), established in 1996. NUPACE, a short-term exchange program lasting four to twelve months, has welcomed over 2,300 students from 155 institutions, offering a range of courses in English and Japanese. These courses cover Japanese language, intercultural studies, and major-specific topics, with some exclusive to NUPACE and others, such as G30 courses, open to regular students. Participants also have the option to engage in research under faculty guidance and enjoy benefits like student insurance counseling and accommodation in international dormitories. Other exchange programmes include Campus Asia for discussions on East Asian law and political science, JUACEP for engineering research in Japan, the US, and Canada, NUSIP focusing on automobile technology, and NUSTEP for intensive Japanese language learning.

For Nagoya University students, there are opportunities to study abroad at partner universities under inter-university and inter-school agreements, covering 161 and 306 universities respectively. These programmes offer financial aid, including travel expense coverage and stipends or loans. Engineering students can also participate in JUACEP, enabling them to conduct research and experience the research environment in North American institutions.

==== Joint PhD Program ====
During the 4-year PhD program, students spend at least 1 year at the overseas partner university, and pursue a single thesis project. The partner universities are as follows:

- Adelaide University (Australia) [June 2015–]
- Lund University (Sweden) [November 2016–]
- Freiburg University (Germany) [June 2018–]

== Notable alumni and affiliates ==
=== Physics and materials ===
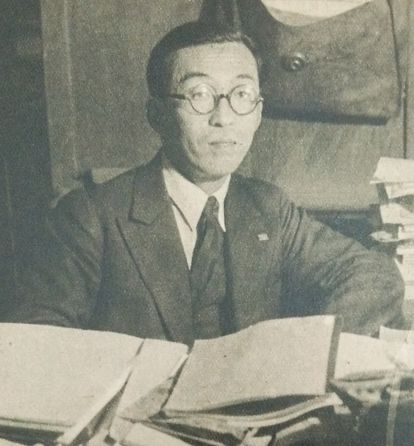
Shoichi Sakata, a physicist, known for theoretical work on the subatomic particles (Sakata model), Nobel Prize in Physics nominee.

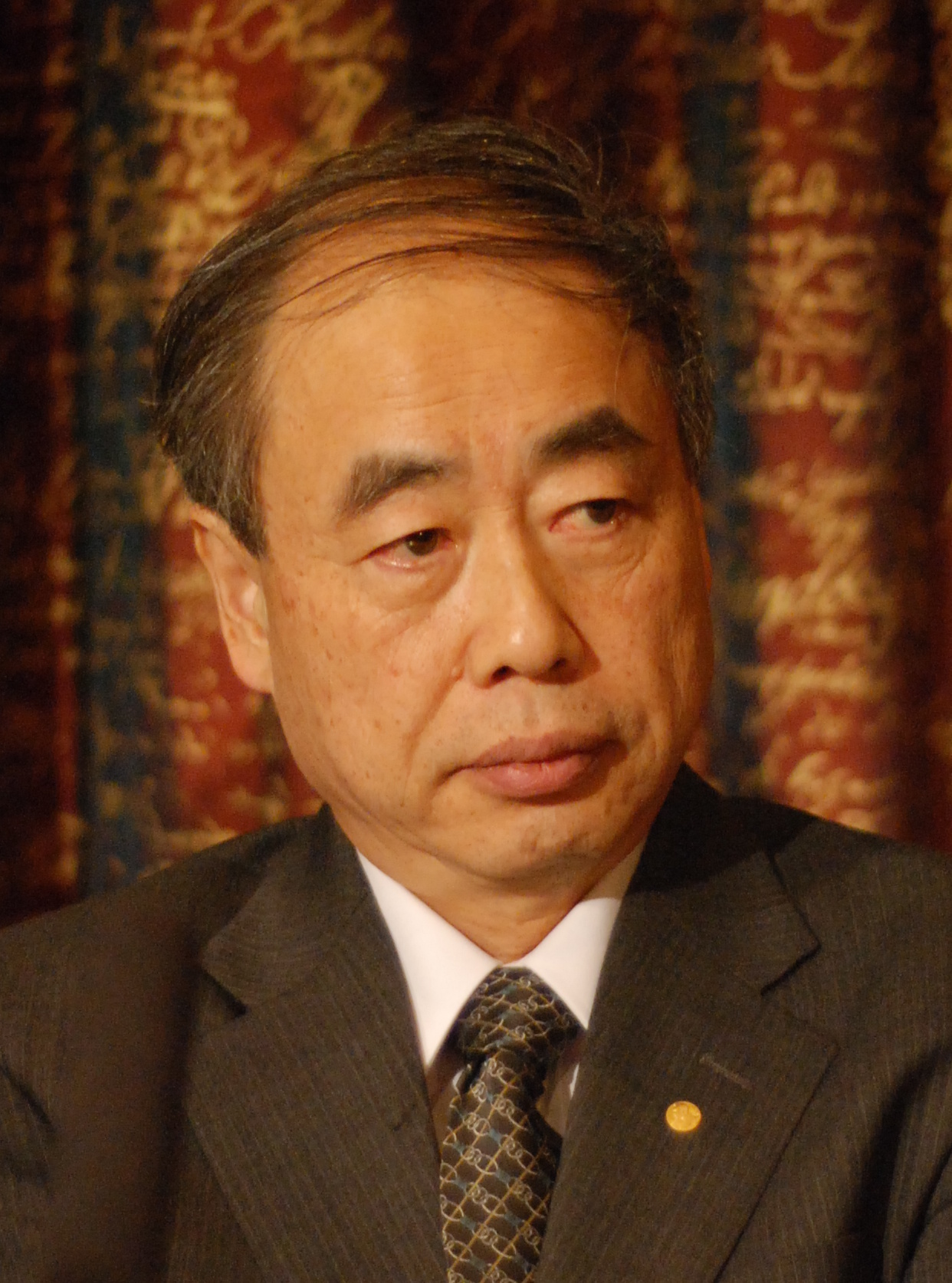
Makoto Kobayashi, one of the 2008 Nobel Prize in Physics for CKM matrix.

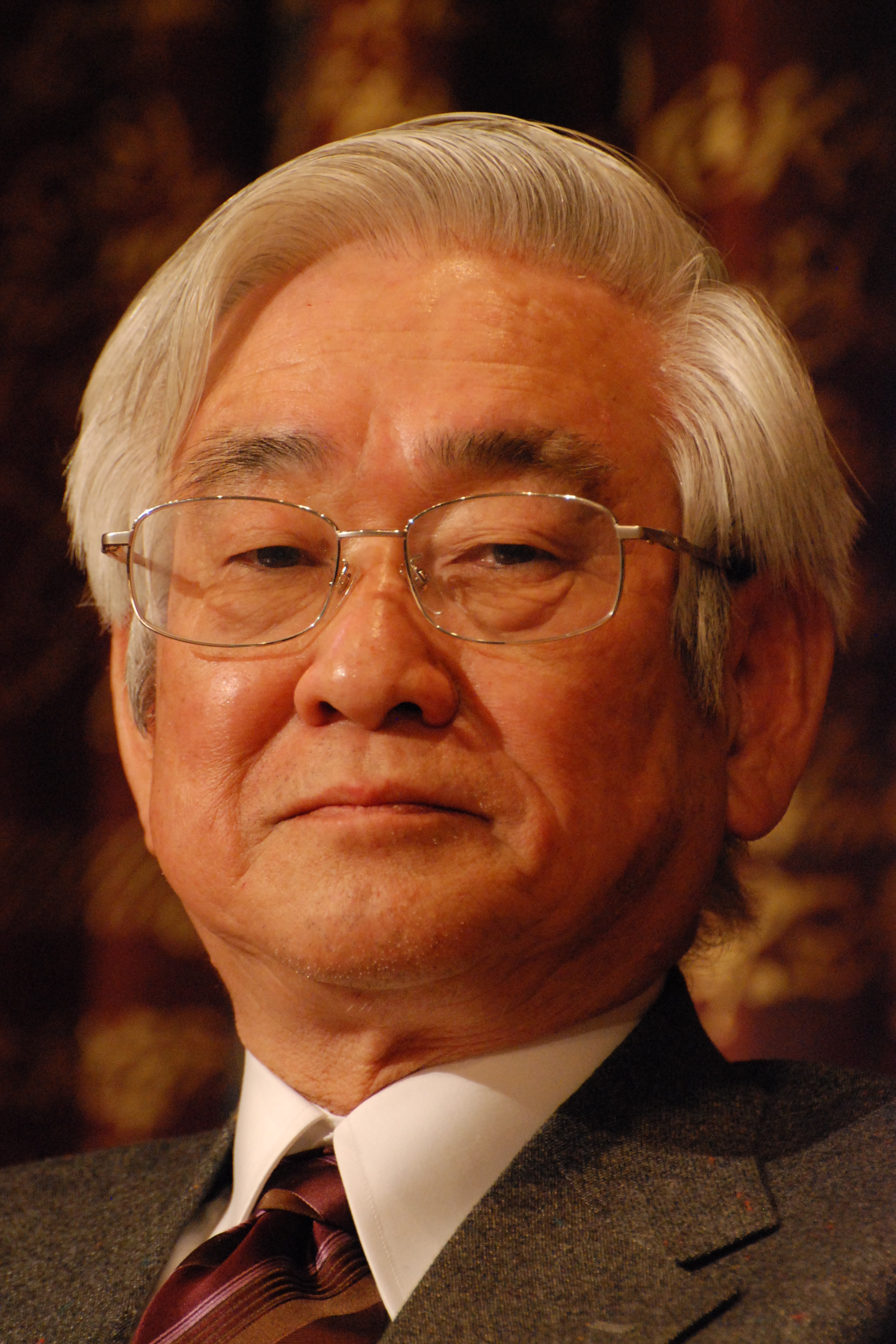
Toshihide Maskawa, one of the 2008 Nobel Prize in Physics for CKM matrix.

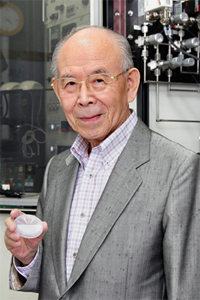
Isamu Akasaki, one of the 2014 Nobel Prize in Physics for inventing the blue LED.

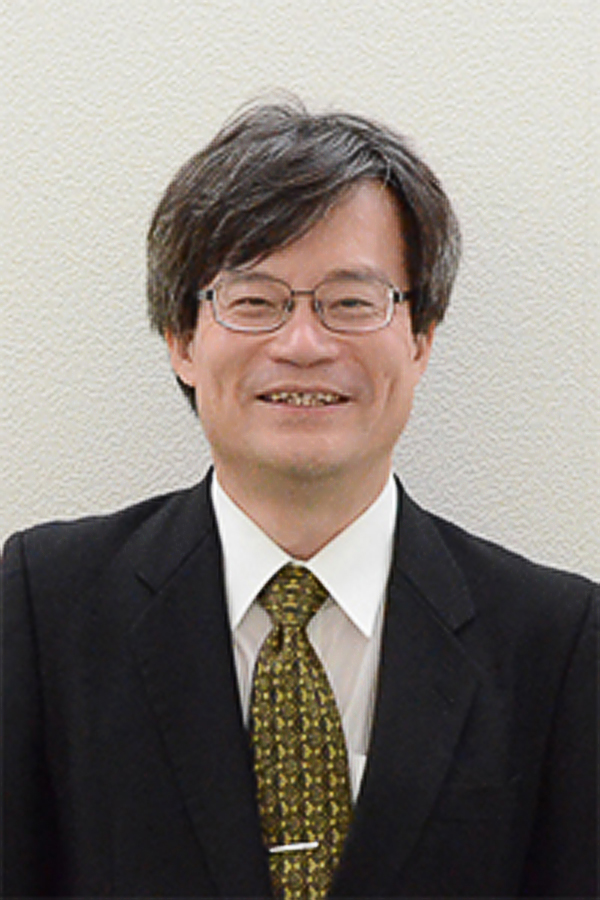
Hiroshi Amano, one of the 2014 Nobel Prize in Physics for inventing the blue LED.

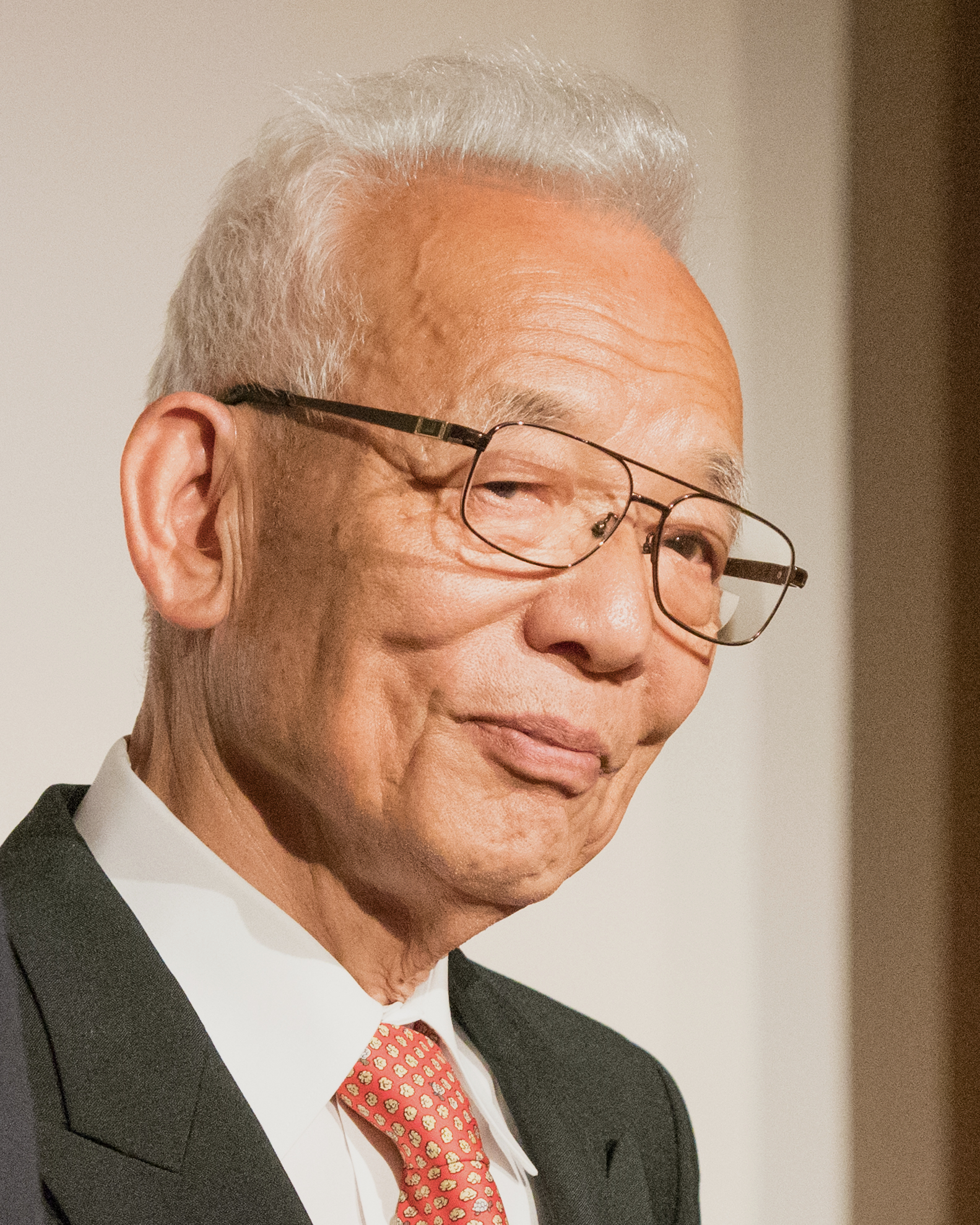
Syukuro Manabe, one of the 2021 Nobel Prize in Physics for physical modeling of Earth's climate.
- Yoshio Ohnuki, a physicist, 1955–56 Nobel Prize in Physics nominee.
- Hiroomi Umezawa, a physicist, known for his fundamental contributions to quantum field theory.
- Yasushi Takahashi, a physicist, known for the Ward–Takahashi identity.
- Bunji Sakita, a physicist, one of the discoverers of supersymmetry.
- Sumio Iijima, a physicist, inventor of carbon nanotubes.
- Akira Tonomura, a physicist, for his development of electron holography
- Toshio Matsumoto, an astronomer, professor emeritus of JAXA.
- Morinobu Endo, a physicist and chemist, pioneers of carbon nanofibers and carbon nanotubes synthesis.

=== Chemistry and biology ===
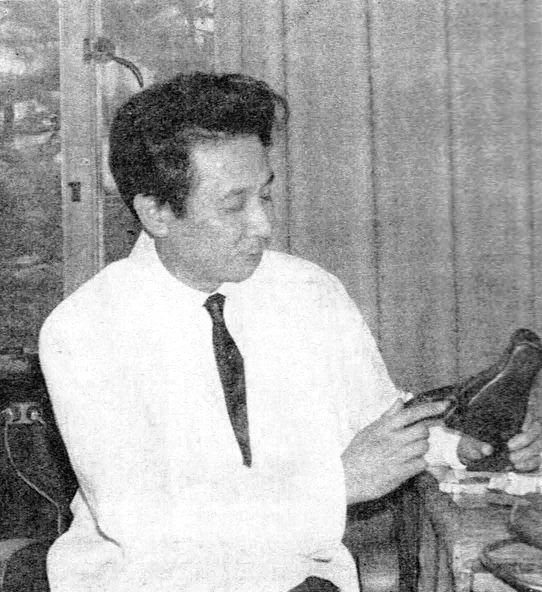
Koji Nakanishi, a Japanese-American bioorganic and natural products chemist, graduated from Nagoya, professor at Columbia University.

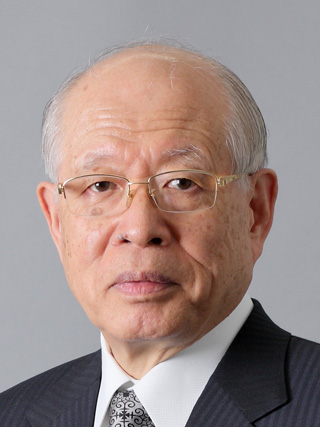
Ryōji Noyori, one of the 2001 Nobel Prize in Chemistry winners, spent most of his academic career researching and teaching at the university.

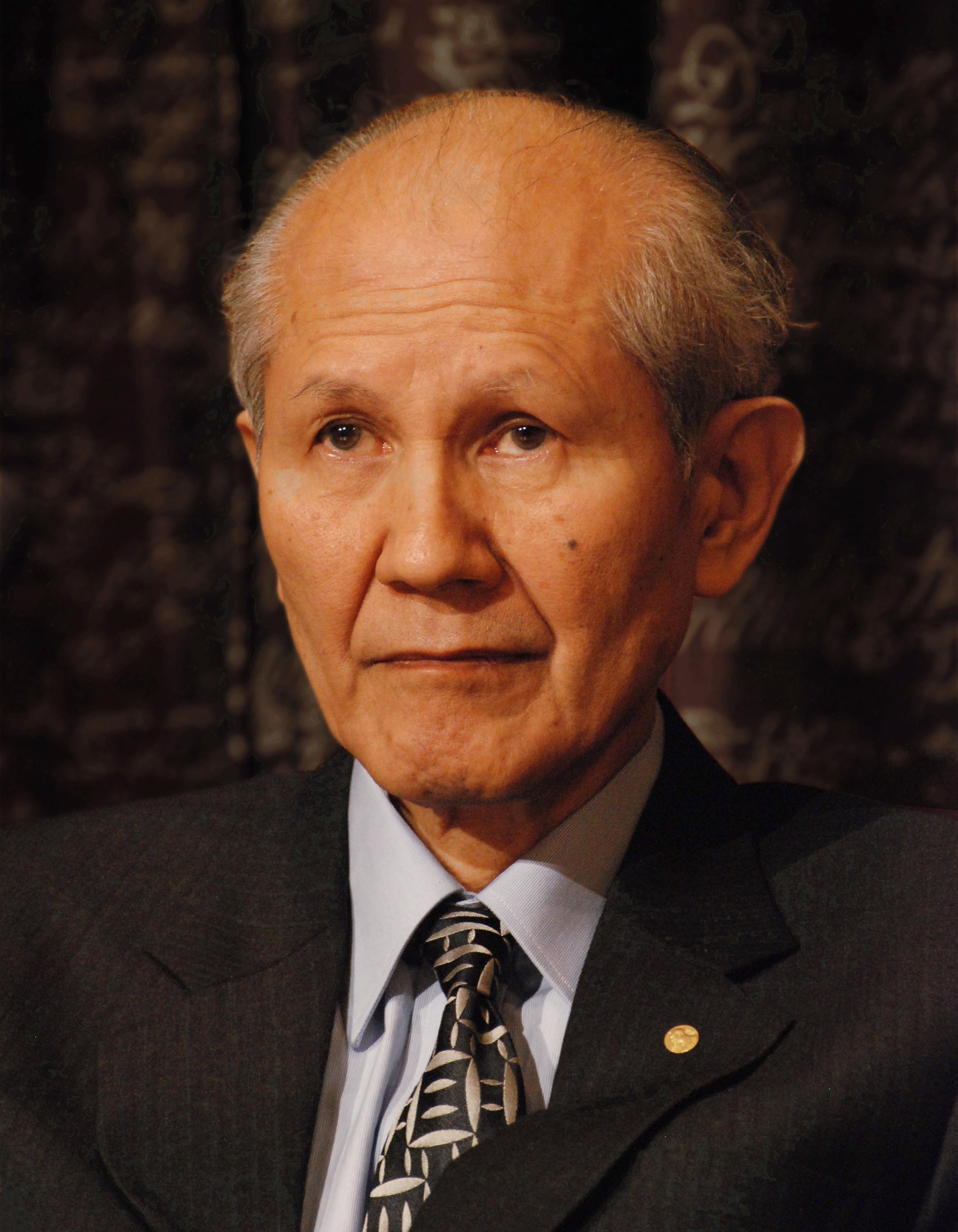
Osamu Shimomura, one of the 2008 Nobel Prize in Chemistry for green fluorescent protein (GFP).

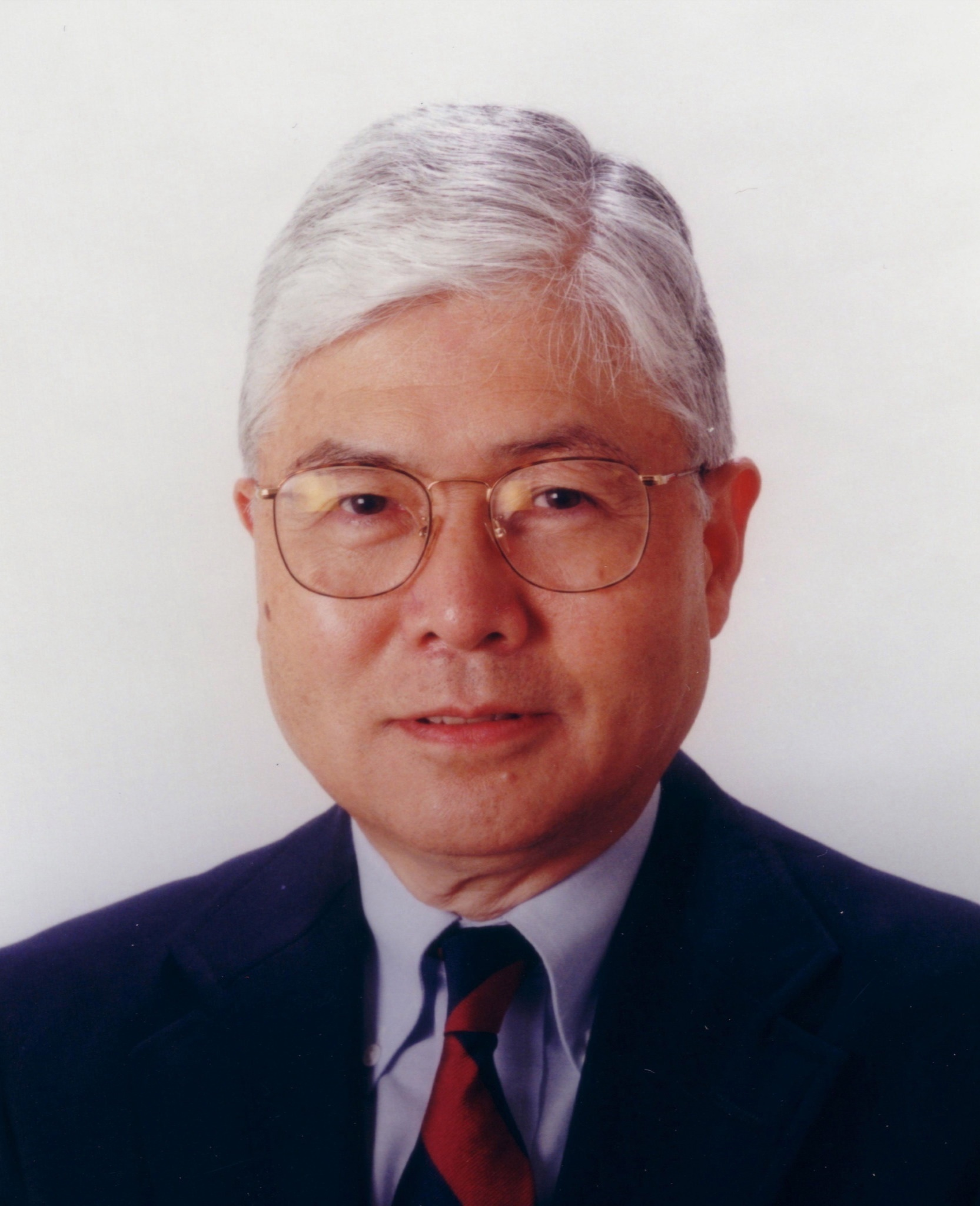
Yoshito Kishi, Morris Loeb Professor of Chemistry at Harvard University.

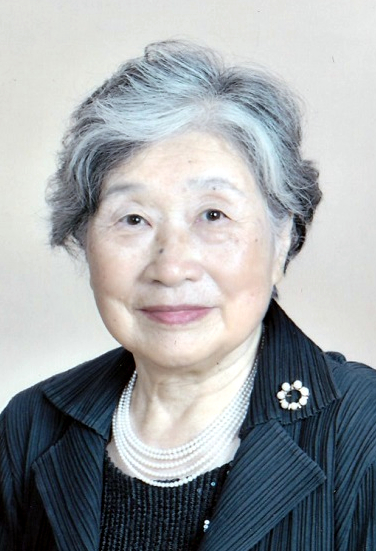
Tsuneko Okazaki, pioneering molecular biologists, discoverer of the Okazaki fragments, 2000 L'Oréal-UNESCO Awards for Women in Science winner.

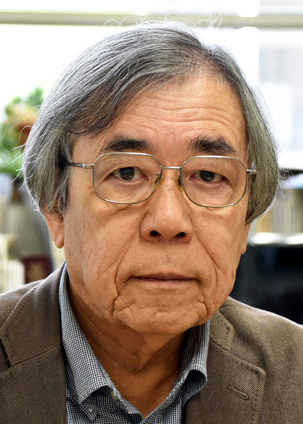
Masatoshi Takeichi, a cell biologist, discoverer of the Cadherin, 2020 Canada Gairdner International Award winner.
- Kuno Yasu, a physiologist, 1936, 1938, 1953 Nobel Prize in Physiology or Medicine nominee.
- Yoshimasa Hirata, an organic chemist, known for "Hirata-school" in Japan.
- Reiji Okazaki, Pioneering molecular biologists, discoverer of the Okazaki fragments, graduated from Nagoya and later became a professor at the university.
- Hisashi Yamamoto, a Japanese chemist, laureate of the Medal of Honor with a Purple Ribbon.
- Tohru Fukuyama, an organic chemist and professor of chemistry at the University of Tokyo.

=== Mathematics ===
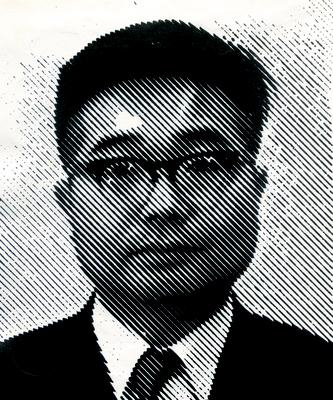
Masayoshi Nagata, mathematician, disproved Hilbert's fourteenth problem.

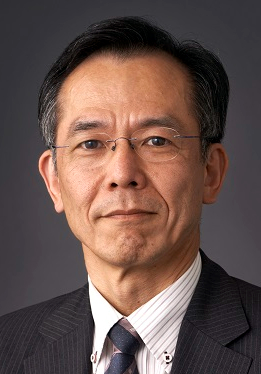
Shigefumi Mori, one of the 1990 Fields Medalists, spent most of his academic career at the university until he won the Fields Medal in 1990.

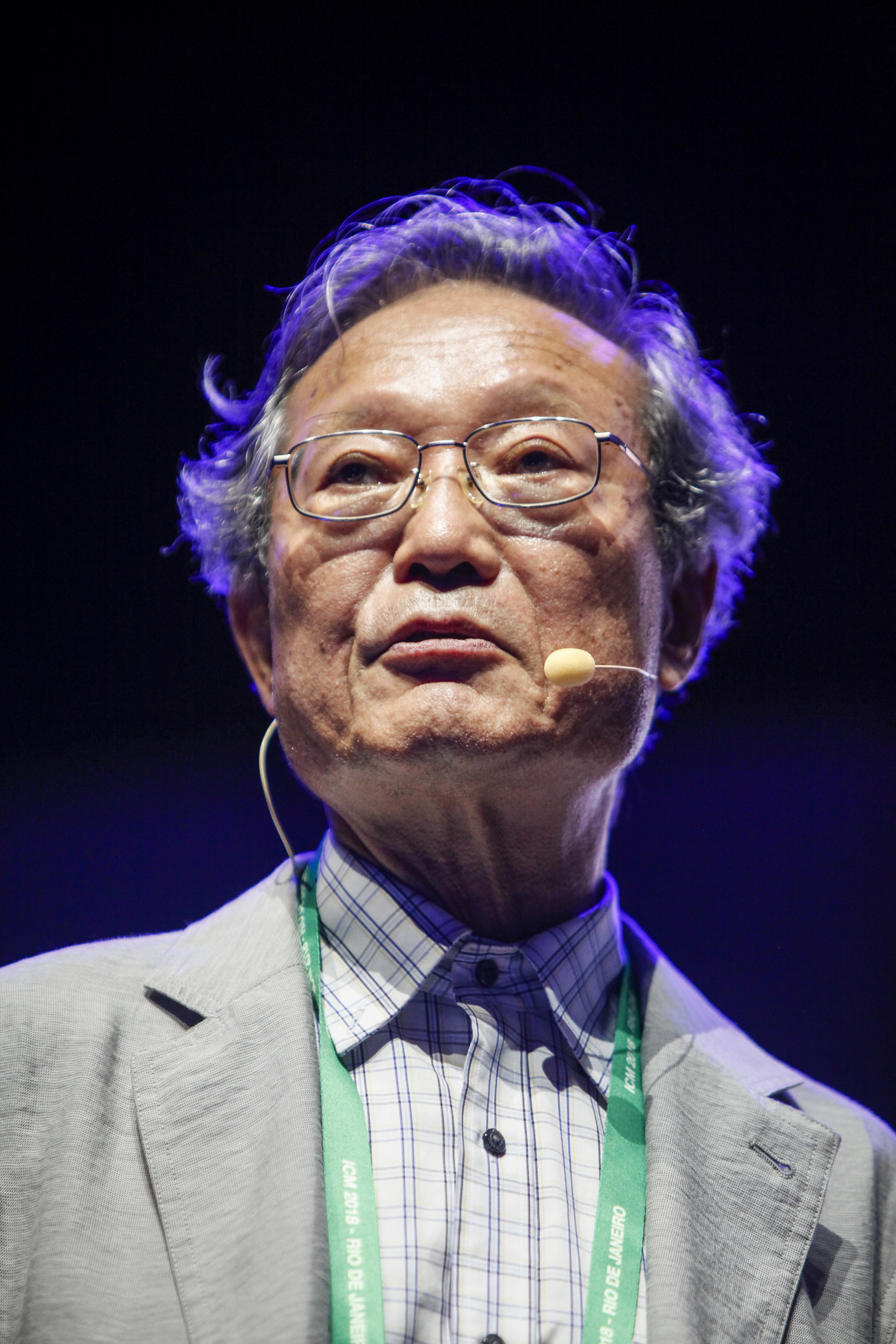
Masaki Kashiwara, mathematician, 2025 Abel Prize winner.
- Goro Azumaya, a Japanese mathematician, introduced the notion of Azumaya algebra.
- Masatake Kuranishi, a Japanese mathematician, established the Cartan-Kuranishi Theorem.
- Tomio Kubota, a Japanese mathematician.
- Takashi Ono, a Japanese mathematician.
- Hiroshi Umemura, a Japanese mathematician who studied Painlevé equations, particularly Galois theory.

=== Politics and business ===
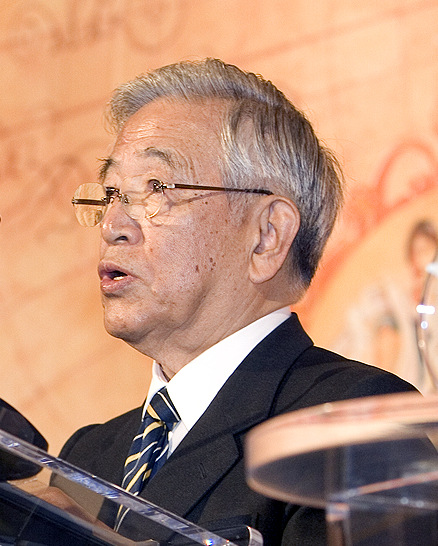
Shoichiro Toyoda, Ex-CEO of Toyota Motor.

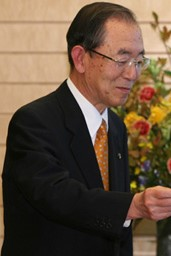
Uichiro Niwa, Japanese Ambassador to China, former Chairman and President of Itochu, former CEO of Japan Post Holdings
- Tang Jun, President and CEO of Xin Hua Du Industrial Group Co.
- Sai Khaing Myo Tun – Deputy Minister of Education of National Unity Government of Myanmar
- Le Thanh Long – Deputy Prime Minister of Vietnam
- Ken Prayoon Cheng – Entrepreneur and investor, founder of many successful US-based companies including NetIQ/Attachmate, Proximex/Tyco International, etc.
- Akmal Burkhanov, Uzbek public and political figure
