= S9 fraction =

The S9 fraction is the product of an organ tissue homogenate used in biological assays. The S9 fraction is most frequently used in assays that measure the metabolism of drugs and other xenobiotics. It is defined by the U.S. National Library of Medicine's "IUPAC Glossary of Terms Used in Toxicology" as the "Supernatant fraction obtained from an organ (usually liver) homogenate by centrifuging at 9000 g for 20 minutes in a suitable medium; this fraction contains cytosol and microsomes." The microsomes component of the S9 fraction contain cytochrome P450 isoforms (phase I metabolism) and other enzyme activities. The cytosolic portion contains the major part of the activities of transferases (phase II metabolism). The S9 fraction is easier to prepare than purified microsomes.

== Applications ==
The S9 fraction has been used in conjunction with the Ames test to assess the mutagenic potential of chemical compounds. Chemical substances sometimes require metabolic activation in order to become mutagenic. Furthermore, the metabolic enzymes of bacteria used in the Ames test differ substantially from those in mammals. Therefore, to mimic the metabolism of test substance that would occur in mammals, the S9 fraction is often added to the Ames test.

The S9 fraction has also been used to assess the metabolic stability of candidate drugs.
