= Tsuneko Okazaki =

Japanese scientist (1933–2026)

- 岡崎 恒子
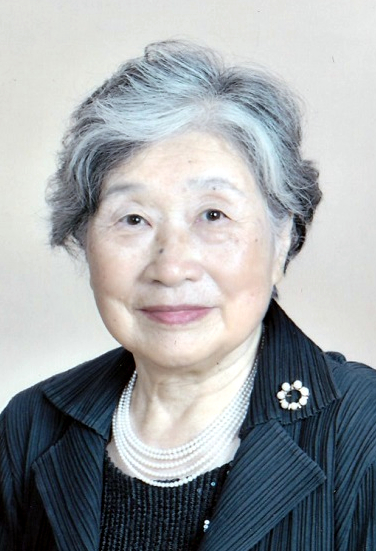
- Born: 7 June 1933; Nagoya, Aichi Prefecture, Japan
- Died: 22 September 2026 (aged 93)
- Education: Nagoya University (PhD, 1956)
- Known for: Okazaki fragments
- Spouse: Reiji Okazaki
- Children: 2
- Awards: L'Oréal-UNESCO Awards for Women in Science (2000); Order of the Sacred Treasure (2008); Person of Cultural Merit (2015); Order of Culture (2021)
- Scientific career
- Fields: Molecular biology
- Workplaces: University of Washington, Stanford University, Nagoya University, Fujita Health University, Chromo Research, Inc., Japan Society for the Promotion of Science

Tsuneko Okazaki (岡崎 恒子, Okazaki Tsuneko; 7 June 1933 – 22 September 2026) was a Japanese pioneer of molecular biology known for her work on DNA replication and specifically for discovering Okazaki fragments, along with her late husband Reiji. She continued to be involved in academia, contributing to more advancements in DNA research.

== Early life and education ==
Tsuneko Okazaki was born in Nagoya, capital of the Aichi Prefecture of Japan, on 7 June 1933. She graduated from Aichi Prefectural Asahigaoka Senior High School. During her undergraduate years, she studied biology at Nagoya University School of Science. She graduated with her PhD from the university in 1956, which was also the year that she met her husband, Reiji Okazaki. They married that same year and soon after, they joined their research work and laboratories.

== Work leading to and discovery of Okazaki fragments ==
Tsuneko and Reiji Okazaki's early research consisted of studying DNA synthesis and specific nucleotide characteristics in frog eggs and sea urchins. This work led to the discovery of thymidine-diphosphate rhamnose, a sugar-linked nucleotide, which then opened up the doors for them to work in the U.S. They worked at University of Washington and Stanford University in the labs of J. L. Strominger and Arthur Kornberg, respectively, where there was a lot more availability of resources to further their research. Years later, after much research done in both the U.S and Japan, in 1968, Tsuneko and Reiji published their breakthrough findings on Okazaki fragments in PNAS. After Reiji Okazaki's early death from Hiroshima-induced leukemia in 1975, Tsuneko continued her research and moved on to proving the structure of the RNA primer associated with Okazaki fragments.

== Additional research contributions ==
Tsuneko continued to be involved in different research projects, mainly investigating different aspects of DNA. She served as head of laboratories, lead academic supervisor of students, and as a significant intellectual contributor. Specifically, her contributions have included research revealing hGCMa as a placenta-specific transcription regulator, possibly involved in the expression of multiple placenta-specific genes. She contributed to research on the human centromere protein B found to induce translational positioning of nucleosomes on α-satellite sequences. She worked on understanding the genomic regulation of HLA-G and how the presence of a LINE1 gene silencer may explain the limited expression of HLA-G. She also contributed to the research on mice with characteristics of down syndrome in order to understand the genotype-phenotype characteristics of down syndrome in humans.

== Career involvements ==
Tsuneko was an associate professor in molecular biology at the School of Science in Nagoya University from 1967 to 1983. She held this position until she became a lead professor from 1983 to 1997. In 1997, she moved to the Institute of Comprehensive Medical Science, Fujita Health University, where she was a professor for five years and then became a visiting professor until 2008. Additionally, throughout the years of 2004 to 2007, her main job was in the Stockholm office, where she was the director of the Japan Society for the Promotion of Science. She was also CEO/president and director of Chromo Research Inc. from 2008 to 2015.

== Personal life and death ==
In 1963, after coming back from conducting research at University of Washington and Stanford University along with her husband, Tsuneko had her first child. She then had her second child in 1973. Due to the lack of nursery care in Japan at the time, Tsuneko had difficulty finding help to take care of her children, as she was working full-time with her research. She was part of a citizens' campaign where she marched for more availability of child-care support. Reiji Okazaki died in 1975, but Tsuneko continued working to complete the research they were working on.

Tsuneko died on 22 September 2026, at the age of 93.

== Recognitions ==
Tsuneko was awarded Chunichi Culture Award, the L'Oréal-UNESCO Awards for Women in Science in 2000.

She was also awarded the Medal with Purple Ribbon in 2000, the Order of the Sacred Treasure, [and] Gold Rays with Neck Ribbon in 2008.

In 2015, Nagoya University created the Tsuneko and Reiji Okazaki Award, "in honor of the spirit and legacy of Professors Okazaki."

In 2015, she was elected as a Person of Cultural Merit.

In 2021, she received the Order of Culture.
