= Pulse-chase analysis =

Lab technique in molecular biology

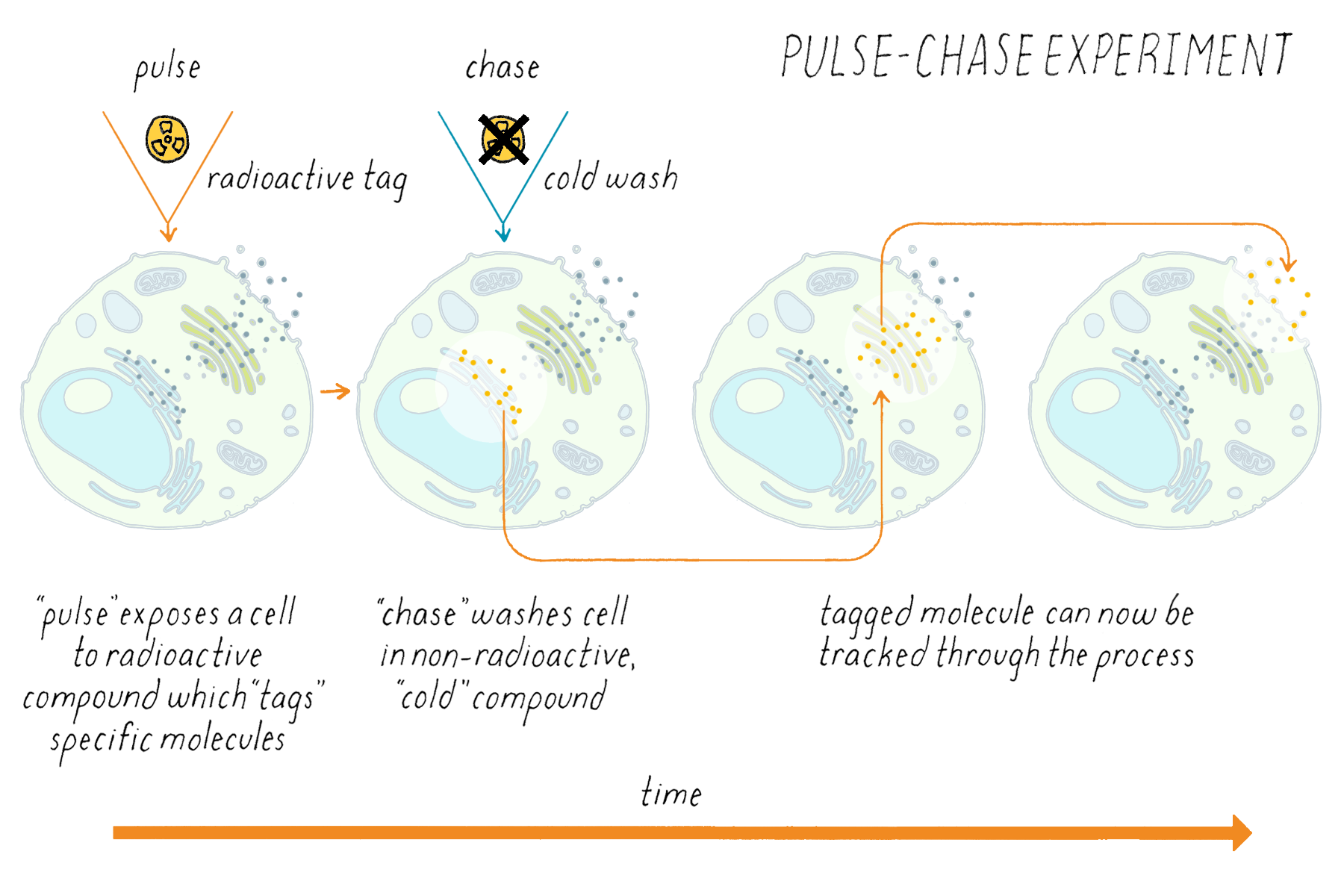
A method by which cells are exposed to labeled compound (pulse) and then to an unlabeled version of the compound (chase) to study a cellular process.

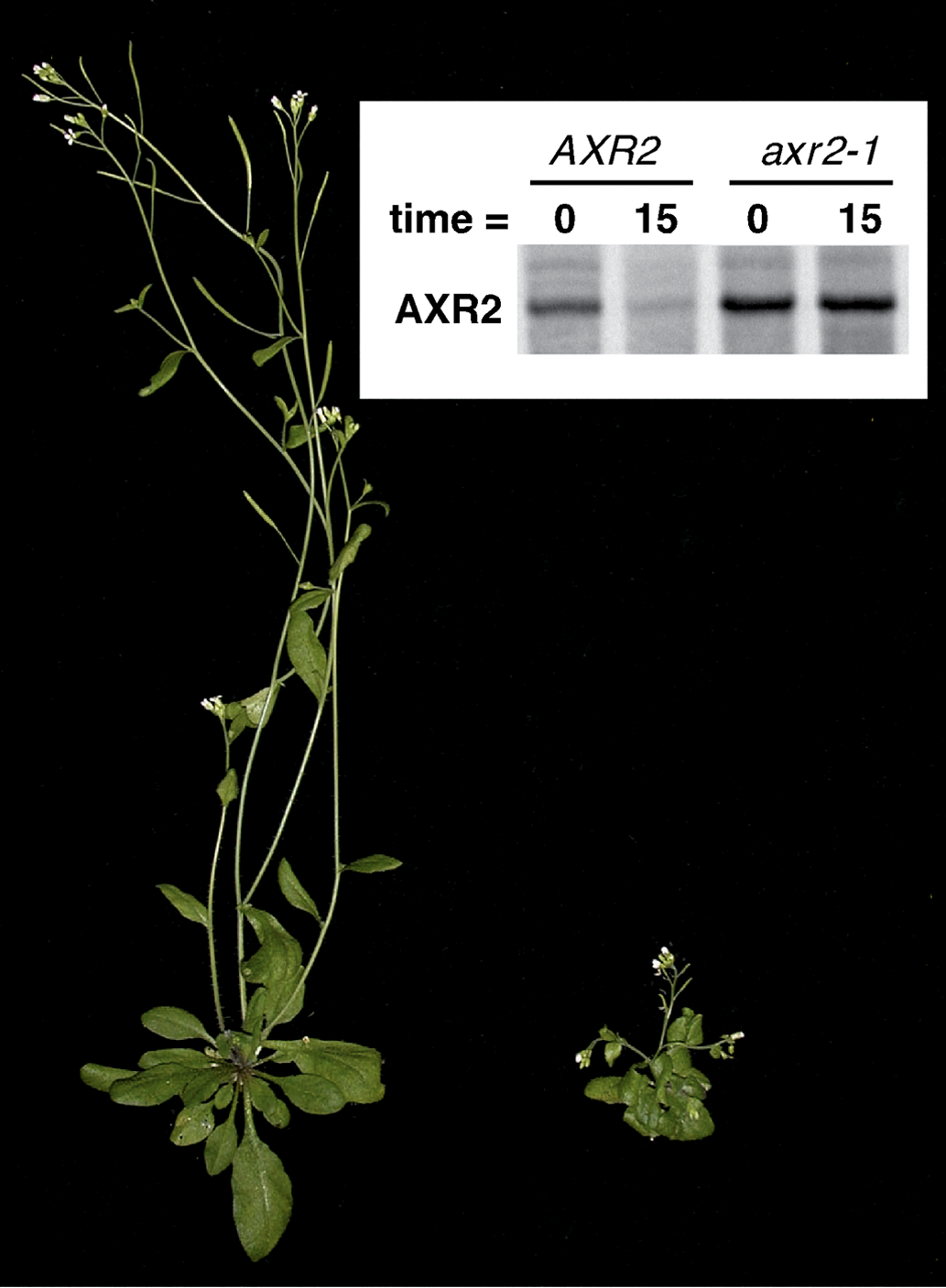
Pulse-chase analysis of auxin signal transduction in an Arabidopsis thaliana wildtype and an axr2-1 mutant. Wild-type and axr2-1 seedlings were labeled with 35S-methionine, and AXR2/axr2-1 protein was immunoprecipitated either immediately after the labeling period (t = 0) or following a 15-minute chase with unlabeled methionine (t = 15).

Pulse-chase analysis (PCA) is used to study the life cycles of proteins. Pulse-chase analysis experiments use radioactive and cytotoxic labels to "tag" proteins. Commonly used methods include treating cells with cycloheximide (CHX) to stop protein synthesis or radioisotopic amino acids or proteins such as green fluorescent protein (GFP). These labels are used to study proteins through their life cycles.

While pulse-chase analysis is mainly used to study proteins, it can also be used to study different molecular structures that interact with proteins. Proteins can interact with different structures either because they are incorporated into the structure, such as in cells, or because they are part of a larger structure, such as in macromolecules.

In biochemistry and molecular biology, a pulse-chase analysis is a method for examining a cellular process occurring over time by successively exposing the cells to a labeled compound (pulse) and then to the same compound in an unlabeled form (chase).

== Mechanism ==
Pulse-chase experiments are divided into two parts- a "pulse" and a "chase." In the "pulse" part of the experiment, the proteome of cells are labelled with radioactive amino acids. In the "chase" part of the experiment, cells are stopped from taking up amino acids.

To start a pulse-chase experiment, cells are grown in the presence of radioactive amino acids. This is done so that cells will uptake the amino acids into their proteomes. When researchers want to study protein synthesis, (e.g. folding, transport, degradation), researchers start the "chase" part of the experiment. To initiate chase, cells are exposed to nonradioactive amino acid isotopes to halt the uptake of radioactive isotopes. Researchers then study the time of the chase while the protein is in the process of interest.

A selected cell or a group of cells is first exposed to a labeled compound (the pulse) that is to be incorporated into a molecule or system that is studied (also see pulse labeling). The compound then goes through the metabolic pathways and is used in the synthesis of the product studied. For example, a radioactively labeled form of leucine (^{3}H-leucine) can be supplied to a group of pancreatic beta cells, which then uses this amino acid in insulin synthesis.

Various other experimental techniques can be used to supplement pulse-chase analysis. These include cell staining, immunoprecipitation, and SDS-PAGE.

Shortly after introduction of the labeled compound (usually about 5 minutes, but the actual time needed is dependent on the object studied), excess of the same, but unlabeled, substance (the chase) is introduced into the environment. Following the previous example, the production of insulin would continue, but it would no longer contain the radioactive leucine introduced in the pulse phase and would not be visible using radioactive detection methods. However, the movement of the labeled insulin produced during the pulse period could still be tracked within the cell.

=== Removal of radioactive and cytotoxic materials ===
PCA uses radioactive materials to label proteins in the "pulse" part of the experiment and cytotoxic materials in the "chase" to stop protein synthesis. This is hazardous to the cells that are used during experiments. Researchers have developed various methods to use materials that are not toxic or radioactive. Examples of this include using L-azidohomoalanine (AHA) and 4sU. In the example of AHA, AHA is used to label proteins. AHA then reacts with an alkyne group to isolate AHA-labelled proteins. In this method, mammalian cells are washed with 0.5%-SDS RIPA buffer and PBS, and half-life is calculated with half-life and exponential decay formulas. Protein misfolding and heat shock were induced in cells, and cells were then subject to pulse-chase analysis, SDS-PAGE, and immunoblotting to determine protein behavior. AHA is shown to be a suitable alternative to radioactive and cytotoxic materials. It has comparable results to radioactive pulse-chase analysis; the only difference detected was when using mammalian cells, as AHA was shown to possibly alter heat shock response. Cells can be studied further by studying the proteins used, post-translational modifications, and heat shock to determine cell viability.

Pulse-chase analysis is also used with 4sU. miRNAs are used in post-transcriptional gene regulation, and play a large role in the cell cycle. Although miRNA is a large part of post-translational modifications, not much is known about how it degrades. When comparing initial amount of miRNA in a PCA versus at the end of the experiment, there is a significant decrease in the amount of miRNA. Although miRNA is structurally stable, indications of degradation and decay are found through determining the half-life of miRNA. In this PCA, miRNA was tagged with 4sU and were separated based on their "age" or whether they were pri-miRNAs or mature miRNAs. With 4sU being the label, mature miRNAs were separated from pri-mRNAs after protein processing based on the amount of degradation on labels. The efficiency of miRNAs can also be determined through pulse-chase analysis by comparing transcription rates between pri-miRNA and mature mRNA.

== Impact of material on decay rates ==
In PCA experiments, proteins kinetics are interpreted by studying the length of a chase. While proteins degradation often follows exponential models of decay, problems in predicting decay curves occur when degradation does not follow an exponential model. Proteins can degrade over time without external factors, but cytotoxic and radioactive materials used in pulse-chase experiments increase the rate of degradation. Decay patterns are determined from the amount of degraded protein at the end of a chase. For this reason, accurate degradation is important to determining decay rate. To account for non-exponential decay patterns, pulse length and probabilities of molecular decay are taken into consideration. After experimental data is collected, decay rates are shown using Markov chains. Markov chains are statistical methods to determine the probability of an event. In PCA, Markov chains are used to predict the lifetime of a molecule, the age-dependent decay rate, and accurate pulse length.

=== Methods used with PCA ===
==== Cell staining ====
Cell division orientations can be determined using PCA and cell staining. Cell staining is used in conjunction with PCA to support and give visual data on hypothesized cell processes. Different parts of cells, such as the spindle, are stained in order to image them at different stages of the cell cycle. This information is used with data for corresponding "pulse" and "chase" periods. In this particular experiment, 5-ethynyl-2'-deoxyuridine (EdU) is used to label Arabidopsis Thaliana leaf cells. Cells nuclei were stained and the staining and pulse-chase signals were compared. The division angle of the cells were used to determine the cell stages the direction of cell division.

The morphology of cell organelles can be studied when using PCA to determine the stage of the cell's life cycle. Cells can be stained with various fluorescent cell stains such as DAPI, Propidium Iodide, or Hoechst in order to image dead cells or cell nuclei. In this experiment, immunolabeling and fluorescent staining are used in conjunction with one another. Cells are labelled with EdU. The experiment was done on plant cells- specifically, root cells of Arabidopsis Thaliana. Cells were isolated from plants, immunolabelled with EdU, and stained with fluorescent dyes. The comparison of imaging cells with DAPI and the PCA results showed that amounts of Golgi Apparatus increased during the late G1 part of the cell cycle.

==== Immunoprecipitation and SDS-PAGE ====
Immunoprecipitation can be used to determine the proteins present in a solution. This is done by breaking down the different components of a macromolecule the protein is part of. When conducting PCA, it is used to recover a previously labelled protein and determine where a protein is in the process of protein processing. The protein macromolecules are treated with endoglycosidases to break them down and run through SDS-PAGE to determine the identity of the individual proteins. This information of the unique proteins present is used to determine the mechanisms of a protein at a certain time. Immunoprecipitation is not always used, however, due to concerns of misidentifying labelled and unlabelled proteins.

When conducting a PCA experiment, cells are washed of extracellular debris and materials that could interfere or create noise when isolating the protein of interest. However, when the materials in an experiment are washed, this can take upwards of 15 minutes. When trying to examine specific stages of biological processes, such as cell cycles or protein degradation, increased time used to wash cells could potentially interfere with the results of an experiment. Pulse-chase experiments can be modified in order to not require washing. Researchers have developed a way to used fluorescent proteins and fluorescence resonance energy transfer (FRET) to label proteins. Nucleophilic enzymes were labelled and instead of washing, noise-interfering compounds were removed through elimination reactions. This approach to PCA can shed light on time-dependent protein reactions such as the speed of protein expression or movement.

== Uses ==
This method is useful for determining the activity of certain cells over a prolonged period of time. The method has been used to study protein kinase C, ubiquitin, and many other proteins. The method was also used to prove the existence and function of Okazaki fragments. George Palade used pulse-chase of radioactive amino acids to elucidate the secretory pathway.

=== Health science ===
PCA is used in several ways for biomedical research- it uses proteins to study the lifespans and of structures that interact with proteins. Examples of this include stem cells, procollagen, cell turnover, and viral inclusions.

==== Cell division and turnover ====
Pulse-chase analysis can be used to determine the rate of division of stem cells. Stem cells are different from regular cells in that they rarely divide. Researchers have used pulse-chase analysis in the kidney cells of mice and rats in order to study the cell cycle and cell life length of stem cells. Different pulse lengths were used to determine whether a label-retaining cell (LRC) was a stem cell or not. Cells that retained their tags for longer periods of time and were "slow-cycling" were hypothesized to be stem cells. Pulses were also used to detect DNA analog labels, and to detect the number of cell divisions they had gone through by using the cells' half-life.

Cell turnover rates can be monitored through pulse-chase analysis. Researchers use a combination of pulse-chase analysis and laser ablation electrospray ionization mass spectrometry (LAESI-MS) in order to mechanically increase cell turnover rate. Amino acids were used to label photosynthetic green algae and Chlamydomonas reinhardtii cells. Pulse-chase analysis was used to track the isotopic amino acid labels. This was compared to photosynthesis rates in cells, contributing to knowledge of cell life cycle.

==== Procollagen (Protein) ====
Procollagen is studied because it plays a role in diseases related to connective tissues. Procollagen interacts with collagen and proteins, and it travels through various organelles such as the endoplasmic reticulum and the golgi apparatus. PCA is used to study the formation of procollagen and the disruption of its formation. PCA is done by using non-radioactive cells in order to not potentially disturb the cells' function. This experiment also uses AHA to avoid damage to DNA. Human cells were used to extract procollagen from cells. Collagen was labelled with fluorescent dyes. In addition to staining and pulse-chase labelling, RNA was also isolated from cells to perform RT-qPCR to determine the amount of mRNA and collagen at different points of time.

==== Viral inclusions ====
Pulse-Chase Analysis can be used to determine how viruses replicate and enter the cell. Researchers use Fluorescence Loss After Photoactivation (FLAPh) in order to study Influenza A virus (IAV) in order to study the cell structure during infection. As opposed to fluorescence recovery after photobleaching (FRAP), FLAPh can determine mobile elements. Viral infections are constantly moving and require a method that can image it while it is moving. FLAPh photobleaches protein components for only short periods of time, making it a suitable method to determine the location of protein and cell components. This was combined with pulse-chase analysis, and researchers used both visual methods to determine the protein decay and location of the virus in the cell through stages of viral infection.

=== Research ===
==== Structure analysis ====
PCA can be used to determine the structure of molecules that interact with proteins. This can be done by labelling a protein and analyzing the length of a chase in an experiment, and it can also be done by analyzing amounts concentrations of proteins after a pulse-chase experiment.

===== Bacteriophages =====
PCA can be used to determine the structure of bacteriophages. Researchers have used pulse-chase analysis and looked at the delay between the "pulse" and "chase" in order to determine the structure and making of the tail of the bacteriophage T4. In this experiment, amino acids were used to label proteins of the bacteriophage. The phage was made up of 420 proteins, and the position of the tail proteins were determined by the length of the chase. The "chase" of the experiment observed the length of time it took for the protein to assemble in the bacteriophage. The more "inward" in a protein a label has travel, the longer the chase will be. The proteins that were labelled were identified through gel electrophoresis. This procedure was repeated until the order of proteins on the bacteriophage tail was determined.

===== Macromolecules =====
Proteins are studied using PCA to determine how they interact with a larger macromolecular structure. This is done through using an amino acid to start translation. A labelled protein is attached to mRNA, and the protein is followed through translation. After translation has stopped, the protein is chased after translation as well to determine the post-translational behavior. The labels can be used to isolate proteins, and the proteins can be washed and analyzed using immunoprecipitation to identify protein macromolecule complexes and other translational materials.
