= Reiji Okazaki =

Japanese molecular biologist (1930–1975)

- 岡崎 令治
- Born: Okazaki Reiji; October 8, 1930; Hiroshima, Japan
- Died: August 1, 1975 (aged 44); Japan
- Education: Nagoya University
- Known for: Okazaki Fragments
- Spouse: Tsuneko Okazaki
- Scientific career
- Fields: Molecular biology
- Institutions: Nagoya University, Washington University, Stanford University

Reiji Okazaki (岡崎 令治, Okazaki Reiji; October 8, 1930 – August 1, 1975) was a pioneer Japanese molecular biologist, known for his research on DNA replication and especially for describing the role of Okazaki fragments along with his wife Tsuneko.

Okazaki was born in Hiroshima, Japan. He graduated in 1953 from Nagoya University, and worked as a professor there after 1963. He died of leukemia in Japan in 1975 at the age of 44 after traveling to the United States and Canada; he had been heavily irradiated in Hiroshima when the first atomic bomb was dropped.

== Okazaki Fragments ==
In 1968, Reiji and Tsuneko Okazaki discovered the way in which the lagging strand of DNA is replicated via fragments, now called Okazaki fragments.

Their experiments used E. coli. After introducing 3T-thymidine for only ten seconds to E. coli during DNA replication, they placed the sample in a test tube of alkaline sucrose. The larger, heavier DNA flowed to the bottom of the test tube, while the smaller, lighter DNA did not. When samples were taken from the bottom of the test tube, it was found that half were heavy and half were light, proving that half of the DNA was complete and half was in fragments. Then he took a sample of E. coli DNA that had been synthesized for an additional five seconds, and found all the activity now resulted in the larger molecular weight. This complete replacement of fragments was later identified as RNA primers being replaced with DNA nucleotides by DNA polymerase I and Okazaki fragments being joined by DNA ligase.
