= Okazaki fragments =

Parts of lagging strand in DNA replication

Asymmetry in the synthesis of leading and lagging strands

Okazaki fragments are short sequences of DNA nucleotides (approximately 150 to 200 base pairs long in eukaryotes) which are synthesized discontinuously and later linked together by the enzyme DNA ligase to create the lagging strand during DNA replication. They were discovered in the 1960s by husband and wife Reiji and Tsuneko Okazaki, along with the help of some of their colleagues.

During DNA replication, the double helix is unwound and the complementary strands are separated by the enzyme DNA helicase, creating what is known as the DNA replication fork. Following this fork, DNA primase and DNA polymerase begin to act in order to create a new complementary strand. Because these enzymes can only work in the 5' to 3' direction, the two unwound template strands are replicated in different ways. One strand, the leading strand, undergoes a continuous replication process since its template strand has 3' to 5' directionality, allowing the polymerase assembling the leading strand to follow the replication fork without interruption. The lagging strand, however, cannot be created in a continuous fashion because its template strand has 5' to 3' directionality, which means the polymerase must work backwards from the replication fork. This causes periodic breaks in the process of creating the lagging strand. The primase and polymerase move in the opposite direction of the fork, so the enzymes must repeatedly stop and start again while the DNA helicase breaks the strands apart. Once the fragments are made, DNA ligase connects them into a single, continuous strand. The entire replication process is considered "semi-discontinuous" since one of the new strands is formed continuously and the other is not.

During the 1960s, Reiji and Tsuneko Okazaki conducted experiments involving DNA replication in the bacterium Escherichia coli. Before this time, it was commonly thought that replication was a continuous process for both strands, but the discoveries involving E. coli led to a new model of replication. The scientists found there was a discontinuous replication process by pulse-labeling DNA and observing changes that pointed to non-contiguous replication.

== Experiments ==
Formation of the Okazaki fragments

The work of Kiwako Sakabe, Reiji Okazaki and Tsuneko Okazaki provided experimental evidence supporting the hypothesis that DNA replication is a discontinuous process. Previously, it was commonly accepted that replication was continuous in both the 3' to 5' and 5' to 3' directions. 3' and 5' are specifically numbered carbons on the deoxyribose ring in nucleic acids, and refer to the orientation or directionality of a strand. In 1967, Tsuneko Okazaki and Toru Ogawa suggested that there is no found mechanism that showed continuous replication in the 3' to 5' direction, only 5' to 3' using DNA polymerase, a replication enzyme. The team hypothesized that if discontinuous replication was used, short strands of DNA, synthesized at the replicating point, could be attached in the 5' to 3' direction to the older strand.

To distinguish the method of replication used by DNA experimentally, the team pulse-labeled newly replicated areas of Escherichia coli chromosomes, denatured, and extracted the DNA. A large number of radioactive short units meant that the replication method was likely discontinuous. The hypothesis was further supported by the discovery of polynucleotide ligase, an enzyme that links short DNA strands together.

In 1968, Reiji and Tsuneko Okazaki gathered additional evidence of nascent DNA strands. They hypothesized that if discontinuous replication, involving short DNA chains linked together by polynucleotide ligase, is the mechanism used in DNA synthesis, then "newly synthesized short DNA chains would accumulate in the cell under conditions where the function of ligase is temporarily impaired." E. coli were infected with bacteriophage T4 that produce temperature-sensitive polynucleotide ligase. The cells infected with the T4 phages accumulated a large number of short, newly synthesized DNA chains, as predicted in the hypothesis, when exposed to high temperatures. This experiment further supported the Okazakis' hypothesis of discontinuous replication and linkage by polynucleotide ligase. It disproved the notion that short chains were produced during the extraction process as well.

The Okazakis' experiments provided extensive information on the replication process of DNA and the existence of short, newly synthesized DNA chains that later became known as Okazaki fragments.

== Pathways ==
Two pathways have been proposed to process Okazaki fragments: the short flap pathway and the long flap pathway.

=== Short Flap Pathway ===
In the short flap pathway in eukaryotes the lagging strand of DNA is primed in short intervals. In the short pathway only, the nuclease FEN1 is involved. Pol δ frequently encounters the downstream primed Okazaki fragment and displaces the RNA/DNA initiator primer into a 5′ flap. The FEN1 5'-3' endonuclease recognizes that the 5' flap is displaced, and it cleaves, creating a substrate for ligation. In this method the Pol a-synthesized primer is removed. Studies show that in the FEN1 suggest a 'tracking; model where the nuclease moves from the 5' flap to its base to preform cleavage. The Pol δ does not process a nuclease activity to cleave the displaced flap. The FEN1 cleaves the short flap immediately after they form. The cleavage is inhibited when the 5' end of the DNA flap is blocked either with a complementary primer or a biotin-conjugated streptavidin moiety. DNA ligase seals the nick made by the FEN1 and it creates a functional continuous double strand of DNA. PCNA simulates enzymatic functions of proteins for both FEN1 and DNA ligase. The interaction is crucial in creating proper ligation of the lagging DNA strand. Sequential strand displacement and cleavage by Pol δ and FEN1, respectively, helps to remove the entire initiator RNA before ligation. Many displacements need to take place and cleavage reactions are required to remove the initiator primer. The flap that is created and processes and it is matured by the short flap pathway.

=== Long Flap Pathway ===
In some cases, the FEN1 lasts for only a short period of time and disengages from the replication complex. This causes a delay in the cleavage that the flaps displaced by Pol δ become long. When the RPA reaches a long enough length, it can bind stably. When the RPA bound flaps are refactorized to FEN1 cleavage the require another nuclease for processing, this has been identified as an alternate nuclease, DNA2. DNA2 has defects in the DEN1 overexpression. The DNA2 showed to work with FEN1 to process long flaps. DNA2 can dissociate the RPA from a long flap, it does this by using a mechanism like the FEN1. It binds the flap and threads the 5' end of the flap. The nuclease cleaves the flap making it too short to bind to the RPA, the flap being too short means it is available for FEN1 and ligation. This is known as the long flap method. DNA2 can act as FEN1 as a backup for nuclease activity but it is not an efficient process.

=== Alternate pathway ===
Until recently, there were only two known pathways to process Okazaki fragments. However, current investigations have concluded that a new pathway for Okazaki fragmentation and DNA replication exists. This alternate pathway involves the enzymes Pol δ with Pif1 which perform the same flap removal process as Pol δ and FEN1.

== Enzymes involved in fragment formation ==
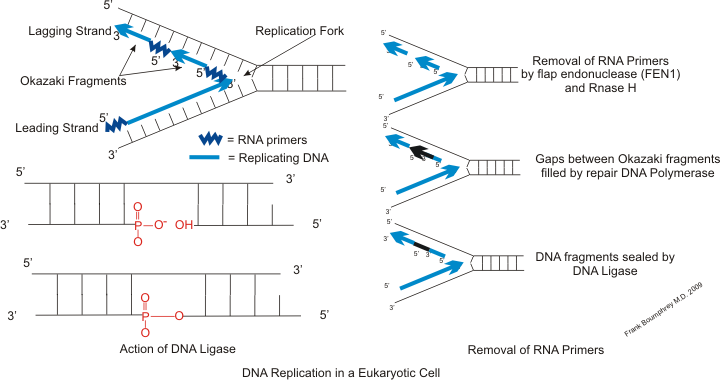

=== Primase ===
Primase adds RNA primers onto the lagging strand, which allows synthesis of Okazaki fragments from 5' to 3'. However, primase creates RNA primers at a much lower rate than that at which DNA polymerase synthesizes DNA on the leading strand. DNA polymerase on the lagging strand also has to be continually recycled to construct Okazaki fragments following RNA primers. This makes the speed of lagging strand synthesis much lower than that of the leading strand. To solve this, primase acts as a temporary stop signal, briefly halting the progression of the replication fork during DNA replication. This molecular process prevents the leading strand from overtaking the lagging strand.

=== DNA polymerase δ ===
New DNA is made during this phase by enzymes which synthesize DNA in the 5' to 3' direction. DNA polymerase is essential for both the leading strand which is made as a continuous strand and lagging strand which is made in small pieces in DNA Synthesis. This process happens for extension of the newly synthesized fragment and expulsion of the RNA and DNA segment. Synthesis occurs in 3 phases with two different polymerases, DNA polymerase α-primase and DNA polymerase δ. This process starts with polymerase α-primase displacing from the RNA and DNA primer by the clamp loader replication Effect, this Effect leads the sliding clamp onto the DNA. After this, DNA polymerase δ begins to go into its holoenzyme form which then synthesis begins. The synthesis process will continue until the 5'end of the previous Okazaki fragment has arrived. Once arrived, Okazaki fragment processing proceeds to join the newly synthesized fragment to the lagging strand. Last function of DNA polymerase δ is to serve as a supplement to FEN1/RAD27 5' Flap Endonuclease activity. The rad27-p allele is lethal in most combinations but was viable with the rad27-p polymerase and exo1. Both rad27-p polymerase and exo1 portray strong synergistic increases in CAN 1 duplication mutations. The only reason this mutation is viable is due to the double-strand break repair genes RAD50, RAD51 and RAD52. The RAD27/FEN1 creates nicks between adjacent Okazaki fragments by minimizing the amount of strand-expulsion in the lagging strand.

=== DNA ligase I ===
During lagging strand synthesis, DNA ligase I connects the Okazaki fragments, following replacement of the RNA primers with DNA nucleotides by DNA polymerase δ. Okazaki fragments that are not ligated could cause double-strand-breaks, which cleaves the DNA. Since only a small number of double-strand breaks are tolerated, and only a small number can be repaired, enough ligation failures could be lethal to the cell.

Further research implicates the supplementary role of proliferating cell nuclear antigen (PCNA) to DNA ligase I's function of joining Okazaki fragments. When the PCNA binding site on DNA ligase I is inactive, DNA ligase I's ability to connect Okazaki fragments is severely impaired. Thus, a proposed mechanism follows: after a PCNA-DNA polymerase δ complex synthesizes Okazaki fragments, the DNA polymerase δ is released. Then, DNA ligase I binds to the PCNA, which is clamped to the nicks of the lagging strand, and catalyzes the formation of phosphodiester bonds.

=== Flap endonuclease 1 ===
Flap endonuclease 1 (FEN1) is responsible for processing Okazaki fragments. It works with DNA polymerase to remove the RNA primer of an Okazaki fragment and can remove the 5' ribonucleotide and 5' flaps when DNA polymerase displaces the strands during lagging strand synthesis. The removal of these flaps involves a process called nick translation and creates a nick for ligation. Thus, FEN1's function is necessary to Okazaki fragment maturation in forming a long continuous DNA strand. Likewise, during DNA base repair, the damaged nucleotide is displaced into a flap and subsequently removed by FEN1.

=== Dna2 endonuclease ===
Dna2 endonuclease does not have a specific structure and their properties are not well characterized, but could be referred as single-stranded DNA with free ends (ssDNA). Dna2 endonuclease is essential to cleave long DNA flaps that leave FEN1 during the Okazaki Process. Dna2 endonuclease is responsible for the removal of the initiator RNA segment on Okazaki Fragments. Also, Dna2 endonuclease has a pivotal role in the intermediates created during diverse DNA metabolisms and is functional in telomere maintenance.

Dna2 endonuclease becomes active when a terminal RNA segment attaches at the 5' end, because it translocates in the 5' to 3' direction. In the presence of a single stranded DNA-binding protein RPA, the DNA 5' flaps become too long, and the nicks no longer fit as substrate for FEN1. This prevents the FEN1 from removing the 5′-flaps. Thus, Dna2's role is to reduce the 3′ end of these fragments, making it possible for FEN1 to cut the flaps, and the Okazaki fragment maturation more efficient. During the Okazaki Process, Dna2 helicase and endonuclease are inseparable. Dna2 Endonuclease does not depend on the 5'-tailed fork structure of its activity. Unproductive binding has been known to create blocks to FEN1 cleavage and tracking. It is known that ATP reduces activity, but promotes the release of the 3'-end label. Studies have suggested that a new model of Dna2 Endonuclease and FEN1 are partially responsible in Okazaki fragment maturation.

== Biological function ==
Newly synthesized DNA, otherwise known as Okazaki fragments, are bound by DNA ligase, which forms a new strand of DNA. There are two strands that are created when DNA is synthesized. The leading strand is continuously synthesized and is elongated during this process to expose the template that is used for the lagging strand (Okazaki fragments). During the process of DNA replication, DNA and RNA primers are removed from the lagging strand of DNA to allow Okazaki fragments to bind to. Since this process is so common, Okazaki maturation will take place around a million times during one completion of DNA replication. For Okazaki maturation to occur, RNA primers must create segments on the fragments to be ligated. This is used as a building block for the synthesis of DNA in the lagging strand. On the template strand, polymerase will synthesize in the opposite direction from the replication fork. Once the template becomes discontinuous, it will create an Okazaki fragment. Defects in the maturation of Okazaki fragments can potentially cause strands in the DNA to break and cause different forms of chromosome abnormality. These mutations in the chromosomes can affect the appearance, the number of sets, or the number of individual chromosomes. Since chromosomes are fixed for each specific species, it can also change the DNA and cause defects in the genepool of that species.

== Differences in prokaryotes and eukaryotes ==
Okazaki fragments are present in both prokaryotes and eukaryotes. DNA molecules in eukaryotes differ from the circular molecules of prokaryotes in that they are larger and usually have multiple origins of replication. This means that each eukaryotic chromosome is composed of many replicating units of DNA with multiple origins of replication. In comparison, prokaryotic DNA has only a single origin of replication. In eukaryotes, these replicating forks, which are numerous all along the DNA, form "bubbles" in the DNA during replication. The replication fork forms at a specific point called autonomously replicating sequences (ARS). Eukaryotes have a clamp loader complex and a six-unit clamp called the proliferating cell nuclear antigen. The efficient movement of the replication fork also relies critically on the rapid placement of sliding clamps at newly primed sites on the lagging DNA strand by ATP-dependent clamp loader complexes. This means that the piecewise generation of Okazaki fragments can keep up with the continuous synthesis of DNA on the leading strand. These clamp loader complexes are characteristic of all eukaryotes and separate some of the minor differences in the synthesis of Okazaki fragments in prokaryotes and eukaryotes. The lengths of Okazaki fragments in prokaryotes and eukaryotes are different as well. Prokaryotes have Okazaki fragments that are quite longer than those of eukaryotes. Eukaryotes typically have Okazaki fragments that are 100 to 200 nucleotides long, whereas fragments in prokaryotic E. coli can be 2,000 nucleotides long. The reason for this discrepancy is unknown.

Each eukaryotic chromosome is composed of many replicating units of DNA with multiple origins of replication. In comparison, the prokaryotic E. coli chromosome has only a single origin of replication. Replication in prokaryotes occurs inside of the cytoplasm, and this all begins the replication that is formed of about 100 to 200 or more nucleotides. Eukaryotic DNA molecules have a significantly larger number of replicons, about 50,000 or more; however, replication does not occur at the same time on all of the replicons. In eukaryotes, DNA replication takes place in the nucleus. A plethora replication form in just one replicating DNA molecule, the start of DNA replication is moved away by the multi-subunit protein. This replication is slow, and sometimes about 100 nucleotides per second are added.

We take from this that prokaryotic cells are simpler in structure, they have no nucleus, organelles, and very little of DNA, in the form of a single chromosome. Eukaryotic cells have nucleus with multiple organelles and more DNA arranged in linear chromosomes. We also see that the size is another difference between these prokaryotic and eukaryotic cells. The average eukaryotic cell has about 25 times more DNA than a prokaryotic cell does. Replication occurs much faster in prokaryotic cells than in eukaryotic cells; bacteria sometimes only take 40 minutes, while animal cells can take up to 400 hours. Eukaryotes also have a distinct operation for replicating the telomeres at the end of their last chromosomes. Prokaryotes have circular chromosomes, causing no ends to synthesize. Prokaryotes have a short replication process that occurs continuously; eukaryotic cells, on the other hand, only undertake DNA replication during the S-phase of the cell cycle.

The similarities are the steps for the DNA replication. In both prokaryotes and eukaryotes, replication is accomplished by unwinding the DNA by an enzyme called the DNA helicase. New strands are created by enzymes called DNA polymerases. Both of these follow a similar pattern, called semi-conservative replication, in which individual strands of DNA are produced in different directions, which makes a leading and lagging strand. These lagging strands are synthesized by the production of Okazaki fragments that are soon joined. Both of these organisms begin new DNA strands which also include small strands of RNA.

== Uses in technology ==
=== Medical concepts associated with Okazaki fragments ===
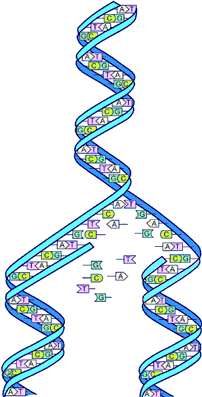
A slight mutation in the matched nucleotides can lead to chromosomal aberrations and unintentional genetic rearrangement

Although cells undergo multiple steps in order to ensure there are no mutations in the genetic sequence, sometimes specific deletions and other genetic changes during Okazaki fragment maturation go unnoticed. Because Okazaki fragments are the set of nucleotides for the lagging strand, any alteration including deletions, insertions, or duplications from the original strand can cause a mutation if it is not detected and fixed. Other causes of mutations include problems with the proteins that aid in DNA replication. For example, a mutation related to primase affects RNA primer removal and can make the DNA strand more fragile and susceptible to breaks. Another mutation concerns polymerase α, which impairs the editing of the Okazaki fragment sequence and incorporation of the protein into the genetic material. Both alterations can lead to chromosomal aberrations, unintentional genetic rearrangement, and a variety of cancers later in life.

In order to test the effects of the protein mutations on living organisms, researchers genetically altered lab mice to be homozygous for another mutation in protein related to DNA replication, flap endonuclease 1, or FEN1. The results varied based on the specific gene alterations. The homozygous knockout mutant mice experienced a "failure of cell proliferation" and "early embryonic lethality" (27). The mice with the mutation F343A and F344A (also known as FFAA) died directly after birth due to complications in birth including pancytopenia and pulmonary hypoplasia. This is because the FFAA mutation prevents the FEN1 from interacting with PCNA (proliferating cell nuclear antigen), consequently not allowing it to complete its purpose during Okazaki fragment maturation. The interaction with this protein is considered to be the key molecular function in the FEN1's biological function. The FFAA mutation causes defects in RNA primer removal and long-base pair repair, of which cause many breaks in the DNA. Under careful observation, cells homozygous for FFAA FEN1 mutations seem to display only partial defects in maturation, meaning mice heterozygous for the mutation would be able to survive into adulthood, despite sustaining multiple small nicks in their genomes. Inevitably however, these nicks prevent future DNA replication because the break causes the replication fork to collapse and causes double strand breaks in the actual DNA sequence. In time, these nicks also cause full chromosome breaks, which could lead to severe mutations and cancers. Other mutations have been implemented with altered versions of Polymerase α, leading to similar results.
