= Flap structure-specific endonuclease 1 =

Protein-coding gene in the species Homo sapiens

FEN1
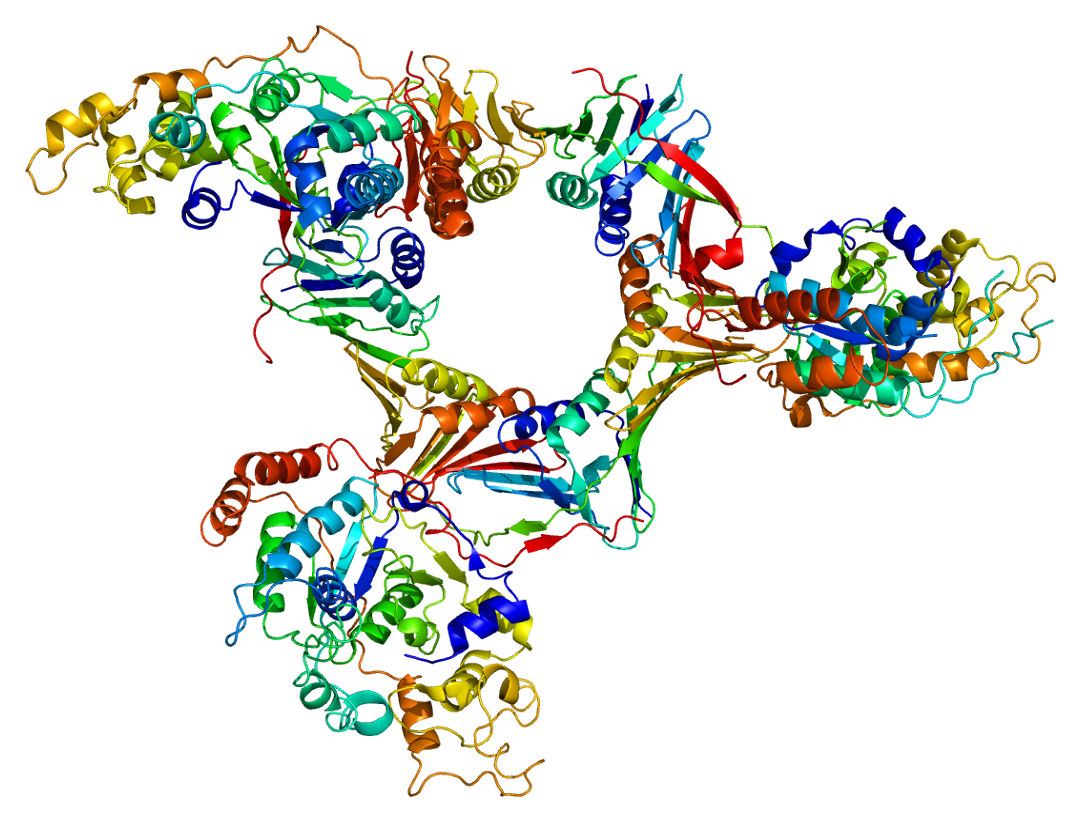

Identifiers
- Aliases: FEN1, Flap endonuclease 1, flap structure-specific endonuclease 1, FEN-1, MF1, RAD2
- External IDs: OMIM: 600393; MGI: 102779; GeneCards: FEN1
Available structures
PDB	Ortholog search: PDBe RCSB
PDB	List of PDB id codes 1U7B, 1UL1, 3Q8K, 3Q8L, 3Q8M, 3UVU, 5E0V

Gene location (Human)
Chr.	Chromosome 11 (human)
Band	11q12.2	Start	61,792,911 bp
Band	11q12.2	End	61,797,238 bp

Gene location (Mouse)
Chr.	Chromosome 19 (mouse)
Band	19|19 A	Start	10,176,496 bp
Band	19|19 A	End	10,181,533 bp
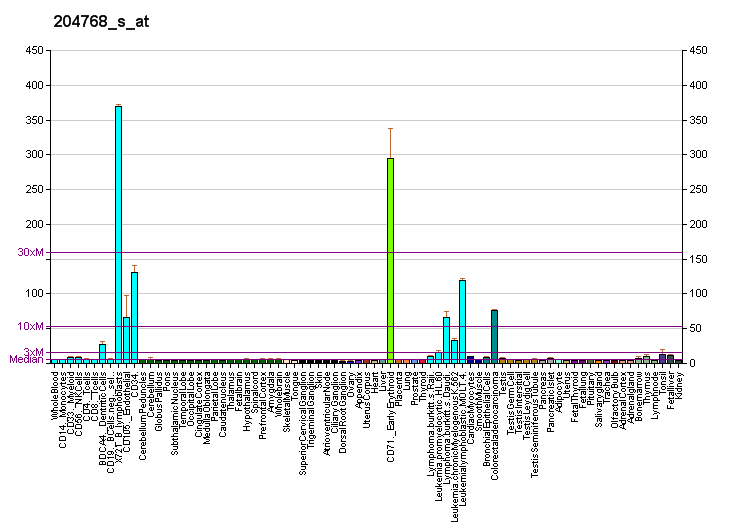

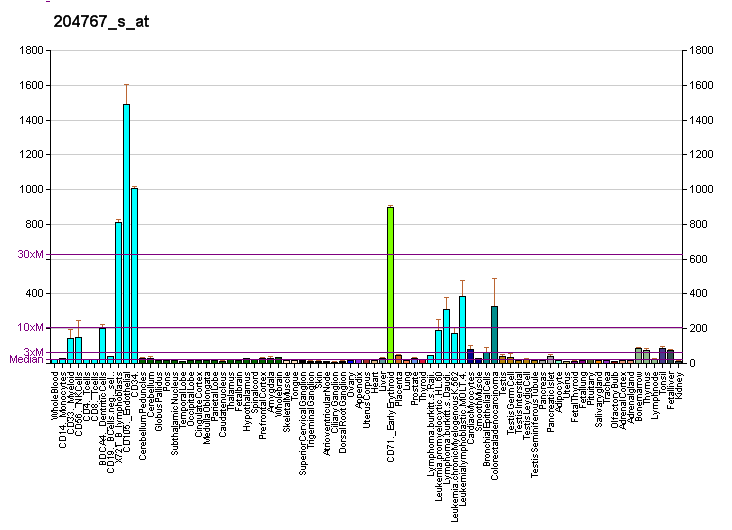
RNA expression pattern
Bgee	Human / Mouse (ortholog); Top expressed in: oocyte; amniotic fluid; paraflocculus of cerebellum; gingival epithelium; secondary oocyte; tendon of biceps brachii; gonad; trabecular bone; bone marrow; embryo / Top expressed in: Paneth cell; ciliary body; primitive streak; retinal pigment epithelium; fetal liver hematopoietic progenitor cell; iris; cumulus cell; endothelial cell of lymphatic vessel; maxillary prominence; motor neuron; More reference expression data
BioGPS	More reference expression data
Gene ontology
Molecular function	metal ion binding; RNA-DNA hybrid ribonuclease activity; hydrolase activity, acting on ester bonds; nuclease activity; hydrolase activity; double-stranded DNA binding; catalytic activity; damaged DNA binding; double-stranded DNA exodeoxyribonuclease activity; protein binding; DNA binding; endonuclease activity; exonuclease activity; 5'-3' exonuclease activity; 5'-flap endonuclease activity; flap endonuclease activity; magnesium ion binding; manganese ion binding
Cellular component	mitochondrion; nucleus; membrane; nucleoplasm; nucleolus; protein-containing complex
Biological process	double-strand break repair via homologous recombination; double-strand break repair; memory; cellular response to DNA damage stimulus; UV protection; DNA replication; DNA repair; RNA phosphodiester bond hydrolysis, endonucleolytic; DNA replication, removal of RNA primer; positive regulation of sister chromatid cohesion; nucleic acid phosphodiester bond hydrolysis; telomere maintenance via semi-conservative replication; base-excision repair; apoptotic DNA fragmentation; retina development in camera-type eye
Sources:Amigo / QuickGO
Orthologs
Databases	NCBI: entry; OMA: entry
Species	Human	Mouse
Entrez	2237	14156
Ensembl	ENSG00000168496	ENSMUSG00000024742
UniProt	P39748	P39749
RefSeq (mRNA)	NM_004111	NM_001271614; NM_001271615; NM_007999
RefSeq (protein)	NP_004102	n/a
Location (UCSC)	Chr 11: 61.79 – 61.8 Mb	Chr 19: 10.18 – 10.18 Mb
PubMed search
- Wikidata
View/Edit Human	View/Edit Mouse

Flap endonuclease 1 is an enzyme that in humans is encoded by the FEN1 gene.

== Function ==
The protein encoded by this gene removes 5' overhanging "flaps" (or short sections of single stranded DNA that "hang off" because their nucleotide bases are prevented from binding to their complementary base pair—despite any base pairing downstream) in DNA repair and processes the 5' ends of Okazaki fragments in lagging strand DNA synthesis. Direct physical interaction between this protein and AP endonuclease 1 (APEX1) during long-patch base excision repair provides coordinated loading of the proteins onto the substrate, thus passing the substrate from one enzyme to another. The protein is a member of the XPG/RAD2 endonuclease family and is one of ten proteins essential for cell-free DNA replication. DNA secondary structure can inhibit flap processing at certain trinucleotide repeats in a length-dependent manner by concealing the 5' end of the flap that is necessary for both binding and cleavage by the protein encoded by this gene. Therefore, secondary structure can deter the protective function of this protein, leading to site-specific trinucleotide expansions.

== Interactions ==
Flap structure-specific endonuclease 1 has been shown to interact with:

- APEX1,
- BLM
- CDK2,
- CCNA2,
- EP300,
- HNRNPA1,
- PCNA, and
- WRN.

== Over expression of FEN1 in cancers ==
FEN1 is over-expressed in the majority of cancers of the breast, prostate, stomach, neuroblastomas, pancreatic, and lung.

FEN1 is an essential enzyme in an inaccurate pathway for repair of double-strand breaks in DNA called microhomology-dependent alternative end joining or microhomology-mediated end joining (MMEJ). MMEJ always involves at least a small deletion, so that it is a mutagenic pathway. Several other pathways can also repair double-strand breaks in DNA, including the less inaccurate pathway of non-homologous end joining (NHEJ) and accurate pathways using homologous recombinational repair (HRR). Various factors determine which pathway will be used for repair of double strand breaks in DNA. When FEN1 is over-expressed (this occurs when its promoter is hypomethylated) the highly inaccurate MMEJ pathway may be favored, causing a higher rate of mutation and increased risk of cancer.

Cancers are very often deficient in expression of one or more DNA repair genes, but over-expression of a DNA repair gene is unusual in cancer. For instance, at least 36 DNA repair enzymes, when mutationally defective in germ line cells, cause increased risk of cancer (hereditary cancer syndromes). Similarly, at least 12 DNA repair genes have frequently been found to be epigenetically repressed in one or more cancers. (See also Epigenetically reduced DNA repair and cancer.) Ordinarily, deficient expression of a DNA repair enzyme results in increased un-repaired DNA damages which, through replication errors (translesion synthesis), lead to mutations and cancer. However, FEN1 mediated MMEJ repair is highly inaccurate, so in this case, over-expression, rather than under-expression, leads to cancer.

== Therapeutic target for human cancer ==
Therapeutic targets for cancers with BRCA1 or BRCA2 defects were identified by analysis of synthetic lethal relationships using Saccharomyces cerevisiae, human cell lines and mice as model systems. Inhibition of the FEN1 repair protein with small molecule inhibitors was observed to preferentially kill cancer cell lines that were already deficient in expression of BRCA1 and BRCA2 proteins. Cancers that often have defective expression of BRCA1 or BRCA2 include breast cancer and ovarian cancer. Such cancers are deficient in the DNA repair process of homologous recombination (HR). FEN1 protein is essential for the alternate DNA repair pathway, microhomology-mediated end joining (MMEJ). Thus, FEN1 inhibition of the MMEJ repair pathway of cancer cells, that are already defective in the HR repair pathway, causes a second repair pathway to be deficient leading to synthetic lethality.
