= Pulse labelling =

Biochemistry technique using radioactive labelling

Pulse labelling is a biochemistry technique of identifying the presence of a target molecule by labeling a sample with a radioactive compound. This is mainly done to identify the stage at which the messenger RNA is being produced in a cell.
