= People's Defence Force (Mandalay) =

People's Defence Force unit in Mandalay Region

Mandalay People's Defence Force
- ပြည်သူ့ကာကွယ်ရေးတပ်မတော် (မန္တလေး)
- Insignia flag of the Mandalay People's Defence Force
- Active: 2021–present
- Allegiance: National Unity Government of Myanmar
- Type: Guerrilla militia
- Role: Armed resistance, local defence, joint offensives with ethnic armies
- Size: Several battalions (est. dozens to hundreds of fighters)
- Engagements: Mandalay clashes (June 2021), Operation Kanaung, Operation Taungthaman, Natogyi ambush, Singu & Madaya offensive

Commanders
- Notable commanders: Soe Thuya Zaw

The Mandalay People's Defence Force (Burmese: မန္တလေးပြည်သူ့ကာကွယ်ရေးတပ်မတော်; abbreviated Mandalay-PDF) is an armed resistance group operating in Mandalay Region, Myanmar. It was formed in 2021 under the command structure of the People’s Defence Force (PDF) established by the National Unity Government (NUG) in opposition to the military junta that seized power in the 2021 coup d’état. The Mandalay-PDF is one of the most active and strategically important resistance forces in central Myanmar, known for launching coordinated attacks, seizing junta camps, and conducting drone operations in collaboration with ethnic armed organizations. The group is led by Soe Thuya Zaw, a former public health officer turned resistance commander.

== Background and formation ==
In response to the 2021 military coup, ousted lawmakers of the Committee Representing Pyidaungsu Hluttaw formed the National Unity Government (NUG), which on 5 May 2021 officially launched the People’s Defence Force (PDF) as its armed wing. The Mandalay-PDF was later established as a regional PDF unit focused on resisting junta forces within Mandalay Region and surrounding areas.

== Operations and engagements ==
Mandalay-PDF first engaged junta forces during multiple clashes in June 2021. On 1 June, fighters ambushed soldiers near a local high school, killing one, and the following week attacked police in Patheingyi Township. In late June, they declared open warfare on the junta after a raid in Chanmyathazi Township resulted in casualties and arrests on both sides.

Throughout 2023–2025, Mandalay-PDF partnered with ethnic allies in several large-scale operations. Operation Kanaung (July–October 2023) was a joint offensive with TNLA in northern Mandalay that reportedly eliminated at least 76 junta troops. Operation Taungthaman (from October 2023) involved coordinated assaults in Madaya Township leading to the seizure of military positions. During the Natogyi ambush in March 2025, Mandalay-PDF claimed nearly 50 junta casualties. In the Singu and Madaya offensives between July 2024 and June 2025, over 64 junta soldiers surrendered as PDF units seized army camps in those areas.

== Organization and composition ==
Mandalay-PDF aligns with the broader PDF structure, which is decentralized into guerrilla squads, platoons, companies, and battalions under regional command centers. The group announced plans in December 2024 to form an additional brigade in Sagaing Region, indicating operational expansion beyond Mandalay.

Mandalay-PDF) coordinates with neighboring resistance commands, including the Northern Shan State Defence Force (NSSDF), particularly in contested border areas such as Thabeikkyin Township.

Women make up approximately 10 percent of Mandalay-PDF’s ranks and fill key roles in administration, medical support, training, and drone operations.

== Leadership ==
The most prominent commander is Soe Thuya Zaw, a former dentist and public health officer from Mogok. He initially led the PDF’s drone unit before assuming overall command. He spearheaded operations such as Operation 1027 and has been central to Mandalay-PDF's strategic direction.

On 15 November 2025, two members of Mandalay PDF's leadership committee, Sang Yaw and Naing Gyi were arrested by the National Unity Government for theft of military assets.

== Strategic importance ==
Mandalay-PDF plays a central role in resisting junta authority in central Myanmar. With Mandalay as the country’s symbolic and logistical heartland, the group’s ability to seize towns and military assets undermines junta control and emboldens both civilian resistance and coordination with ethnic armed forces.

== See also ==
- People’s Defence Force (Myanmar)
- National Unity Government of Myanmar
- Operation Kanaung
- Operation Taungthaman
