= Hla Maung Shwe =

- လှမောင်ရွှေ
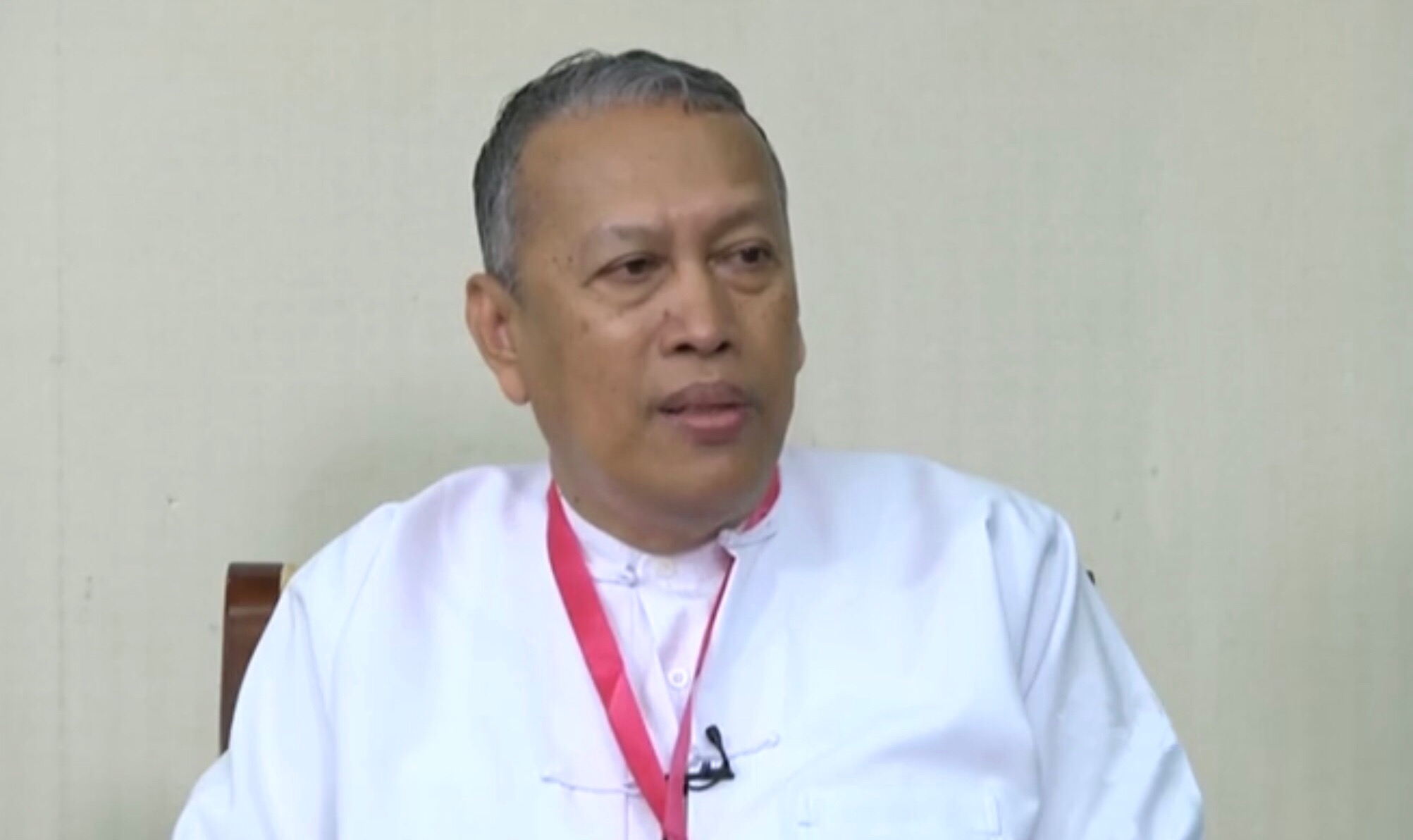

Political Advisor to the Office of the President of Burma
- In office 19 April 2011 – April 2015
- President: Thein Sein
- Preceded by: Office established

Senior Advisor to the Myanmar Peace Centre
- Incumbent
- Assumed office 3 November 2012

Personal details
- Born: 29 February 1956 (age 70) Yangon, Myanmar
- Spouse: Tin Tin Oo
- Website: facebook.com/hlamaung.shwe

Hla Maung Shwe (Burmese: လှမောင်ရွှေ; born 29 February 1956) is the former presidential adviser to President Thein Sein, serving as part of the political advisory group from April 2011 to April 2015. He also served as a senior advisor to the Myanmar Peace Center and as a secretary in the Union Peace Dialogue Joint Committee (UPDJC) under former president Thein Sein. He has continued to advise the government's peace team under Aung San Suu Kyi's government-led administration.

In November 2022, he was awarded the title of Wunna Kyawhtin, the country’s highest national honor for civil servants, by the military government.
