= Ei Thinzar Maung =

Burmese politician and activist

- အိသဉ္ဇာမောင်
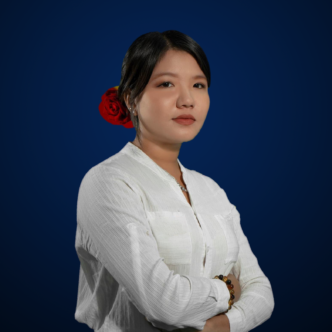
- in 2022

Deputy Minister of Women, Youths and Children Affairs of the National Unity Government
- Incumbent
- Assumed office 16 April 2021
- President: Win Myint
- Minister: Naw Susanna Hla Hla Soe
- Vice President: Duwa Lashi La

Personal details
- Born: 11 September 1994 (age 32) Burma
- Party: DPNS
- Education: Mandalay University
- Occupation: Activist, politician

Ei Thinzar Maung (Burmese: အိသဉ္ဇာမောင်, born 11 September 1994) is a Burmese activist and politician. She is the incumbent Deputy Minister of Women, Youths and Children Affairs of the National Unity Government.

She has appeared on the Time 100 for 2021, along with Esther Ze Naw.

== Early life and career ==
Ei Thinzar Maung was born on 11 September 1994. She obtained a Diploma of Foreign Language at Mandalay University.

== Political career ==
She has been an activist since 2012, focusing on minority issues and joined the All Burma Federation of Student Unions.

On 6 March 2015, she was arrested by police during a protest to amend the 2014 Myanmar Education Law in Letpadan. In the same day, she was released. She was re-arrested on 10 March, and was imprisoned in Thayawaddy Prison. She released in 2016, the same year she chaired the 2016 Student General Assembly. She later served as the President of the Student Union of Yadanabon University.

She contested for Pabedan Township under the banner of the Democratic Party for a New Society (DPNS) at the 2020 election but was not elected. She was among the first to lead anti-coup protests in Yangon five days after the military coup in February 2021.

== Awards ==
In 2022, Maung received the International Women of Courage Award from the United States Department of State.
