= Soe Thuya Zaw =

Myanmar rebel leader

- စိုးသူရဇော်
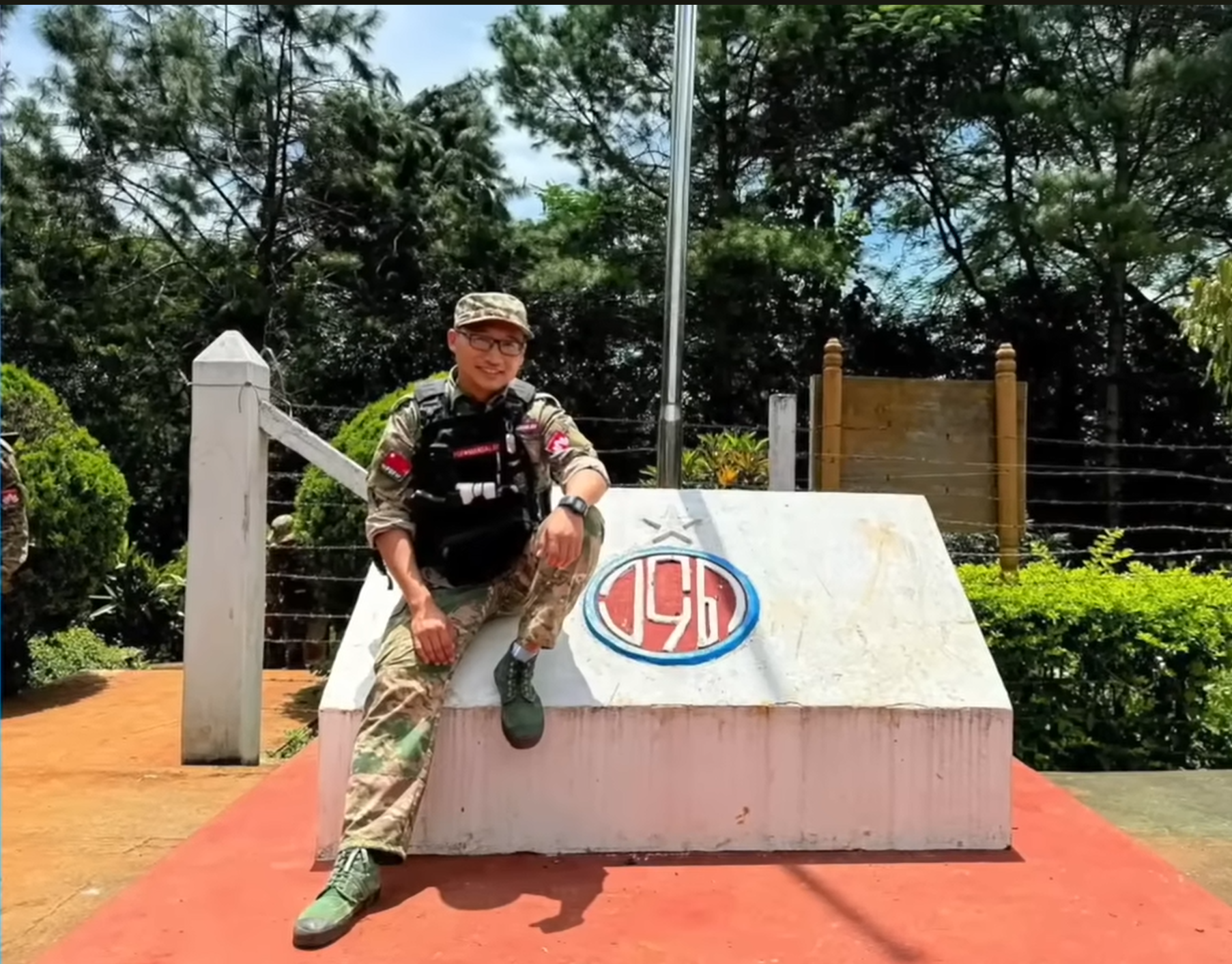

Deputy Chief of Staff of the People's Defense Force Military Command
- Incumbent
- Assumed office 10 September 2025
- Chief of Staff: ?
- Preceded by: Office established

Personal details
- Born: circa 1994 Mogok, Myanmar
- Education: University of Dental Medicine, Mandalay

Military service
- Allegiance: People's Defence Force; Mandalay People's Defence Force
- Years of service: 2021 – present
- Rank: Commander
- Battles/wars: Internal conflict in Myanmar: Operation 1027; Operation Taungthaman

Soe Thuya Zaw (also spelt Soe Thura Zaw, Burmese: စိုးသူရဇော်) is a Burmese dentist, former public health officer and revolutionary. He is a current Deputy Chief of Staff of the People's Defense Force Military Command and a commander of the Mandalay People's Defence Force.

Before becoming a key leader of a major rebel force, he served as a health officer at Mogok Public Hospital and gained prominence as a whistleblower by exposing alleged "brainwashing" and military propaganda in Myanmar’s civil service training institutions.

== Early life and career ==
Soe Thura Zaw was born circa 1994 in Mogok, Myanmar. He graduated from the University of Dental Medicine, Mandalay. He worked as a dentist and served as the head of dental health at the Mogok Township Public Health Department in Mandalay Region. He founded the Dental Donation Group (DDG), a philanthropic organization within the dental community.

=== Whistleblowing incident ===
In late 2018, while attending a compulsory training session for mid-level civil servants at the northern branch of the Central Institute of the Civil Service in Zee Pin Gyi, near Pyin Oo Lwin, Soe Thura Zaw began publishing a series of critical posts on his Facebook page. His posts, which quickly gained widespread attention, accused lecturers from the institute’s political science department of "brainwashing" trainees.

He highlighted several controversial statements made during the training sessions. According to his posts, one lecturer accused the then-government of lacking commitment to the national peace process. Another lecturer reportedly advised trainees against marrying or purchasing goods from non-Buddhists, particularly Muslims, claiming they posed a threat to monogamous Buddhists. He also criticized the training program as an inefficient use of government resources.

His revelations prompted public debate and raised concerns about the militarization of Myanmar's civil service training, which some critics saw as promoting military-aligned ideology. Following his disclosures, Soe Thura Zaw was placed under investigation by a committee of high-ranking officials. However, his actions received broad public support, with many defending his right to speak out and criticizing the investigation. In response, hundreds of former students from the course participated in a social media campaign, posting "We stand with Dr Soe Thura Zaw" on their Facebook timelines. Following the incident, many civil servants, medical doctors, and medical professors expressed their support for Soe Thura Zaw by submitting signed statements. Over 500 signatures were collected in his support. Former Minister of Information Ye Htut also expressed support for the points raised by Soe Thura Zaw. In a post on his Facebook account, he noted that the government under Thein Sein had also attempted to address these issues.

In a press conference, government spokesperson Zaw Htay stated, "The action needs to follow the Civil Servant Act and rules and regulations." He added that whether action would be taken in the case would be decided by the Ministry of Health. Furthermore, if there were complaints or concerns about incorrect decisions made by the investigation team, Soe Thura Zaw could submit an official complaint letter to the President's Office.

In December 2018, then-Minister for Health and Sports, Myint Htwe, announced that no disciplinary action would be taken against Soe Thura Zaw. He described him as a "disciplined civil servant" and emphasized that the government would not punish individuals who serve the public. The minister also noted that the investigation had been improperly initiated by lower-ranking officials without the required prior approval from senior authorities.

In March 2019, Soe Thura Zaw received the Hero Award 2019 from the 7Day newspaper, alongside Police Captain Moe Yan Naing, who had also become a whistleblower in a separate high-profile case involving Reuters journalists.

=== 2021 Myanmar coup d'état ===
Following the 2021 Myanmar coup d'état, Soe Thura Zaw became an active participant in the Civil Disobedience Movement (CDM) against military rule. He was among the doctors who had their medical licenses revoked by the military junta.

He later joined the Mandalay PDF, which operates in Myanmar's second-largest city, and became the leader of its drone unit. The Mandalay PDF drone unit was founded by two engineering students and has since grown to include more than 50 members. He was later promoted to a commander of the Mandalay PDF and participated in Operation 1027 alongside other allied rebel forces. After the revolutionary forces successfully recaptured his hometown of Mogok, he had the opportunity to return home.

On 10 September 2025, he was appointed Deputy Chief of Staff of the People's Defense Force Military Command by the National Unity Government (NUG).
