= Maw Htun Aung =

Kachin politician, social activist and technologist

Lahpai Maw Htun Aung
- မော်ထွန်းအောင်

Deputy Minister, Ministry of Electricity and Energy of the National Unity Government of Myanmar
- Incumbent
- Assumed office 26 July 2021

Personal details
- Born: 1984 (age 41–42) Myitkyina, Myanmar
- Party: Shan Nationalities League for Democracy
- Education: University of Computer Studies, Yangon; Hong Kong Polytechnic University; Cornell University
- Occupation: Politician; Social activist Technologist

Lahpai Maw Htun Aung (Burmese: လဖိုင်မော်ထွန်းအောင်; born c. 1984) is a Burmese politician, social activist and technologist. He is a deputy minister of electricity and energy of the National Unity Government of Myanmar formed by the opponents of the 2021 Myanmar coup d'état.

== Early life and education ==
Born to a small-scale Hpakant jade miner, when Maw Htun Aung was in high school, he experienced his father going bankrupt when the military enacted a gemstone law to make way for military-linked companies to exploit the area. This encouraged him to work on community development activities, providing technical support related to natural resource management.

He got his bachelor's degree from the University of Computer Studies, Yangon. In 2010 he completed his master's degree in policy and social development from Hong Kong Polytechnic University. He also pursued a Master of Public Administration degree at Cornell University.

== Social activities ==
Since 2004 Maw Htun Aung has been working at a number of international non-government organizations such as the Myanmar Compassion Project, World Vision Myanmar, the Korea International Cooperation Agency (KOICA) and Spectrum-SDKN. He has also worked as a country manager at the New York-based Natural Resource Governance Institute (NRGI) for about five years. In 2015 he co-founded and worked as a strategic consultant at Another Development, a research group focused on implementation of public policy.

== Political career ==
Maw Htun Aung joined the Union Peace Dialogue Joint Committee (UPDJC) as technical support for its political organizations.

In the 2020 general election, he contested the fifth constituency of Shan State, which consists of the townships of Mu Se, Kutkai and Namhkam, for the Amyotha Hluttaw (Upper House). Realizing that "there would be a lot of restrictions [in the NLD party] for him if he talks about the rights of ethnic people", Maw Htun Aung represented the Shan Nationalities League for Democracy (SNLD), a major ethnic party in Shan State, at the election. While Maw Htun Aung is ethnically Kachin, he took the unusual step of running for a party associated with the Shan people. He claimed in an interview that this was to serve as an example of inter-ethnic cooperation and to support the SNLD's policies on federalism. Nonetheless, the seat he was selected for within Shan State was one with a sizeable Kachin population. The seat was ultimately held by Aik Mun from the Ta'ang (Palaung) National Party, who had also won the seat once before in 2015; Aik Mun won 49,221 votes (27.38%); Maw Htun Aung 46,169 (25.68%).

That government was ousted three months later in the 2021 Myanmar coup. Some of its members, the Committee Representing Pyidaungsu Hluttaw, formed the National Unity Government of Myanmar on 16 April 2021. Maw Htun Aung was appointed its deputy minister of electricity and energy on 26 July 2021. A week into his appointment, he posted on social media, criticizing the military junta for trying to win international recognition and legitimacy: "Putting a sheep's skin on a wolf doesn't make the wolf less of a wolf".
