= Aung Myo Min =

Burmese human rights activist

- အောင်မျိုးမင်း
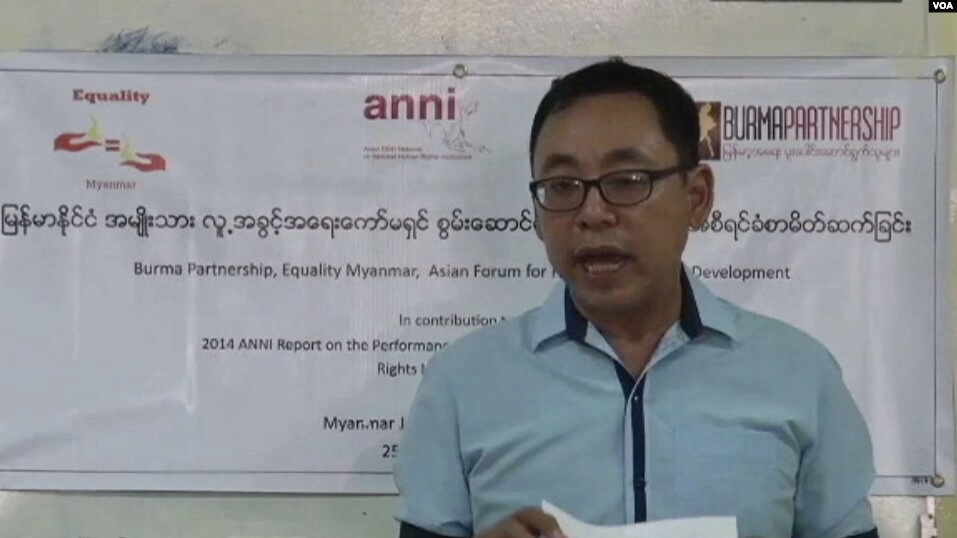
- Aung Myo Min in 2014

Minister of Human Rights of the NUG
- Incumbent
- Assumed office 3 May 2021
- Appointed by: CRPH
- President: Win Myint
- Vice President: Duwa Lashi La

Personal details
- Born: Myanmar
- Party: Independent
- Education: University of Yangon; Columbia University
- Occupation: Politician; Human rights activist
- Website: mohr.nugmyanmar.org

Aung Myo Min (Note: In this Burmese name, the given name is Aung Myo Min. There is no family name.) (Burmese: အောင်မျိုးမင်း, pronounced [ʔaʊɰ̃ mjó mɪ́ɰ̃]) is a Burmese human rights activist. He is currently a human rights minister in the cabinet of the National Unity Government and is the first openly LGBT minister in the country's history.

== Early life and education ==
Until his departure in 1988, Aung Myo Min studied English at the University of Yangon. Later, in 1993, he studied human rights at Columbia University in the City of New York and earned his master's degree in 1995.

== Career ==
His political aspirations first began in 1988, at the time of the 8888 pro-democracy uprising, when he participated as a student activist in Yangon in the nationwide campaign calling for democracy and human rights in Myanmar. At the time, he was in his final year at the University of Yangon, where he was studying for a degree in English. In August 1988, he led fellow activists at student demonstrations in Mudon, Mon State. After addressing crowds every day, he finally left for the jungle, along the Thailand-Myanmar border in Karen State, where he joined the armed student group the All Burma Students' Democratic Front (ABSDF). He served in the Mudon Battalion, or ABSDF Battalion 204. After finishing his education from Columbia University, he returned to work along the border in 1993. In a 2018 interview with FORUM-ASIA, of which Equality Myanmar is a member, he stated that his "passion for truth and justice" motivated him to become involved in human rights. Aung Myo Min became Myanmar's first openly gay activist, fighting against homophobia and LGBT discrimination.

Aung Myo Min founded the Human Rights Education Institute of Burma (HREIB) in 2000, which was later renamed Equality Myanmar (EQMM), and served as an executive director. From 2005 to 2010, he served as director of the Human Rights Documentation Department of the National Coalition Government of the Union of Burma. He is also the founder of the EQMM project Colors Rainbow, initiated in 2007, and a steering committee member of the Myanmar LGBT Rights Network.

After his return to Burma in 2012, Aung Myo Min increased his involvement in human rights activities. He founded theColor Rainbow, an LGBT rights organization, and he is a steering committee member for the Myanmar LGBT Rights Network. On 3 May 2021, Aung Myo Min was appointed by the Committee Representing Pyidaungsu Hluttaw as the Union Minister for Human Rights in the National Unity Government.

He is said to have devoted a lifetime to his career and is called a "sacred human resource" by his colleagues.

== Awards and nominations ==
In 1999, Aung Myo Min received the Felipa de Souza Award from the International Gay and Lesbian Human Rights Commission. He holds seven international awards for the work he has done for human and LGBT rights including, in 2017, the first Robert Schuman Award presented to Myanmar citizens by the European Union for defending peace, democracy and human rights. He was also nominated for the United Nations' N-Peace Award in 2016. Aung Myo Min was awarded the Sydney Peace Foundation Gold Medal for Human Rights in 2023.

== In popular culture ==
The documentary This Kind of Love chronicled Aung Myo Min's life and career after his return from exile.
