= Kyaw Moe Tun =

Burmese diplomat (born 1969)

- ကျော်မိုးထွန်း
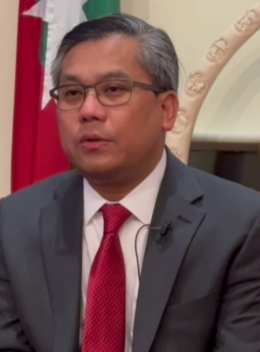
- Kyaw Moe Tun in 2022

Permanent Representative of Myanmar to the United Nations in New York
- Incumbent
- Assumed office 20 October 2020
- President: Win Myint (Note: Appointed by Win Myint when he was the president, and accepted by the UN on that basis. Since Win Myint's removal from politics, Kyaw Moe Tun has pledged his support for and cooperation with the opposition National Unity Government of Myanmar and its acting president Duwa Lashi La. UN official Richard Gowan, however, stated that Kyaw Moe Tun does not represent the NUG at the UN, and an NUG attempt to replace Kyaw Moe Tun with its own appointee was rejected by the UN due to its nonrecognition of the NUG.)

Permanent Representative of Myanmar to the United Nations in Geneva
- In office July 2018 – September 2020
- Preceded by: Htet Lin
- Succeeded by: Myint Thu

Director-General of the International Organizations and Economic Department
- In office September 2016 – July 2018
- Succeeded by: Marlar Than Htike

Deputy Director-General of the International Organizations and Economic Department
- In office 2015–2016

Personal details
- Born: 28 July 1969 (age 57) Myanmar
- Education: University of Yangon; International University of Japan
- Occupation: Diplomat

Kyaw Moe Tun (Burmese: ကျော်မိုးထွန်း; born 28 July 1969) is a Burmese diplomat who is currently serveing as the Permanent Representative of Myanmar to the United Nations. Prior to his appointment to UN, he had served as director-general of International Organizations and Economic Development Department under the Ministry of Foreign Affairs from 2016 to 2018.

In 2021, while Tun was serving as ambassador, the Myanmar military overthrew the elected civilian government in a coup d'etat. Tun remained loyal to the civilian government. The military regime attempted to remove him from his post, but Tun remained in his position at the UN.

== Early life and education ==
Kyaw Moe Tun was born on 28 July 1969. He holds a Bachelor of Arts in International Relations from the University of Yangon, and a Master of Business Administration from the International University of Japan. His father worked for a socialist party associated with the army chief who staged Myanmar's first coup in 1962, ushering in nearly half a century of isolationist military rule.

== Career ==
He joined the Ministry of Foreign Affairs in November 1993 as head of branch/third secretary. He served as Third/Second Secretary in the Embassy of Myanmar in Jakarta, Indonesia from 1997 to 2001 and was posted as Third/Second Secretary at the Embassy of Myanmar in Jakarta, Indonesia from July 1997 to May 2001. After in Indonesia he served as head of branch/assistant director in the Protocol Department of the Ministry of Foreign Affairs from 2001 to 2002. From July 2005 to January 2009, he served as first secretary/counsellor at the Permanent Mission of Myanmar to the United Nations in New York.

He was later transferred to the Embassy of Myanmar in Singapore as Counsellor/Minister Counsellor from 2011 to 2012. He then served as Minister Counsellor at the Permanent Mission of Myanmar to the UN from April 2012 to March 2015. In January 2015, he was appointed as director of International Organizations and Economic Department, and later promoted to deputy director-general in March 2015, and director-general in September 2016.

On 28 July 2018, he was appointed as Myanmar's Permanent Representative to the United Nations Office and other international organizations in Geneva, as well as the Conference on Disarmament. He concurrently served as Ambassador to Switzerland, as well as Permanent Representative to the World Trade Organization (WTO) and to the Organisation for the Prohibition of Chemical Weapons (OPCW).

On 20 October 2020, he was appointed as Myanmar's Permanent Representative to the United Nations Office and other international organizations in New York.

=== 2021 Myanmar coup d'état ===
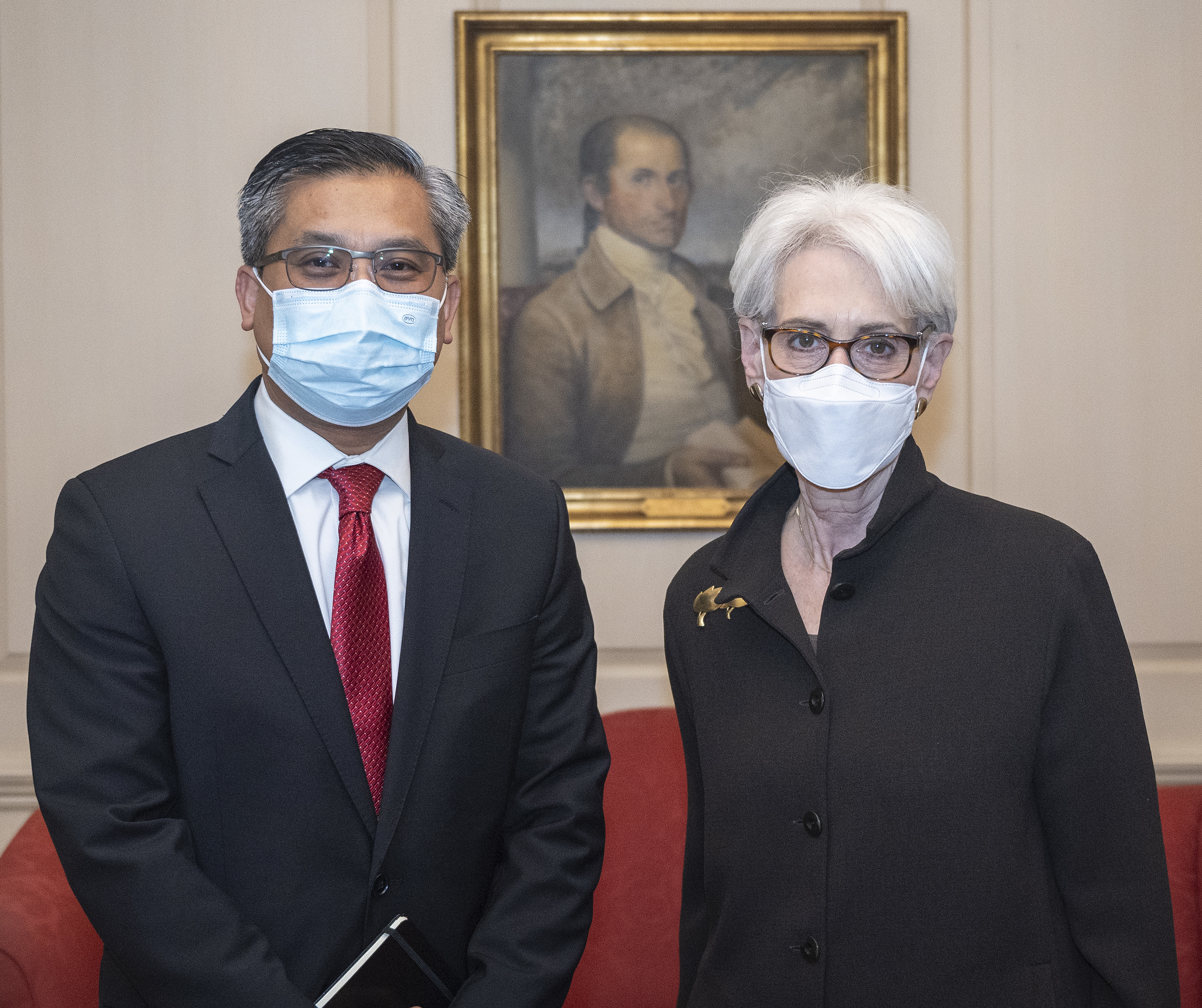
Kyaw Moe Tun with US Deputy Secretary of State Wendy Sherman in October 2021

In February 2021, after the Tatmadaw (Burmese military) seized power in a coup d'état and deposed the democratically elected government, Tun made a speech at the UN General Assembly on 26 February 2021, appealing for international action against the military regime. He said, "We need further strongest possible action from the international community to immediately end the military coup, to stop oppressing the innocent people, to return the state power to the people and to restore the democracy."

He was subsequently fired from his position by the military regime. Kyaw Moe Tun stated his intention to continue to represent the democratically elected government of Myanmar, whose officials had either been exiled, imprisoned, or gone underground. On 1 March 2021, he sent letters to the General Assembly president and UN Secretary-General António Guterres saying he represents the country's legitimate government and remains Myanmar's ambassador. The next day, the military regime named his deputy, Tin Maung Naing, as the new chargé d'affaires in a letter to U.N. Secretary-General Guterres. The two competing letters of appointment went to the UN General Assembly Credentials Committee, and Tin Maung Naing resigned the following day. The United States and its ambassador to the UN, Linda Thomas-Greenfield, recognize Tun as the legitimate representative of Myanmar in the UN.

On 9 April 2021, he again condemned the junta and urged the international community for intervention and the implementation of a no-fly zone over Myanmar. He also regretted what he called "lack of action" of the UN Security Council.

In March 2021, the military regime charged Tun with "high treason" for accepting the appointment of Myanmar Representative to the United Nations from the Committee Representing Pyidaungsu Hluttaw (National Assembly)'s National Unity Government of Myanmar, the civilian government-in-exile. However, the UN rejected the authority of the CRPH to make appointments, with UN official Richard Gowan stating that Kyaw Moe Tun does not represent the NUG at the UN. For this reason, the UN has blocked attempts by NUG leadership to appoint a replacement. In addition to serving as ambassador to the UN, The Irrawaddy reported that the committee had given Tun "additional duties to manage foreign and diplomatic affairs for the NLD government, in effect appointing him foreign minister in exile."

In August 2021, two Burmese citizens, Phyo Hein Htut and Ye Hein Zaw, were arrested and charged by U.S. federal authorities of involvement in a plot to assassinate Tun. The two men were charged with conspiring with a Thai arms dealer to "seriously injure or kill" Tun in an attack on the ambassador in his Westchester County, New York home.

In September 2021, in the leadup to the 76th session of the General Assembly, the UN had been expected to make a formal decision on recognizing the legitimate government of Myanmar. A behind-the-scenes compromise between the US and China, prevented the Burmese military's representatives from attending the session, effectively forestalling a decision to replace Kyaw Moe Tun. In December 2021, the General Assembly's Credentials Committee deferred consideration of the credentials of the ambassadors, effectively rejecting an attempt by Myanmar's rulers to replace Tun.

In the 2022 special session of the General Assembly, Tun as Burmese ambassador to the UN, cast his country's vote in favor of Resolution ES-11/1, condemning Russia for its invasion of Ukraine. This vote was the opposite stance from the Myanmar military regime, which supports Russia.

=== 2026 revoking of status ===
On September 13, 2026, Myanmar's military government revoked his status as Permanent Representative, alleging that he misused state funds and property. The UN's Credentials Committee is due to decide whether or not to allow him to remain in the UN or to accept a regime appointee.

== Personal life ==
He is married and has two children.
