= Operation Kanaung =

2023 armed conflict in Myanmar

- Part of the Myanmar civil war (2021–present)
Date	15 July 2023 – 27 October 2023 (3 months, 1 week and 5 days)
Location	Northern Mandalay Region & Northern Shan State
Result	Anti-SAC victory: Weapons and ammunition captured

Belligerents
SAC; Tatmadaw; Myanmar Army; 99th Light Infantry Division; 101st Light Infantry Division; MOC-1	NUG: PDF; Mandalay PDF; PSLF: TNLA

Strength
~400	Unknown

Casualties and losses
76+	2

The Operation Kanaung (Burmese: ကနောင်စစ်ဆင်ရေး) was a joint operation against State Administration Council carried out by Palaung State Liberation Front/Ta'ang National Liberation Army and Mandalay People's Defense Force of the National Unity Government of Myanmar.

== Background ==
The operation lasted from July to September 2023, and it has been reported that 76 junta soldiers were killed, 19 were wounded, and a large amount of weapons and ammunition were seized.

Myanmar Army's 99th Light Infantry Division, 101st Light Infantry Division and 1st Military Operations Command were targeted in the operation.
