= Nai Kao Rot =

Burmese ethnic Mon politician (born 1952)

- နိုင်ကောင်းရွတ်

Deputy Minister of Defence of the National Unity Government of Myanmar
- Incumbent
- Assumed office 16 April 2021
- President: Win Myint (NUG)
- Prime Minister: Mahn Win Khaing Than
- Minister: Yee Mon

Personal details
- Born: 16 June 1952 (age 73)
- Party: Independent (MSICC)
- Occupation: Politician, former armed group officer

Nai Kao Rot (Burmese: နိုင်ကောင်းရွတ်; born 16 June 1952) is a Mon politician and former ethnic armed group commander. Since April 2021, he has served as the Deputy Minister of Defence in the National Unity Government (NUG) of Myanmar.

== Early life ==
Nai Kao Rot was born on 16 June 1952 in Mon State. He completed his matriculation in 1971 and speaks Mon, Burmese, and English.

== Career ==
In 1972, he joined the New Mon State Party, an ethnic Mon political organisation. Over 35 years, he served in the Mon National Liberation Army, rising from sergeant to colonel. For eighteen years, he was G-3 (operations) colonel on the MNLA military committee and also a member of the NMSP Central Committee. He retired in 2008.

After retiring, Nai Kao Rot founded the Rehmonnya Labour Union (RLU) in 2009, supporting Mon migrant workers in Thailand. The union provided training in computing, agriculture, and labour rights. In 2012, the office was relocated to Mon State in Myanmar.

After the 2021 military coup, he was appointed Deputy Minister of Defence by the Committee Representing Pyidaungsu Hluttaw (CRPH) on 16 April 2021. He represents the Mon State Interim Coordination Committee (MSICC) within the NUG.

In December 2023, he visited resistance forces in Mon State, including the Mon State Revolutionary Force and the “Daw Na” column, to coordinate strategic and operational planning.

== See also ==
- National Unity Government (Myanmar)
- New Mon State Party
- Mon National Liberation Army
