= Northern Shan State Defence Force =

Armed resistance group in Southeast Asia

The Northern Shan State Defence Force (Burmese: ရှမ်းမြောက်ပြည်သူ့ကာကွယ်ရေးတပ်ပေါင်းစု; abbreviated NSSDF) is an armed resistance group operating in northern Shan State, a region known for its ethnic diversity and history of armed conflict. Aligned with the National Unity Government (NUG), these groups are part of the broader People's Defence Force (PDF) movement aimed at resisting the State Administration Council (SAC), the military junta that seized power in the 2021 Myanmar coup d'état.

Unlike a conventional army with a single command structure, the NSSDF operates as a decentralized coalition of township-level defence forces and guerrilla units. These groups often work in close coordination with and sometimes under the strategic command of larger, more established Ethnic Armed Organizations (EAOs) active in the region, such as the Ta'ang National Liberation Army (TNLA) and the Myanmar National Democratic Alliance Army (MNDAA).

== History ==
On August 22, 2021, the Northern Shan State Defence Force (NSSDF) was established as an alliance of seven local People’s Defence Force (PDF) groups across northern Shan State. The coalition included the People's Security and Defense Army, PDF units from towns such as Muse, Namkham, Lashio, Theinni, Nawnghkio, and Kyaukme, as well as the Civil Defense Force – Lashio. The NSSDF was formed to coordinate armed resistance efforts in the region following the 2021 military coup. However, the group later reportedly expelled one of its founding members, the People's Defence Force of Theinni (TNPDF), accusing it of acting as an informant for the junta.

Operating in a region with a long history of armed conflict, the NSSDF functions alongside other resistance forces and within a complex landscape shaped by ethnic armed organizations. These groups regularly coordinate with neighboring resistance commands, including the Mandalay Region People's Defence Force (MDY-PDF), particularly in contested border areas like Thabeikkyin Township. A defining feature of the NSSDF's structure is its close alliance with established ethnic armed organizations (EAOs). Due to limited access to weapons, training, and logistical resources compared to the Myanmar Armed Forces (Tatmadaw), many of these units have formed strategic partnerships with groups such as the Ta'ang National Liberation Army (TNLA), the Myanmar National Democratic Alliance Army (MNDAA), and, at times, the Kachin Independence Army (KIA). These alliances provide essential military training, arms and ammunition, and opportunities for operational coordination. NSSDF fighters have taken part in joint offensives alongside these EAOs, often serving in supportive or complementary roles during larger campaigns against junta forces.

On September 4, 2021, the Northern Shan State Defence Force (NSSDF) and the Southern Shan People Defence Force (SSPDF) officially formed the Shan State Unity Defence Forces, a coalition aimed at unifying resistance efforts across Shan State.

In 2022, Wai Yan Min Khant, a financial officer of NSSDF, allegedly fled to Thailand with his fiancée, absconding with a large portion of the group's funds—reportedly 200 billion kyats (approximately US$571,428 at the time). He later established a business in Bangkok and became a well-known entrepreneur within the Burmese community in Thailand. The NSSDF subsequently issued an arrest warrant for him.

The NSSDF has been integral to some of the most significant military campaigns of the post-coup civil war, most notably the so-called "Shan Man" operation, which formed part of Operation 1027 and its subsequent phases.
