= Nai Thuwanna =

Burmese politician of Mon descent

Nai Suwunna
- နိုင်သုဝဏ္ဏ
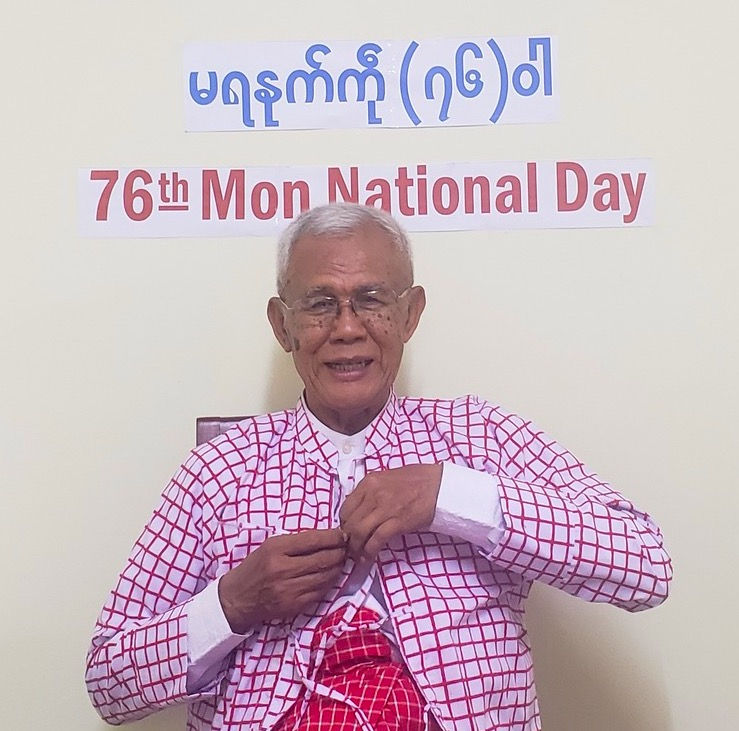
- Nai Suwunna in 2023

Minister of Labour of NUG
- In office 3 May 2021 – 2026
- Appointed by: CRPH
- President: Win Myint
- Prime Minister: Mahn Win Khaing Than
- Vice President: Duwa Lashi La

Personal details
- Born: Myanmar
- Died: 2026
- Party: Mon Unity Party (former)
- Occupation: Politician
- Website: www.nugmyanmar.org

Nai Suwunna (Burmese: နိုင်သုဝဏ္ဏ; died 2026) was a Burmese politician who served as Minister of Labour of NUG and as the president of Mon State Interim Coordination Committee (MSICC).

He was appointed by the Committee Representing Pyidaungsu Hluttaw as the Minister of Labour in the National Unity Government of Myanmar on 3 May 2021. He died in 2026.
