= Esther Ze Naw =

Kachin humanitarian and ethnic minority rights activist

Esther Ze Naw Bamvo
- အက်စတာဇေနော
- Born: 15 February 1994 (age 32); Shan State, Myanmar
- Other name: Ze Naw
- Education: Myanmar Institute of Theology (MIT); Yangon University (YU); Chiang Mai University (CMU); University of York
- Occupations: Humanitarian; Democracy; Ethnic minority rights activist
- Notable work: Time 100 (2021) Kofi Annan Foundation Kofi Annan NextGen Democracy Prize (2023, 2024) Finalist

Esther Ze Naw (Burmese: အက်စတာဇေနော; born 15 February 1994) is a Kachin, humanitarian, democracy and ethnic minority rights activist. She appeared on the Time 100 for 2021, along with Ei Thinzar Maung.

== Early life and education ==
Esther was born in a hilly region in Shan State, Myanmar. After graduating with a liberal arts degree from the Myanmar Institute of Theology, she continued her studies at Chiang Mai University and completed a master of economics degree in 2018. She also received a diploma in political science from the University of Yangon and another in public administration from the University of Basel.

== Social activities and political career ==
Esther started her activism in 2011, after a cease-fire between the Tatmadaw (military) and the Kachin Independence Army (KIA) collapsed. Esther worked in Kachin and northern Shan states to provide assistance to civilians who had been displaced by the renewed fighting.

From 2010 to 2016, she was a youth leader for the Myanmar Institute of Theology, Students Christian Movement (Myanmar), National Young Men Christian Association (YMCA-Myanmar), Kachin Baptist Convention and Kachin Students Fellowship (Yangon). Since 2012 she has implemented 15 mobile libraries, under the name Candle Light Library, at internally displaced people's camps in the Myanmar–China border area.

Esther was also involved in the Nationwide Ceasefire Agreement between the government and the Nationwide Ceasefire Coordination Team (NCCT) as a technical documenter, from early 2014 to late 2015. She served as a Myanmar representative at the Asia-Pacific Youth, Peace and Security 2017 conference and a technical team member at the National Ethnic Youth Alliance. She began work as a peace activist with Kachin Peace Network, participating as a youth coordinator.

Esther was one of the few people who spoke out on the Rohingya issues and protested against Aung San Suu Kyi's defence of the military at the International Court of Justice (ICJ) in December 2019. She criticized the National League for Democracy (NLD) politicians, who won a majority of seats in the parliament, because they "neglect all issues from ethnic areas", making minorities "second-class citizens in our own country". However, following the February coup, Esther led anti-military protests together with NLD supporters, who agree on "the same core demands".

On 15 September 2021, Esther and Ei Thinzar Maung, an NUG deputy minister, were included in Time's annual list of the 100 most influential people in the world for 2021.
