= Khin Ma Ma Myo =

Burmese politician

- ခင်မမမျိုး

Minister of Commerce of NUG
- Incumbent
- Assumed office 16 April 2021; 5 years ago
- Appointed by: CRPH
- President: Win Myint
- Vice President: Duwa Lashi La

Personal details
- Born: Taunggyi Township, Shan State, Myanmar
- Education: B.A (Hons) International Studies; M.A (Economics); MSc in Strategic Studies; MRes Political Research from University of Aberdeen
- Occupation: Politician
- Website: www.nugmyanmar.org

Khin Ma Ma Myo is a Burmese politician who currently serves as Minister of Commerce of NUG.

She was appointed by the Committee Representing Pyidaungsu Hluttaw as the Deputy Minister of Defence in the National Unity Government of Myanmar on 16 April 2021 and later on transferred to the role of Minister of Commerce.

== Early life and education ==
Khin Ma Ma Myo was born in Taunggyi Township, Shan State in 1979.

She has obtained B.A (Hons) in International Studies, M.A (Economics), MSc in Strategic Studies and MRes Political Research from the University of Aberdeen in the United Kingdom.
