= Sai Khaing Myo Tun =

Burmese politician and professor of international relations

Dr. Sai Khaing Myo Tun

Deputy Minister of Education of NUG

Personal details
- Born: Myanmar
- Education: Nagoya University
- Occupation: Politician
- Website: www.nugmyanmar.org

Sai Khaing Myo Tun is a Burmese politician who currently serves as Deputy Minister of Education of NUG. He was also working as a Professor at the Department of International Relations in Yangon University of Foreign Languages.

He was appointed by the Committee Representing Pyidaungsu Hluttaw as the Deputy Minister of Education in the National Unity Government of Myanmar on 3 May 2021.

He received his BA Hons. in International Relations in 2000 and MA in International Relations in 2002 both from the University of Yangon. In 2008, he received another master's degree in International Development from the Nagoya University in Japan. He then received his Ph.D. in International Development in the year 2011.
