= Yadanabon University =

- ရတနာပုံ တက္ကသိုလ်
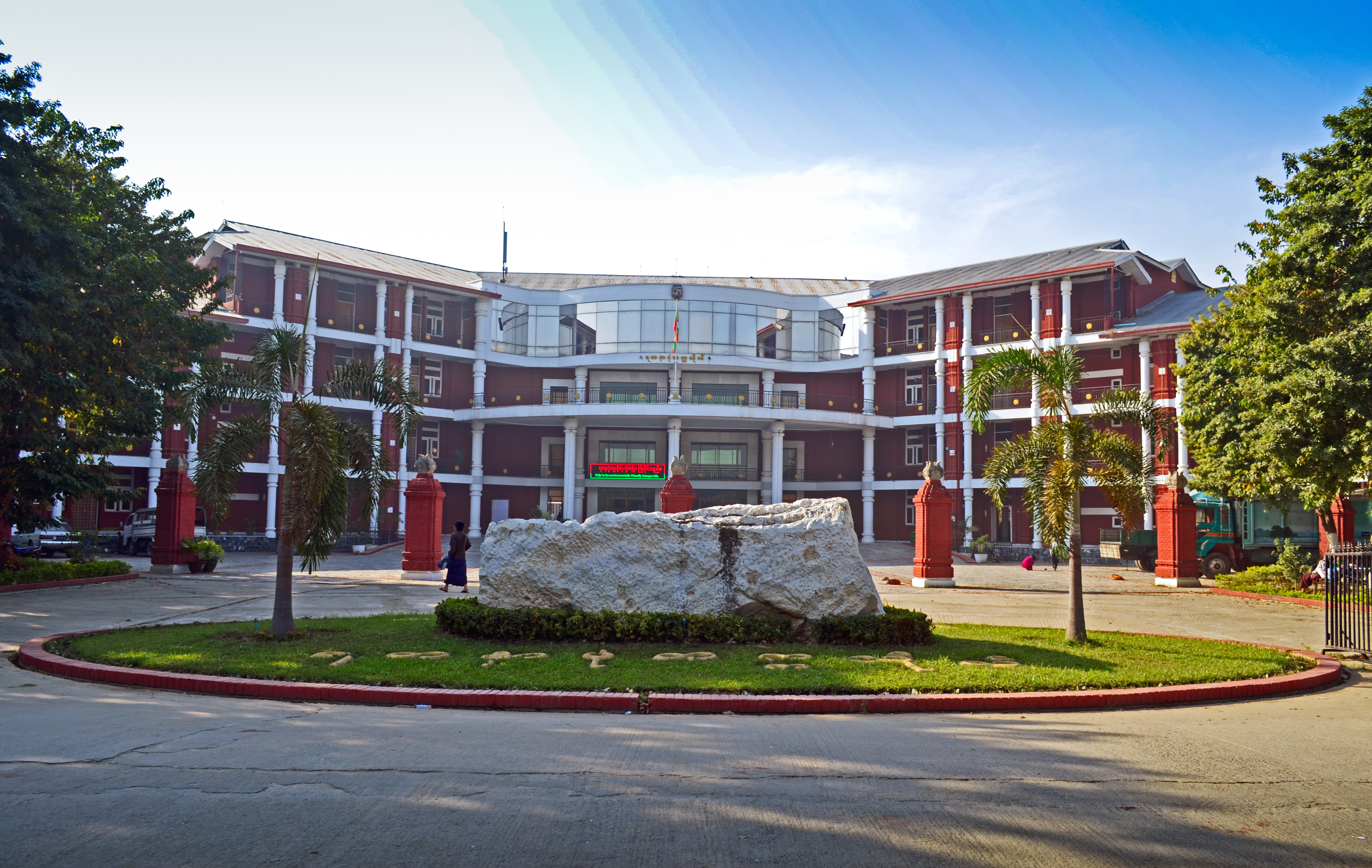
- Motto: ပညာပြည့်ဝ နှလုံးလှ
- Type: public
- Established: 2000; 26 years ago
- Rector: Dr. Aung Aung Min
- Students: 22,000 (2003)
- Location: Amarapura, Mandalay; Mandalay Division, Myanmar; 21°53′28.9″N 96°4′18.82″E
- Website: ydnbuc.org

Yadanabon University (Burmese: ရတနာပုံ တက္ကသိုလ် [jədənàbòʊɰ̃ tɛʔkəθò]) is a public liberal arts and sciences university in Mandalay, Myanmar. Located on the outskirts of Mandalay in Amarapura by Taungthaman Lake, the university offers bachelor's and master's degree programs in liberal arts and sciences, mostly to students from Mandalay suburbs and vicinity.

== History ==
Yadanabon University was opened in 2000 as Yadanabon College in Amarapura in southern Mandalay to serve students from the city's suburbs. The move was widely believed to be part of the Burmese military government's plan to disperse university students across many universities and colleges around the country. All arts and science universities in Myanmar, attended by the bulk of the university students, were closed down from December 1996 to July 2000, following student demonstrations in Yangon. When the universities reopened in 2000, students who would have attended Mandalay University in central Mandalay now had to attend Yadanabon University.

In 2003, Yadanabon College was "upgraded" to Yadanabon University by the military government. The first convocation of Yadanabon University was held in January 2003. The university conferred degrees on 4,148 graduates.

== Yadanabon University Student Union ==
Yadanabon University Student Union was founded in 2012 and it is under the umbrella of All Burma Federation of Student Unions. Ei Thinzar Maung was also a President of this organization in 2012. It also took part in the Student Strike of National Education Law in 2015. After this, in 2017, it was separated into two student unions. Yadanabon University Student Union (ABFSU) and Yadanabon University Student Union (YDNBUSU).

Yadanabon University Student Union (YDNBUSU)

It is the strongest organization of Yadanabon University and there were nearly 200 members before the coup. Before the military coup, YDNBUSU mostly worked on internal university activities and student rights. But they were against the coup and also took part in the protests and anti-dictatorship process after the coup.

== Programs ==
Classified as an Arts and Science university in the Burmese university education system, Yadanabon University offers bachelor's and master's degree programs in common liberal arts and sciences disciplines. Its regular Bachelor of Arts (BA) and Bachelor of Science (BSc) degrees take four years to complete and honors degree programs BA (Hons) and BSc (Hons) take one year. The master's degree programs take two years.

Program	Bachelor's	Master's	Doctorate
Myanmar	BA	MA	
English	BA	MA	
Geography	BA	MA	
History	BA	MA	
Archaeology	BA	MA	
Oriental Studies	BA	MA	
Library and Information Studies	BA	MA	
Philosophy	BA	MA	
Psychology	BA	MA	
Anthropology	BSc	MSc	
Botany	BSc	MSc	
Microbiology	BSc	MSc	
Geology	BSc	MSc	
Chemistry	BSc	MSc	
BioChemistry	BSc	MSc	
Industrial Chemistry	BSc	MSc	
Computer Science	BSc		
Mathematics	BSc	MSc	
Nuclear Physics	BSc		
Physics	BSc	MSc	
Zoology	BSc	MSc	
International Relations	BA	MA	
Law	LLB	LLM	
Sport Science	B.Sc	M.Sc	

== Alumni ==
- Zeyar Thaw, Former political prisoner; MP, Pyithu Hluttaw (2012–2021)
