= Tu Hkawng =

Burmese politician of Kachin descent

- တူးခေါင်

Minister of Natural Resources and Environmental Conservation of NUG
- Incumbent
- Assumed office 16 April 2021; 5 years ago

Personal details
- Born: Kachin State, Burma
- Party: Independent
- Education: Myitkyina Degree College; Khon Kaen University
- Occupation: Researcher; Politician
- Website: monrec.nugmyanmar.org

Tu Hkawng (Burmese: တူးခေါင်), also known as Hkalen Tu Hkawng, is a Kachin botanist, independent researcher, pastor and politician.

== Early life and education ==
Tu Hkawng was born into Hkalen Duwa family of Jinghpaw tribal group in Hkalen Ga, Kachin State. After his father's retirement from First Kachin Rifle (Katha), the family settled in Mayan Village, Moegaung Township. When his father was accused of food supply to KIA and was imprisoned in Myitkyina Prison, they too moved to Myitkyina.

In 1988, when he was a university student, he served as a secretary of Kachin Literature and Culture Committee and led to publish the annual issue of Kachin Magazine in Kachin language. He completed his bachelor's degree in botany from Myitkyina Degree College under Mandalay University.

After receiving a degree of Master of Divinity from the Myanmar Institute of Theology (MIT), Insein, he served as a pastor, youth director and general secretary at the Shatapru Baptist Church.

== Political career ==
Tu Hkawng has been opposing 2008 constitution and conducting awareness trainings for young people since 2007 and thus was on the watch list of Bureau of Special Investigation (Myanmar).

Flee to Thailand in the early 2010s, he got Master of Rural Development Management (MRDM) and continue his study in social science as a PhD candidate at Khon Kaen University. He participated as a research presenter for Myanmar Democratization and Prospect Ethnic States at the International Geographical Union (IGU2013) Regional Conference in Kyoto in 2013. He also served as a member of Federal Guiding Principle Taskforce in Ethnic Armed Organizations (EAOs), and part-time lecturer for Issues in Federal and Peace, as well as in Community Development.

In 2017, he joined the Doctor of Ministry Program, which is jointly organized by MIT and Central Baptist Theological Seminary in Kansas, USA, and got the doctoral degree in Peace Studies in 2019.

Tu Hkawng was a liaison officer for Media and a member of Think Tank Group at Kachin Political Interim Coordination Team (KPICT), recently formed on 15 March 2021.

When the National Unity Government of Myanmar was formed on 16 April 2021, he was assigned as the union minister for the Ministry of Natural Resources and Environmental Conservation.
