= David Gum Awng =

Burmese diplomat and human rights advocate

Deputy Minister of Foreign Affair of National Unity Government of Myanmar
- Incumbent
- Assumed office 9 December 2025

Deputy Minister of International Cooperation of National Unity Government of Myanmar
- In office 16 April 2021 – 9 December 2025

Personal details
- Education: Brandeis University (MA); North Central College (BA)
- Occupation: Diplomat, Human Rights Advocate
- Awards: OSF Civil Society Leadership Award

David Gum Awng is a Burmese diplomat and human rights advocate who currently serves as the Deputy Minister of Foreign Affairs for the National Unity Government of Myanmar (NUG). Since the NUG's formation following the 2021 Myanmar coup d'état, he has been a key figure in the administration's efforts to secure international legitimacy and support for a federal democratic system in Myanmar.

== Education ==
David Gum Awng graduated from North Central College with a Bachelor of Arts in Social Studies, specializing in International Relations and Global Politics. He furthered his studies at the Heller School for Social Policy and Management at Brandeis University, where he obtained a Master’s degree in Sustainable International Development.

He is an alumnus of several prestigious international leadership programs, including the U.S. Department of State’s International Visitor Leadership Program (IVLP) and France’s Future Leaders Invitation Programme (PIPA).

== Career ==
Before entering the ministerial role, David Gum Awng spent more than a decade working in fields related to human rights, sustainable development, and democratic governance. He has been involved in documenting human rights violations by the Myanmar military to aid international legal accountability. Additionally, he has experience managing Official Development Assistance (ODA) projects and providing civic education in conflict-affected regions.

=== National Unity Government ===
Upon the establishment of the National Unity Government in April 2021, David was appointed as the Deputy Minister for International Cooperation (MOIC). In this role, he engaged with foreign governments and global organizations to advocate for the pro-democracy movement.

In December 2025, the Committee Representing Pyidaungsu Hluttaw (CRPH) announced a cabinet reorganization. As part of this restructuring, David Gum Awng was reassigned from the Ministry of International Cooperation to serve as the Deputy Minister of Foreign Affairs. His current mandate includes leading diplomatic strategy and strengthening alliances with international civil society and governmental bodies.
