= Min Zayar Oo =

Burmese politician of Mon descent

Deputy Minister of Planning, Finance and Investment of NUG

Personal details
- Born: November 1, 1976 (age 49) Myanmar
- Occupation: Politician
- Website: www.nugmyanmar.org

Min Zayar Oo is a Burmese politician who currently serves as Deputy Minister of Planning, Finance and Investment appointed by the National Unity Government of Myanmar.

He was appointed by the Committee Representing Pyidaungsu Hluttaw as the Deputy Minister of Planning, Finance and Investment in the National Unity Government of Myanmar on 16 April 2021.

He was born on 1 November 1976, in Mudon, Mon State, Myanmar. He graduated his first degree from Yangon University in 2002. He has also obtained Executive Diploma in Business Management, Professional Certificate in Marketing Management, Certificate in Human Resource Management, Certificate in Communicating Effectively and Certificate in Leadership and Organizational Development respectively.
