= Saw Ba Hla Thein =

Burmese human rights activist

U Saw Ba Hla Thein
- စောဘလှသိန်း

National Unity Government (NUG) representative to Japan
- Incumbent
- Assumed office 1 February 2022

Personal details
- Born: 1969 (age 56–57) Myanmar

U Saw Ba Hla Thein (Burmese: ဦးစောဘလှသိန်း; born 1969) is a Burmese human rights activist living in Japan. He moved to Japan in October 1992 and was recognized as a refugee in 2006. Since 1 February 2022, he has been the pro-democracy National Unity Government (NUG) representative to Japan.

== Early life ==
Saw Ba Hla Thein was born in 1969. He is an ethnic Karen and he is involved in protecting the rights of the Karen people.

== Representative of the National Unity Government (NUG) in Japan ==
On February 1, 2022, Saw Ba Hla Thein was appointed as the first representative of the NUG to Japan.

On September 9, pro-democracy Burmese residents in Japan led by Saw Ba Hla Thein visited the Japanese Ministry of Foreign Affairs and addressed Prime Minister Fumio Kishida and Foreign Minister Yoshimasa Hayashi. They submitted a request to not let the Burmese military government attend the scheduled funeral of the late Shinzo Abe. On September 22, the Ministry of Foreign Affairs announced the planned attendees for the state funeral, and it became clear that the self-proclaimed head of state and self-proclaimed ministers of the military government would not be attending, as requested. No NUG representatives, including the representative office of the National Unity Government (NUG) in Japan, also attended the funeral.
