= Naw Susanna Hla Hla Soe =

Karen politician, social activist and zoologist (born 1965)

- နော်ဆူဇန်နာလှလှစိုး
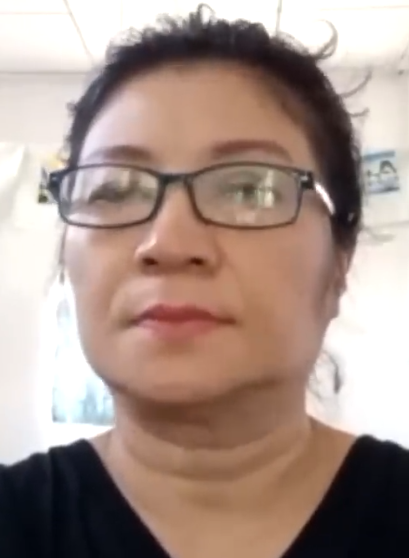
- Susanna Hla Hla Soe in 2023

Minister of Women, Youths and Children Affairs of NUG
- Incumbent
- Assumed office 16 April 2021
- Appointed by: CRPH
- President: Win Myint
- Prime Minister: Mahn Win Khaing Than
- Vice President: Duwa Lashi La

Member of the Amyotha Hluttaw
- In office 1 February 2016 – 1 February 2021
- Constituency: № 10 of Yangon Region
- Majority: 172,295

Personal details
- Born: 18 August 1965 (age 61) Insein Township, Yangon, Myanmar
- Party: National League for Democracy
- Children: one (daughter)
- Education: University of Yangon
- Occupation: Zoologist; Politician; Social activist

Naw Susanna Hla Hla Soe (Burmese: နော်ဆူဇန်နာလှလှစိုး), or simply Naw Hla Hla Soe (Burmese: နော်လှလှစိုး), is a Karen zoologist, politician and social activist who mainly focuses on the development of the lives of ethnic Karen women in Burma.

== Early life and humanitarian works ==
Susanna was born on 18 August 1965 in Insein and got her bachelor's and master's degree in Zoology from the University of Yangon. While she was on her studies, Susanna started as a clerk and later as a project manager at World Vision which promoted her education with leadership workshops and an MBA in NGO leadership from Eastern University, Philadelphia, United States. In 2003, she joined Karen Women's Action Group (KWAG) where she became an executive director in 2010.

When Cyclone Nargis broke out in the Irrawaddy Delta in 2008, Susanna led an emergency relief team to resettle families and rebuild their homes.

Susanna was named Woman of the Year in 2011 by Hotnews Media Group and honored by the Karen Baptist Church as Outstanding Social Worker in April 2011. In 2012, she received the InterAction Humanitarian Award for her "extraordinary leadership."

She is a chairperson of Women's Organizations Network of Myanmar (WON), a steering committee member of Women’s Protection Technical Working Group and president of Women's Peace Network.

== Political career ==
In the 2015 Myanmar general election, Susanna contested in № 10 constituency of Yangon Region for Amyotha Hluttaw, from National League for Democracy, and won a seat by 172,295 votes.

In the 2020 Myanmar general election, she contested for Karen ethnic affairs minister of Yangon Region and won by 106,144 votes (71.75%). But she was not allowed to assume her seat due to the military coup.

On 16 April 2021, when Committee Representing Pyidaungsu Hluttaw formed National Unity Government (NUG), Susanna became the Minister of Women, Youths and Children Affairs. At NUG's virtual press conference, she urged ASEAN and the world's leaders not to recognize the coup.
