= Moe Zaw Oo =

Burmese politician

- မိုးဇော်ဦး
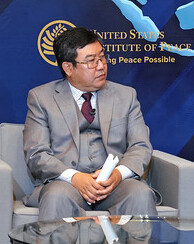
- Moe Zaw Oo in 2023

Deputy Minister of Foreign Affairs of NUG
- Incumbent
- Assumed office 16 April 2021

Personal details
- Born: 1969 (age 56–57) Rangoon, Burma
- Party: National League for Democracy
- Education: Rangoon University; Chulalongkorn University
- Occupation: Activist; Politician
- Website: mofa.nugmyanmar.org
- Nickname: Kay Latt (pen name)

Moe Zaw Oo (Burmese: မိုးဇော်ဦး, born 1969) is a Burmese politician who became a deputy foreign minister of National Unity Government of Myanmar on 16 April 2021.

== Early life ==
Moe Zaw Oo was born on 1969 in Yangon. While he was at Rangoon Arts and Science University, he took part in the 8888 Uprising and joined the National League for Democracy (NLD) in September 1988. He was sentenced in prison for his political involvements in 1990 and released in the year 1999. Moved to Thailand, he received a master's degree in Southeast Asian Studies from Chulalongkorn University.

== Political career ==
When he returned to Burma in 2012, Moe Zaw Oo served as a deputy Chief of Staff to the office of the NLD Chairperson and then became the Chief of Staff of the office in February, 2016.

In 2017, he completed a post-graduate course in International Strategic Studies from the Royal College of Defence Studies, London. On 1 November 2019, he was appointed as an advisor to the Union Peace Commission.

On 16 April 2021, when the NUG was formed, Moe Zaw Oo was named deputy minister of foreign affairs.
