= Lian Hmung Sakhong =

Chin politician

H.E. Dr. Lian Hmung Sakhong
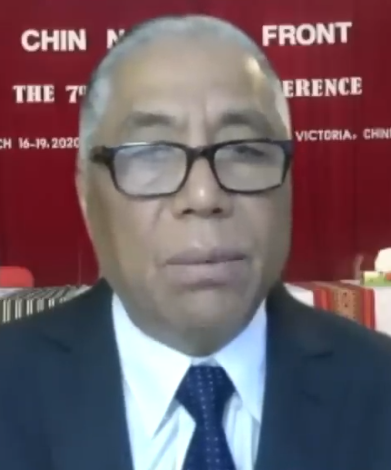
- Lian Hmung Sakhong in 2023

Minister of Federal Union Affairs of NUG
- Incumbent
- Assumed office 16 April 2021; 5 years ago

Personal details
- Born: Chin State, Myanmar
- Party: Chin National Front
- Occupation: Politician
- Website: www.nugmyanmar.org

Lian Hmung Sakhong (Burmese: လျန်မှုန်းဆာခေါင်း) is a prominent Chin scholar, activist, and politician. He currently serves Union Minister of Ministry of Federal Union Affairs at National Unity Government of the Union of Myanmar (NUG). He is also a vice-chairman of Chin National Front (CNF) and of Union Peace Discussion Joint Committee (UPDJC).

He was appointed by the Committee Representing Pyidaungsu Hluttaw, with a mandate from the Chin Consultative Assembly, as the minister of federal union affairs in the National Unity Government on 16 April 2021.

Dr. Sakhong played a significant role in Myanmar's peace process, which was abruptly disturbed by the military coup in February 2021. He was the Vice Chairman of Union Peace and Dialogue Joint Committee (UPDJC), a committee jointly formed by the Government of the Union of Burma/Myanmar and Ethnic Armed Organizations. The Chairperson of UPDJC is Daw Aung San Suu Kyi, the State Counsellor of the Union of Myanmar. He was leading the (10) Ethnic Armed Organizations in political negotiation with the government to end 75 years of Ethnic Armed Conflict in Burma by finding a political solution based on the Nationwide Ceasefire Agreement (NCA) signed in 2015.

He worked as the Chairman of the Ethnic Nationalities Council - ENC (2008-2012), General Secretary of ENC (2001-2008), the Chairman of the Chin National Council - CNC (2004-2010), the Chairman of Chin National League for Democracy – CNLD Exile (2008-2012), General Secretary of CNLD (1988-1990), General Secretary of CNLD-Exile (1992-2008), General Secretary of United Nationalities League for Democracy-Liberated Areas (UNLD-LA: 1998-2010), Secretary of Supporting Committee for State Constitutions – SCSC (2001-2006), and Secretary of Federal Constitution Drafting and Coordinating Committee – FCDCC (2005-2008). He was awarded Martin Luther King Prize in 2007 in Stockholm, Sweden.
