= Myingyan District Special Operation =

2024 military operation in Myanmar

Coordinates: 21.401°N 95.619°E

- Part of Operation 1027 in the Myanmar civil war
Date	10 August – 21 August 2024 (1 week and 4 days)
Location	Myingyan, Taungtha, Natogyi and Ngazun townships of the Myingyan District
Result	Inconclusive: Resistance forces raid a number of junta outposts; Strategic resistance defeat
Territorial changes	Junta forces recaptured lost areas

Belligerents
State Administration Council	People's Defense Force

Commanders and leaders
Thidar Yumon	Bo Mike Khal

Units involved
Pyusawhti	Myingyan District PDF; Myingyan Black Tigers; Natogyi PDF

Casualties and losses
	30+ killed (resistance claim)
- 10+ civilians killed

Myingyan District Special Operation was a military operation led by multiple People's Defence Forces groups against junta outposts in the Myanmar's Myingyan District.

== Battle ==
On 10 August 2024 PDF forces launched an attack on the city of Natogyi attacking junta targets in the town including a police station before having to retreat due to intense airstrikes. On 12 August resistance forces attacked a junta outpost near the pipeline station on the Taungtha-Meitthila road, the Taungtha police station, No. (10) Garment Factory north of the town and militia base north of the town. The resistance forces had to retreat in the afternoon due to intense junta airstrikes. The Sembcorp Power Station was forced to temporarily stop production due to fighting.

On 16 August, the resistance forces attacked a junta column stationed inside a monastery in the Taung Ywar Bo village. On 20 August 2024 resistance forces captured an Air Defense camp near Thet Kei Kyin.

On 19 August 2024 resistance forces captured the town of Ngan Myar Gyi.

== Aftermath ==
On 23 August 2024 the production of power in the Sembcorp Power Station resumed.

On 21 October regime forces recaptured the town of Ngan Myar Gyi in an operation involving ground forces, air strikes and naval bombardment from the Ayeyarwady River.
