= People's Defence Force (Myanmar) =

Armed wing of the National Unity Government of Myanmar

- ပြည်သူ့ကာကွယ်ရေးတပ်မတော်
- Flag of the People's Defence Force
- Other name: PDF
- Founding leader: Yee Mon
- Founded: 5 May 2021
- Dates active: 5 May 2021 – present
- Country: Myanmar
- Allegiance: National Unity Government of Myanmar
- Active regions: Myanmar
- Ideology: Federalism; Democracy; Civic nationalism; Anti-militarism
- Political position: Big tent
- Size: 100,000 (February 2024 estimate)
- Part of: Ministry of Defence, National Unity Government
- Website: mod.nugmyanmar.org/en/peoples-defence-force/

The People's Defence Force (Note: Burmese: ပြည်သူ့ကာကွယ်ရေးတပ်မတော်, romanized: Pyithụ Kakweyēi Tatmadaw, lit. 'People's Defense Armed Forces'; abbreviated: PDF) is the armed wing of the National Unity Government (NUG) in Myanmar. The armed wing was formed by the NUG from youths and pro-democracy activists on 5 May 2021 in response to the coup d'état that occurred on 1 February 2021 that put the military junta and their armed wing, the Tatmadaw, in power. The military junta designated it as a terrorist organisation on 8 May 2021. In October 2021, the NUG's Ministry of Defence announced that it had formed a central committee to coordinate military operations across the country.

According to the NUG statement, the PDF is divided into five regional commands (Northern, Southern, Central, Eastern and Western commands), each mounting at least three brigades. Each brigade consists of five battalions, which divide into four companies. On 13 July 2021, NUG's minister of defence Yee Mon stated that the strength of the newly-formed militia was expected to reach 8,000 by the end of the month. Estimates by The Irrawaddy put the PDF's numbers at 65,000 in November 2022. More recent estimates put the PDF's strength at 100,000, even though not all are believed to be fully armed and trained. The PDF's leadership endorse guerrilla warfare tactics in pursuit of their aims. The military often called the People Defence Force (PDF) "ပဒတ်", especially during its early years of formation, mainly due to their implementation of small, fragmented and guerilla warfare tactics with less sophisticated weapons.

== History ==
Minister of Defence Yee Mon announced on 16 April 2021 that the NUG would establish an armed wing that would cooperate with various ethnic armed organisations to launch an armed revolution against the junta. On 5 May 2021, NUG announced the formation of the PDF as a "forerunner of the federal armed forces". It also stated that the PDF was formed in response to the violence happening throughout the country. On 28 May 2021, NUG released a video of the PDF's graduation ceremony, announcing that the armed wing was ready to challenge the junta's forces. On 7 September 2021, the NUG announced the launch of the "People's Defensive War" against the military junta, and urged the citizens to revolt against the junta in every corner of the country.

On 7 September 2022, NUG acting president Duwa Lashi La gave a speech on the one-year anniversary of the defensive war. He stated that the PDF suffered from 1,500 casualties within one year after the declaration, and that the junta was losing their territorial control. The NUG also stated that 2023 would be an important year as they would "successfully end the revolution in that year and six battlefronts would be opened to do so".

Starting from 2023, local PDFs have been reportedly planning to perform coordinated attacks against the regime as a "Phase 2 of the NUG's one year plan". On 5 May 2023, the NUG stated that around 300 battalions and columns have been established nationwide, as well as local PDFs in 250 townships. Duwa Lashi La also stated that the combating strength of the PDF is "now greater than that of the regime", and the PDF soldiers need equipment to defend against the regime's airstrike attacks. On 1 June 2023, the NUG announced the formation of the 5101st Battalion, the first military battalion based in Yangon Region.

=== Yangon Region clashes ===
On 14 August 2021, the PDF ambushed six heavily armed policemen who were travelling along the Yangon Circular Railway. Five were killed. A sixth was injured but survived. Four automatic rifles were seized.

=== Shan State clashes ===
The PDF clashed with the Tatmadaw in Muse on 23 May 2021, killing at least 13 members of Myanmar's security forces. Another clash happened in the town of Moebyel, in which 20 members of the police force were killed.

On 20 January 2024, the Tatmadaw and the Pa-O National Army (PNA) attempted to confiscate the Pa-O National Liberation Army (PNLA)'s weapons. A few days later, firefight broke out in Hopong Township. On 24 January 2024, the PNLA, local PDF forces, and the KNDF attacked the PNO/Junta-controlled town of Hsi Hseng. The Tatmadaw responded with airstrikes and shelling. PNLA retaliated with KNDF and local PDF forces and attacked the town of Hsi Hseng, Shan State eventually capturing it on 26 January 2024.

=== Chin State clashes ===
Chin State saw some of the earliest armed resistance. Clashes were reported initially in late March 2021. Armed with traditional tumi guns, ethnic Chin inflicted casualties on the Tatmadaw. In early April 2021, Chinland Defense Force (CDF) was established. The Tatmadaw saw heavy casualties in clashes with Mindat branch of the CDF in late April and May 2021. CDF Mindat briefly occupied the town, but was forced to withdraw when the Tatmadaw used civilians as shields.

Chin National Army, the existing Chin armed organisation, various township branches of the CDF and Chin National Defence Force (an armed Chin organization formed after the coup) came together to form a joint defence coordination body called Chinland Joint Defense Committee (CJDC). The total strength of active personnel under the command of CJDC was approximated to be around 13,000. From August to October 2021, it was reported that at least 40 clashes occurred between junta troops and CDF. CJDC claimed that at least 1,029 Tatmadaw soldiers were killed in the clashes and lost 58 of their own in 2021.

=== Karenni State clashes ===
Karenni PDF launched attacks in Demoso and Bawlakhe townships, killing at least twenty Tatmadaw soldiers and police and burning down three outposts on 26 May 2021. The Tatmadaw retaliated by shelling residential areas.

On 31 May 2021, Karenni Nationalities Defence Force (KNDF) was formed as a merger of scattered PDF groups in the Karenni state and some local Ethnic Armed Organisations. The main organisation was Karenni National Progressive Party.

=== Sagaing clashes ===
The PDF, along with the Kachin Independence Army, began assaults on the Tatmadaw positions in Katha, Sagaing around the end of May 2021, killing eight regime soldiers and injuring thirteen. On 24 and 26 June 2021, combined PDF and KIA forces clashed with the Tatmadaw, reportedly killing at least 44 regime troops.

On 15 January 2022, a combined force of PDF and All Burma Students' Democratic Front attacked two Tatmadaw ships approaching Katha from Shwegu using rocket-propelled grenades. This confrontation marks the first time ABSDF had engaged the Tatmadaw since the beginning of the coup, entering a war against the regime and openly siding with the PDF.

On 1 February 2023, a local PDF shot down a Tatmadaw Mi-17 helicopter during a clash in Shwepyiaye, Homalin Township. On 8 and 9 February, a coalition of local PDFs, under the leadership of the NUG's defence ministry, launched an attack on "15 military targets in the region", killing 44 and injuring 8 regime troops. During the attack, 2 PDF soldiers were killed and 13 were injured.

On 19 March 2023, the Chindwin Attack Force shelled the headquarters of the Northwestern Command in Monywa, as the junta leader Min Aung Hlaing was reportedly visiting there. Five out of eight mortar shells exploded on the checkpoint gates, and the regime troops are said to have retaliated with chemical bombs.

On 3 November 2023, the PDF and the KIA launched an offensive in Kawlin. The offensive took four days, ending with the defending junta troops surrendering with the white flag. On 6 November, the NUG announced that they were able to seize the town and posted a photo of the PDF flag being flown at the Kawlin District Administration Department. This was the first district-level town that the PDF was able to take over.

In December 2023, KNA and PDF seized a base in Tamu township, Sagaing Region.

In the evening of 3 February 2024, the Tatmadaw forces began launching offensives from the north and south of Kawlin in order to recapture the town. The Tatmadaw was also reportedly using the Howitzer cannon and air support during the offensive. On 13 February, the PDF troops had to retreat and the junta was able to recapture the town.

=== Mandalay clashes ===
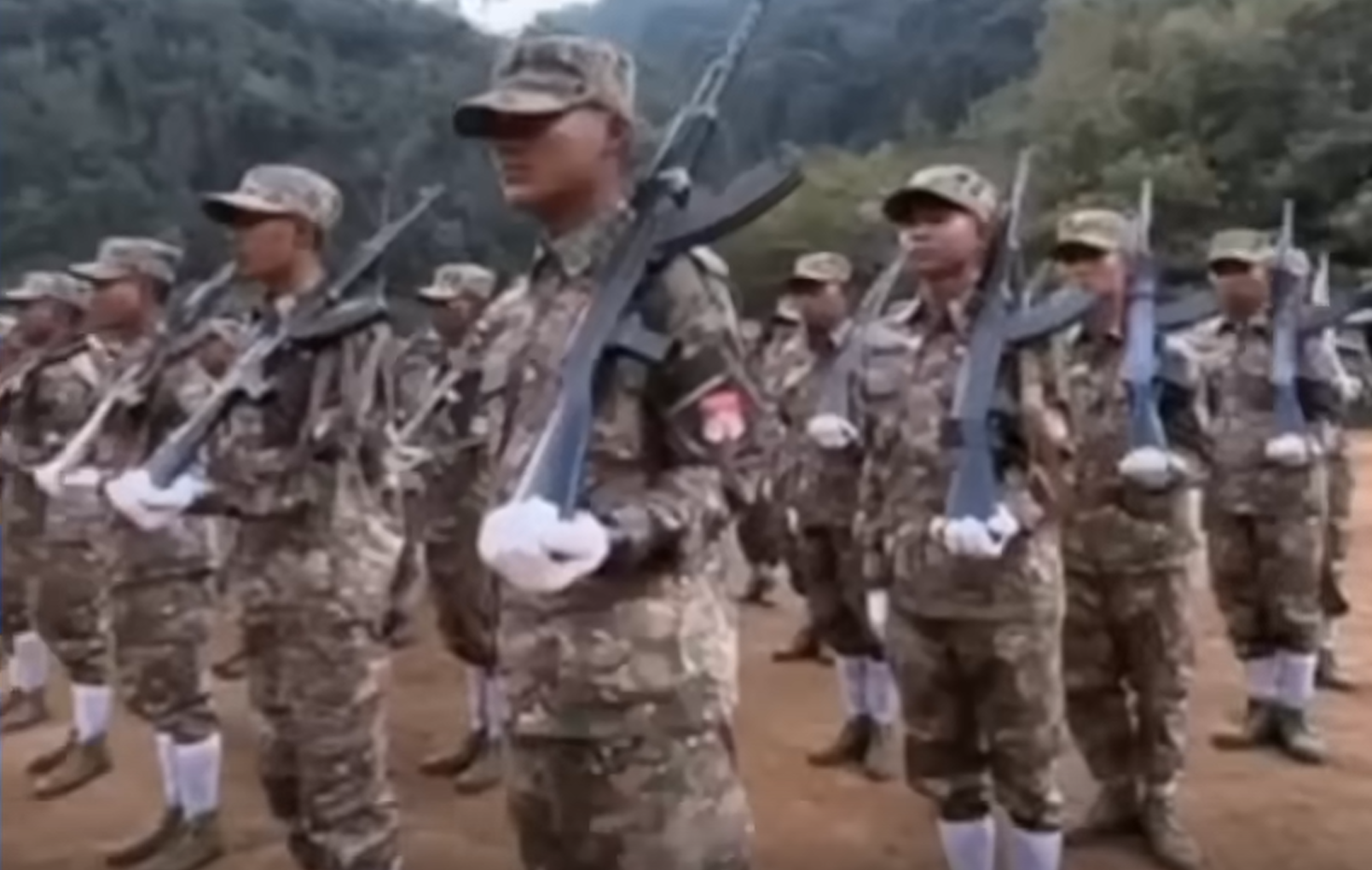
Mandalay PDF Soldiers during a drill.

In early June 2021, PDF activities increased significantly across the Mandalay District, with multiple violent clashes with pro-junta security forces reported in Mandalay City and surrounding townships.

On 1 June, a PDF fighter shot two soldiers, killing one, outside of a high school that had been forced to re-open by junta authorities despite a nationwide boycott of government-run schools. The leader of the PDF in Mandalay, Bo Nat Khat, also claimed responsibility for recent bombings in five townships. The military junta called the PDF attacks acts of terrorism.

In Patheingyi Township on 8 June, three PDF fighters in a vehicle rammed two police officers on motorbikes before shooting and killing them. The PDF claimed responsibility for the attack, which was confirmed by a pro-democracy police officer.

On 22 June, the Tatmadaw forces in armoured vehicles raided a PDF base in Chanmyathazi Township, resulting in the deaths of two fighters and six arrests, according to the PDF. The Tatmadaw-owned media sources claimed that four PDF fighters were killed and eight arrested, while some security forces were injured. Later that day, the Mandalay PDF spokesperson announced that the group had "declared war" on the junta.

On 23 April 2023, the NUG Defence Ministry stated that clashes between the Mandalay PDF and the junta occurred from 5 to 22 April. These clashes were in Pyin Oo Lwin and Nawnghkio, and resulted in the deaths of around 100 regime troops and 11 PDF troops.

=== Natogyi clashes ===
In February 2025, clashes were reported in Natogyi Township in the Mandalay Region, where forces of the People's Defence Forces (PDF) engaged a column of the Tatmadaw troops. According to statements from the PDF, at least 22 soldiers were killed and eight were captured during an ambush.

The attack reportedly targeted a military unit of around 50 personnel from Light Infantry Division 99 operating between Mya Taung and Sein Pan Khan village. Despite the use of air support, including a Mi-35 helicopter, resistance forces stated that they were able to seize weapons and ammunition from the troops.

The operation was described by the PDF's No. 1 Military Region as part of broader coordinated activities with local resistance groups. It was also linked to the Myingyan District Special Operation, which had been launched earlier as a coordinated campaign in central Myanmar's plains.

=== Other activities ===
In early June 2021, a combined force of five armed groups; the Democratic Karen Buddhist Army (DKBA) splinter group, PDF, KNU/KNLA Peace Council (KPC), Karen National Defence Organisation (KNDO) and a Karen Border Guard Force (BGF) splinter group clashed with the Tatmadaw and Karen BGF in Phlu village, Karen state. Brigadier General Saw Kyaw Thet, commander-in-chief of the DKBA splinter group stated that the five armed groups are cooperating throughout Karen.

A villager of Kin Ma, Magway, reported on 15 June 2021 that PDF forces had clashed with security forces in the village. Following this incident, the Tatmadaw forces burned down the village, killing at least two. The PDF, allied with Thanbyuzayat PDF together destroyed military junta owned business Mytel's telecom tower, located in Thanbyuzayat Township, on 1 October.

On 15 March, in an interview published by Irrawaddy Media, "If the last six months of the people's resistance were to be considered as the first stage of the revolution, at this stage the PDF comrades will be involved in guerrilla warfare," he said. "They have been able to carry out effective war operations. They were able to destroy the enemy force on a daily basis. Now our PDFs have taken control of many rural areas."

On 27 March 2023, during the Armed Forces Day ceremony, the Yangon Revolution Force performed a cursing ritual by using a cutout of Min Aung Hlaing's head. The YRF said they performed this ritual so that "the regime would suffer for what they have done to the civilians in northern Myanmar and they quickly reach their demise".

On 11 April 2023, in the middle of a clash between the Mandalay PDF and the Tatmadaw, the PDF soldiers encountered Mong Pong Sayadaw, who was going to Minelon Subtownship. The PDF soldiers stopped shooting, and the Buddhist monk reportedly gave them lucky charms. On 22 April, the Mandalay PDF released the video footage of the encounter and stated that they had escorted him to safety.

In the morning of 28 January 2024, the flag of the PDF was hoisted at the Circular Road around Kandawgyi Park in Pyin Oo Lwin. A local commandant was summoned by the junta and reportedly punished due to this incident. Security in Pyin Oo Lwin has been intensified, since the PDF has been planning to launch offensives in the town and it also has military service academies such as the DSA and DSTA.

== Structure ==
On 28 May 2023, the Ministry of Defence published a report on the situation of the defensive war. The report also provided a few details of the structure of the PDF.

=== Regional Commands ===
The PDF was originally intended to be divided into five regional commands, but the ministry has readjusted into three commands. These are the Northern, Central, and Southern commands. The intended structure of a regional command is as follows:

Regional Command (Division)

- Brigade (at least 3)
  - Infantry Battalion × 3
  - Artillery Battalion × 1
  - Special Commando Battalion × 1
    - Company × 4
      - Platoon × 3
        - Squad × 3 (10 soldiers)

=== Military Regions ===
The defence ministry, alongside the allied Ethnic Armed Organisations (EAO) also have established three military regions (စစ်ဒေသ).

- 1st Military Region – Kachin, Chin and northern Shan State, Sagaing, Magway and Mandalay Region
- 2nd Military Region – Karen, Karenni and Mon State, Tanintharyi, Irrawaddy, Bago and Yangon Region
- 3rd Military Region – Naypyitaw and nearby areas

The 2nd and 3rd military regions are currently combined into the Southern Military Region and led by the ministry and two EAOs.

=== Known PDF units ===
The PDF includes three different types of armed groups, namely regular PDFs, Local Defense Forces (LDFs) and People's Defense Teams (PaKhaPha/PDTs). The regular PDFs are similar to full military units, comperatively large and well equipped, were recognized by and operate under the command of the NUG. Some regular PDFs also operate under the umbrella of NUG-aligned EAOs. The LDFs are local, autonomous militias which are loyal to the NUG but do not directly follow its orders, while the PDTs act as localized guerilla groups. By late 2022, there were 300 PDF battalions, over 400 LDFs, while PDTs operated in 250 out of 330 townships. Known large PDFs include:

- Generation Z Youth Army (GZA)
- Southern YSO PDF units
- Minbu District Battalions

=== Restructuring ===
After a meeting that lasted from 23 August to 25 August, the NUG's MOD reorganized the PDF into 10 Military Regions.

- Sagaing Military Region
- Mandalay Military Region
- Magway Military Region
- Southern Shan–Kayah (Karenni) Military Region
- Naypyidaw Military Region
- Bago Military Region
- Yangon Military Region
- Ayeyarwady Military Region
- Tanintharyi Military Region
- Special Military Region

== Tatmadaw defections ==
The Burmese military has experienced increased defections to the civil disobedience movement and the PDF since the coup. NUG and PDF groups launched propaganda and psychological warfare campaigns. The Army sentences defectors it catches to death, which are then commuted to life in prison.

In August 2021, the Thunder Guerrilla Force was established and the militia is said to be led by the CDM police officers and the Tatmadaw personnel. As of April 2023, the TGF has established 4 battalions.

By September 2021, the number of defectors had risen to 1,500 soldiers and 500 police officers, most of whom were privates and sergeants. Notable among them was Brigadier-General Phyo Thant, who led the Northwest Command until October 2021 when he was detained by the military after his plans to defect were exposed. Sagaing Region and Chin State, which are part of the Northwest Command, saw armed resistance from the PDF.

As of 15 February 2022, the number of defectors had risen to over 16,000 soldiers and police officers who had joined Myanmar's Civil Disobedience Movement. 75% of defectors expressed their willingness to join the PDF earlier that month.

== Infighting and drug trafficking allegations ==
Some PDF units clashed with Local PDF factions (who have not pledged allegiance to the NUG) over territorial disputes and extortion accusations. Other LPDF members were allegedly involved in crime sprees located in NUG-controlled areas.

Chinland Defense Force-Hakha arrested members of the Yinmabin PDF Battalion 15 on the 8th of July 2025 for smuggling meth and heroin. On 26 August, NUG's Central Military Command served an arrest warrant on a commander of the Yinmabin PDF Battalion 14 and charged him with drug trafficking.

On 26 June 2026, Bo Syaung, an assistant of the Yinmarbin District Commander, allegedly killed Yinmarbin Battalion 6 Commander Pale Maung. The NUG later arrested him pending trial.

On 29 June 2026, PDF Battalion 22 raided three camps of a People's Security Force (PSF) unit led by Ko Ar Kuu in Monywa Township. U Kyaw Ni, NUG's Deputy Home Affairs Minister, claimed Battalion 22 initiated the raid without authorization from central command. Although NUG claimed that Ko Ar Kuu and 4 PSF members were killed, PSF representatives claimed only 3 PSF bodies and 2 dead civilians were recovered. Since 9 June, Ko Ar Kuu's PSF unit faced accusations of extortion and ransoming civilians. U Kyaw Ni acknowledged that NUG has not yet found conclusive evidence of the allegations.

== Equipment ==
The PDF operates using a mixture of makeshift, locally-manufactured, and foreign-manufactured small arms. Many PDF subgroups initially used makeshift bolt-action rifles. As of 2022, some subgroups used homemade hunting rifles, while many PDF troops were not armed at all. By the middle of 2023, they were increasingly armed with better firearms. Many PDF battalions used assault rifles seized from military troops in ambushes and joint-operations with local ethnic armed organizations. Seized weapons consist of the MK-II (locally-manufactured Galil variant) and the MK-III bullpup rifles. PDF groups also use the MA-1/MA-3/MA-4 assault rifles with the MA-11 assault rifle (locally-manufactured HK-33 variant). PDF may use arms identical to those used by ethnic armed organizations such as the Karen National Liberation Army and the Kachin Independence Army, which include variants of the M-16, the Type 56 assault rifle and the Kachin-manufactured variant of the Chinese Type 81 assault rifle. PDF groups have acquired large quantities of Wa- and Chinese-manufactured weapons from Wa State.

A variety of smuggled small arms, many of them from either Thailand, India, or China, have also been reported. They include the Ultimax, various AR-15s, Type 63 rifles, FN FAL rifles, and Turkish semi-auto shotguns.

In January 2022, the PDF launched its own small arms manufacturing operations. It began to mass-produce the FGC-9 PCC through 3D printing, a semiautomatic carbine that operates on 9mm cartridges. Over 70 workshops were manufacturing rudimentary weapons by April 2022. An organization of military defectors known as the People's Soldiers Production Team (PSPT) began arms manufacturing operation called Project A-1 and K-1. Other workshops aim to economically produce variants of the M16, M4A1, and the AK-47 as well as ammunition, such as 5.56×45mm NATO, 7.62x39mm, 7.62×51mm NATO, 9×19mm Parabellum, .22 caliber cartridge, RPG-7 rocket-propelled grenade, 60mm lightweight mortar rounds, 40×46mm grenades, and the M67 grenade.

Chinese-manufactured GBP-128 mine-clearing line charges were captured by PDF forces from Tatmadaw positions on 20 July 2025 and August 2026.

== See also ==
- Dry Zone theater
- Operation Taungthaman
