= Ja Htoi Pan =

Kachin youth activist and politician

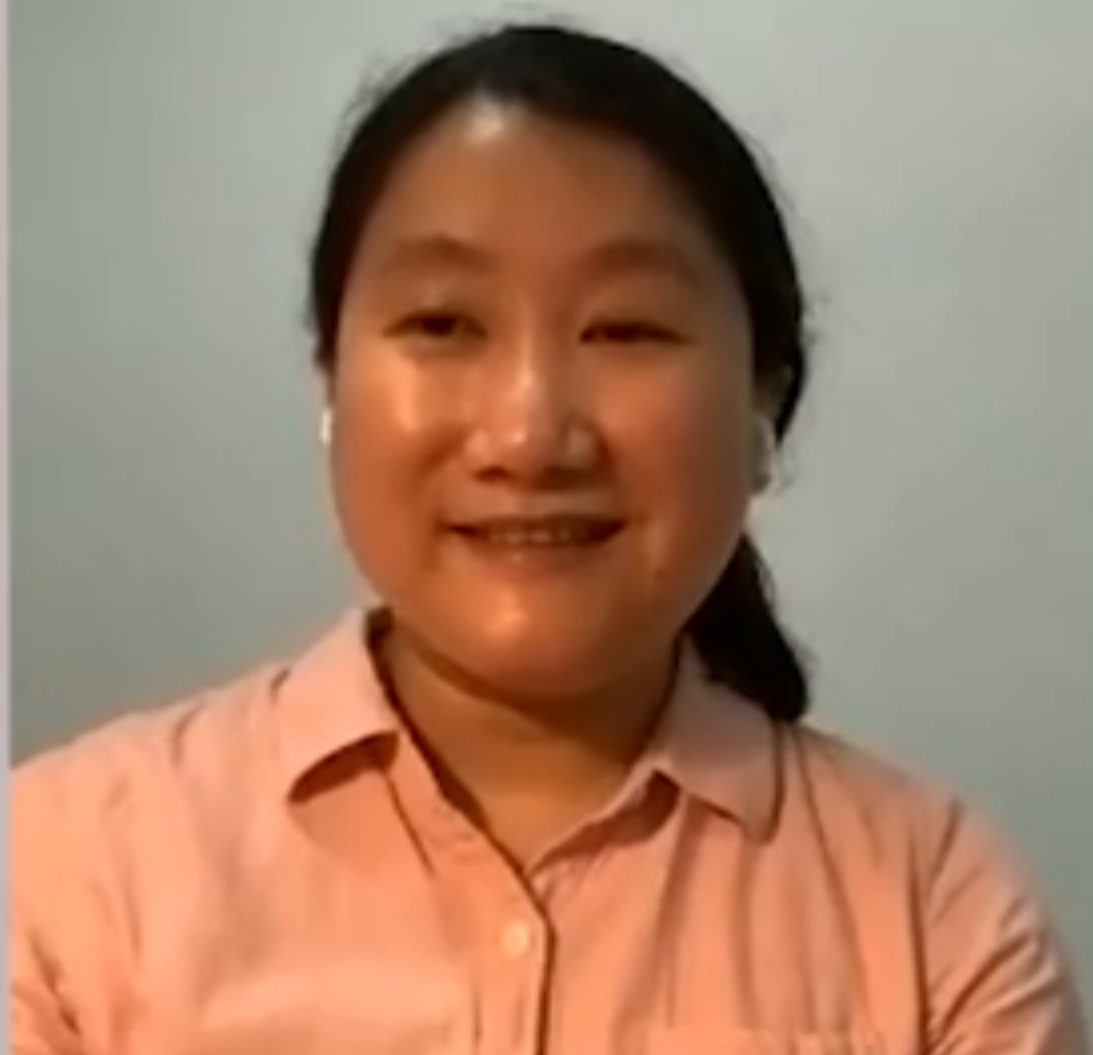
- Ja Htoi Pan in 2021

Deputy Minister of Education of NUG
- Incumbent
- Assumed office 16 April 2021; 5 years ago

Personal details
- Born: Kachin State, Myanmar
- Education: London School of Economics and Political Science; Northern Illinois University (M.A. Anthropology)
- Occupation: Youth activist, politician
- Website: www.nugmyanmar.org

Ja Htoi Pan (Burmese: ဂျာထွယ်ပန်) is a Kachin youth activist and politician who, representing Kachin Political Interim Coordination Team (KPICT), was appointed by the Committee Representing Pyidaungsu Hluttaw as the deputy minister of education in the National Unity Government on 16 April 2021.

She was born to the Reverend Dr Maran Ja Gun and Lazing Lu Aung in Kachin State.

Ja Htoi Pan studied in London School of Economics and Political Science (LSE) and completed M.A in anthropology from Northern Illinois University. She served as a tutor at Mai Ja Yang-based School of Intensive English Programs (IEP), a director at the Institute of Liberal Arts and Sciences and an associate director at Kachinland Research Center and published in international peer-reviewed journals.
