= Shwe Pon =

Burmese politician and physician

- ရွှေပုံ
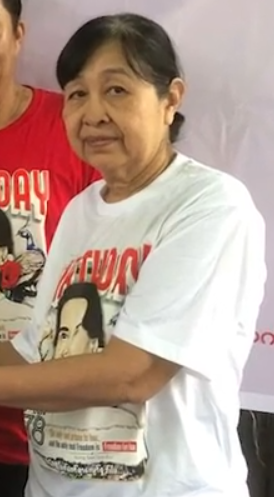
- Shwe Pon in 2023

Deputy Minister of Health of NUG
- Incumbent
- Assumed office 16 April 2021
- President: Win Myint
- Preceded by: Office established

Member-elect of the Pyithu Hluttaw
- Preceded by: Constituency established
- Succeeded by: Constituency abolished
- Constituency: Bago

Personal details
- Born: 24 February 1951 (age 75) Myanmar
- Party: National League for Democracy
- Occupation: Politician and medical doctor

Shwe Pon (Burmese: ဒေါက်တာရွှေပုံ) is a Burmese politician and medical doctor who currently serving as the Deputy Minister for the Ministry of Health appointed by the National Unity Government of Myanmar.

She was born on 24 February 1951. She is a member of the National League for Democracy. She has served as the NLD Bago Township Executive Committee since 1988, Member of Central Committee, NLD (Bago Region) 2012 till date, Member of Central Women Working Committee (NL D) and Vice president of National Health Network (NLD). In the 2015 Myanmar general election and 2020 Myanmar general election, she was elected as a Pyithu Hluttaw MP and elected representative from Bago Township parliamentary constituency.
