= Yee Mon =

Minister of defence for the national unity government of Myanmar

- ရည်မွန်
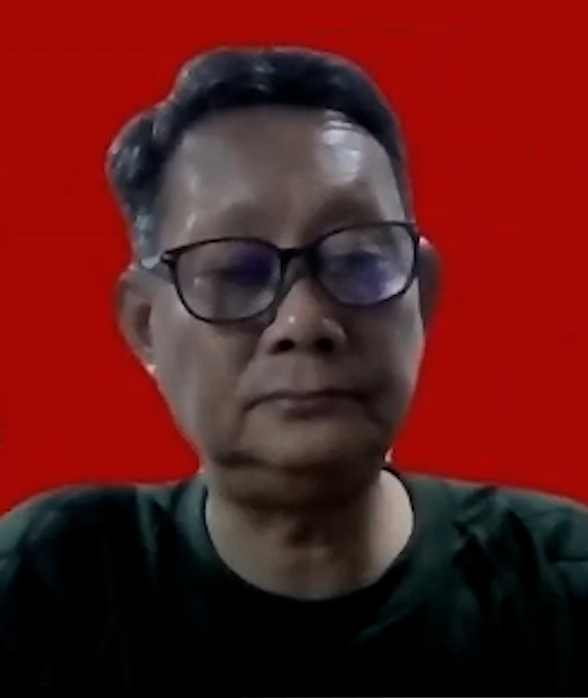
- Yee Mon during a VOA meeting in 2022

Minister of Defense of National Unity Government of Myanmar
- Incumbent
- Assumed office 16 April 2021; 5 years ago
- Appointed by: Committee Representing Pyidaungsu Hluttaw
- President: Duwa Lashi La (acting)
- Preceded by: Office established

Personal details
- Born: August 9, 1967 (age 58) Maha Aungmye Township, Mandalay Region
- Party: National League for Democracy
- Profession: Politician, poet

Yee Mon (Burmese: ရည်မွန်; also known as Maung Tin Thit or Tin Thit; born 9 August 1967) is a Burmese poet, former political prisoner, and politician currently serving as Minister of Defense of the National Unity Government of Myanmar.

He attended the University of Medicine, Mandalay in 1984. He participated in protests during the pro-democracy uprising of 1988, against the military junta that ruled Burma, and was imprisoned by the regime for seven years. Later, he worked as an environmental activist.

In the 2015 general election, Yee Mon successfully ran for Parliament with the National League for Democracy, in a district of Naypyidaw. He received 27,321 votes, narrowly defeating U Wai Lwin, a powerful former military general and former defense minister. His victory was viewed as a surprise, due to the large number of soldiers and police officers in the district, who were seen as more likely to favor an ex-general.

His discussion in the Myanmar Parliament to amend the National Constitution has been considered a notable step to peacefully remove the country's military from inappropriate political involvement and re-establish it as a proper professional army for national defense.
