= National Reconciliation and Peace Centre =

Organization in Myanmar

- Abbreviation: NRPC
- Formation: 3 November 2012; 14 years ago
- Type: NGO
- Purpose: peacekeeping
- Headquarters: Kamayut Township, Yangon, Myanmar
- Region served: Myanmar (Burma)
- Chairperson: Aung San Suu Kyi
- Key people: Kyaw Tint Swe, Tin Myo Win
- Affiliations: Peace Support Donor Group
- Staff: 120
- Website: www.nrpc.gov.mm

The National Reconciliation and Peace Centre (Burmese: အမျိုးသားပြန်လည်သင့်မြတ်ရေးနှင့်ငြိမ်းချမ်းရေးဗဟိုဌာန; abbreviated NRPC), formerly known as the Myanmar Peace Centre (abbreviated MPC), was an organization to provide technical support to the peacemaking process in Myanmar (Burma), including implementing and managing ceasefire agreements and facilitating dialogue on political issues. The centre was renamed the NRPC in July 2016, with the promulgation of Order 50/2016 by President Htin Kyaw. The centre was dissolved in February 2021 by authorities, in the aftermath of the 2021 Myanmar coup d'etat.

The centre is on U Wisara Road in Yangon and was established with the support of the Peace Donor Support Group, comprising Norway, the European Union, Japan and United Nations agencies.

== Vision and mission ==
It coordinates peace initiatives and acts as a service centre for donor governments and international non-governmental organisations that want to support the peace process. In addition, it will serve as a platform for government officials, members of ethnic militia groups, civil society organisations, international donors and international non-governmental organisations to meet and negotiate.

The centre coordinates government activities in five key areas:

1. Ceasefire negotiations and implementation
2. Peace negotiations and political dialogue
3. Coordination of assistance in conflict affected areas
4. Outreach and public diplomacy
5. Mine Actions

== Criticism ==
MPC was criticised by Bertil Lintner for lacking capacity and a mandate to promote the peace process, and was likened to an organisation which is paid to do nothing.
