= Light Infantry Division 99 (Myanmar) =

Light infantry division of the Myanmar Army

- အမှတ် ၉၉ ခြေမြန်တပ်မ
- Emblem of the Light Infantry Division 99
- Active: 1968–present
- Country: Myanmar
- Branch: Myanmar Army
- Type: Light Infantry Division
- Role: Territorial security, primary combat, auxiliary combat, mobile operations, military exercises
- Size: Division
- Nickname: Nine Nine
- Colors

Commanders
- Division Commander: Major General

Insignia
- Flag

Light Infantry Division 99 (Burmese: အမှတ် (၉၉) ခြေမြန်တပ်မ, abbreviated as Tha Ma Kha (99) (Burmese: တမခ (၉၉)) is a light infantry division of the Myanmar Army. It is headquartered in Meiktila, Mandalay Region, and its subordinate battalions are deployed across Mandalay Region and Naypyidaw Union Territory.

LID-99, along with other Light Infantry Divisions (LIDs) and Regional Military Commands (RMCs), operates under the direct command of the Bureau of Special Operations (BSO) of the Myanmar Army. These divisions are structured for rapid deployment and offensive operations without fixed territorial responsibilities, allowing them to be repositioned based on operational requirements.

== History ==
The Light Infantry Division 99 was established on May 20, 1968, in Meiktila, Mandalay Region. Its first commander was Colonel Thura Kyaw Htin (BC. No. 5332).

== Organization ==
The division is structured under the following units:

=== Strategic Units ===
- No. (991) Tactical Operations Command

- No. (992) Tactical Operations Command

- No. (993) Tactical Operations Command

=== Regiments ===
- No. (315) Light Infantry Regiment (Meiktila)

- No. (113) Light Infantry Regiment (Meiktila)

- No. (417) Light Infantry Regiment (Yintaw Village)

- No. (418) Light Infantry Regiment (Yintaw Village)

- No. (419) Light Infantry Regiment (Thazi)

- No. (420) Light Infantry Regiment (Thazi)

- No. (15) Light Infantry Regiment (Pyinmana)

- No. (14) Light Infantry Regiment (Kyaukse

- No. (109) Light Infantry Regiment (Tatkon)

- No. (79) Infantry Regiment (Meiktila)

== Commanders ==
The division has been led by several commanders since its inception:

- Colonel Kyaw Htin (BC 5332) (August 12, 1968 – July 2, 1969)

- Colonel Khin Ohn (BC 5605) (July 3, 1969 – April 28, 1972)

- Colonel Tin Sein (BC 6181) (April 29, 1972 – March 8, 1974)

- Colonel Hla Pe (BC 5796) (March 8, 1974 )

- Colonel Min Gaung (BC 6315)

- Colonel Saw Maung (BC 6187) (March 18, 1975 – August 12, 1976)

- Colonel Min Naung (BC 6129) (August 13, 1976 – November 24, 1977)

- Colonel El Khun Phan (BC 5997) (November 24, 1977 – August 7, 1981)

- Colonel Nyan Lin (BC 7863) (August 7, 1981 – November 4, 1985)

- Colonel Maung Tint (BC 7600) (November 4, 1985)

- Colonel Win Zaw Nyunt (BC 7878)

- Brigadier General Kyaw Than (BC 8458)

- Colonel San Maung

- Brigadier General Thein Aung

- Brigadier General Thet Oo (BC 12133)

- Colonel Aung Khin Soe (BC 14282)

- Brigadier General Soe Win (BC 16489)

- Brigadier General Khin Maung Htay (BC 17100)

- Colonel Ko Ko Naing

- Colonel Kyaw Tun Aung

- Colonel Aung Kyaw Lwin
