= Kyaw Ni =

Deputy minister of labour affairs of the national unity government of Myanmar

Deputy Minister of Labour Affairs of NUG
- Incumbent
- Assumed office 3 May 2021; 5 years ago

Personal details
- Born: June 14, 1978 (age 48) War Khel Ma Township, Irrawaddy Division
- Education: Law Degree (LL.B)
- Occupation: politician
- Website: www.nugmyanmar.org

Kyaw Ni (Burmese: ကျော်နီ) is a politician who currently serves as Deputy Minister of Labour Affairs of NUG.

He was appointed by the Committee Representing Pyidaungsu Hluttaw as the Deputy Minister of Labour Affairs in the National Unity Government of Myanmar on 3 May 2021.
