= Operation Taungthaman =

Offensive in the Myanmar civil war

- Part of the Myanmar civil war
Date	28 October 2023 – present (2 years, 4 months and 3 days)
Location	Madaya Township, Mandalay Region
Status	Junta forces fully recaptured Mandalay-Madaya-Singu-Thabeikkyin road on December 2025

Belligerents
Tatmadaw; Myanmar Army; Central Command; Myanmar Police Force; Pyusawhti militias	People's Defence Force; Ta'ang National Liberation Army

Commanders and leaders
Min Aung Hlaing	Unknown

Strength
Unknown	Unknown

Casualties and losses
100 casualties, two armored vehicles destroyed (rebel claim)	10 dead, 30 wounded (rebel claim) 500+ surrender (junta claim)

Operation Taungthaman (Burmese: တောင်သမန်စစ်ဆင်ရေး) is an ongoing military operation launched by the Ta'ang National Liberation Army (TNLA), directed by the People's Defence Force (PDF) focused in Madaya Township of Mandalay Region.

== Background ==
The Myanmar Civil War picked up in intensity before the start of the operation, with Operation 1027 capturing 220 Tatmadaw positions since its start. On 28 October, Operation Taungthaman was announced by the PDF, with no further information given. Troops from the Ta'ang National Liberation Army fighting in Operation 1027 were moved to execute Operation Taungthaman on 13 November.

== Timeline ==
Operation Taungthaman started in late October with attacks in Nawnghkio and Kyaukme Townships in southern Shan State, in support to the simultaneous Operation 1027.

A major offensive operation was initiated by the TNLA on 13 November, in eastern Madaya Township. Fighting erupted on that day in Kinn Village, as the junta responded with airstrikes and artillery attacks. Later junta offensives on 16–17 November led to the torching of the village, with 700 houses being burned down. 8,000 people are reported to be displaced in the township.

On 16 November, a junta-held checkpoint between Madaya and Singu Townships was attacked by the TNLA. An attempt by one of the junta's air defense units to rescue captured soldiers led to the killing of 11 civilians in a nearby teashop.

By 28 November, PDF and TNLA forces reported the capture of a junta base of around 120 soldiers in Madaya Township.

== See also ==
- Operation 1027
- Operation 1107
- Operation 1111
