= Union Peace Dialogue Joint Committee =

Negotiating committee in the Myanmar peace process

The Union Peace Dialogue Joint Committee (UPDJC) (Burmese: ပြည်ထောင်စုငြိမ်းချမ်းရေးဆွေးနွေးမှုပူးတွဲကော်မတီ) is the top negotiating committee in Myanmar's ongoing peace process. The committee consists of representatives from the government, ethnic armed groups and political parties whose have incumbent elected parliamentarians. It was formed as a part of prescribed peace process which is outlined in the Nationwide Ceasefire Agreement.
