= National Unity Government of Myanmar =

Government in exile formed in 2021

National Unity Government
- Cabinet of Myanmar in exile

- Date formed: 16 April 2021; 5 years ago

People and organisations
- President: Duwa Lashi La (acting)
- Prime Minister: Mahn Win Khaing Than
- No. of ministers: 28

History
- Incoming formation: 2021 Myanmar coup d'état leads to formation of the NUG in exile
- Outgoing election: 2020 Myanmar general election
- Predecessor: Acting Cabinet of the CRPH

The National Unity Government of the Republic of the Union of Myanmar (Burmese: အမျိုးသားညီညွတ်ရေး အစိုးရ; abbreviated NUG) is an internationally unrecognized (Note: Denial of NUG legitimacy by the United Nations (including rejection of NUG appointments to the UN), as well as lack of recognition of the NUG as the legitimate government of Myanmar by any country, the European Union, or ASEAN, mean the NUG is completely unrecognized from a diplomatic point of view, and, according to analysts, this situation has become entrenched. See § Failure to achieve diplomatic recognition for details and references.) government-in-exile of Myanmar formed by the Committee Representing Pyidaungsu Hluttaw (CRPH), a group of elected lawmakers and members of parliament ousted in the 2021 Myanmar coup d'état. It includes representatives of the National League for Democracy (the deposed ruling party of former state counsellor Aung San Suu Kyi), ethnic minority insurgent groups, and various minor parties.

The State Administration Council (SAC), the country's ruling military junta from 2021 to 2025, declared the NUG illegal and a terrorist organization, while the NUG designated the Tatmadaw and its affiliated organizations as terrorist organizations under Section 3 of Myanmar's Counter-Terrorism Law.

In May 2021, the NUG announced the formation of a "People's Defense Force", and in September the launch of a defensive war and nationwide revolution against the military junta. As of September 2021, the NUG had established representative offices in the United States, United Kingdom, Norway, France, Czech Republic, Australia, and South Korea, though these are not recognized diplomatic missions of Myanmar. On 1 February 2022, the Foreign Affairs Ministry of the NUG appointed Saw Ba Hla Thein as the first representative to Japan.

Although the NUG is widely described as a government-in-exile, it has not declared a temporary capital in another country or in Myanmar, and instead conducts its operations remotely and from hiding within Myanmar.

== History ==
Territorial control during the Myanmar civil war. Territory controlled by the NUG (PDF) shown in light green

Following the 1 February 2021 military coup, a Committee Representing Pyidaungsu Hluttaw (the Myanmar legislature) was created by members of the National League for Democracy (NLD) who had been elected as lawmakers in the 2020 general election. It claimed to be the legitimate legislative authority for Myanmar. It named a set of office-holders of the National Unity Government on 16 April, which included members of the NLD, other parties and independents.

The NUG immediately sought international recognition as the government of Myanmar and gained much support from the people of Myanmar. When the NUG was announced, its designated minister for home affairs and immigration, Lwin Ko Latt, stated that he expected recognition by several countries soon. The International Trade Union Confederation called for recognition of the NUG by governments and the United Nations, and the ASEAN Parliamentarians for Human Rights, a group of pro-human rights lawmakers within ASEAN countries, called on ASEAN to invite to the ASEAN Leaders Meeting on 24 April the NUG rather than representatives of the military junta.

In April 2021, the NUG established Public Voice Television (PVTV) as a media outlet for the NUG, the CRPH, and NUCC. PVTV hosts a series of programmes, including a satirical show called People's Voice TV, and news reports.

On 5 May 2021, the NUG announced the formation of the People's Defense Force as its armed wing to launch an armed revolution against the military junta, which designated it a terrorist organization on 8 May.

On 7 September 2021, the NUG announced the launch of a defensive war against the military junta, and urged the citizens to revolt against the junta in every corner of the country.

On 6 October 2021, Malaysia's foreign minister Saifuddin Abdullah warned the Burmese military it was prepared to hold official talks with the NUG if the military did not cooperate with the terms of ASEAN's five-point consensus. On 24 October, the Foreign Affairs Ministry appointed Bo Hla Tint, who had served as a minister in the National Coalition Government of the Union of Burma, as an ambassador to ASEAN.

On 26 April 2022, Lwin Ko Latt, the Minister of Home Affairs and Immigration, announced the formation of the Bureau of Special Intelligence. The announcement also mentioned that due to arbitrary arrests, torture, killings, and other acts by the SAC within the country through the exercise of people's power, the Bureau of Special Intelligence was set up to build national security that would ensure the social security and socio-economic development of the people while preventing violence.

On 7 September 2022, NUG acting president Duwa Lashi La stated that the regime had lost control of half of the country, noting that NUG had formed over 300 PDF battalions, and township public defence forces in 250 of the country's townships, while approximately 1,500 resistance fighters had died since the coup.

On 6 February 2023, NUG stated that it had restored internet access in at least 15 townships where the junta had cut off access since 2021. NUG spokesman Nay Phone Latt also added that they were providing access without using the junta's infrastructure. On 13 February, the NUG opened an official liaison office in Washington, DC to engage with the American government.

On 17 September 2023, the NUG's Ministry of Natural Resources and Environmental Conservation (MONREC) stated it dissolved the Myanmar Gems and Jewellery Entrepreneurs Association (MGJEA) for providing tax revenue to the SAC.

In April 2024, a significant blow to the Myanmar junta, an anti-army alliance launched drone strikes on military targets in the capital, Naypyidaw. NUG confirmed the strikes, causing casualties. The attack targeted the airport compound, about 25 km southwest of military headquarters.

In September 2024, the Indian Council of World Affairs invited representatives of the NUG, Arakan Army, Chin National Front, and Kachin Independence Army to participate in a mid-November seminar on "Constitutionalism and Federalism".

In January 2025, Lwin Ko Latt stated that the NUG will be headquartered in Sagaing Region and ministerial offices would be opened in this month in the liberated areas within the region.

Reportedly, NUG and EAOs in Kachin, Chin, and Kayah states held meetings from 23 to 25 January 2026 to discuss forming a unified coalition. On 30 March 2026, NUG and the CRPH founded the Steering Council for the Emergence of a Federal Democratic Union (SCEF) along with the Kachin Independence Organisation, Chin National Front, Karenni State Interim Executive Council, and the Karen National Union.

On the week of 19-26 July 2026, the SCEF held talks with the Spring Revolution Alliance, New Mon State Party (Anti-Military Dictatorship), Arakan Army, and Pa-O National Liberation Army to discuss cooperation, policies, and international outreach.

== International relations ==
In April 2021, Building and Wood Workers' International announced its support of NUG and called for the international community to recognise NUG's legitimacy.

In September 2021, in the lead up to the 76th United Nations General Assembly (UNGA), the UN had been expected to make a formal decision on recognizing the legitimate government of Myanmar. Ahead of the UNGA, major global labour unions issued a statement calling for a global day of action for Myanmar, specifically calling on international governments to recognise NUG and for humanitarian assistance to be provided solely through NUG channels.

On 5 October 2021, the French Senate unanimously passed a resolution to formally recognize the NUG as the official government of Myanmar, and sent it to the National Assembly for passage. On 7 October 2021, the European Parliament adopted a resolution that recognizes the CRPH and the NUG as the only legitimate representatives of Myanmar. The NUG falsely characterized these actions as tantamount to formal recognition as the legitimate government of Myanmar, which would have required additional steps.

Since ASEAN implemented the Five-Point Consensus with respect to the Myanmar situation in April 2021, the military-led State Administration Council has not honoured its commitment to the peace plan. ASEAN member states, particularly Singapore, Malaysia, and Indonesia, have publicly expressed their dissatisfaction with SAC's continued intransigence. In May 2022, Malaysia's foreign minister, Saifuddin Abdullah, publicly called on ASEAN member states to begin informally engaging NUG. The suggestion prompted a protest from SAC. On 20 September 2022, Malaysia became the first ASEAN member state to informally engage with the competing NUG, though ASEAN itself never allowed the NUG to represent Myanmar at any of its summits.

The NUG has called on the People's Defence Force to not target Chinese projects. Additionally, it reportedly sent congratulatory letters to Chinese Communist Party general secretary Xi Jinping after the 20th CCP National Congress in October 2022. In January 2024, it published a 10-point policy paper on China, describing it as "a specifically important country, not only for close, profound historical ties between the two countries but also for China's status as a global superpower". It also pledged support the one-China principle and expand economic ties.

In November 2021 and December 2023, the Inter-Parliamentary Union affirmed that the NUG's parent organisation, the Committee Representing Pyidaungsu Hluttaw, is the legitimate interlocutor for Myanmar and its members are able to participate in the official business of the IPU as observers.

On 24 July 2026, Zin Mar Aung and founder of the Burma Research Institute, Zo Tum Hmung, briefed American Representatives in the Rayburn House Office Building. They urged lawmakers to exert pressure on the Union Government of Myanmar to provide independent verification on Aung San Suu Kyi's health and to collaborate with the NUG/EAO coalition under the SCEF on the fraud factory issue.

=== Failure to achieve diplomatic recognition ===
Despite heavy early interest from Western democracies in supporting the NUG, which involved informal meetings with Western officials, formal recognition as the legitimate government of Myanmar by the United Nations nor any single country never materialized, with analysts including Catherine Renshaw of Western Sydney University concluding by 2023 that the effort had failed. The NUG inaccurately attempted to portray meetings with foreign officials and supportive statements from bodies such as the European Parliament as tantamount to recognition of the NUG as the legitimate government of Myanmar. Renshaw wrote that the NUG's legitimacy in terms of popular support was usually accepted by Western officials, but that governments were highly skeptical of its ability to achieve its goals, and some also raised concerns about the participation of NLD politicians seen (at least previously) as sympathetic to the Rohingya genocide. While the United Nations has allowed Kyaw Moe Tun, who was appointed Myanmar's permanent representative to the UN in 2020 by Win Myint, to remain in his post, and Kyaw Moe Tun has aligned himself with the NUG, UN official Richard Gowan has stated that he is not a representative of the NUG at the UN, and the UN has rejected NUG attempts to appoint a replacement. In 2021, a deal was made involving China, the United States, and Kyaw Moe Tun that Kyaw Moe Tun would remain in office and the Tatmadaw would be blocked from sending a representative to speak at the UN General Assembly, on the condition Kyaw Moe Tun would not speak either. NUG representatives have also been blocked from representing Myanmar at ASEAN events.

== Criticism ==
Pro-democracy activist, Tayzar San criticized the NUG for sluggishly implementing reforms. He lamented alleged financial mismanagement and failure to unite PDF and PDO militias into a coordinated force. The NUG has also faced allegations of corruption. In September 2025, local administrators of NUG-controlled areas in Sagaing Region were found to have misappropriated tens of millions of kyat in tax revenue. The members of the natural resources committee in Kani Township involved in the scandal were arrested with further arrests occurring in October in Kanbalu Township. The incident cause many to question why there was such corruption in revolutionary strongholds. Secretary to the Prime Minister's Office Kyi Pyay and her husband were alleged to have been abusive to employees with undue influence to hide personal enrichment from the office's income. In response the NUG suspended her and her husband during ongoing investigations of the allegations. Prominent leaders of the NUG have also been criticised by pro-junta sources for their purchase of expensive real estate in the United States and applying for asylum there, allegeding the funds were misappropriated or laundered from revolutionary funds.

The NUG has also faced complaints of local administrators violating the law and acting beyond their given authority, about which the NUG has several ongoing investigations. In 2023, a National League for Democracy party official allegedly raped a child in Mae Sot, Thailand. The NUG attempted to prosecute and bring the fugitive to justice through its Kani Township court but failed to do so, sparking a petition for swift action from the public. The Irrawaddy reported that these investigations, which include allegations of human rights abuses and military-related crimes, have weakened faith in the NUG's ability to be aware of its administrative apparatus due to its leaders' weak participation in local affairs.

According to statements from Tatmadaw prisoners of war, POWs charged with crimes by the court systems of NUG and other anti-junta forces are not provided legal counsel during trials, nor are provided sufficient opportunities to defend themselves against accusations.

The NUG has also faced criticism over its gold mining in Mingin Township and suppression of dissent. In 2024, the Mingin Township PDF were accused by local residents of allowing environmental destruction and toxic contamination of the water through issuing illegal gold mining permits. Tensions escalated on 28 August 2025, when Mingin Township Battalion 4 fired upon and arrested two members and a supplier to the Student's Revolutionary Force, reportedly to investigate desertions within the SRF. The incident led to protests in the township. The protests called for the resignation of the local township defence organisations' leadership. In response, in November 2025, the local forces reportedly cracked down by arresting administrators who participated in anti-mining demonstrations.

The NUG was also criticised from supporters of Taiwan for its official position on China, including a document issued in January 2024 affirming the One China principle.

== Funding and revenues ==
In May 2022, the NUG announced it had raised US$42 million from fundraising activities, with the majority of revenues spent on weapons and support for civil servants on strike. It has launched a number of successful initiatives, including the sale of Spring Revolution treasury bonds, an online lottery, and the sale of military-linked land and properties. Most NUG donors live abroad, and limited evidence suggests the Burmese diaspora in Singapore is the primary source of funding. The NUG has also encouraged Burmese-based companies and taxpayers to redirect taxes to the NUG, instead of the military regime. The NUG has also launched NUGPay, a parallel digital currency system.

In May 2022, the NUG raised $10 million from the sale of Min Aung Hlaing's Yangon home on Inya Lake Road. In October 2022, the NUG raised US$9.3 million during an auction of land in Mandalay's Patheingyi Township illegally seized by the military. In January 2023, the NUG raised $10 million in 18 hours, after a pre-sale of apartments on military-owned land in Yangon. In February 2023, the NUG raised $4 million after an entrepreneur bought rights to a gem mine in Mogok Township.

Since July 2024, People's Defense Force units based in Loikaw Township and Ywangan Township are raising funds via the sale of Rebels-branded (Burmese: သူပုန်, MLCTS: suupone:) green tea. The tea is sold in Burmese-diaspora owned stores and restaurants in Thailand, the United Kingdom, Australia, the UAE, South Korea, and Singapore.

== Office holders ==
=== Executives of the Government ===
Office	Name	Portfolio	Term in office			Political party	Source
Office	Name	Portfolio	Took office	Left office	Days	Political party	Source
Vice President and Acting President	Duwa Lashi La	Acting head of state and effective NUG leader	16 April 2021	Incumbent	2025	Kachin National Consultative Assembly / Kachin Political Interim Coordination Team	
Prime Minister	Mahn Win Khaing Than	Head of government	16 April 2021	Incumbent	2025	National League for Democracy	
State Counsellor (unilaterally declared by NUG)	Aung San Suu Kyi (incarcerated, UN rejects NUG's claim to represent her) (Note: While the NUG hoped that by naming Aung San Suu Kyi and Wyint Myint as its leaders, being recognized as the minister of foreign affairs and the president of Myanmar by the UN, respectively, that the NUG would gain legitimacy with the UN, Aung San Suu Kyi and Win Myint were added to the UN list prior to the formation of the NUG, have never communicated with or expressed support for the NUG, and the UN has said it does not recognize the legitimacy of the NUG, recognizing Permanent Representative Kyaw Moe Tun only because he was appointed by Win Myint in 2020, and directly denying NUG requests to appoint a replacement to represent Myanmar at the UN on the basis that the NUG is not recognized.)	Symbolic overall leader	16 April 2021	Incumbent	2025	National League for Democracy	
President (unilaterally declared by NUG)	Win Myint (inactive, UN rejects NUG's claim to represent him)	Symbolic head of state	16 April 2021	Incumbent	2025	National League for Democracy	

=== Ministers of the Government ===
Office	Name	Term in office			Political party	Source
Office	Name	Took office	Left office	Days	Political party	Source
Minister of Commerce	Khin Ma Ma Myo	25 August 2021	Incumbent	1894	Independent	
Minister of Communications, Information & Technology	Htin Linn Aung	5 June 2021	Incumbent	1975	Independent	
Minister of Defence	Yee Mon	16 April 2021	Incumbent	2025	National League for Democracy	
Deputy Minister of Defence	Nai Kao Rot (Colonel Naing Kaung Yuat)	16 April 2021	Incumbent	2025	New Mon State Party	
Minister of Education	Dr. Zaw Wai Soe	16 April 2021	Incumbent	2025	Independent	
Minister of Health	Dr. Zaw Wai Soe	16 April 2021	Incumbent	2025	Independent	
Deputy Minister of Education	Ja Htoi Pan	16 April 2021	Incumbent	2025	Kachin Political Interim Coordination Team	
Deputy Minister of Education	Dr. Sai Khaing Myo Tun	3 May 2021	Incumbent	2008	Independent	
Deputy Minister of Health	Dr. Shwe Pon	16 April 2021	Incumbent	2025	National League for Democracy	
Minister of Electricity and Energy	Soe Thura Tun	5 June 2021	Incumbent	1975	National League for Democracy	
Deputy Minister of Electricity and Energy	Maw Htun Aung	26 July 2021	Incumbent	1924	Shan Nationalities League for Democracy	
Minister of Federal Union Affairs	Dr. Lian Hmung Sakhong	16 April 2021	Incumbent	2025	Chin National Front / Interim Chin National Consultative Council	
Deputy Minister of Federal Union Affairs	Chit Tun	16 April 2021	Incumbent	2025	Karenni National People's Liberation Front	
Deputy Minister of Federal Union Affairs	Maing Win Htoo	16 April 2021	Incumbent	2025	Ta'ang National Party	
Minister of Foreign Affairs	Zin Mar Aung	16 April 2021	Incumbent	2025	National League for Democracy	
Deputy Minister of Foreign Affairs	Moe Zaw Oo	16 April 2021	Incumbent	2025	National League for Democracy	
Minister of Home Affairs and Immigration	Lwin Ko Latt	16 April 2021	Incumbent	2025	National League for Democracy	
Deputy Minister of Home Affairs and Immigration	Khu Hte Bu	16 April 2021	Incumbent	2025	Karenni National Progressive Party	
Deputy Minister of Home Affairs and Immigration	Htay Ngwe	30 March 2026	Incumbent	216		
Minister of Humanitarian Affairs and Disaster Management	Win Myat Aye	16 April 2021	Incumbent	2025	National League for Democracy	
Deputy Minister of Humanitarian Affairs and Disaster Management	Naw Htoo Phaw	16 April 2021	Incumbent	2025	Independent	
Minister of Human Rights	Aung Myo Min	3 May 2021	Incumbent	2008	Independent	
Deputy Minister of Human Rights	Ba Ham Htan	3 May 2021	Incumbent	2008	Kayan New Land Party	
Deputy Minister of Human Rights	Aung Kyaw Moe	1 July 2023	Incumbent	3 years, 123 days	Independent	
Minister of International Cooperation	Dr. Sasa	16 April 2021	Incumbent	2025	National League for Democracy	
Deputy Minister of International Cooperation	Hkaung Naw	3 May 2021	6 November 2022		Independent	
Deputy Minister of International Cooperation	David Gum Awng	6 November 2022	Incumbent	4 years, 0 days	Independent	
Minister of Labour	Nai Suwanna	3 May 2021	Incumbent	2008	Former member of Mon Unity Party	
Deputy Minister of Labour	Kyaw Ni	3 May 2021	Incumbent	2008	All Burma Federation of Trade Unions	
Minister of Natural Resources and Environmental Conservation	Dr. Hkalen Tu Hkawng	16 April 2021	Incumbent	2025	Independent	
Deputy Minister of Natural Resources and Environmental Conservation	Khun Bedu	16 April 2021	28 July 2023	832	Kayan National Party	
Deputy Minister of Natural Resources and Environmental Conservation	Khun Saw Hpu	28 July 2023	Incumbent	1193		
Minister of Justice	Thein Oo	5 June 2021	Incumbent	1975	Independent	
Minister of Planning, Finance and Investment	Tin Tun Naing	16 April 2021	Incumbent	2025	National League for Democracy	
Deputy Minister of Planning, Finance and Investment	Min Zayar Oo	16 April 2021	Incumbent	2025	Former member of Mon Unity Party	
Minister of Women, Youths and Children Affairs	Naw Susanna Hla Hla Soe	16 April 2021	Incumbent	2025	National League for Democracy	
Deputy Minister of Women, Youths and Children Affairs	Ei Thinzar Maung	16 April 2021	Incumbent	2025	Former member of Democratic Party for a New Society	
Auditor General of the Union	Toe Aung	26 July 2021	Incumbent	1924	Independent	

== See also ==
- People's Defence Force
- National Coalition Government of the Union of Burma (1990–2012)
