= Duwa Lashi La =

Vice President of the National Unity Government of Myanmar since 2021

- ဒူဝါလရှီးလ
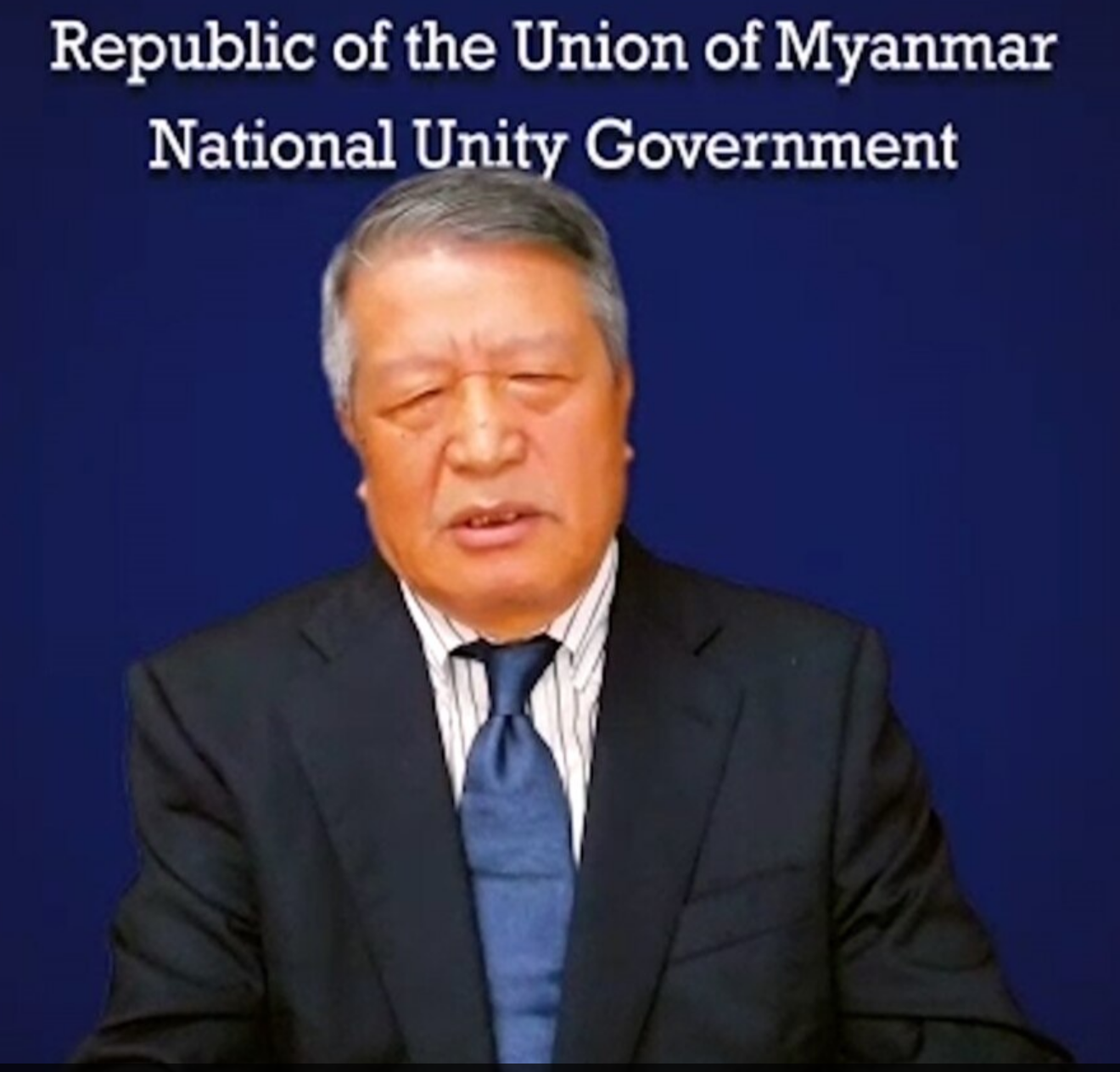
- Duwa Lashi La in 2023

Vice President acting as President of the National Unity Government of Myanmar
- Incumbent
- Assumed office 16 April 2021
- Prime Minister: Mahn Win Khaing Than
- Preceded by: Mahn Win Khaing Than (Acting Cabinet of CRPH)

Personal details
- Born: 9 September 1950 (age 76) Mung Ji Village, Shan State, Burma
- Education: University of Yangon (BA, LLB)
- Website: web.archive.org/web/20240515190233/https://gov.nugmyanmar.org/acting-president-duwa-lashi-la/

Duwa Lashi La (Burmese: ဒူဝါလရှီးလ; pronounced [dùwà làʃì là]; born 9 September 1950) is a Kachin politician and lawyer in Myanmar who is the president of the Kachin National Consultative Council.

Duwa Lashi La was named by the Committee Representing Pyidaungsu Hluttaw, on 16 April 2021, as the vice-president in the National Unity Government of Myanmar, a parallel government to the State Administrative Council formed after the 2021 coup.

On 7 September 2021, Duwa Lashi La announced that the defensive war against the military junta had been launched and urged the citizens to revolt against the junta in every corner of the country.

== Early life and education ==
Duwa Lashi La was born in the village of Mung Ji in northern Shan State. He graduated from Lashio High School with a B grade and worked as a teacher at his hometown, Mongji School. After working as a teacher, he re-entered the tenth grade at St. Michael's School in Maymyo. In 1970, he studied law at Yangon University.

Duwa Lashi La received his BA in 1974. In 1976, he regained his L.L.B. After graduation, he worked as a prosecutor in Myitkyina and Lashio for two years. He then worked as a law officer for 16 years from 1978 to 1994.

== 2021 coup and Acting President of the NUG ==
Duwa Lashi La was appointed vice president and acting president after a meeting between the Committee Representing Pyidaungsu Hluttaw (CRPH) and the Kachin Political Interim Coordination Team (KPICT). According to The Irrawaddy, during the meeting, Duwa Lashi La argued that the detained vice president Henry Van Thio should be replaced because “We are making the revolution to bring down tyranny and build a new era, it is good not to include people who were involved in the military, and instead better to choose those with a vision of reform towards democracy and federalism.” The CRPH agreed and asked Duwa Lashi La to take the position, a position that Duwa Lashi La accepted.
