= Acting Cabinet of the Committee Representing Pyidaungsu Hluttaw =

Government in exile formed in 2021

- Cabinet of Myanmar in exile
- Date formed: 2 March 2021
- Date dissolved: 16 April 2021

People and organisations
- President: Mahn Win Khaing Than (acting)

History
- Incoming formation: 2021 Myanmar coup d'état
- Outgoing election: 2020 Myanmar general election
- Successor: National Unity Government

The Acting Cabinet of the Committee Representing Pyidaungsu Hluttaw was a Myanmar provisional government in exile formed by the Committee Representing Pyidaungsu Hluttaw (CRPH), a group of elected lawmakers and members of parliament ousted in the 2021 Myanmar coup d'état. The cabinet was formed on 2 March 2021 and replaced by longer term National Unity Government on 16 April 2021.

== History ==
On 2 March 2021, the committee installed four government ministers to supervise nine ministries. Three of them are elected members from the NLD and one is the rector of the University of Medicine 1. According to the statement of the CRPH, its prime purpose is to fulfill the duties of the civilian government. The committee officially stated it would assign other suitable persons to assume the duties on behalf of cabinet members On 9 March, it named Mahn Win Khaing Than, the third Speaker of the Assembly of the Union of Myanmar between 2016 and 2018, as the acting Vice-President of Myanmar and declared that he would perform the duties of the President in his absence. The acting cabinet was abolished and formed the National Unity Government on 16 April 2021.

== Structure ==
=== Heads of the cabinet ===
Win Myint	President	Released on 17 April 2026
Aung San Suu Kyi	State Counsellor	Detained
Mahn Win Khaing Than	Vice President	Former Speaker of the Assembly of the Union of Myanmar (2016-2018)

=== Cabinet members ===
Office	Name	Term in office			Political Party
Office	Name	Took office	Left office	Days	Political Party
Minister of Foreign Affairs	Zin Mar Aung	2 March 2021	16 April 2021	45	NLD
Ministry of President's Office	Lwin Ko Latt	2 March 2021	16 April 2021	45	NLD
Ministry of Union Government Office	Lwin Ko Latt	2 March 2021	16 April 2021	45	NLD
Ministry of Planning, Finance and Industry	Tin Tun Naing	2 March 2021	16 April 2021	45	NLD
Ministry of Investment and Foreign Economic Relations	Tin Tun Naing	2 March 2021	16 April 2021	45	NLD
Ministry of Commerce	Tin Tun Naing	2 March 2021	16 April 2021	45	NLD
Ministry of Labour, Immigration and Population	Zaw Wai Soe, Dr.	2 March 2021	16 April 2021	45	Independent
Ministry of Education	Zaw Wai Soe, Dr.	2 March 2021	16 April 2021	45	Independent
Ministry of Health and Sports	Zaw Wai Soe, Dr.	2 March 2021	16 April 2021	45	Independent
Ministry of Social Welfare, Relief and Resettlement	Win Myat Aye, Dr.	23 March 2021	16 April 2021	24	NLD
