= Committee Representing Pyidaungsu Hluttaw =

Burmese legislature in exile

- ပြည်ထောင်စုလွှတ်တော် ကိုယ်စားပြုကော်မတီ
- Predecessor: Second Pyidaungsu Hluttaw
- Established: 5 February 2021; 5 years ago
- Type: Legislature in exile
- Headquarters: Unknown
- Location: Myanmar
- Chairman: Aung Kyi Nyunt
- Affiliations: Acting Cabinet of the Committee Representing Pyidaungsu Hluttaw and later the Myanmar National Unity Government
- Website: crphmyanmar.org

The Committee Representing Pyidaungsu Hluttaw (Burmese: ပြည်ထောင်စုလွှတ်တော် ကိုယ်စားပြုကော်မတီ; abbreviated CRPH) is a Burmese legislative body in exile, representing a group of National League for Democracy lawmakers and members of parliament ousted in the 2021 Myanmar coup d'état. The Committee consists of 17 members of the Pyithu Hluttaw and Amyotha Hluttaw, the two houses of Myanmar parliament.

The Committee claims to carry out the duties of Myanmar's dissolved legislature, the Pyidaungsu Hluttaw, and has formed a government in exile, the National Unity Government, in cooperation with several ethnic minority insurgent groups.

== History ==
Representatives elected in the November 2020 elections have not officially recognized the legitimacy of the coup d'état. On 4 February 2021, around 70 MP-elects from the NLD took an oath of office in Naypyidaw, pledging to abide by the people's mandate, and to serve as lawmakers for their original five-year term. The following day, 15 NLD politicians led by Phyu Phyu Thin, a Pyithu Hluttaw member representing Yangon's Mingala Taungnyunt Township, formed the committee to conduct parliamentary affairs. The committee held its first session on Zoom.

On 7 February, CRPH condemned the military's efforts to overthrow a civilian-elected government as a "criminal act" in violation of Chapter 6 of the Myanmar Penal Code, and dismissed the legitimacy of Myint Swe's Cabinet. CRPH has also advised UN diplomats and the international community to work directly with the committee in relation to official government business.

On 9 February, CRPH enacted the State Counsellor Law, extending the term of the State Counsellor of Myanmar for another five years, through 1 April 2026. The same day, it issued a statement condemning the military's violent crackdown of the ongoing 2021 Myanmar protests, calling for the preservation of freedom of speech and its support of the civil disobedience movement.

On 10 February, the committee announced the addition of two elected MPs from ethnic political parties, namely the Ta'ang National Party and the Kayah State Democratic Party.

On 15 February, the junta charged the 17 members of the CRPH with incitement under section 505b of the Penal Code, which carries a maximum sentence of two years in prison.

On 22 February, the committee appointed Sasa as its special envoy to the United Nations and Htin Linn Aung as special representative of its international relations office which opened in Maryland, United States of America.

On 1 March, CRPH declared the State Administration Council (SAC) a terrorist group for its "atrocities and the act of terrorism" on the unarmed civilians.

On 2 March, the committee appointed Zin Mar Aung, Lwin Ko Latt, Tin Tun Naing and Zaw Wai Soe as acting union ministers in its cabinet. On 9 March the committee appointed Mahn Win Khaing Than as Acting Vice-President of Myanmar

The CRPH withdrew its designation of all ethnic armed organisations (EAOs) as terrorist groups. The CRPH declared the abolishment of the 2008 Constitution and published a 20-page Charter for Federal Democracy on 2 April 2021.

On 16 April 2021, the CRPH announced the formation of the National Unity Government, which includes ousted lawmakers, members of ethnic groups, and key figures in the anti-coup protest.

In November 2021 and December 2023, the Inter-Parliamentary Union affirmed that the Committee Representing Pyidaungsu Hluttaw is the legitimate interlocutor for Myanmar and its members are able to participate in the official business of the IPU as observers.

== Structure ==
=== Chair ===
The chair, chosen by CRPH members following the CRPH Handbook, has a key role. They oversee CRPH meetings, similar to a Speaker, and keep an eye on CRPH's activities with the help of the Secretary Board.

Additionally, the chair also acts as the Speaker of the Pyidaungsu Hluttaw, which is Myanmar's national legislative body. In this dual role, they lead elected representatives and play a crucial part in addressing the current crisis in Myanmar, both at home and abroad.

=== Secretary Board ===
Name	Position	Political Party	Remarks
Aung Kyi Nyunt	Chair	National League for Democracy (NLD)	
Tun Myint	Secretary	National League for Democracy (NLD)	
Phyu Phyu Thin	Secretary	National League for Democracy (NLD)	
Mai Lamin Tun	Secretary	Ta'ang National Party (TNP)	
Yee Mon @ Tin Thit	Member	National League for Democracy (NLD)	
Zin Mar Aung	Member	National League for Democracy (NLD)	
Lwin Ko Latt	Member	National League for Democracy (NLD)	
Lama Naw Aung	Member	Kachin State People's Party (KSPP)	
Zay Latt	Member	National League for Democracy (NLD)	
Myo Naing	Member	National League for Democracy (NLD)	
Myat Thida Htun	Member	National League for Democracy (NLD)	
Nay Myo	Member	National League for Democracy (NLD)	
Wai Phyo Aung	Member	National League for Democracy (NLD)	
Win Naing	Member	National League for Democracy (NLD)	
Saw Shar Phaung Awar	Member	National League for Democracy (NLD)	
Zaw Min Thein	Member	National League for Democracy (NLD)	
Okkar Min	Member	National League for Democracy (NLD)	
Naing Htoo Aung	Member	National League for Democracy (NLD)	
Robert Gnereh	Member	Kayah State Democratic Party (KSDP)	
Sithu Maung	Member	National League for Democracy (NLD)	

=== Members ===
Name	Constituency	Political party	Remarks
Phyu Phyu Thin	Mingala Taungnyunt Township	National League for Democracy (NLD)	Member of Pyithu Hluttaw
Tin Thit	Pobbathiri Township	National League for Democracy (NLD)	Member of Pyithu Hluttaw
Tun Myint	Bahan Township	National League for Democracy (NLD)	Member of Pyithu Hluttaw
Naing Htoo Aung	Natogyi Township	National League for Democracy (NLD)	Member of Pyithu Hluttaw
Wai Phyo Aung	Thaketa Township	National League for Democracy (NLD)	Member of Pyithu Hluttaw
Zin Mar Aung	Yankin Township	National League for Democracy (NLD)	Member of Pyithu Hluttaw
Lwin Ko Latt	Thanlyin Township	National League for Democracy (NLD)	Member of Pyithu Hluttaw
Okkar Min	Myeik Township	National League for Democracy (NLD)	Member of Pyithu Hluttaw
Win Naing	Mogaung Township	National League for Democracy (NLD)	Member of Pyithu Hluttaw
Nay Myo	Nyaungshwe Township	National League for Democracy (NLD)	Member of Pyithu Hluttaw
Zaw Min Thein	Laymyethna Township	National League for Democracy (NLD)	Member of Pyithu Hluttaw
Myo Naing	Chanayethazan Township	National League for Democracy (NLD)	Member of Pyithu Hluttaw
Sithu Maung	Pabedan Township	National League for Democracy (NLD)	Member of Pyithu Hluttaw
Lamin Htun	Namhsan Township	Ta'ang National Party (TNP)	Member of Pyithu Hluttaw
Lama Naw Aung	N Jang Yan Township	Kachin State People's Party (KSPP)	
Zay Latt	Bago Region No.7	National League for Democracy (NLD)	Member of Amyotha Hluttaw
Myat Thida Htun	Mon State No. 8	National League for Democracy (NLD)	Member of Amyotha Hluttaw
Saw Shar Phaung Awar	Kayin State No. 4	National League for Democracy (NLD)	Member of Amyotha Hluttaw
Aung Kyi Nyunt	Magway Region No.6	National League for Democracy (NLD)	Member of Amyotha Hluttaw
Robert Gnereh	Kayah State No. 10	Kayah State Democratic Party (KySDP)	Member of Amyotha Hluttaw
