= Sadaung, Natogyi Township =

Sadaung ဆားတောင်
- Town
- Location in Burma.
- Coordinates: 21°17′42″N 95°47′10″E
- Country: Burma
- Region: Mandalay Region
- District: Myingyan
- Township: Natogyi
- Elevation: 166 m (545 ft)
- Time zone: UTC+6.30 (MST)

Sadaung is a small town in eastern Myingyan District in the center of the Mandalay Region in Burma (Mandalay). It is located just south of Route 2, south-west of Pyinzi and eastsouth-east of Natogyi.
