= Taungtha, Mandalay =

Thaungtha Taungtha
- Town
- Location in Burma
- Coordinates: 21°16′44″N 95°26′48″E
- Country: Myanmar
- Division: Mandalay Region
- District: Myingyan District
- Township: Thaungtha Township

Population (2005)
  - Religions: Buddhism
- Time zone: UTC+6.30 (MST)

Taungtha or Thaungtha is a town in the Mandalay Division of central Myanmar. It located south-west of the volcanic cone Mount Taungtha (1788 ft) and above the right (east) bank of the Sindewa (Sintewa) River. There are six quarters in Taungtha township. Taungtha is the administrative seat for Taungtha Township, and is on both the Taunggyi–Myingyan railway and the Meiktila–Myingyan highway. It is also on the Western Trunk Road from Kyaukpadaung to Natogyi.

Multiple clashes took place in the town in August 2024 between the People's Defense Force and Myanmar's military.

== Economics ==
Taungtha is in the cotton growing area of Burma and the China World Best Group completed a garment factory there in 2006. The main occupation of Taungtha is growing onion in the bank of Sintelwa. Besides, there also have been cultivation of varieties of bean, corn, etc. (ref: Record of Taungtha Township.)
