= Simeekhon =

Town in Mandalay Region, Myanmar

Simeekhon ဆီမီးခုံမြို့
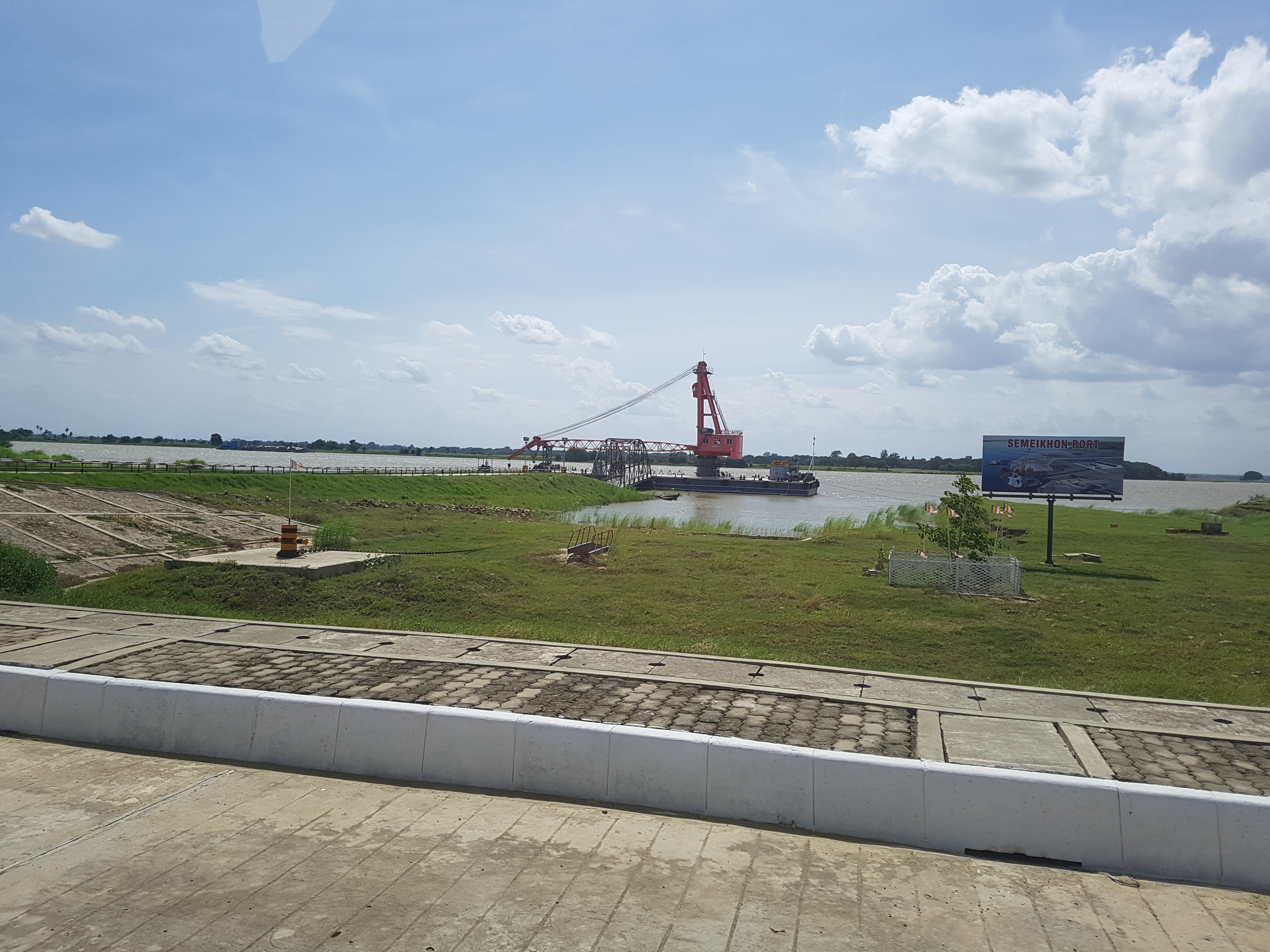
- Simeekhon Port on the Irrawaddy River
- Interactive map of Simeekhon
- Coordinates: 21.7344°N 95.4225°E
- Country: Myanmar
- Region: Mandalay Region
- District: Myingyan District
- Township: Myingyan Township

Population (2023)
  - Total: 5,070
- Time zone: UTC+6.30 (MMT)

Simeekhon (Burmese: ဆီမီးခုံမြို့, also spelt Simeikhon) is a town in western Myingyan Township in western Mandalay Region located on the Irrawaddy River in central Myanmar. The town has a Myanmar Army outpost. Through the current phase of the Myanmar civil war, the road between Myingyan and Simeekhon was contested with military clashes.

== Notable people ==
- Tin Tun Naing - Union Minister of Planning and Finance (2021-present)
