= Naing Htoo Aung =

- နိုင်ထူးအောင်
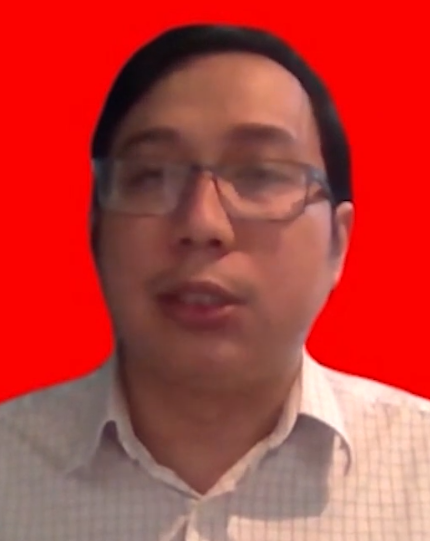
- Naing Htoo Aung in 2022

Member of the Pyithu Hluttaw
- Constituency: Natogyi Township

Secretary of the Ministry of Defense of NUG

Personal details
- Born: 21 September 1985 (age 40) Mandalay, Myanmar
- Party: National League for Democracy
- Occupation: Politician

Naing Htoo Aung (Burmese: နိုင်ထူးအောင်) is a Burmese politician who currently serves as the secretary of the Ministry of Defense of NUG. He is also the member of Committee Representing Pyidaungsu Hluttaw - CRPH.

He was elected as a Pyithu Hluttaw MP for Natogyi Township in both 2015 Myanmar general election and 2020 Myanmar general election.

== Early life and education ==
Naing Htoo Aung was born in 1988 in the Mandalay Region of Myanmar. He graduated M.P.A, B.Sc (Physics) and Dip in International Law.

== Political career ==
In the 2015 Myanmar general election, he contested the Pyithu Hluttaw from Natogi Township parliamentary constituency. He served as a Pyithu Hluttaw member from Natogyi Township until 2020 Myanmar general election in which he was re-elected from the same township. After the 2021 Myanmar coup d'état, he joined CRPH as a member and currently serve as a secretary for Ministry of Defence - NUG.

He also serves as a member of the NLD Central Committee (Reserve) and as the Treasurer of NLD Mandalay Region Executive Committee.

=== Duties of Hluttaw Representative ===
After being elected in 2015 Myanmar general election, he served as a member of the International Relations Committee of the Pyithu Hluttaw, as a member of committee on the Rights of Women and Children, and as a member of the Parliamentary Capacity Building Advisory Council.

He also became a member of the Joint Committee on ASEAN Parliaments of the Pyidaungsu Hluttaw in 2015.
