= Phyo =

Phyo is a Burmese name that may refer to the following notable people:

- Pyae Phyo Paing (born 1992), Burmese singer, songwriter, and actor
- Paing Phyo Thu (born 1990), Burmese film actress and a medical doctor
- Phyo Zeya Thaw (1981–2022), Burmese politician and hip-hop artist
- Wai Phyo Aung (born 1985), Burmese politician and medical doctor
- Heavy Phyo, Burmese child actor and singer
- Hein Phyo Win (born 1998), Burmese footballer
- Si Phyo (born 1990), Burmese actor
- Htet Phyo Wai (born 2000), Burmese footballer
- Phyo Ngwe Soe (born 1983), Burmese actor
- Aung Wai Phyo (born 1993), Burmese footballer
- Wai Phyo Aung (born 1985), Burmese politician and medical doctor
- Phyo Phyo Ei (born 1991), Burmese television and film actress
- Kyaw Zin Phyo (born 1993), Burmese footballer
- Pyae Phyo Zaw (born 1994), Burmese footballer
- Ani Phyo (born 1968), Canadian-born American chef, author, and whole food and sustainable agricultural advocate
