= Shwe Aing =

First Prince of Pyinsi (c. 18th century) during the Konbaung Dynasty of Myanmar

- First Prince of Pyinsi
- Born: c. 1720s–1730s
- Died: c. late 18th century
- Spouse: Princess Khin Ama of Pyithawtha
- House: Konbaung
- Father: Maung Pyay (Minye Thinkathu, Prince of Kyauk Sauk)
- Mother: Princess Khin Wa
- Religion: Theravada Buddhism

Shwe Aing (Burmese: ရွှေအိုင်) was a royal prince during the Konbaung dynasty of Burma. He received the appanage of Pyinsi.

== Life ==
Shwe Aing was born in Burma to Maung Pyay, who held the title Minye Thinkathu and served as the Prince of Kyauk Sauk, and Princess Khin Wa, daughter of Min Thiri Yanta Za, Commander of Shwe Ka in Sippaw, and Princess Ma Bek. His grandfather, Prince Maung Shwe Ya, was the full brother of King Alaungpaya and died before ascending the throne, making Shwe Aing a direct descendant of Alaungpaya's siblings. King Alaungpaya granted him the appanageof Pyinsi and conferred upon him the title of Prince of Pyinsi. He was one of the five Princes of Pyinsi during the Konbaung dynasty.

Shwe Aing married Princess Khin Ama of Pyithawtha, daughter of Minhla Kyawthu, a commander of Inwa.

== See also ==
- Konbaung Dynasty
- Burma
