= Pyinzi =

Pyin Si ပြင်စည် Pyinsi, Pyinse
- Town
- Location in Burma.
- Coordinates: 21°22′57″N 95°52′19″E
- Country: Burma
- Region: Mandalay Region
- District: Myingyan
- Township: Natogyi
- Elevation: 131 m (430 ft)
- Time zone: UTC+6.30 (MST)

Pyin Si is a town in eastern Myingyan District in the center of the Mandalay Region in Myanmar. It is located at the crossroads where Route 2 goes west to Natogyi, Route 2 goes east to Myittha, and a secondary highway goes south to Kokkosu and Pindale.
