= Tin Tun Naing =

Burmese acting union minister (born 1971)

- တင်ထွန်းနိုင်

Acting Union Minister of Planning, Finance and Industry of Myanmar
- Incumbent
- Assumed office 2 March 2021
- Appointed by: CRPH
- President: Win Myint

Acting Union Minister of Investment and Foreign Economic Relations of Myanmar
- Incumbent
- Assumed office 2 March 2021
- Appointed by: CRPH
- President: Win Myint

Member of the Pyithu Hluttaw
- In office 1 February 2016 – 1 February 2021
- Constituency: Seikkyi Kanaungto Township
- Majority: 8,392

Personal details
- Born: 30 January 1971 (age 55) Simeekhon, Myingyan District, Myanmar
- Party: National League for Democracy
- Education: Mandalay Institute of Technology; Yangon Institute of Economics
- Occupation: Activist; Politician

Tin Tun Naing (Burmese: တင်ထွန်းနိုင်) is a Burmese activist and politician who currently serves as the acting union minister for the Ministry of Planning, Finance and Industry, Ministry of Investment and Foreign Economic Relations and Ministry of Commerce. He is also a member of House of Representatives for Seikkyi Kanaungto Township and of the Committee Representing Pyidaungsu Hluttaw.

== Early life and education ==
Tin Tun Naing was born on 30 January 1971 in Simeekhon, Myingyan District, Mandalay Region. He conferred his bachelor's degree in electronic engineering from Mandalay Institute of Technology (MIT) and completed Executive MBA program from Yangon Institute of Economics.

== Political career ==
In the 2015 Myanmar general election, Tin Tun Naing contested in Seikkyi Kanaungto Township constituency for Pyithu Hluttaw, from the National League for Democracy, and won a seat by 8,392 votes.

In the 2020 Myanmar general election, he was re-elected as an MP for Seikkyi Kanaungto Township but was not allowed to assume his seat due to the military coup.

On 5 February 2021, in the aftermath of the 2021 Myanmar coup d'état, he became a member of the Committee Representing Pyidaungsu Hluttaw.

On 2 March 2021, he was appointed by CRPH as the acting union minister for the Ministry of Planning, Finance and Industry, the Ministry of Investment and Foreign Economic Relations and the Ministry of Commerce.
