= National Highway 2 (Myanmar) =

Road in Myanmar

National Highway 2
- အမှတ် 2 ပြည်ထောင်စုလမ်းမကြီး

Route information
- Length: 77.65 km (48.25 mi)

Major junctions
- East end: Htone Khar
- West end: Maw Daung

Location
- Country: Myanmar
- Major cities: Thea Hpyu

Highway system
- Transport in Myanmar

National Highway 2 (NH2) is an east–west flowing highway of central-western Burma.

== Route Description ==
National Highway 2 runs from National Highway 1 in Htone Khar to the Thai border at Maw Daung. The road passes through tropical rainforests and forms a lower link through the border mountains. Not far from the border crossing is the important Phet Kasem Road.

== History ==
The original National Highway 2 was a much longer route from Yangon to Myittha, largely along the Irrawaddy River. The highway began at Satthwadaw, to the north of Yangon at 17°2′30″N 96°7′56″E where it is fed by the National Highway 1 and then branches off to the northwest. At Myingyan it joins the National Highway 18. At this point the road forks to the east and eventually rejoins National Highway 1 near the village of Gyobinchan in Myittha Township at 21°22′59″N 96°10′32″E. The highway mostly follows the course of the Ayeyarwady River on its eastern bank. The original route was largely absorbed into National Highway 11 (Myanmar)

The NH 2 crosses the 245-meter-high Singkhon Pass, a strategic point where Thailand is at its narrowest. This was historically a point of conflict between Siam and Burma and also played a role during World War II. For a long time, there was no official border crossing, but one opened in 2015. During this period, the entire NH 2 was paved; before that, it was largely a dirt road, except near the border town of Maw Daung. In 2020, the road through Maw Daung was widened to two lanes by two, presumably to impress visitors.
