= Tha Hla Shwe =

Burmese physician

- သာလှရွှေ

President of the Myanmar Red Cross Society
- In office 2006–2016
- Succeeded by: Mya Thu

Rector of the University of Medicine 2, Yangon
- In office 1992–2004
- Preceded by: Ko Lay
- Succeeded by: Than Nu Shwe

Personal details
- Born: 11 October 1940 (age 85) Rangoon, British Burma (now Yangon, Myanmar)
- Spouse: Khin Lay Myint
- Children: 2
- Education: Institute of Medicine 1, Yangon (M.B., B.S); London School of Hygiene & Tropical Medicine; University of Southern California
- Occupation: Physician, Public Health Specialist, Professor, Rector

Tha Hla Shwe (Burmese: သာလှရွှေ; born 11 October 1940) is a Burmese physician who served as president of the Myanmar Red Cross Society from 2006 to 2016. He has also served as Rector of the University of Medicine 2, Yangon from 1992 to 2004.

== Early life and education ==
Tha was born on 26 July 1940 in Rangoon, British Burma. He graduated high school from St. Paul's High School in Yangon in 1957. He enrolled at the Institute of Medicine 1, Yangon and graduated with MBBS degree in 1964. Following his medical degree, he went on to specialize in Preventive Medicine and Tropical Medicine, pursued further studies and received postgraduate diplomas from Institute of Medicine 1, Yangon in 1968, and London School of Hygiene & Tropical Medicine in 1969. He later received Master of Science in education from University of Southern California in 1984 and an honorary Doctorate degree from Institute of Medicine 1, Yangon in 1999.

== Career ==
Tha Hla Shwe was appointed as a medical tutor in 1966 and promoted to the Professor and Head of Department of Preventive and Social Medicine in 1988. He then served as the Deputy Director General of Health Manpower Department of Ministry of Health (Myanmar) for three years and the Rector of the Institute of Medicine 2, Yangon from 1992 to 2004. He is also an active member of the Myanmar Medical Association and served as the Chairperson of the Preventive & Social Medicine Society from 1994 to 1998, and also a member of the Myanmar Academy of Medical Science.

He served as the chairperson of the 2014 Enquiry Commission on the Duchia-Tan Village incident in Maungdaw District, a member of the 2015 Commission for reviewing temporary identity certification in Rakhine State, and a member of Advisory Commission on Rakhine State in 2016.
