= Myingyan Prison =

Prison in Myingyan, Myanmar

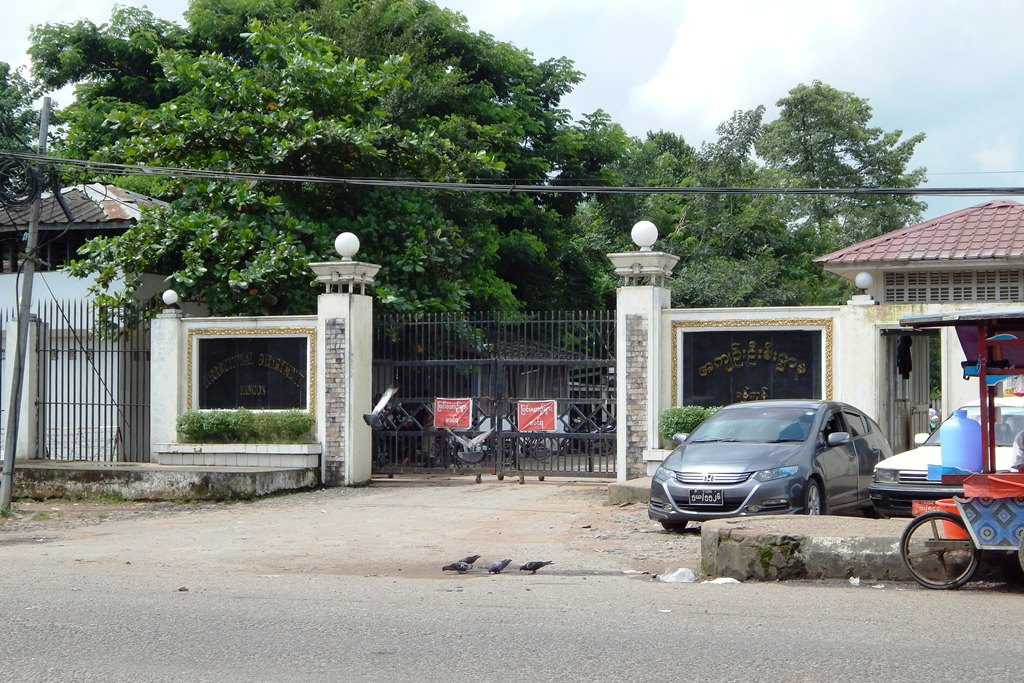
- Interactive map of Myingyan Prison
- Location: Myingyan District, Mandalay Region, Myanmar; 21°28′12.36″N 95°23′40.2″E
- Status: Operational
- Managed by: Ministry of Home Affairs

Myingyan Prison (Burmese: မြင်းခြံဗဟိုအကျဥ်းထောင်) is a prison in Myingyan district, Myanmar. It was most known as the most infamous detention center among Burma's political prisoners for its atrocities from early 1990s to October 1999 when the International Committee of the Red Cross (ICRC) was granted an access to the prison. Before the ICRC visit, several political prisoners died due to starvation and torture.

== History ==
Currently, a number of political prisoners including the ex-military intelligence officials are still serving long prison sentences and only three political detainees from the prison were released on April 17, 2011, when the new government granted an amnesty reducing the prison sentences by one year.

On 7 October 2014, a presidential amnesty by Thein Sein, President of Myanmar, that released 3,000 prisoners nationwide resulted in the release of Thein Swe from Myingyan prison. He had almost served 10-years of his 146-year sentence. Thein Swe was the only ex-Military Intelligence personnel released from the prison by the amnesty.

In October 2016, a three-hour protest began at 7 a.m. calling on the removal of the prison warden, the right for prisoners to freely move between prison buildings, end to work on plantations, and that the prison provide them with more than three blankets. In response, a committee was formed to investigate the warden, while the other prisoner demands were denied.

=== Since 2021 coup ===
On 21 May 2023, prison superintendent Tin Cho began a "100-day project" to crack down on the use of phones smuggled into the prison by bribed prison officials. This resulted in at least 20 political prisoners requiring medical treatment after being tortured in solitary confinement. From May 21 to 24, 13 political prisoners were taken and tortured at the Light Infantry Battalion 15 base in Myingyan. On May 23, political prisoners began a hunger strike after eight political prisoners were taken for interrogation.

In June 2023, there were around 200 political prisoners held in Myingyan prison, but by August 2023 it increased to 800, mainly young men and women held for anti-junta activities. On 1 August, more than 100 prisoners were released from Myingyan prison as part of an amnesty announced by the junta.

== Conditions ==
=== Living conditions ===
U Aung Myo Kyaw of the Assistance Association for Political Prisoners said in 2016 that the health standards in Myingyan prison was substandard due to overcrowding.

=== Atrocities and torture ===
One account describing prison practices include an order for a group of political prisoners to spend hours catching flies, shining the iron cell doors, and polishing the bare ground in their cells with the base of a small bottle. There are also instances when prisoners were interrogated for months and being they are transferred to prison or isolation cells and subjected to repeated degradation. The oppressive heat also often aggravate the passions inside the prison. For instance, it was said that parched criminals turn the prison into the worst of worst, smashing jailed politicians while wardens looked on laughing. The violence was recently demonstrated in the case of a 2016 prison melee where inmates engaged in violent clash after one prisoner was ordered into solitary confinement.

Swe Win, who was imprisoned in Myingyan prison from 1999 to 2005, said in an article for Asia Times in 2009 that up until the ICRC visit to the prison in October 1999, he experienced various forms of torture at Myingyan. On his first day at Myingyan, he said that he was first beaten in a cell and then by ten non-political prisoners in the presence of a prison officer.

== Notable prisoners ==
- Swe Win, imprisoned from 1999 to 6 July 2005 for participation in anti-government activities. Released by amnesty.
- Thein Swe, imprisoned from 19 October 2004 to 7 October 2014 during a purge of Myanmar's Military Intelligence. Released by amnesty.
- Myint Naing, former chief minister of Sagaing Region, imprisoned since 2 August 2022.
- Zaw Zaw, former photojournalist for The Irrawaddy, imprisoned since 2022.
