= Htin Linn Aung =

Burmese politician

U Htin Linn Aung
- ထင်လင်းအောင်

Union Minister of Communications, Information and Technology of the National Unity Government of Myanmar
- Incumbent
- Assumed office 22 February 2021

Personal details
- Born: Nyaungdon, Ayeyarwady Region, Myanmar
- Party: National League for Democracy
- Education: University of Maryland
- Occupation: Politician, social activist and computer scientist

U Htin Linn Aung (Burmese: ထင်လင်းအောင်; also spelt Htin Lin Aung) is a Burmese politician, social activist, former prisoner of conscience, and computer scientist who currently serves as the Union Minister of Communications, Information and Technology of the National Unity Government of Myanmar.

== Early life and education ==
Htin Linn Aung was born in Nyaungdon, Maubin District, Ayeyarwady Region and was an alumnus of Rangoon Institute of Technology. He completed his bachelor's degree in Science in Computer Network and Security from the University of Maryland.

== Political career ==
He joined the student movements in 1996 and 1998 during his university years at the Rangoon Institute of Technology (RIT). In 2000, he was sentenced to prison for seven years for his involvement in the student movement at Pyay Technological University.

He moved to Maryland in 2008 after taking part in the Saffron Revolution.

On 22 February 2021, when CRPH's international relations office was opened in Maryland, Htin Linn Aung was appointed as its special representative.
