= Lwin Ko Latt =

Burmese politician

U Lwin Ko Latt
- လွင်ကိုလတ်
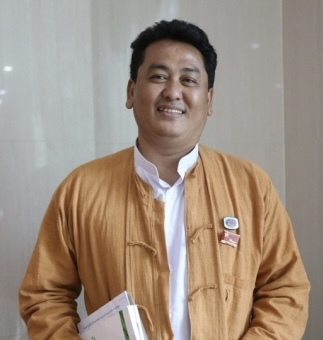
- Lwin Ko Latt in 2021

Member of the Committee Representing Pyidaungsu Hluttaw
- Incumbent
- Assumed office 5 February 2021

Member of the Pyithu Hluttaw
- In office 1 February 2016 – 1 February 2021
- Constituency: Thanlyin Township
- Majority: 70,380

Personal details
- Born: 20 January 1976 (age 50) Rangoon, Myanmar
- Party: National League for Democracy
- Occupation: Activist, politician

Lwin Ko Latt (Burmese: လွင်ကိုလတ်) is a Burmese activist and politician who served as a member of the House of Representatives from Thanlyin Township from 2016 until his removal from office in the 2021 Myanmar coup d'état. He is a member of the Committee Representing Pyidaungsu Hluttaw.

== Political career ==
In the 2015 Myanmar general election, Lwin Ko Latt contested in Thanlyin Township constituency for Pyithu Hluttaw, from National League for Democracy, and won a seat by 70,380 votes.

In the 2020 Myanmar general election, he was re-elected as an MP for Thanlyin Township but was not allowed to assume his seat due to the military coup d'état.

On 5 February 2021, in the aftermath of the 2021 Myanmar coup d'état, he became a member of the Committee Representing Pyidaungsu Hluttaw.

On 2 March 2021, CRPH named him Acting Minister of the Office of the President and Acting Minister of the Union Government Office.
