= Myingyan Township =

Township in Mandalay Region, Myanmar

- Township
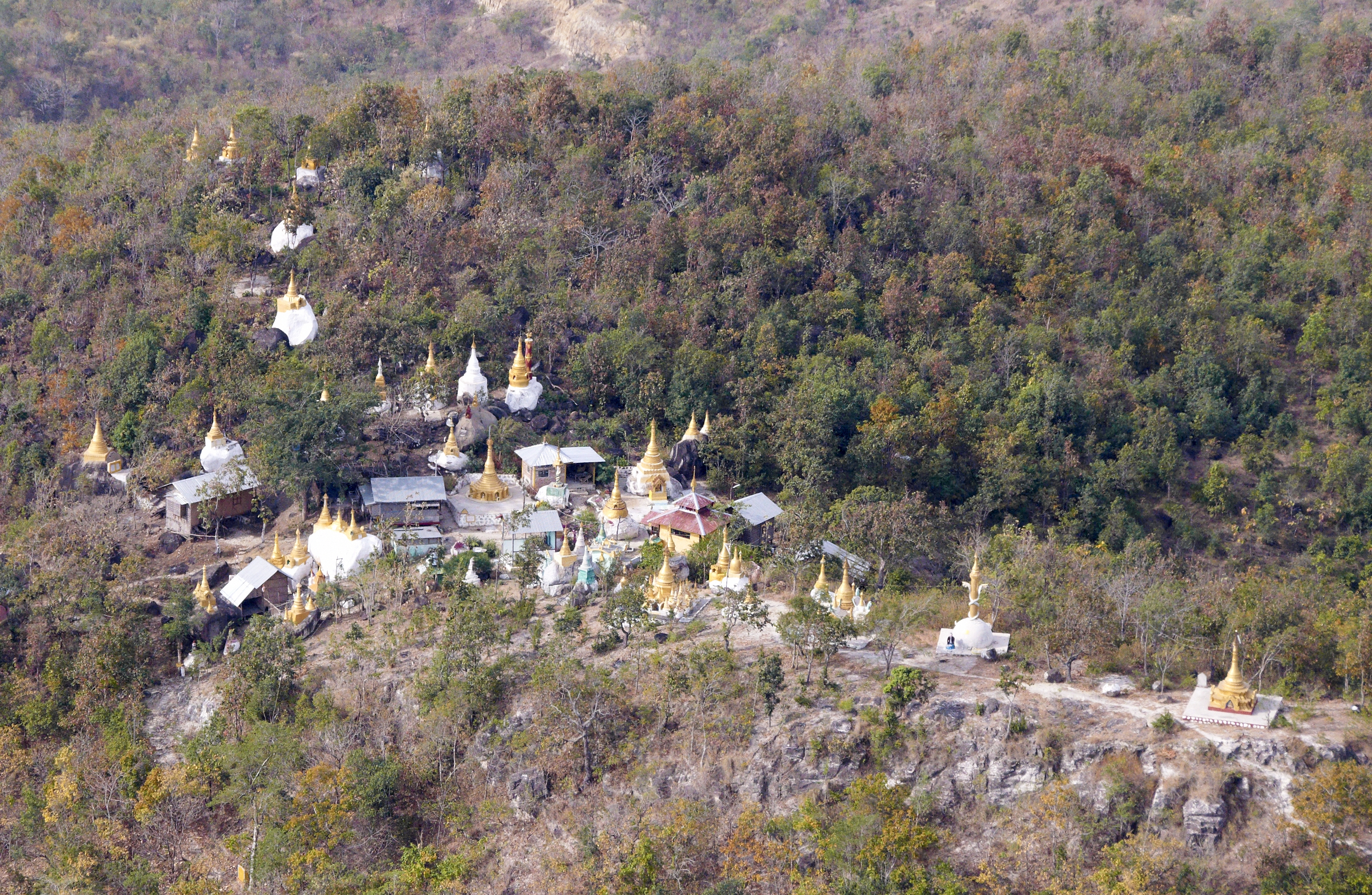
- In 2009

- Location in Myingyan district

- Location within Myanmar
- Coordinates: 21°22′N 95°28′E
- Country: Myanmar
- Region: Mandalay Region
- District: Myingyan District
- Capital: Myingyan

Area
  - Total: 374.3 sq mi (969 km^{2})

Population (2023)
  - Total: 289,278
  - Density: 772.9/sq mi (298.4/km^{2})
- Time zone: UTC+6:30 (MMT)

Myingyan (Burmese: မြင်းခြံမြို့နယ်) is a township of Myingyan District in the Mandalay Division of Burma. The township covers an area of 374.3 square miles (969 km^{2}) and as of 2014 it had a population of 276,190 people. In 2023, it had a population of 289,278 people. The township has 2 towns- the principal town of Myingyan and Simeekhon, which comprise a total of 24 urban wards. The township also has 183 villages grouped together into 64 village tracts.

== History ==
The Treaty of Yandabo which ended the First Anglo-Burmese War (1824–1826), was signed at Yandabo village in the township on 24 February 1826.

According to the Myingyan People’s Strike Committee, from 11 to 14 March 2024, the Tatmadaw raided at least six villages in Myingyan Township, killing nine civilians, as part of the Myanmar Civil War. The committee also stated that several houses were burnt by the Tatmadaw, including 200 homes in Pyogan. This was in retaliation to an anti-junta ambush in Myingyan on March 11.

== Geography ==
=== Villages ===
Myingyan Township contains 183 villages. A proportion of them are listed below:

- Aingma
- Aleywa
- Anein
- Aneintaunggyun
- Balon
- Chaungdaung
- Chaungdaung North
- Chaungdaung South
- Chaungle
- Chinbyitkyin
- Chize
- Daungthit
- Dulabo
- Duwun
- Gaunggwe
- Gwebinyo
- Gwegyo
- Hnatchodaw
- Kaing
- Kaingywathit
- Kalaywa
- Kanbu
- Kandaw
- Kangyaw
- Kanni
- Kanni
- Kanywa
- Kanzin
- Kanzwe
- Kan Pauk
- Khaungsin
- Kinmagan
- Kokke
- Kunzaik
- Kuywa
- Kyagan
- Kyaukkan
- Kyauktaing
- Kyauktan
- Kyaukyan
- Kyaungbyugan
- Kyibingan
- Kyigaung
- Kyiywa
- Kyungale
- Ledan
- Le-thit
- Letthamagan
- Magyizu
- Mayogon
- Mibauk
- Minnegon
- Myaukkon
- Myingyan
- Myintha
- Myogyigon
- Nabuaing
- Nanywa
- Nata
- Ngaginge
- Nyaungbin
- Nyaungbin
- Nyaungdo
- Nyaungkaya
- Nyaungwun
- Okshitkon
- Pagan
- Pauksein
- Paungbya
- Paungga
- Petbinaing
- Petyin
- Pinle
- Potokbyu
- Pyawbwe
- Pyogan
- Pyudwingon
- Sagyu
- Saka
- Shwebawgon
- Shwebontha
- Shwega
- Singut
- Sonywa
- Talôkmyo
- Tanaungdaing
- Tatywa
- Taungauk
- Taungbon
- Taunggan
- Taungshe
- Tawbu
- Taywinbo
- Tebin
- Tegyiywa
- Teinban
- Thamongaing
- Thanbo
- Thebyuwa
- Theingon
- Theinywa
- Theinywa
- Thetkekyin
- Thinbyun
- Thitpinshe
- Thityon
- Udaya
- Yandabo
- Yedaing
- Yondozwe
- Ywashe
- Ywatha
- Ywathaponywa
- Ywathaya
- Ywathit
- Ywazi
- Zalatkon
- Zibingan
- Zidaw.kula
- Htanpinkan
