= Taungtha Township =

- Township
- Location in Myingyan district

- Location within Myanmar
- Coordinates: 21°16′N 95°27′E
- Country: Burma
- Division: Mandalay Division
- District: Myingyan District
- Capital: Taungtha

Area
  - Total: 507.21 sq mi (1,313.7 km^{2})

Population (2014)
  - Total: 216,399
  - Density: 426.65/sq mi (164.73/km^{2})
- Time zone: UTC+6:30 (MMT)

Taungtha Township is a township of Myingyan District in the Mandalay Region of Burma (Myanmar). Its principal town and administrative seat is Taungtha. The township covers an area of 507.21 square miles (1,313.7 km^{2}) and as of 2014 it had a population of 216,399 people.

== History ==
Now called Taungtha was a village under the Kyaukyit(Kyaukyin) as the name of Aingtha. There are so many famous people are arose from Taungtha. The township is known for being the birthplace and hometown of Tin Moe, U Bo and a Burmese poet who was born in the village of Kyauk kar and Aung Thaung, a Burmese politician and businessman born on 1 December 1940, who served as a member of the country's lower house, the Pyithu Hluttaw representing the township after being elected in the 2010 general election.

With 6.8 magnitude August 2016 Myanmar earthquake struck at 5:04 p.m. on August 24, 2016, 25 kilometers west of Chauk in Magway Region, at a depth of 84 kilometers, historic temples and pagodas in the township were damaged.

== Administration ==
Head of administration for the township in 2017 was U Wai Lin Tun.

== Geography ==
=== Villages ===
The township contains 243 villages. A proportion of them are listed below:

Ashebette, Ashe-magyibin, Aungtha, Ayadaw, AyeYwa, Bwetnge, Byaing-in, Byaingmabyu, Chaungbauk, Chaunggwa, Chaungwin, Chaungzon, Chongyi, Dandaing, Gaungsegan, Gwehmyaunggon, Hleguma, Inde North, Inde South, Kadetkon, Kaing, Kamye, Kanbauk, Kanbin, Kanbingwe, Kandaw, Kandaw, Kangyi, Kanywa, Kanzin, Kathitpin, Kebinzin, Kokkogyin, Konpato, Kyaaing, Kyatti, Kyaukchaw, Kyaukka, Kyaukpon, Kyaukpu, Kyauktalon, Kyaukyin, Kyaungo, Kyunywa, Kyunzu, Kywegyan, Kywezin, Legwetkyi, Legyaing, Letpangyun, Letthegyin, Lowandaung, Lundaung, Magyibinde, Magyigon, Magyigon, Magyigyo, Magyikahla, Mayogon, Mibauk East, Mibauk West, Mingan, Mingyun, Minyin, Modeinbyin, Monaunggin, Myaukywa, Myebyugon, Myinde, Myoba, Nabugyin, Namozin, Ngabinzin, Ngwedaung, Nwabyin, Nwade, Nwagu, Nwasaung, Nyandaw, Nyaungchaung, Nyaungdo, Nyaunggan, Nyaunggon, Nyinyaung, Obo, Okshitkyin, Onbindaw, Pabaung, Padatsakon, Padi, Paket-magyibin, Palin, Paukkan, Payahla, Pegingyaw, Pettaw, Pyatthatgyi, Sagyan, Sedaw, Shaukpin, Simigan, Simigangon, Sinthe, Sizongon, Sonde, Songon, Tamagon, Tanaunggaing, Ta-naunggon, Tanbingan, Tanbingan, Tanbingan North, Tanbingan South, Tanbingyan, Taungbalon, Taunggon, Taungtha, Teya, Thabaung, Thabutpinde, Thabyebin, Thadè , Thamandaw, Thanbo, Thandan, Thangon, Thayetkan, Thazi, Thedaw, Thetngegyin, Thibingon, Thigon, Uyin, Welaung, Yabe, Yanginthazi, Yega, Yonbin, Yondaw, Yonzingale, Yonzingyi, Ywadanshe, Ywatamaik, Ywatha-e, Ywathit, Ywathit, Zibyugan.
