= Myingyan =

Myingyan မြင်းခြံမြို့
- Town
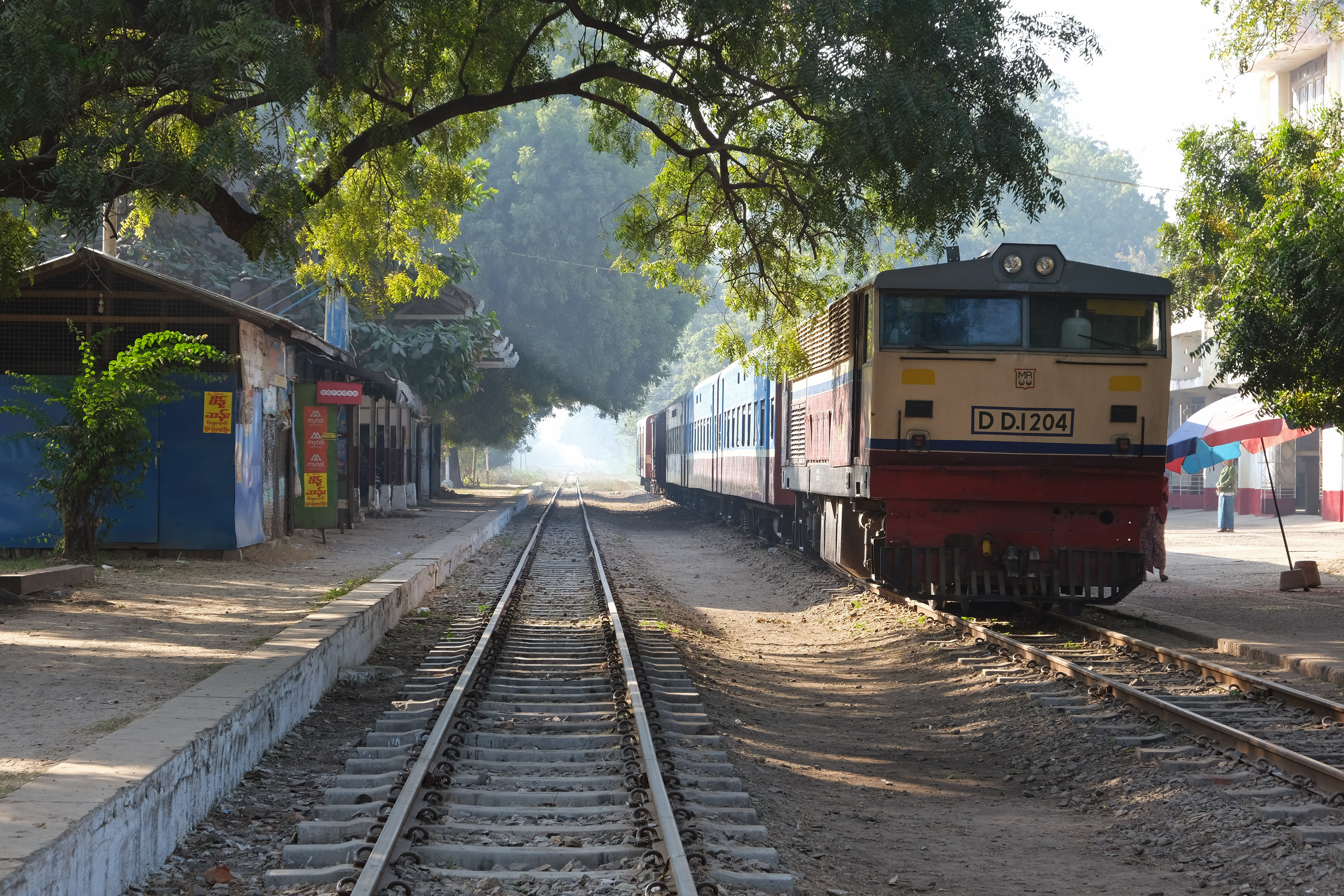
- Myingyan railway station

- Location in Myanmar
- Coordinates: 21°27′36″N 95°23′18″E
- Country: Myanmar
- Region: Mandalay Region
- District: Myingyan District
- Township: Myingyan Township

Area
  - Total: 9.58296 km^{2} (3.70000 sq mi)

Population (2014)
  - Total: 91,542
- Time zone: UTC+6.30 (MST)

Myingyan (Burmese: မြင်းခြံ, MLCTS: mrang:hkram, [mjɪ́ɰ̃d͡ʑàɰ̃]) is a city and district in the Mandalay Division of central Myanmar, previously, it was a district in the Meiktila Division of Upper Burma. It is currently the capital of Myingyan Township and lies along the National Highway 2. As of 2014, the city had a population of 276,096 and the district had 1,055,957.

It lies in the valley of the Ayeyarwady River, to the south of Mandalay, on the east bank of the river. The area around the city is flat, especially to the north and along the banks of the Ayeyarwady. Inland the country rises in gently undulating slopes. The most noticeable feature is Popa Hill, an extinct volcano, to the south-east. The highest peak is 4,962 feet (1,512 m). above sea-level. The climate is dry, with high south winds from March until September. The annual rainfall averages about 35 inches (890 mm). The temperature varies between 70 and 106 °F (21 and 41 °C). The ordinary crops are millet, sesame, cotton, maize, rice and a great variety of peas and beans. There are no forests, but a great deal of low scrubland. Myingyan is the head of the branch railway to Thazi and the main line between Yangon and Mandalay.

Myingyan Prison in Myingyan District was known as the most infamous detention center among Burma's political prisoners for its atrocities from early 1990s' to October 1999 when the International Committee for Red Cross (ICRC) was granted an access to the prison.

Clashes broke out in and around the town in August 2024 between Myanmar's military junta and the People's Defense Force, during the country's ongoing civil war.

== Climate ==
Myingyan has a hot semi-arid climate (Köppen BSh) as the city lies in the rain shadow of the Arakan Mountains which dry the monsoon rains as they descend into the central Irrawaddy Basin.

Climate data for Myingyan
Month	Jan	Feb	Mar	Apr	May	Jun	Jul	Aug	Sep	Oct	Nov	Dec	Year
Mean daily maximum °C (°F)	29.1 (84.4)	32.5 (90.5)	36.6 (97.9)	39.1 (102.4)	36.7 (98.1)	34.2 (93.6)	33.5 (92.3)	33.1 (91.6)	33.0 (91.4)	32.7 (90.9)	30.6 (87.1)	28.2 (82.8)	33.3 (91.9)
Daily mean °C (°F)	21.2 (70.2)	24.1 (75.4)	28.3 (82.9)	32.0 (89.6)	31.2 (88.2)	29.9 (85.8)	29.3 (84.7)	29.1 (84.4)	28.8 (83.8)	28.2 (82.8)	25.1 (77.2)	21.7 (71.1)	27.4 (81.3)
Mean daily minimum °C (°F)	13.4 (56.1)	15.8 (60.4)	20.1 (68.2)	25.0 (77.0)	25.7 (78.3)	25.6 (78.1)	25.2 (77.4)	25.1 (77.2)	24.7 (76.5)	23.7 (74.7)	19.7 (67.5)	15.3 (59.5)	21.6 (70.9)
Average rainfall mm (inches)	1.2 (0.05)	2.5 (0.10)	2.9 (0.11)	17.6 (0.69)	91.4 (3.60)	85.1 (3.35)	57.2 (2.25)	105.8 (4.17)	151.7 (5.97)	101.6 (4.00)	25.8 (1.02)	3.6 (0.14)	646.4 (25.45)
Source 1: Norwegian Meteorological Institute
Source 2:
