= Zin Mar Aung =

Burmese politician (born 1976)

Her Excellency Daw Zin Mar Aung
- ဒေါ်ဇင်မာအောင်
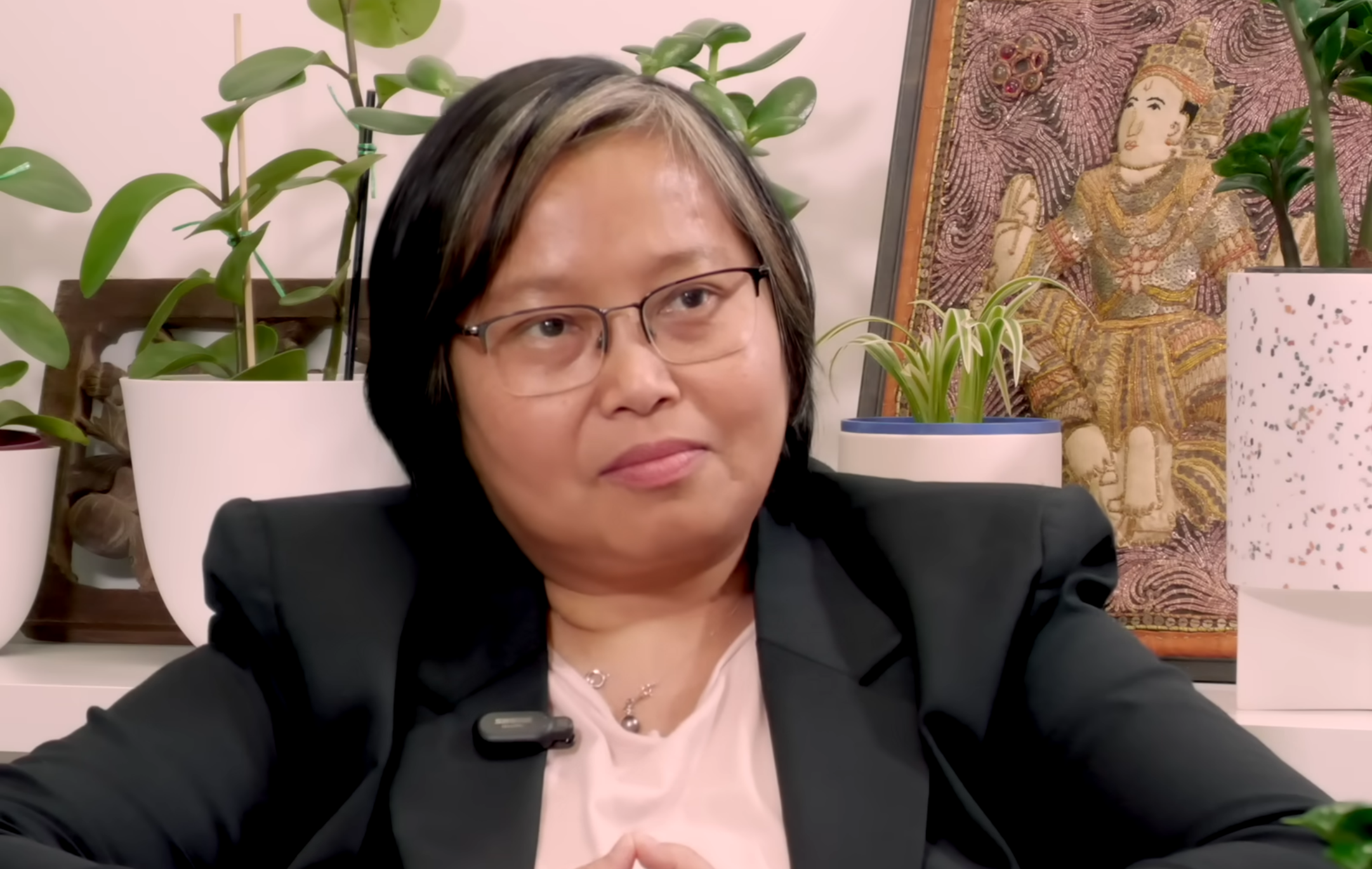
- Zin Mar Aung in 2025

Minister of Foreign Affairs of the National Unity Government of Myanmar
- Incumbent
- Assumed office 16 April 2021
- President: Duwa Lashi La (acting)
- Preceded by: Office established

Member of the Committee Representing Pyidaungsu Hluttaw
- Incumbent
- Assumed office 15 February 2021

Member of the Pyithu Hluttaw
- In office 1 February 2016 – 1 February 2021
- Preceded by: Thar Win
- Constituency: Yankin Township
- Majority: 27,392 (77.49%)

Personal details
- Born: 14 June 1976 (age 50) Rangoon, Myanmar
- Party: National League for Democracy
- Parent(s): Aung Kyi (father); Yi Yi Myint (mother)
- Education: University of Distance Education, Yangon
- Occupation: Activist; Politician
- Awards: International Women of Courage Award (2012); Young Global Leader (2014)
- Website: facebook.com/OfficialZinMarAung

Zin Mar Aung (Burmese: ဇင်မာအောင်; born 14 June 1976) is a Burmese politician, activist, and former political inmate who is serving as the Minister of Foreign Affairs for the National Unity Government of Myanmar. She previously served as a House of Representatives MP for Yankin Township Constituency from 2016 until her removal from office in the 2021 Myanmar coup d'état.

== Early life and education ==
Zin Mar Aung was born on 14 June 1976 in Rangoon, Myanmar. She graduated with a degree in botany from the University of Distance Education, Yangon.

== Political career and movements ==
Zin Mar Aung, while a university student in the 1990s, became active in the opposition to Burma's military government. In 1998, she was arrested at a peaceful protest rally for reading a poem and statement calling on the military government to respect the results of elections. She was detained and convicted before a military tribunal, which did not permit her to be represented by an attorney. Zin Mar Aung was sentenced to 28 years in prison. She spent 11 years as a political prisoner, nearly nine years of which were in solitary confinement. In 2009, she was suddenly released from captivity and she resumed her civil society activities, She created a cultural impact studies group to spread the idea that Asian culture and democracy are compatible, as well as a self-help association for female ex-political prisoners and Yangon School of Political Science.

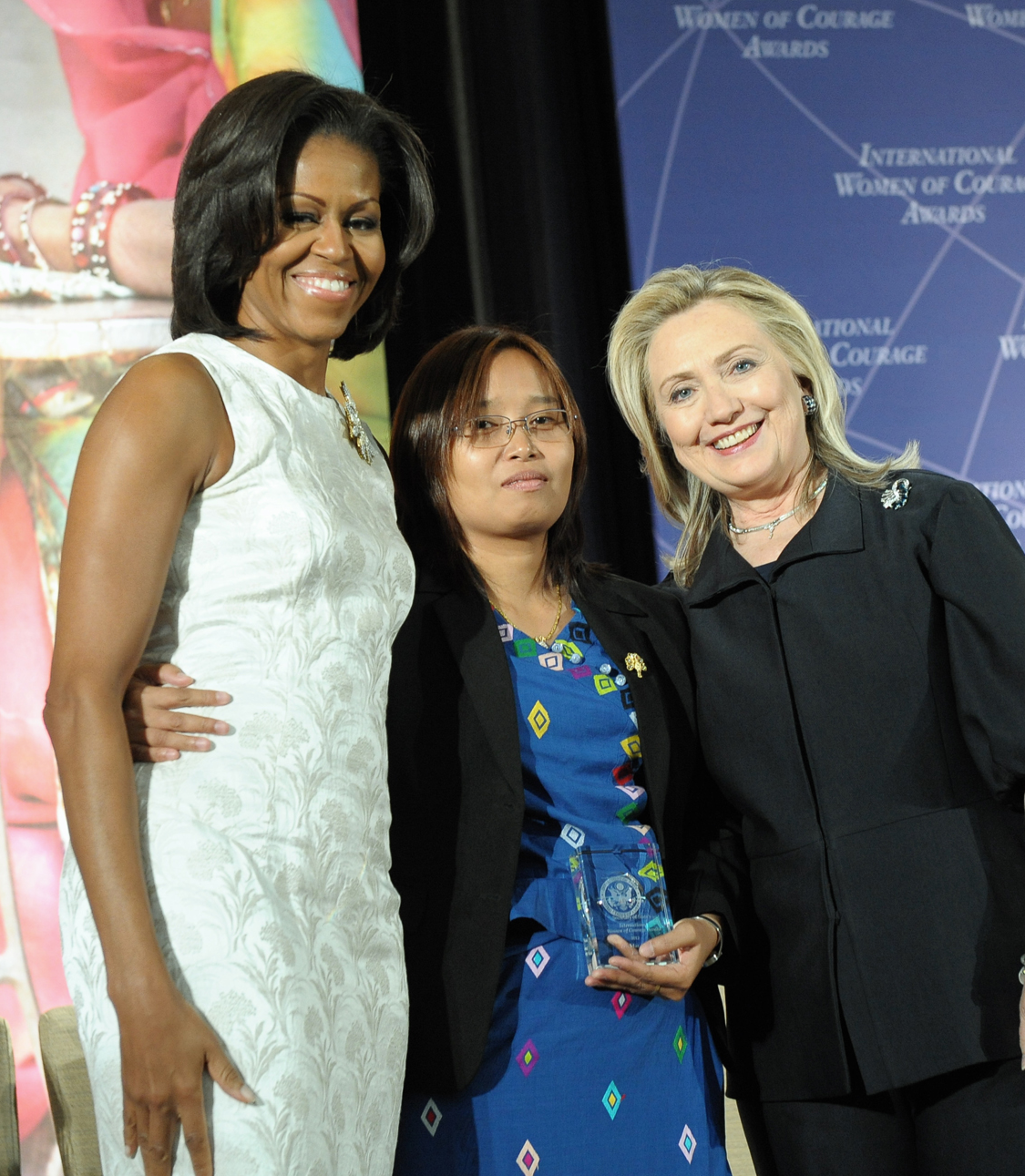
former First Lady Michelle Obama, Zin Mar Aung and Hillary Clinton at the 2012 International Women of Courage Awards Ceremony

Zin Mar Aung has founded a number of civil society groups dealing with democratic development, women's empowerment, ethnic tolerance, and providing assistance to former prisoners of conscience. The Rainfall group encourages greater women's participation in public life and the Yangon School of Political Science educates young Burmese about politics and democracy. In 2012, she leads an organization to raise awareness of issues affecting ethnic minorities in conflict areas. At the time, she was recognized by U.S. Secretary of State Hillary Rodham Clinton as a recipient of the annual “International Women of Courage Award”. As of 2013 she is working with the International Foundation for Electoral Systems on women's political empowerment under the Global Women's Leadership Fund.

In the 2015 Myanmar general election, she contested the Yankin Township constituency for House of Representatives and won a seat by 27,392 votes.

In the 2020 Myanmar general election, re-elect House of Representatives MP for Yankin Township but was not allowed to assume her seat due to a military coup.

On 15 February 2021, in the aftermath of the 2021 Myanmar coup d'état, she became a member of the Committee Representing Pyidaungsu Hluttaw.

On 2 March 2021, the Committee Representing Pyidaungsu Hluttaw named her Acting Union Minister of Foreign Affairs in its cabinet.
