= Okkar Min =

Burmese politician

Member of the Amyotha Hluttaw
- In office 1 February 2016 – 1 February 2021
- Constituency: Tanintharyi No.8
- Majority: 23,771 votes

Personal details
- Born: 4 November 1984 (age 41) Yangon, Burma (Myanmar)
- Party: National League for Democracy
- Spouse: Phyu Phyu Lwin
- Parent(s): Myint Soe (father); Thet Thet Swe (mother)
- Education: Myeik University

Okkar Min (Burmese: ဦးဥက္ကာမင်း, born 4 November 1984) is a Burmese politician who served as a House of Nationalities member of parliament for Tanintharyi No. 8 constituency from 2016 until his removal from office in the 2021 Myanmar coup d'état. He is a member of the National League for Democracy.

== Early life and education ==
Okkar was born on 4 November 1984 in Yangon, Myanmar. He graduated B.Sc(Maths) from Myeik University.

== Political career ==
Okkar was elected as an Amyotha Hluttaw MP, winning a majority of 46,420 votes from Tanintharyi Region No.8 parliamentary constituency.

He also served as a member of Amyotha Hluttaw Local and Overseas Employment Committee.
