= Wai Phyo Aung =

Burmese politician

- ဝေဖြိုးအောင်
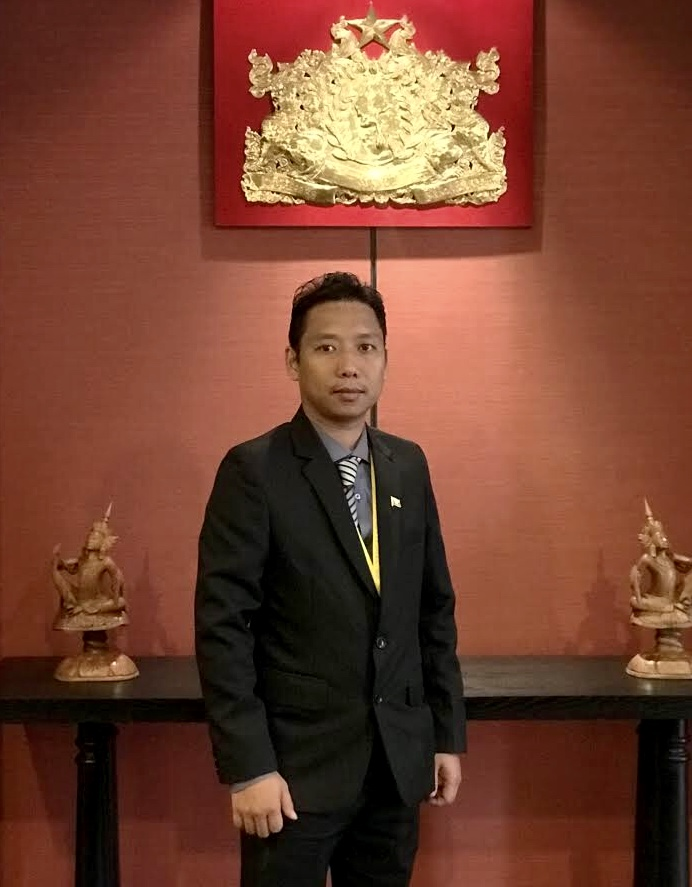
- Wai Phyo Aung in 2019

Member of the House of Representatives (Myanmar)
- In office 3 February 2016 – 1 February 2021
- Constituency: Thaketa Township

Personal details
- Born: 15 May 1985 (age 41) Yangon, Myanmar
- Party: National League for Democracy
- Parent(s): Tin Win (father); Than Than Win (mother)
- Education: University of Medicine 2, Yangon
- Occupation: Politician; physician

Wai Phyo Aung (Burmese: ဝေဖြိုးအောင်; born 15 May 1985) is a Burmese politician and medical doctor served as a member of parliament in the House of Representatives for Thaketa Township constituency from 2016 until his removal from office in the 2021 Myanmar coup d'état. He is a member of the National League for Democracy.

== Early life and education ==
Wai Phyo Aung was born on 15 May 1985 in Thaketa Township, Yangon Region. He graduated with M.B.B.S. from University of Medicine 2, Yangon in 2007. He is also a doctor and opened clinic in Yangon.

== Political career ==
He is a member of the National League for Democracy Party. In the 2015 election, he was elected as a Pyithu Hluttaw MP for Thaketa Township parliamentary constituency.
