= University of Medicine 2, Yangon =

Medical school in Yangon, Myanmar

Coordinates: 16°54′9.36″N 96°9′17.82″E

- ဆေးတက္ကသိုလ်၂ ရန်ကုန်
- Motto: ဥပဌာနံ အနုကမ္မာ ဒယာ (Pali: upaṭhānaṃ, anukammā, dayā)
- Motto in English: Service, Sympathy, Humanity
- Type: Public
- Established: 15 July 1963; 63 years ago
- Affiliations: Ministry of Health and Sports (Myanmar)
- Rector: Moe Wint Aung
- Students: 3021 (2018)
- Location: North Okkalapa, Yangon, Yangon Division, Myanmar
- Website: www.um2ygn.edu.mm

The University of Medicine 2, Yangon (Burmese: ဆေးတက္ကသိုလ်(၂) ရန်ကုန် [sʰé tɛʔkəθò n̥ɪʔ (jàɰ̃ɡòʊɰ̃)]; formerly, Institute of Medicine 2) is a university of medicine, located in North Okkalapa, Yangon, Myanmar. The university offers M.B., B.S. degrees and graduate (diploma, master's and doctoral) degrees in medical science. The university is one of the most selective in the country, and accepts approximately 300 students annually based solely on their University Entrance Examination scores.

University of Medicine 2, Yangon is one of five medical schools in Burma recognized by the Educational Commission for Foreign Medical Graduates.

== History ==
The university was opened initially in Mingaladon in the outskirts of Yangon as Medical College 2, as an affiliated college of Yangon University on 15 July 1963. The college became Institute of Medicine 2, an independent university per the University Act of 1964. The Institutes of Medicine were transferred to the Ministry of Health from the Ministry of Education on 1 October 1973 and were supervised by the Department of Medical Education. The Department of Medical Education is now designated as the Department of Medical Sciences as the production of all categories of human resources for health come under its jurisdiction. The institute was moved to the present campus in North Okkalapa on 25 September 1996 and is now situated approximately 12 miles (19 km) from downtown Yangon.

In 1963, the 1000-bed Defence Services General Hospital was affiliated as the only teaching hospital of the institute. Affiliated hospitals include North Okkalapa General Hospital (since 1970), Insein General Hospital (since 1973), Thingangyun Model Hospital (since 1996), South Okkalapa Maternal and Child Hospital (since 1998), Mawlamyaing General Hospital in Mon State and Pathein General Hospital in Ayeyarwady Division (since 1997), among others.

In 1997, Field Training Centre for Community Medicine was established in Hlegu Township, which is about 13 miles from the campus and one of the townships of the Yangon Division.

As for the graduate medical training, although only 50 students were accepted each year initially, the number of admissions has been increased gradually over the subsequent years. Since the end of the year 2000, the university has been accepting around 500 students every year.

Postgraduate studies for master's degrees in Anatomy and Physiology started in 1973. Currently, the university has been conducting 6 Diploma courses, 19 Master's degree courses, 26 Doctor of Medical Science courses for clinical disciplines, and 8 Ph.D. courses in Basic Medical Science.

== Leadership ==
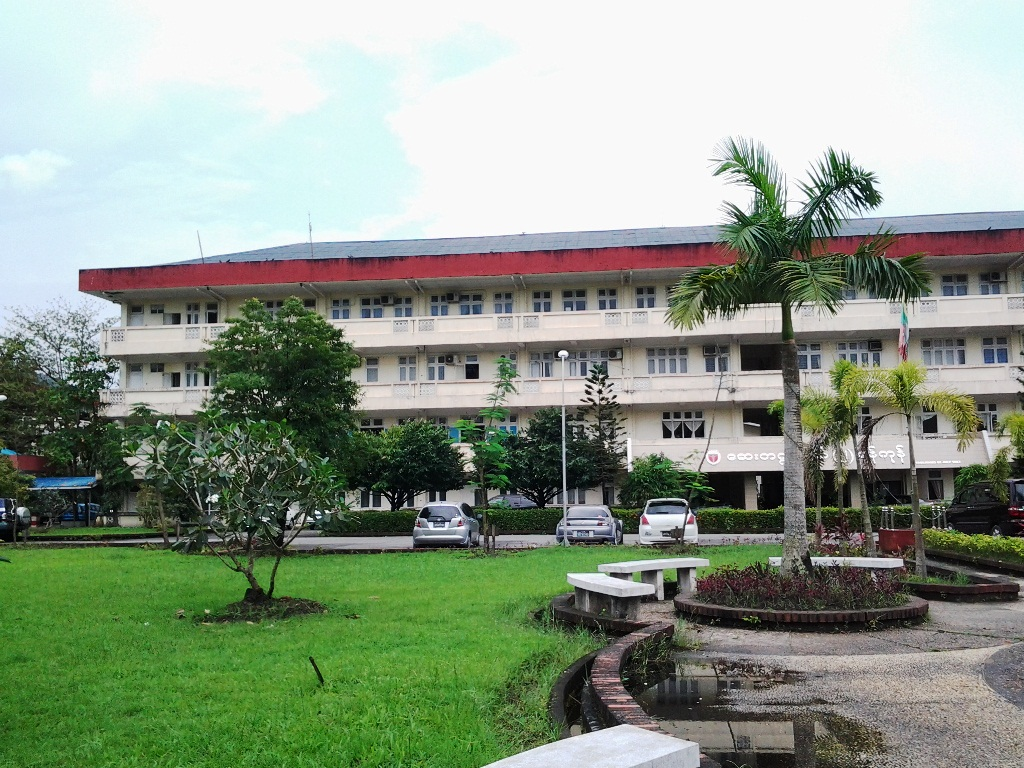
University of Medicine 2, Yangon

Since 1963, UM-2 has been headed by an academic dean known as a rector. Past rectors include:

1. 1963–1967: Ko Ko Gyi
2. 1967–1973: U E
3. 1973–1982: Khin Maung Nyein
4. 1982–1987: Tin Aung Swe
5. 1987–1989: Myo Thwe
6. 1989–1992: Ko Lay
7. 1992–2004: Tha Hla Shwe
8. 2004–2007: Than Nu Shwe
9. 2008–2014: Tint Swe Latt
10. 2014–2015: Zaw Wai Soe
11. 2015–2017: Aye Aung
12. 2017–2021: Aye Tun
13. 2021-2025: Aye Aye Khin
14. 2025-: Moe Wint Aung

== Students' Union ==
University of Medicine - 2 Students' Union was founded in 2015 by twelve students. The main purpose of the Students' Union is to represent the students within the institution. The Students' Union takes part in the administrative affairs of the university, academic affairs, and student affairs as well as political movements.

University of Medicine - 2 Students' Union
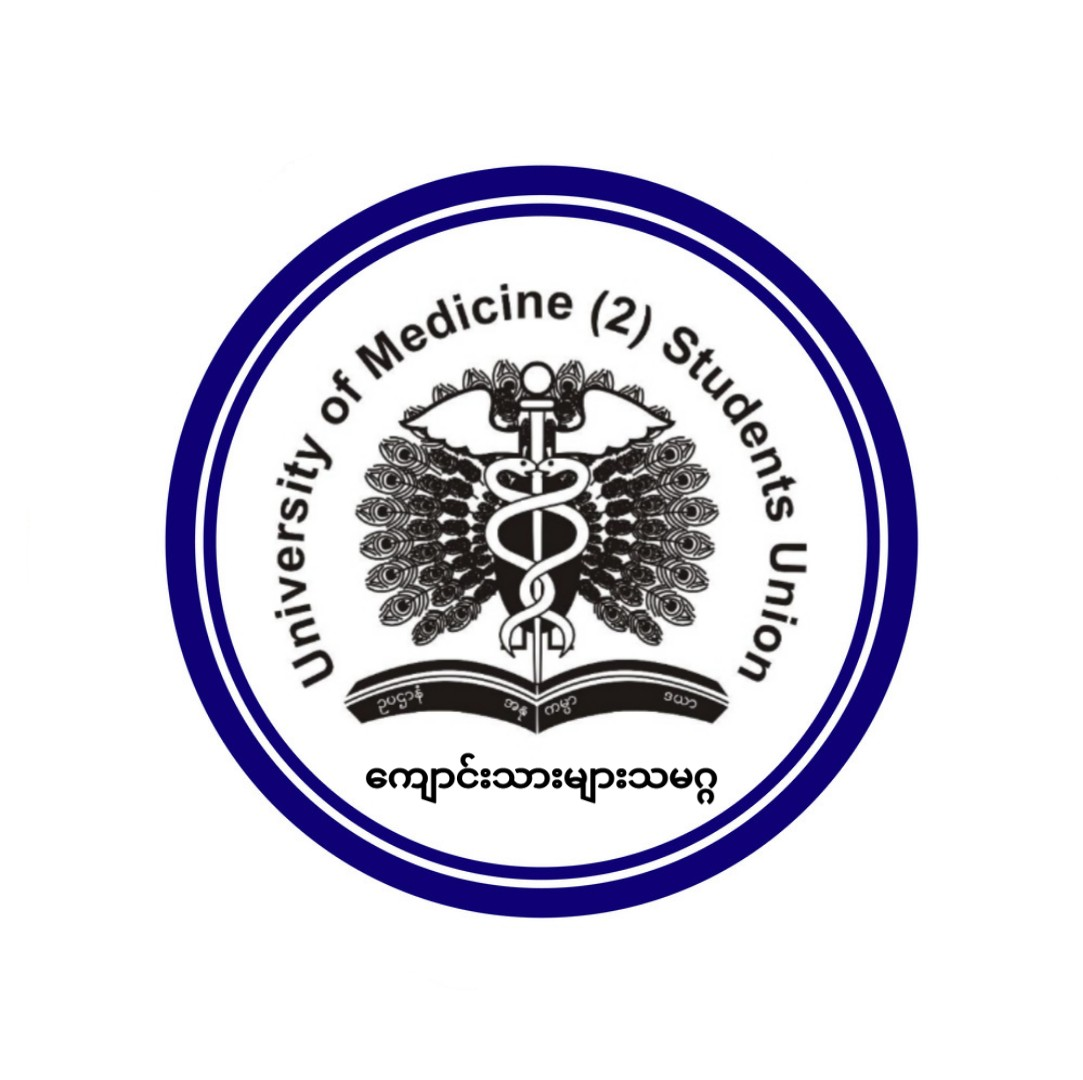
- President: Oaggar Myat
- Secretary: Kaung Khant Oo
- Founded: 2015
- Slogan: samaggānaṃ tapo sukho

== Admissions ==
The University of Medicine 2, Yangon is one of the most selective schools in the nation as the medical schools continue to be the top choice amongst top students in Myanmar. The students who want the admission to this school must make sure that they are in top 0.02% of the total exam candidates in college entrance exam of the year. The school admits about 300 students per year based on their Basic Education High School (college entrance) exam scores and their regions.

== Programs ==
The university is one of three civil universities and one medical academy in Myanmar that offers undergraduate, graduate, and doctoral degrees.

- Bachelor of Medicine and Surgery M.B., B.S.
- Diploma in Medical Science (Dip.Med.Sc.)
- Master of Medical Science (M.Med.Sc.)
- Doctor of Medical Science (Dr.Med.Sc.)
- Ph.D.

== Academic Years ==
=== Integrated curriculum ===
Year	Duration		
Foundation Year	1 year		
Medical Year 1 (System modules)	1 year		
Medical Year 2 (System modules)	1 year		
Medical Year 3 (Junior clerkship)	1 year		
Medical Year 4 (Speciality clerkship)	1 year		
Medical Year 5 (Senior clerkship)	1 year	House Surgeon	1 year
Total	7 years		

=== Old curriculum ===
Year	Duration
First M.B., B.S.	1 year
Second M.B., B.S.	1½year
Third M.B., B.S.	1 year
Final M.B., B.S. Part I	1 year
Final M.B., B.S. Part II	1½year
House Surgeon	1 year
Total	7 years

== Undergraduate curriculum ==
=== Integrated curriculum ===
==== Foundation Year ====
- 1st semester

Language 1 - Myanmar

Language 2 - English

Science 1 - Zoology and Botany

Science 2 - Mathematics & statistics and Physics

Science 3 - Chemistry

- 2nd Semester

Structural Principle - Anatomy

Functional Principle - Physiology

Molecular Principle - Biochemistry

Principle of Disease Mechanism - Pathology

Principle of Medical Microbiology - Microbiology

Principle of Drug Therapy - Pharmacology

==== Medical Year 1 (System Modules) ====
Horizontal Modules

- Module 1 - Musculoskeletal and Skin (MSS)
- Module 2 - Medical Genetics (GEN)
- Module 3 - Cardiovasular System (CVS)
- Module 4 - Respiratory System (RES)
- Module 5 - Gastrointestinal, Liver and Nutrition (GLN)

==== Medical Year 2 (System Modules) ====
Horizontal Modules

- Module 1 - Hematology (HEM)
- Module 2 - Immunology (GEN)
- Module 3 - Endocrinology (END)
- Module 4 -Renal and Reproductive System (RNR)
- Module 5 - Neurology and Mental Health (NNM)

Vertical Modules

- Clinical Skill Management (CSM)
- Community and Family Health (CFH)
- Research and Culture Skills (RCS)
- Ethics and Professionalism (ENP)
- Social and Behavioral Science (SBS)

==== Medical Year 3 (Junior Clerkship) ====
- General Medicine - Infectious diseases, Radiology, Dermatology, EENT
- General Surgery - Orthopedics, Rehabilitation, Forensic
- 4-week Elective

==== Medical Year 4 (Speciality Clerkship) ====
- Pediatrics, Obstetrics and Gynaecology, Psychiatry
- Medicine, Geriatrics, Palliative Care, Surgery, Emergency medicine, Anaesthesia, Forensics
- 4-week Residential Field Trip (RFT)

==== Medical Year 5 (Senior Clerkship) ====
- Medicine
- Surgery
- Obstetrics and Gynaecology
- Pediatrics
- 4-week Student Selected Component (SSC)

=== Traditional curriculum ===
==== First year M.B., B.S ====
- Myanmar
- English
- Mathematics & statistics
- Physics
- Chemistry
- Zoology
- Botany

==== Second year M.B., B.S ====
- Anatomy
- Physiology
- Biochemistry

==== Third year M.B., B.S ====
- General pathology
- Microbiology
- Pharmacology

Students are also posted for 18 weeks each to the medical and surgical wards for clinical training. Exam Marks from the clinical postings are not used in this year. They will be added to the final exam of the final year as “classwork”.

==== Final year (Part I) ====
- Forensic Medicine (with two days a week morgue posting for teaching during post-mortem examination of real cases in North Okkalapa General Hospital)
- Preventive and Social Medicine (with three weeks residential field training in the rural areas and one month of PSM posting which includes healthcare surveying of newly created urban areas and some community care units)
- Systemic Pathology and Hematology

Students attend lectures & clinics in Medicine, Surgery, Child Health, Obstetrics & gynecology, and are posted to the various teaching hospitals, including Urban Health facilities as part of Preventive and Social Medicine teaching.

==== Final year (Part II) ====
Distinguished into 2 parts: Pre-bloc posting and bloc posting

In pre-bloc posting, students are posted to different specialities for overall 4 months in different hospitals. After each posting, students must take multiple choice questions of each subjects.

- Ophthalmology
- ENT
- Anesthesia
- Radiology
- Dermatology
- Infectious medicine
- Psychiatry

In Bloc- posting, students are trained intensively in major speciality through lectures, seminars, presentation, clinical and theory integration and with real patients. Each posting lasts for 3 months and at the end of each posting, students have to take completion tests which composed as written and bedside exam with real patients. Written exam has multiple choice questions and multiple short questions. Bedside exam has at least 3 patients and students have to take OSCE type exams.

- Pediatrics
- Medicine
- Obstetrics and Gynaecology
- Surgery

==== Final Exam of the final year ====
Students have to take 2 parts of exam, written and bedside exam. There are about 3 weeks between these two parts. Written exam lasts for 8 days because each subject has 2 paper of questions as follows.

- Medicine paper 1
- Medicine paper 2
- Surgery paper 1
- Surgery paper 2
- Paediatrics paper 1
- Paediatrics paper 2
- Obstetrics paper
- Gynaecology paper

Bedside exam lasts for 4 days and students are differentiated into 4 groups and they have to take on different days of each subjects. Each table has two examiners, one from own university and another from other universities of medicine in Myanmar. The university use real patients from teaching hospitals. So, the students are banned from teaching hospitals at least one month before the exam to prevent foreknowledge of cases of the patients who are in potential situation to be placed in the exam.

- Medicine bedside exam has

-Imaging section

-Clinical Case section

-OSCE table

-OSCE + history Table

-Communication Table

- Surgery bedside exam has

-Imaging section

-Photo section

-History table

-Physical Examination table

- Paediatrics bedside exam has

-Photo section

-Case section

-OSCE section 1

-OSCE section 2

-History section

- Obstetrics and Gynaecology bedside exam has

-O1 table (History and physical examination of pregnant women or post-partum women)

-O2 table with simulators (Usage of obstetrics instruments such as forceps, Vacuum, And surgical instruments used in LSCS)

-G1 table (History and physical examination of women with gynaecological disease)

-G2 table with instruments used in gynaecology cases such as E&C vacuum or communication table.

The results are usually out in the evening of the final day of the exam. And the students can be addressed as "Doctors" if they pass the exam. So most of them are students who was taking the exam in the morning and became doctors in the evening.

=== Internship ===
All students, after successful completion of the Final Part II examination, are continued to train hands-on for a period of one year as house surgeons in the recognized Teaching Hospitals in Yangon. Training periods are:

Subject	Duration
Pediatrics	2 ½ months
Community Medicine	2 weeks
Internal Medicine	2 months and 20 days
Emergency Medicine	10 days
Obstetrics & Gynaecology	2 ½ months
Anaesthesia	2 weeks
General Surgery	2 months
Orthopaedics	1 month

Only after completion of house-surgeonship M.B., B.S. Degree is offered to the students. Before 1997, the degree was conferred upon completion of the second part of the final year.

== Heads of Departments ==
Department of Medicine - Prof. Aung Kyaw Thu

Department of Surgery - Prof. Moe Myint

Department of O&G -

Department of Pediatrics - Prof. Tin Moe Phyu

Department of Orthopaedics - Prof. Myo Min Oo

Department of Forensic Medicine - Prof. Chan Myae Thein

Department of Pathology - Prof. Nyome May Thyn

Department of Preventive and Social Medicine - Prof. Pa Pa Soe

Department of Microbiology - Prof. Myo Pa Pa Thet Hnin Htwe Aung

Department of Pharmacology - Prof. Myat Myat Soe

Department of Anatomy - Prof. Thitsar Aye Maung Than

Department of Physiology - Prof. Mya Thandar Sein

Department of Biochemistry - Prof. Myat Mon Khine

Department of Anaesthesiology - Prof. Htike

Department of Ophthalmology - Prof. Khine Myat Su

Department of Radiology - Prof. Nu Nu Aye

Department of ORL-HNS - Prof. Phone Myint Tun

Department of Haematology - Prof. Aye Aye Gyi

Department of Rehabilitation Medicine -

Department of Gastroenterology - Prof. Moe Myint Aung

Department of Urology - Prof. Myo Than

Department of Nephrology - Prof. Thuzar Thin

Department of Mental Health - Prof. Nyo Nyo Aung

Department of Cardiology - Prof. Tun Tun Oo

Department of Neurosurgery - Prof. Kyaw Swar Hlaing

Department of Neurology - Prof. Aye Aye Sann

Department of Cardiac Surgery - Prof. Aung Thu

Department of Dermatology - Prof. Myat Sandar Kyaw

Department of Hepatology - Prof. Naing Naing Tun

Department of Chest Medicine -

Department of Endocrinology - Prof. Htet Htet Khin

Department of Maxillofacial Surgery -

Department of Hepatobiliary Surgery -

Department of Oncology - Prof. Phyu Phyu Theint

Department of Tropical Medicine - Prof. Sabai Phyu

Department of Pediatric Surgery -

Department of Emergency Medicine - Prof. Aye Thiri Naing

Department of Medical Education - Prof. Aye Thida

Department of Myanmar - Daw Nan Tawng

Department of English - Daw Tin Hnin Aung

Department of Chemistry - Daw Ei Ei Khaing

Department of Physics -

Department of Zoology -

Department of Botany - Daw Khin May Myint

Department of Maths - Dr. Aye Thanda Swe

== Teaching Hospitals ==
- North okkalapa General Hospital
- Thingangyun Sanpya General Hospital
- Insein General Hospital
- Yankin Children Hospital
- Ywarthargyi Psychiatric Hospital

== Notable alumni ==
- Cynthia Maung
- Ni Ni Khin Zaw
- Chit Thu Wai
- Aye Zan
- Zaw Wai Soe

== See also ==
- List of universities in Myanmar
- Medical Universities (Myanmar)
