= Zaw Wai Soe =

Minister of health and education of the National Unity Government of Myanmar

His Excellency Dr. Zaw Wai Soe
- ဇော်ဝေစိုး
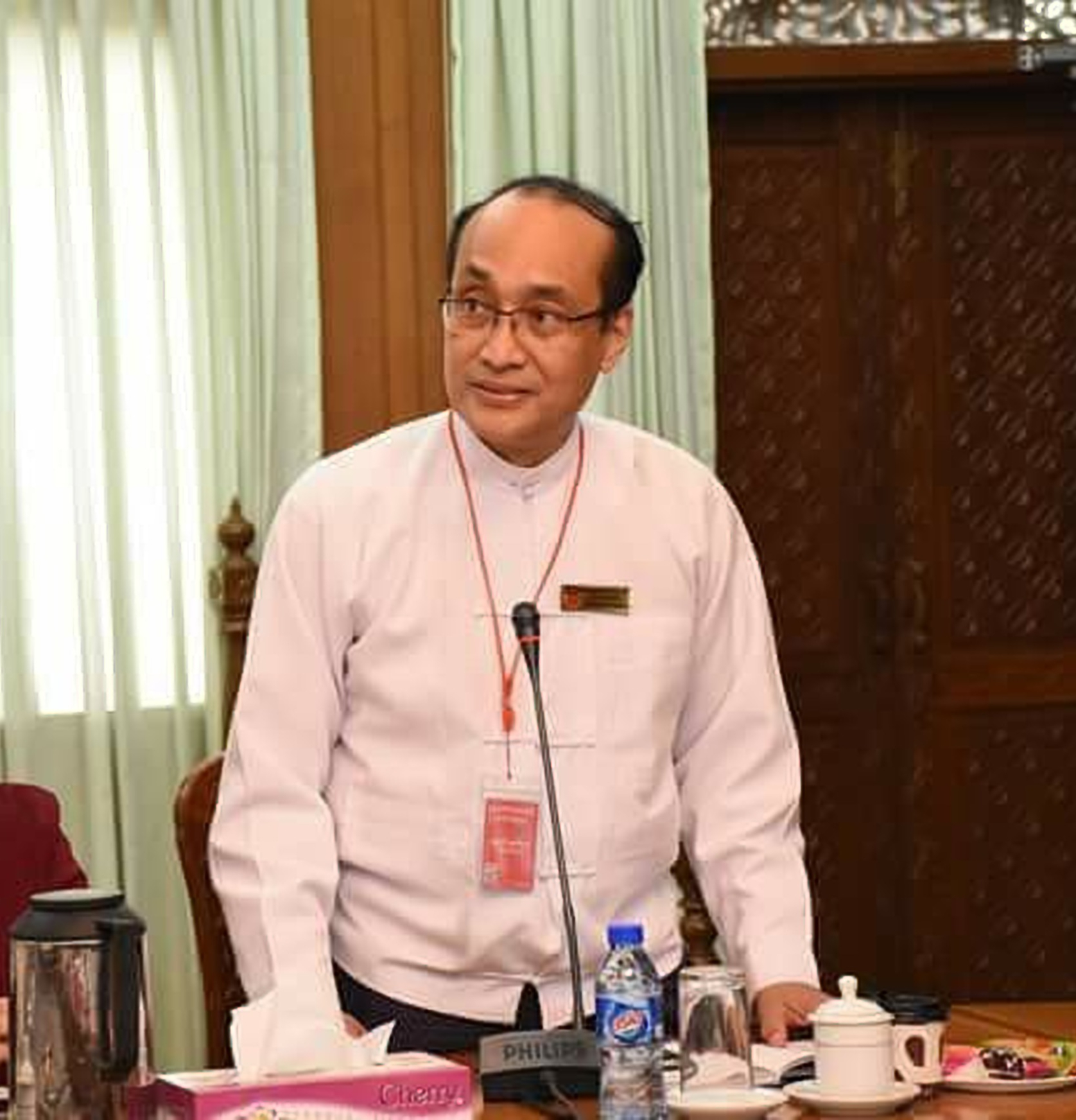
- Rector Zaw Wai Soe in a meeting in 2018

Minister of Education of the National Unity Government of Myanmar
- Incumbent
- Assumed office 16 April 2021
- Appointed by: Committee Representing Pyidaungsu Hluttaw
- President: Duwa Lashi La (acting)
- Preceded by: Office established

Minister of Health of the National Unity Government of Myanmar
- Incumbent
- Assumed office 16 April 2021
- President: Duwa Lashi La (acting)
- Preceded by: Office established

Rector of the University of Medicine 1, Yangon
- In office 20 May 2015 – 1 February 2021
- Appointed by: Committee Representing Pyidaungsu Hluttaw
- Preceded by: Thet Khaing Win

Rector of the University of Medicine 2, Yangon
- In office 2014–2015
- Preceded by: Tint Swe Latt
- Succeeded by: Aye Aung

Personal details
- Born: 1962 (age 63–64) Rangoon, Myanmar
- Education: University of Medicine 2, Yangon (M.B., B.S)
- Occupation: Orthopaedics surgeon, Physician, Professor, Minister

Zaw Wai Soe (Burmese: ဇော်ဝေစိုး) is a Burmese orthopaedics surgeon, physician, professor and politician who currently serves as the Minister for the Ministry of Labour, Immigration and Population, the Ministry of Education, and the Ministry of Health and Sports for National Unity Government since 2 March 2021, appointed by the CRPH. Previously he served as the Rector of the University of Medicine 1, Yangon since 20 May 2015, Rector of the University of Medicine 2, Yangon from 2014 to 2015, and led the task force for reforming sixteen medical related universities in Myanmar.

== Career ==
Zaw Wai Soe graduated with M.B.B.S from University of Medicine 2, Yangon in 1986. Afterwards he served as a civil assistant surgeon for three years in Myingan District Hospital. After coming back from the United Kingdom in 2000, he worked in the Orthopaedic Department of Yangon General Hospital, Yangon Orthopaedic Hospital and was appointed as Rector of the University of Medicine 2, Yangon in 2014.

On 20 May 2015, Zaw was appointed as Rector of the University of Medicine 1, Yangon. He is one of the key founders of spine Surgery and Emergency Medicine in Myanmar.

In 2019, he became the chairman of the Myanmar Rectors' Committee.

In 2020, he played a leading role in Yangon's COVID-19 fight and became the vice chair of Yangon Region COVID-19 Contain, Control and Treating Coordination Committee.

On 10 February 2021, in the aftermath of the 2021 Myanmar coup d'état, he was detained for two hours and questioned about his role in the movement.

On 2 March 2021, he was appointed by the Committee Representing Pyidaungsu Hluttaw as the acting Union Minister for the Ministry of Labour, Immigration and Population, the Ministry of Education, and the Ministry of Health and Sports in its cabinet.

On 5 March 2021, Zaw Wai Soe was charged under section 505 of the penal code by the State Administration Council. They also announced that they are preparing to charge him under section 122 of the penal code for treason, for which the maximum penalty is death.
