= Natogyi Township =

- Township
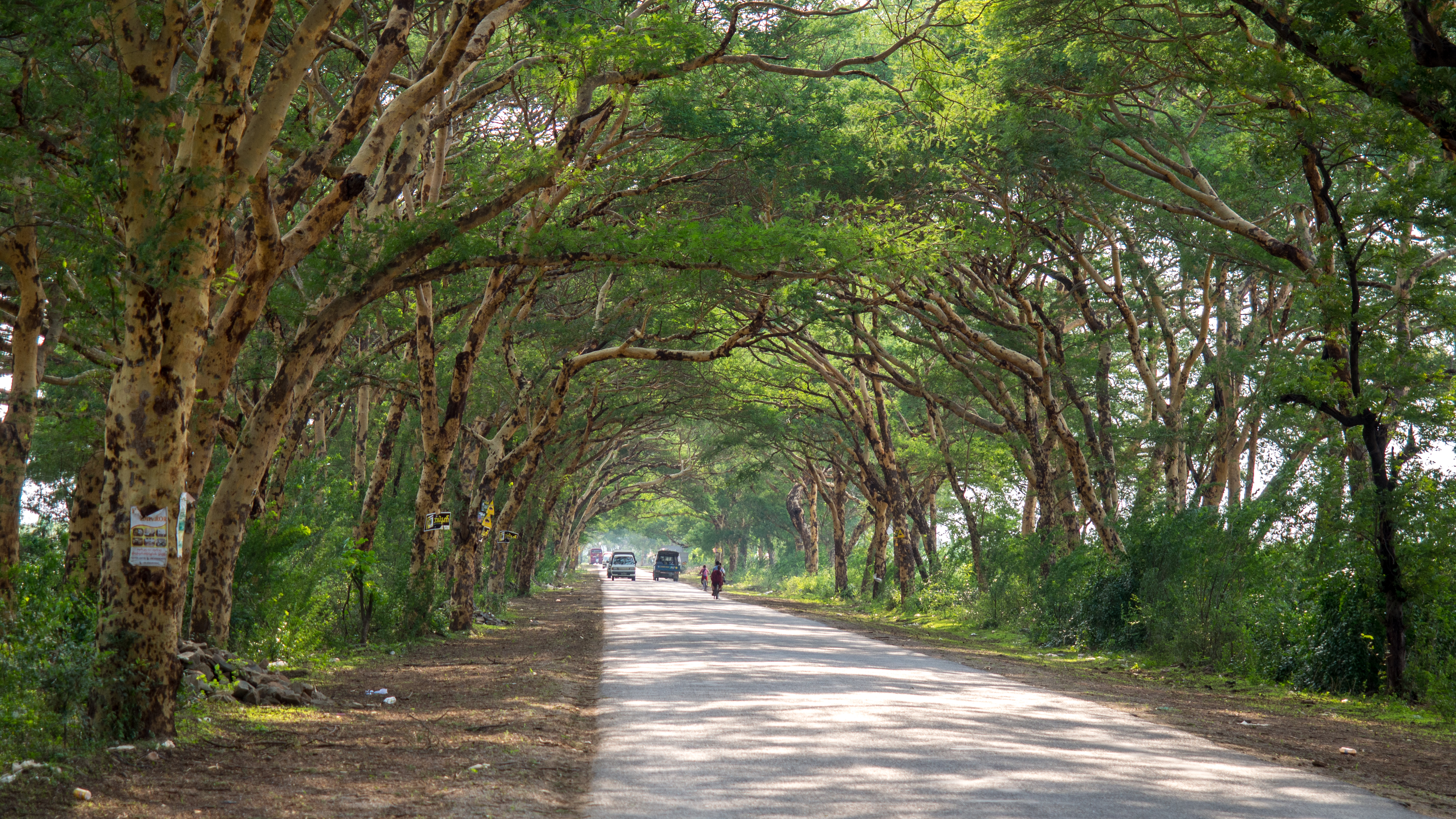
- Myingyan-Mandalay road within Natogyi Township

- Location in Myingyan district

- Location within Myanmar
- Coordinates: 21°25′N 95°39′E
- Country: Burma
- Division: Mandalay Division
- District: Myingyan District
- Capital: Natogyi

Area
  - Total: 481.2 sq mi (1,246 km^{2})

Population (2014)
  - Total: 196,874
  - Density: 409.1/sq mi (158.0/km^{2})
- Time zone: UTC+6:30 (MMT)

Natogyi (Burmese: နွားထိုးကြီး) is a township of Myingyan District in the Mandalay Division of Burma. The township covers an area of 481.2 square miles (1,246 km^{2}) and as of 2014 it had a population of 196,874 people. In the Myanmar year 763 (1401/02) the settlement was referred to as "Nwa_Dho" (Burmese: နွားဓိုရ်), derived from nwa (cow) and dho (herd).

== Geography and climate ==
Natogyi Township is bordered by Myittha Township to the east, Myingyan Township to the west, Ngazon Township to the north and Taungtha Township, Mahlaing Township and Wundwin Township to the south. The area of the township is 481.2 sq miles, 307968 in acres. It is long 30 miles and 3 furlongs from east to west and wide 22 miles and 2 furlongs from north to south. The township is located in the middle dry zone of the country and the average temperature of the township is 41 °C highest and 36.1 °C lowest. The raining days per year is 32 to 55 days and the rainfall is 21 to 43 inches.

=== Villages ===
Myingyan Township contains 193 villages. A proportion of them are listed below:

Aungbangon, Bahet, Bingyidaw, Bugaing, Buthigyin, Dahat, Daingle, Daungbo, Daungu, Daungu, Gwebintha, Gwegon, Hinyangan, Hlezadun, Hnawgan, Ingyaung, Kangyi, Kanna, Kanna, Kan-u, Kanywa, Kanywa, Kanzatkon, Ketlan, Kinmagyibin, Kokkozi, Kontha, Kugon, Kunon, Kyabwa, Kyadwin, Kyagan, Kyaungnan, Kyigan, Kyigyi, Kyundaung, Lanlegwa, Letpan, Letpanbin, Letwe, Leywazon, Leywazon, Londaw, Magyigan, Magyigon, Male, Mannaingtha, Mogan, Myawadi, Myetshu, Myinni, Myogon, Nabemyit, Nabudaw, Nabudaw North, Nabudaw South, Nanwindawbo, Natogyi, Naywedaw, Ngapyawaing, Ngasigyi, Nyaungbingon, Nyaungbintha, Nyaungbinzauk, Nyaunggon, Nyaungok, Nyaungzin, Obondaw, Okshitkon, Oktwin, Padainggon, Padaung, Palangon, Paukpingyauk, Paungyin, Payagyi, Pegyet, Pegyigin, Petku, Pya, Pyawbwe, Pyayagyaung, Pyinhladaw, Pyinzi, Sadaung, Sagyangon, Salechetkon, Sedaw, Sedo, Segale, Segingyi, Seinbangan, Seinbangyin, Shawbyu, Shawbyu, Shwepyiyin, Sindiywa, Subyugan, Subyugon, Tabe, Tada-u, Tanaungbinle, Tanbindaw, Tandaw, Tandawma, Tandawzu, Tangwa, Tawwa, Tawzauk, Tazauk, Tazin, Tazo, Teinbala, Tetsi, Thama, Thamangan, Thaminbe, Thanbinhla, Thapandaw, Thayagon, Thayetkaungbin, Thazi, Thedaw, Thedawgan, Thegyun, Thondaung, Wetlu, Wunthagon, Yele, Yewun, Yobya, Yobya, Yonbingan, Yonyindaw, Ywagyi, Ywatha, Ywathit, Ywathit, Ywathit, Zedeik, Zi, Zidaw, Zigon.
