= Natogyi =

Natogyi နွားထိုးကြီး
- Town
- Location in Burma
- Coordinates: 21°25′N 95°39′E
- Country: Myanmar
- Region: Mandalay
- District: Myingyan District
- Township: Natogyi Township

Population
  - Estimate: 250,000
  - Religions: Buddhism
- Time zone: UTC+6.30 (MST)

Natogyi is a town and seat of Natogyi Township in the Mandalay Region of central Myanmar.

The People's Defense Force briefly took control of the town following clashes in August 2024, before being forced out.
