= Myingyan District =

Coordinates: 21°15′N 95°15′E

Myingyan District is a district of the Mandalay Region in central Myanmar.

Location in Mandalay region

== Townships ==
The district contains the following townships:

- Myingyan Township
- Taungtha Township
- Natogyi Township

At one point, Myingyan District also included Kyaukpadaung Township, until it was annexed into Nyaung-U District (with Nyaung-U Township) in 2014. Prior to 2022, the district included Nganzun Township. In April 2022, Nganzun was split off to join the new Tada-U District in 2022.

== Towns ==
Myingdan District includes the following towns:

- Myingyan (capital)
- Myotha
- Natogyi
- Popaywa
- Pyinzi
- Sadaung, Natogyi Township
- Taungtha
- Wetlu (Watlu)
