= Television in Myanmar =

Television broadcasting in Myanmar began in 1979 as a test trial in Yangon. The first television service BBS was launched on 3 June 1980, followed by regular service in 1981. Most television networks in the country are broadcast from Yangon. MRTV and MWD are the two Burmese state-owned television networks, providing Burmese-language programming in news and entertainment. Other channels include MRTV Entertainment, M Channel, MRTV-4, Channel 7, 5Plus, MNTV, Channel 9, Mizzima TV, DVB TV, Channel K, YTV, Fortune TV, Mahar HD, HEY Play Sports Channel, Uni TV, SNDSY Entertainment, Channel 24, Noble Star TV, Golden Land Channel, Channel B, Kalay TV and more than 20 TV channels. Pay TV services include SKYNET, Myansat and CANAL+ Myanmar.

== History ==
- 1980
  - 3 June - The Burma Broadcasting Service is introduced Burma's first ever Television service. On air identity as Burma Television Programme test trIal broadcast commenced. It's was only air at Tuesday, Thursday and Saturday evening at 7:30pm to 9pm.
  - 1 November - Full time colour broadcast commenced. using NTSC colour encoding standard.
- 1981
  - 1 November - Regular programming schedule was introduced. broadcast hours also expand. opening at 7pm. close at 10:30pm.
- 1983
  - 6 November - Weekend daytime schedule was introduced. It was broadcast from 6am to 3pm every Sunday. On top of the usual evening schedule.
- 1986
  - 3 November - Regular lunchtime schedule was introduced. It was broadcast from 12pm to 2pm. On top of the usual evening schedule.
- 1988
  - 8 December - After 8888 Uprising follow by the subsequent coup d'état, The State Law and Order Restoration Council embarrassing Market-oriented economy. Because of the government policy change, Burma Television started accepting commercial advertising.
- 1993
  - 15 February - Regular Morning schedule was introduced It was broadcast from 7am to 10am. Evening schedule was also expand. Opening at 6pm, Close at 11pm. However, 2 hours lunchtime schedule was ended.
- 1995
  - 15 February - Myanmar Television evening schedule was expand. opening at 5pm, close at 11pm.
  - 27 March - Myanmar's second television channel Myawaddy Television was launched. At that time. Myawaddy was only air at Morning, opening at 7am, closed at 11am.
- 1996
  - 15 February - Myanmar Television expand it's evening schedule. Opening at 4pm, close at 11pm. (This is the last time Myanmar Television has expanded it's broadcast schedule. Next expansion will occur in April 2013)
  - 15 May - Tatmadaw Cable Television System was launched. It was only available in the Downtown Yangon area, and it was only intended to serve in Government Offices, States Guest House and High end/Luxury Hotels. International channels lineup included from Star TV, Warner Bros. Discovery Asia-Pacific and Gang of Five.
- 1997
  - 22 November - Part of the Government restructuring program, Radio and Television parent is rebrand as Myanmar Radio and Television, and the Television channel is rebrand as MRTV.
- 2001
  - 1 August - Myanmar's third television channel MRTV-3 was launched. it was broadcast entirely on English language to promote Myanmar's good image, culture and tourism.
- 2004
  - 15 May - Myanmar's Fourth television channel MRTV-4 was launched. It was the first privately owned commercial television channel.
- 2005
  - 28 May - DVB TV was launched by the Burmese political opposition groups in abroad. It was Myanmar's first Independent News and Information channel, free from SPDC Censorship and Propaganda. Despite risk of face prosecution, DVB TV is very popular among general public. Because of the Alternative news sources.
- 2006
  - 15 February - Digital channels package called MRTV-4 International was launched by Forever Group. It was Myanmar's first Pay TV provider to serv general public. It's also, Myanmar first television network to use DVB-T Standard for signal distribution.
- 2008
  - 1 May - MRTV and MRTV-4 receive wrong weather report about Cyclone Nargis from Department of Meteorology and Hydrology and broadcast without Double-Check. Because, along with television management and management of Department of Meteorology and Hydrology are Feared of interrupting 2008 Myanmar constitutional referendum. This act will lead to over 100,000 causality.
- 2010
  - 1 October - MWD Digital Test trial is commenced.
  - 15 November - SKY NET DTH was launched. it was Myanmar's first Pay TV provider to achieve Nationwide coverage and Myanmar's first television network to use Direct to Home platform for signal distribution.

== Digital Terrestrial Television ==
Network Name	Owner/Operator	Multiplex	Frequency Channel (Yangon Area Only)	Relay Stations Operatior	Total Relay Stations	Total Channels	Other Info	Note
4 Digital	CANAL+ Myanmar Group	CanalPlus MUX 5	E27 522 MHz	CANAL+ Myanmar Group	2	4 DTV; 3 Radio	–	–
MRTV Multichannels Playout System	Ministry of Information (Myanmar)	MRTV MUX 1	E31 554 MHz	Ministry of Information (Myanmar)	158	19 DTV; 6 Radio	–	–
MRTV Multiplex 2	Ministry of Information (Myanmar)	MRTV MUX 2	E35 586 MHz	Ministry of Information (Myanmar)	3	9 DTV; 0 Radio	–	–
MWD Digital	Myanmar Armed Forces	MWD Digital MUX	E42 642 MHz	Myanmar Armed Forces	30	6 DTV; 2 Radio	–	–

Channel (LCN)	Picture format	EPG Name	Programming	Note
CanalPlus MUX 5
61	1080i 16:9	MRTV-4HD	Main MRTV-4 Programming	
62	1080i 16:9	Channel7 HD	Main Channel 7 Programming	
64	480i 4:3	MAHABAWDI	Mahabawdi Channel Programming	
65	480i 4:3	READERS CHANNEL	Reader's Channel Programming	
A160	Audio only	MANDALAY FM	Main Mandalay FM National Service Programming	
A161	Audio only	PYINSAWADI FM 1	Mandalay FM National Service Programming	
A162	Audio only	PYINSAWADI FM 2	Mandalay FM National Service Programming	
MRTV MUX 1
1	1080i 16:9	MRTV HD	Main MRTV HD Channel Programming	
2	1080i 16:9	MRTV NEWS HD	MRTV News Channel Programing	News & Current affairs Programming
3	1080i 16:9	MRTV HLUTTAW	MRTV Parliament Channel Programming	
4	1080i 16:9	MRTV NRC HD	MRTV NRC Channel Programming	Minorities Service.
5	480i 16:9	MRTV Farmer	MRTV Farmers' Programming	
6	480i 16:9	HEY Play Sports	HEY Play Sports Channel Programming	Commercial service
7	1080i 16:9	MRTV ENTERTAINMENT	MRTV Entertainment Channel Programming	
8	480i 16:9	MITV	MITV Programming	Information, Cultural and Travel Programing in English.
9	480i 16:9	EDU	Myanmar Education Channel Programming	
10	480i 16:9	M Channel	M Channel Programming	Commercial service
11	480i 16:9	MRTV-4	MRTV-4 Programming	Commercial service
12	480i 16:9	Channel-7	Channel 7 Programming	Commercial service
13	480i 16:9	5-Plus	5 Plus Channel Programming	Commercial service
14	480i 16:9	MNTV	MNTV Programming	Commercial service
15	480i 16:9	Channel-9	Channel 9 Programming	Commercial service
16	1080i 16:9	MRTV SPORT	MRTV Sports Channel Programming	
17	480i 4:3	Channel K	Channel K Programming	Commercial service
18	480i 4:3	YTV	YTV Programming	Commercial service
19	480i 16:9	Fortune TV	Fortune TV Programming	Commercial service
A1	Audio only	Myanma Radio	Main Myanmar Radio National Service Programming	
A2	Audio only	Upper Tineyinthar	Myanmar Radio Minorities Programming	
A3	Audio only	Lower Tineyinthar	Myanmar Radio Minorities Programming	
A4	Audio only	Test Radio	Mayu FM Programming	
A5	Audio only	MRI Channel	Myanmar Radio International Programming	
A6	Audio only	Tha Pyay	Myanmar Radio 2nd Programming	
MRTV MUX 2
1	1080i 16:9	Channel 24 HD	Main Channel 24 Programing	
2	1080i 16:9	HEY Play Sport HD	Main HEY Play Sports Channel Programming	
3	1080i 16:9	M CHANNEL HD	Main M Channel Programming	
4	1080i 16:9	CHANNEL K HD	Main Channel K Programming	
5	1080i 16:9	FORUNE TV HD	Main Fortune TV Programming	
6	1080i 16:9	YTV HD	Main YTV Programming	
7	1080i 16:9	5-Plus HD	Main 5 Plus Channel Programming	
8	1080i 16:9	Mahar HD	Main Mahar TV Programming	
9	1080i 16:9	Uni Channel	Main Uni TV Programming	
10	1080i 16:9	SNDSY Channel	Main SNDSY Entertainment Programming	
MWD Digital MUX
1	1080i 16:9	MWD Variety HD	MWD Variety Programming	Presentation and Play Out System are based on Naypyitaw
2	1080i 16:9	Kalay TV HD	Kalay TV (Children's TV) Programming	
3	1080i 16:9	MWD Education Knowledge and Sports HD	MWD Educational and Knowledge and Sports Programming	
4	1080i 16:9	MWD HD	Main Myawaddy TV Programming	Presentation and Play Out System are based on Yangon
5	1080i 16:9	Channel B HD	Channel B Programming	Commercial service
6	1080i 16:9	Golden Land HD	Golden Land channel programming	Commercial service
7	1080i 16:9	Noble Star HD	Noble Star TV programming	Commercial service
A1	Audio only	Thazin	Thazin FM Programming	
A2	Audio only	Star FM	Star FM Programming	

== Television Platforms & Providers ==
Provider Name	Owner	Available Area	Service Type	Platform	Total Channels	Launch date	Defunct date
MRTV Multichannels Playout System	Myanmar Radio and Television	Nationwide	Free-to-Air	Digital terrestrial television	19	15 October 2013	–
MRTV DTH	Myanmar Radio and Television	Nationwide	Free-to-Air	DTH (using Intelsat 39 62°E)	18	1 February 2022	–
MRTV App	Myanmar Radio and Television	Nationwide	Free-to-Air	IPTV (using Twitch servers)	8 Channels with VOD Catalogue	1 August 2023	–
MWD Digital	Myanmar Armed Force	Selected City's and Township	Free-to-Air	Digital terrestrial television	7	1 October 2010	–
Softtech M1 Myanmar	Softtech Company Limited	Nationwide	Free-to-Air	DTH (using Thaicom 6 78.5°E and Apstar 7 76.5°E)	19	28 August 2026	–
PSI Satellite Myanmar	PSI Company Limited	Nationwide	Free-to-Air	DTH (using Thaicom 6 78.5°E and Intelsat 39 62°E)	between 10 and 60	28 August 2026	–
CANAL+ DTH	CANAL+ Myanmar Group	Nationwide	Pay TV	DTH (using Thaicom 6 78.5°E)	61	28 January 2018	–
Myansat DTH	Borderless Media and Telesky Media Group	Nationwide	Pay TV	DTH (using Laosat 1 128.5°E)	130	15 January 2025	–
SKYNET DTH	Shwe Than Lwin Media	Nationwide	Pay TV	DTH (using Apstar 7 76.5°E)	51	15 November 2010	–
CANAL+ DTT	CANAL+ Myanmar Group	Yangon & Mandalay area	Pay TV	Digital terrestrial television	61	28 January 2018	–
NayPyiTaw Cable TV	Naypyitaw City Development Committee	Selected location's in Naypyitaw	Pay TV	Cable TV	20	1 September 2013	–
My CANAL	CANAL+ Myanmar Group	Nationwide	Pay TV	IPTV	59 channels with VOD Catalogue	23 January 2019	–
SKYNET App	Shwe Than Lwin Media	Nationwide	Pay TV	IPTV	7 Channels with VOD Catalogue	15 January 2025	–
TV360 by Mytel	Mytel, Viettel	Nationwide	Pay TV	IPTV	15 Channels with VOD Catalogue	27 May 2025	–
former television providers
Analogue Terrestrial Television	Myanmar Radio and Television, Myanmar Armed Forces, Forever Group	Nationwide	Free-to-Air	Analogue Terrestrial Television	between 2 and 6	3 June 1980	14 February 2024
Myanmar Armed Forces Cable Television	Myanmar Armed Forces	Selected location's in Naypyitaw and Yangon	Pay TV	Analogue Cable Television	20	15 May 1996	31 August 2013
MRTV-4 International / 4TV / 5 Network	Forever Group / Family Entertainment Group	Nationwide	Pay TV	Digital terrestrial television	27	15 February 2006	27 January 2018
Cookie TV	Cookie TV Group	Nationwide	Pay TV	IPTV	57 Channels with VOD Catalogue	10 January 2019	10 May 2021
SKYNET DTT	Shwe Than Lwin Media	Yangon area	Pay TV	Digital terrestrial television	50	1 August 2022	31 October 2024

== Technical Details ==
When Myanmar (Burma) established its first television service, the choice of the Broadcast television systems was an unusual, considering its geography. At that time, most of the neighbouring countries were adopting PAL-B/G system. But, Myanmar (Burma) has chosen NTSC-M system on 6 MHz channel spacing on Pan-American TV frequency as their analogue television standard. The reason Myanmar (Burma) adopted NTSC-M standard is because of the Government of Japan and Matsushita Electric. They are involved during the establishment of Myanmar's first television service and, they are assisting through various methods like Financially, Technologically and Broadcast Expertise. They lobbying to Ministry of Information Burma and Burma Broadcasting Service to adopt NTSC, and the MOI and BBS is agreed. In early 2010s when the Government of Myanmar is working to adopt Digital terrestrial television standard, Myanmar's chose DVB-T2 standard on 8 MHz channel spacing on Western Europe / Asia DTV frequency along with Southeast Asian countries (except Philippines). In terms of technology, DVB-T2 is the most advanced standard and most optimized for multi-channels purposes. Ministry of Information Myanmar and the 'Big Four' television network's MRTV, MWD, SKY NET and CANAL+ Myanmar All are recommend to the government to adopt DVB-T2 standard, and government is agreed their recommendations. Because of the Digital television transition commitment given to the ITU, all NTSC analogue television services in Myanmar ware switched off on 14 February 2024.

Broadcasting Platform	Broadcasting system	Video resolution	Video encoding	Audio encoding	Broadcast spectrum	System Inaugural date	First local broadcast	Final local broadcast
Analogue Terrestrial Television	CCIR System M	525-line 4:3	NTSC	FM	VHF Band I, Band III, UHF Band IV, Band V	1 January 1954	3 June 1980	14 February 2024
Analogue Cable Television, SMATV	CCIR System G	625-line 4:3	PAL	FM, Zweikanalton	UHF 302~870 MHz	25 August 1967	15 May 1996	–
Digital Terrestrial Television	DVB-T	480i 4:3	MPEG-2	MPEG Audio Layer II	UHF Band IV, Band V	15 November 1998	15 February 2006	13 March 2020
Digital Terrestrial Television	DVB-T2	1080i 16:9	H.264	MPEG Audio Layer II, HE AAC	UHF Band IV, Band V	2 December 2009	15 October 2013	–
Satellite Television, Direct to Home	DVB-S2	1080i 16:9	H.264, H.265	AAC, HE AAC	Ku Band	1 September 2006	15 November 2010	–

- 625 line PAL-G was never recognised as the official system by the Government of Myanmar and has never been broadcast on terrestrial network. but many cable providers and SMATV installers are using this system for two reasons. The first resson is, Signal distribution equipment for cable television are imported from Thailand. The Second reason is, Most TVRO International satellite feeds are broadcast with analogue PAL, or digital 576i video mode. Converting to NTSC may result reductions of picture quality. To avoid that, cable providers are simply following video mode used by foreign satellite broadcasters.
- Before adopting DVB-T2, MRTV-4 International, 4TV and MWD Digital used DVB-T system for their multi-channel services. 4TV upgrade to DVB-T2 in 2014 and abandoned DVB-T and MPEG-2 video encoding. MWD Digital did the same in 2020.

== See also ==
- Media of Burma
