= List of television stations in Southeast Asia =

This is a list of television stations in Southeast Asia.

== Brunei ==
Free-to-air television stations included:

- RTB Perdana
- RTB Aneka
- RTB Sukmaindera

== Cambodia ==
Free-to-air television stations include:

- TV3
- TV5 Cambodia
- TVK
- CTV 9
- Apsara TV
- CTN
- Bayon TV
- MYTV
- CNC
- SEA TV
- BTV News
- ETV
- PNN TV
- CTV 8
- Hang Meas HDTV (HMHDTV)
- Raksmey Hang Meas HDTV (RHMHDTV)
- MOI TV
- Sangkem TV (Sangkem TV)

Channels available on cable or satellite include:

- Cambodia News Channel
- CTN International
- Hang Meas TV (HMTV)
- PPCTV Channel 6
- PPCTV Channel 9
- PPCTV Channel 10
- PPCTV Movie 1
- PPCTV Sport
- One TV Karaoke
- One TV Cinema
- One TV Sabay

== East Timor ==
Free-to-air television channels include:

- RTTL
- GMN TV SD/HD
- RTM Maubere
- ETV Timor
- Dhili TV

== Indonesia ==
Free-to-air television networks include:

- Government-owned (through LPP TVRI and DPR RI)
  - TVRI
  - TVRI regional stations (through 35 stations based on 38 provinces in Indonesia)
  - TVRI World
  - TVRI Sport
  - TVR Parlemen
- MNC (through MNC Media, MVN, MNC Channels, Republikorp and iNews Media Group.)
  - MNC Media
    - RCTI
    - MNCTV
    - GTV
  - MVN, etc..
    - Hanacaraka TV
    - Food Travel
    - Entertainment (ENT)
    - Muslim TV
    - Sportstars
    - etc.
  - Republikorp (through iNews Media Group)
    - iNews Media Group
      - iNews
      - Sindonews TV
      - IDX Channel
- Emtek (through Surya Citra Media)
  - SCTV
  - Indosiar
  - Mentari TV (ownership through Indonesia Entertainment Group)
- Emtek (independent-only)
  - Moji
- Bakrie Group (through Visi Media Asia)
  - ANTV (ownership through Intermedia Capital)
  - tvOne
  - VTV (exclusively via ANTV / tvOne multiplexing on terrestrial broadcasts)
- Media Group
  - Metro TV
  - Magna Channel (exclusively via Metro TV multiplexing on terrestrial broadcasts, but some are overwritten by other channels in each region)
  - BN Channel (exclusively via Metro TV multiplexing on terrestrial broadcasts, but some are overwritten by other channels in each region)
- CT Corp (through Trans Media)
  - Trans TV
  - Trans7
  - CNN Indonesia (license from Skydance, exclusively via Trans TV / Trans7 multiplexing on terrestrial broadcasts)
  - CNBC Indonesia (license from Versant, exclusively via Trans TV / Trans7 multiplexing on terrestrial broadcasts)
- Kompas Gramedia (through KG Media)
  - Kompas TV
- Rajawali Corpora
  - RTV
- NT Corp
  - Nusantara TV
- B Universe
  - BTV
- PT Digdaya Media Nusantara
  - Garuda TV
- MD Entertainment (through MDTV Media Technologies)
  - MDTV
- Sin Po Media
  - Sin Po TV

Television station groups

- Jawa Pos Group
  - JTV (covering East Java)
  - Jawa Pos Multimedia
  - Jawa Pos TV (covering Java (especially in Jakarta, Magelang and Cianjur))
- Yayasan Buddha Tzu Chi Indonesia
  - DAAI TV (covering Jakarta and Medan)
- Bali Post Media Group
  - Indonesia Network
    - Bali TV (covering Bali)
- Muhammadiyah
  - tvMu (covering Jakarta, Yogyakarta, Surakarta and Surabaya)
- STTV
- Fajar Group
  - Fajar National Network
- Disway
  - Disway National Network
- Emtek (through Surya Citra Media)
  - Ajwa TV (ownership through Indonesia Entertainment Group, covering Samarinda, Bandung, and Purwakarta, and broadcast simultaneously on Republika TV, exclusively via SCTV / Indosiar multiplexing on terrestrial broadcasts)
- NT Corp
  - Harum TV (covering Bandar Lampung and Bali, exclusively via Nusantara TV multiplexing on terrestrial broadcasts)
  - Gold TV (covering Bandar Lampung and Bali, exclusively via Nusantara TV multiplexing on terrestrial broadcasts)
  - Bhineka TV (covering Bandar Lampung and Bali, exclusively via Nusantara TV multiplexing on terrestrial broadcasts)
- Kick Andy Foundation
  - Smile TV (covering Jakarta, Yogyakarta, Surakarta, and Bandung)
- CTV
- Stara Media Group
  - Stara TV (covering Majalengka, Sumedang, Cianjur, Malang, Bandung (consists of 2 channels), Cirebon (via Caruban TV), Yogyakarta, Surakarta, Jakarta, Bojonegoro, Lamongan, and Tuban)
- MahakaX
  - Republika TV (covering Jakarta, Bandung, Yogyakarta, and Surakarta, broadcast Ajwa TV simultaneously, exclusively via SCTV / Indosiar multiplexing on terrestrial broadcasts)
- Visi Media Asia
  - Jagantara TV (exclusively via ANTV / tvOne multiplexing on terrestrial broadcasts)

== Laos ==
Free-to-air television channels include:

- Lao National Television (LNTV1, LNTV3)
- Lao Public Security Television (LAO PSTV)
- TV Lao
- LATV
- Luang Prabang TV
- Champasack TV

Channels available on cable or satellite include:

- Lao Star TV
- MV Lao TV
- VTE9 (Vientiane Capital Television)

== Malaysia ==
Free-to-air television channels include:

Radio Televisyen Malaysia networks include:

- RTM TV1
- RTM TV2

Free-to-air digital (Radio Televisyen Malaysia) channels include:

- Berita RTM
- RTM TV Okey
- RTM Sukan+

Other channels in Malaysia (Media Prima) include:

- TV3
- NTV7 (DidikTV KPM)
- 8TV
- TV9

Other channels in Malaysia (Independent) include:

- TV Alhijrah

Free-to-air digital television channels include:

- Hankuk TV
- Bernama TV
- TVS
- SIARA TV

Channels available on Astro:

- Astro AEC
- Astro AOD
- Astro Arena
- Astro Arena Bola
- Astro Aura
- Astro Awani
- Astro Badminton
- Astro Boo
- Astro Ceria
- Astro Citra
- Astro Daebak
- Astro FAM Time
- Astro Football
- Astro Grandstand
- Astro Golf
- Astro Hua Hee Dai
- Astro Oasis
- Astro Premier League
- Astro Prima
- Astro QJ
- Astro Rania
- Astro Ria
- Astro Showcase
- Astro Showtime
- Astro Sports Plus
- Astro Sports UHD
- Astro Stadium
- Astro Tennis
- Astro Thangathirai
- Astro Tutor TV
- Astro Vaanavil
- Astro Vellithirai
- Astro Vinmeen

Channels available on Unifi TV:

- Salam HD
- Sensasi
- Inspirasi
- DEGUP
- SIAR
- Dunia Sinema
- Pesona HD
- Unifi Sports
- Unifi eSports

Channels available on RTMKlik:

- RTM World
- Roll
- Snap
- Apetito
- Lead
- Aura
- Fitrah
- Jr.
- RTM Parlimen Dewan Rakyat
- RTM Parlimen Dewan Negara

Channels available on Tonton:

- Drama Sangat (A television network in channels like TV3, NTV7, 8TV, and lastly TV9.)

Channels available on NJOI:

- Jom Ngaji
- Filem Mantap
- Drama Hebat
- Drama Hotpot
- Lawak Sentral
- Travel & Taste
- Oh My Ceria!

== Myanmar ==
Free-to-air television channels include:

- MRTV
- Myawaddy TV
- MITV (Myanmar International television)
- MRTV Famers
- Mahar Bawdi
- Readers Channel
- MRTV Parliament
- For Edu
- MRTV NRC
- MRTV Sports
- MRTV News
- MRTV Entertainment
- MRTV-4
- MRTV-4 HD
- Channel-7 (Myanmar)
- Channel-7 HD (Myanmar)
- DVB (Democratic Voice of Burma)
- Mizzima TV
- Channel K
- YTV
- Fortune TV

Channels available on cable or satellite include:

- MRTV
- DVB (Democratic Voice of Burma)
- MITV (Myanmar International television)
- MRTV-4
- MRTV-4 HD
- Channel-7 (Myanmar)
- Channel-7 HD (Myanmar)
- M Entertainment
- Canal+
- SKY NET

== Philippines ==
Regional, provincial or local

Currently, there are two (3) major TV networks in the Philippines, and three government-owned networks.

Major television networks

- ABS-CBN Corporation (currently airs through A2Z and ALLTV2)
- GMA Network
- TV5

Pre-Major television networks

- ZOE Broadcasting Network (currently airs A2Z)
- Advanced Media Broadcasting System (currently airs ALLTV2)
- GTV (formerly Citynet 27, EMC, Channel V Philippines, QTV/GMA News TV)
- RPTV

Government-owned television networks

- People's Television Network (PTV) (flagship state broadcaster)
- Radio Philippines Network (RPN) (20% minority share (who after ending 100% majority share in 2011); currently carries RPTV)
- Intercontinental Broadcasting Corporation (IBC) (100% majority share)

Minor television networks

- BEAM TV
- RJTV
- Net 25
- UNTV
- All TV
- Aliw Channel 23

Free-to-air digital television channels:

- Bilyonaryo News Channel
- Blast Sports
- Congress TV
- D8TV
- Heart of Asia
- I Heart Movies
- Knowledge Channel
- Life TV
- One Sports
- Prime TV

Channels available on cable and satellite include:

- ANC
- Cine Mo!
- Cinema One
- DZMM TeleRadyo
- DZRH TV
- Jeepney TV
- Kapamilya Channel
- Kapatid Channel
- Living Asia Channel
- Metro Channel
- Myx
- NBA TV Philippines
- One News
- One PH
- One Sports+
- PBA Rush
- PBO
- Pinoy Xtreme
- Premier Sports
- Solar Sports
- TAP Action Flix
- TAP Edge
- TAP Movies
- TAP Sports
- TAP TV
- UAAP Varsity Channel
- Viva Cinema

== Singapore ==
- Mediacorp 5
- Mediacorp 8
- Mediacorp U
- Mediacorp Suria
- Mediacorp Vasantham
- CNA

Channels available on cable and satellite, also across Southeast Asia, include:

- Animal Planet
- Animax
- Aniplus
- AXN
- Asian Food Network
- beIN Sports
- Cartoon Network
  - Cartoon Network Philippines (Philippine SDTV feed)
- Cartoonito
- Cinemax
- CNBC
- Crime + Investigation
- Discovery Asia
- Discovery Channel
- Discovery Science
- DMAX
- Food Network
- HBO
- HBO Family
- HBO Hits
- HBO Signature
- History
- HITS
- K-Plus
- Lifetime
- Nick Jr.
- Nickelodeon
- Rock Action
- Rock Entertainment
- SPOTV
- TechStorm
- TLC
- Warner TV

=== National and International Channels ===
- CNN International
- CNA
- BBC News
- France 24
- DW
- Bloomberg
- CGTN
- TRT World
- CBeebies
- ABC Australia
- Al Jazeera
- Eurosport

== Thailand ==
Free-to-air television stations include:

- Channel 3 HD (digital TV station owned by BEC-Multimedia since 2014)
- RTA5 HD
- Channel 7 HD
- 9MCOT HD
- NBT
- Thai PBS (formerly ITV and TITV)

Digital Free-to-air television stations include:

- TNN 16
- Nation TV
- Workpoint TV
- True4U
- GMM 25
- Channel 8
- MONOMAX Sports
- One 31
- Thairath TV
- Amarin TV
- PPTV
- T Sports 7
- TPTV

Channels available on cable or satellite include:

- DLTV 1-15
- ETV
- TRUTH TV 75
- Police TV
- Lanthung TV
- White Channel
- Yateem TV
- Huk Mor Lam TV
- Oto Shopping
- MVMall
- Thai Chaiyo
- UMM TV
- Annas TV
- New TM
- STOU Channel
- Suwannabhumi Channel
- People TV
- Boom 89
- Top News
- France 24 English

Channels available on TrueVisions include:

- True Film 1
- True Film 2
- True Film Asia
- True Thai Film
- True Asian More
- True Plook Panya
- True Series
- True Movie Hits
- True iQIYI
- Foodiez Channel
- True Explore Wild
- True Explore Sci
- Rama Channel
- True Sports
- True Premier Football
- True Tennis
- True Spark Play
- True Soul Siam
- True X-Zyte

Other channels run by True Visions include:

- TNN 16
- TNN 2

Channels run by the MONO Next include:

- MONO29 Plus
- MONO29 Music Station
- Asian Hits
- MONO Max

International Channels include:

- ABC Australia
- Asian Food Network
- Al Jazeera
- Animal Planet
- AXN
- Arirang TV
- BBC News
- BBC Earth
- BBC Lifestyle
- beIN Sports
- Bloomberg
- CNN International
- CNA
- CCTV 4
- CGTN
- CNBC
- CBeebies
- Cinemax
- Cartoon Network
- Cartoonito
- Crime Investigation
- DW
- DMAX
- DreamWorks
- Discovery Channel
- Discovery Asia
- Discovery Science
- Fashion TV
- Food Network
- HGTV
- History
- HBO
- HBO Family
- HBO Hits
- HBO Signature
- NHK World Japan
- Lifetime
- Nickelodeon
- Nick Jr.
- Outdoor Channel
- SPOTV
- TRT World
- TV5Monde
- TLC
- tvN
- Vietnam Today
- Warner TV
- Zoomoo

== Vietnam ==
- VTV – National public broadcaster, operates ten channels and dozen Pay TV channels network:
  - VTV1 - News and current affairs
  - VTV2 - Education, Science and Sports
  - VTV3 - Sports and Entertainment
  - VTV4 - International Channel
  - VTV5 - Ethnic language (and VTV5 Southwest, VTV5 Central Highland)
  - VTV6 - Sports
  - VTV7 - Education and Children
  - VTV8 - Da Nang Region
  - VTV9 - Southeast Region
  - VTV10 - Southwest Region
  - Vietnam Today - English-language International Channel
- VTVcab – The national cable television network, operated by VTV. It has 23 thematic channels.
  - ON Vie Giai Tri - General entertainment
  - ON Phim Viet - Vietnamese movies
  - ON Movies - Foreign movies and entertainment program
  - ON E Channel - General entertainment
  - ON Cine - Foreign dramas
  - ON Bibi, ON Kids - Channel for children
  - ON Info TV - Financial information and entertainment program
  - ON O2TV - Channel for health
  - ON Home Shopping - Shopping channel
  - ON Style TV - Lifestyle channel
  - ON Music - Music channel
  - ON Trending TV - Channel for youth
  - ON Biz - General entertainment
  - ON V Family - General entertainment
  - ON Vie Dramas - Asian dramas
  - ON Life - Life and explore
  - HTV5 (Bchannel) - Buddhism culture
  - ON Sports network: ON Sports, ON Sports+, ON Football, ON Sports News, ON Golf
- SCTV – Saigontourist Cable Television, a joint venture of VTV and Saigontourist company. The first cable television network in Vietnam.
  - SCTV General Movies - Asian dramas
  - SCTV1 - Comedy
  - SCTV2 (Today TV), SCTV11, SCTV18 - General entertainment
  - SCTV3 (See TV), SCTV19 (Channel T) - Channel for children
  - SCTV4 - General information and entertainment
  - SCTV5 (SCJ Life On), SCTV10 - Shopping
  - SCTV6 (Fim 360) - Movies and entertainment
  - SCTV7 - Arts
  - SCTV8 (VITV) - Financial news
  - SCTV9 - Asian series (mainly from Hong Kong's TVB)
  - SCTV12 - Travel and discover
  - SCTV13 - Channel for woman
  - SCTV14 (Vietnamese Movies Channel) - Vietnamese movies
  - SCTV16 - Foreign film
  - SCTV20 - Music
  - SCTV21 (Vietnamese Memories) - General entertainment
  - SCTV's sports network: SCTV15 (S Sport 2), SCTV17 (S Sport), SCTV22 (S Sport 1)
  - SCTV4K - High definition 4K
- ANTV (People's Police Television) - Police and security channel
- QPVN (Vietnam National Defence Television) - National defense and military channel
- Ho Chi Minh City TV – The first TV station in Vietnam, includes 9 free-to-air channels:
  - HTV7 (HD/SD) - Entertainment and Sports
  - HTV9 (HD/SD) - News, Entertainment and Sports
  - HTV1 - Information
  - HTV2 (Vie Channel) - Entertainment
  - HTV3 - General entertainment
  - HTV4 - Education
  - HTV5 (Bchannel) - Buddhism culture
  - HTV Thể Thao - Sports
  - HTV co.op - Shopping
  - HTVC – Ho Chi Minh City Cable Television - 7 pay channels (HTVC Thuan Viet, HTVC Gia Dinh, HTVC Phu Nu, HTVC Phim, HTVC Ca Nhac, HTVC Du Lich Va Cuoc Song and HTVC+)
- TV360 Cuu Long - General entertainment
- 62 provincial television stations

=== International Channels ===
- ABC Australia - General
- Asian Food Network - Food and Lifestyle
- Animal Planet - Documentary
- Arirang TV - General
- AXN - Entertainment
- BBC News - News
- BBC Earth - Documentary
- BBC Lifestyle - Lifestyle
- Bloomberg - Financial news
- CNA - News
- Cartoon Network - Kids
- Cartoonito - Kids
- CNN International - News
- Cinemax - Movies
- CinemaWorld - Movie
- Discovery Channel - Documentary
- Discovery Asia - Documentary
- DW - News
- DMAX - Lifestyle
- DreamWorks - Kids
- Da Vinci Kids - Educational
- France 24 - News
- Fashion TV - Lifestyle
- HBO - Movies
- HGTV - Lifestyle
- History - Documentary
- KBS World - General
- NHK World Japan - General
- Outdoor Channel - Lifestyle
- SPOTV, SPOTV2 - Sports Channel
- TLC - Lifestyle
- TV5Monde - General
- Warner TV - Movies and series
- BOX Channel - Box Movie 1, Box Hits, In The Box, MAN, WOMAN, Music Box, Dr Fit., Planet Earth, Happy Kids, ON Kids.

== Defunct channels ==
=== Indonesia ===
- MVN defunct channels include:
  - MNC Channel (replaced by OK TV, which got replaced again with Food Travel).
  - Auto&Gadget (Disappeared without a clear reason)
  - MNC Shop (following with MNC News, which rebranded to the former Sindo TV, but this channel doesn't have a descendant so it disappeared ^{(not accurate)})
  - Waku-Waku Japan (ownership through Japan Endless Discovery)
- Astro Nusantara – a joint venture of Lippo Group and Astro Malaysia Holdings (Malaysia). It has 10 premium channels:
  - Astro Aruna
  - Astro Awani
  - Astro Ceria
  - Astro Kirana
  - Astro Oasis
  - Astro Shuang Xing
  - Astro SuperSport
  - Astro TVIQ
  - Astro Wah Lai Toi
  - Astro Xpresi
- Independent channels include:
  - ADiTV (Muhammadiyah, Yogyakarta)
  - INTV
  - Banten TV
  - MYTV

=== Malaysia ===
- Mega TV - Cable television service
- RTM defunct channel include:
  - RTM TV6
- Astro defunct channels include:
  - Astro Kirana
  - Astro SuperSport
  - Astro TVIQ
  - Astro Wah Lai Toi
- Independent channels include:
  - SUKE TV
  - Enjoy TV5
  - Awesome TV

=== Singapore ===
- Mediacorp Okto (Discontinued in 2023, but still a program show by Mediacorp 5 and Mediacorp 8.)

=== Thailand ===
- Thai PBS defunct channels include:
  - ALTV
- BEC World defunct channels include:
  - Channel 3 SD
  - Channel 3 Family
- MCOT defunct channels include:
  - MCOT Family
- JKN Global Group defunct channels include:
  - Channel 18
  - JKN-CNBC
  - JKN Dramax
- TrueVisions defunct channels include:
  - True Chinese More
  - True Korean More
  - True Spark Jump
  - True Inside
  - True Music
  - True Series
- Independent channels include:
  - Loca
  - Thai TV 17
  - Spring News 19
  - Bright TV 20
  - Voice TV 21
  - Spring 26

=== Vietnam ===
==== Former Channels ====
- K+ (Vietnam Digital Satellite TV) – a joint venture of VTV and Canal+ (France). It has 5 premium channels:
  - K+ Cine - Movies
  - K+ Action - Entertainment
  - K+ Kids - Channel for kids
  - K+ Sport 1, K+ Sport 2 - Sports channel
- VTC – National digital broadcaster, the first digital-only station in Vietnam:
  - VTC1 - News - Politics - Generalist
  - VTC2 - Science - Technology & Lifestyle
  - VTC3 - Culture - Sports - Entertainment
  - VTC4 - Fashion & Lifestyle
  - VTC5 - Entertainment channel
  - VTC6 - Information - Entertainment channel for the Northern Region
  - VTC7 - Entertainment channel
  - VTC8 - Information - Entertainment channel for the Southern region
  - VTC9 - Information - Entertainment channel
  - VTC10 - Vietnamese Culture
  - VTC11 - Channel for children
  - VTC12 - Entertainment channel
  - VTC13 - Music channel
  - VTC14 - Weather - Environment & Information channel
  - VTC16 - Agriculture channel
- VOV TV (Voice of Vietnam) - Culture & Tourism channel
- Quốc Hội TV (National Assembly Television) - Parliament channel
- VNews (Vietnam News Agency) - News channel
- Nhân Dân TV (Nhân Dân Television) - Generalist channel

==== Former International Channels ====
- Animax - Anime
- CCTV-9 - General
- Fox Movies - Movies
- Fox Family Movies - Movies for Family
- Fox - Entertainment
- Fox Life - Entertainment
- FX - Entertainment
- TCM - Movies
- MGM - Movies
- Central Movies - Movies
- BabyTV - Kids
- BabyFirst - Kids
- Toonami - Kids
- National Geographic - Documentary
- Nat Geo Wild - Documentary
- CNBC - Financial news
- Disney Channel - Kids
- Disney Junior - Kids
- Kix - Entertainment
- HITS - Movies
- GEM TV - Entertainment
- Red by HBO - Movies
- Fox Sports - Sports
- Fox Sports 2 - Sports
- Fox Sports 3 - Sports
- Channel V - Music
- Paramount Channel - Movies and series

== See also ==
- Lists of television channels
- List of television stations in East Asia
- List of television stations in South Asia
- List of television stations in Central Asia
- List of television stations in West Asia
