= MRTV (TV network) =

Burmese television channel

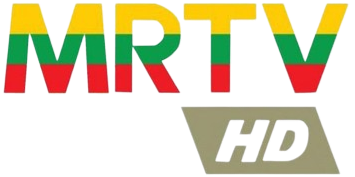
- Country: Myanmar
- Broadcast area: Myanmar; Thailand; Laos; Cambodia
- Headquarters: Tatkon, Naypyidaw

Programming
- Language: Burmese
- Picture format: 1080i HDTV (downscaled to 480i for the SD feed)

Ownership
- Owner: Myanmar Radio and Television
- Sister channels: MRTV News; MRTV Parliament; MRTV NRC; MRTV Farmers; MRTV Sports; MRTV Entertainment; MITV

History
- Launched: 3 June 1980; 46 years ago (Analogue NTSC-M); 15 October 2013; 13 years ago (Digital DVB-T2)
- Former names: Burma Television (3 June 1980 – 17 June 1989); Myanmar Television (18 June 1989 – 21 November 1997)

Links
- Website: www.mrtv.gov.mm

Availability

Terrestrial
- MRTV (Myanmar): Channel 1 (HD); RF Channel 31 554 MHz
- Thaicom 6 (Thailand): 3730 H 15000 (SD)
- Intelsat 39: 11137 V 30000 (HD)
- Sky Net (Myanmar): Channel 2 (HD)
- CANAL+ (Myanmar): Channel 25 (HD)
- Softtech M1 (Myanmar): Channel 1 (HD)
- GMM Z (Thailand): Channel 201 (HD)
- Infosat (Thailand): Channel 101 (HD)

Streaming media
- MRTV App: Channel 1 SD/HD (App); Watch Live (Web)

MRTV is a television network owned by Myanmar Radio and Television. It was launched on 3 June 1980 and is the first television network in Myanmar.

== History ==
First considered as far back as the early 1970s, television service in Myanmar was first introduced in June 1979 as a test trial in Yangon following an agreement between Japan's Matsushita Electric and Burma's Heavy Industries Corp. for the production of television sets. MRTV (at the time Burma Television) was first launched on 3 June 1980, from Yangon on VHF channel 6, using a 10 KW transmitter broadcasting to a 70 km radius, with broadcasts in colour (some sources erroneously say that MRTV started as a monochrome service) beginning 1 November. Regular television service was formally launched in 1981 using the NTSC standard. The station was built with assistance from the Japanese government and there were plans to extend its signal nationwide by the end of the decade. The service was also available in Mandalay from the beginning.

Burma Television started accepting commercial advertising in 1988. That same year, it reached 53.95% of the national population, rising to 82.45% after 1990. Until the founding of Myawaddy Television by the Ministry of Defense in 1995, it was the only television channel in the country.

In 2005, MRTV had 195 television relay stations throughout the country.

In October 2013, MRTV started broadcasting on digital terrestrial with DVB-T2 System, same as most ASEAN Countries. 18 TV channels and 5 Myanmar Radio channels are on MRTV multiplex system. MRTV plans the news interface, to the modern style of starting sequences and will have well-decorated news room. The broadcasting hours also increased to 18 hours (previously 10 hours).
On February 15, 2015, MRTV adding 5 new TV channels to their Multplex Play Out system, such as MRTV-4, Channel 7, 5 Plus, MNTV and Channel 9.

On March 24, 2018, MRTV added 5 new TV channels to their Multiplex Play out System, such as Mizzima TV, DVB TV, Channel K, YTV and Fortune TV.

On January 16, 2024, MRTV updated its in-house channels and free-to-air channels into High Definition (HD) and added 5 new TV channel to their MRTV DTH System, such as Mahar HD, Mahar Esports HD, Uni Channel HD, SNDSY Channel HD and Channel 24 HD.

== Programming ==
Program's broadcast on Main MRTV HD Channel.

Year	English name	Original Name (Burmese)	Cast
2015	The Sun, The Moon and The Truth	နေရယ် လရယ် အမှန်တရားရယ်	Moe Yan Zun, Su Pan Htwar, Phone Thike, Nay Yan, Khin Zarchi Kyaw,
2018	Battle of Two Flowers	ပန်းနှစ်ပွင့်စီးချင်း	Paing Phyo Thu, May Barani Thaw,
2018	Kyamar Noon	ကြမ္မာနွံ	Min Oo, Yan Kyaw, Su Hlaing Hnin, May Thinzar Oo, Pho Thauk Kyar, Aung Khant Zaw, Mya Hnin Yee Lwin, Soe Nandar Kyaw, Aung Khine, Khin Moht Moht Aye,
2018	Beautiful Wives Club	ဇနီးချောများကွန်ရက်	Soe Pyae Thazin, Mya Hnin Yee Lwin, May Barani Thaw, Khin Thazin,
2018	Hospital Diary	ဆေးရုံမှတ်တမ်း	Aung Myint Myat, Swan Htet, Myat Thu Aung, Thura Htoo, Nwe Darli Tun, Khin Thazin, Gon Yi Aye Kyaw,

Local Programming
8PM Local News	since 1980
7AM MRTV Breakfast News	since 2013
4PM Regional News	since 2024
English National News	since 2021
English Breakfast Shows	1993-2001
Soccer View	since 2015
Weekly Sports Info	since 2015
So Gya Mal, Praw Gya Mal	1995–2016
Family Quiz	since 2020
Cute Children's Games	since 1997
Thu Tha Sone Lin Shwe Yone Shin	1997-2000
Friday Night Live Show	since 2020
Saturday Night Comedy Show	since 2021
Saturday Night Opera	since 2022
Imports
Horizon (Series 17-27)	1982-1995
The Tonight Show Starring Johnny Carson	1985
Life on Earth	1986
Cosmos: A Personal Voyage	1987
Telematch	1988
The Magic of David Copperfield	1989
The Living Planet	1990
The Day the Universe Changed	1991
Nova (Seasons 7-17)	1991-1994
Galileo	2008-2012
Hawaii Five-O	1982
Charlie's Angels	1983
Little House on the Prairie	1984
The Six Million Dollar Man	1985
Love Boat	1986
Star Trek	1987
Knight Rider	1988
Automan	1989
Street Hawk	1989
The A-Team	1989
Airwolf	1990
Journey to the West	1991
I Dream of Jeannie	1992
Bewitched	1993
Oshin	1994
The Equalizer	1995
Full House	1995–1996
Mr. Bean	1996
MacGyver	1997
The Young Indiana Jones Chronicles	1998
Fortune Hunter	1999
Inspector Rex	2000
Monk	2013
Prison Break	2014
CSI: NY	2015
Dream of the Red Chamber (HD Remaster)	2019–2020
Supernatural	2019
The Flash	2020
Grimm	2020
The Assassination of Gianni Versace: American Crime Story	2021
Heroes	2021
Hudson & Rex	2021
Queen of the South	2022
Agent of Shield	2023
Friends	2024
Gotham	2025

== Digital terrestrial television ==
Channel	Picture format	EPG name	Programming	Note
MRTV MUX 1
1	1080i 16:9	MRTV HD	Main MRTV HD Channel Programming	
2	1080i 16:9	MRTV NEWS HD	MRTV News Channel Programing	News & Current affairs Programming
3	1080i 16:9	MRTV HLUTTAW	MRTV Parliament Channel Programming	
4	1080i 16:9	MRTV NRC HD	MRTV NRC Channel Programming	Minorities Service.
5	480i 16:9	MRTV Farmers	MRTV Farmers' Programming	
6	480i 16:9	HEY Play Sports	HEY Play Sports Channel Programming	Commercial service
7	1080i 16:9	MRTV ENTERTAINMENT	MRTV Entertainment Channel Programming	
8	480i 16:9	MITV	MITV Programming	Information, Cultural and Travel Programing in English.
9	480i 16:9	EDU	Myanmar Education Channel Programming	
10	480i 16:9	M Channel	M Channel Programming	Commercial service
11	480i 16:9	MRTV-4	MRTV-4 Programming	Commercial service
12	480i 16:9	Channel-7	Channel 7 Programming	Commercial service
13	480i 16:9	5-Plus	5 Plus Channel Programming	Commercial service
14	480i 16:9	MNTV	MNTV Programming	Commercial service
15	480i 16:9	Channel-9	Channel 9 Programming	Commercial service
16	1080i 16:9	MRTV SPORT	MRTV Sports Channel Programming	
17	480i 4:3	Channel K	Channel K Programming	Commercial service
18	480i 4:3	YTV	YTV Programming	Commercial service
19	480i 16:9	Fortune TV	Fortune TV Programming	Commercial service
A1	Audio only	Myanma Radio	Main Myanmar Radio National Service Programming	
A2	Audio only	Upper Tineyinthar	Myanmar Radio Minorities Programming	
A3	Audio only	Lower Tineyinthar	Myanmar Radio Minorities Programming	
A4	Audio only	Test Radio	Mayu FM Programming	
A5	Audio only	MRI Channel	Myanmar Radio International Programming	
A6	Audio only	Tha Pyay	Myanmar Radio 2nd Programming	

Relay Station	Transmitter Site	Frequency Channel (MUX 1)	Transmitter Power (ERP)	Engineering Status
MRTV Headquarters	MRTV Headquarters, Tatkon tws	E21 474 MHz	3KW	
Naypyitaw	Pyinmana tws	E30 546 MHz	3KW	
Yangon	MRTV Broadcast Centre, Pyay rd, Kamayout tws	E31 554 MHz	3KW	Only transmitter site keep transmitters on air for 24 hours.
Mandalay; Sagaing	Mount Sagaing	E30 546 MHz	3KW	
Momywa	Bodhi Ta Htaung	E27 522 MHz	3KW	out of service
Ye U	?	E24 498 MHz	3KW	out of service
Kanbalu	?	E27 522 MHz	1KW	
Homalin	?	E30 546 MHz	300W	
Kyaukpadaung	Mount Popa	E27 522 MHz	3KW	
Pyin Oo Lwin	?	E26 514 MHz	600W	
Meiktila	Near MPT Exchange office, Old Yangon-Mandalay rd,	E30 546 MHz	3KW	
Minbu; Magway	Minbu	E27 522 MHz	3KW	
Pakokku	Near Hsu Gyi Pan Taung & Sāsana Perla Monastery,	E32 562 MHz	3KW	
Taung Dwin Gyi	?	E27 522 MHz	1KW	
Pathein	Ma Nyein Hla Gone ward	E30 546 MHz	3KW	
Kyaunggom	?	E27 522 MHz	3KW	
Bogale	?	E27 522 MHz	3KW	
Labutta	?	E24 498 MHz	3KW	
Bago	near Bago City Hall, Bago City Hall rd.	E30 546 MHz	3KW	
Taungoo	Near NewDay gas station, Old Yangon-Mandalay Rd.	E27 522 MHz	3KW	
Pyay	Near Shwe San Taw Pagoda, Min Gyi Taung,	E26 514 MHz	3KW	
Dawei	?	E27 522 MHz	1KW	
Myeik	?	E27 522 MHz	3KW	
Taunggyi	Near Shwe Bone Pwint Pagoda and View Point	E27 522 MHz	3KW	
Lahio	Near Sāsanar Year 2500 Pagoda	E27 522 MHz	1KW	out of service
Keng Tung (Kyaingtong)	Loi Mwe Hill	E27 522 MHz	300W	
Sittwe	Yangon-Sittwe rd	E27 522 MHz	3KW	out of service
Painetaung (Yanbye Island)	Mount Painetaung, Yanbye tws	E30 546 MHz	3KW	out of service
Toungup	Near No.3 BEHS, Thendwe-Toungup rd,	E27 522 MHz	3KW	out of service
Buthidaung; Maungdaw	near Bawr Buddar Long Tunnel, Mount NgweTaung, Maungdaw tws	E30 546 MHz	1KW	out of service
Mawlamyine	Near Mon State Police Station, Taung Yoe Dan Rd.	E27 522 MHz	3KW	
Belin	?	E29 538 MHz	3KW	
Pa An	Near Hla Ka Nyin Park, Hla Ka Nyin Rd	E30 546 MHz	3KW	
Myitkyina	?	E27 522 MHz	1KW	
Bhamo	Near Bhamo City Hall and Gawya Lake	E27 522 MHz	300W	out of service
Hakka	Mount Rung, Near Microwave station	E21 474 MHz	300W	out of service
Tedim (Tee Tain); Kalay	Kennedy peak	E25 506 MHz	1KW	out of service
Loikaw	?	E24 498 MHz	1KW	

- Relay Stations List on above, include only 38 Main Transmitter Site. there are over 150 relay stations across the country. that serves for the other small towns and rural areas.
- Only Yangon transmitter site broadcast 24 hours. other relay stations usually shutdown their transmitter at 12am (Midnight) to save budget.
- Relay station's mark with RED Colour are out of service until further notice. Due to the ongoing Myanmar Civil War

== Satellite television ==
To reduce relying on the Terrestrial relay stations and compete with unlicensed or opposition satellite TV channels, MRTV launch its own Free to View Direct to Home service called MRTV DTH on February 1, 2022. It offers 19 TV channels, using Intelsat 39 62°E 11137/V/30000 and Thaicom 6 78.5°E 3730/H/15000. Which is some of the beams on those satellite are ranted by Government of Myanmar. All Channels from MRTV DTH system from both satellite are available for free of charge.
However, most of the General Entertainment Channels may use Encryption/Scrambled system to prevent spill over, and reduced risks over Copyrighted Material.

Channel number	Channel name	Channels resolution
62.0°E Channel list
1	MRTV HD	1080i
2	MRTV News HD	1080i
3	MRTV Parliament HD	1080i
4	MRTV NRC HD	1080i
5	MRTV Farmers HD	1080i
6	MRTV Sports HD	1080i
7	MRTV Entertainment HD	1080i
8	MITV	480i
9	Channel K	480i
10	M Channel HD	1080i
11	MWD	480i
12	Mahar HD	1080i
13	Mahar Esports HD	1080i
14	Uni TV HD	1080i
15	SNDSY Entertainment	1080i
16	Education Channel	480i
17	MRTV Entertainment HD (HEVC H.265)	1080i
18	HEY Play Sports HD	1080i
19	Channel 24 HD	1080i
A1	Myanmar Radio	Audio only
A2	Upper Tineyinthar	Audio only
A3	Lower Tineyibthar	Audio only
A4	Mayu FM	Audio only
A5	Myanmar Radio International	Audio only
A6	Tha Pyay Radio	Audio only
78.5°E Channel List
1	MRTV HD	1080i
2	MRTV News HD	1080i
3	MRTV Parliament HD	1080i
4	MRTV NRC HD	1080i
5	MRTV Farmers	480i
6	HEY Play Sports	480i
7	MRTV Entertainment HD	1080i
8	MITV	480i
9	Education Channel	480i
10	M Channel	480i
11	MRTV-4	480i
12	Channel 7	480i
13	5 Plus	480i
14	MNTV	480i
15	Channel 9	480i
16	MRTV Sports HD	1080i
17	Channel K	480i
18	YTV	480i
19	Fortune TV	480i
A1	Myanmar Radio	Audio only
A2	Upper Tineyinthar	Audio only
A3	Lower Tineyibthar	Audio only
A4	Mayu FM	Audio only
A5	Myanmar Radio International	Audio only
A6	Tha Pyay Radio	Audio only

== See also ==
- Myanmar Radio and Television (Parent organisation)
- MITV
- MRTV-4
- MWD
- Television in Myanmar
- Media in Myanmar
