= MRTV News Channel =

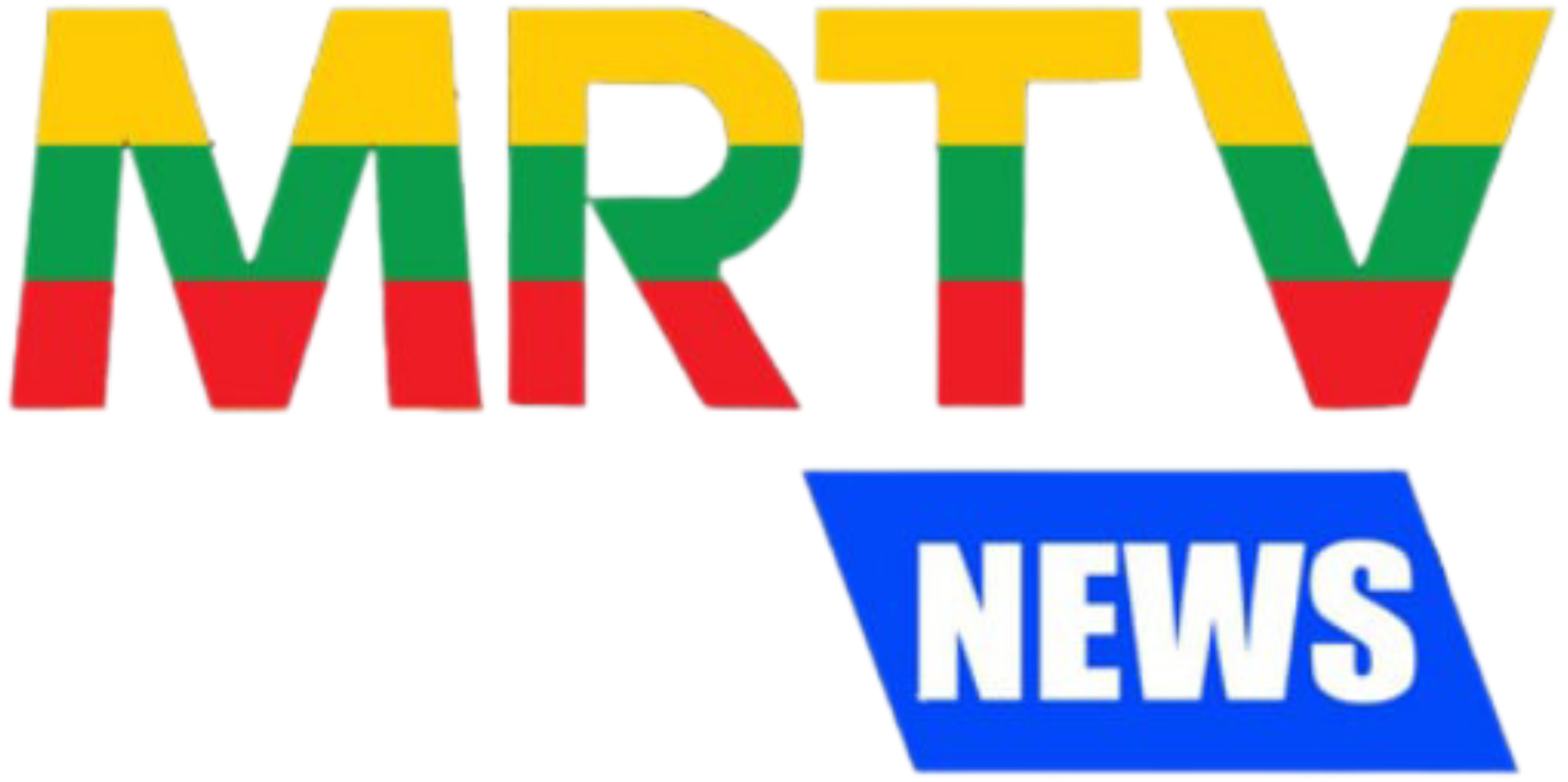
- Logo of MRTV News Channel
- Country: Myanmar
- Broadcast area: Myanmar; International
- Headquarters: Tatkon, Naypyidaw

Programming
- Language: Burmese
- Picture format: 1080i HDTV (downscaled to 480i for the SD feed)

Ownership
- Owner: Myanmar Radio and Television
- Sister channels: MRTV HD; MRTV Parliament; MRTV NRC; MRTV Farmers; MRTV Sports; MRTV Entertainment; MITV

History
- Launched: 1 February 2022; 4 years ago
- Replaced: DVB TV; Mizzima TV

Links
- Website: www.mrtv.gov.mm

Availability

Terrestrial
- MRTV (Myanmar): Channel 2 (HD); RF Channel 31 554 MHz
- Thaicom 6 (Thailand): 3730 H 15000 (HD)
- Intelsat 39: 11137 V 30000 (HD)
- Apstar 7: 10973 V 24500 (HD)
- CANAL+ (Myanmar): Channel 2 (HD)
- Softtech M1 (Myanmar): Channel 2 (HD)
- GMM Z (Thailand): Channel 202 (HD)
- Infosat (Thailand): Channel 102 (HD)

Streaming media
- MRTV App: Channel 2 SD/HD

MRTV News Channel is a dedicated news channel, owned and operate by Myanmar Radio and Television. It broadcasts rolling news, current affair programs, and knowledge programs.
MRTV News channel is intended for a replacement service for Mizzima TV and DVB TV used to be broadcast on MRTV Multi channel Play out System, from 24 March 2018, until 31 January 2021.

== MRTV Parliament ==
MRTV Parliament Channel is a Burmese free-to-air Parliamentary News channel, owned and operate by Myanmar Radio and Television. This channel is known for live coverage of the Assembly of the Union and House of Representatives Proceedings, and many more parliamentary related programes and political programmes. 'Parliamentary News' program is broadcast every weekday night at 7pm, including interview with the MP's, and Highlights of the Parliamentary section.

MRTV Parliament Channel
- Country: Myanmar
- Broadcast area: Myanmar; International
- Headquarters: Tatkon, Naypyidaw

Programming
- Language: Burmese
- Picture format: 1080i HDTV (downscaled to 480i for the SD feed)

Ownership
- Owner: Myanmar Radio and Television
- Sister channels: MRTV HD; MRTV News; MRTV NRC; MRTV Farmers; MRTV Sports; MRTV Entertainment; MITV

History
- Launched: 15 October 2013; 13 years ago

Links
- Website: www.mrtv.gov.mm

Availability

Terrestrial
- MRTV (Myanmar): Channel 3 (HD); RF Channel 31 554 MHz

Streaming media
- MRTV App: Channel 3 SD/HD

== Availability ==
Terrestrial
MRTV	Channel 2 (HD); RF Channel 31 554 MHz
Satellite
MRTV DTH	Channel 2 (HD)
Softtech Myanmar	Channel 2 (SD)
SKY NET	Channel 4 (SD)
CANAL+	Channel 200 (SD)
Intelsat 39 62°E	11137 V 30000 (HD)
Apstar 7 76.5°E	10973 V 24500 (SD)
Thaicom 6 78.5°E	3730 H 15000 (HD)

'MRTV News Channel' is available on MRTV DTT and MRTV DTH platform on channel number 2. CANAL+ DTH on channel number 200. SKYNET DTH on channel number 4.
plus, also available on several satellites, including Thaicom 6 (78.5°E) 3731/H/15000, Apstar 7 (76.5°E) 10973/V/24500, Intelsat 39 (62°E) 11137/V/30000.

== See also ==
- Myanmar Radio and Television
- MRTV (TV network)
- DVB TV (Competitor channel)
- Mizzima TV (Competitor channel)
