= MRTV Entertainment Channel =

Burmese television channel

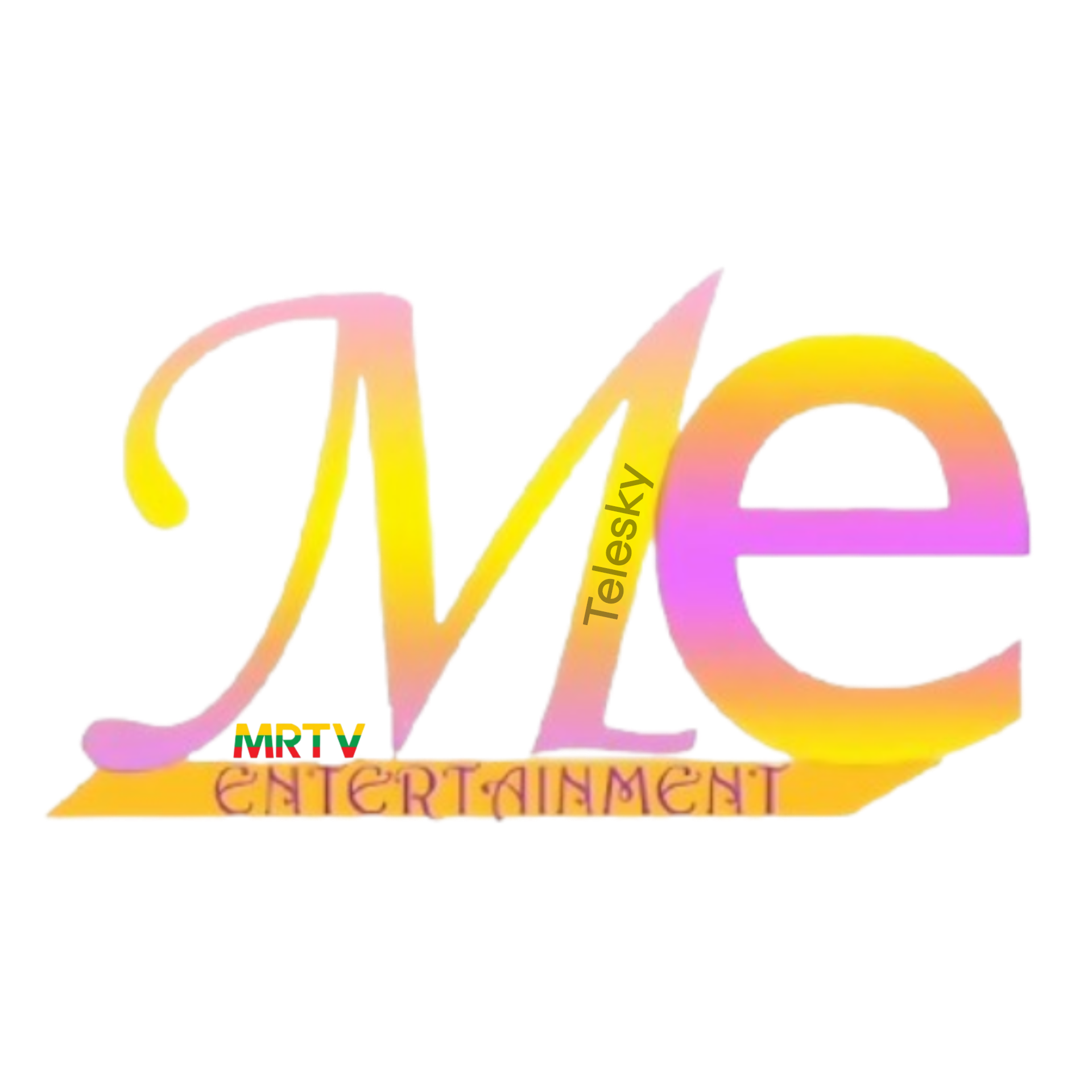
- Logo of MRTV Entertainment Channel
- Broadcast area: Myanmar
- Headquarters: Yangon

Programming
- Language: Burmese
- Picture format: 1080i 16:9 HD

Ownership
- Owner: MRTV
- Sister channels: MRTV HD; MRTV News; MRTV Parliament; MRTV NRC; MRTV Farmers; MRTV Sports; MITV

History
- Launched: 18 January 2025; 22 months ago

Availability

Terrestrial
- MRTV (Myanmar): Channel 7 (HD); RF Channel 31 554 MHz
- Thaicom 6 (Thailand): 3730 H 15000 (HD)
- Intelsat 39 (Myanmar): 11137 V 30000 (HD)
- GMM Z (Thailand): Channel 207 (HD)
- Infosat (Thailand): Channel 107 (SD)

MRTV Entertainment Channel is a Burmese digital free-to-air TV channel, owned by Myanmar Radio and Television launched on January 18, 2025. The channel's purpose is entertain the public, focusing on General Entertainment Programmes. MRTV Entertainment Channel is an entertainment channel that brings a variety of content, including live shows, music, movies, and exclusive interviews. While MRTV Entertainment and Channel ME are often mentioned separately, they are actually the same channel—just referred to by two different names. However, some people mistakenly confuse MRTV Entertainment Channel with M Entertainment Channel, which is a completely different entity.

== See also ==
- MRTV (TV network)
- MRTV-4
- M Entertainment Channel
- MNTV
