= Channel 9 (Burmese TV channel) =

Burmese television channel

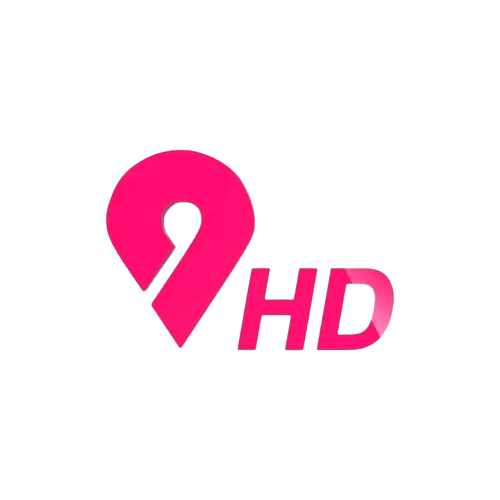
- Logo of Channel 9
- Country: Myanmar
- Broadcast area: Myanmar
- Headquarters: 139/171/A, Lower Pazundaung Road, Botataung Township, Yangon

Programming
- Language: Burmese
- Picture format: 1080i HDTV

Ownership
- Owner: Shwe Thanlwin
- Sister channels: MNTV

History
- Launched: 30 August 2013; 13 years ago (Skynet DTH only); 15 May 2014; 12 years ago (Free-to-air via DVB-T2)

Availability

Terrestrial
- MRTV (Myanmar): Channel 15 (SD); RF Channel 31 554 MHz
- Thaicom 6 (Thailand): 3730 H 15000 (SD)
- Intelsat 39: 11137 V 30000 (HD)
- Sky Net (Myanmar): Channel 9 (SD)
- CANAL+ (Myanmar): Channel 21 (SD)
- Softtech M1 (Myanmar): Channel 15 (SD)
- GMM Z (Thailand): Channel 215 (SD)
- Infosat (Thailand): Channel 115 (SD)

Channel 9 is a Burmese free-to-air television channel. It is operated by Shwe Thanlwin Media. Launched on 30 August 2013, the channel was broadcast only on Skynet DTH. On 15 May 2014, it was broadcast as free-to-air channel. Its headquarters are located in 139/171/A, Lower Pazundaung Road, Botataung Township, Yangon.

== Programing ==
- Myanmar Idol (season 4) (2019)
- Yin Khwin Shin Tan (2019)

== See also ==
- Myanmar National TV
