= Channel K =

Television station in Myanmar

Channel K HD
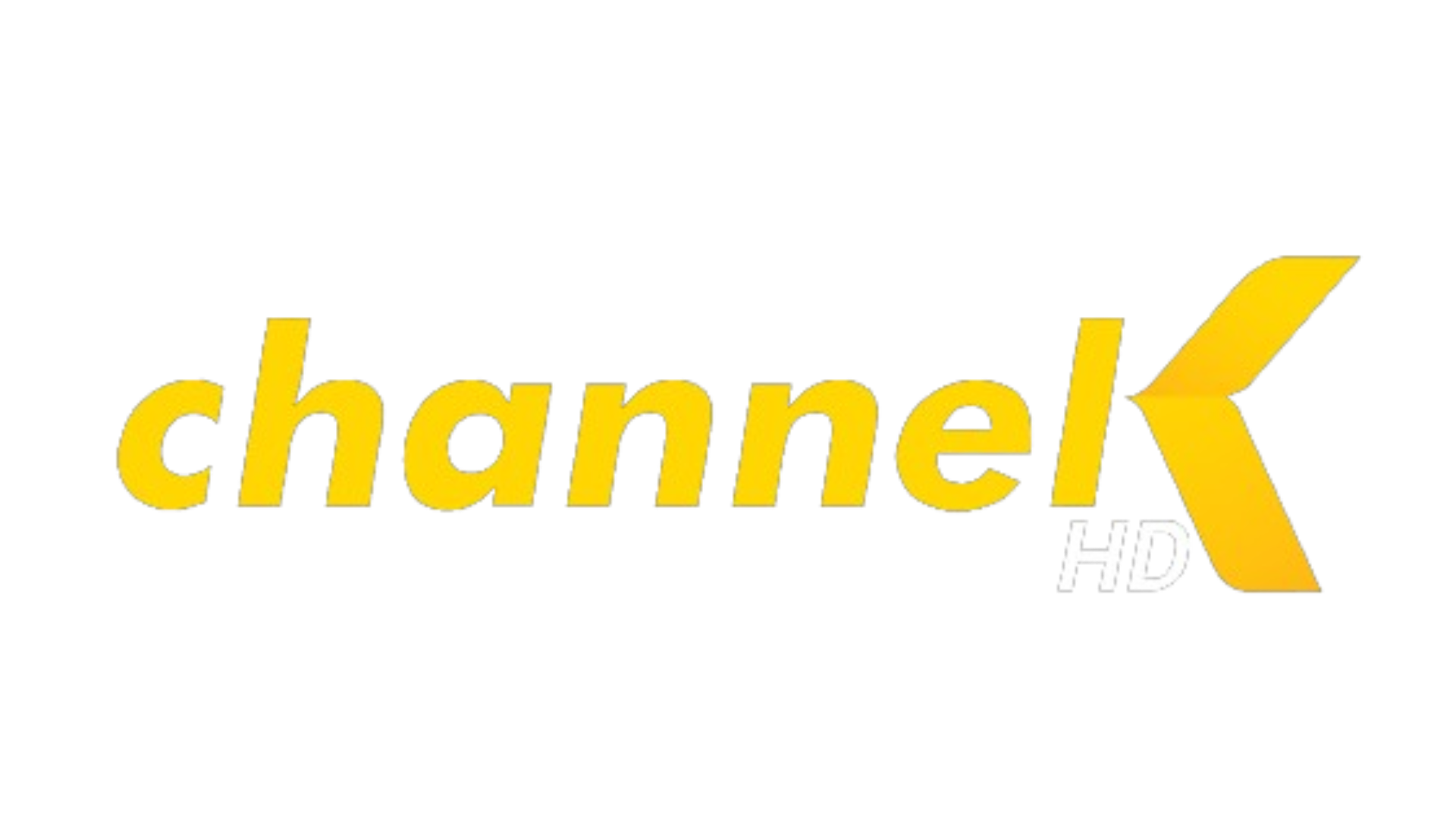
- Broadcast area: Myanmar
- Headquarters: Ground Floor, Kandawgyi Tower, Tamwe Township, Yangon

Programming
- Language: Burmese
- Picture format: 1080i (16:9 HDTV)

Ownership
- Owner: KMA Group

History
- Launched: 15 February 2019; 7 years ago

Links
- Website: www.channelkmyanmar.com

Availability

Terrestrial
- MRTV Multiplex 2 (Myanmar): Channel 4 (HD); RF Channel 35 586 MHz
- MRTV (Myanmar): Channel 17 (SD); RF Channel 31 554 MHz
- Thaicom 6 (Thailand): 3730 H 15000 (SD)
- Intelsat 39: 11137 V 30000 (SD)
- CANAL+ (Myanmar): Channel 27 (SD)
- Softtech M1 (Myanmar): Channel 4 (SD)
- GMM Z (Thailand): Channel 217 (SD)
- Infosat (Thailand): Channel 117 (SD)

Streaming media
- Channel K Online: Watch live

Channel K is a Burmese digital free-to-air TV channel that runs under MRTV's Multiplex Playout System based in Yangon, Myanmar. Channel K is operated by KMA Group. They signed a cooperation agreement with state-run Myanmar Radio and Television (MRTV) to operate as content providers for digital free-to-air TV channels in a multi-playout system of MRTV on 17 February 2018.

== Availability ==
Terrestrial
MRTV Multiplex 2	Channel 4 (HD); RF Channel 35 586 MHz
MRTV	Channel 17 (SD); RF Channel 31 554 MHz
Satellite
MRTV DTH	Channel 9 (SD)
Softtech Myanmar	Channel 4 (SD)
CANAL+	Channel 75 (SD)
Intelsat 39 62°E	11137 V 30000 (SD)

== See also ==
- Television in Myanmar
