= MRTV (disambiguation) =

MRTV may refer to:

- Hungarian Radio and Television (Magyar Rádió és Televízió)
- Myanmar Radio and Television
  - MRTV (TV network)
