= MNTV =

MNTV may refer to:

- Multiple non-transferable vote, also known as plurality-at-large voting, an electoral system
- MyNetworkTV, a broadcast syndication service in the United States
- Myanmar National TV, Burmese free-to-air television channel
