= Myanmar Bankers Union =

Trade union of bank employees in Myanmar

MBU
- Myanmar Bankers Union
- Location: Myanmar
- Key people: Ko Bo Bo, Founder
- Website: www.facebook.com/MyanmarBankersUnion

The Myanmar Bankers Union (MBU) is a trade union of bank employees in Myanmar. The trade union was formed as part of the civil disobedience movement following the 2021 Myanmar coup d'état.

== History ==
The MBU was formed by Ko Bo Bo on February 3, 2021 following the 2021 Myanmar coup d'état. Coordinating through Facebook, workers shut down operations at the Central Bank of Myanmar and most private banks since February 8. The aim was to deprive the Tatmadaw junta of money by stopping cash flows within Myanmar, which leaders of the civil disobedience movement saw as a central tool of opposing the junta. Between 500 and 1,000 workers joined MBU, while the union estimated that more than 6,000 workers had formally joined the civil disobedience movement and more had refused to work. A junta-appointed Central Bank deputy governor warned of long-term economic consequences if MBU did not stop its strike.

After Nay Pyi Taw Development Bank had allegedly fired workers who had protested against the coup, MBU organised a boycott of the bank. The union also forced Shwe Thanlwin to clarify it was not connected to the Tatmadaw and was allowing workers to protest.

In May, most bank staff still did not appear to work, though many banks had opened again by late April.
