= Quest to Million =

Burmese television program

- Genre: Game show
- Presented by: Phyo Zaw Lin
- Country of origin: Myanmar
- Original language: Burmese

Production
- Production location: Yangon
- Running time: 60 minutes Mondays to Fridays at 20:30 (MMT)

Original release
- Network: Channel ME
- Release: 1 November 2017 – present

Quest to Million, formerly known as 10 to Million is a Burmese reality television game show which is airing on Channel ME. The show has been airing since 2017.

== Game Format ==
There are 5 rounds in this game show. Compete with forty people, with the top two scoring first and answering ten questions with 3 choice. The contestants from the back will also have to follow. From the two contestants, the one with the lowest score had to leave. If the winner does not answer up to ten, he will get Ks.1,00,000/-. If he can answer all the questions, he will get Ks.10,00,000/-. The least point of nine contestant from the back will be eliminated and one will be competing against the winner. If he think he do not know the choice, he have the opportunity to answer his opponent which can be used until the final round. If the contest is correct, he will stop. In round 2, the two contestants will receive a save card which can be used until the final round. A save card is an opportunity card to answer another question when you make a mistake. He will not get the wrong score. So, he can't answer all ten, he will only get Ks.1,00,000/-.
