= YTV (Burmese TV network) =

- Logo of YTV
- Broadcast area: Myanmar
- Headquarters: 886/888, Pyay Rd., 9 Mile, Ward (5), Mayangone, Yangon, Myanmar

Programming
- Languages: Burmese; English
- Picture format: 1080i (HDTV)

Ownership
- Owner: MY Multimedia Co., Ltd

History
- Launched: 14 February 2019

Links
- Website: ytvmm.com

Availability

Terrestrial
- MRTV Multiplex 2 (Myanmar): Channel 6 (HD); RF Channel 35 586 MHz
- MRTV (Myanmar): Channel 18 (SD); RF Channel 31 554 MHz
- Thaicom 6 (Thailand): 3730 H 15000 (SD)
- Softtech M1 (Myanmar): Channel 9 (SD)
- GMM Z (Thailand): Channel 218 (SD)
- Infosat (Thailand): Channel 118 (SD)

YTV is a Burmese digital Free-to-Air TV channel that run under MRTV's Multiplex Playout System based in Yangon, Myanmar. YTV is operated by MY Multimedia Co., Ltd that part of Young Investment Group Co., Ltd. They have signed a cooperation agreement with MRTV to operate as content providers for digital free-to-air TV channels in a multi-playout system of MRTV. The trial was broadcast on 14 January 2019. On 14 February, they launched the channel officially. The channel broadcasts 24 hours a day now.

== History ==
The co-operation agreement between Union of Myanmar, was on 17 February 2018. They applied with Expression of Interest (EOI) through the official tender dated 22 September 2016 from Ministry of Information, Myanmar Radio & Television Department. 44 Organizations has applied Expression of Interest (EOI) and as first step in winners’ list was 42. 29 Organizations applied next to Request for Proposal (RFP) and on 11 April 2017 announced the achievement organizations including MY MULTIMEDIA Co., Ltd. which is Television Business Sector of Young Investment Group Co., Ltd. through 10 of initially list. They started the trial broadcasting with YTV News program at 7a.m on January 14, 2019.

== Programming ==
- Y Event
- Y Info
- Y Game
- Y Music
- Y Movie
- Y Series
- Y Promo

== Availability ==
Terrestrial
MRTV Multiplex 2	Channel 6 (HD); RF Channel 35 586 MHz
MRTV	Channel 18 (SD); RF Channel 31 554 MHz
Satellite
Softtech Myanmar	Channel 9 (SD)
CANAL+	Channel 76 (SD)
