= Myanmar National TV =

Burmese television channel

- Logo of MNTV
- Country: Myanmar
- Broadcast area: Myanmar
- Headquarters: 139/171/A, Lower Pazundaung Road, Botataung Township, Yangon

Programming
- Language: Burmese
- Picture format: 480i SDTV

Ownership
- Owner: Shwe Thanlwin
- Sister channels: Channel 9

History
- Launched: 1 October 2012; 14 years ago (Skynet DTH only); 15 May 2014; 12 years ago (Free-to-air via DVB-T2 and NTSC-M)
- Closed: 1 September 2021 (Analogue NTSC-M)

Availability

Terrestrial
- MRTV (Myanmar): Channel 14 (SD); RF Channel 31 554 MHz
- Thaicom 6 (Thailand): 3730 H 15000 (SD)
- Sky Net (Myanmar): Channel 6 (SD)
- CANAL+ (Myanmar): Channel 23 (SD)
- Softtech M1 (Myanmar): Channel 8 (SD)
- GMM Z (Thailand): Channel 214 (SD)
- Infosat (Thailand): Channel 114 (SD)

Myanmar National Television (MNTV) is a Burmese free-to-air television channel. MNTV was founded by Shwe Thanlwin and operated by Dream Vision Co., Ltd. (Note: Dream Vision Co., Ltd was established under the umbrella of Shwe Thanlwin.) Launched on 1 October 2012, the channel was broadcast only on Skynet DTH. On 15 May 2014, it was broadcast as free-to-air channel. Its headquarters are located in 139/171/A, Lower Pazundaung Road, Botataung Township, Yangon.

== Programming ==
- Myanmar Idol (season 1) (2015)
- Myanmar Idol (season 2) (2016)
- Charm (2016)
- Shwe Moe Ngwe Moe Thoon Phyo Lo Ywar (2016)
- Yadanabon (2017)
- Mingalar Shi Tae A Yat (2017)
- Myanmar Idol (season 3) (2018)
- 74 Days of Love (2020)

== Availability ==
Terrestrial
MRTV	Channel 14; RF Channel 31 554 MHz
Satellite
SKY NET	Channel 6
Softtech Myanmar	Channel 8
CANAL+	Channel 70

== See also ==
- Channel 9
