= M Media (TV Channel) =

Burmese television channel

M Channel
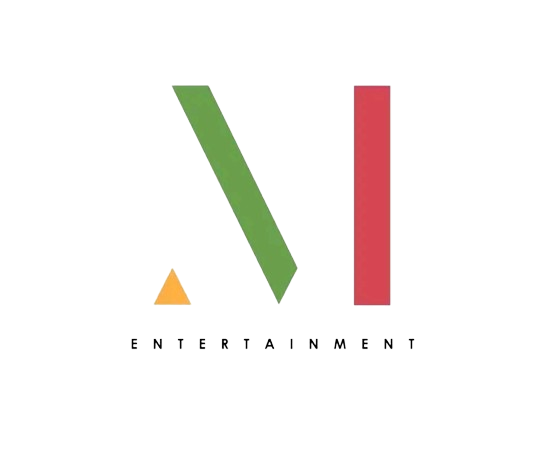
- Logo of M Channel
- Broadcast area: Myanmar
- Headquarters: Yangon

Programming
- Languages: Burmese; English
- Picture format: 1080i HDTV (downscaled to 480i for the SD feed)

Ownership
- Owner: Media N Co., Ltd

History
- Launched: 1 January 2015; 11 years ago
- Former names: MRTV Entertainment (2015-2020); Channel ME (2020-2023); M Entertainenment Channel (2023-2026)

Availability

Terrestrial
- MRTV Multiplex 2 (Myanmar): Channel 3 (HD); RF Channel 35 586 MHz
- MRTV (Myanmar): Channel 10 (SD); RF Channel 31 554 MHz
- Thaicom 6 (Thailand): 3730 H 15000 (SD)
- Intelsat 39: 11137 V 30000 (SD)
- Sky Net (Myanmar): Channel 51 (SD)
- Softtech M1 (Myanmar): Channel 6 (SD)
- GMM Z (Thailand): Channel 210 (SD)
- Infosat (Thailand): Channel 110 (SD)

M Channel (formerly knows as M Entertainenment Channel) is a free-to-air channel broadcasting 24 hours with the sole purpose of entertaining the public. Broadcast from Yangon mainly by Media N Co., Ltd. Channel ME (former MRTV Entertainment) changed name to M Entertainment Channel in April, 2023. M Channel is mainly owned by Media N Co., Ltd.

== Programming ==
- Ming Dynasty (since 2023)
- Street Dance of China (since 2023)
- Heartstrings (since 2023)
- The Curse (since 2024)
- Date With Me? (since 2024)

== Availability ==
Terrestrial
MRTV Multiplex 2	Channel 3 (HD); RF Channel 35 586 MHz
MRTV	Channel 10 (SD); RF Channel 31 554 MHz
Satellite
MRTV DTH	Channel 9 (HD)
SKY NET DTH	Channel 51 (SD)
Softtech M1 Myanmar	Channel 6 (SD)
Intelsat 39 62°E	11137 V 30000 (HD)

== See also ==
- MRTV (Broadcast Network)
- MRTV-4
