= Shwe FM =

Programming
- Language: Burmese

Ownership
- Owner: Shwe Thanlwin

History
- Founded: 2009; 17 years ago

Links
- Website: www.shwefmradio.com

Shwe FM is a privately owned radio station that serves Myanmar, reaching 98% of the country, including the Yangon metropolitan region, Bago and Tanintharyi Regions, and Mon and Kayin States. Its offices are located in Yangon's Botataung Township. The radio station was launched in 2009 as part of the Ministry of Information's efforts to privatize radio broadcasting, and broadcasts Burmese music, comedy and entertainment programs. In 2014, it began broadcasting a BBC Burmese program, English at Work. The radio station is owned by Shwe Thanlwin.
