= Shwe Moe Ngwe Moe Thoon Phyo Lo Ywar =

Burmese television series

- Poster
- Burmese: ရွှေမိုးငွေမိုးသွန်းဖြိုးလို့ရွာ
- Genre: Comedy
- Screenplay by: Nay Soe Thaw
- Story by: Nay Soe Thaw
- Directed by: Aww Ra Tha
- Starring: Htun Htun; Ye Lay; Nyi Htut Khaung; Joker; Nan Myat Phyo Thin; Hsu Myat Noe Oo; May Pan Chi; Than Than Soe
- Country of origin: Myanmar
- Original language: Burmese
- No. of episodes: 20

Production
- Production location: Myanmar
- Running time: 40 minutes
- Production company: Myanmar Media 7

Original release
- Network: MNTV
- Release: 24 July – 4 December 2016

Shwe Moe Ngwe Moe Thoon Phyo Lo Ywar (Burmese: ရွှေမိုးငွေမိုးသွန်းဖြိုးလို့ရွာ) is a 2016 Burmese comedy television series. It aired on MNTV, from July 24 to December 4, 2016, on every sunday at 19:20 for 20 episodes.

== Cast ==
- Htun Htun as Shwe Moe
- Ye Lay as Thiha
- Nyi Htut Khaung as Ngwe Moe
- Joker as Joker
- Nan Myat Phyo Thin as Thoon Phyo
- Hsu Myat Noe Oo as Kit Kit
- May Pan Chi as Kay Thi
- Than Than Soe as Daw Ar Kyal
