= 5 PLUS =

Burmese free-to-air television channel

- Country: Myanmar
- Broadcast area: Myanmar
- Headquarters: Yangon

Programming
- Language: Burmese
- Picture format: 1080i HDTV

Ownership
- Owner: Family Entertainment Group

History
- Launched: 12 February 2012; 14 years ago

Availability

Terrestrial
- MRTV Multiplex 2 (Myanmar): Channel 7 (HD); RF Channel 35 586 MHz
- MRTV (Myanmar): Channel 13 (SD); RF Channel 31 554 MHz
- Thaicom 6 (Thailand): 3730 H 15000 (SD)
- GMM Z (Thailand): Channel 213 (SD)
- Infosat (Thailand): Channel 113 (SD)

Family Entertainment Group 5 Network
- Type: Subsidiary
- Industry: Media Production
- Founded: 2005
- Headquarters: Yangon, Myanmar
- Number of locations: (2021)
- Products: Television Production; Television Channel
- Parent: Forever Group

5 PLUS is a Burmese digital free-to-air TV channel that runs under MRTV's Multiplex Playout System based in Yangon, Myanmar. 5 Plus is operated by Family Entertainment Group and was launched on 12 February 2012. On 14 May 2014, they signed a cooperation agreement with MRTV to operate as content providers for digital free-to-air TV channels in a multi-playout system of MRTV.
