= Ye Lay =

Burmese hip hop singer-songwriter

Ye Lay ရဲလေး
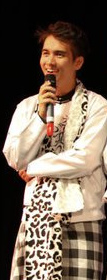
- Ye Lay performing in 2011.

Background information
- Born: 11 January 1984 (age 42); Rangoon, Burma
- Genre: Hip hop
- Occupations: Singer; Rapper; Actor
- Instrument: Voice
- Years active: 2002–present

Ye Lay (Burmese: ရဲလေး; born Ye Htun Min on 11 January 1984) is a Burmese hip hop singer-songwriter, musician, actor and model. He is one of the stars of the Burmese entertainment industry.

In 2011, he was the subject of a hoax that claimed he had been stabbed in a fight. He published a 212-page autobiography entitled Mad...Sea (ရူးသွပ်ခြင်း...ပင်လယ်) on 25 March 2012.

In May 2013, he married Aye Mya Aung, the daughter of Burmese minister Aung Min. The couple then divorced in late 2017.

== Discography ==
=== Solo albums ===
- Kya Taw Nhint That Sine Thaw (ကျွန်တော်နှင့် သက်ဆိုင်သော) (2005)
- Eain အိမ် (2006)
- Third Kar Yan (တတိယကာရန်) (The Third Rhyme) (2009)
- Ya Kauk Bawa Phit Nay Htaing Chin (ရကောက်ဘဝဖြင့် နေထိုင်ခြင်း) (2014)
- Nauk Ta Kauk (နောက်တစ်ခေါက်) (Once More) (2015)
- Aung Myin Mhu Kha Yee Sin (အောင်မြင်မှုခရီးစဉ်)
- First Live Concert (2008)
- Selection (2017)

== TV show ==
He was involved as a Judge in Myanmar Idol season 1 (2015-2016).

- Shwe Moe Ngwe Moe Thoon Phyo Lo Ywar (2016)
