= Sky Net =

Satellite TV company in Myanmar

Skynet DTH
- Product type: Paid satellite TV
- Current owner: Shwe Thanlwin Media Company Limited
- Country: Myanmar
- Introduced: November 2010
- Markets: Across Myanmar
- Website: www.skynet.com.mm

SKYNET Direct to Home (DTH), is a pay TV operator that provides nationwide satellite television in Myanmar. Owner Shwe Than Lwin Media Co., Ltd. is part of a conglomerate with diverse interests in Myanmar, they launched the broadcaster in November 2010. SKYNET DTH broadcasts a total 80 channels via Apstar 7 satellite, provide internet services in the Pacific Asia region, and employ more than 2000 staff. Owner and chairman of SKYNET DTH is Sino-Burmese businessman, Kyaw Win.

== Channels ==
Launching SKYNET DTH with 24 channels, including Spanish La Liga, Italian Serie A, German Bundesliga, French Ligue 1, Hero I-League, Indian Super League, American Major League Soccer, Australian A-League, NBA, CCL, Saudi Professional League, Saudi Super Cup, Myanmar National League and other sports and entertainment and expanding to 80 channels with media rights for competitions held by UEFA (Euro 2012, UEFA Champions League, Europa League). SKYNET DTH started broadcasting all matches of the Air KBZ Myanmar Lethwei World Championship, Premier League, IPL from the 2013–14 season after acquiring rights from FA. SKYNET DTH also have media rights of FIFA competitions, enabling SKYNET to broadcast live the FIFA World Cup 2018. It also has media rights to all of WWE, which broadcasts RAW, Smack Down Live, NXT and other pay-per-view shows from WWE.

The 2021 Myanmar coup d'état saw SKYNET DTH stop broadcasting some international channels, like Fox Network (now is Walt Disney Asia Pacific), Lifetime, CNN, BBC and more. As of November 2026, the total number of channels is 54.

No	CHANNEL NAME	Channels resolution
1	Skynet Buddha	480i
2	MRTV	480i
3	MWD	480i
4	MRTV News	480i
5	MITV	480i
6	MNTV	480i
7	Skynet Info	480i
9	Channel 9 HD	1080i
10	Skynet Up To Date	480i
11	Skynet Cartoon	480i
12	ZooMoo HD	1080i
13	Nick jr	480i
14	Nickelodeon	480i
15	Animax	480i
16	DreamWorks	480i
17	Skynet Myanmar Movies	480i
18	Skynet Asian Movies	480i
19	Skynet World Movies HD	1080i
20	Skynet Action Movies HD	1080i
21	Skynet Movie Collection HD	1080i
22	Rock Action HD	1080i
23	Rock Entertainment HD	1080i
24	Skynet International Drama HD	1080i
25	SKY Premiere HD	1080i
26	Sun TV	480i
27	KTV	480i
28	Colors Cineplex	480i
29	AXN	480i
30	Skynet Music	480i
31	Test Card	1080i
32	Skynet Lifeloom	480i
33	Skynet Heritage	480i
34	Love Nature HD	1080i
35	Global Trekker HD	1080i
36	History HD	1080i
37	NHK World Premium	480i
38	CGTN Documentary	480i
39	CCTV-4	480i
40	Skynet Sports-1	480i
41	Skynet Sports-2	480i
42	Skynet Sports-3 HD	1080i
43	Skynet Sports X HD	1080i
44	FIGHT SPORT HD	1080i
45	Edge Sport	480i
46	Golf Channel	480i
47	Skynet Pay Per Views HD-2	1080i
48	Uni TV	480i
49	Fortune TV	480i
50	SNDSY Entertainment	480i
51	M Channel	480i
52	Shwe FM 1	Radio
53	Shwe FM 2	Radio
54	Myanmar International Radio	Radio
