= CTH (company) =

Thai pay TV and Internet services provider

CTH Public Company Limited
- Formerly: Cable Thai Holding Public Company Limited
- Industry: Pay television
- Founded: 2009
- Headquarters: Prawet, Bangkok
- Area served: Southeast Asia
- Key people: Wichai Thongtang, Chairman
- Products: Cable TV, Satellite TV
- Website: http://www.cth.co.th (archived)

CTH Public Company Limited (CTH), formerly known as Cable Thai Holding Public Company Limited, was a Thai pay TV operator and Internet broadband services provider.

It was founded by a large group of cable television operators as Cable Thai Holding, a holding company established for dealing and share its content. It was offering pay television channels on an analog CATV system which had a largest customer base in Thailand with over 2.5 million households before started its own pay TV business as CTH.

CTH held English Premier League broadcast rights for season 2013/14 till 2015/16 in Thailand, Laos and Cambodia.

== History ==
=== Early history ===
Cable Thai Holding Public Company Limited was set up in August 2009 by over 100 Thailand cable television operators with initial capital of 50 million baht. Its mission was to provide TV program licenses, unified channel line up, marketing for member cable operators to expand their subscriber base.

In February 2010, the company, headed by president Kesem Inkaew who was also president of Thailand Cable TV Association, started its CTH platform with 26 leading cable channels broadcast via ABS1 satellite for its member cable operators to redistribute to their subscribers.

=== Expansion ===
Major change to the company organization happened in April 2012, when Wichai Thongtang, a businessman and former Thaksin Shinawatra lawyer, acquired 25% of CTH while Thai Rath newspaper family, headed by Vachara Vacharapol, acquired another 25% of the company. CTH also looked for another partner for 20% stake while the remaining 30% was still held by cable operators. The company capital was also raised to 1 billion baht. Wichai Thongtang became the company chairman.

In August 2012, TrueVisions announced partnership with CTH to allow CTH access to nine channels produced by TrueVisions.

In November 2012, CTH won the broadcast right to English Premier League from 2013–14 to 2015–16 seasons with the highest price in Asia and the second highest in the world valued $320 million.

The service started broadcast via cable-TV providers and on satellite via Vinasat-2 in mid-August 2013, just weeks before English Premier League started its new season.

In September 2013, CTH filed a lawsuit against Apple Inc. and its local company, Apple South Asia (Thailand), accusing of violating intellectual property rights for commercial purposes and counterfeiting or altering a registered trademark for ฿100 million after they allow an app call "Sports Channel" that allow the user to watch EPL live broadcasts to be sold on Apple's App Store.

In January 2014, CTH collaborated with PSI Holdings to offer English Premier League packages in lower price aiming to expand the subscribers. CTH also acquired the broadcast rights to WWE programmes in a five-year deal to broadcast on CTH Sport Spirit channel and later on dedicated CTH WWE channel.

In February 2014, the company stated that it would focus more on satellite-TV operators to expand its subscriber base and by June the company reduced its cable partners to about 100 operators from 170.

In June 2014, CTH Public Company Limited chose Inview Technology and Irdeto to introduce OTT and hybrid versions of its cable services.

In July 2014, CTH announced a business partnership with GMM Grammy to acquire its pay-TV subsidiary, GMM B who is operating pay-TV business branded Z Pay-TV, including its channels and content such as UEFA Euro 2016 in exchange of 10% stake of CTH.

=== Downfall ===
In November 2015, CTH began to revoke its service via over 170 local cable service providers after they turned the focus into satellite TV after the merger of GMM B. In the same month, they lost Premier League bid for the next three seasons to beIN Sports with a lower price than theirs from the last three years.

In late January 2016, CTH cancelled their Z Pay-TV packages provided for GMM Z customer following by the cancellation of its channels on PSI and RS Sunbox packages in February 2016.

On 1 August 2016, CTH ceased its KU-band broadcast via Thaicom satellite after they laid off its around 100 employees and announced to cease all of their broadcasting service on 1 September 2016 after its rival TrueVisions acquired sub-licensing rights to broadcast Premier League from beIN Sport until 2019. CTH said it can no longer withstand the impact of the economic slowdown. It was reported the company has a losses of almost 20 billion baht.

== Controversy ==
WWE file a lawsuit against CTH in August 2015 after they failed to pay the license fee since March 2014 and being warned that the company was in breach of agreement. WWE was awarded $23.8 million by the federal court. CTH stopped its broadcast of WWE contents on 7 September 2015.

On 14 December 2016, Fox Networks Group Asia has filed legal actions against Bangkok Bank as a guarantor for distribution fees of their contract with CTH and GMM Grammy for $71 million.

== Channels ==
=== Channels produced by CTH ===
==== Sports ====
- Stadium 1
- Stadium 2
- Stadium 3
- Stadium 4
- Stadium 5
- Stadium 6
- Stadium X

=== Channels produced by GMM B ===
==== Sports ====
- GMM Football Extra
- GMM Football Plus
- GMM Football Euro
- GMM Club Channel
- GMM Sport Extreme
- GMM Sport Plus
