= Young Investment Group =

Young Investment Group (YIG)
- Company type: Private
- Industry: Conglomerate, across multiple business sectors
- Founded: 1998
- Founder: Thiha Aung
- Headquarters: Myanmar
- Products: Insurance, Finance, IT & Telecom, Energy, Mining, Automobile, Construction, Manufacturing and Trading, TV broadcasting, Hospitality
- Number of employees: 6000 local and worldwide
- Website: http://www.yigmm.com/

Young Investment Group (YIG) is a private company established in 1998 in Myanmar which employs more than 6000 local workers and operates 16 subsidiaries in Myanmar, China and Singapore.

== YIG Business Sectors ==
The conglomerate is involved in various business sectors in Myanmar, ranging from trading and automobiles to insurance and microfinance.

Young Investment Group (YIG) operates in various business sectors in Myanmar. They have established themselves as a prominent player in these industries, contributing to the country's economic development. YIG conducts its operations in the insurance sector through Young Insurance Global Co. Ltd., which holds a government-issued insurance license. This designation places them among the few companies authorized to provide insurance services in Myanmar. IG also holds a finance license from the Myanmar Government, enabling them to engage in SME financing. Additionally, they have a separate entity dedicated to providing microfinancing services, further bolstering their presence in the financial sector. WYIG is involved in various aspects of the energy sector, including oil and gas exploration (E&P), surveying, logistics, and hydropower projects such as Myitha and Yazagyo Hydropower. They have also secured key PSC (Production Sharing Contract) blocks in partnership with Pacific Hunt Energy Corp, marking their significance in Myanmar's energy landscape. The trading arm of YIG oversees the import of heavy machinery, construction materials, and automobiles while facilitating the export of manufactured goods, thus fostering international trade connections. In the mining industry, YIG's mining companies are significant players in Myanmar, engaged in the extraction of precious gems like rubies and jade, as well as mining for gold and minerals, further contributing to the nation's mineral resources. YIG also operates manufacturing facilities, producing a wide range of manufactured goods, and they have factories in the Magway and Mandalay regions. Their construction arm is actively involved in real estate development, infrastructure projects, housing, and factory construction, contributing to the growth of the construction industry in Myanmar. YIG has ventured into the TV broadcasting sector with YTV, a free-to-air channel which adds to its diversified portfolio of businesses.
