= Myawaddy TV =

Myanmar military-Coup television network

Myawaddy TV/MWD
- Country: Myanmar

Programming
- Picture format: 1080i (16:9 HDTV)

Ownership
- Owner: Myanmar Armed Forces
- Sister channels: MWD Variety; MWD Education, Knowledge, and Sports

History
- Launched: 27 March 1995; 31 years ago (NTSC-M); October 2010 (DVB-T); 14 March 2020 (DVB-T2)
- Closed: 13 March 2020 (NTSC-M and DVB-T)

Links
- Website: https://www.myawady.net.mm/

Availability

Terrestrial
- Digital Terrestrial Television (Myanmar): Channel 4 (HD); RF Channel 42 642 MHz

Myawaddy TV (Burmese: မြဝတီ ရုပ်မြင်သံကြား, abbreviated as MWD) is a military-owned television network in Myanmar, based in Yangon and Naypyidaw. Myawaddy TV has been widely criticized for broadcasting pro-SAC (State Administration Council) news. It has seven television channels.

== History ==
Myawaddy TV was launched on 27 March 1995 to commemorate Myanmar's Armed Forces Day, marking the 50th anniversary of its founding. Its programming is also broadcast via the AsiaSat 2 satellite. MWD was the second television station in Myanmar, following MRTV. In 2021, it was used to formally announce the military takeover of Myanmar. In response to the coup, Facebook removed the page of the military-owned Myawaddy TV Network for violating its policy prohibiting organizations that promote hate speech or violence. This was later followed by YouTube, which terminated their channel along with MRTV for similar reasons.

== Expansion ==
In 2012, following the completion of a new TV station in Naypyidaw, MWD launched six new digital channels and extended its broadcasting hours on these channels to better compete with other local television stations.

== Channels ==
All channels from the MWD television network are 24-hour free-to-air channels. The current channels of the MWD television network are:

Channel	Picture format	EPG Name	Programming	Note
MWD Digital MUX
1	1080i 16:9	MWD Variety HD	MWD Variety Programming	Presentation and Play Out System are based on Naypyitaw
2	1080i 16:9	Kalay TV HD	Kalay TV (Children's TV) Programming	
3	1080i 16:9	MWD Education Knowledge and Sports HD	MWD Educational and Knowledge and Sports Programming	
4	1080i 16:9	MWD HD	Main Myawaddy TV Programming	Presentation and Play Out System are based on Yangon
5	1080i 16:9	Channel B HD	Channel B Programming	Commercial service
6	1080i 16:9	Golden Land HD	Golden Land channel programming	Commercial service
7	1080i 16:9	Noble Star HD	Noble Star TV programming	Commercial service
A1	Audio only	Thazin	Thazin FM Radio Programming	
A2	Audio only	Star FM	Star FM Radio Programming	

Relay Station	Transmitter Site	Frequency Channel	Transmitter Power (ERP)
Naypyitaw	Naypyitaw Myawaddy Television Centre	E42 642 MHz	3KW
Yangon	Bouth Htaw transmission tower, Myawaddy Media Centre, Moe Kaung Rd, Yankin tws	E42 642 MHz	3KW
Yangon	Myawaddy Television Centre 1, Number 1 Armed Forces Television Broadcasting Regiment, Hmawbe tws	E48 690 MHz	3KW
Mandalay	?	E42 642 MHz	3KW
Monywa	?	E40 626 MHz	3KW
Pyin Oo Lwin	?	E46 674 MHz	600W
Meiktila	?	E42 642 MHz	3KW
Kyaukpadaung	Mount Gway Gyo	E21 474 MHz	3KW
Minbu; Magway	Minbu	E44 658 MHz	3KW
Taunggyi	Near Shwe Bone Pwint Pagoda	E42 642 MHz	3KW
Lahio	Near Sāsanar Year 2500 Pagoda & MRTV Relay station	E42 642 MHz	1KW
Keng Tung	?	E42 642 MHz	300W
Namsang	?	E40 626 MHz	300W
Lwaksawk and Bahtoo	?	E41 634 MHz	300W
Myitkyina	Near Myitkyina Airport	E42 642 MHz	1KW
Sittwe	?	E42 642 MHz	3KW
Mawlamyine	?	E42 642 MHz	3KW
Bago	?	E46 674 MHz	3KW
Pyay	Near Shwe Sam Taw Pagoda & MRTV Relay station, Min Gyi Taung	E46 674 MHz	3KW
Taungoo	?	E42 642 MHz	3KW
Pathein	?	E42 642 MHz	3KW

== Programming ==
=== TV programs ===
- Melody World

=== TV series ===
- Legends of Warriors

=== Imported TV series ===
- Justic Pao
- Autumn in My Heart
- Pokémon (TV series)
- Ne Zha

== Availability ==
Terrestrial
Digital Terrestrial Television (MWD Digital)	Channel 4 (HD); RF Channel 42 642 MHz
Satellite
MRTV DTH	Channel 11 (SD)
Softtech Myanmar	Channel 12 (SD)
SKY NET	Channel 3 (SD)
CANAL+	Channel 201 (SD)
Intelsat 39 62°E	11137 V 30000 (SD)
Laosat 1 128.5°E	3576 V 21600 (HD)

== See also ==
- Myanmar Radio and Television
- MRTV-4
- Myanmar International
