= Yangon City FM =

Radio Station in Yangon, Myanmar

Coordinates: 16°48′57.2″N 96°09′14.0″E

Yangon; Myanmar
- Frequency: 89.0 MHz FM

Programming
- Format: News and entertainment

Ownership
- Owner: Yangon City Development Committee

History
- First air date: November 2001; 24 years ago

Technical information
- Power: 50 kW

Links
- Website: www.yangoncity.com.mm

Yangon City FM is a radio station that serves the Yangon metropolitan area in Myanmar, broadcasting on the FM band at a frequency of 89.0 MHz and on the Internet. Operated by the city government, Yangon City Development Committee (YCDC), City FM is one of two radio stations available in Yangon. Yangon's sole FM station employs a pop culture-oriented format with a focus on Burmese and English pop music, entertainment programs, live celebrity interviews, etc. The station is highly popular, especially among the youth (mainly 20s and 30s ), as it provides an alternative to the dreary propaganda-laden programming of Myanmar Radio National Service.

City FM has come under fire for playing popular albums of various artists without paying any royalties. The highly profitable station has steadfastly refused to compensate the artists citing the lack of copyright laws in Myanmar.

Nonetheless, City FM has become a force in Myanmar's pop music scene. Its annual award shows, the Yangon City FM Awards, are highly popular with the public, and artists vie to be part of the annual ceremony. The VCDs of the award shows sell briskly, although perhaps ironically, most of them are pirated.

Since September 2009, City FM has used a 43 meters (141 feet) antenna atop an 11th floor of a downtown government building, and increased its range of broadcast to 80 km (50 mi).
