= Myanmar International =

Burmese international television channel

Myanmar International Television (MITV)
- Country: Myanmar
- Broadcast area: Myanmar; International

Programming
- Language: English
- Picture format: 1080i (16:9 HDTV) (downscaled to 480i for the SDTV feed)

Ownership
- Owner: Ministry of Information

History
- Launched: 1 August 2001; 25 years ago
- Former names: MRTV-3 (2001–2010)

Links
- Website: www.myanmaritv.com

Availability

Terrestrial
- MRTV (Myanmar): Channel 8 (SD); RF Channel 31 554 MHz
- Thaicom 6 (Thailand): 3730 H 15000 (SD)
- Intelsat 39: 11137 V 30000 (HD)
- Sky Net (Myanmar): Channel 5 (SD)
- CANAL+ (Myanmar): Channel 23 (SD)
- Softtech M1 (Myanmar): Channel 3 (SD)
- GMM Z (Thailand): Channel 210 (SD)
- Infosat (Thailand): Channel 110 (SD)

Myanmar International Television (abbreviated MITV) is a Burmese state-owned national and international English-language television channel based in Yangon, Myanmar. The channel was first launched in August 2001 as MRTV-3, the third ever television channel in Myanmar. It was rebranded as Myanmar International Television in April 2010.

== Overview ==
The channel was first launched on 1 August 2001 was financed with a $1 million grant from Japan and is broadcast on the Shin Corp Thaicom 3 satellite. It is the third channel to be launched in Myanmar, after the main MRTV channel (1980) and Myawaddy TV (1995). The state-owned channel was viewable in 156 countries, broadcasting 17 hours a day in Myanmar and 8 hours a day in Europe and America, with coverage increasing to 24 hours a day worldwide on the occasion of the rebranding to Myanmar International.

The service is one of several television channels freely available in Myanmar.

According to Ye Tun, assistant manager of Myanmar International, the purposes of the channel are threefold: "to inform, to educate and to entertain the public and broadcast healthy programs". However, the channel has been criticised for broadcasting propaganda for the junta. A government official said the channel was launched to provide an "objective response" to international media reports about Burma.

A web-based video streaming system was launched in November 2002, and an online newspaper in March 2003. The channel has news exchange agreements with CCTV, NHK, Arirang TV and CFI.

== Programming ==
News programmes regularly feature army and political leaders, while entertainment programmes feature ethnic groups singing songs of national unity. Myanmar Mosaic features cookery, cultural and tourism programmes about Burma.

During the 2007 Burmese anti-government protests, the channel criticised Western media outlets for "fabricating stories" about the incident, describing them as "not happy with peace, stability and development of the [Burmese] nation." A news programme broadcast slides reading "VOA and BBC, sky full of liars. Beware of destructionists, BBC and VOA." The channel reported on the protests after several days.

== Availability ==
Terrestrial
MRTV	Channel 8 RF Channel 31 554 MHz
Satellite
MRTV DTH	Channel 8
Softtech Myanmar	Channel 3
SKY NET	Channel 5
CANAL+	Channel 71
Thaicom 6 78.5°E	3730 H 15000
Apstar 7 76.5°E	10973 V 24500
Intelsat 39 62°E	11137 V 30000

== See also ==
- Media of Burma
- Communications in Burma
- Myanmar TV
