= MRTV Sports Channel =

Burmese television channel

HEY Play Sports (MRTV Sports)
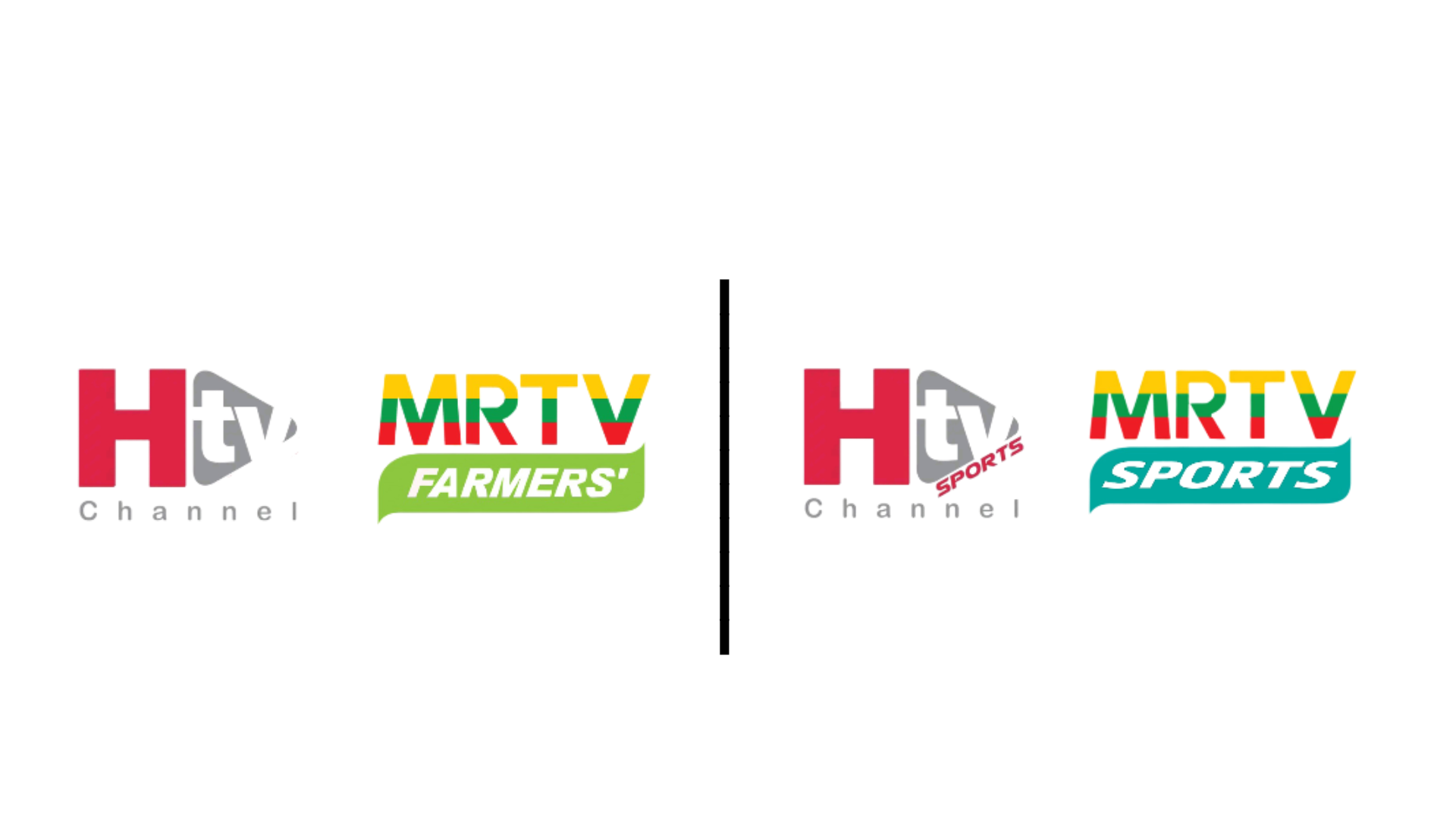
- Logo of HEY Play Sports Channel (MRTV Sports)
- Broadcast area: Myanmar
- Headquarters: Yangon

Programming
- Languages: Burmese; English
- Picture format: 1080i 16:9 HD (downscaled to 480i for the SD feed)

Ownership
- Owner: MRTV, HEY Play

History
- Launched: 1 August 2023; 3 years ago (Regular programming)

Links
- Website: www.heyplaymyanmar.com www.mrtv.gov.mm

Availability

Terrestrial
- MRTV Multiplex 2 (Myanmar): Channel 2 (HD); RF Channel 35 586 MHz
- MRTV (Myanmar): Channel 6 (SD); RF Channel 31 554 MHz

MRTV Sports Channel is a Burmese digital Free-to-Air Sports channel. It is a joint venture between MRTV and HEY Play Media. launched on 1 August 2023. This channel broadcasts bilingual programming bloc, under the MRTV Sports and HEY Play Sports branding. This channel began on 15 October 2013 in preparation for the 2013 Southeast Asian Games. For the first 10 years, MRTV Sports had no regular programming lineup. It aired during live sporting events and other live events.

== Programming ==
Program's broadcast on HTV Channel, MRTV Farmers, HTV Sports, MRTV Sports.

HTV Channel
HTV Movies	since 2023
HTV Documentary	since 2023
My Husband's Secret	2023
MRTV Farmers
Farmers News	since 2013
Weather	since 2013
Farming program's	since 2013
Agricultural program's	since 2013
HEY Play Sports
Myanmar National League Match's	since 2023
Mobile Legends Burmese Match's	since 2024
E-Sports Evening	since 2024
HTV Sports Documentary	since 2024
HTV Sports Movies	since 2024
MRTV Sports
MRTV Sports News	since 2021
Soccer View	since 2019
Weekly Sports Info	since 2019
Myanmar Football Federation Match's (Replay)	2019–2023

== Availablity ==
Terrestrial
MRTV	Channel 6 (SD); RF Channel 31 554 MHz
Sattellite
MRTV DTH	Channel 18 (HD)
CANAL+	Channel 45 (SD)
Softtech Myanmar	Channel 13 (SD)
Intelsat 39 62°E	11137 V 30000 (HD)
