= Myanmar Radio =

Broadcasting organization in Myanmar

Coordinates: 20°10′13″N 96°10′11″E

Myanmar Radio National Service
- Myanmar
- Frequencies: AM: 576 KHz, 594 kHz; SW: 5985 kHz, 9730 kHz; FM: 87.6 MHz, 94.6 MHz, 94.9 MHz
- Branding: Myanmar Radio

Programming
- Format: News and entertainment

Ownership
- Owner: Myanmar Radio and Television
- Sister stations: Myanmar Radio Minorities Service; Myanmar Radio International; Tha Pyay Radio; Mayu FM

History
- First air date: 15 February 1946

Technical information
- Power: 50 kW

Myanmar Radio Minorities Service
- Myanmar
- Frequencies: AM: 729 KHz; SW: 4725 kHz, 5915 kHz; DAB+: 178.352 MHz
- Branding: Upper Tineyinthar; Lower Tineyinthar

Programming
- Format: News and entertainment

Ownership
- Owner: Myanmar Radio and Television

History
- First air date: 12 February 1958

Technical information
- Power: 50 kW

Myanmar Radio International
- Myanmar
- Frequencies: FM: 94.6 MHz, 99.0 MHz, 101.7 MHz; DAB+: 178.352 MHz
- Branding: Myanmar Radio International

Programming
- Format: News and entertainment

Ownership
- Owner: Myanmar Radio and Television

History
- First air date: 15 February 2021

Technical information
- Power: 2 kW

Myanmar Radio National Service (Burmese: မြန်မာ့အသံ; formerly, Burma Broadcasting Service (BBS)) is the national radio service of Myanmar. It has its broadcasting headquarters in both the administrative capital of Naypyidaw and Yangon, Myanmar's largest city. The service runs Myanmar Radio, Myanmar Radio Minorities Service, Myanmar Radio International and Myanmar Radio 2nd Programme (Tha Pyay Radio). Like all legally operating radio stations in Myanmar, such as Yangon City FM and Mandalay City FM, Myanmar Radio is under state management.

MRNS, alongside all other state-controlled media, has been the mouthpiece of successive Burmese governments. However, due to a recent revamp in giving greater air time to music and pop topics, the state-affiliated radio services are, despite their affiliation with the government, popular with the populace. However, in terms of audience for news programmes, MRNS is the least popular (and perceived as being the least credible). Most Burmese listen to foreign-based, pro-opposition radio services.

== History ==
Radio service in Myanmar first came on air in 1936 during the British colonial era. Regular programming by Bama Athan (Burmese: ဗမာ့အသံ; "Voice of Burma") began in 1946 when the British established Burma Broadcasting Service (BBS), carrying Burmese language national and foreign news and musical entertainment, knowledge reply and school lessons and English language news and music programming. After independence in 1948, it was named Myanma Athan (Burmese: မြန်မာ့အသံ; also meaning Voice of Burma, but with the more formal term "Myanmar").

The service was renamed Myanmar Radio by the military government which came to power in 1988. The radio service's parent, the Burmese Broadcasting Service was also renamed as Myanmar Radio and Television (MRTV) in 1997.

Until the launch of Yangon City FM in 2001, BBS/Myanmar Radio was the only radio station in the country. For years, its main broadcast center is at 426 Pyay Road in Kamayut in Yangon. Since late 2007, the main broadcast station has moved to Naypyidaw. Yangon Station now mostly relays Naypyidaw Station's programming.

== Broadcast service ==
Since the first high frequency (HF) installations back in the 1950s, the service's HF transmitter capacity has not had a major upgrade. However, there have been some minor frequency adjustments, with 4725 replacing the former 4795 and 5040, 7185 replacing 7125 and 7120, and 9730 replacing 9725 and 6035.

Station	Frequency	Wavelength	Location	Notes
Myanmar Radio National Service	594 kHz	505 meters	Naypyidaw (MW SW Transmitter Site, Tatkon)	2300–1630
Myanmar Radio National Service	576 kHz, 5985 KHz; 9730 KHz	520 meters 50.13 meters 30.85 meters	Yangon (Yay Kuu)	2300v-2400v, 2300–1630. Carries separate program 0030–0230, and at other times relays 594 kHz.
Myanmar Radio National Service	87.6 MHz	-	Yangon (Kamayout)	2300–1630
Myanmar Radio 2nd Programme (Tha Pyay Radio)	711 kHz	422 meters	Naypyidaw (MW SW Transmitter Site, Tatkon)	0030–1430
Myanmar Radio 2nd Programme (Tha Pyay Radio)	99.6 MHz	-	Yangon (Kamayout)	0030–1430
Myanmar Radio International	94.6 MHz	-	Yangon (Kamayout)	0030–1630
Myanmar Radio Minorities Service (Upper Tineyinthar)	5915 kHz	51 meters	Naypyidaw (MW SW Transmitter Site, Tatkon)	2330-0530 (Morning); 0630-1400 (Evening)
Myanmar Radio Minorities Service (Lower Tineyinthar)	729 KHz; 4725 kHz	411 meters 63 meters	Yangon (Yay Kuu)	2330-0530 (Morning); 0630-1230 (Evening)
Myanmar Radio Distance Learning	729 KHz; 4725 kHz	411 meters 63 meters	Yangon (Yay Kuu)	1230-1330/1530v

== Relay Station ==
Service	Frequency	Power	Transmitter location
Myanmar Radio National Service	FM 94.9 MHz	2 kW	Naypyidaw and Pyinmana.
Myanmar Radio National Service	FM 89.2 MHz	2 kW	MRTV Headquarters, Tatkon.
Myanmar Radio National Service	FM 87.6 MHz	2 kW	Yangon
Myanmar Radio National Service	FM 94.6 MHz	2 kW	Sagaing and Mandalay
Myanmar Radio National Service	FM 88.0 MHz	2 kW	Miytkyina
Myanmar Radio National Service	FM 88.0 MHz	2 kW	Bhamo
Myanmar Radio National Service	FM 89.2 MHz	2 kW	Homalin
Myanmar Radio National Service	FM 89.5 MHz	2 kW	Ken Balu
Myanmar Radio National Service	FM 90.4 MHz	2 kW	Falam and Kalay
Myanmar Radio National Service	FM 89.8 MHz	1 kW	Monywa
Myanmar Radio National Service	FM 94.6 MHz	2 kW	Sagaing and Mandalay
Myanmar Radio National Service	FM 88.3 MHz	1 kW	Pyin Oo Lwin
Myanmar Radio National Service	FM 94.3 MHz	2 kW	Popa
Myanmar Radio National Service	FM 88.0 MHz	2 kW	Meiktila
Myanmar Radio National Service	FM 89.8 MHz	2 kW	Sittwe
Myanmar Radio National Service	FM 88.9 MHz	2 kW	Taunggyi
Myanmar Radio National Service	FM 91.3 MHz	2 kW	Lahio
Myanmar Radio National Service	FM 88.3 MHz	2 kW	Keng Tung
Myanmar Radio National Service	FM 92.5 MHz	2 kW	Minbu and Magwe
Myanmar Radio National Service	FM 88.3 MHz	2 kW	Taungdwingyi
Myanmar Radio National Service	FM 89.5 MHz	2 kW	Pakokku
Myanmar Radio National Service	FM 92.5 MHz	2 kW	Pathein
Myanmar Radio National Service	FM 88.3 MHz	2 kW	Kyaunggon
Myanmar Radio National Service	FM 89.5 MHz	2 kW	Hinthada
Myanmar Radio National Service	FM 92.5 MHz	2 kW	Bago
Myanmar Radio National Service	FM 91.0 MHz	2 kW	Taungoo
Myanmar Radio National Service	FM 88.3 MHz	2 kW	Pyay
Myanmar Radio National Service	FM 89.2 MHz	2 kW	Hpa an
Myanmar Radio National Service	FM 89.0 MHz	2 kW	Myawady
Myanmar Radio National Service	FM 88.3 MHz	2 kW	Belin
Myanmar Radio National Service	FM 91.3 MHz	2 kW	Maylamyine
Myanmar Radio National Service	FM 88.3 MHz	1 kW	Dawei
Myanmar Radio National Service	FM 92.2 MHz	2 kW	Myeik
Myanmar Radio National Service	FM 88.0 MHz	1 kW	Kawthaung
Myanmar Radio International	FM 101.7 MHz	2 kW	Naypyidaw and Pyinmana
Myanmar Radio International	FM 99.0 MHz	2 kW	Sagaing and Mandalay
