= Mizzima TV =

Television station in Myanmar

Mizzima TV မဇ္ဈိမရုပ်သံလိုင်း
- Broadcast area: Myanmar
- Headquarters: Yangon

Programming
- Language: Burmese
- Picture format: 1080i HDTV (Downscaled to 16:9 480i for SD feed)

Ownership
- Owner: Mizzima Media Company Limited

History
- Launched: 24 March 2018; 7 years ago (Mizzima TV)

Links
- Website: www.mizzima.tv

Availability

Terrestrial
- Digital terrestrial television (Myanmar): Channel 18; RF Channel 68 850 MHz

Streaming media
- Mizzima TV App: Channel 1 (HD)

Mizzima TV (Burmese: မဇ္ဈိမရုပ်သံလိုင်း) is a Burmese digital free-to-air TV channel that run under MRTV's Multiplex Playout System based in Yangon, Myanmar. Mizzima TV is operated by Mizzima Media Co.ltd. They have signed a cooperation agreement with state-run Myanmar Radio and Television (MRTV) to operate as content providers for digital free-to-air TV channels in a multi-playout system of MRTV on 17 February 2018. Due to the 2021 military coup, television programming are cut off from MRTV Digital Multiplex.

== See also ==
- Television in Myanmar
