= Democratic Voice of Burma =

Independent media company founded by Burmese expatriates

DVB TV ဒီဗွီဘီရုပ်မြင်သံကြား
- Broadcast area: Myanmar
- Headquarters: Yangon

Programming
- Language: Burmese
- Picture format: 1080i HDTV

Ownership
- Owner: DVB Multimedia Group

History
- Launched: 28 May 2005; 21 years ago

Links
- Website: www.dvb.no

Availability

Terrestrial
- Digital terrestrial television (Myanmar): Channel 30; RF Channel 68 850 MHz

Democratic Voice of Burma (DVB) / DVB Multimedia Group
- Type: Broadcast radio and television
- Country: Burma
- Availability: National; International Burma
- Key people: Executive Director/Chief Editor Aye Chan Naing
- Launch date: July 1992 (radio) May 28, 2005 (television)
- Official website: www.dvb.no

The Democratic Voice of Burma (Burmese: ဒီမိုကရေတစ်မြန်မာ့အသံ, abbreviated DVB) is one of Myanmar's largest independent media organisations. DVB was founded as a non-profit media organization based in Oslo, Norway and Chiang Mai, Thailand. Run by Burmese expatriates, it made radio and television broadcasts aimed at providing uncensored news and information about Burma. From 2012, DVB had gradually moved back into Burma, where it became one of the country's largest and most well-respected TV broadcasters. Following the February 2021 coup, the organisation was banned by Burma's military dictatorship in March 2021 and moved back underground.

== History ==
In July 1992, DVB began broadcasting programming into Burma from studios in Oslo, Norway and transmitting via shortwave radio from the Norwegian Kvitsøy Tower transmitter. Now the broadcast is sent via satellite and free-to-air digital TV.

On 28 May 2005, DVB expanded its programming and began satellite television broadcasts into the country. The organization stated that it hoped to reach some ten million Burmese through this new effort (which it claims is the first free and independent Burmese language television channel), which was funded in part by non-governmental organizations such as Free Voice of the Netherlands, the National Endowment for Democracy, and the Freedom of Expression Foundation.

In 2012, DVB started multimedia operations inside Myanmar openly, running a branch office with its former underground VJs. On 24 March 2018, DVB started broadcasting on digital terrestrial television on MRTV DVB-T2 multiplex system.

After the 2021 Myanmar coup d'état, the Burmese military junta began systematically cracking down on freedom of speech within the country. On 8 March, DVB—along with four other networks (Myanmar Now, Mizzima News, Khit Thit Media, and 7Day News)—was banned by the junta. The arrests and torture of journalists is an ongoing theme of Burma's 2021 military coup. Thus far, five DVB staff have been detained or arrested following violent abductions carried out by the Burmese military.

In the first half of 2021, the police in Thailand arrested three journalists. They faced the charge of illegal entry into Thailand.

== Works ==
DVB's work has been used by international news networks. Myanmar's Military Ambitions, an exposé of the Burmese military's nuclear ambition, was broadcast by Al Jazeera in 2011. The PBS documentary Eyes of the Storm is an account of 2008's Cyclone Nargis, shot largely by DVB film makers. The Oscar-nominated documentary, Burma VJ, recounts the experiences of DVB reporters during Burma's 2007 Saffron Revolution.

== Mission ==
DVB states that it has four primary goals:

- the provision of "accurate and unbiased news to the people of Burma"
- to "promote understanding and cooperation" among Burma's religious and ethnic populations
- to "encourage and sustain independent public opinion" and to provide for "social and political debate"
- to "impart the ideals of democracy and human rights" to the Burmese people

== See also ==
- 2007 Burmese anti-government protests
- National Coalition Government of the Union of Burma
- Burma VJ
