= Myanmar Radio and Television =

Public broadcaster in Myanmar

Myanmar Radio and Television (MRTV) မြန်မာ့အသံနှင့်ရုပ်မြင်သံကြား
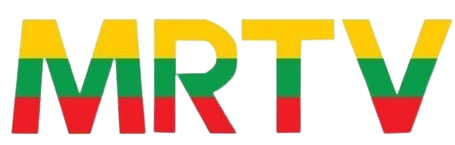
- Type: Government Department
- Country: Myanmar
- Headquarters: Kamayut, Yangon (Television); Naypyidaw (Radio)
- Owner: Ministry of Information
- Launch date: Radio: 15 February 1946; 80 years ago Television: Trial: June 1979; 47 years ago Official: 3 June 1980; 46 years ago
- Former names: Burma Broadcasting Service (1946–1991); Myanmar Television and Radio Department (1991–1997)
- Picture format: 2160p UHD; 1080i 16:9 HDTV
- Official website: www.mrtv.gov.mm

Myanmar Radio and Television (Burmese: မြန်မာ့အသံနှင့်ရုပ်မြင်သံကြား, abbreviated MRTV), formerly the Burma Broadcasting Service (BBS), is the parent of the state-run Myanmar Radio National Service and the MRTV television channel. The present state-run television channels broadcast from its broadcast center in Kamayut, Yangon while the radio service now broadcasts primarily from Naypyidaw. MRTV's television signals reach 92.7% of the Myanmar population, while its radio coverage reaches 100% of the country.

== History ==
=== Radio ===
Radio service in Myanmar first came on air in 1936 during the British colonial era. Regular programming by Bama Athan (Burmese: ဗမာ့အသံ; "Voice of Burma") began in February 1946 when the British established Burma Broadcasting Service (BBS). Then, the channel featured Burmese language national and foreign news and musical entertainment, knowledge reply and school lessons and English language news and music programming. After independence in 1948, it was named Myanma Athan (Burmese: မြန်မာ့အသံ; also meaning Voice of Burma, but with the more formal term "Myanmar"). The service was renamed Myanmar Radio by the military government which came to power in 1988. The junta has also renamed the radio service's parent, BBS as Myanmar Radio and Television (MRTV) in 1997.

Until the launch of Yangon City FM in 2001, BBS/Myanmar Radio was the only radio station in the country. For years, its main broadcast centre is at 426 Pyay Road in Kamayut in Yangon. Since late 2007, the main broadcast station has moved to Naypyidaw. Yangon Station now mostly relays Naypyidaw Station's programming.

=== Television ===
Television service in Myanmar was first introduced in June 1979 as a test trial in Yangon. MRTV was first launched on 3 June 1980, and regular television service was formally launched in 1981 using the NTSC standard. In 2005, MRTV had 195 television relay stations throughout the country. Color broadcasting began on 1 November 1980, using the NTSC system.

=== Expansion ===
In October 2013, MRTV started broadcasting on digital terrestrial with DVB-T2 System, same as most Asian Countries. 18 TV channels and 3 Myanmar Radio channels are on MRTV multiplex system. MRTV plans the news interface, to the modern style of starting sequences and will have well-decorated news room. The broadcasting hours also increased to 18 hours (previously 10 hours).

On 15 February 2015, MRTV adding 5 new TV channels to their Multplex Play Out system, such as MRTV-4, Channel 7, 5 Plus, MNTV and Channel 9.

On 24 March 2018, MRTV adding 5 new TV channels to their Multiplex Play out System, such as Mizzima TV, DVB TV, Channel K, YTV and Fortune TV.
Since 2014, Myanmar Radio has broadcast on FM radio from dozens of relay stations nationwide. It broadcasts 18 hours a day from 5:30 am to 11:30 pm (MMT).

== See also ==
- Myanmar International
- MRTV-4
- Television in Burma
- Media of Burma
- Myawaddy TV
