= Shwe Thanlwin =

Shwe Than Lwin Company
- Native name: ဘောမလုပ်ငန်းစု
- Type: Conglomerate
- Industry: Financial Services; Real Estate; Media; Education; Infrastructure
- Founded: January 1992; 34 years ago
- Headquarters: Botataung Township, Yangon, Myanmar
- Owner: U Kyaw Win
- Subsidiaries: SkyNet Media; Shwe Rural and Urban Development Bank; Shwe Trading; Shwe Thanlwin Highway Co Ltd
- Website: shwethanlwin.com/en/

Shwe Than Lwin Group (Burmese: ဘောမလုပ်ငန်းစု) Shwe Than Lwin Group is one of Myanmar's corporations with diverse business interests spanning financial services, media, real estate, education and infrastructure.

Founded in 1992 by U Kyaw Win.

Shwe Than Lwin is one of the few companies allowed to import coconut cooking oil and cement and agricultural projects in Irrawaddy division and is the sole distributor of tires from Thaton Tire Industry, which is under the Ministry of Industry (2). Following Cyclone Nargis, Shwe Thanlwin was one of the companies awarded contracts by the State Peace and Development Council for reconstruction work in the Ayeyarwady delta region, including low-cost homes for refugees. Shwe Thanlwin owns Sky Net, a satellite television channel, through Shwe Thanlwin Media, which was launched on 6 October 2010. Shwe Thanlwin also maintains the Bago-Nyaunglebin portion of the National Highway 1 (Burma).

In 2014, the Central Bank of Myanmar issued a license to Shwe Rural and Urban Development Bank, which is a subsidiary of Shwe Thanlwin.
