= GMM Z =

Subsidiary company in Thailand

GMM Z Company Limited
- Native name: บริษัท จีเอ็มเอ็มแซต จำกัด
- Formerly: 1-Sky
- Company type: Subsidiary
- Industry: Satellite television, Set-top box
- Founded: 1 April 2012; 13 years ago
- Headquarters: GMM Grammy Tower, Bangkok, Thailand
- Area served: Thailand
- Products: Set-top Box; Internet Box; Smart Plugs; CCTV Camera
- Brands: GMM Z
- Owner: GMM Grammy
- Website: www.gmmz.tv

GMM Z is a Thai set-top box distributor and former satellite television operator owned by GMM Grammy and Advanced Info Service.

Launched on 1 November 2011 as 1-Sky, It was operating as a KU band and C band set-top box distributor and Pay TV operator. It changed its name to GMM Z after receiving a notification from British Pay TV operator, BSkyB for the trademark conflict.

GMM Z is a subsidiary of GMM Grammy, a media-giant in Thailand. It was also has GMM B Company Limited, a subsidiary who operated Z PAY TV, a pay TV platform for GMM Z set-top boxes before sold it to CTH.

== History ==
=== 1-Sky ===
GMM 1-Sky launched on 1 November 2011 as a set-top box distributor and Pay TV operator. It was offering entertainment and sport channels such as Eurosport, MUTV and the Nick Jr. Channel.

=== GMM Z ===
In early 2012, 1-Sky has rebranded to GMM Z after received a notification from British Sky Broadcasting that 1-Sky was violating its trademark.

GMM Z has officially launched on 1 March 2012. It was offering with its flagship sport content "UEFA Euro 2012" with other sport content such as German Bundesliga, J-League 1 and French Ligue 1.

In early 2013, GMM Z acquired a deal with Fox International Channel to broadcast FIC's channels on its platform.

In August 2013, GMM Z launched new Z PAY TV packages separated into three packages including FIC's channels and its self-produced channels via the new Thaicom 6 satellite.

On 5 February 2014, GMM Z formed a content partnership with another pay TV operator, CTH, to launch a new package called "CTHZ Premier League+ HD" which included CTH Stadium channels who was airing Premier League.

In July 2014, GMM B, the operator of Z PAY TV and its content was acquired by CTH in exchange of CTH's 10% stake.

In January 2016, GMM B as a CTH subsidiary announced it will shut down Z PAY TV packages on GMM Z set-top boxes effecting 100,000 subscribers without informing to the National Broadcasting and Telecommunications Commission.

In March 2024, GMM Z has permanently stopped providing OTAs to SD set-top boxes.

GMM Z is now a producer and distributor for HD set-top boxes, internet box, radio receiver, smart plugs and cctv camera.
