= Intelsat 39 =

Geostationary communications satellite

- Names: IS-39
- Mission type: Communications
- Operator: Intelsat
- COSPAR ID: 2019-049B
- SATCAT no.: 44476
- Website: Intelsat 39
- Mission duration: 15 years (planned); Elapsed: 5 years, 8 months and 22 days

Spacecraft properties
- Spacecraft: Intelsat 39
- Bus: SSL 1300
- Manufacturer: Space Systems/Loral
- Launch mass: 6,600 kg (14,600 lb)

Start of mission
- Launch date: 6 August 2019, 19:30:07 UTC
- Rocket: Ariane 5 ECA (VA-249)
- Launch site: Centre Spatial Guyanais, ELA-3
- Contractor: Arianespace

Orbital parameters
- Reference system: Geocentric orbit
- Regime: Geostationary orbit
- Longitude: 62° East

Transponders
- Band: 128 transponders: 56 C-band; 72 Ku-band
- Coverage area: Asia, Africa, Europe

Intelsat 39, also known as IS-39, is a geostationary communications satellite operated by Intelsat and designed and manufactured by Space Systems/Loral (now subsidiary of Maxar Technologies) on the SSL 1300 satellite bus. It covers Asia, Africa, and Europe from the 62° East longitude. It has a mixed C-band and Ku-band.

== Launch ==
Intelsat 39 was launched on August 6, 2019, on an Ariane 5 launch vehicle from the Guiana Space Center in Kourou, French Guiana, along with EDRS-C/HYLAS-3. From there, the satellite achieved its geostationary orbit by firing its main engine and was positioned at its position at 62° East, replacing Intelsat 902.

Launch of Intelsat 39.

== Specifications ==
Intelsat announced in May 2016 that they had commissioned the satellite manufacturer Space Systems/Loral to produce a modern communications satellite for their fleet. It has powerful C-band and Ku-band transponders, a projected lifespan of more than 15 years and is powered by two solar panels and batteries. It is also three-axis stabilized and weighs around 6,600 kilograms (14,600 pounds). For propulsion, the satellite has both chemical and electric thrusters, using only electric propulsion for in-orbit attitude control.
