= Canal+ (Myanmar) =

Burmese multichannel television service

Canal+ Myanmar
- Trade name: Canal+
- Native name: Canal+
- Genre: 3214
- Founded: 2006; 20 years ago (as 4TV)
- Headquarters: Parkside One Building, 271/273 Bagayar Street, Sanchaung Township, Yangon, Myanmar
- Number of locations: (2021)
- Parent: Canal+ Group; Forever Group
- Website: www.canalplus-myanmar.com

Canal+ (current Forever Group in Myanmar and Canal+ S.A.. Originally launched by Forever Group alone, Canal+ Group joined in the business in 2017, and the service adopted the current name in April 2021.

Canal+ delivers the service through the digital terrestrial television (DTT) signals (available in Yangon and Mandalay) and direct-to-home (DTH) satellite television signals (beamed through Thaicom 6). It launched a Burmese version of My Canal OTT television service in 2019.

There are 80 television channels, including nine in-house television channels, available on the platform. After February 2021, some of the international broadcasting channels were closed, including news channels like CNN and BBC, during the 2021 Myanmar coup d'état. As of October 1, 2022, the total number of channels is now 69.

Previous logo as MRTV-4 International

== History ==
The Forever Group added a package of international channels to the digital MRTV-4 service known as MRTV-4 International in 2006; the launch of these channels caused its popularity to increase, with the UBC decoders decreasing their sales in tandem. The Thai-based Irrawaddy newspaper reported in August that MRTV-4 International would also start broadcasting on satellite; Forever had attained an additional agreement with CCTV-9 for further foreign programming.

Canal+ launched two sports channels on 16 February 2022.

== Channels ==
=== Originals ===
- Canal+ Kyi Lite: a TV Guide Channel.
- Canal+ Action: an action film channel.
- Canal+ Pu Tu Tue: a channel targeting preschoolers.
- Canal+ Sports 1: a sports channel.
- Canal+ Sports 2: a sports channel.
- Canal+ Sports 3: a sports channel.
- Canal+ Cha Tate: a channel targeting children and teenagers.
- Canal+ Mae Madi: a drama channel aimed at female audiences.
- Canal+ Zat Lenn: a film channel.

== TV series broadcast on Canal+ Zat Lenn ==
(2018)

- Toxic season 1 (အဆိပ်သွေး အတွဲ ၁)
- Myanmar The Incredible Journeys season 1 (မြန်မာသို့ အံ့ဖွယ် ခရီးစဉ် အတွဲ ၁)
- Traveller's Note season 1 (ခရီးသွားကောက်ကြောင်း အတွဲ ၁)
- Traveller's Note season 2 (ခရီးသွားကောက်ကြောင်း အတွဲ ၂)
- New Page season 1 (စာမျက်နှာသစ် အတွဲ ၁)

(2019)

- Traveller's Note season 3 (ခရီးသွားကောက်ကြောင်း အတွဲ ၃)
- Traveller's Note season 4 (ခရီးသွားမှတ်တမ်း အတွဲ ၄)
- Traveller's Note season 5 (ခရီးသွားကောက်ကြောင်း အတွဲ ၅)
- Traveller's Note season 6 (ခရီးသွားကောက်ကြောင်း အတွဲ ၆)
- Traveller's Note season 7 (ခရီးသွားကောက်ကြောင်း အတွဲ ၇)
- Traveller's Note season 8 (ခရီးသွားကောက်ကြောင်း အတွဲ ၈)
- Toxic season 2 (အဆိပ်သွေး အတွဲ ၂)
- New Page season 2 (စာမျက်နှာသစ် အတွဲ ၂)
- Spirit of Fight season 1 (လောကကြိုးဝိုင်း အတွဲ ၁)
- Mingalar Village season 1 (မင်္ဂလာရွာ အတွဲ ၁)
- Lake Pyar season 1 (လိပ်ပြာ အတွဲ ၁)

(2020)

- Mingalar Village season 2 (မင်္ဂလာရွာ အတွဲ ၂)
- Spirit of Fight season 2 (လောကကြိုးဝိုင်း အတွဲ ၂)
- Mingalar Village season 3 (မင်္ဂလာရွာ အတွဲ ၃)

(2021)

- Lake Pyar season 2 (လိပ်ပြာ အတွဲ ၂)

(2022)

- Mission Chefs (သဘာဝရဲ့ဟင်းတစ်မယ်)
- Colourful Dreams (ရောင်စုံခြယ် အိပ်မက်များ)
- Trapped (ဗလာစာအုပ်)
- Brew Me a Favor (ချိုခါးဆိမ့်သက် အချစ်တစ်ခွက်)
- Crying Forest (အိပ်မက်ငိုတော)

(2023)

- An Ugly & Seven Handsomes (မောင်မောင်တို့ရဲ့မောင်မောင်)
- The Matches (မီးခြစ်ဆံပုံပြင်)
- Oh My Family! (တစ်ယောက်တစ်ပေါက်တစ်မိုးအောက်)
- Cumulus of Dark Souls (ရမ္မက်တိမ်တောင်)
- Nint (နင့်)
- Sparkle Hearts (ရင်ထဲကြွေတဲ့ကြယ်)

(2024)

- Ar Pay Too And Jalebi (အာပေတူးနဲ့ဂျလေဘီ)
- The Return (ခေါင်မိုးမဲ့အိမ်)
- Taw Win Sar (တောဝင်စား)
- Scary Hunters (ကြောက်သလားမမေးနဲ့)
- A Vague Dream (မသဲကွဲသောအိပ်မက်)
- Nwe (နွယ်)

(2025)

- Loon (လွန်း)
- Love Equation (အချစ်ညီမျှခြင်း)
- The Emerald Heir (မြ)
- Born To Be One (အရှုံးမဲ့အနိုင်)
- Kan Sett Kan (ကံဆက်ကန်)

(2026)

- Saturday's Treasure (စနေရတနာ)
- Till The Last Raindrop (မိုးကြွေတဲ့ဆောင်း)
- A Swel Kon Yak (အစွဲကွန်ရက်)
- Mar Yar: The Second Face (မာယာနှစ်မျက်နှာ)
- Chit Thaw Mahaythi (ချစ်သောမဟေသီ)

== Sports competitions broadcast on Canal+ Sports ==
- Premier League (2025-present)
- UEFA Champions League (2022-present)
- AFC Champions League Elite (2021-present)
- Ultimate Fighting Championship (2022-present)
- Professional Fighters League (2024-present)
- Formula One (2022-present)
- LIV Golf (2023-present)
- The Great Lethwei (2022-present)
- ONE Championship (2026-present)
- La Liga (2023-2024)
