= Thaicom 6 =

Thai satellite

THAICOM 6
- Mission logo of THAICOM 6
- Mission type: Communication
- Operator: Thaicom
- COSPAR ID: 2014-002A
- SATCAT no.: 39500
- Mission duration: 15 years

Spacecraft properties
- Bus: GEOStar-2
- Manufacturer: Orbital Sciences Corporation
- Launch mass: 3,325 kg (7,330 lb)
- Power: 3.7 kW (5.0 hp)

Start of mission
- Launch date: January 6, 2014, 22:06 UTC
- Rocket: Falcon 9 v1.1
- Launch site: Cape Canaveral SLC-40
- Contractor: SpaceX

Orbital parameters
- Reference system: Geocentric
- Regime: Geostationary
- Longitude: 78.5° East
- Perigee altitude: 35,789 kilometres (22,238 mi)
- Apogee altitude: 35,795 kilometres (22,242 mi)
- Inclination: 0.07 degrees
- Period: 1436.07 minutes
- Epoch: 25 January 2015, 02:13:56 UTC

Transponders
- Band: 18 C band 8 K_{u} band
- Frequency: 72, 36 MHz C band 54, 36 MHz K_{u} band
- Coverage area: Southeast Asia, Africa & Americas

THAICOM 6 (Thai: ไทยคม 6) is a Thai satellite of the Thaicom series, operated by Thaicom Public Company Limited, a subsidiary of INTOUCH headquartered in Bangkok, Thailand. THAICOM 6 is colocated with Thaicom 5 at 78.5 degrees East, in geostationary orbit. The total cost for the satellite is US$160 million.

== Overview ==
THAICOM 6 is a 3-axis stabilized spacecraft, carrying 18 active C-band transponders and 8 active Ku-band transponders. The Ku-band transponders are both addressed as well as beam-switched to broadband. THAICOM 6 provides communication service to Southeast Asia, Africa and Madagascar with its primary role being DTH service for Thailand.

== Launch ==
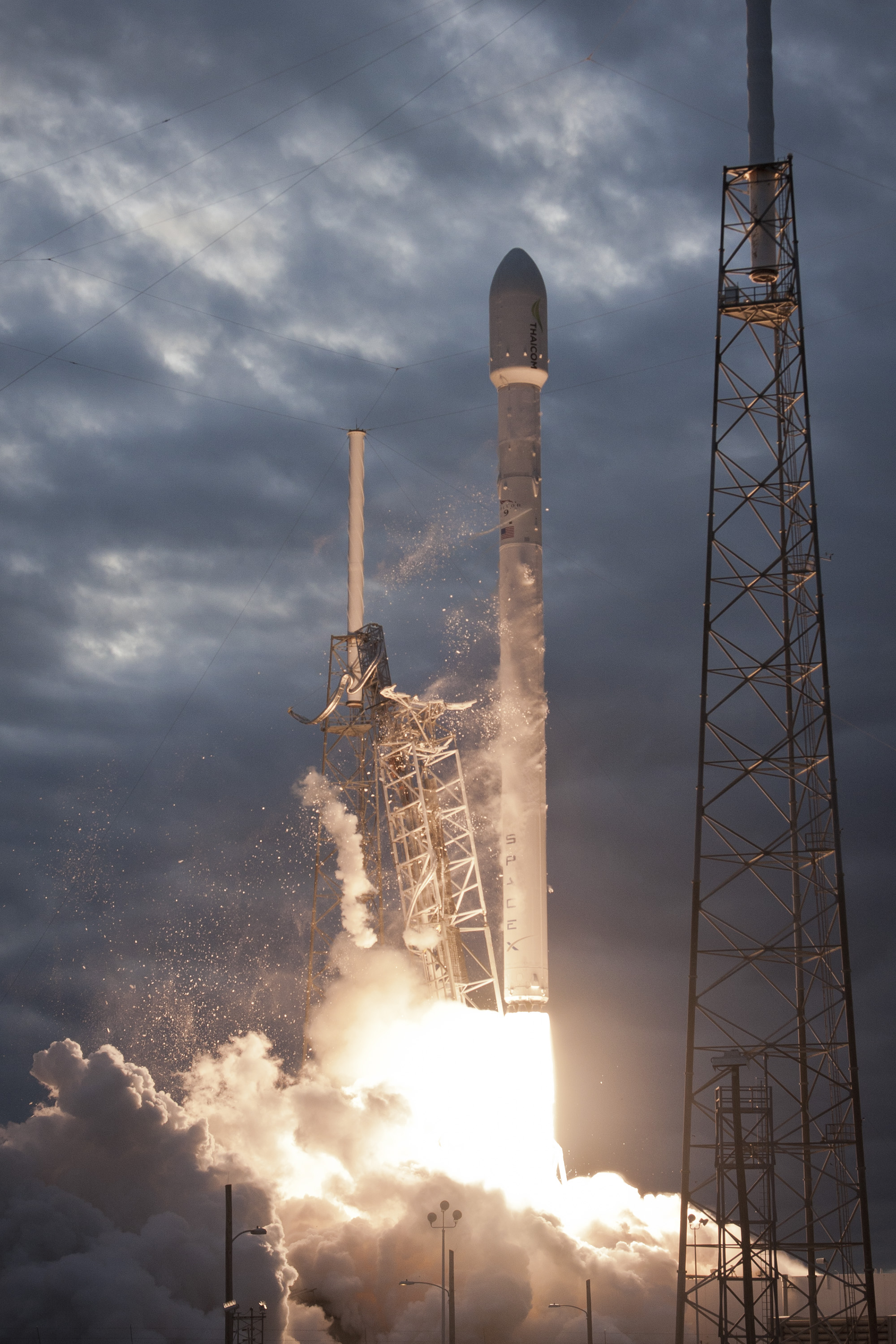
THAICOM 6 launching on a Falcon 9 v1.1 vehicle.

The spacecraft was launched on 6 January 2014, by SpaceX on a Falcon 9 v1.1 launch vehicle. The payload was delivered by SpaceX to a 90,000 kilometers (56,000 mi)-apogee supersynchronous elliptical transfer orbit that will later be reduced by the satellite builder Orbital Sciences Corporation to an approximately 35,800 kilometers (22,200 mi) circular geostationary orbit. The supersynchronous transfer orbit enables an inclination plane change with a lower expenditure of propellant by the satellite's kick motor.`

This launch was SpaceX's second transport of a payload to a Geostationary transfer orbit. Both the SES-8 SpaceX launch before this one and THAICOM 6 utilized a supersynchronous transfer orbit, but Thaicom 6 was at a somewhat greater apogee than that used for SES-8.

The Falcon 9 upper stage used to launch THAICOM 6 was left in a decaying elliptical low-Earth orbit which decayed over time and, on 28 May 2014, re-entered the atmosphere and burned up.

== See also ==
- Thaicom 4
- Thaicom 5
- Thaicom 7
- Thaicom 8
- Thaicom 9A
- List of Falcon 9 launches
