= Family Fortunes =

British TV game show (1980–2002, 2020–2023)

- Genre: Game show
- Based on: Family Feud by Mark Goodson
- Presented by: Bob Monkhouse; Max Bygraves; Les Dennis; Andy Collins; Gino D'Acampo
- Announcer: Andrew Lodge; Stephen Rhodes; Peter Dickson; Roger Tilling; Penny Layden
- Theme music composer: Jack Parnell and David Lindup (1980–1985); Mike Alexander (1987–2002); Marc Sylvan (2020–2023)
- Country of origin: United Kingdom
- Original language: English
- No. of series: 22 (original); 3 (1 unaired, revival)
- No. of episodes: 575 (14 unaired, original); 40 (10 unaired, revival)

Production
- Production locations: ATV Elstree (1980–1983); Central House (1984–1989); Television House (1990–2002); Television Centre, London (2020); The Maidstone Studios (2021)
- Running time: 30 minutes (inc. adverts, 1980–2002); 60 minutes (inc. adverts, 2020–2023)
- Production companies: ATV in association with Talbot Television and Goodson-Todman Productions (1980–1981); Central in association with Talbot Television and Goodson-Todman Productions (1982–1998); Carlton in association with Grundy (Pearson Television) (1999–2002); Thames (2020–2023)

Original release
- Network: ITV
- Release: 6 January 1980 – 6 December 2002
- Release: 20 September 2020 – 4 June 2023

Related
- Family Feud

Family Fortunes is a British television game show based on the American game show Family Feud. The programme ran on ITV from 6 January 1980 to 6 December 2002. A celebrity version, All Star Family Fortunes, followed from 2006 to 2015.

In 2020, the original version of the show returned after 17 years with Gino D'Acampo as host which ran until 2023. A third series of 10 episodes was planned for broadcast but was shelved in February 2025 following sexual misconduct allegations aimed towards D'Acampo on other ITV shows.

The game involves two families each consisting of five members providing answers to 'everyday questions' that were surveyed by 100 members of the British public before the show to win prizes (mainly cash). The top answers to the surveys are displayed on a large electronic board, christened by Bob Monkhouse as "Mr. Babbage".

Monkhouse was responsible for changing the name of the show to Family Fortunes as he felt that "feud" sounded too aggressive.

== Hosts and presentation ==
At first produced by ATV for ITV, Family Fortunes was first hosted by comedian Bob Monkhouse (1980–83), followed by singer and entertainer Max Bygraves (1983–85). The show returned on 27 June 1987 with Les Dennis as presenter and remained on air for the next 15 years. It was then moved to a daily daytime slot, hosted by Andy Collins.

The most well-known aspects of the show are the large computer screen (named "Mr Babbage" by original host Bob Monkhouse) and the famous computerised sound used when wrong answers are given. The computer screen name, "Mr Babbage", was in recognition of the English mathematician, philosopher, inventor and mechanical engineer Charles Babbage, who originated the concept of a programmable computer. During the Monkhouse and Bygraves era, the board was also used to show the closing credits at the end of the episode. In 1987, a completely different board was used for the first Dennis series, however a board similar to the original Mr Babbage one was used from the following year until its end in 2002. Both the All-Star and 2020 versions use a video wall for the board.

== Format ==
Two family teams, each consisting of five members, are asked to guess the results of surveys in which 100 people would be asked open-ended questions (e.g., "We asked 100 people to name any animal that lives wild in the United Kingdom" or "We asked 100 people to name a food you smell to be sure it's fresh"). Although rarely acknowledged during the programme, the 100 people surveyed are invariably audience members who have volunteered before the show or the families themselves who would be asked questions for the next series.

Each round begins with a member of each family (in rotation, meaning all players do this at least once) approaching the podium. As the question is read, the first of the two nominees to hit the buzzer gives an answer. If it is not the most popular answer, the other nominee is asked. If both nominees fail to give an answer that is on the board, the next members of each family are chosen to answer the question, starting in the same order as the first two nominees. The family with the more popular answer then chooses whether to "play" the question or "pass" control to the other family.

The host then passes down the line of the controlling team, asking for an answer from each member. After each answer, the board reveals whether it features. If not, or if they can't come up with an answer in time, the family loses a life; the family loses control of the board if they lose three lives in the round. If a family manages to come up with all the survey answers before losing three lives, they win the amount in pounds of the total number of people who had given the answers. Losing a life is marked with an X on the board accompanied by a buzzer.

If a family loses all three lives, the opponent is given the chance to "steal" by giving one of the correct missing answers. Only the head family member may give the answer after consulting the family. If the answer is present, this family wins the round and is said to have "stolen" the money. Otherwise, the family that played the board keeps the money.

On celebrity specials, each top answer adds a bonus of £200 (later £250) to that family's charity.

=== Double Money ===
Following three rounds before a commercial break (two rounds in series 1), "Double Money" is played. Gameplay is the same as in the first rounds, but each answer is now worth £2 for each person who said it, and there are generally fewer possible answers. The family who passed £300 (£200 in series 1) first goes through to play "Big Money" (known in some overseas versions as "Fast Money") for the jackpot. On the 2020 revival, the fifth and sixth questions score double points (for the sixth question, each family nominates one person to answer the question from the podium) and the losing family receives £2 per point and a "Family Fortunes buzzer" doorbell. The winning family would be guaranteed ten times their winning score.

=== Big Money ===
This involves two contestants (out of the five in the family team) answering five questions that fit with those given by the 100 people surveyed each within a narrow time limit. The first contestant answers the five questions within 15 seconds (20 in the 2020 revival). Then the second contestant (who was out of earshot) answers within 20 seconds (25 in the 2020 revival), the extra time being to allow for the likelihood of them repeating the first contestant's answer. If this happens, they are asked for another one. Each point gives the family £2 (£10 per point in the revival), up to £398 (£1,990 in the revival), and those points would be added to their earlier winnings. If they get 200 points or more from the ten answers, they then win the top cash prize.

From 1994 onwards, a bonus star prize was available for naming all five "top" (most popular) answers and scoring 200 points. The star prize couldn't be won if they failed to score at least 200 points even if all five top answers had been named.

In the 2020 revival, the top answers were not revealed until after the second contestant gave their answers and their point values were shown, an element that was previously seen in the All-Stars version of the show.

== Cash and prizes ==
The top cash prize in "Big Money" during the first series (1980) was £1,000. From the second series (1981), the prize started at £1,000, then rose by £500 weekly if no one won, to a limit of £3,000 (£2,500 from 1981 to 1982), which it could stay at for more than one week if it still was not won. Once the prize was won, it reverted to £1,000 for the next edition. In the 1987 series, it started at £1,000 and, if not won, rose by £1,000 per week to a maximum of £3,000. From the 1988 series, the prize was fixed at £3,000. After the abolition of the IBA's prize limits, the top prize rose to £5,000 from 1996. The money had to be shared out between contestants.

The bonus star prize was always a family car between 1994 and 1998. From 1998 to 2002, contestants had the choice of either a car or a holiday for up to twelve people. The car suppliers were Honda in 1994, SEAT in 1995 and Daewoo between 1996 and 2002. On the all-star specials, 200 points along with all five top responses donated £5,000 to both teams.

During the programme's brief daytime run in 2002, the prize values were reduced significantly. If the contestants scored over 200 points, they won £1,000 and if they found five top answers, it was increased to £3,000. As with the previous prizes, the £3,000 could only be won if the family scored 200+ points.

In the 2020 revival, the top cash prize is £10,000, which would be tripled to £30,000 if one or both contestants named all of the top answers.

From the second series in 1981 onward, spot prizes were available in the main game, turning up seemingly at random when certain answers were found. These ranged from household appliances like washing machines, vacuum cleaners and toasters, to home entertainment goods such as televisions, video cassette recorders and camcorders. During the two series hosted by Bygraves, if a contestant won a music prize such as a record player, he would usually throw in one of his own LP's as a bonus. In later series, when prize limits were lifted, some of the spot prizes on offer included short weekend breaks away or shopping vouchers.

== Transmissions ==
=== Original ===
Series	Start date	End date	Episodes	Recorded	Presenter
1	6 January 1980	13 July 1980	26	1979–1980	Bob Monkhouse
2	9 January 1981	11 July 1981	26	1980	Bob Monkhouse
3	12 December 1981	4 September 1982	30	1981	Bob Monkhouse
4	31 December 1982	24 June 1983	26	1982–1983	Bob Monkhouse
5	14 October 1983	8 April 1984	24	1983	Max Bygraves
6	18 January 1985	31 May 1985	18	1984	Max Bygraves
7	27 June 1987	29 August 1987	26	1987	Les Dennis
7	10 April 1988	31 July 1988	26	1987	Les Dennis
8	23 September 1988	16 December 1988	26	1988	Les Dennis
8	9 April 1989	2 July 1989	26	1988	Les Dennis
9	1 September 1989	22 December 1989	17	1989	Les Dennis
10	31 August 1990	28 December 1990	18	1990	Les Dennis
11	29 November 1991	18 April 1992	20	1991	Les Dennis
12	10 July 1992	1 January 1993	21	1992	Les Dennis
13	10 September 1993	31 December 1993	17	1993	Les Dennis
14	1 October 1994	15 April 1995	22	1994	Les Dennis
15	1 September 1995	26 January 1996	22	1995	Les Dennis
16	31 August 1996	8 March 1997	26	1996	Les Dennis
17	13 September 1997 (Note: The seventeenth series was scheduled to debut on 6 September 1997, but was postponed to the following week due to program changes following the funeral of Diana, Princess of Wales.)	21 February 1998	21	1997	Les Dennis
18	31 August 1998	25 June 1999	26	1998	Les Dennis
19	25 September 1999	11 July 2000	26	1999	Les Dennis
20	16 September 2000	13 January 2002	24	2000	Les Dennis
21	20 January 2002	31 August 2002	10 (Note: Twenty-four episodes were recorded for Series 21, but ITV only aired the first ten episodes within the schedule. The remaining fourteen episodes were not transmitted until Challenge started broadcasting this series.)	2001	Les Dennis
22	2 September 2002	6 December 2002	70	2002	Andy Collins

=== Revival ===
Series	Start date	End date	Episodes	Recorded	Presenter
1	20 September 2020	3 January 2021	10	2020	Gino D'Acampo
2	12 September 2021	27 December 2021	20	2021	Gino D'Acampo
2	23 October 2022	20 November 2022	20	2021	Gino D'Acampo
2	16 April 2023	4 June 2023	20	2021	Gino D'Acampo

=== Ratings ===
==== Series 18 ====
Episode no.	Air date	Viewers (millions)	ITV weekly ranking
1	31 August 1998	—N/a	—N/a
2	7 September 1998	—N/a	—N/a
3	21 September 1998	5.95	28
4	28 September 1998	6.47	29
5	3 October 1998	7.05	23
6	10 October 1998	7.17	25
7	17 October 1998	7.08	27
8	24 October 1998	7.38	29
9	31 October 1998	7.30	29
10	7 November 1998	7.34	27
11	28 November 1998	7.54	27
12	5 December 1998	8.23	26
13	12 December 1998	7.27	27
14	19 December 1998	7.20	29
15	23 January 1999	7.47	25
16	30 January 1999	7.71	29
17	6 February 1999	7.70	30
18	13 February 1999	7.87	30
19	20 February 1999	7.52	25
20	27 February 1999	8.04	25
21	11 May 1999	7.87	18
22	24 May 1999	7.97	13
23	31 May 1999	6.40	25
24	11 June 1999	—N/a	—N/a
25	18 June 1999	6.17	21
26	25 June 1999	5.40	27

==== Series 20 ====
Episode no.	Air date	Viewers (millions)	ITV weekly ranking
1	16 September 2000	6.23	23
2	23 September 2000	6.41	24
3	30 September 2000	6.24	26
4	7 October 2000	6.67	25
5	14 October 2000	6.88	27
6	20 November 2000	8.50	19
7	23 December 2000	6.64	26
8	30 December 2000	7.17	24
9	1 January 2001	9.70	16
10	15 March 2001	7.93	21
11	10 May 2001	6.47	16
12	17 May 2001	7.35	15
13	13 July 2001	5.93	24
14	20 July 2001	6.58	18
15	27 July 2001	5.99	14
16	3 August 2001	6.31	14
17	9 August 2001	—N/a	—N/a
18	21 August 2001	6.26	13
19	8 September 2001	—N/a	—N/a
20	15 September 2001	—N/a	—N/a
21	22 September 2001	—N/a	—N/a
22	29 September 2001	—N/a	—N/a
23	27 December 2001	—N/a	—N/a
24	13 January 2002	—N/a	—N/a

== All Star Family Fortunes ==
All Star Family Fortunes
- Genre: Game show
- Presented by: Vernon Kay
- Theme music composer: Ash Alexander; Simon Darlow
- Country of origin: United Kingdom
- Original language: English
- No. of series: 11
- No. of episodes: 126 (inc. 1 special)

Production
- Production locations: The London Studios (2006-15)
- Running time: 45 minutes (2006–2010, 2013–2014); 60 minutes (2011–2012, 2015)
- Production companies: Talkback Thames (2006–2011); Thames (2012–2015)

Original release
- Network: ITV
- Release: 28 October 2006 – 14 June 2015

A celebrity revival of the show presented by Vernon Kay began airing on 28 October 2006 and ended on 14 June 2015 after its eleventh series.

=== Format ===
In this version, the game ends after four rounds (five during the hour-long series with two or three Single and two Double), ignoring the 'first to 300 points' rule that the previous incarnations employed, and the losing family receives a consolation prize of the greater of £1,000 or £10 times their score (£3 per point in series 1). Also in Big Money, the celebrity automatically plays the final, meaning that only one other member needs to be picked. If they get 200 points or more from the ten answers, they win £10,000 for their chosen charity, which would be tripled if they get all five top answers, and if they score less than 200 points, those points plus their earlier score would be multiplied by £10 (£3 per point in series 1).

=== Transmissions ===
Series	Start date	End date	Episodes
1	28 October 2006	23 December 2006	8
2	27 October 2007	5 January 2008	10
3	13 September 2008	17 January 2009	13
4	20 September 2009	27 February 2010	17
5	11 September 2010	25 December 2010	15
6	20 August 2011	25 December 2011	11
7	11 February 2012	27 December 2012	15
8	6 January 2013	3 March 2013	9
9	29 June 2013	3 August 2013	6
10	28 December 2013	2 March 2014	10
11	28 December 2014	14 June 2015	11

=== International versions ===
Country	Local name	Host	Network	Air date
Australia	All Star Family Feud	Grant Denyer	Network Ten	2016–2018
Belgium	Familieraad (2014)	Chris Van den Durpel	vtm	2014
Germany	Familien-Duell - Prominenten-Special	Daniel Hartwich	RTL	2013
Ghana	Family Feud Ghana	Steve Harvey	TV3	2020–present
Indonesia	New Famili 100	Tukul Arwana	Indosiar	2013
South Africa	Family Feud South Africa	Steve Harvey	e.tv	2020–present
United States	Celebrity Family Feud	Al Roker	NBC	2008
United States	Celebrity Family Feud	Steve Harvey	ABC	2015–present
United States	¿Qué dicen los famosos?	Rodrigo Vidal	Telemundo	2022–present

==== Similar elements to All Star Family Fortunes ====
Country	Local name	Host	Network	Air date
Bangladesh	Family Feud	Tahsan Rahman Khan	NTV; Bongo	2025–present
Cambodia	Family Feud Cambodia	Pen Chamrong	PNN	2019–2021
Greece	Fast Money!	Markos Seferlis	ANT1	2012
Greece	Άκου Τι Είπαν! Βραδιάτικα	Christos Ferentinos	Alpha TV	2014–2016
Greece	Άκου Τι Είπαν!	Christos Ferentinos	Alpha TV	2014–2016
India	Family Fortunes	RJ Mantra	Big Magic	2015–2016
Indonesia	Super Family	Darius Sinathrya	antv	2009–2011
Indonesia	New Famili 100	Tukul Arwana	Indosiar	2013–2015
Ireland	Alan Hughes' Family Fortunes	Alan Hughes	TV3	2012–2014
Myanmar	မိသားစုပြိုင်ပွဲ	Kaung Htet Zaw	Channel 7	2016–2022
Peru	100 peruanos dicen	Bruno Pinasco	América Televisión	2013
Philippines	Family Feud	Richard Gomez; Dingdong Dantes	GMA Network	2008–2010
Philippines	Family Feud	Luis Manzano	ABS-CBN	2016–2017
Turkey	Birimiz Hepimiz Için	Mehmet Ali Erbil	Star TV	2009
Turkey	Aileler Yarişiyor	Ufuk Özkan	TRT 1	2012–2014
Ukraine	Просто шоу	Yuriy Horbunov	1+1	2013
