= MasterChef Myanmar season 4 =

Fourth season of MasterChef Myanmar

MasterChef All Stars Myanmar
- Season 4
- Promotional poster for season 4, featuring (L to R) Daw Phyu Phyu Tin, U Ye Htut Win, Joseph and Thazin Nwe Win
- Judges: U Ye Htut Win; Daw Phyu Phyu Tin; Joseph
- No. of contestants: 13
- Winner: Hein Htet Aung
- Runner-up: Min Khant Maw

Release
- Original network: MRTV-4
- Original release: 6 November 2022 – 19 March 2023

Season chronology
- ← Previous; Season 3

The fourth season of Burmese competitive reality television cooking show MasterChef Myanmar or MasterChef All Stars Myanmar premiered on MRTV-4, on 6 November 2022, and concluded on 19 March 2023. The host of this season was Thazin Nwe Win and the judges were U Ye Htut Win, Daw Phyu Phyu Tin and Joseph joined as a new judge. The season was won by Hein Htet Aung, with Min Khant Maw finishing as a runner-up.

== Contestants ==
Contestant	Age	Home town	Previous Season	Previous Season Placing	Status
Hein Htet Aung	31	Kalay	3	8th	Winner 19 March 2023 episode 20
Min Khant Maw	25	Yangon	3	6th	Runner-up 19 March 2023 episode 20
Nay Aung	30	Shwebo	2	2nd	Eliminated 12 March 2023 episode 19
Nan Htike Oo	32	Meiktila	3	5th	Eliminated 5 March 2023 episode 18
Ko Sai	31	Namtu	3	7th	Eliminated 26 February 2023 episode 17
Kaung Kin Htet	26	Yangon	2	8th	Eliminated 19 February 2023 episode 16
Aye Thazin	51	Yangon	2	6th	Eliminated 19 February 2023 episode 16; Returned 5 February 2023 episode 14; Eliminated 22 January 2023 episode 12
Htet Myat Oo	27	Wundwin	1	10th	Eliminated 12 February 2023 episode 15
Shoon Shoon Aung	29	Yangon	2	3rd	Eliminated 12 February 2023 episode 15; Returned 5 February 2023 episode 14; Eliminated 25 December 2022 episode 8
Lwin Lwin Kyu	42	Pyay	3	15th	Eliminated 29 January 2023 episode 13
Ning Rang Roi San	26	Yangon	3	11th	Eliminated 8 January 2023 episode 10
Phoe Wa Aung	23	Yangon	2	12th	Eliminated 1 January 2023 episode 9
Htain Lin Maung	32	Dawei	1	14th	Eliminated 4 December 2022 episode 5
