= Family Feud Myanmar =

Burmese television program

- Burmese: မိသားစုပြိုင်ပွဲ
- Genre: Game show
- Presented by: Kaung Htet Zaw
- Theme music composer: Kaung Htet Zaw
- Country of origin: Myanmar
- Original language: Burmese

Production
- Production location: Yangon
- Running time: 40 minutes every saturdays and sundays at 14:00 (MMT)
- Production company: Forever Group

Original release
- Network: Channel 7
- Release: 30 January 2016 – present

Related
- Family Feud; Family Feud Canada; Celebrity Family Feud

Family Feud Myanmar (Burmese: မိသားစုပြိုင်ပွဲ) is a Burmese game show presented by Kaung Htet Zaw where two families compete to name the most popular responses to survey questions in order to win cash and prizes. It is based on American game show Family Feud with the aesthetics sharing in common with the British version. It has been airing on Channel 7 since 2016.

== Game format ==
Four contestants from two families compete for money and prizes. Each turn begins with an active “face-to-face” question between two opposing competitors. Host asked a survey of 100 people previously. Some of the ratings are popularly covered by the survey's response to the board. Contestant of the first click of a buzz-in will answer first and contestant will not answer, or if the answer will not be the most answered, the other contestant is opportunity to win the higher answer. The winning family can choose to answer the question themselves or give it to try for their opposite competitors. Then the family that answers the question must try to win by predicting all the remaining hidden answers. If they fail three times without giving a response or without responding within three seconds, their opponents are once again given the opportunity to "steal" points by guessing the remaining hidden answers. If competitors have the opportunity to "steal" points, the question must be answered only by their team leader. The captain of the team is the final decision. Tell us what the answer is. The remaining hidden answers were revealed on an unreleased board.

Although one family can control a question, members do not allow discussion of possible answers. Each person must respond individually. However, the opposing family can make preparations for the "steal" team, and their captain must respond when such effort is made.

In the survey of 100 fans, only the answer will be true. If you can answer all of the questions, you will get all the points. On the answer board, the number of answers is reduced and the game is doubled or tripled as the game progresses. The family with the most points wins the family contest through the two single points questions have 8 answers and 7 answer, two double points questions have 6 answers and 5 answers, a triple point question has 3 answers and the answer can be failed only one time. The first family that reaches the point of 300 can win the game early. The family must continue to compete in Big Money.

=== Big Money ===
The two winning family members play Big Money for a cash bonus opportunity. One contestant has to start the procession and the other has to wait for the headset to hear the first one answer. There are five questions that need to be answered quickly and there is a time limit for them to answer. The time begins after the first question. If the contestant has difficulty answering, he or she can skip the other question and can re-answer passed question if time is left.

The first contestant will receive a total of five questions that can be answered after or over time. The second contestant was issued an answer to these five questions. Both compete in the same rules, but the five-second time limit is extended to the next contestants (the first 25, the extension 30); Also, if the second contestant copies the first answer, there is a loud noise and he has to answer again. Depending on the total score of the two contestants, a score of 1,000 ks. per point is awarded. Five-time champion will be retired and the two other groups will be entered.
