= MasterChef Myanmar season 3 =

Third season of MasterChef Myanmar

MasterChef Myanmar
- Season 3
- Judges: Jean Marc Lemmery; U Ye Htut Win; Daw Phyu Phyu Tin
- No. of contestants: 20
- Winner: Hsu Mon Hnin
- Runner-up: Myint Thu Htet

Release
- Original network: MRTV-4
- Original release: September 20, 2020 – January 31, 2021

Season chronology
- ← Previous; Season 2 Next → Season 4

The third season of Burmese competitive reality TV cooking show MasterChef Myanmar ran from September 20, 2020, to January 31, 2021, on MRTV-4. Hsu Mon Hnin was the winner of this season. The host of this season was Thazin Nwe Win and the judges were Jean Marc Lemmery, U Ye Htut Win and Daw Phyu Phyu Tin. Henri Delorme was guest judge of this season.

== Top 20 ==
Contestant	Age	Home town	Status
Hsu Mon Hnin	30	Paukkaung	Winner
Myint Thu Htet	23	Yesagyo	Runner-up
Moe Thu	29	Yangon	Eliminated 18th
Ye Lwin Oo	34	Yangon	Eliminated 17th
Nan Htike Oo	30	Meiktila	Eliminated 16th
Min Khant Maw	23	Yangon	Eliminated 15th
Ko Sai	29	Myitkyina	Eliminated 14th
Hein Htet Aung	29	Kalay	Eliminated 13rd
Nine Nine Win	21	Mahlaing	Eliminated 12nd
Than Than Swe	28	Mandalay	Eliminated 11th
Ning Rang Roi San	24	Waingmaw	Eliminated 10th
Sai Aung Kyaw Kyaw	20	Namhkam, Shan State	Eliminated 9th
Myo Myint Oo	22	Myanaung	Eliminated 8th
Ye Pyae Paing	28	Bogale	Eliminated 7th
Lwin Lwin Kyu	40	Pyay	Eliminated 6th
Khin San Tint	48	Kalay	Eliminated 5th
Kyaw Ko Ko Zin	25	Yangon	Eliminated 4th
Hein Min Latt	23	Okpho	Eliminated 3rd
Khaing Zar Chi Than	N/A	N/A	Eliminated 2nd
Nyan Min Phyo	24	Mawlamyine	Eliminated 1st
