= MasterChef Myanmar =

Burmese television program

- Genre: Cooking show
- Presented by: Kaung Htet Zaw; Thazin Nwe Win
- Judges: Michel Louis Meca [1959-2019] Jean Marc Lemmery; U Ye Htut Win (Uncle Sharky); Daw Phyu Phyu Tin; Joseph
- Country of origin: Myanmar
- Original languages: Burmese; English
- No. of seasons: 4

Production
- Running time: 60-90 minutes Every Sundays at 19:00 (MMT)
- Production companies: Forever Group; Endemol Shine Group (2018-2019); Banijay (2020-2023)

Original release
- Network: MRTV-4
- Release: 9 September 2018 – 19 March 2023

Related
- MasterChef

MasterChef Myanmar is a Burmese competitive cooking show. It is based on the British cooking show MasterChef produced by Endemol Shine Group. It is airing on MRTV-4.

== Hosts and judges ==
=== Hosts ===
Key:

Current host
Previous host

Presenter	Season 1	Season 2	Season 3	Season 4
Thazin Nwe Win				
Kaung Htet Zaw				

=== Judging panel ===
Key:

Current judging panel
Previous judge(s)

Judge	Season 1	Season 2	Season 3	Season 4
U Ye Htut Win				
Daw Phyu Phyu Tin				
Joseph				
Jean Marc Lemmery				
Michel Louis Meca				

== Contestants ==
=== Season 1 ===
Top 20

- Tin Tin Oo (Winner)
- Aung Wai Phyo (Runner-up)
- Nilar Aung Win
- Phyo Thurain Oo
- May Phyo Thi
- Khant Zaw Oo
- Aye Aye Thein
- Thiha Min Thway
- Sa Wai Yan Oo
- Htet Myat Oo
- Kyawt Kaythi Aung
- Khin Cho Mar
- Nwet Nwet Win
- Htain Lin Mg
- Zar Zar Aye
- Nang Aye Aye Than
- Win Zaw Lwin
- Phyo Arkar Hein
- Thandar Aye
- Saw Zin Moe

=== Season 2 ===
Top 20

- Arkar (Winner)
- Nay Aung (Runner-up)
- Shoon Shoon Aung
- Naing Zaw
- Naw Lah June Phaw
- Aye Thazin
- May Hnin Phway
- Kaung Kin Htet
- Tharr Htet Shann
- Sushma Arya
- Pyae Pyae
- Phoe Wa Aung
- Htun Kyaw Oo
- Zin Min Min Htet
- Mg Mg Ye Yint
- Kyaw Soe Han
- Gwan Ja La
- Bo Bo Ko
- Seng Jet Aung
- Shio Thaw Zin

=== Season 3 ===
Top 20

- Hsu Mon Hnin (Winner)
- Myint Thu Htet (Runner-up)
- Moe Thu
- Ye Lwin Oo
- Nan Htike Oo
- Min Khant Maw
- Ko Sai
- Hein Htet Aung
- Nine Nine Win
- Than Than Swe
- In Yan Ywal Sant
- Sai Aung Kyaw Kyaw
- Myo Myint Oo
- Ye Pyae Paing
- Lwin Lwin Kyu
- Khin San Tint
- Kyaw Ko Ko Zin
- Hein Min Latt
- Khaing Zar Chi Than
- Nyan Min Phyo

=== Season 4 ===
Top 13

- Hein Htet Aung (Winner)
- Min Khant Maw (Runner-up)
- Nay Aung
- Nan Htike Oo
- Ko Sai
- Kaung Kin Htet
- Aye Thazin
- Htet Myat Oo
- Shoon Shoon Aung
- Lwin Lwin Kyu
- Ning Rang Roi San
- Phoe Wa Aung
- Htain Lin Maung

== Series overview ==
Season	Duration dates	Grand Final	
Season	Duration dates	Winner	Runner-up
1) 2018–19	September 9, 2018 – January 20, 2019	Tin Tin Oo	Aung Wai Phyo
2) 2019	July 14 – November 24, 2019	Arkar	Nay Aung
3) 2020–21	September 20, 2020 – January 31, 2021	Hsu Mon Hnin	Myint Thu Htet
4) 2022–23	November 6, 2022 – March 19, 2023	Hein Htet Aung	Min Khant Maw
