= Dancing with the Stars Myanmar season 1 =

First season of Dancing with the Stars Myanmar

Dancing with the Stars Myanmar
- Season 1
- Celebrity winner: Nant Chit Nadi Zaw
- Professional winner: Tae Min

Release
- Original network: MRTV-4
- Original release: October 27, 2019 – February 3, 2020

Season chronology
- Next → Season 2

The first season of Dancing with the Stars Myanmar was broadcast on MRTV-4 starting on October 27, 2019. Twelve celebrities were paired with twelve professional ballroom dancers. Kaung Htet Zaw and La Wonn Htet were the hosts for this season. The judges were Ian, Jimmy Ko Ko, and Khine Lay.

The season finale aired February 3, 2020, with the winners of the season being singer and actress Nant Chit Nadi Zaw and her dance partner Tae Min.

== Couples ==
The twelve professionals and celebrities that competed were:

Celebrity	Notability (known for)	Professional partner	Voting Number	Status
Myo Ko Ko San	Transgender model	Hi	2	Eliminated 1st
May Kabyar	Actress	Dake Dake	3	Eliminated 2nd
Aung Khant Hmue	Actor	Nay Che	12	Eliminated 3rd
Jean-Marc	Chef	Alfiya	11	Eliminated 4th
Tay Zar Kyaw	Presenter	Eloisa	7	Eliminated 5th
Olivier Cotton	Singer	Yoe Yo	10	Eliminated 6th
Lucas	Actor	Florence	8	Eliminated 7th
Hsu Eaint San	Actress	Lynn Htet	1	Eliminated 8th
Thazin Nwe Win	Presenter, actress	Zek	5	Eliminated 9th
Han Thi	Model, actress	Zuko	4	Third place
Paul Austin	Singer	May Thell	9	Runner-up
Nant Chit Nadi Zaw	Singer, actress	Tae Min	6	Winner
