= Khit Thit Pyo May =

Burmese talk show

- Burmese: ခေတ်သစ်ပျိုမေ
- Genre: Talk show
- Presented by: Thazin Nwe Win; Hsu Mon; Hnin Wutyi Oo; Phyo May San; La Won Htet; Ngu Wah Khaing
- Theme music composer: Kaung Htet Zaw
- Country of origin: Myanmar
- Original language: Burmese

Production
- Running time: 60 minutes

Original release
- Network: MRTV-4
- Release: 2012 – present

Khit Thit Pyo May (Burmese: ခေတ်သစ်ပျိုမေ; lit. 'Girls in New Era') is a popular Burmese live talk show broadcast on MRTV-4. The talk show follows the conversations of beautiful and talented women. The panel covers a wide range of topics but mostly focuses on girls. For instance, the group discusses news and links them to issues that many women find interesting. Experts and celebrities often make guest appearances. The daily TV show is broadcast every morning since 2012.

Khit Thit Pyo May was listed on The Myanmar Times "Top 10 Myanmar TV Shows" in 2019.

== Broadcast schedule ==
- Mondays live show– meeting with the astrologers for ask about business, health, education, love affair and marriage affair. The astrologer answers what people ask about business, health, education, love affair and marriage affair from phone and Facebook page.
- Tuesdays live show– meeting with the doctors for ask about health. The doctor answers what people ask about health from phone and Facebook page.
- Wednesdays live show– meeting with successful men or women for ask life improvement. He or she answers what people ask about life improvement from phone and Facebook page.
- Thursdays live show– meeting for ask women's beauty and physical activities with related persons. He or she answers what people ask about women's beauty and physical activities from phone and Facebook page.
- Fridays live show– meeting with celebrities for ask about art activities. The celebrity answers what people ask about his or her art activities from phone and Facebook page.
- Saturdays live show– meeting with celebrities or famous persons for ask about love affair. The celebrity or famous person answers live what people asking about love affair from phone and Facebook page.
- Sundays recorded show– extra day and not live show, talking with famous persons and other information.
