= The Money Drop Myanmar =

Burmese television program

- Burmese: ငွေတွေဝင်
- Genre: Game show
- Presented by: Kaung Htet Zaw
- Country of origin: Myanmar
- Original language: Burmese

Production
- Production location: Yangon
- Running time: 60 minutes Mondays to Fridays at 18:00 (MMT)

Original release
- Network: Channel 7
- Release: 1 May 2017 – 27 November 2020

Related
- The Million Pound Drop and Million Dollar Money Drop

The Money Drop Myanmar (Burmese: ငွေတွေဝင်) is a Burmese game show which is airing on Channel 7. It is based on original British format, The Million Pound Drop. The show has been airing since 2017.

== Game format ==
This show can be participated with two contestants. Contestants are presented with eight multiple-choice questions. Contestants will get Ks.2,50,00,000/- to compete with as they try to reach the end of the gameshow with all the money.

At the beginning of each round, they will be given two categories to choose one. Each of the first four questions contains four possible answers and the next three have three and the last two. It has different drops and one is the correct answer. Then they asked the question, contestants will choose in a set time (60 seconds) to split all the money.

If the contestants are unsure about this question, they may distribute as much as two or more money as they think is necessary. Contestants will cancel one drop and splits the money on the other drops. Contestants can stop at any time if they are satisfied with their choice.

If the timer is stopped or the time has elapsed, it will open up for incorrect answers. The rest of the money left on the correct answer may go to the next question. This process is repeated until the last question is answered. If the contestants correctly answer the final question, all the remaining money will be owned.
