= Thazin Nwe Win =

Burmese television presenter

- သဇင်နွယ်ဝင်း
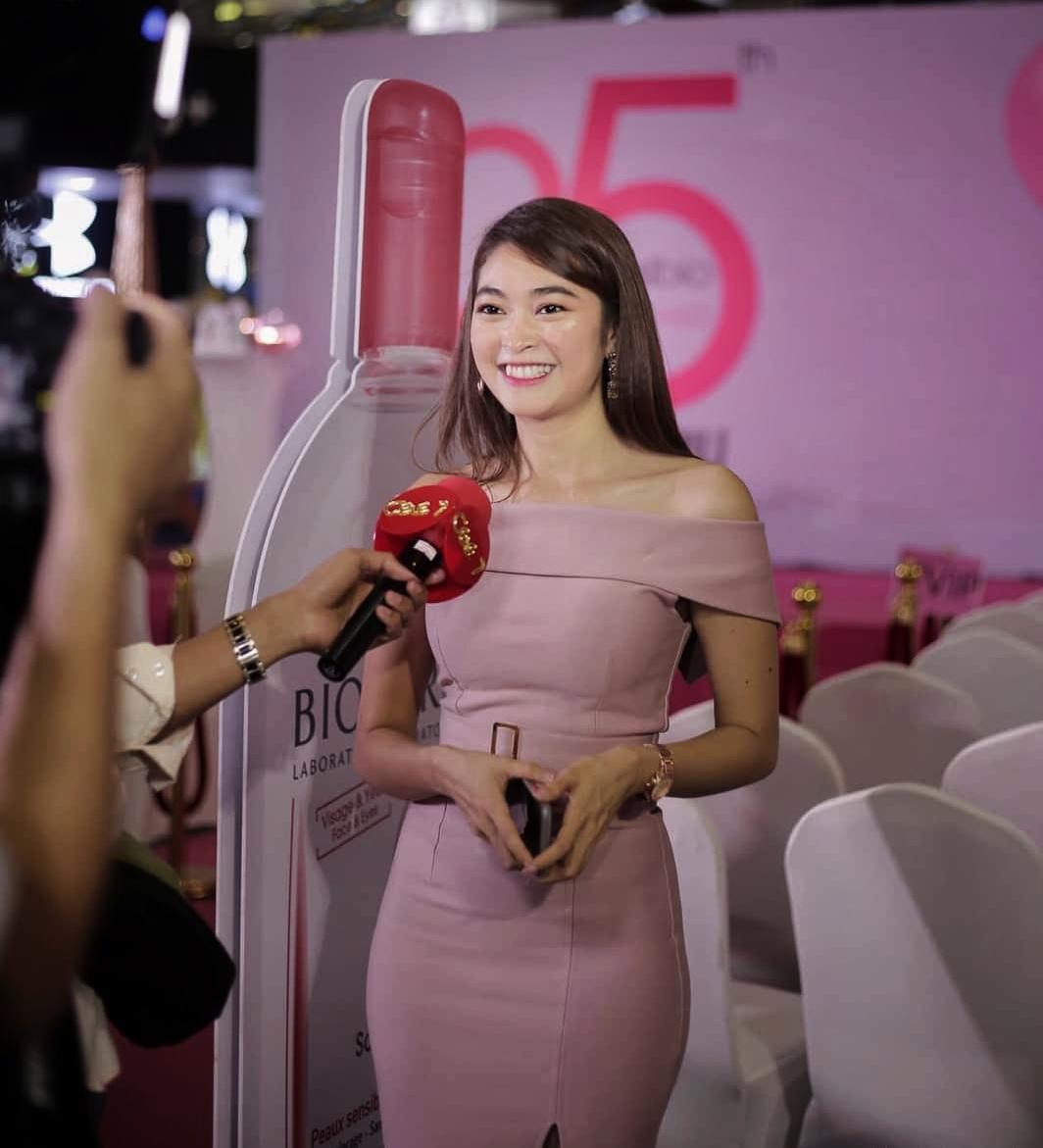
- Thazin Nwe Win in 2019
- Born: Thazin Nwe Win; 15 September 1989 (age 36); Yangon, Myanmar
- Education: Yangon University of Foreign Languages; Dagon University
- Occupations: Television presenter, host, MC, actress
- Years active: 2011–present
- Height: 5 ft 3 in (160 cm)

Thazin Nwe Win (Burmese: သဇင်နွယ်ဝင်း; born 15 September 1989) is a Burmese television presenter, host, MC and actress. She is best known for hosting in notable MRTV-4 TV programs Khit Thit Pyo May and MasterChef Myanmar.

== Early life and education ==
Thazin Nwe Win was born on 15 September 1989 in Yangon, Myanmar. She attended high school at Basic Education High School No. 4 Tamwe. She graduated with a Diploma in English from Yangon University of Foreign Languages and also graduated with a degree B.A (English) from Dagon University in 2009.

== Career ==
In 2011, she was chosen as a TV presenter from among almost 3000 new talents by Forever Group for MRTV-4 and Channel 7. Her first presented the TV program was Gita Lay Nyin. She then presented in MRTV-4's Morning News program. Since 2012, she has been presenting in notable talk show program called Khit Thit Pyo May (Girls in New Era). The program follows the conversations of beautiful and talented women and experts and celebrities often make guest appearances. She has hosted the 2017 Myanmar Academy Awards ceremony, held in 2018.

From 2014 to 2018, she has hosted the Miss World Myanmar for five years. In 2019, she was chosen to host MasterChef Myanmar and participated as a star in the first season of Dancing with the Stars Myanmar. She currently presenting in many MRTV-4 TV programs including Let's Go and Eat, No Challenge No Change, Make Me Beautiful, Forever Group Myanmar Countdown and Channel 7's program The Beauty Studio.

Thanzin Nwe Win also acted in many TV commercials including MPT, Yo Yar Hin Noodle, Happy Coffee, Ready sardine. She worked as a brand ambassador for Yo Yar Hin Noodle from 2017 to 2018. In 2020, she made her acting debut with a main role in the film Escape alongside Min Phone Myat, Tayzar Kyaw, Hmue Thiha Thu and Su Mon, directed by Hein Ko Ko.

In 2025, she was recognized by the Global South World as one of the Top 50 most influential journalists on TikTok in Southeast Asia.

== Political activities ==
Following the 2021 Myanmar coup d'état, Thazin Nwe Win was active in the anti-coup movement both in person at rallies and through social media. Denouncing the military coup, she has taken part in protests since February. She joined the "We Want Justice" three-finger salute movement. The movement was launched on social media, and many celebrities have joined the movement.

On 5 April 2021, warrants for her arrest were issued under section 505 (a) of the penal code by the State Administration Council for speaking out against the military coup. Along with several other celebrities, she was charged with calling for participation in the Civil Disobedience Movement (CDM) and damaging the state's ability to govern, with supporting the Committee Representing Pyidaungsu Hluttaw, and with generally inciting the people to disturb the peace and stability of the nation.

== Filmography ==
=== Film ===
- Escape (လွတ်မြောက်ခြင်း) (2020)

=== Television programs ===
- Khit Thit Pyo May (ခေတ်သစ်ပျိုမေ) (2012–present)
- Miss World Myanmar (2014-2018)
- MasterChef Myanmar (2019–present)
- Dancing with the Stars Myanmar (2019)
- Let's Go and Eat (2019–present)
- No Challenge No Change (2019–present)
- Make Me Beautiful (2019–present)
- Forever Group Myanmar Countdown (2019–present)
- The Beauty Studio (2019–present)

=== Television series ===
- Ma Joe Ko Bal Lo Pyaw Ya Pa (2026)
