= Mandalay FM =

Radio station in Myanmar

Coordinates: 16°48′51.3″N 96°07′59.4″E

- Mandalay; Myanmar
- Broadcast area: Mandalay, Yangon, Taungoo
- Frequency: 87.9 MHz FM

Programming
- Format: News and entertainment

Ownership
- Owner: MCDC and Forever Group
- Sister stations: Teen Radio Pyinsawadi

History
- First air date: 3 April 2008; 17 years ago

Technical information
- Power: 50 kW

Links
- Website: www.mandalayfm.com

Mandalay FM is a radio station that serves the Mandalay metropolitan area (90 miles around Mandalay), broadcasting on the FM band at a frequency of 87.9 MHz and on the Internet. Now the radio station is also serving 30 miles (48 km) around Taungoo and 60 miles (97 km) around Yangon.

Mandalay FM radio will be able to tuned along the Yangon-Mandalay Highway in December. It is operated by the city government, MCDC. Mandalay FM is one of two radio stations available in Mandalay. Mandalay's sole FM station employs a pop culture-oriented format with a focus on Burmese and English pop music, entertainment programs, live celebrity interviews, etc., offering an alternative to the propaganda-laden programming of the state-run Myanmar Radio National Service.

The station is a joint venture between MCDC and Forever Group, one of the country's few multimedia companies with close ties to the country's military government. Starting from 1 August 2024, Mandalay FM and Teen Radio Pyinsawadi merged, which resulted in Teen Radio Pyinsawadi's relay transmitters, which are located in the Ayeyarwady Region and the Rakhine State, starting to simulcast the same programs as Mandalay FM.
