= Dancing with the Stars Myanmar =

Burmese dance competition

- Genre: Reality competition
- Based on: Strictly Come Dancing
- Presented by: Kaung Htet Zaw; La Wonn Htet
- Judges: Ian; Jimmy Ko Ko; Khine Le Ye Kyaw (Khine Lay)
- Country of origin: Myanmar
- No. of seasons: 1

Production
- Running time: 60–90 minutes Every Sunday at 21:00 (MMT)

Original release
- Release: October 27, 2019 – present

Related
- Dancing with the Stars

Dancing with the Stars Myanmar is a Burmese dance competition television series that premiered on October 27, 2019, on MRTV-4. It was based on the format of the British TV series Strictly Come Dancing and is part of the Dancing with the Stars franchise. The show is hosted by Kaung Htet Zaw, alongside La Wonn Htet.

The format of the show consists of a competing celebrity paired with a professional dancer. Each couple performs predetermined dances and competes against the others for judges' points and audience votes. The couple receiving the lowest combined total of judges' points and audience votes is eliminated each week until only the champion dance pair remains.

== Cast ==
=== Presenters ===
Key:

Current presenter
Previous presenter

Presenter	Season 1
Kaung Htet Zaw	
La Wonn Htet	

=== Judging panel ===
Key:

Current judging panel
Previous judge(s)

Judge	Season 1
Ian	
Jimmy Ko Ko	
Khine Lay	

== Contestants ==
=== Season 1 ===
- Myo Ko Ko San (with her professional partner Hi)
- May Kabyar (with her professional partner Dake Dake)
- Aung Khant Hmue (with his professional partner Nay Che)
- Jean-Marc (with his professional partner Alfiya)
- Tay Zar Kyaw (with his professional partner Eloisa)
- Olivier Cottone (with his professional partner Yoe Yo)
- Lucas (with his professional partner Florence)
- Hsu Eaint San (with her professional partner Lynn Htet)
- Thazin Nwe Win (with her professional partner Zek)
- Han Thi (with her professional partner Zuko)
- Paul Austin (with his professional partner May Thell)
- Nant Chit Nadi Zaw (with her professional partner Tae Min)

== Series overview ==
Season	No. of stars	No. of weeks	Duration dates	Celebrity honor places		
Season	No. of stars	No. of weeks	Duration dates	Winner	Second place	Third place
1) 2019–20	12	TBA	October 27, 2019 – February 3, 2020	Nant Chit Nadi Zaw & Tae Min	Paul Austin & May Thell	Han Thi & Zuko
