= Wyne Lay =

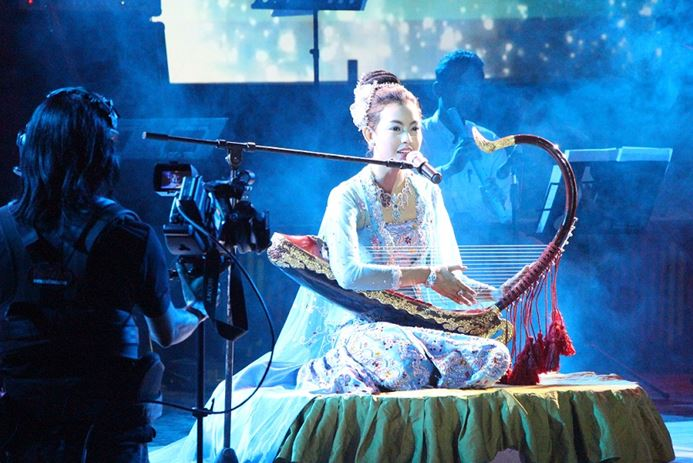
- Wyne Lay singing with a saung (Myanmar harp)
- Born: Wint Yee Shunn; August 3, 1994 (age 32); Yangon, Myanmar
- Education: Yangon University of Foreign Languages
- Occupations: Singer; Songwriter; Pianist; Model
- Height: 5 ft 7 in (1.70 m)
- Musical career
- Instruments: Vocals; Piano; Guitar; Saung
- Years active: 2012–present
- Website: Facebook page

Wyne Lay (Burmese: ဝိုင်းလေး; born Wint Yee Shunn on 3 August 1994) is a Burmese singer, songwriter, pianist, model and beauty pageant title holder. She was crowned the Miss Myanmar World 2014 and represented Myanmar at Miss World 2014. Wyne has achieved fame and success as a model and singer.

== Early life and education ==
Wyne Lay was born on 3 August 1994 at No.2 Military Hospital, Dagon Township, Yangon, Myanmar to parents Moe Kyaw and Nu Nu. She is youngest daughter of three siblings, having two older sisters.

Wyne's family moved to Sittwe, Rakhine State, in 1999, and she attended primary school at Basic Education Middle School (BEMS) in Meiktila. She studied fifth grade at Basic Education Middle School No. 1, and enrolled in high school at Basic Education High School No. 2 Bahan. She enrolled at Yangon University of Foreign Languages, majoring in French. She successfully finished her degree BA (French) in 2013.

== Pageantry ==
=== Miss Myanmar World 2014 ===
She competed in Miss Myanmar World 2014 which was held on 27 September 2014 in Yangon. She became the winner of Miss World Myanmar 2014 after the competition. Wyne is the first Miss World Myanmar, after Myanmar revitalized its participation in the pageant. She was make judge in the Top 20 finalist of Miss World Myanmar 2017 pageant.

=== Miss World 2014 ===
She represented Myanmar at the Miss World 2014 pageant, one of the largest beauty pageants in the world, to be held in December 2014 at ExCeL London in London, but was unplaced.

== Career ==
Wyne began studying piano at age 8. She joined the Myanmar Traditional Arts Competition and won her first gold medal for piano skills in 2004. She won two silver medals in 2005 and 2006, and gold in 2007. Pianists Thet Oo, Tin Win Hlaing, Ngway Soe, Myo Naing and Tun Tun were her teachers. She received voice training from songwriter Naung Naung (SF) and Ko Pi (Triangle Band).

Wyne was first runner up for French Songs Competition at French Embassy Myanmar in 2011. Her breakthrough performance was in the fourth season of Eain Met Sone Yar (Where dreams meet), in which she was second runner up. Wyne writes songs and plays the saung (Myanmar harp).

In 2013, Myanmar hosted the 27th South East Asia Games. She took part in the recording for this event. She participated in six group albums from 2013 to 2014 and promoted a music video karaoke album, "Legend of Nightingale", in 2013 with two other singers. She starred in her own music videos.

Her first solo album "Selfie" was released in 2015. The music video was released on 15 May 2016. Afterward she joined in some group albums and continued modeling. Her second album "Wyne" was released on 17 February 2018 which turned out to be a success creating him a place to stand in Myanmar music industry. In 2019, Wyne had contributed in one of the popular hit songs as Korean Version called 기다림보다(Gidalimboda).

Wyne had performed her first solo concert "The Inspiration" as her remarkable milestone on 12 February 2020 at Time City outdoor area in Yangon.

== Awards and achievements ==
- "Wyne" second solo DVD album released in 2020 Feb 12 ranked top 6 best seller in music stores(2020)
- Winner of Miss Myanmar World 2014
- Selfie music album ranked top 5/6 in FM (Shwe FM & City FM); No. 9 best seller in music stores (2015)
- Eain Mat Sone Yar, season 4, second runner up (2012)
- National Finale Contest, by Institut Francais Birmanie first runner up (2011)
- Myanmar Traditional Piano Contest, 1 gold medal (2007), 2 silver medals (2006, 2006)

== Discography ==
=== Singles ===
2014
Hoping (Myaw Lint Yin)Feat. Tmix

2015
SMILE (Pyone Par)

2016
Lar Lay Lar Hey(Thingyan Song) 2017
Miss me as a duty(Tar Win aya)
Better Breakup(Lan KwalTar Kg mel) Feat.Moe Htet

2018
Will be Fine(A Sin Pyay twar mhar par)
Trauma Rain(Dan Yar Moe)Feat. Yzet

2019
Sorry Not Sorry(Feat. Moe Htet)
Freedom(Loot Lat yay)
She and I (Thu Nal Ngar)

2020
Love Letter(Chit Tha Won Hlwar)
Broken(KWAL)

=== Solo albums ===
- Selfie <Download Here> (2015)
- Wyneaudio CD <Download here> (2017)
- "Wyne" DVD (2020)

=== Group albums ===
- Legend of Nightingale (တေးသီငှက်တို့ဒဏ္ဍာရီ) (2013)

=== Original Sound Track OST ===
2017
Time Circle(A chaine sat wine) Composed by Myint Moe Aung
Turning Point of The Clouds DRAMA (Sone_See_Chin_Moe_Tain_Myar)
Happy in my daydreams(Sate ku lay nal pyor mel) Composed by Wyne Lay

2020
Turning Point of The Clouds DRAMA (Sone See chin moe tain myar)
