= MasterChef Myanmar season 2 =

Second season of MasterChef Myanmar

MasterChef Myanmar
- Season 2
- Judges: Jean Marc Lemmery; U Ye Htut Win; Daw Phyu Phyu Tin
- No. of contestants: 20
- Winner: Arkar
- Runner-up: Nay Aung

Release
- Original network: MRTV-4
- Original release: July 14 – November 24, 2019

Season chronology
- ← Previous; Season 1 Next → Season 3

The second season of Burmese competitive reality TV cooking show MasterChef Myanmar ran from July 14, 2019, to November 24, 2019, on MRTV-4. Arkar was the winner of this season. The host of this season was Thazin Nwe Win and the judges were Jean Marc Lemmery, U Ye Htut Win and Daw Phyu Phyu Tin.

== Top 20 ==
Contestant	Age	Home town	Status
Arkar	24	Yangon	Winner
Nay Aung	27	Shwebo	Runner-up
Shoon Shoon Aung	25	Yangon	Eliminated 18th
Naing Zaw	32	Nay Pyi Taw	Eliminated 17th
Naw Lah June Phaw	29	Hpa-an	Eliminated 16th
Aye Thazin	48	Yangon	Eliminated 15th
May Hnin Phway	36	Yangon	Eliminated 14th
Kaung Kin Htet	24	Yangon	Eliminated 13th
Thar Htet Shan	19	Yangon	Eliminated 12th
Sushma Arya	33	India	Eliminated 11th
Pyayt Pyayt	30	Yangon	Eliminated 10th
Phoe Wa Aung	20	Yangon	Eliminated 9th
Tun Kyaw Oo	19	Yangon	Eliminated 8th
Zin Min Min Htet	36	Yangon	Eliminated 7th
Maung Maung Ye Yint	28	Yangon	Eliminated 6th
Kyaw Soe Han	22	Yangon	Eliminated 5th
Gwan Jar La	34	Yangon	Eliminated 4th
Bo Bo Ko	32	Yangon	Eliminated 3rd
Seng Jet Aung	25	Yangon	Eliminated 2nd
Shio Thaw Kaung	20	Yangon	Eliminated 1st
