= Steve Harvey =

American comedian and television host (born 1957)

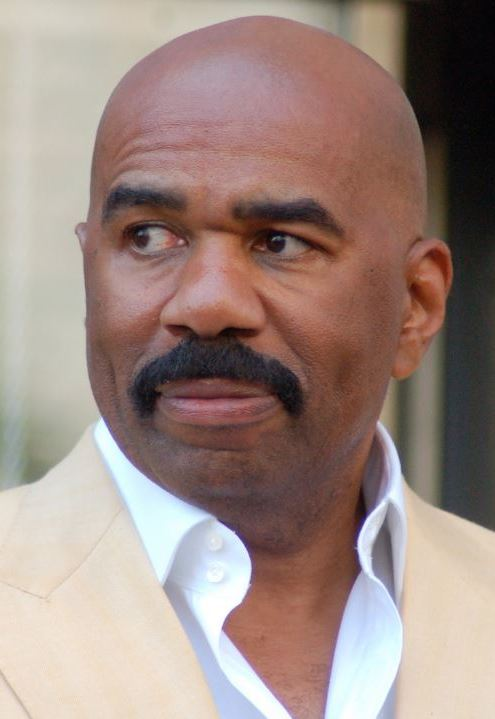
- Harvey in 2013
- Born: Broderick Stephen Harvey; January 17, 1957 (age 69); Welch, West Virginia, U.S.
- Education: Kent State University; West Virginia University
- Occupations: Comedian; television host; actor; writer; producer
- Years active: 1985–present
- Spouses: Marcia Harvey (m. 1981; div. 1994); Mary Shackelford (m. 1996; div. 2005); Marjorie Bridges (m. 2007)
- Children: 7, including Lori Harvey (Note: Lori Harvey is Marjorie's daughter whom Steve adopted after marriage.)
- Website: steveharvey.com

Broderick Stephen Harvey (born January 17, 1957) is an American comedian, radio and television host, actor, writer, and producer. He hosts The Steve Harvey Morning Show, Family Feud, Celebrity Family Feud, Family Feud Africa, and the arbitration-based court comedy Judge Steve Harvey, and formerly hosted the Miss Universe competition. His accomplishments include seven Daytime Emmy Awards, two Marconi Awards, and fourteen NAACP Image Awards.

Harvey began his career as a stand-up comedian in the early 1980s, and later hosted Showtime at the Apollo and starred in the television sitcom The Steve Harvey Show on The WB. In 2000, he was featured in The Original Kings of Comedy after starring in the Kings of Comedy Tour. His last standup show was in 2012. Harvey is also the host of both Family Feud and Celebrity Family Feud, holding this role since 2010. He also hosted Little Big Shots, Little Big Shots Forever Young, and Steve Harvey's Funderdome.

As an author, Harvey has written four books, including his 2009 bestseller Act Like a Lady, Think Like a Man. In 2017, he founded Steve Harvey Global, an entertainment company that houses his production company East 112 and various other ventures. Harvey launched an African version of Family Feud and also invested in the HDNet takeover along with Anthem Sports and Entertainment. He and his wife, Marjorie, are the founders of The Steve and Marjorie Harvey Foundation, a nonprofit organization focused on youth education.

== Early life ==
Broderick Stephen Harvey was born on January 17, 1957, in Welch, West Virginia, the son of Jesse Harvey, a coal miner, and Eloise Vera. He is the youngest of five children. His first name is Broderick, named after actor Broderick Crawford of the TV series Highway Patrol. Harvey had a severe stutter as a child, but eventually overcame it. When he was in the sixth grade, Harvey wrote that he wanted to be on TV when he grew up, after his teacher asked the class to record their personal dreams. Harvey's teacher told his father that Harvey was being a "smart aleck". However, his father believed in him — and after Harvey achieved his dream, he sent his teacher a TV every year for Christmas for the rest of her life. Harvey and his family moved to Cleveland, Ohio, living on East 112th Street, which was renamed Steve Harvey Way in 2015. Harvey graduated from Glenville High School in 1974.

Shortly after high school, Harvey attended Kent State University, where he was a member of Omega Psi Phi fraternity, but never graduated from college. He readily admits to "flunking out" of Kent State after two years as an advertising major in the 1970s. While Harvey has talked about overcoming his early life and educational obstacles, Harvey later conceded, "It really threw my life into a downward spiral, and I regret not getting that degree."

== Career ==
=== Early career and comedy ===
Harvey has been a boxer, an autoworker, an insurance salesman, a carpet cleaner, and a mailman. He first performed stand-up comedy on October 8, 1985, at the Hilarities Comedy Club in Cleveland, Ohio. In the late 1980s, Harvey was homeless for three years. He slept in his car when not performing shows that provided a hotel, and showered at gas stations and swimming pools. Rich and Becky Liss helped Harvey during this time with a contract for carpet cleaning and credit at a travel agency.

=== 1990–2009: Move to television and film ===
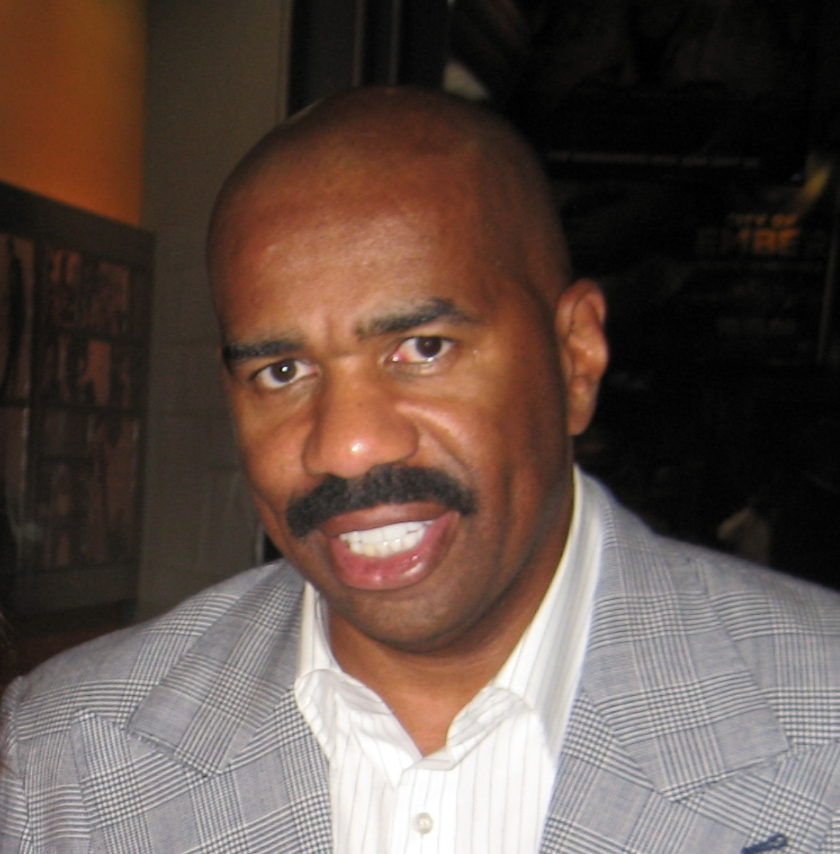
Harvey in September 2008

Harvey was a finalist in the Second Annual Johnnie Walker National Comedy Search performing on April 16, 1990, eventually leading to a long stint as host of It's Showtime at the Apollo, succeeding Mark Curry in that role. Harvey's success as a stand-up comedian led to a starring role on the short-lived ABC series Me and the Boys in 1994. He would later star on The WB network show The Steve Harvey Show, which ran from 1996 to 2002. While popular, the show never achieved critical acclaim outside of the African-American community.

In 1997, Harvey continued his work in stand-up comedy, performing on the Kings of Comedy tour along with Cedric the Entertainer, D.L. Hughley, and Bernie Mac. The tour became the highest grossing comedy tour in history, grossing $18 million its first year and $19 million its second. The comedy act would later be put together into a film by Spike Lee called The Original Kings of Comedy. That title was also used as the name of Harvey's comedy and variety television show (later renamed Steve Harvey's Big Time Challenge), which aired on The WB network from 2003 until 2005.

Harvey is the host of The Steve Harvey Morning Show, a weekday morning radio program he has hosted since 2000. It was originally syndicated through Radio One, Inc. from September 2000 to May 2005. As of 2019, the show is syndicated throughout the United States.

Harvey appeared in the 2003 movie The Fighting Temptations alongside Cuba Gooding Jr. and Beyoncé Knowles. The same year, he played the role of Clarence Johnson in the film Love Don't Cost a Thing. In 2004, Harvey had roles in the films Johnson Family Vacation and You Got Served; in 2005, he co-starred in the movie Racing Stripes as the voice of Buzz.

In 2006, Harvey released the stand-up special Steve Harvey: Don't Trip... He Ain't Through with Me Yet directed by Leslie Small. The special was filmed at MegaFest with Harvey not using profanity during the show. He hosted the Disney Dreamers Academy, a teen-focused personal and professional enrichment event that took place January 17–20, 2008, at the Walt Disney World Resort in Lake Buena Vista, Florida.

Harvey released the book Act Like a Lady, Think Like a Man in 2009. The book is about how men think about women and relationships. Based on the book, the 2012 film Think Like a Man is an ensemble romantic comedy depicting characters taking advice on dating from the book. The hardcover version spent 64 weeks on The New York Times best-seller list, 23 of those weeks at No. 1.

=== 2010–2016: Family Feud and other ventures ===
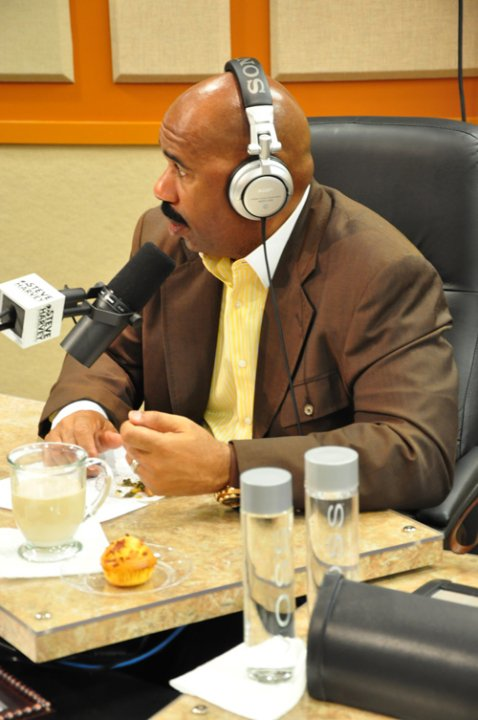
Harvey hosting his syndicated radio show in April 2010

Harvey started hosting Family Feud in September 2010. The show has seen improved ratings under him, and Harvey holds the longest tenure of any Family Feud host. He also hosts Celebrity Family Feud, where celebrities compete for a chance to donate up to $25,000 to their favorite charity. The show airs during the summer on ABC.

In August 2011, on his radio show, Harvey called Cornel West and Tavis Smiley "Uncle Toms" because of their criticism of President Barack Obama. Harvey later apologized for using the phrase but maintained his criticism of West and Smiley.

On August 2, 2012, Harvey performed his final stand-up act at the MGM Grand in Las Vegas, ending a 27-year career as a stand-up comedian. The two-hour performance was broadcast live on pay-per-view.

"The road to this final show has been an amazing journey, doing stand-up for the past 27 years, and I can't thank fans enough after reflecting on all those years on stage."

— Harvey on his stand-up comedy career

The same year, Harvey debuted a self-titled syndicated talk show produced by Endemol and distributed by NBCUniversal Television Distribution at the NBC Tower in Chicago.

In 2013, Harvey became the first double host nominated for a Daytime Emmy Award, receiving nominations for both Outstanding Talk Show Host and Outstanding Game Show Host. He was also honored with a star on the Hollywood Walk of Fame. The following year, Harvey launched a new dating website called Delightful. It is a joint venture with IAC with Harvey supplying articles and videos for the site.

In December 2015, Harvey hosted the Miss Universe 2015 pageant in Las Vegas. Upon announcing the final results, he mistakenly named the first runner-up, Miss Colombia (Ariadna Gutiérrez) as the winner, as Harvey apparently mistook the envelope as the name of the final runner-up for that of the winner. A few minutes after she was crowned, Harvey announced that he had read the results incorrectly and that Miss Philippines (Pia Wurtzbach) was the new Miss Universe. Harvey apologized to Wurtzbach outside the venue and later tweeted an apology to both contestants. He also hosted the Miss Universe 2016 pageant in the Philippines on January 30, 2017, telling the Miss Universe Organization that he wanted to personally apologize to the Filipinos for the incident that occurred during the last Miss Universe pageant he hosted. Harvey returned as host for the Miss Universe 2017 pageant in Las Vegas on November 26, 2017, the Miss Universe 2018 pageant in Thailand on December 17, 2018, the Miss Universe 2019 pageant in Atlanta, Georgia on December 8, 2019, and the Miss Universe 2021 pageant in Israel on December 13, 2021. During the 2019 pageant, he correctly announced Miss Philippines (Gazini Ganados) as the winner of the National Costume contest but Miss Malaysia (Shweta Sekhon) mistakenly thought she won.

In January 2016, Harvey gave a motivational speech to audience members after the taping of an episode of Family Feud. The theme of the speech was for people to embrace the skills they were born with. He references embracing the gifts with jumping from a cliff and relying on the parachute (those gifts) to help you. The speech was the motivation for the book Jump: Take the Leap of Faith to Achieve Your Life of Abundance, published by Harvey in 2016.

In October 2016, it was announced that Harvey would host two revival specials of Showtime at the Apollo for Fox. The following month, the Steve Harvey talk show was cancelled, and it was announced that Harvey had reached a deal with IMG to produce a new syndicated talk show in Los Angeles with NBCUniversal. The new series, Steve, premiered in September 2017, and was described as having more of a celebrity- and comedy-oriented format with a larger amount of creative control held by Harvey, as opposed to the previous program's larger focus on human interest subjects. To facilitate the new series, production of Harvey's radio show and Family Feud were relocated to L.A.

Harvey is the co-creator of Little Big Shots, a series launched in 2016; executive producers are Harvey and Ellen DeGeneres. The series features children demonstrating talents and engaging in conversation with Harvey. He hosted the show until 2019.

In 2016, during a commencement ceremony at Alabama State University, President Dr. Gwendolyn Boyd awarded Harvey an honorary doctorate.

=== 2017–present: Steve Harvey Global ===
Harvey united all of his businesses under Steve Harvey Global (SHG) in 2017. Brands under SHG include East One Twelve, Harvey's in-house production company that is used to develop digital content, films, and television. The company also owns the rights for international versions of Family Feud, of which an African version of the show was announced to begin in 2020. He also launched the Sand and Soul Festival in 2017. The event has been held yearly and features live music, comedy, and a question and answers session with Harvey and his wife Marjorie. He also launched Harvey Events, a special events company led by his daughter Morgan Hawthorne and son-in-law Kareem Hawthorne. It has produced events such as the FroRibbean Fest in Atlanta in 2018.

In 2017, Harvey began hosting a New Year's Eve special from Times Square for Fox (which, like his talk show, would be produced in partnership with IMG). Two days before the broadcast, Harvey was ordained in the state of New York so he could officiate an on-air wedding between Keven Undergaro and Maria Menounos during the special. The special was Fox's most-watched New Year's Eve broadcast to date.

In January 2017, Harvey made jokes on Steve Harvey about Asian men, ridiculing the idea that any white or black woman would want to date one. He said: "Excuse me, do you like Asian men? No, thank you." Harvey went on to add, "I don't even like Chinese food." The remarks brought criticism from Asian Americans, including New York politicians and Fresh Off the Boat author Eddie Huang. Huang called Harvey "hypocritical" for speaking about issues facing the black community while denigrating Asians. Harvey apologized on his talk show and Twitter, saying: "I offer my humblest apology for offending anyone, particularly those in the Asian community … It was not my intention, and the humor was not meant with any malice or disrespect whatsoever." However, he also earlier said, "I ain't been laughing that much over the past few days. They're kinda beating me up on the internet right now for no reason. But, you know, that's life, ain't it?"

In response to a caller from Flint, Michigan, who insulted the Cleveland Cavaliers after their loss to the Golden State Warriors in the 2017 NBA Finals, Harvey, a Cavaliers fan, told the caller to "go have yourself a nice glass of brown water!" in reference to the city's water crisis. The joke was criticized by, among others, Amariyanna Copeny and Flint Mayor Karen Weaver, who demanded a public apology. Harvey responded by saying, "The caller and I were talking trash about our teams and cities. Simply trash talking about sports. I made a joke directed at him, as he is from Flint, a city for which I have great affection and respect. So much so that I devoted a full hour on my daytime talk show to raising awareness for the Flint water crisis … The caller laughed, as my joke was taken in the context it was offered."

At the end of 2018, it was announced that Harvey would host the eighth annual NFL Honors. He said that he had wanted to host it for a while, going as far as to say in his opening monologue: "What took y'all so long to ask me to host the show?" Harvey returned to host the ninth annual show the following season.

In 2019, Harvey announced the launch of a learning hub called Vault. He also invested in the takeover of HDNet along with Anthem Sports & Entertainment.

In January 2022, Harvey began hosting the arbitration-based court comedy Judge Steve Harvey on ABC.

On International Day of Happiness 2022, Harvey, on behalf of the United States and the Vatican pavilions, held a talk in Dubai during Expo 2020 to discuss the relations between happiness and religion.

In March 2024, it was announced that Harvey would join Merit Street Media, an upcoming multi-platform media outlet owned and created by his longtime friend Phil McGraw, the former host of Dr. Phil.

== Philanthropy ==
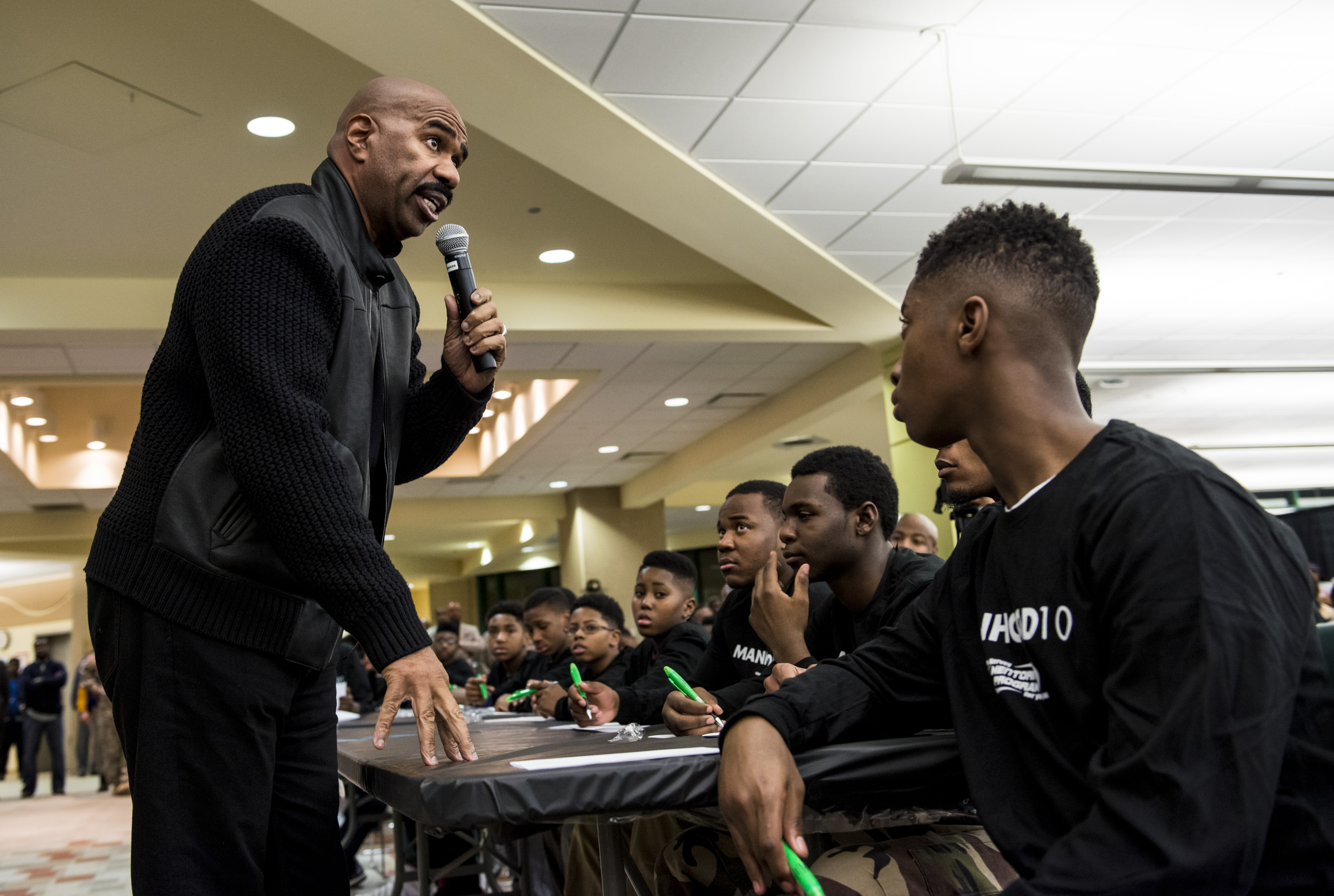
Harvey talking to a group of Chicago youths during the Steve Harvey Mentoring Weekend in 2015

Harvey is the founder of the Steve & Marjorie Harvey Foundation, a philanthropic organization that provides youth outreach services. It hosts a yearly camp for fatherless children and also partnered with Kent State University to provide scholarships to the school. Harvey is also a partner with Walt Disney World Resort and Essence for the Disney Dreamers Academy, a yearly workshop at Walt Disney World for 100 students.

During the 2022 Halloween Thriller Night hosted by the Heal Los Angeles Foundation, Harvey and Chris Tucker received the inaugural "Man in The Mirror" Award, given to influential individuals who use their platforms for good. Harvey accepted the award presented by Prince Jackson, son of Michael Jackson.

== Personal life ==
Harvey has been married three times and has seven children (four biological children and three stepchildren). From his first marriage to Marcia Harvey, Harvey has two daughters (twins Brandi and Karli) and a son (Broderick Stephen Jr.). From his second marriage to Mary Shackelford, Harvey has a son named Wynton. The couple divorced in November 2005. In 2011, Judge Robert Dry, based in the 199th District Court in Collin County, Texas, expressed concern about Mary Harvey spreading false information about the divorce, with the judge suggesting that she had not been left materially destitute.

In June 2007, Harvey married Marjorie Bridges, who he says is responsible for making him a better man and changing his life. Marjorie is a mother to three children (Morgan, Jason, and Lori), all of whom Steve adopted. They have five grandchildren: three through Jason's marriage to his wife Amanda, one through Morgan's marriage to her husband Kareem, and one through Karli's marriage to her husband Ben. Through 2017, Harvey and his family divided their time between Atlanta, where his radio show was broadcast and Family Feud was recorded, and Chicago, where he hosted his talk show for NBCUniversal from the company's Chicago studios, although he would host his radio show there as well. In 2018, Harvey moved his talk show, radio show, and Family Feud to Los Angeles. Family Feud was moved back to Atlanta in August 2020.

In January 2017, Harvey was met with criticism from both within and outside of the black community for his decision to meet with then-President-elect Donald Trump. He defended his decision, citing that it would help spark positive changes.

Harvey follows a vegan diet for health reasons and has presented the rationale for his diet on his TV talk show.

=== Religious views ===
Harvey is a Christian and has attributed his success to his faith in God. Harvey is an advocate for religious harmony, expressing reverence especially to Islam, and the belief that "to get to heaven, there's gotta be more than one route."

Harvey has received sharp criticism for expressing critical, intolerant views about atheists and agnostics, including during a May 30, 2009 book interview he gave on Larry King Live, which was guest-hosted by Joy Behar. During that interview, expressing disdain for the concept of secular morality, he asserted that women should not date atheists who, he claimed, have no "moral barometer." He opined that atheists are "idiot[s]" that he does not enjoy interacting with, and stated that his usual response to discussions with atheists is to walk away.

== Written works ==
- 2009, Act Like a Lady, Think Like a Man
- 2010, Straight Talk, No Chaser
- 2014, Act Like a Success
- 2016, Jump, Take the Leap of Faith to Achieve Your Life of Abundance

== Filmography ==
=== Television ===
Year	Title	Role	Notes
1993–2000, 2016–2018	Showtime at the Apollo	Himself/host	
1994–1995	Me and the Boys	Steve Tower	19 episodes
1996–2002	The Steve Harvey Show	Steve Hightower	122 episodes; also producer
2001	The Proud Family	The Credit Card (voice)	Episode: "Don't Leave Home Without It"
2002, 2003	Essence Awards	Himself/host	
2002	My Wife and Kids	Steve	Episode: "Jay the Artist"
2003	The Parkers	Mr. Barnes	Episode: "The Hold Up"
2003–2005	Steve Harvey's Big Time Challenge	Himself/host	Also executive producer
2004, 2005	BET Comedy Awards	Himself/host	
2010	Who Wants to Be a Millionaire	Himself/Guest host	5 episodes
2010–present	Family Feud	Himself/host	
2012	Praise the Lord	Himself/Guest host	November 30
2012–2017	Steve Harvey	Himself/host	Also executive producer
2013	NAACP Image Awards	Himself/host	February 1
2015	Comedians in Cars Getting Coffee	Himself	Season 6 Episode 2
2015–present	Celebrity Family Feud	Himself/host	Also executive producer
2015, 2017–2019, 2021	Miss Universe	Himself/host	
2016–2018	Little Big Shots	Himself/host	Also creator/executive producer
2017	Steve Harvey's Funderdome	Himself/host	
2017	Little Big Shots: Forever Young	Himself/host	Also executive producer
2017–2019	Steve	Himself/host	Also executive producer
2019–2021	NFL Honors	Himself/host	Host of the 8th, 9th, and 10th honors.
2019–2020	WWE Network Special	Himself/host	Special Guest
2020–present	Family Feud Africa	Himself/host	
2020–present	Steve on Watch	Himself/host	Also executive producer
2022–2024	Judge Steve Harvey	Himself/host	Also executive producer
2026	Family Feud Philippines	Himself/guest	April 24

=== Film ===
Year	Title	Role	Note
2000	The Original Kings of Comedy	Himself	Standup special
2003	The Fighting Temptations	Miles Smoke	
2003	Love Don't Cost a Thing	Clarence Johnson	
2004	Johnson Family Vacation	Mack Johnson	
2004	You Got Served	Mr. Rad	
2005	Racing Stripes	Buzz the Fly	Voice only
2006	Steve Harvey: Don't Trip... He Ain't Through with Me Yet	Himself	Standup special
2008	Still Singing	Himself	Standup special
2009	Madea Goes to Jail	Himself	Cameo appearance
2012	Think Like a Man	Himself	Cameo appearance; also executive producer

=== Internet streaming ===
Year	Title	Role	Note
2021	Verzuz	Himself/host	"The Isley Brothers vs Earth Wind & Fire" Episode

== Awards and honors ==
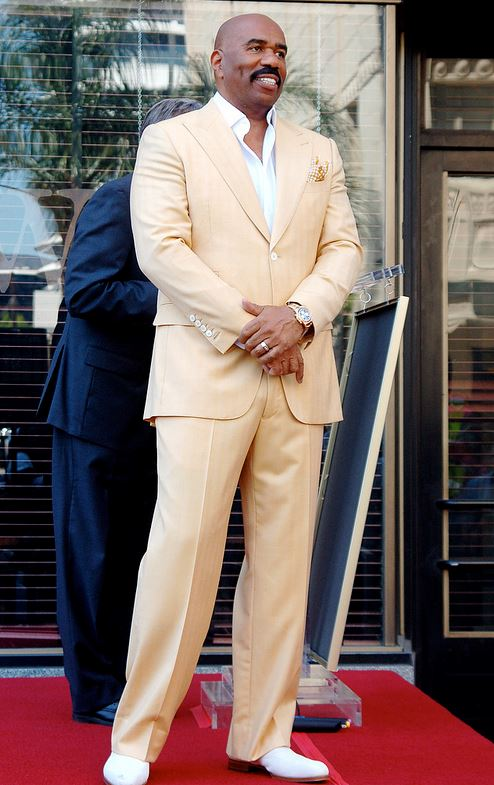
Harvey receiving his star on the Hollywood Walk of Fame in 2013

Emmy Awards

- 2014: Daytime Emmy Award for Outstanding Game Show Host – Family Feud
- 2014: Daytime Emmy Award for Daytime Emmy Award for Outstanding Talk Show Informative (as host/executive producer of Steve Harvey)
- 2015: Daytime Emmy Award for Outstanding Talk Show Informative (as host/executive producer of Steve Harvey)
- 2017: Daytime Emmy Award for Outstanding Informative Talk Show Host – Steve Harvey
- 2017: Daytime Emmy Award for Outstanding Game Show Host – Family Feud
- 2018: Daytime Emmy Award for Outstanding Informative Talk Show Host – Steve
- 2022: Daytime Emmy Award for Outstanding Game Show Host – Family Feud

NAACP Image Awards

- Four-time winner: Outstanding Actor in a Comedy Series (1999, 2000, 2001, 2002)
- Three-time winner: Outstanding Comedy Series (as executive producer/star of The Steve Harvey Show – 2000, 2001, 2002)
- 2001: Entertainer of the Year
- Three-time winner: Outstanding News/Talk/Info Series (as executive producer/host of Steve Harvey – 2014, 2015, 2017)
- 2015: Outstanding Host – Talk/Reality/Variety/News/Information
- 2016: Outstanding Host – Talk/Reality/Variety/News/Information
- 2016: Outstanding Variety Series/Special (as host of Family Feud)

Radio

- 2007: Syndicated Personality/Show of the Year – Radio & Records magazine
- 2013: Marconi Award winner – Network/Syndicated Personality of the Year
- 2015: Marconi Award winner – Network/Syndicated Personality of the Year

Television

- 2013: Favorite New Talk Show Host – 39th People's Choice Awards

Organizational

- 2011: BET Humanitarian Award – 2011 BET Awards

Halls of Fame

- 2013: Star on the Hollywood Walk of Fame
- 2014: NAB Broadcasting Hall of Fame inductee (Radio)

State/local

- 2015: East 112th Street in Cleveland renamed Steve Harvey Way

Honorary degrees

- 2016: Honorary Doctorate Degree Received at Alabama State University in Montgomery, Alabama

== Notes ==
Media offices
Preceded by John O'Hurley	Host of Family Feud; 2010–present	Incumbent
Preceded by Thomas Roberts and Natalie Morales	Hosts of Miss Universe; 2015–2019	Succeeded by Mario Lopez and Olivia Culpo
Preceded by Mario Lopez and Olivia Culpo	Hosts of Miss Universe; 2021	Succeeded by Jeannie Mai and Olivia Culpo
