= Family Feud Africa =

Television show

- Genre: Game show
- Based on: Family Feud by Mark Goodson
- Presented by: Steve Harvey
- Theme music composer: Walt Levinsky; Edd Kalehoff
- Country of origin: South Africa
- Original language: English
- No. of seasons: 2
- No. of episodes: 52

Production
- Executive producer: Steve Harvey
- Production locations: Randburg, South Africa
- Production companies: Steve Harvey Global; Rapid Blue

Original release
- Network: e.tv
- Release: April 5, 2020 – present

Related
- Family Feud (American version)

Family Feud Africa is a South African game show produced by Rapid Blue and Steve Harvey Global for Fremantle, and broadcast on e.tv, starting from April 5, 2020. It is the South African version of the American show of the same name, and was filmed after Season 21 of the current American version (which started in 1999) was completed, in December 2019. Fremantle offered selected production staffers and host Steve Harvey for the production. Tapings occurred at Urban Brew Studios in Randburg.

The show's logo is based on the logo from the first seven seasons (1999–2006) of the current American version, with the set based on the 2010 version. The show uses music cues from the 1976 and 1988 Walt Levinsky and 1994 Edd Kalehoff composed versions of "The Feud". The Kalehoff version is used in round or Fast Money winning situations. The graphics come from the 2014 Australian version.

For Season 2 (2021), the podiums were changed to reflect the changes to the set in August 2020.

== Gameplay ==
Similar to the pre-1992 United States rules, families win money based on their main game score. The first and second rounds are single, the third and fourth are double, and the fifth round is for triple money. Both families earn R50 per point, with the higher scoring family playing Fast Money for R75,000, with a loss earning the family R150 per point.

== Other versions ==
A Ghanaian version is also produced in South Africa. This version is broadcast on TV3 Ghana and also features Steve Harvey at the helm. Australian rules are used (four players per family) with only four rounds (double money in round three and triple in round four), and the family leading after four rounds plays Fast Money for $5,000. Both families receive $5 per point and a Fast Money loss awards $15 per point. A Botswanan version would also be produced in South Africa.
