= MasterChef Myanmar season 1 =

First season of MasterChef Myanmar

MasterChef Myanmar
- Season 1
- Judges: Michel Louis Meca; U Ye Htut Win; Daw Phyu Phyu Tin
- No. of contestants: 20
- Winner: Tin Tin Oo
- Runner-up: Aung Wai Phyo

Release
- Original network: MRTV-4
- Original release: September 9, 2018 – January 20, 2019

Season chronology
- Next → Season 2

The first season of Burmese competitive reality TV cooking show MasterChef Myanmar ran from September 9, 2018, to January 20, 2019, on MRTV-4. Tin Tin Oo was the winner of this season. The host of this season was Kaung Htet Zaw and the judges were Michel Louis Meca, U Ye Htut Win and Daw Phyu Phyu Tin.

== Top 20 ==
Contestant	Age	Home town	Status
Tin Tin Oo	43	Yangon	Winner
Aung Wai Phyo	28	Yangon	Runner-up
Nilar Aung Win	28	Yangon	Eliminated 18th
Phyo Thurain Oo	28	Yangon	Eliminated 17th
May Phyo Thi	28	Yangon	Eliminated 16th
Khant Zaw Oo	34	Mawlamyine	Eliminated 15th
Aye Aye Thein	41	Yangon	Eliminated 14th
Thiha Min Thway	18	Yangon	Eliminated 13rd
Sa Wai Yan Oo	24	Yangon	Eliminated 12nd
Htet Myat Oo	23	Wundwin	Eliminated 11th
Kyawt Kay Thi Aung	26	Mandalay	Eliminated 10th
Khin Cho Mar	49	Yangon	Eliminated 9th
Dawn Nwalt Nwalt Win	59	Yangon	Eliminated 8th
Htain Lin Maung	28	Yangon	Eliminated 7th
Zar Zar Aye	34	Yangon	Eliminated 6th
Nang Aye Aye Than	26	Yangon	Eliminated 5th
Win Zaw Win	44	Yangon	Eliminated 4th
Phyo Arkar Hein	29	Yangon	Eliminated 3rd
Thandar Aye	42	Yangon	Eliminated 2nd
Saw Zin Moe	N/A	Yangon	Eliminated 1st
