= Kaung Htet Zaw =

Burmese television host

- ကောင်းထက်ဇော်
- Born: Kaung Htet Zaw; June 16, 1986 (age 40); Yangon, Myanmar
- Other name: Ko Kaung Gyi
- Education: Dagon University
- Occupations: Television host, MC
- Years active: 2011–present

Kaung Htet Zaw (Burmese: ကောင်းထက်ဇော်; born 16 June 1986) is a Burmese television host and MC. He is best known for hosting in notable Channel 7 TV programs, Family Feud, The Money Drop Myanmar, "Let's Go & Eat" and MRTV-4 TV programs, MasterChef Myanmar season 1 and Dancing with the Stars Myanmar.

== Early life ==
Kaung Htet Zaw was born on 16 June 1986 in Yangon, Myanmar.

== Career ==
Kaung Htet Zaw acted in many TV commercials including Vitacap, Shwe Na Gar Paung Way and so on. He worked as a brand ambassador for Vitacap.

== Television programs ==
- Family Feud Myanmar (2016–2022)
- The Money Drop Myanmar (2017–present)
- MasterChef Myanmar (2018)
- Dancing with the Stars Myanmar (2019)
- Let's Go and Eat (2019–present)
- At Home (2021)
- Don't Forget the Lyrics Myanmar (2024–present)
