= Miss World Myanmar =

Beauty pageant

- မယ်မြန်မာ ကမ္ဘာ
- Formation: 2014
- Type: Beauty pageant
- Headquarters: Yangon
- Location: Myanmar
- Members: Miss World; Miss Cosmo; Miss Global
- Official language: Burmese
- National Director: Htoo Ant Lwin
- Website: Official page

Miss World Myanmar previously known as Miss Myanmar World is a national pageant to select Myanmar's representative to the Miss World pageant.

The reigning Miss World Myanmar is Khisa Khin.

== Titleholders ==
Year	Edition	Date	Miss World Myanmar	Runners up				Final venue	Host city	Entrants
Year	Edition	Date	Miss World Myanmar	First	Second	Third	Fourth	Final venue	Host city	Entrants
2014	1st	September 27	Wyne Lay (Yangon Region) Yangon	Khin Yadanar Hein (Yangon Region) Yangon	Htet Htet Htun (Yangon Region) Yangon	Not awarded	Not awarded	Chatrium Hotel Royal Lake	Yangon	19
2015	2nd	December 19	Khin Yadanar Thein Myint (Mandalay Region) Mandalay	Maureen Lu San (Kachin State) Myitkyina	Nan Sandar Hla Htun (Shan State) Mongpawn	Not awarded	Not awarded	Myanmar Event Park (M.E.P)	Yangon	20
2016	3rd	June 4	Myat Thiri Lwin (Yangon Region) Yangon	M Ja Seng (Kachin State) Myitkyina	La Yaute Pyar (Yangon Region) Yangon	Not awarded	Not awarded	Chatrium Hotel Royal Lake	Yangon	20
2017	4th	June 10	Ei Kyawt Khaing (Rakhine State) Thandwe	Ja Seng Ing (Kachin State) Myitkyina	Ei Nu Wai (Rakhine State) Ramree	Not awarded	Not awarded	Myanmar Event Park (M.E.P)	Yangon	20
2018	5th	July 14	Han Thi (Yangon Region) South Okkalapa	Lin Kalayar Oo (Mandalay Region) Mandalay	Ya Mone (Yangon Region) Yangon	Not awarded	Not awarded	Yay Kuu Amplified Broadcast Station	Yangon	20
No competition between 2020 and 2022
2023	6th	October 1	Yoon Theint Theint Nway (Shan State) Pindaya	Thandar Soe (Rakhine State) Sittwe	Zan Htate Htar (Yangon Region) Yangon	May Mon (Shan State) Kengtung	Thet Htar Khin (Mandalay Region) Mandalay	Hexagon Complex	Yangon	15
No competition in 2024
2025	7th	March 7	Khisa Khin	Nan Hak Hom	May Nu Zan	Han Su Khin Khin	Saw Myat Ei Khaing	Sedona Hotel	Yangon	

=== Winners by City/Town ===
City/Town	Titles	Winning Years
Yangon	6	1960, 2014, 2016, 2017, 2018, 2019
(Shan State) Pindaya	1	2023
Mandalay	1	2015

== International pageants ==
=== Miss World ===
Color keys

- : Declared as Winner
- : Ended as Runner-up or Top 5
- : Ended as one of the finalists (Top 10)
- : Ended as one of the semi-finalists (Top 20)
- : Ended as special awards winner

Year	Representative	Residence	Title	Placement at Miss World	Special Awards
2027	TBA	TBA	TBA	TBA	
2026	Han Theint Theint Aung	Bago Region	Miss World Myanmar 2026	Unplaced	
2025	Khisa Khin	Yangon	Miss World Myanmar 2025	Unplaced	
2023	Yoon Theint Theint Nway	Shan State	Miss World Myanmar 2023	Unplaced	
Did not compete between 2020 and 2022
2019	Khit Lin Latt Yoon	Yangon	Designated	Unplaced	
2018	Han Thi	Yangon	Miss World Myanmar 2018	Unplaced	2 Special Awards: Winner - Head to Head Challenge (Round 1); Top 25 - Beauty With A Purpose
2017	Ei Kyawt Khaing	Yangon	Miss World Myanmar 2017	Unplaced	
2016	Myat Thiri Lwin	Yangon	Miss World Myanmar 2016	Unplaced	
2015	Khin Yadanar Thein Myint	Mandalay	Miss World Myanmar 2015	Unplaced	
2014	Wyne Lay	Yangon	Miss World Myanmar 2014	Unplaced	
Miss Burma World
1960	Ma Sen Aye	Rangoon	Miss Burma World 1960	Unplaced	

== See also ==
- List of beauty pageants
