= Han Thi =

Burmese actress, model, and singer

- ဟန်သီ
- Born: Han Thi Thet Lwin; 25 July 1997 (age 29); Yangon, Myanmar
- Education: Stamford International University; New York Film Academy
- Occupations: Actress; Singer; Model
- Height: 1.73 m (5 ft 8 in)
- Beauty pageant titleholder
- Title: Miss Supranational Myanmar 2014; Miss World Myanmar 2018
- Years active: 2012–present
- Hair color: Dark Brown
- Eye color: Black
- Major competitions: Miss Supranational Myanmar 2014; Miss Supranational 2014; (Top 10); Miss World Myanmar 2018; (Winner); Miss World 2018; (Unplaced)
- Website: https://www.hanthi.com

Han Thi (Burmese: ဟန်သီ; born Han Thi Thet Lwin on 25 July 1997) is a Burmese actress, singer, model and beauty pageant title holder. She was crowned the Miss World Myanmar 2018 and represented Myanmar at the Miss World 2018 and previously crowned the Miss Supranational Myanmar 2014 and represented Myanmar at the Miss Supranational 2014.

== Early life and education ==
Han Thi was born on 25 July 1997 in Yangon, Myanmar. She is an ethnic Burmese/Chinese descent. She has one younger brother. She is currently studying at Stamford International University and also educated in Acting associate degree at New York Film Academy in 2016.

== Pageantry ==
=== New Face of Myanmar ===
Han competed in the New Face of Myanmar Contest 2012 which was held on 24 November 2012 by Mizon Myanmar and Korea Model Association. She won Ms. Face of Myanmar award and represented Myanmar at the Asia New Star Model Contest 2013.

=== Miss Golden Land Myanmar 2014 ===
After competing in the Asia New Star Model Contest 2013, she joined the second edition of Miss Golden Land Myanmar which was held on 21 August 2014 at the Myanmar Convention Center, Yangon, Myanmar. At the end of the event, she was crowned Miss Supranational Myanmar 2014 and represented Myanmar at Miss Supranational 2014.

=== Miss Supranational 2014 ===
She represented Myanmar at the Miss Supranational 2014 pageant which was held on 5 December 2014 in Krynica-Zdrój, Poland, along with beauties from 98 other nations. She was placed in the top 10 and won the continental titles for Miss Asia and Oceania and Miss Internet Award.

=== Miss World Myanmar 2018 ===
She competed in the Miss World Myanmar 2018 which was held on 14 July 2018 in Yay Kuu Amplified Broadcast Centre, Yangon. She became the winner of Miss World Myanmar 2018 after the competition.

=== Miss World 2018 ===
Han represented Myanmar at the Miss World 2018 pageant in Sanya, China, and finished as the group 11 head to head challenge winner.

== Career ==
=== Music career ===
Han Thi began her music career in 2015, after the competition in Miss Supranational 2014. She launched her debut solo album, Ma Chit Tat Thay Buu (မချစ်တတ်သေးဘူး) on 26 July 2015.

=== Acting career ===
Han Thi started her acting career in 2016. She made her acting debut with a leading role in the Burmese big screen film Alwan Dannaryi with actor Arr Thit and Ei Chaw Po.

== Discography ==
=== Solo albums ===
- Ma Chit Tat Thay Buu (မချစ်တတ်သေးဘူး) (2015)

== Filmography ==
=== Film (Cinema) ===
- Alwan Dannaryi (အလွမ်းဒဏ္ဍာရီ)
