= Forever Group =

Media broadcasting company Myanmar

- Industry: Broadcasting
- Founded: 1996; 30 years ago
- Founder: Win Maw
- Headquarters: Yangon, Myanmar
- Area served: Myanmar
- Key people: Win Maw; Thein Tun Aung
- Products: MRTV-4, Channel 7, MMDC, Mandalay FM, and Pyone Play
- Website: Forever Group on Facebook

Forever Group is a Burmese private media broadcasting company, with its headquarters in Yangon, Myanmar. Forever Group is known for its close ties to the Burmese military.

== History ==
Forever Group was founded in 1996 in Myanmar by Win Maw, a former sailor who established the company to import and distribute computer and computer components. In 2004, it launched a national free-to-air television channel, MRTV-4, as a joint venture with Myanmar's Ministry of Information and state-owned Myanmar Radio and Television. The joint venture was intended to become a pro-military outlet to counter local and foreign independent media. In 2008, it launched Mandalay FM, a radio station.

In 2016, it partnered with Thaicom to boost HDTV coverage on a Thai satellite. In 2018, French-owned CANAL+ and Forever Group launched Canal+ (Myanmar) in the Burmese market. In 2019, Forever Group produced Dancing with the Stars Myanmar, which premiered in October 2019. In the aftermath of the 2021 Myanmar coup d'état, Forever Group has organized a media propaganda campaign to counter anti-coup sentiment in the country.

== Leadership ==
Forever Group is led by Win Maw, and his deputy Thein Tun Aung, a graduate of the 22nd intake of the Defence Services Academy.

== Subsidiaries ==
Forever Group owns several national television channels, radio stations, and streaming services, including MRTV-4, Channel 7, MMDC, Canal+ (Myanmar), Mandalay FM, and Pyone Play.
