= Channel 7 (Burmese TV channel) =

- Country: Myanmar
- Broadcast area: Myanmar
- Headquarters: Yangon

Programming
- Picture format: 1080i (16:9 HDTV)

Ownership
- Owner: Forever Group
- Sister channels: MRTV-4; Reader's Channel; Maharbawdi; 4 EDU

History
- Launched: 11 May 2012; 14 years ago February 2014; 12 years ago (HD)

Links
- Website: Official website

Availability

Terrestrial
- Digital terrestrial television (Myanmar): Channel 4 (HD); RF Channel 27 522 MHz
- MRTV (Myanmar): Channel 12 (SD); RF Channel 31 554 MHz
- Thaicom 6 (Thailand): 3730 H 15000 (SD)
- Thaicom 6 KU (Thailand): 12728 V 30000 (SD)
- CANAL+ (Myanmar): Channel 36 (SD)
- Softtech M1 (Myanmar): Channel 14 (SD)
- GMM Z (Thailand): Channel 212 (SD)
- Infosat (Thailand): Channel 112 (SD)

Streaming media
- Pyone Play: Watch live

Channel 7 is a Burmese free-to-air television channel jointly operated by MRTV-4. It is owned by Forever Group. It launched in May 2012, and at that time, the channel broadcasts between 7 am and 11 pm. The channel now broadcasts 24 hours daily.

Channel 7 also broadcasts foreign series with Burmese subtitles and dubbing.

== Programming ==
=== Television shows ===
- Family Feud Myanmar
- The Money Drop Myanmar
- Eain Mat Sone Yar (အိမ်မက်ဆုံရာ)

=== Television series ===
- Flowers and Butterflies
- Happy Beach

== See also ==
- Media of Burma
- Communications in Burma
- MRTV-4
- MITV
