= Galaxy Star =

Burmese singing competition

- Also known as: Galaxy Star Myanmar
- Genre: Reality television
- Presented by: Kaung Htet Zaw; San Thit La
- Judges: Graham; Pho Ka; Sung Thin Par; Phyu Phyu Kyaw Thein; J-Me
- Country of origin: Myanmar
- Original language: Burmese
- No. of seasons: 1

Production
- Production location: Myanmar
- Production company: Namin Company

Original release
- Network: MRTV-4
- Release: 7 April 2017

Galaxy Star is a singing competition television series broadcast in Myanmar on MRTV-4. The first season of Galaxy Star began airing on 7 April 2017, and has air weekly on Friday evenings at 9:15 on MRTV-4 Channel through September 2017. The series is produced by JBJ Entertainment, in collaboration with Samsung.

== Judges ==
The judges of the first season include notable Burmese musicians, namely Graham, Pho Ka, Sung Thin Par, Phyu Phyu Kyaw Thein, and J-Me. Korean musicians and artists, namely Kim Hyung-suk, Daehyun of B.A.P (South Korean band), and Minzy, served as guest judges during the first season's Korea Training Camp mission.

== Top 10 Contestants ==
- Naw Sel Sel Eh Doe - top 10
- Alienz - top 8
- Mee No - top 10
- Marco - top 8
- John Thanga - top 8
- Saw Eh Say Moo - top 5
- Honey Tun Wai - top 5
- Lar Dint Htar Yi - top 5
- Key - runner up
- Nay Min Eain - winner

== See also ==
- Melody World
- Myanmar Idol
- Television in Myanmar
