= Project K =

Project K may refer to:

- Soviet Project K nuclear tests, a series of high-altitude nuclear tests
- Project K (band), a seven-member boy band from Myanmar
- Project Kalki, a limited Indian comic book series published by Virgin Comics in 2008
- Project K (film), the working title for the 2024 Indian Telugu science fiction film Kalki 2898 AD

== See also ==
- K Project (disambiguation)
