= Hlwan Moe =

Hlwan Moe လွှမ်းမိုး
- Born: Soe Soe; 27 June 1954; Rangoon, Burma
- Died: 10 July 2001 (aged 47) Yangon, Myanmar
- Occupations: Singer-songwriter; composer
- Instrument: Vocals
- Years active: 1975-2001

Hlwan Moe (Burmese: လွှမ်းမိုး) was a popular Burmese songwriter, composer and singer. He is known for a number of popular hit songs, including "Maiden in My Heart" (ရင်တွင်းမေ), "It's Like This in the Neighborhood" (ရပ်ကွက်ထဲမှာ ဒီလိုပဲ), "Teacher" (ဆရာမ) and "Falling Raindrops'" (မိုးစက်တင်လေ).

Before going solo, he performed in a music band and gained success producing the band's songs.

== Early life ==
Hlwan Moe was born on 27 June 1954 in Rangoon, Burma (now Yangon, Myanmar).

== Death and legacy ==
Hlwan Moe died in a car crash on 10 July 2001.

In 2016, popular Burmese singers, including Marazza, Graham, R Zarni, Zaw Paing, Phoe Kar, Nanda Ayeya, Nyan Lin Aung, Phyo Pyae Sone, Aung Htet, and Aung Myint Myat, staged a concert dedicated to Hlwan Moe's classics. In 2017, Banya Han covered Hlwan Moe's classic songs in an album. In 2019, the Burmese boy band Project K covered Hlwan Moe's classic, "That Yangon Lad is Me" (ရန်ကုန်သားလေးကျွန်တော်), at Yangon City FM's 18th Annual Music Awards

== Discography ==
1. ဟင်္သာတို့ရဲ့နန်းတော်ရှေ့
2. ပျော်တာပေါ့ အမေရယ် (၁၉၈၁)
3. ပရိသတ်ချစ်သောတေးများ(၂)
4. လက်ရွေးစင်တေး
5. လက်ရွေးစင်တေးများ - ၂
6. ငွေရတု အကောင်းဆုံးတေးများ(၃) (၂၀၀၁)
7. ငွေရတုမှတ်တမ်း အကောင်းဆုံးတေး(၂)(၂၀၀၁)
8. ငွေရတုအကောင်းဆုံးတေးများ (၄) (၂၀၀၁)
9. တေးပုလဲ ၈၅
10. မောင်မေးမယ်မေ (၁၉၈၈)
11. နှလုံးသားကိုနီကာ (၂၀၀၀)
12. ကျွန်တော်နှင့်လွှမ်းမိုး
13. လက်ရွေးစင် (မူရင်း)
14. သျှီ
15. ဆရာမ (၁၉၈၀)
16. တိတ်တခိုးချစ်သူ (၂၀၀၂)(သိန်းတန်(မြန်မာပြည်)၏တေးသီချင်းများကို ပြန်လည်သီဆိုထားသည်)
17. ပရိသတ်ချစ်သောတေးများ (၁)
18. မဟာဒဏ္ဍာရီ (၁၉၉၂)
19. မိုးစက်တင်လေ
20. မနှင်းဆီ (၁၉၇၉)
21. ရန်ကုန်သားလေး ကျနော်ပါ (၁၉၇၅)
22. လက်ရွေးစင်တေးများ
23. ကော်ဖီဆိုင်အိပ်မက်
24. ငွေရတုမှတ်တမ်း(၁) (၂၀၀၀)
25. ပြောပါရစေ
26. အလှူရှင် (ချိုပြုံးနှင့် တွဲဖက်၍)
27. မအေးကိုချစ်လို့ပါ (၁၉၇၇)
28. ကားပြိုင်ပွဲ (မို့မို့မြင့်အောင် နှင့်တွဲဖက်၍)(၁၉၈၀)
29. ကျောင်းပြေးချစ်သူ (မေရွက်ဝါ နှင့်တွဲဖက်၍)
30. မင်းလိုလူစား အများကြီး
31. ပန်းနုနှင်းဆီ (၁၉၉၅)
32. ဖြေ (၁၉၉၀)

== Myanmar Country Music Albums ==
1. ပွဲကြိုက်ခင် (၁၉၈၆)
2. ကျွန်တော်တင်တဲ့ရွှေမင်းသမီး (၁၉၈၇)
3. ချစ်ကြိုးမဲ့လေတံခွန် (၁၉၈၉)
4. ဂုဏ် (၁၉၉၀)
5. ရွှေခြည်ငွေခြည်ပိုးကြိုးသီ (မာမာအေး နှင့်တွဲဖက်၍)(၁၉၉၁)
6. အဝိဇ္ဇာ၏ပြယုဂ်များ (၁၉၉၃)
7. တစ်ဆောင်းသစ်ပြန်ပြီ (၁၉၉၃)
8. ဆောင်းနှင်းမြူနဲ့ကိုယ့်ချစ်သူ (တွံတေးသိန်းတန် ၏ သီချင်းများအား ပြန်လည်ခံစားသီဆိုမှု) (၁၉၉၃)
9. ဂန္တဝင်မှတ်တိုင်များ (၁၉၉၃)
10. ကြည်နူးဖွယ်မင်္ဂလာတေးသီဖြာ (နီနီဝင်းရွှေ နှင့်တွဲဖက်၍) (၁၉၉၃)
11. မေ့အချစ်မြား (၁၉၉၆)
12. ကြည်နူးဖွယ်အကောင်းဆုံးဓမ္မတေးသီချင်းများ (၂၀၀၀)
13. စိတ်တိုင်းဖြစ်ရစေ့မယ်ကိုသိပ်ခက် (စိုးစန္ဒာထွန်းနှင့်တွဲဖက်၍) (၂၀၀၀)
1. ရွှေပန်းရည်ဘဏ်တိုက်(၁) (နီနီဝင်းရွှေ နှင့်တွဲဖက်၍) (၂၀၀၀)
2. စိတ်ကြိုက်လက်ရွေးစင် (၂၀၀၁)
