= Lake Pyar =

Burmese television series

- Poster
- Burmese: လိပ်ပြာ
- Genre: Crime, Action
- Created by: Canal+ (Myanmar)
- Directed by: Nyan Htin
- Starring: Pan Yaung Chel; Khar Ra; Myat Noe Aye; Aung Ye Htike; Charlie; Min Oo
- Opening theme: Enemies of You by Youn Ni Ko (season 1); A Phyu Yaung Htaung Khyauk by Raymond (season 2)
- Country of origin: Myanmar
- Original language: Burmese
- No. of seasons: 2
- No. of episodes: 16

Production
- Production location: Myanmar
- Running time: 60 minutes
- Production companies: Bonanza Production; Canal+ (Myanmar)

Original release
- Network: Canal+ Zat Lenn
- Release: 17 October 2019 – 18 March 2021

Lake Pyar (Burmese: လိပ်ပြာ) is a Burmese crime detective action television series. It aired on Canal+ Zat Lenn, on every Thursday at 20:00. Season 1: A Sword of Truth (Burmese: အမှန်တရားရဲ့ဓားတစ်လက်) aired from October 17 to December 5, 2019 for 8 episodes and season 2: Light and Dark (Burmese: အလင်းနဲ့အမှောင်) aired from January 28 to March 18, 2021 for 8 episodes.

== Synopsis ==
It is about the case of a female lieutenant colonel who is good at drawing conclusions. But what happens when Lake Pyar later finds out that her aunt is the killer of her mother, and what if her father and mother are notorious criminals in the notorious Mafia?

== Cast ==
- Pan Yaung Chel as Lake Pyar
- Khar Ra as Htun Ko
- Myat Noe Aye as Myat Noe
- Aung Ye Htike as Paing Soe
- Charlie as Myo Min
- Min Oo as U Arkar

== Award ==
Best Theme Song or Title Theme Award for season 1 (Asian Academy Creative Award 2020)
