= Khin Myat Mon =

Burmese singer

Khin Myat Mon (Burmese: ခင်မြတ်မွန်) is a Burmese singer, harmonist and vocal trainer. She is best known for the popular music she made in the 1980s. Because of her 30 year music career, she served as a judge on national televised singing competitions.

== Career ==
She started her music career in 1974 as a singer and harmonist in local bands. In 1984, she became the lead vocalist of the New Wave Band. In 1992, she released a solo mixtape Bar Alo Shi Lal featuring Htoo Ein Thin, Aung Yin, and Ye Thein. She had music collaborations with Iron Cross, Emperor, and Oasis.

She was a judge on major televised singing competitions Karaoke World Championships Myanmar, Eain Mat Sone Yar, Starless Sky, Telenor Music Contest and many national singing contests. She works as a vocal trainer and opened a vocal training class in Yangon. She discovered and produced more than 30 singers including Wyne Su Khine Thein and Khoon Sint Nay Chi.

== Personal life ==
She married songwriter Saw Khu Hser, but they divorced one year after the birth of their first son Raymond in 1989. Her second marriage was to a sailor and they had a daughter, Lapyae Gabyar, who is also a singer.
