= Pan Yaung Chel =

Pan Yaung Chel ပန်းရောင်ခြယ်
- Born: Pan Yaung Chel; 14 January 1996 (age 30); Yangon, Myanmar
- Genres: Pop, R&B
- Occupations: Actress/Singer-Songwriter
- Instruments: Piano
- Years active: 2015–present
- Website: www.panyaungchel.com

Pan Yaung Chel (Burmese: ပန်းရောင်ခြယ်; born 14 January 1996) is an Anglo-Burmese actress-singer and songwriter best known for her pop songs, films and commercials. She debuted as an artist with the album "Wake Up Daddy!" produced together with her father Graham, a pop legend of Myanmar. After several years, she took on her first acting role and from then on, continues to work as an actress in films and television series, as well as a pop and RnB artist. She was born in Myanmar, and raised in both Myanmar and Australia.

== Life and career ==
=== 1996–2013: Early life and living abroad ===
Pan Yaung Chel was born to Graham and Thin Zar Oo in Yangon, Myanmar on 14 January 1996. She became the elder daughter of her family when her little sister Pan Thun Chel was born on the same day as her birthday in 2001. She grew up in Myanmar and studied in international schools in Yangon. She released her first ever song, "Twinkle Twinkle Little Star", in Yin Mar Record Label's Children's Songs album at the age of 9.

Later at the age of around 11, Pan Yaung Chel and her family moved to Perth, Australia for her and her little sister's education. In 2012, when Pan Yaung Chel was still in high school, her father, mother and her little sister returned to Myanmar while she stayed behind in Australia to continue her education. She went to continue her secondary studies at St Brigid's College, an independent Roman Catholic, day and boarding school for girls, where she graduated as the class of 2013. In March 2013, Graham held his solo concert in Yangon, she sang Adele's Someone Like You at her father's concert, where she was praised for her singing abilities.

=== 2014–2017: Career beginnings with "Wake Up Daddy!" ===
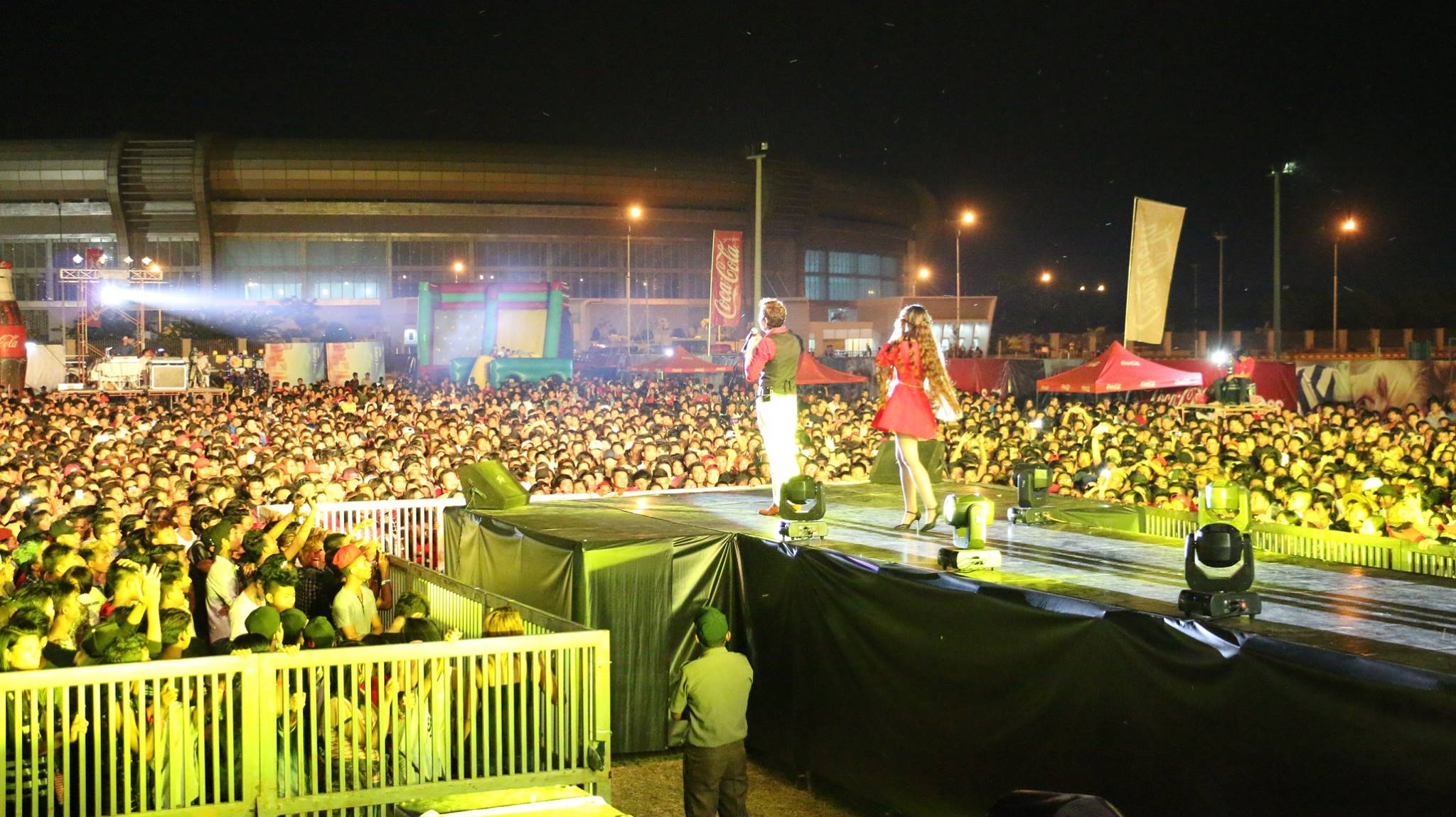
Graham and Pan Yaung Chel performing for Coca-Cola Festival 2016

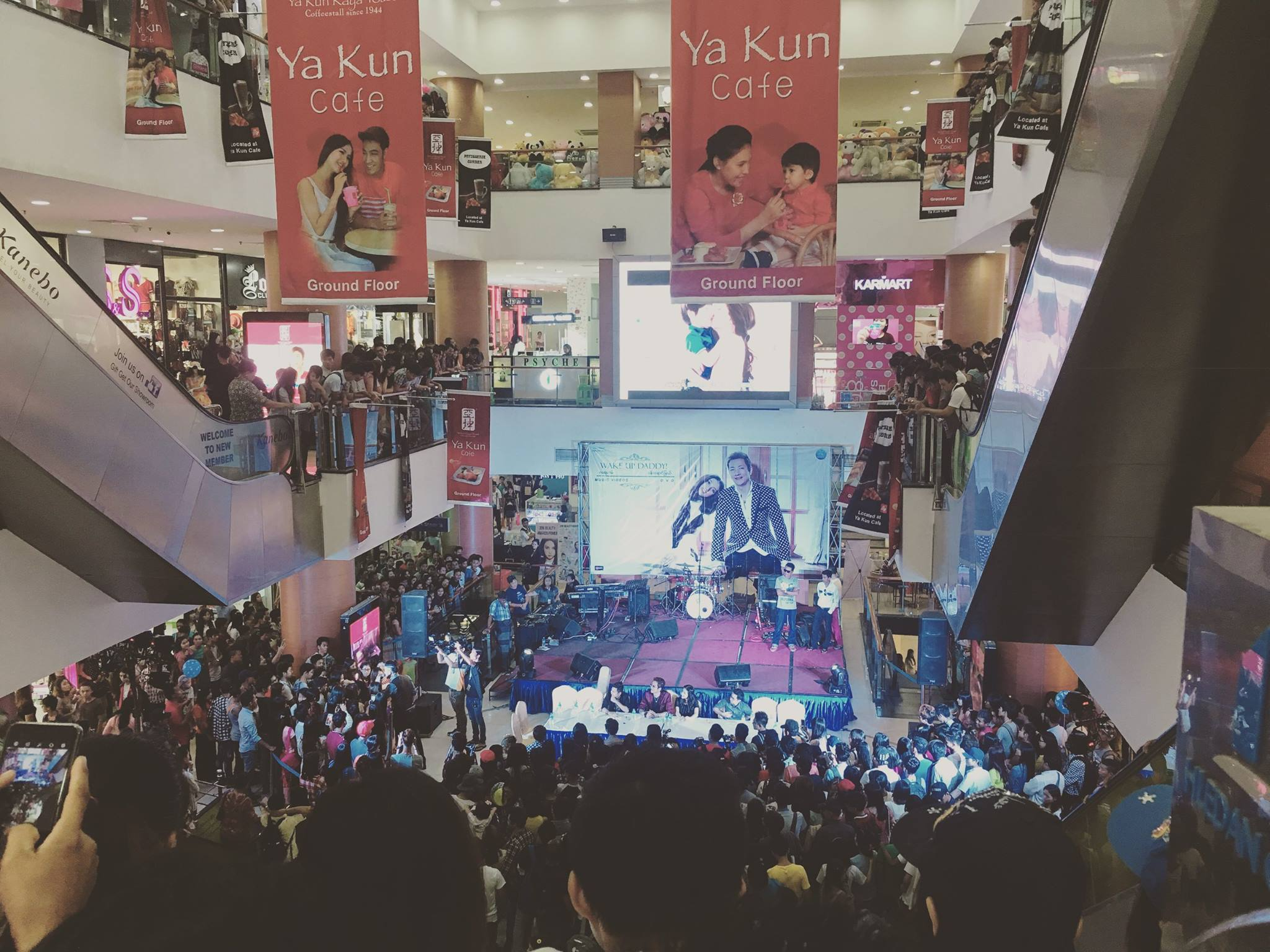
"Wake Up Daddy!" DVD Album Signing Event (January 2017)

After high school she went onto study architecture at The University of Western Australia. But before she began studying at the university, Pan Yaung Chel took a gap year in 2014 where she worked on her debut album "Wake Up Daddy!" together with her father, Graham.

The most popular track of the album was "Wake Up Daddy!" which was loved by many, from children to teenagers, to the adults. It was known for being the song that children fans of both Graham and Pan Yaung Chel sing to their fathers in the mornings when they wake them up. The song was based on the real life experience Pan Yaung Chel and her family had in Australia, while they were living there. The DVD of the album came out nearly two years later, on 21 December 2016, with 14 music videos inside.

=== 2018–present: New music ===
Pan Yaung Chel has been stating in her current interviews that she is hoping to release her first solo album soon. She released her first single for 2018 – "Butterflies", written together with her father, on 9 February through her Facebook page and YouTube channel. Her second single for 2018 came out on 16 March, titled "You Set Me Free" and was written by herself. Five days later, she also released a dance practice video of the song on her Facebook page and YouTube channel. On 17 November 2018, Pan Yaung Chel released a music video for her first single "Let It Go" which is one of the tracks in her upcoming solo album. The music video became widely popular since the day she released it on her official Facebook page and YouTube channel, and was praised for the quality and input of the cast and production team involved in this music video. The music video was an action-based music video where Pan Yaung Chel got to show her acting skills and a tough side of her for the first time to the public by playing the character of a police woman who was in love with a drug dealer, who was played by Daung. Many of her fans were excited to see the full music video ever since she dropped the teaser 5 days before she released the full version, and suggested her to start considering acting in films.

In 2020, Pan Yaung released her first ever solo album titled "Solo", which consists of 10 audio tracks, 4 music videos and 6 lyric videos. The 10 tracks also include her earlier released singles, "You Set Me Free", "Butterflies" and "Let It Go", which were all composed by her. Pan Yaung also released a limited deluxe edition album set, which consisted of 3 "Solo" merchandises, and the signed album with CD and DVD inside.

=== 2019: The beginning of an acting career ===
Pan Yaung Chel's acting career began with her first ever film work named "Lake Pyar" - a Canal+ original series, which began airing nationwide on 17 October 2019, in which she played the character of Lake Pyar. "Lake Pyar" is a crime detective series written and directed by Nyan Htin about a female junior detective by the name of Lake Pyar (which means butterfly) and her co-workers, solving criminal cases in the city of Yangon, Myanmar. Season 1 of "Lake Pyar" consists of eight episodes and each episode has a different criminal case. "Lake Pyar" became popular and well-loved for its story, casts, the quality of production, and for it being one of the few films/series in Myanmar that has a female hero character, or in other words, is led by a female actress. CANAL+ took a huge risk casting a singer as the lead for its series. But with her first-ever role, Pan Yaung Chel was awarded the National Winner of Myanmar for Best Actress In A Leading Role for the Asian Academy Creative Awards - one of Asia-Pacific's most prestigious awards. In recent interviews, Pan Yaung Chel said she will also start working on other films in 2020 which will go on the big screens later in the coming years. Season 2 of "Lake Pyar" began airing on CANAL+ on 28 January 2021.

Pan Yaung continued to focus on her acting career for the next few years and worked on the popular television series "Grieving Moe", which gained her another National Award for Best Actress In A Leading Role at the Asian Academy Creative Awards, making her the only actress in Myanmar to win the title twice, and "Sparkle Hearts", which is said to be the tv series with the highest budget in Myanmar for the past several years.

In the same year, she filmed her first feature film titled "The Misty Cloud" which was released in theaters nationwide on the 1st of May 2026. The following years of 2024 and 2025, Pan Yaung worked on her second and third feature, "Real Man" and "I Wanna Be Your Lobster...", which both films were released in the theaters nationwide, also in May of 2026 – releasing all three films she shot in three years time, in the same month. I Wanna Be Your Lobster... has made history as the Myanmar film with the highest number of international film festival selections to date. The film has been showcased at international film festivals across eight countries — South Korea, Vietnam, the United Kingdom, Hong Kong, Thailand, Belarus, Laos, and the United States. Building on its international festival success, I Wanna Be Your Lobster... is set to begin its theatrical distribution across several Asian countries in 2027, marking another important step towards bringing Burmese cinema to audiences around the world.

== Brand Endorsements/ Brand Ambassadorships ==
Pan Yaung Chel is also well known for being the face of many international brands. The first brand she worked as the Brand Endorser was for Dutch Mill. She worked with Dutch Mill for a year from the end of 2016 until the end of 2017. She worked as Sunsilk's first ever, and the only Burmese, Brand Ambassador in history from 2017 till 2022. She worked as Nescafé's Brand Ambassador for a year from June 2017 until June 2018 and their campaign was also promoted nationwide.

Pan Yaung Chel worked as Samsung's Brand Ambassador for 9 consecutive years from 2017 till 2025, making her the only celebrity Samsung appointed as their B.A for the longest time. She worked with Cute Press, a famous Thai cosmetic brand, as their first Burmese Brand Ambassador from 2017 till 2025. Collaborations with the brand can be seen since in her single "Butterflies" where it endorsed Cute Press's Magic Cover Foundation Powder in the music video.https://www.facebook.com/momolaytv/videos/1989283851313701/?hc_ref=ARQ7DU-0z47aVZWPwOhcTCgtrJkgBXXvJyYpy6LHdS_-POzpeZxdjENNRIOY3FUFiN8|publisher=Momolay. Pan Yaung Chel and her family began representing Mitsubishi Motors as their first ever Brand Ambassadors in Myanmar, from September 2019 till 2021. Other brands she worked with for television commercials and print ads, but not as their Brand Ambassador includes – Estee Lauder, Armani Exchange, Emporio Armani, Manulife, MAMA noodles, Hearty Heart cosmetics, 100 PLUS isotonic drink, Cufo throat lozenges, Gery cracker, Gery crunch roll, Dr. Somchai, Sunplay, Hydro+ and many more.

Pan Yaung Chel is the only female celebrity in Myanmar to collaborate with VISA and print her face on VISA cards to produce prepaid VISA cards for sale. On 15 August 2020, UAB bank launched Myanmar's first ever VISA Celebrity Gift Card together with Pan Yaung Chel and VISA. The cards came in four different designs and each came with its own theme personally developed by Pan Yaung. These prepaid VISA gift cards can be purchased in stores and online, and can be used throughout the world, both online and offline, anywhere VISA is available. https://www.uab.com.mm/uab-bank-partners-leading-myanmar-celebrities-pan-yeung-chel-paing-takhon-to-launch-first-ever-celebrity-gift-cards|accessdate=15

== Personal life ==
=== Religion and philanthropy ===
Pan Yaung Chel was raised Catholic, with her mother and little sister a Catholic and her father a Buddhist. She went to study at independent Catholic schools in Australia during her primary school and high school years. In December 2017 when Pope Francis visited Myanmar, the first time a pope has ever visited the country, Pan Yaung Chel and her father sang gospel songs before the public mass began. She sang Hallelujah and Be Born in Me, while Graham sang one of his own many Burmese gospel song. She also sang the Psalms during Pope Francis' Youth Mass which was held a day after the Public Mass. Pan Yaung Chel and her family frequently donates to orphanages, schools and many other charities throughout each year.

=== Language(s) ===
Pan Yaung Chel speaks her native language Burmese alongside native English and proficient Korean.

== Discography ==
=== Solo albums ===
- Wake Up Daddy! (2015)
- Solo (2020)

=== Singles ===
- Butterflies (2018)
- You Set Me Free (2018)
- Let It Go (2018)
- Lwal Ba Ma Lar (2019)
- Kyoe (2019)
- Monster (2022)
- Butterflies (2018)
- You Set Me Free (2018)
- Let it go (2018)
- Lwal Ba Ma Lar (2019)
- Kyoe (2019)
- Monster (2022)
- Taung Su (2026)

=== Songs from collaborative albums ===
- Ba Wa Ye' A Date Bal (Myit Zi Ma Go Thwar Ja Myi) (2014)
- Maung Lu Chaw (Padamyar FM) (2016)
- Dream Holiday (Cherry FM 7th Anniversary) (2017)
- Kyin Nar Chin Yel Ah Chit Yel (Sal Nhit Sal Moe) (2017)
- Ka Na Oo Pone Pyin (Sal Nhit Sal Moe) (2017)
- Tha Chin Ne' Ka Khone Lite (Thingyan Fever) (2017)
- Kat Chit Mal (April Queens) (2017)
- Amone Ni Dan (Music Soon Lan Lil' Chan – Lil' Chan) (2017)
- Shall We Meet Again (Kiss Museum – James) (2017)
- Diary (Gi Ta Bay Da – Hlwan Paing) (2017)
- Bar Kyaunt (Man Thiri 20th Anniversary) (2018)
- Arr Gyee Chit Tal (Co Py Than Zin - Hlwan Paing) (2025)

== Filmography ==
Film roles
Year	Title	Role	Notes
2026	The Cloud	Mya Le'	main role
2026	I Wanna Be Your Lobster...	Snow/May Hnin	main role
2026	Real Man	Mya Tharr Chel	main role

Television roles
Year	Title	Role	Notes
2019	Lake Pyar (Season One: The Blade of Truth)	Lake Pyar	main role
2021	Lake Pyar (Season Two: Light and Dark)	Lake Pyar	main role
2022	Paing Thu And Yamin (short film)	Yamin	main role
2022	Grieving Moe	Moe Ei Phyu	main role
2023	Sparkle Hearts	Vee	main role
2025	Forbidden Classroom	Moe Ou Tu	main role

== Awards and nominations ==
Year	Association	Category	Work	Result	Ref.
2020	Asian Academy Creative Awards	Best Actress In A Leading Role	Lake Pyar	Nominated	
2023	Asian Academy Creative Awards	Best Actress In A Leading Role	Ta Myay Myay Moe	Nominated	
