= Sparkle Hearts =

Burmese television series

- Poster
- Burmese: ရင်ထဲကြွေတဲ့ကြယ်
- Genre: Drama
- Directed by: Wai Yan Pe
- Starring: Aung Ye Lin; A Linn Yaung; Pan Yaung Chel; Poe Mamhe Thar; Moht Moht Myint Aung; Min Oo; Nay Myo Aung; Myat Kay Thi Aung
- Country of origin: Myanmar
- Original language: Burmese
- No. of episodes: 70 (30+40)

Production
- Executive producer: Nora Ko
- Cinematography: Shine Lynn; Kyaw Myo Oo
- Running time: 40 minutes
- Production company: Bonanza Production

Original release
- Network: Canal+ Zat Lenn
- Release: December 11, 2023 – April 12, 2024

Sparkle Hearts (Burmese: ရင်ထဲကြွေတဲ့ကြယ်) is a Burmese drama television series directed by Wai Yan Pe starring Aung Ye Lin, A Linn Yaung, Pan Yaung Chel, Poe Mamhe Thar, Moht Moht Myint Aung, Min Oo, Nay Myo Aung and Myat Kay Thi Aung. It was produced by Bonanza Production.

Its season 1 aired on Canal+ Zat Lenn, from December 11, 2023, to January 19, 2024, and season 2 aired from February 19, to April 12, 2024, on Mondays to Fridays, at 19:30 (MMT).

== Synopsis ==
In this series, you will see and feel the glow of love, the burning of hatred, and the competition and attacks under the lights of the magnificent fabric.

== Cast ==
- Aung Ye Lin as Alex
- A Linn Yaung as Lynn Let
- Pan Yaung Chel as Vee
- Poe Mamhe Thar as May Poe Thaw Tar
- Moht Moht Myint Aung as Daw Shwe Poe Wah
- Min Oo as U Khant Thaw
- Nay Myo Aung as U Min Htet
- Myat Kay Thi Aung as Daw Rosie Kyaw
- Bhone In Arr as Phyo Nyi
- Hillary Soe as Stella
- Yair Pi Ti as Harry
- Ingyin Phoo as Chaw Nu Nge
- Z Go Han as Rolan
- Shin Phone Pyae as Kyaw Kyaw
- Nan Eaindray as Nelly
- Wan Wang as Snow
- Kay Thi Khine Win as Ma Thae Mar
- T Saw as Ko Sai
- Li Li Kyaw Khaing as Nora
- Koon as Wai Yan Min
- San Min Hein Htut as Zaw Ye Htike
