= K Project (disambiguation) =

K Project may refer to:

- Soviet Project K nuclear tests
- K (TV series), a 2012 animated series also known as K Project
- Rez (video game), a 2001 video game which had a working title K-Project
- Project K, a Burmese boy band
- Kurohyō: Ryū ga Gotoku Shinshō, a video game codenamed Project K
