= Mee No =

Burmese singer

Mee No မီးနို
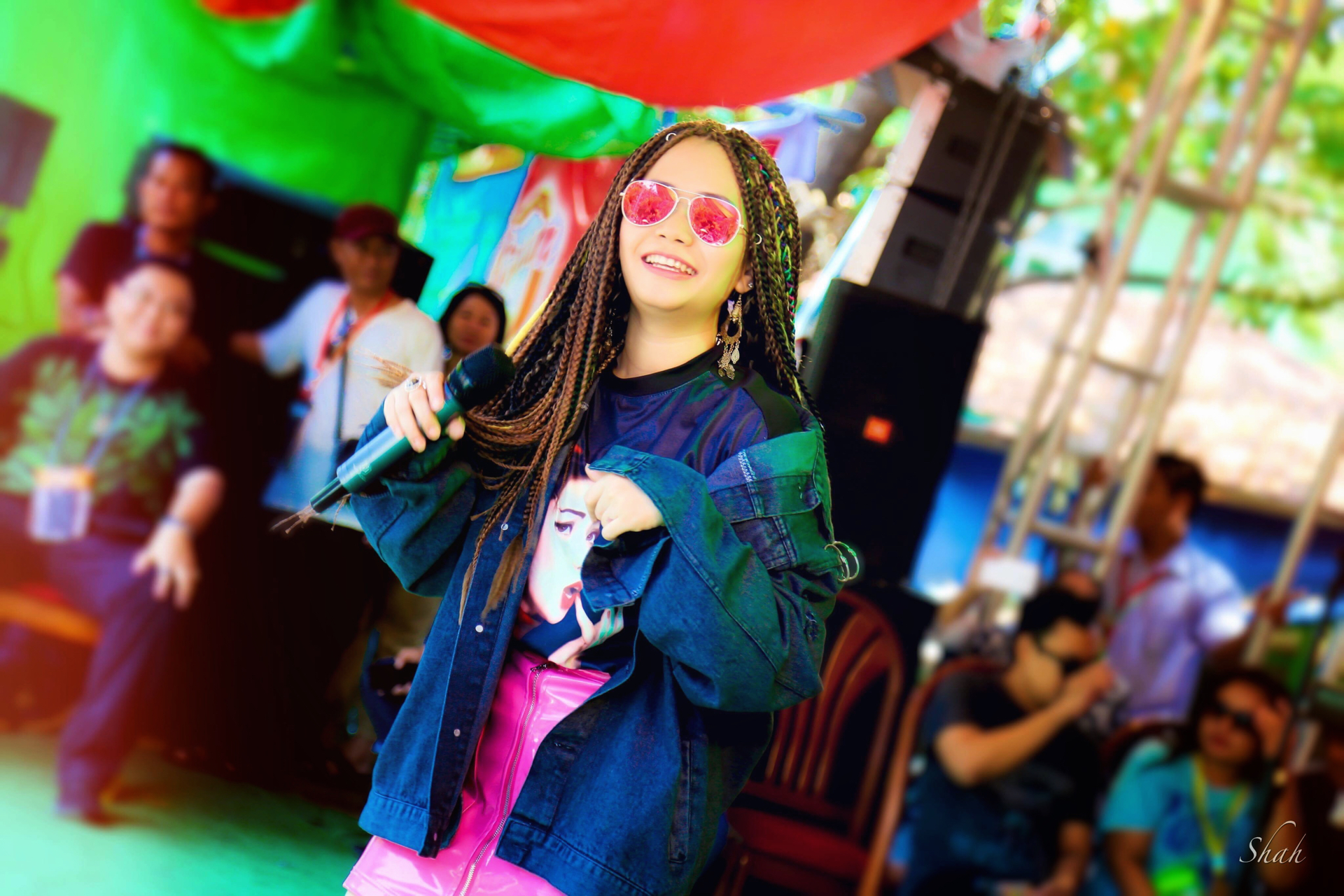

Background information
- Born: Poe Eain Phyu; 27 November 1990 (age 35); Pathein, Ayeyarwady Region, Myanmar
- Genres: Pop rock
- Occupation: Singer-songwriter
- Instruments: Vocals; Piano
- Years active: 2008–present

Mee No (Burmese: မီးနို; born Poe Eain Phyu on 27 November 1990) is a prominent contemporary Burmese singer. She gained recognition from competing in Galaxy Star and placed in the top 10.

== Early life and education ==
Mee No was born on 27 November 1990 in Pathein, Ayeyarwady Region, Myanmar to ethnic Karen-Burmese parent Richard Mg Mg Aung and his wife Noe Noe. Her father is an ethnic Karen/English/Burmese descent and her mother is an ethnic Karen. She is the only daughter. She attended high school at Basic Education High School No.1 Yankin and graduated from Dagon University with a degree in Myanmar in 2009.

== Career ==
=== Beginnings ===
At age 17, Mee No won first prize during the finals of the City FM competition, with singing "Moe Yar Thi" song by L Seng Zi.

=== 2008–2013: Competing in Melody World and collaboration ===
In 2008, she participated as a contestant in Melody World, a televised singing competition and won a third prize in level 3 competition. After, she participated in "2008 Melody World" group album with a song "Pha Yar Pay Dae Su". She also participated in many group albums including "Eain Mat Lah Da Gal Lah", "A Yin Tine Htet" and "A Dream From Sixteen Hundred Miles Away".

=== 2013–2017: Solo debut and Galaxy Star ===
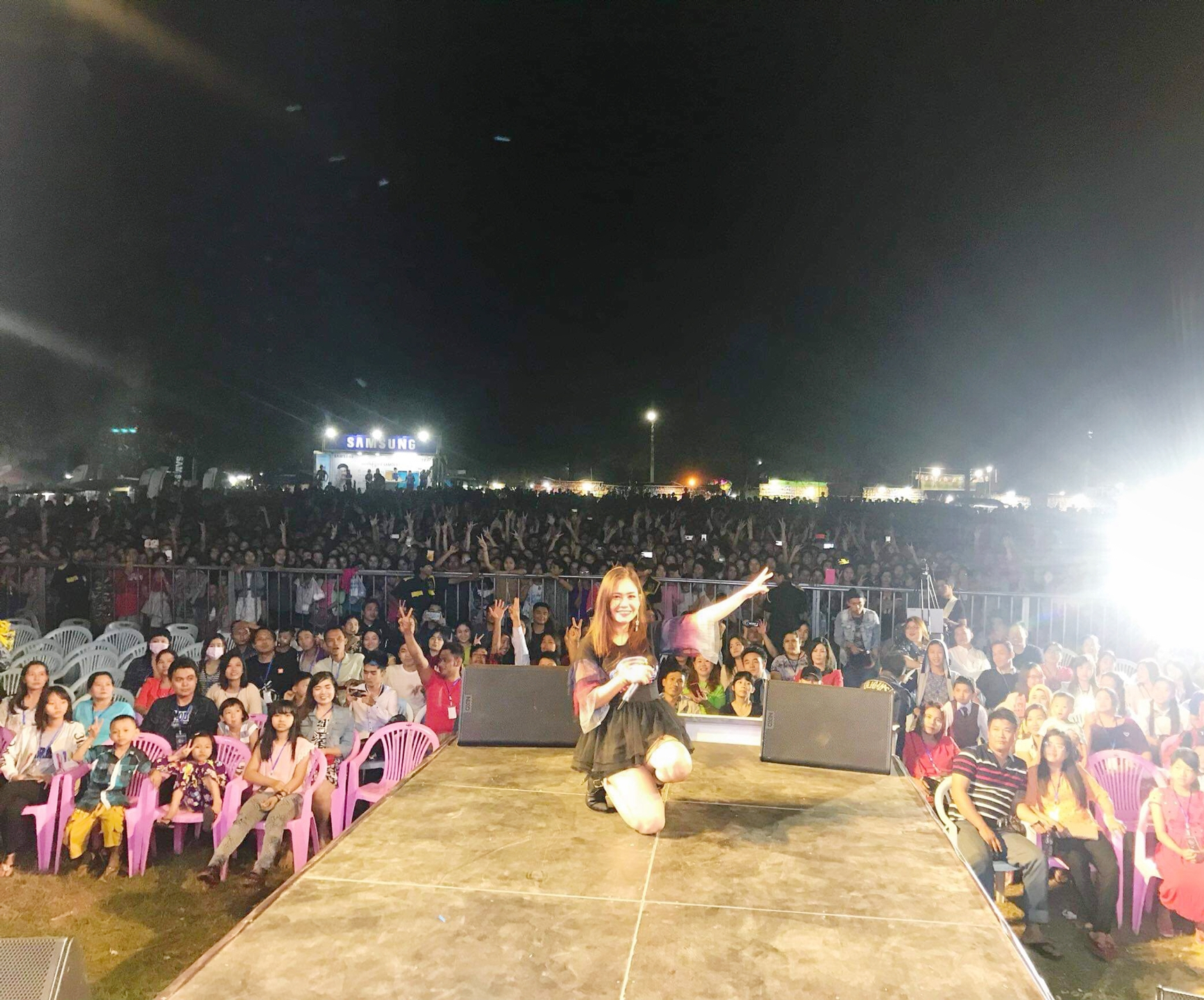
Mee No is performing in a concert

In 2013, Mee started endeavoring to be able to produce and distribute her first solo album. She launched her debut solo album "Falling in Love with a Knife" on 19 January 2014.

In 2017, she participated as a contestant in Galaxy Star, a televised singing competition and placed in the top 10. After she has competed in Galaxy Star, she engaged in shooting commercial advertisements, stage performances, and many concerts at various locations throughout Myanmar.

=== 2018–present: 2nd solo and rising popularity ===
On 27 May 2018, she released her second solo album "Pyaing Pwel" (Competition) which spawned more huge hits. Her second solo album was more successful than her first solo album – which made everyone to start recognising her as "Mee No".

She is one of the few singers in Myanmar who has sung an original English song. The name of the song is called "If you love me", which was the English lyric version of her song "Nga Ko Chit Yin" from her album, Pyaing Pwel.

== Discography ==
=== Solo albums ===
- Falling in Love with a Knife (ဓားတစ်စင်းနဲ့ချစ်မိခြင်း) (2014)
- Pyaing Pwel (Competition) (ပြိုင်ပွဲ) (2018)

=== Collaboration albums ===
- 2008 Melody World (2008)
- Eain Mat Lah Da Gal Lah (အိမ်မက်လား တကယ်လား)
- A Yin Tine Hte (အရင်တိုင်းထက်)
- A Dream From Sixteen Hundred Miles Away
