= Raymond (singer) =

Burmese musician (1988–2021)

Raymond ရေမွန်
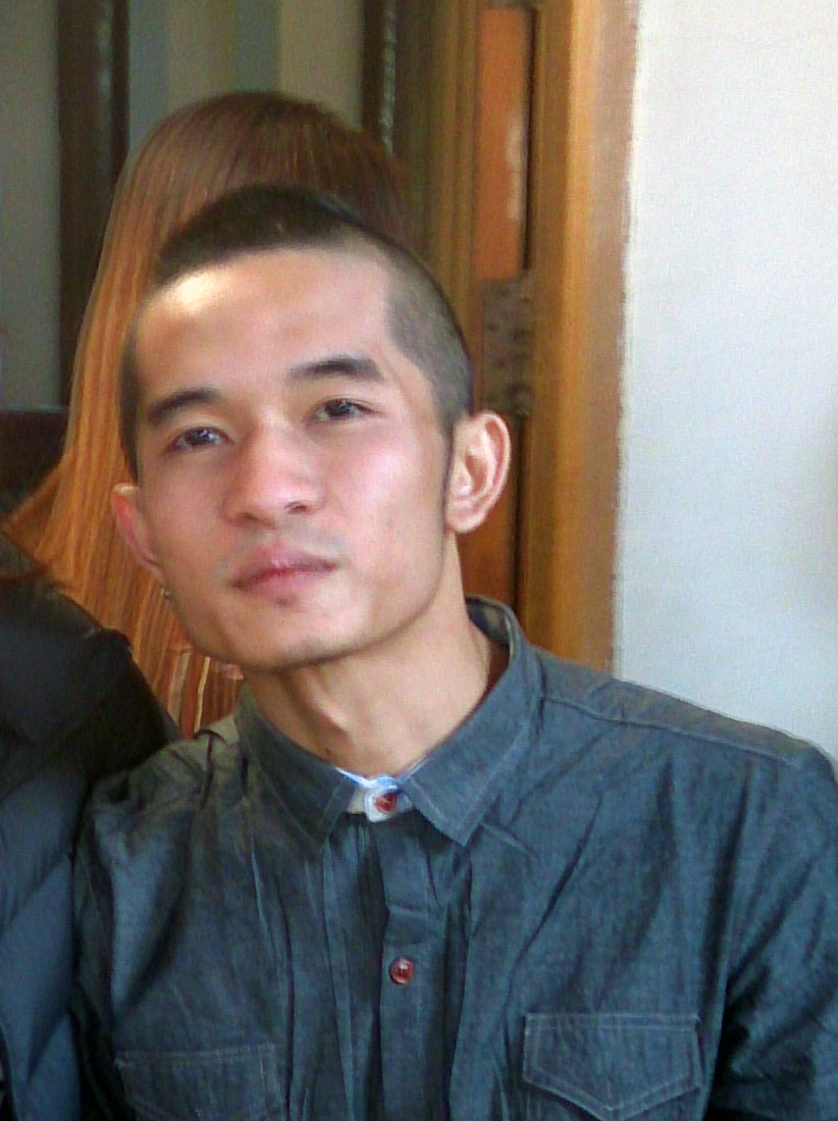
- Raymond in December 2013

Background information
- Born: Wai Mon Oo; 26 November 1988; Yangon, Myanmar
- Died: 23 June 2021 (aged 32) Karen State, Myanmar
- Genres: rock
- Occupation: Singer-songwriter
- Instruments: Guitar, vocals
- Years active: 2002–2021
- Formerly of: Idiots

Raymond (Burmese: ရေမွန်, born Wai Mon Oo (Burmese: ဝေမွန်ဦး); 26 November 1988 – 23 June 2021) was an eminent Burmese rock singer, songwriter and former lead vocalist of rock band Idiots. He was well known as a vocal critic of Myanmar's ruling military junta, and his involvement in anti-coup protests led to an arrest warrant being issued for him. He reportedly passed away from malaria.

== Early life and education ==
Born into a musical family on 26 November 1988 in Yangon, Raymond was a son of Saw Khu Hser, a songwriter, and Khin Myat Mon, a singer and vocal trainer. His parents divorced when he was one years old. His mother remarried and had a daughter named Lapyae Gabyar, who is also a singer. He went to Basic Education High School No. 1 Dagon.

== Career ==
Raymond started his music career in 2002, singing in harmony. In 2005, he co-founded Idiots, a rock band, together with Aung Ye, Phoe Lone and Kyaw Khine, and the band released several songs and mix-tapes.

Under the name of SIR Rock House, Idiots collaborated with other rock bands to release albums and performed music concerts at various locations throughout the region.

In 2011, Idiots released their first album Lu Ah Gita. It was followed by a second album Khit Thit Kyaut which was released nationwide in July 2016. The album achieved considerable success and established him as a popular singer in the Burmese music scene. The album became one of the best-selling albums in the Myanmar Music Store and listed on the top ten in the three local radio channels. It also hit second in Top Ten Best Selling Albums of all City Marts in Yangon.

On 16 December 2017, Raymond performed a major duo concert "Reason To Be Idiots," alongside Aung La from Reason band, at Hmyawzinkyun.

Featured by Kyar Pauk, Han Nay Tar and Novem Htoo, a popular song "Headshot" was his last work. The song highlights the bullies of Myanmar military and the courageous protests of the people. On 27 August 2015, he became a brand ambassador of Tuborg Myanmar.

Throughout his music career, Raymond released two albums as a collaboration with Idiots, many singles and wrote several popular songs. His popular works among Burmese youths include "Chan Khae" (ချန်ခဲ့), "Wan Nae Tat Tae Chit Thu" (ဝမ်းနည်းတတ်တဲ့ ချစ်သူ), "Su Latt" (ဆုလာဘ်), "Thay Lo Ya Tal" (သေလို့ရတယ်), and "Tway Ya Tar Wan Thar Del" (တွေ့ရတာ ဝမ်းသာတယ်). He also created the Metal Rock and Burmese musical instruments fusion cover of Clean Bandit's "Rockabye".

== Social works ==
As a member of the non-profit group Clean Yangon, he donated rice and cooking utensils to needy families during the COVID-19 pandemic in Myanmar. He was also involved in charity works with the charity organization We Love Yangon and donated food to poor families.

== Political activities ==
Following the 2021 Myanmar coup d'état, he participated in the anti-coup movement both in person at rallies and through social media. Denouncing the military coup, he took part in protests, starting in February. He joined the "We Want Justice" three-finger salute movement. The movement was launched on social media, and many celebrities have joined the movement.

In April 2021, the military junta, the State Administration Council, issued him an arrest warrant under Section 505 (a) of the Myanmar Penal Code for speaking out against the military coup. Along with several other celebrities, he was charged with calling for participation in the Civil Disobedience Movement (CDM) and damaging the state's ability to govern, with supporting the Committee Representing Pyidaungsu Hluttaw, and with generally inciting the people to disturb the peace and stability of the nation, which prompted him to flee to the jungle.

== Death ==
He died due to a peptic ulcer on 23 June 2021 at the age of 32 in an area controlled by ethnic armed forces in Karen State bordering Thailand. His funeral was held on 25 June 2021 at the KNU Brigade Area 6 in Velhikalaw Village Cemetery.

In memory of Raymond, the "Raymond Tree" campaign launched on 27 June 2021.

Prominent songwriter Sangpi wrote a tribute to Raymond's loss:

"I'm not very friendly with him. But according to the new history of Burmese music, he was a true artist who can be described as an important pillar of the musical era."
