= Graham (musician) =

Burmese singer

Graham ဂရေဟမ်
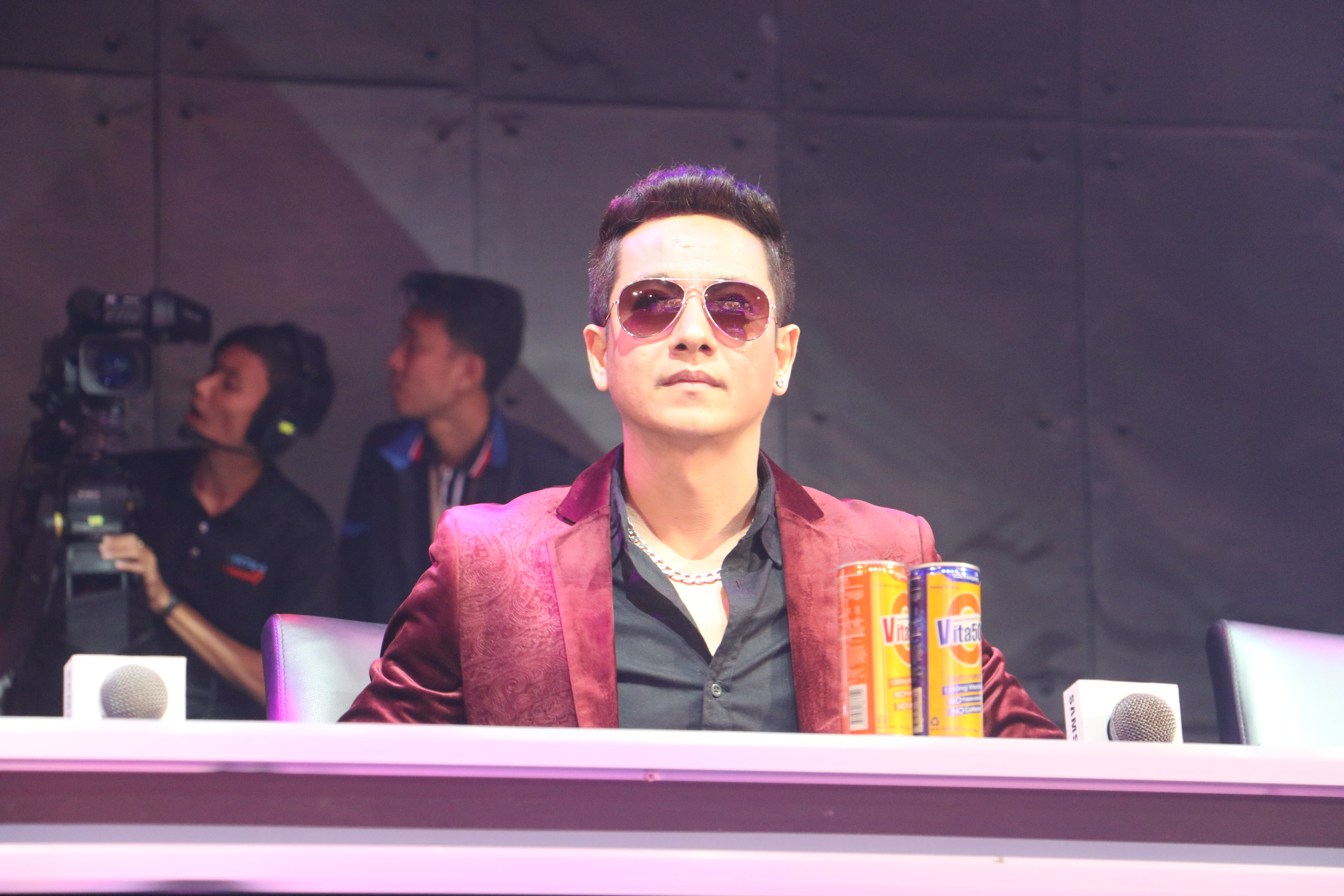
- Graham judging on Galaxy Star 2017

Background information
- Born: Taunggyi, Shan State, Myanmar
- Genres: Pop, R&B, Blues
- Occupation: Singer
- Instruments: guitars, drums, piano
- Years active: 1996 – present

Graham (Burmese: ဂရေဟမ်, Burmese pronunciation: [gəjèhàɴ]) is a Burmese singer best known for his pop songs, as well as duets with female artists, TV commercial songs and original soundtracks. He was the first male artist to have won the "Best Male Recording Artist of the Year Award" given by Yangon City FM.

== Early life ==
Graham was born to San Nyunt, a Chief Immigration Officer, and Thein Tin, a school teacher in Taunggyi, Shan State, where he lived till he graduated from his secondary college. After finishing his secondary studies, Graham came to Yangon in 1991 to attend the University of Yangon. He came to Yangon with the determination and hope of starting a professional career in music, since then capital city provided many more opportunities. He graduated with Bachelor of Law. Close friends of Graham calls him by his nickname Pu Sue (Burmese: ပူစူး).

Graham married Thinzar Oo, whom he met during his college years, in 1993. She gave birth to their first daughter Pan Yaung Chel in 1996 and their second daughter Pan Thun Chel in 2001.

== Career ==
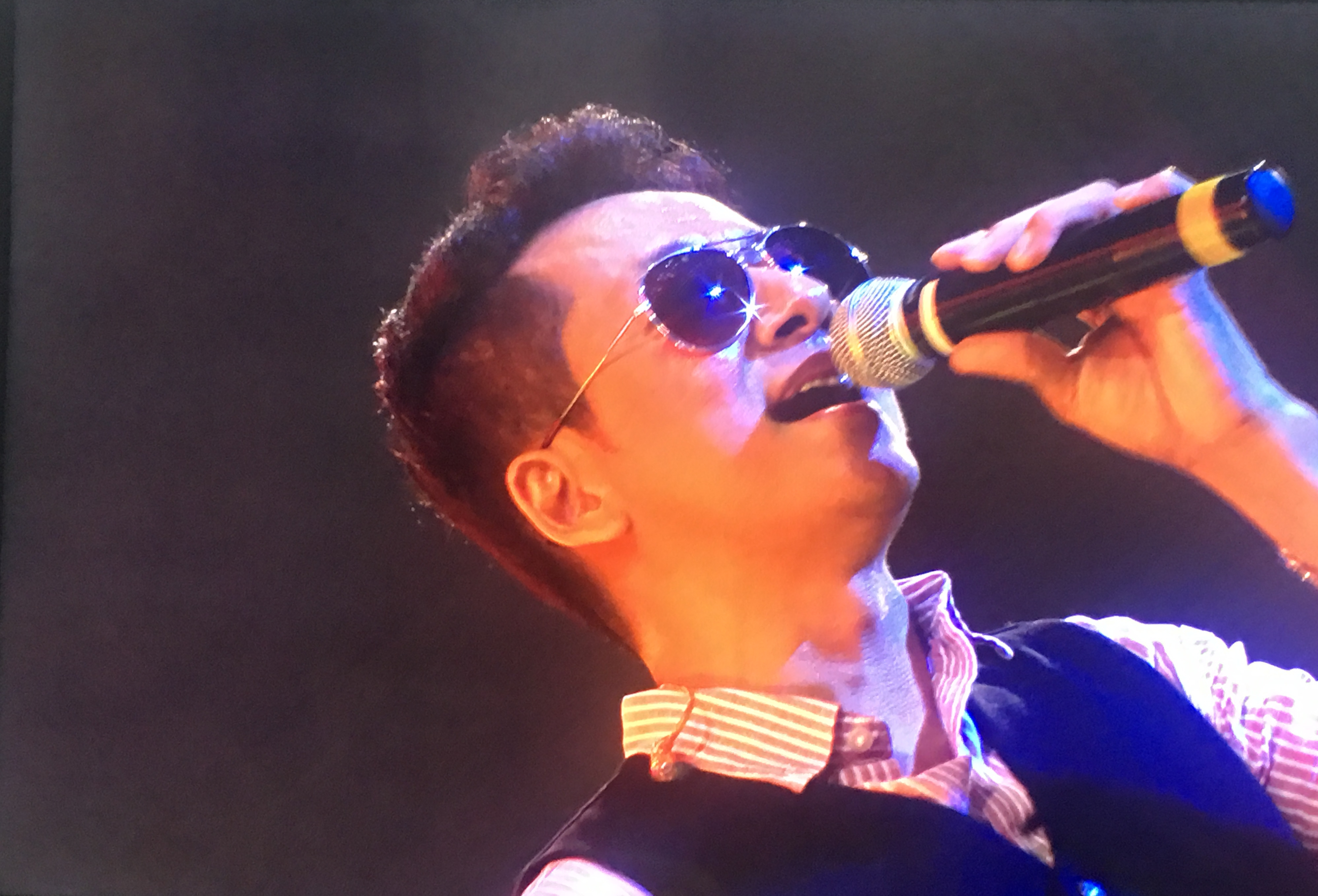
Graham performing for Peace Music Festival 2017

Graham began his career in music as a drummer in 1991, in a band called Super Star. He began playing drums at the age of 12. He debuted as a singer in 1996 with the album A Lin Daga (Door of Light). The album took a year to prepare. The band for the album consisted of his friends, as well as himself as the drummer. The song Hta-Ge (Leave Me) was the hit song of the album. After the release of his first album, he was contacted by several music producers. In 1997, he released his second album – a duet album with a female singer named Lay Lay War, on Valentine's Day, and the album was named Gandawin A-Chit Nei (Legendary Day of Love). In 1998, he released his third album Chit Thu Diary (Lover's Diary), which is still one of the top-ten most-sold-albums in the history of album sales in Myanmar. His second and third albums were more successful than his first album – which made everyone to start recognising him as "Graham". He has released 11 solo albums, more than 90 collaborative/duet albums and four special Thingyan albums – Hnit Thit Mingala 1,2,3 and 4 (New Year's Blessings 1,2,3 and 4). The Thingyan albums always rise in sales and reaches the best-selling-albums category annually during March and April when it's near the time of Myanmar New Year i.e. Thingyan.

=== Living abroad ===
Together with his wife and two daughters, Graham moved to Perth, Australia in 2008. In an interview with Myanmar People Magazine, he said that the main reason for moving to Australia was for the education of his two daughters. While in Australia, he attended Western Australian Academy of Performing Arts (WAAPA) at Edith Cowan University (ECU). Graham, with his wife and their younger daughter returned to Myanmar in 2012.

=== Return to Myanmar ===
In March 2013, Graham held his solo concert where he sang over 40 songs during the show, including several duets with his long-time musician friends. It was like his comeback concert after living abroad for several years. Not only were the seats filled but the concert was also aired live on national television for those who couldn't join in-person.

Then for two months (late July – early September) Graham went on a music tour around America. In an interview with Crown Magazine, Graham said that he was invited for a tour in America 4 or 5 times before but since he was in Australia, he couldn't go. He also added, "Since the fans got to see me for the first time in America, they were very enthusiastic". He said that his favourite weather is spring and also expressed how he would like to visit places such as England, France and Italy.

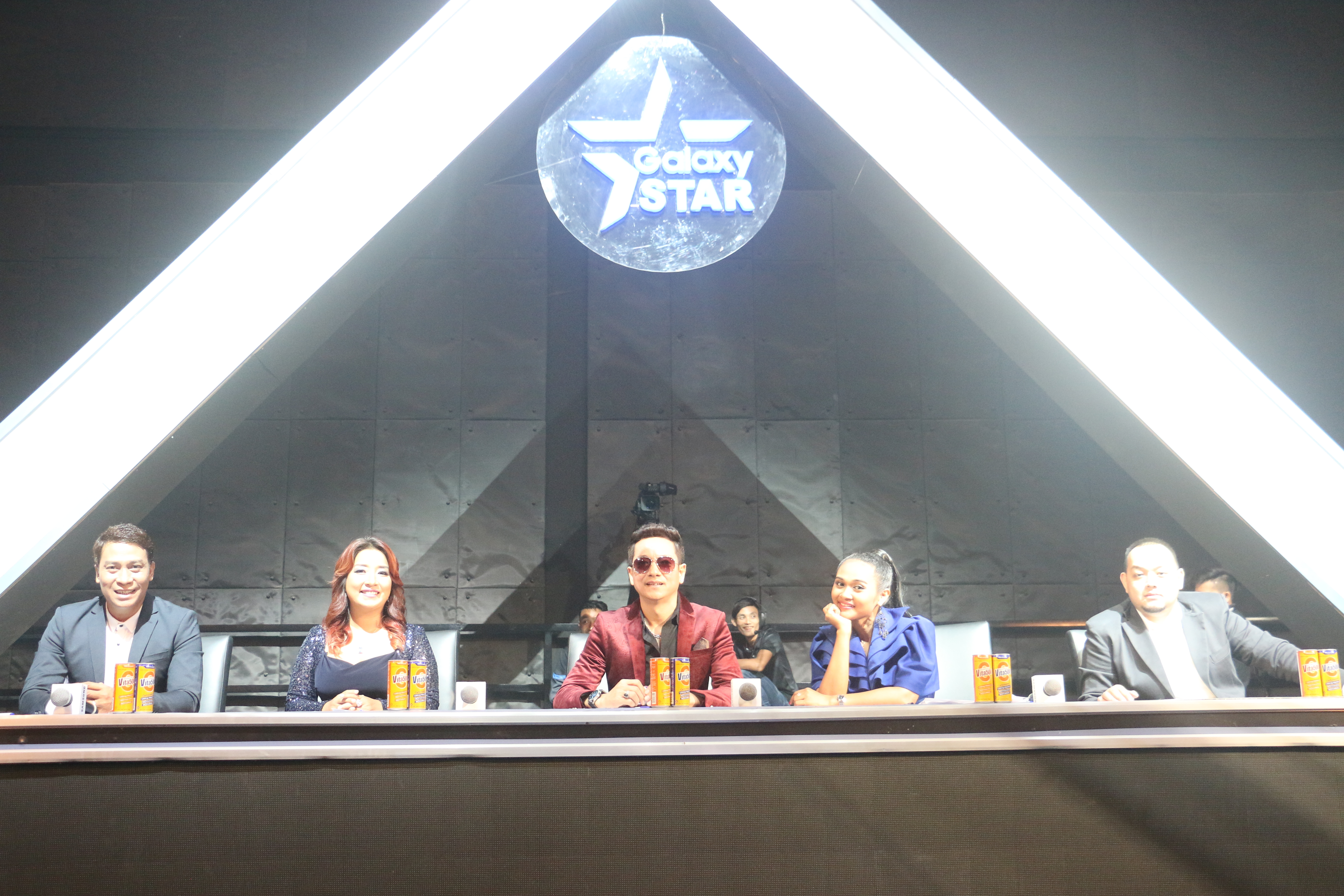
Graham with fellow Galaxy Star judges

Graham said that he was working on his new album, very likely to be released in 2014.

=== Wake Up Daddy! ===
On 9 February 2015, Graham made his comeback through his new album Wake Up Daddy!, featuring his elder daughter Pan Yaung Chel. The title song of the album was "Wake Up Daddy!", co-written by Graham, about their lifestyle in Australia.

The album consists of 14 songs – One duet, 8 songs by Graham himself and 5 songs by Pan Yaung Chel.

Since the release of the album, the song "Wake Up Daddy!" reached number one in several radios. Many fans also stated that they are looking forward to the music videos.

From the album, Ma Ywa Ne Ohn Moe (Please Don't Rain, Just Yet) seems to be the favourite of many. The song is about a man asking the woman he loves not to come into his life, just yet, for he feels he is not ready to protect her, as he lives a hard life. Here, the rain becomes a metaphor for the woman – asking for the rain to not come down just yet, in other words, asking the woman not to fall in love with him just yet.

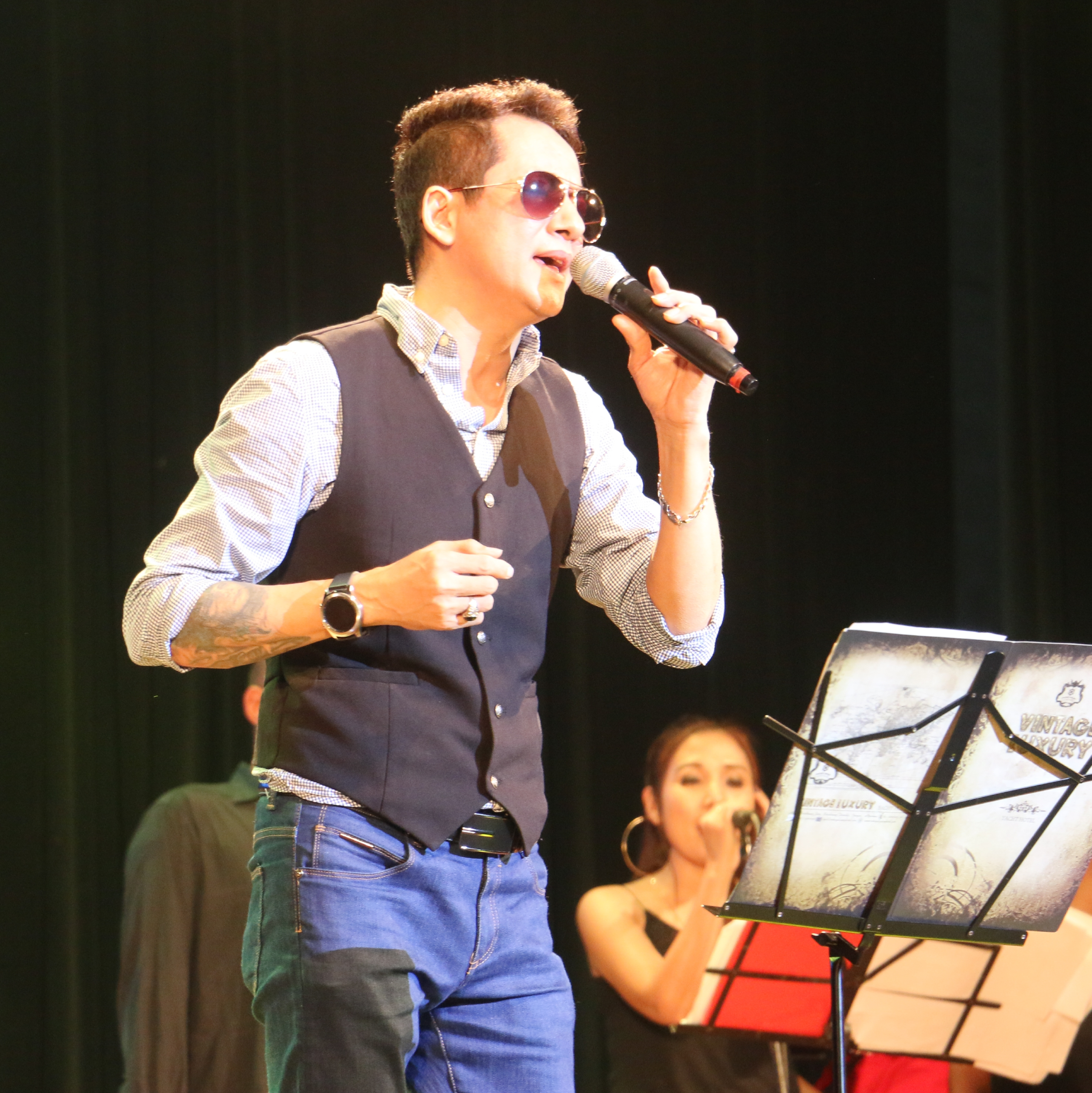
Graham at a concert in September 2017

=== Acting career ===
In 1999, he starred in his first film Manetphyan Lay Mya (Tomorrows) as the male lead actor, together with Eindra Kyaw Zin and Min Mawgun. In 2006, he starred in his first video Thissa (Loyalty) with actress Khine Thin Kyi.

=== On the judging panels ===
Graham served as a judge on the first world star searching singing competition television series in Myanmar called Galaxy Star in 2017.

In 2018, he served as one of the four judges on the third season of The X Factor Myanmar. Graham was in charge of the boys category for the season.

He will also be serving as a judge on the highly popular national singing competition Myanmar Star – Season 4 in 2027.

He also served as a judge on several other singing competitions before Galaxy Star and The X Factor Myanmar.

In 2018, he served as one of the four judges on the third season of The X Factor Myanmar. Graham was in charge of the boys category for the season.

He also served as a judge on several other singing competitions before Galaxy Star and The X Factor Myanmar.

=== Brand Ambassadorships ===
Graham and his family began working as Mitsubishi Motors's first ever Brand Ambassadors in Myanmar from the September of 2019. Graham and his family also starred in television commercials and photo ads together for several other brands.

== Discography ==
=== Solo albums ===
- A-Lin Daga (Door of Light) (1996)
- Gandawin A-Chit Nei (Legendary Day of Love) (1997)
- Yet Myat Mingala (Blessed Day) (1998)
- Chit Thu Diary (Lover's Diary) (1998)
- A-Phaw (Partner) (1999)
- Ya-Nei Mha Sa Nhit Ta-Ya Daing (From Today, Till Hundreds of Years) (2000)
- Winyin Ta Khu Ye Hsanda (A Soul's Wish) (2001)
- A-Chit Lo-In (The Wish of a Love) (2002)
- Hsan-Pya De A-Chit (Splendid Love) (2003)
- Let Hsaung (Gift) (2003)
- Graham Live (2005)
- Wake Up Daddy! (2015)
