= Kim Hyung-suk =

South Korean philosopher (born 1920)

- 김형석
- Born: April 23, 1920 (age 106); Unsan, Heianhoku-dō, Korea, Empire of Japan
- Education: Sophia University
- Occupations: Professor in philosophy, writer

Kim Hyung-suk or Kim Hyung-seok (Korean: 김형석; Hanja: 金亨錫; born April 23, 1920) is a North Korean-born South Korean writer, philosopher, & professor emeritus of Yonsei University. He taught as a professor at the Department of Philosophy of Yonsei University from 1954 to 1985. He became professor emeritus of the same school after his retirement in 1985. He was a visiting professor at the University of Chicago and Harvard University. He is the author of a few best-selling books which include Solitude (고독이라는 병) (1960) and The Discourse between Eternity and Love (영원과 사랑의 대화) (1961). He turned 100 in Korean age in 2019.

== Life ==
Kim was born in 1920 in Unsan, Heianhoku-dō, Korea, Empire of Japan. He spent his childhood at Taedong, South Pyongan. He grew up in the same region as Kim Il-Sung and became acquainted with him in his youth. He went to Soongsil Middle School where he became acquainted with the poet Yun Dong-ju. He studied philosophy at Sophia University. In 1947, he moved from North Korea to the South where he taught at Joongang Middle and High School in Seoul for 7 years. He became a professor of philosophy at Yonsei University in 1954 until his retirement in 1985. In 1985, he became professor emeritus of Yonsei University.

== Published works ==
- Solitude (고독이라는 병, 1960)
- A Conversation Between Eternity and Love (영원과 사랑의 대화, 1961)
- Will You Spend the Day in Vain (그대여 이날을 헛되이 보내려나, 1985)
- To Find the Meaning of Life (인생의 의미를 찾기 위하여, 1988)
- A Story I Wish to Share with You (그대와 나누고 싶은 이야기가 있다, 1990)
- Hometown with Life and Pine Forest (인생, 소나무 숲이 있는 고향, 1991)
- I Love, Therefore I Am (나는 사랑한다. 그러므로 나는 있다, 1991)
- Doing Philosophy with a Hammer (망치들고 철학하는 사람들, 1995)
- Every Child Has a Dream (모든 자녀들에게 꿈이 있다, 1998)
- The World of Philosophy (철학의 세계, 2002)
- My Life, My Faith (나의 인생 나의 신앙, 2012)
- What Makes Us Happy? (우리는 무엇으로 행복해지나, 2016)
- How to Believe (어떻게 믿을 것인가, 2016)
- Upon Living 100 Years (백년을 살아보니, 2016)
- A Theory of Happiness (2026)
