= Sone Thin Par =

Sung tin Par ဆုန်သင်းပါရ်
- Born: December 3, 1981 (age 44); Rangoon, Burma
- Origin: Chin State, Burma
- Genres: Pop, Rock
- Occupation: Singer
- Years active: 1998-2006; 2012–present

Sone Thin Par (Burmese: ဆုန်သင်းပါရ်; also spelt Sung Tin Par, Sung Thin Par, Sung Tin Par) is a prominent Burmese rock singer-musician of ethnic Chin descent. She rose to fame in 1998, and ended a 7-year hiatus from the music industry in December 2012, with the release of her fourth solo album, Thit (သစ်). She was selected to sing the 2013 Southeast Asian Games' official song, "Colorful Garden" (ရောင်စုံဥယျာဉ်) in December 2013.

Sung Tin Par was born in Rangoon, Burma, to Pu Sang Nawn, a police officer, and Pi Nawn Tang. She was named by her grandmother; her name means "treasured flower" in the Chin language. A devout Christian, Sung married Sang Za Lian, also known as Htin Aung, on 5 May 2010.

== Discography ==
- Ko A-kyaung Nae Ko (ကိုယ့်အကြာင်းနဲ့ကိုယ်) (2000)
- Set Yan (စက်ရန်) (2002)
- Min Ko (မင်းကို) (2004)
- Aa Thit (အသစ်) (2012)
- Lo Yar Su (လိုရာဆု) (2017)

== See also ==
- Music of Myanmar
