= Project K (band) =

Burmese boy band

- Origin: Myanmar
- Genres: Burmese pop
- Years active: 2016–present
- Members: Bhone Nay Lin Kai(Micky); Bhone Nay Min Khant(Morris); Chan Myae Oo(Htet Phone Naing); Hein Yar; Min Khant Hein; William Tun; Ye Yint Thaw(Yo Yo)
- Website: Project K on Facebook

Project K is a seven-member boy band in Myanmar that formed in 2016. The septet — composed of Bhone Nay Lin Kai(Micky), Bhone Nay Min Khant (Morris), Chan Myae Oo (Htet Phone Naing), Hein Yar, Min Khant Hein, William Tun, and Ye Yint Thaw — is known for their dancing and singing abilities, and fashion. Until the debut of ALFA in 2019, Project K was Myanmar's only K-pop style boy band. The K in "Project K" stands for "king," "Korea," and "K-pop." The majority of them have Northern Chinese ancestry, which contributed to their Korean-passing appearance—a key reason they were handpicked. The group is known for incorporating traditional Burmese dance styles to their dance performances, and has amassed as significant social media following as a result.

== Career ==
Three dance crews — Triplet (comprising William Tun, Bhone Nay Min Khant-Morris and Bhone Nay Lin Kai-Micky), Jade Dragon (comprising Htet Phone Naing (Chan Myae Oo), Min Khant Hein, and Hein Yar), and a solo dancer (Ye Yint Thaw) — joined forces in August 2016 to form Project K, in the lead-up to the 2016 K-pop Cover Dance Festival. Project K first gained traction after winning 2nd place at said competition in Seoul, South Korea on 8 October 2016. In April 2017, the group's members all ordained as Buddhist monks, to mark Thingyan, the Burmese New Year.

Project K garnered praise from Myanmar's State Counsellor Aung San Suu Kyi, who considered herself a fan of the group. She noted the group's ability to blend traditional Burmese dance styles into contemporary dance routines during her remarks at the 2018 Myanmar Entrepreneurship Summit, held in December 2018. During the 2019 ASEAN-Korea Summit, she asked Moon Jae-in to allow Project K to train in South Korea. In December 2019, filming commenced for a television series, Before and After (ပြောင်းလဲခြင်းနောက်ကွယ်), starring Project K, Thinzar Wint Kyaw, and Wa Shwe Nwe Thway Win.

In February 2020, Project K covered Hlwan Moe's classic Burmese language song, "That Yangon Lad is Me" (ရန်ကုန်သားလေးကျွန်တော်), at Yangon City FM's 18th Annual Music Awards. In August 2020, the group performed in a traditional Burmese monsoon season theatrical show (မိုးရာသီသဘင်ပွဲ), headlined by traditional actors Han Za Moe Win and Tin Maung San Min Win. In September 2020, in the lead-up to the 2020 Myanmar general election, Project K released an election song, dubbed "Choose With Your Own Hands" (ကိုယ့်လက်နှင့်ရွေးချယ်), in support of the National League for Democracy's electoral campaign. The song's music video was directed by Kyi Phyu Shin.

In September 2020, the band traveled to South Korea to train for a month in the lead-up to performing at the Asia Song Festival, held in October 2020 in Gyeongju. Their performance at the 2020 Asia Song Festival was marred with some controversy, with Burmese netizens and religious hardliners criticizing the band for dancing on CGI images of Shwedagon Pagoda. Upon their return to Myanmar, the group was met with protestors at the Yangon International Airport. Project K issued a swift apology on Facebook, reiterating that all the members were Buddhist, and that the group members had not known they would perform atop images of the sacred pagoda during rehearsals.

In December 2020, South Korea's Ministry of Culture, Sports and Tourism requested 1.5 billion won in funding to support the K-pop training of Asian artists, citing Project K. The National Assembly ultimately approved 400 million won to fund the program.

== Members ==
- Bhone Nay Lin Kai-Micky(ဘုန်းနေလင်းခိုင်)
- Bhone Nay Min Khant-Morris(ဘုန်းနေမင်းခန့်)
- Chan Myae Oo (ချမ်းမြေ့ဦး)
- Hein Yar (ဟိဏ်းရာ)
- Min Khant Hein (မင်းခန့်ဟိန်း)
- William Tun (ဝီလျှံထွန်း)
- Ye Yint Thaw (ရဲရင့်သော်)

== Discography ==
=== Albums ===
- The Beginning (2017)

=== Singles ===
- "Storyteller" (2018)
- "Worry About You" (2018)
- "Conversation" (2018)
- "Never Fall Down" (2018)
- "Wrong Wish" (ဆုတောင်းမှား) (2019)
- "That Yangon Lad is Me" (ရန်ကုန်သားလေးကျွန်တော်) (2020)
- "Choose With Your Own Hands" (ကိုယ့်လက်နှင့်ရွေးချယ်) (2020)
- "Stay Strong" (2020)

== See also ==
- Music of Burma
- K-pop
