= Phoe Kar =

Phoe Kar ဖိုးကာ
- Born: Burma
- Genres: pop, rock
- Occupations: Singer-songwriter
- Years active: 1997–present

Phoe Kar (Burmese: ဖိုးကာ; also spelt Phoe Ka and Pho Kar) is a prominent Burmese singer, known for his hit songs, "Lan khwe" (လမ်းခွဲ) and "Ta sein sein kyi" (တစိမ့်စိမ့်ကြည့်). He entered the music industry in 1997 with the album Hman ta chat ye eit-met (မှန်တစ်ချပ်ရဲ့ အိပ် မက်). His daughter, Phu Phu Thit (ဖူးဖူးသစ်), is also a singer.

== Discography ==
=== Solo albums ===
- Hman ta chat ye eit-met မှန်တစ်ချပ်ရဲ့ အိပ်မက် (1997)
- Hmyaw lin thaw lan မျှော်လင့်သောလမ်း (2002)
- Ta Saint Saint Kyi တစိမ့်စိမ့်ကြည့် (2007)
- To to lay pyaw ba တိုးတိုးလေးပြောပါ (2008)
- Eit-met အိပ်မက် (2013)
- Phyan khin ဖြန့်ခင်း (2016)

== See also ==
- Music of Myanmar
