= Military ranks of Myanmar =

The Military ranks of Myanmar are the military insignia used by the Myanmar Defence Services, its auxiliary services, some government departments and some civilian organizations.

All the government employees are called "civil service personnel" (Burmese: နိုင်ငံ့ဝန်ထမ်း, romanized: nuiṅʻ ṅaing nangʻwimn thamʻʺ, lit. 'State's employee'). Their ranks and appointments are grouped into two categories:

1. Officer or gazetted officer , whose promotion and posting are recorded in the Gazette of Myanmar.
2. Staff or Other Ranks ranks below the gazetted officers.

Personnel of the Defence Services and the Myanmar Police Force are included in the civil service personnel but the rules of civil service personnel are not applied to them because of the special nature of their duties.

The rank insignia of Myanmar Defence Services is the basic form for all other rank insignia in Myanmar.

- Some departments/organizations use the same insignia as that of the Defence Services but with different colour, (example: rank insignia of Myanmar Police Force use silver stars instead of golden ones).
- Some use the same style as that of the Defence Services but with organization's symbol in place of military stars (example: rank insignia of Myanmar Red Cross Society use red crosses in place of rank stars).
- Those departments that don't use the military-like uniform system, use the pin badges with rank insignia (example: rank insignia of General Administration Department).

== Myanmar Defence Services ==
All three branches of Myanmar Defence Services use the same rank system and insignia. While the titles are the same across all branches in Burmese, English translations are different depending on the branch.

cap badges

Commissioned officers

Other ranks

=== Officers ===
In Myanmar Defence Services, the officer cadets who have graduated from Defense Services Academies (DSA, DSMA, DSTA, etc.) and Officer Training Schools (OTS) are directly commissioned as gazetted officers with the rank of Second Lieutenant or Sub-lieutenant. Builʻ (Burmese: ဗိုလ်, lit. 'commander') serves as the root word for each officer rank.

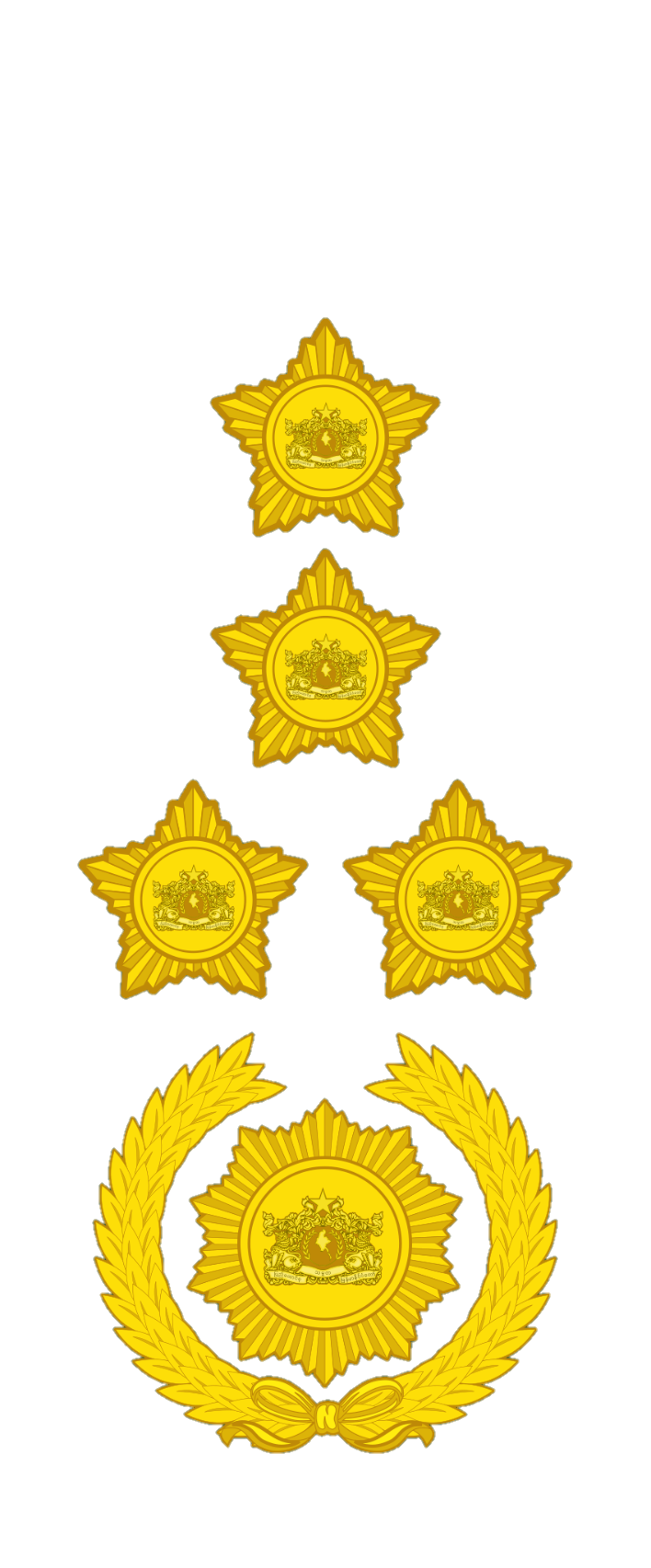
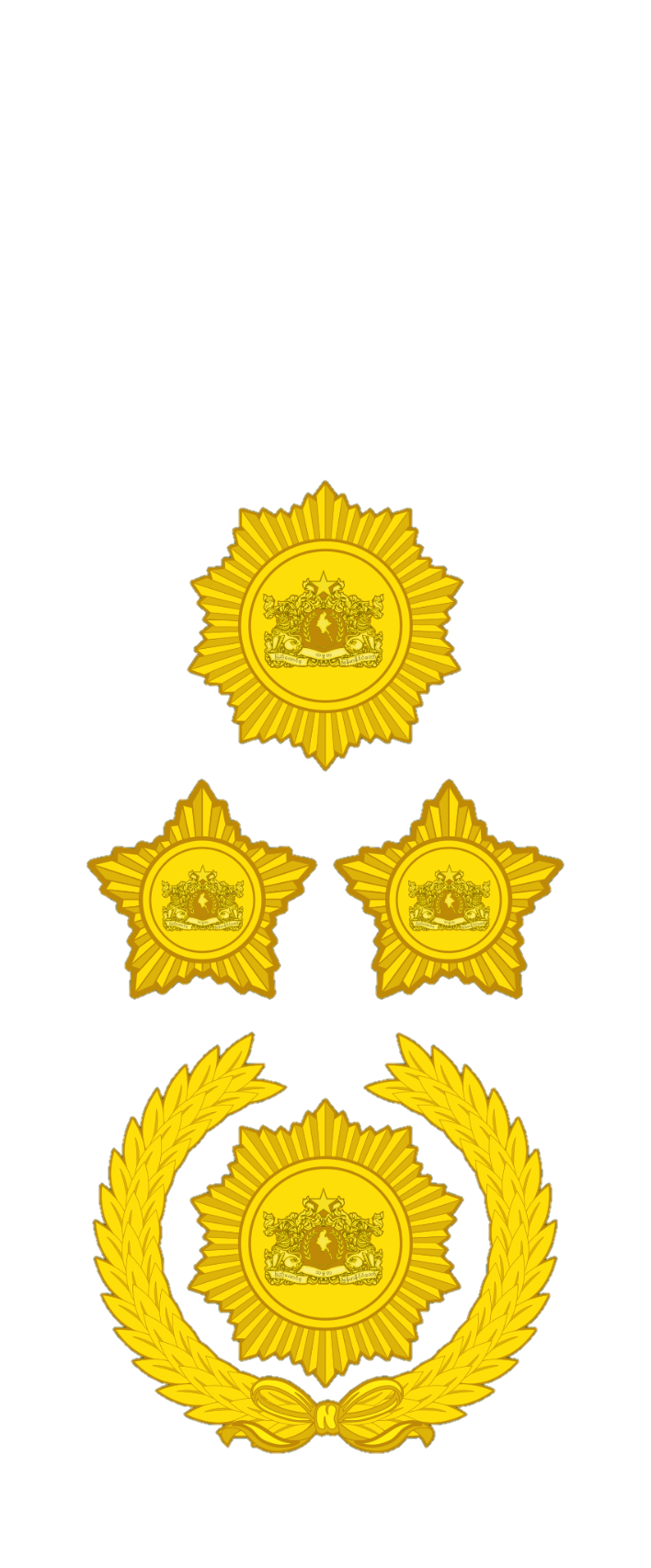
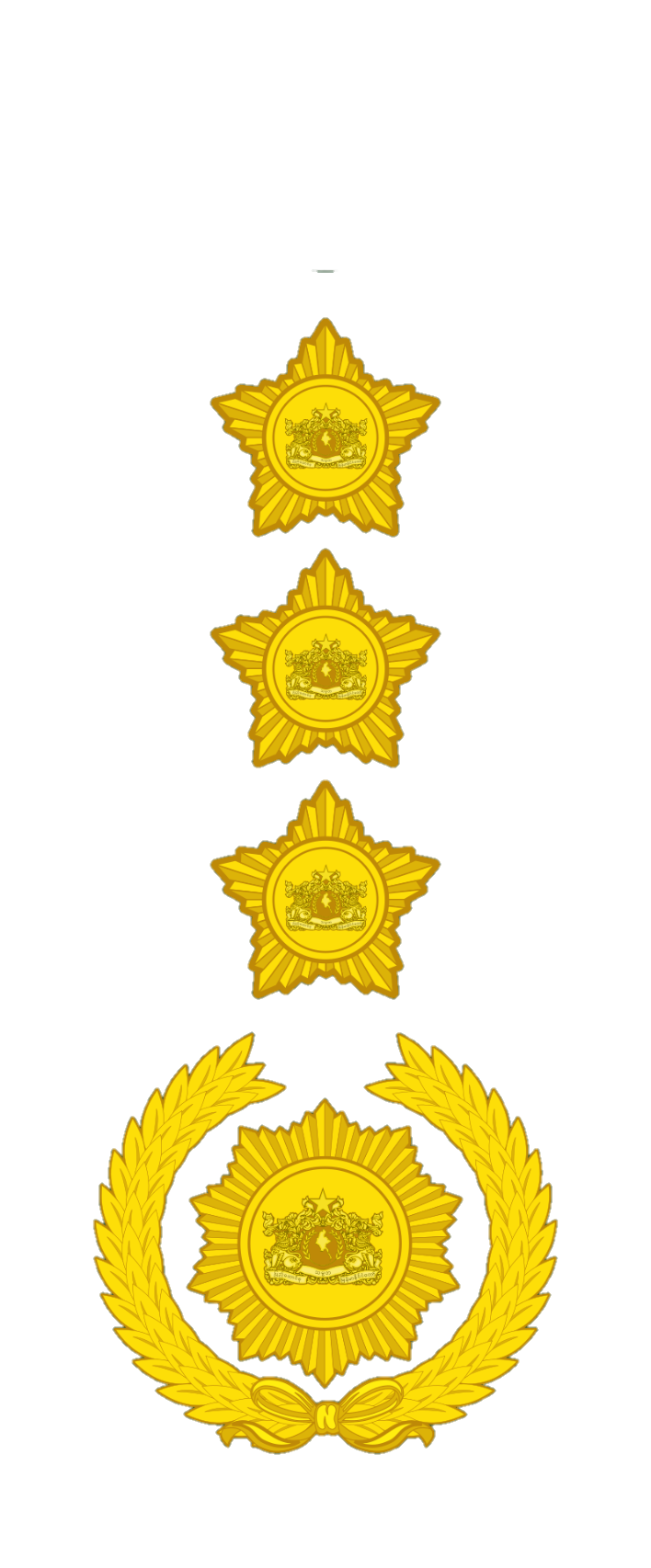
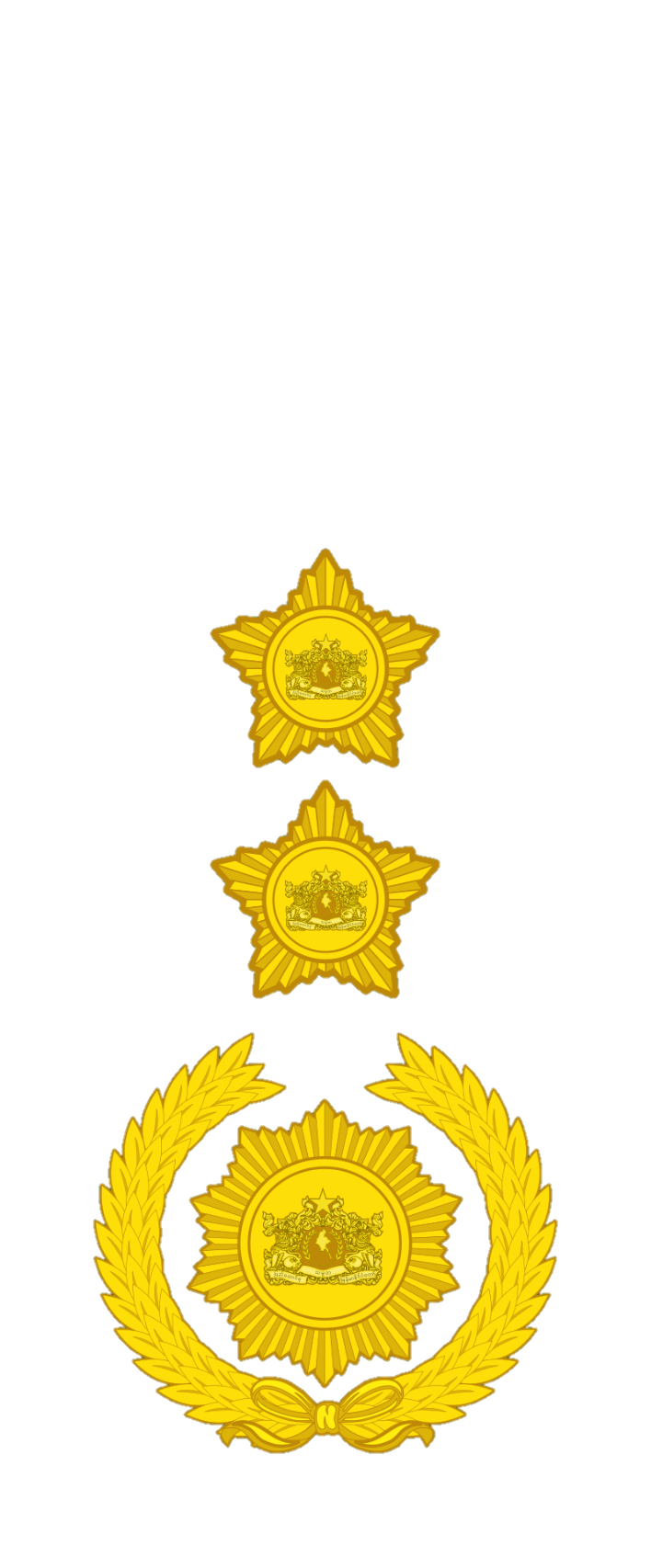
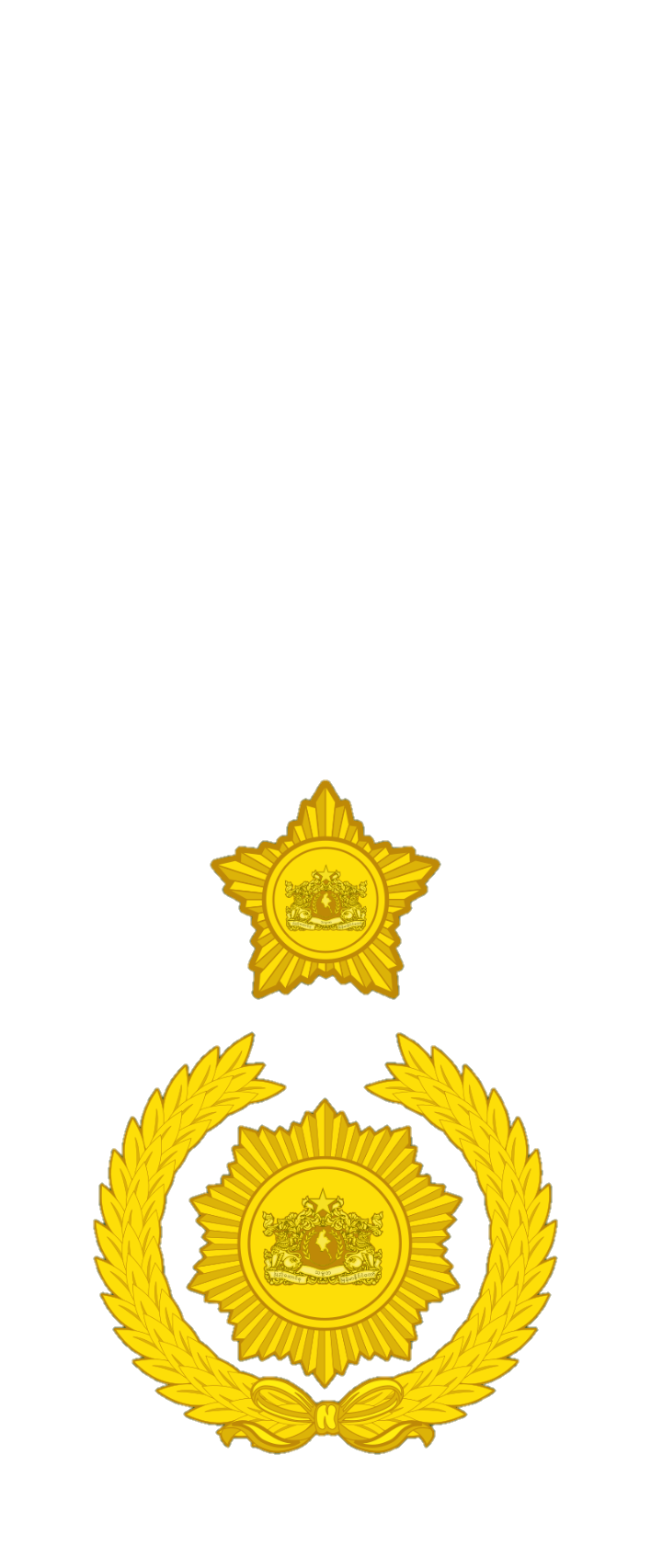
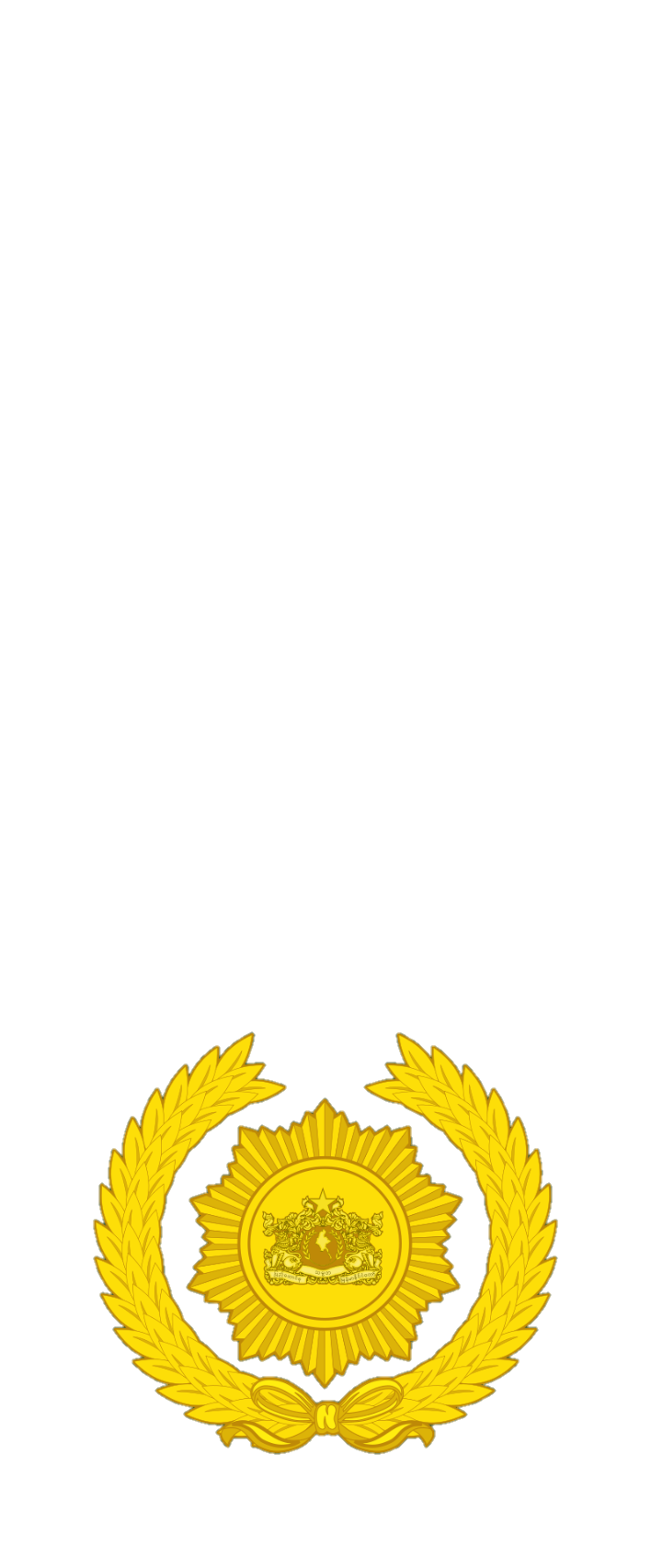
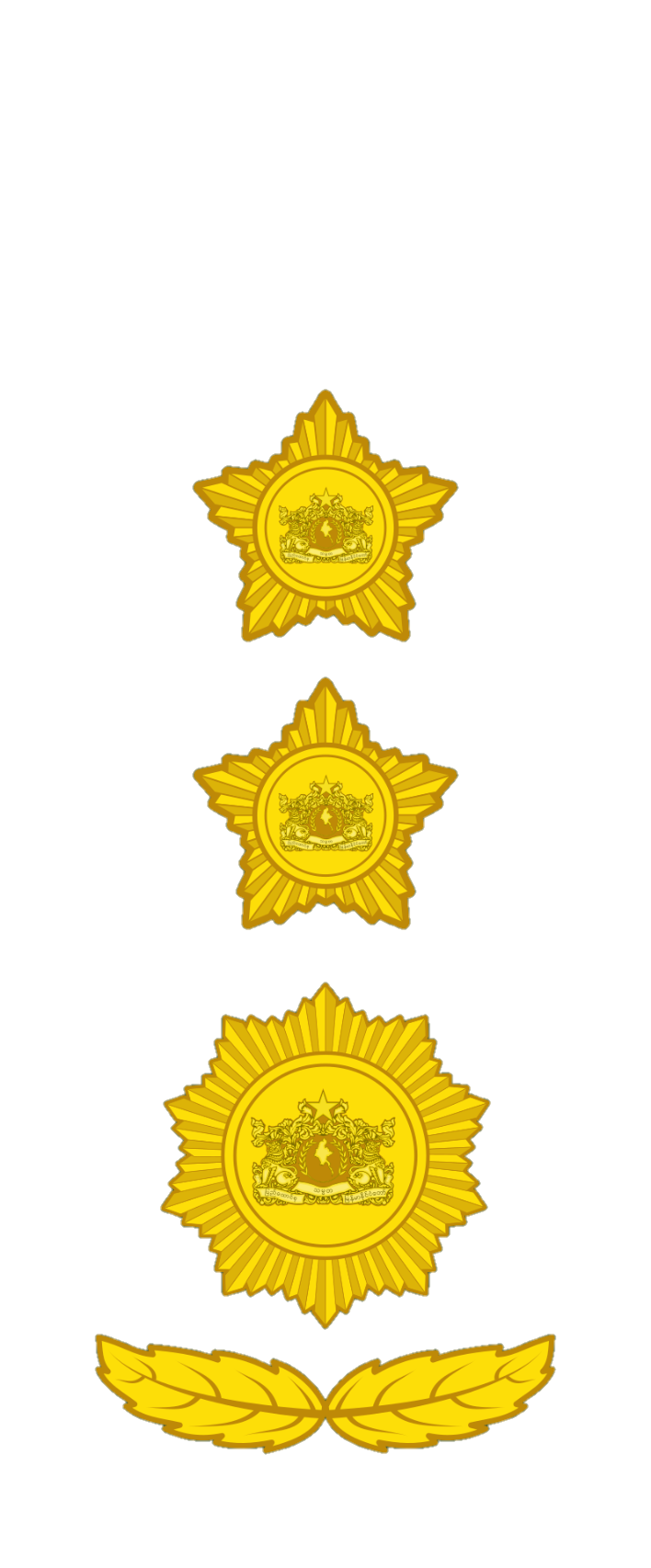
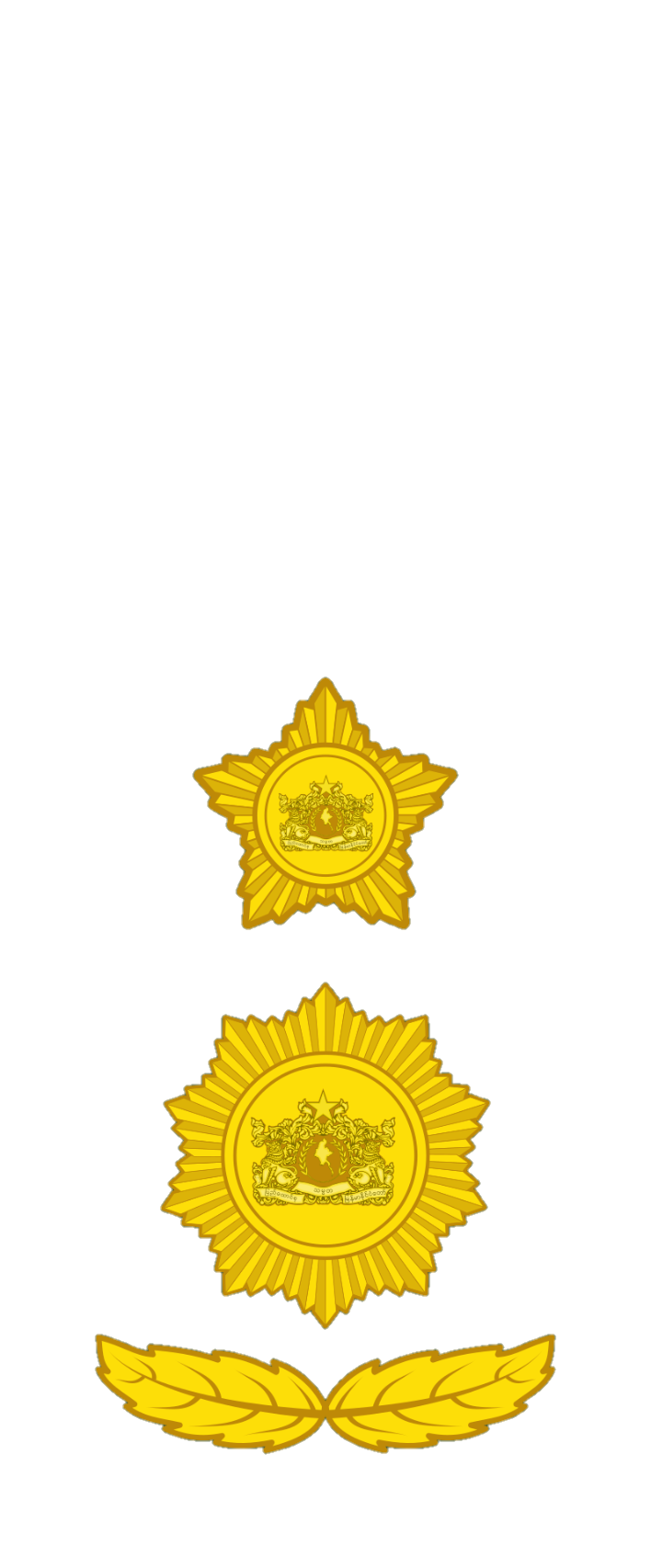
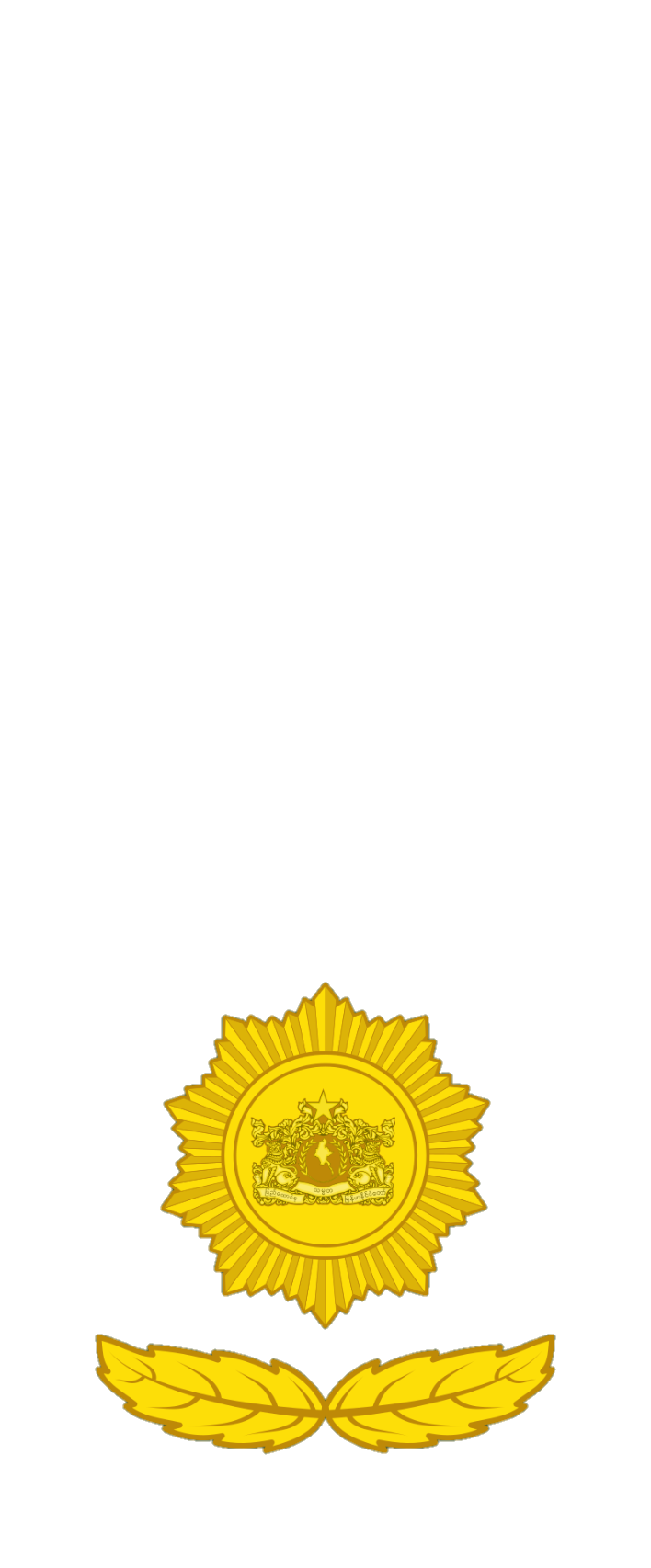
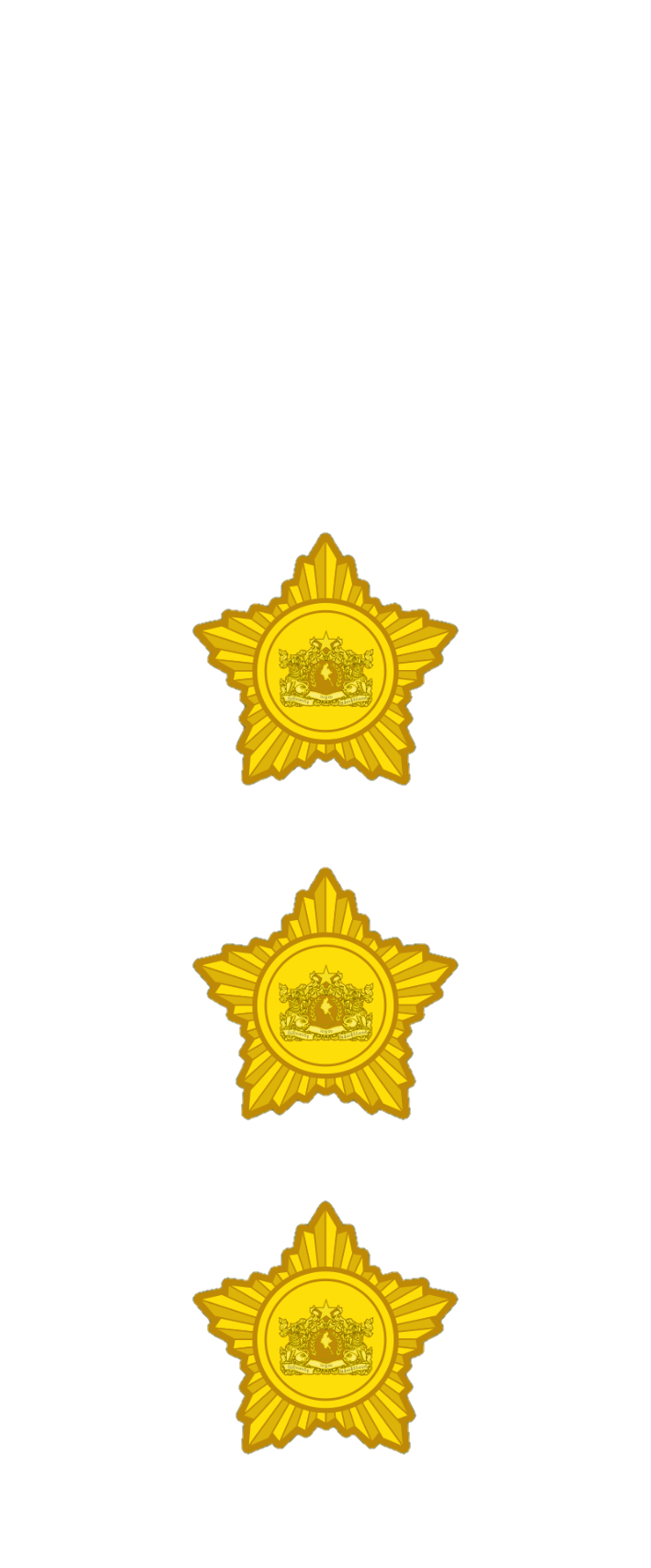
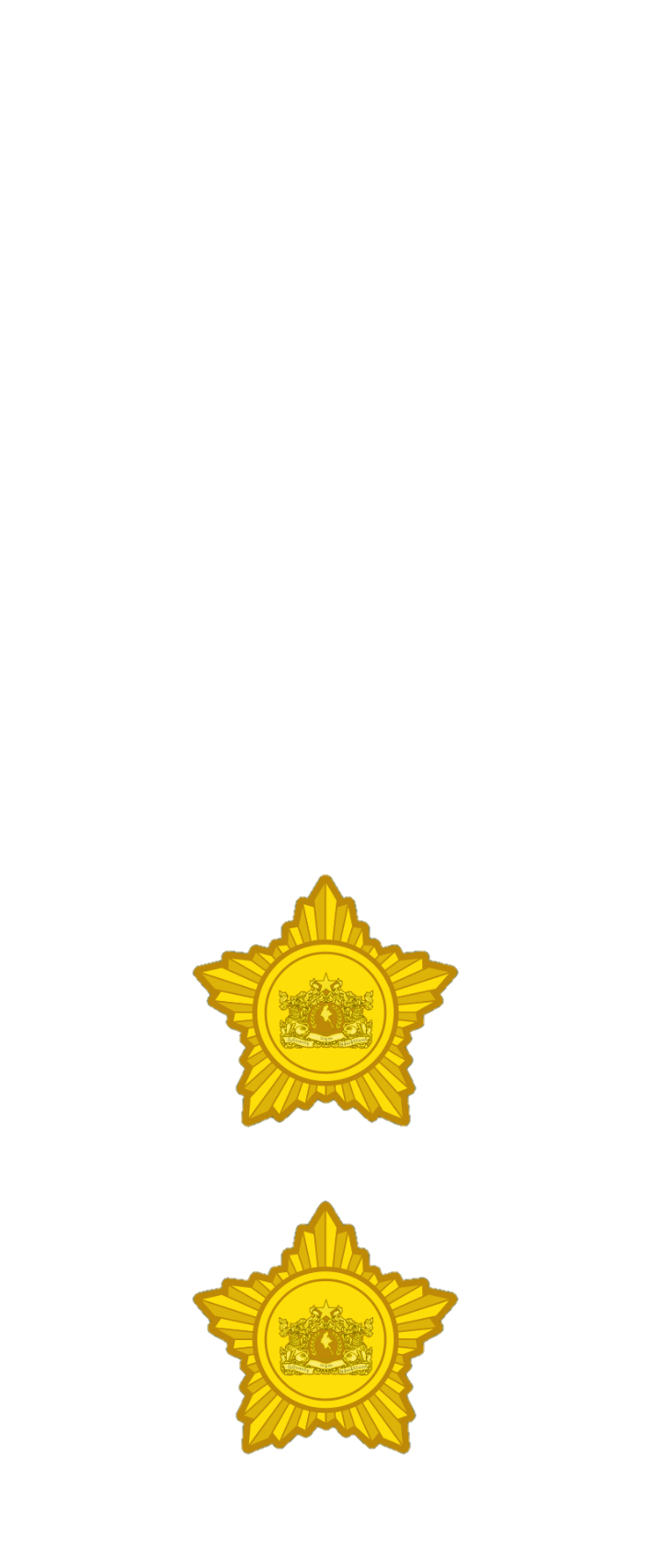
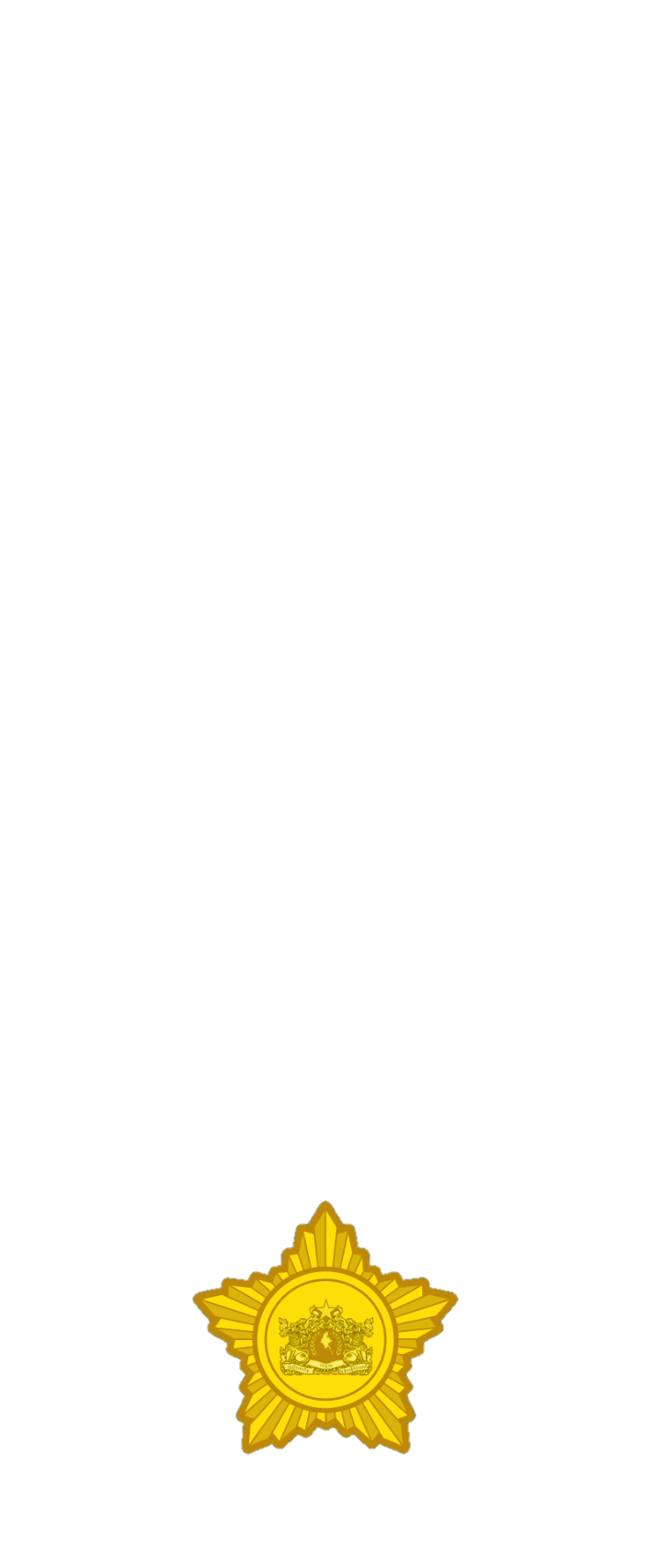
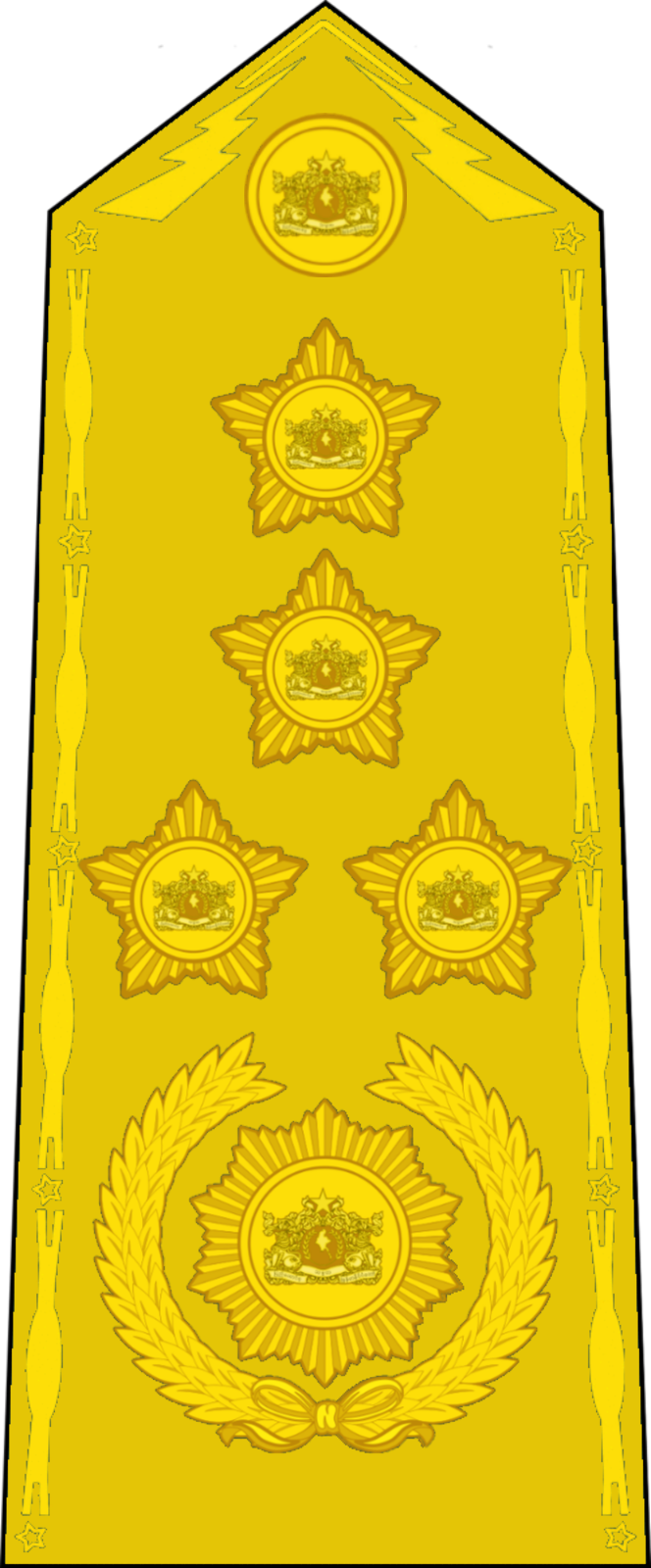
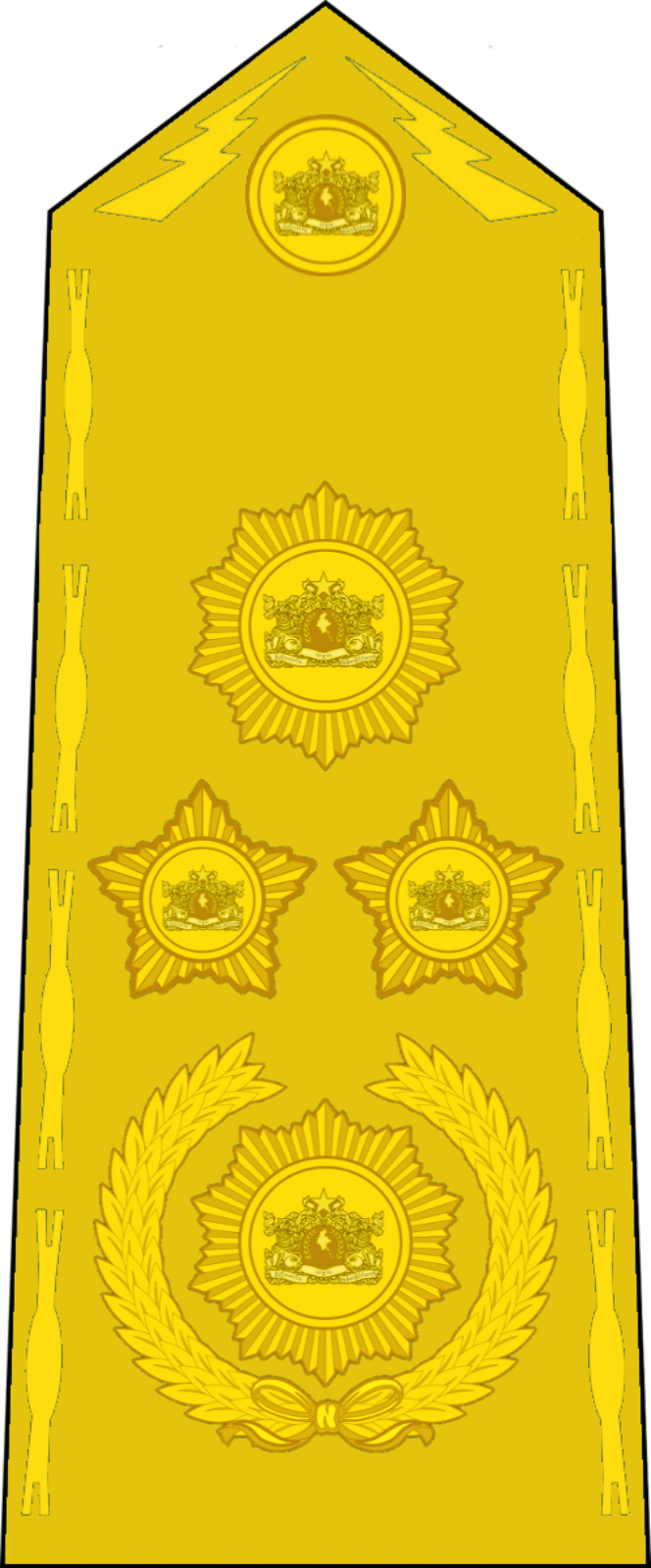
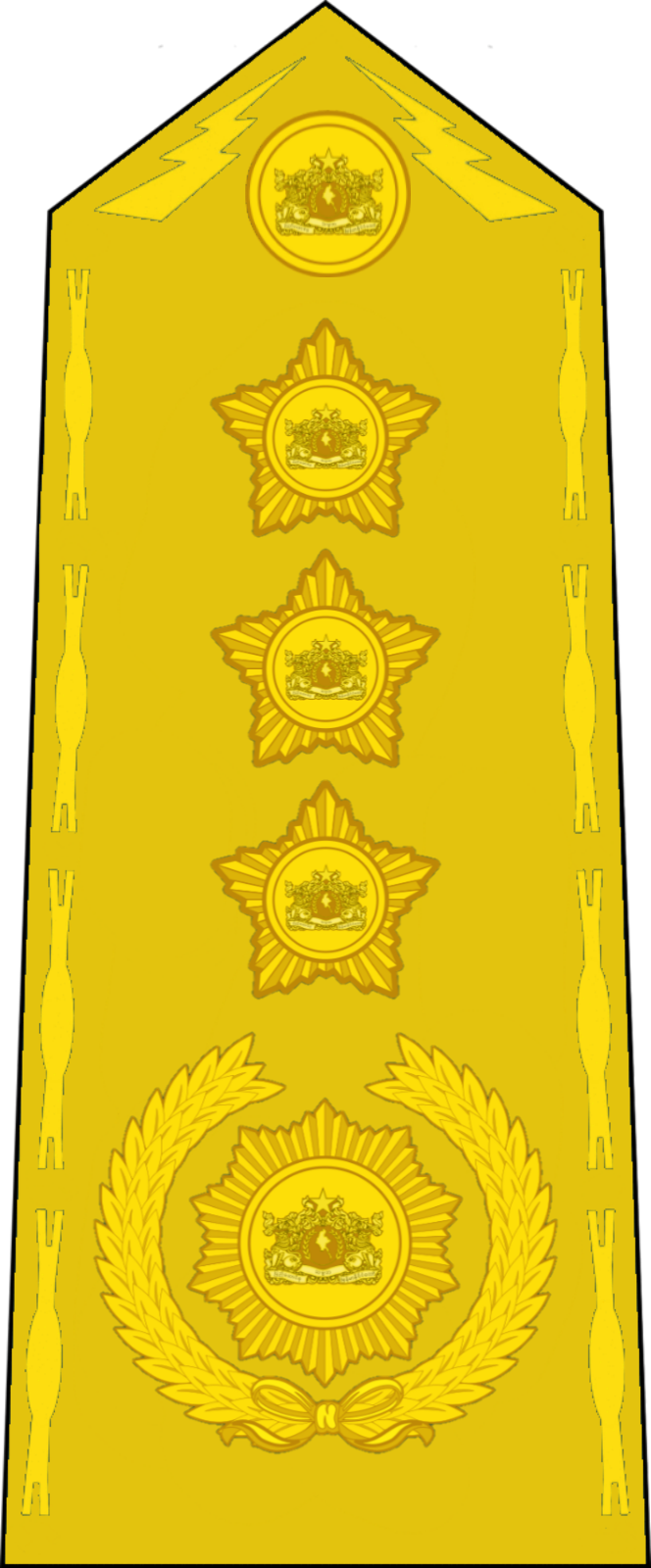
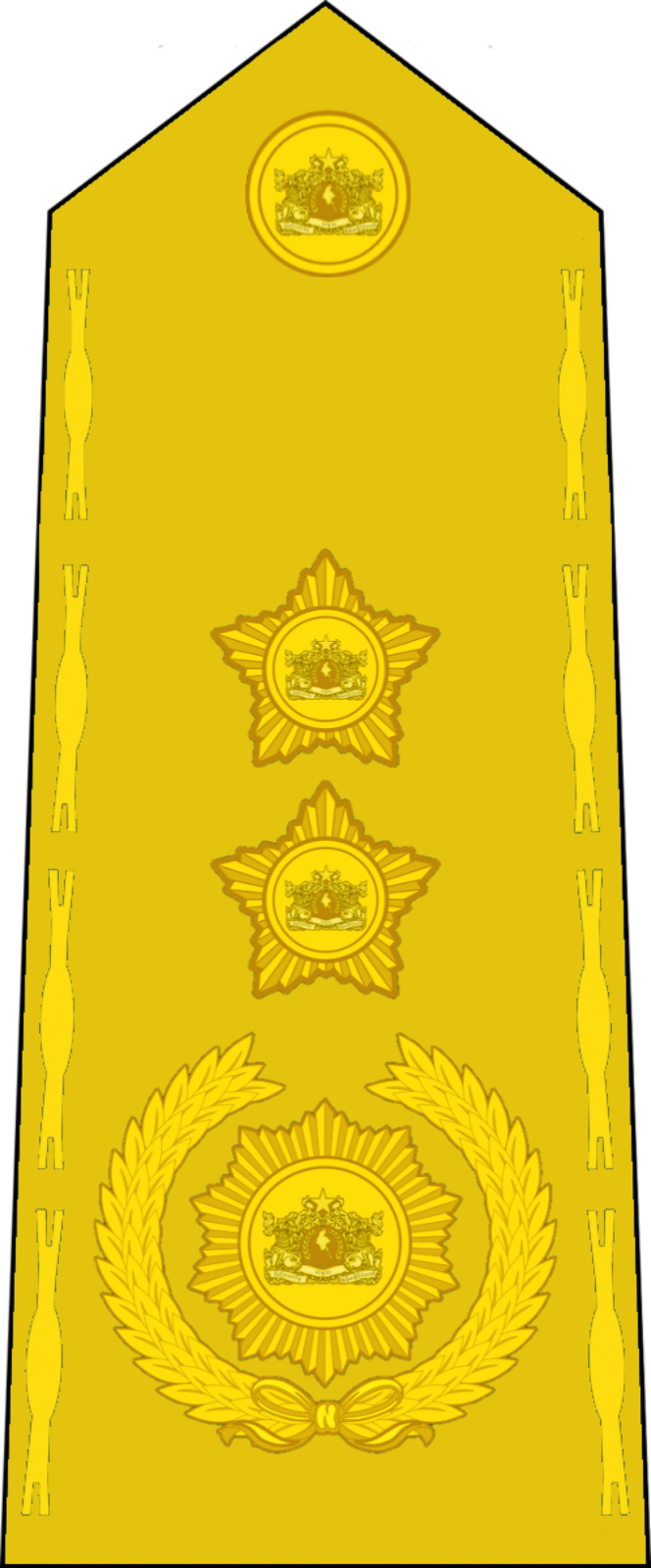
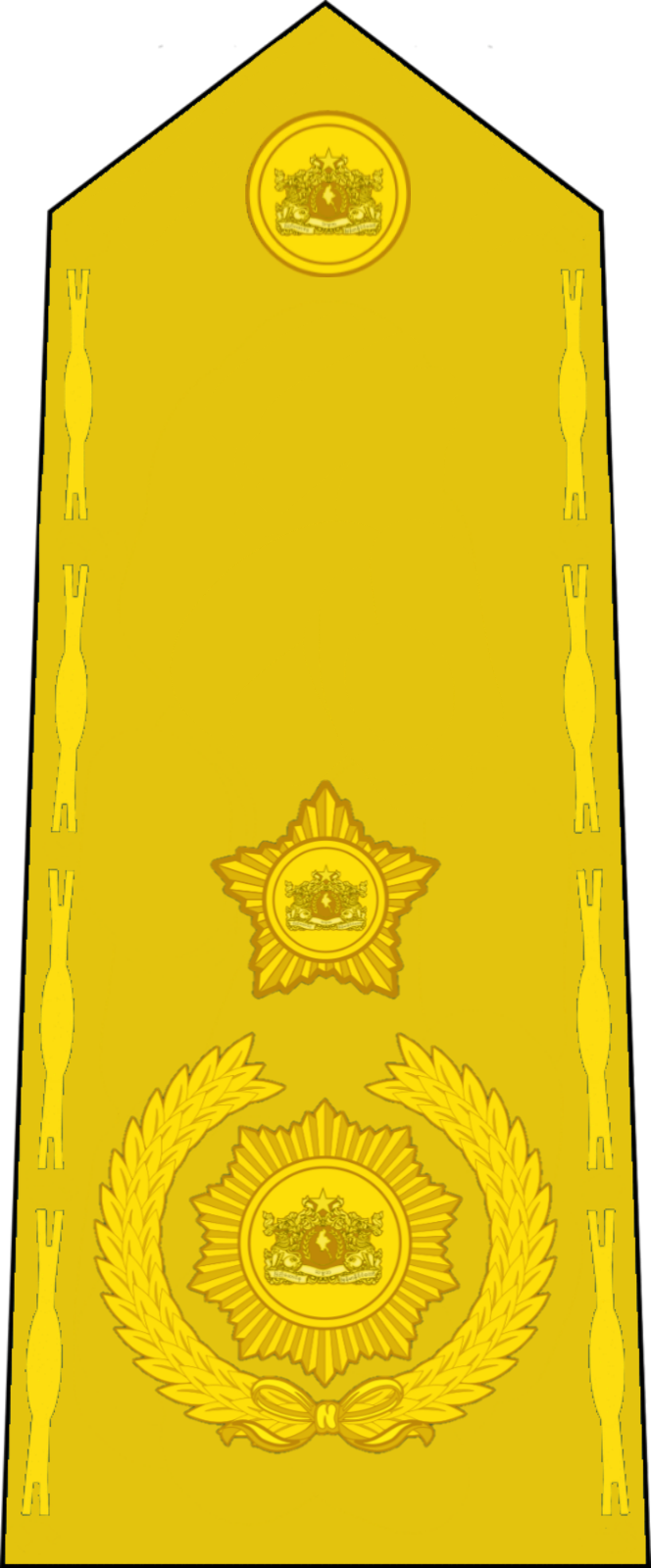
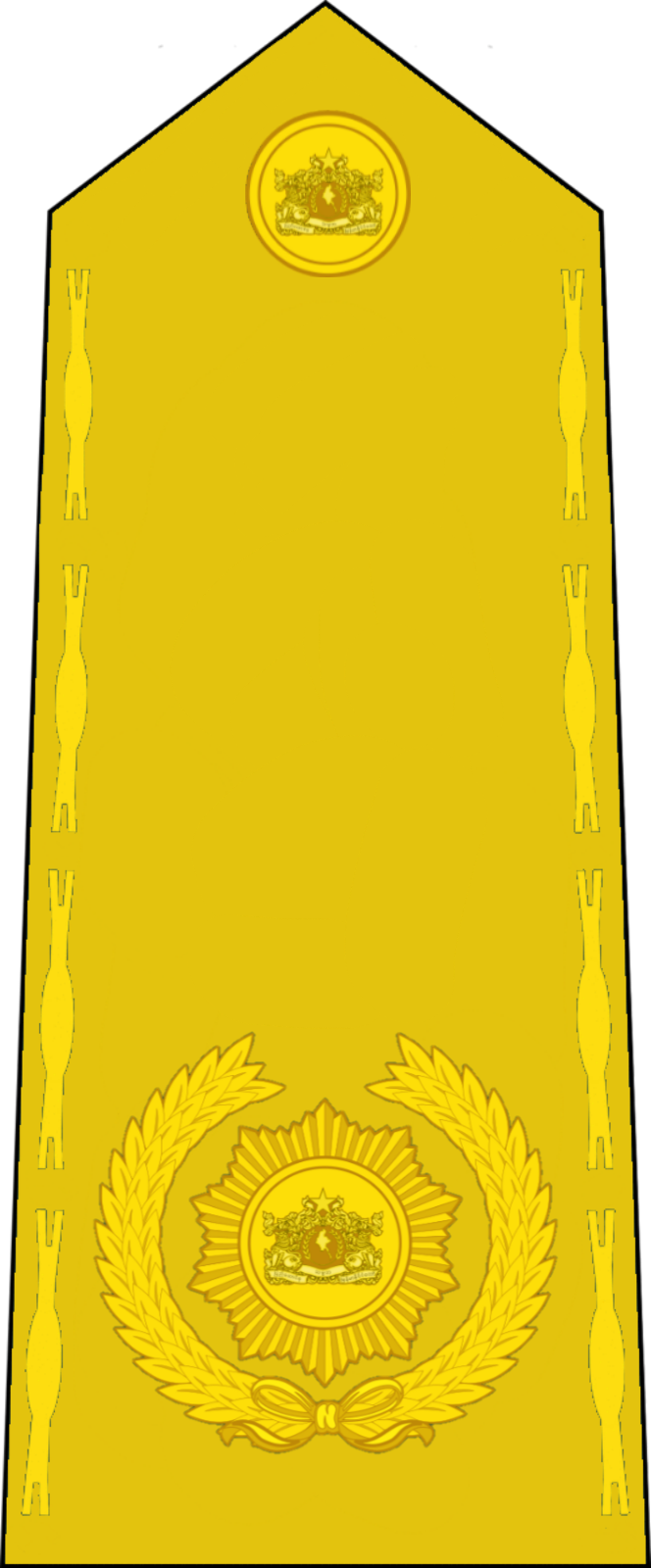
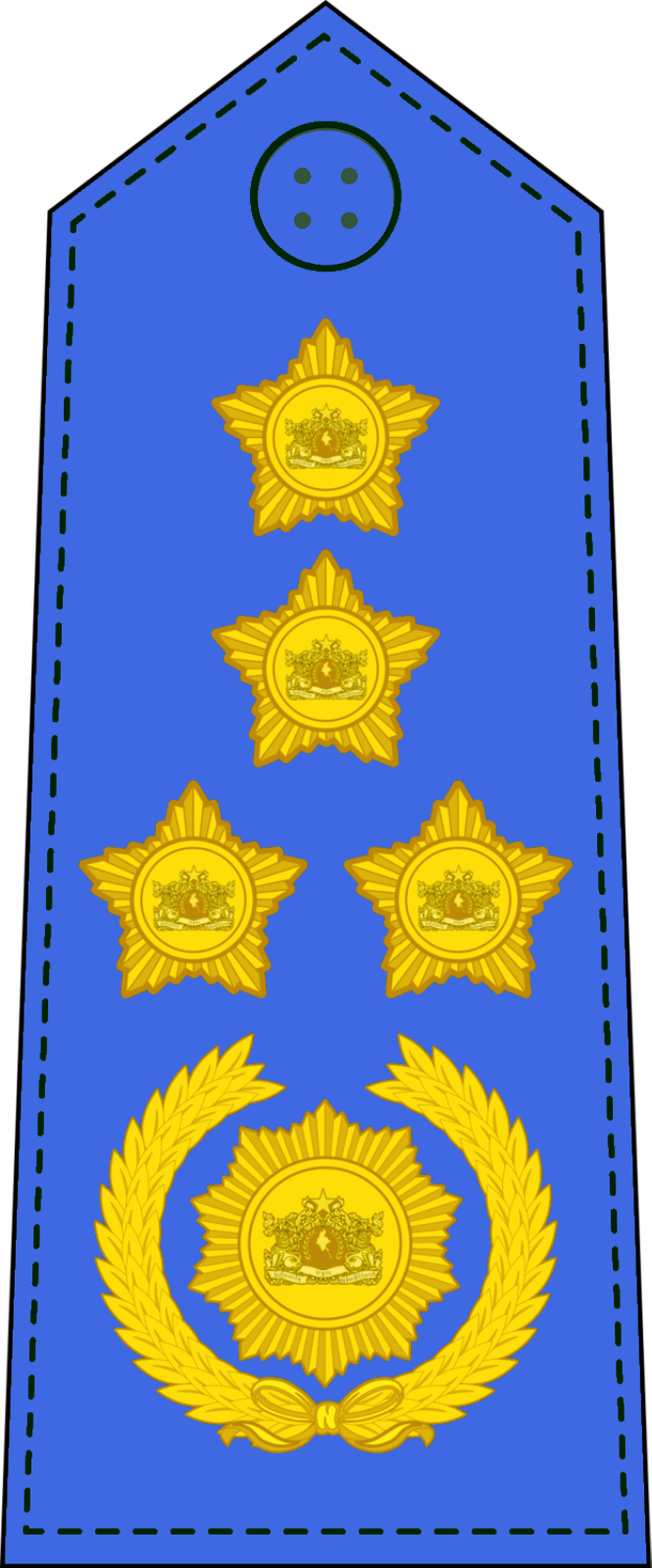
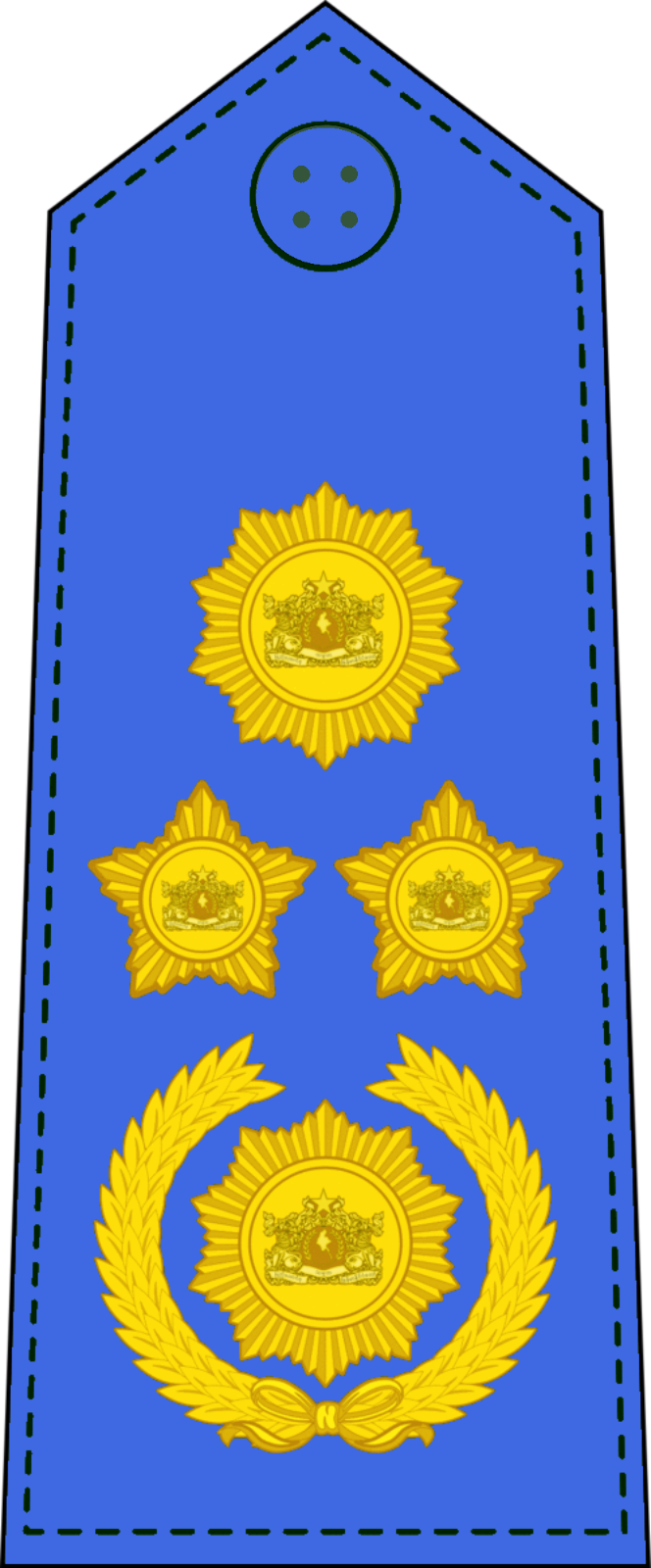
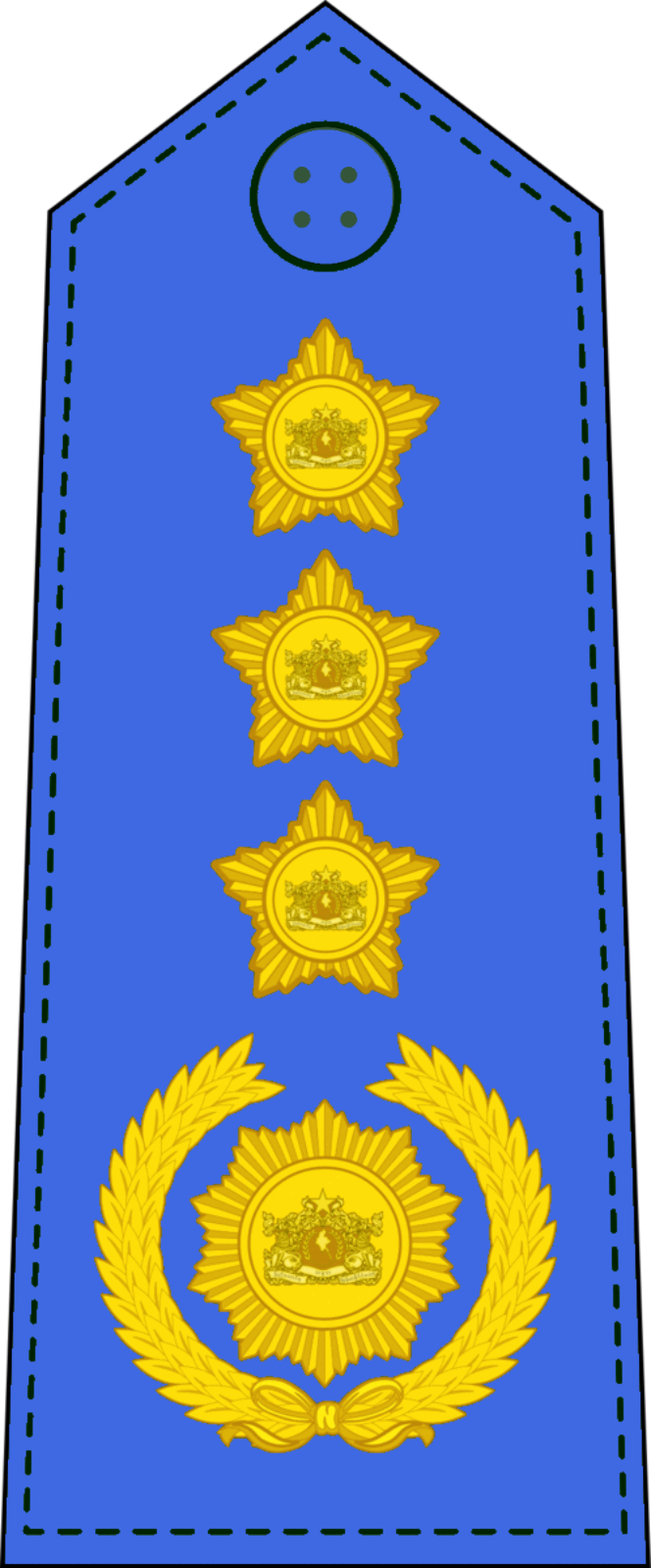
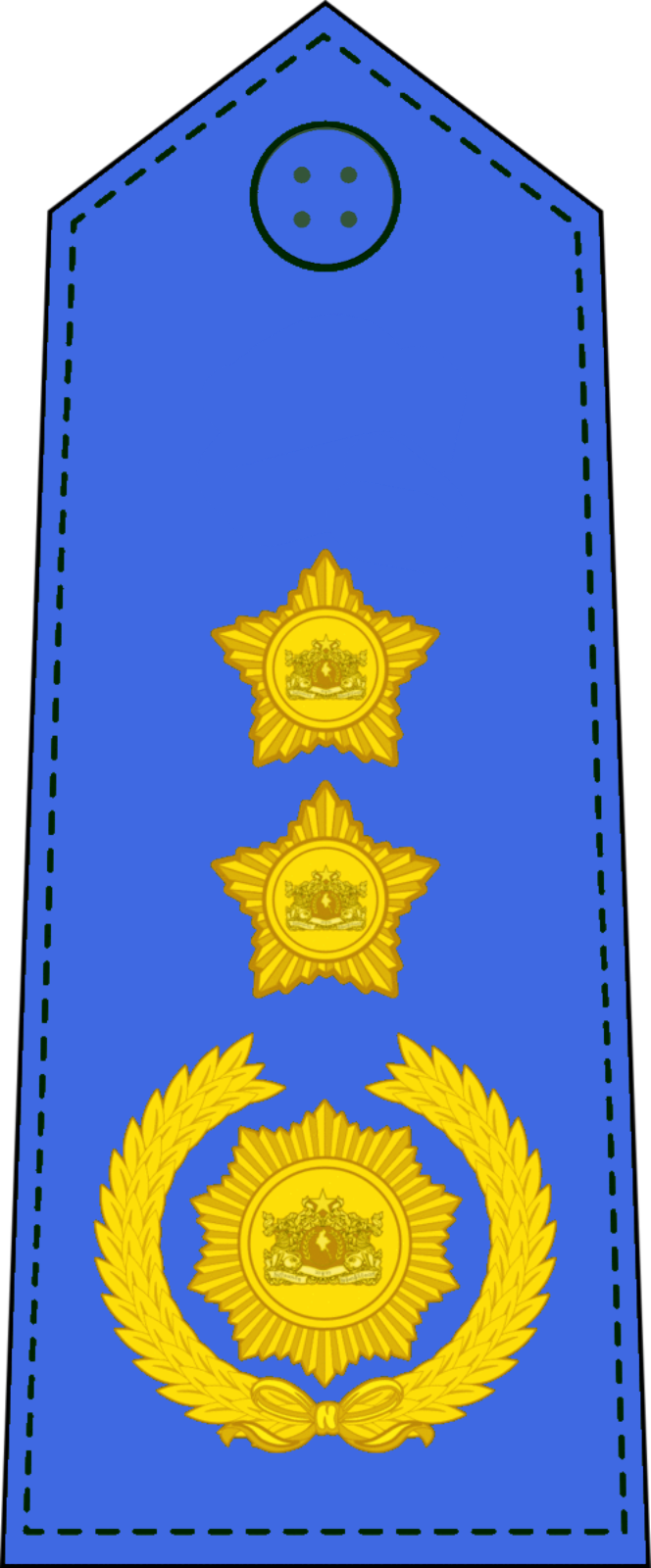
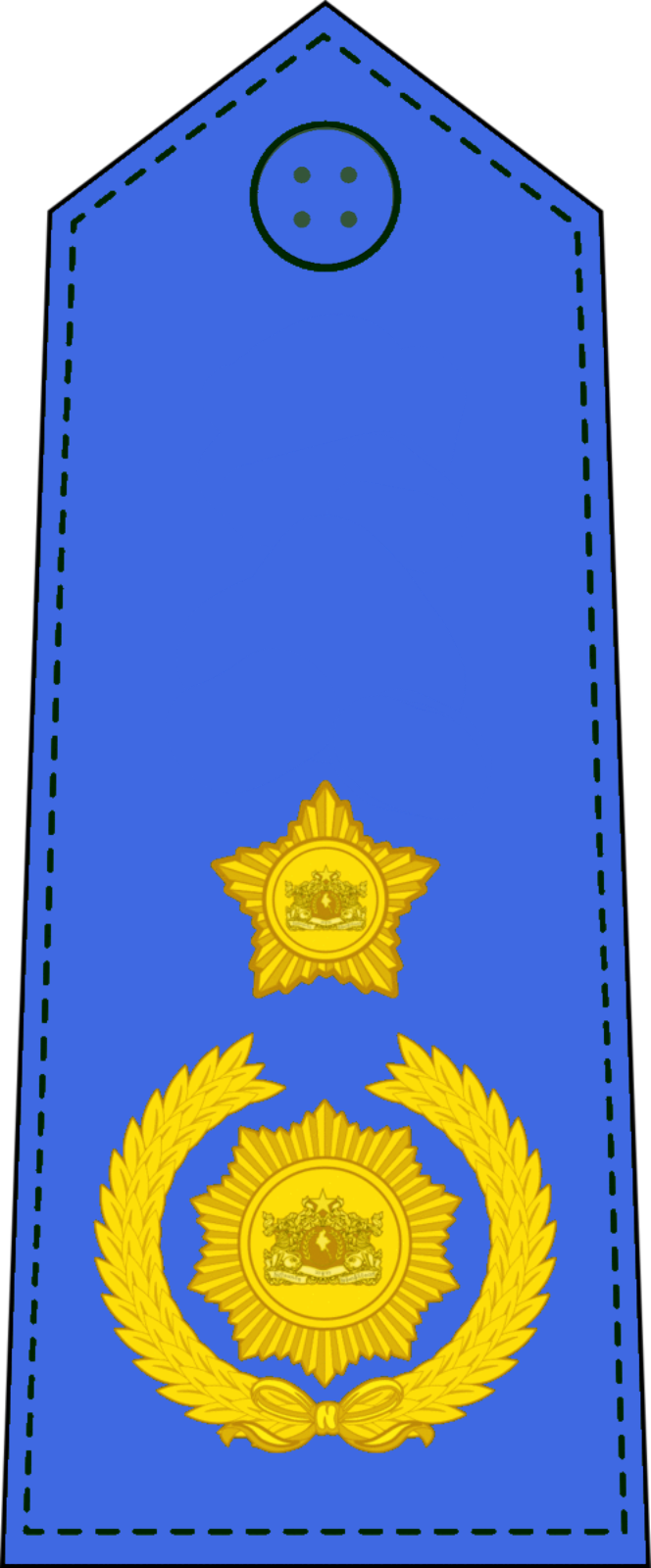
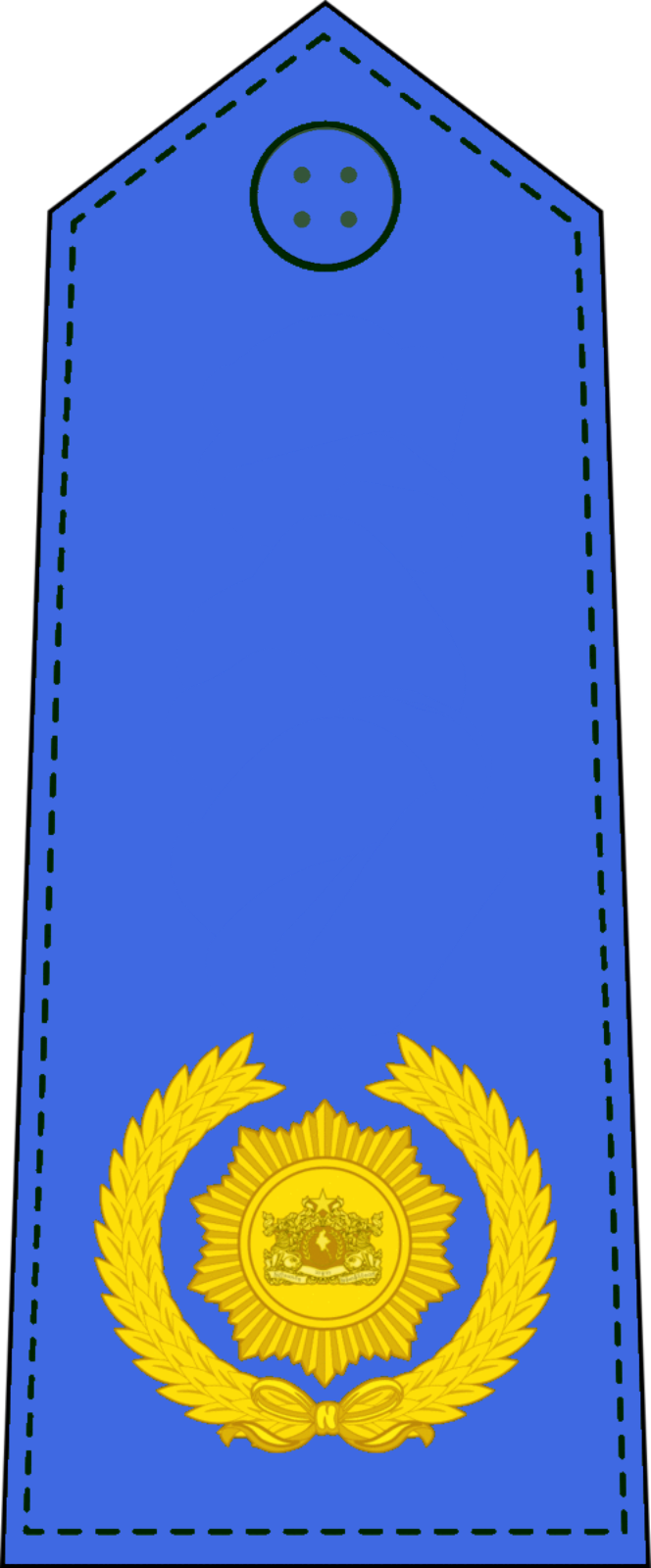
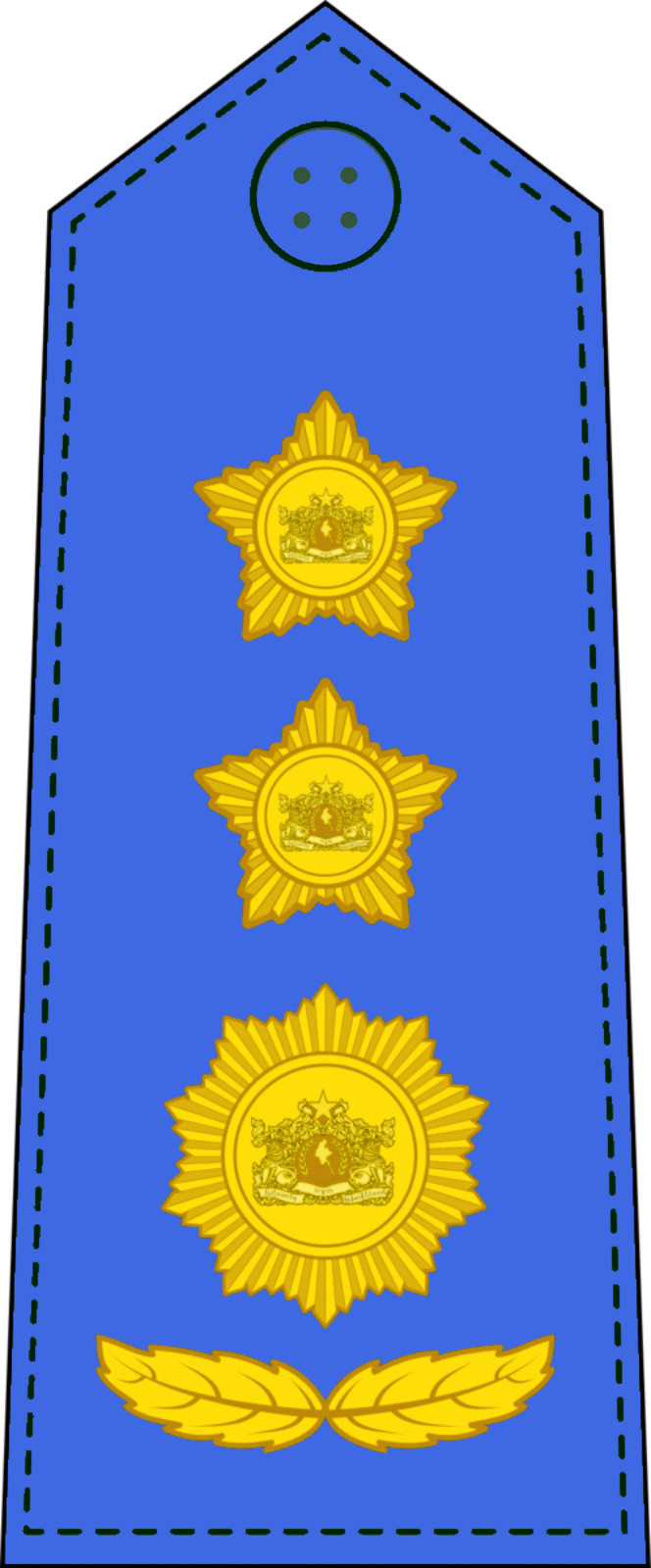
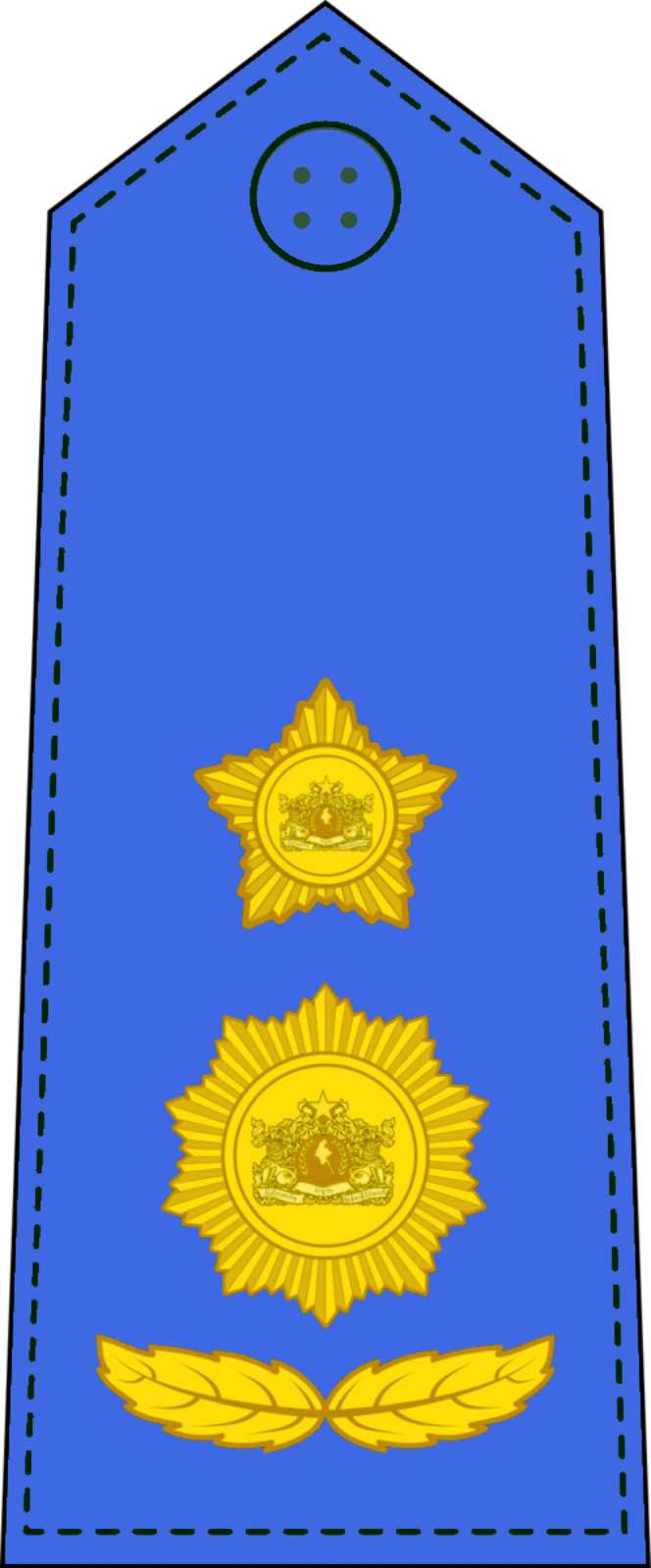
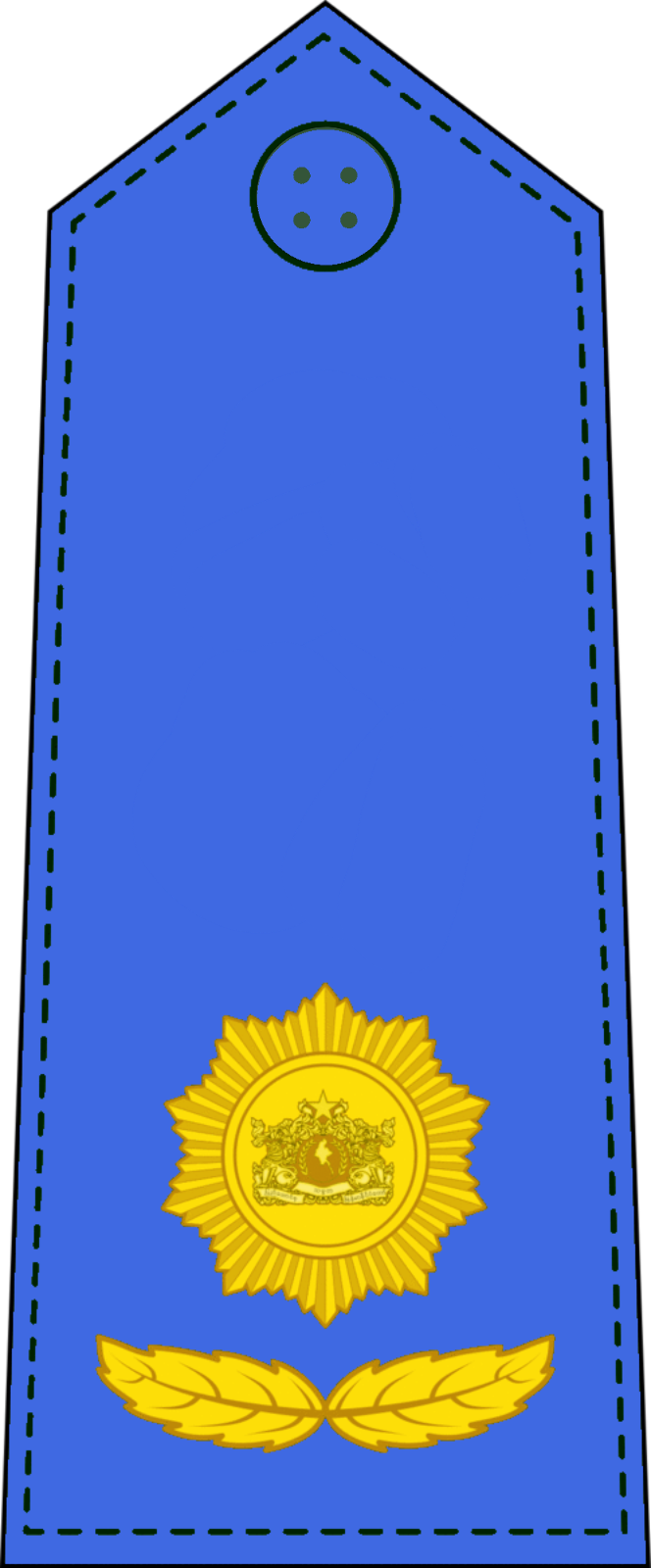
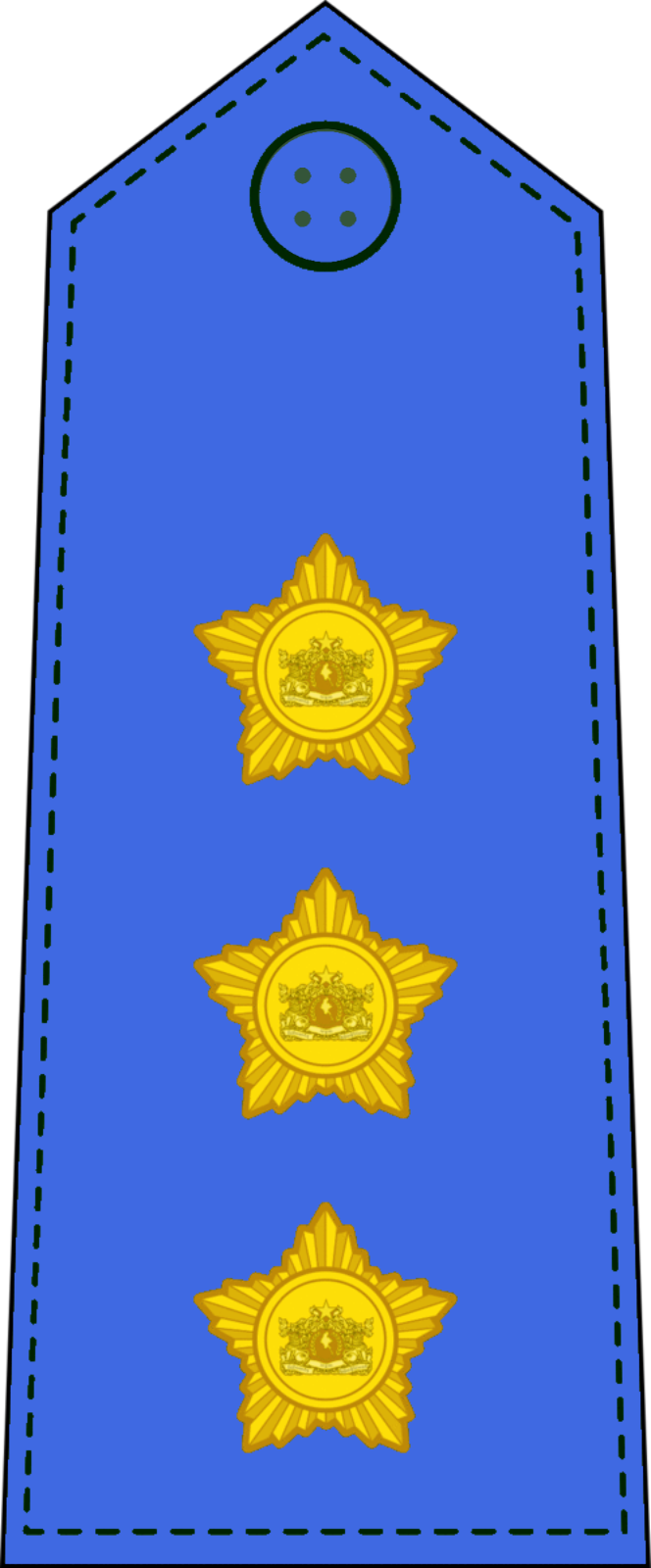
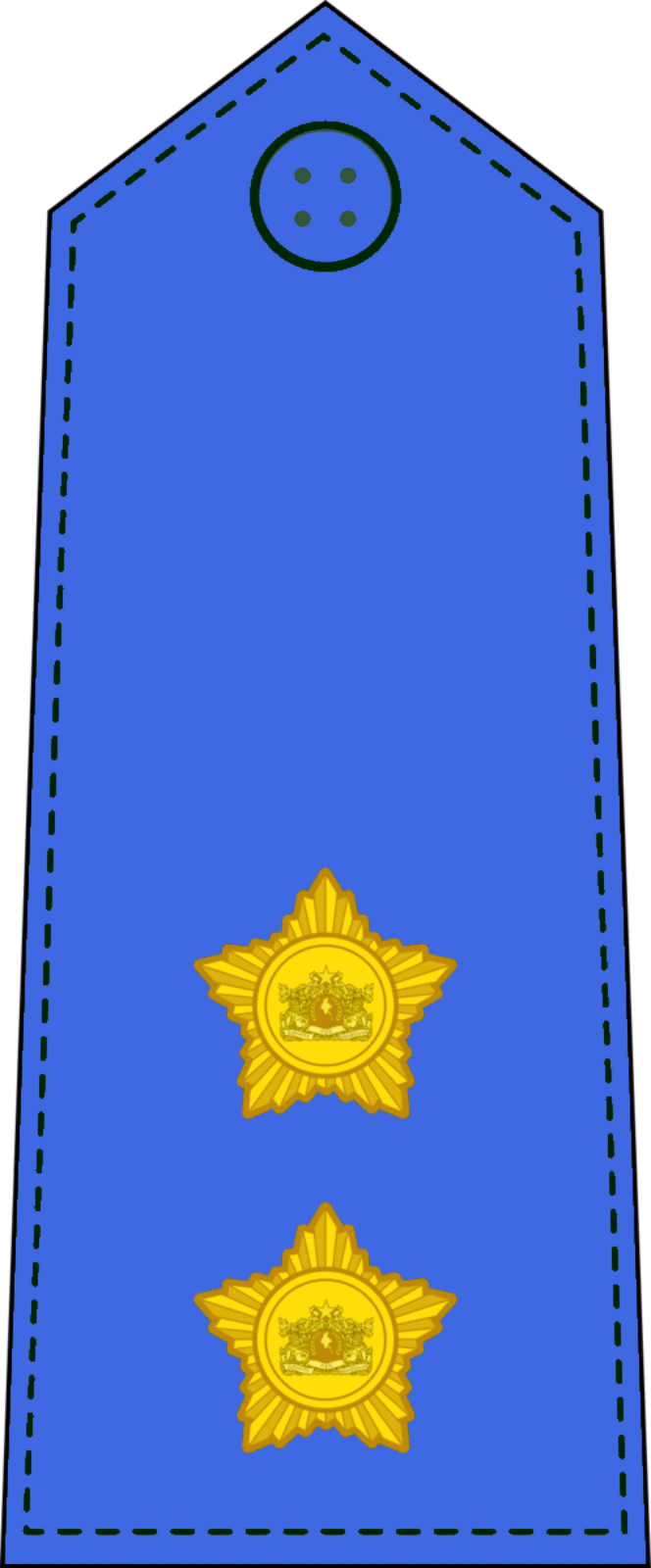
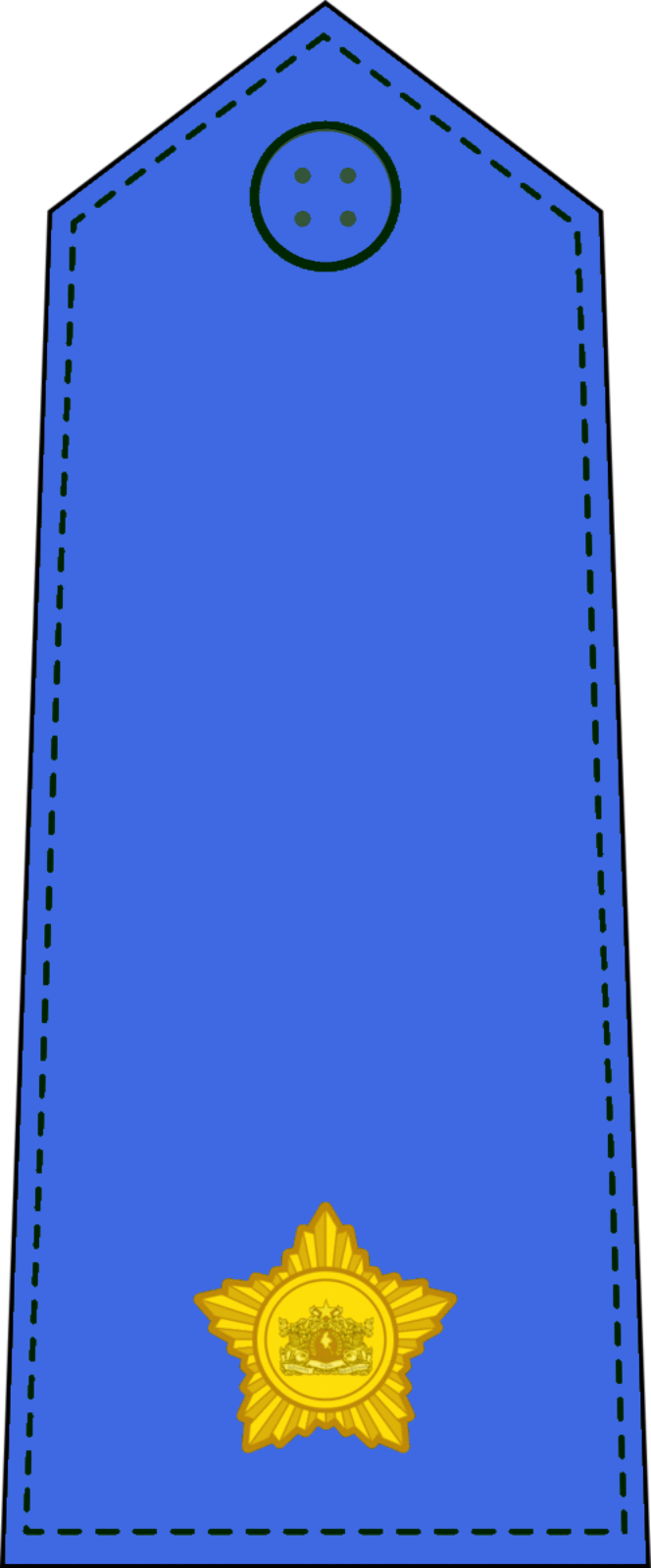
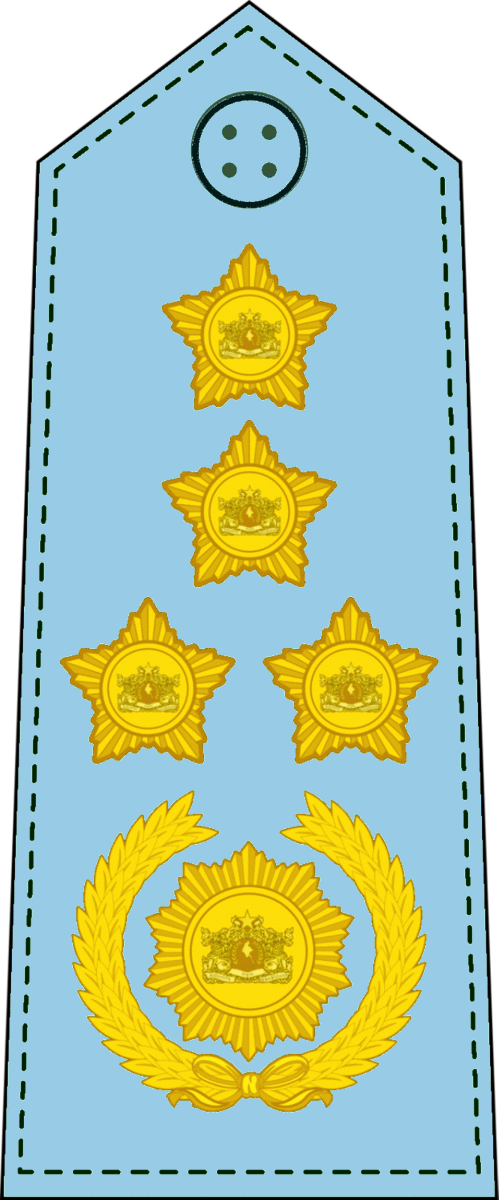
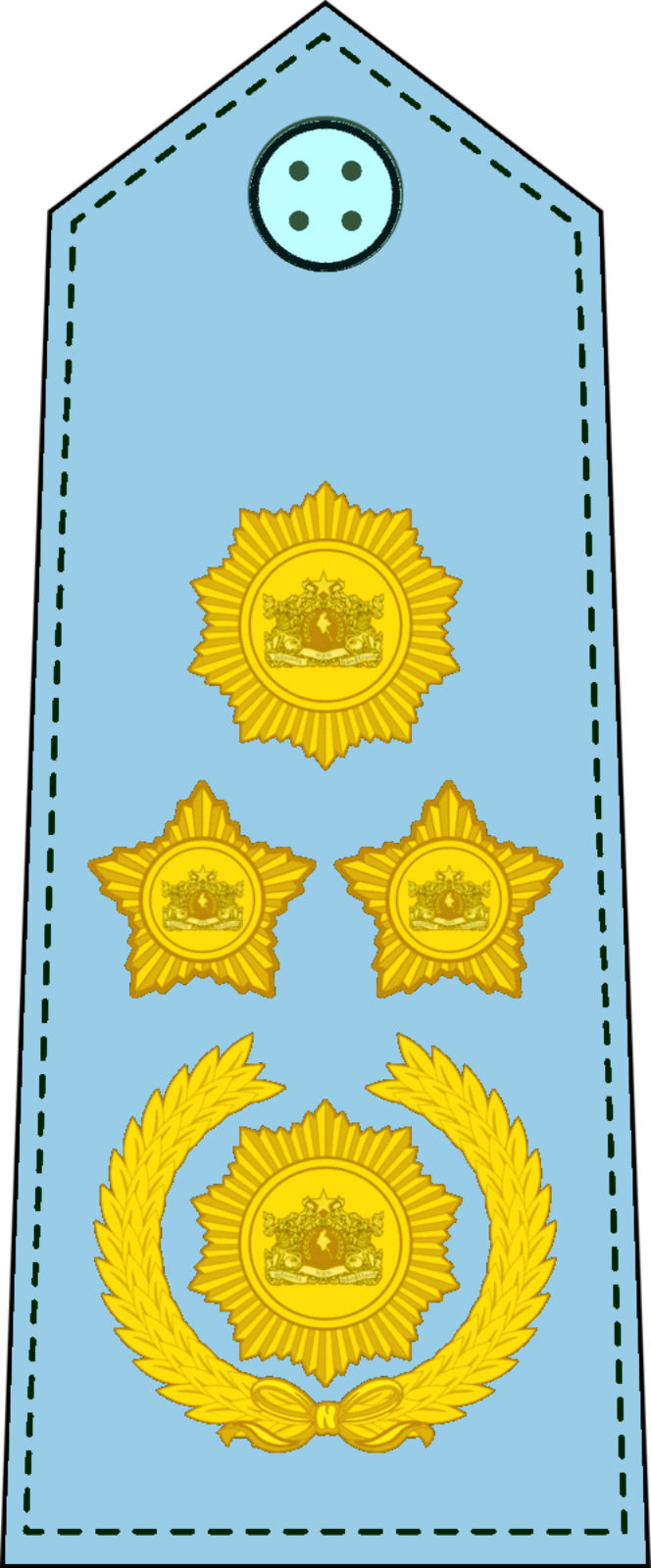
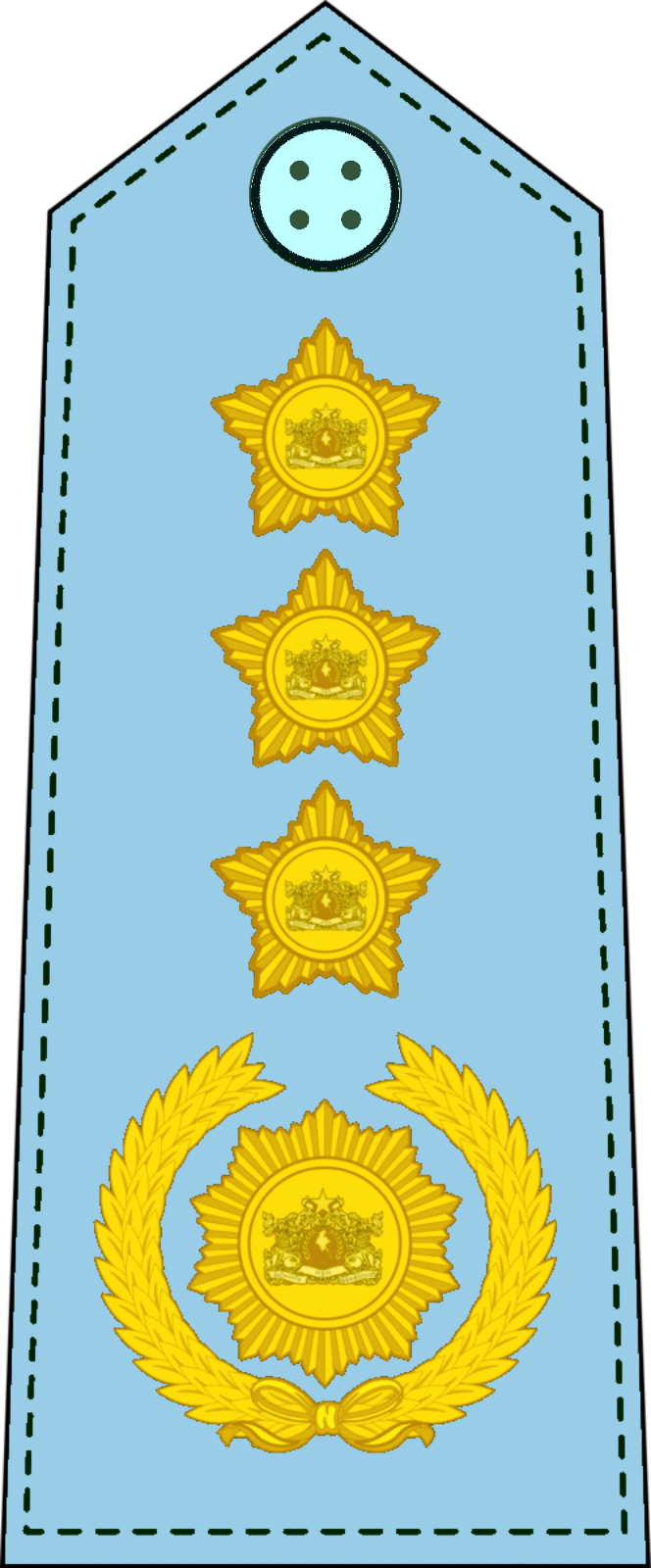
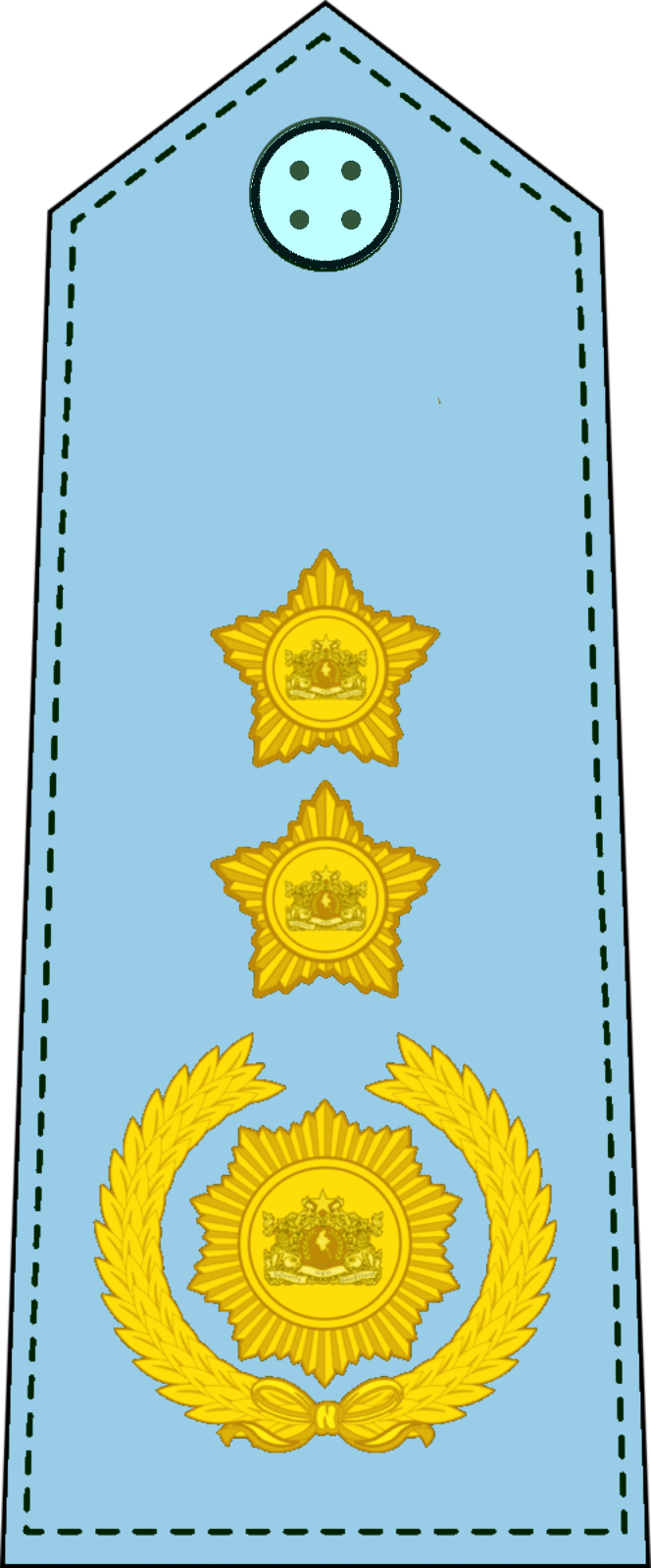
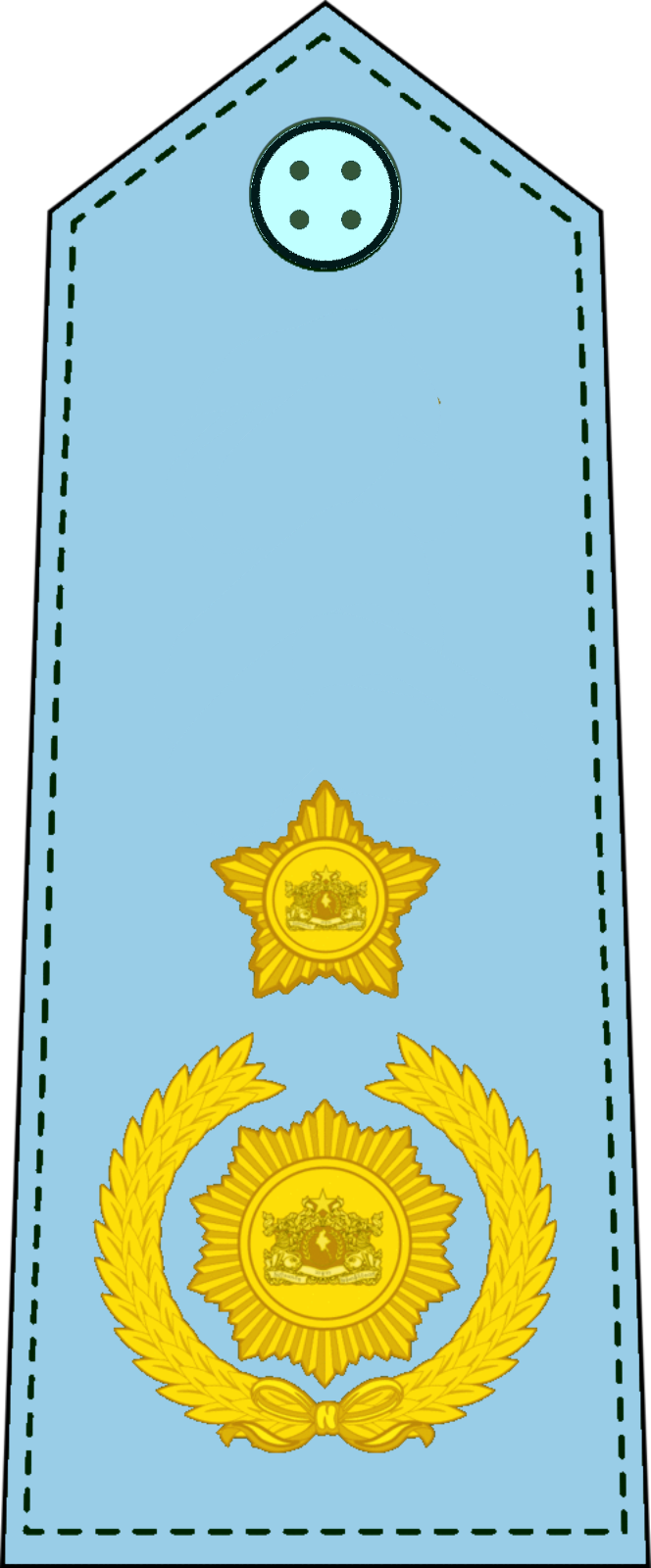
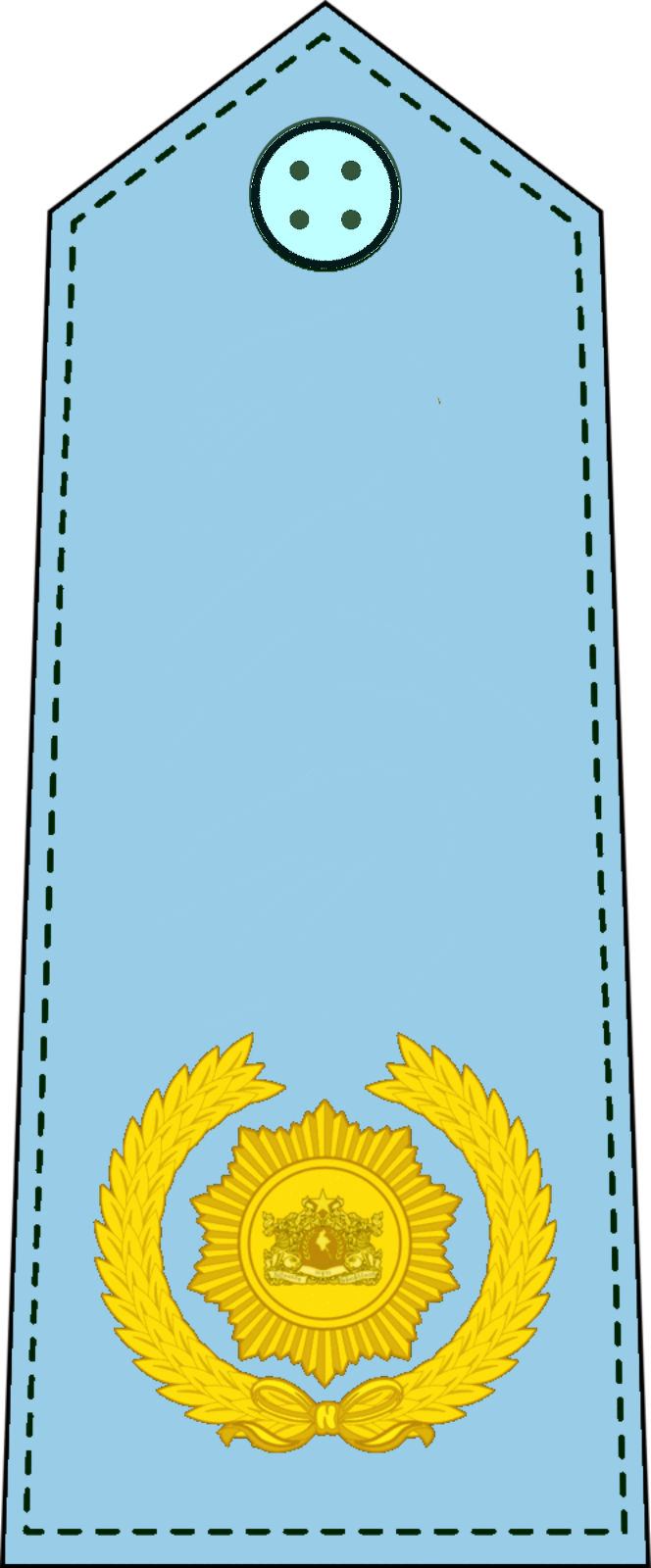
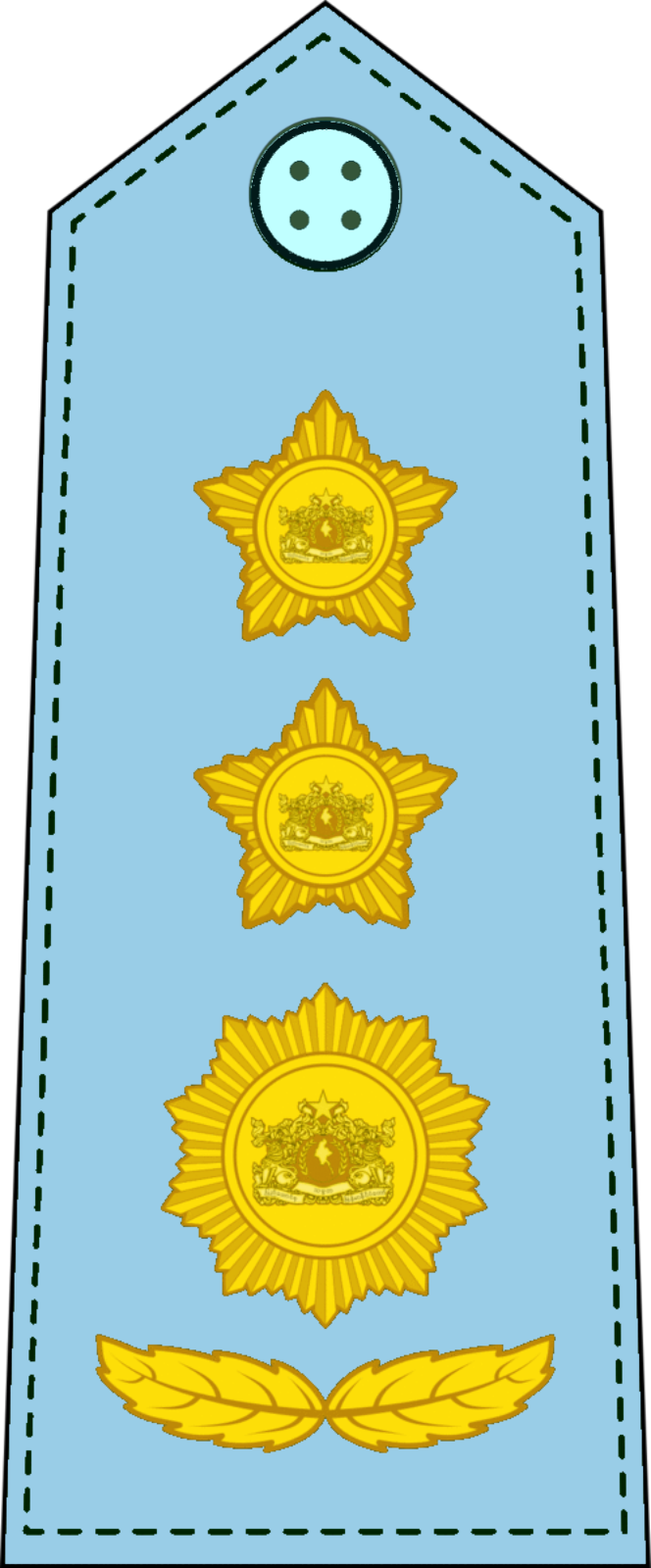
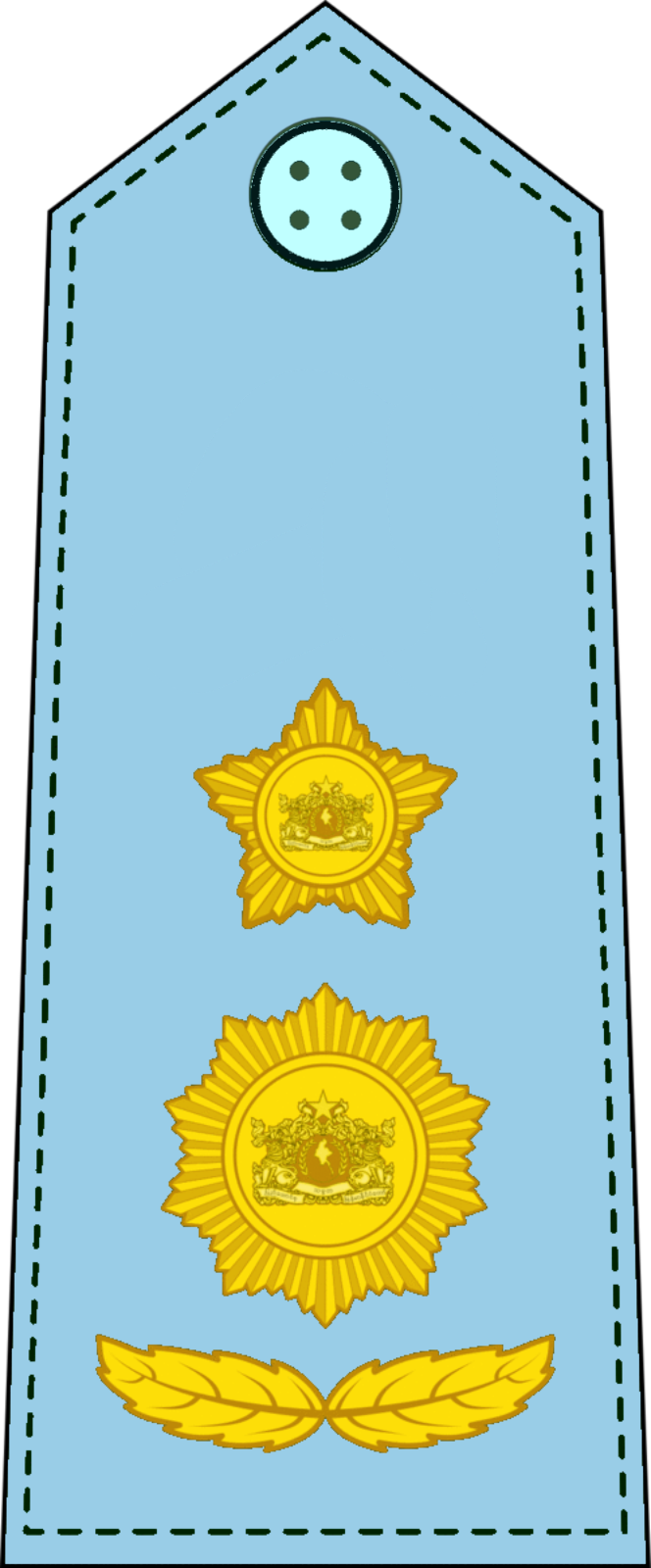
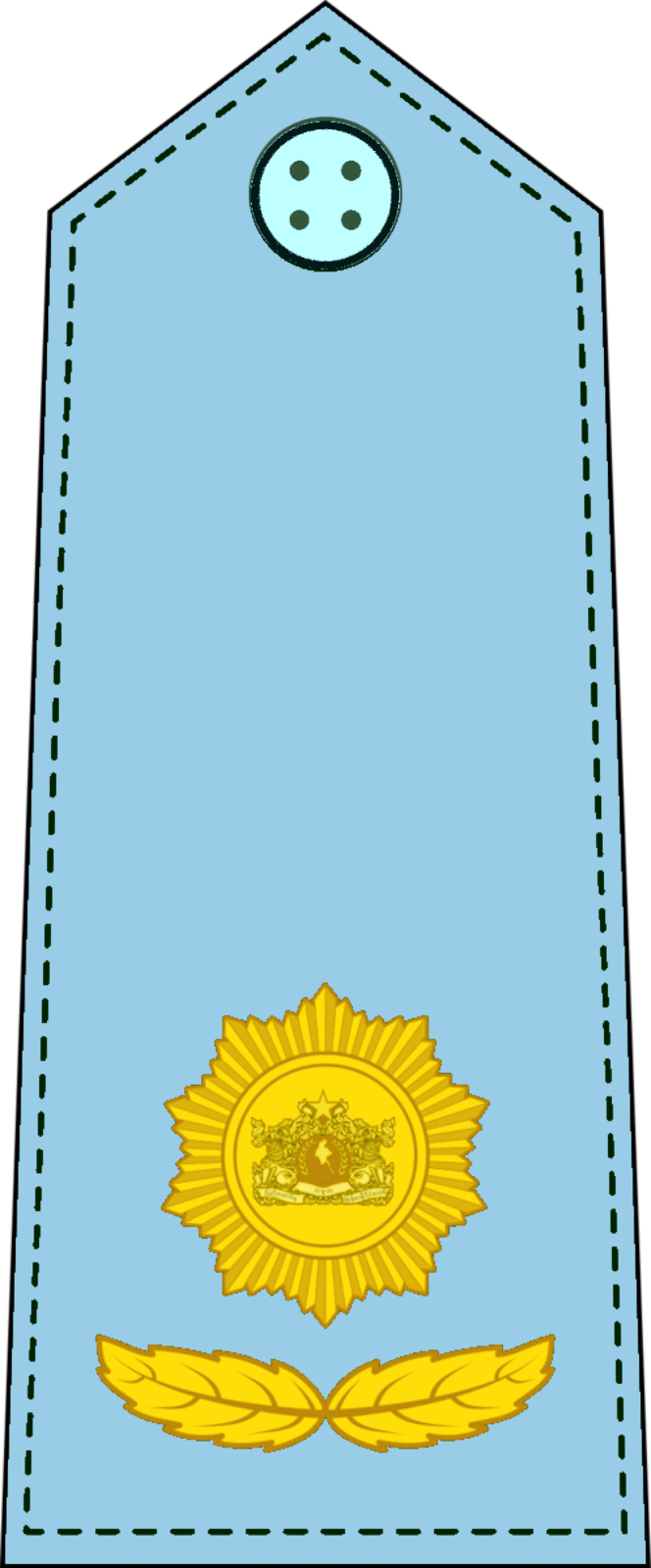
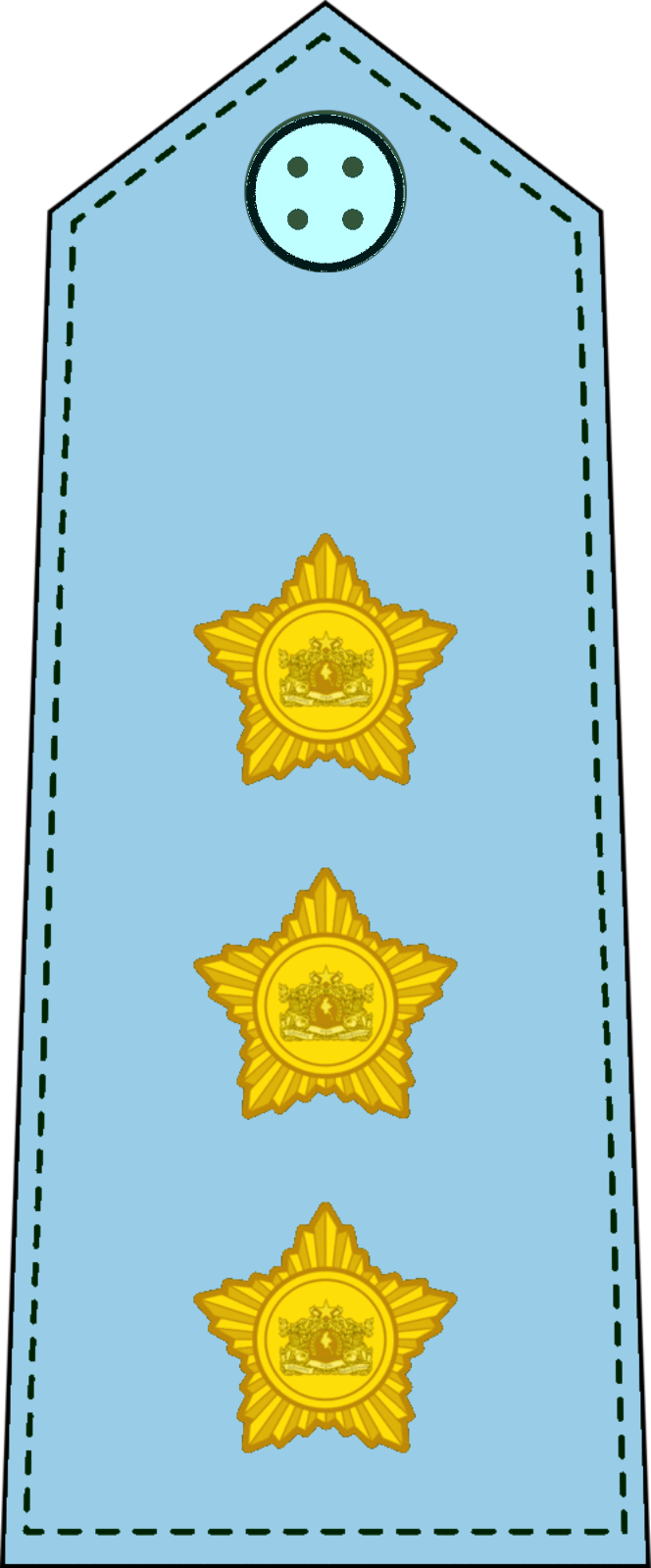
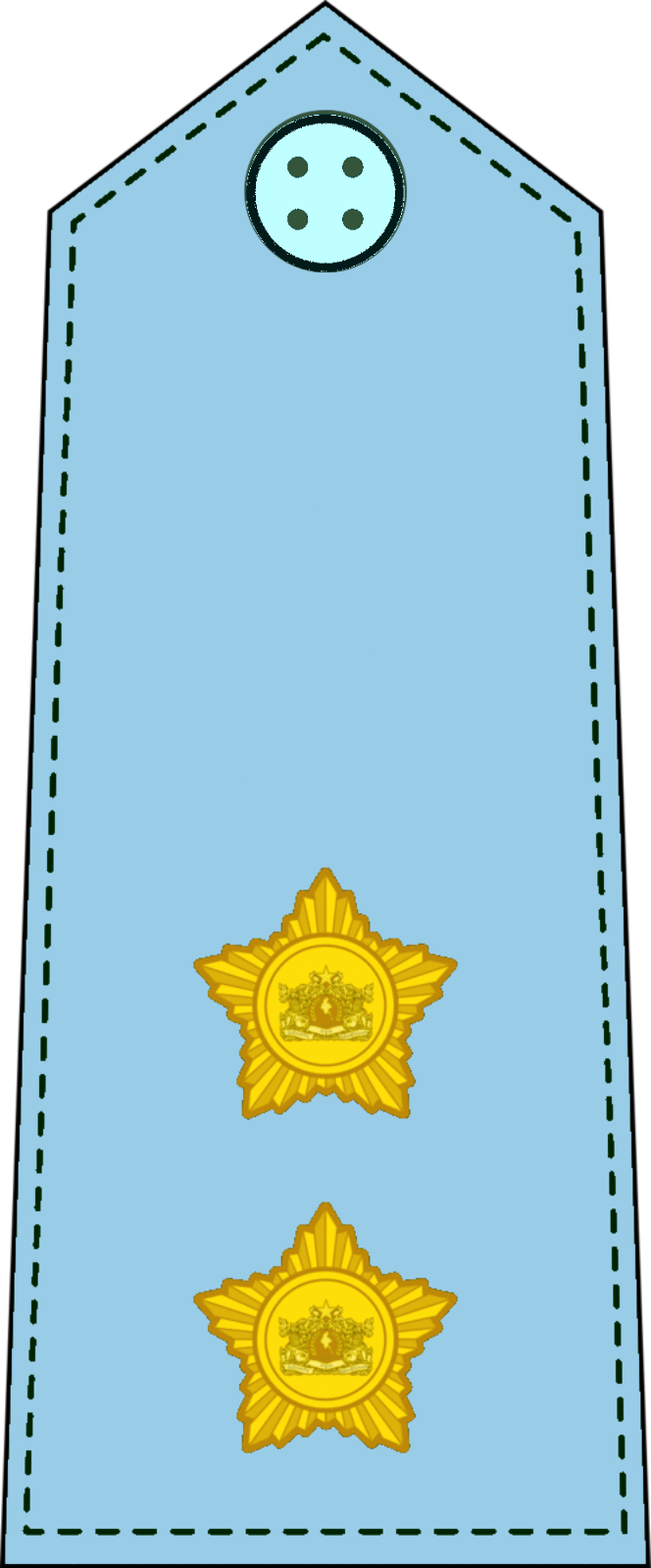
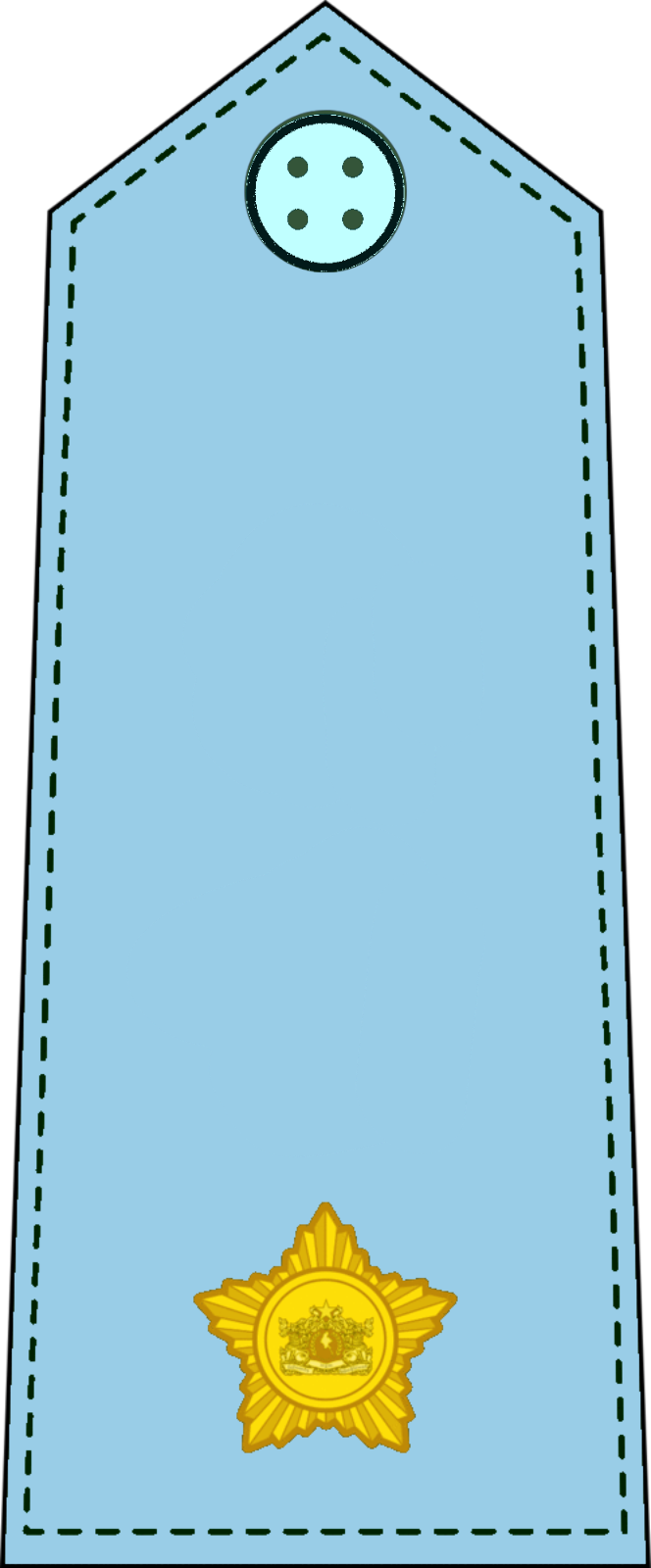
Rank group	General / flag officers						Senior officers			Junior officers
Burmese	ဗိုလ်ချုပ်မှူးကြီး	ဒုတိယဗိုလ်ချုပ်မှူးကြီး	ဗိုလ်ချုပ်ကြီး	ဒုတိယဗိုလ်ချူပ်ကြီး/ဒုဗိုလ်ချုပ်ကြီး	ဗိုလ်ချုပ်	ဗိုလ်မှူးချုပ်	ဗိုလ်မှူးကြီး	ဒုတိယဗိုလ်မှူးကြီး/ဒုဗိုလ်မှူးကြီး	ဗိုလ်မှူး	ဗိုလ်ကြီး	ဗိုလ်	ဒုတိယဗိုလ်/ဒုဗိုလ်
ALA-LC	Builʻkhyupʻmhūʺkrīʺ	Dutiya builʻkhyupʻmhūʺkrīʺ	Builʻkhyupʻkrīʺ	Dutiya builʻkhyupʻkrīʺ	Builʻkhyupʻ	Builʻmhūʺkhyupʻ	Builʻmhūʺkrīʺ	Dutiya builʻmhūʺkrīʺ	Builʻmhūʺ	Builʻkrīʺ	Builʻ	Dutiyabuilʻ
Myanmar Defence Services
Full dress
Army casual uniform
Navy casual uniform
Navy sleeve
Air Force casual uniform
Army and air force translation	Senior general	Vice-senior general	General	Lieutenant general	Major general	Brigadier general	Colonel	Lieutenant colonel	Major	Captain	Lieutenant	Second lieutenant
Navy translation	Senior general	Vice-senior general	Admiral	Vice admiral	Rear admiral	Commodore	Captain	Commander	Lieutenant commander	Lieutenant	Lieutenant (junior grade)	Sub-lieutenant

=== Student officer ranks ===
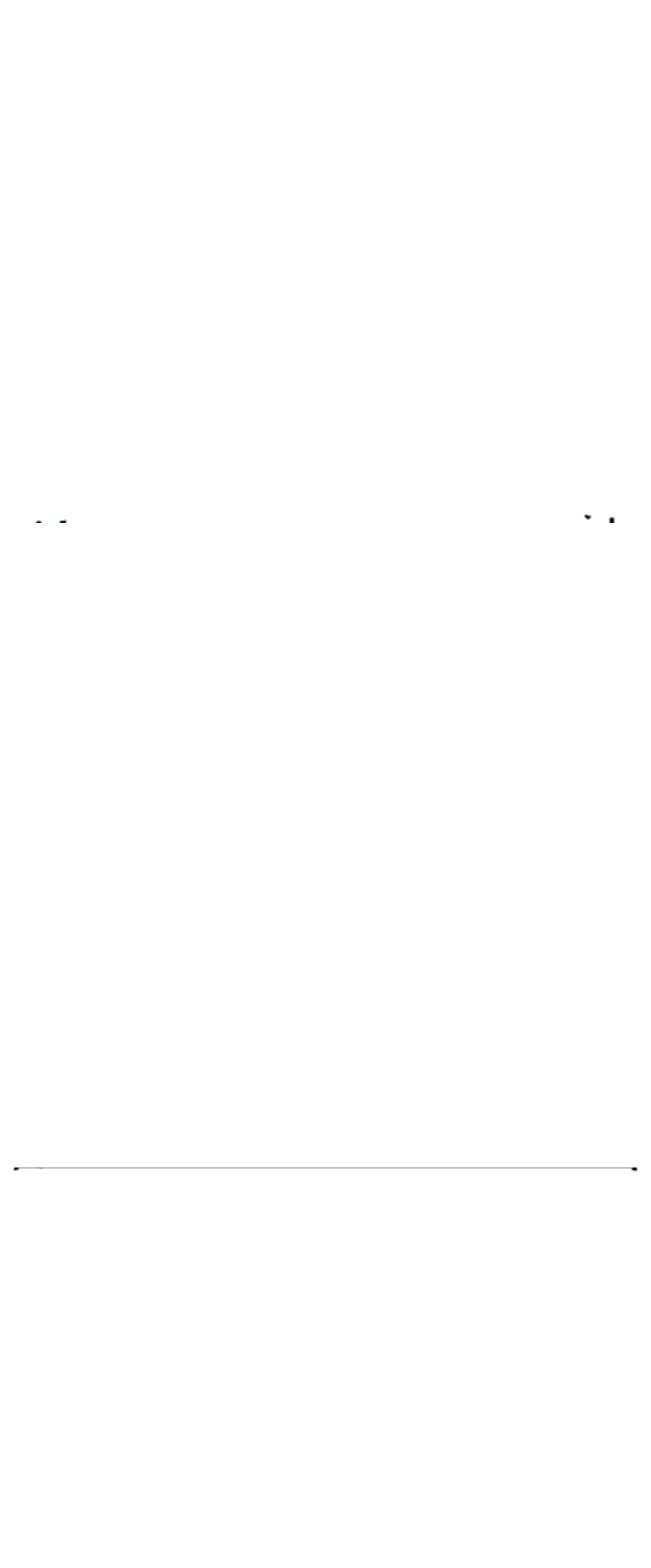
Rank group	Student officer
Burmese	ဗိုလ်လောင်း
ALA-LC	boloṅʺ
Myanmar Armed Forces
Translation	Officer cadet

==== Special insignia of general/flag officers ====
In addition the general/flag officers have additional special insignia.

Burmese title	ဗိုလ်ချုပ်မှူးကြီး	ဒုတိယဗိုလ်ချုပ်မှူးကြီး	ဗိုလ်ချုပ်ကြီး	ဒုတိယဗိုလ်ချုပ်ကြီး	ဗိုလ်ချုပ်	ဗိုလ်မှူးချုပ်
English title	Senior general	Vice-senior general	General/ Admiral	Lieutenant general/ Vice admiral	Major general/ Rear admiral	Brigadier general/ Commodore
Rank medal worn on left chest						
Rank stars on name plate of car						

=== Other ranks ===
In Myanmar Defence Services, Lance corporals and Corporals are commonly referred to as Saya (ဆရာ, lit. 'teacher') by both enlisted staffs and officers. Warrant officers (Class 1 and Class 2) are referred to as Bo Lay (ဗိုလ်လေး, lit. 'little lieutenant'), Sergeant and Staff Sergeant are referred to as Saya Gyi. These unofficial ranks are in used throughout the daily life of all branches of Myanmar Defence Services. Insignia-wearing OR within the Myanmar Defence Services are usually seasoned veteran soldiers with wide-ranging experience of the battlefield, thus both officers and enlisted men refer to them as "teacher" out of respect as well as affection.

Rank group	Other Ranks (Insignia Wearing)						Other Ranks (No Insignia)
Burmese	အရာခံဗိုလ်	ဒုတိယအရာခံဗိုလ်/ဒုအရာခံဗိုလ်	တပ်ခွဲတပ်ကြပ်ကြီး/ အုပ်ခွဲတပ်ကြပ်ကြီး	တပ်ကြပ်ကြီး/ တပ်ကြပ်ကြီး (စာရေး)	တပ်ကြပ်	ဒုတိယတပ်ကြပ်/ဒုတပ်ကြပ်	တပ်သား	တပ်သားသစ်
ALA-LC	'araākhaṃ bauilaʻ	dautaiya 'araākhaṃ bauilaʻ	tapaʻ khavai tapaʻ karpaʻ karīʺ/ aupaʻ khavai tapaʻ karpaʻ karīʺ	tapaʻ karpaʻ karīʺ/ tapaʻ karpaʻ karīʺ caā raeʺ	tapaʻ karpaʻ	dautai yatapaʻ karpaʻ	tapaʻ saāʺ	tapaʻ saāʺ
Myanmar Defence Services							No insignia	No insignia
Army translation	Warrant officer class 1	Warrant officer class 2	Staff Sergeant (aka Company Quartermaster Sergeant)	Sergeant/ Sergeant (Clerk)	Corporal	Lance corporal	Private	Recruit
Navy translation	Warrant officer class 1	Warrant officer class 2	Chief petty officer	Petty officer/ Petty Officer (clerk)	Leading seaman	Acting leading	Able-body	Recruit
Air force translation	Warrant officer class 1	Warrant officer class 2	Flight sergeant	Sergeant/ Sergeant (clerk)	Corporal	Lance corporal	Private	Recruit

== Myanmar Police Force ==
Myanmar Police Force is an independent department of the Ministry of Home Affairs, one of the ministries under administration of Commander-in-Chief of Defence Services. The rank insignia of Myanmar Police Force are the insignia of Myanmar Defence Services with different colours and with different titles.

=== Officers ===
In the Myanmar Police Force, a person of the rank of Police second lieutenant and above is called an officer; while an officer of the rank of Police Captain and above is called a gazetted officer.

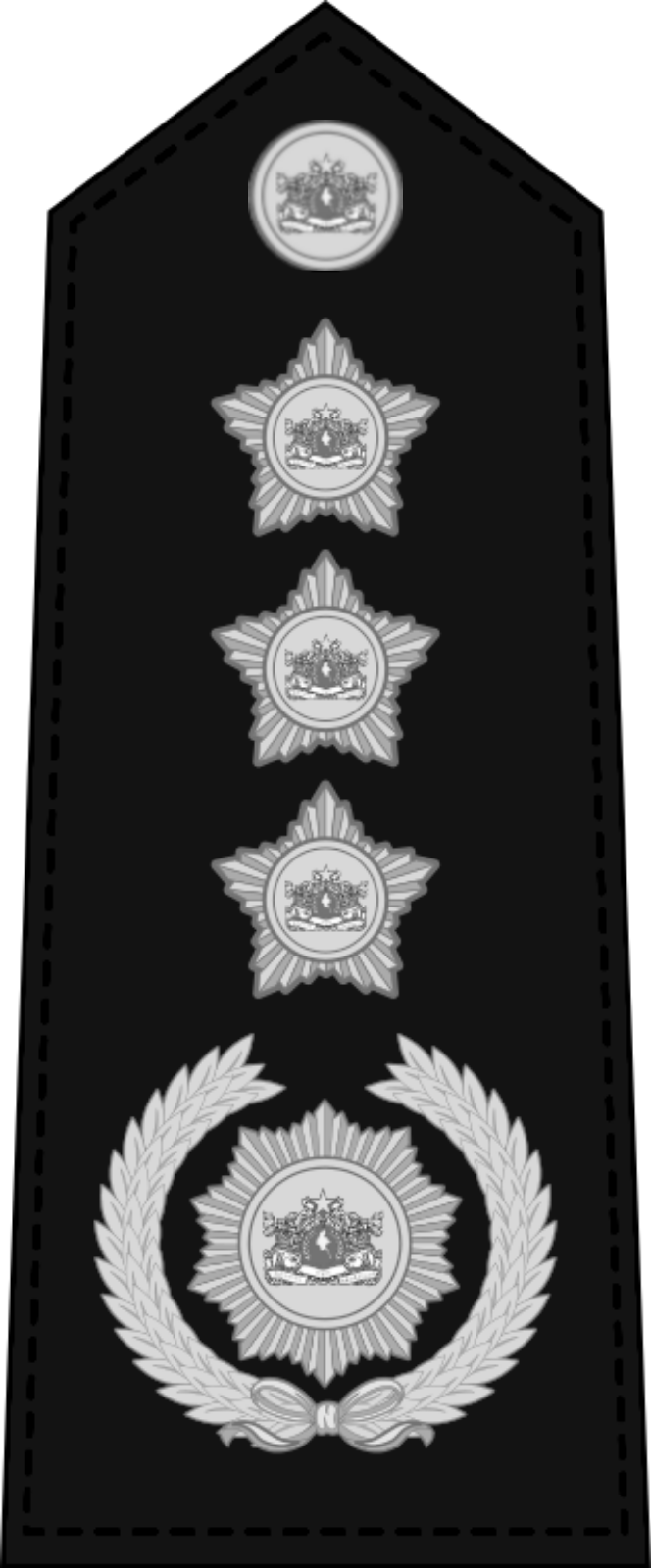
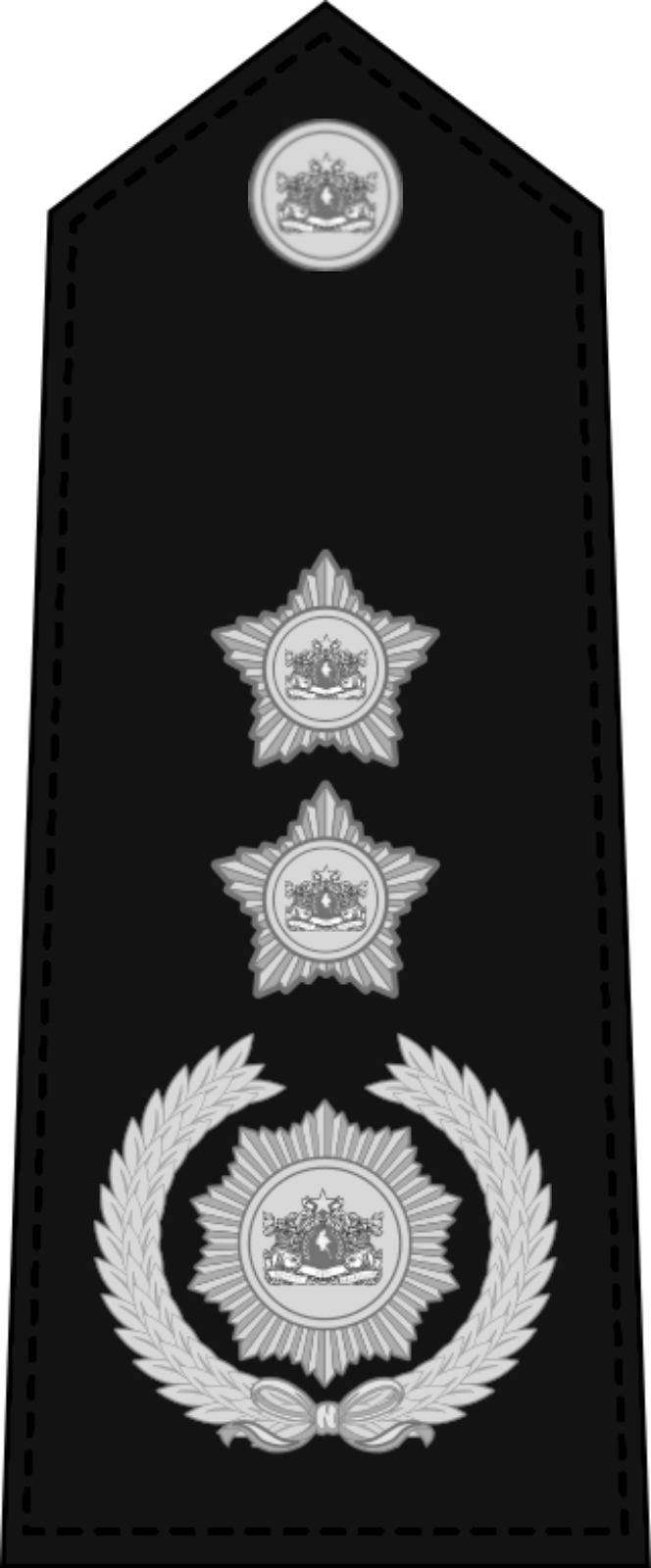
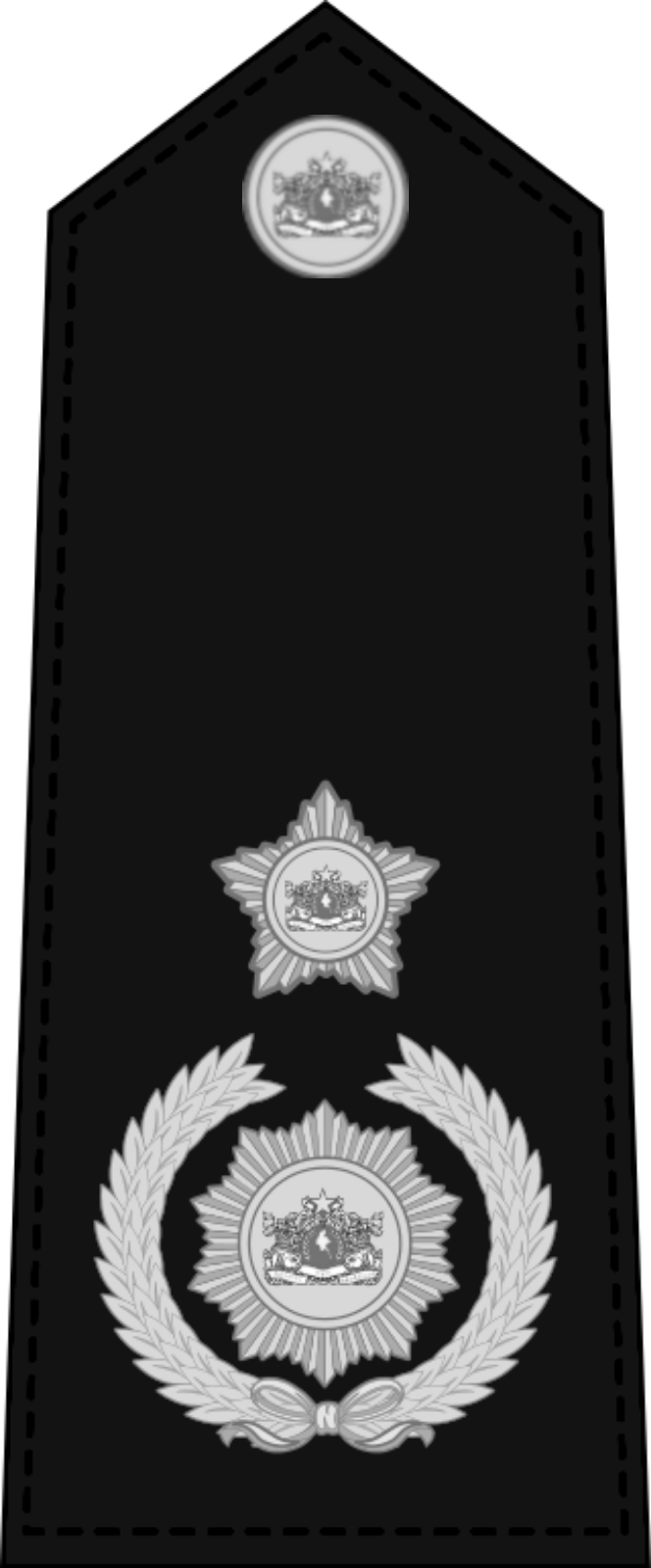
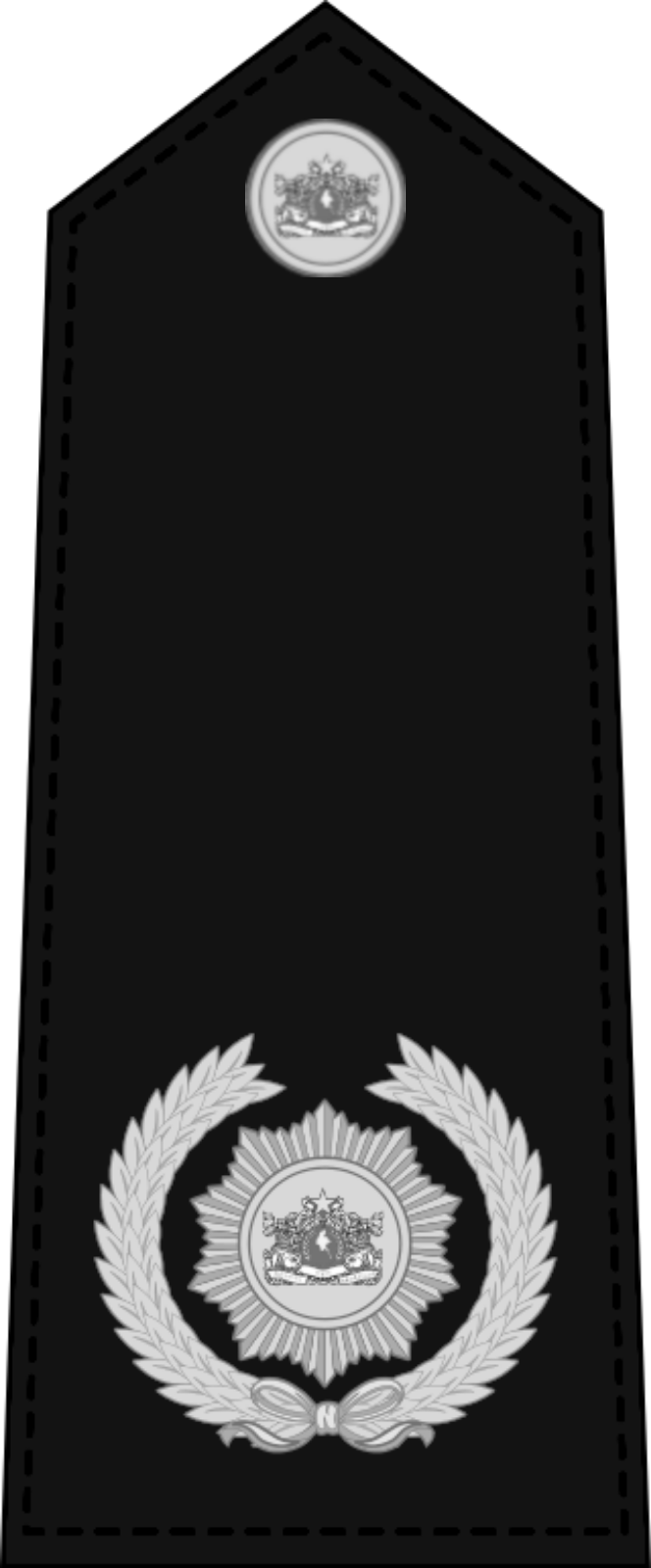
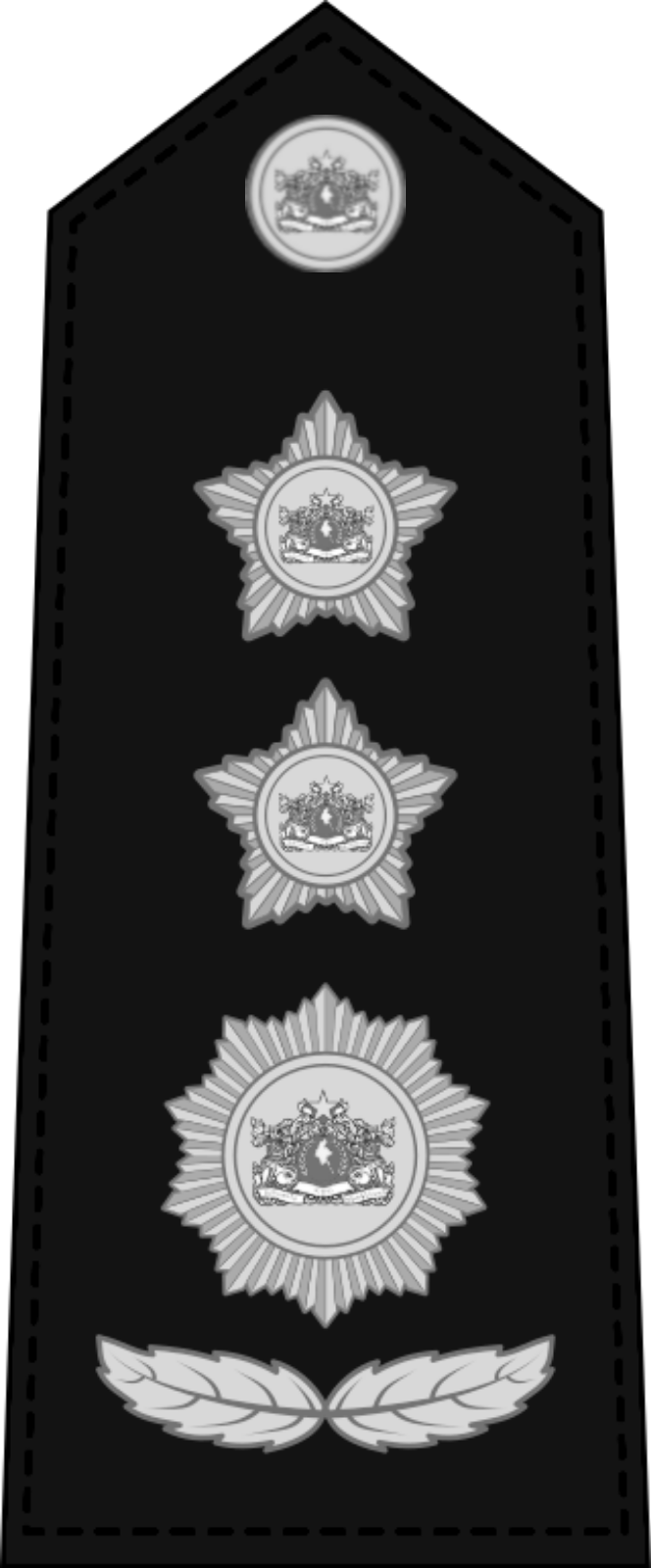
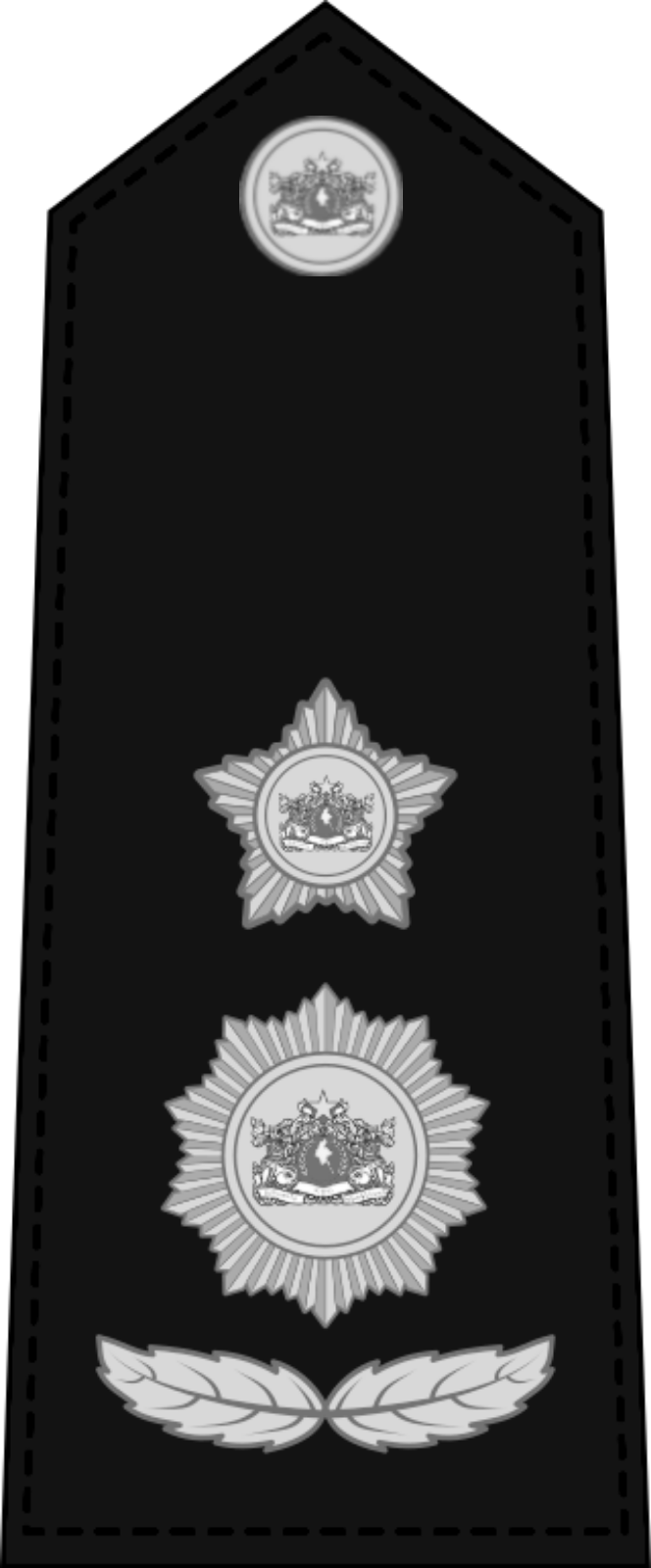
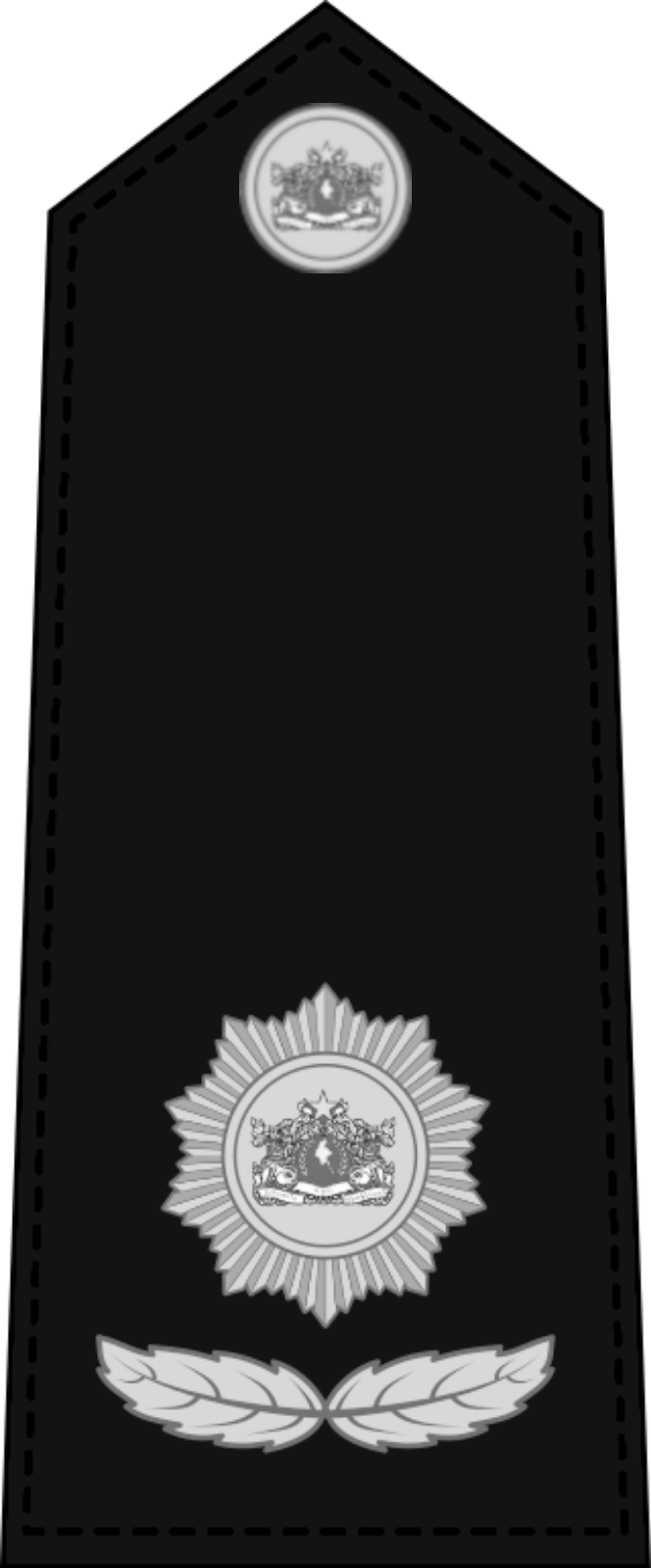
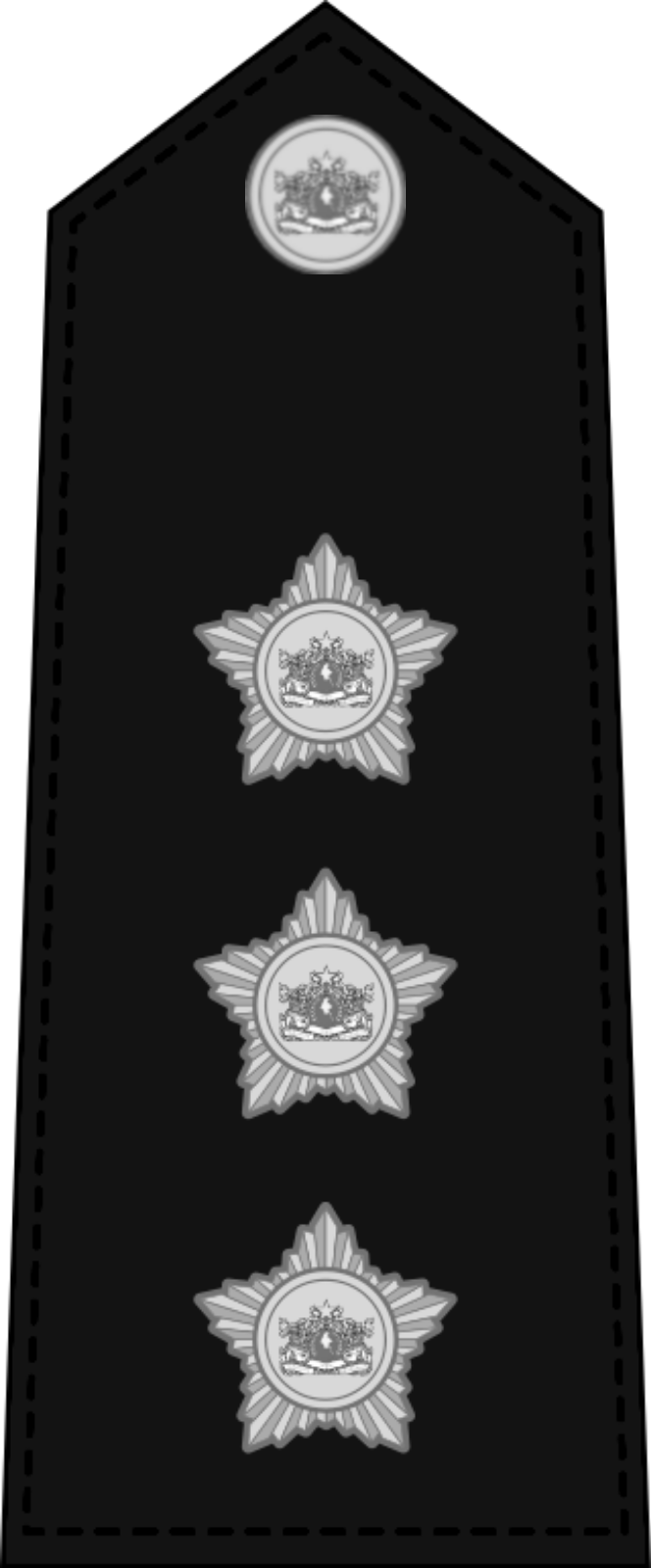
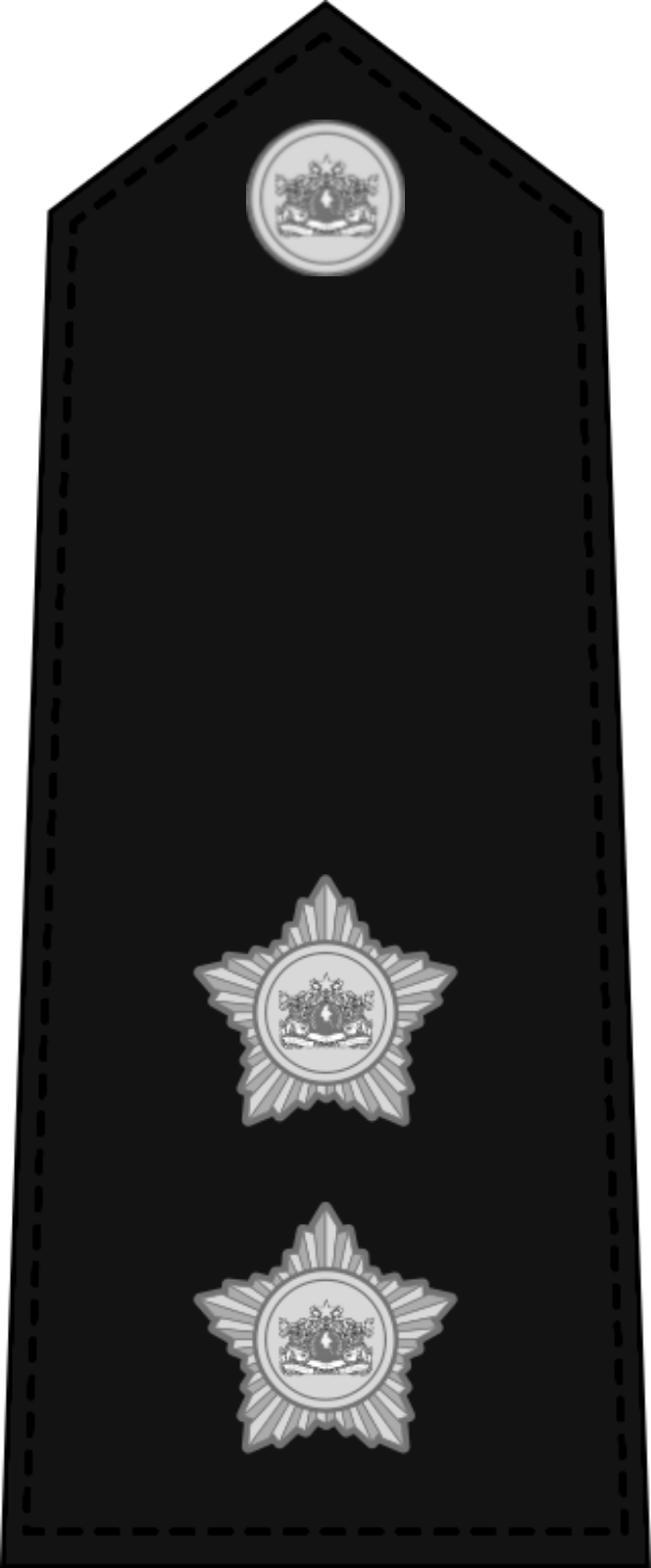
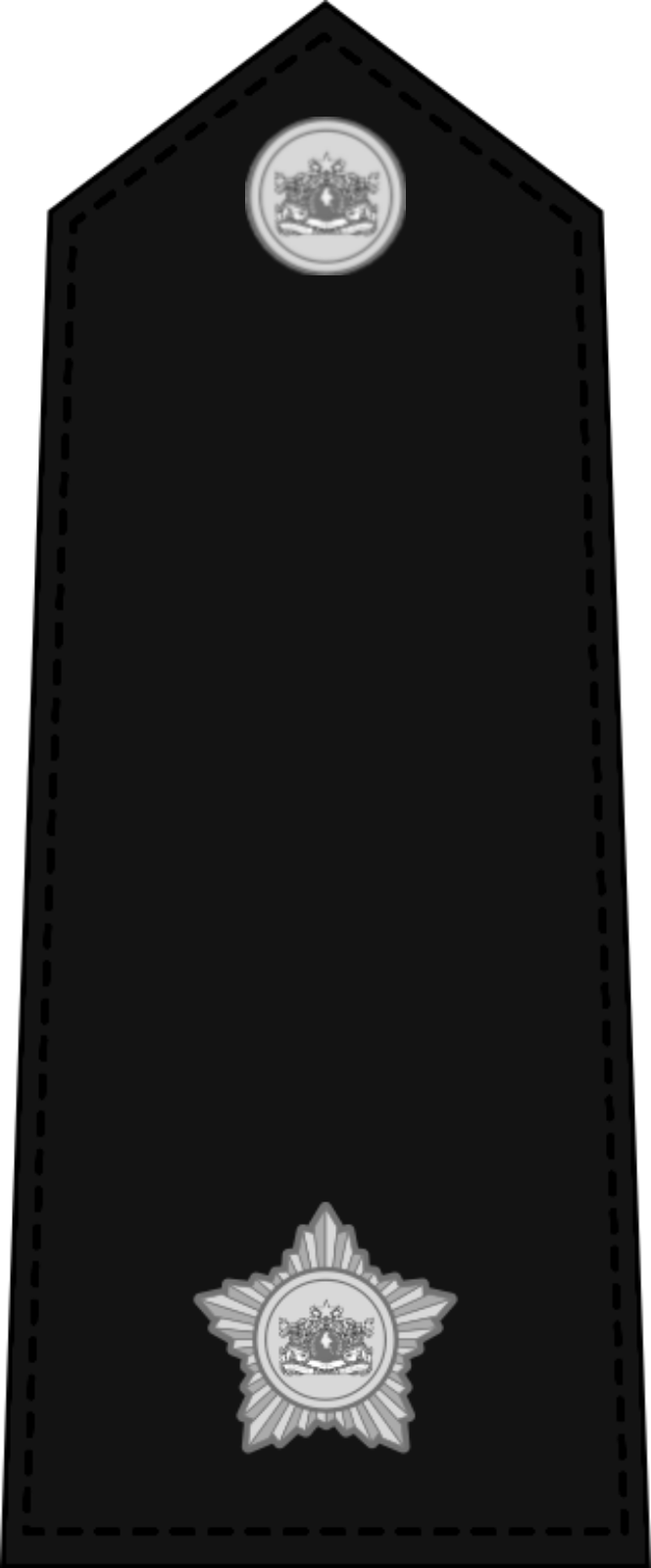
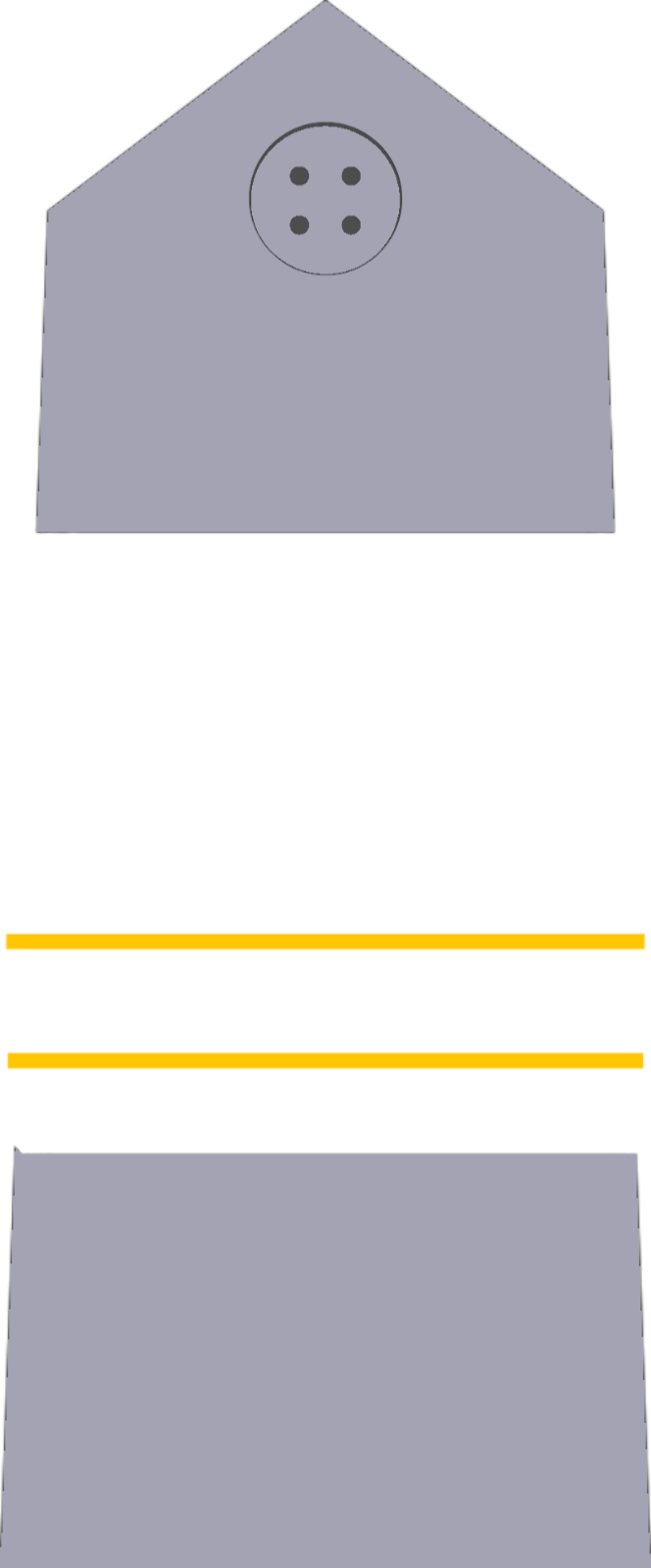
Rank group	General / flag officers				Senior officers			Junior officers
Burmese	ရဲဗိုလ်ချုပ်ကြီး	ဒုတိယရဲဗိုလ်ချုပ်ကြီး	ရဲဗိုလ်ချုပ်	ရဲမှူးချုပ်	ရဲမှူးကြီး	ဒုတိယရဲမှူးကြီး	ရဲမှူး	ဒုတိယရဲမှူး	ရဲအုပ်	ဒုတိယရဲအုပ်	ဒုတိယရဲအုပ်လောင်း
ALA-LC	raaibauilaʻ khayupaʻ krīʺ	dautaiya raaibauilaʻ khayupaʻ krīʺ	raaibauilaʻ khayupaʻ	raaimahūʺ khayupaʻ	raaimahūʺ karī	dautaiya raaimahūʺ karī	raaimahūʺ	dautaiya raaimahūʺ	raai 'aupaʻ	dautaiya raai 'aupaʻ	dautaiya raai 'aupaʻ laoṅaʻʺ
Myanmar Police Force
Translation	Commissioner General	Deputy Commissioner General	Commissioner	Deputy Commissioner	Senior Superintendent	Deputy Senior Superintendent	Superintendent	Senior Inspector	Inspector	Sub-Inspector	Officer Cadet

=== Other ranks ===
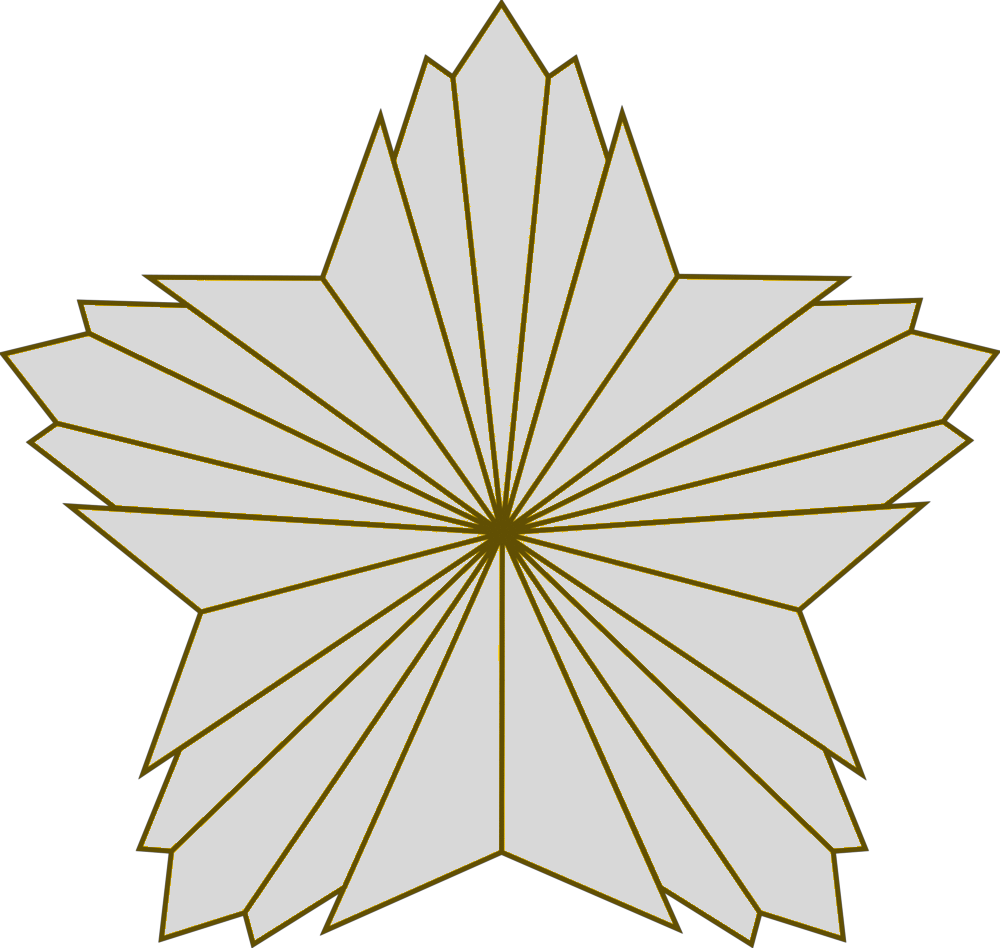
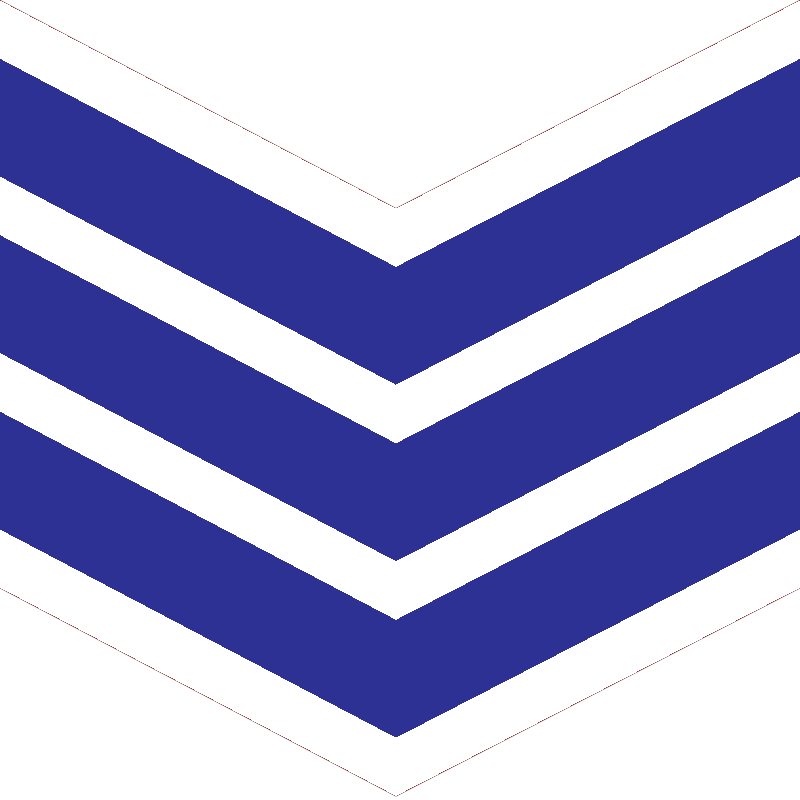
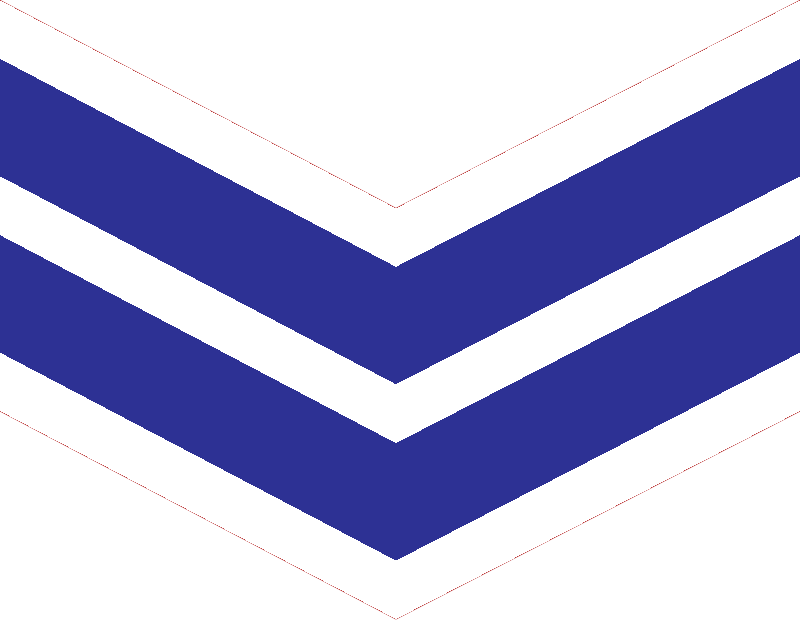
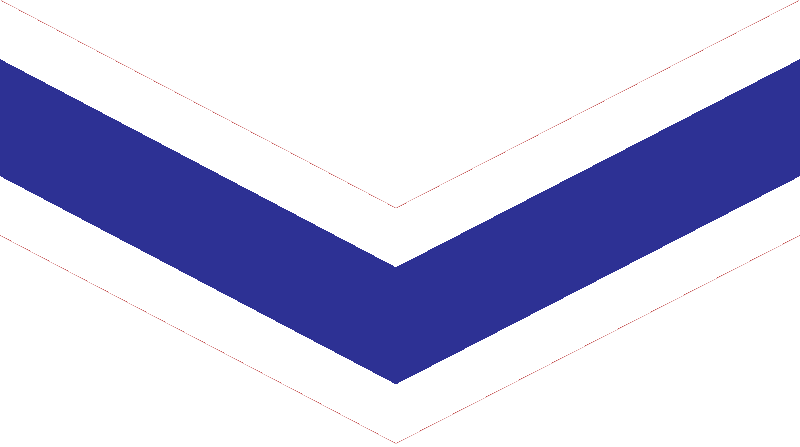
Rank group	Insignia-wearing staffs				Enlisted staffs
Burmese	ရဲအရာခံဗိုလ်	ရဲတပ်ကြပ်ကြီး	ရဲတပ်ကြပ်	ဒုတိယရဲတပ်ကြပ်	ရဲတပ်သား	ရဲတပ်သားသစ်
ALA-LC	Raai 'araā khaṃ bauilaʻ	Raai tapaʻ karpaʻ krīʺ	Raai tapaʻ karpaʻ	Dautaiya raai tapaʻ karpaʻ	Raai tapaʻ saāʺ	Raai tapaʻ saāʺ sacaʻ
Myanmar Police Force					No insignia	No insignia
Translation	Police warrant officer	Police sergeant	Police corporal	Police lance corporal	Police constable	Recruit

== Prisons Department ==
Prisons Department is a department of the Ministry of Home Affairs, one of the ministries under administration of Commander-in-Chief of Defence Services. The rank insignia of its officers are the same as that of Myanmar Police Force but with different titles.

=== Officers ===
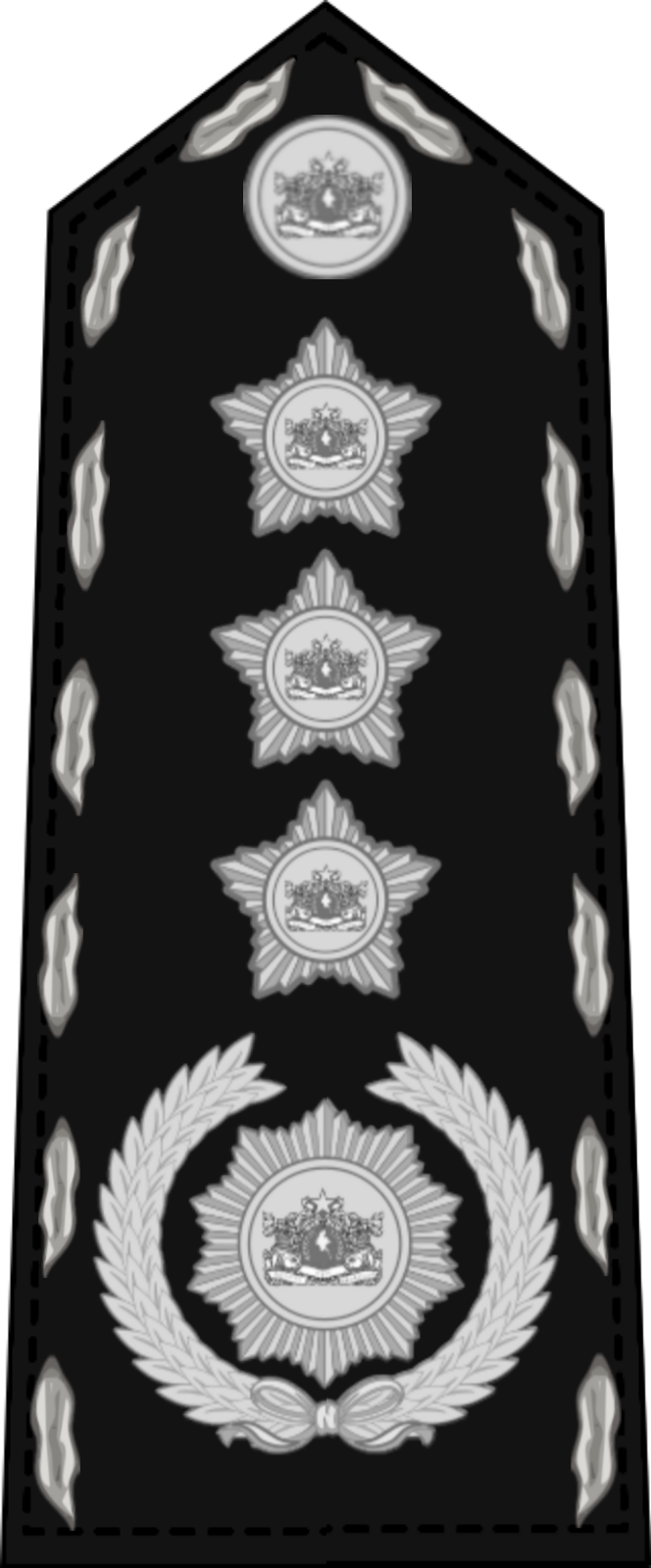
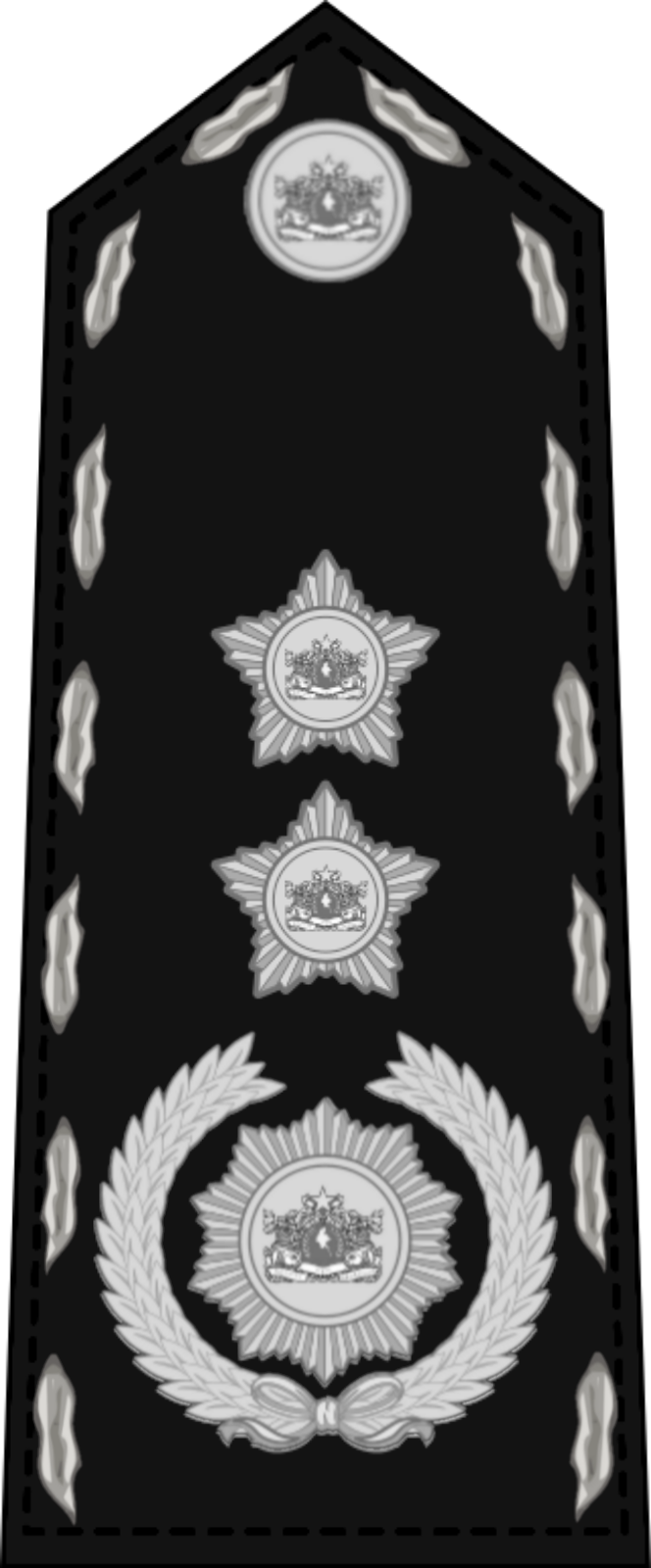
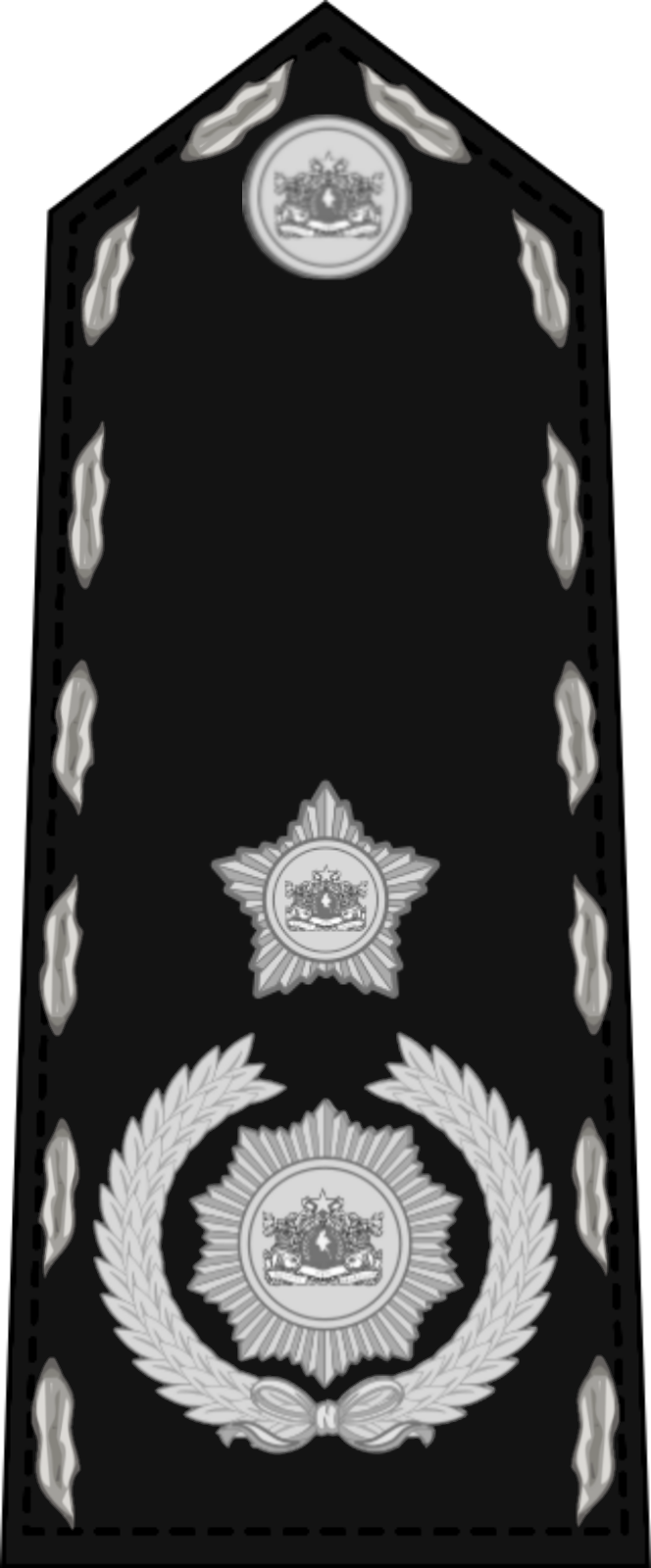
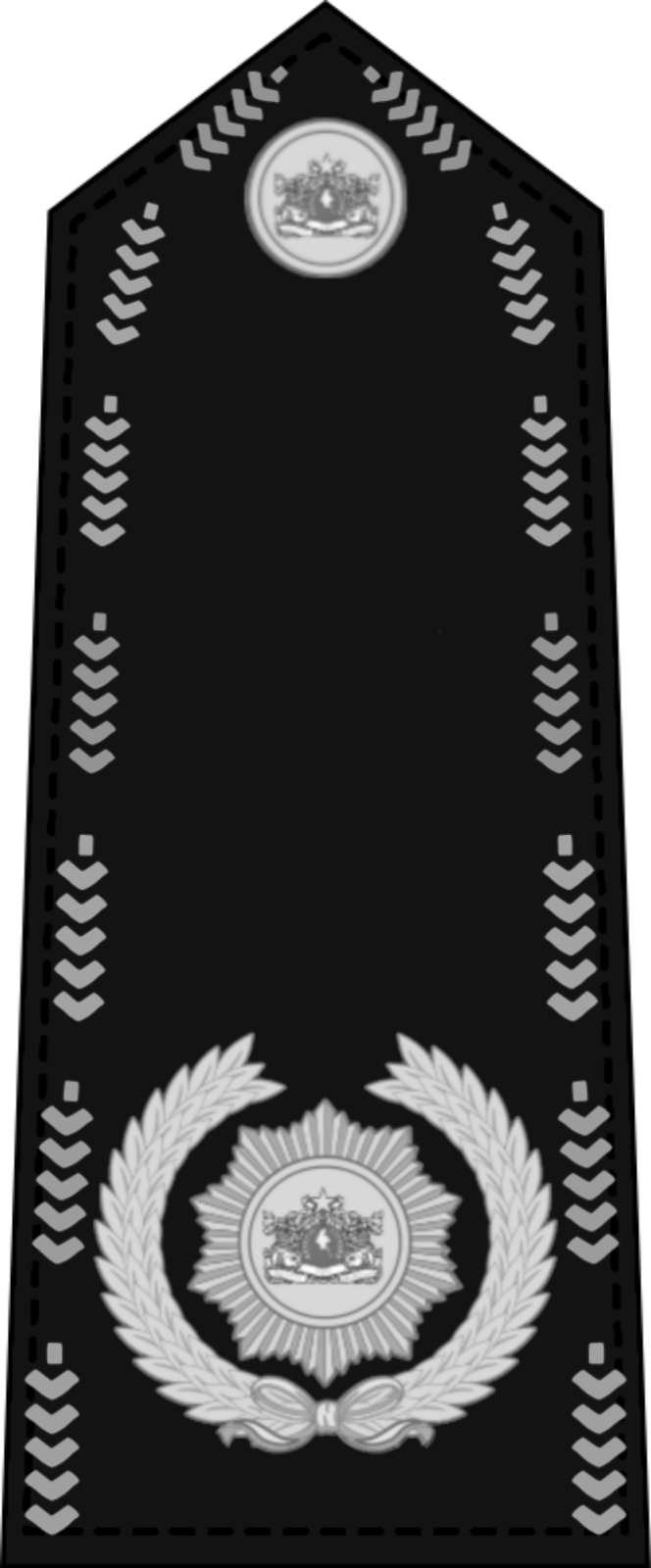
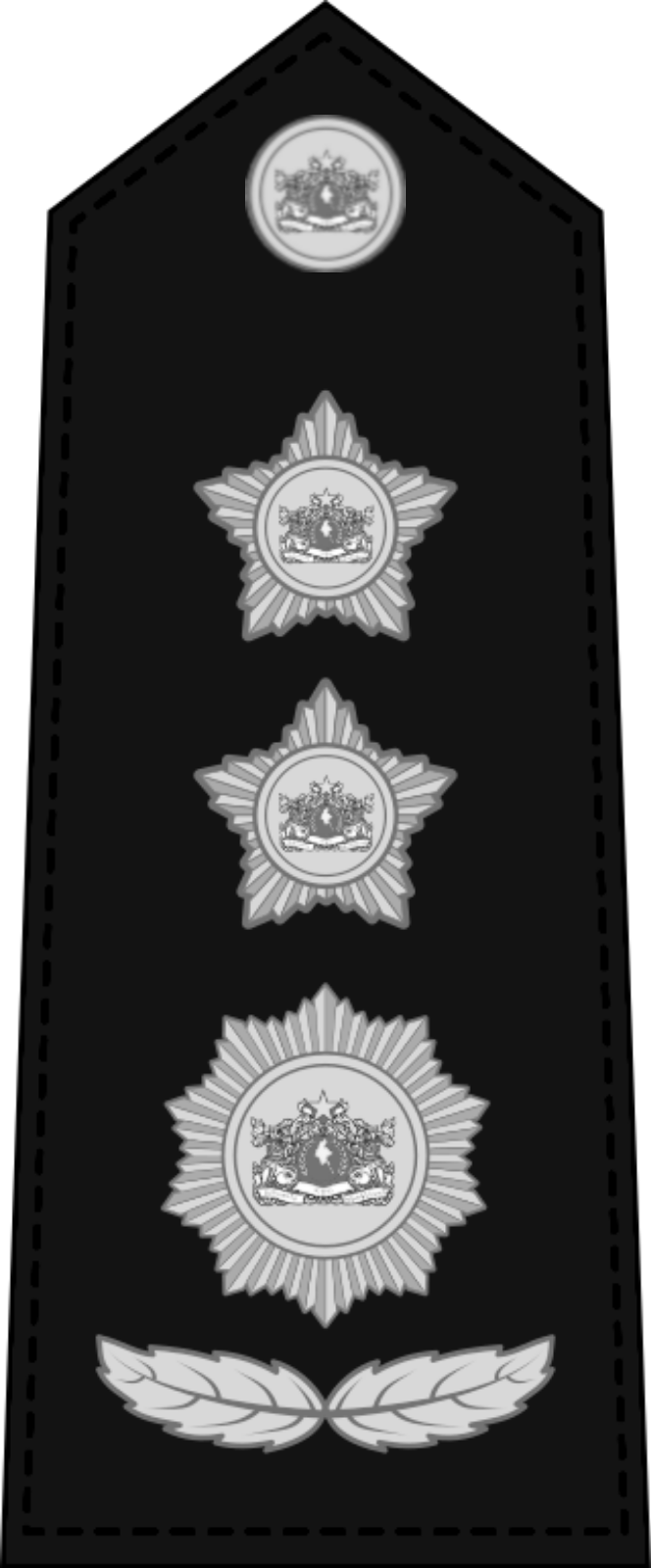
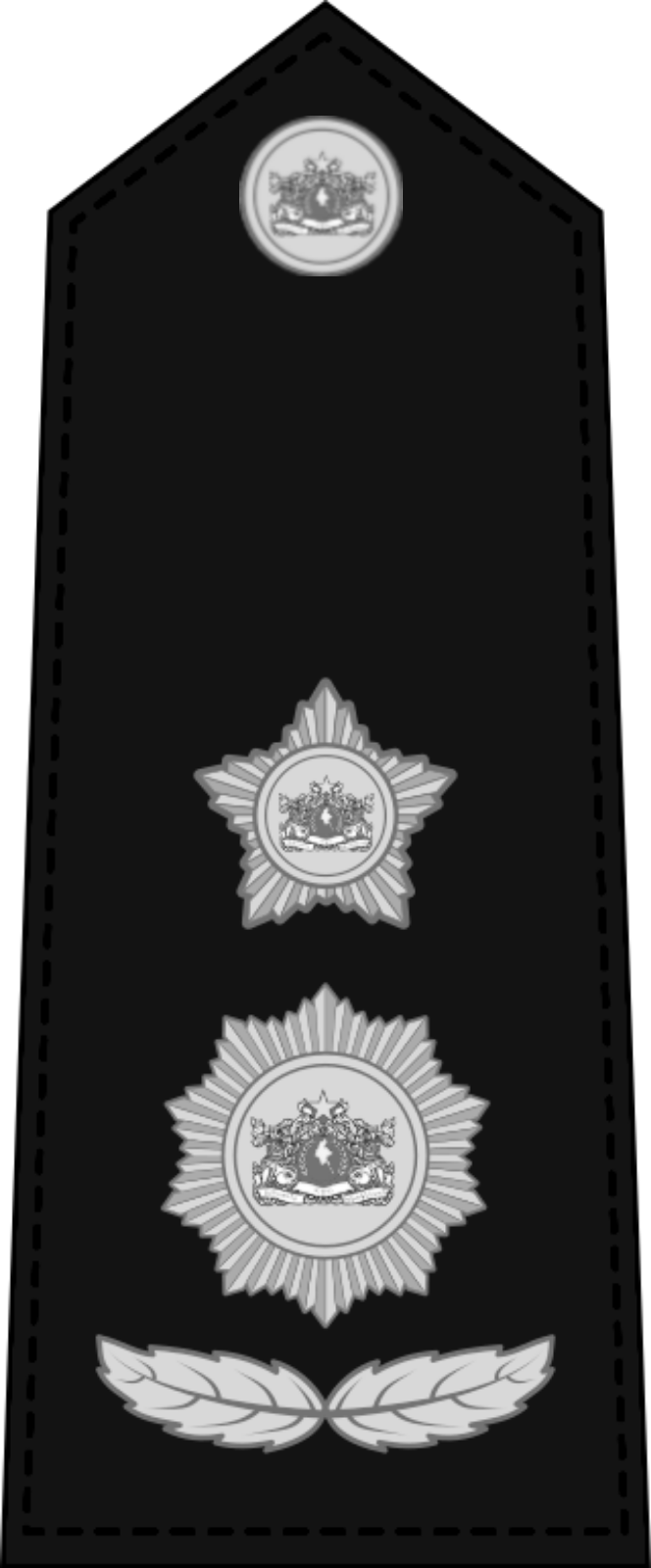
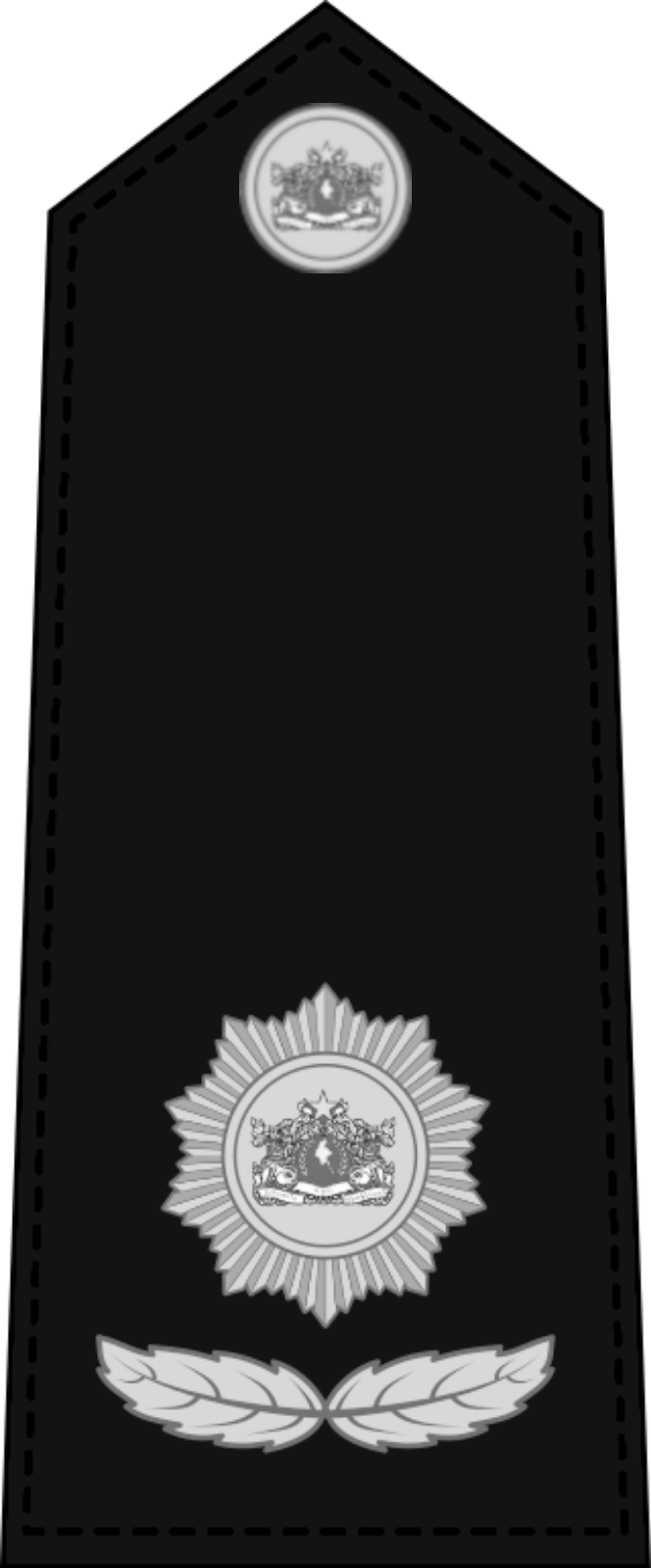
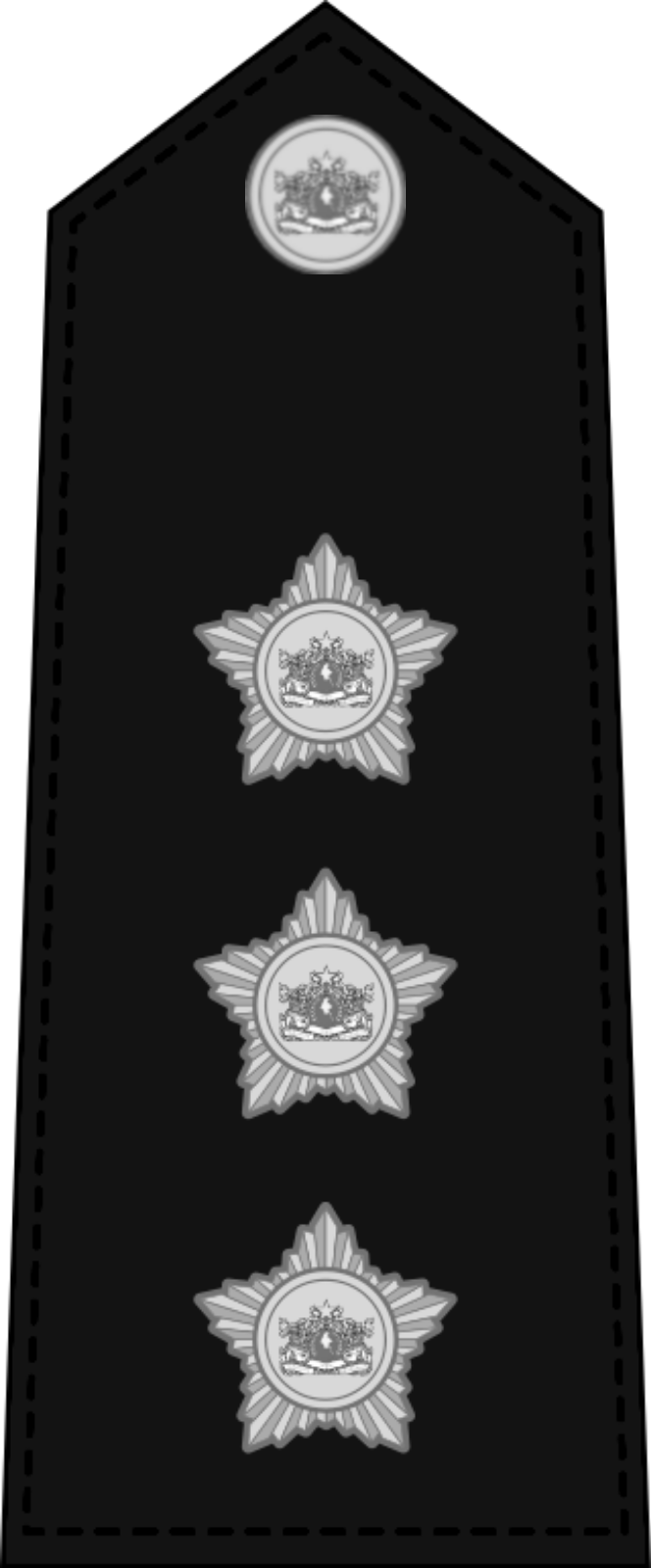
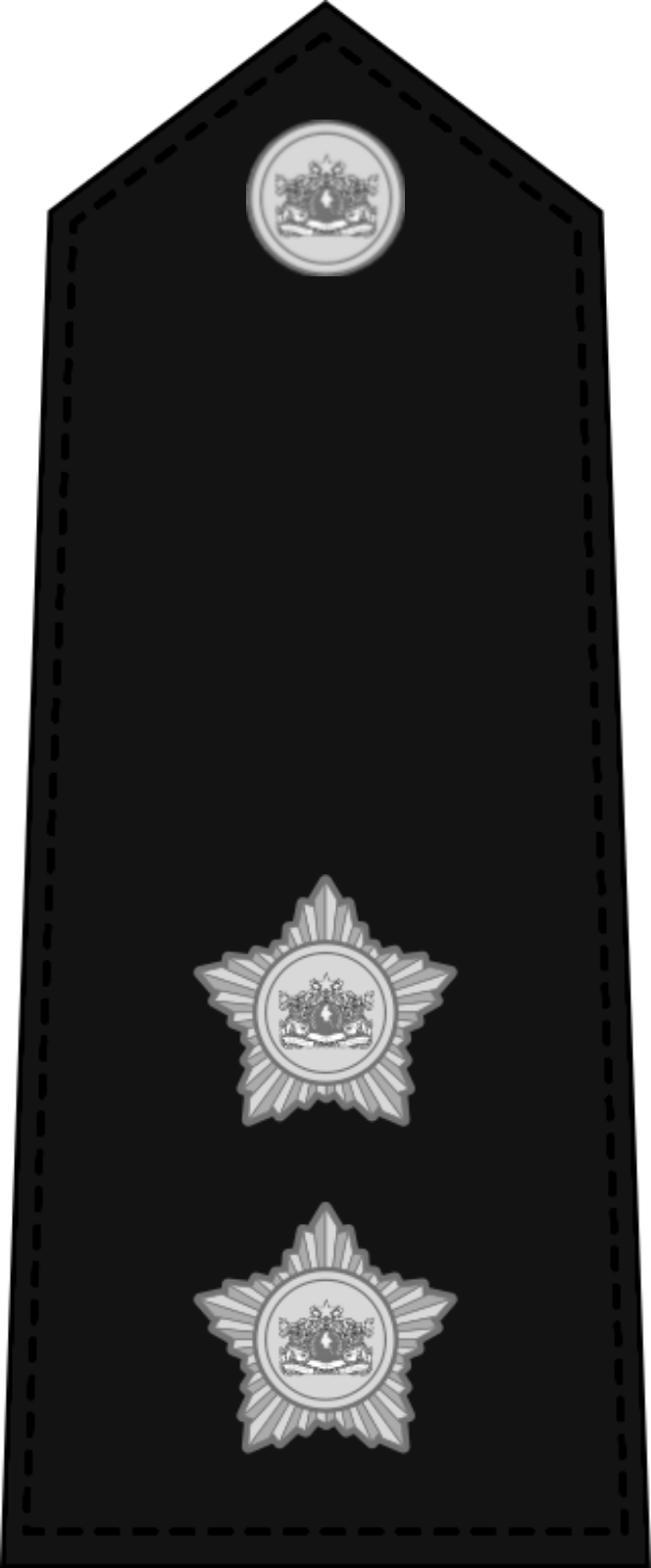
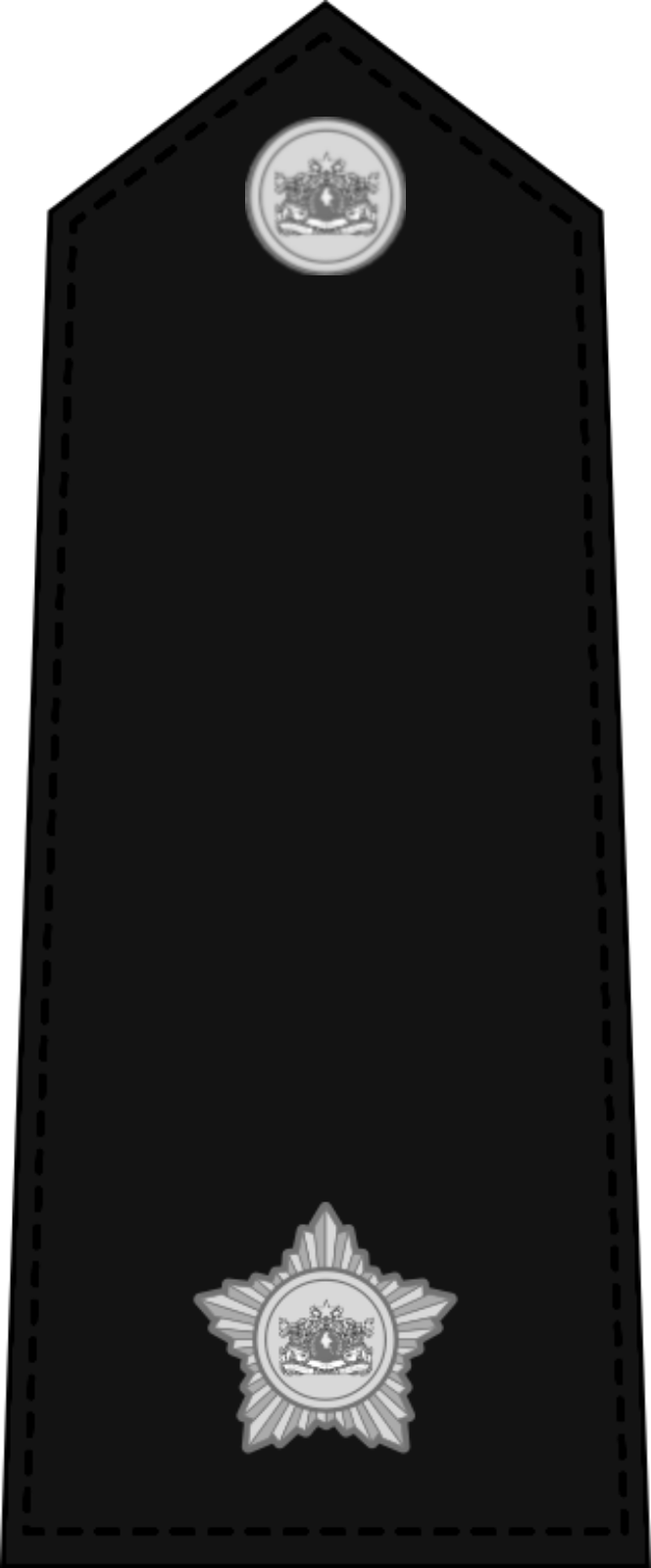
Rank group	General / flag officers				Senior officers			Junior officers
Burmese	ညွှန်ကြားရေးမှူးချုပ်	ဒုတိယညွှန်ကြားရေးမှူးချုပ်	ညွှန်ကြားရေးမှူး	ဒုတိယညွှန်ကြားရေးမှူး	လက်ထောက်ညွှန်ကြားရေးမှူး	ဦးစီးအရာရှိ (ပထမတန်း)	ဦးစီးအရာရှိ (ဒုတိယတန်း)	ဦးစီးအရာရှိ (တတိယတန်း)	ထောင်မှူးကြီး/ ဒုတိယကြီးကြပ်ရေးမှူး	ထောင်မှူး/ လက်ထောက်ကြီးကြပ်ရေးမှူး
ALA-LC
Full insignia
Translation	Director general	Deputy director general	Director	Deputy director	Assistant director	Staff officer (first class)	Staff officer (second class)	Staff officer (third class)	Chief jailor/ Deputy supervisor	Jailor/ Assistant supervisor

=== Other ranks ===
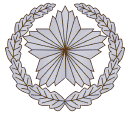
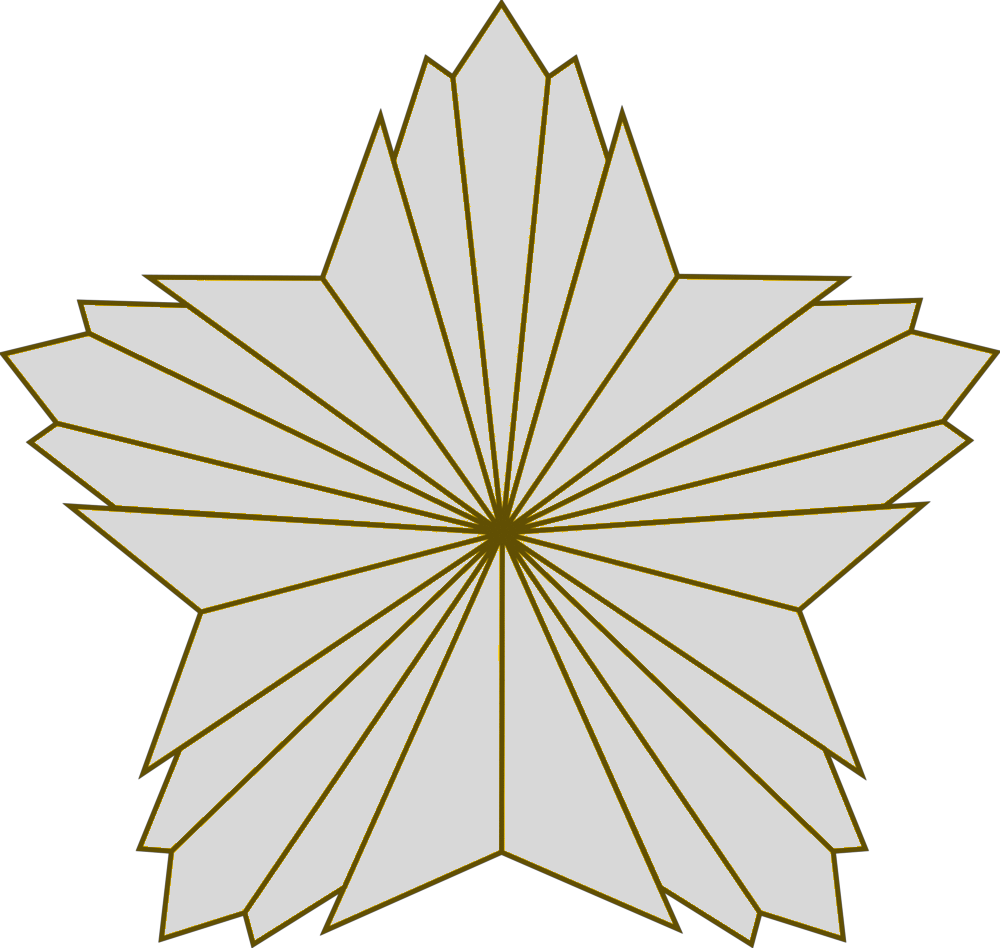
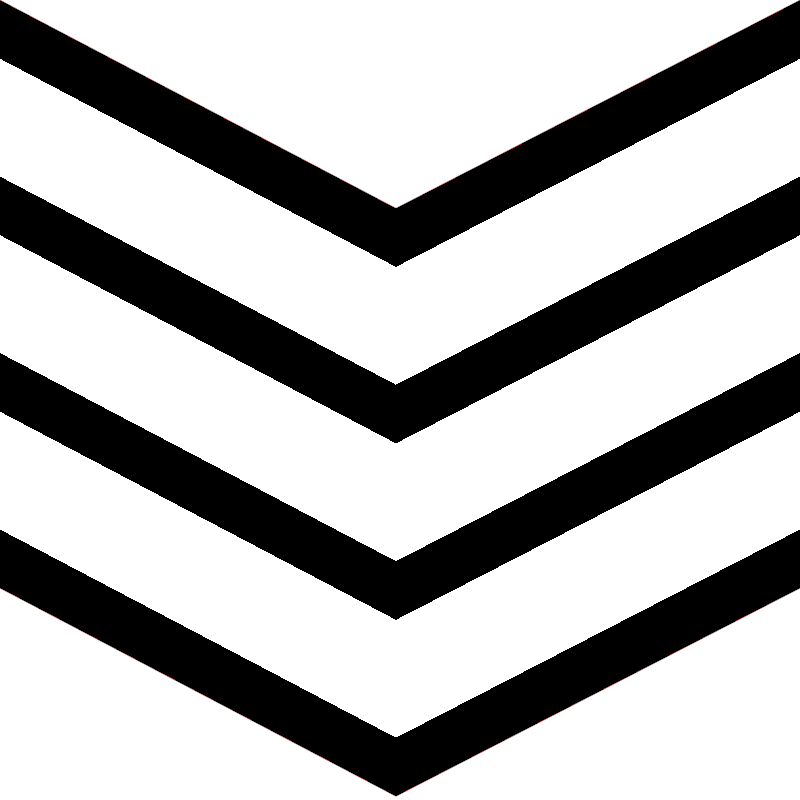
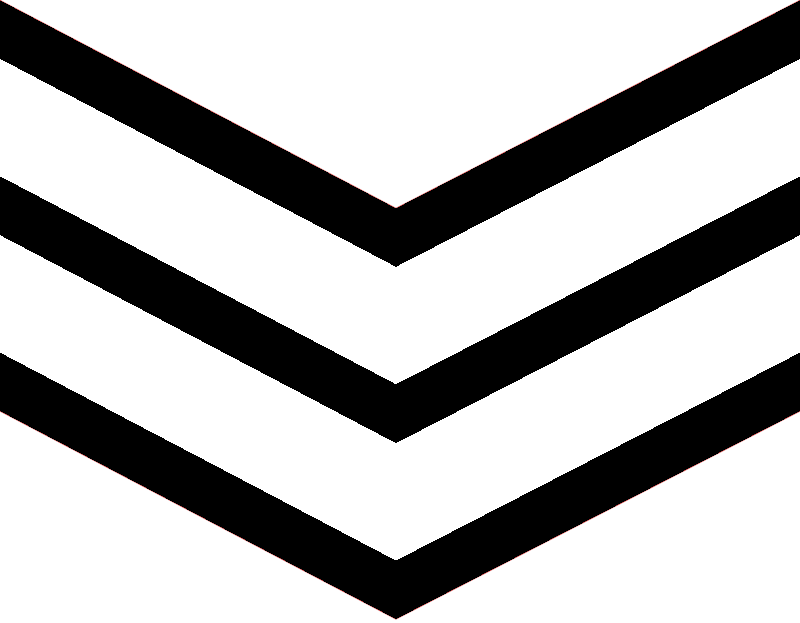
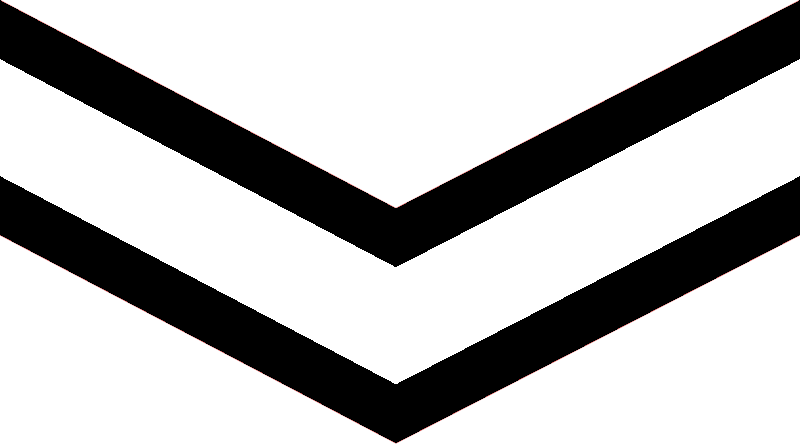
Rank group	Insignia-wearing staffs					Enlisted staffs
Burmese	လက်ထောက်ထောင်မှူး(၂)/ လက်ထောက်ကြီးကြပ်ရေးမှူး	လက်ထောက်ထောင်မှူး(၁)/ ဒုတိယလက်ထောက်ကြီးကြပ်ရေးမှူး	အကျဉ်းထောင်တပ်ကြပ်ကြီး	အကျဉ်းထောင်တပ်ကြပ်	အကျဉ်းထောင်ဒုတိယတပ်ကြပ်	အကျဉ်းထောင်တပ်သား	အကျဉ်းထောင်တပ်သားသစ်
ALA-LC
						No insignia	No insignia
Translation	Assistant jailor (2)/ Assistant supervisor	Assistant jailor (1)/ Deputy assistant supervisor	Prison sergeant	Prison corporal	Prison lance corporal	Prison private	Prison recruit

== General Administration Department ==
General Administration Department is a department of the Ministry of Home Affairs, one of the ministries under administration of Commander-in-Chief of Defence Services. As its uniform is not the military style, pin badges are used to show ranks.

=== Officers ===
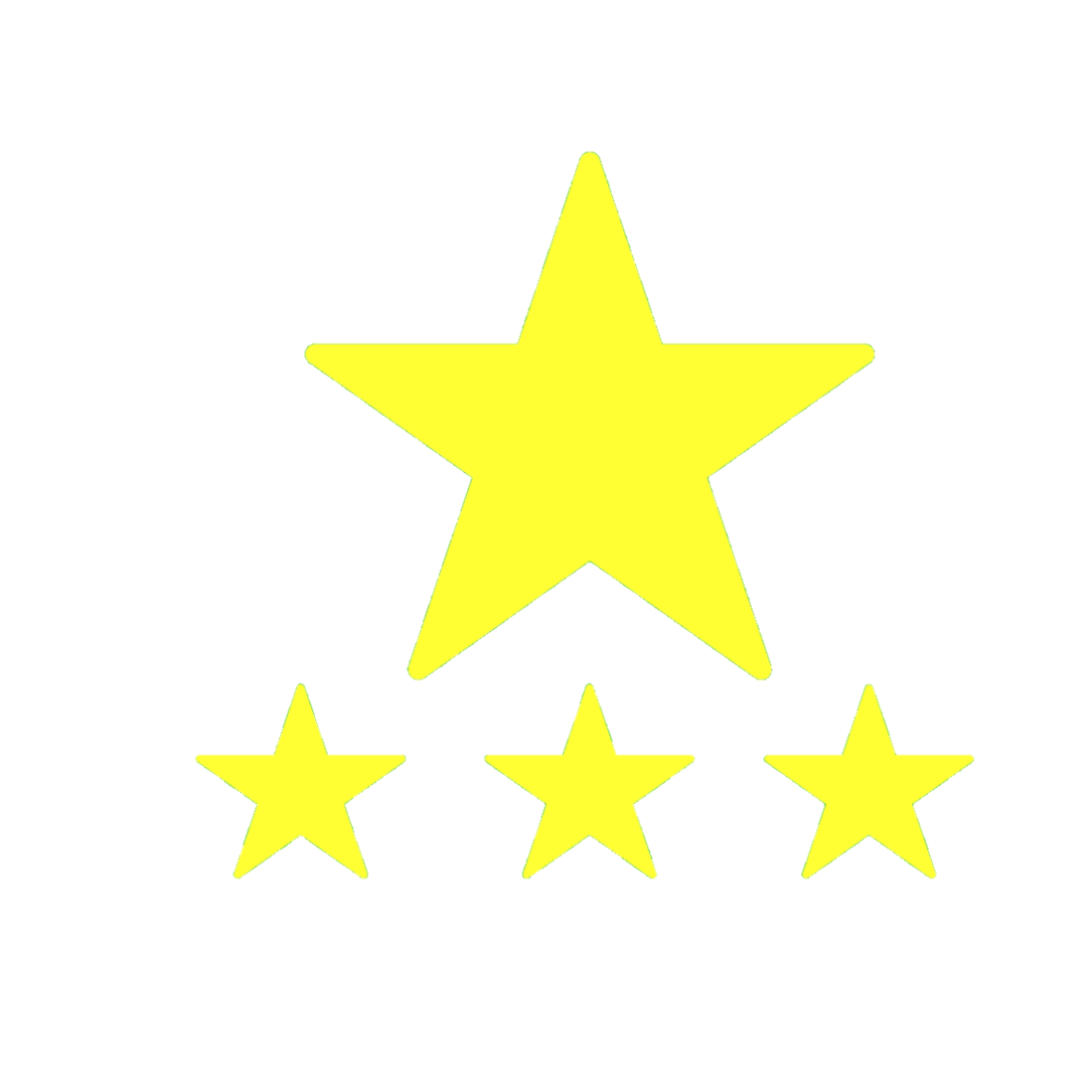
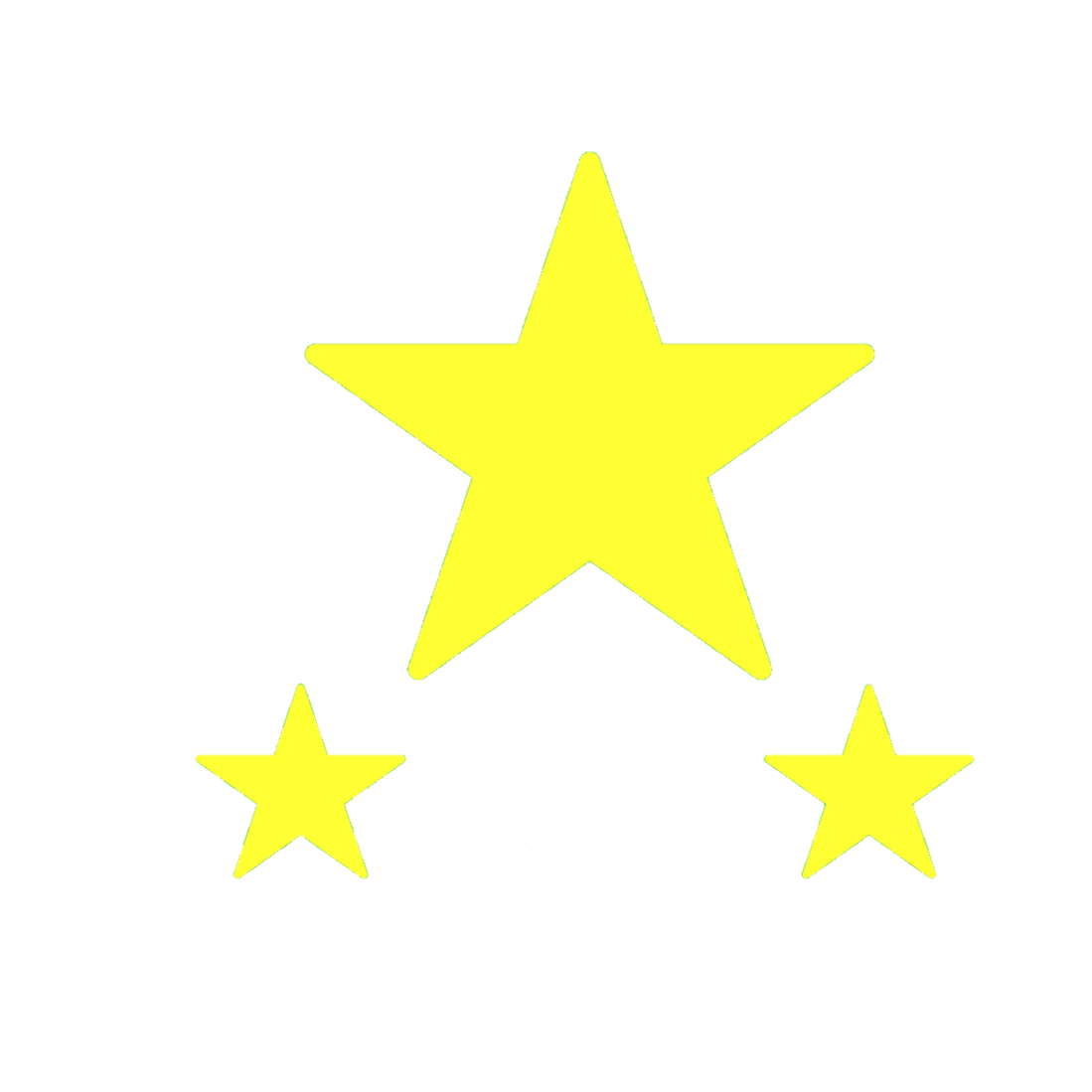
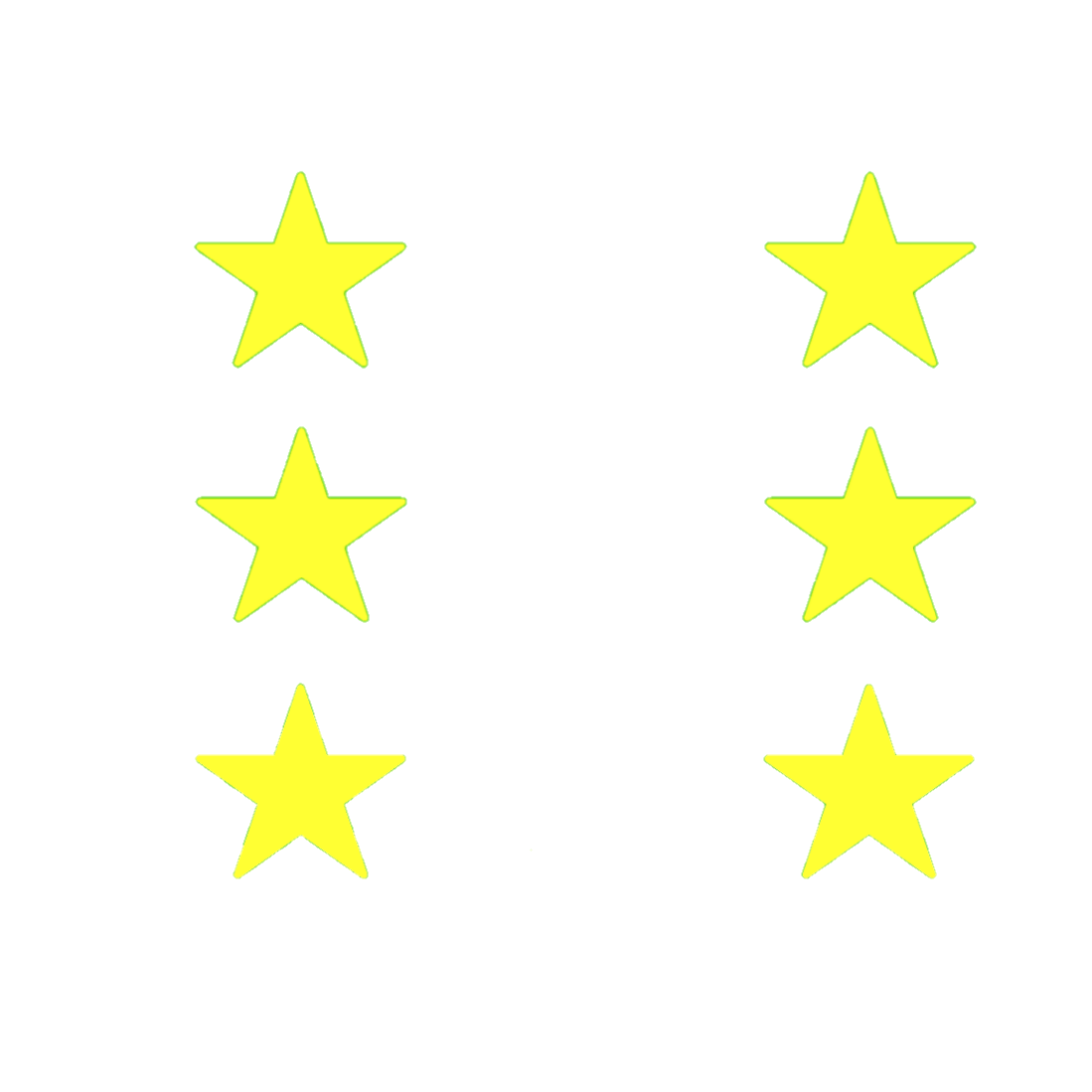
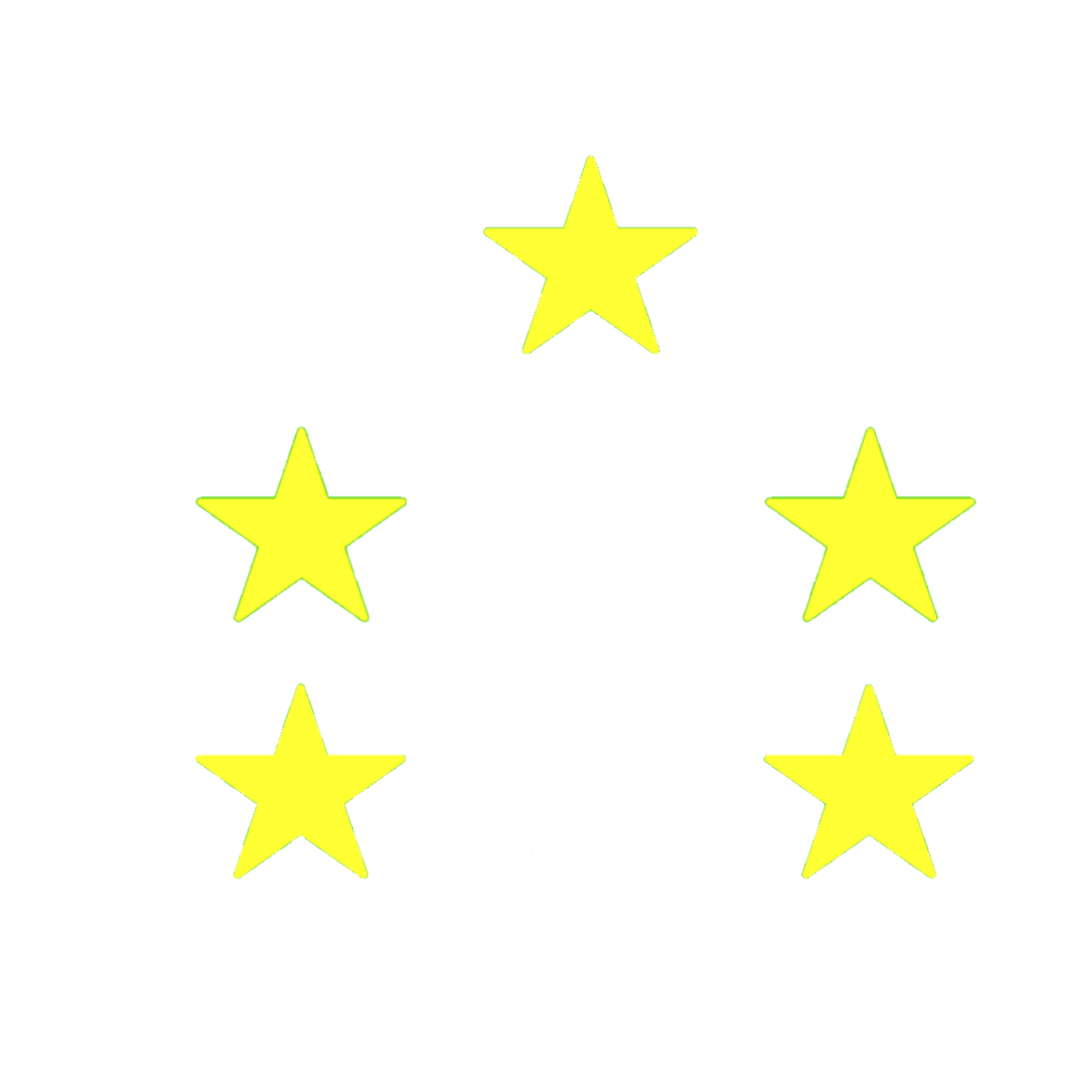
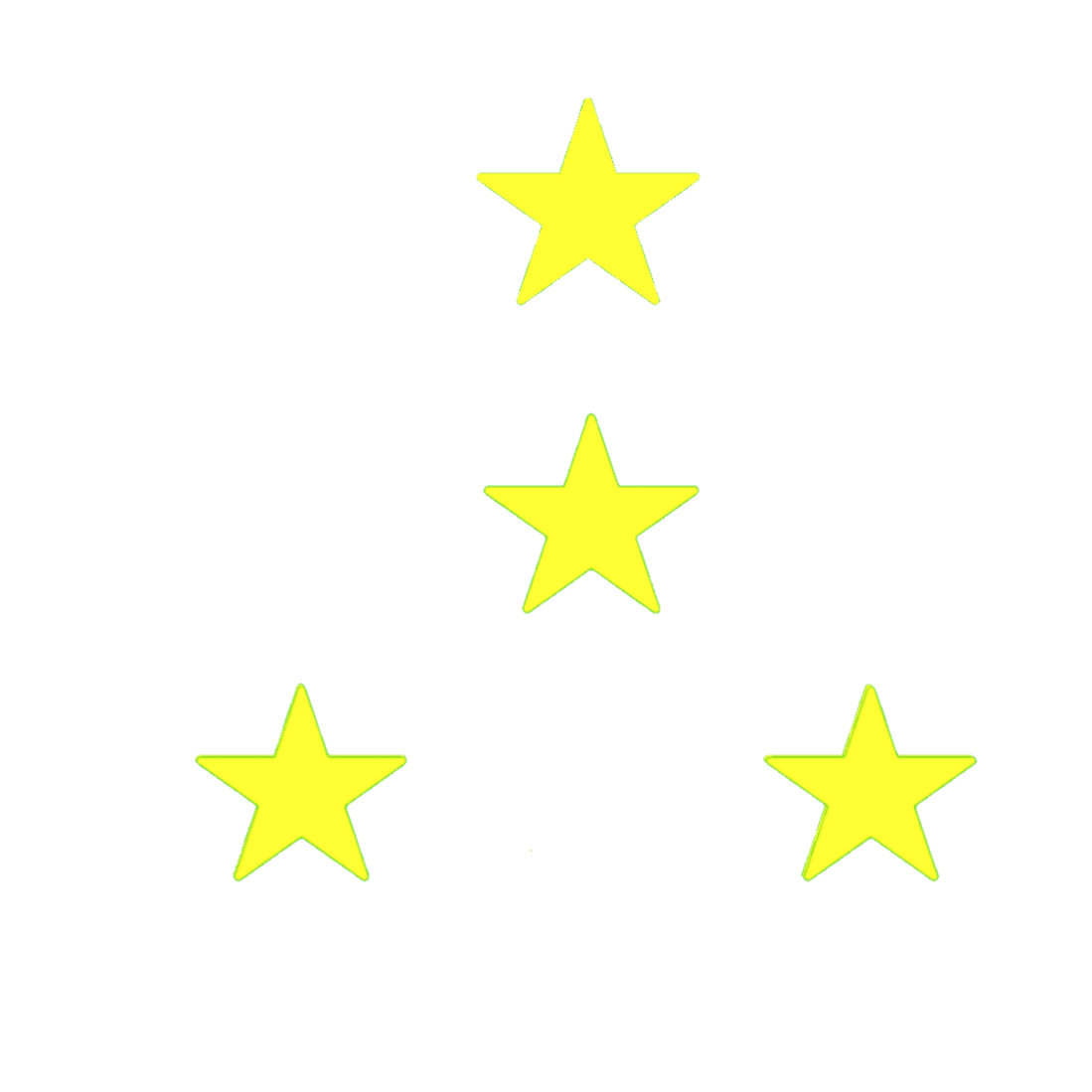
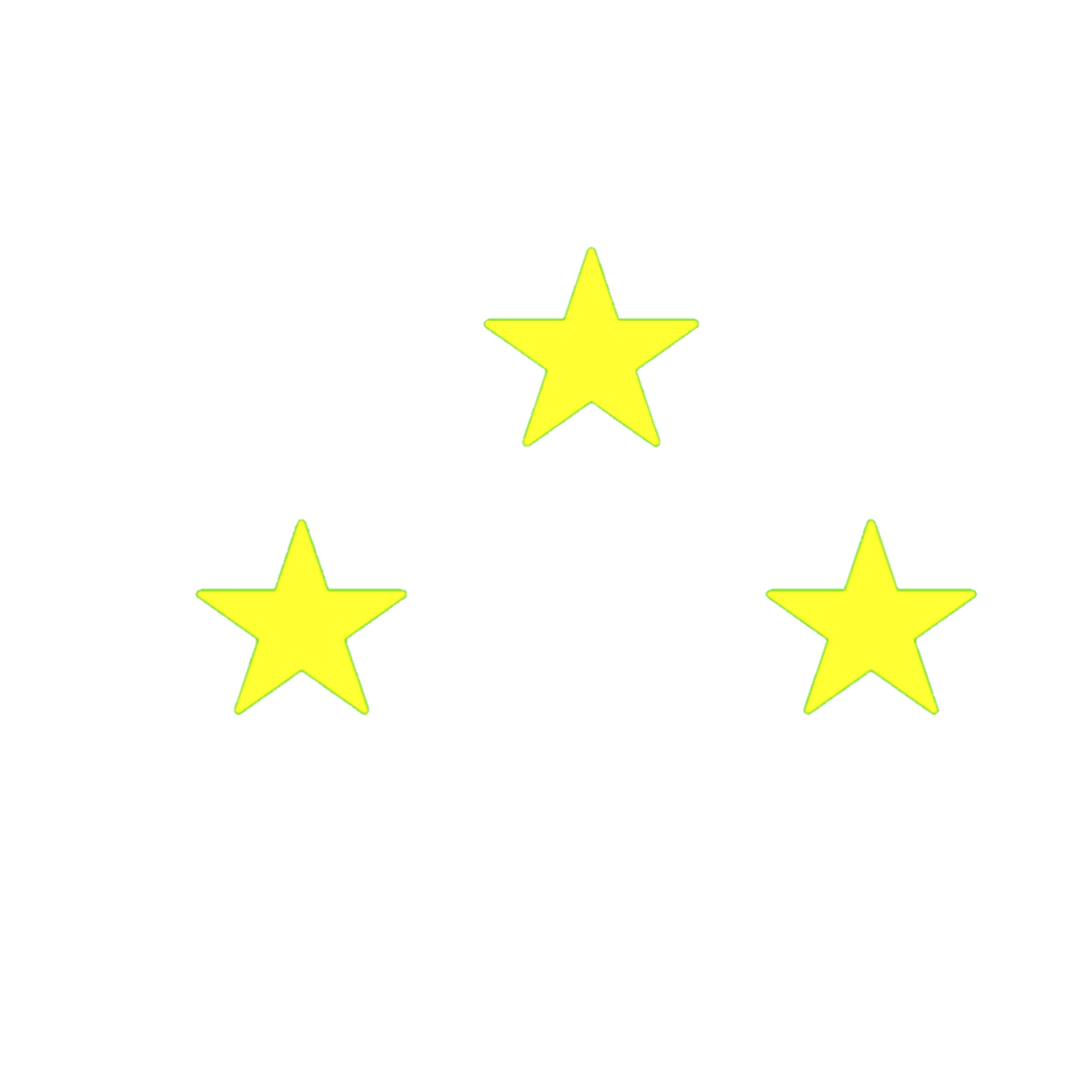
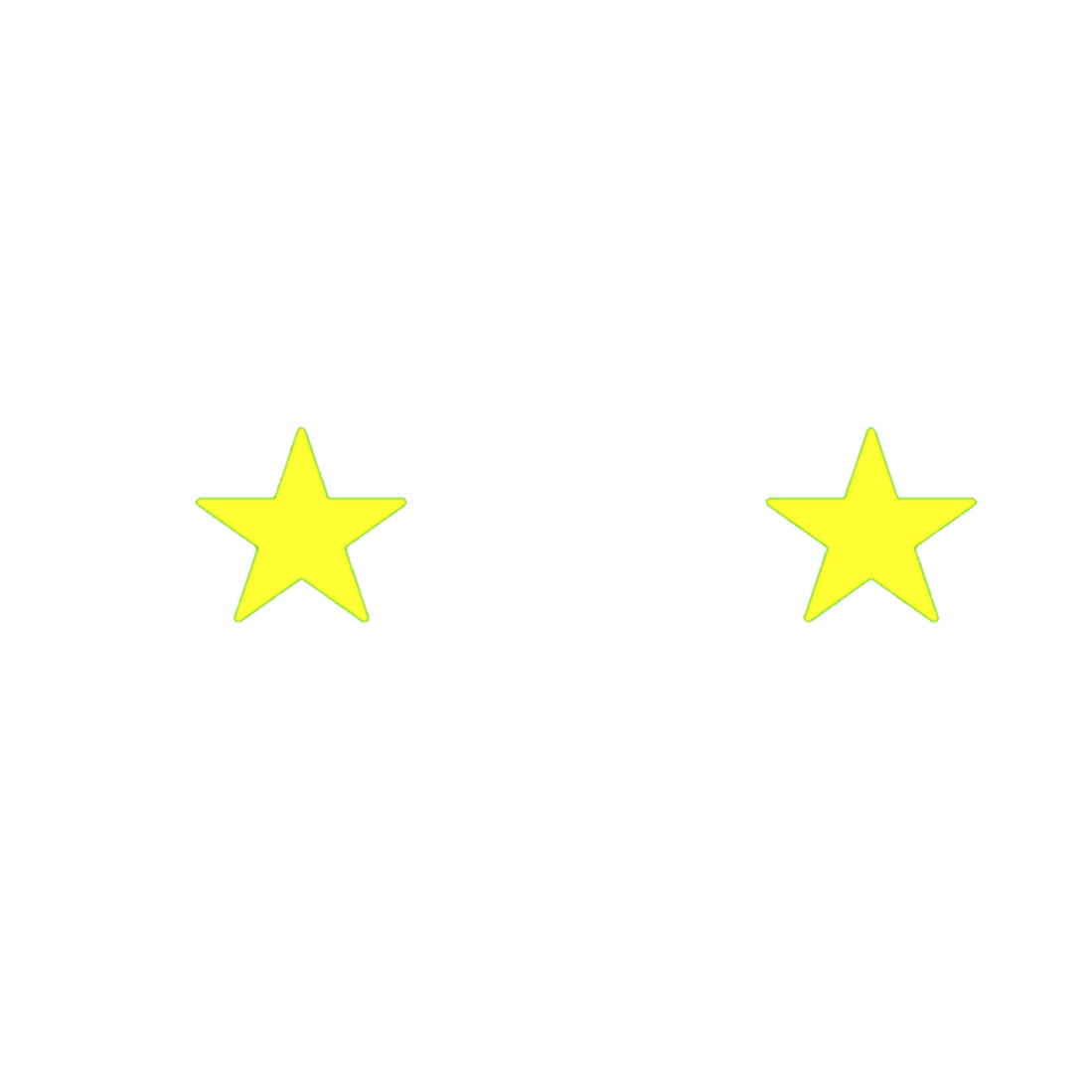
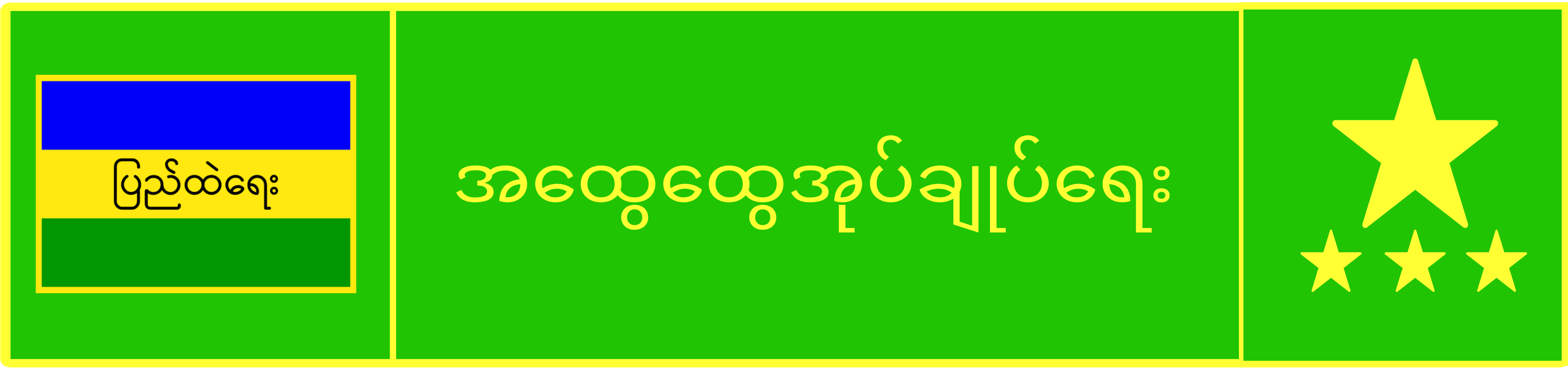
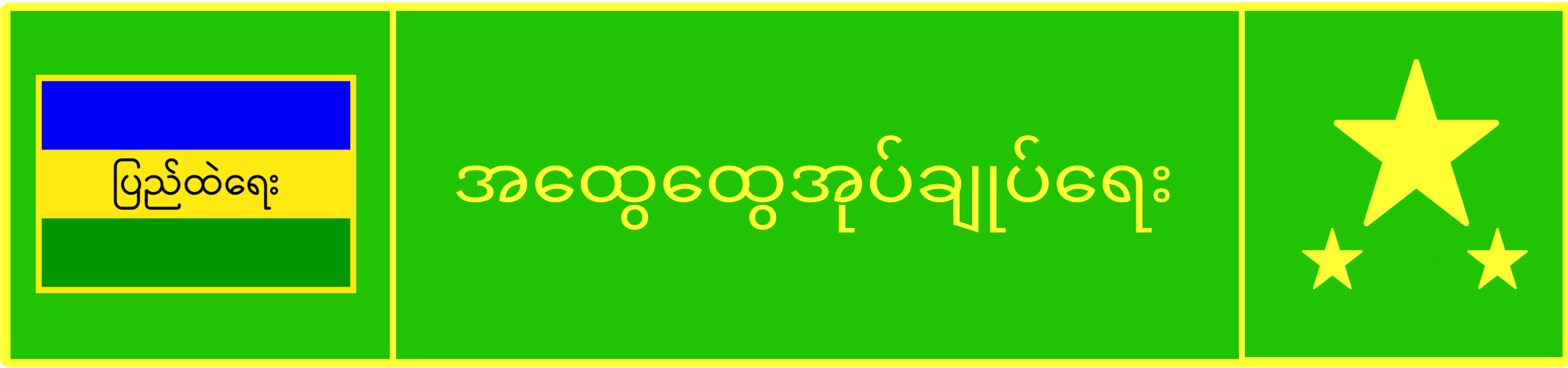
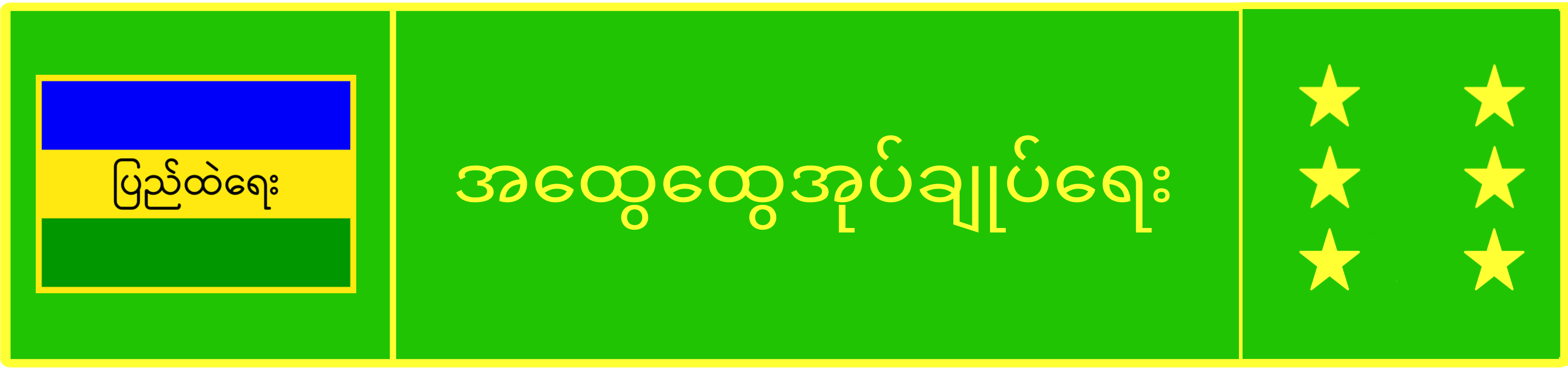
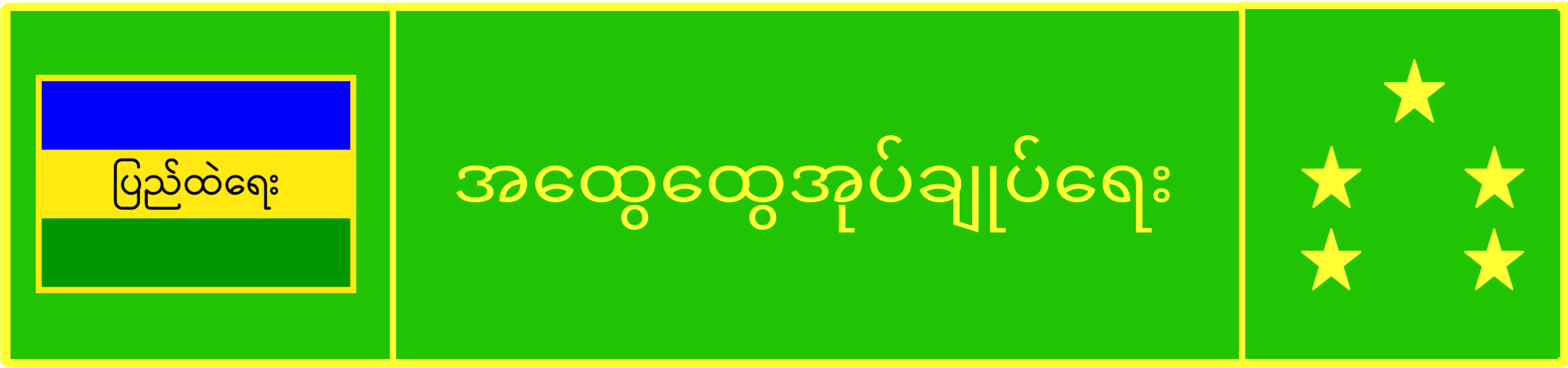
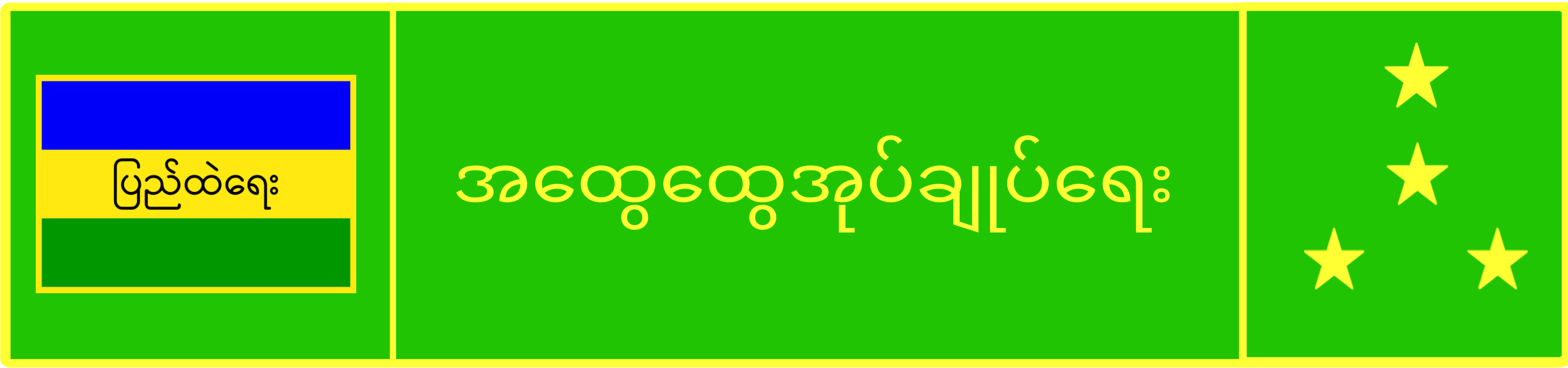
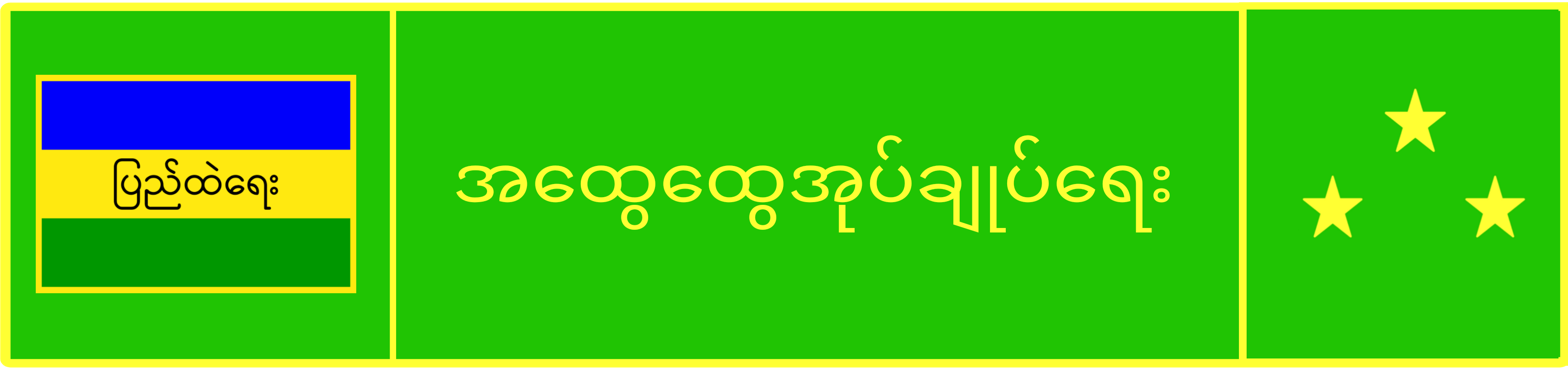
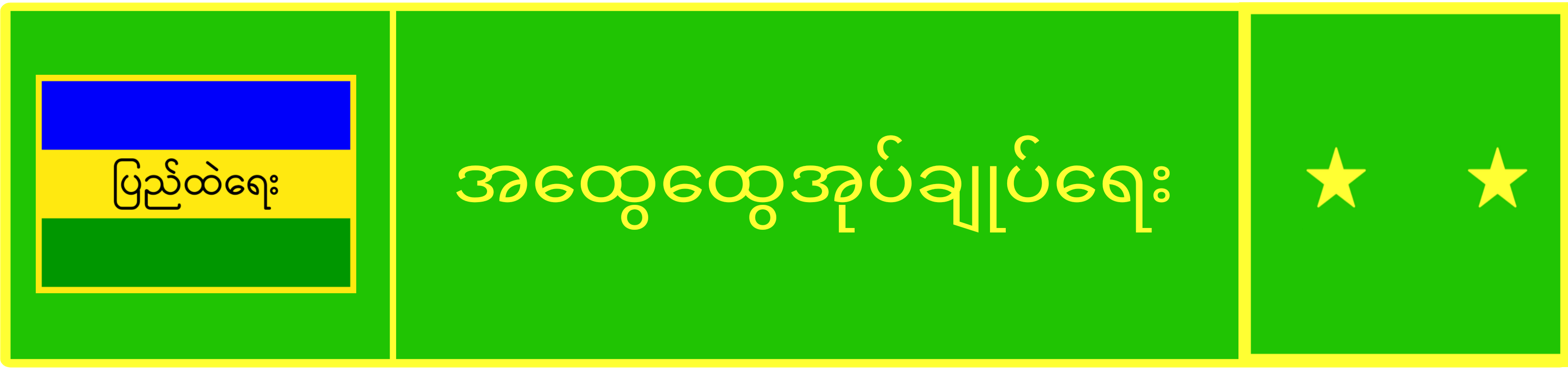
Rank group
Burmese	ညွှန်ကြားရေးမှူးချုပ်/ အမြဲတမ်းအတွင်းဝန်	ဒုတိယညွှန်ကြားရေးမှူးချုပ်/ တိုင်းအုပ်ချုပ်ရေးမှူး	ညွှန်ကြားရေးမှူး/ ခရိုင်အုပ်ချုပ်ရေးမှူး	ဒုတိယညွှန်ကြားရေးမှူး/ ဒုတိယခရိုင်အုပ်ချုပ်ရေးမှူး	လက်ထောက်ညွှန်ကြားရေးမှူး/ မြို့နယ်အုပ်ချုပ်ရေးမှူး	ဦးစီးအရာရှိ/ ဒုတိယမြို့နယ်အုပ်ချုပ်ရေးမှူး	ဒုတိယဦးစီးမှူး/ စီမံ ၁
ALA-LC
Rank symbol
Pin badge
Translation	Director general/ Permanent secretary	Deputy director general/ Divisional administrator	Director/ District administrator	Deputy director/ Deputy district administrator	Assistant director/ Township administrator	Staff officer/ Deputy township administrator	Deputy chief officer/ Manager (1)

=== Staffs ===
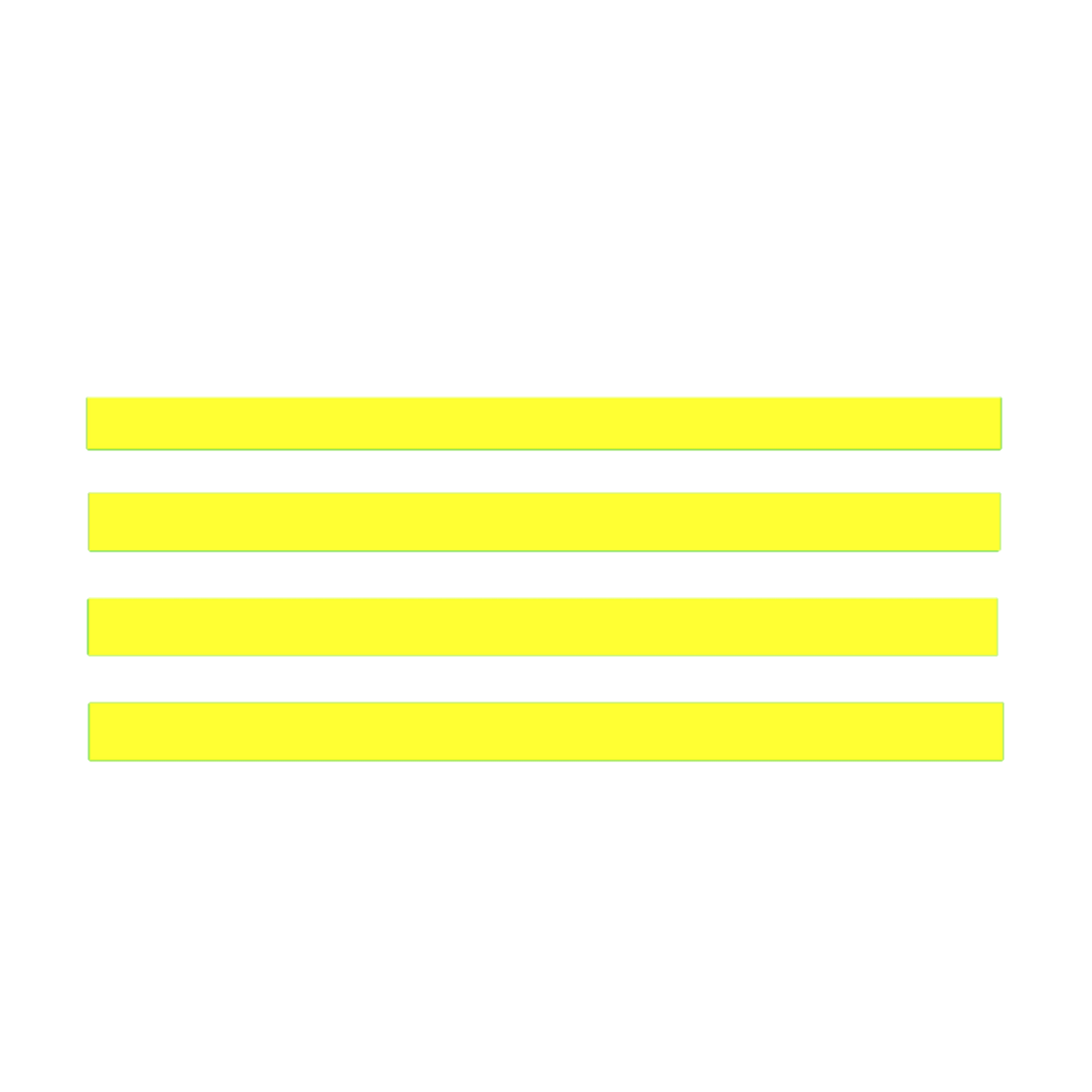
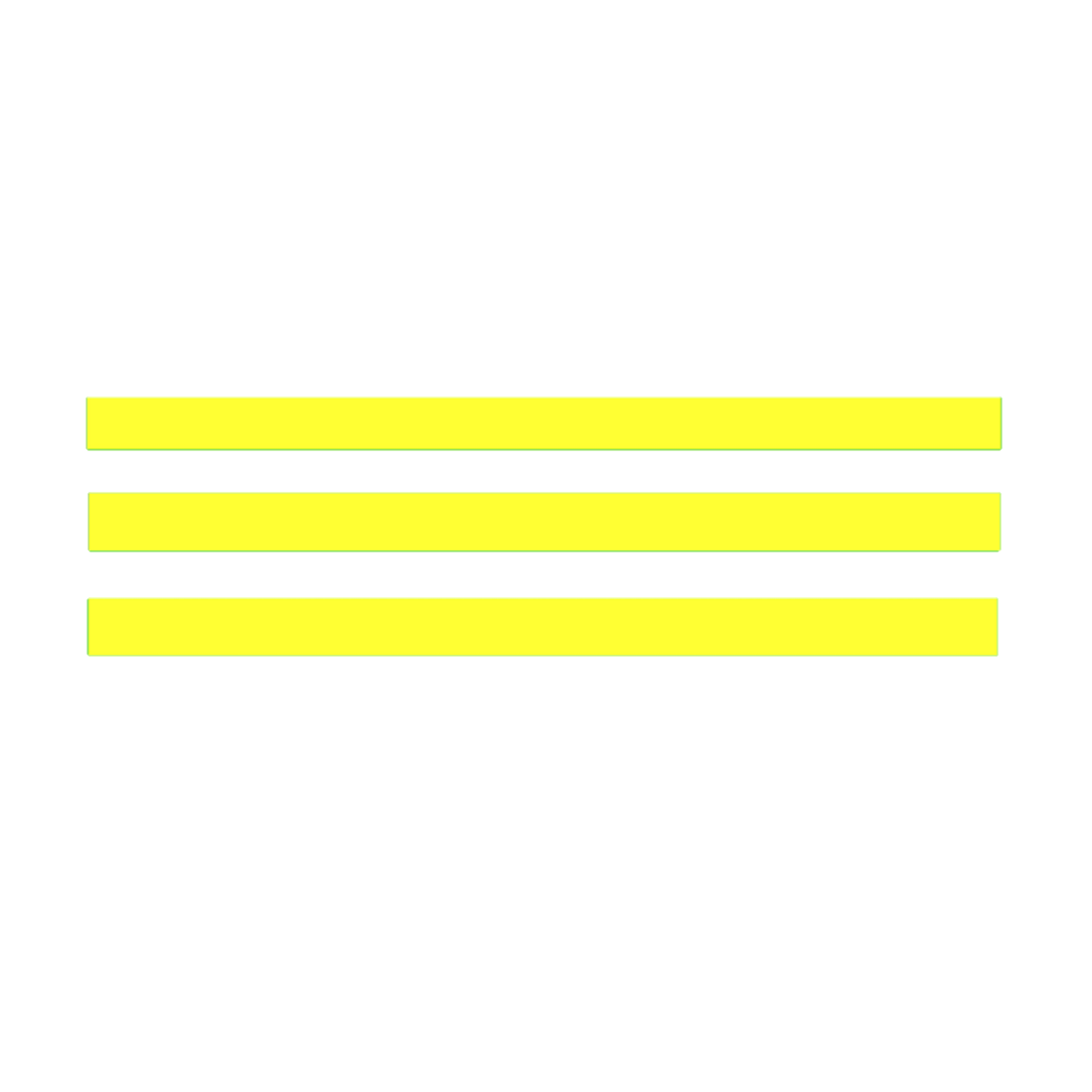
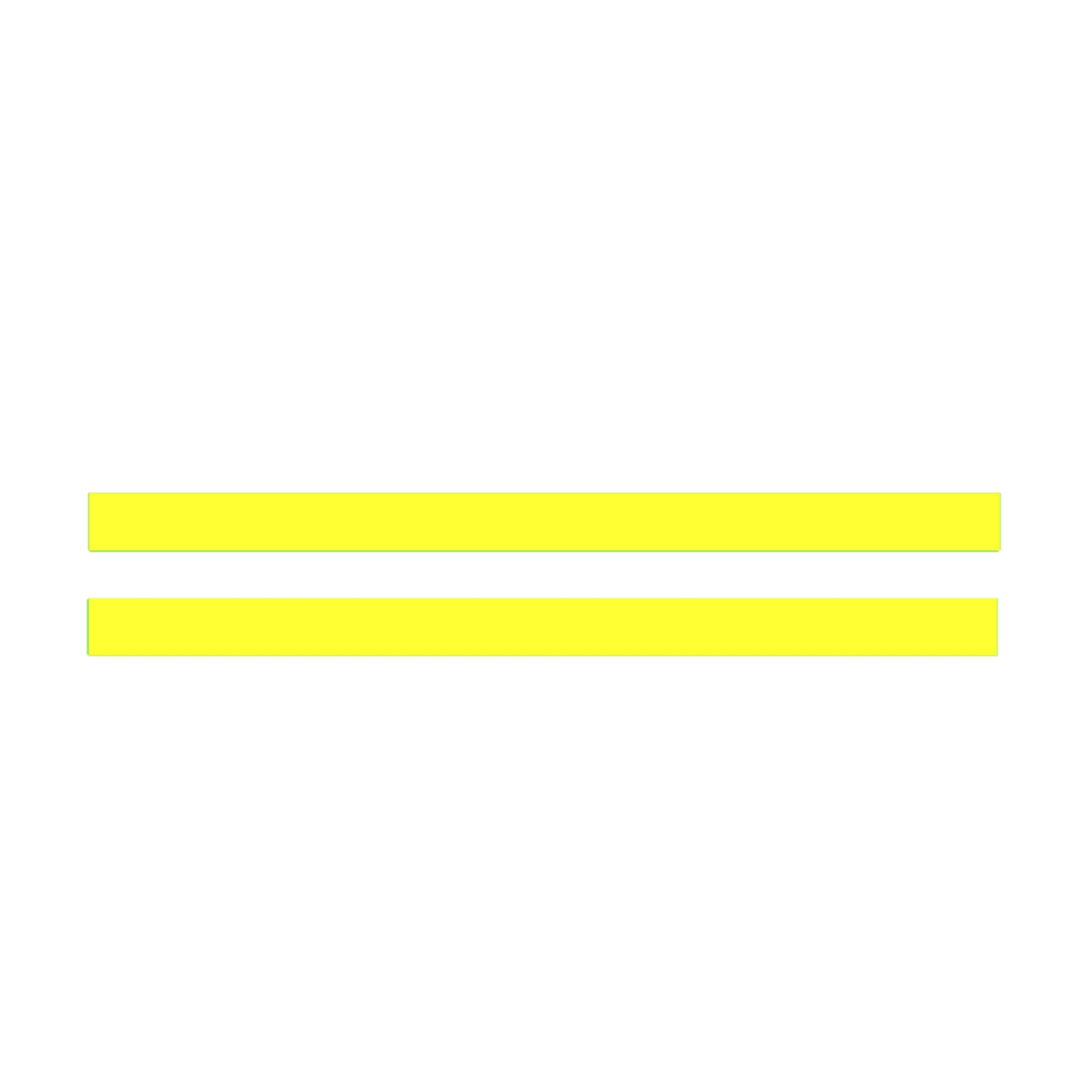
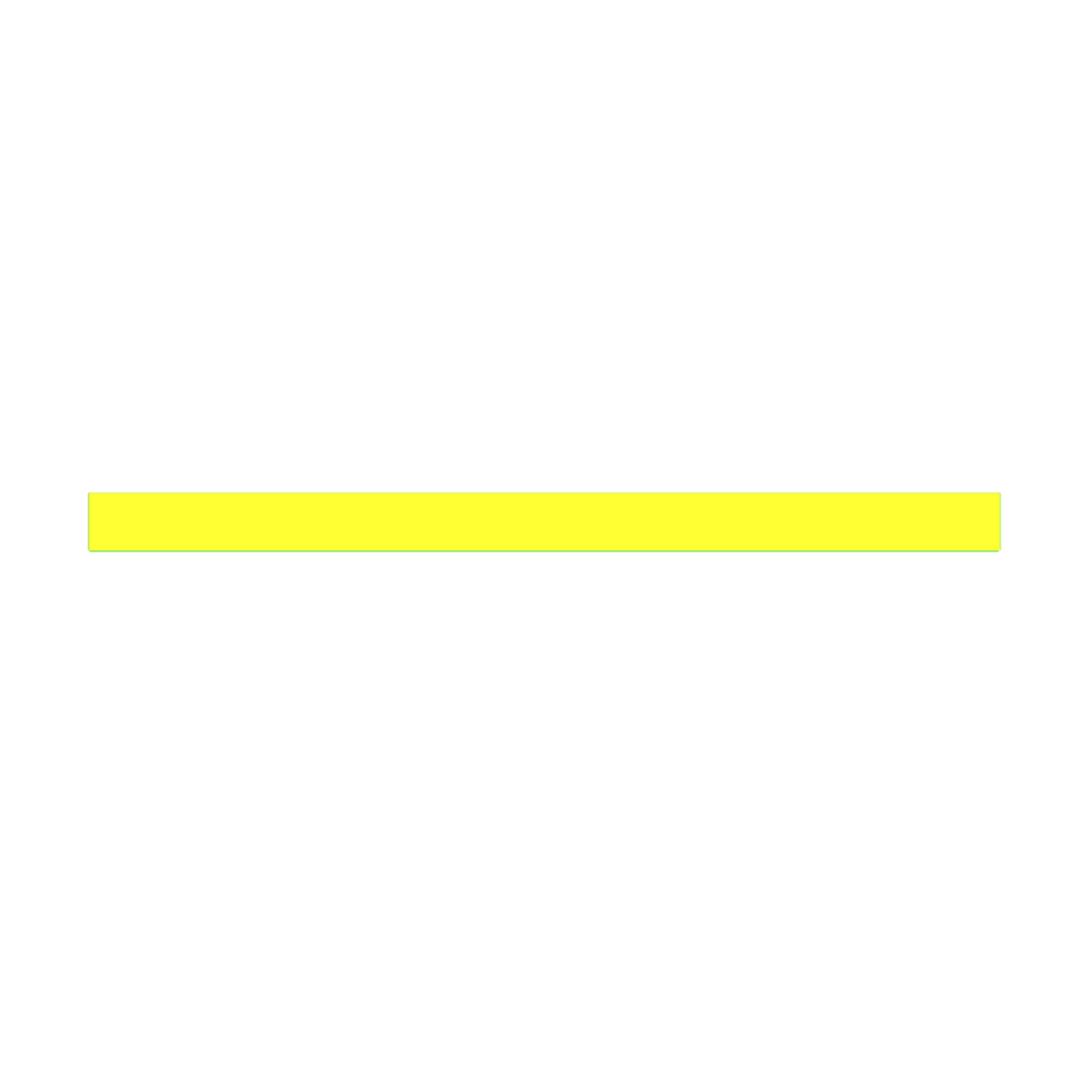
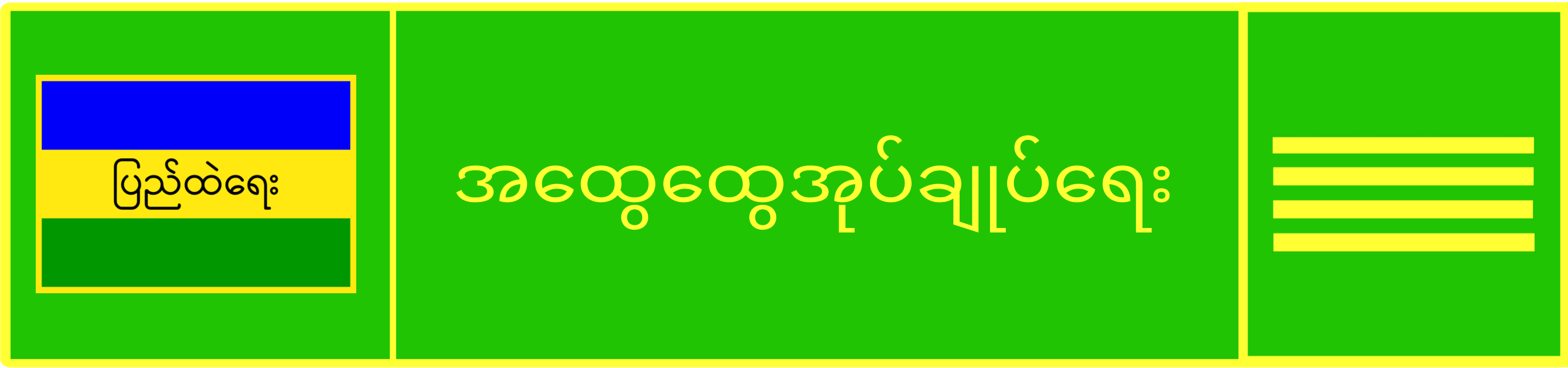
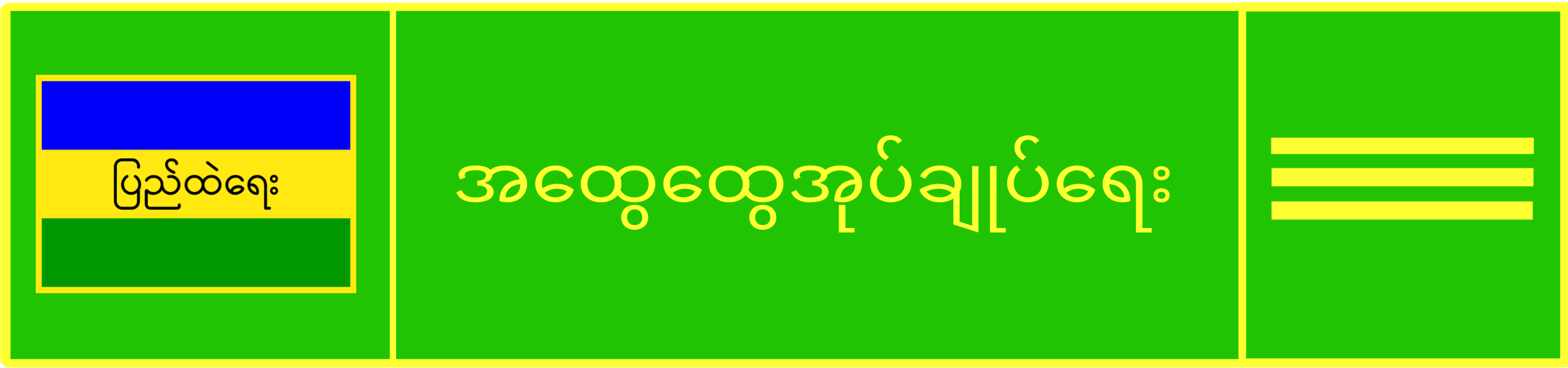
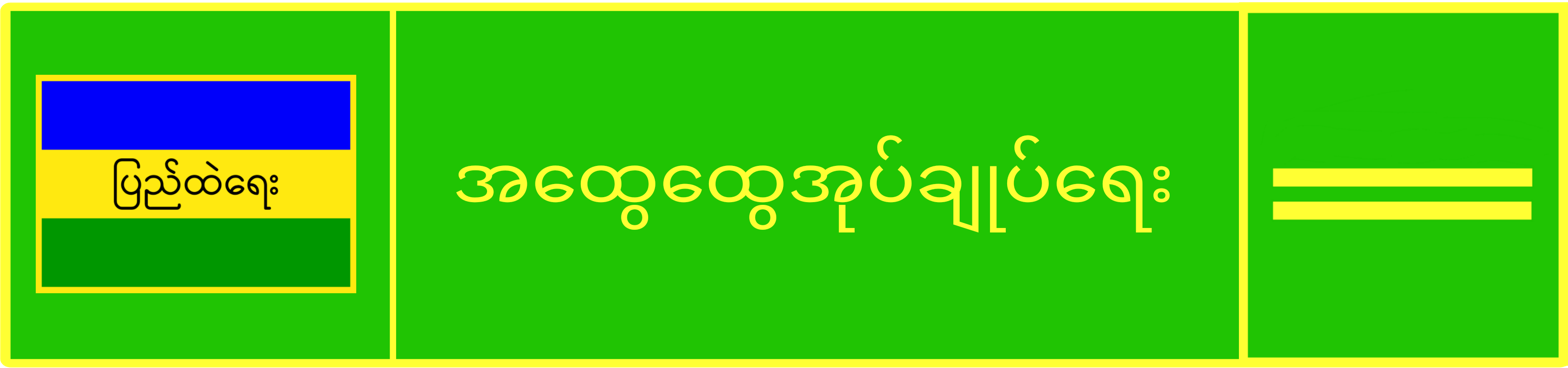
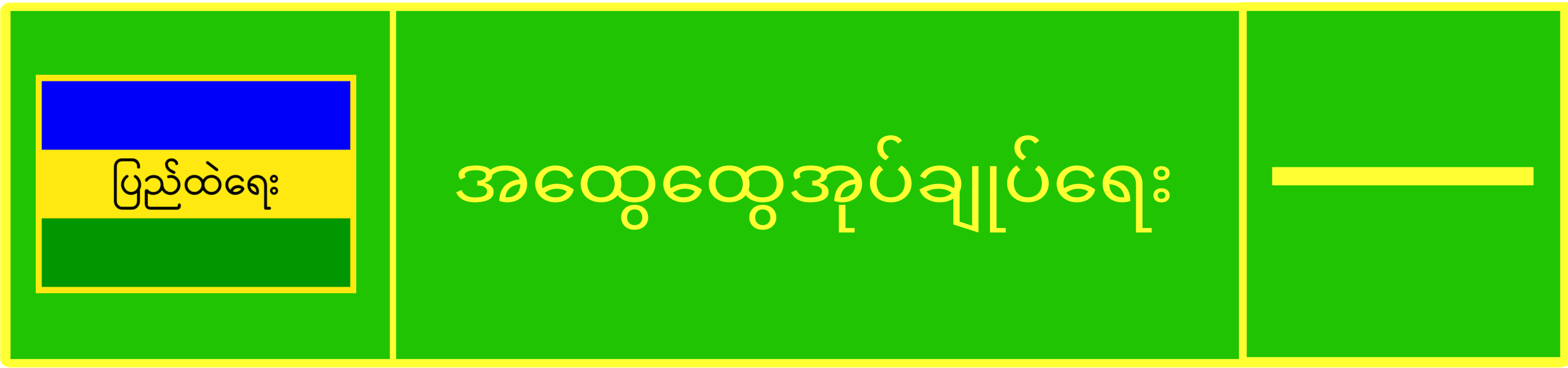
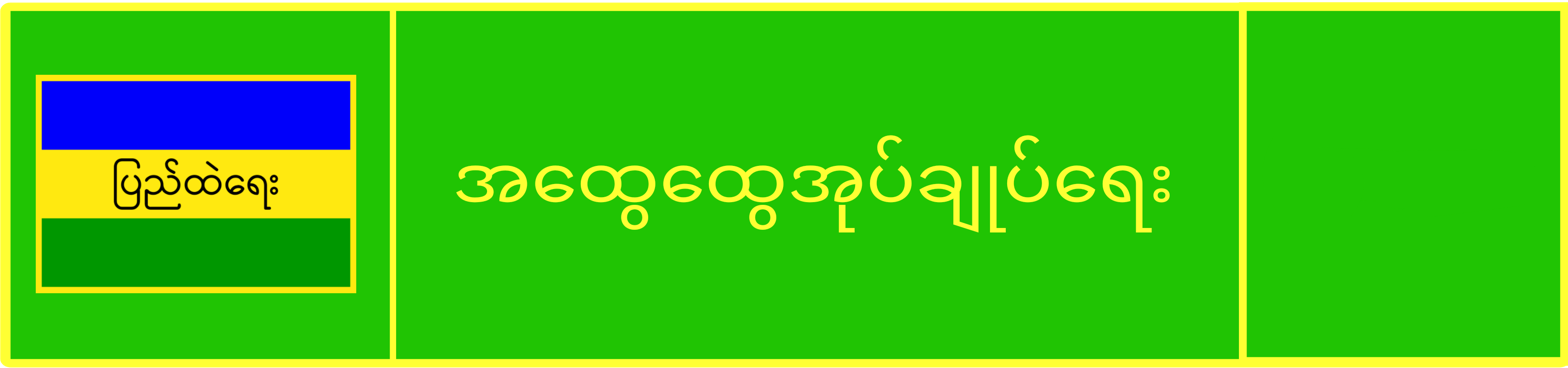
Rank group	Staffs
Burmese	ရုံးအုပ်	ဌာနခွဲစာရေး	အကြီးတန်းစာရေး	အငယ်တန်းစာရေး	ရုံးအကူ/ စာပို့/ ယာဉ်မောင်း
ALA-LC
Rank symbol
Pin badge
Translation	Superintendent	Branch clerk	Upper divisional clerk	Lower divisional clerk	Office factotum/ Mailman/ Driver
