= Four-star rank (Myanmar) =

Military rank in Myanmar

In the Tatmadaw (the armed forces of Myanmar) there are two different ranks, one higher than another, but both designated as four-star ranks.

- Vice-senior General (Burmese: ဒုတိယဗိုလ်ချုပ်မှူးကြီး): a rank between five-star rank of Senior general and four-star rank of General/Admiral, but designated as a four-star rank.
- General or Admiral (Burmese: ဗိုလ်ချုပ်ကြီး): the actual four-star rank.

Seniority in Armed Forces	Burmese title	English title		Rank insignia	Golden strap	Rank medal	Car insignia
Seniority in Armed Forces	Burmese title	for Army and Air Force	for Navy	Rank insignia	Golden strap	Rank medal	Car insignia
2.	ဒုတိယဗိုလ်ချုပ်မှူးကြီး	Vice-senior general					
3.	ဗိုလ်ချုပ်ကြီး	General	Admiral				

== Vice-senior general ==
"Vice-senior general" (Burmese: ဒုတိယဗိုလ်ချုပ်မှူးကြီး, romanized: dautaiya bauilaʻ khayupaʻ mahūʺkarīʺ) is the second highest rank in Myanmar Armed Forces. It is held by the person appointed to both Deputy Commander-in-Chief of Defence Services and Commander-in-Chief (Army). Since 2012, it can also be held by the Commander-in-Chief of Defence Services if he has not yet been promoted to Senior general.

It is between the five-star rank of Senior general and the four-star rank of General or Admiral, thus being a unique rank existing only in Myanmar Armed Forces. The rank medals of both Vice-Senior general and General/Admiral have the same obverse; both with golden logo of Armed Forces and four golden stars overheading it, but the rank medal of Senior general has a green stripe in addition to that of General/Admiral. Thus, it can be assumed as a higher variant of four-star rank. The flag of Deputy Commander-in-Chief of Defence Services also confirms that.

=== Insignia ===
Burmese title	English title	Rank insignia	Golden strap	Rank medal	Flag	Car insignia
ဒုတိယဗိုလ်ချုပ်မှူးကြီး	Vice-senior general					

Insignia on regular uniform	of Myanmar Army	of Myanmar Navy	of Myanmar Air Force

=== History ===
When the five-star rank Senior general was created above the four-star rank General, there was no Vice-senior general or similar rank between them. In 1990, General Saw Maung promoted himself directly to Senior general, his deputy: Lieutenant General Than Shwe to General, and Brigadier General Maung Aye to Major general. In 1993, General Than Shwe was promoted directly to Senior general, and Major General Maung Aye was promoted to Lieutenant general and became deputy of Than Shwe.

Lieutenant General Maung Aye was promoted to General in 1994, and then Vice-senior general in 2002. Thus, he became the first person to hold the rank of Vice-senior general.

=== List of rank holders ===
No.	Photo	Name	Date of promotion from previous rank	Date of promotion to next rank or retirement	Remark
1.		Maung Aye	1 December 2002	30 March 2011	Promoted from General. Retired.
2.		Min Aung Hlaing	1 April 2012	27 March 2013	Promoted from General. Promoted to Senior general.
3.		Soe Win	27 March 2013	10 April 2026	Promoted from General. Retired.

== General/Admiral ==
'General' or 'Admiral' (Burmese: ဗိုလ်ချုပ်ကြီး, romanized: bauilaʻ khayupaʻ karīʺ) is the third highest rank in the Myanmar Armed Forces, and traditionally the highest rank that a personnel from the Myanmar Navy and the Myanmar Air Force can obtain. It is a four-star general rank.

The rank's Burmese title and insignia is the same for all branches. The Myanmar Navy uses a different English translation to be harmonized with the naval terms; "ဗိုလ်ချုပ်ကြီး" is translated as "General" for army and air force, and as "Admiral" for navy.

Since 2011, the rank "ဗိုလ်ချုပ်ကြီး" is designated to be held by the persons in following appointments.

Appointment	Service branch	Number of posts
Chief of General Staff (Army, Navy, Air)	(can be promoted from any of the three branches)	1
Commander-in-Chief (Navy)	Defence Services (Navy)	1
Commander-in-Chief (Air)	Defence Services (Air)	1

Beside these appointments, the Defence Services personnels appointed as Union Ministers in the Union Government can also hold this rank. Currently, the Union Ministers for Defence and for Home Affairs are Generals.

=== Insignia ===
Service branch	Burmese title	English title	Rank insignia	Golden strap	Rank medal	Car insignia
Myanmar Army and Myanmar Air Force	ဗိုလ်ချုပ်ကြီး	General				
Myanmar Navy	ဗိုလ်ချုပ်ကြီး	Admiral				

Insignia on regular uniform	of Myanmar Army	of Myanmar Navy	of Myanmar Air Force

=== List of rank holders in Defence Services (Army) ===
There have been 22 people with the rank of "General" in the Defence Services (Army).

No.	Photo	Name	Date of promotion from previous rank	Date of promotion to next rank or retirement	Remark
1.		Ne Win	1 January 1956	20 April 1972	Promoted from Lieutenant-General. Retired.
2.		San Yu	20 April 1972	3 March 1978	Promoted from Brigadier-General. Retired.
3.		Tin Oo	8 March 1975	6 March 1976	Promoted from Brigadier-General. Retired.
4.		Kyaw Htin	6 March 1977	30 November 1985	Promoted from Major-General. Retired.
5.		Saw Maung	4 November 1986	18 March 1990	Promoted from Lieutenant-General. Promoted to Senior General.
6.		Than Shwe	18 March 1990	23 April 1993	Promoted from Lieutenant-General. Promoted to Senior General.
7.		Maung Aye	23 April 1994	1 December 2002	Promoted from Lieutenant-General. Promoted to Vice-Senior General.
8.		Khin Nyunt	1 December 2002	19 October 2004	Promoted from Lieutenant-General. Retired.
9.		Shwe Mann	2003	26 August 2010	Promoted from Lieutenant-General. Retired.
10.		Soe Win	21 June 2005	12 October 2007	Promoted from Lieutenant-General. Died in office.
11.		Thein Sein	5 November 2007	27 April 2010	Promoted from Lieutenant-General. Retired.
12.		Tin Aung Myint Oo	25 March 2009	26 August 2010	Promoted from Lieutenant-General. Retired.
13.		Min Aung Hlaing	20 March 2011	1 April 2012	Promoted from Lieutenant-General. Promoted to Vice-Senior General.
14.		Soe Win	1 April 2012	27 March 2013	Promoted from Lieutenant-General. Promoted to Vice-Senior General.
15.		Hla Htay Win	1 April 2012	13 August 2015	Promoted from Lieutenant-General. Retired.
16.		Mya Tun Oo	August 2016	31 July 2025	Promoted from Lieutenant-General. Retired.
17.		Maung Maung Aye	20 March 2021	10 April 2026	Promoted from Lieutenant-General. Retired.
18.		Nyo Saw	15 August 2024	31 July 2025	Promoted from Lieutenant-General. Retired.
19.		Aung Lin Dwe	15 August 2024	31 July 2025	Promoted from Lieutenant-General. Retired.
20.		Ye Win Oo	15 August 2024	Incumbent	Promoted from Lieutenant-General. Currently serving.
21.		Kyaw Swa Lin	20 March 2025	Incumbent	Promoted from Lieutenant-General. Currently serving.
22.		Ko Ko Oo	1 July 2026	Incumbent	Promoted from Lieutenant-General. Currently serving.

=== List of rank holders in Defence Services (Navy) ===
There have been 5 people with the rank of "Admiral" in the Defence Services (Navy).

No.	Photo	Name	Date of promotion from previous rank	Date of promotion to next rank or retirement	Remark
1.		Nyan Tun	1 April 2012	15 August 2012	Promoted from Vice-Admiral. Retired.
2.		Thet Swe	2013	10 August 2015	Promoted from Vice-Admiral. Retired.
3.		Tin Aung San	10 April 2016	31 July 2025	Promoted from Vice-Admiral. Retired.
4.		Moe Aung	20 March 2021	10 April 2026	Promoted from Vice-Admiral. Retired.
5.		Htein Win	5 December 2024	Incumbent	Promoted from Vice-Admiral. Currently serving.

=== List of rank holders in Defence Services (Air) ===
There have been 5 people with the rank of "General" in the Defence Services (Air).

No.	Photo	Name	Date of promotion from previous rank	Date of promotion to next rank or retirement	Remark
1.		Myat Hein	1 April 2012	13 February 2013	Promoted from Lieutenant-General. Retired.
2.		Khin Aung Myint	2013	2 January 2018	Promoted from Lieutenant-General. Retired.
3.		Maung Maung Kyaw	3 January 2018	9 January 2022	Promoted from Lieutenant-General. Retired.
4.		Tun Aung	20 March 2022	14 October 2026	Promoted from Lieutenant-General. Retired.
5.		Tun Win	20 July 2026	Incumbent	Promoted from Lieutenant-General. Currently serving.
