= National Defence and Security Council (Myanmar) =

Constitutional body in Myanmar's government

- အမျိုးသားကာကွယ်ရေးနှင့် လုံခြုံရေးကောင်စီ

Agency overview
- Formed: 30 March 2011
- Jurisdiction: Government of Myanmar
- Headquarters: Nay Pyi Taw, Myanmar
- Agency executive: Min Aung Hlaing, President of Myanmar
- Website: Official website

The National Defence and Security Council (Burmese: အမျိုးသား ကာကွယ်ရေးနှင့် လုံခြုံရေး ကောင်စီ, Burmese pronunciation: [əmjóðá kàkwɛ̀jé n̥ḭɴ lòʊɴdʑòʊɴjé kàʊɴsì]; abbreviated NDSC) is an eleven-member national security council responsible for security and defence affairs in Myanmar. Though the president is the chief executive of the government of Myanmar, the 2008 Constitution reserves certain important executive powers for the NDSC and certain actions of the president and the Tatmadaw (military) require approval by the NDSC. Of the 11 members, the commander-in-chief of defence services appoints 5 members and controls 6 votes. The NDSC's existence is enshrined in Chapter V of the 2008 Constitution of Myanmar, and it was formed on 31 March 2011.

A meeting of the NDSC can only be called by the president, which was never done during the National League for Democracy's 2016–2021 time in power. After President Win Myint refused to call a meeting of the NDSC to address the Tatmadaw's baseless allegations of massive voter fraud in the 2020 general election, the Tatmadaw under the leadership of Commander-in-Chief Min Aung Hlaing executed a coup on 1 February 2021, removing Win Myint and installing Myint Swe as Acting President so he could call a meeting of the NDSC and transfer state power to Min Aung Hlaing. The declaration of a state of emergency by the NDSC served as the purported legal basis for all powers exercised by Min Aung Hlaing during his military rule. After the state of emergency expired in 2025 and the State Administration Council was dissolved, Min Aung Hlaing ruled directly through the NDSC until being elected president in 2026.

The opposition National Unity Government designated the NDSC a terrorist organization in November 2025.

== Powers ==
The NDSC's constitutionally enshrined roles include expansive powers:

- Recommend pardonees for the President to grant amnesty
- Approve the President's act of severing foreign diplomatic relations
- Coordinate with the President to take military action against aggressors
- Approve the Tatmadaw's ability to conscript citizens
- Nominate a candidate for Commander-in-Chief of Defence Services, to be appointed by the president
- Coordinate with the President in declaring a state of emergency
- Exercise legislative, executive and judiciary powers during a state of emergency
- Exercise sovereign power during a state of emergency

== Composition ==
According to the Constitution, NDSC's membership must consist of the following individuals:

- President
- Vice-President
- Vice-President
- Speaker of the Pyithu Hluttaw
- Speaker of the Amyotha Hluttaw
- Commander-in-Chief of Defence Services
- Deputy Commander-in-Chief of Defence Services
- Union Minister for Defence
- Union Minister for Foreign Affairs
- Union Minister for Home Affairs
- Union Minister for Border Affairs

== Historical compositions ==
=== National Defence and Security Council of Thein Sein (2011–2016) ===
| Position | Name |
|---|---|
| President | Thein Sein |
| Vice-President | Tin Aung Myint Oo (2011–2012) |
| Vice-President | Sai Mauk Kham (2012–2016) |
| Vice-President | Sai Mauk Kham (2011–2012) |
| Vice-President | Nyan Tun (2012–2016) |
| Speaker of the Pyithu Hluttaw | Shwe Mann (2011–2016) |
| Speaker of the Pyithu Hluttaw | Win Myint (2016) |
| Speaker of the Amyotha Hluttaw | Khin Aung Myint (2011–2016) |
| Speaker of the Amyotha Hluttaw | Mahn Win Khaing Than (2016) |
| Commander-in-Chief of Defence Services | Min Aung Hlaing |
| Deputy Commander-in-Chief of Defence Services | Soe Win |
| Union Minister for Defence | Hla Min (2011–2012) |
| Union Minister for Defence | Wai Lwin (2012–2015) |
| Union Minister for Defence | Sein Win (2015–2016) |
| Union Minister for Foreign Affairs | Wunna Maung Lwin |
| Union Minister for Home Affairs | Ko Ko |
| Union Minister for Border Affairs | Thein Htay (2011–2013) |
| Union Minister for Border Affairs | Thet Naing Win (2013–2015) |
| Union Minister for Border Affairs | Kyaw Swe (2015–2016) |

=== National Defence and Security Council of Htin Kyaw (2016–2018) ===
| Position | Name |
|---|---|
| President | Htin Kyaw (2016–2018) |
| President | Myint Swe Acting (2018) |
| Vice-President | Myint Swe |
| Vice-President | Henry Van Thio |
| Speaker of the Pyithu Hluttaw | Win Myint (2016–2018) |
| Speaker of the Pyithu Hluttaw | T Khun Myat (2018) |
| Speaker of the Amyotha Hluttaw | Mahn Win Khaing Than |
| Commander-in-Chief of Defence Services | Min Aung Hlaing |
| Deputy Commander-in-Chief of Defence Services | Soe Win |
| Union Minister for Defence | Sein Win |
| Union Minister for Foreign Affairs | Aung San Suu Kyi |
| Union Minister for Home Affairs | Kyaw Swe |
| Union Minister for Border Affairs | Ye Aung |

=== National Defence and Security Council of Win Myint (2018–2021) ===
| Position | Name |
|---|---|
| President | Win Myint |
| Vice-President | Myint Swe |
| Vice-President | Henry Van Thio |
| Speaker of the Pyithu Hluttaw | T Khun Myat |
| Speaker of the Amyotha Hluttaw | Mahn Win Khaing Than |
| Commander-in-Chief of Defence Services | Min Aung Hlaing |
| Deputy Commander-in-Chief of Defence Services | Soe Win |
| Union Minister for Defence | Sein Win |
| Union Minister for Foreign Affairs | Aung San Suu Kyi |
| Union Minister for Home Affairs | Kyaw Swe (2018–2020) |
| Union Minister for Home Affairs | Soe Htut (2020–2021) |
| Union Minister for Border Affairs | Ye Aung |

=== National Defence and Security Council of Myint Swe (2021–2025) ===
| Position | Name |
|---|---|
| Pro Tem President (Note: Titled "Pro Tem (President)" in the English version of Ordinance 1/2021. Later called "Pro Tem President" by State-owned English media outlets.) | Myint Swe |
| Pro Tem President | Min Aung Hlaing (On Duty) (2024-2025) |
| Vice-President | Myint Swe |
| Vice-President | Henry Van Thio (2021-2024) |
| Speaker of the Pyithu Hluttaw | T Khun Myat |
| Speaker of the Amyotha Hluttaw | – |
| Commander-in-Chief of Defence Services | Min Aung Hlaing |
| Deputy Commander-in-Chief of Defence Services | Soe Win |
| Union Minister for Defence | Mya Tun Oo (2021-2023) |
| Union Minister for Defence | Tin Aung San (2023-2024) |
| Union Minister for Defence | Maung Maung Aye (2024-2025) |
| Union Minister for Foreign Affairs | Wunna Maung Lwin (2021-2023) |
| Union Minister for Foreign Affairs | Than Swe (2023-2025) |
| Union Minister for Home Affairs | Soe Htut (2021-2023) |
| Union Minister for Home Affairs | Yar Pyae (2023-2025) |
| Union Minister for Home Affairs | Tun Tun Naung (2025) |
| Union Minister for Border Affairs | Tun Tun Naung (2021-2025) |
| Union Minister for Border Affairs | Yar Pyae (2025) |

=== National Defence and Security Council of Min Aung Hlaing (2025–2026) ===
| Position | Name |
|---|---|
| Acting President | Min Aung Hlaing |
| Vice-President | Nyo Saw |
| Vice-President | Nan Ni Ni Aye |
| Speaker of the Pyithu Hluttaw | T Khun Myat (2025-2026) |
| Speaker of the Pyithu Hluttaw | Khin Yi (2026) |
| Speaker of the Amyotha Hluttaw | Aung Lin Dwe (2026) |
| Commander-in-Chief of Defence Services | Min Aung Hlaing (2025-2026) |
| Commander-in-Chief of Defence Services | Ye Win Oo (2026) |
| Deputy Commander-in-Chief of Defence Services | Soe Win (2025-2026) |
| Deputy Commander-in-Chief of Defence Services | Kyaw Swar Lin (2026) |
| Union Minister for Defence | Maung Maung Aye |
| Union Minister for Foreign Affairs | Than Swe |
| Union Minister for Home Affairs | Tun Tun Naung (2025-2026) |
| Union Minister for Home Affairs | Phone Myat (2026) |
| Union Minister for Border Affairs | Yar Pyae |

==== Office of the National Defence and Security Council ====
National Defense and Security Council did not have an office body. However, it was announced on 31 July 2025 via Order No. 2/2025 that an office body has now been formed with two new positions: Chief Executive and Joint Chief Executive, with former SAC secretary Aung Lwin Dwe as Chief Executive and General Ye Win Oo as Joint Chief Executive. On April 10, 2026, following the formation of Min Aung Hlaing’s second cabinet after his election as president, the establishments that had been created by NDSC were abolished.

=== National Defence and Security Council of Min Aung Hlaing (2026-Present) ===
On 10 April 2026, NDSC was formed with the following members.

| Position | Name |
|---|---|
| President | Min Aung Hlaing |
| Vice President | Nyo Saw |
| Vice President | Nan Ni Ni Aye |
| Speaker of the Pyithu Hluttaw | Khin Yi |
| Speaker of the Amyotha Hluttaw | Aung Lin Dwe |
| Commander-in-Chief of Defence Services | Ye Win Oo |
| Deputy Commander-in-Chief of Defence Services | Kyaw Swar Lin |
| Union Minister for Defence | Tun Aung |
| Union Minister for Foreign Affairs | Tin Maung Swe |
| Union Minister for Home Affairs | Nyunt Win Swe (April 2026 - September 2026) |
| Union Minister for Home Affairs | Ko Ko Oo (September 2026 - Present) |
| Union Minister for Border Affairs | Phone Myat |

== See also ==
- Government of Burma
