= Commander-in-Chief of the Myanmar Air Force =

Chief of the Myanmar Air Force

Commander-in-Chief (Air)
- ကာကွယ်ရေးဦးစီးချုပ် (လေ)
- Incumbent; Tun Win since 21 April 2026
- Office of the Commander-in-Chief (Air)
- Member of: National Defence and Security Council
- Reports to: Commander-in-Chief of Defence Services
- Seat: Naypyidaw, Myanmar
- Appointer: Military Appointments General
- Formation: 1947 (as CO, Burma Air Force); 1989 (as C-in-C(Air))
- First holder: Saw Shi Sho (as CO, Burma Air Force); Tin Tun (as C-in-C(Air))
- Deputy: Chief of Staff (Air)

The Commander-in-Chief (Air) (Burmese: ကာကွယ်ရေးဦးစီးချုပ် (လေ)) is the highest-ranking officer in the Defence Services (Air), the air force branch of Myanmar Defence Services or Tatmadaw. The officeholder reports directly to the Commander-in-Chief of Defence Services and is a member of the highest defence leadership within the country. After the unification of Army, Navy, and Air Force in 1955, the Tatmadaw had the Chief of Staff system and the branches were led by Vice Chief of Staff (Army), Vice Chief of Staff (Navy), and Vice Chief of Staff (Air), respectively, until 1989. A new system was introduced in 1989 during the reorganisation and each branch is now led by its own Commander-in-Chief. Notably, a Commander-in-Chief (Air) has simultaneously served as the Chief of the General Staff (Army, Navy and Air) for about a year.

== List of CO/ CAS/ VCS(Air)/ C-in-C(Air) ==
(Dates in italics indicate de facto continuation of office)

| No. | Portrait | Name (Birth–Death) | Term of office | | | Ref. |
| No. | Portrait | Name (Birth–Death) | Took office | Left office | Time in office | Ref. |
Commanding Officer, Burma Air Force
| 1 | | Wing Commander; Saw Shi Sho (?–?) | 15 December 1947 | 8 May 1948 | 145 days | |
Chief of Air Staff
| (1) | | Wing Commander; Saw Shi Sho (?–?) | 8 May 1948 | 10 February 1949 | 278 days | |
| 2 | | Lieutenant Colonel; Thura Selwyn James Khin (?–?) | 23 February 1949 | 15 June 1950 | 1 year, 125 days | |
| 3 | | Brigadier General; Thura Tommy Clift (?–?) | 15 June 1950 | 28 September 1955 | 5 years, 105 days | |
Vice Chief of Staff, Defence Services (Air)
| (3) | | Brigadier General; Thura Tommy Clift (?–?) | 28 September 1955 | 26 November 1963 | 8 years, 59 days | |
| 4 | | Brigadier General; Thaung Dan (1923–1998) | 27 November 1963 | 7 March 1974 | 10 years, 100 days | |
| 5 | | Major General; Thura Saw Phyu (?–?) | 8 March 1974 | 18 March 1980 | 6 years, 0 days | |
| 6 | | Major General; Ko Gyi (?–?) | 19 March 1980 | 14 November 1985 | 5 years, 240 days | |
| 7 | | Lieutenant General; Tin Tun (?–?) | 14 November 1985 | 10 May 1989 | 3 years, 177 days | |
Commander-in-Chief (Air)
| (7) | | Lieutenant General; Tin Tun (?–?) | 10 May 1989 | 5 February 1992 | 2 years, 271 days | |
| 8 | | Lieutenant General; Thein Win (?–?) | 5 February 1992 | 15 June 1995 | 3 years, 130 days | |
| 9 | | Lieutenant General; Tin Ngwe (?–?) | 15 June 1995 | 14 November 1997 | 2 years, 152 days | |
| 10 | | Lieutenant General; Kyaw Than (?–?) | 15 November 1997 | 13 July 2001 | 3 years, 240 days | |
| 11 | | Major General; Myint Swe (?–?) | 13 July 2001 | 2 May 2002 | 293 days | |
| 12 | | General; Myat Hein (born 1955) | 18 May 2002 | 14 February 2013 | 10 years, 272 days | |
| 13 | | General; Khin Aung Myint (born 1958) | 14 February 2013 | 2 January 2018 | 4 years, 322 days | |
| 14 | | General; Maung Maung Kyaw (born 1964) | 3 January 2018 | 9 January 2022 | 4 years, 6 days | |
| 15 | | General; Htun Aung (born 1967) | 10 January 2022 | 10 April 2026 | 4 years, 90 days | |
| 16 | | Lieutenant General; Tun Win (born 1970) | 10 April 2026 | Incumbent | 150 days | |

== Existing positions named C-in-C and CS ==
1. Commander-in-Chief of Defence Services
2. Deputy Commander-in-Chief of Defence Services
3. Commander-in-Chief (Army)
4. Chief of the General Staff (Army, Navy and Air)
5. Commander-in-Chief (Navy)
6. Commander-in-Chief (Air)
- 7.
  - Chief of Staff (Army)
  - Chief of Staff (Navy)
  - Chief of Staff (Air)
