= State Security and Peace Commission =

Myanmar government body

- နိုင်ငံတော်လုံခြုံရေးနှင့် အေးချမ်းသာယာရေးကော်မရှင်
- State Seal of Myanmar

Overview
- Established: 31 July 2025; 15 months ago
- Dissolved: 10 April 2026; 7 months ago
- State: Myanmar
- Leader: Chairman (Min Aung Hlaing)
- Appointed by: National Defence and Security Council
- Responsible to: National Defence and Security Council

The State Security and Peace Commission (Burmese: နိုင်ငံတော်လုံခြုံရေးနှင့် အေးချမ်းသာယာရေးကော်မရှင်; abbrevaited SSPC or နလအ) was an advisory Myanmar government body appointed by the National Defence and Security Council that existed from 31 July 2025 to 10 April 2026, for a total of 8 months and 10 days. It had no legal power over military operations, the law, or the executive branch, with all hard power resting with the NDSC. Its function was to assist military ruler Min Aung Hlaing in his governance in the lead-up to the 2025 Myanmar general election and the following transition, including through oversight of the Union Government and by formulating policy to be enacted by the NDSC. Min Aung Hlaing has ruled the country since seizing power in 2021, and exercised power through his role on the NDSC since the state of emergency expired in 2025 before the conclusion of the 2025-26 Myanmar general election.

The Commission was established by order No. 4/2025 of the NDSC under Section 427 of the 2008 Constitution of Myanmar, which gives the NDSC absolute power to determine the executive in between sessions of the legislature. The Commission's stated purpose was to ensure—through "guidance and coordination"—the election is held and a new elected administration is sworn in.

The SSPC did not replace the State Administration Council, which was the junta under the state of emergency. Rather, the SAC's powers were transferred back to the NDSC at the conclusion of the state of emergency, including the powers to enact legislation and appoint ministers. The SSPC instead served as a coordinating body for Min Aung Hlaing's top military deputies to formulate policy with him, which, if necessary, is enacted through the NDSC, and to oversee its implementation by the Union Government. Therefore, despite having nominally limited powers, the SSPC was stacked with a similar powerful membership to the makeup of the SAC, and its formation had been considered part of a cosmetic reordering of the existing power structure. The SSPC's key policy areas were the election, the economy, and preserving the Tatmadaw's central role in Myanmar's political system. Analysis by the Stimson Center described the SSPC as the state's "dominant political organ", in practice directing the Union Government's political strategy and election administration, though the Union Government nominally answers only to the NDSC. The SSPC had ten members, most of them being former members of the SAC. The opposition National Unity Government has designated the SSPC a terrorist organization, labeling it a continuation of the SAC. Min Aung Hlaing used the title of Chairman of the State Security and Peace Commission in formal diplomatic engagements.

The SSPC has been cited as the National Security and Peace Commission (NSPC) as well.

== Membership ==
Only membership (31 July 2025 – 10 April 2026)
No	Name	Role	Other positions held
1	Min Aung Hlaing	Chairman	Acting President of Myanmar (Note: Pro Tem (On Duty) until 7 August 2025); Commander-in-Chief of Defence Services
2	Soe Win	Vice-Chairman	Deputy Commander-in-Chief of Defence Services
3	Nyo Saw	Member	Prime Minister; Union Minister for National Planning and Economic Development
4	Aung Lin Dwe	Member	Chief Executive, Office of the NDSC
5	Maung Maung Aye	Member	Union Minister for Defence
6	Phone Myat	Member	Union Minister for Home Affairs
7	Than Swe	Member	Union Minister for Foreign Affairs
8	Yar Pyae	Member	Union Minister for Border Affairs
9	Kyaw Swar Lin	Member	Armed Forces Joint Chief of Staff
10	Ye Win Oo	Secretary	Joint Chief Executive, Office of the NDSC

== Dissolution ==
The State Security and Peace Commission was officially dissolved following the swearing in of Min Aung Hlaing as president of Myanmar on 10 April 2026.
