= Chief of the General Staff (Army, Navy and Air) =

Myanmar joint chief of staff

- ညှိနှိုင်းကွပ်ကဲရေးမှူး(ကြည်း၊ရေ၊လေ)
- Incumbent; General Ko Ko Oo since 30 March 2026
- Office of the Chief of the General Staff (Army, Navy and Air)
- Reports to: Commander-in-Chief of Defence Services
- Seat: Naypyidaw, Myanmar
- Appointer: Military Appointments General
- Formation: 9 November 2001
- First holder: General Thura Shwe Mann
- Unofficial names: ညှိကွပ်
- Deputy: Commander-in-Chief (Navy); Commander-in-Chief (Air)

Chief of the General Staff (Army, Navy and Air) (Burmese: ညှိနှိုင်းကွပ်ကဲရေးမှူး(ကြည်း၊ ရေ၊ လေ); abbr. ညှိကွပ်), also spelled "Chief of the General Staff (Army, Navy, Air)", is a single-person appointment of joint chief of staff in Myanmar Defence Services a.k.a. Tatmadaw, the combined military of Myanmar. Created in 2001, it is the fourth-highest appointment, higher than the Commander-in-Chief (Navy) and Commander-in-Chief (Air), but subordinate to the Commander-in-Chief (Army). It is practically the third-highest since the second-highest appointment of Deputy Commander-in-Chief of Defence Services and the third-highest appointment of Commander-in-Chief (Army) are usually held by a single officer. Army generals are usually appointed in this position but, notably, a Commander-in-Chief (Air) has simultaneously served as the Chief of the General Staff (Army, Navy and Air).

== List of CGS ==
No.	Portrait	Name	Term of office			Remark	Ref.
No.	Portrait	Name	Took offic	Left office	Time in Office	Remark	Ref.
Chief of the General Staff (Army, Navy and Air)
1		General; Thura Shwe Mann	9 November 2001	26 August 2010	8 years, 290 days	Later became the Speaker of the Pyithu Hluttaw	
2		General; Min Aung Hlaing	27 August 2010	29 March 2011	214 days	Later appointed as the Commander-in-Chief of Defence Services. Later became the President.	
3		General; Hla Htay Win	30 March 2011	13 August 2015	4 years, 136 days		
4		General; Khin Aung Myint	14 August 2015	25 August 2016	1 year, 11 days	Simultaneously serving as the Commander-in-Chief (Air).	
5		General; Mya Tun Oo	26 August 2016	1 February 2021	4 years, 159 days	Later appointed as a minister and a deputy prime minister.	
6		General; Maung Maung Aye	2 February 2021	19 August 2024	3 years, 199 days	Later appointed as the secretary of the Union Consultative Council.	
7		General; Kyaw Swar Lin	18 December 2021	30 March 2026	4 years, 102 days	Later appointed as the Deputy Commander-in-Chief of Defence Services, Commander-in-Chief (Army).	
8		General; Ko Ko Oo	30 March 2026	Incumbent	228 days		

== Existing positions named C-in-C and CS ==
1. Commander-in-Chief of Defence Services
2. Deputy Commander-in-Chief of Defence Services
3. Commander-in-Chief (Army)
4. Chief of the General Staff (Army, Navy and Air)
5. Commander-in-Chief (Navy)
6. Commander-in-Chief (Air)
- 7.
  - Chief of Staff (Army)
  - Chief of Staff (Navy)
  - Chief of Staff (Air)
