= Ko Ko Oo (general) =

Burmese army general (born 1972)

His Excellency Lieutenant General Ko Ko Oo
- ကိုကိုဦး

Union Minister of Home Affairs
- Incumbent
- Assumed office 17 September 2026
- President: Min Aung Hlaing
- Preceded by: Nyunt Win Swe

Chief of the General Staff (Army, Navy and Air)
- In office 30 March 2026 – 17 September 2026
- Leader: Ye Win Oo
- Preceded by: Kyaw Swar Lin

Commander of the Bureau of Special Operations No. 3
- In office August 2023 – September 2025

Personal details
- Born: 2 December 1972 (age 53) Bhamo, Myanmar (Burma)
- Education: Defence Services Academy

Military service
- Allegiance: Myanmar
- Branch/service: Myanmar Army
- Years of service: c. 1990s–present
- Rank: Lieutenant General
- Unit: Central Military Command; Bureau of Special Operations No. 1; BSO 3

Ko Ko Oo (Burmese: ကိုကိုဦး; pronounced [kó kò ʔù]; born 2 December 1972) is a Burmese army general who has held Union Minister for Home Affairs since September 2026. He was appointed Chief of the General Staff (Army, Navy and Air) from March to September 2026.

Over his career, he has led the Central Military Command, Bureau of Special Operations No. 1 (BSO 1), and currently commands Bureau of Special Operations No. 3 (BSO 3).

== Early life and education ==
Ko Ko Oo was born on 2 December 1972 in Bhamo, a town in Kachin State, Myanmar. He attended the Defence Services Academy as part of the institution's 38th intake. During his training, he studied military science, leadership, and internal security, preparing him for command responsibilities in the Myanmar armed forces.

== Military career ==
Ko Ko Oo began military service in the early 1990s. In June 2020, he was appointed as commander of the Central Military Command, headquartered in Mandalay Region. He became one of the youngest officers to hold this post, which is a key regional command in Upper Myanmar.

In August 2023, he was promoted to lieutenant general and reassigned to command BSO 1, a regional bureau covering Mandalay, Sagaing, Magwe, Chin, and Kachin. He was later transferred to BSO 3, which oversees operations in central and western Myanmar. In these roles, he has supervised counterinsurgency operations and regional military coordination in areas affected by resistance movements.

Prior to his senior postings, Ko Ko Oo reportedly served as a personal security officer to General Maung Aye, former vice chairman of the State Peace and Development Council (SPDC).

== Battles and operations ==
While in command of BSO 1 and BSO 3, Ko Ko Oo oversaw military operations in areas with frequent armed clashes between government forces and anti-coup resistance groups. These operations included clearance campaigns in Sagaing and Magwe regions. His command was involved in ground assaults, helicopter deployments, and security operations targeting resistance forces.

== Sanctions ==
On 25 March 2022, the United States Department of the Treasury designated Ko Ko Oo under Executive Order 14014, citing his involvement in military operations following the 2021 coup. The sanctions froze any assets he held under U.S. jurisdiction and prohibited U.S. persons from conducting transactions with him.

== Operational context ==
Ko Ko Oo's commands have operated in regions subject to martial law and military crackdowns. His leadership of Central Command, BSO 1, and BSO 3 has coincided with widespread anti-coup resistance. Human rights organizations have reported allegations of violations during operations under his command, though Ko Ko Oo has not issued any public statements regarding these allegations.

== Public visibility ==
Ko Ko Oo has maintained a low public profile. He has made occasional appearances at military ceremonies, including graduation events at the Defence Services Academy. Analysts have identified him as part of a younger generation of senior officers in the Tatmadaw.
