= Commander-in-Chief of Myanmar Army =

Chief of the Myanmar Army

Commander-in-Chief (Army)
- ကာကွယ်ရေးဦးစီးချုပ် (ကြည်း)
- Flag of the Commander-in-Chief (Army)

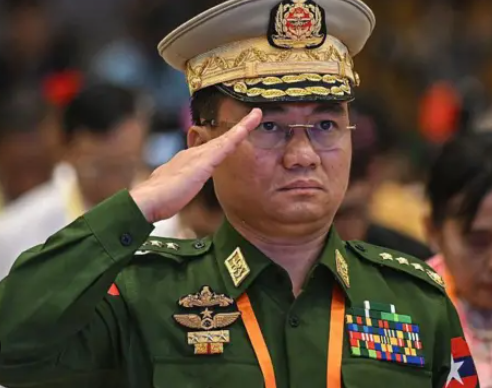
- Incumbent; General Kyaw Swar Lin since 30 March 2026
- Myanmar Army
- Reports to: Commander-in-Chief of Defence Services
- Appointer: Military Appointments General
- Precursor: Deputy Inspector General, Burma Army
- Formation: 1 May 1947 (as DGOC); 10 May 1989 (as CinC(Army))
- First holder: Smith Dun (as DGOC); Than Shwe (as CinC(Army))

Commander-in-Chief (Army) (Burmese: ကာကွယ်ရေးဦးစီးချုပ် (ကြည်း)), is the highest ranking military officer of the Defence Services (Army) a.k.a. Myanmar Army, and the third highest in the Defence Services a.k.a. Tatmadaw. After the unification of Army, Navy, and Air Force in 1955, the Tatmadaw had the Chief of Staff system and the branches were led by Vice Chief of Staff (Army), Vice Chief of Staff (Navy), and Vice Chief of Staff (Air), respectively, until 1989. A new system was introduced in 1989 during the reorganisation and each branch is now led by its own Commander-in-Chief. Since then, except in the special case of the 26-day period in 2026, the Commander-in-Chief (Army) traditionally serves as the Deputy Commander-in-Chief of Defence Services simultaneously.

== List of DGOC/ VCS(Army)/ CinC(Army) ==
(Dates in italics indicate de facto continuation of office)

No.	Portrait	Name	Term of office			Remark	Ref.
No.	Portrait	Name	Took office	Left office	Time in Office	Remark	Ref.
Deputy General Officer Commanding, Burma Army
*		Colonel; Smith Dun	1 May 1947	4 January 1948	248 days days	His appointment as DGOC is recorded in the military's official history but he is not acknowledged as the first person in the official list of VCS/DC-in-CDS, C-in-C (Army). Later became the first military chief of independent Burma as GOC	
1.		Brigadier General; Saw Kyar Doe	14 April 1948	30 July 1949	107 days days	Ethnic Karen Officer, then named "Deputy General Officer Commanding". Saw Kyar Doe moved to the post of Chief of Operation but forced to retire due to civil war with Karen Listed as the first VCS/C-in-CDS, C-in-C (Army) in the official list even though he had retired before 1955	
2.		Major General; Ne Win	1 August 1948	1 February 1949	184 days days	Listed in the official list of VCS/DC-in-CDS, C-in-C (Army) even though his term of office was before 1955. Promoted to GOC in 1949; subsequently became the first Chief of Staff of the unified Tatmadaw, the Defence Services, in 1955	
Vice Chief of Staff, Defence Services (Army)
3.		Brigadier General; Aung Gyi	9 April 1959	19 February 1963	3 years, 316 days	Promoted from Colonel General Staff in April 1959 as Vice Chief Staff (Army) but resigned in February 1963 and was imprisoned few times. First Chairman of NLD but left after few months in December 1988	
4.		Brigadier General; San Yu	15 February 1963	20 April 1972	9 years, 65 days	Later became the Chief of Staff in 1972	
5.		Brigadier General; Tin Oo	20 April 1972	7 March 1974	1 year, 321 days	Subsequently promoted to Chief of Staff in 1974. Later became Vice-Chairman of National League for Democracy.	
6.		Brigadier General; Thura Kyaw Htin	8 March 1974	6 March 1976	1 year, 364 days	Later promoted to Chief of Staff	
7.		Lieutenant General; Aye Ko	2 April 1976	7 August 1981	5 years, 127 days	Later became BSPP general secretary and then Vice President.	
8.		Lieutenant General; Tun Yi	7 August 1981	21 July 1983	1 year, 348 days	Retired from Army in 1983 at age 60 and became Member of Council of State till 1988. Then became general secretary and then Chairman of National Unity Party which was re-incarnation of BSPP.	
9.		Lieutenant General; Saw Maung	22 July 1983	4 November 1985	2 years, 105 days	Later became Chief of Staff and then the first Commander-in-Chief of Defence Services	
10.		General; Than Shwe	4 November 1985	10 May 1989	3 years, 187 days		
Commander-in-Chief (Army)							
(10)		General; Than Shwe	10 May 1989	23 April 1992	2 years, 349 days	Later promoted to the Commander-in-Chief of Defence Services	
11		Vice-Senior General; Maung Aye	24 April 1992	30 March 2011	18 years, 340 days		
12		Vice-Senior General; Soe Win	30 March 2011	4 March 2026	14 years, 339 days	Remained as the Deputy Commander-in-Chief of Defence Services until 30 March 2026.	
13		General; Ye Win Oo	4 March 2026	30 March 2026	26 days	Subsequently became the Commander-in-Chief of Defence Services.	
14		General; Kyaw Swar Lin	30 March 2026	Incumbent	188 days		

== Existing positions named C-in-C and CS ==
1. Commander-in-Chief of Defence Services
2. Deputy Commander-in-Chief of Defence Services
3. Commander-in-Chief (Army)
4. Chief of the General Staff (Army, Navy and Air)
5. Commander-in-Chief (Navy)
6. Commander-in-Chief (Air)
- 7.
  - Chief of Staff (Army)
  - Chief of Staff (Navy)
  - Chief of Staff (Air)
