= Commander-in-Chief of the Myanmar Navy =

Chief of the Myanmar Navy

Commander-in-Chief (Navy)
- ကာကွယ်ရေးဦးစီးချုပ် (ရေ)
- Incumbent; Htein Win since 14 July 2024
- Office of the Commander-in-Chief (Navy)
- Member of: National Defence and Security Council
- Reports to: Commander-in-Chief of Defence Services
- Seat: Naypyidaw, Myanmar
- Appointer: Military Appointments General
- Formation: 1948 (as CO, Burma Navy); 1989 (as C-in-C(Navy))
- First holder: Khin Maung Bo (as CO, Burma Navy); Maung Maung Khin (as C-in-C(Navy))
- Deputy: Chief of Staff (Navy)

The Commander-in-Chief (Navy) (Burmese: ကာကွယ်ရေးဦးစီးချုပ် (ရေ)) is the highest-ranking officer in the Defence Services (Navy), the navy branch of Myanmar Defence Services or Tatmadaw. The officeholder reports directly to the Commander-in-Chief of Defence Services and is a member of the highest defence leadership within the country. After the unification of Army, Navy, and Air Force in 1955, the Tatmadaw had the Chief of Staff system and the branches were led by Vice Chief of Staff (Army), Vice Chief of Staff (Navy), and Vice Chief of Staff (Air), respectively, until 1989. A new system was introduced in 1989 during the reorganisation and each branch is now led by its own Commander-in-Chief. Following the 2021 Myanmar coup d'état, leadership changes in the Navy have been closely tied to wider military reshuffles.

== List of CO/ CNS/ VCS(Navy)/ C-in-C(Navy) ==
(Dates in italics indicate de facto continuation of office)

No.	Portrait	Name (Birth–Death)	Term of office			Ref.
No.	Portrait	Name (Birth–Death)	Took office	Left office	Time in office	Ref.
Commanding Officer, Burma Navy
1		Commander; Khin Maung Bo (?–?)	4 January 1948	8 May 1948	125 days	
Chief of Naval Staff
(1)		Commander; Khin Maung Bo (?–?)	8 May 1948	13 June 1952	4 years, 36 days	
2		Commodore; Than Phe (?–?)	14 June 1952	28 September 1955	3 years, 106 days	
Vice Chief of Staff, Defence Services (Navy)
(2)		Commodore; Than Phe (?–?)	28 September 1955	21 May 1962	6 years, 235 days	
3		Commodore; Thaung Tin (?–?)	30 May 1962	7 March 1973	10 years, 281 days	
4		Rear Admiral; Chit Hlaing (?–?)	8 March 1974	15 October 1980	6 years, 221 days	
5		Rear Admiral; Maung Maung Win (?–?)	16 October 1980	4 November 1985	5 years, 19 days	
6		Vice Admiral; Maung Maung Khin (?–?)	5 November 1985	10 May 1989	3 years, 186 days	
Commander-in-Chief (Navy)
(6)		Vice Admiral; Maung Maung Khin (?–?)	10 May 1989	4 February 1992	2 years, 270 days	
7		Vice Admiral; Than Nyunt (?–2023)	5 February 1992	15 June 1995	3 years, 130 days	
8		Vice Admiral; Tin Aye (?–?)	16 June 1995	13 November 1997	2 years, 150 days	
9		Vice Admiral; Nyunt Thein (?–?)	24 November 1997	29 July 2000	2 years, 248 days	
10		Vice Admiral; Kyi Min (?–?)	9 August 2000	1 January 2004	3 years, 145 days	
11		Vice Admiral; Soe Thein (born 1949)	2 January 2004	20 June 2008	4 years, 170 days	
12		Admiral; Nyan Tun (born 1954)	21 June 2008	15 August 2012	4 years, 55 days	
13		Admiral; Thura Thet Swe (born ?)	31 August 2012	10 August 2015	2 years, 344 days	
14		Admiral; Tin Aung San (born 1960)	11 August 2015	1 February 2021	5 years, 174 days	
15		Admiral; Moe Aung (born 1966)	2 February 2021	9 January 2024	2 years, 341 days	
16		Vice Admiral; Zwe Win Myint (born 1968)	9 January 2024	13 July 2024	186 days	
17		Admiral; Htein Win (born 1969)	14 July 2024	Incumbent	2 years, 83 days	

== Existing positions named C-in-C and CS ==
1. Commander-in-Chief of Defence Services
2. Deputy Commander-in-Chief of Defence Services
3. Commander-in-Chief (Army)
4. Chief of the General Staff (Army, Navy and Air)
5. Commander-in-Chief (Navy)
6. Commander-in-Chief (Air)
- 7.
  - Chief of Staff (Army)
  - Chief of Staff (Navy)
  - Chief of Staff (Air)
