= Tin Hla =

Burmese lieutenant general and politician

General Tin Hla

Deputy Prime Minister of Myanmar
- In office 14 November 1998 – November 2001
- Prime Minister: Than Shwe
- Preceded by: Tin Tun
- Succeeded by: Soe Win (2021)

Minister of Military Affairs
- In office 15 November 1997 – November 2001

Lieutenant General

Personal details
- Born: 1939 (age 86–87) Thaton, Mon State, Burma
- Party: State Peace and Development Council (SPDC)
- Spouse: Win Kyi
- Children: Nyo Nyo Tin, Ei Ei Tin, Yee Yee Tin, Tun Tun Tin
- Profession: Politician, Military

Military service
- Allegiance: Myanmar
- Branch/service: Myanmar Army
- Rank: General

Tin Hla was a Lieutenant General in the Burmese army. He was also Deputy Prime Minister and Military Affairs Minister until November 2001.

== Career ==
Tin Hla was the Deputy Prime Minister of Myanmar and the Minister of Military Affairs during Than Shwe's regime. He also took the position of Quartermaster-General and led the 22nd Light Infantry Division in Burma during the 8888 uprising. He was also the founder and chairman of Myanmar Economic Corporation (MEC). He was forced to retire in 2001, accused of corruption, together with Lieutenant General Win Myint, the fourth-highest officer and Secretary 3 of the State Peace and Development Council. The purging of these two from power was believed to be an effort by Khin Nyunt the 9th Prime Minister of Burma (Myanmar) and his predecessor, Than Shwe. Khin Nyunt later underwent house arrest and those falsely charged of various accusations were revealed to the public. While some analysts think that the sacking of the two powerful figures was to improve the business climate, others think that it was a clean-out of hardliners unhappy with the possibility of comprises with Aung San Suu Kyi. Lt Gen Tin Hla, being a Defence Services Academy graduate, is considered as Maung Aye's man.

== Personal ==
Tin Hla was born at Thaton, a town in Mon State, Lower Burma, in 1939. He is married to Daw Win Kyi and had four children.
