= Hla Htay Win =

Burmese army general and politician (born 1957)

His Excellency General Thray Sithu Hla Htay Win
- လှဌေးဝင်း
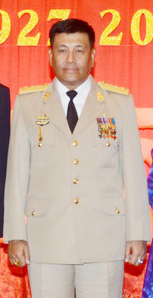
- Hla Htay Win in 2012

Member of the Pyithu Hluttaw for Zeyathiri Township
- In office 1 February 2016 – 31 January 2021
- Preceded by: Shwe Mann
- Succeeded by: Khin Yi (2026)

Chief of the General Staff (Army, Navy and Air)
- In office 2010–2015
- Preceded by: General Min Aung Hlaing
- Succeeded by: General Khin Aung Myint

Personal details
- Born: 1957 (age 68–69) Yangon, Myanmar (formerly Burma)
- Party: Union Solidarity and Development Party
- Education: Defence Services Academy
- Occupation: Army general

Military service
- Allegiance: Myanmar
- Branch/service: Myanmar Army
- Years of service: 1979–2015
- Rank: General
- Unit: Ministry of Defence

Hla Htay Win (Burmese: လှဌေးဝင်း; pronounced [l̥a̰ tʰé wɪ́ɰ̃]; born 1957) is a retired Burmese army general and politician. He previously served as a high-ranking general in the Myanmar Army, holding various leadership positions, including Chief of the General Staff (Army, Navy and Air). In 2015, he resigned from military service and entered politics, joining the Union Solidarity and Development Party (USDP). He was elected as a member of parliament representing the Zeyathiri Township constituency.

== Early life and education ==
Hla Htay Win was born in 1957 in Myanmar. Not much is publicly available about his early life, including details of his family background and upbringing. However, it is known that he pursued a career in the Myanmar military and joined the Defence Services Academy, where he received training as a cadet, laying the foundation for his long career in the Tatmadaw (Myanmar Armed Forces).

== Military career ==
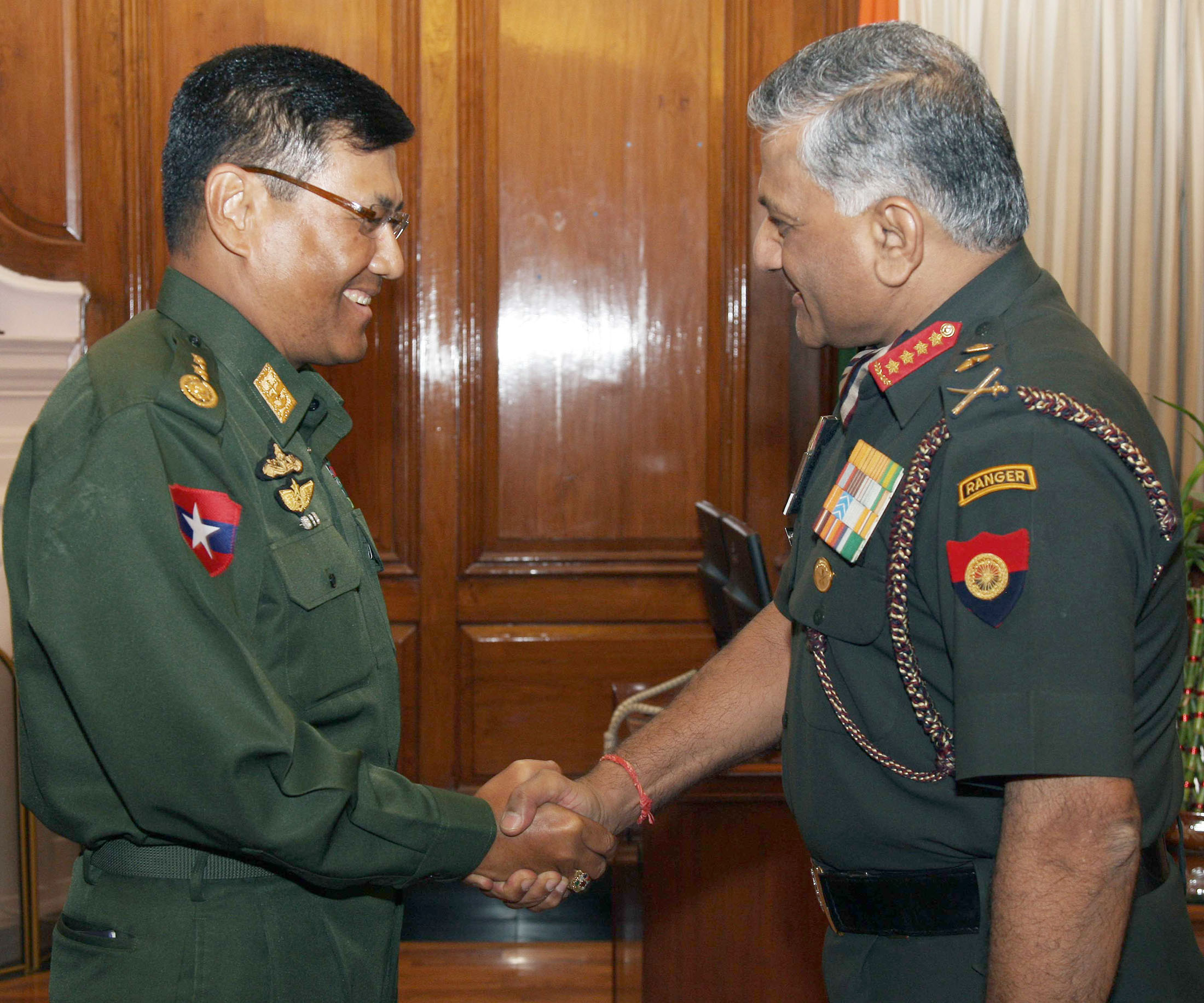
Lieutenant General Hla Htay Win, Joint Chief of Staff of Myanmar Defence Services, meeting General V.K. Singh, Army Chief of India, in New Delhi on 14 October 2011.

Hla Htay Win graduated from the Defence Services Academy (DSA) as part of a 20th intake in 1975. His official gazette number is 14799. He began his career in the Tatmadaw in 1979, eventually rising through the ranks to serve in various significant positions. He commanded the 11th Infantry Division Headquarters and later the Yangon Region Military Headquarters. He also served as Chief Military Training Officer and as Chief of Staff of the Tatmadaw (Army, Navy, Air Force).

=== Notable events ===
On 19 February 2001, a tragic helicopter crash occurred in Karen State, which led to the deaths of several high-ranking military officials. Among the deceased were Lieutenant General Tin Oo, Secretary (2) of the State Peace and Development Council, Major General Thura Thihathura Sis Maung, Commander of the Southeast Regional Military Command, and Brigadier General Loong Maung, Minister of the Prime Minister's Office and Chief of Staff (Army). The crash, which took place near Ba An, also resulted in the loss of other military personnel, marking a significant moment in Myanmar’s military history and leading to subsequent changes in the leadership structure of the Tatmadaw.

== Political career ==
Hla Htay Win retired from the Myanmar Army in 2015 to contest in the Myanmar general elections held that year. He became a member of the Union Solidarity and Development Party (USDP) and served on its Central Executive Committee. Representing Zeyathiri Township in Nay Pyi Taw, he was elected as a member of the Pyithu Hluttaw (House of Representatives). His political career was focused on legislative duties and contributing to the party's goals.

== Personal life ==
Hla Htay Win maintains a private personal life, and not much is publicly known about his family or personal interests. After retiring from the Myanmar Army, he entered the political sphere, where he became a member of the Union Solidarity and Development Party and was elected to the Pyithu Hluttaw (House of Representatives of Myanmar). His focus has largely been on his military and political roles.

== Awards received ==
Hla Htay Win has been recognized for his service with the honorary title of Thray Sithu, awarded by the President of Myanmar, U Thein Sein, who served from 2011 to 2016.
