= Thet Pon =

Burmese military officer

- သက်ပုံ

Commander of Bureau of Special Operations for Yangon Region
- Incumbent
- Assumed office June 2020
- Leader: Min Aung Hlaing

Commander of the Yangon Command
- In office May 2017 – June 2020
- Preceded by: Min Naung
- Succeeded by: Nyunt Win Swe

Personal details
- Born: Burma (now Myanmar)
- Spouse: Hnin Hnin Ei

Military service
- Allegiance: Myanmar
- Branch/service: Myanmar Army
- Rank: Lieutenant General
- Commands: Yangon Command

Lieutenant General Thet Pon (Burmese: သက်ပုံ, also spelt Thet Pone) (BC - 20735), is a Burmese military officer and current commander of the Bureau of Special Operations (BSO) No. 5 for the Yangon Region. He was appointed to the post in June 2020, and previously served as the commander of the Yangon Command. He has been sanctioned by the European Union, Switzerland, and Canada for violating human rights and committing crimes against civilians.

== Military career ==
Thet Pon graduated from the 29th Intake of the Defence Services Academy.

== Personal life ==
Thet Pon is married to Hnin Hnin Ei.

== See also ==
- 2021–2023 Myanmar civil war
- State Administration Council
- Tatmadaw
