= Soe Win (general) =

Burmese general (born 1960)

His Excellency Vice-Senior Genera (Rtd.) Maha Thray Sithu Soe Win
- စိုးဝင်း
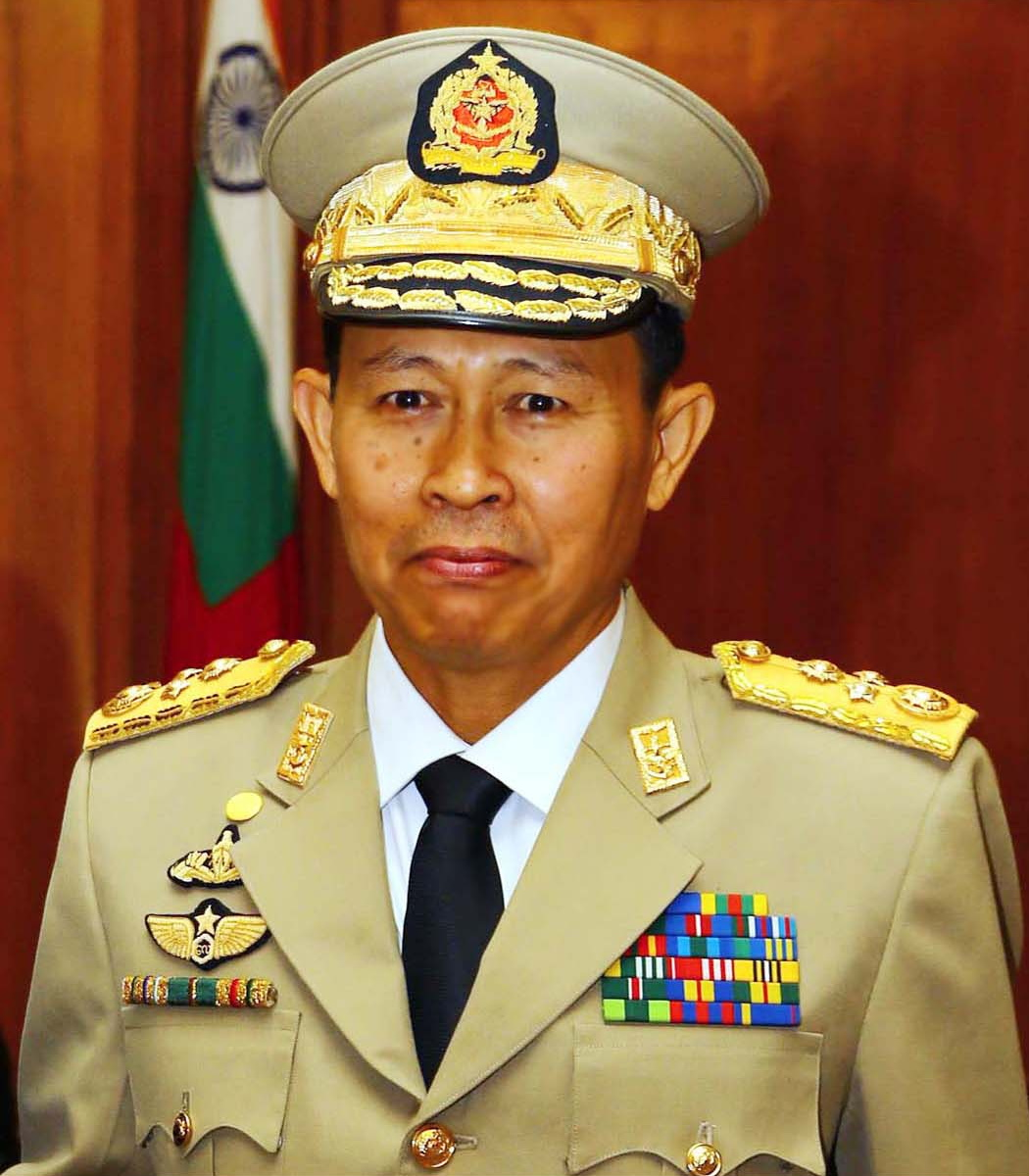
- Soe Win in 2013

Chairman of the Union Consultative Council
- Incumbent
- Assumed office 10 April 2026
- Appointed by: Min Aung Hlaing
- Preceded by: Office established

Vice Chairman of the State Security and Peace Commission
- In office 31 July 2025 – 10 April 2026
- Appointed by: National Defence and Security Council
- Chairman: Min Aung Hlaing
- Preceded by: Office established
- Succeeded by: Office abolished

Vice Chairman of the State Administration Council
- In office 2 February 2021 – 31 July 2025
- Chairman: Min Aung Hlaing
- Preceded by: Office established
- Succeeded by: Office abolished

Deputy Prime Minister of Myanmar
- In office 1 August 2021 – 31 July 2025 Serving with Tin Aung San,Mya Tun Oo, Maung Maung Aye, Win Shein, and Than Swe
- President: Myint Swe (acting); Min Aung Hlaing (acting)
- Prime Minister: Min Aung Hlaing
- Preceded by: Tin Hla (2001)

Deputy Commander-in-Chief of Defence Services
- In office 30 March 2011 – 30 March 2026
- President: Thein Sein; Htin Kyaw; Win Myint; Myint Swe (acting); Min Aung Hlaing (acting)
- Preceded by: Maung Aye
- Succeeded by: Kyaw Swar Lin

Commander-in-Chief of the Myanmar Army
- In office 30 March 2011 – 4 March 2026
- Preceded by: Maung Aye
- Succeeded by: Kyaw Swar Lin

Personal details
- Born: 1 March 1961 (age 65) Mandalay, Union of Burma
- Spouse: Than Than Nwe
- Education: Defence Services Academy

Military service
- Allegiance: Tatmadaw
- Branch/service: Myanmar Army
- Years of service: 1981–2026
- Rank: Vice-Senior General
- Commands: Deputy Commander-in-Chief of Defence Services, Tatmadaw; Commander-in-Chief of Myanmar Army

Soe Win (Burmese: စိုးဝင်း; pronounced [só wɪ́ɴ]; born 1 March 1961) is a retired Burmese general and the current Chairman of the Union Consultative Council.

Appointed following the formation of the provisional government on 1 August 2021, his many roles include being the Vice Chairman of the State Administration Council (SAC), Deputy Commander-in-Chief of the Tatmadaw (Myanmar Armed Forces), and Commander-in-Chief of the Myanmar Army, which he held until March 2026. He was also a member of Myanmar's National Defence and Security Council (NDSC).

In May 2012, President Thein Sein appointed Soe Win to the working committee of the government team responsible for negotiating with Myanmar's many armed ethnic rebel groups, known as the Union Peace-Making Work Committee. He is a close associate of former Vice Chairman of the State Peace and Development Council (SPDC), Vice-Senior General Maung Aye.

== Early life and education ==
Soe Win was born on 1 March 1961 in Mandalay, Burma (now Myanmar), to Chit Sein and Kyin Htwe. In 1976, he attended a cadet course at the Defense Services Academy, alongside Ye Htut, graduating with distinctions in military science and literature. He graduated as part of the 22nd intake in 1981.

== Military career ==
In 1981, Soe Win graduated from the Defense Services Academy (DSA) during its 22nd intake. In June 2008, he became the commander of the Northern Regional Command of the Myanmar Army in Kachin State. In August 2010, he became Chief of the Bureau of Special Operations-6 (BSO-6), overseeing military operations in Chin and Rakhine States and the Magway Region.

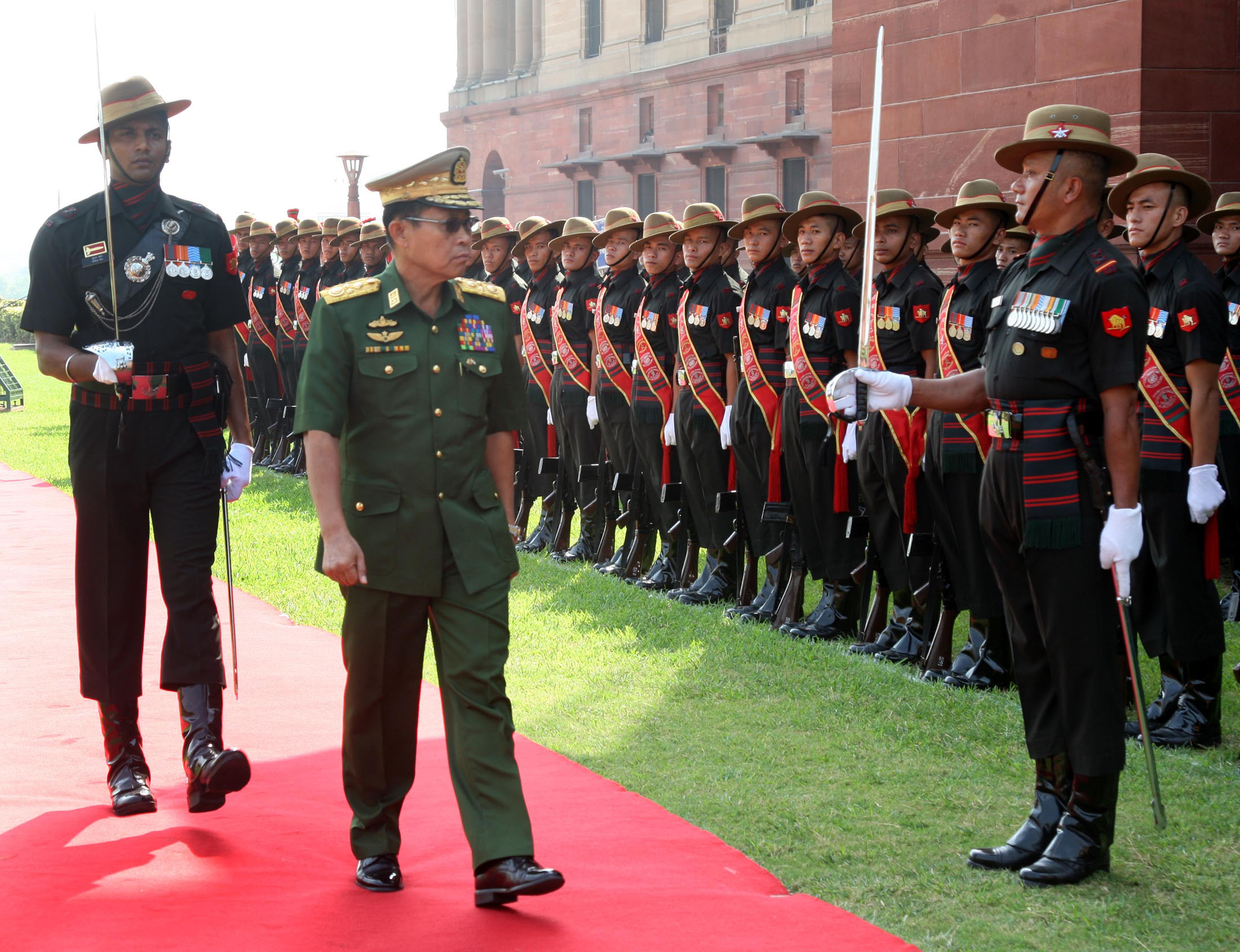
Soe Win inspecting the Guard of Honour, in New Delhi on 18 September 2018.

He had also pressured the Kachin Independence Army (KIA) to convert into a Border Guard Force (BGF) under the control of the military. Despite numerous meetings between Soe Win and KIA leaders in July 2009 and August 2010, the KIA did not become a BGF.

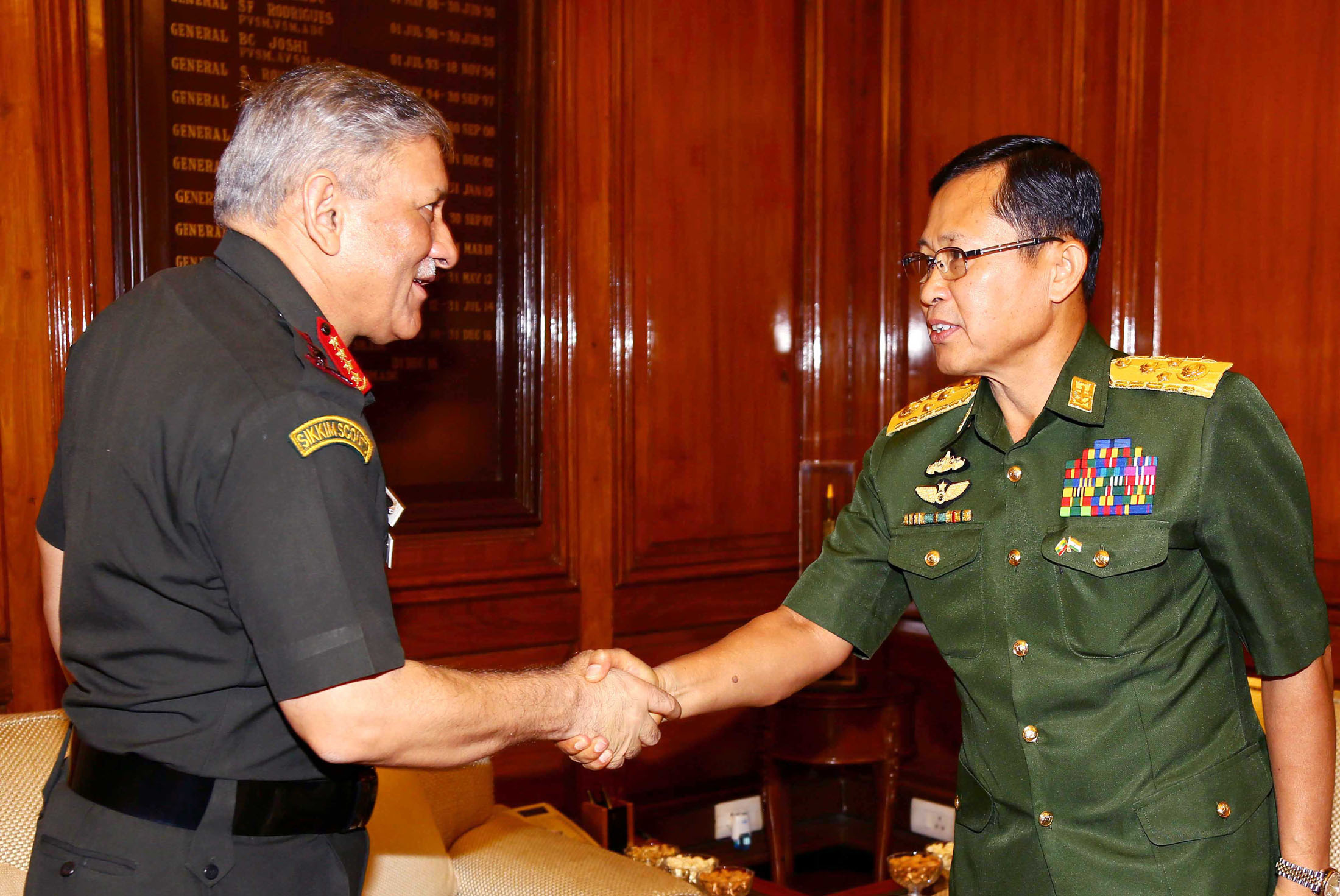
Soe Win meeting General Bipin Rawat, in New Delhi on 18 September 2018.

In September 2011, the KIA accused Soe Win of ordering Tatmadaw soldiers to attack KIA positions in Kachin State, thus violating the terms of multiple ceasefire agreements signed prior to the alleged attacks. Soe Win denied the claims, saying that neither he nor anyone else in the Northern Regional Command had ordered an attack on the KIA.

=== 2024 rumors ===
In April 2024, widespread rumors emerged that Soe Win might have sustained severe injuries during a resistance drone attack on the Southeastern Command headquarters in Mawlamyine, Mon State, where he was allegedly stationed. His absence from public view for over two weeks fuelled speculation, especially after the reported drone attack on 9 April 2024. Concerns about his condition increased due to his non-attendance at the traditional New Year celebrations in Naypyitaw, where he usually appeared with families affiliated with the Commander-in-Chief Office and Naypyitaw's mayor. Soe Win's last public appearance was on 3 April 2024, during a visit to Ba Htoo in southern Shan State.

Despite official denials, rumors persisted, including speculation of a potential purge. Reports indicated growing support for Soe Win to assume military leadership amid recent setbacks and internal strife. However, his reappearance in public on 30 April 2024 alleviated some uncertainty. He was shown on state TV visiting injured soldiers at a military hospital in Mawlamyine, distributing cash rewards to bedridden soldiers for their service. He also met with the chief ministers of Kayin and Mon states to discuss peace and prosperity along the Thai border. During his interaction with officers from the South-East Command Center, his focus reportedly shifted towards matters of war. Soe Win's return to the public eye provided some clarity during a period of heightened speculation and uncertainty.

=== Accusations of corruption ===
Soe Win has been accused of being involved in numerous cases of corruption and extortion during his career as commander of the Northern Regional Command from 2008 to 2010. Soe Win has been accused of accepting bribes from companies dealing in jade, timber, and gold, in exchange for concessions from the profits. Soe Win was reported to have accepted a 150 million kyat ($149,254 USD) bribe from teak businessmen from China's Yunnan province, in exchange for allowing illicit teak trade on the China–Myanmar border. In March 2010, he ordered Tatmadaw soldiers in Hpakant, Kachin State, to collect military taxes from local jade mining companies.

== Sanctions ==
The United States Department of the Treasury imposed sanctions on Soe Win on 10 December 2019, under Executive Order 13818, which builds upon and implements the Magnitsky Act and targets perpetrators of serious human rights abuse and corruption. The U.S. government said Soe Win has committed serious human rights abuses against members of ethnic minority groups in Myanmar. The sanctions include a freezing of U.S. assets and a ban on transactions with any U.S. person.

Following the 2021 coup, on 11 February, he was also placed on the sanctions list of the Office of Foreign Assets Control (OFAC) under Executive Order 14014. The Government of Canada imposed sanctions on 18 February, under the Special Economic Measures Act and Special Economic Measures (Burma) Regulations, in response to the humanitarian and human rights situation in Myanmar. The sanctions include a freezing of assets in Canada and a ban on transactions with any Canadian citizen.

The Council of the European Union sanctioned him on 22 March 2021, under Council Regulation (E.U.) 2021/479 and Council Implementing Regulation (E.U.) 2021/480 which amended Council Regulation (E.U.) No 401/2013, for his responsibility for the military coup and the subsequent repression against peaceful demonstrators. As a result of the sanctions, he is prohibited from entry to any member state of the E.U.

== Personal life ==
Soe Win is married to Than Than Nwe (b. 1954). They have two children.
