= Ye Win Oo =

Burmese military officer (born 1966)

General Ye Win Oo
- ရဲဝင်းဦး
- Ye Win Oo in Nay Pyi Taw.

Commander-in-Chief of Defence Services
- Incumbent
- Assumed office 30 March 2026
- President: Min Aung Hlaing
- Deputy: Kyaw Swar Lin
- Preceded by: Min Aung Hlaing

Commander-in-Chief of Myanmar Army
- In office 4 March 2026 – 30 March 2026
- Appointed by: Min Aung Hlaing
- Preceded by: Soe Win
- Succeeded by: Kyaw Swar Lin
Other military positions held
Joint Chief Executive of the National Defence and Security Council
In office 31 July 2025 – 10 April 2026 Serving with Aung Lin Dwe
| Appointed by | Min Aung Hlaing |
| Preceded by | Position established |
| Succeeded by | Position abolished |
Secretary of the State Security and Peace Commission
In office 31 July 2025 – 10 April 2026
| Chairman | Min Aung Hlaing |
| Preceded by | Office established |
| Succeeded by | Office abolished |
Secretary of the State Administration Council
In office 2 February 2021 – 31 July 2025
| Chairman | Min Aung Hlaing |
| Preceded by | Office established |
| Succeeded by | Office abolished |
Chief of Military Security Affairs
In office 10 February 2020 – 4 March 2026
| Appointed by | Min Aung Hlaing |
| Preceded by | Soe Htut |
| Succeeded by | Vacant |
Commander of the Southwestern Regional Command
In office 18 June 2018 – 10 February 2020
| Preceded by | Tayza Kyaw |
| Succeeded by | Nyunt Win Swe |
Principal of the Defence Services Medical Academy
In office 26 August 2016 – 18 June 2018
| Preceded by | Thet Pong |
| Succeeded by | Nyunt Win Swe |

Personal details
- Born: 21 February 1966 (age 60) Burma (now Myanmar)
- Spouse: Nilar
- Children: 2
- Education: Officers Training School, Bahtoo

Military service
- Allegiance: Myanmar
- Branch/service: Tatmadaw; Myanmar Army
- Years of service: 1989–present
- Rank: General
- Battles/wars: Myanmar conflict; 2021 Myanmar coup d'état; Myanmar civil war (2021–present)

Ye Win Oo (Note: Burmese: ရဲဝင်းဦး, romanized: Rell Wainn U) (born 21 February 1966) is a Burmese armed general and military officer who has served as Commander-in-Chief of Defence Services since March 2026. Prior to that, he briefly served as Commander-in-Chief of Myanmar Army, Chief of Military Security Affairs from 2020 to 2026, Secretary of the State Administration Council from 2021 to 2025, and then the State Security and Peace Commission since 2025, and also held other various military posts under the leadership of Min Aung Hlaing between 2016 and 2026.

He concurrently serves as the Joint Chief Executive of the newly established Office of the National Defence and Security Council and served as joint secretary of the State Security and Peace Commission (SSPC). He was appointed as Joint Secretary of the SAC on 2 February 2021, in the aftermath of the 2021 Myanmar coup d'état.

== Early life and education ==
Ye Win Oo was born on 21 February 1966. He graduated from the Officers Training School, Bahtoo in 1989 as part of the 77th intake.

== Military career ==
From 2018 to 2020, he served as the commander of the Southwestern Command, which encompasses Ayeyarwady Region.

== Sanctions ==
The U.S. Department of the Treasury has imposed sanctions on Ye Win Oo since 11 February 2021, pursuant to Executive Order 14014, in response to the Burmese military’s coup against the democratically elected civilian government of Burma. The US sanctions include freezing of assets under the US and a ban on transactions with US persons.

The Government of Canada has imposed sanctions on him since 18 February 2021, pursuant to the Special Economic Measures Act and the Special Economic Measures (Burma) Regulations, in response to the gravity of the human rights and humanitarian situation in Myanmar (formerly Burma). Canadian sanctions include freezing of assets under Canada and a ban on transactions with Canadian persons.

HM Treasury and the Foreign, Commonwealth and Development Office of the United Kingdom have imposed sanctions on him since 25 February 2021, for his responsibility for serious human rights violations in Burma. The UK sanctions include freezing of assets under the UK and a ban on traveling or transiting to the UK.

Furthermore, the Council of the European Union has imposed sanctions on him since 22 March 2021, pursuant to Council Regulation (EU) 2021/479 and Council Implementing Regulation (EU) 2021/480, which amended Council Regulation (EU) No 401/2013, for his responsibility for the military coup and the subsequent military and police repression against peaceful demonstrators. The EU sanctions include freezing of assets under member countries of the EU and a ban on traveling or transiting to those countries.

== Personal life ==
Ye Win Oo is married to Daw Nilar (b. 1968), and has one daughter, Theit Thinzar Ye (b. 1997).

== See also ==
- State Administration Council
- Tatmadaw

== Notes ==
Military offices
| Preceded by Min Aung Hlaing | Commander-in-Chief of Defence Services; 2026-present | Incumbent |
Political offices
| Preceded by Position established | Joint Chief Executive of Office of the National Defence and Security Council; 2025-present | Incumbent |
| New office | Joint Secretary of the State Security and Peace Commission; 2025–present | Incumbent |
