= Kawmein Pagoda =

- Location within Myanmar

Religion
- Affiliation: Buddhism
- Sect: Theravada
- Ecclesiastical or organisational status: Pagoda
- Status: Active

Location
- Location: Myitkyina, Kachin State
- Country: Myanmar
- Coordinates: 25°23′07″N 97°23′37″E

Architecture
- Completed: 2010

Kawmein Pagoda is a pagoda in Myitkyina, Myanmar. It is also known as Myoti Pagoda. In July 2010, Vice-Senior General Maung Aye, and his wife Daw Mya Mya San attended the ceremony at the pagoda to hoist diamond orbs.
