= Ye Aung =

Burmese soldier

- ရဲအောင်

Minister for Border Affairs
- Incumbent
- Assumed office 30 March 2016 - 1 February 2021
- President: Htin Kyaw; Myint Swe (acting); Win Myint

Personal details
- Born: 8 June 1960 (age 65) Chauk, Burma
- Spouse: Khaing May Kyu
- Children: Thu Sit Aung; Thu Yan Nyein
- Occupation: Soldier

Military service
- Branch/service: Myanmar Army
- Rank: Lieutenant General

Ye Aung (Burmese: ရဲအောင်; born 8 June 1960) is a Burmese military officer who served as Minister for Border Affairs of Myanmar from 2018 to 2021 and sits on the National Defence and Security Council.

== Early life and education ==
Ye Aung was born on 8 June 1960 in Chauk, Magwe Division, Burma (now Myanmar) to Ba Saw and Khin Kyi.

== Career ==
Ye Aung graduated from the 23rd intake of the Defence Services Academy with a Bachelor's and master's degree in defence. He previously served as a military judicial advocate, and holds the rank of Lieutenant General

== Personal life ==
He married Khaing May Kyu, and has two sons, Thu Sit Aung and Thu Yan Nyein.
