= Union Consultative Council =

Myanmar statutory government body

- ပြည်ထောင်စုအတိုင်ပင်ခံကောင်စီ

Agency overview
- Formed: 10 April 2026
- Jurisdiction: Government of Myanmar
- Agency executives: Soe Win, Chairperson; Maung Maung Aye, Secretary

The Union Consultative Council (UCC) is a statutory government body in Myanmar formed in 2026, following the conclusion of the 2025-26 Myanmar general election.

== History ==
The formation of the Union Consultative Council was formally proposed on 3 February 2026, after the conclusion of the 2025–26 Myanmar general election. Acting president Min Aung Hlaing signed the Union Consultative Council Law on that day.

== Composition ==
According to the 2026 Union Consultative Council Law, the council is formed by the president of Myanmar, who must appoint a minimum of five members, including a chairperson and secretary. The term of the council is concurrent with the five-year term of the president.

== Powers and duties ==
According to the law, the UCC can advise and coordinate on matters related to national security, international relations, peace processes and legislation, without affecting executive or judicial powers. The Office of the President is tasked with arranging the work of the UCC and the issuing the necessary bylaws, orders, notifications and instructions to expedite implementation of the Union Consultative Council Law.

== Members ==
On 10 April 2026, Min Aung Hlaing issued the formation of 11-members council, chaired by former Deputy Commander-in-Chief of Defence Services Soe Win.

No	Name	Position
1	Soe Win	Chairperson
2	Maung Maung Aye	Secretary
3	Than Swe	Member
4	Ko Ko Hlaing	Member
5	Moe Aung	Member
6	Dr Yin Yin Nwe	Member
7	Dr Cho Cho Kyaw Nyein	Member
8	Ko Ko Gyi	Member
9	Mahn Nyein Maung	Member
10	Dwe Bu	Member
11	Zaw Aye Maung	Member
