= Saw Kyar Doe =

Karen military officer

- Died: January 12, 1999
- Service years: 1948
- Rank: Chief of Army Staff

Brigadier General Saw Kyar Doe was a Karen military officer who served as the first deputy Chief of Army Staff from 4 January 1948 to 31 July 1948.

== Career ==
In 1924, at the age of 16, he joined the army, attended training in Maymyo, and served in the 2nd Burma Rifle in Taiping, Malaysia. He served as a jamadar in the Burmese and Indian armies. In 1930, he attended the Royal Military Academy Sandhurst in England, and received a King's Commission in 1932. In 1938, he returned to Burma and served as deputy commander in the Burma Military Police with the rank of captain. Before Japanese troops entered Burma in 1939, the Burma Military Police and Civil Police merged to form the 7th Burma Rifle Police Battalion, where he served as a lieutenant commander (major).

During the World War II, he served as a colonel in the Burmese Defense Army (BDA) under the command of General Aung San. During the Japanese Revolution, he was assigned as the military leader of Division No. 3.

In 1945, before the start of the March Revolution, he was captured by the Japanese army in Wakema, and was taken to Mawlamyine. He was released after World War II.

After the war, he returned to serve as a deputy battalion commander at the Burma Regimental Center which was opened in Maymyo. He was promoted to the rank of Brigadier General in 1947.

In April 1948, he was assigned as the commander of the Southern Regional Command. From January to July 1948, he served as the deputy Chief of Army Staff. He was replaced with General Ne Win in August 1948. So he moved to the post of Chief of Operations but was forced to retire when Karen insurgents began their war for independence from Burma. Burman-led government forces and Karens engaged in a fierce fight in Rangoon's Insein Township in January 1949. The battle was known as the Battle of Insein. As a result, Burma leaders no longer trusted the Karen, and high-ranking Karen general Smith Dun and his fellow Karen troops were removed from their positions.

On 11 September 1988, he served as a member of the Democracy General Election Commission. He was awarded the title of Maha Thiri Thudhamma and the Naingngan Gonyi (First Class) by the government. He died on January 12, 1999, at his home in Kamayut Township. He was survived by his wife, Than Yin, and his son, Nay Htate Doe.
