= Khin Aung Myint (general) =

Commander-in-Chief of Myanmar Air Force

His Excellency General Khin Aung Myint
- ခင်အောင်မြင့်

Commander-in-Chief of Myanmar Air Force
- In office 2013–2018
- Succeeded by: General Maung Maung Kyaw

Chief of General Staff of the Myanmar Armed Forces
- In office 2015 – 26 August 2016
- Preceded by: General Hla Htay Win
- Succeeded by: General Mya Tun Oo

Personal details
- Born: Myanmar (Burma)
- Citizenship: Burmese
- Occupation: Air force officer

Military service
- Allegiance: Myanmar
- Branch/service: Myanmar Air Force
- Years of service: 2013–2018
- Rank: General

Khin Aung Myint (Burmese: ခင်အောင်မြင့်pronounced [kʰɪ̀ɴ ʔàʊɴ mjɪ̄ɴ]; born Myanmar) is a retired Burmese air force officer who was the Commander-in-Chief of the Myanmar Air Force from 2013 to 2018. During his tenure, he also held the position of Chief of the General Staff of the Myanmar Armed Forces, overseeing coordination among the army, navy, and air force branches.

== Military career ==
Khin Aung Myint rose through the ranks of the Myanmar Air Force, eventually being appointed as Commander-in-Chief in 2013. Under his leadership, the air force focused on modernization efforts, acquisition of new aircraft, and strengthening Myanmar’s air defense capabilities. He served in this role until his retirement in 2018.

In August 2017, Khin Aung Myint made an official visit to India, meeting Indian Air Force head Birender Singh Dhanoa, to strengthen military cooperation between the two countries.

Throughout his career, Khin Aung Myint was known for maintaining strong ties with the military leadership and supporting the State Administration Council’s policies.
