= Mya Tun Oo =

Burmese military officer (born 1961)

His Excellency General (Rtd.) Mya Tun Oo
- မြထွန်းဦး
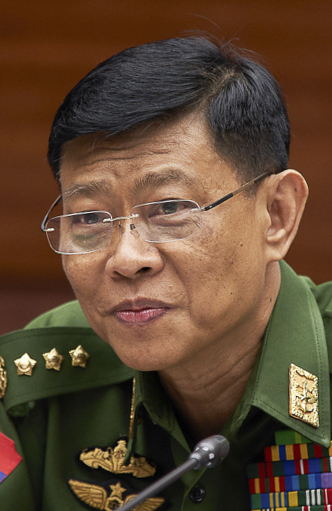
- Mya Tun Oo in 2020

Union Minister for Transport
- Incumbent
- Assumed office 10 April 2026
- President: Min Aung Hlaing
- Preceded by: Himself (as Transport & Communications)

Union Minister for Digital Development and Communications
- In office 10 April 2026 – 15 October 2026
- President: Min Aung Hlaing
- Preceded by: Himself (as Transport & Communications)
- Succeeded by: Htun Aung

Member of the Pyithu Hluttaw
- In office 16 March 2026 – 10 April 2026
- Constituency: Pyinoolwin, Mandalay

Union Minister for Transport and Communications
- In office 3 August 2023 – 10 April 2026
- Prime Minister: Min Aung Hlaing; Nyo Saw
- Preceded by: Tin Aung San
- Succeeded by: Ministry dissolved

Deputy Prime Minister of Myanmar
- In office 1 February 2023 – 31 July 2025 Serving with Soe Win, Tin Aung San, Win Shein, and Than Swe
- Prime Minister: Min Aung Hlaing

Union Minister for Defense
- In office 1 February 2021 – 3 August 2023
- Preceded by: Sein Win
- Succeeded by: Tin Aung San

Member of the State Administration Council
- In office 2 February 2021 – 31 July 2025
- Leader: Min Aung Hlaing

Chief of the General Staff (Army, Navy and Air)
- In office 26 August 2016 – 1 February 2021
- Preceded by: Khin Aung Myint
- Succeeded by: Maung Maung Aye

Personal details
- Born: 5 May 1961 (age 65) Seikgyi Village, Yangon, Myanmar (formerly Burma)
- Citizenship: Burmese
- Party: Union Solidarity and Development
- Spouse: Thet Thet Aung
- Education: Defence Services Academy
- Cabinet: Min Aung Hlaing's military cabinet Nyo Saw's cabinet Second Min Aung Hlaing cabinet

Military service
- Allegiance: Tatmadaw
- Branch/service: Myanmar Army
- Years of service: 1980–2026
- Rank: General
- Battles/wars: Myanmar conflict; 2021 Myanmar coup d'état; Myanmar civil war (2021–present)

Mya Tun Oo (Burmese: မြထွန်းဦး; pronounced [mja̰ tʰʊ́ɴ ʔú]; born 5 May 1961) is a Myanmar politician and retired military officer who currently serves as the Union Minister for Transport since April 2026. He was elected as a member of the Pyithu Hluttaw in 2025-26 general election.

From 2021 to 2026, he served as Union Minister for Transport and Communications of Myanmar, Union Minister of Defence and member of the State Administration Council (SAC) from 2021-2025. He was also a Deputy Prime Minister from February 2023 to July 2025.

== Early life and education ==
Mya Tun Oo was born on 5 May 1961 in Seikgyi Village, Yangon, Myanmar (formerly Burma). He graduated from the 25th Cadet Course at the Defence Services Academy in 1980.

== Military career ==
Mya Tun Oo's rapid rise through the armed forces was noted by political observers, known for his professional record in both field combat and staff roles. By 2010, he was promoted to the rank of brigadier-general, serving as the rector of the Defence Services Academy, his alma mater. From 2011 to 2012, he served as the commander of the Eastern Central Command, which encompasses central Shan State. In 2012, he was promoted to the rank of major general, serving as the army's Chief of Staff, Chief of Military Security Affairs, and Chief of the Bureau of Special Operations 6. From 2015 to 2017, he headed the Bureau of Operations - 5, which includes the Naypyidaw and Western Commands. On 26 August 2016, he was promoted to the rank of general, and made the Chief of the General Staff (Army, Navy and Air). After years of speculation, he was appointed by the Commander-in-Chief of Defence Services as the Union Minister for Defence on 1 February 2021. On the following day (2 February 2021), he was appointed a member of the State Administration Council by the Commander-in-Chief of Defence Services.

== Political career ==
Mya Tun Oo ran and was elected as the Union Solidarity and Development Party candidate for Pyithu Hluttaw in Pyinoolwin Township, Mandalay Region, in the 2025–26 Myanmar general election, considered a sham process by independent observers.

== Sanctions ==
The U.S. Department of the Treasury has imposed sanctions on Mya Tun Oo since 11 February 2021, pursuant to Executive Order 14014, in response to the Burmese military's coup against the democratically elected civilian government of Burma. The US sanctions include a freezing of any assets in the US and a ban on transactions with US individuals.

The Government of Canada has also imposed sanctions on him since 18 February 2021, pursuant to Special Economic Measures Act and Special Economic Measures (Burma) Regulations, in response to the gravity of the human rights and humanitarian situation in Myanmar (formerly Burma). Canadian sanctions include freezing potential assets in Canada and a ban on transactions with Canadian individuals.

HM Treasury and the Foreign, Commonwealth and Development Office of United Kingdom have also imposed sanctions on him since 18 February 2021, for his responsibility for serious human rights violations in Burma. The UK sanctions include freezing potential assets held in the UK and a ban on traveling or transiting to the UK.

Furthermore, the Council of the European Union has imposed sanctions on him since 22 March 2021, pursuant to Council Regulation (EU) 2021/479 and Council Implementing Regulation (EU) 2021/480 which amended Council Regulation (EU) No 401/2013, for his responsibility for the military coup and the subsequent military and police repression against peaceful demonstrators. The EU sanctions include freezing of assets under member countries of the EU and ban on traveling or transiting to the countries.

== Personal life ==
Mya Tun Oo is married to Thet Thet Aung.

== See also ==
- List of cabinet members of State Administration Council
- Ministry of Defence (Myanmar)
- Cabinet of Myanmar
