= Htun Aung =

Commander-in-Chief of the Myanmar Air Force and Burmese air force officer

His Excellency; General; Zayya Kyawhtin; Htun Aung
- ထွန်းအောင်
- General Htun Aung at the Xiangshan forum in Beijing

Union Minister for Defence
- In office 10 April 2026 – 15 October 2026
- President: Min Aung Hlaing
- Preceded by: Maung Maung Aye
- Succeeded by: Yar Pyae

Commander-in-Chief of the Myanmar Air Force
- In office 12 January 2022 – 10 April 2026
- Appointed by: Min Aung Hlaing; Ye Win Oo
- Preceded by: Maung Maung Kyaw
- Succeeded by: Lt Gen Tun Win

Union Minister for Digital Development and Communications
- Incumbent
- Assumed office 15 October 2026
- Appointed by: Min Aung Hlaing
- Preceded by: Mya Tun Oo

Personal details
- Born: 1967 (age 58–59) Burma (now Myanmar)
- Education: Defence Services Academy

Military service
- Allegiance: Myanmar
- Branch/service: Myanmar Air Force
- Rank: General
- Battles/wars: Internal conflict in Myanmar: Myanmar civil war (2021–present)

Htun Aung (Burmese: ထွန်းအောင်; pronounced [tʰʊ̀n àʊɴ]; born 1967), also spelled Tun Aung, is a Myanmar Air Force officer who has served as the Union Minister for Digital Development and Communications since October of 2026 and formerly served as the Union Minister for Defence. A member of the Tatmadaw, he previously served as Commander-in-Chief of the Myanmar Air Force from 2022 to 2026.

== Military career ==
Htun Aung graduated from the 29th batch of the Defence Services Academy. In 2020, he sat on the Board of Directors of Myanma Economic Holdings Limited (MEHL), a military-owned conglomerate.

On 12 January 2022, Htun Aung was appointed as the Commander-in-Chief of the Myanmar Air Force, succeeding Maung Maung Kyaw, who was forced to retire from the military. Prior to his promotion, he served as Maung Maung Kyaw's Chief of Staff.

In the aftermath of the 2021 Myanmar coup d'état, the Tatmadaw launched airstrikes against anti-regime resistance forces and civilians. On 30 June 2022, under Htun Aung's command, a Myanmar fighter jet violated Thai airspace after flying 4–5 kilometres (2.5–3.1 mi) into Phop Phra district in Thailand's Tak province. Htun Aung subsequently issued an apology to his Thai counterpart, Napadej Dhupatemiya. The governments of the European Union, Canada, the United States and the United Kingdom have sanctioned Htun Aung for human rights violations.

== Personal life and controversies ==
Htun Aung has one son reportedly named Chan Nyein. His name has appeared in various reports related to financial assets connected to his father. According to some accounts and Justice For Myanmar, a number of properties and investments were registered under his name, a practice believed to have been used to bypass international sanctions placed on members of the military leadership. Between 2019 and 2022, Chan Nyein made several public appearances with Aung Pyae Sone, the son of Myanmar's President and former Commander-in-Chief of Defence Services, Min Aung Hlaing.

In 2022, Chan Nyein was also involved in a widely discussed incident at a restaurant in Nay Pyi Taw. During a gathering with several associates, a dispute occurred between his group and another group of patrons. The confrontation reportedly escalated after a verbal exchange. Following the incident, the other group was detained by security forces on criminal charges. Critics and observers later questioned the circumstances of the arrests and suggested that political connections may have influenced the outcome.

The incident received public attention and was cited in discussions about the influence of military elites and their families within the country’s legal and political systems.

== See also ==
- 2021–2023 Myanmar civil war
- State Administration Council
- Tatmadaw
- Myanmar Army
- Myanmar Air Force
- Myanmar Navy
