= Maung Maung Aye =

Burmese army general and Deputy Prime Minister of Myanmar since 2024

His Excellency General Maung Maung Aye
- မောင်မောင်အေး
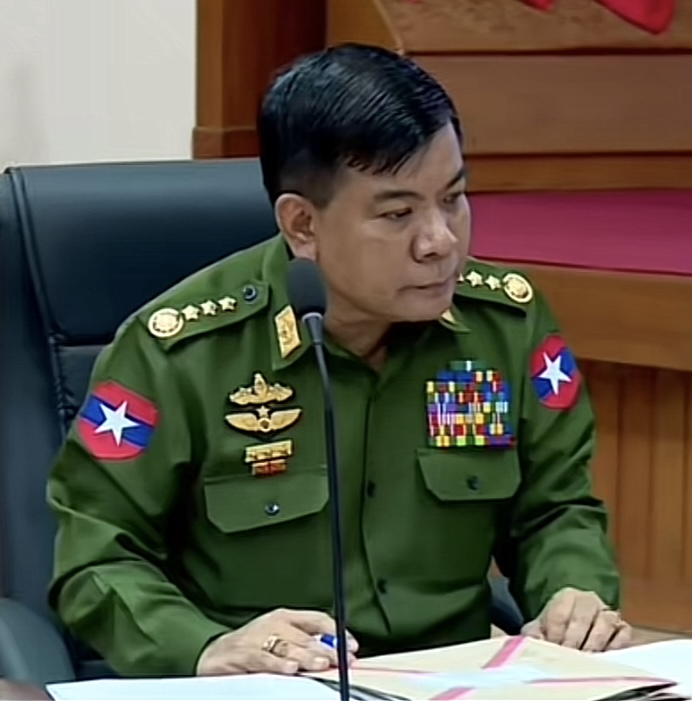
- Maung Maung Aye in 2024

Secretary of the Union Consultative Council
- Incumbent
- Assumed office 10 April 2026
- Appointed by: Min Aung Hlaing
- Chairperson: Soe Win
- Preceded by: Office established
Other positions held
Union Minister for Defence
In office 18 December 2024 – 10 April 2026
President	Min Aung Hlaing (acting)
Prime Minister	Min Aung Hlaing; Nyo Saw
Preceded by	Tin Aung San
Succeeded by	Htun Aung
Deputy Prime Minister of Myanmar
In office 18 December 2024 – 31 July 2025 Serving with Soe Win, Mya Tun Oo, Tin Aung San, Than Swe, Win Shein
Prime Minister	Min Aung Hlaing
Preceded by	Tin Aung San
Succeeded by	Office abolished
Chief of the General Staff (Army, Navy and Air)
In office 1 February 2021 – 18 December 2024
Preceded by	Mya Tun Oo
Succeeded by	Kyaw Swar Lin
Member of the State Security and Peace Commission
In office 31 July 2025 – 10 April 2026
Member of the State Administration Council
In office 25 September 2021 – 31 July 2025

Personal details
- Born: 1962 (age 63–64) Thanlyin, Myanmar (formerly Burma)
- Education: Defence Services Academy

Military service
- Allegiance: Myanmar
- Branch/service: Tatmadaw; Myanmar Army
- Years of service: 1980–present
- Rank: General

Maung Maung Aye (Burmese: မောင်မောင်အေး; pronounced [maʊɰ̃ maʊɰ̃ʔ]; born 1962) is a Myanmar Army general who currently serves as the Secretary of the Union Consultative Council (UCC). He formerly served as a member of the State Administration Council and as Chief of the General Staff (Army, Navy and Air). He was appointed as Deputy Prime Minister of Myanmar and Union Minister for Defence on 18 December 2024. He no longer serves in any of his roles except for the role of Secretary of the UCC.

== Early life and education ==
Maung Maung Aye was born in 1962 in Thanlyin, Burma (now Myanmar). He joined the Myanmar Armed Forces in the 1980s, and he enrolled at the Defence Services Academy (DSA) in Pyin Oo Lwin.

== Military career ==
Maung Maung Aye’s military career began in the early 1980s. He was appointed to the Naypyidaw Regional Military Command under the rank of brigadier general in August 2010,and continued to serve there at least until 27 March 2015. At some point of time, he was appointed to the rank of major general on 3 September 2011.

He was promoted to the rank of lieutenant general and became Chief of Armed Forces Training in August 2015, until 4 February 2021, after the 2021 Myanmar coup d'etat. After that he was appointed to Joint Chief of Staff on 4 February 2021 with the same military rank.

He was appointed to the rank of general on 24 March 2021 and served with the same position, until 27 September 2023.

He became a member of the State Administration Council (SAC), lately after the 2021 Myanmar coup d'etat. He was appointed to the high-ranking positions of Deputy Prime Minister and Union Minister of Defence under Section 419 of the Constitution of Myanmar on 18 December 2024. He was also the former Chief of General Staff for the army, navy, and air force until December 2024.

== Sanctions ==
Maung Maung Aye was sanctioned by Canada and the European Union for his involvement in the 2021 Myanmar coup d'etat. He is being designated pursuant to E.O. 14014 for his direct involvement with the military and holding the high-ranking senior ranks and positions within the institution.
