= Kyaw Swe (minister) =

Burmese politician

His Excellency Lieutenant General Kyaw Swe
- ကျော်ဆွေ
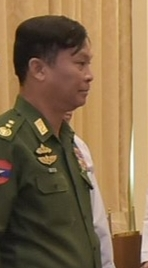
- Kyaw Swe in 2017

Minister of Home Affairs
- In office 30 March 2016 – 4 February 2020
- President: Htin Kyaw; Myint Swe (acting); Win Myint
- Preceded by: Ko Ko
- Succeeded by: Soe Htut

Minister of Border Affairs
- In office 2015 – 30 March 2016
- President: Thein Sein
- Preceded by: Thet Naing Win
- Succeeded by: Ye Aung

Military service
- Allegiance: Myanmar
- Branch/service: Myanmar Army
- Rank: Lieutenant General

Lt. General Kyaw Swe (Burmese: ကျော်ဆွေ, pronounced [tɕɔ̀ sʰwè]) is the former Minister of Home Affairs of Myanmar, in office from 2016 to 2020. Previously, he served as Commander of South-west Command in Pathein, Ayeyarwady Region.

== Early life and education ==
Kyaw Swe was born on 27 November 1959 to Mya Soe and Daw Kyi in Thepyintaw, Kyaukpadaung Township, Mandalay Division (now Mandalay Region, Myanmar).

== Controversy ==
In 2017, after the assassination of Ko Ni, a prominent constitutional lawyer and Burmese Muslim, allegations emerged that Kyaw Swe had orchestrated the killing. The assistant secretary of the Home Affairs Ministry, Maung Maung Myint, issued a statement on 1 February 2017, denying the allegations. It was later found that the masterminds of the killing were orchestrated by Kyi Lin and Aung Win Zaw, who received the death sentence.
