= Deputy Commander-in-Chief of Defence Services =

Second highest military appointment in Myanmar

- ဒုတိယတပ်မတော်ကာကွယ်ရေးဦးစီးချုပ် (Burmese)
- Flag of the Deputy Commander-in-Chief of Defence Services

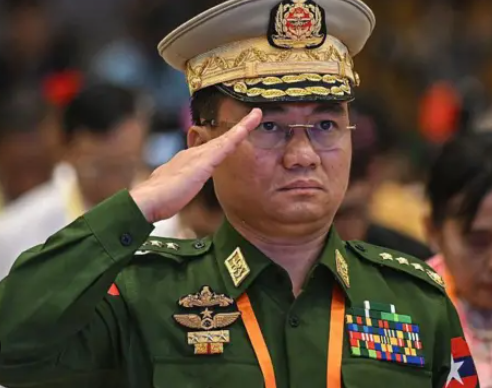
- Incumbent; General Kyaw Swar Lin since 30 March 2026
- Office of the Commander-in-Chief (Army)
- Member of: National Defence and Security Council
- Reports to: Commander-in-Chief of Defence Services
- Residence: Naypyidaw
- Appointer: Military Appointments General
- Precursor: Deputy Inspector General, Burma Army
- Formation: 1947 (as DGOC); 1989 (as DC-in-CDS,C-in-C(Army))
- First holder: Smith Dun (as DGOC); Than Shwe (as DC-in-CDS,C-in-C(Army))
- Unofficial names: ဒုကာချုပ်၊ ဒုချုပ်

The Deputy Commander-in-Chief of Defence Services (Burmese: ဒုတိယတပ်မတော်ကာကွယ်ရေးဦးစီးချုပ်) is the second-highest military appointment in the Tatmadaw, the unified armed forces of Myanmar, also known in English as the "Defence Services". After the unification of Myanmar's Army, Navy, and Air Force in 1955, the Tatmadaw used the Chief of Staff system, with the three branches of the armed forces led by the Vice Chief of Staff (Army), Vice Chief of Staff (Navy), and Vice Chief of Staff (Air). In 1989, this was reorganized into the current system, under which each branch is led by its own Commander-in-Chief. Since then, except in the special case of a 26-day period in 2026, the positions of the Deputy Commander-in-Chief of Defence Services and Commander-in-Chief (Army) have been traditionally combined and only one officer is appointed at a time. (Note: Official documentations show only one list of "Deputy Commander-in-Chief of Defence Services, Commander-in-Chief (Army)" and notably, the 26-day appointment of separate Commander-in-Chief (Army), in 4 – 30 March 2026, is not included in the list.)

== List of DGOC/ VCS/ DC-in-CDS ==
(Dates in italics indicate de facto continuation of office)

No.	Portrait	Name (Birth–Death)	Term of office			Notes	Ref.
No.	Portrait	Name (Birth–Death)	Took office	Left office	Time in office	Notes	Ref.
Deputy General Officer Commanding, Burma Army
*		Colonel; Smith Dun (1906–1979)	1 May 1947	4 January 1948	248 days	His appointment as DGOC is recorded in the military's official history but he is not acknowledged as the first person in the official list of VCS/DC-in-CDS,C-in-C(Army). Later became the first military chief of independent Burma as GOC	
*		Brigadier General; Saw Kyar Doe (1908–1999)	14 April 1948	30 July 1949	1 year, 107 days	Ethnic Karen Officer, then named "Deputy General Officer Commanding". Saw Kyar Doe moved to the post of Chief of Operation but forced to retire due to civil war with Karen. Listed as the first VCS/C-in-CDS,C-in-C(Army) in the official list even though he had retired before 1955	
*		Major General; Ne Win (1910–2002)	1 August 1948	1 February 1949	184 days	Listed in the official list of VCS/DC-in-CDS,C-in-C(Army) even though his term of office was before 1955. Promoted to GOC in 1949; subsequently became the first Chief of Staff of the unified Tatmadaw, the Defence Services, in 1955	
Vice Chief of Staff, Defence Services (Army)			28 September 1955	10 May 1989	33 years, 224 days	The three Vice Chiefs of Staff from Army, Navy and Air branches enjoyed equal status as deputies to the Chief of Staff, Defence Services	
Vice Chief of Staff, Defence Services (Navy)			28 September 1955	10 May 1989	33 years, 224 days	The three Vice Chiefs of Staff from Army, Navy and Air branches enjoyed equal status as deputies to the Chief of Staff, Defence Services	
Vice Chief of Staff, Defence Services (Air)			28 September 1955	10 May 1989	33 years, 224 days	The three Vice Chiefs of Staff from Army, Navy and Air branches enjoyed equal status as deputies to the Chief of Staff, Defence Services	
Deputy Commander-in-Chief of Defence Services							
1		General; Than Shwe (born 1933)	10 May 1989	23 April 1992	2 years, 349 days	Previously titled Vice Chief of Staff (Army). Later promoted to the Commander-in-Chief of Defence Services	
2		Vice-Senior General; Maung Aye (born 1937)	24 April 1992	30 March 2011	18 years, 340 days		
3		Vice-Senior General; Soe Win (born 1961)	30 March 2011	30 March 2026	15 years	Transferred the CinC(Army) position to Ye Win Oo on 4 March 2026; remained as DCinCDS after that	
4		General; Kyaw Swar Lin (born 1971)	30 March 2011	Incumbent	15 years, 194 days		

== Existing positions named C-in-C and CS ==
1. Commander-in-Chief of Defence Services
2. Deputy Commander-in-Chief of Defence Services
3. Commander-in-Chief (Army)
4. Chief of the General Staff (Army, Navy and Air)
5. Commander-in-Chief (Navy)
6. Commander-in-Chief (Air)
- 7.
  - Chief of Staff (Army)
  - Chief of Staff (Navy)
  - Chief of Staff (Air)
