= Maung Maung Kyaw =

Commander-in-chief of Myanmar Air Force

General Maung Maung Kyaw
- မောင်မောင်ကျော်
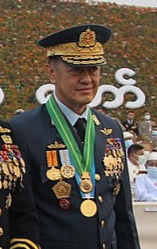
- Maung Maung Kyaw in 2021

Member of the State Administration Council
- In office 2 February 2021 – 1 February 2023
- Leader: Min Aung Hlaing

Commander-in-Chief of the Myanmar Air Force
- In office 2 January 2018 – 10 January 2022
- Preceded by: Khin Aung Myint
- Succeeded by: Htun Aung

Personal details
- Born: 23 July 1964 (age 62) Union of Burma (now Myanmar)
- Spouse: Aung Mar Myint
- Children: 2
- Parent: Kyaw Htin (father)
- Education: Defence Services Academy

Military service
- Allegiance: Myanmar
- Branch/service: Myanmar Air Force
- Rank: General

Maung Maung Kyaw (Burmese: မောင်မောင်ကျော်, born 23 July 1964) is a Burmese military officer who served on Myanmar's State Administration Council from 2021 to 2023. He previously served as Commander-in-Chief of the Myanmar Air Force from 2018 to 2022.

== Early life and education ==
Maung Maung Kyaw was born on 23 July 1964. He graduated from the Defence Services Academy in 1985 as part of the 26th intake.

== Military career ==
Maung Maung Kyaw trained as a fighter pilot. He was promoted to Commander-in-Chief of the Myanmar Air Force on 2 January 2018, after his predecessor Khin Maung Myint reached the mandatory retirement age.

Subsequently, he was appointed as a members of the SAC on 2 February 2021, in the aftermath of the 2021 Myanmar coup d'état. He was forced to retire as Air Force Commander in January 2022. He still holds a position as member of SAC.

== Sanctions ==
The U.S. Department of the Treasury has imposed sanctions on "Maung Maung Kyaw" since 22 February 2021, pursuant to Executive Order 14014, for he is an official of the military or security forces of Burma and a member of the State Administration Council responsible for killing of peaceful protestors. The US sanctions include freezing of assets under the US and ban on transactions with US person.

The Government of Canada has imposed sanctions on him since 18 February 2021, pursuant to Special Economic Measures Act and Special Economic Measures (Burma) Regulations, in response to the gravity of the human rights and humanitarian situation in Myanmar (formerly Burma). Canadian sanctions include freezing of assets under Canada and ban on transactions with Canadian person.

The British Government placed sanctions on him on 25 February 2021, following the coup. The UK sanctions include freezing of assets under the UK and ban on traveling or transiting to the UK.

Furthermore, the Council of the European Union has imposed sanctions on him since 22 March 2021, pursuant to Council Regulation (EU) 2021/479 and Council Implementing Regulation (EU) 2021/480 which amended Council Regulation (EU) No 401/2013, for his responsibility for the military coup and the subsequent military and police repression against peaceful demonstrators. The EU sanctions include freezing of assets under member countries of the EU and ban on traveling or transiting to the countries.

== Personal life ==
Maung Maung Kyaw is the youngest son of General Thura Kyaw Htin. His elder brother Thant Kyaw is a former Deputy Minister of Foreign Affairs, while his elder sister Thida Myint co-owns LTR, an aviation supply business with operations in Myanmar and Singapore. Maung Maung Kyaw is married to Aung Mar Myint, and has two sons, Hein Htet (b. 1987) and Kaung Htet (b. 1992). Hein Htet, also known as Ivan Htet, and his wife Linn Latt Thiri co-founded a private firm to supply Myanmar's armed forces, and were the subjects of a 2021 Reuters exposé on the economic interests of Myanmar's military families.

== See also ==
- State Administration Council
- Tatmadaw
