= Commander-in-Chief of Defence Services =

Head of the Myanmar's military

- တပ်မတော်ကာကွယ်ရေးဦးစီးချုပ်
- Flag of the Commander-in-Chief of Defence Services

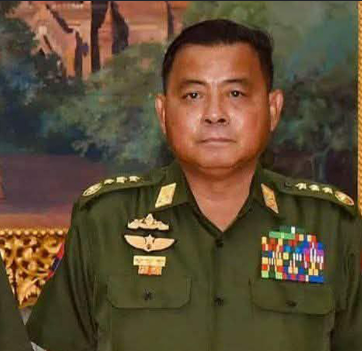
- Incumbent; General Ye Win Oo since 30 March 2026
- Office of the Commander-in-Chief of Defence Services
- Style: His Excellency
- Type: Supreme Commander
- Abbreviation: C-in-C DS
- Member of: National Defence and Security Council
- Seat: Naypyidaw, Myanmar
- Appointer: * Military Appointments General; State President (Note: Reconfirms the Commander-in-Chief Appointed by the Office of the Military Appointments General) with the advice of the National Defence and Security Council
- Precursor: Inspector General, Burma Army
- Formation: 1 May 1947 (as GOC); 10 May 1989 (as C-in-C DS)
- First holder: Major General Lechmere Thomas (as GOC); General Saw Maung (as C-in-C DS)
- Unofficial names: တပ်ချုပ်၊ ကာချုပ်
- Deputy: Deputy Commander-in-Chief of Defence Services
- Website: Official website

The Commander-in-Chief of Defence Services (Burmese: တပ်မတော်ကာကွယ်ရေးဦးစီးချုပ်, romanized: Tatmadaw Kakweyay Uzigyoke) is the supreme commander of the Tatmadaw and all armed forces in Myanmar according to the constitution. The Tatmadaw, officially translated as "Defence Services", is an independent branch of government under control of the commander-in-chief and not answerable to the president of Myanmar, though certain actions of the commander-in-chief require the approval of the National Defence and Security Council (NDSC), which is chaired by the president. According to the 2008 Constitution of Myanmar, the commander-in-chief is appointed by the president upon nomination by the NDSC; the commander-in-chief is also a member of the NDSC.

The Constitution frames the commander-in-chief as an expressly political office, stating he "participates in the national political leadership role of the state". Accordingly, he has expansive governance powers under the Constitution, including the ability to appoint the leadership of the Home, Border, and Defence ministries, the right to appoint 25% of the members of both houses of the Pyidaungsu Hluttaw (which appoints the president), the ability to initiate impeachment proceedings against the president, as well as having effective voting control on the NDSC. One of the most significant executive powers retained by the president is discretion in calling meetings of the NDSC. Article 418 of the 2008 Constitution allows the Commander-in-Chief broad authority over the government if the president declares a state of emergency in coordination with the NDSC. This happened after the 2021 coup d'état: military-installed acting president Myint Swe declared a state of emergency and transferred power to Commander-in-Chief, Senior General Min Aung Hlaing, who then formed a military junta—the State Administration Council.

The current Commander-in-Chief is General Ye Win Oo, since 30 March 2026.

== History ==
The position was created as "General Officer Commanding (GOC) Burma Army" (Burmese: ဗမာ့တပ်မတော်စစ်ဦးစီးချုပ်) on 1 May 1947.

After the establishment of the War Office in May 1948, the GOC was the head of the combined military forces of army, navy, and air force. For this broader authority, the term "Supreme Commander-in-Chief of All Armed Forces of the Union of Burma" (ပြည်ထောင်စုမြန်မာနိုင်ငံလက်နက်ကိုင်တပ်ပေါင်းစုံစစ်သေနာပတိချုပ်) was also used.

On 28 September 1955, with the unification of Burma Army (ဗမာ့တပ်မတော်; Bama Tatmadaw), Burma Navy (ဗမာ့ရေတပ်မတော်; Bama Ye Tatmadaw) and Burma Air Force (မြန်မာ့လေတပ်မတော်; Myanma Le Tatmadaw) into a single Tatmadaw or Defence Services, the position was renamed as "Chief of Staff, Defence Services" (ကာကွယ်ရေးဦးစီးချုပ်) and given all powers previously held by the GOC Burma Army, the CO Burma Navy, and the CO Burma Air Force.

On 10 May 1989, the position was further renamed as "Commander-in-Chief of Defence Services" (တပ်မတော်ကာကွယ်ရေးဦးစီးချုပ်) in 1989.

== List of GOC/CS/C-in-CDS ==
(Dates in italics indicate de facto continuation of office)

No.	Portrait	Name (Birth–Death)	Term of office			Notes	Ref.
No.	Portrait	Name (Birth–Death)	Took office	Left office	Time in office	Notes	Ref.
General Officer Commanding, Burma Army
*		Major-General; Lechmere Cay Thomas (1897–1981)	1 May 1947	4 January 1948	248 days	Previously served as Inspector General. His appointment as GOC is recorded in the military's official history but he is not acknowledged as the first person in the official list of CS/C-in-C DS.	
Supreme Commander-in-Chief of All Armed Forces of the Union of Burma; General Officer Commanding, Burma Army
1		Lieutenant General; Smith Dun (1906–1979)	4 January 1948	31 January 1949	1 year, 27 days	Ethnic Karen, forced to retire due to the Karen conflict. Listed as the first CS/C-in-C DS in the official list even though he had retired before 1955.	
2		General; Ne Win (1910–2002)	1 February 1949	28 September 1955	6 years, 239 days	Oversaw the unification of Burmese armed forces.	
Chief of Staff, Defence Services
(2)		General; Ne Win (1910–2002)	28 September 1955	20 April 1972	16 years, 205 days	Later became president and chairman of the Burma Socialist Programme Party (BSPP).	
3		General; San Yu (1910–2002)	20 April 1972	7 March 1974	1 year, 321 days	Later became president.	
4		General; Tin Oo (1927–2024)	8 March 1974	6 March 1976	1 year, 364 days	Later became vice-chairman of the National League for Democracy (NLD).	
5		General; Thura Kyaw Htin (1925–1996)	6 March 1976	4 November 1985	9 years, 243 days		
6		General; Saw Maung (1928–1997)	4 November 1985	10 May 1989	3 years, 187 days		
Commander-in-Chief of Defence Services
(6)		Senior General; Saw Maung (1928–1997)	10 May 1989	24 April 1992	2 years, 350 days		
7		Senior General; Than Shwe (born 1933)	24 April 1992	30 March 2011	18 years, 340 days		
8		Senior General; Min Aung Hlaing (born 1956)	30 March 2011	30 March 2026	15 years		
9		General; Ye Win Oo (born 1966)	30 March 2026	Incumbent	194 days		

== List of other historical C-in-C and IG ==
=== Supreme Commander-in-Chief of All Burmese Armed Forces ===
No.	Portrait	Name (Birth–Death)	Term of office			Notes	Ref.
No.	Portrait	Name (Birth–Death)	Took office	Left office	Time in office	Notes	Ref.
Head of the State; Supreme Commander-in-Chief of All Burmese Armed Forces
1		Ba Maw (1893–1977)	1 August 1943	19 August 1945	2 years, 18 days	The only civilian commander-in-chief of the military. The Head of the State was the Supreme Commander-in-Chief of Burmese Armed Forces according to the Constitution of Burma, 1943.	

=== Supreme Commander-in-Chief of PBF ===
No.	Portrait	Name (Birth–Death)	Term of office			Notes	Ref.
No.	Portrait	Name (Birth–Death)	Took office	Left office	Time in office	Notes	Ref.
Supreme Commander-in-Chief
1		Major General; Aung San (1915–1947)	27 March 1945	29 December 1945	277 days	Founder of modern Myanmar Army, leader of Thirty Comrades, father of pro-democracy leader Aung San Suu Kyi.	

=== Inspector General of the Burma Army ===
No.	Portrait	Name (Birth–Death)	Term of office			Notes	Ref.
No.	Portrait	Name (Birth–Death)	Took office	Left office	Time in office	Notes	Ref.
Inspector General, Burma Army
1		Major-General; Lechmere Cay Thomas (1897–1981)	29 August 1945	1 May 1947	1 year, 245 days	Became the General Officer Commanding, Burma Army, on 1 May 1947.	

== Existing positions named C-in-C and CS ==
1. Commander-in-Chief of Defence Services
2. Deputy Commander-in-Chief of Defence Services
3. Commander-in-Chief (Army)
4. Chief of the General Staff (Army, Navy and Air)
5. Commander-in-Chief (Navy)
6. Commander-in-Chief (Air)
- 7.
  - Chief of Staff (Army)
  - Chief of Staff (Navy)
  - Chief of Staff (Air)
