= Kyaw Swar Lin =

Burmese army general (born 1971)

General Kyaw Swa Linn
- ကျော်စွာလင်း
- Kyaw Swar Lin in 2025

Deputy Commander-in-Chief of Defence Services
- Incumbent
- Assumed office 30 March 2026
- Commander-in-Chief: Ye Win Oo
- Preceded by: Soe Win

Commander-in-Chief of Myanmar Army
- Incumbent
- Assumed office 30 March 2026
- Appointed by: Ye Win Oo
- Preceded by: Ye Win Oo

Chief of the General Staff of Army, Navy, Air
- In office 18 December 2024 – 30 March 2026
- Appointed by: Min Aung Hlaing
- Preceded by: Maung Maung Aye
- Succeeded by: Ko Ko Oo

Member of the State Security and Peace Commission
- In office 31 July 2025 – 10 April 2026
- Chairman: Min Aung Hlaing

Personal details
- Born: 1971 (age 54–55)
- Spouse: Nan Ku Ku
- Education: Defence Services Academy

Military service
- Allegiance: Myanmar
- Branch/service: Myanmar Army
- Rank: General

Kyaw Swar Lin (also spelt Kyaw Swa Lin, Burmese: ကျော်စွာလင်း) is a Burmese military general who is currently serving as Deputy Commander-in-Chief of Defense Services and Commander-in-Chief (Army). Previous to this, he was appointed as Chief of the General Staff (Army, Navy and Air).

He was a member of the State Security and Peace Commission.

== Early life and education ==
Born in 1971, Kyaw Swar Lin graduated from the 35th intake of the Defense Services Academy.

== Career ==
Kyaw Swar Lin served as a junior officer to Lieutenant-General Moe Myint Tun, commander of the Bureau of Special Operations. They served together on operations in Rakhine State prior to 2018. However, Kyaw Swar Lin came to prominence when he was appointed head of Tatmadaw's Mandalay-based Central Command, ranked as a Major General in 2018. In May 1971, he was the youngest person ever to be promoted to Lieutenant General within the Tatmadaw. He was also appointed quartermaster general, succeeding Lieutenant General Nyo Saw, who retired.

Kyaw Swar Lin runs the Myanmar Economic Corporation (MEC), and sits on Myanma Economic Holdings Limited’s patron group under Commander-in-Chief Min Aung Hlaing. He also manages the military budget, which has accounted for 13%-15% of the overall national budget every year since 2012.

=== Post-coup involvement ===
As the commander of the Myanmar military (or Tatmadaw)’s Central Command, he is accused of ordering soldiers to open fire on anti-regime protesters in Mandalay in February and March 2021. He was appointed to the State Security and Peace Commission upon its formation in 2025.

== Personal life ==
Kyaw Swar Lin is married to Nan Ku Ku, a medical doctor, and has a daughter. As of 2025, he was married to Khin May Soe.
