= Kyaw Htin =

Former commander-in-chief of the Myanmar Armed Forces

General Thura Kyaw Htin
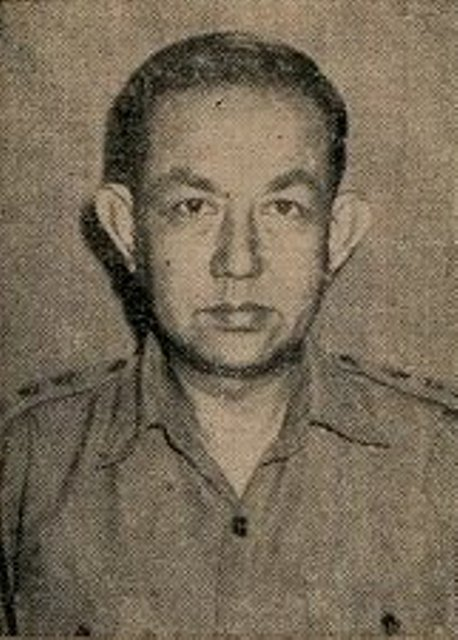
- Commander-in-Chief of the Armed Forces of Myanmar (6 March 1976 – 3 November 1985)
- Native name: ကျော်ထင်
- Born: 26 July 1925; Prome, Myanmar (Burma)
- Died: 26 January 1996 (aged 70) Yangon, Myanmar (Burma)
- Allegiance: Myanmar
- Service years: 1943–1985
- Rank: General
- Service number: BC 5332
- Commands: CO, Reinforce Battalion, Southern Command (1953); CO, 10th Infantry Brigade (1957); CO, 1st Chin Rifle Battalion (1962); CO, 77th Light Infantry Division (1964); CO, 99th Light Infantry Division (1969); Vice Chief of Staff (Army) - (1974); Commander in Chief, (1977)
- Awards: Thura Medal

General Thura Kyaw Htin (Burmese: ကျော်ထင်, pronounced [tɕɔ̀ tʰɪ̀ɰ̃]; 26 July 1925 – 26 January 1996) was the 7th Commander-in-Chief of the Armed Forces of the Union of Burma (now Myanmar), former Deputy Prime Minister of Burma (Myanmar) and Minister of Defence.

== Military career ==
Kyaw Htin enlisted the then Burma Defense Army (BDA) on 8 May 1943 as a private during the Japanese occupation of Burma. The BDA was founded on 26 August 1942 with three thousand Burma Independence Army BIA veterans. He served with the Anti-Aircraft Artillery Battalion based in Ahlone, Rangoon. When Burma achieved nominal independence on 1 August 1943, the BDA was expanded into the Burma National Army (BNA). On 9 September 1944, at the age of 19, Kyaw Htin attended the 4th intake of the Officers Training School in Mingalardon, Rangoon. After the graduation, he was posted as platoon commander of the 4th Burma Rifles battalion. During the fascist revolution against Japan in 1945 the BNA officially joined the Allies as the Patriotic Burma Force (PBF) and Kyaw Htin served as platoon commander for 104th Infantry Battalion. Patriotic Burma Force was reorganized after the war in October, 1945 by the British by incorporating the British Burma Army to form the new post-war Burma Army. Only a small number of PBF troops were selected for the army, with most being sent home with two months pay. Kyaw Htin returned to his native town, Prome.

On 29 January 1946, Kyaw Htin re-enlisted as a private in 4th Burma Rifles. He rose through the ranks to corporal, sergeant and platoon commander. He was promoted to the rank of sergeant major on 15 February 1946. After the independence of Burma from the British on 4 January 1948, he continued his service. He rose to the rank of second lieutenant on 20 September 1948. He was then transferred to 3rd Burma Rifle as platoon commander. Kyaw Htin was promoted to the rank of lieutenant on 20 March 1949 and transferred back to 4th Burma Rifle as platoon commander on 22 March 1949. He was awarded with Thura medal, prestigious award for gallantry and bravery in the face of the enemy that can be awarded to members of Myanmar Armed Forces on 9 June 1950. He was promoted to the rank of captain on 6 December 1950 and served as company commander.

Kyaw Htin was transferred to Reinforce Battalion under Southern Regional Military Command on 23 November 1953 and became acting battalion commander on 26 May 1955. He was then transferred to 10th Infantry Brigade on 9 March 1957. He was promoted to the rank of major on 28 May 1957. Kyaw Htin was then transferred to 1st Chin Rifle Battalion on 31 January 1959 as acting battalion commander.

On 28 May 1962, Kyaw Htin became lieutenant colonel and became official commanding officer of 1st Chin Rifle Battalion. Kyaw Htin was transferred to South Eastern Regional Military Command Headquarters as Colonel General Staff (GSO1) on 7 December 1963. On 19 September 1964, Kyaw Htin was posted to Military Operations Headquarters within the Ministry of Defense as Colonel General Staff (GSO1). He also became deputy director for Directorate of Armor and Artillery at the same time.

On 18 May 1966, he was posted to 77th Light Infantry Division (LID) as deputy commander. While serving with 77th LID, he was promoted to the rank of full colonel. He was the posted to 99th Light Infantry Division as division commander on 12 August 1968, as commander for Yangon Regional Military Command on 3 July 1969.

He was promoted to the rank of brigadier general and became Vice Chief of Staff (Army) on 8 March 1974. Kyaw Htin was promoted to the rank of Lt-General on 6 March 1977 and became Commander in Chief of Tatmadaw. On 6 March 1977, Kyaw Htin was promoted to general and subsequently given the post of Minister for Defence while still serving as Commander in Chief of Tatmadaw.

On 9 November 1982, Kyaw Htin became Deputy Prime Minister of Burma and simultaneously serving as Commander in Chief of Tatmadaw. Kyaw Htin became Minister of Defense on 4 November 1985 and step down as commander in chief. General Saw Maung succeed him as Commander in Chief of Tatmadaw. Kyaw Htin honorably resigned from the army on 30 November 1985.

== Political career ==
Kyaw Htin joined Burma Socialist Programme Party (BSPP) in 1969 as chairman of Yangon Division Management Committee. He then served in various political posts within BSPP.

== Personal life ==
On 13 February 1951, Kyaw Htin, then aged between 25 and 26 years old, married Khin Win Myint in Pyinmana. He died on 26 January 1996, at age 70.

He had 3 daughters and 5 sons. Thant Kyaw, his eldest son, is the former Deputy Minister of Foreign Affairs under Wunna Maung Lwin during Thein Sein's administration and retired in March 2016. Maung Maung Kyaw, his youngest son, is currently serving in the Myanmar Air Force. He was brigadier general and commander of Myeik Airbase (2012–2014) and Meikhtilla Air Base HQ (2014–2016). He was promoted to Air Force Chief-of-Staff in June 2015 to the rank of general in January 2018, and is currently serving as the commander-in-chief of the Myanmar Air Force.

== See also ==
- Military of Myanmar
- Myanmar Army

Military offices
Preceded by Thura Tin Oo	Commander in Chief; 1977–1985	Succeeded by Saw Maung
