= Nyunt Win Swe =

Burmese military officer

- ညွန့်ဝင်းဆွေ

Commander of Bureau of Special Operations 4
- Incumbent
- Assumed office April 2023
- Leader: Min Aung Hlaing
- Preceded by: Khin Hlaing

Commander of the Yangon Command
- In office June 2020 – April 2023
- Leader: Min Aung Hlaing
- Preceded by: Thet Pon
- Succeeded by: Soe Min

Personal details
- Born: Burma (now Myanmar)

Military service
- Allegiance: Myanmar
- Branch/service: Myanmar Army
- Rank: Lieutenant General
- Commands: BSO No. 4

Lieutenant General Nyunt Win Swe (Burmese: ညွန့်ဝင်းဆွေ) (BC - 25982), is a Burmese military officer, the former Union Minister for Home Affairs, and current Commander of Bureau of Special Operation No. 4.

== Military career ==
He was appointed to the post in June 2020, and previously served as the commandant of the Defence Services Medical Academy and commander of the Southwestern Command.

In the aftermath of the 2021 Myanmar coup d'état, the military junta declared martial law in Yangon, the country's largest city, an act that effectively granted Nyunt Win Swe with administrative and judicial powers in Yangon's townships. Nyunt Win Swe led military and police forces who committed the Hlaingthaya massacre on 14 March 2021. He has been sanctioned by the European Union, Switzerland, and Canada for violating human rights and committing crimes against civilians in the Yangon Command.

In April 2023, he was promoted to the rank of lieutenant general, succeeding Khin Hlaing as the head of Bureau of Special Operations (BSO) No. 4.

== See also ==
- 2021–2023 Myanmar civil war
- State Administration Council
- Tatmadaw
