= Maung Aye =

Burmese army general (born 1937)

His Excellency Vice-Senior General Maung Aye
- မောင်အေး
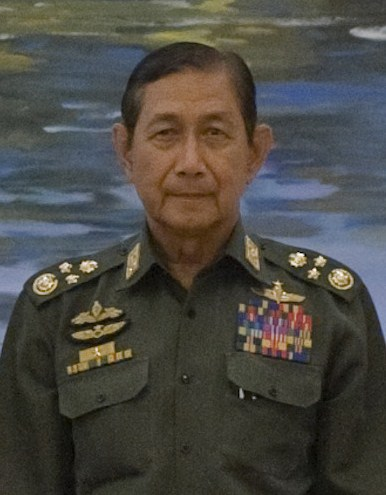
- Maung Aye in 2011

Vice Chairman of the State Peace and Development Council
- In office July 1993 – 30 March 2011
- Chairman: Than Shwe
- Preceded by: Than Shwe
- Succeeded by: Tin Aung Myint Oo and Sai Mauk Kham (Vice Presidents)

Deputy Commander-in-Chief of Defence Services
- In office July 1993 – 30 March 2011
- Preceded by: Than Shwe
- Succeeded by: Soe Win

Personal details
- Born: 25 December 1937 (age 88) Syriam, British Burma (now Myanmar)
- Party: State Peace and Development Council (military dictatorship)
- Spouse: Mya Mya San
- Children: 1
- Education: Defence Services Academy

Military service
- Allegiance: Myanmar
- Branch/service: Myanmar Army
- Years of service: 1959–2011
- Rank: Vice Senior General

Maung Aye (Burmese: မောင်အေး; pronounced [maʊɴ ʔé]; born 25 December 1937) is a retired Burmese army general who played a significant role in Myanmar's military government. He served as Vice Chairman of the State Peace and Development Council (SPDC), the ruling military junta of Myanmar, from July 1993 to March 2011, holding the second highest-ranking position in the regime. He graduated from the Defence Services Academy in Pyin Oo Lwin and began his military career by commanding the Northeast Region in 1968, followed by the Eastern Region in 1988. His career progression included promotions to major-general in 1990 and Army Chief in 1992. In 1993, he was appointed as Deputy Commander-in-Chief of Defence Services, and the following year, he assumed the role of Deputy Chairman of the State Law and Order Restoration Council (SLORC), which later evolved into the SPDC. Despite rumours of resignation in August 2010, Maung Aye remained deputy head of state until the SPDC was dissolved on 30 March 2011 by Senior General Than Shwe, marking a significant transition in Myanmar's governance.

Maung Aye served as vice-chairman of Myanmar's State Peace and Development Council (SPDC) from July 1993 to March 2011, playing a significant role in the country's military administration. Known for his strategic foresight and leadership, Maung Aye oversaw key military operations and held influential positions within the SPDC hierarchy. His tenure coincided with crucial moments in Myanmar's political landscape, navigating through reforms and challenges within the Tatmadaw regime. Despite speculations and adversities, Maung Aye's steadfast tenure as deputy head of state until the SPDC's dissolution in March 2011 underscored his enduring influence on Myanmar's governance.

== Early life and education ==
Maung Aye was born on 25 December 1937 in Syriam, British Burma (now Myanmar). He attended the Defence Services Academy in Pyin Oo Lwin, where he graduated with a Bachelor of Science degree. The academy provided him with a solid education in military strategy and leadership, laying the groundwork for his future military career.

== Military career ==
Maung Aye graduated from the Defence Services Academy in Pyin Oo Lwin with a Bachelor of Science degree in 1960. In 1966, he became commander of the Northeast Region. In 1988, he became commander of the Eastern Region. Two years later in 1990, he was promoted to major-general. In 1992, he was made Army Chief and was promoted as a Lieutenant General and simultaneously made Deputy Commander in Chief of Defense Services. In 1994, he was appointed Deputy Chairman of the State Law and Order Restoration Council (SLORC), and subsequently held the same position in the SPDC.

Vice-Senior General Maung Aye and Senior General Than Shwe, along with six other top military officers, were reported to have resigned their military posts on 27 August 2010. He reportedly transferred the deputy commander-in-chief post to Lt-Gen Ko Ko, head of Chief of Bureau of Special Operation-3, but remains the country's deputy head of state. The rumours were later proven false. However, on 30 March 2011, the SPDC was dissolved by Than Shwe in favour of the elected President Thein Sein, which meant that Maung Aye's post also ceased to exist.

== Personal life ==
Maung Aye is married to Mya Mya San and has one daughter, Nandar Aye. Nandar Aye is married to Pyi Aung (also spelt Pye Aung), the son of Aung Thaung, a former government minister and Pyithu Hluttaw representative.
