= Smith Dun =

Burmese general

Lieutenant General Smith Dun MC
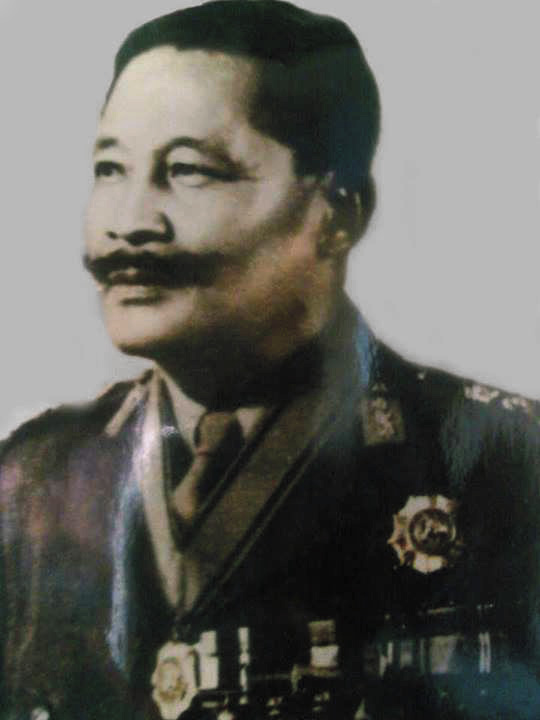
- Smith Dun c. 1948
- Born: 11 November 1906; Irrawaddy delta, Burma Province, British India
- Died: 30 January 1979 (aged 72); Kalaw, Shan State, Burma
- Military career
- Allegiance: British India; British Burma; Burma
- Branch: British Indian Army; British Burma Army; Burmese Army
- Service years: 1924–1949
- Rank: Lieutenant-General (Burmese Army); Brigadier (Indian Army)
- Nickname: The Four-Foot Colonel
- Service number: IC-3 (India); BC 5106 (Burma)
- Units: Karen Rifles; Burma Rifles
- Commands: Burmese Army
- Conflicts: Mohmand campaign of 1935; World War II
- Awards: Sword of Honour; Military Cross

Lieutenant General Smith Dun MC (11 November 1906 – 1979) was the commander-in-chief of the Burmese Army from 4 January 1948 to 1 February 1949.

== Personal life ==
He was an ethnic Karen and the first person belonging to the ethnic group to hold the office.

Dun retired to Kalaw where he died in 1979. he is buried in Kalaw Christian Cemetery.

== British Indian Army ==
Dun enlisted in the Indian Army on 8 November 1924, initially with the 10th battalion 20th Burma Rifles and after training served with the 2nd battalion 20th Burma Rifles, seeing service in Burma during the rebellion of 1930-32.

He was commissioned a Viceroy's Commissioned Officer on 10 January 1931. He attended the Kitchener College, Nowgong and from there was later selected to attend the Indian Military Academy as part of the first batch of cadets. Called "The Pioneers", his class also produced Sam Maneckshaw and Muhammad Musa Khan, future commanders-in-chief of India and Pakistan, respectively and earned the first Sword of Honour which is given to the best cadet of each year’s class. He was commissioned on 1 February 1935, his seniority later being antedated to 4 February 1934. For a year after commissioning he was attached to the 2nd battalion the Kings Own Yorkshire Light Infantry at Agra. On 24 February 1936 he was admitted to the Indian Army and appointed to the 2nd battalion the 1st Punjab Regiment on 9 March 1936. He was promoted Lieutenant on 4 May 1936. His battalion was involved in fighting on the North West Frontier during 1936-37. Dunn served under D T Cowan in 17th Indian Division. During his tenure under Burma Corps, he was nicknamed four-foot colonel by William Slim.

He was serving attached to the Burma Military Police when the Japanese invaded in 1941. For his services on the retreat from Burma he was Mentioned in Despatches (London Gazette 28 October 1942). He attended the Staff College at Quetta and then saw further service in Burma, receiving another Mention in Despatches (London Gazette 5 April 1945) and later was awarded the Military Cross (London Gazette 17 January 1946) as a temporary Major attached the Burma Intelligence Corps. He was promoted to war-substantive lieutenant-colonel in the Indian Army, to acting colonel on 15 November 1945 and to temporary colonel on 5 May 1946. He retired from the Indian Army on 3 January 1949 as an honorary brigadier.

== Burmese Army ==
In a move to build confidence in the Burmese Union that would include all ethnic groups, Dun, a Karen, was appointed commander-in-chief of the Burmese army and of the police forces when Burma gained its independence from Britain following World War II. However, in 1949 when the Karen began their war for independence from Burma, Dun was removed from his position. Dun was a loyal leader of the Burmese Army while maintaining a strong sense of his Karen ethnicity. Known as the "four-foot colonel" for his small stature, he kept his Karen soldiers disciplined although suspicion of his ethnic roots lingered even after his dismissal.

== See also ==
- Indian Army
- Military of Myanmar
