= Defence Services Academy =

Military academy in Myanmar

Coordinates: 22°01′26.68″N 96°26′55.27″E

Defence Services Academy (DSA)
- စစ်‌တက္ကသိုလ်
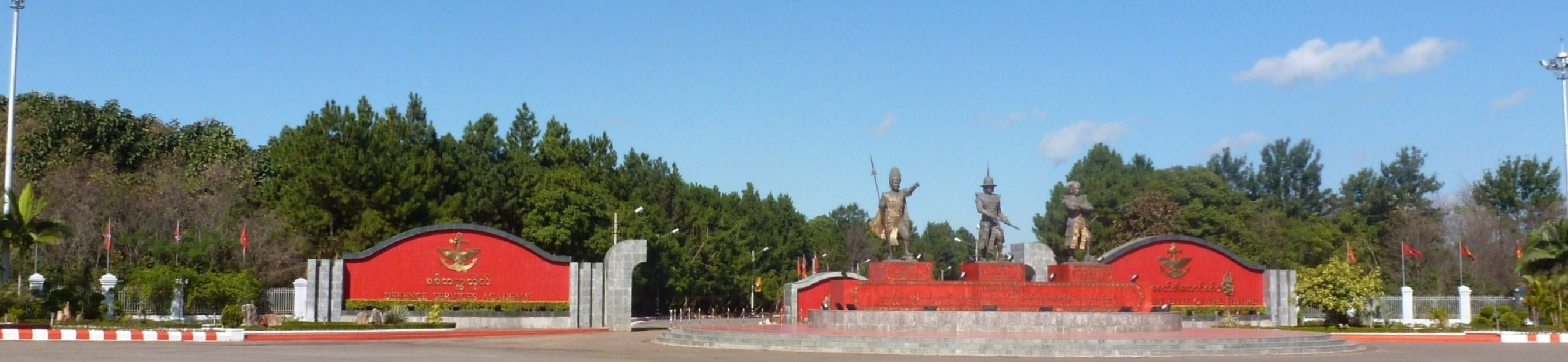
- The DSA, Pyinoolwin
- Motto: နောင်တစ်ခေတ်၏ အောင်စစ်သည်
- Motto in English: The Triumphant Elites of the Future
- Type: Public
- Established: 1954; 72 years ago
- Rector: Brigadier General Thein Lwin
- Commandant: Brigadier General Zaw Min Latt
- Faculty: 300
- Students: 7500
- Undergraduates: 5000
- Postgraduates: 1500
- Doctoral students: 50
- Location: Pyin Oo Lwin, Mandalay Region, Myanmar
- Nickname: Daw Sein Aye

The Defence Services Academy (Burmese: စစ်‌တက္ကသိုလ်, lit. 'Military University', pronounced [sɪʔ tɛʔkəθò]) located in Pyin Oo Lwin, is the premier military service academy of Myanmar, training future officers for all three branches of Myanmar military. The Ministry of Defence-administered academy offers bachelor's degree programs in liberal arts, combined physical sciences, and computer science. DSA had conferred basic degrees on 33,065 graduates from the first graduation ceremony up to the 62nd graduation in December 2021.

The DSA graduates are commissioned in one of the three branches of Myanmar military.

== History ==
The DSA was established in Ba Htoo Station in southern Shan State on 1 August 1954, and was moved to its current home, a former British hill station of Pyin Oo Lwin (formerly, Maymyo) between 20 and 26 June 1957. The first commandant of DSA was Col. Thiri Pyanchi Kyaw Soe.

On 28 January 2025, the State Administration Council military regime announced plans to temporarily move the DSA to the Yezin Agricultural University in Zeyathiri Township, Naypyidaw due to anti-junta gains in Mandalay Region and Shan State.

== Mission ==
The purpose of the academy is to "train a new generation of highly educated and well-rounded officers for Myanmar's armed forces who are capable of leading the nation". The DSA emphasizes on the academic curriculum alongside the military training with the intention of developing individuals who are capable of running the entire nation. This might sound ironically appropriate given Myanmar Army's frequent aspirations to rule the country rather than serve its people. In contrast, the mission of Officers Training School, Bahtoo (OTS) is to train the future commanders who can lead the Armed Forces in times of war. Furthermore, the OTS does not offer any additional academic qualifications, and the admission is usually open only to degree-holders. From 1999 onwards, it is open only to non-commissioned officers and servicemen holding degrees who demonstrate extraordinary qualities to become officers. Training duration is nine months.

== Admissions ==
As the country's most prestigious military academy, the DSA receives many applications from high school graduates each year. Unlike at most other Myanmar universities, the selection process goes beyond the University Entrance Examination matriculation marks, including physical fitness tests, teamwork and comradeship screening, psychometric assessments and general interviews. The academy is open only to male applicants.

== Programs ==
The DSA offers four-year bachelor's degree programs in liberal arts, combined physical sciences (with specializations in areas such as chemistry, physics, mathematics, geology) and computer science. The undergraduate degree programs used to take four years but from the 42nd intake onwards, the duration has been reduced to three years. The DSA comprises two main branches: the academic wing and the training wing.

=== Departments ===
1. Department of Myanmar
2. Department of International Relations
3. Department of English
4. Department of Mathematics
5. Department of Chemistry
6. Department of Physics
7. Department of Electronics
8. Department of Computer Science
9. Department of Computer Technology
10. Department of Geology
11. Department of Psychology

=== Military education ===
All cadets receive mandatory military training. The structure of the DSA is based on British and American (i.e. Sandhurst and West Point respectively) military training traditions as well as home-grown practices.

In the tradition of American system, the senior cadet officers are assigned to mentor junior cadet officers, overseeing day-to-day training, discipline and welfare of the juniors in general, with the aim of developing the so-called "guardian brotherhood" so as to develop a sense of community, comradeship, faith and trust, chain of command and looking after one another. This function is supervised by an officer (known as company officer), usually at the rank of captain, who is then supported by a senior non-commissioned officer, usually at the rank of master sergeant. The sergeant more closely interacts with the cadet officers and is directly in the chain-of-command, and is similar to the British system.

Unlike in American and British systems, which maintain separate military academies for different branches of armed forces, the DSA trains for all three branches of Myanmar military (army, navy and air force). Its cadets select the branch to enter upon their graduation, subject to fulfilling further health and training requirements.

In general, cadets at the DSA starts their day in the early mornings with rigorous physical training, followed by academic lectures, then by military training. After the exams, they also spend a period devoted solely for military training which take place at various locations across the country. As part of their study requirements, they are taught political science, general law, international relations and other related subjects alongside their main studies regardless of specialism. In common with other universities in the country, the cadets are required to study Myanmar, English and mathematics regardless of the subject they major in.

The first few weeks of the 1st year is known as "soldier indoctrination week" when newly recruited cadet officers are trained to have military mentality. Further more, cadet officers are not allowed to keep in touch with the outside world, not even with family (unless under exceptional circumstances such as death of a family member), for the first six months of the first year which is a period meant to transform these young high school graduates from civilians into potential military officers. Cadets are subject to further disciplinary requirements such as having to refrain from visiting the restricted areas of the city and the dress-code both while on DSA grounds and while in the city, even during their private time.

The board and room, uniform and food, as well as other essential supplies, for the cadet officers and their tuition costs are borne by the academy. In addition, they also receive a small amount of monthly allowance. In the past, up to 18th Intake, the academy allowed so-called private cadets who are well-qualified, and satisfied by admission board, but do not want military service obligation upon graduation. Such applicants pay tuition fees to the academy and fund their own cost of living while receiving education and training at the academy in exactly as the same way as the other regular cadet officers. Such private cadets are not obliged to serve in the Armed Forces upon graduation. However, they may choose to serve, at their own discretion, in the Armed Forces. Private cadets made up about 5~10% of each intakes. Private cadets are, however, no longer admitted after 18th Intake. The minimum contract of the military service for the regular cadet officers upon graduation is 10 years.

== Facilities ==
- Planetarium (one of two planetariums in Myanmar)
- Library
- Computer laboratory for parallel and distributed computing
- Computer clusters
- Computer-assisted foreign language facilities
- Telescope facilities
- Chemistry and geology teaching laboratory
- Radiation physics research laboratory
- Electronics laboratory with clean room facilities
- Olympic-size swimming pool
- Several large sports fields with football grounds and tennis courts
- Gymnasiums

== Commandants ==
- Colonel Thiri Pyanchi Kyaw Soe (August 1, 1954 – March 7, 1957)
- Colonel Thiri Pyanchi Than Sein (March 8, 1957 – May 26, 1957)
- Colonel Thiri Pyanchi L Khun Naung (October 9, 1957 – October 31, 1968)
- Colonel Zaya Kyawhtin Htun Aung Kyaw (November 1, 1968 – May 28, 1972)
- Colonel Kyaw Nyein (May 29, 1972 – July 31, 1975)
- Colonel Khin Maung Tint (August 1, 1975 – June 30, 1977)
- Colonel Aye Ko (July 1, 1977 – October 3, 1979)
- Colonel Aung Win (October 4, 1979 – August 19, 1981)
- Colonel Sein Ya (August 20, 1981 – May 22, 1982)
- Colonel Thein Saing (May 23, 1982 – October 10, 1986)
- Colonel Aung Naing (October 18, 1986 – August 5, 1992)
- Brigadier General Soe Win Maung (August 6, 1992 – December 10, 1997)
- Colonel Tin Win (December 11, 1997 – January 4, 1999)
- Brigadier General Moe Hein (January 5, 1999 – August 27, 1999)
- Brigadier General Tin Oo (August 28, 1999 – May 14, 2001)
- Brigadier General Ye Myint (July 20, 2001 – December 22, 2001)
- Brigadier General Khin Zaw (December 23, 2001 – May 19, 2002)
- Brigadier General Ohn Myint (July 27, 2002 – August 30, 2003)
- Brigadier General Tharaysithu Min Aung Hlaing (August 31, 2003 – November 6, 2004)
- Brigadier General Nyi Tun (April 5, 2005 – May 27, 2006)
- Brigadier General Kyaw Swe (August 11, 2006 – November 6, 2007)
- Brigadier General Thiri Pyanchi Zeyar Aung (November 7, 2007 – August 30, 2010)
- Brigadier General Mya Htun Oo (August 31, 2010 – December 26, 2010)
- Brigadier General Nyo Saw (May 7, 2011 – October 1, 2011)
- Major General Aung Lin Dwe (October 2, 2011 – January 18, 2014)
- Major General Myint Maw (January 19, 2014 – January 6, 2017)
- Major General Thaung Htike Shwe (January 7, 2017 – June 17, 2018)
- Major General Htin Latt Oo (June 18, 2018 – July 24, 2020)
- Major General Zaw Hein (July 25, 2020 – August 28, 2021)
- Brigadier/Major General Zaw Min Latt (August 29, 2021 – 2023)
- Brigadier/Major General Soe Myat Htut (2023 – present)

== Notable alumni ==
- Former Captain Htet Myat - DSA 52nd intake
- Former Major Tin Lin Aung - DSA 47th intake
- Former Captain Nay Myo Zin - DSA 39th intake
- Former Captain Ye Min Aung - DSA 51st intake
- Vice-Senior General Maung Aye, army chief and Vice Chairman of the SPDC - DSA 1st intake
- Colonel U Thaung, Minister of Science and Technology - Awarded Best Cadet in DSA 1st intake.
- Colonel Bo Shane, Captain Naval Staff - Awarded Best Trainee in DSA 1st intake
- Lieutenant General Tin Hla, Deputy Prime Minister, Minister of Military Affairs and Founder of MEC -DSA 3rd Intake
- Captain Win Htein, graduated at the top of his class-made history as the first graduate ever to receive two awards at the same time: the Best Cadet (for martial excellence) and the Best Scholar (for academic excellence); elected to the Pyithu Hluttaw seat of Meiktila Township, his hometown, to represent the National League for Democracy after the Myanmar by-elections in April 2012; a patron and member of the Central Executive Committee of National League for Democracy (NLD) party - DSA 5th intake
- General Thein Sein, President - DSA 9th intake
- Lieutenant-General Tin Aye, Chairman, Union Electoral Commission - DSA 9th intake
- General Thura Shwe Mann, Speaker of the Pyithu Hluttaw - DSA 11th intake
- General Thiha Thura Tin Aung Myint Oo, Vice President of Myanmar - DSA 12th intake
- Brigadier-General Hla Myint, 13th intake
- Lieutenant General Myint Swe, Chief of Bureau of Special Operation-5 - DSA 15th intake
- Lieutenant-General Ye' Myint, Directorate of Military Affairs Security - DSA 15th intake
- Lieutenant-General Tha Aye, Chief of Bureau of Special Operation - 4 - DSA 16th intake
- Col. Wunna Maung Lwin, Minister of Foreign Affairs of Myanmar - 16th intake
- Lieutenant-General Ohn Myint, Minister of Co-operative - DSA 17th intake
- Senior General Min Aung Hlaing, Commander in Chief - DSA 19th intake
- Lieutenant-General Ko Ko, Minister for Home Affairs - DSA 19th intake
- General Hla Htay Win, Joint Chief - Ministry of Defence - DSA 20th intake

== See also ==
- Defence Services Technological Academy
- Defence Services Medical Academy
- Defence Services Institute of Nursing and Paramedical Science
