= Northwestern Regional Military Command (Myanmar) =

Northwestern Regional Military Command of Myanmar

- အနောက်မြောက်တိုင်းစစ်ဌာနချုပ်
- Emblem of Northwestern Regional Military Command
- Country: Myanmar
- Branch: Myanmar Army
- Type: Regional Military Command
- Role: Territorial defense, security, military operations, administration, and supervision of all military units within the region
- Garrison Commander: Brigadier General Hein Yan Lin
- Nicknames: Bow and Arrow
- Colors

Commanders
- Commander: Major General Soe Win Tun
- Deputy Commander: Major General Moe Hein
- Chief of Staff: Major General Kyaw Swar Win

Insignia
- Flag

The Northwestern Regional Military Command (Burmese: အနောက်မြောက်ပိုင်းတိုင်းစစ်ဌာနချုပ်); short form: Na Ma Kha (Burmese: နမခ) is a regional military command of the Myanmar Army, headquartered in Monywa near the Monywa-Ye U Highway. It is primarily responsible for the defense, security, and military operations in Sagaing Region, northern Magway Region, and Chin State, as well as adjacent areas. In addition to its defense responsibilities, the command oversees military administration, operations, and logistics for subordinate units and supporting battalions within its jurisdiction. It also executes orders and directives from higher military authorities and ensures supervision and coordination within its operational area. The current commander of the Northwestern Command is Major General Soe Win Tun.

== History ==
The command was established in October 1961, with its headquarters initially based in Mandalay. At the time of its formation, the first commander was Colonel San Yu. After 1988, the Northwestern Command was separated, with the Central Command (Myanmar) relocating from Taungoo to Mandalay. The Northwestern Command was then relocated to Monywa. Meanwhile, a new Southern Command (Myanmar) was established in Taungoo.

== Organizational Structure ==
1. Regional Military Command Headquarters
  1. Commander’s Office
  2. Deputy Commander’s Office
  3. Chief of Staff (Colonel) Office
    1. Military Chief of Staff (Lieutenant Colonel) Office
      1. First-Class Military Chief of Staff
        1. Operations Department
        2. Duties and Training Department
      2. First-Class Military Chief of Staff (Military Security Affairs)
      3. First-Class Military Chief of Staff (People’s Army Affairs)
    2. Senior Officer (Lieutenant Colonel, Military Department) Office
      1. First-Class Senior Officer (Finance Department) Office
      2. First-Class Senior Officer (Records Department) Office
    3. Senior Officer (Lieutenant Colonel, Intelligence Department) Office
      1. First-Class Senior Officer (Replenishment and Maintenance Department) Office
      2. First-Class Senior Officer (Logistics and Transportation Department) Office
  4. Garrison Office
2. Regional Operations Command
  1. Regional Operations Command Office
  2. Infantry and Light Infantry Battalions under its command
3. Permanent Military Strategic Units
  1. Permanent Military Strategic Unit Office
  2. Infantry and Light Infantry Battalions under its command
4. Strategic Units (or) Mobile Strategic Units
  - Infantry and Light Infantry Battalions under its command

Northwestern regional military command area includes the following military headquarters and their subordinate strategic units and battalions.

== Strategic Units ==
1. Strategic Unit Base (Hakha)
2. Strategic Unit Base (Kantbalu)
3. Strategic Unit Base (Matupi)

== Light Infantry Divisions and Operational Command Headquarters within the Northwestern Command area ==
1. 33rd Light Infantry Division Headquarters
2. 101st Light Infantry Division Headquarters
3. 10th Operational Command Headquarters
4. 72nd Armored Operational Command Headquarters

== List of Northwestern Command Commanders ==
- Lieutenant Colonel Maung Shwe (Army Serial No. 3575) (16-10-1961 to 29-11-1961)
- Colonel San Yu (Army Serial No. 3569) (29-11-1961 to 15-02-1963)
- Lieutenant Colonel Lunn Tin (Army Serial No. 3610) (15-02-1963 to 21-05-1965)
- Lieutenant Colonel Sein Mya (Army Serial No. 3576) (21-05-1965 to 02-07-1969)
- Lieutenant Colonel Sein Lwin (Army Serial No. 5444) (03-07-1969 to 08-03-1974)
- Lieutenant Colonel Aye Ko (Army Serial No. 6133) (08-03-1974 to 18-03-1975)
- Colonel Hla Htun (Army Serial No. 5497) (Officer Training School Batch 1) (18-03-1975 to 21-07-1977)
- Colonel Aung Khin (Army Serial No. 5934) (21-07-1977 to 04-05-1979)
- Colonel Than Nyunt (Army Serial No. 6356) (04-05-1979 to 04-11-1985)
- Brigadier General Tun Kyi (Army Serial No. 7864) (Defense Services Academy Batch 1) (04-11-1985 to ...)
- Brigadier General Kyaw Min (Army Serial No. 7126)
- Brigadier General Hla Myint Swe (Officer Training School Batch 30)
- Brigadier General Soe Win (Army Serial No. 11715) (Defense Services Academy Batch 12)
- Brigadier General Soe Naing (Army Serial No. ...) (Defense Services Academy Batch 17)
- Brigadier General Myint Soe (Army Serial No. 16391) (Officer Training School Batch 61)
- Brigadier General Soe Lwin (Army Serial No. 18189)
- Brigadier General Aung Lin Dwe (Army Serial No. 18263) (Defense Services Academy Batch 25)
- Brigadier General Thet Pon (Army Serial No. 20735) (Defense Services Academy Batch 29) (Currently Deputy Commander-in-Chief, No. 5 Military Operations Command)
- Brigadier General Phone Myat (Army Serial No. 20324) (Officer Training School Batch 73) (Currently Deputy Commander-in-Chief, No. 3 Military Operations Command)
- Brigadier General Soe Tint Naing (Later Deputy Minister of Home Affairs)
- Brigadier General Myo Moe Aung (Army Serial No. 22572) (Defense Services Academy Batch 32) (Currently Deputy Commander-in-Chief, Chief of Air Defense)

== See also ==
- Northeastern Regional Military Command (Myanmar)
- Western Regional Military Command (Myanmar)
- Myanmar Army
- Tatmadaw
