= Myint Kyaw Tun =

Myanmar military officer

His Excellency Major General Myint Kyaw Tun
- မြင့်ကျော်ထွန်း

Commander of the Yangon Regional Command
- In office 2022–2023

Commander of the Central Command
- In office 2023–2024

Personal details
- Education: Defence Services Academy

Military service
- Allegiance: Myanmar
- Branch/service: Myanmar Army
- Rank: Major General

Myint Kyaw Tun (Burmese: မြင့်ကျော်ထွန်း; pronounced [mjɪ̀ɴ tɕjáʊ tʰwɪ̀ɴ]) is a Burmese military officer who held senior positions in the Myanmar Armed Forces. He served as commander of the Yangon Regional Command from 2022 to 2023 and Central Command from 2023 to 2024. In February 2025, he was arrested amid allegations of involvement in online scam operations.

== Military career ==
As a general, he held the position of deputy Chief of Armed Forces Training.

In October 2024, after the Battle of Lashio, he was reportedly reassigned as commander of the Northeastern Command, despite the command being largely captured by anti-junta forces at that point. He became the commander based out of the temporary headquarters in Tangyan.

== Arrest ==
On 21 February 2025, Myint Kyaw Tun was arrested during a graduation ceremony at Ba Htoo Military Academy in southern Shan State. His arrest, along with that of three other officers, followed reports linking them to online scam activities operating in the region.

Burmese news sources cited Chinese intelligence tipping off Myanmar authorities. The military council subsequently detained Myint Kyaw Tun, Colonel Tun Naing Soe, Colonel Tun Tin, and Lieutenant Colonel Myat Maw Aung. He was replaced by Brigadier General Aye Min Oo as the new commander of the Northeastern Command.

== See also ==
- Tatmadaw
