= Aung Kyaw Zaw =

Burmese lieutenant general (born 1961)

- အောင်ကျော်ဇော်

Commander of Bureau of Special Operations No. 3
- In office 2015 – January 2018

Personal details
- Born: 20 August 1961 (age 64) Myanmar (Burma)
- Profession: Army general

Military service
- Allegiance: Myanmar
- Branch/service: Myanmar Army
- Years of service: c. 1980s–2018
- Rank: Lieutenant General
- Unit: Bureau of Special Operations No. 3; Bureau of Special Operations No. 6
- Battles/wars: Internal conflicts, including Rakhine operations

Aung Kyaw Zaw (Burmese: အောင်ကျော်ဇော်; pronounced [ʔàʊɰ̃ t͡ɕɔ̀ zɔ̀]; born 20 August 1961) is a Burmese army general who held multiple senior posts, including command of the Bureau of Special Operations No. 3 (BSO‑3), which oversaw operations in Rakhine State during the 2017 Rohingya crisis. He was sanctioned by the European Union in 2018 for his alleged role in human rights violations.

== Early life and education ==
Aung Kyaw Zaw was born on 20 August 1961 in Myanmar. He graduated from the Defence Services Academy, Myanmar’s principal institution for training military officers, and began his service in the Tatmadaw in the 1980s.

== Military career ==
He served as commander of the Northeastern Regional Command from 2010 to 2012 and later the Southern Regional Command until 2015. In August 2015, he was appointed to lead BSO‑3, one of the highest operational units in the Myanmar Army. During his tenure, BSO‑3 coordinated military activities in Rakhine State.

His command coincided with the 2017 crackdown on the Rohingya population, during which the United Nations and rights groups accused Myanmar’s military of mass atrocities. In early 2018, he was transferred to lead BSO‑6 and retired from active service later that year.

== Sanctions ==
In June 2018, following documented atrocities in Rakhine State, the European Union imposed sanctions on Aung Kyaw Zaw. The restrictions included travel bans and asset freezes for his role overseeing unlawful killings, sexual violence, and the destruction of Rohingya homes.

== Public record and criticism ==
Despite internal Tatmadaw justifications, independent reports—such as those from Amnesty International—highlight his presence in Rakhine during key operations and assert he made no efforts to prevent subordinates from committing documented abuses.
