= Phyo Thant =

Burmese military officer

- ဖြိုးသန့်

Deputy Minister for Border Affairs
- Incumbent
- Assumed office 6 January 2022
- Preceded by: Khun Thant Zaw Htoo

Commander of Northwestern Regional Command
- In office February 2021 – 6 January 2022
- Leader: Min Aung Hlaing
- Succeeded by: Than Htike

Personal details
- Education: Officers Training School

Military service
- Allegiance: Myanmar
- Branch/service: Myanmar Army
- Rank: Brigadier General

Brigadier General Phyo Thant (Burmese: ဖြိုးသန့်) is a Burmese military officer and incumbent deputy minister for border affairs of Myanmar. He previously served as the commander of the Northwestern Regional Command.

== Career ==
Phyo Thant graduated from the 23rd intake of the Officers Training School. He served as the division commander of Military Operation Command No. 4 under Yangon Regional Command until he was promoted to Northwestern Regional Command after the 2021 Myanmar coup d'état. It is rumored that soon after his appointment, the military regime detained and interrogated him for his plan to defect and take refuge in an ethnically controlled area. He is said to be the highest-ranking regime official so far to switch allegiance to the Civil Disobedience Movement (CDM) against the junta and the highest-ranking officer to be arrested. The local media reported that he died during the interrogation. According to a recent source, he vehemently denied the rumors and asserted that they were baseless. His arrest was reportedly attributed to his alleged poor performance in the wake of substantial losses against resistance fighters in the Chin State and Sagaing Region.

In January 2022, he was removed from his position as commander following the loss of hundreds of soldiers under his command to opposition fighters. Subsequently, Lieutenant General Than Htike assumed the interim command. He was subsequently appointed as the deputy minister for border affairs.

== See also ==
- 2021 Myanmar coup d'état
- State Administration Council
- Tatmadaw
