= Laukkai Regional Military Operations Command (Myanmar) =

Laukkai Regional Military Operations Command of Myanmar

- လောက်ကိုင်ဒေသ စစ်ရေး စစ်ဆင်ရေးကွပ်ကဲမှု
- Emblem of the Laukkai Regional Military Operations Command
- Country: Myanmar
- Branch: Myanmar Army
- Type: Regional Military Operations Command
- Part of: Northeastern Regional Military Command (Myanmar)
- Headquarters: Laukkai Town, Kokang Self-Administered Zone

Commanders
- Regional Operations Commander: Brigadier General Moe Kyaw Thu
- Deputy Regional Operations Commander: Brigadier General

Insignia
- Flag

The Laukkai Regional Military Operations Command (Burmese: လောက်ကိုင်ဒေသကွပ်ကဲမှုစစ်ဌာနချုပ်); short form: Da Ka Sa (Burmese: ဒကစ) is a subordinate unit under the Northeastern Regional Military Command, headquartered in Laukkai, the capital of the Kokang Self-Administered Zone. Its primary responsibilities include representing the regional military command in defense, security, and operational matters in remote areas under its jurisdiction. Given its strategic location along the border with the People's Republic of China, it plays a crucial role in maintaining control over this significant area. Additionally, it manages military affairs (operations, administration, and logistics) of subordinate units and other supporting troops within its territory and conveys orders and directives from higher military authorities on behalf of the regional command. Currently, the command is also assisting in civil administration, as the Kokang Self-Administered Zone remains under military governance. The present commander of the Laukkai Regional Military Operations Command is Brigadier General Moe Kyaw Thu. On 4 January 2024, following the first phase of Operation 1027, the Myanmar National Democratic Alliance Army gained full control over Laukkai Township and the Laukkai Regional Military Operations Command.

== History ==
Following the Kokang Incident, Brigadier General Win Maung was removed from his position, and Brigadier General Hla Myint was appointed in his place.

== Structure ==
The structure of the Laukkai Regional Military Operations Command is as follows:

=== Regional Military Operations Command Office ===
1. Regional Military Operations Command Office
2. Deputy Regional Military Operations Command Office
3. Headquarters (First Level) Office
  1. Headquarters (Second Level) Office
  2. Officer-in-charge (Second Level) (Military Department) Office
  3. Officer-in-charge (Second Level) (Logistics Department) Office
4. Administrative Troop Office

=== Subordinate Infantry Units under Direct Command ===
The infantry units directly controlled by the Laukkai Regional Military Operations Command are as follows:

1. 125th Infantry Unit (Kone Kyan)
2. 127th Infantry Unit (Kaukaw-Kwamlone)
3. 128th Infantry Unit (Pasin Kyaw)
4. 129th Infantry Unit (Yan Kwan-Chin Shwe Haw)
5. 239th Infantry Unit (Nali-Laukkai)
6. 312th Infantry Unit (Kwamlone)
7. 322nd Infantry Unit (Laukkai)

== Commanders of the Regional Military Operations Command ==
1. Brigadier General Moe Kyaw Thu

== Disarmament ==
On 27 October 2023, during the Northern United Alliance (NUA) Operation 1027, the Laukkai Regional Military Operations Command underwent a disarmament process, which was completed on 4 January 2024.
