= Sein Win (general, born 1956) =

Burmese politician

His Excellency Lieutenant General Sein Win
- စိန်ဝင်း
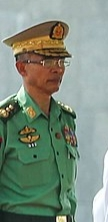

Minister of Defence of Myanmar
- In office 24 August 2015 – 1 February 2021
- President: Thein Sein; Htin Kyaw; Myint Swe (acting); Win Myint
- Preceded by: Wai Lwin
- Succeeded by: Mya Tun Oo

Personal details
- Born: 24 July 1956 (age 69) Taze Township, Burma

Military service
- Allegiance: Myanmar
- Branch/service: Myanmar Army
- Rank: Lieutenant general

Lt. Gen. Sein Win (Burmese: စိန်ဝင်း, pronounced [sèiɴ wɪ́ɴ]) is a Burmese politician and lieutenant general in the Myanmar Armed Forces who served as the Minister of Defence of Myanmar from 24 August 2015 to 1 February 2021.

== Early life and education ==
Sein Win was born on 24 July 1956 to Chit Maung and Daw Kyi in the village of Khabaungkyaing in Taze Township, Sagaing Division, Burma (now Sagaing Region, Myanmar). Sein Win graduated from the 54th intake of the Officers Training School, Bahtoo.

== Career ==
He headed the newly created Air Defense Office under the Ministry of Defense in 2002, long before becoming a defense minister.

From 2010, he served as Chief of Staff of the Bureau of Air Defence of the Myanmar Army. He was appointed Minister of Defence by military officials on 24 August 2015, along with the Minister of Border Affairs.

In his capacity as Defense Minister, Sein Win also attended occasional regional meetings and might therefore be able to potentially relate to other Southeast Asian governments on relevant issues.

== Personal life ==
Sein Win is married to Myint Myint Aye, and has 3 daughters, Shwe Sin, Ngwe Sin, and Kyi Sin.
