= 1976 Burmese coup attempt =

- Part of History of Burma (1962–1988)
Date	July 1976
Location	Burma (now Myanmar)
Status	Plot exposed before execution

Belligerents
Government of Burma	Dissident Burmese Army officers

Commanders and leaders
Ne Win; San Yu; Tin Oo	Ohn Kyaw Myint

Units involved
Tatmadaw	Junior army officers

The 1976 Burmese coup attempt was a failed plot in Burma to assassinate long-time dictator General Ne Win and two of his top officials, namely defense minister General San Yu and intelligence chief Colonel Tin Oo. The conspiracy was organized by a group of junior army officers led by Captain Ohn Kyaw Myint.

The conspirators planned to strike during a state banquet where senior leadership would be present. Their plan was exposed in early July 1976 when they attempted to recruit an officer who remained loyal to the regime. The conspirators reportedly intended to restore General Tin U back to his posts, who was defense minister and army chief of staff before being dismissed ostensibly for his wife's corruption.

Following the plot's discovery, the primary conspirators were arrested. A military tribunal tried the officers for high treason, and Captain Ohn Kyaw Myint was hanged. Former General Tin U was also charged with misprision of treason for allegedly knowing of the plot but failing to report it.

== Background ==
General Ne Win had ruled Burma since overthrowing the civilian government of U Nu in a 1962 military coup. In 1974, a new constitution was adopted which formally established Burma as a one-party socialist state run by the Burma Socialist Programme Party (BSPP). By the mid-1970s, his "Burmese Way to Socialism" economic policy had led to great economic hardship and public discontent.

On March 6, 1976, General Tin U, the popular defense minister and army chief of staff, was unexpectedly forced to resign. The official reason given was his wife's involvement in corruption. He was replaced by the more "colourless" General San Yu, Ne Win's presumed heir apparent.

== Coup plot ==
Following the dismissal of General Tin U, Captain Ohn Kyaw Myint (aged 36), began organizing an assassination plot. He managed to recruit other conspirators, including 11 fellow captains and 3 majors. The conspirators were motivated by disdain for the failing socialist economic system and the economic hardships affecting junior officers.

Their plan was to strike during the annual Resistance Day banquet (later renamed Armed Forces Day) at the Presidential Palace in Yangon (then Rangoon), where Ne Win and other senior leadership would be present. The conspirators reportedly admired General Tin U and are believed to have intended to bring him back to power.

In early July 1976, the conspiracy came undone when the conspirators attempted to recruit an officer who remained loyal to the regime. This officer reported the conspiracy directly to Ne Win. The plot was exposed before it could be executed.

On July 2, 1976, security forces launched a massive roundup. Captain Ohn Kyaw Myint and the other conspirators were arrested. Hundreds of additional army officers were detained on suspicion of involvement or sympathy. In a desperate move, Captain Ohn Kyaw Myint attempted to seek asylum at the U.S. Embassy in Rangoon.

U.S. Ambassador David Osborn refused Captain Ohn Kyaw Myint sanctuary and also bypassed normal diplomatic channels. Rather than informing the Foreign Ministry, Osborn instead directly contacted the chief of military intelligence, Colonel Tin Oo, to inform him of the asylum seeker at his embassy. This was possibly to protect relations with the Ne Win regime.

== Post-coup ==
The government officially announced the discovery of the plot on July 20, 1976, in a broadcast on Rangoon radio. It confirmed the plot targeted President Ne Win, Defense Minister General San Yu, and the director of the National Intelligence Board, Colonel Tin Oo. The government stated the officers had been "prompted by personal admiration for unnamed persons and personal ambition." Three colonels were also arrested for "neglect of duty."

The military tribunal began on September 10, 1976. The accused were charged with high treason, encouraging treason, seeking to "ruin" the BSPP, and violations of the "Vanguard Party Safeguarding Law."

Former General Tin U was tried alongside the plotters on a charge of misprision of treason, accused of knowing about the plot but failing to report it. The prosecution alleged the conspirators' goal was to restore him to his former posts.

Captain Ohn Kyaw Myint was found guilty and executed by hanging. His last words on the gallows were reportedly, "I will never kneel down to your military boots."
