= Than Htike =

Burmese army general

Lieutenant General Than Htike
- သန်းထိုက်

Commander of the Northwestern Command
- Incumbent
- Assumed office 6 January 2022
- Leader: Min Aung Hlaing
- Preceded by: Phyo Thant

Personal details
- Born: Burma (now Myanmar)
- Education: Defence Services Academy

Military service
- Allegiance: Myanmar
- Branch/service: Myanmar Army
- Rank: Major General
- Commands: Northwestern Command (2022–present)

Lieutenant General Than Htike (Burmese: သန်းထိုက်, sometimes misspelt Than Hteik) (BC - 28146) is a Burmese military officer. He was appointed as the Commander of Myanmar's Northwestern Command based in Monywa, on 6 January 2022, succeeding Phyo Thant, who became deputy Minister for Border Affairs. Phyo Thant had overseen mass military casualties during his leadership of the command.

== Military career ==
Than Htike graduated from the 38th batch of the Defence Services Academy. Prior to his promotion as the commander of the Northwestern Command, he commanded military operations in Kalay.

The European Union sanctioned Than Htike in November 2022 for leading military forces who perpetrated serious human rights violations, including the Let Yet Kone massacre, and the burning of 20,000 homes in Sagaing Region since the February 2021 coup. In January 2023, he was sanctioned by the Canadian government.

In February 2023, Than Htike's troops launched the Sagaing offensive, killing dozens of civilians and displacing tens of thousands of villagers. Than Htike's 99th Light Infantry Division troops, dubbed the 'ogre column' by locals, killed at least 17 villagers during the Tar Taing massacre in March 2023.

== See also ==
- 2021–2023 Myanmar civil war
- State Administration Council
- Tatmadaw
