= Western Regional Military Command (Myanmar) =

Western Regional Military Command of Myanmar

- အနောက်ပိုင်းတိုင်းစစ်ဌာနချုပ်
- Emblem of the Western Regional Military Command
- Country: Myanmar
- Branch: Myanmar Army
- Type: Regional Military Command
- Role: Territorial defense, security, and military operations; management and supervision of command, operations, and logistical affairs of all units within the region.
- Nicknames: Nine Stars, Rakhine people

Commanders
- Regional Commander: Major General Kyaw Soe
- Deputy Regional Military Commander: Brigadier General Thaung Tun

Insignia
- Flag

The Western Regional Military Command (Burmese: အနောက်ပိုင်းတိုင်းစစ်ဌာနချုပ်); short form: Na Pha Kha (Burmese: နပခ) is a regional military headquarters of the Tatmadaw, based in Ann Township, Rakhine State. Its primary responsibilities include defense, security, and military operations in Rakhine State, the southern part of Chin State, and adjacent areas. In addition, the Western Regional Military Command is responsible for the military leadership, operations, and logistics of its subordinate units and attached/supporting troops within its jurisdiction. The command also implements orders and directives issued by higher military authorities, ensures their proper execution, and exercises supervision and oversight. The current commander of the Western Regional Military Command is Brigadier General Kyaw Swar Oo (Army ID: 26753) (Teza - 22).

== History ==
The Western Regional Military Command was established on September 10, 1972, in Sittwe, Rakhine State. On January 7, 1981, the Western Regional Military Command opened a border region command under the leadership of the Chief of Staff, which extended from the southern Natmyitwun boundary, bordering Myanmar-Bangladesh, and expanded northwards to the tripoint of Myanmar-Bangladesh-India. In the mid-1990s, the Western Regional Military Command was relocated from Sittwe to Ann, Rakhine State, where it replaced a regional military command focused on regional defense. A regional defense military command was also opened in Sittwe. The areas of control included the entire Rakhine State and the Paletwa Township in Chin State. Subordinate military units were deployed in southern Rakhine State and Chin State. The first commander was Brigadier General Hla Htun (Training Course-1), who took office with the number Kyei-5497.

== Structure ==
The command structure consists of 3 regional command headquarters, 43 infantry and mobile battalions, 26 administrative units, and 12 naval units, totaling a minimum of 87 military units. The military commands within the Naphak region, along with the subordinate commands, military strategies, and subordinate infantry/mobile units, are as follows:

=== Military Strategies ===
There is 1 base military strategy, 3 operational military strategies, and infantry/mobile units (including the Daks-Sittwe subordinate battalions).

== Military Operational Command Headquarters within the Regional Military Command Area ==
- No. (5) Military Operational Command Headquarters Tangokut
- No. (9) Military Operational Command Headquarters Kyauk Taw
- No. (15) Military Operational Command Headquarters Butheetaung

== Former Commanders of the Western Region Military Command ==
- Brigadier General Hla Htun (Kyit - 5497) (VTC - 1) (11 July 1972 - 18 March 1975)
- Major General Min Gawn (Kyit - 6315) (18 March 1975 - 23 March 1979)
- Major General Wan Tin (Kyit - 6138) (23 March 1979 - 14 January 1980)
- Major General Soe Myint (Kyit - 5482) (14 January 1980 - 22 July 1983)
- Brigadier General Myo Thin (Kyit - 6605) (VTC - 9) (22 July 1983 – Present)
- Brigadier General Win Myint (Kyit - 8809) (VTC - 28)
- Brigadier General Aung Thwe (Kyit - 9752) (VTC - 29)
- Brigadier General Maung Oo (Stath - 13)
- Major General Min Aung Hlaing (Kyit - 14232) (Stath - 19)
- Brigadier General Maung Shain (Kyit - 14756) (Stath - 20)
- Brigadier General Thawng Aye (Kyit - 14788) (Stath - 20)
- Brigadier General Soe Thein
- Brigadier General Htun Nay Lin (Kyit - 16354) (VTC - 61)
- Brigadier General Ko Ko Naing (Kyit 19000) (Stath - 26)
- Brigadier General Maung Maung Soe
- Major General Soe Tin Naing (Former Director of the Support and Transport Department)
- Brigadier General Phone Myat (Kyit - 20324) (VTC - 73) (Deputy Minister of the Ministry of Border Affairs)
- Brigadier General Thin Latt Oo (Kyit - 25099) (VTC - 73) (Former Military Academy Director)
- Brigadier General/Brigadier General Kyaw Swa Oo (Kyit - 26753) (Taza - 22) (Former Attack Strategy Academy Director) 2024–Present

== Collapse of the Military Headquarters ==
On 26 September 2024, the Arakan Army (AA) launched an attack on the Western Command and military camps in the Ann Township, Central Rakhine State. At 1:40 PM on 20 December 2024, the military headquarters was completely captured, and Brigadier General Thaung Tun, the deputy township administrator of Napaka (Ann), along with Brigadier General Kyaw Kyaw Than, the township chief officer, were arrested. This marks the second loss of a military headquarters in Myanmar's military history, following the collapse of the Northeastern Command.
