= Hla Min =

- လှမင်း

Minister of Defense of Myanmar
- In office 30 March 2011 – 7 September 2012
- Preceded by: Than Shwe
- Succeeded by: Wai Lwin

Chief of Bureau of Special Operations 3

South (Bago Division) Regional Commander

Personal details
- Born: 26 January 1958 (age 68) Burma
- Party: Union Solidarity and Development Party

Military service
- Allegiance: Myanmar
- Branch/service: Myanmar Army
- Rank: Lieutenant General
- Commands: South (Bago Division)

Lieutenant General Hla Min (Burmese: လှမင်း) was the minister of the Ministry of Defense, which oversees the Tatmadaw, the country's armed forces. He was appointed by the Pyidaungsu Hluttaw on 30 March 2011. He was reassigned to the military in September 2012. He was retired from army in August 2015 and joined the Union Solidarity and Development Party to contest 2015 Myanmar general election.
