= Tun Tun Naung =

Burmese military officer

- ထွန်းထွန်းနောင်

Minister for Home Affairs
- In office 31 January 2025 – 27 January 2026
- Preceded by: Yar Pyae
- Succeeded by: Phone Myat

Minister of Border Affairs
- In office 1 February 2021 – 31 January 2025
- Preceded by: Ye Aung
- Succeeded by: Yar Pyae

Member of the State Security and Peace Commission
- In office 31 July 2025 – 27 January 2026
- Leader: Min Aung Hlaing

Personal details
- Born: 30 April 1963 (age 63)
- Education: Defence Services Academy

Military service
- Allegiance: Myanmar
- Branch/service: Myanmar Army
- Rank: Lieutenant General

Tun Tun Naung (Burmese: ထွန်းထွန်းနောင်; born 30 April 1963) is a Burmese military officer and former Minister for Home Affairs of Myanmar. He was the former Union Minister of Border Affairs Tun Tun Naung is a career soldier, and currently holds the rank of Lieutenant General. As a Union Minister of Border Affairs, he was also a member of the Union Government and National Defence and Security Council.

== Career ==
Tun Tun Naung was born in 1963 and graduated from the 25th intake of Defence Service Academy. His colleagues from 25th intake are General Mya Tun Oo, member of SAC and Lieutenant-General Aung Lin Dwe, Secretary of SAC.

In 2010, he became the commander of 88th Light Infantry Division with the rank of Colonel. Later he became the commander of Eastern Central Command. In 2012 he became the commander of Northern Command with the rank Brigadier General and became the commander of Yangon Regional Command with the rank of Major General in 2014. In August 2015, he became the Chief of Bureau of Special Operations No (1), one of the high-level field units of Myanmar Army. In 2020 December, he was moved to Tatmadaw reserved force and became a member of Peace Negotiation Committee of Tatmadaw.

After 2021 coup, Tun Tun Naung was appointed as Union Minister for Ministry of Border Affairs. He is also a member of National Defence and Security Council. A cabinet reshuffle on 31 January 2025 would see Tun Tun Naung swap roles with Minister for Home Affairs Yar Pyae, with Tun Tun Naung becoming Minister for Home Affairs and Yar Pyae becoming Minister of Border Affairs.
