= Htin Latt Oo =

Burmese military officer

- ထင်လတ်ဦး

Commander of the Western Command
- Incumbent
- Assumed office 25 July 2020
- Leader: Min Aung Hlaing
- Preceded by: Phone Myat

Commandant of the Defence Services Academy
- In office 18 June 2018 – 24 July 2020
- Preceded by: Thaung Htike Shwe
- Succeeded by: Zaw Hein

Personal details
- Born: Burma (now Myanmar)

Military service
- Allegiance: Myanmar
- Branch/service: Myanmar Army
- Rank: Major General
- Commands: Western Command

Major-General Htin Latt Oo (Burmese: ထင်လတ်ဦး) is a Burmese military officer and current commander of Myanmar's Western Command, which encompasses Rakhine and Chin States.

== Military career ==
Htin Latt Oo served as the commandant of the Defence Services Academy until July 2020, when he was appointed as commander of Myanmar's Western Command, succeeding Phone Myat. He is currently leading the military's efforts to combat an insurgency by the Arakan Army in Rakhine State. He has been sanctioned by the European Union, Switzerland, and Canada for violating human rights and committing crimes against civilians in the Western Command.

== See also ==
- Conflict in Rakhine State (2016–present)
- State Administration Council
- Tatmadaw
