= Yar Pyae =

Burmese army general and minister of the Union Government Office

- ရာပြည့်

Union Minister for Border Affairs
- In office 31 January 2025 – 10 April 2026
- Appointed by: Min Aung Hlaing
- Preceded by: Tun Tun Naung

Union Minister for Home Affairs
- In office 25 September 2023 – 31 January 2025
- Deputy: Ni Lin Aung
- Preceded by: Soe Htut
- Succeeded by: Tun Tun Naung

Union Minister for Union Government Office
- In office 11 May 2021 – 25 September 2023
- Appointed by: Min Aung Hlaing
- Preceded by: Soe Htut

National Security Advisor to the State Administration Council
- In office 22 May 2021 – 7 January 2024
- Succeeded by: Moe Aung

Member of the State Security and Peace Commission
- In office 31 July 2025 – 10 April 2026
- Leader: Min Aung Hlaing
- Succeeded by: Than Maung

Union Minister for Defence
- Incumbent
- Assumed office 15 October 2026
- Preceded by: Htun Aung

Union Minister for Ethnic Affairs
- In office 31 January 2025 – 7 April 2026
- Preceded by: Khun Thant Zaw Htoo

Personal details
- Education: Defence Services Academy

Military service
- Allegiance: Myanmar
- Branch/service: Myanmar Army
- Rank: General

Yar Pyae (Burmese: ရာပြည့်; born Myanmar) is a Myanmar Army general who is currently serving as the Union Minister for Defence. He formerly served as the National Security Advisor among other positions.

== Early life and education ==
Yar Pyae graduated from the 22nd intake of the Defence Services Academy, in the same cohort as Soe Win, another general in the Myanmar Army and the former Deputy Prime Minister of Myanmar.

== Military career ==
In November 2020, he chaired the Peace Negotiation Committee (PNC) of the Defence Services and also headed the Joint Ceasefire Monitoring Committee (JCMC).

In the aftermath of the 2021 Myanmar coup d'état, Yar Pyae has led efforts to dissuade major ethnic armed organisations, including United Wa State Army and the Shan State Progress Party, from joining the resistance movement and the National Unity Government. As the chairman of the National Solidarity and Peace-making Committee (NSPC), he met with the Democratic Karen Buddhist Army (DKBA) and the Karen National Union/Karen National Liberation Army (Peace Council) at the National Reconciliation and Peace Center in Nay Pyi Taw on 26 April 2021.

In August 2021, Sun Guoxiang, China's special envoy for Asian Affairs, met with Yar Pyae (along with military ruler Min Aung Hlaing and foreign minister Wunna Maung Lwin) and “exchanged views with them on the political landscape in Myanmar”.

In September 2023, as part of a cabinet reshuffle, Yar Pyae was appointed by the junta as minister for home affairs, replacing Soe Htut, who was sacked for corruption.

In January 2024, as part of a cabinet reshuffle, Yar Pyae was removed from his position as National Security Advisor to the chairman of the State Administration Council and replaced with Admiral Moe Aung. Another cabinet reshuffle on 31 January 2025 would see Yar Pyae swap roles with Minister of Border Affairs Tun Tun Naung, with Yar Pyae becoming Minister of Border Affairs and Tun Tun Naung becoming Minister for Home Affairs.
