= Wai Lwin =

Myanmar Army officer

- ဝေလွင်
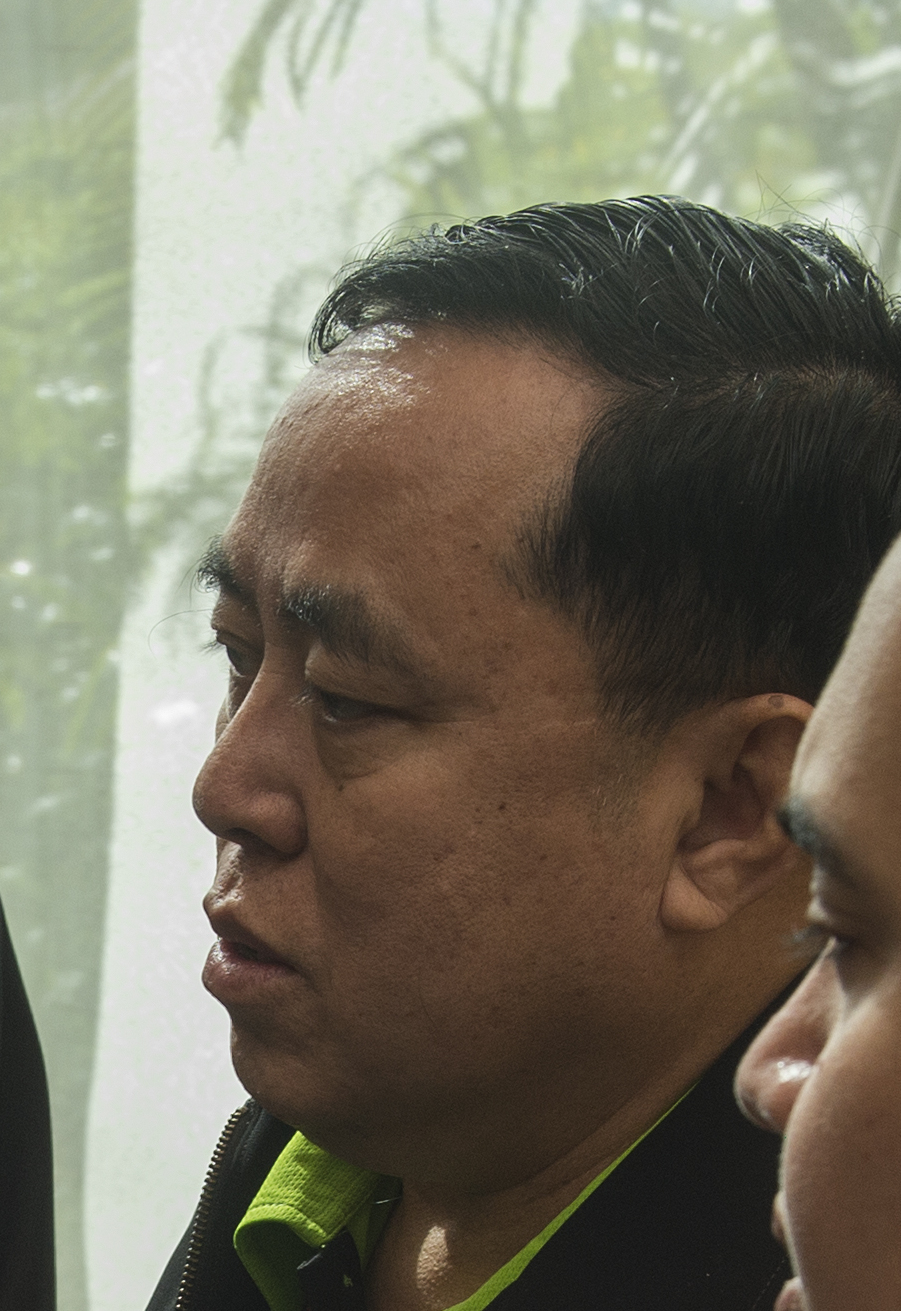
- Wai Lwin in 2013

Minister of Defence
- In office September 2012 – 13 August 2015
- Preceded by: Hla Min
- Succeeded by: Sein Win

Member of Yangon Region Hluttaw
- In office 12 July 2012 – September 2012

Personal details
- Born: 4 November 1954 (age 71) Kyaunggon, Burma
- Party: Union Solidarity and Development Party
- Spouse: Swe Swe Oo
- Children: Wai Phyo Aung, Wai Phyo, Lwin Yamin
- Education: Defence Services Academy

Military service
- Allegiance: Burma
- Branch/service: Myanmar Army
- Rank: Lieutenant General

Wai Lwin (Burmese: ဝေလွင်) is a retired senior Myanmar Army officer, who served as the Minister of Defence from September 2012 to 13 August 2015. He previously served as a military representative of Yangon Region Hluttaw. He is the Central Executive Committee member of the Union Solidarity and Development Party.

== Biography ==
Wai Lwin was born on 4 November 1954 in Kyaunggon, Ayeyarwady Region. He graduated in 1976 from the 16th intake of the Defence Services Academy. He served as a former deputy commander of Yangon Region from 2003 to 2006 and as military commander of the Naypyidaw region from May 2006 to July 2012. In July 2012, he was appointed into the Yangon Region Hluttaw to replace Captain Lin Lin Kyaw, becoming the highest-ranked military member serving in a regional parliament.

He was on the EU blacklist from December 2003 until May 2012. Wai Lwin was temporarily suspended in August 2011 for suspicions of corruption and is a close associate of Than Shwe, former chairman of the State Peace and Development Council.

Wai Lwin is married to Swe Swe Oo, and the couple have children, namely Wai Phyo Aung, Wai Phyo, and Lwin Yamin.
