= Phone Myat =

Burmese military officer

Lieutenant general Phone Myat
- ဖုန်းမြတ်

Union Minister for Border Affairs
- Incumbent
- Assumed office 10 April 2026
- President: Min Aung Hlaing
- Preceded by: Yar Pyae

Union Minister for Home Affairs
- In office 27 January 2026 – 10 April 2026
- Leader: Nyo Saw
- Preceded by: Tun Tun Naung
- Succeeded by: Lt. Gen. Nyunt Win Swe

Member of the State Security and Peace Commission
- In office 17 January 2026 – 10 April 2026
- Preceded by: Tun Tun Naung
- Succeeded by: Commission abolished

Commander of Bureau of Special Operations (BSO) No. 3
- Incumbent
- Assumed office April 2021
- Leader: Min Aung Hlaing

Deputy Minister of Border Affairs
- In office July 2020 – 2021
- Succeeded by: Than Htut

Commander of the Western Command
- In office May 2019 – July 2020
- Preceded by: Soe Tint Naing
- Succeeded by: Htin Latt Oo

Personal details
- Born: c. 1964 (age 61–62) Burma (now Myanmar)
- Education: Officers Training School, Bahtoo
- Cabinet: Cabinet of Nyo Saw; Second Min Aung Hlaing cabinet

Military service
- Allegiance: Myanmar
- Branch/service: Myanmar Army
- Rank: Lieutenant General
- Commands: Western Command; Northwestern Command

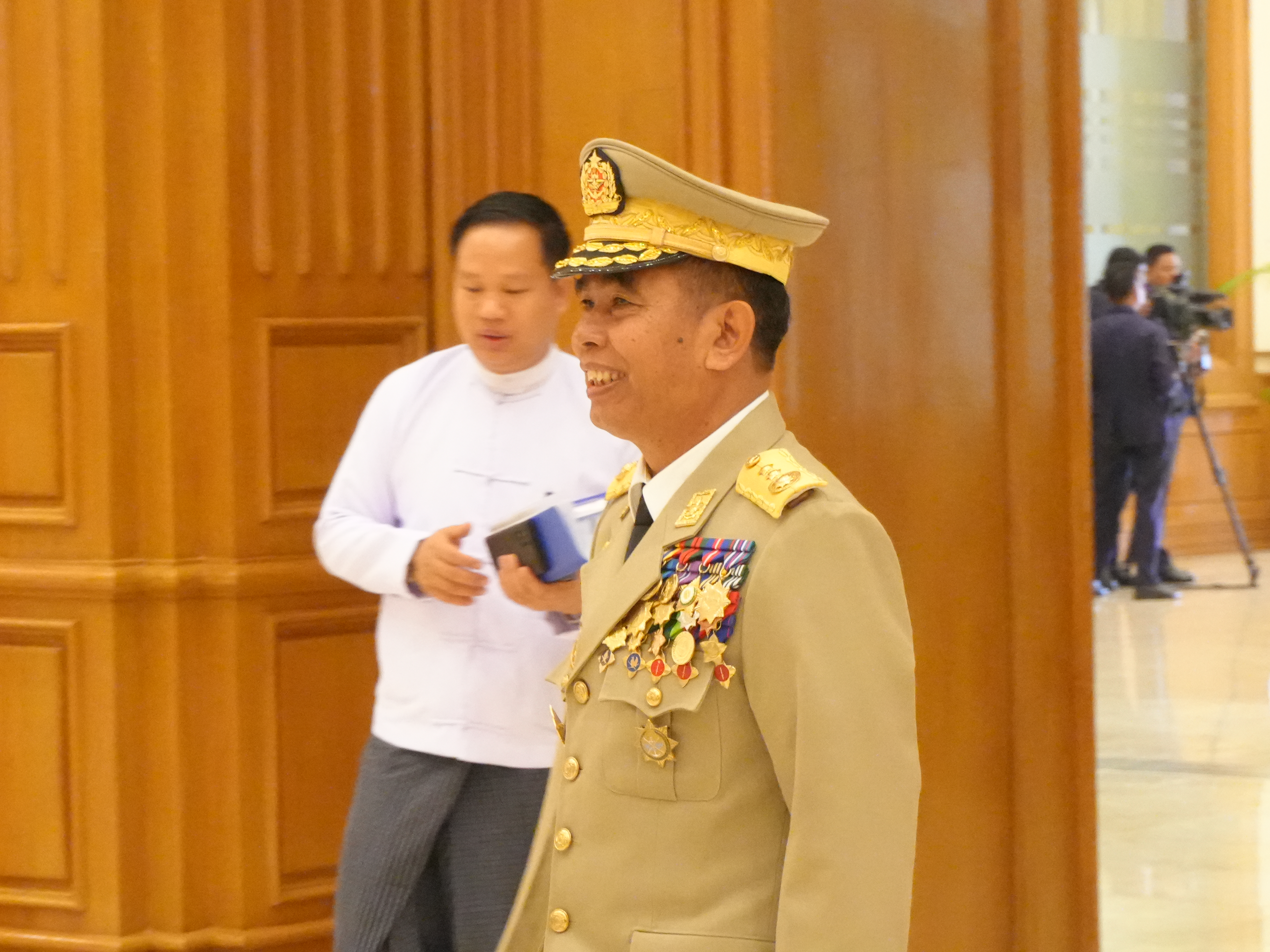
Phone Myat in 2026

Lieutenant General Phone Myat (Burmese: ဖုန်းမြတ်; born c. 1964) is a Burmese military officer and current Union Minister for Border Affairs, a position he took since January 2026. He formerly served as the Union Minister for Home Affairs.

He was commander of the Bureau of Special Operations (BSO) No. 3, which encompasses military forces in Ayeyarwady, Bago and Magway Regions, and Rakhine and Chin States. He has been sanctioned by the European Union, Switzerland, and Canada for violating human rights and committing crimes against civilians in the aftermath of the 2021 Myanmar coup d'état.

== Military career ==
Thet Pon graduated from the Officers Training School, Bahtoo. He served as the commander of the Northeastern Command from 2017 to 2018, the Western Command from May 2019 to July 2020, and was appointed as a deputy minister for border affairs from 2020 to 2021. He was appointed as commander of BSO No. 3 in April 2021. As of October 2022, he administered the Office of the Commander-in-Chief.

== See also ==
- 2021–2023 Myanmar civil war
- State Administration Council
- Tatmadaw
