= Tay Zar Kyaw =

Burmese army officer

Tayza Kyaw
- တေဇကျော်

Commander of the Bureau of Special Operations No. 1
- Leader: Min Aung Hlaing

Personal details
- Born: 1964 (age 61–62) Latha Township, Yangon, Burma (now Myanmar)
- Education: Officers Training School, Bahtoo

Military service
- Allegiance: Myanmar
- Branch/service: Myanmar Army
- Rank: Lieutenant General

Lieutenant General Tayza Kyaw (Burmese: တေဇာကျော်, also spelt Tay Zar Kyaw) (BC - 20278), is a Burmese military officer known for his role in leading Operation Anawrahta, the military's attempt to suppress resistance forces in Upper Myanmar in the aftermath of the 2021 Myanmar coup d'état.

== Military career ==
Tayza Kyaw graduated from the 73rd intake of the Officers Training School, Bahtoo. He is the incumbent commander of Bureau of Special Operations No. 6. In February 2022, he was sanctioned by the European Union for committing military atrocities and abuses in the aftermath of the 2021 Myanmar coup d'état.

== See also ==
- 2021 Myanmar coup d'état
- State Administration Council
- Tatmadaw
