= Ba Htoo =

Burmese army officer (1916–1945)

- ဗထူး
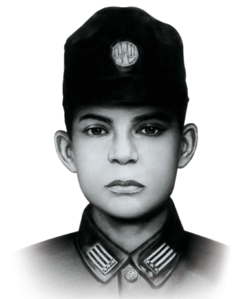
- Born: 1916
- Died: 2 June 1945 (aged 28–29); Aungban, Shan States, British Burma
- Occupation: Colonel in the Burma National Army

Colonel Ba Htoo (Burmese: ဗထူး; 1916 – 2 June 1945) was an officer in the Burma National Army. He is perhaps most well known for his leadership in driving out Japanese forces from Upper Myanmar during World War II. Having declared war on the Japanese forces on 8 March 1945, then-Major Ba Htoo took victory in around 20 battles, which alongside a successive campaign launched by General Aung San on 27 March and assaults by the Allied Forces, ultimately resulted in the defeat and expulsion of Japanese forces from Myanmar and the end of over 100 years of colonial rule. However, as Major Ba Htoo and his forces drove the Japanese from Mandalay and into southern Shan State, he contracted severe malaria and, aged 29, died from the disease in the town of Aungban, Shan State, 2 June 1945. Unbeknownst to Ba Htoo at the time of his death, he had been promoted to the rank of Colonel by General Aung San, as outlined in a letter.

== Legacy ==
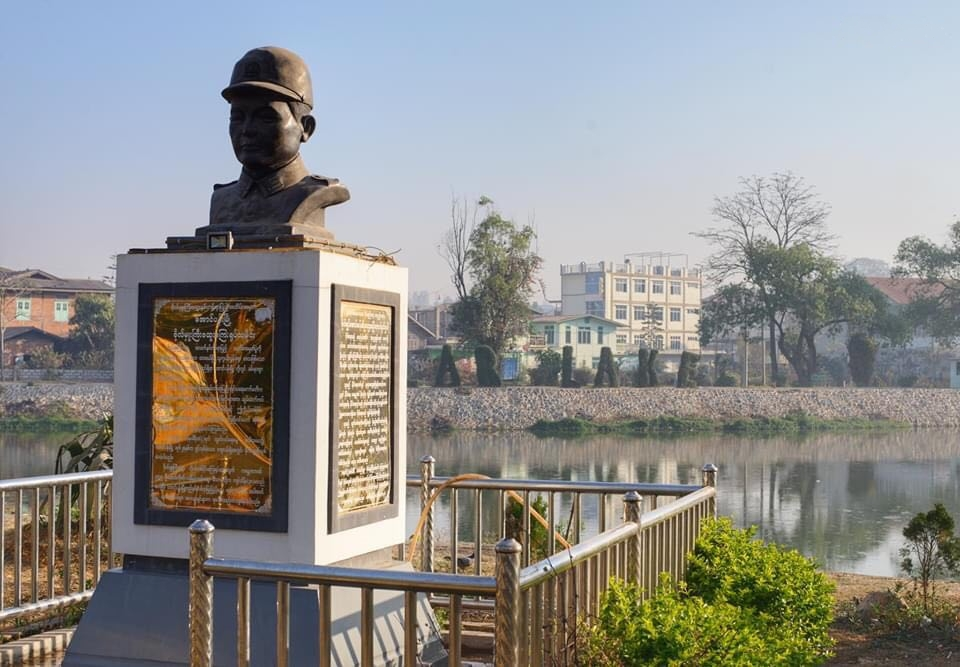
Bust of Ba Htoo in Aungban

A monument commemorating Colonel Ba Htoo and the other Burmese soldiers that fell during the war in Upper Myanmar was erected in Aungban 13 days after the Colonel's death. A sports stadium, Bahtoo Memorial Stadium, in Mandalay, Myanmar, and Major Ba Htoo Bridge, which connects North Okkalapa and North Dagon, are named in honour of the colonel.

In 1953, Bahtoo Station, a military base near Lawksawk in southern Shan State, was established in his honor.
