= Toe Yi =

Burmese military officer

- တိုးရီ

Deputy Minister of Home Affairs
- Incumbent
- Assumed office 3 February 2023
- Leader: Min Aung Hlaing
- Preceded by: Soe Tint Naing

Deputy Chief of Military Security Affairs

Personal details
- Born: Burma (now Myanmar)
- Education: Officers Training School, Bahtoo

Military service
- Allegiance: Myanmar
- Rank: Major General

Major-General Toe Yi (Burmese: တိုးရီ) is a Burmese military officer who is currently serving as Deputy Minister of Home Affairs, and previously served as a military intelligence chief responsible for the State Administration Council's interrogation centres.

== Early life and education ==
Toe Yi graduated from the Officers Training School, Bahtoo in 1989, alongside Ye Win Oo, as part of the 77th intake.

== Military career ==
Toe Yi advanced his career by becoming the deputy head of the Office of the Chief of Military Security Affairs (OCMSA), the country's intelligence agency, where he was responsible for domestic intelligence operations. In the aftermath of the 2021 Myanmar coup d'état, OCMSA carried out operations against Kyaw Min Yu and Phyo Zayar Thaw, both of whom were later executed in July 2022 for anti-coup activities. In January 2023, the military junta conferred the title of "Zaya Kyawhtin" to Toe Yi. On 3 February 2023, he was promoted to become Deputy Minister of Home Affairs under Soe Htut.

== See also ==
- State Administration Council
- Tatmadaw
