= Ohn Kyaw Myint =

Captain Ohn Kyaw Myint (Burmese: အုန်းကျော်မြင့်; died July 27, 1977) was a Burmese army officer who was well known for his unsuccessful coup attempt against the Myanmar government led by General Ne Win.

== Military career ==
Ohn Kyaw Myint graduated from Rangoon University. He had completed OTS (Officer Training School), 29 Intake with the best cadet award. He served as a staff officer under General Kyaw Htin, the commander in chief of the Burmese armed forces.

== Trial ==
Ohn Kyaw Myint plotted a coup attempt with other young officers and the plot was uncovered by Military Intelligence. He was found guilty at the trial and hanged on July 27, 1977. Senior General Than Shwe, Chairman of State Peace and Development Council, who was a junior officer at the time of the trial, stood as a witness.
