= Bahtoo Station =

Military base in Shan State, Myanmar

Ba Htoo Station
- ဗထူးတပ်မြို့
- Southern Shan State; Near Lawksawk (Yatsauk) in Myanmar

Site information
- Owner: Ministry of Defence (Myanmar)

Location
- Coordinates: 21.278276876840355°N 96.85469701569245°E

Site history
- Built: November 1953; 72 years ago

Ba Htoo Station (Burmese: ဗထူးတပ်မြို့), also called Bahtoo Station and Fort Ba Htoo, is a major military base located near Lawksawk (also known as Yatsauk in Burmese) in southern Shan State, Myanmar (Burma). Named after Ba Htoo, a colonial military hero, the base was established by the Burmese Armed Forces in November 1953 to house the families of Burmese military officers and provide training to officers. The Army Officers Training School is located on the base.
