= Officers Training School, Bahtoo =

Army Officers Training School, Bahtoo
- တပ်မတော်(ကြည်း) ဗိုလ်သင်တန်းကျောင်း (ဗထူး)
- Bahtoo Station, Shan State; Myanmar

Information
- Other name: OTS
- Type: Military academy
- Established: 1948; 78 years ago
- Authority: Ministry of Defence (Myanmar)
- Language: Burmese
- Affiliation: Myanmar Armed Forces

The Army Officers Training School, Bahtoo (Burmese: တပ်မတော်(ကြည်း) ဗိုလ်သင်တန်းကျောင်း (ဗထူး), abbreviated OTS) is an officer candidate school for the Myanmar Army located in Bahtoo Station, Shan State, Myanmar. The Commandant of the OTS is Brigadier General Myo Zaw Win (BC - 27081). OTS trains army warrant officers and non-commissioned officers, and is one of the country's main institutions for training army officers, along with the Defence Services Academy (DSA). Coursework at OTS typically spans nine months, and graduating cadets receive army commissions. OTS cadets generally have more experience in civilian life than other counterparts.

== History ==
The predecessor to the OTS was founded in Mingaladon Township, Rangoon (now Yangon) by the Imperial Japanese Army on 20 August 1942, becoming the first military training school in the country. After achieving independence in 1948, Myanmar's military established OTS in Maymyo (now Pyin Oo Lwin), near Mandalay. OTS was relocated to Bahtoo Station in Shan State, to make way for the Defence Services Academy, which would become the country's premier military academy. Since 1988, OTS has largely admitted cadets who have already earned undergraduate degrees. Political observers have noted long-standing power struggles between OTS and DSA. In 2016, 7% (4) of the military-appointed delegates to the Amyotha Hluttaw, the upper house of Myanmar's national legislature were OTS graduates, while none of the military-appointed delegates to the Pyithu Hluttaw, the lower house of Myanmar's national legislature were OTS graduates.

== Notable alumni ==
- Kyi Maung, 1st intake
- Tin Oo, 3rd intake
- Than Shwe, 9th intake
- Khin Nyunt, 25th intake
- Ohn Kyaw Myint, 29th Intake
- Sein Win, 54th intake
- Teza Kyaw, 73rd intake
- Ye Win Oo, 77th intake
- Toe Yi, 77th intake
