= Ministry of Border Affairs (Myanmar) =

Government ministry of Myanmar

- နယ်စပ်ရေးရာ ဝန်ကြီးဌာန

Agency overview
- Preceding agency: Ministry of Progress of Border Areas, National Races and Development Affairs
- Jurisdiction: Government of Myanmar
- Headquarters: Naypyidaw; 19.792997°N 96.1206306°E
- Minister responsible: Lt-Gen Phone Myat
- Deputy Minister responsible: Phyo Thant
- Website: www.mba.gov.mm

The Ministry of Border Affairs (Burmese: နယ်စပ်ရေးရာ ဝန်ကြီးဌာန, abbreviated MBA), formerly Ministry of Progress of Border Areas, National Races and Development Affairs is a ministry in the Government of Myanmar which is responsible for the development of border areas and national races. According to the 2008 Constitution of Myanmar, the Union Minister of Border Affairs is a member of National Defence and Security Council.

== Departments ==
- Union Minister Office
- Department for Development for Border Areas and National Races
- Education and Training Department

== List of Union Ministers (Mar 2011 - Present) ==
1. Thein Htay (30 March 2011 – 13 February 2013)
2. Thet Naing Win (February 2013 – 13 August 2015)
3. Kyaw Swe (13 August 2015 – 30 March 2016)
4. Ye Aung (30 March 2016 – 1 February 2021)
5. Tun Tun Naung (1 February 2021 – present)
