= Northeastern Regional Military Command (Myanmar) =

Northeastern Regional Military Command of Myanmar

- အရှေ့မြောက်တိုင်းစစ်ဌာနချုပ်
- Emblem of the Northeastern Regional Military Command
- Founded: 27 July 1972
- Country: Myanmar
- Branch: Myanmar Army
- Type: Regional Military Command (RMC)
- Role: Managing and overseeing territorial defense, security, military operations, and the command, administration, and logistical matters of all troops within the region.
- Nickname: Red Sun

Commanders
- Commander: Brigadier General Soe Hlaing
- Deputy Commander: Brigadier General Tin Tun Aung
- Regional Commander: Brigadier General Thant Htin Soe

Insignia
- Flag

The Northeastern Regional Military Command (Burmese: အရှေ့မြောက်တိုင်းစစ်ဌာနချုပ်); short form: Ya Ma Kha (Burmese: ရမခ) is a military headquarters based in Lashio, Shan State (Northern). The primary responsibility of the Regional Military Headquarters is the defense, security, and military operations concerning the northern region of Shan State and its bordering areas. In addition, it is tasked with managing the military, operational, and logistical activities of its subordinate units and other staff/regimental units within the region, as well as providing instructions and overseeing directives from higher commands. Since July 17, 2024, Brigadier General Soe Hlaing has been serving as the commander of the Northeast Regional Military Command. On August 3, 2024, the Northeast Regional Military Command was completely taken over by the Myanmar National Democratic Alliance Army (MNDAA) and allied militia groups. In 1949, the former Northern Regional Military Headquarters, based in May City, was attacked and seized by the Karen National Defense Organization (KNDO), marking the first military headquarters in Myanmar to fall after 75 years. With the mutual ceasefire agreement brokered by China, MNDAA retreated from Lashio in April 17, followed by re-entry of thousands of soldiers from Northeastern Regional Military Command into city in 22 April.

== History ==
In 1961, the Eastern Regional Military Command was established in Taunggyi. In the 1970s, due to the intensified activities of the Burma Communist Party in northern Shan State, the Strategic Operations Command was opened in Lashio in June 1970. The Strategic Operations Command directly controlled the troops and military operations in northern Shan State. To better confront the increasingly powerful movements of the Burma Communist Party, on July 27, 1972, northern Shan State was separated from the control of the Rakhine Military Command and the Northeast Regional Military Command was established in Lashio. At that time, the commander of the region was Major General Aye Ko.

== Structure ==
Under the command of the Northeast Regional Military Command, there are (1) regional command headquarters, (3) base strategy units, (2) operational strategy units, and (16) foot/motorized infantry divisions under its command.

=== Northeast regional military command office ===
1. Provincial Head's Office
2. Deputy Provincial Head's Office
3. Provincial Commander's Office
  1. Military Commander (Brigadier General) Office
    1. Military Commander (First Class) Office
      1. Operations Department
      2. Responsibilities and Training Department
    2. Military Commander (First Class) (Military Security Department) Office
    3. Military Commander (First Class) (Civilian Military Department) Office
  2. Chief Officer (Brigadier General) (Military Affairs Department) Office
    1. Chief Officer (First Class) (Finance Department) Office
    2. Chief Officer (First Class) (Records Department) Office
  3. Chief Officer (Brigadier General) (Military Support Department) Office
    1. Chief Officer (First Class) (Filling and Maintenance Department) Office
    2. Chief Officer (First Class) (Supply and Transportation Department) Office
4. Headquarters Office

=== Regional Command Headquarters (Lauk Kone) ===
The Regional Command Headquarters (Lauk Kone) is led by the Regional Command Headquarters Commander (Lauk Kone), and under its command, there are 9 battalions of Foot and Fast Troops.

=== Base Military Strategy Group (Kut Khaing) ===
1. Khlayar/Khamyar - 3 Battalions

=== Base Military Strategy Group (Kwan Lone) ===
1. Khlayar/Khamyar - 3 Battalions

=== Base Military Strategy Group (Tan Yan) ===
1. Khamyar 523
2. Khamyar 326

Khlayar/Khamyar - 3 Battalions

=== Active No. 1 Military Strategy Group ===
1. Khlayar/Khamyar - 4 Battalions

=== Active No. 2 Military Strategy Group ===
1. Khlayar/Khamyar - 3 Battalions

== Military Operations Command Headquarters within Provincial Military District ==
1. Operation Command Headquarters No. (1)

== Military District Headquarters within Provincial Military Command ==
1. Foot Infantry Division Command No. (16)

== Former Regional Commanders of the Northern Eastern Military Command ==
1. Brigadier General Aye Ko (Code - 6133) (11 July 1972 to 8 March 1974)
2. Brigadier General Tin Sein (Code - 6181) (8 March 1974 to 5 April 1976)
3. Brigadier General Hla Oo (Code - 6214) (5 April 1976 to 24 November 1977)
4. Brigadier General Min Naung (Code - 6129) (24 November 1977 to 8 April 1978)
5. Brigadier General Aye San (Code - 6144) (8 April 1978 to 1 September 1980)
6. Brigadier General Myint Lwin (Code - 6608) (1 September 1980 to 19 August 1981)
7. Brigadier General Chit Swe (Code - 6463) (Veteran - 8) (19 August 1981 to 28 March 1983)
8. Major General Sein Aung (Code - 6740) (Veteran - 10) (28 March 1983 to 4 November 1985)
9. Brigadier General Tun Shwe (Code - 7505)
10. Brigadier General Maung Aye (Code - 7875) (Status - 1)
11. Colonel Maung Thin (Code - 7600) (Veteran - 18)
12. Colonel Aye Kyaw
13. Colonel Tin Ngwe
14. Colonel Thiha Thuya Tin Aung Myint Oo (Code - 11715) (Status - 12)
15. Colonel Myint Hlain (Code - ) (Status - 17)
16. Colonel Aung Than Htwe (Code - 14751) (Status - 20)
17. Colonel Aung Kyaw Zaw (Code - 17444) (Status - 24)
18. Colonel Aung Soe (Code - 18886) (Status - 23)
19. Colonel Phone Myat (Code - 20324) (Veteran - 73)
20. Colonel Khine Hlain (Code - 22383) (Teza - 17)
21. Colonel Aung Zaw Aye (Code - 20175) (Status - 28)
22. Colonel Hla Moe (Code - 29353) (Status - 39)

=== Current Commander ===
1. Colonel Nain Nain Oo (Code - 25089) (Status - 35) (Currently serving as the Second Chief Commander)

== Battles and skirmishes ==
- On July 3, 2024, a combined force of the Myanmar National Democratic Alliance Army (MNDAA) launched an attack on military camps near Lashio in the northeastern regional military headquarters (RMC), where the Eastern Command (RMC) is located.
- On July 14, 2024, early in the morning, the military carried out a bombing attack in Laukkaing city. Later that day, the MNDAA announced a ceasefire from July 14 to July 18 in respect of a four-day meeting of the Central Committee of the Chinese Communist Party, declaring a ceasefire in response to respect for the meeting and concerns.
- Despite the ceasefire, the MNDAA announced that they had captured a significant military weapon, the Khmara 507, at the northeastern regional military headquarters.
- The military also launched a bombing attack in Theni city, controlled by the MNDAA. In response, the MNDAA declared that they would continue their ceasefire from July 19 to July 31, 2024.
- On August 1, 2024, the MNDAA entered and attacked the military's medical facility, resulting in the deaths of more than 100 individuals, including child patients, doctors, nurses, and injured persons. Another 200 people were captured.
- On August 3, 2024, the MNDAA announced that they had successfully captured the northeastern regional military headquarters.
- On August 5, 2024, the head of the State Administration Council’s media group, General Zaw Min Tun, stated that several senior officials, including those from the lost northeastern military headquarters, had been arrested.
- On August 30, 2024, the Myanmar Air Force began bombing the MNDAA-controlled city of Lashio.
- On September 22, 2024, the military issued a statement condemning the damage caused by the MNDAA's bombing, claiming it harms peace.
- On September 18, 2024, the MNDAA announced that it would not separate from the nation. National Unity Government (NUG) will remain united with the country.
