= Myanmar Army =

Ground forces branch of the armed forces of Myanmar

Defence Services (Army)
- Tatmadaw (Kyi) တပ်မတော် (ကြည်း) (Burmese)
- Emblem of the Defence Services (Army) (Note: This representative emblem is also the Shoulder Sleeve Insignia (SSI) of the Office of Commander-in-Chief (Army).)
- Founded: 1945; 81 years ago
- Country: Myanmar
- Type: Army
- Role: Ground warfare
- Size: Active personnel: 150,000; Reserve personnel: 20,000; Paramilitary personnel: 55,000; Draftees: ~30,000 (estimates of the ninth batch of the service); Reserves: Border Guard Forces (23 battalions) People's militia groups (46 groups) University Training Corps (5 corps)
- Part of: Myanmar Defence Services
- Mottos: ရဲသော်မသေ၊ သေသော်ငရဲမလား။ ("If you are brave, you will not die, and if you die, hell will not come to you."); ရဲရဲတက်၊ ရဲရဲတိုက်၊ ရဲရဲချေမှုန်း။ ("Bravely charge, bravely fight, and bravely annihilate."); လေ့လာပါ၊ လေ့ကျင့်ပါ၊ လိုက်နာပါ။ ("Study, Practice and Follow Up."); တပ်မတော်အင်အားရှိမှ တိုင်းပြည်အင်အားရှိမည်။ ("Only when the military is strong will the nation be strong."); အသက်သွေးချွေး စဉ်မနှေးပေးဆပ်သည်မှာတပ်မတော်ပါ။ ("Never hesitating always ready to sacrifice blood and sweat is the Tatmadaw.)"; တပ်နှင့်ပြည်သူမြဲကြည်ဖြူ သွေးခွဲလာသူတို့ရန်သူ။ ("Military and the people join in eternal unity, anyone attempting to divide them is our enemy."); တစ်သွေးတည်း၊ အသံတစ်သံ၊ အမိန့်တစ်ခု။ ("One blood, one voice, one command."); တပ်မတော်သည်အမျိုးသားရေးကိုဘယ်တော့မှသစ္စာမဖောက်။ ("The military shall never betray the national cause."); တပ်နှင့်ပြည်သူ လက်တွဲကူပြည်ထောင်စုဖြိုခွဲသူမှန်သမျှချေမှုန်းကြ။ ("Military and the people, cooperate and crush all those harming the union."); စည်းကမ်းရှိမှတိုးတက်မည်။ (Only when there is discipline will there be progress."); အမိနိုင်ငံတော်ကိုချစ်ပါ။ ဥပဒေကိုလးစားပါ။ ("Love your motherland. Respect the law.")
- Colours: Olive green; Light green; Red; Desert
- Anniversaries: 27 March 1945
- Engagements: Indochina theater of World War II; Burma campaign; Japanese invasion; Allies recapture; Internal conflict in Myanmar; Rohingya conflict; Kuomintang invasion; Communist insurgency; Karen conflict; Battle of Insein; Maw Pokay incident; Siege of Manerplaw; Battle of Kawmoora; Border skirmishes; Kachin conflict; 2009 Kokang incident; 2015 Kokang offensive; Muse offensive; Conflict in Rakhine State (2016–present); Operation Sunrise (2019); Myanmar civil war (2021–present); Chin theater; Battle of Mindat; Battle of Thantlang; Battle of Loikaw (2021); Battle of Loikaw (2022); Operation 1027; Battle of Laukkai; Battle of Maungdaw; Operation Taungthaman; Rakhine offensive; Kachin offensive(2024); Battle of Kawkareik; Siege of Myawaddy

Commanders
- Commander-in-Chief (Army): General Kyaw Swar Lin
- Notable commanders: Major General Aung San; General Ne Win; General Bo Let Ya; Lieutenant General Smith Dun; General Kyaw Htin; General San Yu; General Thura Tin Oo; General Khin Nyunt; Vice-Senior General Maung Aye; General Kyaw Swar Lin; Senior General Saw Maung; Senior General Than Shwe; Senior General Min Aung Hlaing

Insignia
- Flag of the Defence Services (Army)

- Shoulder sleeve of Office of the Commander-in-Chief (Army)

- Shoulder sleeve of infantry and light infantry

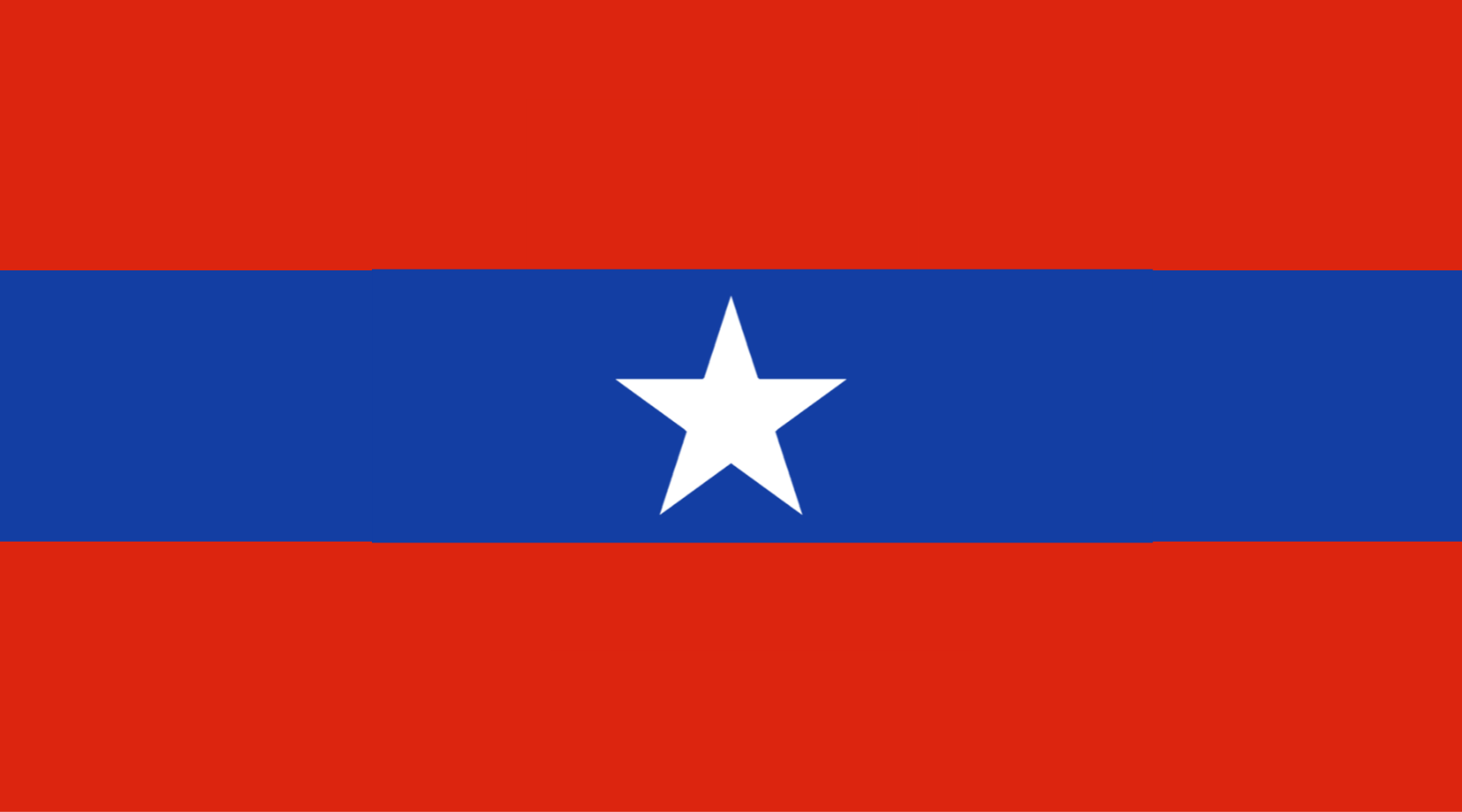
- Former flag (1948–1994)

The Myanmar Army, officially the Defence Services (Army) (Burmese: တပ်မတော်(ကြည်း), romanized: Tatmadaw (Kyi); pronounced [taʔmədɔ̀ tɕí]), is the largest branch of the Myanmar Defence Services (Tatmadaw), the combined military of Myanmar, and has the primary responsibility of conducting land-based military operations. Its official name was Burma Army (Burmese: ဗမာ့တပ်မတော်, romanized: Bama Tatmadaw) before being renamed to Defence Services (Army) (Burmese: တပ်မတော် (ကြည်းတပ်), romanized: Tatmadaw (Kyi Tat)) in 1956. The Myanmar Army maintains the second largest active force in Southeast Asia after the People's Army of Vietnam. It has clashed against ethnic and political insurgents since its inception in 1948.

The force is headed by the Commander-in-Chief (Army), currently General Kyaw Swar Lin, concurrently the Deputy Commander-in-Chief of the Defence Services. The highest rank in the Myanmar Army is Senior General, equivalent to field marshal in Western armies.

In 2011, following a transition from military government to civilian parliamentary government, the Myanmar Army imposed a military draft on all citizens: all males from age 18 to 35 and all females from 18 to 27 years of age can be drafted into military service for two years as enlisted personnel in time of national emergency. The ages for professionals are up to 45 for men and 35 for women for three years service as commissioned and non-commissioned officers.

The Government Gazette reported that 1.8 trillion kyat (about US$2 billion), or 23.6 per cent of the 2011 budget was for military expenditures.

== Brief history ==
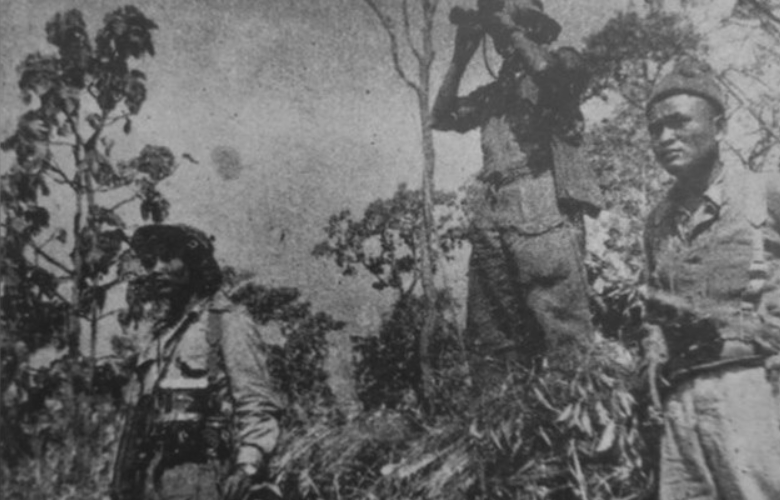
Burmese troops surveying the Burma–China border, circa April 1954, on the lookout for Chinese Nationalist troops who fled to Burma following their defeat in the Chinese Civil War.

=== British and Japanese rule ===
In the late 1930s, during the period of British rule, a few Myanmar organizations or parties formed an alliance named Burma's Htwet Yet (Liberation) Group, one of them being Dobama Asiayone. Since most of the members were Communist, they wanted help from Chinese Communists; but when Thakhin Aung San and a partner secretly went to China for help, they only met with a Japanese general and made an alliance with Japanese Army. In the early 1940s, Aung San and other 29 participants secretly went for the military training under Japanese Army and these 30 people are later known as the "30 Comrades" in Myanmar history and can be regarded as the origin of the modern Myanmar Army.

When the Japanese invasion of Burma was ready, the 30 Soldiers recruited Myanmar people in Thailand and founded Burmese Independence Army (BIA), which was the first phase of Myanmar Army. In 1942, BIA assisted Japanese Army in their conquest of Burma, which succeeded. After that, Japanese Army changed BIA to Burmese Defense Army (BDA), which was the second phase. In 1943, Japan officially declared Burma an independent nation, but the new Burmese government did not possess de facto rule over the country.

While assisting the British Army in 1945, the Myanmar Army entered into its third phase, as the Patriotic Burmese Force (PBF), and the country became under British rule again. Afterwards, the structure of the army fell under British authority; hence, for those who were willing to serve the nation but not in that army, General Aung San organized the People's Comrades Force.

=== Post-Independence era ===
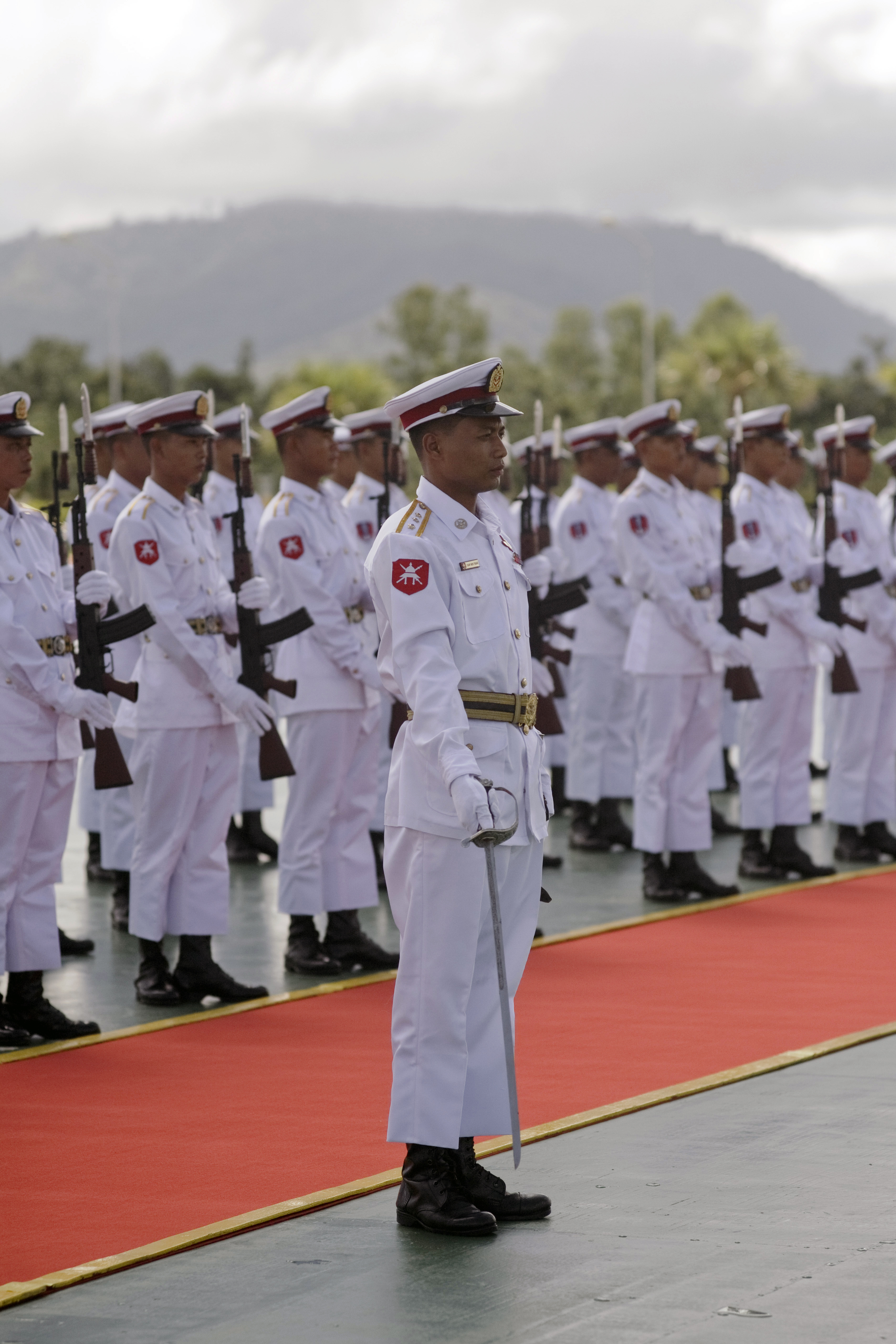
Myanmar Army Honour Guards saluting the arrival of the Thai delegation in October 2010

At the time of Myanmar's independence in 1948, the Tatmadaw was weak, small and disunited. Cracks appeared along the lines of ethnic background, political affiliation, organisational origin and different services. Its unity and operational efficiency was further weakened by the interference of civilians and politicians in military affairs, and the perception gap between the staff officers and field commanders.

In accordance with the agreement reached at Kandy Conference in September 1945, the Tatmadaw was reorganised by incorporating the British Burma Army and the Patriotic Burmese Forces. The officer corps shared by ex-PBF officers and officers from British Burma Army and Army of Burma Reserve Organisation (ARBO). The colonial government also decided to form what were known as "Class Battalions" based on ethnicity. There were a total of 15 rifle battalions at the time of independence and four of them were made up of former members of PBF. All influential positions within the War Office and commands were manned with non-former PBF Officers.

Composition of the Tatmadaw in 1948
Battalion	Composition
No. 1 Burma Rifles	Bamar (Burma Military Police)
No. 2 Burma Rifles	Karen majority + other Non-Bamar Nationalities (commanded by then Lieutenant Colonel Saw Chit Khin [Karen officer from British Burma Army])
No. 3 Burma Rifles	Bamar / former members of Patriotic Burmese Forces
No. 4 Burma Rifles	Bamar / former members of Patriotic Burmese Force – Commanded by then Lieutenant Colonel Ne Win
No. 5 Burma Rifles	Bamar / former members of Patriotic Burmese Force
No. 6 Burma Rifles	Bamar / former members of Patriotic Burmese Force
No. 1 Karen Rifles	Karen / former members of British Burma Army and ABRO
No. 2 Karen Rifles	Karen / former members of British Burma Army and ABRO
No. 3 Karen Rifles	Karen / former members of British Burma Army and ABRO
No. 1 Kachin Rifles	Kachin / former members of British Burma Army and ABRO
No. 2 Kachin Rifles	Kachin / former members of British Burma Army and ABRO
No. 1 Chin Rifles	Chin / former members of British Burma Army and ABRO
No. 2 Chin Rifles	Chin / former members of British Burma Army and ABRO
No. 4 Burma Regiment	Gurkha
Chin Hill Battalion	Chin

== Formation and structure ==
The army has always been by far the largest service in Myanmar and has always received the lion's share of the defence budget. It has played the most prominent part in Myanmar's struggle against the 40 or more insurgent groups since 1948 and acquired a reputation as a tough and resourceful military force. In 1981, it was described as 'probably the best army in Southeast Asia, apart from Vietnam's'. The judgement was echoed in 1983, when another observer noted that "Myanmar's infantry is generally rated as one of the toughest, most combat seasoned in Southeast Asia". In 1985, a foreign journalist with the rare experience of seeing Burmese soldiers in action against ethnic insurgents and narco-armies was "thoroughly impressed by their fighting skills, endurance and discipline". Other observers during that period characterised the Myanmar Army as "the toughest, most effective light infantry jungle force now operating in Southeast Asia". Even the Thai people, not known to praise the Burmese lightly, have described the Myanmar Army as "skilled in the art of jungle warfare".

=== Organisation ===
The Myanmar Army had reached some 370,000 active troops of all ranks in 2000. There were 337 infantry battalions, including 266 light infantry battalions as of 2000. Although the Myanmar Army's organisational structure was based upon the regimental system, the basic manoeuvre and fighting unit is the battalion, known as Tat Yinn (တပ်ရင်း) in Burmese. This is composed of a headquarters company and four rifle companies Tat Khwe (တပ်ခွဲ) with three rifle platoons Tat Su (တပ်စု) each; headquarters company has medical, transport, logistics, and signals units; a heavy weapons company including mortar, machine gun, and recoilless gun platoons. Each battalion is commanded by a lieutenant colonel Du Ti Ya Bo Hmu Gyi or Du Bo Hmu Gyi with a major (Bo Hmu) as second in command. In 1966 structure, ကဖ/၇၀(၈)/၆၆, a battalion has an authorised strength of 27 Officers and 750 Other Ranks, totaling at 777. Light infantry battalions in the Myanmar Army have much lower establishment strength of around 500; this often leads to these units being mistakenly identified by observers as under-strength infantry battalions. Both Infantry Battalions and Light Infantry Battalions were reorganised as 857 men units, 31 Officers and 826 Other Ranks, in 2001 under structure of ကဖ/၇၀-ဆ/၂၀၀၁. However, currently, most battalions are badly undermanned and have less than 150 men in general.

With its significantly increased personnel numbers, weaponry, and mobility, today's Tatmadaw Kyi (တပ်မတော်(ကြည်း)) is a formidable conventional defence force for the Union of Myanmar. Troops ready for combat duty have at least doubled since 1988. Logistics infrastructure and artillery fire support have been greatly increased. Its newly acquired military might was apparent in the Tatmadaw's dry season operations against Karen National Union (KNU) strongholds in Manerplaw and Kawmoora. Most of the casualties at these battles were the result of intense and heavy bombardment by the Myanmar Army. The Myanmar Army is now much larger than it was before 1988, it is more mobile and has greatly improved armour, artillery, and air defence inventories. Its C3I (Command, Control, Communications, Computers and Intelligence) systems have been expanded and refined. It is developing larger and more integrated, self-sustained formations to improve coordinated action by different combat arms. The army may still have relatively modest weaponry compared to its larger neighbours, but it is now in a much better position to deter external aggression and respond to such a threat should it ever arise, although child soldiers may not perform very well in combating with enemies.

=== Expansion ===
The first army division to be formed after the 1988 military coup was the No. (11) Light Infantry Division (LID) in December 1988 with Colonel Win Myint as commander. In March 1990, a new regional military command was created in Monywa with Brigadier Kyaw Min as commander and named the North-Western Regional Military Command. A year later, 101st LID was formed in Pakokku with Colonel Saw Tun as commander. Two Regional Operations Commands (ROC) were formed in Myeik and Loikaw to improve command and control. They were commanded respectively by Brigadier Soe Tint and Brigadier Maung Kyi. March 1995 saw a dramatic expansion of the Tatmadaw as it established 11 Military Operations Commands (MOC)s in that month. MOC are similar to mechanised infantry divisions in Western armies, each with 10 regular infantry battalions (Chay Hlyin Tatyin), a headquarters, and organic support units including field artillery. In 1996, two new RMC were opened, Coastal Region RMC was opened in Myeik with Brigadier Sit Maung as commander and Triangle Region RMC in Kengtung with Brigadier Thein Sein as commander. Three new ROCs were created in Kalay, Bhamo and Mongsat. In late 1998, two new MOCs were created in Bokepyin and Mongsat.

The most significant expansion after the infantry in the army was in armour and artillery. Beginning in 1990, the Tatmadaw procured 18 T-69II main battle tanks and 48 T-63 amphibious light tanks from China. Further procurements were made, including several hundred Type 85 and Type 92 armoured personnel carriers (APC). By the beginning of 1998, the Tatmadaw had about 100 T-69II main battle tanks, a similar number of T-63 amphibious light tanks, and several T-59D tanks. These tanks and armoured personnel carriers were distributed throughout five armoured infantry battalions and five tank battalions and formed the first armoured division of the Tatmadaw as the 71st Armoured Operations Command with its headquarters in Pyawbwe.

=== Bureau of Special Operations (BSO) ===
Bureau of Special Operations

The Bureau of Special Operations (ကာကွယ်ရေးဌာန စစ်ဆင်ရေး အထူးအဖွဲ့) in the Myanmar Army are high-level field units equivalent to field armies in Western terms and consist of two or more regional military commands (RMC) commanded by a lieutenant general and six staff officers.

The units were introduced under the General Staff Office on 28 April 1978 and 1 June 1979. In early 1978, the Chairman of BSPP, General Ne Win, visited the Northeastern Command Headquarters in Lashio to receive a briefing about Burmese Communist Party (BCP) insurgents and their military operations. He was accompanied by Brigadier General Tun Ye from the Ministry of Defence. Brigadier General Tun Ye was the regional commander of the Eastern Command for three years and before that he served in Northeastern Command areas as commander of Strategic Operation Command (SOC) and commander of Light Infantry Divisions for four years. As BCP military operations were spread across three Regional Military Command (RMC) areas (Northern, Eastern, and Northeastern), Brigadier General Tun Ye was the most informed commander about the BCP in the Myanmar Army at the time. At the briefing, General Ne Win was impressed by Brigadier General Tun Ye and realised that co-ordination among various Regional Military Commands (RMC) was necessary; thus, decided to form a bureau at the Ministry of Defence.

Originally, the bureau was for "special operations", wherever they were, that needed co-ordination among various Regional Military Commands (RMC). Later, with the introduction of another bureau, there was a division of command areas. The BSO-1 was to oversee the operations under the Northern Command, Northeastern Command, the Eastern Command, and the Northwestern Command. BSO-2 was to oversee operations under the Southeastern Command, Southwestern Command, Western Command and Central Command.

Initially, the chief of the BSO had the rank of brigadier general. The rank was upgraded to major general on 23 April 1979. In 1990, it was further upgraded to lieutenant general. Between 1995 and 2002, Chief of Staff (Army) jointly held the position of Chief of BSO. However, in early 2002, two more BSO were added to the General Staff Office; therefore there were altogether four BSOs. The fifth BSO was established in 2005 and the sixth in 2007.

Currently there are six Bureaus of Special Operations in the Myanmar order of battle.

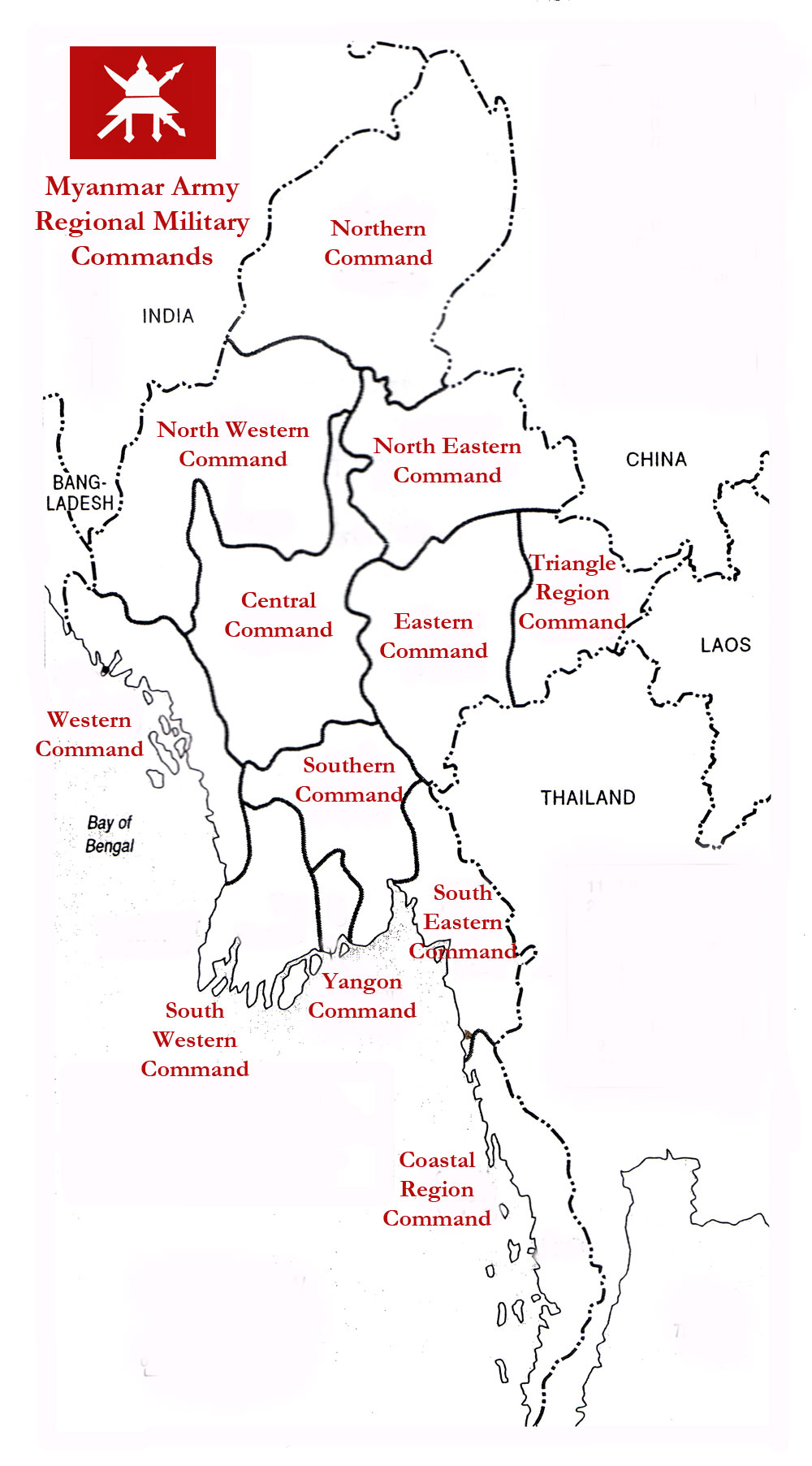
Regional Military Commands in 2010

Bureau of Special Operations (BSO)	Regional Military Commands (RMC)	Chief of Bureau of Special Operations	Notes
Bureau of Special Operations 1	Central Command; Northwestern Command; Northern Command	Lt. Gen. Ko Ko Oo	
Bureau of Special Operations 2	Northeastern Command; Eastern Command; Triangle Region Command; Eastern Central Command	Lt. Gen. Naing Naing Oo	
Bureau of Special Operations 3	Southwestern Command; Southern Command; Western Command	Lt. Gen. Phone Myat	
Bureau of Special Operations 4	Coastal Command; Southeastern Command	Lt. Gen. Nyunt Win Swe	
Bureau of Special Operations 5	Yangon Command	Lt. Gen. Thet Pon	
Bureau of Special Operations 6	Naypyidaw Command	Lt. Gen. Tay Za Kyaw	

=== Regional Military Commands (RMC) ===
For a better command and communication, the Tatmadaw formed a Regional Military Commands (တိုင်း စစ်ဌာနချုပ်) structure in 1958. Until 1961, there were only two regional commands, they were supported by 13 infantry brigades and an infantry division. In October 1961, new regional military commands were opened and leaving only two independent infantry brigades.

A total of 517 infantry and light infantry battalions are commanded by the Regional Military Commands, and organised under the direct control of RMCs, into Military Operation Commands, Light Infantry Divisions and Tactical Operations Commands. Additionally, nationwide there are 100 Artillery Battalions, 24 Armoured/tank Battalions and 9 Missile Battalions.

RMCs are similar to corps formations in Western armies. The RMCs, commanded by major general, are managed through a framework of Bureau of Special Operations (BSOs), which are equivalent to field army group in Western terms..

Regional Military Command (RMC)	Badge	States & Regions	Headquarters	Strength	Notes
Northern Command (မြောက်ပိုင်းတိုင်းစစ်ဌာနချုပ်)		Kachin State	Myitkyina	46 Infantry Battalions plus an additional 3 Battalions as Border Guard Force units	
Northeastern Command (အရှေ့မြောက်ပိုင်းတိုင်းစစ်ဌာနချုပ်)		Northern Shan State	Lashio	45 Infantry Battalions	Captured by the Myanmar National Democratic Alliance Army on 3 August 2024. With ceasefire deal brokered by China, MNDAA forces retreated and Tatmadaw forces re-entered into city in 17 April.
Eastern Command (အရှေ့ပိုင်းတိုင်းစစ်ဌာနချုပ်)		Southern Shan State and Kayah State	Taunggyi	35 Infantry Battalions plus an additional 2 Battalions as Border Guard Force units	
Southeastern Command (အရှေ့တောင်တိုင်းစစ်ဌာနချုပ်)		Mon State and Kayin State	Mawlamyine	56 Infantry Battalions plus an additional 13 Battalions as Border Guard Force units	
Southern Command (တောင်ပိုင်းတိုင်းစစ်ဌာနချုပ်)		Bago and Magwe Regions	Toungoo	32 Infantry Battalions	
Western Command (အနောက်ပိုင်းတိုင်းစစ်ဌာနချုပ်)		Rakhine State and Chin State	Ann	43 Infantry Battalions	Captured by the Arakan Army on 20 December 2024. 33 Battalions have been captured by the National Resistance by the end of 2024
Southwestern Command (အနောက်တောင်တိုင်းစစ်ဌာနချုပ်)		Ayeyarwady Region	Pathein	11 Infantry Battalions	
Northwestern Command (အနောက်မြောက်တိုင်းစစ်ဌာနချုပ်)		Sagaing Region	Monywa	49 Infantry Battalions	
Yangon Command (ရန်ကုန်တိုင်းစစ်ဌာနချုပ်)		Yangon Region	Mayangone Township-Kone-Myint-Thar	41 Infantry Battalions	
Coastal Region Command (ကမ်းရိုးတန်းတိုင်းစစ်ဌာနချုပ်)		Tanintharyi Region	Myeik	45 Infantry Battalions	
Triangle Region Command (တြိဂံတိုင်းစစ်ဌာနချုပ်)		Eastern Shan State	Kyaingtong (Kengtung)	40 Infantry Battalions plus an additional 4 Battalions as Border Guard Force units	
Central Command (အလယ်ပိုင်းတိုင်းစစ်ဌာနချုပ်)		Mandalay Region	Mandalay	25 Infantry Battalions	
Naypyidaw Command (နေပြည်တော်တိုင်းစစ်ဌာနချုပ်)		Naypyidaw	Pyinmana	Formed in 2006 – 18 Infantry Battalions	
Eastern Central Command (အရှေ့အလယ်ပိုင်းတိုင်းစစ်ဌာနချုပ်)		Middle Shan State	Kholam	Formed in 2011 – 31 Infantry Battalions	

==== Commanders of Regional Military Commands ====
Regional Military Command (RMC)	Established	First Commander	Current Commander	Notes
Eastern Command	1961	Brigadier General San Yu	Major General Zaw Min Latt	Initially in 1961, San Yu was appointed as Commander of Eastern Command but was moved to NW Command and replaced with Col. Maung Shwe then.
Southeastern Command	1961	Brigadier General Sein Win	Brigadier General Soe Min	In 1961 when SE Command was formed, Sein Win was transferred from former Southern Command but was moved to Central Command and replaced with Thaung Kyi then.
Central Command	1961	Colonel Thaung Kyi	Major General Kyi Khaing	Original NW Command based at Mandalay was renamed Central Command in March 1990 and original Central Command was renamed Southern Command
Northwestern Command	1961	Brigadier General Kyaw Min	Major General Than Htike	Southern part of original Northwestern Command in Mandalay was renamed Central Command in March 1990 and northern part of original NW Command was renamed NW Command in 1990.
Southwestern Command	1961	Colonel Kyi Maung	Brigadier General Wai Linn	Kyi Maung was sacked in 1963 and was imprisoned a few times. He became Deputy Chairman of NLD in the 1990s.
Yangon Command	1969	Colonel Thura Kyaw Htin	Major General Zaw Hein	Formed as Naypyidaw Command in 1963 with deputy commander and some staff officers from Central Command. Reformed and renamed Yangon Command on 1 June 1969.
Western Command	1969	Colonel Hla Tun	Brigadier General Kyaw Swar Oo	
Northeastern Command	1972	Colonel Aye Ko	Major General Soe Tint	
Northern Command	1947	Brigadier Ne Win	Brigadier General Aung Zaw Htwe	Original Northern Command was divided into Eastern Command and NW Command in 1961. Current Northern Command was formed in 1969 as a part of reorganisation and is formed northern part of previous NW Command
Southern Command	1947	Brigadier Saw Kya Doe	Brigadier General Kyi Theik	Original Southern Command in Mandalay was renamed Central Command in March 1990
Triangle Region Command	1996	Brigadier General Thein Sein	Major General Aung Khaing Win	Thein Sein later became Prime Minister and elected as president in 2011
Coastal Region Command	1996	Brigadier General Thiha Thura Thura Sit Maung	Major General Soe Min	
Naypyidaw Command	2005	Brigadier Wei Lwin	Major General Saw Than Hlaing	
Eastern Central Command	2011	Brigadier Mya Tun Oo	Major General Myo Min Tun	

=== Regional Operations Commands (ROC) ===
Regional Operations Commands (ROC) (ဒေသကွပ်ကဲမှု စစ်ဌာနချုပ်) are commanded by a brigadier general, are similar to infantry brigades in Western Armies. Each consists of 4 Infantry battalions (Chay Hlyin Tatyin), HQ and organic support units. Commander of ROC is a position between LID/MOC commander and tactical Operation Command (TOC) commander, who commands three infantry battalions. The ROC commander holds financial, administrative and judicial authority while the MOC and LID commanders do not have judicial authority. ROC (Laukkai) was captured by MNDAA on Jan 5, 2024.

Regional Operation Command (ROC)	Headquarters	Strength	Notes
Loikaw Regional Operations Command	Loikaw (လွိုင်ကော်) Kayah State	8 Infantry Battalions	
Laukkai Regional Operations Command	Laukkai (လောက်ကိုင်), Shan State	7 Infantry Battalions	Captured by the Myanmar National Democratic Alliance Army on 5 January 2024
Kalay Regional Operations Command	Kalay (ကလေး), Sagaing Division	4 Infantry Battalions	
Sittwe Regional Operations Command	Sittwe (စစ်တွေ), Rakhine State	4 Infantry Battalions	
Pyay Regional Operations Command	Pyay (ပြည်), Bago Division	2 Infantry Battalions	
Tanai Regional Operations Command	Tanai (တနိုင်း), Kachin State	5 Infantry Battalions	Formerly ROC Bhamo
Wanhseng Regional Operations Command	Wanhseng, Shan State		Formed in 2011

=== Military Operations Commands (MOC) ===
Military Operations Commands (MOC) (စစ်ဆင်ရေးကွပ်ကဲမှုဌာနချုပ်), commanded by a brigadier-general are similar to Infantry Divisions in Western Armies. Each consists of 10 Mechanised Infantry battalions equipped with BTR-3 armoured personnel carriers, Headquarters and support units including field artillery batteries. These ten battalions are organised into three Tactical Operations Commands: one Mechanised Tactical Operations Command with BTR-3 armoured personnel carriers, and two Motorised Tactical Operations Command with EQ-2102 6x6 trucks.

MOC are equivalent to Light Infantry Divisions (LID) in the Myanmar Army order of battle as both command 10 infantry battalions through three TOC's (Tactical Operations Commands). However, unlike Light Infantry Divisions, MOC are subordinate to their respective Regional Military Command (RMC) Headquarters. Members of MOC does not wear distinguished arm insignias and instead uses their respective RMC's arm insignias. For example, MOC-20 in Kawthaung wore the arm insignia of Coastal Region Military Command. No. (15) MOC and No. (9) MOC has been captured by AA. No. (16) MOC has been captured by MNDAA.

Military Operation Command (MOC)	Headquarters	Strength	Notes
No. (1) Military Operations Command (MOC-1)	Kyaukme, Shan State	11 Infantry Battalions	Captured by Ta'ang National Liberation Army on 5 August 2024.
No. (2) Military Operations Command (MOC-2)	Mong Nawng, Shan State	11 Infantry Battalions	
No. (3) Military Operations Command (MOC-3)	Mogaung, Kachin State	10 Infantry Battalions	Renamed as No. (3) Infantry Brigade
No. (4) Military Operations Command (MOC-4)	Hpugyi, Yangon Region	10 Infantry Battalions	Designated Airborne Division. Renamed as No. (4) Infantry Brigade
No. (5) Military Operations Command (MOC-5)	Taungup, Rakhine State	10 Infantry Battalions	
No. (6) Military Operations Command (MOC-6)	Pyinmana (ပျဉ်းမနား), Mandalay Region	10 Infantry Battalions	
No. (7) Military Operations Command (MOC-7)	Pekon (ဖယ်ခုံ), Shan State	10 Infantry Battalions	
No. (8) Military Operations Command (MOC-8)	Dawei (ထားဝယ်), Tanintharyi Region	10 Infantry Battalions	
No. (9) Military Operations Command (MOC-9)	Kyauktaw (ကျောက်တော်), Rakhine State	10 Infantry Battalions	Captured by Arakha Army on 10 February 2024. Commanded by Brigadier General Zaw Min Htun.
No. (10) Military Operations Command (MOC-10)	Kalay (ကျီကုန်း (ကလေးဝ)), Sagaing Region	10 Infantry Battalions	
No. (12) Military Operations Command (MOC-12)	Kawkareik (ကော့ကရိတ်), Kayin State	10 Infantry Battalions	Previously commanded by Brigadier General Aung Zaw Lin Current Commander, Colonel Myo Min Htwe
No. (13) Military Operations Command (MOC-13)	Bokpyin (ဘုတ်ပြင်း), Tanintharyi Region	10 Infantry Battalions	
No. (14) Military Operations Command (MOC-14)	Mong Hsat (မိုင်းဆတ်), Shan State	10 Infantry Battalions	
No. (15) Military Operations Command (MOC-15)	Buthidaung (ဘူးသီးတောင်), Rakhine State	10 Infantry Battalions	Captured by Arakha Army on 4 May 2024.
No. (16) Military Operations Command (MOC-16)	Theinni (သိန်းနီ), Shan State	10 Infantry Battalions	Captured by the Three Brotherhood Alliance on 7 January 2024 Previously commanded by Brigadier General Thaw Zin Oo Currently commanded by Colonel Maung Maung Lay. Unit renamed as No 16 Infantry Brigade
No. (17) Military Operations Command (MOC-17)	Mong Pan (မိုင်းပန်), Shan State	10 Infantry Battalions	
No. (18) Military Operations Command (MOC-18)	Mong Hpayak (မိုင်းပေါက်), Shan State	11 Infantry Battalions	
No. (19) Military Operations Command (MOC-19)	Ye (ရေး), Mon State	10 Infantry Battalions	
No. (20) Military Operations Command (MOC-20)	Kawthaung (ကော့သောင်း), Tanintharyi Region	10 Infantry Battalions	
No. (21) Military Operations Command (MOC-21)	Bhamo (ဗန်းမော်), Kachin State	8 Infantry Battalions	

=== Light Infantry Divisions (LID) ===
Light Infantry Division (ခြေမြန်တပ်မ or တမခ), commanded by a brigadier general, each with 10 Light Infantry Battalions organised under 3 Tactical Operations Commands, commanded by a Colonel (3 battalions each and 1 reserve), 1 Field Artillery Battalion, 1 Armour Squadron and other support units.

These divisions were first introduced to the Myanmar Army in 1966 as rapid reaction mobile forces for strike operations. No. (77) Light Infantry Division was formed on 6 June 1966, followed by No. (88) Light Infantry Division and No. (99) Light Infantry Division in the two following years. No. (77) LID was largely responsible for the defeat of the Communist forces of the CPB (Communist Party of Burma) based in the forested hills of the central Bago Mountains in the mid-1970s. Three more LIDs were raised in the latter half of the 1970s (the No. (66), No. (44) and No. (55)) with their headquarters at Pyay, Aungban and Thaton. They were followed by another two LIDs in the period prior to the 1988 military coup (the No. (33) LID with headquarters at Sagaing and the No. (22) LID with headquarters at Hpa-An). No. (11) LID was formed in December 1988 with headquarters at Inndine, Bago Division and No. (101) LID was formed in 1991 with its headquarters at Pakokku.

Each LID, commanded by Brigadier General (Bo hmu gyoke) level officers, consists of 10 light infantry battalions specially trained in counter-insurgency, jungle warfare, "search and destroy" operations against ethnic insurgents and narcotics-based armies. These battalions are organised under three Tactical Operations Commands (TOC; Nee byu har). Each TOC, commanded by a Colonel (Bo hmu gyi), is made up of three or more combat battalions, with command and support elements similar to that of brigades in Western armies. One infantry battalion is held in reserve. As of 2000, all LIDs have their own organic Field Artillery units. For example, 314th Field Artillery Battery is now attached to 44th LID. Some of the LID battalions have been given Parachute and Air Borne Operations training and two of the LIDs have been converted to mechanised infantry formation with divisional artillery, armoured reconnaissance and tank battalions

LIDs are considered to be a strategic asset of the Myanmar Army, and after the 1990 reorganisation and restructuring of the Tatmadaw command structure, they are now directly answerable to Chief of Staff (Army).

Light Infantry Division (LID)	Badge	Year formed	Headquarters	First commander	Current commander	Notes
No. (11) Light Infantry Division	11th Light Infantry Division	1988	Inndine	Col. Win Myint	Brigadier General	Formed after 1988 military coup. Previous Commander, Brigadier General Min Min Htun (not to be confused with 101) was killed in action
No. (22) Light Infantry Division	22nd Light Infantry Division	1987	Hpa-An	Col. Tin Hla	Brigadier General Toe Win	Involved in crackdown of unarmed protestors during 8.8.88 democracy uprising
No. (33) Light Infantry Division	33rd Light Infantry Division	1984	Mandalay/later Sagaing	Col. Kyaw Ba	Colonel Kyaw Set Myint	Involved in crackdown against the Rohingya in northern Rakhine state Involved in the Kachin conflict
No. (44) Light Infantry Division	44th Light Infantry Division	1979	Thaton	Col. Myat Thin	Colonel Soe Min Htet	Previous Commander, Brigadier General Aye Min Naung was killed after helicopter got shot down in 2023.
No. (55) Light Infantry Division	55th Light Infantry Division	1980	Sagaing/later Kalaw	Col. Phone Myint	Colonel Aung Soe Min	Surrendered to the Myanmar National Democratic Alliance Army on 26 December 2023, which included the Division Commander Brigadier General Zaw Myo Win
No. (66) Light Infantry Division	66th Light Infantry Division	1976	Innma	Col. Taung Zar Khaing	Colonel Kyaw Soe Lin	
No. (77) Light Infantry Division	77th Light Infantry Division	1966	Hmawbi/later Bago	Col. Tint Swe	Brigadier General Kyaw Kyaw Han	Surrendered to the PDF Forces on 10 April 2025 while they were trapped in an old military base left from WW2 in Inn Taw Township.
No. (88) Light Infantry Division	88th Light Infantry Division	1967	Magway	Col. Than Tin	Brigadier General Aung Hein Win	Units of 88th LID were deployed in Yangon and other regions to crackdown on protesters in 2021
No. (99) Light Infantry Division	99th Light Infantry Division	1968	Meiktila	Col. Kyaw Htin	Colonel Aung Kyaw Lwin	Involved in crackdown against the Rohingya in northern Rakhine state
No. (101) Light Infantry Division	101st Light Infantry Division	1991	Pakokku	Col. Saw Tun	Colonel Myint Swe	Units of 101st LID were deployed during the purge of Military Intelligence faction in 2004. Division Commander Brigadier General Min Min Htun was captured by TNLA

No. (11) Light Infantry Division: The Division GOC Brigadier General Min Min Htun was killed on Feb 7, 2024, during skirmishes at Mrauk U. All 10 battalions/regiments under its command suffered heavy casualties and are no longer combat effective. The division has neither been reinforced nor rebuilt. It has withdrawn from action.

No. (22) Light Infantry Division: The division, similar to No. (11), suffered heavy casualties in 2022. It withdrew from combat later and mostly operates as reserve. It is currently within Operation Aung Zeya.

=== Tactical Operation Commands ===
Additionally, nationwide there are around 23 permanent Tactical Operation Commands, which generally command a between two and four infantry battalions and a small number of support units which are all contiguous. Additional temporary Tactical Operation Commands may be headquartered at major fortified outposts to command specific battles.

The permanent Tactical Operation Commands are:

Name	Location	Command	Notes
Mongmit Tactical Operations Command	Mongmit, North Shan State	Northern RMC	Captured by the Kachin Independence Army on 31 July 2024
Puta-O Tactical Operations Command	Puta-O, Kachin State	Northern RMC	
Hakha Tactical Operations Command	Hakha, Chin State	North-Western RMC	
Matupi Tactical Operations Command	Matupi, Chin State	North-Western RMC	Captured by the Chin Brotherhood Alliance on 29 June 2024
Hkamti Tactical Operations Command	Hkamti, Sagaing Region	North-Western RMC	
Kutkai Tactical Operations Command	Kutkai, North Shan State	North-Eastern RMC	Captured by the Ta'ang National Liberation Army on 07 Jan 2024
Kunlong Tactical Operations Command	Kunlong, North Shan State	North-Eastern RMC	Captured by the Myanmar National Democratic Alliance Army on 12 November 2023
Tangyan Tactical Operations Command	Tangyan, North Shan State	North-Eastern RMC	
Bawlakhe Tactical Operations Command	Bawlakhe, Kayah State	Eastern RMC	
Mongkhet Tactical Operations Command	Mongkhet, South Shan State	Triangle Region RMC	
Mongton Tactical Operations Command	Mongton, South Shan State	Triangle Region RMC	
Tachileik Tactical Operations Command	Tachileik, South Shan State	Triangle Region RMC	
Kunhing Tactical Operations Command	Kunhing, Shan State	Central-Eastern RMC	
Langkho Tactical Operations Command	Langkho, Shan State	Central-Eastern RMC	
Buthidaung Tactical Operations Command	Buthidaung, Rakhine	Western RMC	Captured by the Arakan Army on 18 May 2024
Mawyawaddy Tactical Operations Command	Maungdaw, Rakhine	Western RMC	Captured by the Arakan Army on 13 June 2024
Shwegyin Tactical Operations Command	Shwegyin, Bago	Southern RMC	
H'papun Tactical Operations Command	H'papun, Kayin	South-Eastern RMC	
Hlaingbwe Tactical Operations Command	Hlaingbwe, Kayin	South-Eastern RMC	
Kyainseikgyi Tactical Operations Command	Kyainseikgyi, Kayin	South-Eastern RMC	
Thin Gan Nyi Naung Tactical Operations Command	Myawaddy, Kayin	South-Eastern RMC	Captured by the Karen National Liberation Army on 30 March 2024
Kawthoung Tactical Operations Command	Kawthoung, Tanintharyi	Coastal Region RMC	
No. 3 Tactical Operations Command	Yangon	Yagon RMC	

=== Missile, Artillery and armoured units ===
Missile, artillery and armoured units were not used in an independent role, but were deployed in support of the infantry by the Ministry of Defence as required. The Directorate of Artillery and Armour Corps was also divided into separate corps in 2001. The Directorate of Artillery and Missile Corps was also divided into separate corps in 2009. A dramatic expansion of forces under these directorates followed with the equipment procured from China, Russia, Ukraine and India.

=== Directorate of Missiles (Myanmar Missile Artillery) ===
==== No(1) Missile Operational Command MOC(1) ====
- HQ battalion
- 10 Missile Battalions

=== Directorate of Artillery (Myanmar Artillery) ===
Artillery Operation Command

No. 1 Artillery Battalion was formed in 1952 with three artillery batteries under the Directorate of Artillery Corps. A further three artillery battalions were formed in the late 1952. This formation remained unchanged until 1988. Since 2000, the Directorate of Artillery Corps has overseen the expansion of Artillery Operations Commands(AOC) from two to 10. Tatmadaw's stated intention is to establish an organic Artillery Operations Command in each of the 12 Regional Military Command Headquarters. Each Artillery Operation Command is composed of the following:

As of 2000, the Artillery wing of the Tatmadaw has about 60 battalions and 37 independent Artillery companies/batteries attached to various Regional Military Commands (RMC), Light Infantry Divisions (LID), Military Operation Command (MOC) and Regional Operation Command (ROC). For example, No. (314) Artillery Battery is under No. (44) LID, No. (326) Artillery Battery is attached to No. (5) MOC, No. (074) Artillery Battery is under the command of ROC (Bhamo) and No. (076) Artillery Battery is under North-Eastern RMC. Twenty of these Artillery battalions are grouped under No. (707) Artillery Operation Command (AOC) headquarters in Kyaukpadaung and No. (808) Artillery Operation Command (AOC) headquarters in Oaktwin, near Taungoo. The remaining 30 battalions, including 7 Anti-Aircraft artillery battalions are under the Directorate of Artillery Corps.

==== Artillery Operations Command (AOC) ====
- HQ battalion
- 12 Artillery battalions:
  - 6 Light Field artillery battalion equipped with 105 mm, 76 mm, 75 mm howitzers, field guns and mountain guns,
  - 3 Medium Field Artillery battalion equipped with 155 mm, 130 mm, 122 mm howitzers and field guns,
  - 1 Multiple Rocket Launcher battalion equipped with 122 mm and 240 mm MLRS, self-propelled and towed launchers,
  - 1 Air Defence Artillery battalion with 37 mm, 57 mm Anti-Aircraft guns or SA 18 IGLAs) man portable surface-to-air missiles and
  - 1 target acquisition battalion.
- support units

Light field artillery battalions consists of 3 field artillery batteries with 36 field guns or howitzers (12 guns per battery). Medium artillery battalions consists of 3 medium artillery batteries of 18 field guns or howitzers (6 guns per one battery). As of 2011, all field guns of Myanmar Artillery Corps are undergoing upgrade programs including GPS Fire Control Systems.

Artillery Operations Command (AOC)	Headquarters	Notes
No. (505) Artillery Operations Command	Myeik (မြိတ်)	
No. (707) Artillery Operations Command	Kyaukpadaung (ကျောက်ပန်းတောင်း)	
No. (606) Artillery Operations Command	Thaton (သထုံ)	
No. (808) Artillery Operations Command	Oktwin (အုပ်တွင်းမြို့)	
No. (909) Artillery Operations Command	Mong Khon--Kengtung	
No. (901) Artillery Operations Command	Baw Net Gyi (ဘောနက်ကြီး--ပဲခူးတိုင်း)	
No. (902) Artillery Operations Command	Nawnghkio	
No. (903) Artillery Operations Command	Aungban	
No. (904) Artillery Operations Command	Mohnyin (မိုးညှင်း)	
No. (905) Artillery Operations Command	Padein--Ngape	

=== Directorate of Armour (Myanmar Armored Corps) ===
No. 1 Armour Company and No. 2 Armour Company were formed in July 1950 under the Directorate of Armour and Artillery Corps with Sherman tanks, Stuart light tanks, Humber scout cars, Ferret armoured cars and Universal carriers. These two companies were merged on 1 November 1950 to become No. 1 Armour Battalion with headquarters in Mingalardon. On 15 May 1952 No. Tank Battalion was formed with 25 Comet tanks acquired from the United Kingdom. The Armour Corps within Myanmar Army was the most neglected one for nearly thirty years since the Tatmadaw had not procured any new tanks or armoured carriers since 1961.

Armoured divisions, known as Armoured Operations Command (AROC), under the command of Directorate of Armour Corps, were also expanded in number from one to two, each with four Armoured Combat battalions equipped with Infantry fighting vehicles and armoured personnel carriers, three tank battalions equipped with main battle tanks and three Tank battalions equipped with light tanks. In mid-2003, Tamadaw acquired 139+ T-72 main battle tanks from Ukraine and signed a contract to build and equip a factory in Myanmar to produce and assemble 1,000 BTR armoured personnel carriers in 2004. In 2006, the Government of India transferred an unspecified number of T-55 main battle tanks that were being phased out from active service to Tatmadaw along with 105 mm light field guns, armoured personnel carriers and indigenous HAL Light Combat Helicopters in return for Tatmadaw's support and co-operation in flushing out Indian insurgent groups operating from its soil.

==== Armoured Operations Command (AROC) ====
Armoured Operations Commands (AROC) are equivalent to Independent armoured divisions in western terms. Currently there are 5 Armoured Operations Commands under Directorate of Armoured Corps in the Tatmadaw order of battle. Tatmadaw planned to establish an AROC each in 7 Regional Military Commands. Typical armoured divisions in the Myanmar Army are composed of Headquarters, Three Armored Tactical Operations Command – each with one mechanised infantry battalion equipped with 44 BMP-1 or MAV-1 Infantry Fighting Vehicles, Two Tank Battalions equipped with 44 main battle tanks each, one armoured reconnaissance battalion equipped with 32 Type-63A Amphibious Light Tanks, one field artillery battalion and a support battalion. The support battalion is composed of an engineer squadron, two logistic squadrons, and a signal company.

The Myanmar Army acquired about 150 refurbished EE-9 Cascavel armoured cars from an Israeli firm in 2005. Classified in the army's service as a light tank, the Cascavel is currently deployed in the eastern Shan State and triangle regions near the Thai border.

Armoured Operations Command (ArOC)	Headquarters	Notes
No. (71) Armoured Operations Command	Pyawbwe (ပျော်ဘွယ်)	
No. (72) Armoured Operations Command	Ohntaw (အုန်းတော)	
No. (73) Armoured Operations Command	Malun (မလွန်)	
No. (74) Armoured Operation Command	Intaing (အင်းတိုင်)	
No. (75) Armoured Operations Command	Thagara (သာဂရ)	

=== Office of the Chief of Air Defence (Myanmar Air Defence Artillery) ===
The Office of the chief of Air Defence (လေကြောင်းရန်ကာကွယ်ရေးတပ်ဖွဲ့အရာရှိချုပ်ရုံး) is one of the major branches of Tatmadaw. It was established as the Air Defence Command in 1997, but was not fully operational until late 1999. It was renamed the Bureau of Air Defence in the early 2000s. In early 2000, Tatmadaw established the Myanmar Integrated Air Defence System (MIADS) (မြန်မာ့အလွှာစုံပေါင်းစပ်လေကြောင်းရန်ကာကွယ်ရေးစနစ်) with help from Russia and China. It is a tri-service bureau with units from all three branches of the armed forces. All air defence assets except the Army's anti-aircraft artillery battalions are integrated into the MIADS.

=== Directorate of Signals (Myanmar Signal Corps) ===
Soon after the independence in 1948, Myanmar Signal Corps was formed with units from Burma Signals, also known as "X" Branch. It consisted HQ Burma Signals, Burma Signal Training Squadron (BSTS) and Burma Signals Squadron. HQ Burma Signals was located within War Office. BSTS based in Pyin Oo Lwin was formed with Operating Cipher Training Troop, Dispatch Rider Training Troop, Lineman Training Troop, Radio Mechanic Training Troop and Regimental Signals Training Troop. BSS, based in Mingalardon, had nine sections: Administration Troop, Maintenance Troop, Operating Troop, Cipher Troop, Lineman and Dispatch Rider Troop, NBSD Signals Troop, SBSD Signals Troop, Mobile Brigade Signals Toop and Arakan Signals Toop. The then Chief of Signal Staff Officer (CSO) was Lieutenant Colonel Saw Aung Din. BSTS and BSS were later renamed No. 1 Signal Battalion and No.1 Signal Training Battalion. In 1952, the Infantry Divisional Signals Regiment was formed and later renamed to No. 2 Signal Battalion. HQ Burma Signals was reorganised and became Directorate Signal and the director was elevated to the rank of Colonel. In 1956, No. 1 Signal Security Battalion was formed, followed by No. 3 Signal Battalion in November 1958 and No.4 Signal Battalion in October 1959.

In 1961, signal battalions were reorganised as No. 11 Signal Battalion under Northeastern Regional Military Command, No. 121 Signal Battalion under Eastern Command, No. 313 Signal Battalion under Central Command, No.414 Signal Battalion under Southwestern Command, and No. 515 Signal Battalion under Southeastern Command. No.1 Signal Training Battalion was renamed Burma Signal Training Depot (Baho-Setthweye-Tat).

By 1988, Directorate of Signals command one training depot, eight signal battalions, one signal security battalion, one signal store depot and two signal workshops. Signal Corps under Directorate of Signal further expanded during 1990 expansion and reorganisation of Myanmar Armed Forces. By 2000, a signal battalion is attached to each Regional Military Command and signal companies are now attached to Light Infantry Divisions and Military Operations Commands.

In 2000, Command, Control and Communication system of Myanmar Army has been substantially upgraded by setting up the military fibre optic communication network managed by Directorate of Signal throughout the country. Since 2002 all Myanmar Army Regional Military Command HQs used its own telecommunication system. Satellite communication links are also provided to forward-deployed infantry battalions. However, battle field communication systems are still poor. Infantry units are still using TRA 906 and PRM 4051 which were acquired from UK in the 1980s. Myanmar Army also uses the locally built TRA 906 Thura and Chinese XD-D6M radio sets. Frequency hopping handsets are fitted to all front line units.

Between 2000 and 2005, Myanmar Army bought 50 units of Brett 2050 Advanced Tech radio set from Australia through third party from Singapore. Those units are distributed to ROCs in central & upper regions to use in counterinsurgency operations.

=== Directorate of Medical Services ===
At the time of independence in 1948, the medical corps has two Base Military Hospitals, each with 300 beds, in Mingalardon and Pyin Oo Lwin, a Medical Store Depot in Yangon, a Dental Unit and six Camp Reception Stations located in Myitkyina, Sittwe, Taungoo, Pyinmana, Bago and Meikhtila. Between 1958 and 1962, the medical corps was restructured and all Camp Reception Stations were reorganised into Medical Battalions.

In 1989, Directorate of Medical Services has significantly expanded along with the infantry. In 2007, there are two 1,000-bed Defence Services General Hospitals (Mingalardon and Naypyidaw), two 700-bed hospitals in Pyin Oo Lwin and Aung Ban, two 500-bed military hospitals in Meikhtila and Yangon, one 500-bed Defence Services Orthopedic Hospital in Mingalardon, two 300-bed Defence Services Obstetric, Gynecological and Children hospitals (Mingalardon and Naypyidaw), three 300-bed Military Hospitals (Myitkyina, Ann and Kengtung), eighteen 100-bed Military Hospitals (Mongphyet, Baan, Indaing, Bahtoo, Myeik, Pyay, Loikaw, Namsam, Lashio, Kalay, Mongsat, Dawei, Kawthaung, Laukkai, Thandaung, Magway, Sittwe, and Homalin), fourteen field medical battalions, which are attached to various Regional Military Commands throughout the country. Each Field Medical Battalion consists of 3 Field Medical Companies with 3 Field Hospital Units and a specialist team each. Health & Disease Control Unit (HDCU) is responsible for prevention, control & eradication of diseases.

Units	Headquarter	RMC
Medical Corps Centre	Hmawbi	Yangon Command
No.(1) Field Medical Battalion	Mandalay	Central Command
No.(2) Field Medical Battalion	Taunggyi	Eastern Command
No.(3) Field Medical Battalion	Taungoo	Southern Command
No.(4) Field Medical Battalion	Pathein	Southwestern Command
No.(5) Field Medical Battalion	Mawlamyaing	Southeastern Command
No.(6) Field Medical Battalion	Hmawbi	Yangon Command
No.(7) Field Medical Battalion	Monywa	Northwestern Command
No.(8) Field Medical Battalion	Sittwe	Western Command
No.(9) Field Medical Battalion	Mohnyin	Northern Command
No.(10) Field Medical Battalion	Lashio	Northeastern Command
No.(11) Field Medical Battalion	Bhamo	Northern Command
No.(12) Field Medical Battalion	Kengtung	Triangle Region Command
No.(13) Field Medical Battalion	Myeik	Coastal Region Command
No.(14) Field Medical Battalion	Taikkyi	Yangon Command
Health and Disease Control Unit	Mingaladon	Yangon Command

== Training ==
=== Defence academies & colleges ===
Academies	Locations
National Defence College – NDC	Naypyidaw (နေပြည်တော်)
Defence Services Command and General Staff College – DSCGSC	Kalaw (ကလော)
Defence Services Academy – DSA	Pyin U Lwin (ပြင်ဦးလွင်)
Defence Services Technological Academy – DSTA	Pyin U Lwin (ပြင်ဦးလွင်)
Defence Services Medical Academy – DSMA	Yangon (ရန်ကုန်)
Military Institute of Nursing and Paramedical Science – MINP	Yangon (ရန်ကုန်)
Military Computer And Technological Institute – MCTI (Former Military Technological College-MTC, Pyin Oo Lwin	Hopong (ဟိုပုံး)

=== Training schools ===
Training Schools	Locations
Officer Training School (OTS)	Bahtoo Station
Basic Army Combat Training School	Bahtoo Station
1st Army Combat Forces School	Bahtoo Station
2nd Army Combat Forces School	Fort Bayinnaung
Artillery Training School	Mone Tai
Armour Training School	Maing Maw
Electronic Warfare School	Pyin U Lwin
Engineer School	Pyin U Lwin
Information Warfare School	Yangon
Air, Land and Paratroops Training School	Hmawbi
Special Forces School	Fort Ye Mon

== Ranks and insignia ==
Cap badges

Officers

NCOs & ORs

=== Commissioned officer ranks ===
The rank insignia of commissioned officers.

Rank group	General / flag officers						Senior officers			Junior officers
Myanmar Army
Myanmar Army	ဗိုလ်ချုပ်မှူးကြီး Builʻkhyupʻmhūʺkrīʺ	ဒုတိယ ဗိုလ်ချုပ်မှူးကြီး Dutiya builʻkhyupʻmhūʺkrīʺ	ဗိုလ်ချုပ်ကြီး Builʻkhyupʻkrīʺ	ဒုတိယ ဗိုလ်ချုပ်ကြီး Dutiya builʻkhyupʻkrīʺ	ဗိုလ်ချုပ် Builʻkhyupʻ	ဗိုလ်မှူးချုပ် Builʻmhūʺkhyupʻ	ဗိုလ်မှူးကြီး Builʻmhūʺkrīʺ	ဒုတိယ ဗိုလ်မှူးကြီး Dutiya builʻmhūʺkrīʺ	ဗိုလ်မှူး Builʻmhūʺ	ဗိုလ်ကြီး Builʻkrīʺ	ဗိုလ် Builʻ	ဒုတိယ ဗိုလ် Dutiyabuilʻ

=== Other ranks ===
The rank insignia of non-commissioned officers and enlisted personnel.

Rank group	Senior NCOs				Junior NCOs		Enlisted
Myanmar Army							No insignia	No insignia
Myanmar Army	အရာခံဗိုလ် ’araākhaṃ bauilaʻ	ဒုတိယအရာခံဗိုလ် dautaiya ’araākhaṃ bauilaʻ	တပ်ခွဲတပ်ကြပ်ကြီး tapaʻ khavai tapaʻ karpaʻ karīʺ	တပ်ကြပ်ကြီး tapaʻ karpaʻ karīʺ	တပ်ကြပ် tapaʻ karpaʻ	ဒုတိယတပ်ကြပ် dautaiya tapaʻ karpaʻ	တပ်သား tapaʻ saāʺ	တပ်သားသစ် tapaʻ saāʺ sacaʻ

== Order of battle ==
- 14 × Regional Military Commands (RMC) organised in 6 Bureau of Special Operations (BSO)
- 6 × Regional Operations Commands (ROC)
- 20 × Military Operations Commands (MOC) including 1 × Airborne Infantry Division
- 10 × Light Infantry Divisions (LID)
- 5 × Armoured Operation Commands (AOC) (Each with 6 Tank Battalions and 4 Armoured Infantry Battalions (IFVs/APCs).)
- 10 × Artillery Operation Commands (AOC) (with of 113 Field Artillery Battalions)
- 9 × Air Defence Operation Commands
- 1 × Missile Operation Commands
- 40+ × Military Affairs Security Companies (MAS Units replaces former Military Intelligence Units after the disbandment of the Directorate of Defence Service Intelligence (DDSI))
- 45 × Advanced Signal Battalions
- 54 × Field Engineer Battalions
- 4 × Armoured Engineer Battalions
- 14 × Medical Battalions

== Gallery ==
Myanmar Army
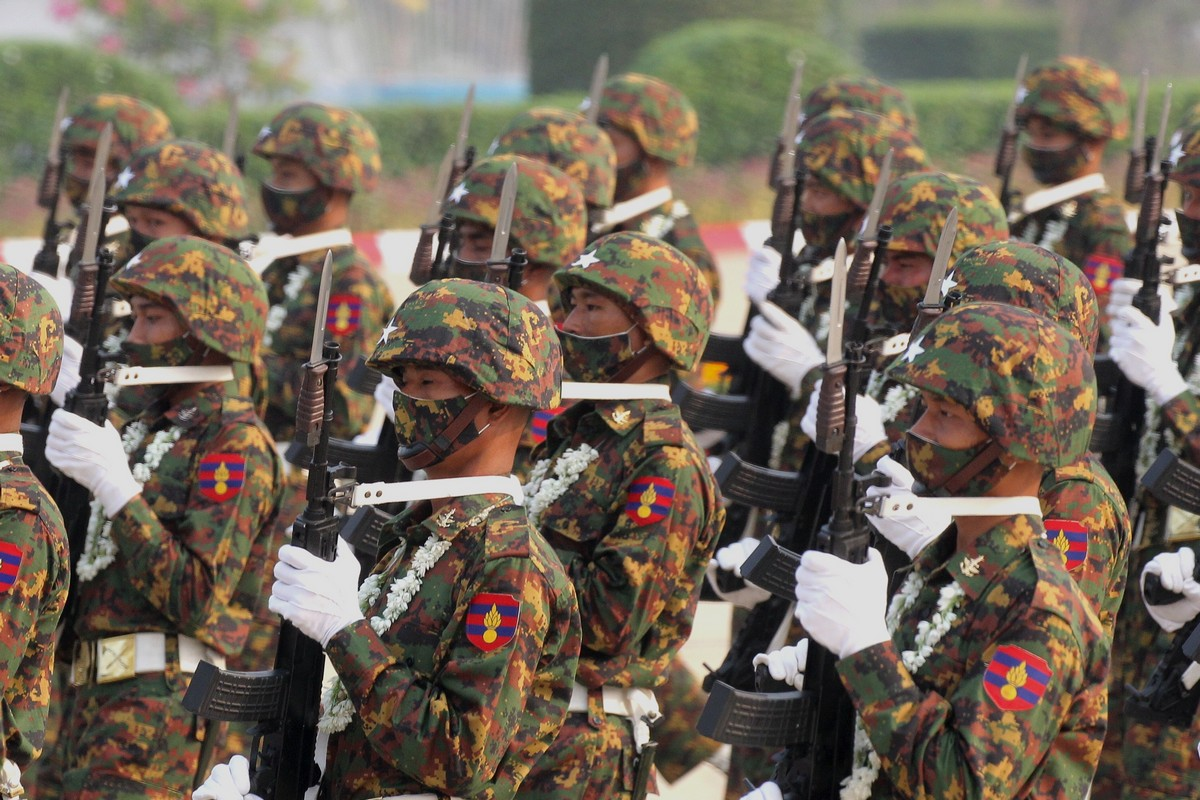
Myanmar Army soldiers during the 2021 Armed Forces Day parade

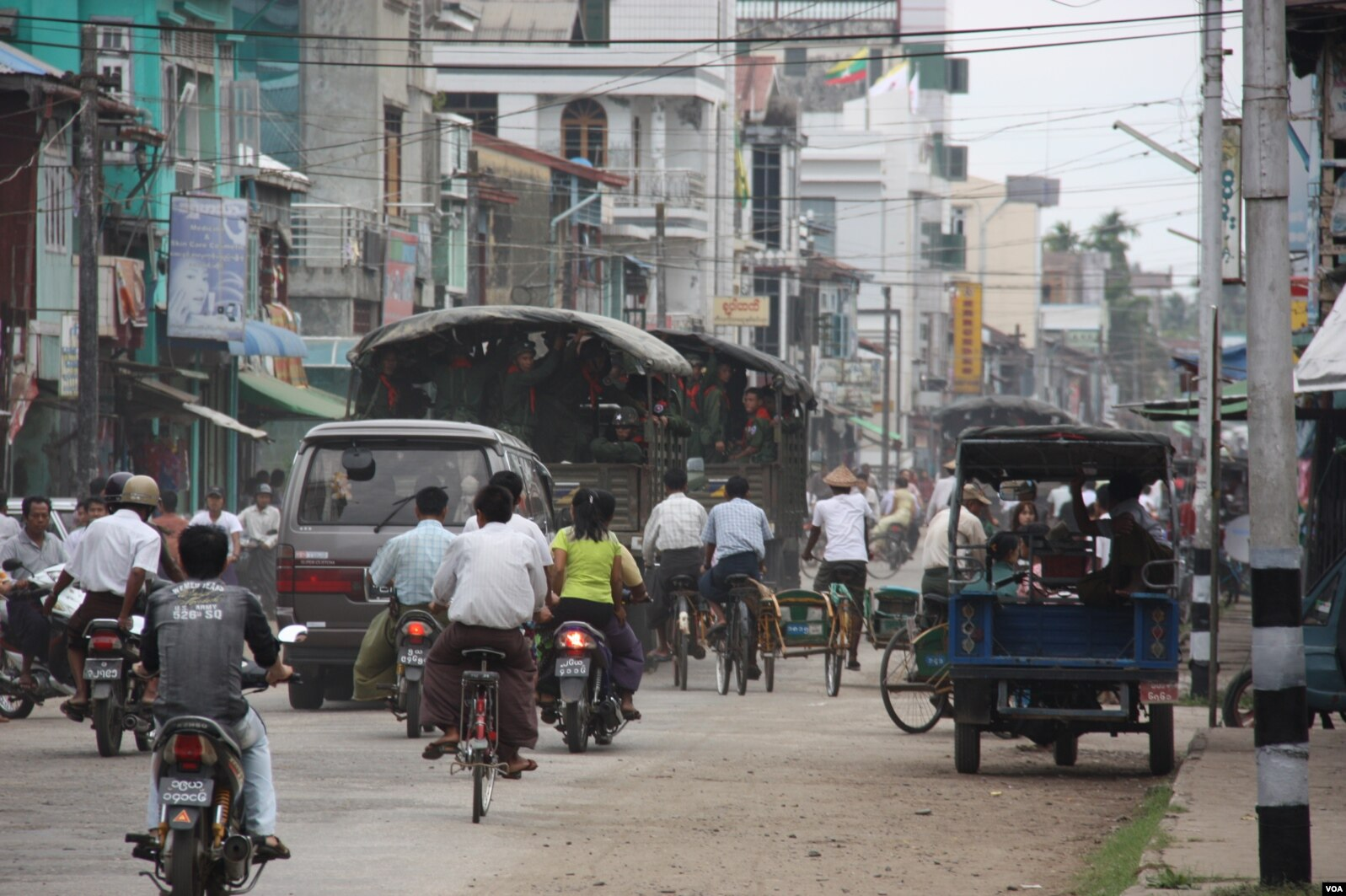
Myanmar Army soldiers in trucks in Sittwe, Rakhine State- 2012.

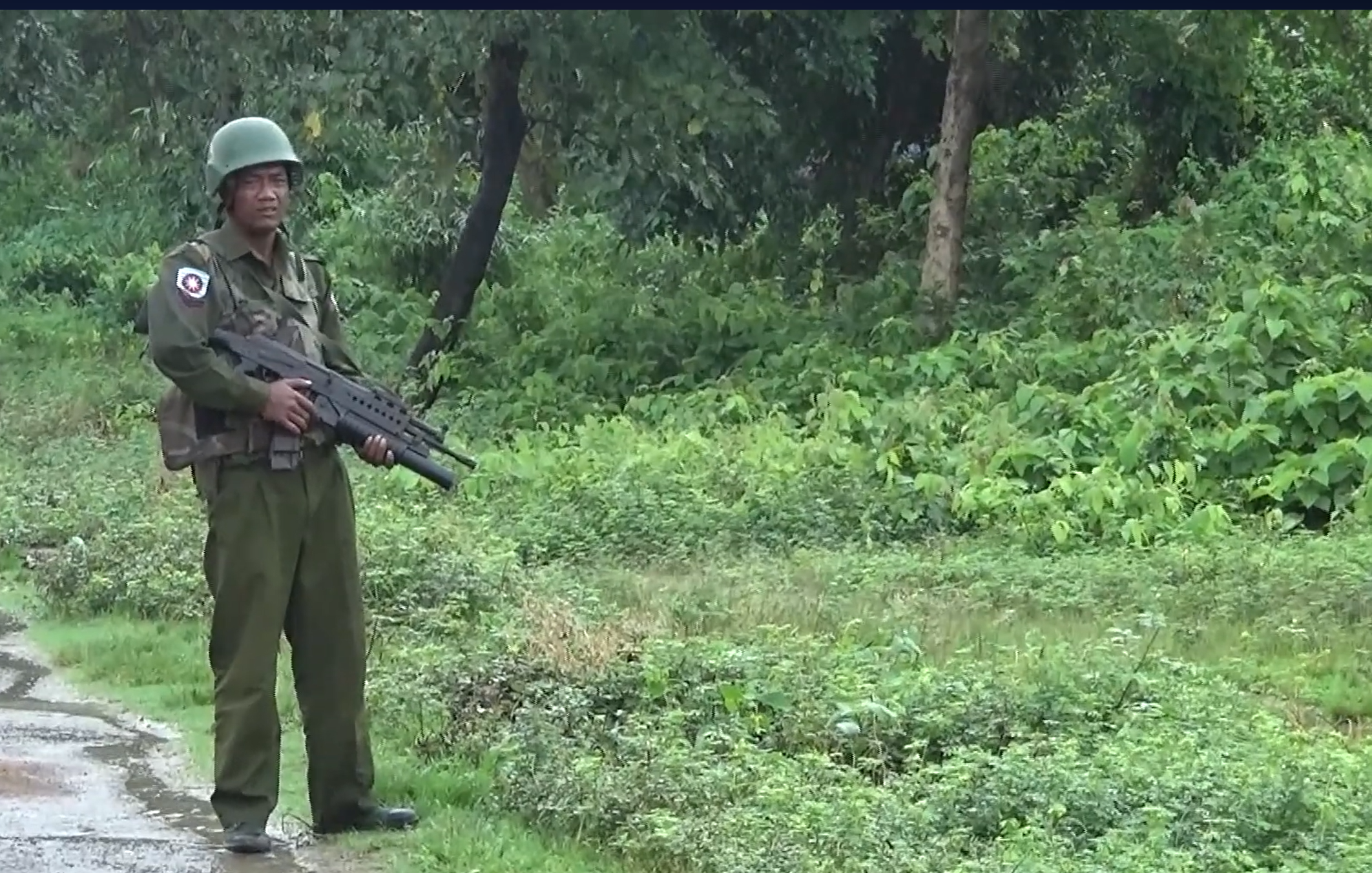
A Myanmar Army soldier of the Western Command with an olive drab uniform and woodland vest.

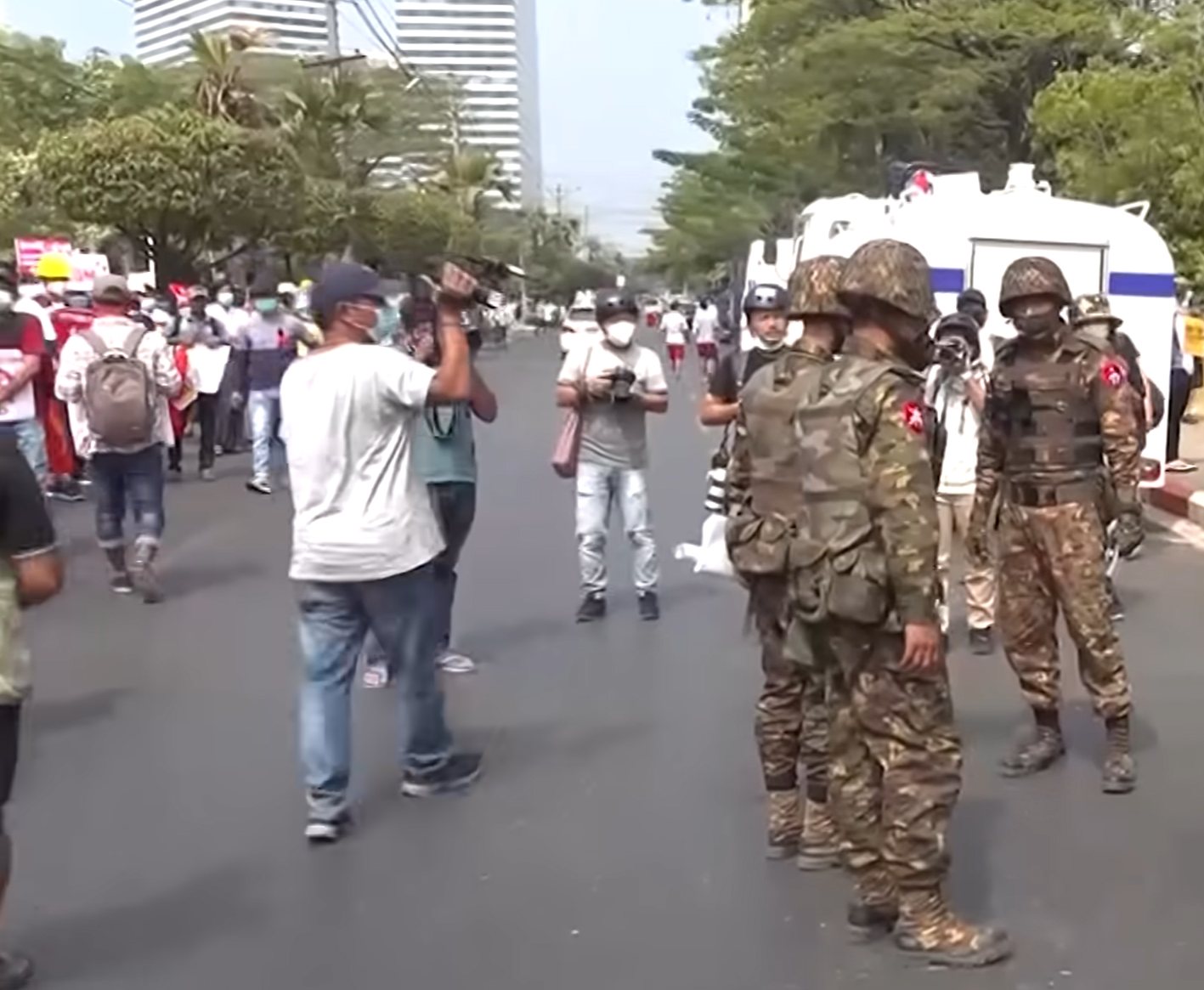
3 Myanmar Army soldiers during a February 2021 anti-coup protest in Yangon. All soldiers wear digital camo uniforms and footwear while 2 wear Woodland-pattern vests.

== See also ==
- Ne Win
- Than Shwe
- Min Aung Hlaing
- Soe Win (general)
- Khin Nyunt
- Aung San
- Maung Aye
- Saw Maung
- Zaw Min Tun (general)
- Tatmadaw
- Myanmar Navy
- Myanmar Air Force
- Military Intelligence of Myanmar
- Myanmar Police Force
