= Chinese research ship Mirage Hunter =

History

PRC
- Name: Mirage Hunter

General characteristics
- Class & type: Mirage Hunter
- Electronic warfare & decoys: None
- Armament: Unarmed
- Aircraft carried: None
- Aviation facilities: None

Mirage Hunter (Chinese: 幻影猎手, Hanyu Pinyin: Huan-Ying Lie-Shou) technical research ship (AGTR) is a very little known naval auxiliary ship currently of the People's Liberation Army Navy (PLAN). First revealed in January 2012 with standard Chinese naval camouflage, only a single unit has been built as of mid-2010s.

Externally, Mirage Hunter looks identical to Sea Shadow (IX-529), albeit on a much scaled-down size, and both ships adopt the same small-waterplane-area twin hull design. Mirage Hunter is built by a shipyard in Wuhan, where the 701st Institute of China Shipbuilding Industry Corporation (CSIC) headquartered. 701st Institute is the primary Chinese research establishment conducting research on stealth features for ships and boats, and it is therefore postulated that Mirage Hunter AGTR is used by Chinese to research on the hull form of naval stealth technology and countermeasures.
