= Silver Cloud (disambiguation) =

Rolls-Royce Silver Cloud is the main car manufactured by Rolls-Royce from April 1955 until March 1966.

Silver Cloud may also refer to

== Ships ==
- Silver Cloud (ship), a passenger cruise ship that entered service in 1994
- USS Silver Cloud, the name of more than one United States Navy ship
- Silver Cloud (yacht), a SWATH yacht owned by Alex Dreyfoos

== Other uses ==
- "Silver Cloud" (song), a single from La Düsseldorf's 1976 debut album
- Silver Cloud (horse), a racehorse
- Egira conspicillaris, a moth of the family Noctuidae
- Striplin Silver Cloud, ultralight aircraft
