= Small-waterplane-area twin hull =

Ship configuration with submerged twin-hulls

A narrow waterline distinguishes a SWATH ship from a conventional catamaran

A SWATH ship resembles a conventional catamaran. The twin hulls (blue) remain completely submerged.

A small-waterplane-area twin hull, better known by the acronym SWATH, is a catamaran design that minimizes hull cross section area at the sea's surface. Minimizing the ship's volume near the surface area of the sea, where wave energy is located, minimizes a vessel's response to sea state, even in high seas and at high speeds. The bulk of the displacement necessary to keep the ship afloat is located beneath the waves, where it is less affected by wave action. Wave excitation drops exponentially as depth increases, so wave action normally does not affect a submerged submarine at all. Placing the majority of a ship's displacement under the waves is similar in concept to creating a ship that rides atop twin submarines.

== Effects ==
The twin-hull design provides a stable platform and large, broad decks. Compared with conventional catamarans, SWATH vessels have more surface drag, but less wave drag. They are less susceptible to wave motion but more sensitive to payload, which affects draught. Additionally, SWATH vessels cannot operate in planing or semi-planing modes and thus gain no drag reduction when operating at speeds normally associated with such modes. They require a complex control system, have a deeper draft, and have higher maintenance requirements. The design of SWATH vessels is also considerably more complex due to the structural complexities inherent to the design.

== History ==
The SWATH form was invented by Canadian Frederick G. Creed, who presented his idea in 1938, and was later awarded a British patent for it in 1946. The first full-scale SWATH vessel to be built and put into service was MV Duplus, a diving support vessel built in the Netherlands in 1968. In the 1970s, several units were built in different countries (including the RV Kaimalino by the US Navy, and an 80 ft (24 m) ferry in Japan). Since the 1980s, oceanographic research vessels, pilot tenders, yachts and other craft are more routinely being built with the SWATH hull type.

== Specific examples ==
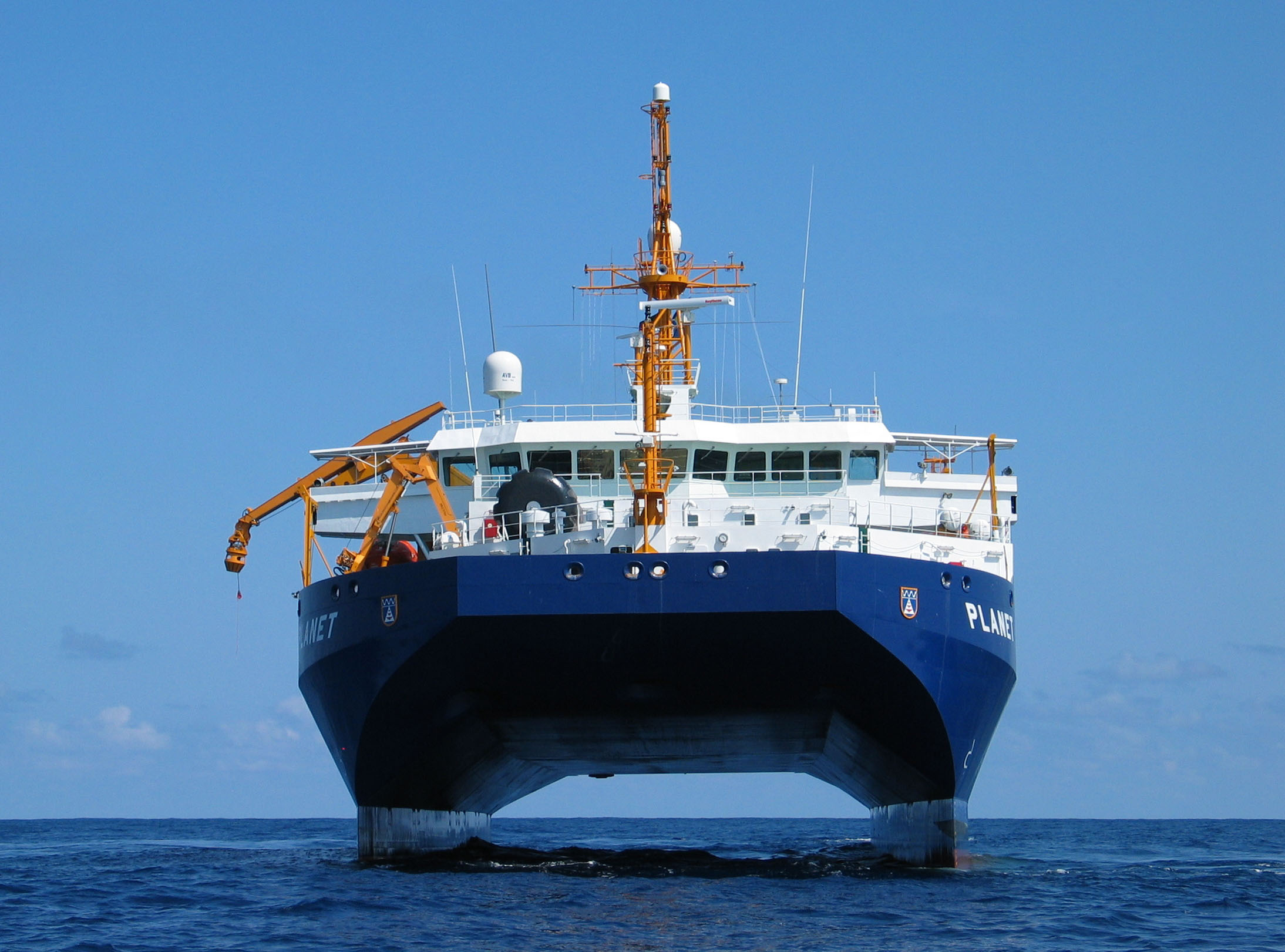
German Navy research ship Planet

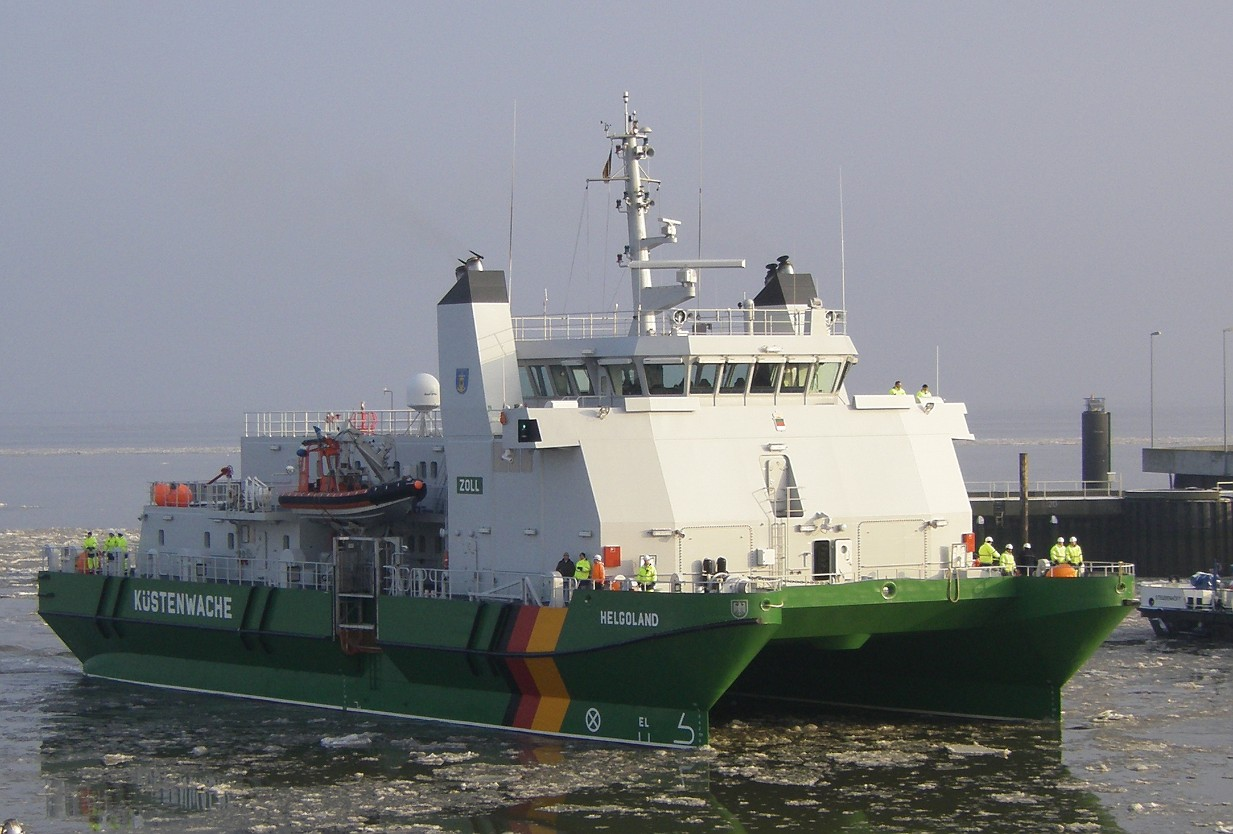
German Federal Coast Guard customs cruiser Helgoland

- Duplus (1969): oil industry support ship, the first SWATH ship built
- Sea Shadow (1984): US Navy experimental stealth ship
- CCGS Frederick G. Creed (1988): Canadian Coast Guard survey ship
- USNS Victorious (T-AGOS-19) (1988): lead ship of class of four US Navy surveillance ships that use a SURTASS
- RV Kaiyo(1985):research vessel operated by the Japan Agency for Marine-Earth Science and Technology
- Hibiki-class ocean surveillance ships, (1991): three patrol vessels operated by the Japan Maritime Self-Defense Force
- MV China Star (ex-Radisson Diamond) (1992): cruise ship, largest SWATH when built, displaces 20,000 t (20,000 long tons; 22,000 short tons)
- RV Western Flyer (1996): Monterey Bay Aquarium Research Institute mothership for the research ROV Doc Ricketts
- HSS 1500 (1996): class of three Finnish high speed ferries withdrawn after a decade due to high fuel consumption
- USNS Impeccable (T-AGOS-23) (2001): US Navy ocean surveillance ship that uses a SURTASS, additional ships cancelled
- RV Kilo Moana (T-AGOR-26) (2001), University of Hawaii oceanographic research vessel
- Planet (2005): German Navy weapons and sonar research ship
- Sea Fighter (2005): US Navy experimental littoral combat ship
- Silver Cloud (2008): 41 m (135 ft) private yacht
- NOAAS Ferdinand R. Hassler (2009), a NOAA hydrographic survey vessel
- Type 639 oceanographic surveillance ship (2009): class of six vessels for the Chinese Navy
- M/V Susitna (2010): ice-capable convertible SWATH/barge
- Ghost (2011): experimental super-cavitating stealth ship
- Skrunda-class patrol boat (2011): class of five 26 m (85 ft) patrol vessels
- Iranian high-aspect-ratio twin-hull vessels

== See also ==
- Multihull – Ship or boat with more than one hull
- M80 Stiletto – Prototype naval stealth vessel
- Catamaran – Watercraft with two parallel hulls of equal size
- Sea Slice – Experimental SWATH vessel, an experimental US Navy ship with multiple SWATH hulls.
- Semi-submersible
- Trimaran – Multihull boat
- Wave-piercing hull – Hull with fine bow with reduced reserve buoyancy
