= RV Kilo Moana =

American oceanographic research vessel

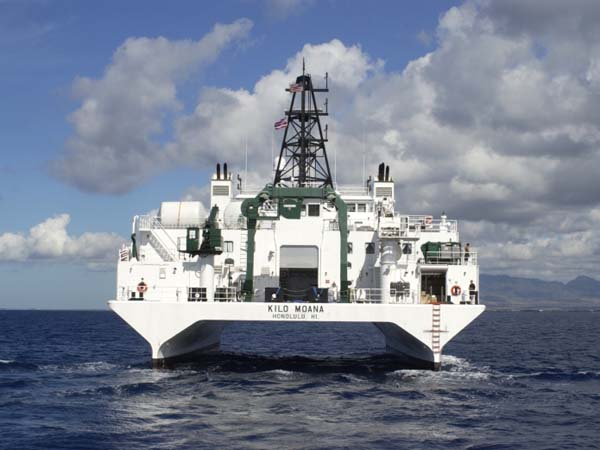
- Stern of the Kilo Moana

History

United States
- Name: Kilo Moana
- Owner: Office of Naval Research
- Builder: Atlantic Marine, Mobile, Alabama
- Laid down: 9 February 2001
- Launched: 17 November 2001
- Acquired: by the U.S. Navy, 3 September 2003; by the University of Hawaii on 3 September 2003
- Identification: IMO number: 9229037; MMSI number: 369565000; Callsign: WDA7827; Hawaii: HA 0532 XS
- Status: in active service

General characteristics
- Class & type: Kilo Moana-class oceanographic research ship
- Tonnage: 3,060 gross tonnage (GT)
- Displacement: 2,547 long tons (2,588 t) at 25 ft (7.6 m) draft
- Length: 186 ft (57 m)
- Beam: 88 ft (27 m)
- Draft: 25 ft (7.6 m) (max), 23 ft (7.0 m) (min)
- Speed: 15 knots (28 km/h; 17 mph) (max)
- Range: 10,000 nmi (19,000 km; 12,000 mi) at 12 knots (22 km/h; 14 mph)
- Endurance: 50 days food/stores/FW
- Capacity: fuel: 130,000 US gal (490,000 L; 110,000 imp gal)
- Crew: 20 plus 28 scientists

RV Kilo Moana (AGOR-26) is a small waterplane area twin hull (SWATH) oceanographic research ship owned by the US Navy and operated by the University of Hawaii as a part of the U.S Academic Research Fleet and a member of University-National Oceanographic Laboratory System (UNOLS). She was designed to operate in coastal and blue water areas. The unique SWATH hull-form provides a comfortable, stable platform in high sea conditions.

In January 2012 Kilo Moana began taking on water from a baseball sized hole in her hull, though the cause of the breach is unknown. The crew of the vessel along with the United States Coast Guard were able to temporarily plug the hole and pump out the flooded spaces. She returned to her homeport of Honolulu safely and entered emergency drydock to repair the damaged hull.

On 20 November 2019, the ship rescued a French-flagged sail catamaran Thetis. That ship with a crew of four was transiting the Austral Islands in French Polynesia when she began to take on water. The American vessel was able to fabricate parts needed to restore watertight integrity and the Thetis was able to continue her passage.

== Construction ==
Kilo Moana was built by Atlantic Marine Jacksonville, Florida, for the Office of Naval Research. She was laid down on 9 February 2001 and launched on 17 November 2001. On 3 September 2003 Kilo Moana was delivered to the Navy as a Kilo Moana-class oceanographic research ship and leased to the University of Hawaii on the same day.

== See also ==
- Oceanography
