= M80 Stiletto =

Prototype naval stealth vessel

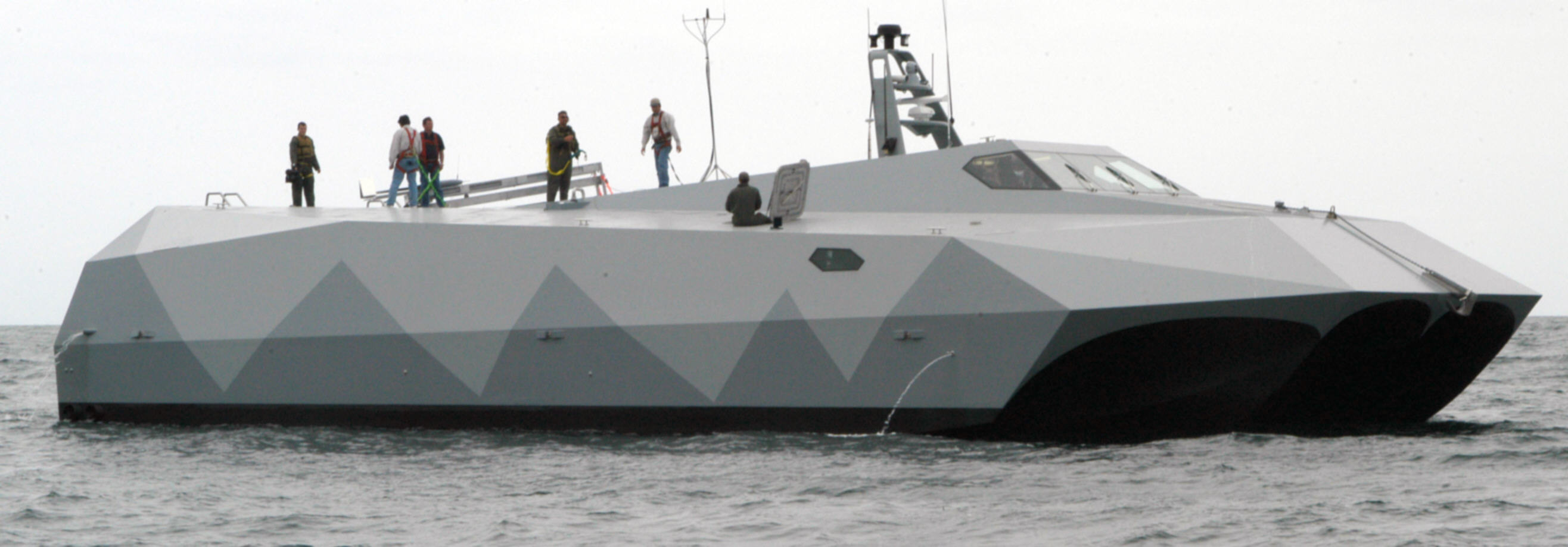

History

United States
- Name: M80 Stiletto
- Operator: U.S. Navy
- Launched: January 31, 2006
- Fate: Trials, Development

General characteristics
- Class & type: Experimental multihull ship
- Displacement: 60 tons full load
- Length: 88.6 ft (27.0 m)
- Beam: 40 ft (12 m)
- Height: 15 ft (5 m)
- Draft: 2.5 ft (0.8 m)
- Propulsion: 4 × 1,650 horsepower C-30 CAT
- Speed: 60 knots (110 km/h) max 40 knots (74 km/h) cruise
- Endurance: 500 nm at full load/ max speed
- Boats & landing craft carried: 1 Rigid hull inflatable boat
- Troops: 12 SEALs
- Complement: 3

The M80 Stiletto is an American prototype naval ship using advanced stealth technologies. The M80 was designed by the M Ship Company then built by Knight and Carver, as an experimental testbed ship for The Pentagon’s Office of Force Transformation. It is notable for its innovative pentamaran hull design and advanced carbon fiber composite construction.

The multihull uses its width to gain stability. Its five slim hulls create virtually no bow wave, thus obviating the "hull speed' limitation of displacement craft. The Stiletto's "double-M hull" enables the craft to achieve a remarkably steady ride in rough seas at high speed. A disadvantage is that the five hulls give a large "wetted area", increasing drag.

== Design ==
The M80 Stiletto is a U.S. Navy vessel designed for combat in shallow coastal waters. The 88-foot (27 m) Stiletto's unusual shape and patented M-hull provides a stable yet fast platform for mounting electronic surveillance equipment or weapons, or for conducting special operations. The hull design allows stability at high speeds and rough conditions without the need for foils or lifting devices.

Its shallow draft means the M80 Stiletto can operate in littoral and riverine environments and potentially for beach landings. The "faceted" design of the frontal aspect is intended to give a low radar signature.

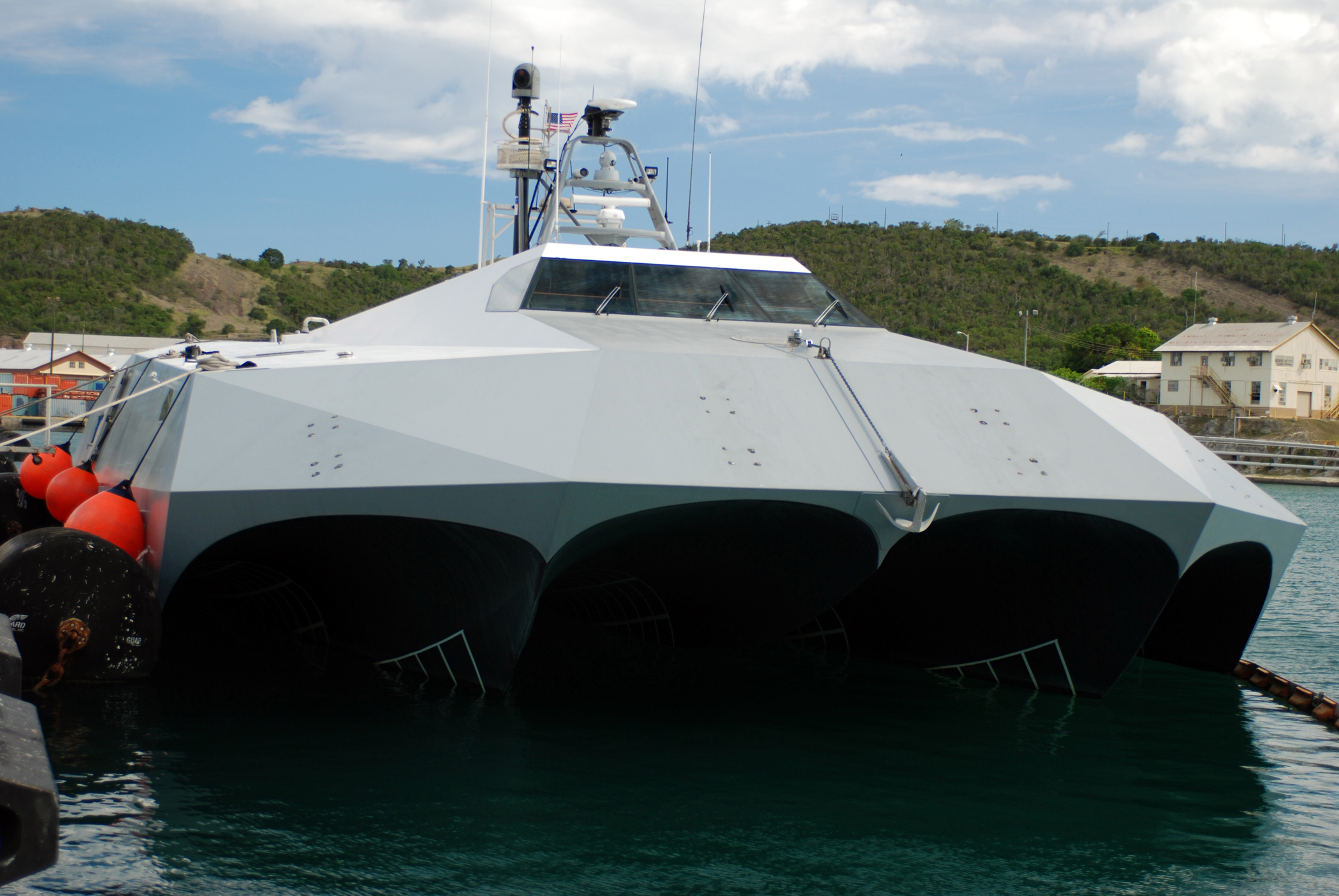
All five hulls are visible in this picture of M80 Stiletto's bow

The M80 Stiletto is equipped with four Caterpillar C32 1232 kW (1652 HP) engines yielding a top speed in excess of 60 knots (110 km/h) and a range of 500 nautical miles (900 km) when fully loaded. Alternatively, it may be fitted with jet drives for shallow-water operations and beaching. It has a topside flight deck for launching and retrieving unmanned aerial vehicles. Its rear ramp can launch and recover an 11-meter rigid-hull inflatable boat or autonomous underwater vehicle.

It weighs 45 tons unloaded, light enough to be hoisted onto a cargo ship, yet it can carry a 20-ton payload. The craft is 88.6 feet (27.0 m) LOA, with a width of 40 feet (12.2 m) and a height of 18.5 feet (5.6 m) and a draft of 2.5 feet (0.8 m). The M80 Stiletto is the largest U.S. naval vessel using advanced carbon-fiber and epoxy composite materials, which yield a light yet strong hull. These craft are expected to cost between $6 and $10 million US Dollars each.

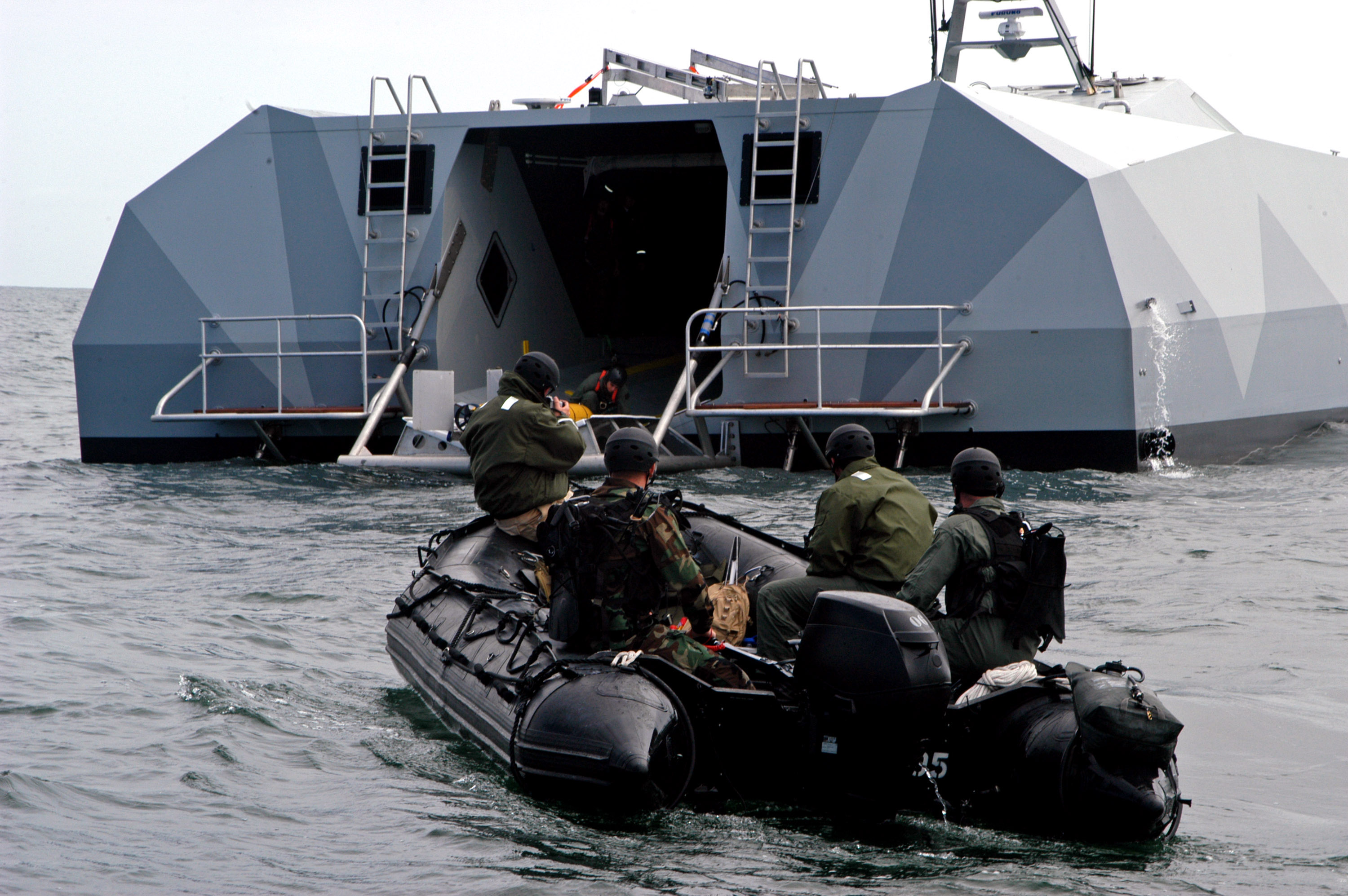
Rear view of M80 Stiletto during a training session with Navy SEALs, 2006.

== Operational history ==
In 2006 and 2007, the Stiletto participated in Trident Warrior exercises, as well as a number of other naval exercises. This included three days of mine-clearing experimentation during Exercise Howler in 2006, when the vessel was operated by the Naval Special Clearance Team-1 (NSCT-1) from the Naval Amphibious Base in Coronado.

A key feature of this vessel is that it can set up a network between a special forces team by launching an unmanned aerial vehicle (UAV) that relays information between the team and boat. The Stiletto can also carry surveillance UAVs to provide reconnaissance for the SEAL team, and, using a clustered supercomputer on board, will be able to send real-time images to the team on shore.

The Stiletto was selected by Time magazine as one of the Best Inventions of 2006 and one of two inventions in the Armed Forces category.

In 2008, the Stiletto deployed on a 70-day mission for USSOUTHCOM as part of a joint agency operation that included the Drug Enforcement Administration and U.S. Coast Guard.

In July 2012, the US Navy deployed the Stiletto to retrieve the NASA Inflatable Reentry Vehicle Experiment 3 (IRVE-3) test article, a 3 m (9.8 ft) diameter heat shield, which splashed down in the Atlantic Ocean off North Carolina after being launched on July 23 by a sounding rocket from NASA's Wallops Flight Facility. The Stiletto is referenced as a maritime demonstration craft operated by the Naval Surface Warfare Center Carderock, Combatant Craft Division, and based at Joint Expeditionary Base Little Creek-Ft Story, Va.

The UK was testing ISR packages compatible with the RQ-20A Puma hand-launched UAV on board the Stiletto in November 2014 under Capability Demonstration 15–1.

== See also ==
- HMS Smyge - Swedish trials ship
- Pentamaran
- Sea Shadow - American experimental stealth ship
- Juliet Marine Systems Ghost
