= Hughes Mining Barge =

US submersible barge

Coordinates: 37.791404°N 122.293196°W

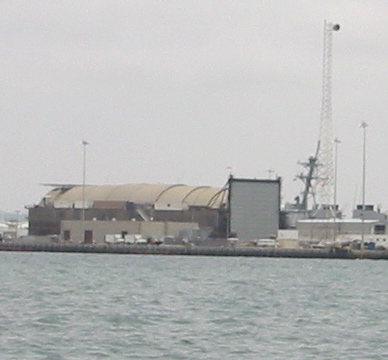
- HMB-1 in San Diego, June 2005

History

United States
- Name: Hughes Mining Barge
- Launched: 1974
- Fate: Sold June 2012

General characteristics
- Type: Submersible barge
- Displacement: 5,800 long tons (5,893 t) light; 10,875 long tons (11,050 t) full load
- Length: 324 ft (99 m)
- Beam: 106 ft (32 m)
- Draft: 13 ft (4.0 m)
- Propulsion: None

The Hughes Mining Barge, or HMB-1, is a submersible barge about 99 m (324 ft) long, 32 m (106 ft) wide, and more than 27 m (90 ft) tall. The HMB-1 was originally developed as part of Project Azorian (more widely, but erroneously, known as "Project Jennifer"), the top-secret effort mounted by the Central Intelligence Agency to salvage the wreckage of the Soviet submarine K-129 from the ocean floor.

The HMB-1 was designed to allow the device that would be used to grasp and lift the submarine to be constructed inside the barge and out of sight, and to be installed in the Glomar Explorer in secrecy. This was done by towing the HMB-1, with the capture device inside, to a location near Catalina Island (off the coast of California), and then submerging it onto stabilizing piers that had been installed on the seafloor. The Glomar Explorer was then maneuvered over the HMB-1, the retractable roof was opened, and the capture device lifted into the massive "moon pool" of the ship, all within clear sight of people on the beach.

After the conclusion of Project Azorian, the HMB-1 was mothballed at the Todd Shipyard in San Francisco, California until November 1982. At that time, the United States Navy towed the huge barge to a Lockheed Martin facility in Redwood City, California, where it became a floating drydock for the construction and sea trials of the Sea Shadow, an experimental stealth ship being tested by the Navy. Sea trials of the Sea Shadow continued until 1986.

== Fate ==
After several attempts to find the vessel a home at a museum, General Services Administration offered the HMB-1 and Sea Shadow for sale as scrap. The vessels were bought by the Bay Ship & Yacht Company of Alameda, California for US$2.5 million in June 2012. Under the terms of the sale Sea Shadow had to be scrapped.

The HMB-1 was refitted at Treasure Island for service as a covered drydock. This enables the shipyard to more easily control waste byproducts, maximize quality control for painting, and avoid loss of productivity due to bad weather.

The overhaul included new equipment to allow the dock to submerge and surface by pumping ballast water, rather than by the previous compressed air system. The barge is no longer capable of submerging completely. Like other floating drydocks, it takes on enough water to allow entry of a vessel, then pumps out ballast until the interior of the dock is above water.

As of August 2013, HMB-1 was moored at the Bay Ship & Yacht Company facility on Main St. in Alameda, CA. In March 2015, the helipad was removed from atop the dry dock.
