= Duplus =

Diving support and sample drilling ship for the petroleum industry

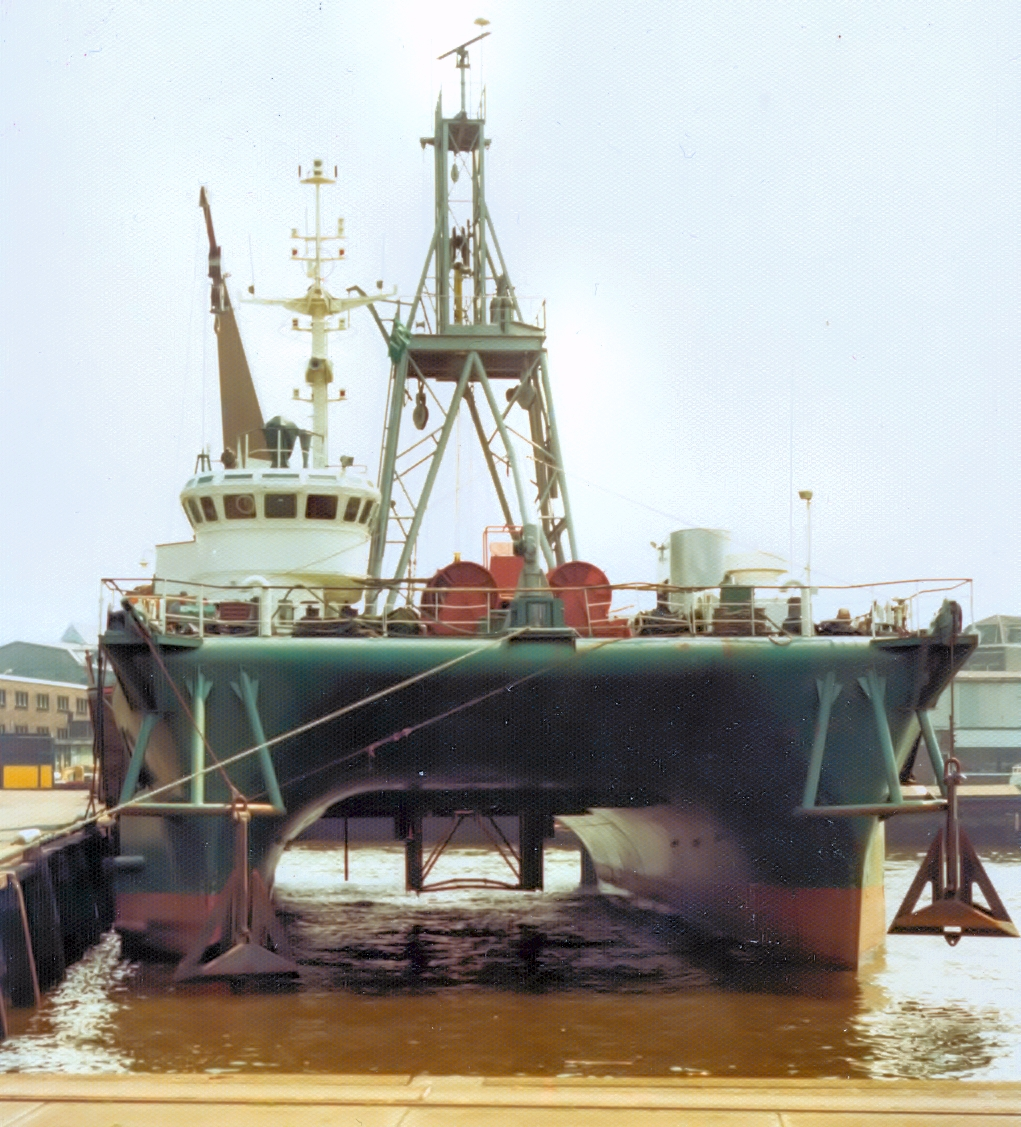
- Duplus in the port of Rotterdam, circa 1972

History
- Name: Duplus, Jaramac 57, Twin Drill
- Owner: Netherlands Offshore Company, McDermott Inc., Int'l Underwater Contractors
- Ordered: 1968
- Builder: Boele's Scheepswerf & Machinefabriek, Bolnes, Netherlands
- Yard number: 1033
- Laid down: 1968
- Launched: 1969
- Identification: IMO number: 6903230
- Fate: Broken up 2004

General characteristics
- Class & type: SWATH
- Decks: 5 partial, 1 of these full
- Propulsion: Diesel-electric; 2x Werkspoor Diesel engines; 4x Voith-Schneider propulsors
- Speed: 11kn
- Crew: 27

Duplus was a diving support and sample drilling ship for the petrol industry. She was designed and built for use in the North Sea towards the end of the 1960s. Most probably, she was the world's first ship built to the SWATH design principle. After two years of trials and initial use, she was rebuilt into a hybrid form between SWATH ship and catamaran.

== History ==
Duplus was designed by the Dutch construction office Trident Offshore. She was built as hull #1033 at Boele's Scheepswerf & Machienefabriek N.V. in Bolnes, Netherlands. In 1969, she was launched and sea trials started. The owners, the Netherlands Offshore Company (original name Nederlandse Maatschappij voor Werken Buitengaats), expected her experimental concept to deliver a usability in rough seas greater than what was known of single-[hull] ships. Starting in 1969, Duplus was active in the North Sea for 15 years, performing duty as a diving support ship, for drilling seabed samples and as a standby vessel. After a sale to McDermott, Inc. in 1980, she was renamed to Jaramac 57 and registered in Panama. In 1984, she was sold to International Underwater Contractors and renamed to Twin Drill. Under this name, she was active in the Gulf of Mexico for another ten years. After being laid up for an extended period, she was broken up in Mobile, AL in 2004.
