= Canadian Hydrographic Service =

Part of the federal department of Fisheries and Oceans Canada

Canadian Hydrographic Service - CHS
- Service hydrographique du Canada - SHC
- Canadian Hydrographic Service Badge

Agency overview
- Formed: 1883
- Headquarters: Ottawa, Ontario
- Minister responsible: Joanne Thompson, Minister of Fisheries
- Agency executive: Manon Larocque, Hydrographer General of Canada and Director General of CHS
- Parent agency: Fisheries and Oceans Canada Science Sector
- Website: charts.gc.ca

Retired Canadian Hydrographic Service logo or crest

The Canadian Hydrographic Service (CHS) is part of the federal department of Fisheries and Oceans Canada and is Canada's authoritative hydrographic office. The CHS represents Canada in the International Hydrographic Organization (IHO).

== Administration and mandate ==
The CHS is administratively part of Fisheries and Oceans Canada's Oceans and Ecosystems Science Sector. According to mandated obligations of the Oceans Act and the Canada Shipping Act, the CHS is led by the Hydrographer General of Canada who is responsible for gathering, managing, transforming and disseminating bathymetric, hydrographic and nautical data and information into paper and electronic nautical charts, as well as publications and "hydrospatial" (blue geospatial) data and services, including updating services of: broadcast Navigational Warnings and/or Notices to Mariners; and, other publications, data and services of: Tide & Current Tables; water levels observations in near-real time, real-time and forecasting; Sailing Directions and hydrospatial dynamic data, products and services primarily for safe and efficient navigation in Canadian waters and much more.

CHS is responsible for leading and coordinating the Government of Canada's implementation of a Marine Spatial (Hydrospatial) Data Infrastructure (HDI=MSDI) as a key oceans and freshwater component of the Canadian Geospatial Data Infrastructure (CGDI). MSDI (or HDI) compatible and interoperable globally within the directions and framework of the United Nations Global Geospatial Information Management (UN-GGIM). Feeding and guiding future needs and requirements, such as standard near real-time and real-time Hydrographic and Hydrospatial Dynamic Products, for safe and efficient navigation, and serve new technologies such as Maritime Autonomous Surface Ships (MASS); in close collaboration with Natural Resources Canada's (NRCan) Mapping and Earth Observation (CCMEO) Branch colleagues.

== History ==
Prior to Confederation, responsibilities for hydrographic survey and chart production in British North America rested with the Royal Navy.

In 1882, the loss of the steamship SS Asia on an uncharted shoal in Georgian Bay resulted in 150 fatalities and was Canada's worst maritime disaster at the time. On August 13, 1883, the Dominion government established the Georgian Bay Survey which was empowered by legislation with the responsibility to survey and chart navigable waters of Georgian Bay and Lake Huron.

Surveying and charting was extended to Canada's Pacific coast in 1891, tidal and current metering nationwide began in 1893, surveying and charting extended to the Maritimes by 1905, and water level gauging of the Great Lakes began in 1912.

In 1904, a Privy Council order renamed the Georgian Bay Survey to the Hydrographic Survey of Canada with some modified responsibilities. In 1913 one of Canada's most famous hydrographic survey vessels, CSS Acadia was commissioned for use on the Atlantic coast. In 1928, the organization was renamed to the Canadian Hydrographic Service. Responsibility was extended on March 31, 1949, with the entry of Newfoundland into Confederation, with CHS taking over surveys and charting around the island of Newfoundland and the coast of Labrador from the Royal Navy.

== Technology ==
CHS is a world leader in the adoption of hydrographic survey technology, as well as in research and development. With responsibility for charting the world's longest coastline (243,792 kilometres) as well as 6.55 million square kilometres of continental shelf and territorial waters (second largest in the world), including extensive inland waterways such as the St. Lawrence Seaway, CHS maintains a world-record inventory of more than 1,000 published charts. As such, the organization was an early adopter of single-beam sonar, radio-navigation positioning systems, and computer processing and storage.

The joint Canada-U.S. DEW Line also necessitated innovative surveying techniques throughout remote northern areas in the Canadian Arctic Archipelago in support of ships carrying logistics and construction material. CHS is one of the only hydrographic offices in the world with the capability to undertake Arctic surveying, frequently operating in waters that are frozen between 10 and 12 months of the year.

CHS has migrated from single-beam sonar to becoming a major user of multi-beam echo-sounder sonar systems coupled with GPS to achieve improved survey accuracies. CHS was also one of the first organizations in the world to develop airborne LiDAR technology, with the LARSEN-500 sensor being used for remote Arctic surveys. Survey data processing software provided by companies such as CARIS and Helical Systems, as well as the development of Oracle Spatial database storage, are spin-offs from research developments at CHS, and are now used throughout the world by other Hydrographic Offices and in the geo-spatial technology industry. CHS demonstrates international leadership in influencing, contributing, developing and adopting: hydrographic standards (S-100); crowd-sourced bathymetry (CSB); satellite-derived bathymetry (SDB); GEneral Bathymetric Charts of the Oceans (GEBCO) and the Seabed2030 project; autonomous hydrographic surface vehicles (AHSV); and the implementation of a Marine Spatial (Hydrospatial) Data Infrastructure (MSDI) as an Hydrospatial Office. CHS is also involved in the successful implementation of new technologies such as: autonomous hydrographic vehicles (surface, underwater, airborne and/or micro-satellites); Maritime Autonomous Surface Ships (MASS); and many more in the context of the emerging hydrographic and hydrospatial artificial intelligence within hydrospatial.

== Department of Fisheries and Oceans ==
Unlike most nations, CHS is not part of Canada's navy, but is rather a civilian scientific organization under the federal government's Department of Fisheries and Oceans (DFO) Science Sector. Most of the survey vessels employed by CHS are nominally crewed and operated by the Canadian Coast Guard, also part of DFO. CHS also works in collaboration with the Royal Canadian Navy and other ships and vessels of opportunity from other international hydrographic offices, primarily the US Office of Coast Survey (OCS) of the National Ocean Service (NOS) of the National Oceanic and Atmospheric Administration (NOAA) and other academic and industry partners.

The incumbent of the Director General of CHS position is also called the "Hydrographer General of Canada" to reflect the important liability associated with the responsibilities coming from the previous original title, "Dominion Hydrographer," which dates to the earliest days of hydrographic surveying in Canada.

== CHS offices ==
- CHS Dartmouth Office, Bedford Institute of Oceanography (BIO), Dartmouth, Nova Scotia - Jeremy Nicholson, Director also responsible for the CHS, St. John's NL Satellite Office
- CHS Sidney Office, Institute of Ocean Sciences (IOS), Sidney, British Columbia - Mariah McCooey, Director
- CHS St. John's Satellite Office, Northwest Atlantic Fisheries Centre (NAFC), St. John's, Newfoundland and Labrador - Jeremy Nicholson, Director + Jason Bartlett, Manager.
- CHS Mont-Joli Office, Maurice Lamontagne Institute (MLI), Mont-Joli, Quebec - Mme Annie Biron, Director, Directrice
- CHS Burlington Office, Bayfield Institute, Canada Centre for Inland Waters (CCIW), Burlington, Ontario - Chris Marshall, Director
- CHS Ottawa Office, Ottawa, Ontario – Manon Larocque, Hydrographer General of Canada and Director General of CHS + Chris Hemmingway, Director Hydrography and Marine Spatial (Hydrospatial) Data Infrastructure (MSDI) + Louis Maltais, Director, Marine Geospatial Services and Support.

== See also ==
- Water Survey of Canada
