= CCGS Frederick G. Creed =

Canadian survey ship built in 1988

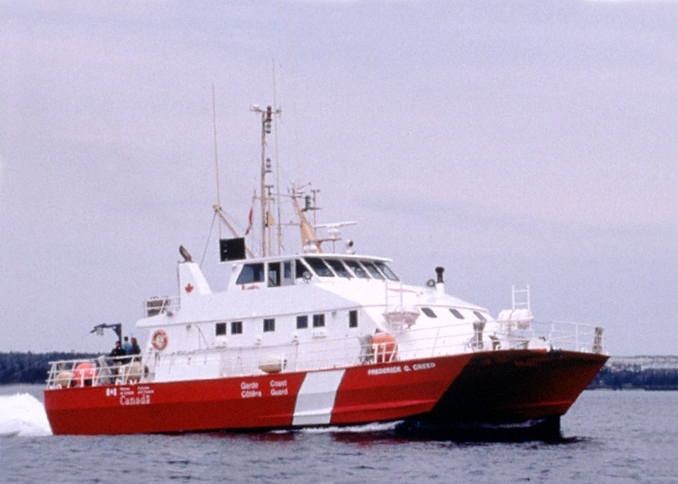
- CCGS Frederick G. Creed

History

Canada
- Name: Frederick G. Creed
- Namesake: Frederick G. Creed
- Operator: Fisheries and Oceans Canada; Canadian Coast Guard
- Port of registry: Ottawa, Ontario
- Builder: Swath Ocean Systems Incorporated, San Diego, California
- Launched: 1988
- Commissioned: 1989
- In service: 1989–2020
- Home port: CCG Base Rimouski, Quebec
- Identification: Call sign: CG3198; IMO number: 8944496; MMSI number: 316001605
- Fate: Broken up for scrap, 2020

General characteristics
- Type: Hydrographic survey vessel
- Tonnage: 152 GT
- Length: 20.4 m (66 ft 11 in)
- Beam: 9.75 m (32 ft 0 in)
- Draught: 2.6 m (8 ft 6 in)
- Propulsion: 2 × Detroit V12 TA diesel engines
- Speed: 16 knots (30 km/h; 18 mph)
- Range: 870 nmi (1,610 km; 1,000 mi)
- Endurance: 3 days
- Complement: 4

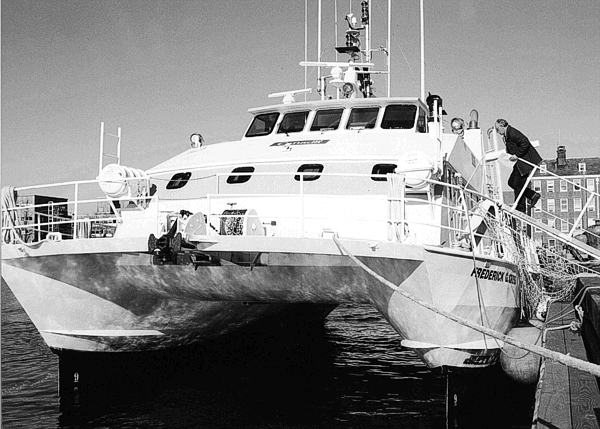
CCGS Frederick G. Creed, working with the scientists at Woods Hole.

CCGS Frederick G. Creed (Note: CCGS stands for Canadian Coast Guard Ship.) was a hydrographic survey vessel operated by the Canadian Coast Guard on behalf of the Canadian Hydrographic Service, a scientific agency of the Department of Fisheries and Oceans. The ship was built in 1988 by Swath Ocean Systems Incorporated of San Diego, California and entered service the same year. The ship was taken out of service in March 2020 and sold for scrap.

== Design and description ==
CCGS Frederick G. Creed, constructed of aluminum, employed a SWATH system and was named after Frederick G. Creed, an inventor and pioneer of this technology. The vessel had a gross tonnage of 152 tons and was 20.4 metres (66 ft 11 in) long with a beam of 9.75 metres (32 ft 0 in) and a draught of 2.6 metres (8 ft 6 in). Frederick G. Creed was powered by two General Motors 12V92 geared diesel engines driving two shafts turning a fixed pitch propeller each. The machinery was rated at 1,600 kilowatts (2,150 bhp) and gave the vessel a maximum speed of 16 knots (30 km/h; 18 mph). (Note: Maginley & Collin have the vessel's speed as high as 21 knots (39 km/h).) Frederick G. Creed had a range of 870 nautical miles (1,610 km; 1,000 mi) at 14 knots (26 km/h; 16 mph) and had capacity for 15 m^{3} (3,300 imp gal) of diesel fuel for an endurance of three days. Frederick G. Creed had one 10 m^{2} (110 sq ft) dry lab aboard and carried one manually-launched rigid-hulled inflatable boat. The vessel had a complement of four personnel, composed of one officer and three crew.

== Construction and service ==
CCGS Frederick G. Creed was built in 1988 by Swath Ocean Systems at their yard in San Diego, California. The vessel entered service with the Canadian Coast Guard in 1989 and is registered in Ottawa, Ontario and rated as a Mid Shore Science Vessel. It was homeported in Rimouski, Quebec and was used to perform surveys of the Laurentian and Maritimes regions. Frederick G. Creed was sent to Cape Hatteras to perform wave dynamic studies. In March 2020, the vessel was declared surplus and sold for scrap. Demolition was completed in December 2020.
