= Office of Force Transformation =

The United States Department of Defense Office of Force Transformation (OFT) was established October 29, 2001 in the Office of the Secretary of Defense. Secretary of Defense Donald Rumsfeld called for the creation of this new office to support his transformation vision along with President George W. Bush’s broad mandate to transform U.S. military capabilities. The transformation process intends to challenge the status quo with new concepts for American defense to ensure an overwhelming and continuing competitive advantage. The Director, Force Transformation serves as advocate, focal point, and catalyst for transformation among the Department, reporting directly to the Secretary and Deputy Secretary of Defense.

On October 1, 2006, the Office of Force Transformation was disestablished, and its functions spread between the Office of the Under Secretary of Defense for Policy, and the Office of the Under Secretary of Defense for Acquisition, Technology, and Logistics.

OFT structure - source Center for Defense Information, 2002

== Leadership ==
Vice Admiral (ret.) Arthur K. Cebrowski (often called the "Godfather" of Network Centric Warfare) was appointed by the Secretary of Defense as the 1st Director, Force Transformation, October 29, 2001 to February 2, 2005, a position which reported directly to the Secretary and Deputy Secretary of Defense. Terry J. Pudas became the Acting Director until October 1, 2006, when he became the Acting Deputy Assistant Secretary of Defense for Forces Transformation and Resources.

== Defense Transformation ==
OFT transformation plan includes changing the force and its culture from the bottom up through large amounts of experimentation, increased sharing of new knowledge and experiences, and by broadening military capabilities while mitigating risk. One of the pillar theories driving OFT is Network Centric Warfare (NCW), also known as Network Centric Operations, which according to OFT is a theory of war in the Information Age and the organizing principle for national military planning and joint concepts, capabilities, and systems.

According to Cebrowski, "[Defense] Transformation is foremost a continuing process. It does not have an end point. Transformation is meant to create or anticipate the future. Transformation is meant to deal with the co-evolution of concepts, processes, organizations and technology. Change in any one of these areas necessitates change in all. Transformation is meant to create new competitive areas and new competencies. Transformation is meant to identify, leverage and even create new underlying principles for the way things are done. Transformation is meant to identify and leverage new sources of power. The overall objective of these changes is simply—sustained American competitive advantage in warfare."

The Defense Department's April 2003 "Transformation Planning Guidance" document defines transformation as "a process that shapes the changing nature of military competition and cooperation through new combinations of concepts, capabilities, people, and organizations that exploit out nation's advantages and protect against our asymmetric vulnerabilities to sustain our strategic position, which helps underpin peace and stability in the world."

OFT engaged in several project aimed at transforming the Defense Department through experimentation within exercises. Some of its major projects included Operationally Responsive Space and Stiletto, and it produced strategies that helped to form DeVenCI. OFT was also engaged in funding projects and developing concepts for reconstruction and stabilization as early as 2003.

== What sets OFT apart ==
According to OFT, they:

- Are the only office solely dedicated to transformation;
- Strive to link creativity to implementation;
- Work at the intersection of unarticulated needs and non-consensual change;
- Identify and manage disruptive innovation;
- Work outside the normal course of business activities;
- Entrepreneurial mindset;
- Use concept-technology pairing to explore; and
- Experiment with new ways of operating.

== See also ==
- M80 Stiletto
