= German research ship Planet =

German naval research ship

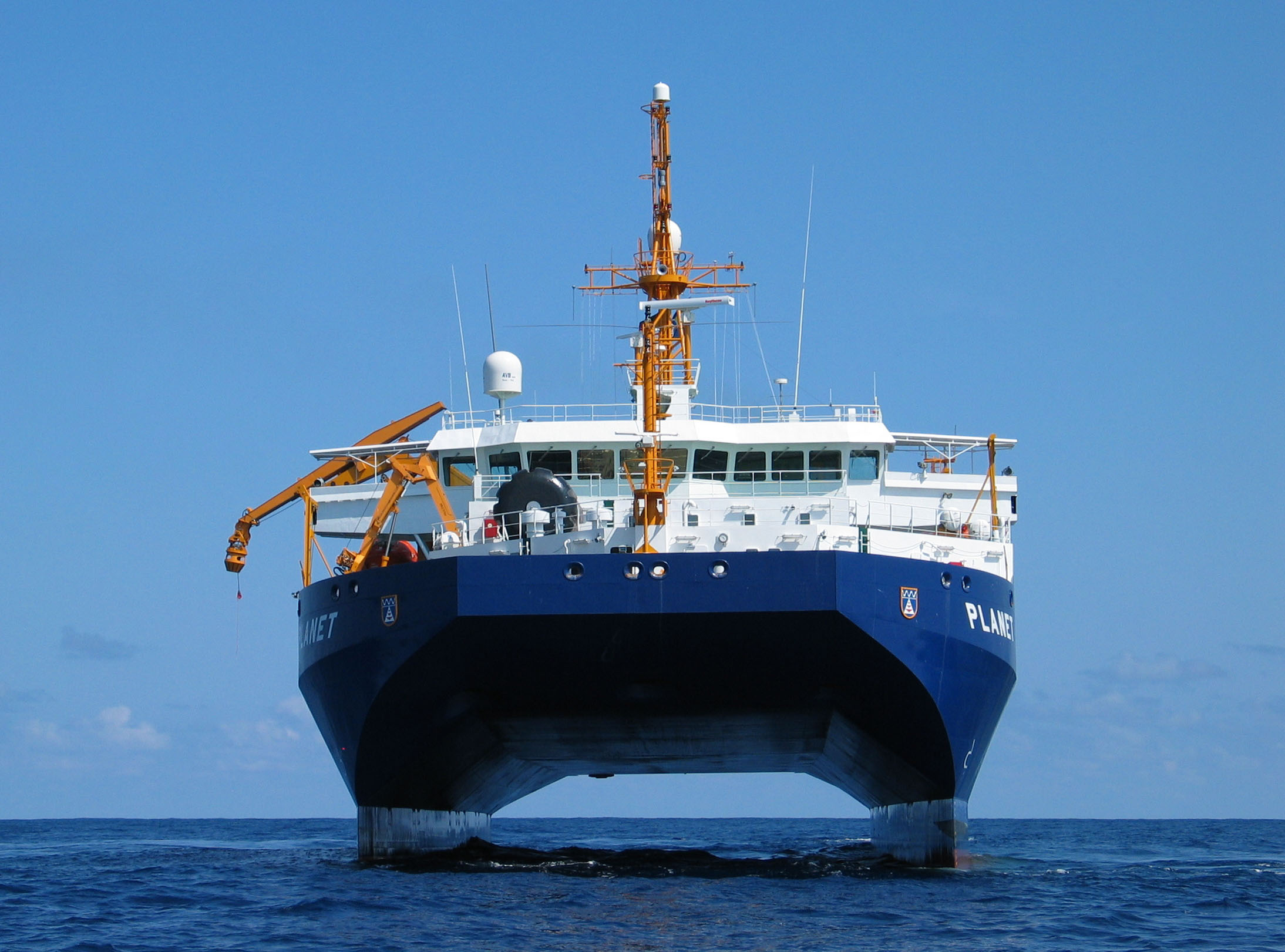
- Planet

History

Germany
- Name: Planet
- Identification: IMO number: 9245732; MMSI number: 211909000; Callsign: DRLA
- Status: In active service

General characteristics
- Type: Research ship
- Displacement: 3,500 tonnes (3,445 long tons)
- Length: 73 m (239 ft 6 in)
- Beam: 27.20 m (89 ft 3 in)
- Draft: 6.80 m (22 ft 4 in)
- Speed: 15 knots (28 km/h; 17 mph)
- Complement: 20 (+ 20 scientists)

Planet of the German Navy is the most modern naval research ship within NATO. It was built as a SWATH design in order to reduce the hull volume and to increase the ship's stability, particularly in high seas and at high speed.

It is used for geophysics and naval technology trials and research. While technically not armed, it is equipped with torpedo launch capability. Other weapons systems can be installed for weapon trials.

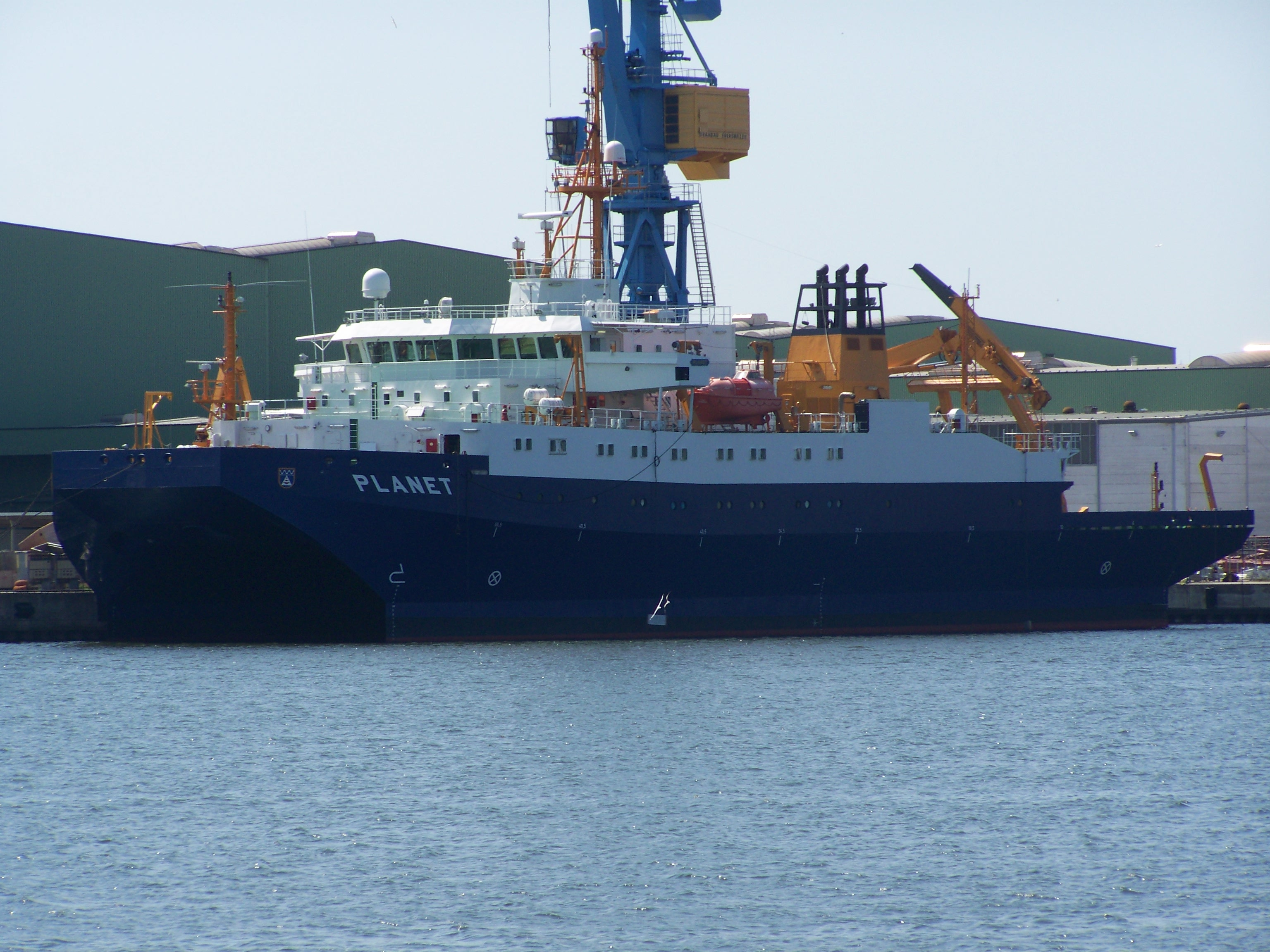
Planet in 2008
