= Maurice Lamontagne Institute =

Marine science research institute in Mont Joli, Quebec, Canada

Coordinates: 48.639306°N 68.157228°W

The Maurice Lamontagne Institute is a marine science research institute located in Mont Joli, Quebec and is part of the Canadian Department of Fisheries and Oceans.

== History ==
The Maurice Lamontagne Institute was created in 1987. Its mission was to help the Department of Fisheries and Oceans gather and organize documentary resources for the needs of the Québec region.

== Description ==
The Maurice Lamontagne Institute employs around 300 people. Its fields of focus are ocean science and aquatic ecosystems management. Its activities include research on aquatic invasive species, fish stocks and marine mammals, and ocean ecosystem dynamics, forecasting and monitoring of water levels, and developing technological solutions for navigation.

The institute covers an area of 25,000 square metres and has 70 labs onsite.

== Library ==
The library of the Maurice Lamontagne Institute focuses on specialized collections concerning oceans in Québec and in Canada. The library's collection is made of 61,000 monographs and 1100 periodicals.

== Research ==
Researchers at the institute have access to the following vessels:

- CCGS Calanus II
- CCGS Frederick G. Creed
- CCGS Martha L. Black
- CCGS Alfred Needler
- CCGS Hudson
- CCGS Teleost
