= Frederick G. Creed =

Frederick George Creed (6 October 1871 – 11 December 1957) was a Canadian inventor, who spent most of his adult life in Britain. He worked in the field of telecommunications, and is particularly remembered as a key figure in the development of the teleprinter. He also played an early role in the development of SWATH vessels.

== Early life ==
Creed was born in Mill Village, Nova Scotia, and at the age of 15 began his working life as a check boy for Western Union in Canso, where he taught himself cable and landline telegraphy. He then worked for the Central and South American Telegraph and Cable Company in Peru and Chile.

== The teleprinter ==
Working in the company’s office in Iquique, Chile, he became tired of using hand-operated Morse keys and Wheatstone tape punches, and came up with the idea of a typewriter-style machine that would allow the operator to punch Morse code signals onto paper tape simply by pressing the appropriate character key.

Creed quit his job and moved to Glasgow, Scotland, where he began work in an old shed. Using an old typewriter bought from the Sauchiehall Street market, he created his first keyboard perforator, which used compressed air to punch the holes. He also created a reperforator (receiving perforator) and a printer. The reperforator punched incoming Morse signals onto paper tape and the printer decoded this tape to produce alphanumeric characters on plain paper. This was the origin of the Creed High Speed Automatic Printing System.

Although told by Lord Kelvin that "there is no future in that idea", Creed managed to secure an order for 12 machines from the British General Post Office in 1902. He opened a small factory in Glasgow in 1904. Two years later the Glasgow Herald adopted the Creed system, claiming that it was three times faster than the rival Morse apparatus.

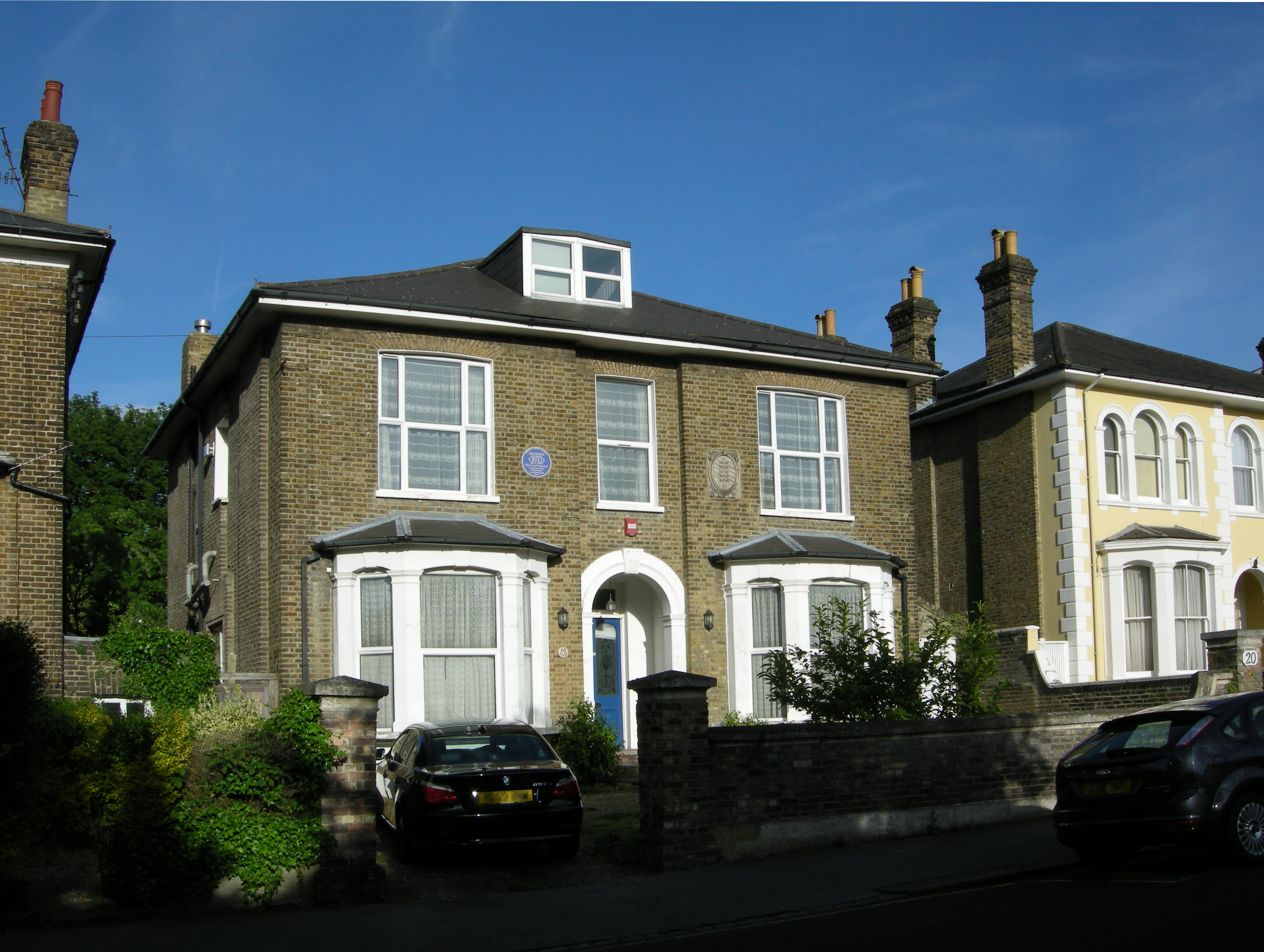
Creed's home at 20, Outram Road, Addiscombe, where he lived in later life, marked with a blue plaque

In 1909, in order to be closer to the Post Office headquarters in London, Creed moved along with 6 of his mechanics to Croydon. Working with Danish telegraph engineer Harald Bille, he established Creed, Bille & Company Ltd. in 1912, with Bille as managing director. After Bille's death in a railway accident in 1916, his name was dropped from the company's title and it became simply Creed & Company.

Creed's system received a major boost that same year when the Daily Mail newspaper adopted it for daily transmission of the entire contents of its newspaper from London to Manchester. In 1913, the first experiments were made in high-speed telegraphy by radio transmission between the Croydon factory and Creed's home about 5 kilometres (3.1 mi) away. However, the outbreak of World War I in 1914 diverted the company's activities to military equipment.

In 1915, with production continually expanding, the company found its original premises inadequate and moved to East Croydon. It spent most of World War I producing high-quality instruments, manufacturing facilities for which were very limited in the UK. Among the items produced were amplifiers, spark-gap transmitters, aircraft compasses, high-voltage generators, bomb release apparatus, and fuzes for artillery shells and bombs.

Following the War, in 1920 the Press Association set up a private news network using several hundred Creed teleprinters to serve practically every daily morning newspaper in the UK and for many years was the world's largest private teleprinter network. Other companies followed suit in Australia, Denmark, India, South Africa, and Sweden.

In 1924 Creed entered the teleprinter field with their Model 1P, which was soon superseded by the improved Model 2P. In 1925 Creed acquired the patents for Donald Murray's Murray code, a rationalised Baudot code, and it was used for their new Model 3 Tape Teleprinter of 1927. This machine printed received messages directly onto gummed paper tape at a rate of 65 words per minute and was the first combined start-stop transmitter-receiver teleprinter from Creed to enter mass production.

== Later projects ==
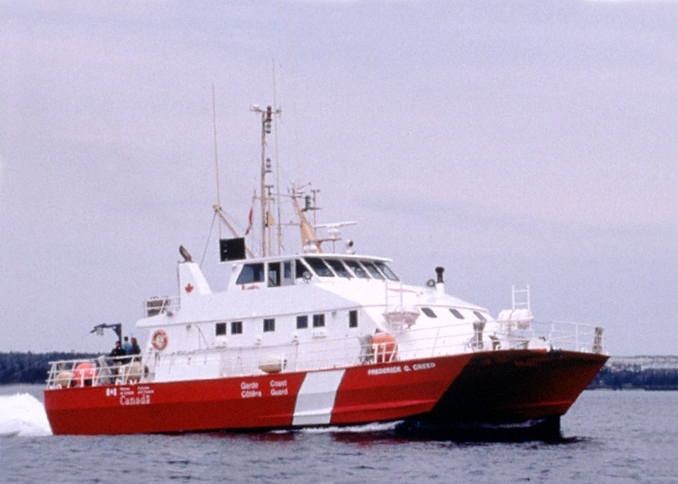
Canadian Coast Guard vessel Frederick G. Creed, using SWATH design pioneered by Creed.

In July 1928 Creed & Company became part of IT&T and Creed retired in 1930, turning his attention to other less successful projects, including a mid-Atlantic "Sea Drome", first patented in 1919, and an unsinkable boat. He invented the SWATH (small-waterplane-area twin hull) before 1938, when he presented it to the British Admiralty, and was awarded a British patent for it in 1946. He died before it ever saw commercial development, the first vessel being launched by the Netherlands in 1968.

== Death ==
Creed died at his home in Croydon in 1957 at the age of 86.

== Commemoration ==
Creed's former home at 20, Outram Road, Addiscombe, East Croydon, is marked with a commemorative English Heritage blue plaque, erected in 1973. The front wall also features a logo of the Creed Company carved in relief in stone.

The CCGS Frederick G. Creed, a SWATH vessel launched in 1988, was named after him. It was taken out of service in 2020.

== Family ==
Creed's first wife was the Scottish-born Jane "Jennie" Russell (1868/9–1945), whom he met in Chile and married in 1896. She died in 1945, having borne 4 children. In 1947, aged 75, he married as his second wife Valerie Leopoldine Gisella Layton, née Franzky (1906–1994). One of his sons from his first marriage, Gavin L. Creed, was a minor poet. During World War II, while serving in the Royal Canadian Air Force, Gavin Creed published For Freedom (1942).
