= Silver Cloud (yacht) =

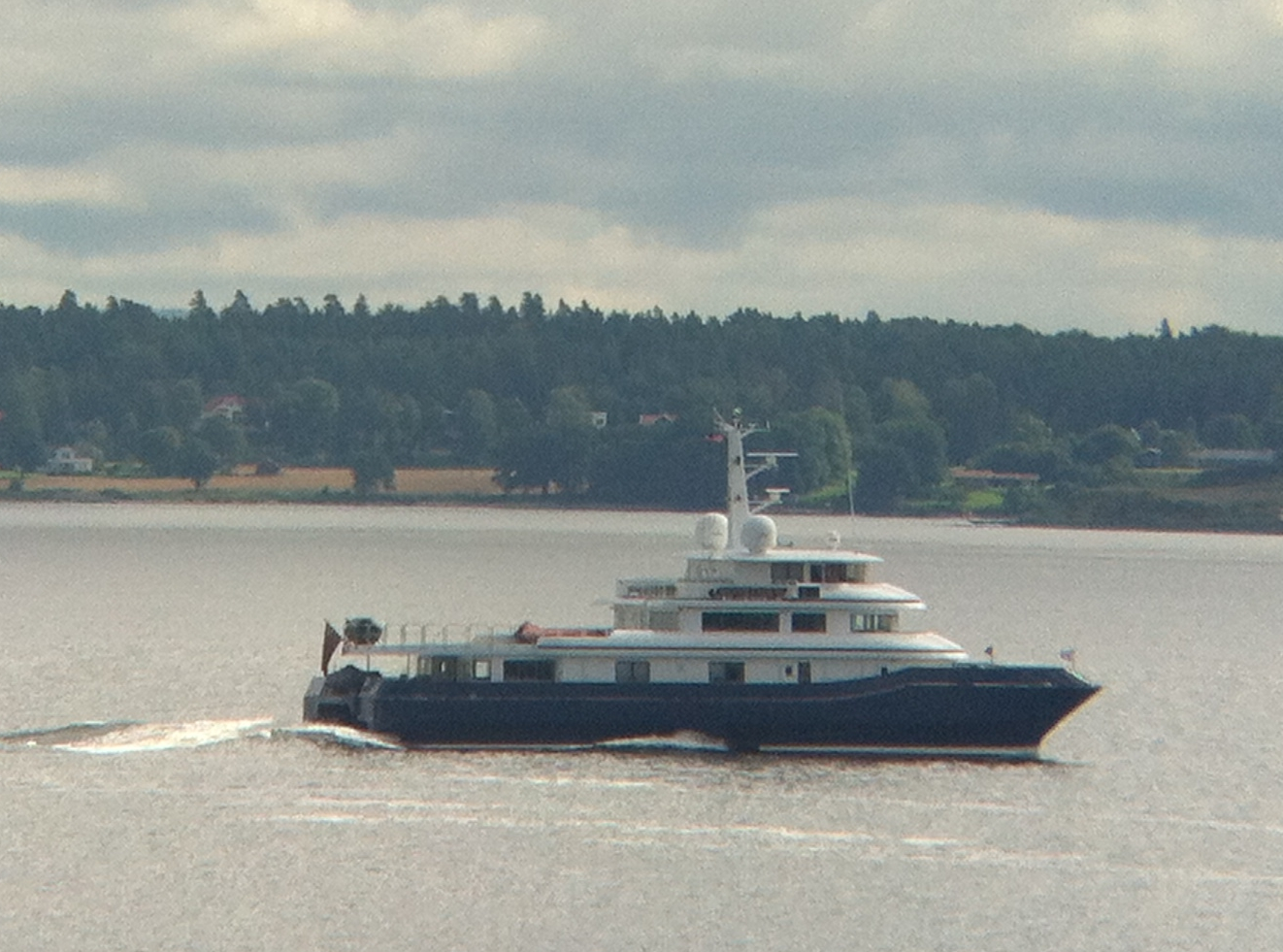
- Silver Cloud southbound at Jeløya, Moss, Norway

History

Cayman Islands
- Name: Silver Cloud
- Builder: Abeking & Rasmussen
- Completed: 2008
- Identification: IMO number: 9514860; MMSI number: 319440000; Callsign: ZCXJ8

General characteristics
- Type: SWATH
- Displacement: 600 long tons (610 t)
- Length: 134 ft (41 m)
- Beam: 58 ft (18 m)
- Draft: 13.5 ft (4.1 m)
- Propulsion: Diesel
- Speed: 14.2 knots (26.3 km/h; 16.3 mph)
- Range: 3,500 nm @ 10 knots

Silver Cloud is a private yacht owned by Alexander Dreyfoos. It is a 134 ft SWATH (Small-Waterplane-Area Twin Hull) vessel, built by Abeking & Rasmussen in Lemwerder, Germany, in 2008. It is believed to be the first yacht employing the SWATH technology.

The SWATH technology was until 2008 primarily used only in pilot tenders, and military and research vessels. The use of a pair of cylindrical hulls, a bit like small torpedoes, connected by slender struts to the superstructure places most of the ship's displacement below the water's surface, in calm water. This results in an extremely stable platform. At the time the Silver Cloud was built, only an estimated 20 SWATH vessels were in use in the world.

The Silver Cloud's beam is 58 feet, balanced by a 13.5 foot draft, with a cruising speed of 12.5 knots (14 knots maximum).
