= Sea Shadow (IX-529) =

American experimental stealth ship

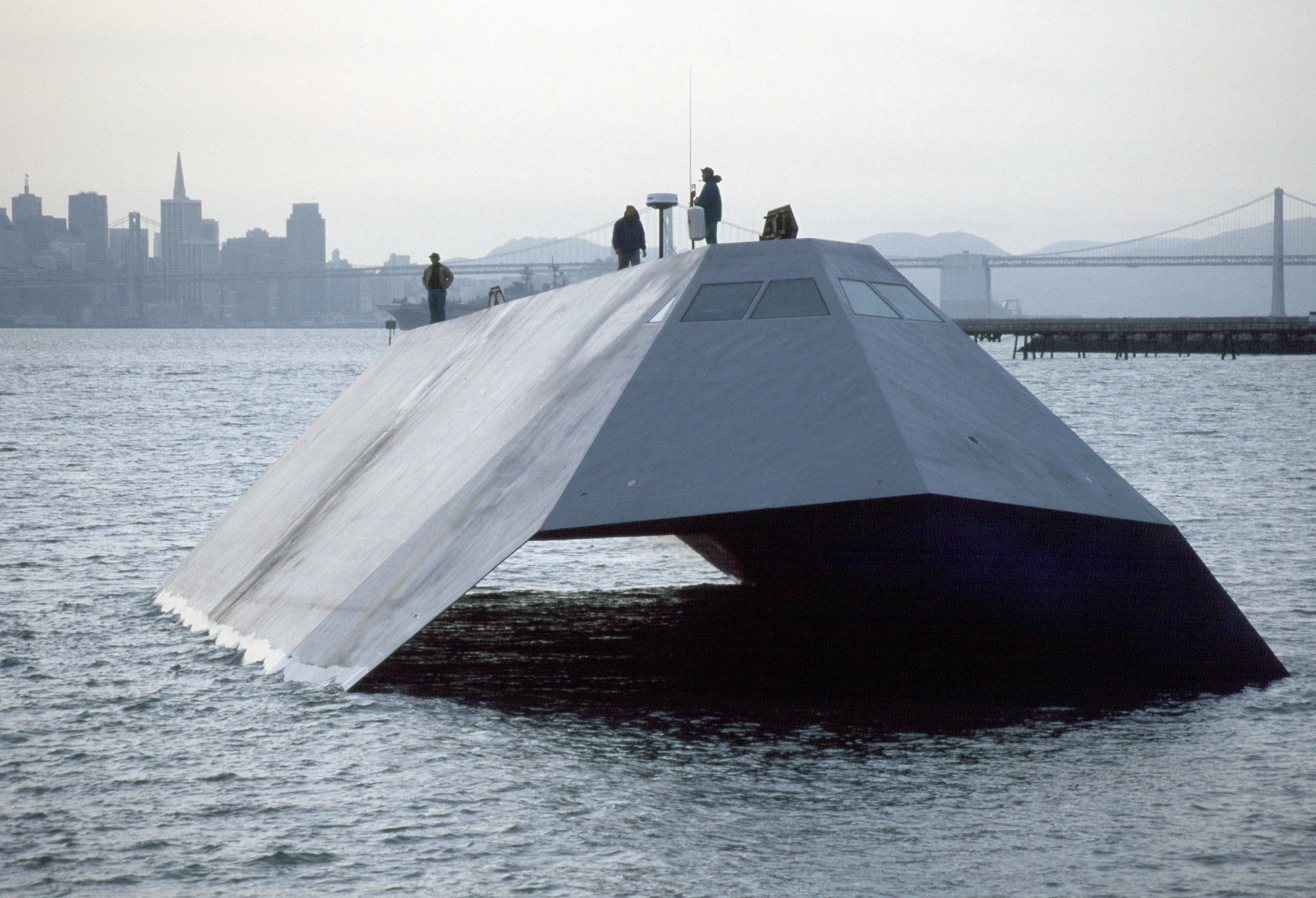
- Sea Shadow sailing through Californian waters near San Francisco in March 1999

History

United States
- Name: Sea Shadow
- Awarded: 22 October 1982
- Builder: Lockheed Shipbuilding and Construction Company
- Completed: 1984
- Acquired: 1 March 1985
- Out of service: September 2006
- Stricken: September 2006
- Fate: Scrapped in 2012

General characteristics
- Type: Stealth ship
- Displacement: 563 long tons (572 t)
- Length: 164 ft (50 m)
- Beam: 68 ft (21 m)
- Draft: 15 ft (4.6 m)
- Propulsion: Diesel–electric
- Speed: 14.2 knots (26.3 km/h; 16.3 mph)
- Complement: 4
- Armament: None

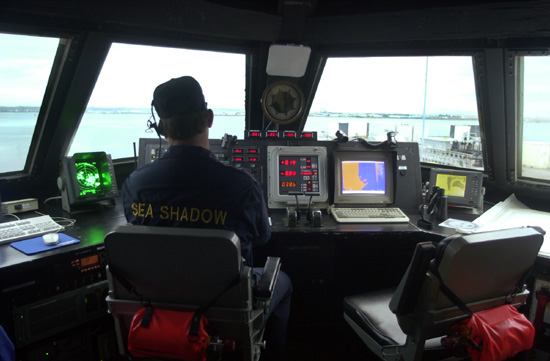
Sea Shadow bridge

Sea Shadow (IX-529) was an experimental stealth ship built by Lockheed for the United States Navy to determine how a low radar profile might be achieved and to test high-stability hull configurations that have been used in oceanographic ships.

== Development ==
Sea Shadow was built in 1984 to examine the application of stealth technology on naval vessels and was used in secret until a public debut in 1993. In addition, the ship was designed to test the use of automation to reduce crew size. The ship was created by the Defense Advanced Research Projects Agency (DARPA), the U.S. Navy and Lockheed. Sea Shadow was developed and built at Lockheed's Redwood City, California, facility, inside the Hughes Mining Barge (HMB-1), which functioned as a floating dry dock during construction and testing.

== History ==
Sea Shadow had a SWATH (small-waterplane-area twin hull) design. Below the water were submerged twin hulls, each with a propeller, aft stabilizer, and inboard hydrofoil. The portion of the ship above water was connected to the hulls via the two angled struts. The SWATH design helped the ship remain stable in rough water up to sea state 6 (wave height of 18 feet (5.5 m) or "very rough" sea). The shape of the superstructure was sometimes compared to the casemate of the ironclad ram CSS Virginia of the American Civil War.

Sea Shadow had 12 bunks, one small microwave oven, a refrigerator and table. It was not intended to be mission-capable and was never commissioned, although it was listed in the Naval Vessel Register.

Sea Shadow was revealed to the public in 1993 and was housed at the San Diego Naval Station until September 2006, when it was relocated with the Hughes Mining Barge to the Suisun Bay Reserve Fleet in Benicia, California. Until 2006, Sea Shadow and the HMB-1 were maintained and operated by Lockheed Martin for the U.S. Navy. The vessels were available for donation to a maritime museum.

The USNS Impeccable and USNS Victorious ocean surveillance ships have inherited the stabilizer and canard method to help perform their stability-sensitive intelligence collection missions.

In 2006, the U.S. Navy tried to sell Sea Shadow to the highest bidder; after the initial offering met with a lack of interest, it was listed for dismantling sale on gsaauctions.gov. The U.S. government mandated that the buyer not sail the ship and be required to scrap it. The ship was finally sold in 2012. Sea Shadow was dismantled in 2012 by Bay Ship & Yacht Company of Alameda, California.

== In popular culture ==
In the 1997 James Bond film Tomorrow Never Dies, media tycoon Elliot Carver (Sir Jonathan Pryce) operated a stealth ship that resembled Sea Shadow. Christened Sea Dolphin II in the film, the secret and stealthy floating lair was used as a plot device to attempt to initiate World War III.

The 1994 video game Urban Strike features Sea Shadow as an enemy unit. Its 1997 sequel, Nuclear Strike features the craft as home base.

A fictional version of the craft appears three times in the single-player campaign of Act of War: High Treason (a 2006 real-time strategy game by Eugen Systems) as an enemy unit.

== See also ==
- Skjold-class corvette, stealth missile coastal corvette in service with the Royal Norwegian Navy
- Visby-class corvette, a stealth ship currently in service with the Swedish Navy
- Zumwalt-class destroyer
- Sea Hunter
- Juliet Marine Systems Ghost
