= Stealth ship =

Ship which uses stealth technology to reduce risk of detection

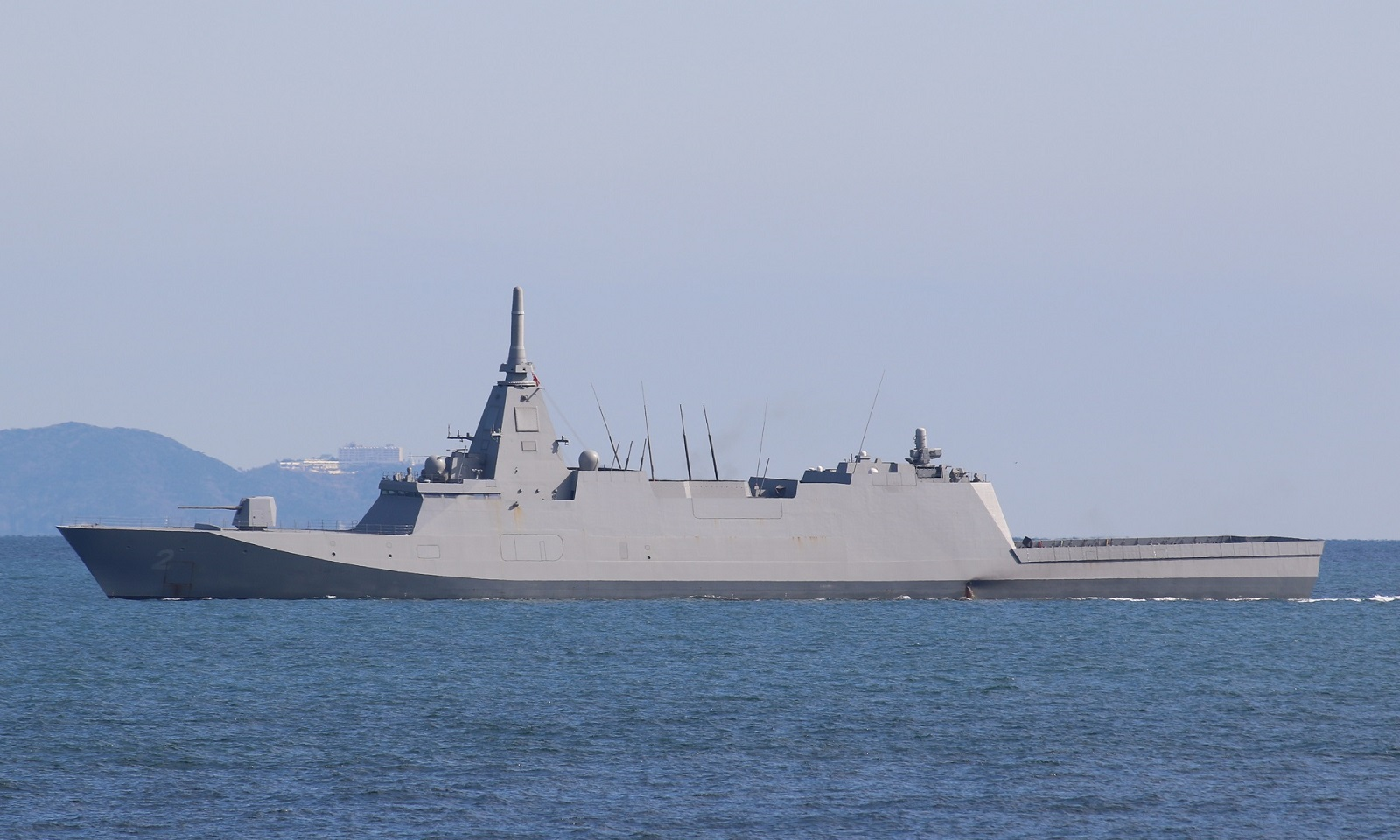
JS Kumano, a Japanese stealth frigate, an example of a stealth ship.

A stealth ship uses stealth technology to avoid detection through a combination of reduction of radar, infrared, visible light, radio frequency, and acoustic signatures.

Stealth ships designs can borrow from stealth aircraft technology, although some aspects such as wake and acoustic signature reduction (acoustic quieting) are unique to stealth ships' design. Although radar cross-section (RCS) reduction is a fairly new concept, many other forms of masking a ship have existed for centuries or even millennia.

== Radar Cross Section (RCS) reduction ==
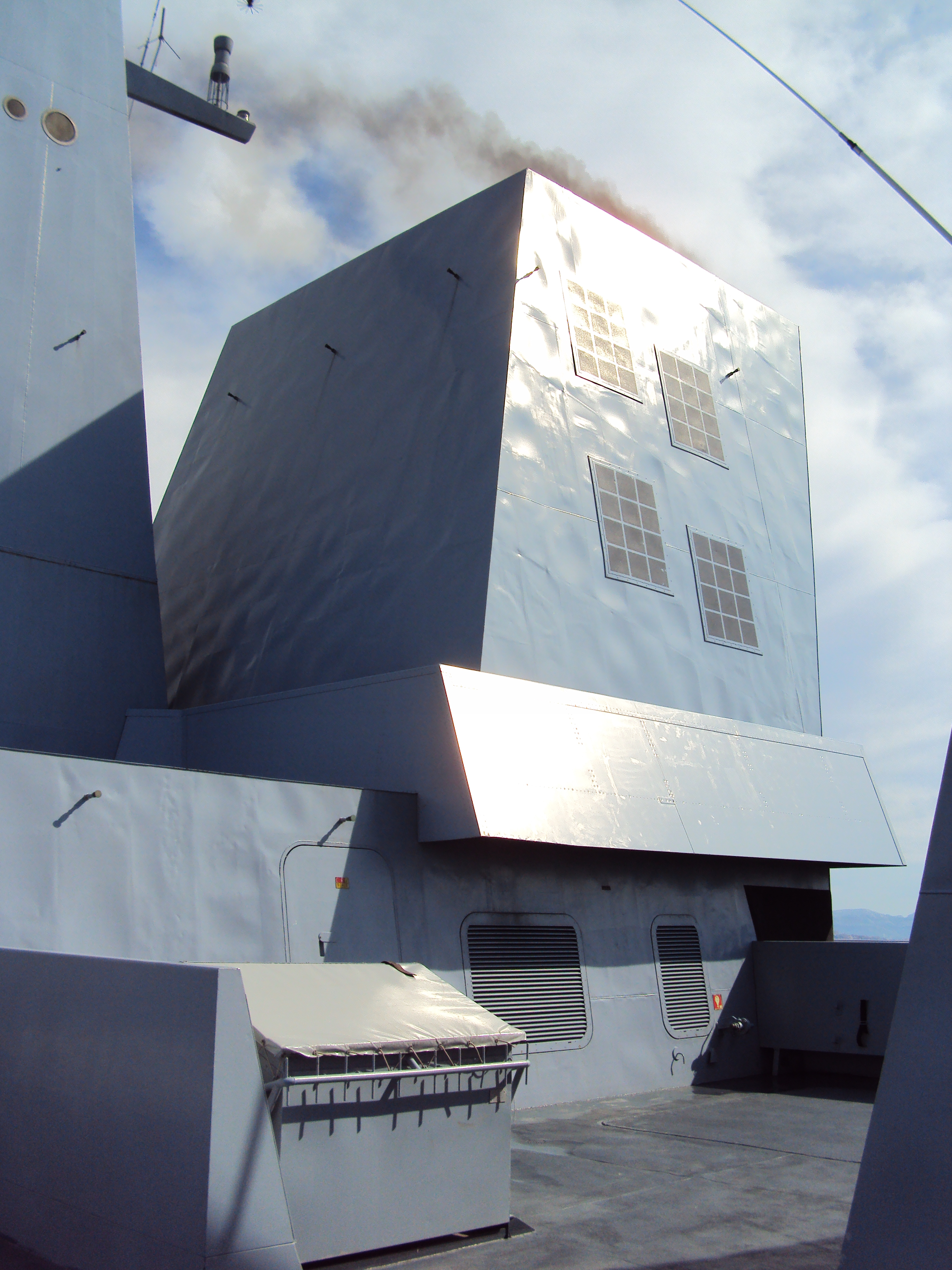
Detail of Forbin, a modern frigate of the French navy. The faceted appearance reduces radar cross-section for stealth.

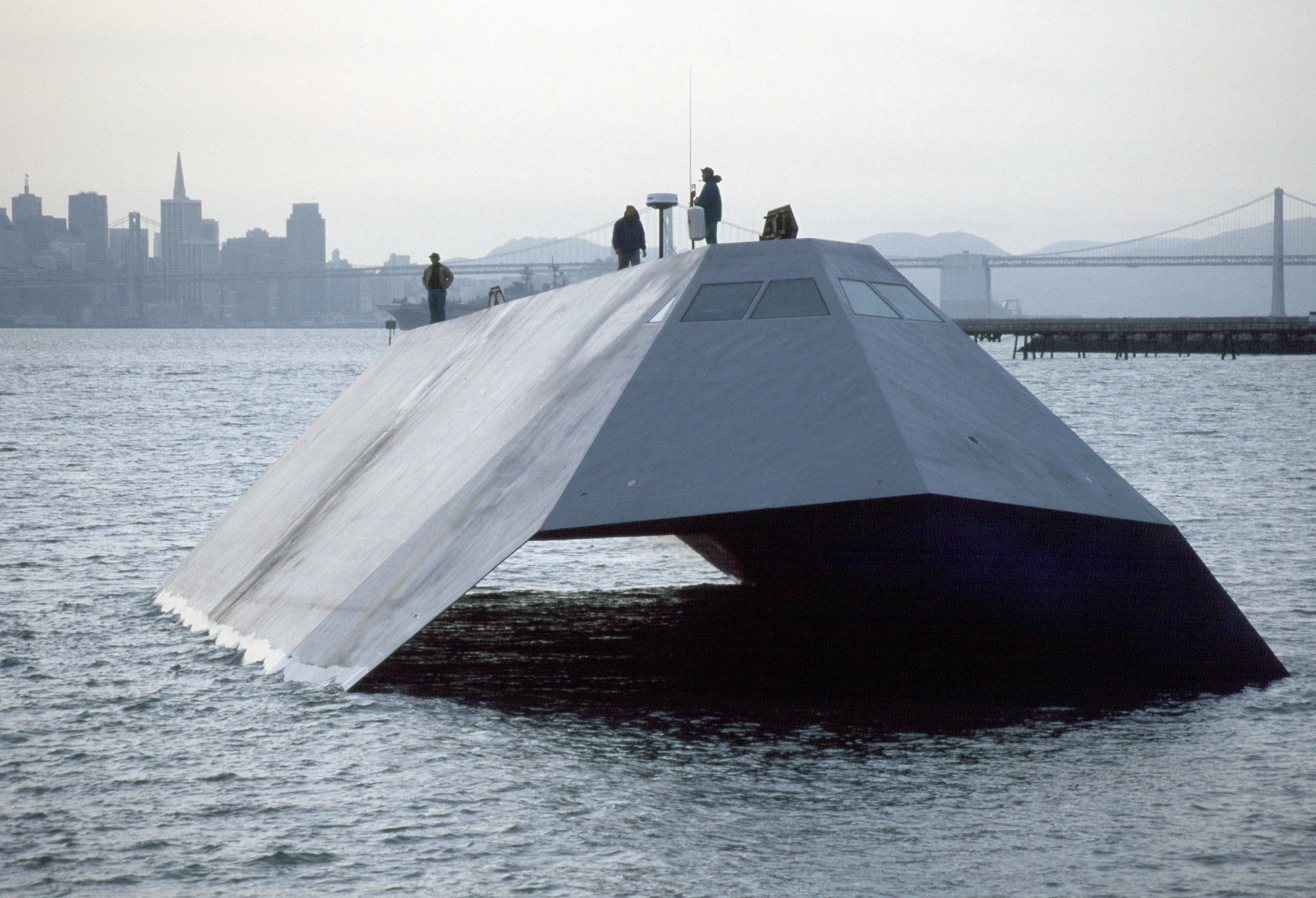
US Navy Sea Shadow uses both a tumblehome hull and SWATH to reduce its radar return. But fully stealth ship designs are rare.

In designing a ship with a reduced radar signature, the main concerns are radar beams originating near or slightly above the horizon (as seen from the ship) coming from distant patrol aircraft, other ships, or sea-skimming anti-ship missiles with active radar seekers. Therefore, the shape of the ship avoids vertical surfaces, which are effective at reflecting such beams directly back to the emitter. Retro-reflective right angles are eliminated to avoid the cat's eye effect. A stealthy ship shape can be achieved by constructing the hull and superstructure with a series of slightly protruding and retruding surfaces. Furthermore, round shapes on the ship are eliminated or covered up, examples being smokestacks and gun turrets. Also, cavities that present a horizontal face are to be eliminated since they are very visible to radar. To bypass these limitations, many ships use features such as panels that cover reflective surfaces or use alternate designs of hardware. Additionally, efforts are made to minimize gaps on the ship. Hull shapes include tumblehome hull designs, which slope inward from the waterline, and small-waterplane-area twin hulls (SWATH), which allow for better stability when using a tumblehome hull. These RCS design principles were developed by several navies independently in the 1980s using work done on aircraft RCS reduction as the starting point.

Sea Shadow, which utilizes both tumblehome and SWATH features, was an early US exploration of stealth ship technology. The Zumwalt-class destroyer is a modern example of a stealth ship from the US Navy. Despite being 40% larger than an Arleigh Burke-class destroyer, its radar signature is more akin to a fishing boat and sound levels are comparable to the Los Angeles-class submarine according to a spokesman for Naval Sea Systems Command. The tumblehome hull and composite material deckhouse reduce radar return. Water sleeting along the sides, along with passive cool air induction in the mack, reduces infrared signature. Overall, the destroyer's angular build makes it "50 times harder to spot on radar than an ordinary destroyer", according to Chris Johnson, a spokesman for Naval Sea Systems Command.

The Swedish Navy's Visby-class corvette is designed to elude visual detection, radar detection, acoustic detection, and infrared detection. The hull material is a sandwich construction comprising a PVC core with carbon fiber and vinyl laminate. Avoidance of right angles in the design results in a smaller radar signature, reducing the ship's detection range.

The Royal Navy's Type 45 destroyer has similarities to the Visby class, but is much more conventional, employing traditional steel instead of carbon fiber. Like Visby, its design reduces the use of right angles.

The ROC Navy's Tuo Chiang-class corvette is a class of fast stealth multi-mission corvettes currently in service with the Republic of China (Taiwan) Navy. The ships are designed to have a low radar cross-section and evade radar detection making it difficult to detect the ship when operating closer to the coastline.

== Other forms of signature reduction ==
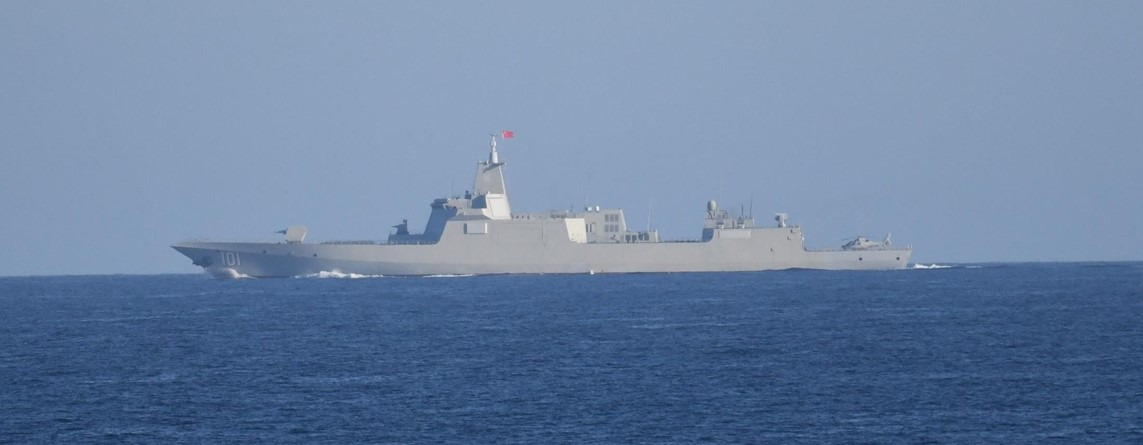
The continuous superstructure of the Type 055 is designed for reduced radar, noise, infrared, and electromagnetic radiation signatures.

Stealth technology represents more than just a low RCS; noise reduction plays a role in naval stealth because sound is conducted better in water than air. Some of the techniques used include muffled exhaust systems, modified propeller shapes, and pump-jets. The shape of the hull can also have a great effect on the reduction of the noise from a ship. Another major element is signal emission control. Modern warships emit much electromagnetic radiation in the form of radar, radio, and bleed-off from the ship's electrical systems. These all can be used to track a ship, and thus modern stealth ships often have a mode that switches off many of the electronic emissions (EMCON), the downside being the ship has to rely on passive sensors and is unable to easily send messages further than the line of sight.

Also of importance are thermal emissions. A heat signature can make a ship stand out in the ocean, making it easier to spot. Because it is possible to see infrared emissions through features that would normally hide a ship such as fog, or a smoke screen, many detection platforms like patrol aircraft, UAVs, and satellites often have the ability to see multiple bands in the infrared spectrum. This necessitates the control of thermal emissions. The most common method is to mix any hot gasses emitted by the main source of heat—the engines' exhaust—with cold air to dilute the signature and make it harder to pick out the ship from the background warmth. Another method vents the exhaust into the water, although this increases the ship's acoustic signature. For the hull, cool water can be actively distributed across the hull of the ship. Another less crucial but still relevant part of a stealth ship is visual camouflage. This area is probably the oldest form of stealth, with records going back almost as far as the writing of ancient mariners using visual tricks to make their ships harder to spot. Although still relevant, this area has taken on lesser importance with the advent of long-range radar.

== Materials ==
Just like choices in shaping, the choice of materials affects the RCS of a ship. Composites like fiberglass and carbon fiber are effective blockers of radar and give smaller vessels an advantage in further RCS reductions. However, composites are fragile and often unsuited to larger ships or ships that expect to take fire, although new laminates can partially negate some of the weaknesses. This restricts larger ships to metals like steel and aluminum alloys. To compensate, a ship may include a coating of a radar-absorbing material, although this can be expensive and may not stand up to the corrosive effects of salt water.

== Examples ==
=== Argentina ===
- ARA Bouchard class

=== Brazil ===
- Tamandaré-class frigate – Brazilian frigate class

=== Chile / Colombia ===
- OPV-80-class offshore patrol vessel – Offshore patrol vessels operated by the Chilean and Colombian Navies

=== China ===
- Type 22 missile boat – Ship class in the Chinese People's Liberation Army Navy
- Type 052C destroyer – Class of guided missile destroyers in the Chinese People's Liberation Army Navy
- Type 052D destroyer – Class of guided missile destroyers in the Chinese People's Liberation Army Navy
- Type 054A frigate – Class of Chinese guided-missile frigates
- Type 055 destroyer – Chinese guided-missile stealth cruiser/destroyer class
- Type 056 corvette – Class of Chinese light frigates
- Type 071 amphibious transport dock – Class of ship in service with the Chinese People's Liberation Army Navy
- Type 075 landing helicopter dock – Class of Chinese landing helicopter docks
- Type 076 landing helicopter dock – Class of Chinese landing helicopter docks
- Type 002 aircraft carrier – 1 ship class of Chinese aircraft carriers
- Type 003 aircraft carrier – 1 ship class of Chinese supercarriers

=== Denmark ===
- Absalon-class frigate – Danish multipurpose frigate
- Iver Huitfeldt-class frigate – Air defence frigates of the Danish Navy

=== Egypt ===
- Ambassador MK III missile boat – Small warship class of the Egyptian Navy

=== Finland ===
- Hamina-class missile boat – Fast attack craft class of the Finnish Navy

=== France ===
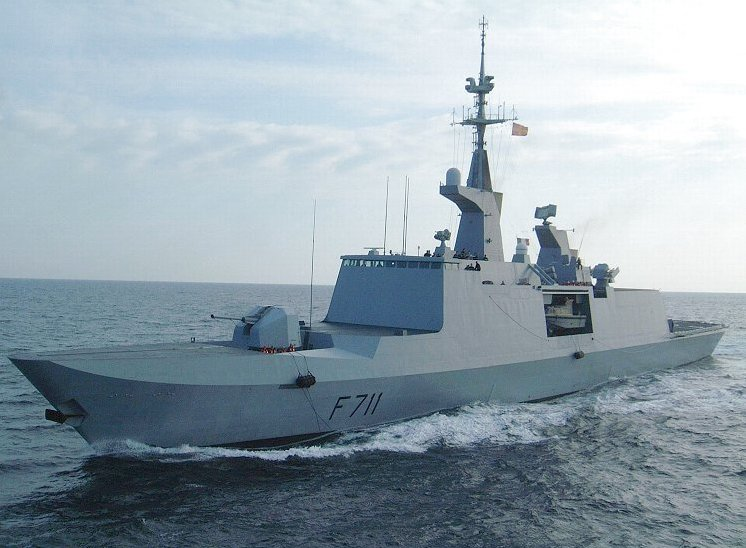
French frigate Surcouf of the La Fayette class

- La Fayette-class frigate – French general purpose stealth frigates
- Gowind-class design – French multi-role ship design
- Horizon-class frigate – Class of air-defence destroyers
- Admiral Ronarc'h-class frigate – French class of general purpose frigates
- France Libre-class aircraft carrier – Planned class of French supercarriers

=== Germany ===
- Baden-Württemberg-class frigate – Series of frigates of the German Navy
- Sachsen-class frigate – German air-defense frigates
- Braunschweig-class corvette – Stealth warship class of the German Navy
- F126 frigate – Planned class of German Navy frigates

=== India ===
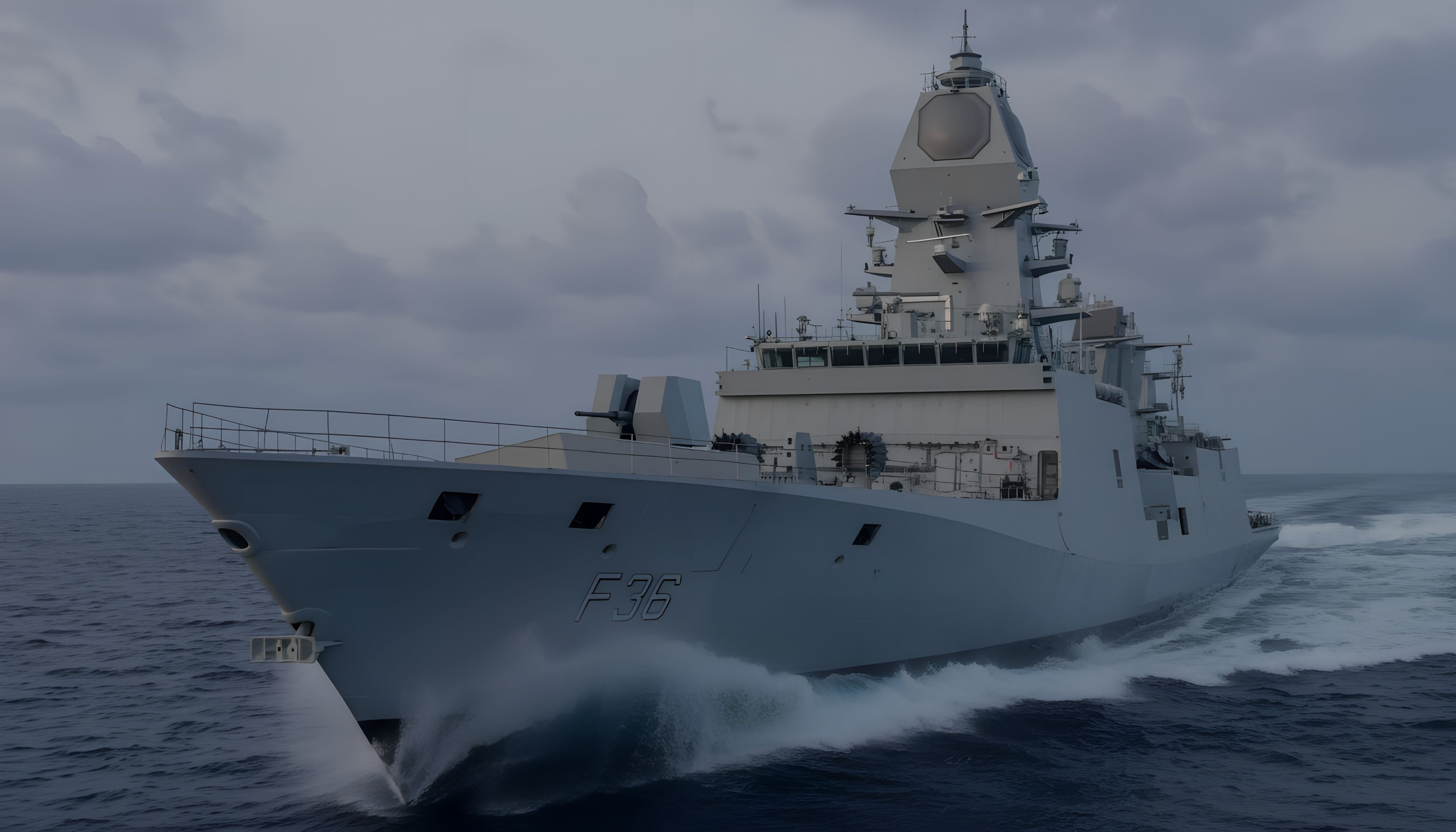
INS Dunagiri of the Nilgiri class frigates

- Anti-Submarine Warfare Shallow Water Craft – Class of ships of the Indian Navy
- Kamorta-class corvette – Indian anti-submarine warship class
- Visakhapatnam-class destroyer – Class of stealth guided missile destroyers
- Kolkata-class destroyer – Class of guided-missile destroyers
- Shivalik-class frigate – Class of Indian stealth frigates
- Nilgiri-class frigate – Indian stealth guided-missile frigates
- Project 18-class destroyer – Indian stealth guided missile destroyers

=== Indonesia ===
- Klewang-class fast attack craft – Stealth trimaran fast attack craft of Indonesian Navy
- Martadinata-class frigate – Frigate class of the Indonesian Navy
- Brawijaya-class frigate — Frigate class of the Indonesian Navy (Former Italian Thaon di Revel-class)
- Balaputradewa-class frigate — Frigate class of the Indonesian Navy
- Diponegoro-class corvette — Corvette class of the Indonesian Navy
- Raja Haji Fisabilillah-class — Patrol vessel of the Indonesian Navy

=== Italy ===
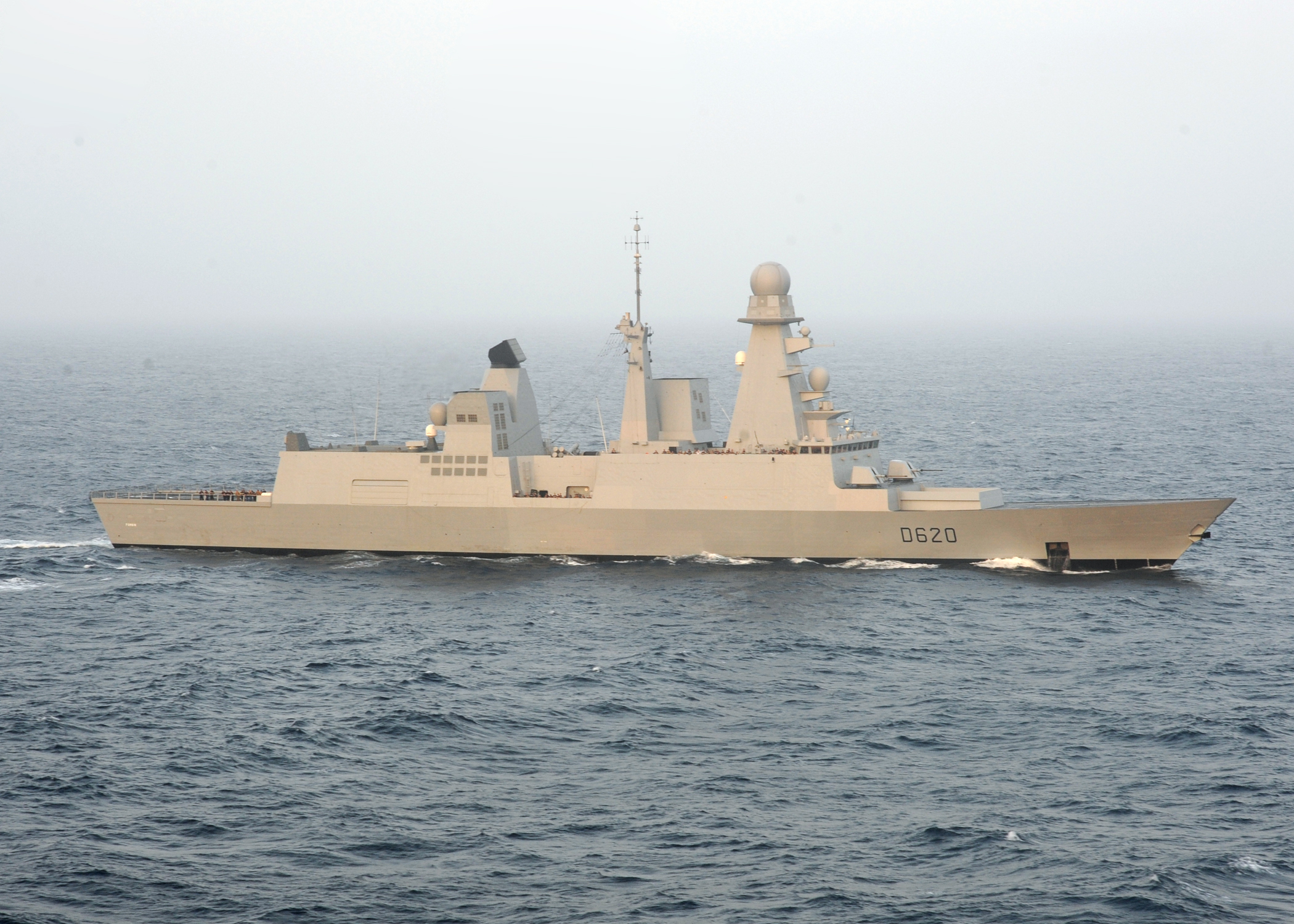
Horizon-class frigate of the French Navy and Italian Navy

- FREMM multipurpose frigate – Class of multi-purpose frigates
- Horizon-class frigate – Class of air-defence destroyers

=== Japan ===
- Mogami-class frigate – Class of Japanese stealth frigates
- Maya-class destroyer – Guided-missile destroyer class in the Japanese Maritime Self-Defense Forces
- Atago-class destroyer – Guided-missile destroyer class in the Japanese Maritime Self-Defense Forces
- Kongō-class destroyer – Guided-missile destroyer class in the Japanese Maritime Self-Defense Forces
- Aegis system equipped vessels (ASEV) – Class of Japanese cruisers under construction for the Japanese Maritime Self-Defense Force

=== Malaysia ===
- Kedah-class offshore patrol vessel – Ship class of the Royal Malaysian Navy

=== Mexico ===
- Durango-class patrol vessel – Offshore patrol vessel class in the Mexican Navy
- Sierra-class corvette – Corvettes of the Mexican Navy
- Oaxaca-class patrol vessel – Mexican navy patrol vessel

=== Myanmar ===
- Inlay-class offshore patrol vessel – Ship class of the Myanmar Navy
- Kyan Sittha-class frigate – Myanmar Stealth Frigate
- Anawrahta-class corvette – Warships operated by the Myanmar Navy
- Yan Nyein Aung-class submarine chaser – Stealth submarine chaser class of the Myanmar Navy

=== Netherlands ===
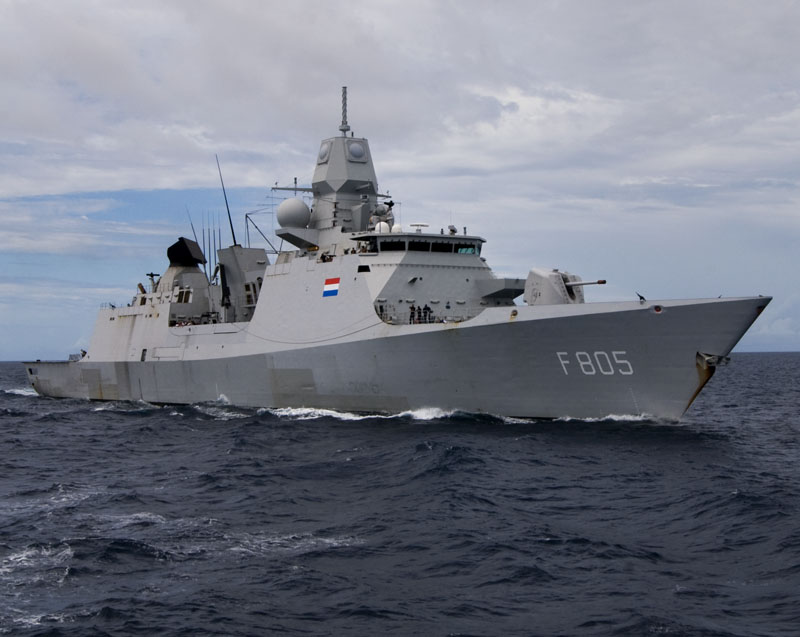
Dutch frigate Evertsen of the De Zeven Provinciën class

- De Zeven Provinciën-class frigate – Dutch air-defence and command frigates
- Holland-class offshore patrol vessel – Four ocean-going patrol vessels constructed for the Royal Netherlands Navy
- Sigma-class corvette – Dutch-built family of modular naval vessels, of corvette or frigate size
- HNLMS Rotterdam (L800) – Landing Platform Dock
- Anti-Submarine Warfare Frigate (Royal Netherlands Navy) – Project to replace existing navy frigates

=== North Korea ===
- Nongo-class warship – Medium-size warships built by North Korea
- Choe Hyon-class destroyer – Class of North Korean guided-missile destroyers

=== Norway ===
- Skjold-class corvette – Light, fast, stealth missile corvettes of the Royal Norwegian Navy
- Fridtjof Nansen-class frigate – Class of ships of the Royal Norwegian Navy

=== Philippines ===
- Jose Rizal-class frigate – Philippine Navy Frigate
- Miguel Malvar-class frigate – Guided missile frigates in service with the Philippines Navy
- Rajah Sulayman-class offshore patrol vessel – Class of warships
- Tarlac-class landing platform dock – Philippine Navy amphibious transport ship

=== Russia ===
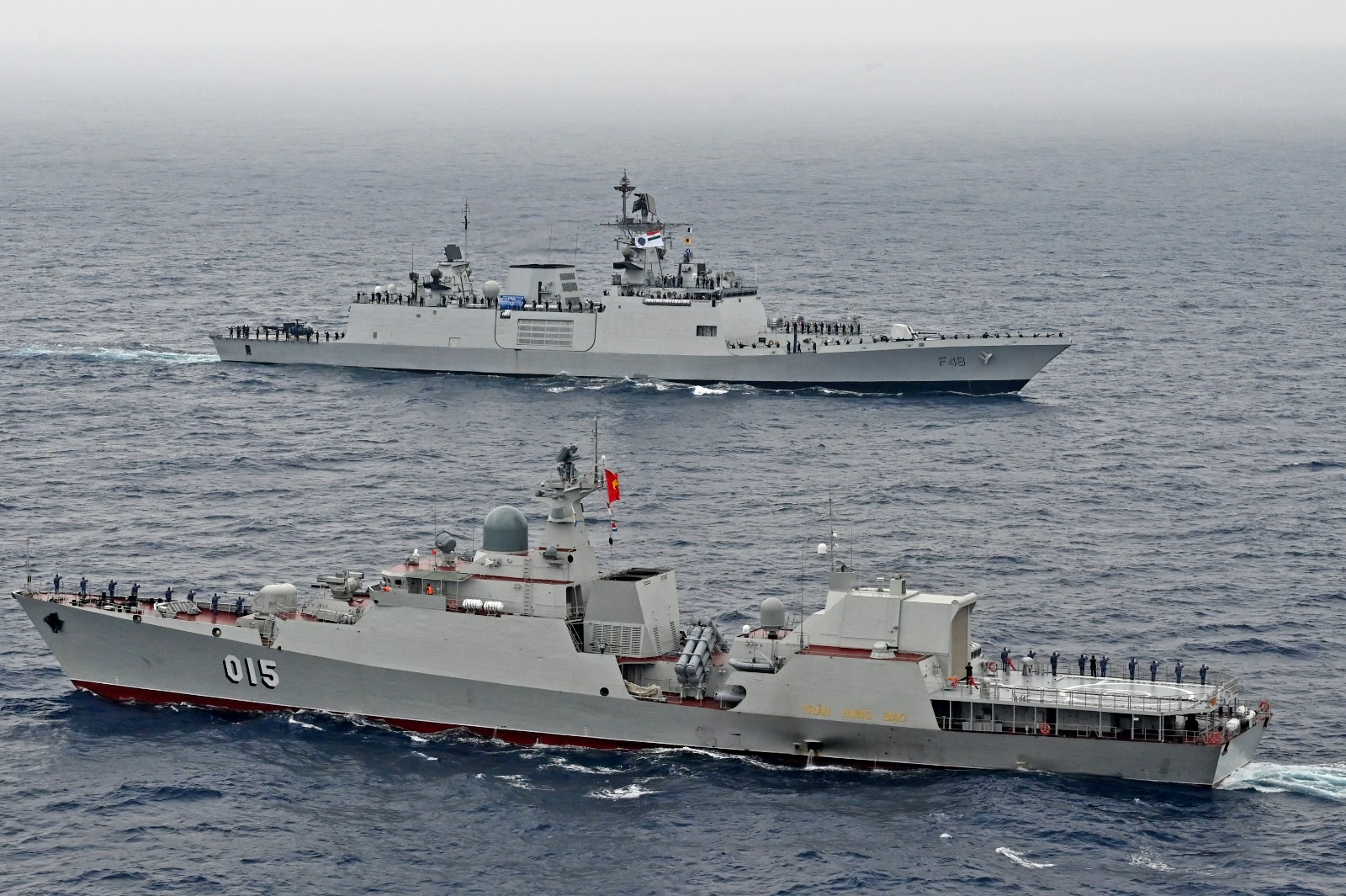
Gepard-class frigate and Shivalik-class frigate

- Admiral Gorshkov-class frigate – Stealth ships of the Russian navy
- Gepard-class frigate – Russian-built warships
- Buyan-class corvette – Russian series of small artillery ships (minimal stealth)
- Buyan-M-class corvette – Russian series of small missile ships (imporoved stealth variant)
- Steregushchiy-class corvette – Class of corvettes of the Russian Navy
- Gremyashchiy-class corvette – Class of Russian warships
- Neustrashimy-class frigate – 1986 class of Russian frigates
- Admiral Grigorovich-class frigate – Russian class of frigates
- Lider-class destroyer – Russian nuclear-powered destroyer

=== Singapore ===
- Formidable-class frigate – Frigate class of the Republic of Singapore Navy

=== South Africa ===
- Valour-class frigate – South African navy frigates

=== South Korea ===
- Sejong the Great-class destroyer – Class of South Korean destroyers
- Chungmugong Yi Sun-sin-class destroyer – Class of South Korean destroyers
- Yoon Youngha-class patrol vessel – Ship class of the Republic of Korea Navy
- KDDX-class destroyer – Stealthy destroyer class under development by Hyundai Heavy Industries for ROK Navy,

=== Spain ===
- Álvaro de Bazán-class frigate – Class of Spanish air defence frigates
- F110-class frigate – Class of Spanish Navy frigates

=== Sweden ===
- Visby-class corvette – Swedish stealth missile corvettes

=== Taiwan ===
- Tuo Chiang-class corvette – Taiwanese class of war vessel
- Kang Ding-class frigate – Taiwanese class of frigate

=== Thailand ===
- Bhumibol Adulyadej-class frigate – Thai class of frigates

=== Turkey ===
- Ada-class corvette – Turkish anti-submarine ships
- TF-2000-class destroyer – Turkish anti-air warfare destroyer under development

=== United Kingdom ===
- Type 45 destroyer – 2009 Royal Navy destroyer class
- Queen Elizabeth-class aircraft carrier – Royal Navy aircraft carrier class
- Type 26 frigate – Frigate class being built for the Royal Navy
- Type 31 frigate – Future frigate of the Royal Navy

=== United States ===
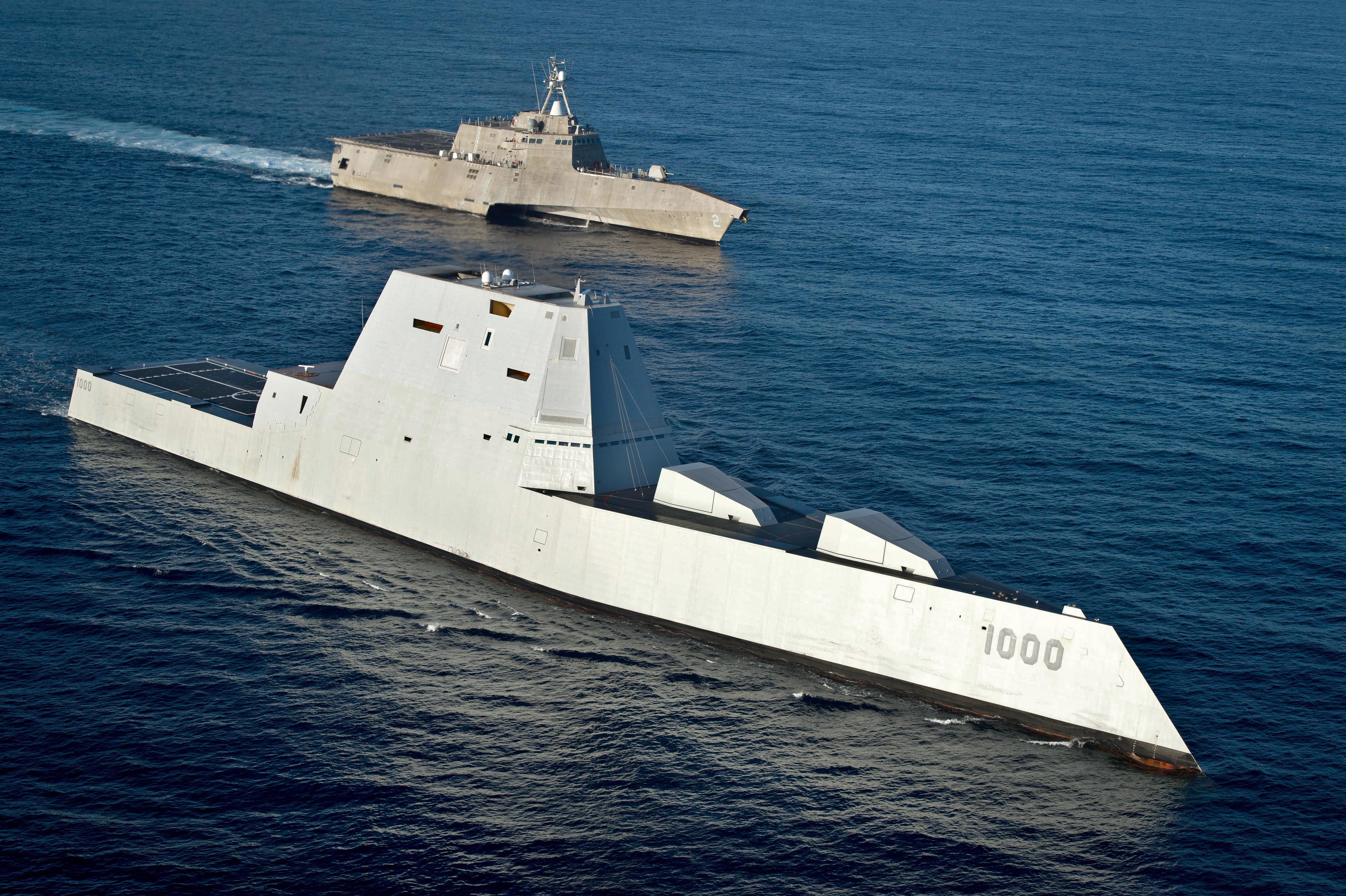
USS Zumwalt of the Zumwalt-class

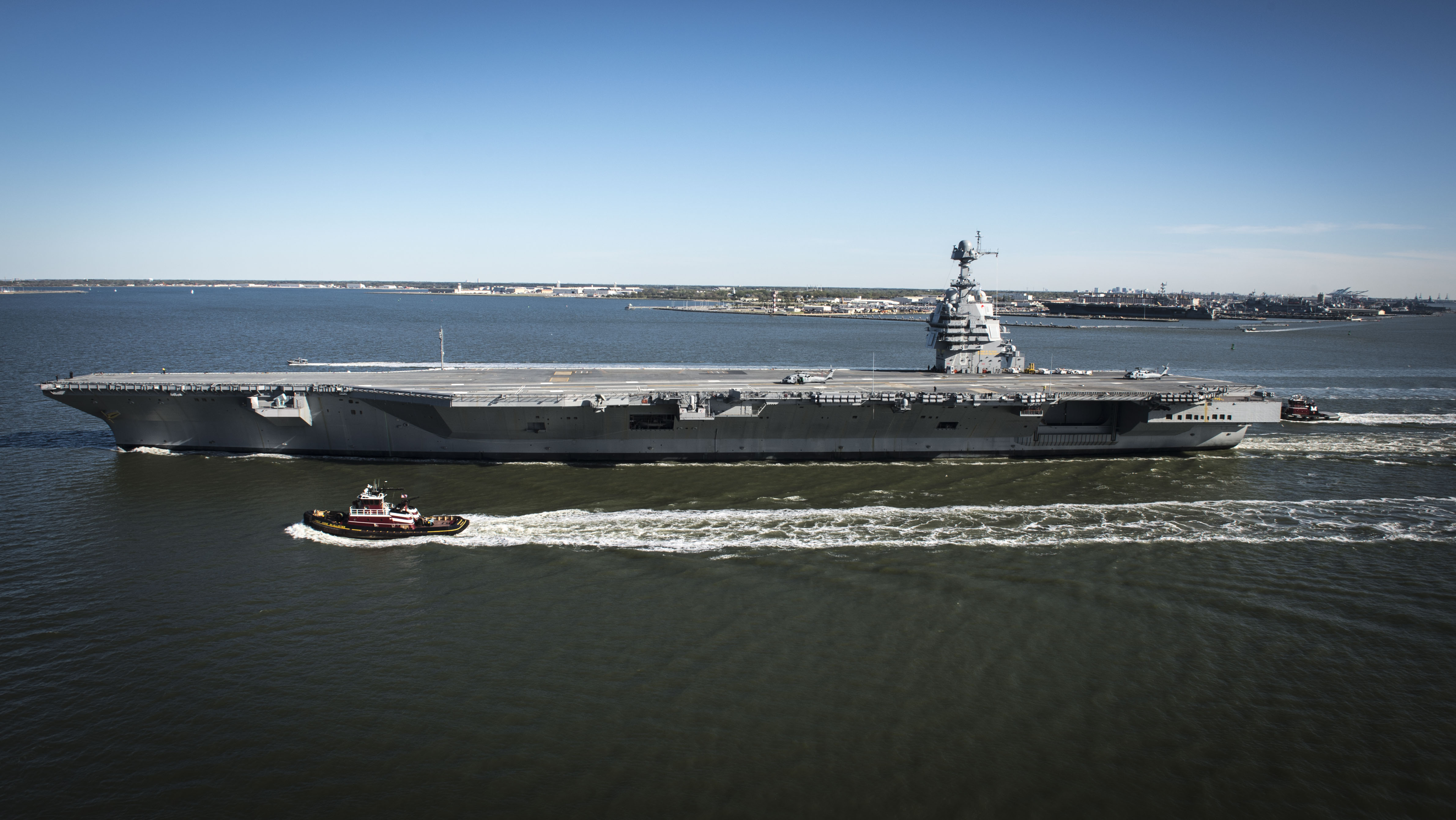
USS Gerald R. Ford of the Gerald R. Ford-class

- Sea Shadow (IX-529) – American experimental stealth ship
- Independence-class littoral combat ship – US Navy small coastal combat ships
- Freedom-class littoral combat ship – U.S. Navy small coastal combat ships
- Zumwalt-class destroyer – Stealth missile destroyer class of the US Navy
- Legend-class cutter – United States Coast Guard cutter class
- Gerald R. Ford-class aircraft carrier – Class of supercarriers for the U.S. Navy
- San Antonio-class amphibious transport dock – Warship class of the US Navy
- McClung-class – U.S. Navy program to develop a class of medium landing ships
- Arleigh Burke-class destroyer – US Navy guided-missile destroyer class
- Trump-class battleship – U.S. Navy program to develop a class of large surface combatants
- DDG(X) – U.S. Navy program to develop a class of principal surface combatants
- FF(X) – U.S. Navy program to develop a class of surface warfare frigates
- Constellation-class – U.S. Navy program to develop a class of guided-missile frigates

=== Vietnam ===
- BPS-500 missile boat
