= Research vessel =

Ship or boat designed, modified, or equipped to carry out research at sea

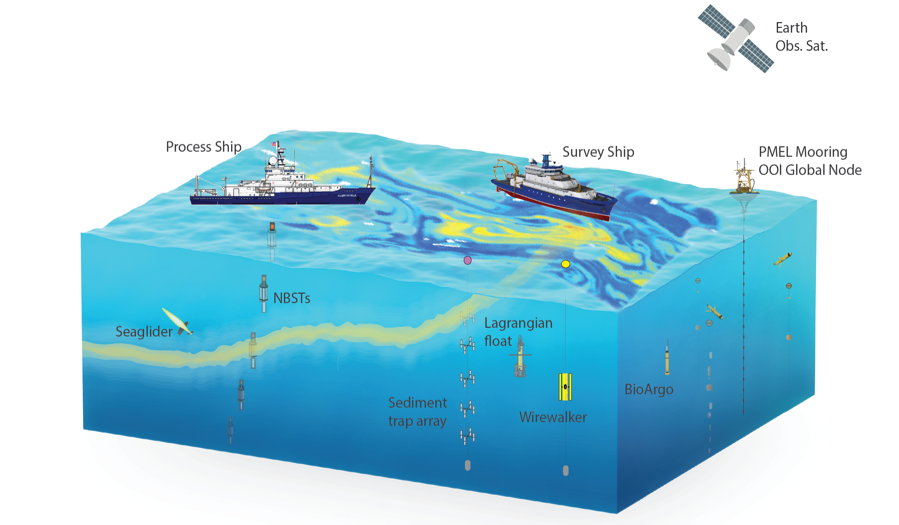
Examples of remote sensing equipment deployed by or interfacing with oceanographic research vessels.

A research vessel (RV or R/V) is a ship or boat designed, modified, or equipped to carry out research at sea. Research vessels carry out a number of roles which can be combined into a single vessel but others require a dedicated vessel. Due to the demanding nature of the work, research vessels may be constructed around an icebreaker hull, allowing them to operate in polar waters.

== History ==
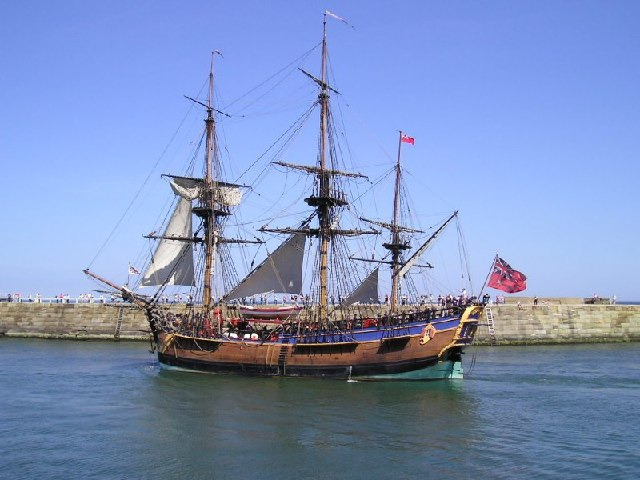
Endeavour replica in 2000

The research ship had origins in the early voyages of exploration. By the time of James Cook's Endeavour, the essentials of what today we would call a research ship are clearly apparent. In 1766, the Royal Society hired Cook to travel to the Pacific Ocean to observe and record the transit of Venus across the Sun. The Endeavour was a sturdy vessel, well designed and equipped for the ordeals she would face, and fitted out with facilities for her "research personnel", Joseph Banks. As is common with contemporary research vessels, Endeavour also carried out more than one kind of research, including comprehensive hydrographic survey work.

Some other notable early research vessels were HMS Beagle, HMS Challenger, USFC Albatross, Endurance, Terra Nova, and RV Calypso. The names of early research vessels have been used to name later research vessels, as well as Space Shuttles.

== Modern types ==
Examples of modern
research vessel types

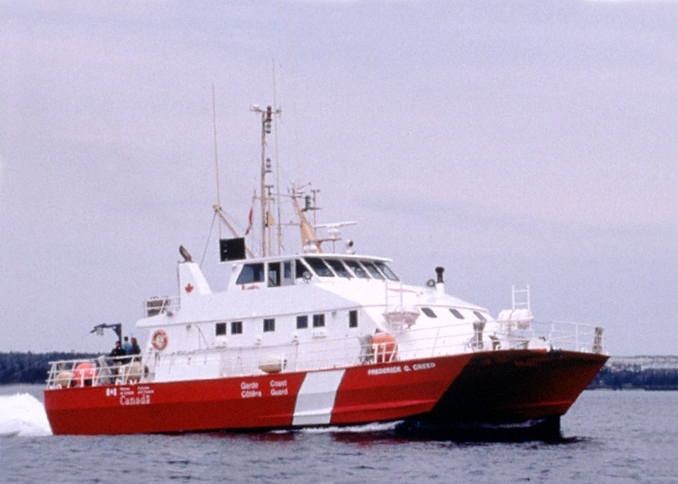
Canadian hydrographic survey vessel CCGS Frederick G. Creed

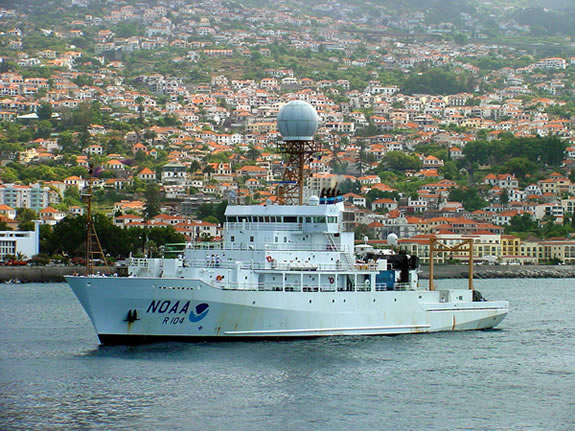
United States oceanographic research vessel, NOAAS Ronald H. Brown

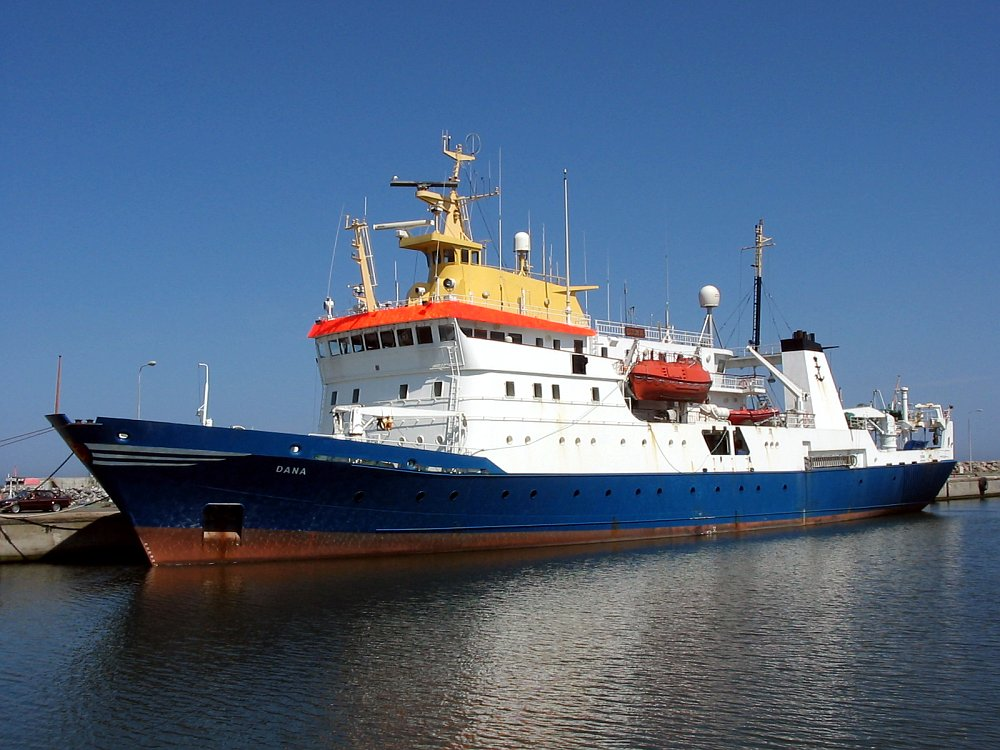
Danish fisheries research vessel, FRV Dana

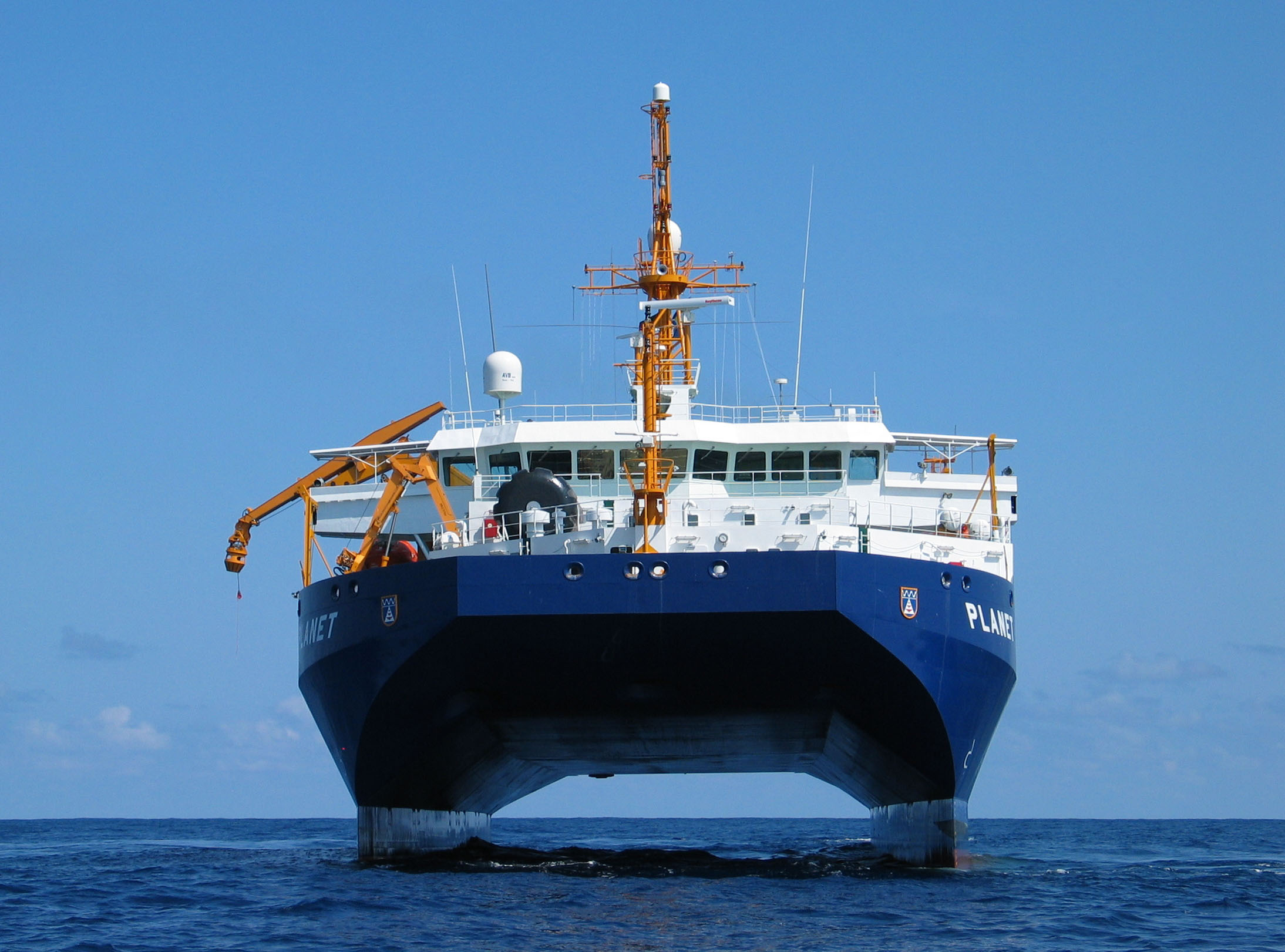
German naval research vessel Planet

=== Hydrographic survey ===
A hydrographic survey ship is a vessel designed to conduct hydrographic research and survey. Nautical charts are produced from this information to ensure safe navigation by military and civilian shipping. Hydrographic survey vessels also conduct seismic surveys of the seabed and the underlying geology. Apart from producing the charts, this information is useful for detecting geological features likely to bear oil or gas. These vessels usually mount equipment on a towed structure, for example, air cannons used to generate shock waves that sound strata beneath the seabed, or mounted on the keel, for example, a depth sounder. In practice, hydrographic survey vessels are often equipped to perform multiple roles. Some function also as oceanographic research ships. Naval hydrographic survey vessels often do naval research, for example, on submarine detection.

An example of a hydrographic survey vessel is CCGS Frederick G. Creed. For an example of the employment of a survey ship see HMS Hydra.

=== Oceanographic research ===
Oceanographic research vessels carry out research on the physical, chemical, and biological characteristics of water, the atmosphere, and climate, and to these ends carry equipment for collecting water samples from a range of depths, including the deep seas, as well as equipment for the hydrographic sounding of the seabed, along with numerous other environmental sensors. These vessels often also carry scientific divers and unmanned underwater vehicles. Since the requirements of both oceanographic and hydrographic research are very different from those of fisheries research, these boats often fulfill dual roles. Recent oceanographic research campaigns include GEOTRACES and NAAMES.

Examples of an oceanographic research vessel include the NOAAS Ronald H. Brown and the Chilean Navy Cabo de Hornos.

=== Fisheries research ===
A fisheries research vessel requires platforms capable of towing different types of fishing nets, collecting plankton or water samples from a range of depths, and carrying acoustic fish-finding equipment. Fisheries research vessels are often designed and built along the same lines as a large fishing vessel, but with space given over to laboratories and equipment storage, as opposed to storage of the catch.

An example of a fisheries research vessel is FRV Scotia.

=== Naval research ===
Naval research vessels investigate naval concerns, such as submarine and mine detection or sonar and weapons trials.

An example of a naval research vessel is the Planet of the German Navy.

=== Polar research ===
Polar research vessels are constructed around an icebreaker hull, allowing them to engage in ice navigation and operate in polar waters. These vessels usually have dual roles, particularly in the Antarctic, where they function also as polar replenishment and supply vessels to the Antarctic research bases.

Examples of polar research vessels include USCGC Polar Star, RSV Aurora Australis, and RSV Nuyina.

=== Oil exploration ===
Oil exploration is performed in a number of ways, one of the most common being mobile drilling platforms or ships that are moved from area to area as needed to drill into the seabed to find out what deposits lie beneath it.

== See also ==
- European and American voyages of scientific exploration
- Marine research vessels
- Technical research ship
- Weather ship
