= List of equipment in the Myanmar Navy =

Myanmar Navy
- Burmese: တပ်မတော်ရေ
- Ensign of the Myanmar Navy
- Country: Myanmar
- Role: Naval warfare

The Myanmar Navy (Burmese: တပ်မတော် (ရေ)) is the naval warfare branch of the Tatmadaw, the armed forces of Myanmar. With 30,000 active personnel, the navy operates more than 227 vessels. Prior to 1988, the navy was small, and its role in counter-insurgency operations was smaller than those of the army and the air force. The navy has since been expanded to take on a more active role in defense of Myanmar's territorial waters. The following is a list of equipment in the Republic of Union of Myanmar Navy. It may not be up-to-date or complete.

== Submarines ==
Class	Photo	Builder	Serial number	Year entered service	Armament	Home Port	Note
Kilo class		Rubin Design Bureau Soviet Union	UMS Min Ye Theinkhathu (71)	24 December 2020	18 torpedoes for –; 53-65KE torpedoes; TEST-71MKE TV guide electric homing torpedoes; 24 × DM-1 naval mines; 9M36 Strela-3 (SA-N-8) MANPAD	No.(71) Submarine Base (Ownchein Island).	Ex-INS Sindhuvir, refitted at Hindustan Shipyard. The refitted Sindhuvir has been fitted with certain Indian systems. Transferred to Myanmar Navy in 2020.
Type 035B Ming class		Wuchang Shipyard China	UMS Min Ye Kyaw Htin (72)	24 December 2021	14 torpedoes or cruise missiles in the lieu of torpedo tubes; 28–32 naval mines	No.(71) Submarine Base (Ownchein Island).	Former People's Liberation Army Navy Type 035B submarine. Transferred to Myanmar Navy in 2021.
Midget submarine			Unknown			Thanlyin Naval Shipyard	37-metre (121 ft 5 in)-long midget submarine found near the Thanlyin Navy Shipyard.

== Active ships ==
=== Landing platform dock (LPD) ===
Class	Photo	Builder	Serial number	Year entered service	Armament	Note
Makassar class		Dae Sun Shipbuilding (South Korea)	UMS Moattama (1501)	24 December 2019	2 × 14.5 mm Gatling guns; 2 × QJG-02G 14.5 mm heavy machine guns	Used as a multi-purpose support vessel and current fleet flagship

=== Frigates ===
Class	Photo	Builder	Serial number	Commissioned	Armament	Note
Thalun-class		Thanlyin Naval Dockyard Myanmar	19 (UMS KING THALUN)	March 8, 2026	1 × Oto Melara 76 mm naval gun 16 VLS cells for anti-aircraft missile 3–4 x 30 mm CIWS 2 x 14.5 mm DI RCWS 8 x unknown anti-ship missile 2 x triple torpedo launchers for Shyena torpedoes 2 x RBU-6000 anti-submarine rocket launchers 2 x Large Depth Charge (LDC) throwers 2 x M2 Browning Heavy Machine Guns	New designs with improvements, Launched on Dec 24,2024.
Aung Zeya class		Naval Dockyard (Myanmar)	F11 (UMS Aung Zeya)	2010	1 × OTO Melara 76 mm naval gun (mounted in stealth cupola); 4 × AK-630 CIWS; 2 × 14.5 mm Gatling guns; 8 × Kumsong-3 anti-ship missiles; 6 × SA-N-5 SAM (reloadable); 1 × Tri-tubes torpedo launchers for YU-7 torpedoes; 2 × Large Depth Charge (LDC) throwers; 2 × Type 81 anti-submarine (ASW) rocket launchers (36 rockets in storage); 2 × M2 Browning heavy machine guns	Launched in 2008 and commissioned in late 2010.
Kyan Sittha class		Naval Dockyard (Myanmar)	F12 (UMS Kyansitta)	31 March 2014	1 × OTO Melara 76 mm naval gun (mounted in stealth cupola); 3 × NG-18 CIWS; 2 × 14.5 mm Gatling guns; 8 × C-802 anti-ship missiles; 6 × turret-mounted Igla SAM (reloadable); 2 × triple tubes torpedo launchers for Shyena torpedoes; 2 × Type 81 anti-submarine rocket launchers (36 rockets in storage); 2 × Large Depth Charge (LDC) throwers; 2 × M2 Browning heavy machine guns	Radar cross-section reduction design.
Kyan Sittha class		Naval Dockyard (Myanmar)	F14 (UMS Sin Phyu Shin)	24 December 2015	1 × OTO Melara 76 mm naval gun (mounted in stealth cupola); 3 × NG-18 CIWS; 2 × 14.5 mm Gatling guns; 8 × C-802 anti-ship missiles; 6 × turret-mounted Igla SAM (reloadable); 2 × triple tubes torpedo launchers for Shyena torpedoes; 2 × Type 81 anti-submarine rocket launchers (36 rockets in storage); 2 × Large Depth Charge (LDC) throwers; 2 × M2 Browning heavy machine guns	Radar cross-section reduction design.
Type 053H1 (Jianghu-II) class		Hudong Shipyard (People's Republic of China)	F22 (UMS Mahar Bandoola)	30 April 2012	2 × Type 79A 100 mm naval gun; 4 × dual 37 mm anti-aircraft (AA) guns; 8 × C-802 anti-ship missiles; 2 × RBU-3200 6-tube anti-submarine rocket launchers (36 rockets in storage); 2 × Type 62 5-tube ASW mortar launchers; 2 × depth charge (DC) racks & projectors	Ex Anshun (FFG 554) and Jishou (FFG 557) were transferred to the Myanmar Navy on 9 March 2012. The hull number of UMS Mahar Bandoola was changed into F-22 in 2016.
Type 053H1 (Jianghu-II) class		Hudong Shipyard (People's Republic of China)	F23 (UMS Mahar Thiha Thura)	30 April 2012	2 × Type 79A 100 mm naval gun; 4 × dual 37 mm anti-aircraft (AA) guns; 8 × C-802 anti-ship missiles; 2 × RBU-3200 6-tube anti-submarine rocket launchers (36 rockets in storage); 2 × Type 62 5-tube ASW mortar launchers; 2 × depth charge (DC) racks & projectors	Ex Anshun (FFG 554) and Jishou (FFG 557) were transferred to the Myanmar Navy on 9 March 2012. The hull number of UMS Mahar Bandoola was changed into F-22 in 2016.

=== Corvettes ===
Class	Photo	Builder	Serial number	Commissioned	Armament	Note
Anawrahta class		Naval Dockyard (Myanmar)	771 (UMS Anawratha)	2001	1 × OTO Melara 76 mm naval gun; 1 × AK-230 twin-barrel 30 mm CIWS gun; 2 × Type 58/ZPU-2 AA guns; 6 × SA-N-5 SAM (reloadable); 4 × C-802 anti-ship missiles; 2 × Type 81 ASW rocket launchers; 2 × Large Depth Charge (LDC) throwers; 2 × 14.5 mm QJG-02G AA guns	UMS Tabinshwehti was the latest design of the class and featured radar cross-section reduction. Launched in 2014 and commissioned on 24 December 2016.
Anawrahta class		Naval Dockyard (Myanmar)	772 (UMS Bayintnaung)	2003	1 × OTO Melara 76 mm naval gun; 1 × AK-230 twin-barrel 30 mm CIWS gun; 2 × Type 58/ZPU-2 AA guns; 6 × SA-N-5 SAM (reloadable); 4 × C-802 anti-ship missiles; 2 × Type 81 ASW rocket launchers; 2 × Large Depth Charge (LDC) throwers; 2 × 14.5 mm QJG-02G AA guns	UMS Tabinshwehti was the latest design of the class and featured radar cross-section reduction. Launched in 2014 and commissioned on 24 December 2016.
Anawrahta class		Naval Dockyard (Myanmar)	773 (UMS Tabinshwehti)	24 December 2016	1 × OTO Melara 76 mm naval gun (fitted in the stealth cupola); 2 × NG-18 30 mm CIWS; 2 × 14.5 mm Gatling guns; 4 × C-802 anti-ship missiles; 6 × SA-N-5 SAM (reloadable); 2 × tri-tubes torpedo launchers for Shyena torpedoes; 2 × Type 81 ASW rocket launchers; 2 × Large Depth Charge (LDC) throwers; 2 × M2 Browning heavy machine guns	UMS Tabinshwehti was the latest design of the class and featured radar cross-section reduction. Launched in 2014 and commissioned on 24 December 2016.

=== Fast attack craft (Missile) ===
Class	Photo	Builder	Serial number	Commissioned	Armament	Note
49m Stealth		Naval Dockyard (Myanmar)	491	24 December 2015	1 × NG-18 6-barrel 30 mm CIWS guns; 2 × Type 91 quadruple remote-controlled AA guns; 4 × C-802 anti-ship missiles (For 491); 4 × C-802A anti-ship missiles (For 492); 2 × Igla SAM launchers; 2 × MA-16 heavy machine guns	Launched in 2013 and commissioned on 24 December 2015.
49m Stealth		Naval Dockyard (Myanmar)	492	24 December 2020	1 × NG-18 6-barrel 30 mm CIWS guns; 2 × Type 91 quadruple remote-controlled AA guns; 4 × C-802 anti-ship missiles (For 491); 4 × C-802A anti-ship missiles (For 492); 2 × Igla SAM launchers; 2 × MA-16 heavy machine guns	Commissioned on 24 December 2020. A smaller boat than 491 and the anti-ship missiles are C-802A instead of C-802.
5-Series class		Naval Dockyard (Myanmar)	556	2004	2 × NG-18 30 mm CIWS; 2 × 14.5 mm locally made Type 91 quad AA guns; 4 × C-802 anti-ship missiles; 1 × Gibka launcher for 4 × SA-N-5 Igla SAMs (fitted behind the ship's mast)	The main guns were substituted with NG-18 around 2016.
5-Series class		Naval Dockyard (Myanmar)	557	2004	2 × NG-18 30 mm CIWS; 2 × 14.5 mm locally made Type 91 quad AA guns; 4 × C-802 anti-ship missiles; 1 × Gibka launcher for 4 × SA-N-5 Igla SAMs (fitted behind the ship's mast)	The main guns were substituted with NG-18 around 2016.
5-Series class		Naval Dockyard (Myanmar)	558	2004	2 × NG-18 30 mm CIWS; 2 × 14.5 mm locally made Type 91 quad AA guns; 4 × C-802 anti-ship missiles; 1 × Gibka launcher for 4 × SA-N-5 Igla SAMs (fitted behind the ship's mast)	The main guns were substituted with NG-18 around 2016.
5-Series class		Naval Dockyard (Myanmar)	561	2008	1 × NG-18 30 mm CIWS; 2 × 14.5 mm locally made Type 91 quad AA guns; 2 × C-802 anti-ship missiles; 1 × Gibka launcher for 4 × SA-N-5 Igla SAM (fitted behind the ship's mast.)	The main guns were substituted with NG-18 around 2016.
5-Series class		Naval Dockyard (Myanmar)	562	2008	1 × NG-18 30 mm CIWS; 2 × 14.5 mm locally made Type 91 quad AA guns; 2 × C-802 anti-ship missiles; 1 × Gibka launcher for 4 × SA-N-5 Igla SAM (fitted behind the ship's mast.)	The main guns were substituted with NG-18 around 2016.
Houxin class		Qiuxin Shipyards, Shanghai, (China)	471 (MarGa)	16 December 1995	2 × Type 76A twin 37 mm naval gun; 2 × Type 69 14.5 mm twin AA guns; 1 × Gibka launcher for 4 × SA-N-5 Igla SAM (fitted behind the ship's mast.); 4 × C-802 anti-ship missiles	
Houxin class		Qiuxin Shipyards, Shanghai, (China)	472 (SaitTra)	16 December 1995	2 × Type 76A twin 37 mm naval gun; 2 × Type 69 14.5 mm twin AA guns; 1 × Gibka launcher for 4 × SA-N-5 Igla SAM (fitted behind the ship's mast.); 4 × C-802 anti-ship missiles	
Houxin class		Qiuxin Shipyards, Shanghai, (China)	473 (DuWan)	11 November 1996	2 × Type 76A twin 37 mm naval gun; 2 × Type 69 14.5 mm twin AA guns; 1 × Gibka launcher for 4 × SA-N-5 Igla SAM (fitted behind the ship's mast.); 4 × C-802 anti-ship missiles	
Houxin class		Qiuxin Shipyards, Shanghai, (China)	474 (ZeyHta)	11 November 1996	2 × Type 76A twin 37 mm naval gun; 2 × Type 69 14.5 mm twin AA guns; 1 × Gibka launcher for 4 × SA-N-5 Igla SAM (fitted behind the ship's mast.); 4 × C-802 anti-ship missiles	
Houxin class		Qiuxin Shipyards, Shanghai, (China)	475 (HanTha)	30 June 1997	2 × Type 76A twin 37 mm naval gun; 2 × Type 69 14.5 mm twin AA guns; 1 × Gibka launcher for 4 × SA-N-5 Igla SAM (fitted behind the ship's mast.); 4 × C-802 anti-ship missiles	
Houxin class		Qiuxin Shipyards, Shanghai, (China)	476 (BanTha)	30 June 1997	2 × Type 76A twin 37 mm naval gun; 2 × Type 69 14.5 mm twin AA guns; 1 × Gibka launcher for 4 × SA-N-5 Igla SAM (fitted behind the ship's mast.); 4 × C-802 anti-ship missiles	

=== Fast attack craft (Gun) ===
Class	Photo	Builder	Serial number	Year entered service	Armament	Note
5-Series class		Naval Dockyard (Myanmar)	551	1996	2 × Type 66 twin 57 mm guns (for hulls 551 and 552); 2 × Type 76A twin 37 mm gun (for hulls 553, 554 and 555); 1 × 2M-3M 25 mm twin gun; 2 × ZPU-1 14.5 mm guns	
5-Series class		Naval Dockyard (Myanmar)	552	1996	2 × Type 66 twin 57 mm guns (for hulls 551 and 552); 2 × Type 76A twin 37 mm gun (for hulls 553, 554 and 555); 1 × 2M-3M 25 mm twin gun; 2 × ZPU-1 14.5 mm guns	
5-Series class		Naval Dockyard (Myanmar)	553	1996	2 × Type 66 twin 57 mm guns (for hulls 551 and 552); 2 × Type 76A twin 37 mm gun (for hulls 553, 554 and 555); 1 × 2M-3M 25 mm twin gun; 2 × ZPU-1 14.5 mm guns	
5-Series class		Naval Dockyard (Myanmar)	554	1996	2 × Type 66 twin 57 mm guns (for hulls 551 and 552); 2 × Type 76A twin 37 mm gun (for hulls 553, 554 and 555); 1 × 2M-3M 25 mm twin gun; 2 × ZPU-1 14.5 mm guns	
5-Series class		Naval Dockyard (Myanmar)	555	1996	2 × Type 66 twin 57 mm guns (for hulls 551 and 552); 2 × Type 76A twin 37 mm gun (for hulls 553, 554 and 555); 1 × 2M-3M 25 mm twin gun; 2 × ZPU-1 14.5 mm guns	
5-Series class		Naval Dockyard (Myanmar)	559	2004	2 × CRN-91 30 mm single guns (or Medak gun) from India (for 559 and 560); 1 × 2M-3M 25 mm twin gun; 2 × ZPU-1 14.5 mm guns	
5-Series class		Naval Dockyard (Myanmar)	560	2004	2 × CRN-91 30 mm single guns (or Medak gun) from India (for 559 and 560); 1 × 2M-3M 25 mm twin gun; 2 × ZPU-1 14.5 mm guns	
5-Series class		Naval Dockyard (Myanmar)	563	2013	1 × 40 mm locally made single gun; 2 × ZPU-1 14.5 mm guns	
5-Series class		Naval Dockyard (Myanmar)	564	2013	1 × 40 mm locally made single gun; 2 × ZPU-1 14.5 mm guns	
5-Series class		Naval Dockyard (Myanmar)	565	2013	1 × 40 mm locally made single gun; 2 × ZPU-1 14.5 mm guns	
5-Series class		Naval Dockyard (Myanmar)	566	2013	1 × 40 mm locally made single gun; 2 × ZPU-1 14.5 mm guns	
5-Series class		Naval Dockyard (Myanmar)	567	2013	1 × 40 mm locally made single gun; 2 × ZPU-1 14.5 mm guns	
5-Series class		Naval Dockyard (Myanmar)	568	2013	1 × 40 mm locally made single gun; 2 × ZPU-1 14.5 mm guns	
5-Series class		Naval Dockyard (Myanmar)	569	2013	1 × 40 mm locally made single gun; 2 × ZPU-1 14.5 mm guns	
5-Series class		Naval Dockyard (Myanmar)	570	2013	1 × 40 mm locally made single gun; 2 × ZPU-1 14.5 mm guns	

=== Fast attack craft (Submarine chasers) ===
Class	Photo	Builder	Serial number	Year entered service	Armament	Note
Yan Nyein Aung class		Thanlyin Naval Dockyard, Myanmar	443 (Yan Nyein Aung)	24 December 2020	2 × twin Chinese Type 66 57 mm (2.2 in) guns; 2 × twin 2M-3M 25 mm (0.98 in) twin AA guns; 2 × RBU-1200 ASW rocket launchers; 2 × triple-tubed torpedo launchers for Shyena torpedoes; 2 × LDC (Large Depth Charge) throwers; Naval mines	63 m (206 ft 8 in) long stealth ASW ships. Commissioned on 24 December 2020.
Yan Nyein Aung class		Thanlyin Naval Dockyard, Myanmar	446 (Yan Ye Aung)	24 December 2020	2 × twin Chinese Type 66 57 mm (2.2 in) guns; 2 × twin 2M-3M 25 mm (0.98 in) twin AA guns; 2 × RBU-1200 ASW rocket launchers; 2 × triple-tubed torpedo launchers for Shyena torpedoes; 2 × LDC (Large Depth Charge) throwers; Naval mines	63 m (206 ft 8 in) long stealth ASW ships. Commissioned on 24 December 2020.
Yan Nyein Aung class		Thanlyin Naval Dockyard, Myanmar	445 (Yan Min Aung)[24]	24 December 2024	2 × twin Chinese Type 66 57 mm (2.2 in) guns; 2 × twin 2M-3M 25 mm (0.98 in) twin AA guns; 2 × RBU-1200 ASW rocket launchers; 2 × triple-tubed torpedo launchers for Shyena torpedoes; 2 × LDC (Large Depth Charge) throwers; Naval mines	63 m (206 ft 8 in) long stealth ASW ships. Commissioned on 24 December 2020.
Yan Nyein Aung class		Thanlyin Naval Dockyard, Myanmar	450 (Yan Zwe Aung) [24]	24 December 2024	2 × twin Chinese Type 66 57 mm (2.2 in) guns; 2 × twin 2M-3M 25 mm (0.98 in) twin AA guns; 2 × RBU-1200 ASW rocket launchers; 2 × triple-tubed torpedo launchers for Shyena torpedoes; 2 × LDC (Large Depth Charge) throwers; Naval mines	63 m (206 ft 8 in) long stealth ASW ships. Commissioned on 24 December 2020.
Hainan class		Dalian, Qiuxin and Huangpu Shipyard, China	441 (Yan Sit Aung)	1991	2 × twin Chinese Type 66 57 mm guns; 2 × twin Chinese Type 61 25 mm guns; 4 × RBU-1200 or Type 81 ASW rocket launchers; 2 × BMB-2 ASW mortars; 2 × depth charge rails with more than 20 depth charges, and mine rails (10 mines total)	443 (Yan Nyein Aung) and 446 (Yan Ye Aung) were retired in 2019. 441 was sunk by Cyclone Nargis in 2008. Recovered, renovated and recommissioned in 2009. Six craft were received in 1991 and four more craft in 1993.
Hainan class		Dalian, Qiuxin and Huangpu Shipyard, China	442 (Yan Htet Aung)	1991	2 × twin Chinese Type 66 57 mm guns; 2 × twin Chinese Type 61 25 mm guns; 4 × RBU-1200 or Type 81 ASW rocket launchers; 2 × BMB-2 ASW mortars; 2 × depth charge rails with more than 20 depth charges, and mine rails (10 mines total)	443 (Yan Nyein Aung) and 446 (Yan Ye Aung) were retired in 2019. 441 was sunk by Cyclone Nargis in 2008. Recovered, renovated and recommissioned in 2009. Six craft were received in 1991 and four more craft in 1993.
Hainan class		Dalian, Qiuxin and Huangpu Shipyard, China	444 (Yan Khwinn Aung)	1991	2 × twin Chinese Type 66 57 mm guns; 2 × twin Chinese Type 61 25 mm guns; 4 × RBU-1200 or Type 81 ASW rocket launchers; 2 × BMB-2 ASW mortars; 2 × depth charge rails with more than 20 depth charges, and mine rails (10 mines total)	443 (Yan Nyein Aung) and 446 (Yan Ye Aung) were retired in 2019. 441 was sunk by Cyclone Nargis in 2008. Recovered, renovated and recommissioned in 2009. Six craft were received in 1991 and four more craft in 1993.
Hainan class		Dalian, Qiuxin and Huangpu Shipyard, China	445 (Yan Min Aung)	1991	2 × twin Chinese Type 66 57 mm guns; 2 × twin Chinese Type 61 25 mm guns; 4 × RBU-1200 or Type 81 ASW rocket launchers; 2 × BMB-2 ASW mortars; 2 × depth charge rails with more than 20 depth charges, and mine rails (10 mines total)	443 (Yan Nyein Aung) and 446 (Yan Ye Aung) were retired in 2019. 441 was sunk by Cyclone Nargis in 2008. Recovered, renovated and recommissioned in 2009. Six craft were received in 1991 and four more craft in 1993.
Hainan class		Dalian, Qiuxin and Huangpu Shipyard, China	447 (Yan Paing Aung)	1992	2 × twin Chinese Type 66 57 mm guns; 2 × twin Chinese Type 61 25 mm guns; 4 × RBU-1200 or Type 81 ASW rocket launchers; 2 × BMB-2 ASW mortars; 2 × depth charge rails with more than 20 depth charges, and mine rails (10 mines total)	443 (Yan Nyein Aung) and 446 (Yan Ye Aung) were retired in 2019. 441 was sunk by Cyclone Nargis in 2008. Recovered, renovated and recommissioned in 2009. Six craft were received in 1991 and four more craft in 1993.
Hainan class		Dalian, Qiuxin and Huangpu Shipyard, China	448 (Yan Win Aung)	1992	2 × twin Chinese Type 66 57 mm guns; 2 × twin Chinese Type 61 25 mm guns; 4 × RBU-1200 or Type 81 ASW rocket launchers; 2 × BMB-2 ASW mortars; 2 × depth charge rails with more than 20 depth charges, and mine rails (10 mines total)	443 (Yan Nyein Aung) and 446 (Yan Ye Aung) were retired in 2019. 441 was sunk by Cyclone Nargis in 2008. Recovered, renovated and recommissioned in 2009. Six craft were received in 1991 and four more craft in 1993.
Hainan class		Dalian, Qiuxin and Huangpu Shipyard, China	449 (Yan Aye Aung)	1992	2 × twin Chinese Type 66 57 mm guns; 2 × twin Chinese Type 61 25 mm guns; 4 × RBU-1200 or Type 81 ASW rocket launchers; 2 × BMB-2 ASW mortars; 2 × depth charge rails with more than 20 depth charges, and mine rails (10 mines total)	443 (Yan Nyein Aung) and 446 (Yan Ye Aung) were retired in 2019. 441 was sunk by Cyclone Nargis in 2008. Recovered, renovated and recommissioned in 2009. Six craft were received in 1991 and four more craft in 1993.
Hainan class		Dalian, Qiuxin and Huangpu Shipyard, China	450 (Yan Zwe Aung)	1992	2 × twin Chinese Type 66 57 mm guns; 2 × twin Chinese Type 61 25 mm guns; 4 × RBU-1200 or Type 81 ASW rocket launchers; 2 × BMB-2 ASW mortars; 2 × depth charge rails with more than 20 depth charges, and mine rails (10 mines total)	443 (Yan Nyein Aung) and 446 (Yan Ye Aung) were retired in 2019. 441 was sunk by Cyclone Nargis in 2008. Recovered, renovated and recommissioned in 2009. Six craft were received in 1991 and four more craft in 1993.

=== Offshore patrol vessels (OPV) ===
Class	Photo	Builder	Serial number	Year entered service	Armament	Note
Osprey-50 class		Danyard A/S, Frederikshavn, Denmark	55 (Indaw)	1982	1 × 40 mm 60 cal. Bofors AA gun; 2 × 20 mm 70 cal. Oerlikon AA guns	56 (UMS Inma) sank in 1987.
Osprey-50 class		Danyard A/S, Frederikshavn, Denmark	57 (UMS Inya)	1982	1 × 40 mm 60 cal. Bofors AA gun; 2 × 20 mm 70 cal. Oerlikon AA guns	57 (Inya) was fitted with survey equipment in 2013.
Inlay class		Naval Dock, Myanmar	54 (Inlay)	24 December 2017	1 × Type 66 57 mm twin guns; 2 × QJG-02G heavy machine guns	Commissioned on 24 December 2017.
Inlay class		Naval Dock, Myanmar	53 (Inma)	24 December 2021	1 × Type 66 57 mm twin guns; 2 × QJG-02G heavy machine guns	Commissioned on 24 December 2021

=== Inshore patrol vessels (IPV) ===
Class	Builder	Serial number	Year entered service	Armament	Note
PGM-39-class gunboat	Marinette Marine, Wisconsin; last two by Peterson Builders, Sturgeon Bay, Wisconsin, United States	401; 402; 403; 404; 405; 406	1959–1961	1 × Bofors 40 mm gun 2 × dual Oerlikon 20 mm cannon 2 × 12.7 mm MG 9	
Y311 class – modified Y301	Sinmalaik, Myanmar	Y311	1967	2 × Bofors 40 mm gun	Y312 was reported sunk by Cyclone Nargis
Y Series class	Uljanik SY, Pola, Yugoslavia (Socialist Federal Republic of Yugoslavia)	301; 302; 303; 304; 305; 306; 307; 308; 309; 310	1957–1960	2 × Bofors 40 mm gun 2 × Oerlikon 20 mm cannon	
PGM-421 class or Swift class	Vosper Naval Systems Pte Ltd, Singapore	422; 423	1980	2 × Bofors 40 mm gun 2 × Oerlikon 20 mm cannon 2 × 12.7 mm machine guns Pathfinder radar	421 lost at sea
33meter Coastal Attack/Patrol Craft	Myanmar	UMS427 UMS428	2023	RCWS, Machines guns	Officially commission at Myanmar navy anniversary 2023.

=== River patrol craft ===
Class	Photo	Builder	Serial number	Year entered service	Armament	Note
PBR class		United States	211; 212; 213; 214; 215; 216	1978–1982	1 × twin M2HB .50-caliber (12.7 mm) machine guns (forward in a rotating tub); 1 × single M2HB (rear); 1 or 2 × M60 7.62 mm machine gun(s) (side-mounted); 1 × 40 mm Mk 19 grenade launcher	
21m river patrol craft		Myanmar	211; 212	2019	1 × QJG-02G heavy machine gun	
18m River fast patrol craft (likely CB-90 with bow ramp)		Myanmar	215 2nd boat (Unknown)	2021	RCWS, machine guns and others	Commission at navy day
20m River patrol craft		Myanmar	Unknown (2 boats)	2021	RCWS, machine guns and o	Commission at navy day
River patrol craft		Myanmar	217	2023	RCWS, machine guns	commission at navy day
Yan Naing class		Myanmar	501; 502; 503; 504; 505; 506; 507; 508; 509; 510	1970	Machine gun, OA	
Michao class		Yugoslavia (Socialist Federal Republic of Yugoslavia)	001; 002; 003; 004; 005; 006; 007; 008; 009; 010; 011; 012; 013; 014; 015; 016; 017; 018; 019; 020; 021; 022; 023; 024; 025	1963–1968	2 × 20 mm OA	

=== Fast patrol craft ===
Class	Photo	Builder	Serial number	Year entered service	Armament	Note
Carpentaria class		Australia	112	1979	1 × 20 mm 70 cal. MK-10 AA gun; 1 × 12.7 mm gun; 20 mm 70 cal. gun	Some sources said that Myanmar possesses six ships of this class. 115 was transformed into a coastal survey ship.
Carpentaria class		Australia	113	1979	1 × 20 mm 70 cal. MK-10 AA gun; 1 × 12.7 mm gun; 20 mm 70 cal. gun	Some sources said that Myanmar possesses six ships of this class. 115 was transformed into a coastal survey ship.
Carpentaria class		Australia	114	1980	1 × 20 mm 70 cal. MK-10 AA gun; 1 × 12.7 mm gun; 20 mm 70 cal. gun	Some sources said that Myanmar possesses six ships of this class. 115 was transformed into a coastal survey ship.
Carpentaria class		Australia	116	1980	1 × 20 mm 70 cal. MK-10 AA gun; 1 × 12.7 mm gun; 20 mm 70 cal. gun	Some sources said that Myanmar possesses six ships of this class. 115 was transformed into a coastal survey ship.
No 117 class		Naval Dockyard Myanmar	117	1990	2 × 12.7 mm heavy machine guns	Small high-speed patrol boats.
No 117 class		Naval Dockyard Myanmar	118	1990	2 × 12.7 mm heavy machine guns	Small high-speed patrol boats.
No 117 class		Naval Dockyard Myanmar	119	1990	2 × 12.7 mm heavy machine guns	Small high-speed patrol boats.
No 117 class		Naval Dockyard Myanmar	120	1990	2 × 12.7 mm heavy machine guns	Small high-speed patrol boats.
PGM-412 class		Myanmar Naval Dockyard, Yangon	412	1983	2 × 40 mm AA guns; 2 × 12.7 mm machine guns	PGM-411 was sunk by an accident at Tanintharyi Naval Base.
PGM-412 class		Myanmar Naval Dockyard, Yangon	413	1983	2 × 40 mm AA guns; 2 × 12.7 mm machine guns	PGM-411 was sunk by an accident at Tanintharyi Naval Base.
PGM-412 class		Myanmar Naval Dockyard, Yangon	414	1984	2 × 40 mm AA guns; 2 × 12.7 mm machine guns	PGM-411 was sunk by an accident at Tanintharyi Naval Base.
PGM-412 class		Myanmar Naval Dockyard, Yangon	415	1984	2 × 40 mm AA guns; 2 × 12.7 mm machine guns	PGM-411 was sunk by an accident at Tanintharyi Naval Base.
PGM-412 class		Myanmar Naval Dockyard, Yangon	416	1984	2 × 40 mm AA guns; 2 × 12.7 mm machine guns	PGM-411 was sunk by an accident at Tanintharyi Naval Base.
PGM-412 class		Myanmar Naval Dockyard, Yangon	331 (Thiha Yarzar-I)	June 1993	2 × 40 mm AA guns; 2 × 12.7 mm machine guns	Used by Myanmar Maritime Police Force.
PGM-412 class		Myanmar Naval Dockyard, Yangon	332 (Thiha Yarzar-II)	June 1993	2 × 40 mm AA guns; 2 × 12.7 mm machine guns	Used by Myanmar Maritime Police Force.
PB-90 class		Yugoslavia (Socialist Federal Republic of Yugoslavia)	424	1 November 1990	2 × M-75 quadruple guns; 2 × machine guns	Bought from Yugoslavia.
PB-90 class		Yugoslavia (Socialist Federal Republic of Yugoslavia)	425	1 November 1990	2 × M-75 quadruple guns; 2 × machine guns	Bought from Yugoslavia.
PB-90 class		Yugoslavia (Socialist Federal Republic of Yugoslavia)	426	1 November 1990	2 × M-75 quadruple guns; 2 × machine guns	Bought from Yugoslavia.
Nga Man class		Thanlyin Naval Dockyard Myanmar	Ngaman-001	2012	2 × 12.7 mm machine guns	Used for border patrol at the Naf River. Mostly used by Myanmar Navy Seals.
Nga Man class		Thanlyin Naval Dockyard Myanmar	Ngaman-002	2012	2 × 12.7 mm machine guns	Used for border patrol at the Naf River. Mostly used by Myanmar Navy Seals.
Nga Man class		Thanlyin Naval Dockyard Myanmar	Ngaman-003	2012	2 × 12.7 mm machine guns	Used for border patrol at the Naf River. Mostly used by Myanmar Navy Seals.
Nga Man class		Thanlyin Naval Dockyard Myanmar	Ngaman-004	2012	2 × 12.7 mm machine guns	Used for border patrol at the Naf River. Mostly used by Myanmar Navy Seals.
Nga Man class		Thanlyin Naval Dockyard Myanmar	Ngaman-005	2012	2 × 12.7 mm machine guns	Used for border patrol at the Naf River. Mostly used by Myanmar Navy Seals.
Nga Man class		Thanlyin Naval Dockyard Myanmar	Ngaman-006	2012	2 × 12.7 mm machine guns	Used for border patrol at the Naf River. Mostly used by Myanmar Navy Seals.
Super Dvora Mk III class		Israel	271	24 December 2017	1 × Typhoon 25–30 mm stabilized cannon/Oerlikon 20 mm cannon; 2 × 12.7 mm machine guns	Built in Israel.
Super Dvora Mk III class		Israel	272	24 December 2017	1 × Typhoon 25–30 mm stabilized cannon/Oerlikon 20 mm cannon; 2 × 12.7 mm machine guns	Built in Israel.
Super Dvora Mk III class		Thanlyin Naval Dockyard Myanmar	273	24 December 2019	1 × locally made twin 14.5 mm DI-RCWS guns; 1 × 14.5 mm QJG-02G heavy machine gun	Built at the Thanlyin Naval Dockyard with TOT.
Super Dvora Mk III class		Thanlyin Naval Dockyard Myanmar	274	24 December 2019	1 × locally made twin 14.5 mm DI-RCWS guns; 1 × 14.5 mm QJG-02G heavy machine gun	Built at the Thanlyin Naval Dockyard with TOT.
Super Dvora Mk III class		Thanlyin Naval Dockyard Myanmar	275	24 December 2022	1 × locally made twin 14.5 mm DI-RCWS guns; 1 × 14.5 mm QJG-02G heavy machine gun	Built at the Thanlyin Naval Dockyard with TOT.
Super Dvora Mk III class		Thanlyin Naval Dockyard Myanmar	276	24 December 2022	1 × locally made twin 14.5 mm DI-RCWS guns; 1 × 14.5 mm QJG-02G heavy machine gun	Built at the Thanlyin Naval Dockyard with TOT.
Super Dvora Mk III class		Thanlyin Naval Dockyard Myanmar	277	24 December 2023	1 × locally made twin 14.5 mm DI-RCWS guns; 1 × 14.5 mm QJG-02G heavy machine gun	Built at the Thanlyin Naval Dockyard with TOT.
Super Dvora Mk III class		Thanlyin Naval Dockyard Myanmar	278	24 December 2023	1 × locally made twin 14.5 mm DI-RCWS guns; 1 × 14.5 mm QJG-02G heavy machine gun	Built at the Thanlyin Naval Dockyard with TOT.

=== Torpedo boats ===
Class	Builder	Photo	Serial number	Year entered service	Armament	Note
Torpedo boat	Naval Dockyard (Myanmar)		T201	2014	2 × QJG-02G 14.5 mm heavy machine guns 8 × torpedo	With an aluminium body and a length of 21 m (70 ft), the new torpedo boat has low observable radar characteristics, a maximum speed of 35 knots (65 km/h; 40 mph), and is reportedly armed with up to eight Russian- or Chinese-manufactured torpedoes.

=== Minesweepers ===
Class	Photo	Builder	Serial number	Year entered service	Armament	Note
PCE-842 class		United States	41 (UMS Yan Taine Aung)	1967	1 × 3-inch (76 mm)/50-caliber DP gun; 2 × twin Bofors 40 mm guns; 1 × Hedgehog anti-submarine mortar; 2 × depth charge tracks	Both ships were decommissioned since 1994. Use as honourable gun salute ships in naval ceremonies.
Admirable class		United States	42 (UMS Yan Gyi Aung)	1967	1 × 3-inch/50-caliber gun; 4 × Bofors 40 mm gun; 6 × Oerlikon 20 mm cannon; 1 × Hedgehog anti-submarine mortar; 4 × depth charge projectors; 2 × depth charge racks; 2 × minesweeping paravanes	Both ships were decommissioned since 1994. Use as honourable gun salute ships in naval ceremonies.

=== Hospital ships ===
Class	Photo	Builder	Serial number	Year entered service	Armament	Note
Shwe Pu Zun class		Naval Shipyard Myanmar	AH-01 (UMS Shwe Pu Zun)	2012	None	Used as the river troop transport ship, UMS Shwe Pu Zun from 1960s to 2010. The Myanmar Navy transformed it into a hospital ship and commissioned it in 2012.
Thanlwin class		Wusong Shipyard, Shanghai, China China (built) Thanlyin Naval Shipyard Myanmar (modified)	AH-02 (UMS Thanlwin)	24 December 2015	None	Ex-MV Thanlwin which was owned by 5-Stars Shipping Co. Ltd from 2001 to 2013. The Myanmar Navy transformed it into a hospital ship and re-commissioned it on 24 December 2015. It contains a CT scan room, 25 hospital beds, a minor eye operation room, a minor operation theater and a major operation theater in addition to an intensive care unit (ICU).

=== Troop transports/Troop carriers ===
Class	Photo	Builder	Serial number	Year entered service	Armament	Note
VIP transport ship
Yadanarbon class		Naval Shipyard Myanmar	UMS Yadanarbon	1990	None	Mostly used at the annual Naval Day Ceremony, which is always held on 24 December.
River troop transport
Saban class		Naval Dockyard Myanmar	Sagu	1960s	2 × Oerlikon 20 mm cannons	Only two ships of this class, UMS Sagu and UMS Shwe Puzun, are still active. Shwe Puzun was transformed into a hospital ship, and Sagu is now used as an escort ship to support and protect river hospital ship AH-01 (UMS Shwe Pu Zun). The other ships (Saban, Seinda, Sethya, Setyahat, Shwe Thidar and Sin Min) were retired.
Coastal troop transport
Coastal transport ships		Naval Dockyard Myanmar	612	1990	2 × AA guns	
Coastal transport ships		Naval Dockyard Myanmar	613	1990	2 × AA guns	
Coastal transport ships		Naval Dockyard Myanmar	615	1990	2 × AA guns	
Coastal transport ships		Naval Dockyard Myanmar	618	1990	2 × AA guns	
Troop carriers
Chin Dwin class		Wusong Shipyard, Shanghai, China China (built) Thanlyin Naval Dockyard Myanmar (modernized)	AP-01 (UMS Chin Dwin)	24 December 2016	None	Ex-MV Chin Dwin (hospital ship) which was owned by 5 Stars Shipping Co. Ltd. The Myanmar Navy transformed it into a troop carrier and commissioned it on 24 December 2016.
Myit Kyi Na class		Langsten Slip & Batbyggeri A/S, Tomra-i-Ramsdal, Norway Norway (built) Thanlyin Naval Dockyard Myanmar (modernized)	AP-03 (UMS Myit Kyi Na)	24 December 2019	2 × QJG-02G heavy machine guns	Ex-MV Myit Kyi Na which was owned by 5 Stars Shipping Co. Ltd. The Myanmar Navy transformed it into a troop carrier and commissioned it on 24 December 2019.

=== Landing Craft Utility (LCU) ===
Class	Builder	Serial number	Year entered service	Armament	Note
LCU	United States	603 (Aya Lulin)	1963–1968	none	Bought from United States between 1963 and 1968.
LCU	Naval Dock (Myanmar)	605 (Aya Maung)	1984	none	Built by the Myanmar Navy in 1984.
LCU	Unknown	Unknown	2019	none	Seen within LPD at 2019 commission ceremony.
LCU	Myanmar	1721 1722	2022	machine gun, Rocket Launcher	Indigenous design, commission on 2022 navy day.

=== Landing Craft Medium (LCM) ===
Class	Photo	Builder	Serial number	Commissioned	Armament	Note
LCM		Naval Engineering Depot (Myanmar)	701	1963–1967	None	Ten LCM built by the Myanmar Navy between 1963 and 1968.
LCM		Naval Engineering Depot (Myanmar)	702	1963–1967	None	Ten LCM built by the Myanmar Navy between 1963 and 1968.
LCM		Naval Engineering Depot (Myanmar)	703	1963–1967	None	Ten LCM built by the Myanmar Navy between 1963 and 1968.
LCM		Naval Engineering Depot (Myanmar)	704	1963–1967	None	Ten LCM built by the Myanmar Navy between 1963 and 1968.
LCM		Naval Engineering Depot (Myanmar)	705	1963–1967	None	Ten LCM built by the Myanmar Navy between 1963 and 1968.
LCM		Naval Engineering Depot (Myanmar)	706	1963–1967	None	Ten LCM built by the Myanmar Navy between 1963 and 1968.
LCM		Naval Engineering Depot (Myanmar)	707	1963–1967	None	Ten LCM built by the Myanmar Navy between 1963 and 1968.
LCM		Naval Engineering Depot (Myanmar)	708	1963–1967	None	Ten LCM built by the Myanmar Navy between 1963 and 1968.
LCM		Naval Engineering Depot (Myanmar)	709	December 1968	None	Ten LCM built by the Myanmar Navy between 1963 and 1968.
LCM		Naval Engineering Depot (Myanmar)	710	December 1968	None	Ten LCM built by the Myanmar Navy between 1963 and 1968.
LCM		Naval Shipyard (Myanmar)	1611	2005 × 14.5 mm heavy machine gun	56 m (183 ft 9 in) long LCMs which can carry four armored vehicles or four tanks. Commissioned in 2005, 2013, 2017 and 2020.	Two LCMs of unknown serial numbers were heavily damaged and captured, of which one sank, by the Arakan Army in Kaladan River in February 2024.
LCM		Naval Shipyard (Myanmar)	1612	2013	56 m (183 ft 9 in) long LCMs which can carry four armored vehicles or four tanks. Commissioned in 2005, 2013, 2017 and 2020.	Two LCMs of unknown serial numbers were heavily damaged and captured, of which one sank, by the Arakan Army in Kaladan River in February 2024.
LCM		Naval Shipyard (Myanmar)	1613	2013	56 m (183 ft 9 in) long LCMs which can carry four armored vehicles or four tanks. Commissioned in 2005, 2013, 2017 and 2020.	Two LCMs of unknown serial numbers were heavily damaged and captured, of which one sank, by the Arakan Army in Kaladan River in February 2024.
LCM		Naval Shipyard (Myanmar)	1614	24 December 2017	56 m (183 ft 9 in) long LCMs which can carry four armored vehicles or four tanks. Commissioned in 2005, 2013, 2017 and 2020.	Two LCMs of unknown serial numbers were heavily damaged and captured, of which one sank, by the Arakan Army in Kaladan River in February 2024.
LCM		Naval Shipyard (Myanmar)	1615	24 December 2017	56 m (183 ft 9 in) long LCMs which can carry four armored vehicles or four tanks. Commissioned in 2005, 2013, 2017 and 2020.	Two LCMs of unknown serial numbers were heavily damaged and captured, of which one sank, by the Arakan Army in Kaladan River in February 2024.
LCM		Naval Shipyard (Myanmar)	1616	24 December 2020	56 m (183 ft 9 in) long LCMs which can carry four armored vehicles or four tanks. Commissioned in 2005, 2013, 2017 and 2020.	Two LCMs of unknown serial numbers were heavily damaged and captured, of which one sank, by the Arakan Army in Kaladan River in February 2024.

=== Landing Craft Tank (LCT) ===
Class	Photo	Builder	Serial number	Commissioned	Armament	Note	
LCT		Naval Dockyard (Myanmar)	1701	24 December 2015	Machine guns	29 m (95 ft 2 in) long LCTs which can carry two armoured vehicles or two tanks and soldiers. 1701 through 1706 commissioned in 2015, 1707 through 1712 in 2016, 1713 through 1716 in 2017 and 1717 through 1720 in 2018.	One LCT of unknown serial number was sunk by the Arakan Army in Kaladan River in February 2024.
LCT		Naval Dockyard (Myanmar)	1702	24 December 2015	Machine guns	29 m (95 ft 2 in) long LCTs which can carry two armoured vehicles or two tanks and soldiers. 1701 through 1706 commissioned in 2015, 1707 through 1712 in 2016, 1713 through 1716 in 2017 and 1717 through 1720 in 2018.	One LCT of unknown serial number was sunk by the Arakan Army in Kaladan River in February 2024.
LCT		Naval Dockyard (Myanmar)	1703	24 December 2015	Machine guns	29 m (95 ft 2 in) long LCTs which can carry two armoured vehicles or two tanks and soldiers. 1701 through 1706 commissioned in 2015, 1707 through 1712 in 2016, 1713 through 1716 in 2017 and 1717 through 1720 in 2018.	One LCT of unknown serial number was sunk by the Arakan Army in Kaladan River in February 2024.
LCT		Naval Dockyard (Myanmar)	1704	24 December 2015	Machine guns	29 m (95 ft 2 in) long LCTs which can carry two armoured vehicles or two tanks and soldiers. 1701 through 1706 commissioned in 2015, 1707 through 1712 in 2016, 1713 through 1716 in 2017 and 1717 through 1720 in 2018.	One LCT of unknown serial number was sunk by the Arakan Army in Kaladan River in February 2024.
LCT		Naval Dockyard (Myanmar)	1705	24 December 2015	Machine guns	29 m (95 ft 2 in) long LCTs which can carry two armoured vehicles or two tanks and soldiers. 1701 through 1706 commissioned in 2015, 1707 through 1712 in 2016, 1713 through 1716 in 2017 and 1717 through 1720 in 2018.	One LCT of unknown serial number was sunk by the Arakan Army in Kaladan River in February 2024.
LCT		Naval Dockyard (Myanmar)	1706	24 December 2015	Machine guns	29 m (95 ft 2 in) long LCTs which can carry two armoured vehicles or two tanks and soldiers. 1701 through 1706 commissioned in 2015, 1707 through 1712 in 2016, 1713 through 1716 in 2017 and 1717 through 1720 in 2018.	One LCT of unknown serial number was sunk by the Arakan Army in Kaladan River in February 2024.
LCT		Naval Dockyard (Myanmar)	1707	24 December 2016	Machine guns	29 m (95 ft 2 in) long LCTs which can carry two armoured vehicles or two tanks and soldiers. 1701 through 1706 commissioned in 2015, 1707 through 1712 in 2016, 1713 through 1716 in 2017 and 1717 through 1720 in 2018.	One LCT of unknown serial number was sunk by the Arakan Army in Kaladan River in February 2024.
LCT		Naval Dockyard (Myanmar)	1708	24 December 2016	Machine guns	29 m (95 ft 2 in) long LCTs which can carry two armoured vehicles or two tanks and soldiers. 1701 through 1706 commissioned in 2015, 1707 through 1712 in 2016, 1713 through 1716 in 2017 and 1717 through 1720 in 2018.	One LCT of unknown serial number was sunk by the Arakan Army in Kaladan River in February 2024.
LCT		Naval Dockyard (Myanmar)	1709	24 December 2016	Machine guns	29 m (95 ft 2 in) long LCTs which can carry two armoured vehicles or two tanks and soldiers. 1701 through 1706 commissioned in 2015, 1707 through 1712 in 2016, 1713 through 1716 in 2017 and 1717 through 1720 in 2018.	One LCT of unknown serial number was sunk by the Arakan Army in Kaladan River in February 2024.
LCT		Naval Dockyard (Myanmar)	1710	24 December 2016	Machine guns	29 m (95 ft 2 in) long LCTs which can carry two armoured vehicles or two tanks and soldiers. 1701 through 1706 commissioned in 2015, 1707 through 1712 in 2016, 1713 through 1716 in 2017 and 1717 through 1720 in 2018.	One LCT of unknown serial number was sunk by the Arakan Army in Kaladan River in February 2024.
LCT		Naval Dockyard (Myanmar)	1711	24 December 2016	Machine guns	29 m (95 ft 2 in) long LCTs which can carry two armoured vehicles or two tanks and soldiers. 1701 through 1706 commissioned in 2015, 1707 through 1712 in 2016, 1713 through 1716 in 2017 and 1717 through 1720 in 2018.	One LCT of unknown serial number was sunk by the Arakan Army in Kaladan River in February 2024.
LCT		Naval Dockyard (Myanmar)	1712	24 December 2016	Machine guns	29 m (95 ft 2 in) long LCTs which can carry two armoured vehicles or two tanks and soldiers. 1701 through 1706 commissioned in 2015, 1707 through 1712 in 2016, 1713 through 1716 in 2017 and 1717 through 1720 in 2018.	One LCT of unknown serial number was sunk by the Arakan Army in Kaladan River in February 2024.
LCT		Naval Dockyard (Myanmar)	1713	24 December 2017	Machine guns	29 m (95 ft 2 in) long LCTs which can carry two armoured vehicles or two tanks and soldiers. 1701 through 1706 commissioned in 2015, 1707 through 1712 in 2016, 1713 through 1716 in 2017 and 1717 through 1720 in 2018.	One LCT of unknown serial number was sunk by the Arakan Army in Kaladan River in February 2024.
LCT		Naval Dockyard (Myanmar)	1714	24 December 2017	Machine guns	29 m (95 ft 2 in) long LCTs which can carry two armoured vehicles or two tanks and soldiers. 1701 through 1706 commissioned in 2015, 1707 through 1712 in 2016, 1713 through 1716 in 2017 and 1717 through 1720 in 2018.	One LCT of unknown serial number was sunk by the Arakan Army in Kaladan River in February 2024.
LCT		Naval Dockyard (Myanmar)	1715	24 December 2017	Machine guns	29 m (95 ft 2 in) long LCTs which can carry two armoured vehicles or two tanks and soldiers. 1701 through 1706 commissioned in 2015, 1707 through 1712 in 2016, 1713 through 1716 in 2017 and 1717 through 1720 in 2018.	One LCT of unknown serial number was sunk by the Arakan Army in Kaladan River in February 2024.
LCT		Naval Dockyard (Myanmar)	1716	24 December 2017	Machine guns	29 m (95 ft 2 in) long LCTs which can carry two armoured vehicles or two tanks and soldiers. 1701 through 1706 commissioned in 2015, 1707 through 1712 in 2016, 1713 through 1716 in 2017 and 1717 through 1720 in 2018.	One LCT of unknown serial number was sunk by the Arakan Army in Kaladan River in February 2024.
LCT		Naval Dockyard (Myanmar)	1717	24 December 2018	Machine guns	29 m (95 ft 2 in) long LCTs which can carry two armoured vehicles or two tanks and soldiers. 1701 through 1706 commissioned in 2015, 1707 through 1712 in 2016, 1713 through 1716 in 2017 and 1717 through 1720 in 2018.	One LCT of unknown serial number was sunk by the Arakan Army in Kaladan River in February 2024.
LCT		Naval Dockyard (Myanmar)	1718	24 December 2018	Machine guns	29 m (95 ft 2 in) long LCTs which can carry two armoured vehicles or two tanks and soldiers. 1701 through 1706 commissioned in 2015, 1707 through 1712 in 2016, 1713 through 1716 in 2017 and 1717 through 1720 in 2018.	One LCT of unknown serial number was sunk by the Arakan Army in Kaladan River in February 2024.
LCT		Naval Dockyard (Myanmar)	1719	24 December 2018	Machine guns	29 m (95 ft 2 in) long LCTs which can carry two armoured vehicles or two tanks and soldiers. 1701 through 1706 commissioned in 2015, 1707 through 1712 in 2016, 1713 through 1716 in 2017 and 1717 through 1720 in 2018.	One LCT of unknown serial number was sunk by the Arakan Army in Kaladan River in February 2024.
LCT		Naval Dockyard (Myanmar)	1720	24 December 2018	Machine guns	29 m (95 ft 2 in) long LCTs which can carry two armoured vehicles or two tanks and soldiers. 1701 through 1706 commissioned in 2015, 1707 through 1712 in 2016, 1713 through 1716 in 2017 and 1717 through 1720 in 2018.	One LCT of unknown serial number was sunk by the Arakan Army in Kaladan River in February 2024.

=== Survey ships ===
Class	Builder	Serial number	Year entered service	Armament	Note
Survey ship	Tito SY, Belgrade, Yugoslavia (Socialist Federal Republic of Yugoslavia)	801 (UMS Thutaythi)	1965	2 × 40 mm naval gun; 2 × 20 mm machine gun	Helipad and hangar.
Survey ship	Singapore	802	1980	None	Ex. survey ship from Singapore. It was captured by the Myanmar Navy in 1974 and is used as an ocean survey ship.
Survey ship	Myanmar	807	1962	2 × 20 mm machine gun	
Carpenteria class	Australia	115	2013	2 × 40 mm naval gun; 2 × 20 mm machine gun	At first, it was used as coastal patrol craft. In 2013, it was fitted with survey equipment and changed into a coastal survey ship.

=== Coastal logistics and tanker ships ===
Class	Photo	Builder	Serial number	Year entered service	Armament	Note
Coastal tanker		Watenabe Zosen K.K., Hakata, Japan Japan	608	1991	None	
Coastal tanker		Shimoda Dockyard, Shimoda, Japan Japan	609 class	1986	None	
Coastal logistics ship		Germany	601 Pyi Daw Aye (1)	1975	None	
Coastal logistics ship		Japan	602 Pyi Daw Aye (2)	2002	None	
Coastal logistics ship		A/S Nordsovaerftet, Ringkobing, Norway	Ayidawaya	1991	None	
Water Tanker		Unknown, may be Myanmar.	Unknown	2022	None	commission 2022 navy day

=== Tugboats ===
Class	Photo	Builder	Serial number	Year entered service	Armament	Note
Tugboat		Japan	603	1962	None	Bought from Japan in 1962.
Tugboat		Japan	604	1962	None	Bought from Japan in 1962.
Tugboat		Japan	163	1964	None	Bought from Japan in 1964.
Tugboat		Japan	164	1964	None	Bought from Japan in 1964.
Tugboat		Pakistan	605	1962	None	Bought from Pakistan in 1962.
Tugboat		Pakistan	606	1962	None	Bought from Pakistan in 1962.
Tugboat		Naval Dockyard (Myanmar) Myanmar	AT-01 (Nawat yat)	2013	* 2 × QJG-02G heavy machine guns	26 m (85 ft 4 in) long sea-going tug boats. AT-01 and AT-02 commissioned in 2013. AT-04 and AT-05 in 2018. AT-05 and AT-06 in 2019. AT-07 and AT-08 in 2020.
Tugboat		Naval Dockyard (Myanmar) Myanmar	AT-02 (Nagar Khay)	2013	* 2 × QJG-02G heavy machine guns	26 m (85 ft 4 in) long sea-going tug boats. AT-01 and AT-02 commissioned in 2013. AT-04 and AT-05 in 2018. AT-05 and AT-06 in 2019. AT-07 and AT-08 in 2020.
Tugboat		Naval Dockyard (Myanmar) Myanmar	AT-03 (Nagar Ni)	24 December 2018	* 2 × QJG-02G heavy machine guns	26 m (85 ft 4 in) long sea-going tug boats. AT-01 and AT-02 commissioned in 2013. AT-04 and AT-05 in 2018. AT-05 and AT-06 in 2019. AT-07 and AT-08 in 2020.
Tugboat		Naval Dockyard (Myanmar) Myanmar	AT-04 (Nagar Minn)	24 December 2018	* 2 × QJG-02G heavy machine guns	26 m (85 ft 4 in) long sea-going tug boats. AT-01 and AT-02 commissioned in 2013. AT-04 and AT-05 in 2018. AT-05 and AT-06 in 2019. AT-07 and AT-08 in 2020.
Tugboat		Naval Dockyard (Myanmar) Myanmar	AT-05 (Nagar Nat)	24 December 2019	* 2 × QJG-02G heavy machine guns	26 m (85 ft 4 in) long sea-going tug boats. AT-01 and AT-02 commissioned in 2013. AT-04 and AT-05 in 2018. AT-05 and AT-06 in 2019. AT-07 and AT-08 in 2020.
Tugboat		Naval Dockyard (Myanmar) Myanmar	AT-06 (Nagar Mouk)	24 December 2019	* 2 × QJG-02G heavy machine guns	26 m (85 ft 4 in) long sea-going tug boats. AT-01 and AT-02 commissioned in 2013. AT-04 and AT-05 in 2018. AT-05 and AT-06 in 2019. AT-07 and AT-08 in 2020.
Tugboat		Naval Dockyard (Myanmar) Myanmar	AT-07 (Naga Myan)	24 December 2020	* 2 × QJG-02G heavy machine guns	26 m (85 ft 4 in) long sea-going tug boats. AT-01 and AT-02 commissioned in 2013. AT-04 and AT-05 in 2018. AT-05 and AT-06 in 2019. AT-07 and AT-08 in 2020.
Tugboat		Naval Dockyard (Myanmar) Myanmar	AT-08 (Naga Twak)	24 December 2020	* 2 × QJG-02G heavy machine guns	26 m (85 ft 4 in) long sea-going tug boats. AT-01 and AT-02 commissioned in 2013. AT-04 and AT-05 in 2018. AT-05 and AT-06 in 2019. AT-07 and AT-08 in 2020.

=== Floating dry dock ===
Class	Photo	Builder	Serial number	Year entered service	Armament	Note
Floating dry dock		China	FD01 (UMS Saya Shan-1)	9 October 2013	None	
Floating dry dock		Myanmar	FD02 (UMS Saya Shan-2)	24 December 2018	None	65 m (213 ft 3 in) long floating dock.

=== Unmanned surface vehicle (USV) ===
Class	Builder	Serial number	Year entered service	Armament	Note
USV	Myanmar	Unknown	24 December 2014	1 × locally made unknown type RCWS	Seen on 67th Myanmar Navy Anniversary, 24 December 2014.
USV	Myanmar	Unknown	24 December 2016	1 × locally made unknown type RCWS	Seen on 69th Myanmar Navy Anniversary, 24 December 2016.

== Aircraft ==
=== Naval aviation ===
Aircraft	Photo	Origin	Type	Variant	In service	Notes
ATR 42		France	Maritime patrol aircraft	ATR 42	3	
Britten-Norman BN-2 Islander		UK	Maritime surveillance aircraft		5	Upgraded with WESCAM MX-15 FLIR
Ka-28 ASW Helicopter		Russia	Anti-submarine	Ka-28	2	Commissioned in 2022
Eurocopter AS365 Dauphin		France	Utility helicopter		7	Two inducted in 2021
Schiebel Camcopter S-100		Austria	UAV		Unknown	60 million USD contract (US$2 million per unit)

== Weapons ==
=== Missiles ===
Name	Photo	Origin	Type	Variant	In service	Note
C-801		China	Anti-ship cruise missile		120	30 received between 1995–1997 and 50 in 2004. They have been deployed on Houxin class and 55-Series-class fast attack craft. After the missiles were replaced by C-802s between 2013 and 2014, they are being used only at the annual Sea Shield naval exercise.
C-802		China	Anti-ship cruise missile		180	Received in 2009, 2012, 2014 and 2016. They were deployed on the Kyan Sittha-class frigates, two Type 053H1 frigates, Anawrahta-class corvettes, 491, Type 037IG Houxin-class fast attack craft and 5-Series-class fast attack craft.
C-802A		China	Anti-ship cruise missile		80	Received in 2018. They were deployed on the 492.
Kh-35U derivative Kumsong-3 (GeumSeong-3).		North Korea	Anti-ship cruise missile	Kumsong-3	80	Deployed on UMS Aung Zeya.
Retired
HY-2		China	Anti-ship cruise missile	SY-2A	20	Received in 2012. Deployed on the two Type 053H1 frigates for a few years. Later, they were substituted with C-802 missiles.

=== Torpedoes ===
Name	Photo	Origin	Type	In service	Note
Yu-7 torpedo		China	324 mm advanced light torpedo	Unknown	Deployed on UMS Aung Zeya.
Shyena torpedo		India	324 mm advanced light torpedo	First batch of 20 units received in 2019 as part of the $37.9 million deal to supply Shyena to the Myanmar Navy.	In March 2017, India signed a $37.9 million deal to supply Shyena to the Myanmar Navy. The first batch of these torpedoes was delivered in July 2019.
53-65KE torpedo		Russia	533 mm anti-submarine torpedo	50	Fitted on UMS Minye Theinkhathu.
TEST-71MKE torpedoes		Russia	533 mm TV-guided electric homing torpedo	Unknown	Fitted on UMS Minye Theinkhathu.
