= UBS Mayu =

Burmese and British warship (1943–1979)

Coordinates: 16.721489°N 96.228135°E

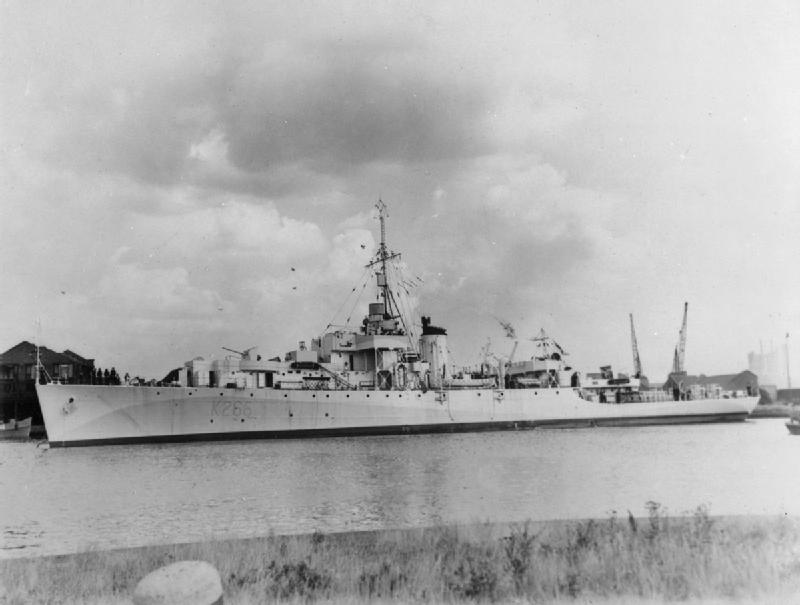
- HMS Fal in July 1943

History

United Kingdom
- Name: HMS Fal
- Namesake: River Fal
- Builder: Smiths Dock Company, South Bank-on-Tees, UK
- Laid down: 20 May 1942
- Launched: 9 November 1942
- Commissioned: 2 July 1943
- Fate: Transferred to Burmese Navy

Myanmar
- Name: HMBS Mayu (later UBS Mayu, UMS Mayu)
- Namesake: Mayu River
- Acquired: 25 May 1947
- Commissioned: 25 May 1947
- Decommissioned: 28 September 1979
- Fate: Museum ship

General characteristics
- Class & type: River-class frigate
- Displacement: 1,460 long tons (1,483 t) standard; 2,170 long tons (2,205 t) full load
- Length: 283 ft (86 m) p/p; 301 ft 3 in (91.82 m) o/a
- Beam: 36 ft 6 in (11.13 m)
- Draught: 9 ft (2.7 m); 13 ft (4.0 m) full load
- Propulsion: Reciprocating vertical triple expansion, 5,500 ihp (4,101 kW); 2 × Admiralty 3-drum boilers; 2 shafts; 440 long tons (447 t) oil fuel
- Speed: 20 knots (23 mph; 37 km/h)
- Range: 7,200 nmi (13,300 km) at 12 kn (14 mph; 22 km/h)
- Complement: 177 Officers & enlisted
- Armament: 2 × QF 4 in (100 mm) Mark XIX on single mounts CP Mk. XXIII; 4 × 40 mm Bofors A/A on single mounts Mk. VII; 1 × Hedgehog 24 barrel A/S projector; up to 150 depth charges

UBS Mayu was the first flagship of the Burmese Navy. She was commissioned on 25 May 1947 and saw 32 years of active service during which she participated in many counter-insurgency campaigns, safeguarding Myanmar's territorial waters, and also served as a training ship for the officers and ratings of Myanmar (Burma) Navy. The ship had been built as River-class frigate HMS Fal for the Royal Navy during World War II and was transferred to the Burmese government in 1947 on loan, and permanently in 1948. She was decommissioned in 1979 and was converted to a museum ship.

== History ==
=== As HMS Fal ===
HMS Fal was a River-class frigate of the Royal Navy, built for anti-submarine warfare and convoy escort duty in the Second World War. Her keel was laid down on 20 May 1942 in the United Kingdom. She was first commissioned by the Royal Navy on 2 July 1943.

After working up, Fal served for a time in the North Atlantic, before moving to Freetown for service on the West African convoy route between Lagos, Takoradi and Freetown. By this stage of the Atlantic campaign the U-boat threat had been diminished, and Fal's work was routine, seeing no enemy action. At the end of hostilities she was at Simonstown, and was transferred to the Far East, stationed at Rangoon.

The British Government gave her on loan to Burma, handing her over to the Burma Royal Naval Volunteer Reserve on 25 May 1947.

=== As HMBS Mayu ===
General Aung San accepted the transfer of the ship on behalf of the Government of Burma. During his acceptance speech, he renamed her to HMBS Mayu, after Mayu River in Arakan state to honour officers and men of Burma Royal Naval Volunteer Reserve, who fought against Imperial Japanese forces at the river during the Second World War. Lieutenant Commander Khin Maung Bo was the first commanding officer of HMBS Mayu. She took part in a 25 gun salute along with HMS Birmingham on 4 January 1948 to mark Burma's independence from the British colonial rule.

=== As UBS Mayu ===
On 29 August 1948, was transferred permanently to the Burma Navy as a free gift and she was officially renamed UBS Mayu.

UBS Mayu fought alongside other ships of Burmese Navy and units of Burma Army in various battles during the turbulent years that followed Burmese independence in 1948. She was involved in the following battles:

- Battle of Insein
- Battle of Pathein
- Battle of Kyauk Phyu
- Battle of Mawlamyaing
- Battle of Thanhlyin-KyiteKhout

She served as flagship of the Burma Navy throughout her service and was decommissioned in September 1979 after 32 years of active service. Following her decommissioning, she was designated as an historic war vessel and has been preserved as a museum ship at Myanmar Naval Training Headquarters, Seikkyi.

== General Aung San's acceptance speech ==
The following is the transcript of the acceptance speech made by General Aung San for the hand over of HMS Fal.

I accept on behalf of the Burma Government the free loan of HMS Fal generously offered by His Majesty's Government. This is an auspicious occasion as, with the hand-over of this frigate, the Burma Royal Naval Volunteer Reserve will have for the first time a Major Warship fit to withstand all weather conditions. In keeping with the national status of the country it will be desirable to rename this ship while she is being used by the Burma Navy. I propose to rename her after the River Mayu in Arakan with which the officers and men of the Burma Royal Naval Volunteer Reserve in active service during the last war had proud associations. As you are all aware it was along the beaches of this river that the Burma Royal Naval Volunteer Reserve played a prominent part in the active operations against the Japanese during the famous Arakan Campaigns. Their courage, determination and resolute during these operations have won for them a well-deserved praise and I as a Burman take pride in their achievements.

I wish to thank, on behalf of my government, Lt. Commander Mitchell, his officers and men for bringing this ship safely to our hands. I now rename the ship HMBS Mayu and hand over to Lt. Commander Khin Mg Bo to take charge of its command under the orders of the officer commanding, Burma Royal Naval Volunteer Reserve and the Burma Government.

25 May 1947

== See also ==
- Kilo-class submarine
- Makassar-class landing platform dock
- UMS Moattama
- Aung Zeya-class frigate
- Kyan Sittha-class frigate
- Anawrahta-class corvette
- Inlay-class Offshore Patrol Vessel
- 5-Series class : Fast Attack Craft

== Publications ==
- Colledge, J. J.; Warlow, Ben (2006) [1969]. Ships of the Royal Navy: The Complete Record of All Fighting Ships of the Royal Navy from the 15th Century to the Present (3rd Rev ed.). London: Chatham Publishing. ISBN 978-1-86176-281-8. OCLC 67375475.
