= Nawarat-class corvette =

Class of corvettes of Myanmar Navy

Class overview
- Name: Nawarat class
- Builders: Dawbon Government Dockyard, Yangon
- Operators: Myanmar Navy
- Succeeded by: Anawrahta-class corvette
- Built: 1960 - 1961
- In commission: October 1960 - 1990
- Planned: 2
- Completed: 2
- Retired: 2

General characteristics
- Type: Corvette, River gunboat
- Displacement: 410ton
- Length: 50 m (160 ft)
- Propulsion: 2 × Paxman Ricardo Turbo Charge Diesel Engines
- Speed: Between 12 kn (22 km/h) and 14 kn (26 km/h)
- Sensors & processing systems: 2 × navigation radars
- Armament: 1 × 25-pounder gun; 1 × Bofors 40 mm gun; 2 × Oerlikon 20 mm cannons
- Notes: UMS Nawarat (501) is the first indigenous corvette of Myanmar Navy

The Nawarat-class corvette (also N-class corvette) is a class of corvettes which was operated by the Myanmar Navy. The lead ship of the class is UMS Nawarat (501) and it was commissioned in October 1960. The second ship, UMS Nagakyay (502) was commissioned in December 1961. Both of them are built at the Dawbon Government Shipyard, Yangon, with Yugoslavian assistance.

In spite of their size, both ships were used primarily for river patrols and rarely ventured out to sea. They were each armed with one ex-Army 25-pounder field gun and a Bofors 40 mm gun purchased from Sweden and two Oerlikon 20 mm cannons which were fitted on each side of the ship.

== Ships of the class ==
Name	Pennant	Builder	Launched	Commissioned	Decommissioned	Homeport
Nawarat	501	Dawbon Government Dockyard	26 March 1960	October 1960	1990	
Nagakyay	502	Dawbon Government Dockyard	3 December 1960	December 1961	1990	
