= Anawrahta-class corvette =

Warships operated by the Myanmar Navy

Class overview
- Builders: Myanmar Naval Dockyard
- Operators: Myanmar Navy
- Preceded by: Nawarat-class corvette (1960)
- Built: 1996–2016
- In commission: 2001–2016
- Planned: 3
- Completed: 3
- Active: UMS Anawrahta (771); UMS Bayinnaung (772); UMS Tabinshwehti (773)

General characteristics
- Type: Light Frigate(Guided-Missile Corvette)
- Displacement: 1,105 ton
- Length: 77 m (253 ft)
- Propulsion: diesel
- Speed: 26 knots
- Sensors & processing systems: UMS Anawrahta (771) & UMS Bayinnaung (772); 1 x Type 352 Radar (Square Tie); 1 x Unknown Surveillance Radar; 2 x Furuno Navigation Radars; UMS Tabinshwehti (773); 1 x BEL RAWL-02 Mk II L-band 2D search radar (222.2km); 1 x Chinese Type 362 missile-targeting radar (120km); 1 x Type 347G fire control radars; 2 x Furuno Navigation Radars; 1 x Unknown Sensor; 1 x BEL HMS-X hull-mounted sonar
- Electronic warfare & decoys: UMS Anawrahta (771) & UMS Bayinnaung (772); 2 x Mirage NRJ-5 Electronic Countmeasure System (Fitted in 2014); 2 x Dagaie missile decoy launcher(Fitted in 2014); UMS Tabinshwehti (773); 2 x Mirage NRJ-5 Electronic Countmeasure System; 2 x Dagaie missile decoy launcher; 4 x Unknown Decoy Launcher (Chaff and Flare)
- Armament: UMS Anawrahta (771) & UMS Bayinnaung (772); 1 × OTO Melara 76mm naval gun; 1 × Type 69/AK-230 twin-barrel 30 mm CIWS gun; 2 × Type 58/ZPU 2 Anti-aircraft Gun; 6 × SA-N-5 SAM (reloadable); 4 × C-802 anti-ship missiles; 2 × RBU-1200 or Type 81 ASW rocket launchers; 2 x Large Depth Charge (LDC) throwers; 2 x QJG-02G 14.5 mm AA guns; UMS Tabinshwehti (773); 1 × OTO Melara 76mm naval gun(fitted in the stealth copula); 2 x NG-18 30 mm CIWS; 2 x 14.5 mm Gantling Guns; 4 × C-802 anti-ship missiles; 6 × SA-N-5 SAM (reloadable); 2 x tripletubes torpedo launchers for Shyena Torpedoes; 2 × RBU-1200 or Type 81 ASW rocket launchers; 2 x Large Depth Charge (LDC) throwers; 2 x M2 Browning Heavy Machine Guns
- Aircraft carried: 1 x Schiebel Camcopter S-100 UAV; 1 x Mil Mi-2 Helicopter
- Aviation facilities: 771 and 772 each have a helicopter decks but without any hangars. 773 comes with a helicopter deck and a hangar.

The Anawrahta class corvette is a class of corvettes operated by the Myanmar Navy. The UMS Anawrahta (771) was commissioned in 2001. The ship was built locally with Chinese assistance. The Anawrahta class corvette is equipped with various electronic suites and weaponry systems from China, Israel and Russia. The lead ship of the class is named after King Anawrahta, the founder of the Pagan Empire of Myanmar (Burma).

The second ship, 772, named after King Bayinnaung, was commissioned in 2003. The Myanmar Navy launched another stealth corvette UMS Tabinshwehti (773) in November 2014. (Note: The 773 is treated as a separate class, as it has stealth shaping and helicopter hangar.)

== Ships of the class ==
Photo	Name	Pennant	Builder	Commissioned	Decommissioned	Homeport
	Anawrahta	771	Myanmar Naval Dockyard	2001		
	Bayint Naung	772	Myanmar Naval Dockyard	2003		
	Tabinshwehti	773	Myanmar Naval Dockyard	24 December 2016		

== See also ==
- UBS Mayu
- Aung Zeya-class frigate
- Kyan Sittha-class frigate
- UMS Moattama
- Inlay-class Offshore Patrol Vessel
- 5-Series class : Fast Attack Craft
