= 5-Series-class fast attack craft =

Ships of the Myanmar Navy

Class overview
- Builders: Myanmar Naval Dockyard
- Operators: Myanmar Navy
- Succeeded by: 49m Stealth FAC (M)
- Built: 1996–2013
- In commission: Hull no: 551–555 (1996); Hull no: 556–558 (2004); Hull no: 559–560 (2005); Hull no: 561–562 (2008); Hull no: 563–570 (2013–2014)
- Completed: 20
- Active: 20

General characteristics
- Type: Missile boat (556,557,558,561 and 562); Gunboat (others)
- Displacement: 350 tons (for 551–555)
- Length: 47 m (154 ft) for hull numbers 551-555,559 and 560.; 56 m (184 ft) for hull numbers 556,557,558,561-570.
- Beam: 10 m (33 ft)
- Speed: Between 25 kn (46 km/h) and 30 kn (56 km/h)
- Range: 1,800 mi (2,900 km) at the cruising speed
- Sensors & processing systems: 551, 552, 553, 554, 555, 559, 560; 2 x Furuno navigation radars; 1 x Rice Lamp fire-control radar(for 553,554 and 555); 1 x electro-optic fire-control system(for 559 and 560); 556, 557, 558, 561, 562; 1 x MR-36A surface search radar(with Magnetron transmitters); 1 x MR-34T fire-control radar; 1 x Furuno navigation radar; 2 x Kolonka optical director; 563, 564, 565, 566, 567, 568, 569, 570; 1 x MR-36A surface search radar(with Magnetron transmitters); 1 x Furuno navigation radar
- Electronic warfare & decoys: 556,557,558,561 and 562; 1 x NRJ-5A ECM/ESM system; 2 x Mirage NRJ-5 ECM/ESM system; 4 x Type-A FL-NA flare catridge magazines for various chaff and flare types
- Armament: 551 and 552; 1 x Chinese Type-66 57 mm twin AA gun; 1 x 2M-3M 26 mm AA gun; 2 x ZPU-1 14.5 mm guns; 553,554 and 555; 2 x Type 76 twin 37 mm naval gun; 1 x 2M-3M 25mm twin gun; 2 x ZPU-1 14.5 mm guns; 556,557 and 558; 2 x NG-18 30 mm CIWS Gun; 2 x locally-made Type-91 quad remote-controlled guns; 4 x C-802 surface-to-surface missiles; 4 x turret mounted Igla SAM; 2 x license built QJG-02G 14.5 mm heavy machine guns; 559 and 560; 2 x CRN-91(Medak) 30mm single guns (for 559 and 560); 1 x 2M-3M 26 mm AA gun; 2 x license built QJG-02G 14.5 mm heavy machine guns; 561 and 562; 2 x NG-18 30 mm CIWS Gun; 2 x locally-made Type-91 quad remote-controlled guns; 2 x C-802 surface-to-surface missiles; 4 x turret mounted Igla SAM; 2 x license built QJG-02G 14.5 mm heavy machine guns; 563,564,565,566,567,568,569 and 570; 2 x locally-made 37-40 mm naval guns (possibly based on Chinese Type-76A); 2 x locally-made Type-91 quad remote-controlled guns; 2 x license built QJG-02G 14.5 mm heavy machine guns; 4 x turret mounted Igla SAM
- Notes: 556 is the first locally-made missile boat.

The 5-Series class is a class of fast attack craft built by the Myanmar Navy between 1996 and 2012. There are twenty ships in this class and the designs and armaments of the ships are different based on their batches and ship types. Ships of the 5-series class are divided into FAC (Missile)s and FAC (Gun)s.

== History ==
The first batch with five FAC(Gun)s (551,552,553,554 and 555) entered service in 1996. The second batch with three FAC(Missile)s (556,557 and 558) were commissioned in 2004.

The third batch with two FAC(Gun)s (559 and 560) were commissioned in 2005. The fourth batch with two FAC(Missile)s (561 and 562) were commissioned in 2008 and the last batch with seven FAC(Gun)s (563,564,565,566,567,568,569 and 570) were commissioned between 2012 and 2013.

== Design ==
In 2013, Myanmar Navy also started the modernization of 5-series class fast attack crafts with more advanced weapons, such as fitting the FAC(Gun)s with Igla(SA-24) turrets and substituting the main guns of FAC(Missile)s with NG-18 30mm close-in weapon systems.

== Ships of the class ==
Pennant	Builder	Commissioned	Homeport
551	Myanmar Navy Dockyard	1996	
552	Myanmar Navy Dockyard	1996	
553	Myanmar Navy Dockyard	1996	
554	Myanmar Navy Dockyard	1996	
555	Myanmar Navy Dockyard	1996	
556	Myanmar Navy Dockyard	2004	Thanlyin
557	Myanmar Navy Dockyard	2004	Thanlyin
558	Myanmar Navy Dockyard	2004	Thanlyin
559	Myanmar Navy Dockyard	2005	
560	Myanmar Navy Dockyard	2005	
561	Myanmar Navy Dockyard	2008	Thanlyin
562	Myanmar Navy Dockyard	2008	Thanlyin
563	Myanmar Navy Dockyard	2013	
564	Myanmar Navy Dockyard	2013	
565	Myanmar Navy Dockyard	2013	
566	Myanmar Navy Dockyard	2013	
567	Myanmar Navy Dockyard	2013	
568	Myanmar Navy Dockyard	2013	
569	Myanmar Navy Dockyard	2013	
570	Myanmar Navy Dockyard	2013	

== See also ==
- UMS Minye Theinkhathu
- UBS Mayu
- Aung Zeya-class frigate
- Kyan Sittha-class frigate
- Anawrahta-class corvette
- Inlay-class offshore patrol vessel
- 49m Stealth Fast Attack Craft
- UMS Moattama
