= RBU-1200 =

Russian anti submarine rocket launcher

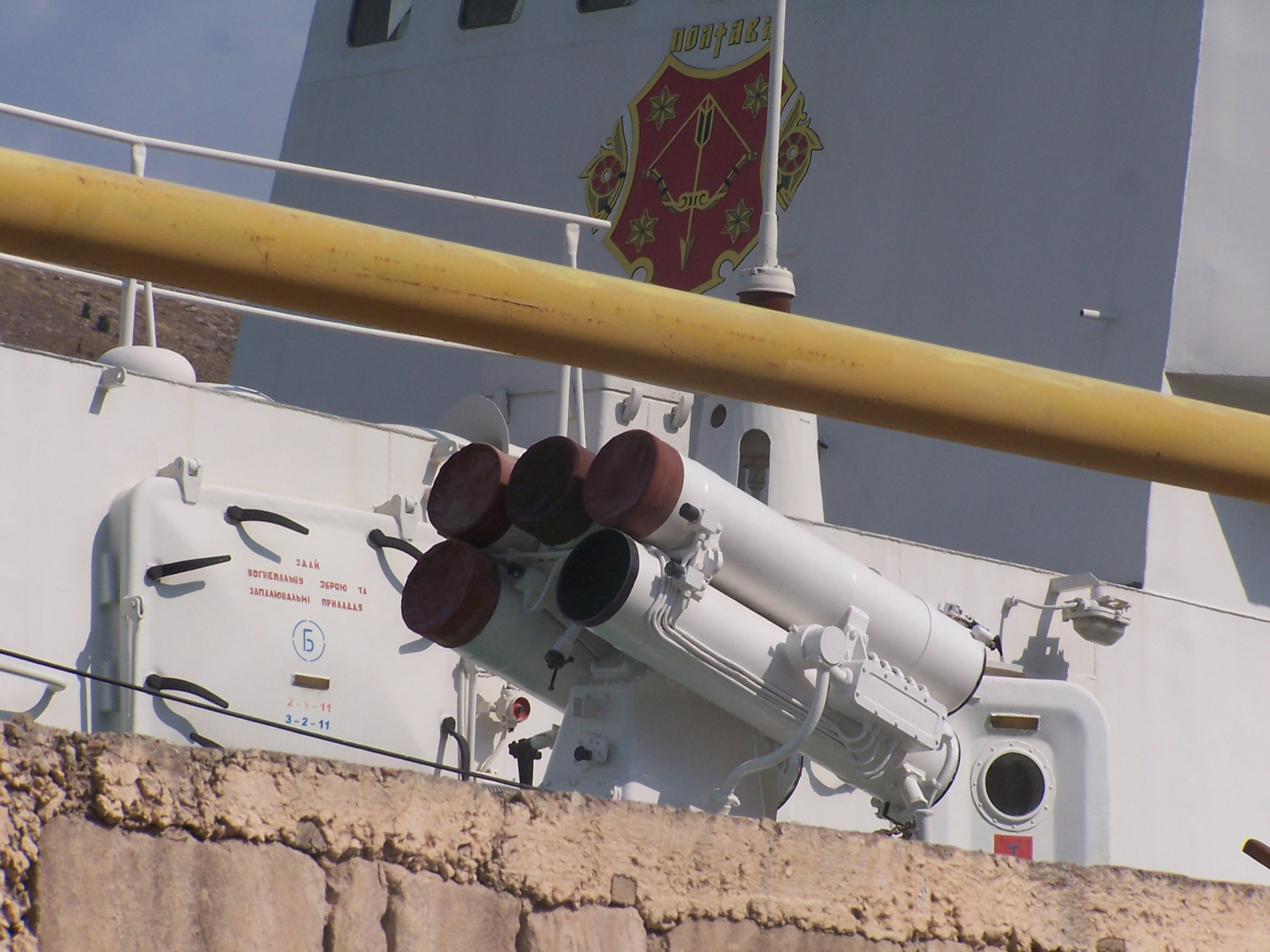
RBU-1200 on a Pauk-class corvette

The RBU-1200 (Russian: Реактивно-Бомбовая Установка, Reaktivno-Bombovaja Ustanovka; reaction engine-bomb installation & Смерч; waterspout) is an anti-submarine rocket launcher. The weapon system is remotely similar to the British Hedgehog anti submarine mortar launcher from the Second World War.

== Description ==
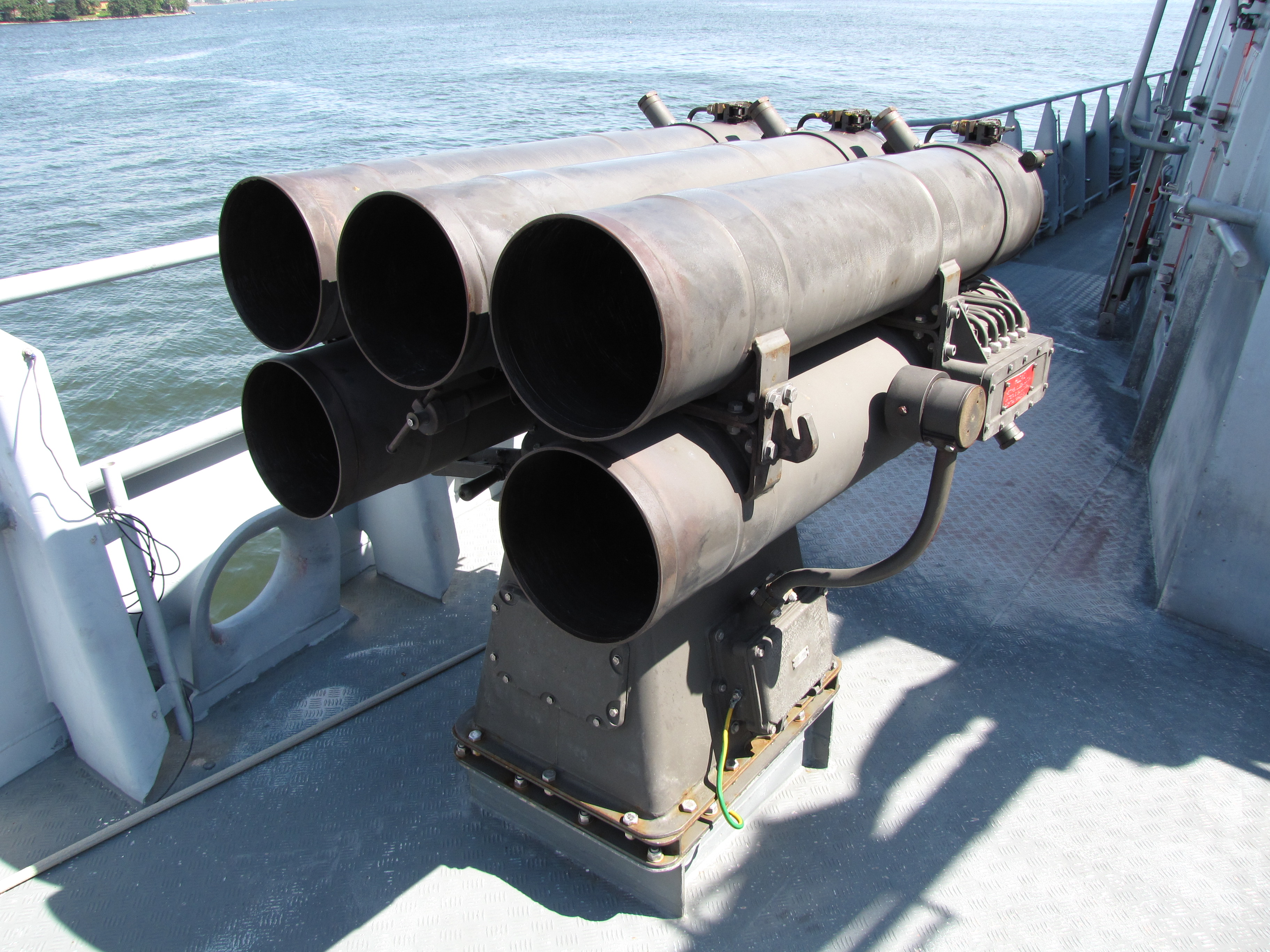
RBU-1200 anti-submarine rocket launcher on the bow of the Finnish patrol craft Kurki (51).

The RBU-1200 system was developed in 1955 to provide anti-submarine capability against submarines and torpedoes by surface vessels. In order to allow installation on small warships the design was made very lightweight.

The RBU-1200 system has five tubes with rocket-propelled depth bombs per each launcher. Reloading is performed manually. The launcher cannot be swiveled horizontally, but rather has to be aimed by turning the entire warship, which is a serious disadvantage of the weapon system and limits its flexibility.

The system is controlled by a PUS-B "Uragan" fire control system.

The system uses RGB-12 rocket-propelled depth bombs, which are fitted with contact fuzes. The projectile is propelled by a solid rocket fuel motor initially, and for the rest of the flight it follows a ballistic arc. The effective range of the system extends from 400 to 1200 meters. The contact fuze K-3 / K-3M, or combined contact-delay fuze KDV are used as a detonators. K-3 / K-3M fuze detonates the warhead if a target is hit directly or if the projectile sinks to the bottom. The KDV fuze besides activating on impact on the target (or bottom) at the depths of 25–330 meters can also be set to activate upon reaching a specified depth in the range of 10–330 meters.

== Technical data ==
=== Launcher ===
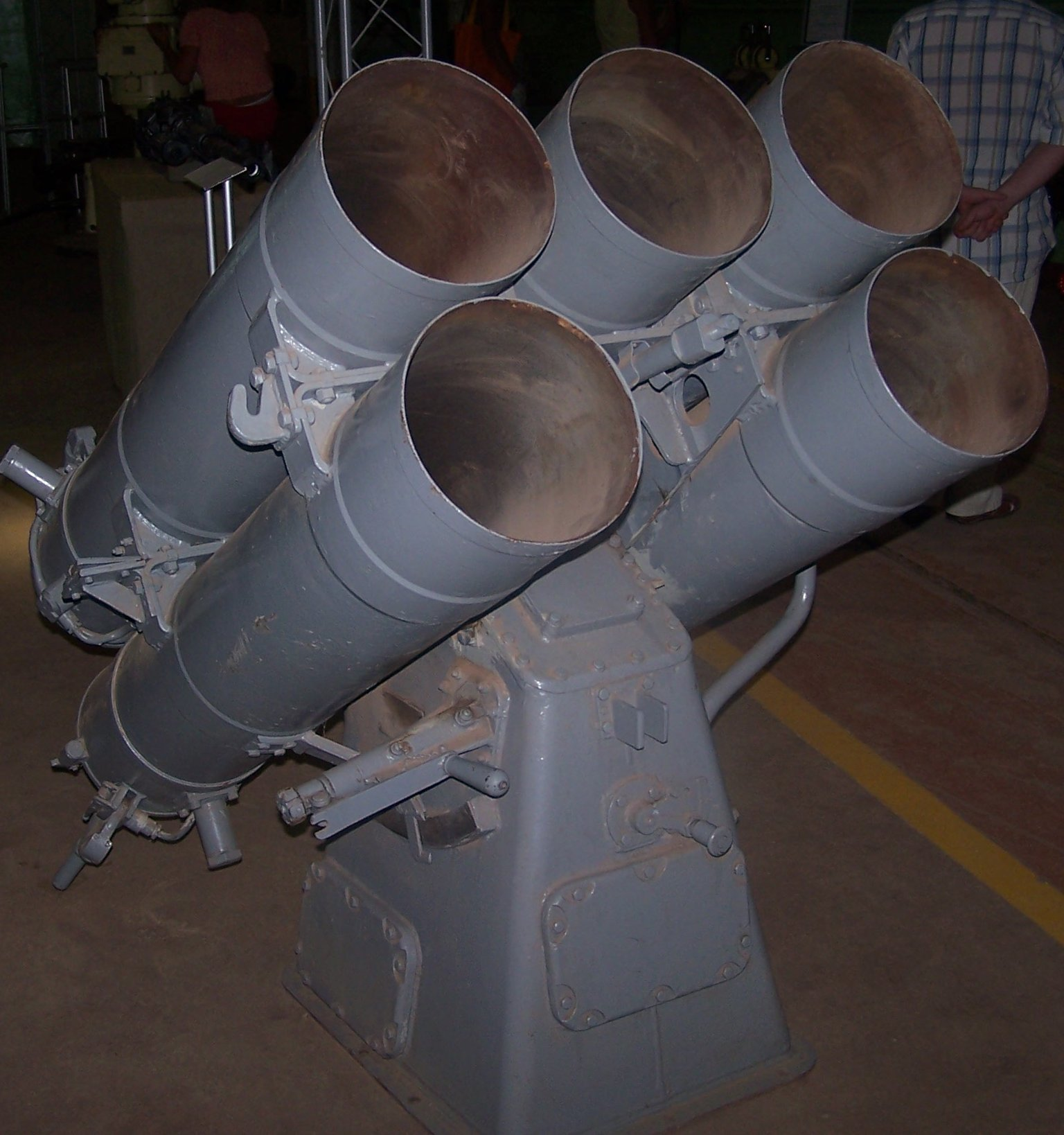
RBU 1200 launchers in Naval museum complex Balaklava

- Weight: 620 kg (empty)
- Length: 1.38 m
- Height: 1.1 m
- Width: 1,115 m
- Elevation: 0 to 51 °
- Traverse: 0°

=== RGB-12 projectile ===
- Weight: 73 kg
- Warhead: 30 kg
- Diameter: 251.7 mm
- Length: 1.24 m
- Range: 400 m to 1200 m
- Depth: up to 350 m
- Rate of descent: 6.25 m/s

== Operators ==
Ship classes fitted with RBU-1200 (list not complete):

- Albanian Naval Force
  - Kronshtadt-class submarine chaser
- Bangladesh Navy
  - Haizhui-class submarine chaser
  - Type 037 submarine chaser
  - Type 053H1 frigate
  - Type 053H2 frigate
- People's Liberation Army Navy
  - Type 051 destroyer
  - Type 052 destroyer
  - Type 053H1 frigate
- Bulgarian Navy
  - Kronshtadt-class submarine chaser
  - Pauk-class corvette
- Cuban Revolutionary Navy
  - Pauk-class corvette
  - Kronshtadt-class submarine chaser
- Egyptian Navy
- Finnish Navy
  - Hämeenmaa-class minelayer
  - Kiisla-class patrol boat
  - Turunmaa-class gunboat
- Indonesian Navy
  - Kronshtadt-class submarine chaser
- Indian Navy
  - Abhay-class corvette
- Libyan Navy
  - Natya-class minesweeper
- Myanmar Navy
  - Aung Zeya-class frigate
  - Kyan Sittha-class frigate
  - Type 053H1 frigate
  - Anawrahta-class corvette
  - Yan Nyein Aung-class submarine chaser
  - Hainan-class submarine chaser
- Polish Navy
  - Kronshtadt-class submarine chaser
- Romanian Naval Forces
  - Kronshtadt-class submarine chaser
- Soviet Navy
  Russian Navy
  - Project 1241.2 (Pauk class)
  - Project 266M (Natya class)
  - Kronshtadt-class submarine chaser
- Syrian Navy
  - Natya-class minesweeper
- Vietnam People's Navy
  Vietnam People's Ground Force
  - Installed on Vietnam People's Navy's decommissioned Project 201 subchasers. Usable systems are transferred to the Vietnam People's Ground Force for ground-attacking roles.
    Refurbishing, upgrading and resembling projects are reported.
- Volksmarine
  - Project 12 (Hai-class)

== See also ==
- RBU-1000
- RBU-2500
- RBU-6000
- RBU-12000
