= Thalun-class frigate =

Multipurpose Guided Missile Frigate built by Myanmar Navy

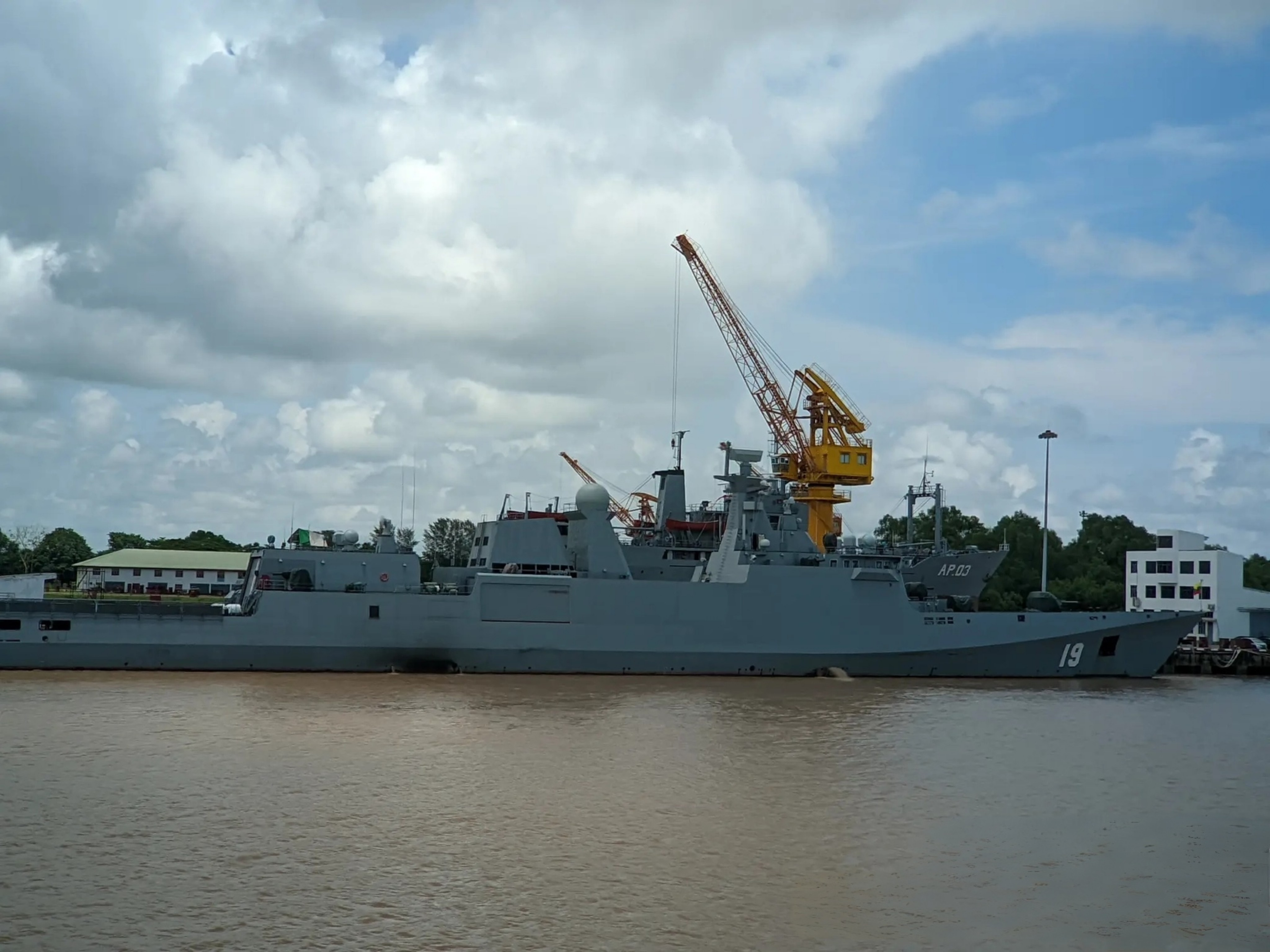
- UMS King Thalun at the Thanlyin Naval Dockyard

Class overview
- Builders: Myanmar Naval Dockyard
- Operators: Myanmar Navy
- Preceded by: Kyan Sittha-class frigate
- Built: 23 March 2017
- In commission: March 9, 2026
- Completed: 1
- Active: 1

General characteristics
- Type: Multi-purpose guided missile frigate
- Displacement: 3,500 ton
- Length: 135 m (442 ft 11 in)
- Beam: 14.5 m (47 ft 7 in)
- Draft: 4.1 m (13 ft 5 in)
- Propulsion: CODOG propulsion
- Speed: 30 knots (56 km/h; 35 mph)
- Armament: 1 × H/PJ-26 76mm naval gun; 16 VLS cells for anti-aircraft missile; 3 x Type 730B 30 mm CIWS 1 forward, 2 aft, port/starboard; 2 x 14.5 mm DI RCWS; 8 x unknown anti-ship missile; 2 x triple torpedo launchers for Shyena torpedoes; 2 x RBU-6000 anti-submarine rocket launchers; 2 x Large Depth Charge (LDC) throwers; 2 x M2 Browning Heavy Machine Guns
- Aircraft carried: 1 x Schiebel Camcopter S-100 UAV; 1 x Ka-28
- Aviation facilities: Helicopter deck and enclosed hangar

The Thalun-class frigate is a class of guided missile stealth frigates operated by the Myanmar Navy. It is the first multi-purpose guided missile frigate class built by the Myanmar Navy. UMS King Thalun (19) is the lead ship of this class. The lead ship of the class is named after Thalun, king of Toungoo dynasty of Myanmar (Burma).

The building of the first frigate of this class, UMS King Thalun (19) started on 23 March 2017 and launched on 24 December 2024 at 77th Navy Anniversary Day Ceremony.

== Design and improvements ==
The Thalun-class frigate is built with 34 main blocks and 15 superstructures. The warship is similar to the previously built UMS King Sin Phyu Shin, starting from Mast No. 2, it is built with a slab sided and lower radar cross section design. And the ship's operational range and maneuverability are designed to be high. Unlike the previous frigates, the Thalun-class frigate is not only designed for search and rescue, but also for a multi-purpose role. To that end, improvements have been made to fill areas such as air defense power that the previous ships needed, and to have better radar and sensors and the better operational range.

== Ships of the class ==
Photo	Name	Pennant	Builder	Launched	Commissioned	Homeport
	King Thalun	19	Myanmar Naval Dockyard	24 December 2024	09, March 2026	Yangon
