= 49m stealth fast attack craft =

Ship class

Class overview
- Builders: Myanmar Naval Dockyard
- Operators: Myanmar Navy
- Preceded by: 5-Series class : Fast Attack Craft
- Succeeded by: Yan Nyein Aung-class submarine chaser
- Built: 2013–present
- In commission: 491 (2015), 492 (2020)
- Planned: 10
- Completed: 2
- Active: 2

General characteristics
- Type: FAC (Missile)
- Length: 49 m (161 ft)
- Beam: 7.4 m (24 ft)
- Draft: 1.85 m (6 ft 1 in)
- Propulsion: (491); 4 x diesel engines; (492); 3 x diesel engines supported by three waterjet propulsors
- Speed: 30 kn (56 km/h)
- Range: 1,800 mi (2,900 km) at cruising speed
- Sensors & processing systems: 1 x MR-36A 3D surface-search radar(491 is with Magnetron transmitter.492 is with Solid-state transmitter.); 1 x MR-34T(Type-344) Fire control radar; 2 x Furuno navigation radars
- Electronic warfare & decoys: 491; 1 x NRJ-5A ECM and ELINT system; 4 x Type-A FL-NA flare catridge magazines for various chaff and flare types; 492; 4 x NRJ-5A Type-C ECM and ELINT systems (fitted in four faces of radar tower); 4 x Type-A FL-NA flare catridge magazines for various chaff and flare types
- Armament: 1 x NG-18 6-barrel 30 mm CIWS; 2 x locally made Type-91 quadruple remote-controlled AA guns; 4 x C-802 Anti-ship missiles (fitted on the 491); 4 x C-802A Anti-ship missiles (fitted on the 492); 2 x Igla SAM launchers; 2 x locally made MA-16 heavy machine guns
- Notes: The hull design of 492 is different from that of the 491. The superstructure of 492 was constructed with aluminium, and the hull with steel. The anti-ship missiles in use are the C-802A instead of the C-802.

The 49m stealth fast attack craft (Project-PB-049) are a class of locally made fast attack craft of the Myanmar Navy. Unlike the previous class of 5-series class fast attack craft, the design of the 49m stealth fast attack craft utilizes stealth technology.

== History ==
The hull number 491 is the lead ship of this class, and it was completed in 2013. The second ship 492 was completed in 2019, and commissioned on 24 December 2020.

== Design ==
The 492 is fitted with three waterjet propulsers. The hull design and armaments are slightly altered.

== Ships of the class ==
Photo	Pennant	Builder	Built	Commissioned	Homeport	Note
	491	Myanmar Naval Dockyard	2013	24 December 2012	Thanlyin	
	492	Myanmar Naval Dockyard	2018	24 December 2020	Thanlyin	Hull design slightly altered
