= UMS Moattama =

UMS Moattama Myanmar Navy

History

Myanmar
- Name: Moattama
- Namesake: Gulf of Martaban
- Ordered: 2018
- Builder: Dae Sun Shipbuilding, South Korea
- Launched: July 2019
- Commissioned: 24 December 2019
- Identification: Hull number: 1501
- Status: In active service

General characteristics
- Class & type: Makassar-class landing platform dock
- Displacement: Standard: 12,300 tons; Full load: 15,900 tons
- Length: 125 m (410 ft 1 in) (LOA); 109.2 m (358 ft 3 in) (LPP)
- Beam: 22 m (72 ft 2 in)
- Draft: 5 m (16 ft 5 in)
- Decks: tank deck: 6.7 m (22 ft 0 in); truck deck: 11.3 m (37 ft 1 in)
- Installed power: 1 x MAN D2842 LE301 diesel generator
- Propulsion: Combined diesel and diesel (CODAD) propulsion, 2 shafts; MAN B&W 8L28/32A diesel rated at 1,988 kilowatts (2,666 bhp) at 775 RPM
- Speed: Maximum: 16 knots (30 km/h; 18 mph); Operational:14 knots (26 km/h; 16 mph); Cruising:13 knots (24 km/h; 15 mph)
- Range: 9,360 nmi (17,330 km; 10,770 mi)
- Endurance: 30 days
- Boats & landing craft carried: 2 x 23 m (75 ft 6 in) LCU (or) LCM at floodable well decks; 4 × 8.5 m (27 ft 11 in) RHIB
- Capacity: 22 x trucks or 25 x tanks(10 addition trucks or tanks can use if necessary)
- Troops: 520 troops
- Complement: 103
- Sensors & processing systems: Furuno X-band & S-band navigation radars; Combat management system
- Armament: 2 x 14.5 mm gatling guns; 2 x QJG-02G 14.5 mm heavy machine guns
- Aircraft carried: 2 × Eurocopter AS365 Dauphin or 2 x Mil Mi-17 (Up to 3 helicopters)
- Aviation facilities: Hangar for 1 medium (10-ton) helicopters; Flight deck for 2 medium (10-ton) helicopters
- Notes: Flagship of Myanmar Navy, used as a multi-purpose support vessel and command Ship

UMS Moattama (1501) also UMS Mottama (Burmese: မုတ္တမ) is the first landing platform dock (LPD) and current flagship of the Myanmar Navy. Like other LPDs, Moattama is designed for amphibious operations, transportation of personnel as well as disaster relief and humanitarian assistance. It has a well deck and two helicopter landing spots and hangar. Moattama was based on the Makassar class design used by Daesun Shipbuilding & Engineering Co. in Korea for the LPDs ordered by Indonesia and Peru. It is 125 metres (410 ft 1 in) long and a beam of 22 metres (72 ft 2 in). It is also expected to be able to accommodate at least two Mi-17 medium helicopters in its flight deck.

Myanmar joins other navies in the ASEAN region that operate LPD-type ships including Indonesia and the Philippines which operate ships based on the Makassar class, and Singapore and Thailand which both operate ships based on the Endurance-class design.

== See also ==
- Aung Zeya-class frigate
- Kyan Sittha-class frigate
- Anawrahta-class corvette
- Inlay-class offshore patrol vessel
- 5-Series class : Fast Attack Craft
