= Yan Nyein Aung-class submarine chaser =

Stealth submarine chaser class of the Myanmar Navy

Class overview
- Builders: Thanlyin Naval Dockyard
- Operators: Myanmar Navy
- Preceded by: 49m Stealth FAC(M) class
- Built: March 2016-Present
- In commission: 24 December 2020-present
- Planned: 10
- Completed: 2
- Active: 2

General characteristics
- Type: Stealth submarine chaser/ASW corvette
- Displacement: 600 ton
- Length: 63 m (207 ft)
- Beam: 7.5 m (25 ft)
- Draft: 1.85 m (6 ft 1 in)
- Propulsion: 3 x diesel engines supported by three water jet propulsers
- Speed: 35 knots (65 km/h; 40 mph)
- Range: 1,800 nmi (3,300 km) at the 20 knots (37 km/h; 23 mph)
- Complement: 18
- Sensors & processing systems: 1 x MR-36A surface search radar (planned); 2 x Furuno navigation radar; 1 x HUMSA Blackfish-911 hull-mounted sonar
- Electronic warfare & decoys: 4 x Type-A FL-NA flare catridge magazines for various chaff and flare types
- Armament: 1 × Chinese Type-66 57 mm (2.2 in) twin AA guns; 2 × 2M-3M 25 mm (0.98 in) twin AA guns; 2 x licensed built QJG-02G 14.5 mm AA guns; 2 x triple-tubes torpedo launchers for 12 Shyena torpedoes (6 in the tubes and 6 on the racks); 2 × RBU-1200 ASW rocket launchers; 2 × DC (Depth Charge) throwers; naval mines
- Notes: The hulls of the ships are constructed with Steel and their superstructures with Aluminium to reduce the displacement of the ships.

The Yan Nyein Aung-class submarine chaser (Project PGG 063), also known as 63m stealth submarine chaser, is the first indigenous stealth submarine chaser class of the Myanmar Navy. The lead ship of the class is UMS Yan Nyein Aung (443) and she was commissioned with UMS Yan Ye Aung (446) on 24 December 2020. This class is intended to replace the ten old Hainan-class submarine chasers.

== History ==
Project PGG 063 was approved at the 31st council meeting of Myanmar Navy.

The construction of the lead ship, UMS Yan Nyein Aung started in March 2016 and she was launched in March 2019. UMS Yan Nyein Aung (443) was commissioned with UMS Yan Ye Aung (446) on 24 December 2020.

During the inauguration ceremony, the event was attended by Commander-in-Chief of the Myanmar Armed Forces Senior General Min Aung Hlaing, Russian Ambassador to Myanmar H.E.Dr. Nikolay A. LISTOPADOV; Indian Ambassador to Myanmar H.E. Mr. Saurabh Kumar; Senior military officers from the Office of the Commander-in-Chief; Indian Navy Eastern Naval Command Headquarters and Head of Head Admiral Atul Kumar Jain; Commander, Yangon Division Military Headquarters.

== Design ==
The hulls of the ships are constructed of steel and their superstructures of aluminium to reduce the ship's displacement. The uniqueness of this class is that the ships are equipped with three waterjet propulsers to secretly track and attack submarines and to improve maneuverability by reducing noise produced from the engines and propellers.

The basic purpose of this class is to quietly track and destroy submarines in the country's exclusive economic zone. They can also carry out various constabulary tasks within country's maritime boundary against maritime terrorism, environmental pollution, smuggling and can also be deployed for search and rescue operations and transportation of aids when necessary.

== Armament ==
The ships of this class are equipped with one Type-66 57 mm semi-automatic twin gun, two 2M-3M 25 mm twin guns and two locally made QJG-02G 14.5 mm guns for anti-aircraft warfare. Armament for air defense role may seem weak, but this category does not need much because this class focuses only on the anti-submarine role.

The ships are also equipped with two triple torpedo launchers for Shyena torpedoes, two RBU-1200 ASW rocket launchers and two LDC (large depth charge) throwers and naval mines as the anti-submarine weapons (ASW).

== Ships of the class ==
Photo	Name	Project Number	Pennant	Builder	Commissioned	Homeport
	Yan Nyein Aung	Project PGG 063 A-1	443	Thanlyin Naval Dockyard (Myanmar Navy)	24 December 2020	
	Yan Ye Aung	Project PGG 063 A-2	446	Thanlyin Naval Dockyard (Myanmar Navy)	24 December 2020	
