= Aung Zeya-class frigate =

Myanmar Navy ship

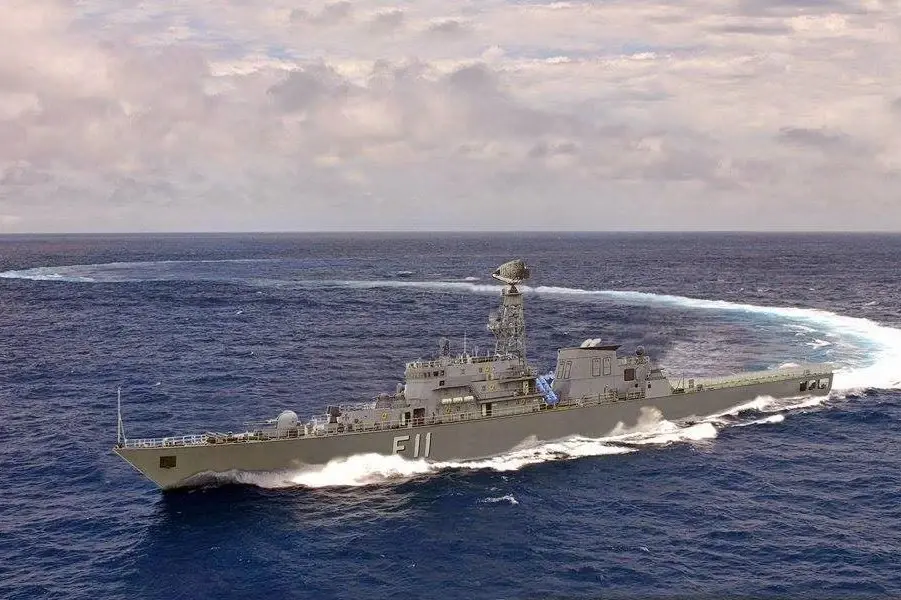
- UMS King Aung Zeya at IFR-26

Class overview
- Builders: Myanmar Naval Dockyard
- Operators: Myanmar Navy
- Preceded by: UBS Mayu
- Succeeded by: Kyan Sittha-class frigate
- Cost: US$ 200 M
- Built: 2008
- In commission: 2010–present
- Completed: 1
- Active: 1

General characteristics
- Type: Guided missile frigate
- Displacement: 2,500 ton (estimated)
- Length: 108 m (354 ft 4 in)
- Propulsion: CODAD, 4 × Shaanxi 16 PA6 STC diesels, 5700 kW (7600+ hp @ 1084 rpm) each
- Speed: 30 knots (56 km/h; 35 mph) estimated
- Range: 3,800 mi (6,100 km) estimated
- Sensors & processing systems: BEL RAWL-02 Mk II L-band 2D search radar; Type 347G 76 mm gun fire control radar; 2 × Racal RM-1290 navigation radars, I-band; SNTI-240 SATCOM; BEL HMS- X2 hull mounted sonar
- Electronic warfare & decoys: Type 922-1 radar warning receiver; HZ-100 ECM & ELINT system
- Armament: 1 × OTO Melara 76mm/62cal naval gun; 4 × AK-630 6-barrel 30 mm CIWS guns; 2 x 14.5 mm Gatling Guns; 8 × Kumsong-3 anti-ship missiles; 6 × SA-N-5 surface to air missiles(reloadable); 2 x Triple torpedo launchers for 324 mm YU-7 ASW torpedoes; 2 x Large Depth Charge(LDC) throwers; 2 x RBU-1200 Anti-submarine rocket launchers(total of 36 rockets in storage); 2 x M2 Browning Heavy Machine Guns
- Aircraft carried: 1 x Mil Mi-17
- Aviation facilities: Helicopter deck (no hangar)

The Aung Zeya-class frigate is a frigate operated by the Myanmar Navy. The lead ship of the class is named after Aung Zeya (Alaungpaya), the founder of Konbaung Dynasty of Myanmar. UMS Aung Zeya (F-11) is the first indigenous guided missile frigate of the Myanmar Navy.

As of 2021, the lead ship (F-11) is the only ship in this class. She participated at the International Fleet Review 2026 held in Visakapatnam, India.

== See also ==
- Kilo-class submarine
- Makassar-class landing platform dock
- UMS Moattama
- Anawrahta-class corvette
- Inlay-class offshore patrol vessel
- 5-Series-class fast attack craft
