= Inlay-class offshore patrol vessel =

Ship class of the Myanmar Navy

Inlay class
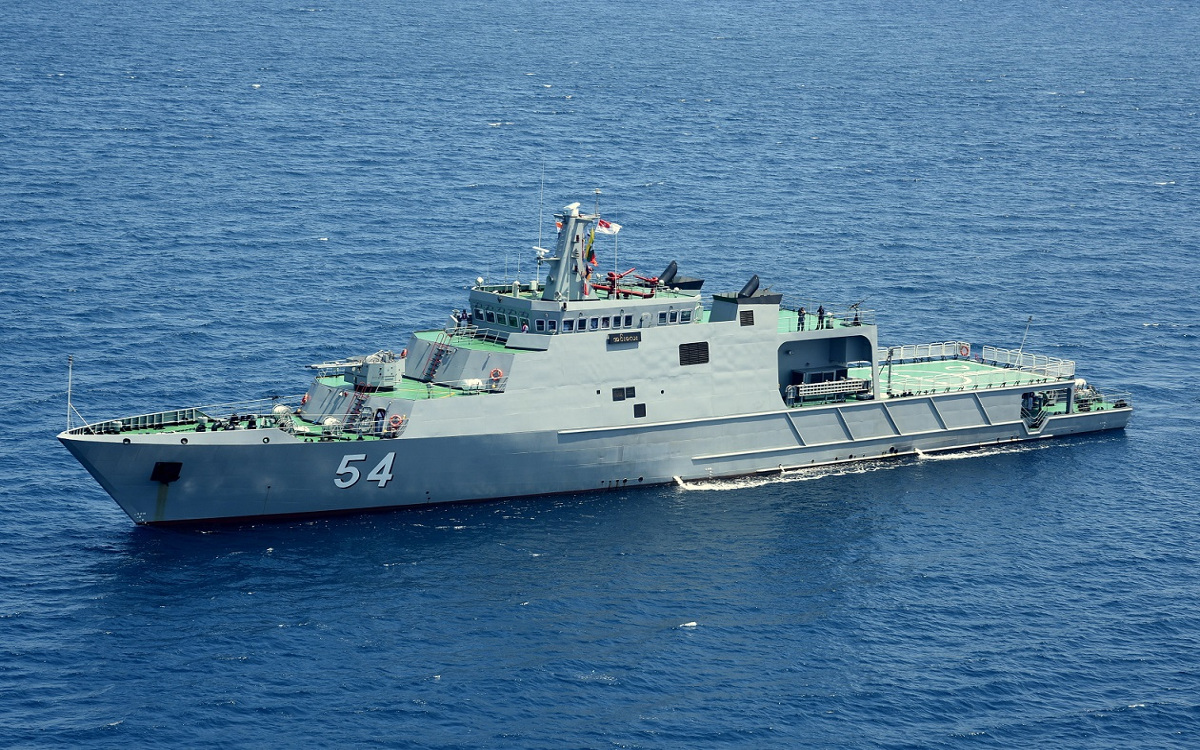
- UMS Inlay (54) of Myanmar Navy

Class overview
- Builders: Myanmar Naval Dockyard
- Operators: Myanmar Navy
- Built: 2013
- In commission: 24 December 2017
- Building: 0
- Completed: 2
- Active: 2

General characteristics
- Type: Offshore patrol vessel
- Displacement: 1,500 tons
- Length: 81 m (265 ft 9 in)
- Beam: 12.5 m (41 ft 0 in)
- Propulsion: CODAD Propulsion
- Speed: 20 knots (37 km/h; 23 mph) estimated
- Range: Unknown
- Sensors & processing systems: 1 x Unknown surface search radar; 2 x Furuno navigation radar
- Armament: 1 x Type-66/76 57 mm twin guns; 2 x M2 Browning Heavy Machine Guns
- Aircraft carried: 1 x Eurocopter AS365 Dauphin helicopter; 1 x Schiebel Camcopter S-100
- Aviation facilities: 17.5 m (57 ft)-long flight deck and has a single hangar.

The Inlay-class offshore patrol vessel is a class of offshore patrol vessel (OPV) operated by the Myanmar Navy. The lead ship of the class is UMS Inlay. UMS Inlay was built at Thanlyin Naval Dockyard near Yangon with the help of technical assistance and equipment provided by Singapore-based companies. Launched in late November 2015, Inlay was commissioned in December 2017. Subsequently, Inma was commissioned in December 2021.

== Design ==
The OPV is approximately 81 metres (265 ft 9 in) long with a beam of about 12.5 metres (41 ft 0 in) and is understood to displace at least 1,500 tons. It is powered by two diesel engines driving two propellers. The OPV is capable of operating a helicopter from its approximately 17.5-metre (57 ft)-long flight deck and has a single hangar. A stern ramp is fitted for a rigid-hulled inflatable boat. The armament comprises manually operated 57-millimetre (2.2 in) twin guns in Type 66 or 76 gun mount on the forecastle as well as two manually-operated heavy machine guns atop the hangar deck. Sensors include two Furuno navigation radars.

The Inlay will supplement the two remaining Danish-built Osprey-class OPVs in service.

== Ships of the class ==
Name	Pennant	Builder	Launched	Commissioned	Homeport
UMS Inlay	54	Myanmar Naval Dockyard	November 2015	24 December 2017	Thilawa Navy Shipyard
UMS Inma	53	Myanmar Naval Dockyard	2019	24 December 2021	Thilawa Navy Shipyard

== See also ==
- Aung Zeya-class frigate – Myanmar Navy ship
- Kyan Sittha-class frigate – Myanmar Stealth Frigate
- Anawrahta-class corvette – Warships operated by the Myanmar Navy
- UMS Moattama – UMS Moattama Myanmar Navy
- 5-Series-class fast attack craft – Ships of the Myanmar Navy
