= Kyan Sittha-class frigate =

Myanmar Stealth Frigate

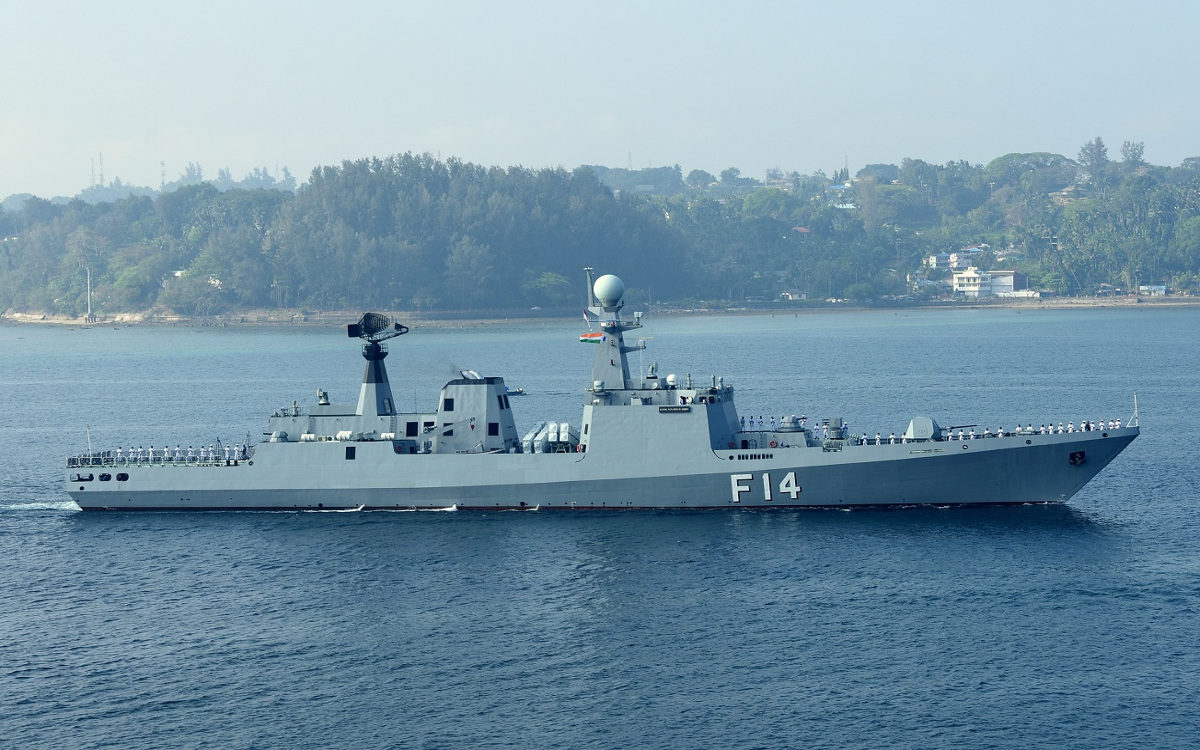
- Myanmar UMS King Sin Phyu Shin (F14) during Milan 2018 exercise

Class overview
- Builders: Myanmar Naval Dockyard
- Operators: Myanmar Navy
- Preceded by: Aung Zeya class
- Succeeded by: Thalun-class frigate
- Built: 2012
- In commission: 2014–present
- Completed: 2
- Active: 2

General characteristics
- Type: Guided missile stealth frigate
- Displacement: 3,000 ton
- Length: 108 m (354 ft 4 in)
- Beam: 13.5 m (44 ft 3 in)
- Propulsion: CODAD propulsion; 4 × Pielstick 16PA6STC at 5.1 MW (6,800 hp) (7600+ hp at 1084 rpm) each
- Speed: 30 knots (56 km/h; 35 mph) estimated
- Range: 4,000 nmi (7,400 km; 4,600 mi) at 18 kn (33 km/h; 21 mph); 8,025 nmi (14,862 km; 9,235 mi) at 12 kn (22 km/h; 14 mph)
- Sensors & processing systems: Surface search radars; 1 x MR-36A surface search radar(using Magnetron transmitters); 1 x BEL Revati Radar surface search radar(250 km); 1 x BEL RAWL-02 Mk-IIA L-band 2D surface search radar(222.2 km) (erstwhile); Fire control radars; 2 x MR-34T fire control radar; 1 x TFC-3 electro-optical fire-control director; Sonar; 1 x BEL HUMSA HMS-X hull-mounted sonar; Navigation radars; 1x Furuno FAR-2827W X-band navigation radar; 1x Furuno FAR-2837S S-band navigation radar; Satellite communication; SAILOR VSAT SATCOM; Others; 1 x Antenna for Camcopter
- Electronic warfare & decoys: 1 x Type-922-1 radar warning receiver; 2 x NRJ-5 ECM/ESM system; 1 x NRJ-5A ECM and ELINT system; 2 x Decoy System each system include eight Type-A FL-NA chaff and flare cartridge magazines (192 decoys) for various chaff and flare types; 4 x FL-NA flare cartridge magazines(30 flare launchers each)
- Armament: 1 × Oto Melara 76 mm naval gun; 3 x NG-18(H/PJ-13) 6-barrel 30 mm CIWS guns; 2 x 14.5 mm Gatling Guns; 8 x C-802 anti-ship missiles; 6 x turret-mounted Igla-S(SA-24) SAM(reloadable); 2 x triple torpedo launchers for Shyena torpedoes; 2 x RBU-1200 anti-submarine rocket launchers(total of 36 rockets in storage); 2 x Large Depth Charge (LDC) throwers; 2 x M2 Browning Heavy Machine Guns
- Aircraft carried: 1 x Schiebel Camcopter S-100 UAV; 1 x Eurocopter AS365 Dauphin
- Aviation facilities: Helicopter deck and enclosed hangar

The Kyan Sittha-class frigate (or Kyansitta or Kyan-Sit-Thar class) is a class of guided missile stealth frigates operated by the Myanmar Navy. UMS Kyansitta (F12) is the first Myanmar Navy frigate that has reduced radar cross section features on its design. The ship incorporates various electronic suite and weaponry system from India, China and Russia. The lead ship of the class is named after Kyansittha, king of Pagan Dynasty of Myanmar (Burma).

The first frigate (F12) was commissioned on 31 March 2014, two days after the launch of the second frigate UMS Sinphyushin (F14), which was named after Sinphyushin, king of Konbaung Dynasty of Myanmar.

== Ships of the class ==
Photo	Name	Pennant	Builder	Launched	Commissioned	Homeport
	Kyan Sitta (Note: Alternatively spelled Kyan-Sit-Thar and Kyansittha.)	F12	Myanmar Naval Dockyard	22 October 2012	31 March 2014	Yangon
	Sin Phyu Shin	F14	Myanmar Naval Dockyard	29 March 2014	24 December 2015	Yangon

== Gallery ==
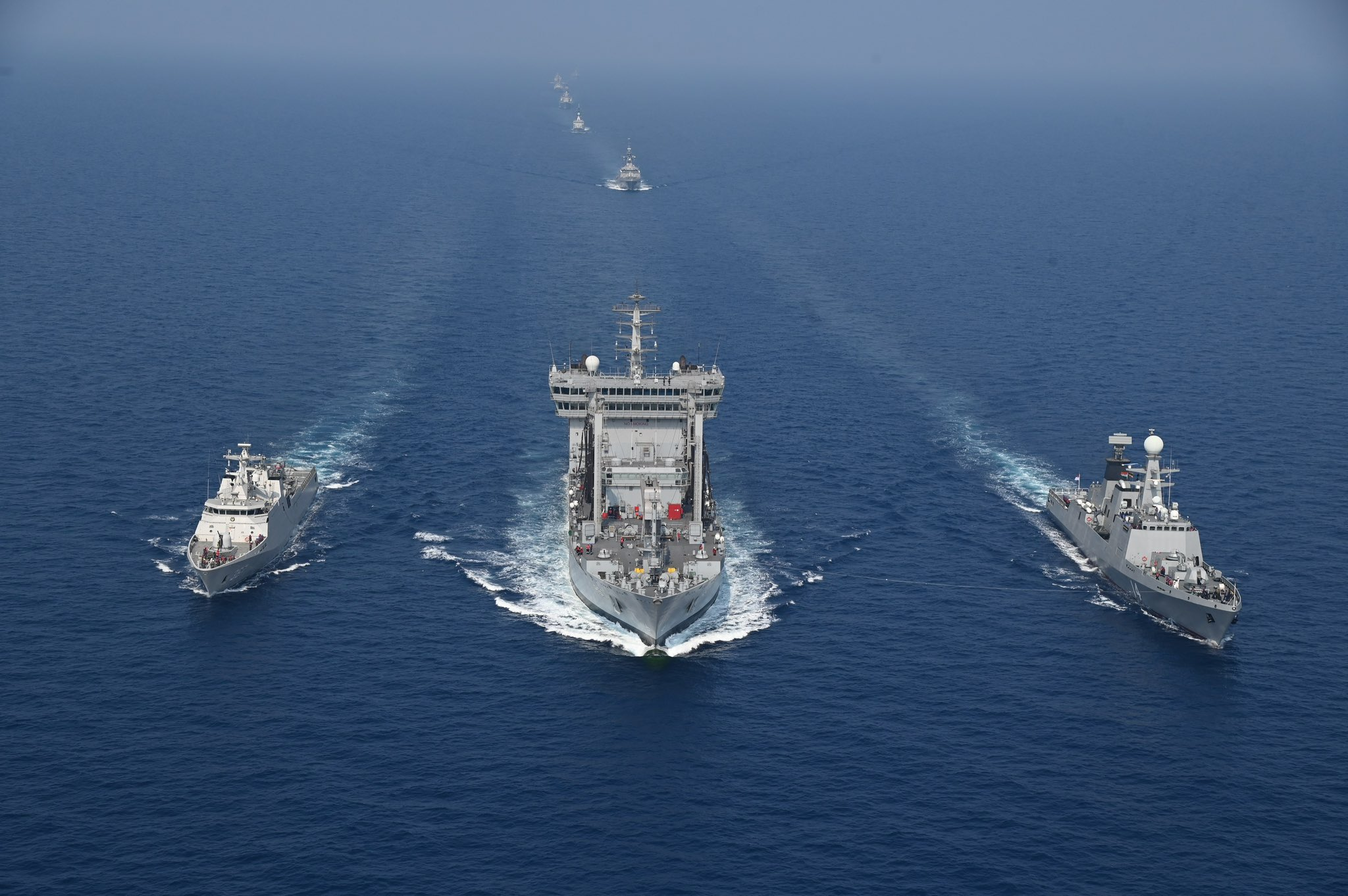
Sin Phyu Shin (F14) sporting Revathi radar with KRI Sultan Iskandar Muda (367) and INS Shakti (A57) during Milan 2024 exercise
