= Moe Aung =

Burmese naval admiral

His Excellency Zayya Kyawhtin Sithu Admiral Moe Aung
- မိုးအောင်
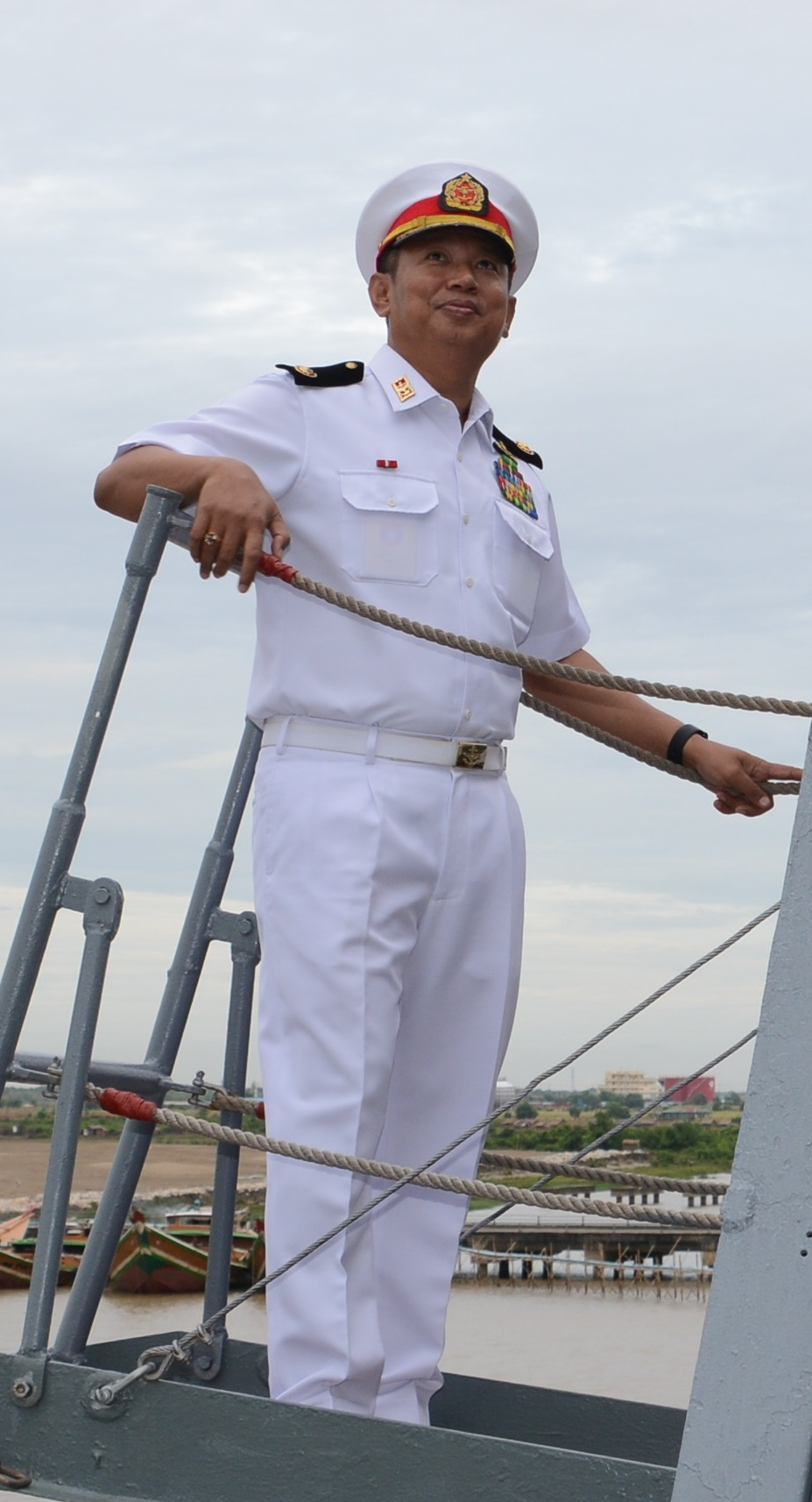
- Moe Aung visiting a Russian navy ship in 2016

Commander-in-Chief of Myanmar Navy
- In office 3 February 2021 – 8 January 2024
- Leader: Min Aung Hlaing
- Preceded by: General Tin Aung San
- Succeeded by: Lieutenant General Zwe Win Myint

Minister of State Administration Council Chairman's Office (1) Union Minister
- In office 5 May 2024 – 31 July 2025
- Preceded by: Ko Ko Hlaing
- Succeeded by: Position abolished

Minister of State Administration Council Chairman's Office (4) Union Minister
- In office 8 January 2024 – 5 May 2024
- Preceded by: Position established
- Succeeded by: Aung Kyaw Hoe

National Security Advisor to the State Administration Council
- In office 8 January 2024 – 31 July 2025
- Preceded by: Yar Pyae
- Succeeded by: Tin Aung San

Chief of General Staff (Navy)
- In office 2015–2021
- Preceded by: General Tin Aung San
- Succeeded by: Lieutenant General Zwe Win Myint

Personal details
- Born: 4 April 1966 (age 60) Burma (now Myanmar)
- Spouse: Aye Khine Nyunt
- Parent: Aung Thaung (father)
- Education: Defence Services Academy

Military service
- Allegiance: Myanmar
- Branch/service: Myanmar Navy
- Years of service: 1988–present
- Rank: Admiral

Moe Aung (Burmese: မိုးအောင်; pronounced [mò áuɴ]; born 1966) is a Burmese naval admiral who currently serves as the commander-in-chief of the Myanmar Navy. He was appointed to this position following the 2021 Myanmar coup d'etat, succeeding Admiral Tin Aung San, who transitioned to a role of the State Administration Council (SAC), the military junta. A graduate of the Defence Services Academy (28th intake), Moe Aung is the son of Aung Thaung, a former minister and influential political figure under the military-backed government of Senior General Than Shwe. As Commander-in-Chief, Moe Aung has overseen significant modernization efforts within the Myanmar Navy. His leadership has facilitated the acquisition of advanced naval assets, including new submarines, which have been crucial in enhancing Myanmar’s maritime defense capabilities. His tenure has focused on upgrading the navy's operational and strategic infrastructure to improve its effectiveness. Moe Aung has also contributed to expanding the navy’s officer training programs, aimed at developing the skills and expertise of naval personnel. He has also been crucial in establishing strategic international partnerships with countries such as India and Russia.

In January 2024, Moe Aung was appointed National Security Advisor on the State Administration Council, while his chief of staff, Zwe Win Myint, replaced him as chief of the Myanmar Navy. In his role as National Security Advisor, Moe Aung oversees the formulation and implementation of Myanmar’s national security policies and coordinates defense strategies. His role is pivotal in shaping Myanmar’s security framework and addressing key defense issues. His leadership has been central to the modernization and strategic realignment of Myanmar’s naval and defense sectors, marking a significant period of transformation in the country’s military capabilities.

In July 2025, following a government reshuffle, Moe Aung was reportedly removed from all posts. His absence from official farewell ceremonies and exclusion from new commission appointments raised questions about the status of the business holdings linked to his family, particularly United Amara Bank (UAB) and IGE Company. According to reporting by Khit Thit Media, these developments may signal the decline of the Aung Thaung family’s influence in Myanmar’s military and economic sectors.

== Early life and education ==
Moe Aung was born on 4 April 1966 in Myanmar (formerly Burma). He graduated from the 28th intake of the Defence Services Academy, a premier military academy in Myanmar that trains future leaders of the armed forces.

Moe Aung's father, Aung Thaung, was a prominent figure in Myanmar's military and political landscape, holding a high-ranking position within the Burmese military. Aung Thaung's influence extended beyond the military, contributing significantly to the family's business interests in Myanmar.

The Aung Thaung family has substantial business interests in the country. Notably, they have holdings in United Amara Bank (UAB), a significant financial institution in Myanmar. This involvement reflects the family's broad impact on both the economic and political spheres of the country.

Moe Aung also holds positions on the boards of directors for Myanma Economic Holdings Limited (MEHL) and Myanmar Economic Corporation (MEC). Both of these entities are military-owned conglomerates with substantial influence over Myanmar's economic sectors. In February 2022, the European Union imposed sanctions on MEHL and MEC due to their involvement in human rights violations and atrocities, reflecting ongoing concerns about the role of military-affiliated businesses in Myanmar's broader socio-political context.

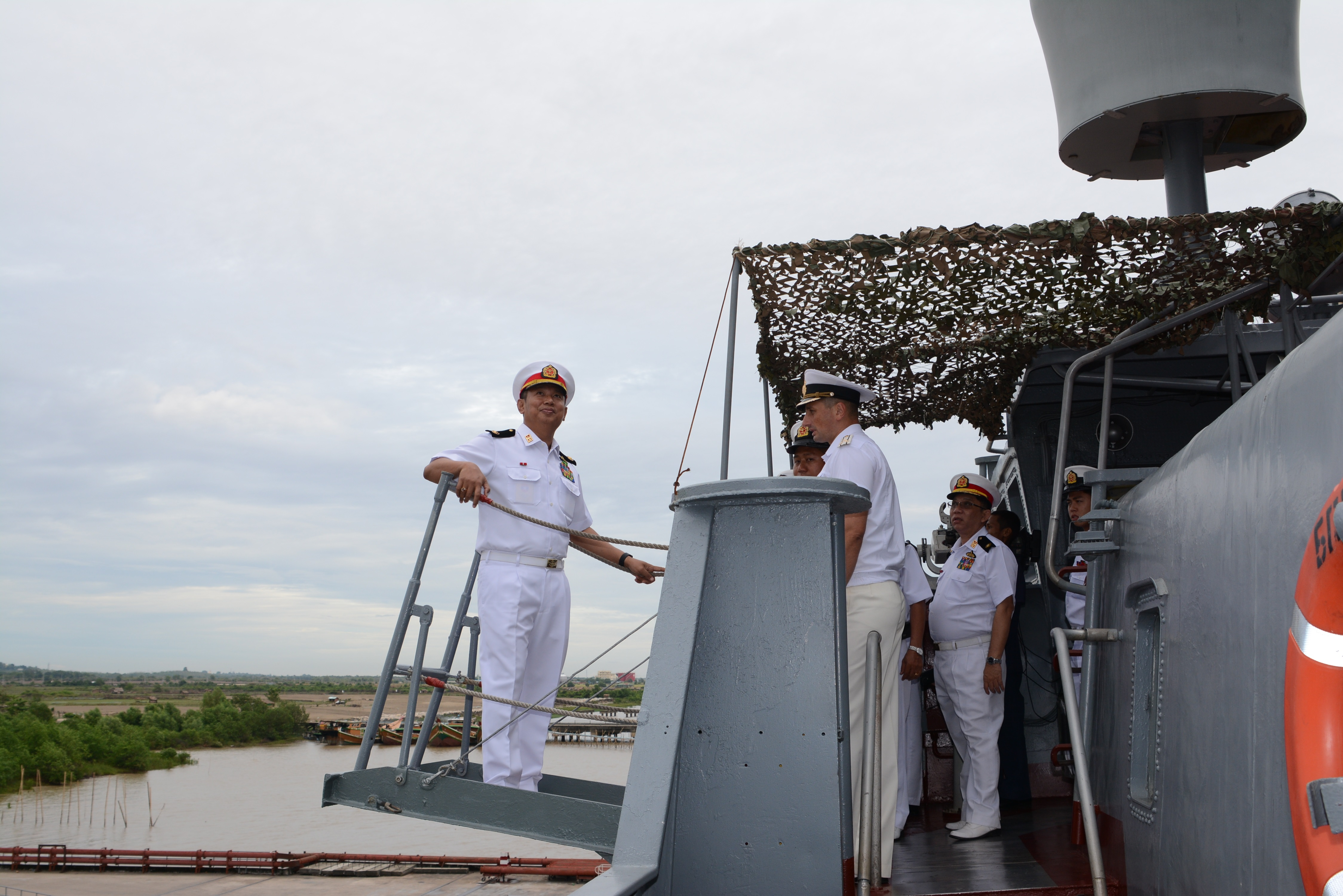
Moe Aung during a ship visit to Russian Navy Destroyer Admiral Vinogravdov on 20 May 2016

== Military career ==
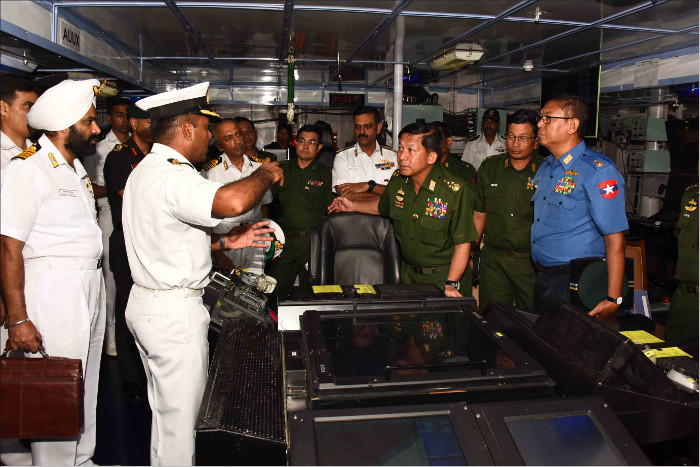
Admiral Moe Aung (right) with Senior General Min Aung Hlaing (center) and a high-level delegation visiting INS Satpura in February 2014

Moe Aung graduated from the 28th intake of the Defence Services Academy, a premier military academy in Myanmar that trains future leaders of the armed forces. His education and training there provided him with a solid foundation in military strategy and leadership, which he would later apply in his various roles within the Myanmar Navy. On 20 February 2023, the European Union (EU) imposed sanctions on Moe Aung in response to allegations of human rights violations and actions undermining democracy and the rule of law in Myanmar. These sanctions were part of a broader set of measures aimed at individuals and entities associated with the military junta in Myanmar, reflecting concerns over the impact of the military's actions on civilian populations and governance.

On 8 January 2024, Moe Aung was appointed as National Security Advisor to the State Administration Council (SAC), succeeding Lieutenant General Yar Pyae. This appointment marked a significant elevation in his career, positioning him as a key figure in shaping Myanmar’s national security policies. His selection was reportedly influenced by his success in procuring advanced naval equipment, such as submarines, and his role in arranging officer training exercises in international locations like India and Russia. These accomplishments were seen as critical in enhancing the operational readiness and strategic capabilities of the Myanmar Navy. The Fourth Meeting of the BIMSTEC National Security Chiefs was held in Myanmar on 26 July 2024, focusing on enhancing regional security challenges, including terrorism, organized crime, drug trafficking, maritime security, and cybersecurity, as well as strengthening regional cooperation in addressing them. Admiral Moe Aung, the National Security Advisor of Myanmar, played a pivotal role in ensuring the meeting was successfully hosted and seamlessly organized while providing a platform for discussing strategies to bolster collective security and resulted in agreements on several collaborative initiatives in Bay of Bengal Region.

In January 2024, Moe Aung's chief of staff, Zwe Win Myint, assumed the role of Commander-in-Chief of the Myanmar Navy, following Moe Aung's appointment as National Security Advisor. This transition marked a shift in the leadership structure of the Navy, with Moe Aung continuing to focus on national security issues while Zwe Win Myint took over the responsibilities of leading the naval forces.

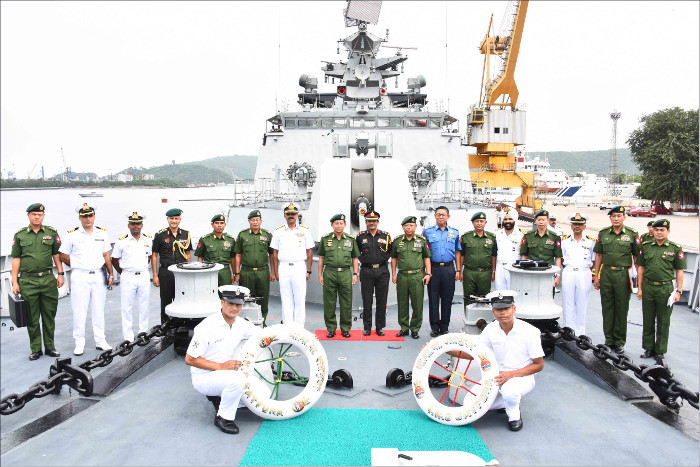
Moe Aung (third from the right) during a visit to Visakhapatnam with Senior General Min Aung Hlaing and delegation in July 2017

=== Government roles and leadership ===
In July 2025, Admiral Moe Aung was no longer included in the newly reconstituted government and military commissions formed following the State Administration Council (SAC) meeting on 31 July 2025. He was notably absent from the official farewell ceremony of the previous government held on 30 July 2025, an event attended by other outgoing officials. Reports suggest that Moe Aung has been removed from his roles as Minister for the Office of the Chairman of the SAC (No. 1 and No. 4), as well as from his position as National Security Advisor, which he assumed in January 2024. His absence from public view and omission from recent official appointments has led to speculation about his retirement or dismissal, potentially linked to shifting economic dynamics and competition within Myanmar’s military-aligned business sector.

=== Removal from office and business implications ===
In July 2025, Moe Aung was not present at the official farewell ceremony held by the State Administration Council (SAC) on 30 July, nor was he included in the subsequent reorganization of the government and military commission announced on 31 July. His absence from these events, along with a lack of public appearances, led to speculation regarding his status within the military leadership. On 4 August 2025, the independent outlet Khit Thit Media reported that Moe Aung had been removed from his government and military roles and had since not been seen in Nay Pyi Taw.

According to the report, Moe Aung’s removal coincided with growing uncertainty surrounding the future of businesses affiliated with his family, particularly United Amara Bank (UAB) and the IGE Group of Companies. These companies, founded and operated by Moe Aung’s relatives, including his brothers Nay Aung and Pyi Aung, had held significant investments in Myanmar’s banking, energy, and infrastructure sectors. The article indicated that several IGE-linked energy contracts had come under review or were reassigned to other entities following Moe Aung’s removal, including a previously announced pilot nuclear power project developed in cooperation with Russia.

IGE Company executives had participated in high-level international delegations, including the 2022 Russian Energy Week and a nuclear energy feasibility agreement signed with Rosatom in November 2022. However, by early 2024, key roles in these ventures were reportedly transferred to companies associated with other military-linked business figures, such as Maung Maung Naing, who is identified in reports as a close associate of the current military leadership.

In July 2024, UAB was among seven private banks fined by the Central Bank of Myanmar for exceeding permitted thresholds on housing loans. UAB was also reportedly named in official warnings regarding alleged irregularities in foreign exchange trading. These developments have contributed to speculation that Moe Aung’s political standing and his family's business influence may have declined.

As of August 2025, no official statement had been issued by the State Administration Council regarding Moe Aung’s removal or status, and his name was no longer listed in public announcements relating to senior military leadership.

== Personal life ==
Moe Aung is married to Aye Khine Nyunt. The couple maintains a relatively private life outside of his military and governmental roles.

== See also ==
- Myanmar civil war (2021–present)
