= Myanmar Navy Special Operations Task Force =

Special operations unit of the Myanmar Navy

- မြန်မာ့ရေတပ်အထူးစစ်ဆင်ရေးအထူးတပ်ဖွဲ့
- Shoulder sleeve insignia of the Myanmar Navy
- Active: 2010s–present
- Country: Myanmar
- Branch: Myanmar Navy
- Type: Special forces
- Role: Special operations, counterterrorism, maritime security
- Size: 1,100–1,200 active naval special forces personnel (estimated)
- Headquarters: Naypyidaw, Myanmar
- Motto: မြန်မာ့ပင်လယ်ကိုကာကွယ်ရန် ("To protect Myanmar sea.")
- Colors: Navy blue, White, Black

Commanders
- Commander-in-Chief of Defence Services of Myanmar: Senior General Min Aung Hlaing
- Commander-in-Chief (Navy): Admiral Htein Win

The Myanmar Navy Special Operations Task Force (Burmese: မြန်မာ့ရေတပ်အထူးစစ်ဆင်ရေးအထူးတပ်ဖွဲ့) is an elite special operations unit within the Myanmar Navy, a branch of the Tatmadaw (Myanmar Armed Forces). Established in the early 2010s, the unit is tasked with conducting maritime special operations, including counterterrorism, direct action, and reconnaissance missions. The force is modeled after similar units such as the United States Navy SEALs, with training programs designed to prepare operatives for a variety of complex maritime scenarios. It is estimated to have around 1,100 to 1,200 active naval special forces personnel, making it a significant component of Myanmar’s maritime security structure.

== History ==
The formation of the Myanmar Navy Special Operations Task Force was part of a broader initiative to enhance the special operations capabilities of the Tatmadaw. While the exact date of establishment is not publicly disclosed, reports suggest the unit became operational in the early 2010s. The unit's creation aimed to address emerging maritime security challenges and to provide the Myanmar Navy with a dedicated force capable of executing specialized missions.

== Organization and training ==
Details regarding the organizational structure and training regimen of the Myanmar Navy Special Operations Task Force are classified. However, it is known that the unit undergoes rigorous training programs, potentially including joint exercises with other branches of the Tatmadaw. The training emphasizes physical endurance, tactical proficiency, and adaptability to various maritime environments.

== Operations ==
Due to the secretive nature of special operations forces, specific missions undertaken by the Myanmar Navy Special Operations Task Force are not publicly documented. The unit is presumed to be involved in operations requiring specialized maritime capabilities, including counter-piracy, hostage rescue, and intelligence gathering.

== See also ==
- Myanmar Army Special Operations Task Force
- Myanmar Army
- Tatmadaw
- Myanmar Navy
- Min Aung Hlaing
- Htein Win
- Zaw Min Tun
