= Myanmar Coast Guard =

Coast Guard of Myanmar

- မြန်မာနိုင်ငံကမ်းခြေစောင့်တပ်ဖွဲ့ (Burmese)
- Emblem of the Myanmar Coast Guard
- Founded: 6 October 2021 (4 years ago)
- Country: Myanmar
- Type: Coast guard
- Role: Port and waterway security; Drug interdiction; Aids to navigation; Search and rescue; Illegal, unreported and unregulated fishing; Marine safety; Defense readiness; Migrant interdiction; Marine environmental protection; Law enforcement
- Size: 50+500 personnel
- Part of: Myanmar Armed Forces; Myanmar Navy (overseen)
- Headquarters: Myanmar Coast Guard Compound, Thanlyin Township, Yangon Division, Myanmar
- Mottos: စောင့်ရှောက် ကာကွယ် ဒို့ပင်လယ် Guard, Protect and Save Our Sea
- Anniversaries: 6 October
- Website: mcg.com.mm

Commanders
- Commander-in-Chief of Defence Services: Senior General Min Aung Hlaing
- Deputy Commander-in-Chief of Defence Services/Commander-in-Chief (Army): Vice Senior General Soe Win
- Commander-in-Chief (Navy): Admiral Htein Win
- Commandant of the Myanmar Coast Guard: Rear Admiral Tet Lwin Tun

Insignia
- Ensign

- Service mark

- Mark Logo

- Arms

Cap badges

Commissioned officers

NCOs and ORs

The Myanmar Coast Guard (Burmese: မြန်မာနိုင်ငံ ကမ်းခြေစောင့်တပ်ဖွဲ့) is a maritime law enforcement agency formed to safeguard Myanmar's ocean-based blue economy including marine tourism, maritime trade, deep seaport services, offshore oil and natural gas production and marine fishing, to prevent illegal trespassing in the seas, and to maintain the rule of law at sea. The Myanmar Coast Guard has a constabulary role in the protection of maritime interests, provides search and rescue for victims in the sea, and works toward sea environmental conservation, monitoring a wide range of activities underwater and above water in Myanmar's water territory.

== History ==
=== Background ===
Until the 2020s, Myanmar was one of the few Asian countries that did not have a force dedicated to offshore patrol. Maritime security was ensured by the Myanmar Navy and the Myanmar Police Force's Maritime Police. Operational demands eventually outstripped their abilities, and the superior operational and diplomatic benefits of a paramilitary organization were recognized.

On 14 March 2019, Myanmar's deputy defence minister submitted a proposal to the Pyithu Hluttaw to establish a national coast guard. The then-civilian government was making efforts to "civilianize" national security affairs and therefore wanted to establish the coast guard under either the Ministry of Transport and Communications or the President's Office. However, according to the 2008 Constitution, all of Myanmar's armed forces are controlled by the Chief of Defence Services.

=== Establishment ===
Initiated by the Aung San Suu Kyi-led NLD government in 2018, the Myanmar Coast Guard was formally established on 6 October 2021 at Thilawa Port in Thanlyin by Min Aung Hlaing, the ruling junta of the country since the February coup. It operates under the Ministry of Defence, in close cooperation with the Myanmar Navy, the Ministry of Livestock, Fisheries and Rural Development, the Ministry of National Planning and Economic Development and the Myanmar Police Force. The new force's remit is to guard Myanmar's 1930 km of coastal territory and its territorial waters, which encompass 23,070 km^{2} and about 1000 islands.

== Vision ==
To protect and safeguard the national maritime interests of the country, the safety and security of the marine environment, and To preserve and protect for law enforcement at sea from the main coastline to the exclusive economic zone, both from the sea and from the air.

== Missions ==
1. To maintain and protect the sovereignty, stability, rule of law and jurisdiction along the Myanmar coastline and in the territorial sea zones. 2. To protect and preserve the national interests of the sea, blue sea businesses and pollution of the marine environment. 3. To provide maritime safety, security and humanitarian assistance in the territorial sea zones and internal waters of Myanmar. 4. To enhance cooperation with international organizations, coast guards of neighboring countries, and domestic and foreign maritime organizations. 5. To assist the Myanmar Navy in times of national emergency.

== Tasks ==
1. Maritime safety. 2. Maritime security. 3. Protection of maritime interests and blue economy. 4. Maritime search and rescue. 5. Humanitarian assistance and natural disaster relief. 6. Maritime border control. 7. Fisheries control. 8. Law enforcement at sea. 9. Maritime customs control. 10. Marine environment protection. 11. To assist Myanmar Navy

== Vessels ==
The Myanmar Coast Guard started out with four former Navy patrol vessels. These vessels bear the pennant numbers P 311, P 312, P 411 and P 412.

=== Offshore Patrol Vessels ===
Type	Builder	No	Start using date	Arms	Remark
Osprey-50 class	Danyard A/S, Frederikshavn, Denmark	P-211	1982		

=== Patrol vessels ===
Type	Builder	No	Start using date	Arms	Remark
PGM 43 class	Marinette Marine, Wisconsin; last two by Peterson Builders, Sturgeon Bay, WI, United States	P-411; P-412; P-413; P-414; P-415	1959-1961		

=== Fast Patrol Vessels ===
Type	Builder	No	Start using year	Arms	Remark
5 series class	Myanmar Naval Dockyard	P-311; P-312; P-313	2013-2014		
48 m Fast Patrol Cutters	China	P-314; P-315; P-316; P-317	2023-2024		
