= Zwe Win Myint =

Burmese naval officer and Commander-in-Chief of the Myanmar Navy

His Excellency Lieutenant General Zayya Kyawhtin Zwe Win Myint
- ဇွဲ၀င်းမြင့်

Commander-in-Chief of Myanmar Navy
- In office 8 January 2024 – July 2024
- Preceded by: Admiral Moe Aung
- Succeeded by: Admiral Htein Win

Chief of General Staff (Navy)
- In office 3 February 2021 – 8 January 2024
- Preceded by: Admiral Moe Aung
- Succeeded by: Lieutenant General Aye Min Htwe

Personal details
- Born: 1968 (age 57–58)
- Education: Defence Services Academy
- Occupation: Navy officer
- Awards: Zayya Kyawhtin medal

Military service
- Allegiance: Myanmar
- Branch/service: Myanmar Navy
- Years of service: 1988–2024
- Rank: Lieutenant General
- Unit: Commander-in-Chief (Navy)

Zwe Win Myint (Burmese: ဇွဲဝင်းမြင့်; pronounced [zwɛ́ wɪ́ɴ mjɪ̰ɴ]; born 1968) is a Burmese naval officer who has served as the 16th Commander-in-Chief of the Myanmar Navy. Prior to this, he served as the Chief of Staff (Navy).

== Military career ==
Zwe Win Myint graduated from the Defence Services Academy, 30th Intake, and serves in the Navy with the identification number 3474. He was promoted through various ranks, becoming the Commander of Fleet No. 1 in 2015 and, by 2016, serving as the Tanintharyi Naval Regional Headquarters Commander with the rank of Captain. Subsequently, he was promoted to Commodore and held positions as the Ayeyarwady Naval Regional Headquarters Commander and Dala Naval Base Commander. On 3 February 2021, when Admiral Moe Aung became the Commander-in-Chief of the Myanmar Navy, he was appointed as the Chief of Staff (Navy). Later, on January 8, 2024, following Admiral Moe Aung's transfer to a civilian ministry, he became the 16th Commander-in-Chief of the Navy. He served in this role for about six months before submitting his resignation in July 2024.

=== Notable events ===
In 2015, he led the repatriation of 102 Myanmar nationals from Malaysia using the warship Maha Thiha Thura. Additionally, in 2020, he served as the Commander of Fleet Exercise-2020, which included the participation of the attack submarine Minye Theinkhathu.

== Awards received ==
In 2022, Zwe Win Myint was awarded the honorary title of 'Zeya Kyaw Htin,' a military honor.
