= Thet Swe =

Retired Burmese naval admiral and politician

His Excellency Vice-Admiral Thura Thet Swe
- သူရသက်ဆွေ
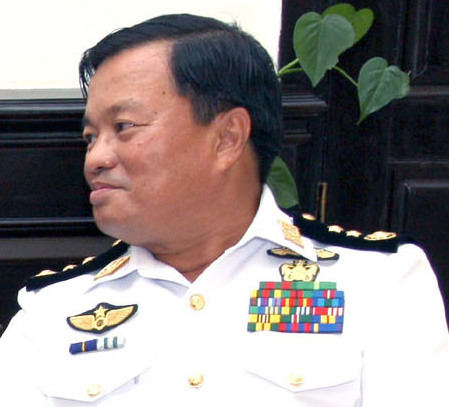
- Vice-Admiral Thura Thet Swe during his visit to India in 2013

Commander-in-Chief of the Myanmar Navy
- In office 2012 – August 2015
- President: Thein Sein
- Preceded by: Nyan Tun
- Succeeded by: Tin Aung San

Personal details
- Born: c. 1964–1965 Myanmar
- Party: Union Solidarity and Development Party
- Profession: Naval officer, politician
- Known for: Commander-in-Chief of the Myanmar Navy, 2015 general election candidate
- Awards: Thura title

Military service
- Allegiance: Myanmar
- Branch/service: Myanmar Navy
- Years of service: c. 1980s–2015
- Rank: Vice-Admiral
- Commands: Myanmar Navy

Thura Thet Swe (Burmese: သူရသက်ဆွေ; pronounced [θùɹà θɛʔ swè]; born Myanmar) is a retired Burmese naval officer who served as the Commander-in-Chief of the Myanmar Navy from 2012 to August 2015. He later entered politics as a candidate for the Union Solidarity and Development Party (USDP) in the 2015 general election. His career includes senior military service, naval diplomacy, and political involvement.

== Military career ==
Thet Swe served in the Myanmar Navy and attained the rank of Vice-Admiral. He was appointed Commander-in-Chief of the Myanmar Navy in 2012, succeeding Vice-Admiral Nyan Tun. He held this position until August 2015, when he retired and was succeeded by Vice-Admiral Tin Aung San. During his tenure, he oversaw naval operations and participated in expanding Myanmar's regional naval cooperation.

In July 2013, Thet Swe led an official naval delegation to India, visiting the Southern Naval Command in Kochi. The delegation toured naval training facilities including the Indian Navy’s missile and gunnery school and the Cochin Shipyard. According to The Times of India, the visit included meetings with senior Indian naval officers and was part of a broader bilateral naval engagement program.

== Political involvement ==
Following his retirement from military service, Thet Swe stood as a candidate for the Pyithu Hluttaw (House of Representatives) seat representing the Coco Islands constituency during the 2015 general election, running under the Union Solidarity and Development Party.

The Irrawaddy noted that his candidacy was part of a broader trend involving retired senior military officers contesting parliamentary seats, particularly in remote or strategically important areas. Reports indicated that Thet Swe had access to the constituency via government transportation before the official campaign period began, access that was not available to other candidates.

== Titles and honours ==
The honorific title "Thura" is awarded by the Myanmar government for distinguished acts of bravery or military service.

== Public record ==
As of 2025, Thet Swe is estimated to be around 60 years old.

== See also ==
- Myanmar Navy
- Union Solidarity and Development Party
- 2015 Myanmar general election
