= IGE Group of Companies =

Conglomerate based in Myanmar

- Native name: အိုင်ဂျီအီး ကုမ္ပဏီအုပ်စု
- Company type: Limited company
- Industry: Timber, Oil & Gas, Electricity, Banking, Hotels, Telecommunications, Construction
- Founded: 1994; 32 years ago
- Headquarters: Yangon, Myanmar
- Owner: Ne Aung; Pyi Aung
- Number of employees: 4,000
- Subsidiaries: Aung Yee Phyo Company; UNOG Company; United Amara Bank
- Website: www.ige.com.mm

The International Group of Entrepreneurs (Burmese: အိုင်ဂျီအီး ကုမ္ပဏီအုပ်စု; IGE Group) is one of Myanmar's 5 largest conglomerates, possessing 13 subsidiaries that employ 4,000 people. IGE also possesses Myanmar's second largest timber trading company. It also exports Burmese rice. IGE Group of Companies was established in 1994 in Burma, and registered in Singapore in 2001. The company is also active in the country's oil and gas sector. In 2007, IGE earned over US$75 million in revenues. The company was previously subjected to economic sanctions by the United States government, because of its ties to the State Peace and Development Council, the former military junta.

It is owned by Ne Aung, the son of Aung Thaung, a politician and former military general.

== Subsidiaries ==
- United National Oil & Gas Trading Co., Ltd. (UNOG Trading)
- Myanmar Rice Trading Co., Ltd. (MRT)
- IGE Energy Co., Ltd.
- Future Creator Group of Construction Co., Ltd. (FCGC)
- Crete Master Ready-Mixed Concrete Co., Ltd. (CMC)
- IGE Land Co., Ltd. (IGE Land)
- International Power Generation Public Co., Ltd (IPG)
- United National Oil & Gas Co., Ltd. (UNOG)
- The Amara Hotel Co., Ltd.
- IGE Sin Phyu Shin Co., Ltd. (IGE SPS)
- United Amara Bank
- UAB Securities Limited
