= Aung Thaung =

Burmese politician and businessman

- အောင်သောင်း

Member of the Pyithu Hluttaw
- In office 30 March 2011 – 23 July 2015
- Constituency: Taungtha Township
- Majority: 122,171 (92.92%)

Minister for Industry-1 of Myanmar
- In office 15 November 1997 – 30 March 2011
- Succeeded by: Soe Thein

Minister for Livestock and Fisheries
- In office 1996–1997

Deputy Minister for Commerce
- In office 1993–1996

Personal details
- Born: 1 December 1940 Taungtha, Mandalay, Burma
- Died: July 23, 2015 (aged 74) (Note: The Irrawaddy Magazine gives 1 December 1940 as his birth date (from his official passport), and if so, he died at the age of 75 (or 76 per traditional Burmese age counting). But the obituary announcement by the family in local newspapers Myanmar Alin and Kyemon mentions that he died at the age of 79.) Singapore
- Cause of death: Stroke
- Party: Union Solidarity and Development Party
- Spouse: Khin Khin Yi
- Children: Moe Aung; Ne Aung; Pyi Aung; Khin Ngu Yi Phyo
- Education: Mandalay University; Officer Training School, Bahtoo

Military service
- Allegiance: Myanmar
- Branch/service: Myanmar Army
- Years of service: 1964-1993
- Rank: Lieutenant Colonel

Aung Thaung (Burmese: အောင်သောင်း; 1 December 1940 – 23 July 2015) was a Burmese politician and businessman. He served as a member of the country's lower house, the Pyithu Hluttaw, representing the constituency of Taungtha Township, after being elected in the 2010 general election.

== Career ==
Aung Thaung was born on 1 December 1940 in Taungtha Township, Mandalay Division, Burma. He graduated from Mandalay University in 1964 and subsequently became a teacher. He joined the army in 1964 and remained active in the military until 1993, when he became a deputy commerce minister.

After serving in the army for several years, Aung Thaung served as the country's Ministry of Industry-1 from 1997 to 2011 and was known for his close ties to Than Shwe and Maung Aye. Widely considered a hardliner, he was known for his widespread business interests in Myanmar.

He also served in prominent leadership positions in the Union Solidarity and Development Association, the progenitor of the Union Solidarity and Development Party (USDP), the country's military-backed political party. On 2 May 2011, Aung Thaung was appointed Secretary 1 of the USDP. He was also involved in brokering several ceasefire agreements with ethnic rebel groups, but was sidelined from the Burmese government's negotiating team with the Kachin Independence Organization in 2012, citing "health reasons."

== Allegations of human rights abuses ==
He is often cited by opposition activists as one of the key architects of the Depayin massacre. Leaked diplomatic cables linked him to plainclothes paramilitary militias that opposed and attacked protesters to incite counterattack from the protesters, which could serve as a pretext for their arrest. These paramilitary militias were accused of inciting anti-Muslim riots in Myitkyina in March 2013.

== Business ties ==
Aung Thaung and his family are among the wealthiest in Myanmar and have numerous business interests in the country, including Aung Yee Phyo Company and IGE Group of Companies, founded in Myanmar in 1994 and registered at Singapore in 2001. His sons are believed to have benefited from a system of economic patronage through Aung Thaung's ability to consolidate government contracts for construction and trade. In 2010, the Burmese government issued a license to establish a private bank, United Amara Bank, with his son's name, Nay Aung.

== Personal life ==
Aung Thaung was married to Khin Khin Yi, and has three sons: Ne Aung, Pyi Aung, and Moe Aung. Pyi Aung (also spelt Pye Aung) is married to Nanda Aye, the daughter of former ruling general Maung Aye. His other son Nay Aung runs Aung Yee Phyo Company, which deals in timber and the rice trades. Pyi Aung and Nay Aung are also managing directors of IGE Group of Companies. His son Moe Aung is a Vice Admiral and Chief of Staff of Burmese Navy.

== Death ==
Aung Thaung collapsed on 8 July 2015, following complications from a stroke, and was admitted to Naypyidaw General Hospital. Yangon-based neurosurgeons were flown in to treat him, but he did not regain consciousness. He was transported to Singapore for further treatment, with little chance of recovery.

After being treated in the intensive care unit for two weeks, he died on 23 July 2015 in Singapore. His body was flown back to Myanmar on the same day.
