= Aung Yee Phyo Company =

Aung Yee Phyo Company Ltd.
- Native name: အောင်ရည်ဖြိုးကုမ္ပဏီ
- Company type: Limited company
- Industry: Timber, Agriculture
- Headquarters: Yangon, Myanmar
- Owner: Nay Aung; Pyi Aung
- Parent: IGE Group of Companies

Aung Yee Phyo Company (Burmese: အောင်ရည်ဖြိုးကုမ္ပဏီ) is a timber trading and agricultural production company based in Myanmar. An affiliate of the IGE Group of Companies, it is owned by Nay Aung and Pyi Aung, the sons of Aung Thaung, a politician and former military general. The company is currently subjected to economic sanctions by the United States government, because of its ties to the State Peace and Development Council, the former military junta.
