= Maung Maung Naing =

Burmese businessman (born 1977)

- မောင်မောင်နိုင်
- Born: c. 1977 (age 47–48)
- Occupation: Businessman
- Organization(s): Sky One Construction; Yetagon Energy

Maung Maung Naing (Burmese: မောင်မောင်နိုင်); born c. 1977) is a Burmese businessman associated with Sky One Construction and Yetagon Energy, and is known for his close ties to the family of Min Aung Hlaing, the leader of Myanmar's military junta, the State Administration Council.

== Early life and education ==
Maung Maung Naing was born c. 1977 to a Sino-Burmese family.

== Career ==
Before becoming an entrepreneur, Maung Maung Naing worked at his uncle's tire shop in Yangon. There, he formed a relationship with Min Aung Hlaing, and partnered with his son, Aung Pyae Sone, to supply tires to the Burmese military and construction companies.

In 2013, Maung Maung Naing established Sky One Construction, which is closely linked with the Myanmar Economic Corporation, a military-owned conglomerate. Since the 2021 Myanmar coup d'etat, Sky One has expanded its business portfolio to telecoms and energy sectors. He is also the CEO of Yetagon Energy. In August 2022, the British government sanctioned Sky One to limit the Burmese military's access to arms and revenue.
