= Myanmar Army Special Operations Task Force =

Unit of the Myanmar Army

- အကြမ်းဖက် နှိမ်နင်းရေး တပ်ဖွဲ့
- Shoulder sleeve insignia of the Myanmar Army Special Operations Task Force
- Active: 1996–present
- Country: Myanmar
- Branch: Myanmar Army
- Type: Special forces
- Role: Special operations and counterterrorism
- Size: 1,100–1,200 personnel
- Part of: Office of the Commander-in-Chief (Army)
- Headquarters: Headquarters of the Special Operations Task Force, Naypyidaw, Myanmar
- Nickname: MASOTF
- Motto: လုံခြုံရေးစောင့်ရှောက်သူများ၏အိမ်မြေ။ ("Homeland of the guardians of security.")
- Colors: Olive green; Light green; Red
- Anniversaries: 1996

Commanders
- Commander-in-Chief of Defence Services of Myanmar: Senior General Min Aung Hlaing
- Deputy Commander-in-Chief (Army): Vice-Senior General Soe Win
- Spokesperson of the Myanmar Army: Major General Zaw Min Tun
- Commander: Lieutenant General
- Deputy Commander: General

The Myanmar Army Special Operations Task Force (Burmese: အကြမ်းဖက် နှိမ်နင်းရေး တပ်ဖွဲ့, lit. 'Counter-Terrorism Force') is an elite special forces unit within the Myanmar Army, a branch of the Tatmadaw (Myanmar Armed Forces). Established in 1996, the unit specializes in conducting special operations, including counter-insurgency, reconnaissance, and direct action missions. It operates under the command structure of the Myanmar Army and is considered one of its premier formations.

== History ==
The Special Operations Task Force was formed in 1996 to enhance the Myanmar Army's capabilities in unconventional warfare and rapid response to internal security threats. Its creation aimed to address the need for specialized units capable of operating in diverse and challenging environments across the country.

== Structure and organization ==
While specific details about the unit's internal structure are not publicly disclosed, the Special Operations Task Force is known to be part of the Myanmar Army's broader special operations framework. It operates alongside other specialized units and falls under the purview of the army's high command.

== Operations ==
Due to the secretive nature of special forces operations, comprehensive information about the missions and engagements of the Special Operations Task Force is limited. However, it is understood that the unit has been involved in various operations aimed at countering insurgencies and maintaining internal security within Myanmar.

== Insignia ==
The unit's insignia features a distinctive shoulder sleeve emblem, symbolizing its elite status within the Myanmar Army. The design elements of the insignia reflect the unit's specialized role and operational focus.
