= UAB (company) =

Commercial bank in Myanmar

uab
- Formerly: United Amara Bank
- Type: Private
- Industry: Bank
- Founded: August 2010
- Founder: U Ne Aung
- Headquarters: uab Tower @ Times City, Yangon, Myanmar (Burma)
- Key people: Nay Aye (Independent Chairman); Christopher Loh (MD & CEO)
- Total assets: Ks.1819.4 billion (US$866 million) (2021-22)
- Owner: U Ne Aung
- Website: www.uab.com.mm

uab (formerly known as United Amara Bank) is a private commercial bank in Myanmar.

== History ==
uab was one of 4 private banks to commence operations in August 2010, the first new financial institutions in the country since the establishment of Innwa Bank in 1997. uab bank has a network of over 79 branches in 53 townships across Myanmar. Christopher Loh is the CEO of the bank.

The bank is majority owned by Ne Aung, the son of Aung Thaung, who has been blacklisted by the United States Treasury on 31 October 2014 for his membership in the country's ruling military junta, the State Peace and Development Council and his attempts to undermine Burma's economic and political reforms.

In 2013, uab Bank started using Pumori Banking Software, developed by Mercantile Office Systems, Kathmandu Nepal.

In 2016, uab bank and Asian Development Bank signed a trade finance agreement to support businesses in Myanmar. In 2017, uab bank launched Visa-branded credit cards in Myanmar to cater to the demand for electronic payments in the country.

uab bank and Global Star Co. Ltd. partnered with Huawei to distribute solar energy products in Myanmar.

== Awards and nominations ==
Global Banking & Finance Awards gave uab bank, Best Banking CEO Myanmar award in 2019.

In 2022, uab bank was given Best bank in Myanmar award by The Euromoney Awards for Excellence.
