= Htein Win =

Burmese military officer

- ထိန်ဝင်း

Commander-in-Chief of the Myanmar Navy
- Incumbent
- Assumed office July 2024
- Leader: Min Aung Hlaing
- Preceded by: Zwe Win Myint

Personal details
- Born: Burma (now Myanmar)

Military service
- Allegiance: Myanmar
- Branch/service: Myanmar Army; Myanmar Navy
- Years of service: 1989–2020 (Army); 2020–present (Navy)
- Rank: Admiral
- Commands: Southern Command

Admiral Htein Win (Burmese: ထိန်ဝင်း) is a Burmese military officer and current commander of Myanmar's Southern Command, which encompasses Bago and Magway Regions. Magway Region, as part of the Bamar heartland, has been a major centre of the civilian resistance in the Myanmar civil war (2021–present), since the 2021 Myanmar coup d'etat. Htein Win has overseen the military's 'kill all, burn all, loot all' strategy in Magway Region. He has been sanctioned by the European Union, Switzerland, and Canada for violating human rights and committing crimes against civilians in the Southern Command.

In April 2007, he was a brigadier general overseeing Taikkyi station.

In July 2024, he was appointed Chief of Naval Staff following the resignation of his predecessor Vice Admiral Zwe Win Myint. Later in early January 2025, he was promoted to full Admiral.

== See also ==
- Myanmar civil war (2021–present)
- State Administration Council
- Tatmadaw
