= Myanmar Navy =

Naval warfare branch of Myanmar's armed forces

Defence Services (Navy)
- Tatmadaw (Yay) တပ်မတော် (ရေ) (Burmese)
- Emblem; Shoulder Sleeve
- Founded: 24 December 1947; 78 years ago
- Country: Myanmar (formerly Burma)
- Type: Navy
- Size: 30,000 active personnel (as of 2022)
- Part of: Myanmar Defence Services
- Headquarters: Naypyidaw
- Mottos: မြန်မာ့ပင်လယ် ဒို့ကာကွယ်။ ("We defend Myanmar's sea."); မြန်မာ့ပင်လယ်ပြင်ကို ကာကွယ်ဖို့။ ("Protecting the Myanmar's sea."); မြန်မာ့ရေပိုင်နက်ကို ကာကွယ်စောင့်ရှောက်မယ်။ ("We protect Myanmar territorial waters."); မြန်မာ့ပင်လယ်ကို ကာကွယ်ရန် ("To protect Myanmar sea.")
- Colours: Navy blue, White, Black (for Myanmar Navy Seals)
- Anniversaries: 24 December 1948
- Equipment: List of equipment in the Myanmar Navy
- Engagements: Internal conflict in Myanmar; Myanmar civil war (2021–present); Conflict in Rakhine State (2016–present); 2021 Myanmar coup d'etat

Commanders
- Commander-in-Chief (Navy): Admiral Htein Win
- Chief of Naval Staff: Rear Admiral Thein Htoo
- Commander of the Engineering Section: Commodore Aung Thu Soe

Insignia
- Ensign

- Pennant

- former Ensign (1948 - 1974)

- former Ensign (1974 - 1994)

The Myanmar Navy, officially the Defence Services (Navy) (Burmese: တပ်မတော် (ရေ), romanized: Tatmadaw (Yay); pronounced [taʔmədɔ̀ jè]), is the naval warfare branch of the Myanmar Defence Services (Tatmadaw), the combined military of Myanmar. With 19,000 active personnel, the navy operates more than 227 vessels. Its official name was Burma Navy (Burmese: ဗမာ့ရေတပ်မတော်, romanized: Bama Yay Tatmadaw) before being renamed to Defence Services (Navy) (Burmese: တပ်မတော် (ရေတပ်), romanized: Tatmadaw (Yay Tat)) in 1956. Prior to 1988, the navy was small, and its role in counter-insurgency operations was smaller than those of the army and the air branches. The navy has since been expanded to take on a more active role in defense of Myanmar's territorial waters.

== History ==
=== Pre-independence ===
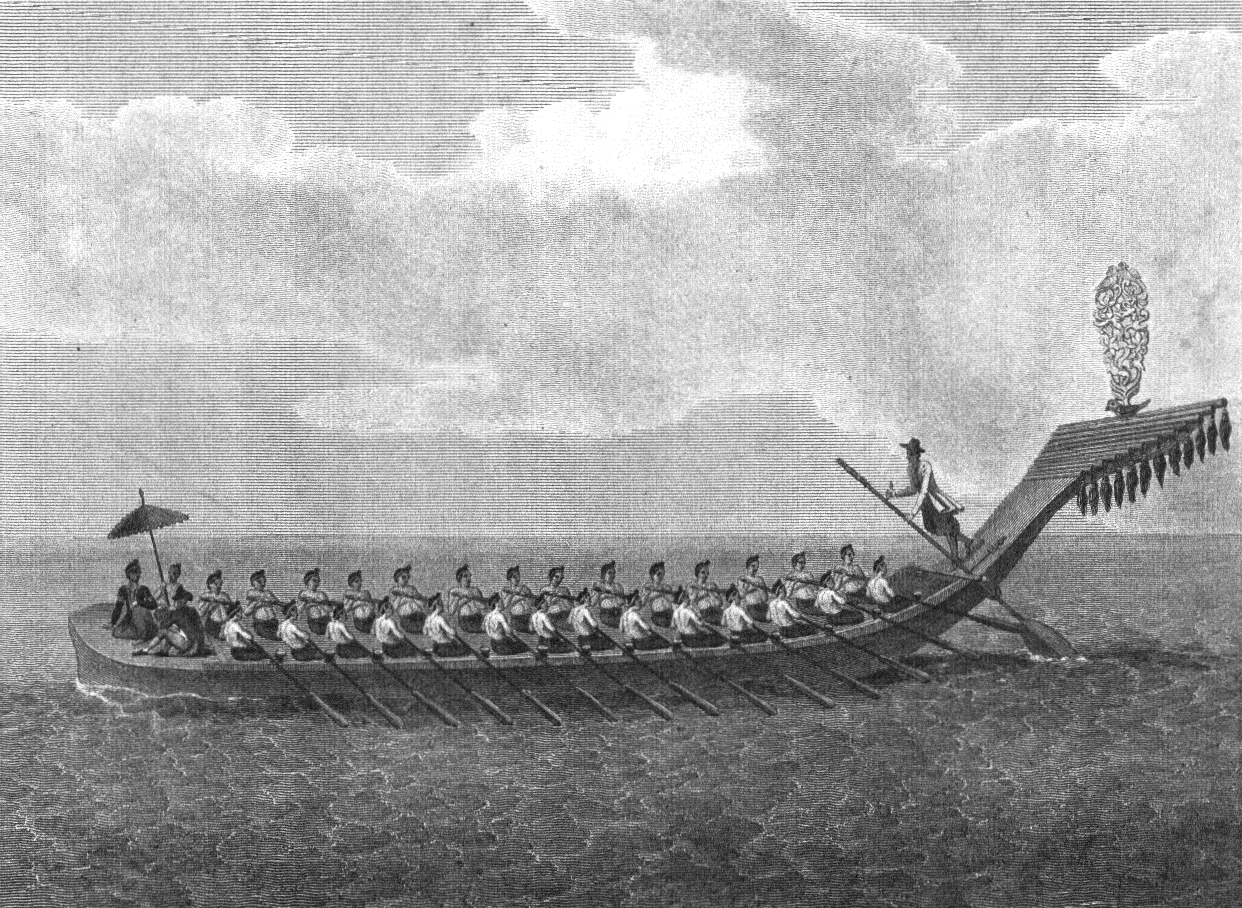
A Myanmar war boat in 1795

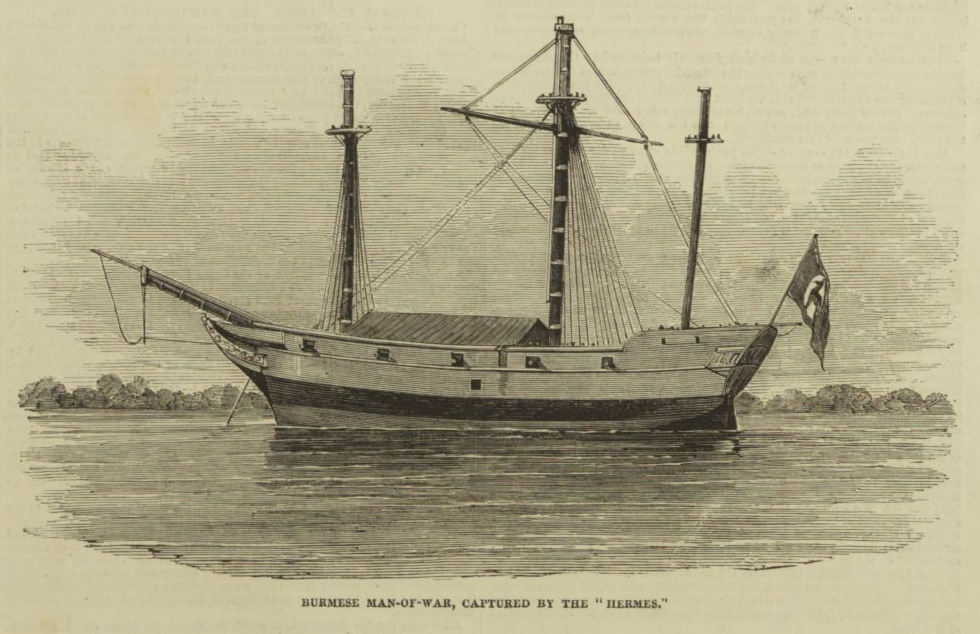
Burmese man-of-war, 19th century

The naval arm of the Royal Armed Forces consisted mainly of shallow draft river boats. Its primary missions were to control the Irrawaddy River, and to protect the ships carrying the army to the front. The major war boats carried up to 30 musketeers and were armed with 6- or 12-pounder cannon. By the mid-18th century, the navy had acquired a few seafaring ships, crewed by European and foreign sailors, that were used to transport the troops in Siamese and Arakanese campaigns.

The Arakanese and the Mon, from maritime regions, maintained more seaworthy flotillas than the inland riverborne "navy" of the Royal Burmese Army.

=== Founding and the Second World War ===
On 1 April 1937, Burma became a separately administered colony of Britain, and thereafter became responsible for her own local naval defence. It was decided that a naval volunteer reserve force should be formed to implement this responsibility and so provide a local force for the naval administration and defence of the ports and coast of Burma in time of war.

On the recommendation of Vice Admiral Sir James Fownes Somerville, then Commander-in-Chief, East Indies, Lieutenant Commander Kenneth Sidebottom Lyle from Royal Navy was sent to Burma and arrived in Rangoon in June 1939, commissioned to form the volunteer reserve force and to be appointed Naval Office-in-Charge, Rangoon, on the outbreak of war.

On 6 September 1940, Burma Royal Navy Volunteer Reserve was officially formed under the Burma Act XV, 1940. The Burma R.N.V.R was placed under the operational orders of Vice Admiral Sir Herbert Fitzherbert, commanding the Royal Indian Navy, but retains its own identity and its own administration under the Government of Burma.

Burma R.N.V.R, although very small, played an active part in Allied operations against the Japanese during the Second World War. By 1 December 1945, the Royal Navy has been withdrawn and the Burma R.N.V.R assumed all naval responsibilities on the coast and waters of Burma.

=== Burmese independence ===
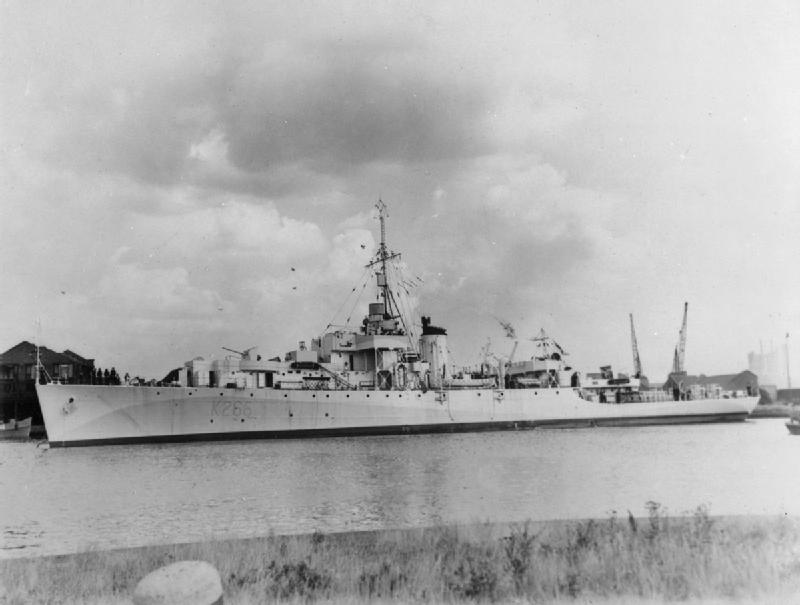
UBS Mayu

In December 1947, the Union of Burma Navy was formed with 700 men mostly from Burma R.N.V.R. The fleet initially consisted of a small but diverse collection of ships transferred from the Royal Navy under the arrangements made for Burma's independence in January 1948. It included the UBS Mayu, an ex-Royal Navy River-class frigate, and four Landing Craft Gun (Medium). British Defense Ministry sold with the original 25-pounder guns on naval mountings and Oerlikon 20mm cannons which were reinstalled later.

=== 1950s ===
In 1950 and 1951, the United States provided 10 coast guard cutters (CGC) under the Mutual Defense Assistance Program (MDAP). The Myanmar Navy played an important part in the government's fight against the ethnic and ideological insurgent groups which threatened the Union Government in its early days. The Myanmar Navy performed both defensive and offensive roles, protecting convoys, carrying supplies, ferrying troops and giving much-needed fire support. It was instrumental in relieving the port city of Moulmein, which was captured by Karen insurgents in 1948, and the Irrawaddy Delta town of Bassein. Although one armed patrol boat defected to the Karen insurgents, throughout the turbulent years of post independence in Myanmar, the navy was largely unopposed and maintained control over Myanmar's crucial inland waterways.

In 1956 and 1957, the Burmese government acquired five 50-long-ton (51 t) Saunders-Roe Dark-class convertible motor torpedo/motor gunboats, followed by an 1,040-long-ton (1,060 t) Algerine-class minesweeper in 1958 from the United Kingdom. In the late 1950s and early 1960s, the United States sold the Burmese Navy six PGM type coastal patrol craft and seven CGC-type patrol boats. In 1958, Myanmar's Navy took delivery of 10 Y-301-class river gunboats from Yugoslavia, followed by 25 smaller Michao-class patrol craft.

=== 1960s ===
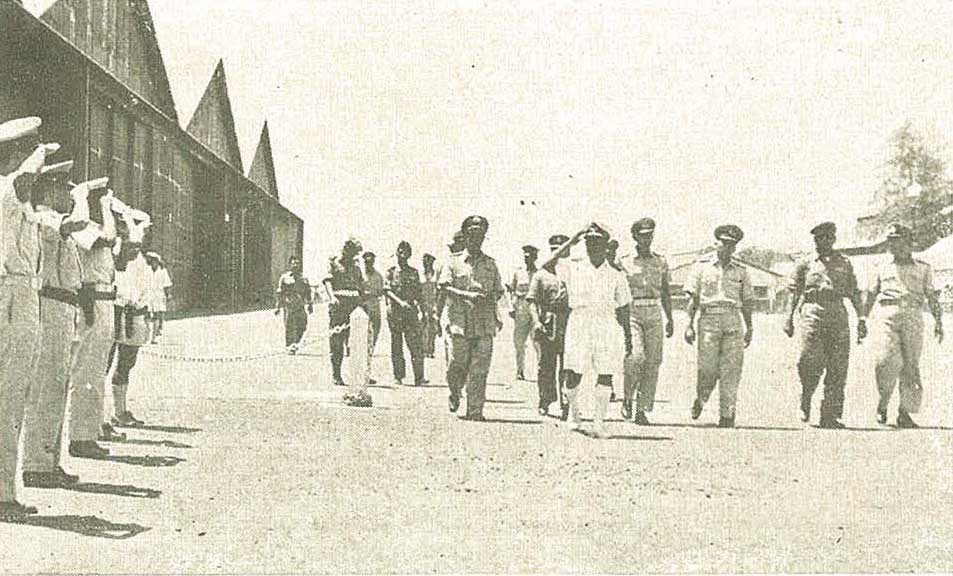
Burmese Navy visiting Indonesia in 1960

Efforts were made to produce locally made naval vessels with assistance from Yugoslavia. In 1960, the Myanmar Navy commissioned two 400-long-ton (410 t) Nawarat-class corvettes. Their armaments include 25-pounder field gun and 40 mm Bofors anti-aircraft gun. Myanmar shipyards also built a number of smaller patrol craft and a number of landing craft. Landing craft and auxiliary ships are usually armed with Oerlikon 20 mm cannons, 40 mm Bofors anti-aircraft guns and heavy machine guns. In the mid-1960s, the Myanmar Navy took delivery of ex-US Navy 640-long-ton (650 t) PCE-827 class corvette and a 650-long-ton (660 t) Admirable-class minesweeper, both of which were commissioned in the mid-1940s.

=== 1970s ===
Although it expanded rapidly during the 1950s and 1960s, the navy was unable to keep pace with loss or deterioration of older vessels in the 1970s. In 1978, the United States provided the Myanmar Navy with six small river patrol craft. A naval replacement program was initiated by BSPP Government in 1979.

=== 1980s ===
In 1980, the navy acquired six Carpentaria-class inshore patrol boats from Australia followed by three 128-ton Swift-type coastal patrol boats from Singapore and three 385-ton Osprey-class offshore patrol vessels built in Denmark. The Osprey- and Swift-class boats have a range of 4,500 and 1,800 miles (7,200 and 2,900 km), respectively, and were armed with Oerlikon 20 mm cannons and 40 mm Bofors anti-aircraft guns. In the early 1980s, Burmese naval shipyards built three 128-ton PGM type patrol boats based upon US PGM-class patrol boats. Each boat was armed with two 40 mm Bofors anti-aircraft guns and two 12.7 mm heavy machine guns.

=== 1990s ===
The Myanmar Navy purchased six missile escort boats and ten submarine chasers from China. Since 1998, the navy has built two 77 m (252 ft 7 in) Anawrahta-class corvettes (771 and 772) and four fast attack craft (551-554).

=== 2008 Naval Clash with Bangladesh ===
In 2008 a naval encounter took place between the Bangladesh Navy and the Myanmar Navy. The confrontation was a direct result of the Myanmar Navy allowing companies to drill for natural gas and oil in a disputed area of the Bay of Bengal.

==== May 2008 Cyclone Nargis ====
As many as 25 Burmese naval ships may have been sunk in the storm caused by Cyclone Nargis in May 2008, while an unknown number of naval personnel and their family members were killed or are listed as missing. The Network for Democracy and Development in Thailand reported that 30 officers and 250 Burmese naval personnel were declared missing, while 25 vessels were destroyed by the cyclone in three naval regional command centres: Panmawaddy Regional Command on Hainggyi Island; Irrawaddy Regional Command; and Danyawaddy Regional Command in Sittwe in Arakan State.

=== 2010s ===
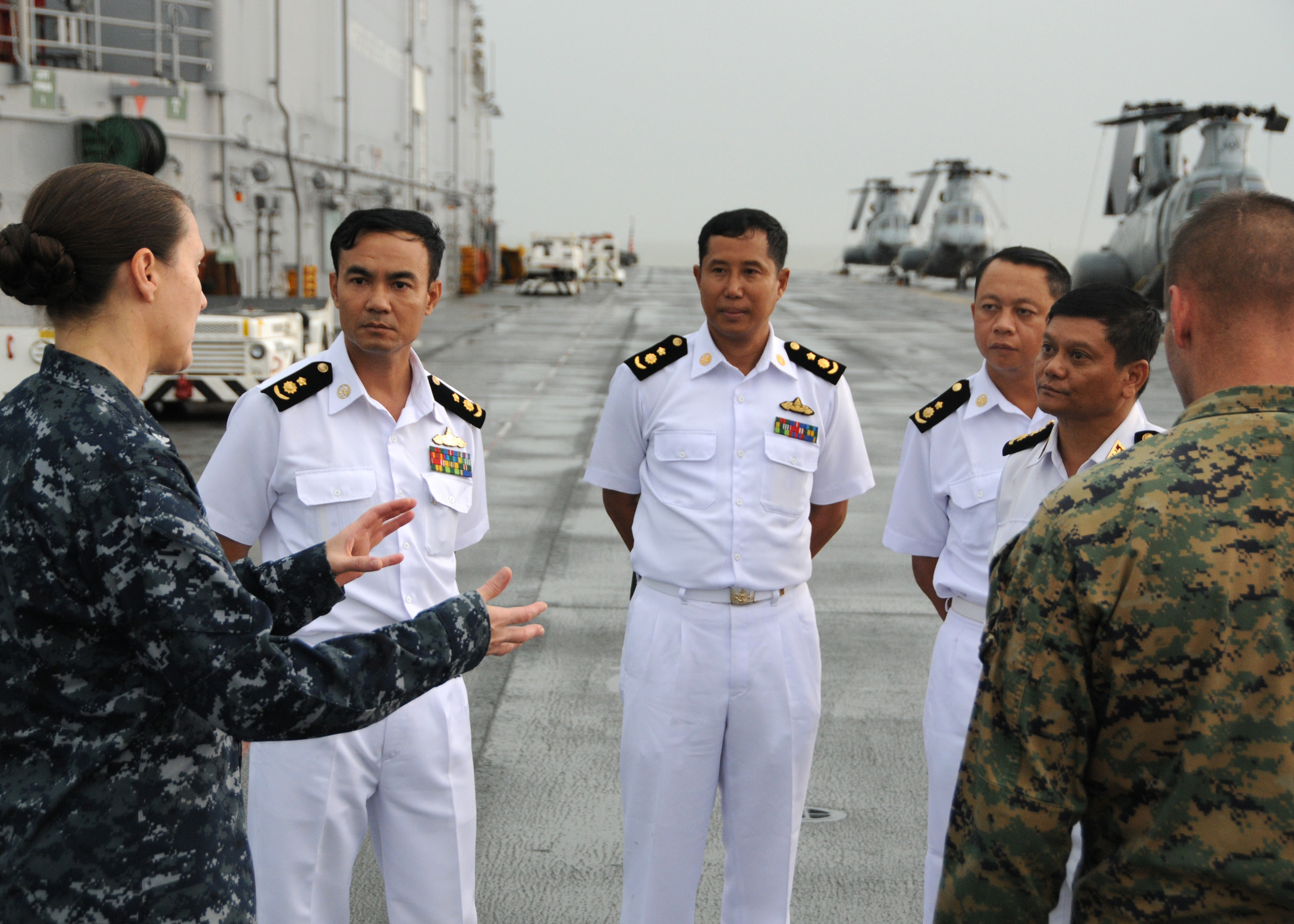
Myanmar Navy officers tour USS Bonhomme Richard

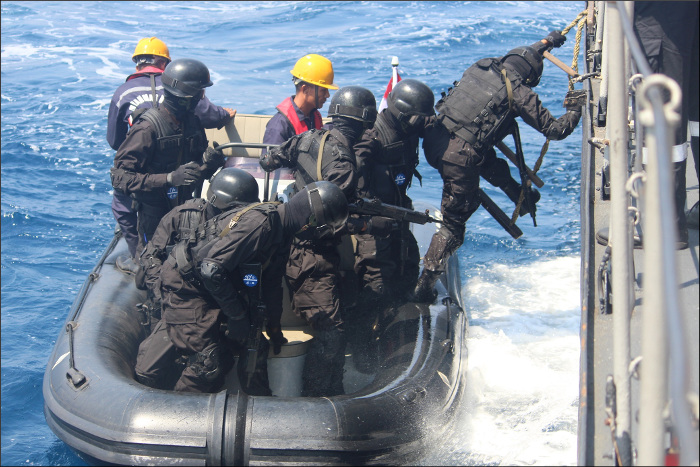
A navy exercise at Coco Islands

As part of international engagement of the US with the Myanmar's armed forces, the USS Bonhomme Richard (LHD-6) visited Myanmar in early 2013.

In 2014, the Myanmar Navy began its annual 'Sea Shield' combined fleet exercise in the Bay of Bengal and the Andaman Sea. The annual manoeuvres usually involved live-fire exercises by several of the Myanmar Navy's strategic vessels.

The navy participated in the Indian and Myanmar Navy Exercise 2018, held in the Bay of Bengal. On the Burmese side, vessels included the Kyan Sittha-class frigate UMS Sin Phyu Shin (F-14) and offshore patrol vessel UMS Inle and on the Indian side, vessels included anti-submarine warfare corvette INS Kamorta, Shivalik (Project 17)-class frigate INS Sahyadri, and a Type 877EKM Kilo-class submarine, along with one helicopter and two advanced aircraft. In September 2019, Myanmar Navy's UMS Kyan Sittha participated in the first US-Asean Maritime Exercise (AUMX) to improve disaster management and maritime cooperation in the region.

The navy has maintained relationships with regional navies. It has hosted navies from the region such as the Royal Australian Navy, the PLA Navy and the Indian Navy. Likewise, the navy's ships have visited countries in the region including Vietnam, Thailand and Singapore.

== Organisation ==
=== Administrative and support units ===
- Naval headquarters, Ministry of Defence (Naypyidaw)
- Naval Shipyard (Yangon)
- Strategic Naval Command (headquarters in Naypyidaw)
- Central Naval Command (Seikkyi)
- Naval Training Command (Seikkyi)
- Central Naval Hydrographic Depot (Yangon)
- Central Naval Diving and Salvage Depot (Yangon)
- Central Naval Engineering Depot (Botataung, Yangon)
- Central Naval Logistic Depot (Yangon)
- Central Naval Communications Depot (Yangon)
- Central Naval Armaments Deport (Seikkyi)

=== Naval regional commands and bases ===
- Irrawaddy Regional Command (headquarters in Yangon) - Commodore Zaw Oo
  - Thanhklyet Soon Naval Base
  - Thanlyin Naval Base
  - Thilawa Naval Base
  - Coco Island Base (including Naval Radar Unit)
- Danyawaddy Regional Command (headquarters in Sittwe) - Commodore Khin Zaw
  - Kyaukpyu Naval Base
  - Thandwe (Sandoway) Naval Base
  - No.(71) Submarine Base (Ownchein Island) which was established in 2007. It is near Kyaukphyu SEZ.
- Panmawaddy Regional Command (headquarters on Haigyi Island) - Commodore Myat Min
- Mawyawaddy Regional Command (headquarters in Mawlamyine) - Commodore Aung Myo Hlaing
- Tanintharyi Regional Command (headquarters in Myeik) - Commodore Kyaw Swar Htet
  - Zadetkyi Island Naval Base
  - Mali Kyun (Tavoy Island) Naval Base
  - Palai Island Naval Base
  - Kadan Naval Base
  - Sakanthit Naval Base
  - Lambi Naval Base
  - Pearl Island Naval Base
  - Zadetkale Naval Base (Radar Unit)

=== Naval infantry ===
The Myanmar Navy formed a naval infantry battalion of 800 men in 1964, and a second battalion in 1967. They battalions traditionally are deployed mainly in the Arakan, Tenasserim, and Irrawaddy delta coastal regions primarily to assist in the army's counter-insurgency operations (COIN).

=== Navy SEALs ===
The Myanmar Navy Sea, Air and Land (SEAL) Teams, commonly known as Myanmar Navy SEALs (တပ်မတော် (ရေ) အထူးစစ်ဆင်ရေးတပ်ဖွဲ့) were probably formed in the early 2010s. The Myanmar Navy SEALs are particularly trained for special operation missions such as hostage rescue, counter-terrorism and counter narcotic operations. The selection process and training curriculum is claimed to be similar to United States Navy SEAL selection and training. The Myanmar Navy SEALs are officially known as the Myanmar Navy Special Operations Task Force.

=== Naval base air defence force ===
Previously, Myanmar Naval air defence forces used Bofors 40mm & ZPU-2 AAA for naval bases.

== Rank structure ==
Cap badges

Officers

NCOs & ORs

=== Commissioned officer ranks ===
The rank insignia of commissioned officers.

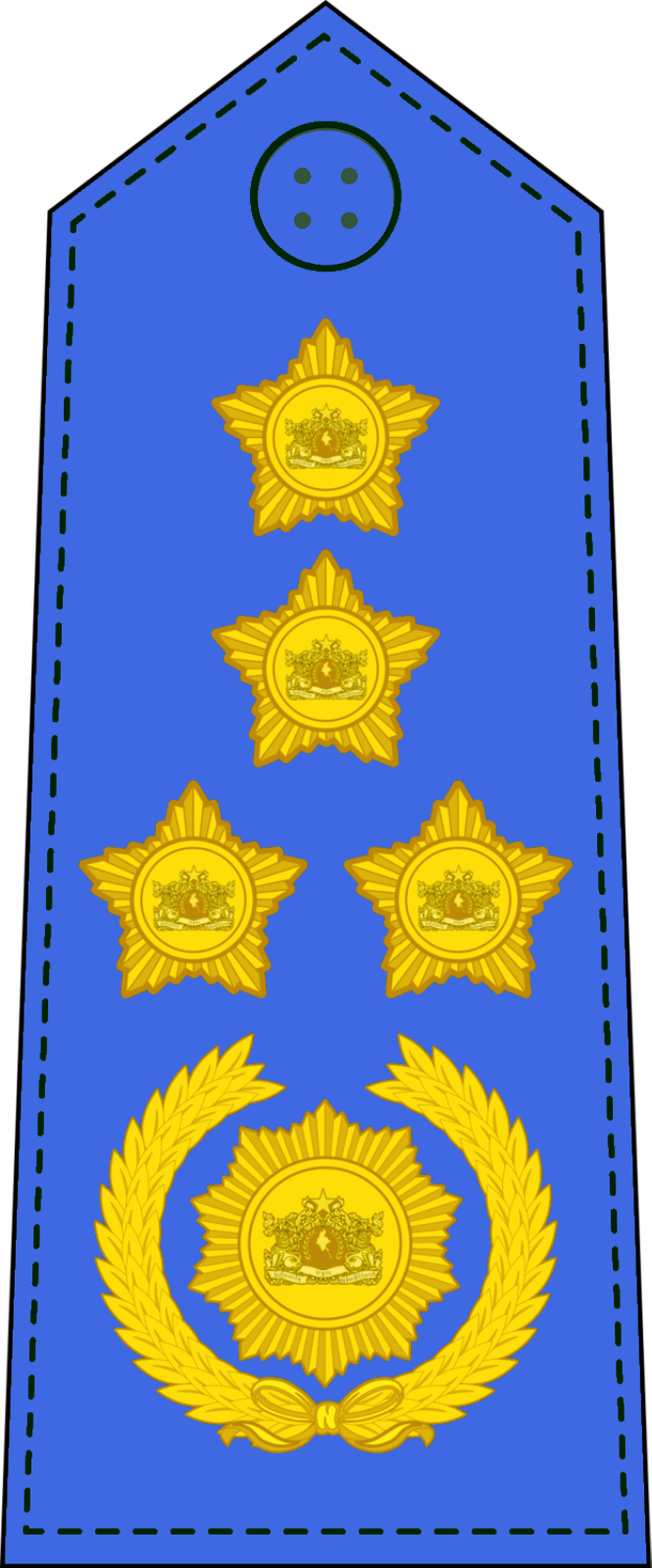
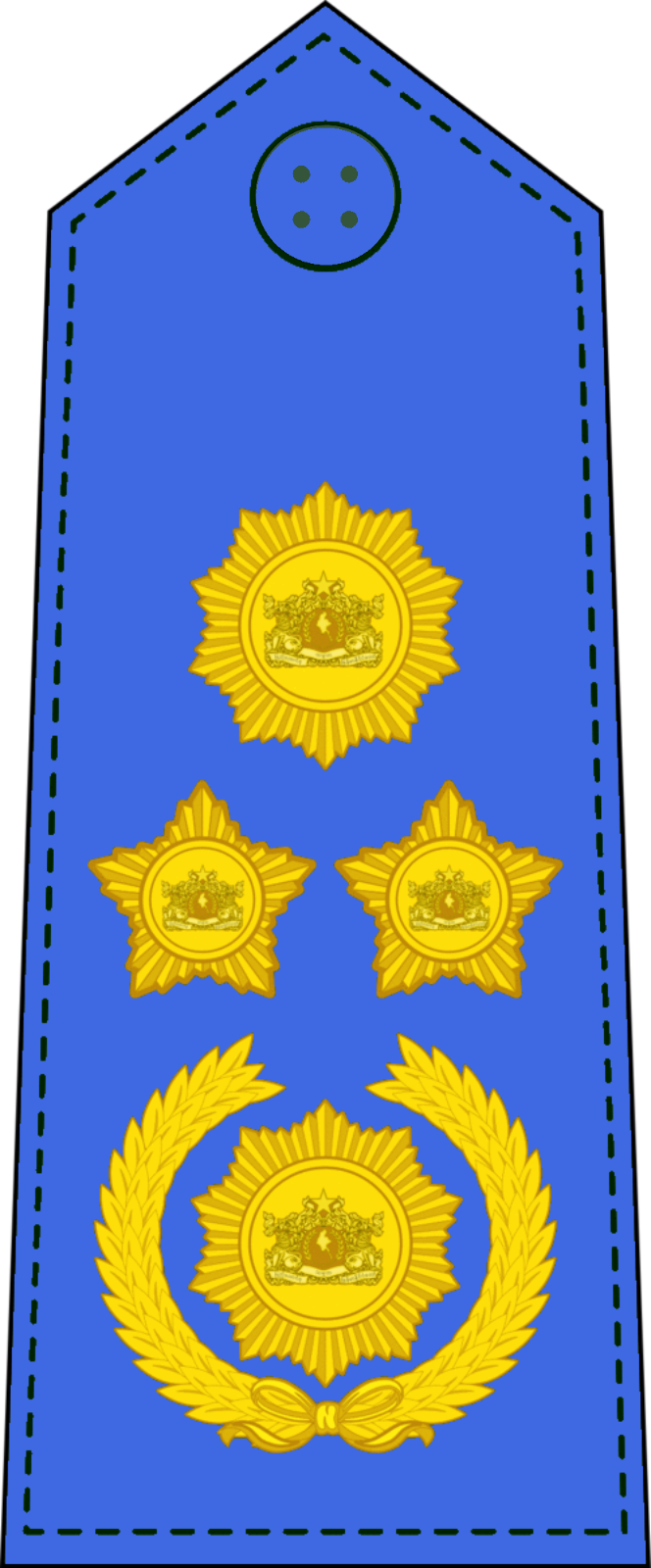
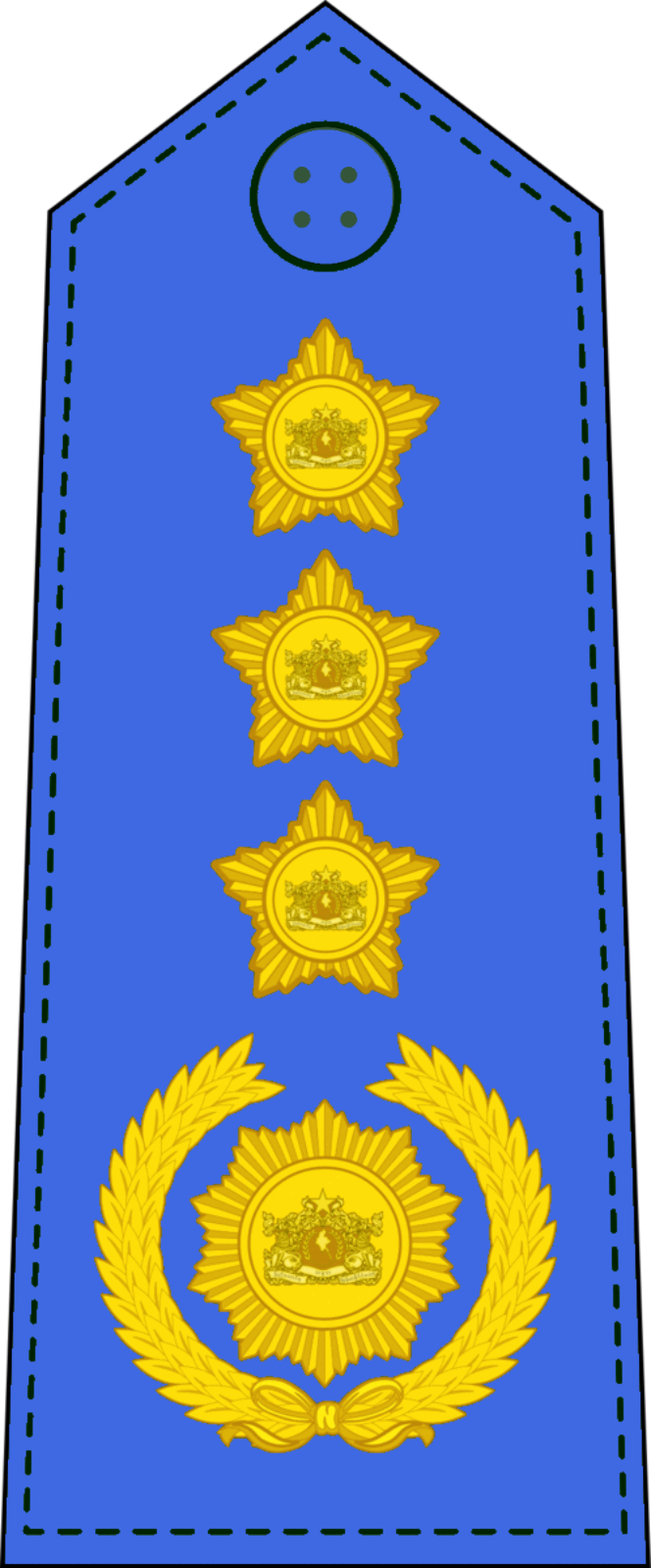
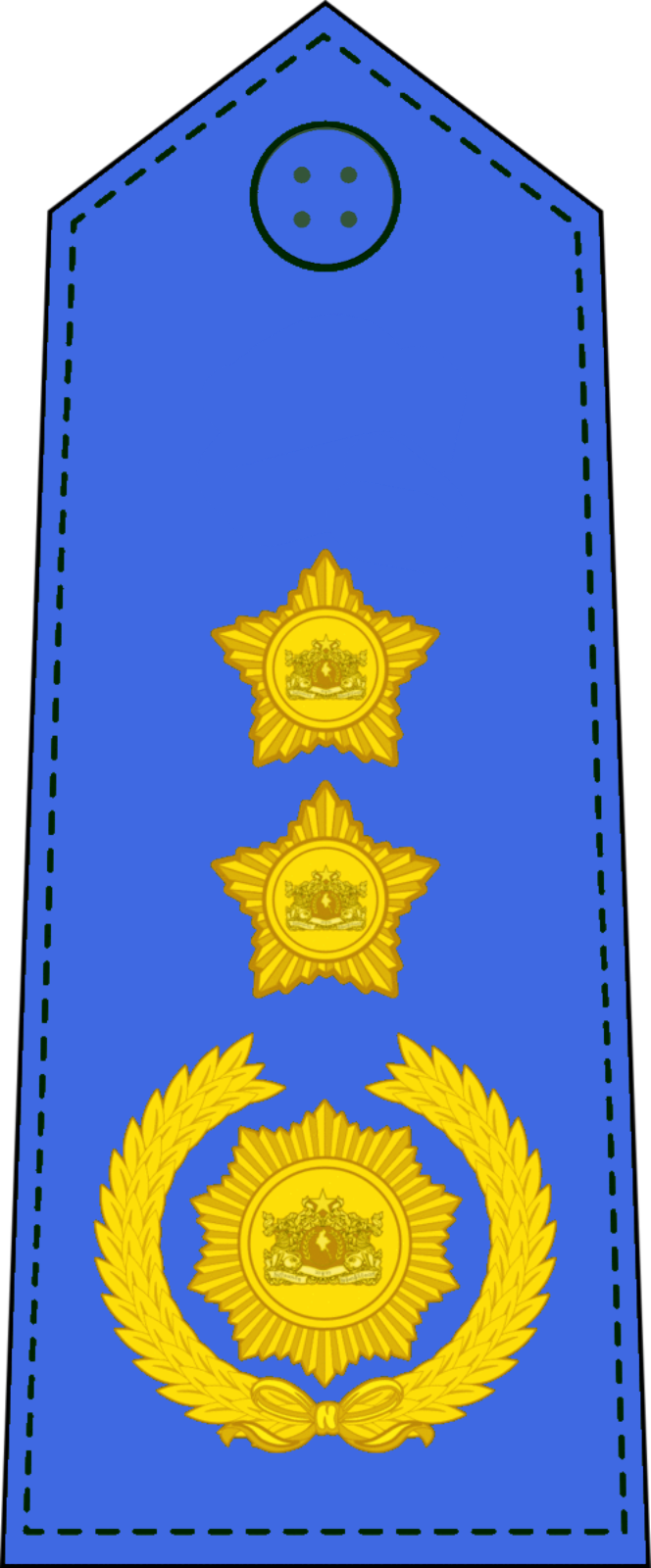
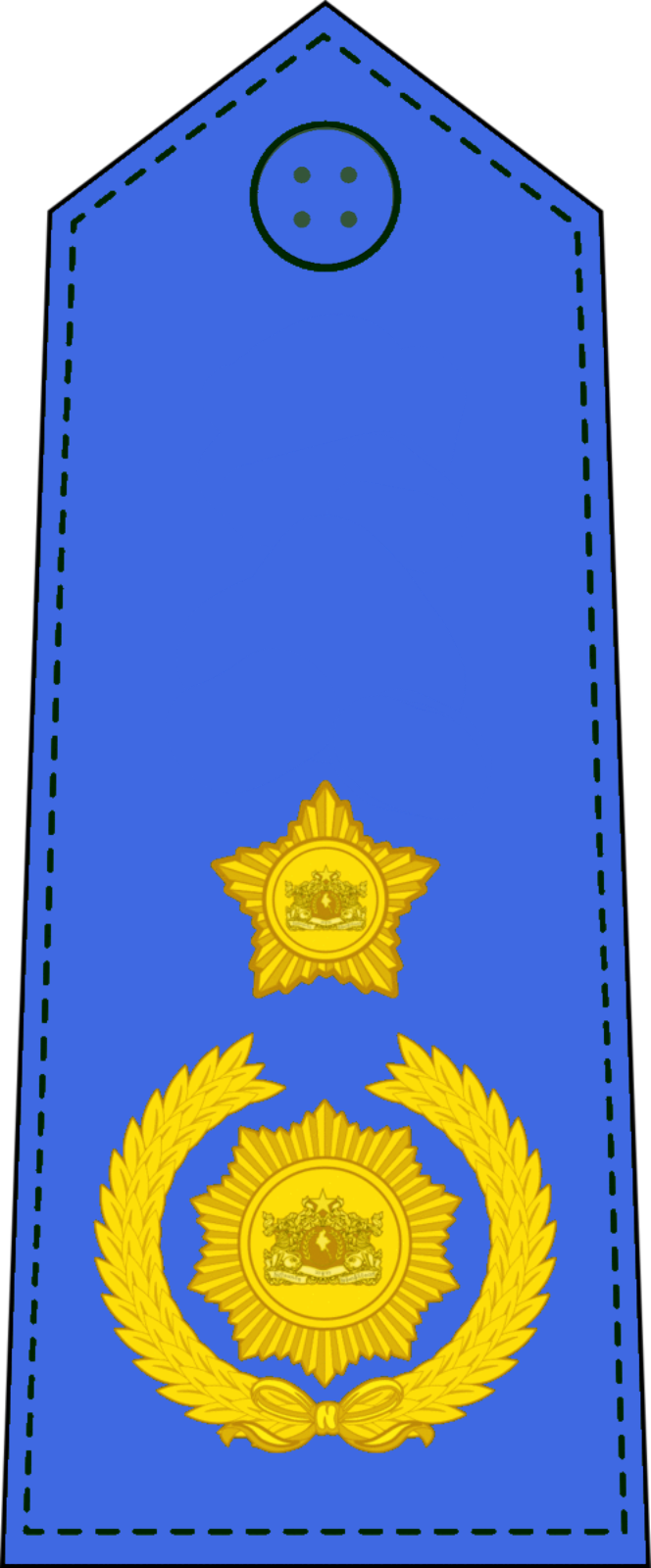
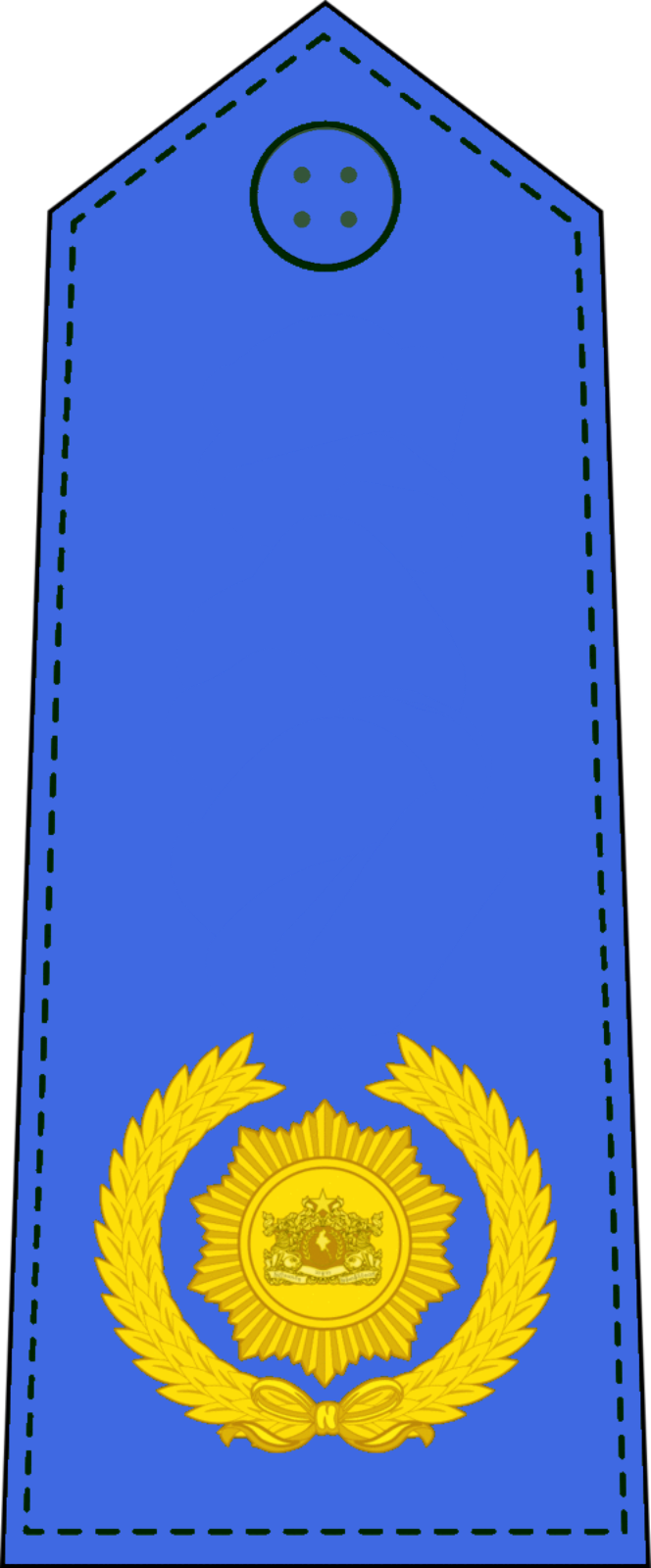
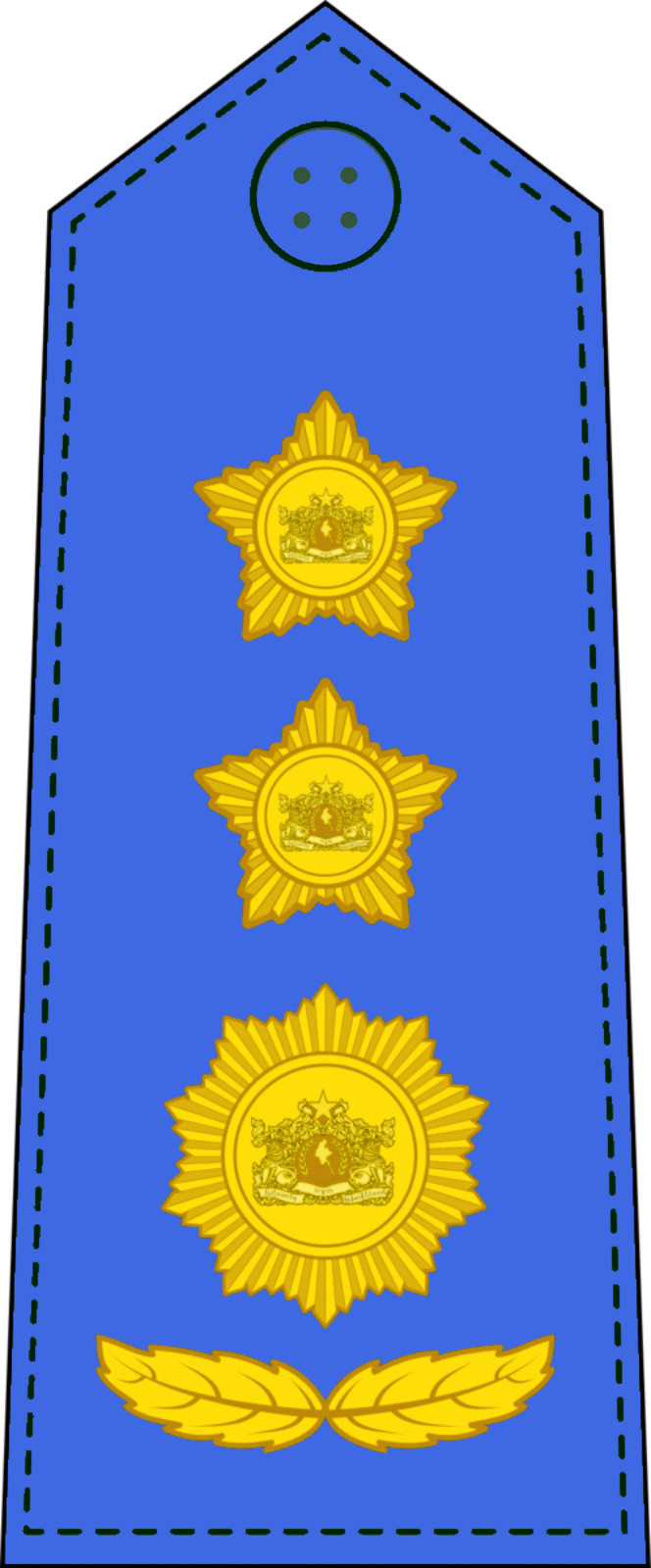
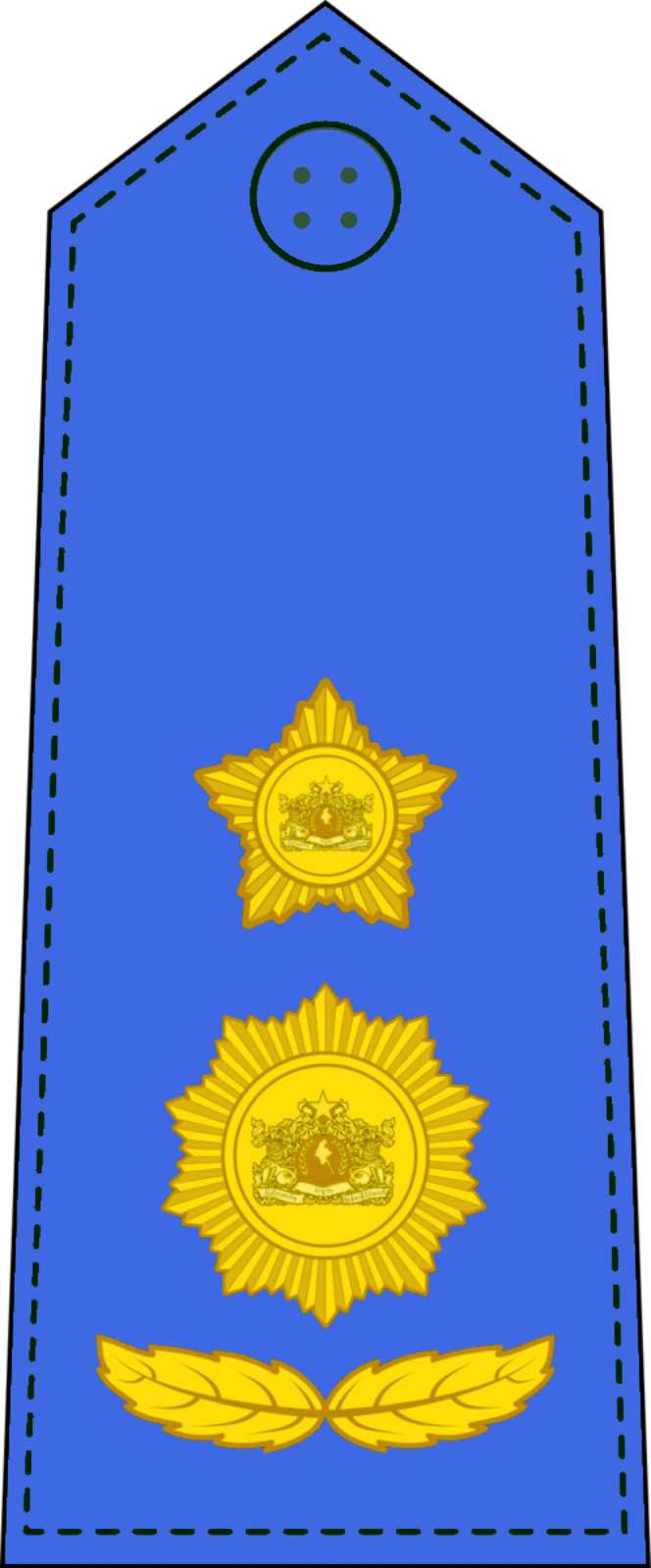
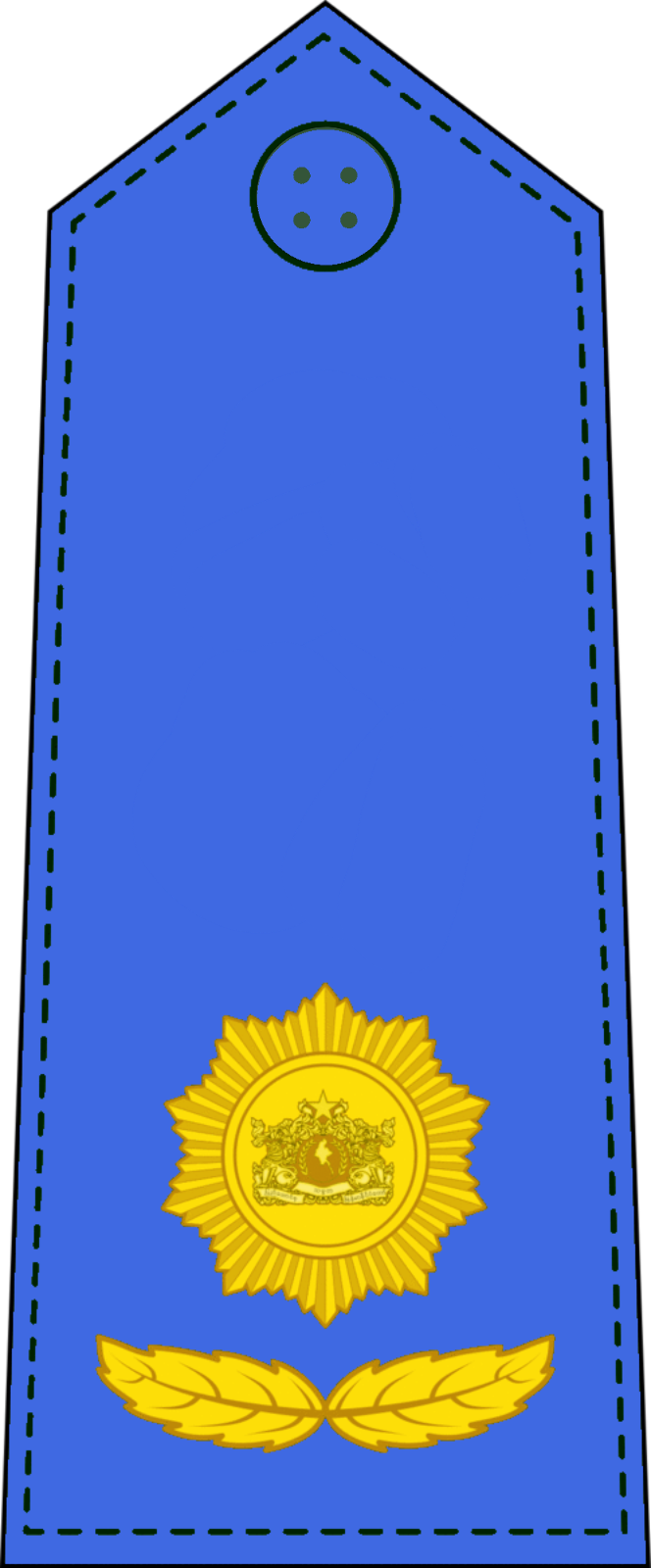
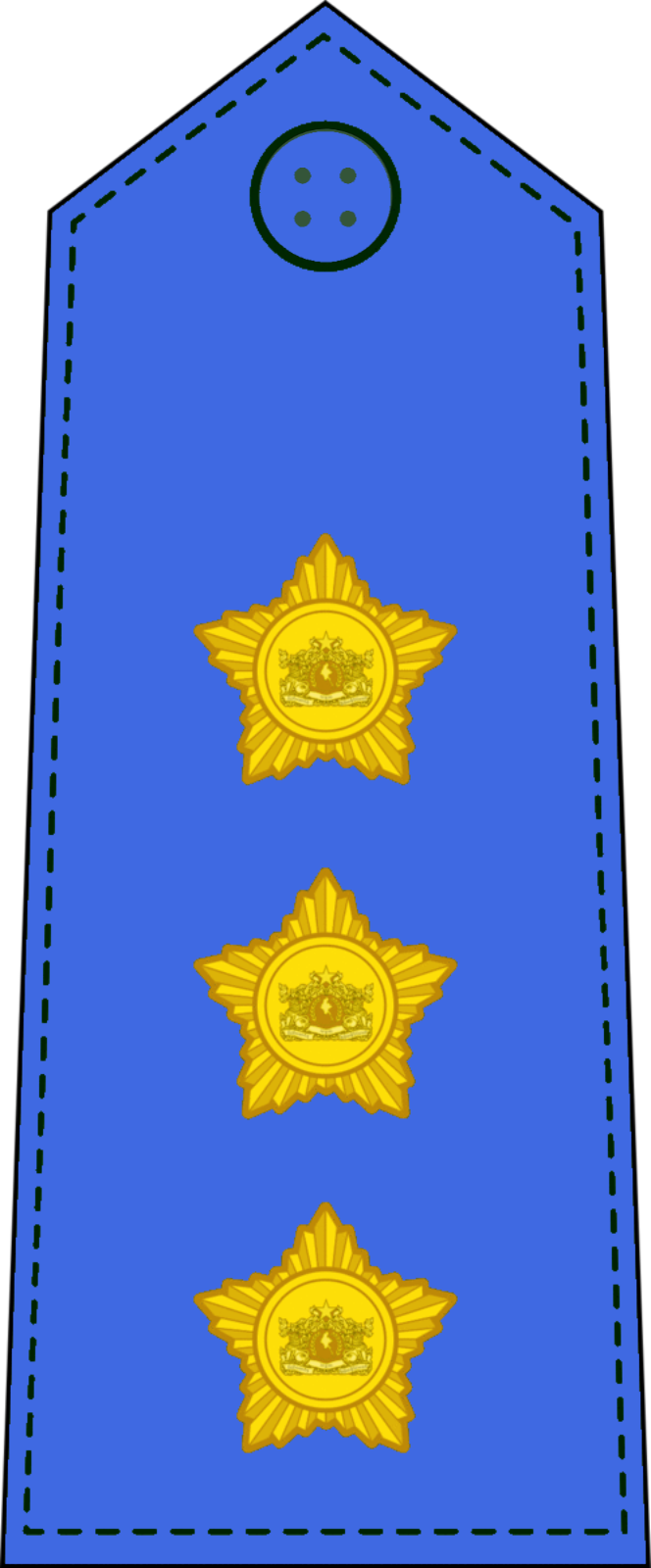
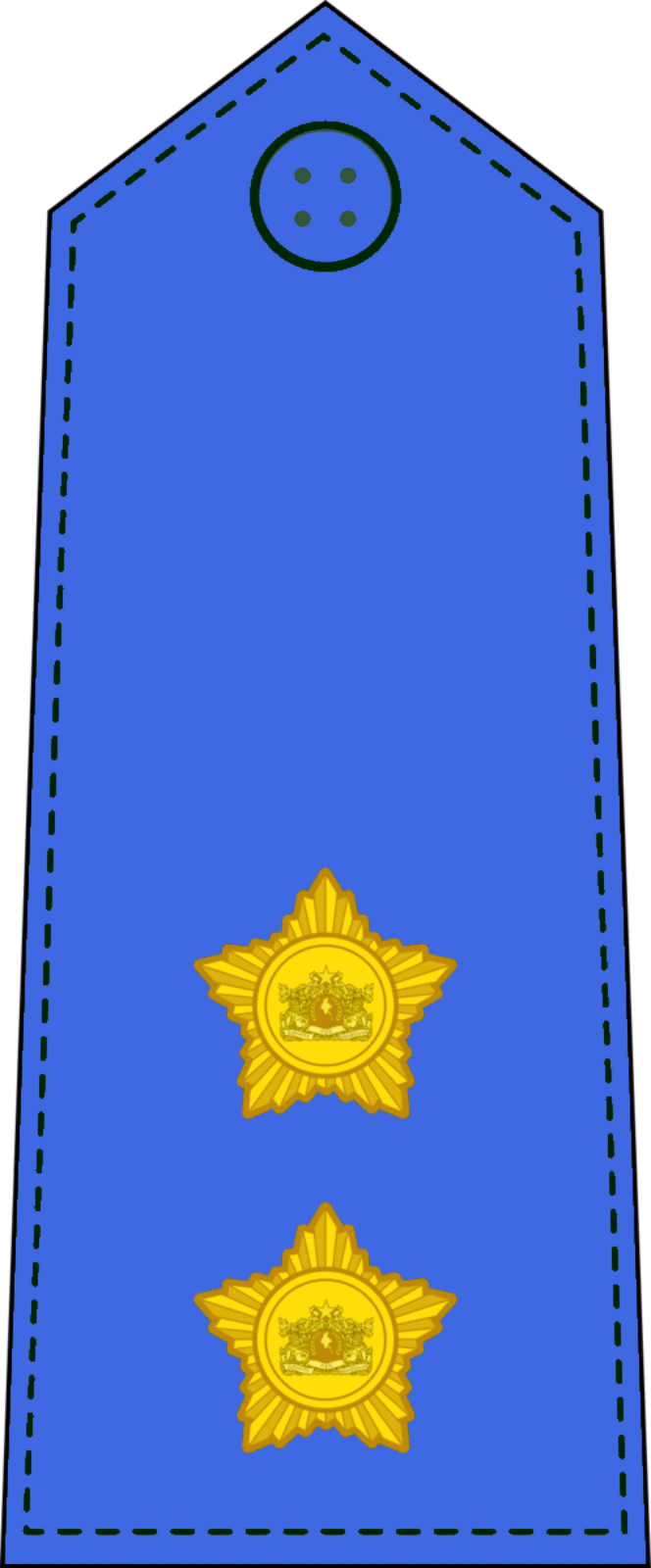
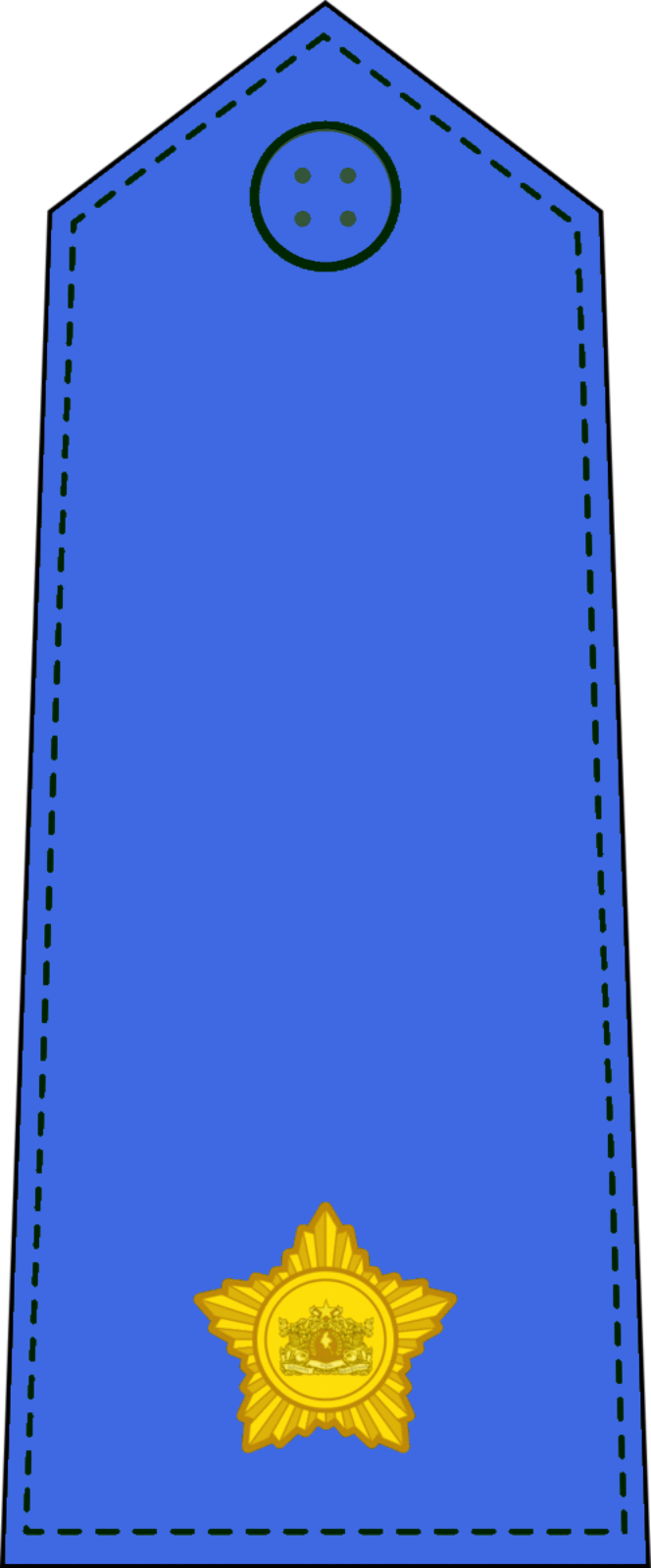
Rank group	General / flag officers						Senior officers			Junior officers
Myanmar Navy
Myanmar Navy	ဗိုလ်ချုပ်မှူးကြီး bogyok hmūgyī	ဒုတိယ ဗိုလ်ချုပ်မှူးကြီး dụtịyạ bogyok hmūgyī	ဗိုလ်ချုပ်ကြီး bogyok kyī	ဒုတိယ ဗိုလ်ချုပ်ကြီး dụtịyạ bogyok kyī	ဗိုလ်ချုပ် bogyok	ဗိုလ်မှူးချုပ် bohmūgyok	ဗိုလ်မှူးကြီး bohmūgyī	ဒုတိယ ဗိုလ်မှူးကြီး dụtịyạ bohmūgyī	ဗိုလ်မှူး bohmū	ဗိုလ်ကြီး bogyī	ဗိုလ် bo	ဒုတိယ ဗိုလ် dụtịyạ bo

=== Other ranks ===
The rank insignia of non-commissioned officers and enlisted personnel.

Rank group	Senior NCOs				Junior NCOs		Enlisted
Myanmar Navy							No insignia	No insignia
Myanmar Navy	အရာခံဗိုလ် ’araākhaṃ bauilaʻ	ဒုတိယအရာခံဗိုလ် dautaiya ’araākhaṃ bauilaʻ	အုပ်ခွဲတပ်ကြပ်ကြီး aupaʻ khavai tapaʻ karpaʻ karīʺ	တပ်ကြပ်ကြီး tapaʻ karpaʻ karīʺ	တပ်ကြပ် tapaʻ karpaʻ	ဒုတိယတပ်ကြပ် dautaiya tapaʻ karpaʻ	တပ်သား tapaʻ saāʺ	တပ်သားသစ် tapaʻ saāʺ sacaʻ

== Equipment ==
=== Modernisation ===
The Myanmar Navy has undertaken a modernisation program since the early 2000s. It has added larger and more advanced ships, mostly by constructing them locally with foreign supplied equipment.

=== Frigates ===
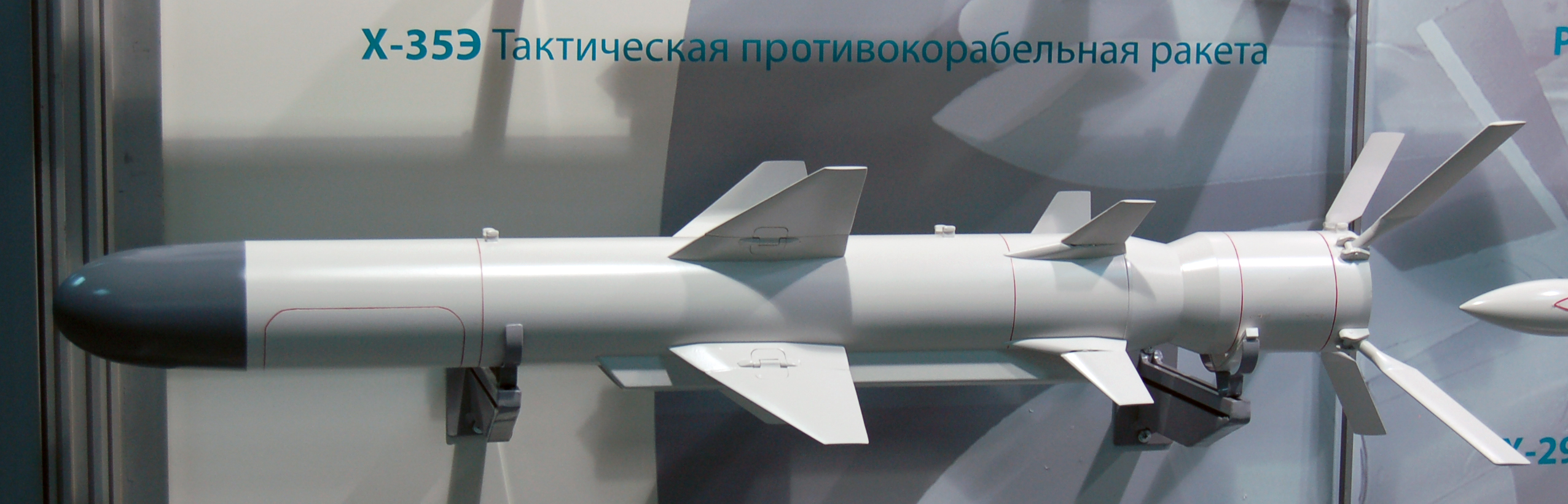
Russian made Kh-35E anti-ship missile

The Myanmar Navy started its modernization program in 2001 in an attempt to replace older ships and equipment. In 2012, the navy took delivery of two Type 053H1-class frigates from China. These two ships were upgraded extensively. Upgrades included the replacing of HY 2 anti-ship missiles by C-802 missiles and installing new sensors. The first indigenous frigate, the Aung Zeya entered service in 2011 and took part in a joint exercise with Indian Navy ships off Visakhapatnam in early 2013. A second ship, Kyan Sittha entered service in 2012 and is the navy's first stealth frigate. The navy plans to build six indigenous frigates; combining Russian, Indian, Chinese, and Western weapons systems. These ships are equipped with Kh-35E anti-ship missiles, OTO Melara 76 mm Super Rapid Cannons, AK-630 6-barrel 30mm close-in weapon system (CIWS) and Chinese ASW rockets and torpedoes. Radars and electronic systems are mainly from Bharat Electronics of India. Myanmar acquired surface-to-air missiles and anti-ship missiles from China for its newly built frigates and OPVs. Myanmar Navy Shipyard built with Chinese assistance in the late 1990s is one of the most modern shipyards in the region. Many Burmese naval engineers underwent shipbuilding training in China and Russia.

=== Submarines ===
In 2020, the navy acquired its first submarine, a Soviet era Sindhughosh/Kilo-class submarine, from India. The former INS Sindhuvir (S58) was refitted by Hindustan Shipyard Limited before the handover. Now renamed UMS Minye Theinkhathu, the submarine is to be used for training. It was first seen publicly on 15 October 2020 as part of a naval fleet exercise ('Bandoola 2020'). The Indian Navy is going to assist in training Myanmar to operate the submarine effectively.

On 24 December 2021, Myanmar Navy has commissioned its second submarine the UMS Minye Kyaw Htin, a type 35B Ming-class submarine from China.

=== Others ===
Between 2015 and 2017, the Myanmar Navy procured two Super Dvora Mk III patrol boats from Israel. Next, under a US$37.9 million deal signed in March 2017, the Myanmar Navy received the advanced anti-submarine torpedo Shyena units from India. Moreover, the Myanmar Navy acquired a new landing platform dock (LPD) from South Korea in 2019.

== Gallery ==
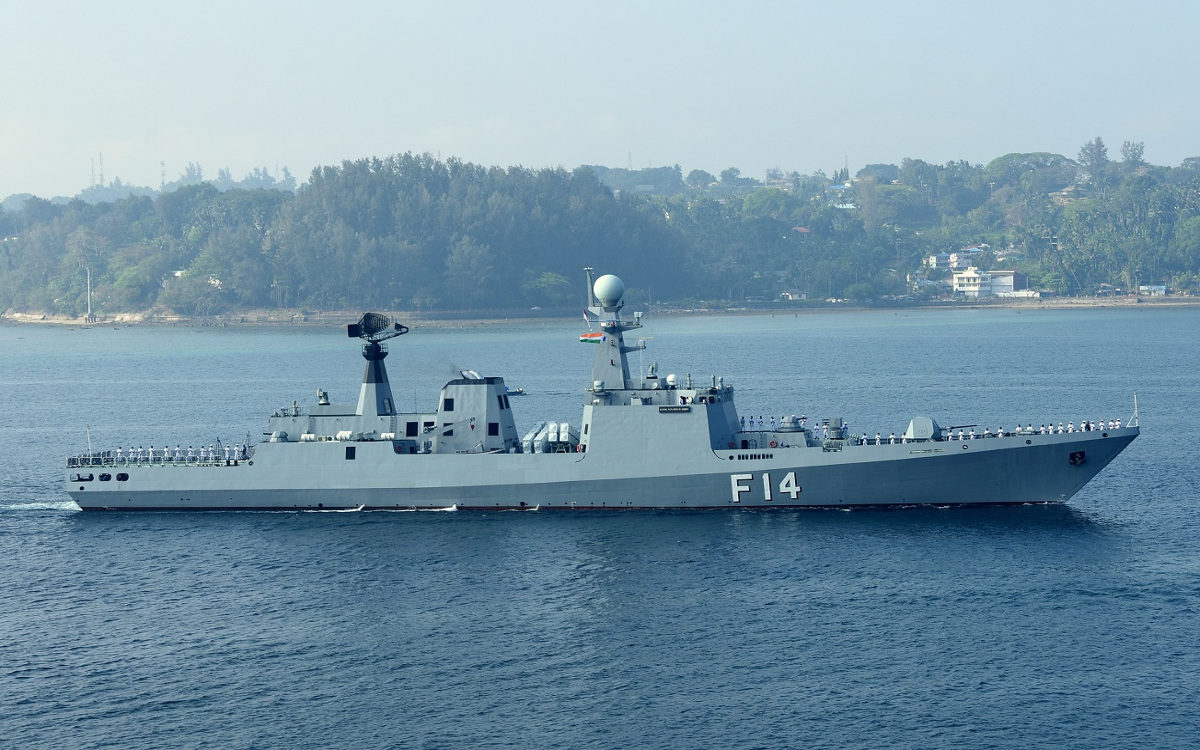
UMS King Sin Phyu Shin

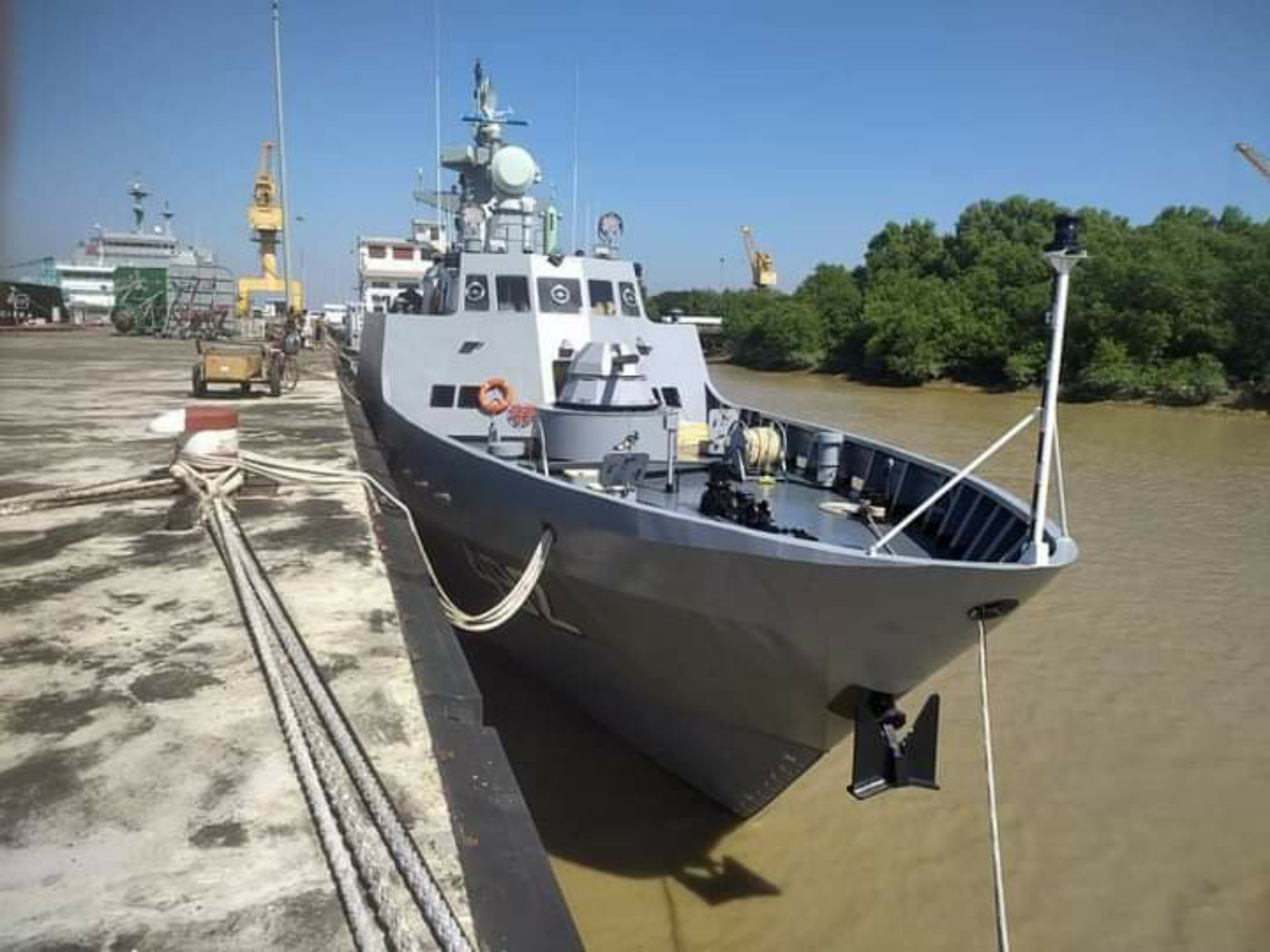
FAC(M) 492 of Myanmar Navy

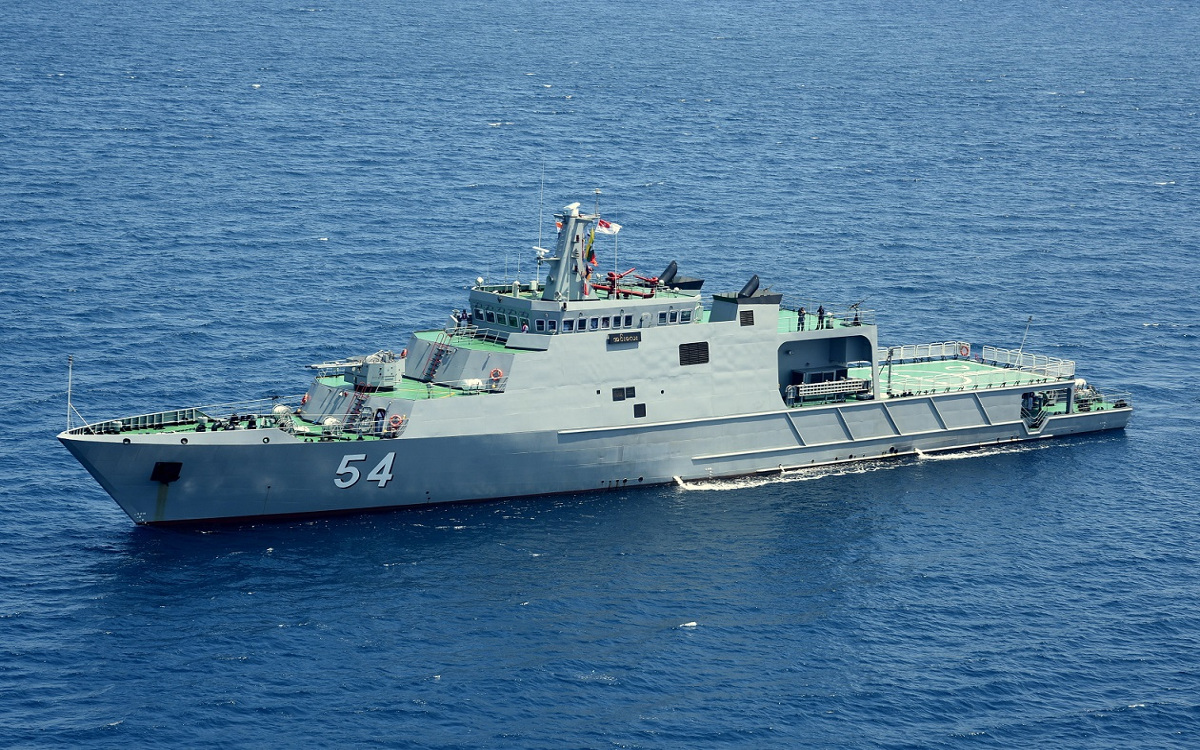
UMS Inlay

== See also ==
- Myanmar Army
- Myanmar Air Force
- Office of the Chief of Military Security Affairs
- Myanmar Police Force
