= Mountbatten pink =

Naval camouflage colour

Color coordinates
- Hex triplet: #997A8D
- sRGB^{B} (r, g, b): (153, 122, 141)
- HSV (h, s, v): (323°, 20%, 60%)
- CIELCh_{uv} (L, C, h): (55, 20, 328°)
- ISCC–NBS descriptor: Greyish mauve
- B: Normalized to [0–255] (byte)

Mountbatten pink
#997A8D

Mountbatten pink, also called Plymouth Pink, is a naval camouflage colour resembling greyish mauve. It was first used by Lord Mountbatten of the British Royal Navy during World War II. After noticing a Union-Castle Line ship with a similar camouflage colour disappearing from sight, he applied the colour to his own ships, believing the colour would render his ships difficult to see during dawn and dusk. While the colour was met with anecdotal success, it was judged by experts to be equivalent to neutral greys at best and would make ships with the colour more obvious at worst.

== History ==
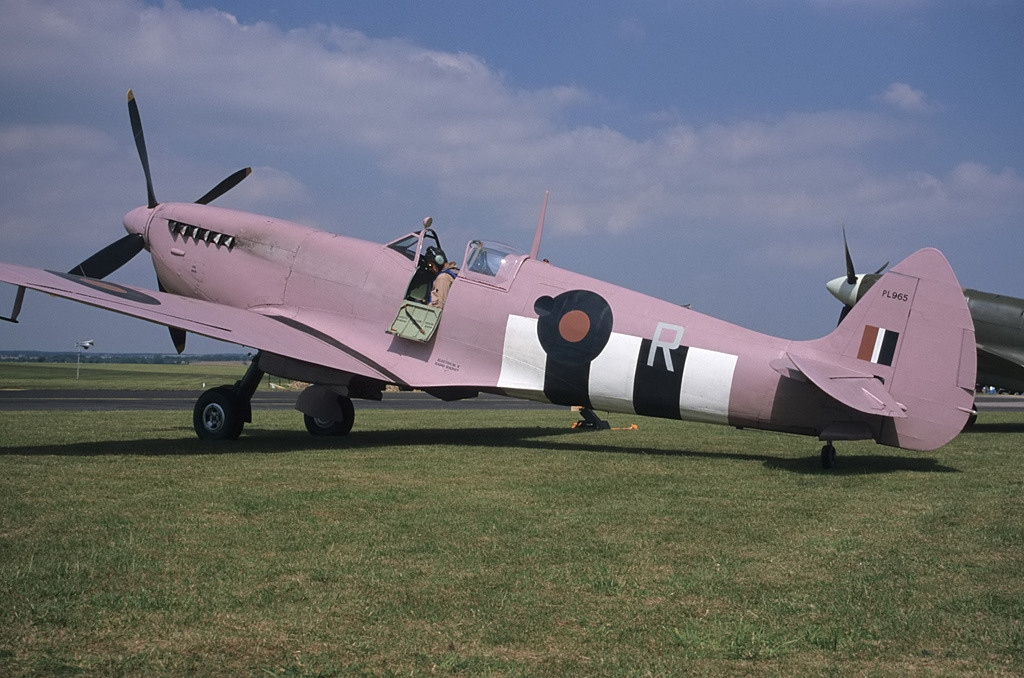
Spitfire with mountbatten pink camouflage applied

In 1940, while escorting a convoy, Lord Mountbatten noted that one ship in the group vanished from view much earlier than the remainder. The ship, a Union-Castle liner, was painted lavender mauve grey. Mountbatten thus became convinced of the colour's effectiveness as a camouflage during dawn and dusk, often dangerous times for ships, and had all of the destroyers of his flotilla painted with a similar pigment, which he created by mixing a medium grey with a small amount of Venetian red. By early 1941, several other ships began using the same camouflage, though no formal testing was done to determine how well it worked.

A later refinement of the basic Mountbatten pink camouflage was the use of a slightly lighter tone of the same colour for the upper structures of the ship. By the end of 1942, however, all vessels of destroyer size and larger had dispensed with Mountbatten pink, although it is believed that smaller vessels retained this colour until well into 1944. The primary problem with Mountbatten pink was that it stood out around midday, when the sky was no longer pink, and the traditional battleship grey was much less visible.

The US Navy had experimented with a similar shade of paint as well, and at least one ship, the USS Winslow, received such a paint scheme.

The Kriegsmarine likewise experimented with a light pink shade. The Royal Navy prisoner interrogation report of crew rescued from S 147, a Schnellboot sunk in the English Channel in April 1944, states they believed the boat's overall pink shade was effective.

== Usefulness ==
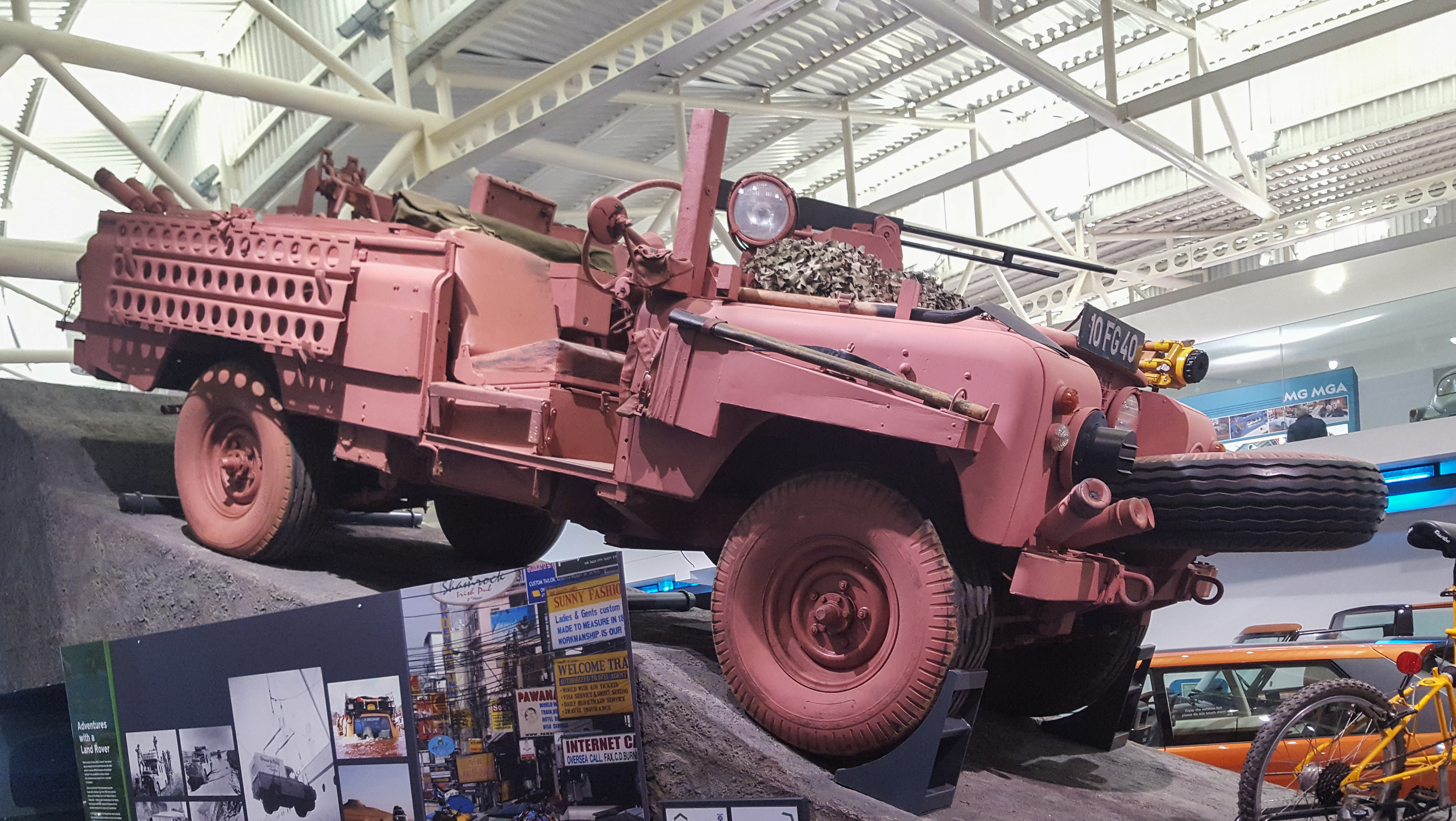
"Pink Panther", famous SAS vehicle, as was used during Dhofar Rebellion

One of the anecdotal and possibly apocryphal tales told in support of Mountbatten pink was the story of the cruiser HMS Kenya (nicknamed "The Pink Lady" at the time due to her Mountbatten pink paint), which during Operation Archery covered a commando raid against installations on Vågsøy Island off the Norwegian coast in 1941. The Germans fired on the Kenya for several minutes with coastal guns but she sustained only minor damage from near misses. This was attributed to her Mountbatten pink camouflage blending in with the pink marker dye the Germans were using in their shells, preventing German spotters from distinguishing between shell splashes and the ship. Stories like this, and personal experience of ships with the colour disappearing from view, made crews of ships with the colour notable supporters.

Camouflage experts have noted that the colour may make ships more obvious as a result of the Purkinje effect. These experts also often complained about uncontrolled mixing, which could result in mixtures containing more red than intended; such a mixture could be disastrous, as ships with even the slightest red tone attracted more attention than those with an equivalent tone of blue in almost every light level. An Admiralty handbook concluded that the paint was "neither more nor less effective in sea-going camouflage than neutral greys of equivalent tone; and, further, that if the red content were high enough for the particular characteristics of red to have any effect, the colour would generally hinder rather than aid concealment".
