= Ship camouflage =

Form of military deception

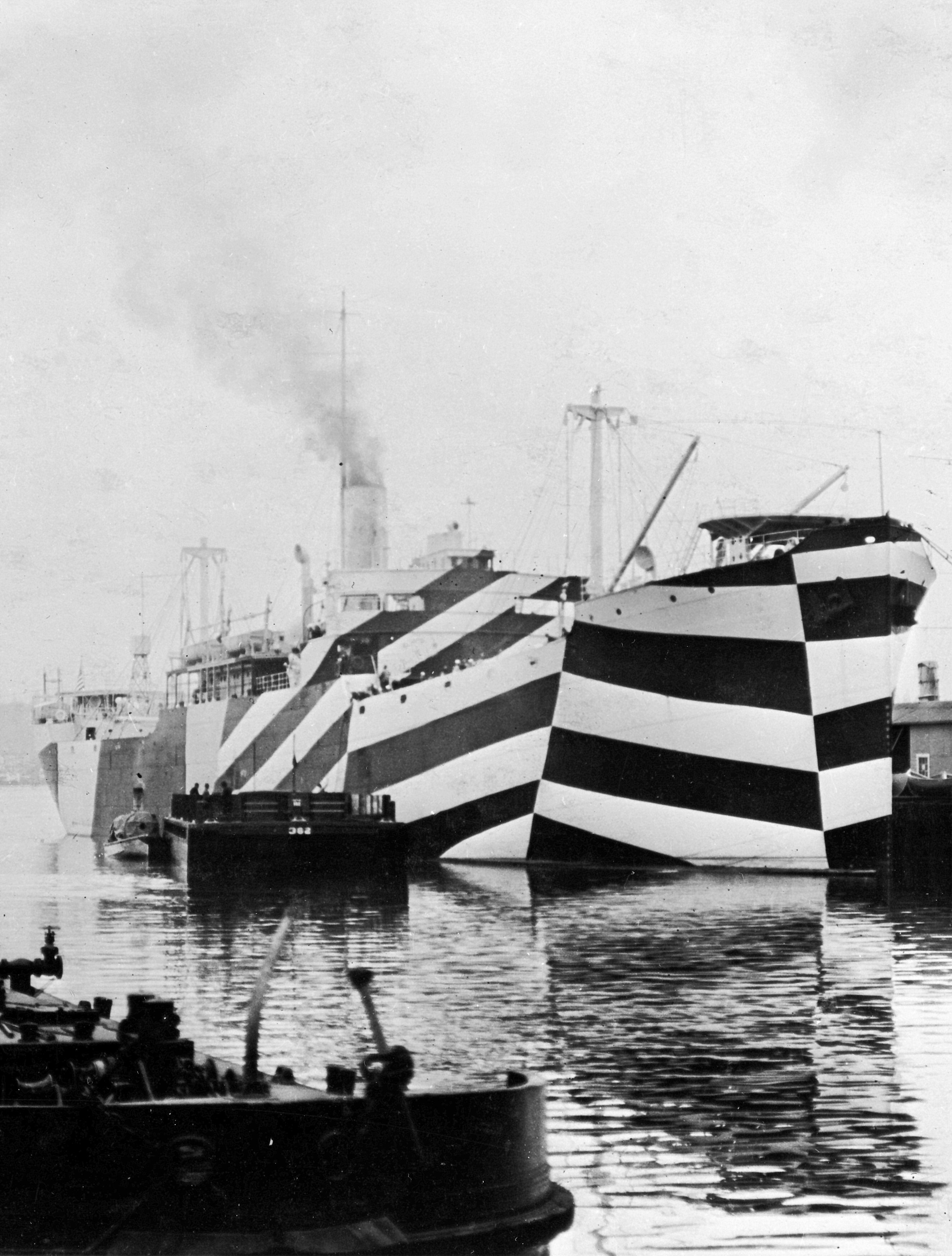
USS West Mahomet in First World War dazzle camouflage

Ship camouflage is a form of military deception in which a ship is painted in one or more colors in order to obscure or confuse an enemy's visual observation. Several types of marine camouflage have been used or prototyped: blending or crypsis, in which a paint scheme attempts to hide a ship from view; deception, in which a ship is made to look smaller or, as with the Q-ships, to mimic merchantmen; and dazzle, a chaotic paint scheme which tries to confuse any estimate of distance, direction, or heading. Counterillumination, to hide a darkened ship against the slightly brighter night sky, was trialled by the Royal Canadian Navy in diffused lighting camouflage.

Ships were sometimes camouflaged in classical times. Mediterranean pirate ships were sometimes painted blue-gray for concealment. Vegetius records that Julius Caesar's scout ships were painted bluish-green when gathering intelligence along the coast of Britain during the Gallic Wars. Ships were sometimes painted deceptively during the Age of Sail, while both sides in the American Civil War camouflaged their ships, whether to run blockades or for night reconnaissance.

Ship camouflage was used in earnest by the British Admiralty in the First World War. The marine artist Norman Wilkinson led research into dazzle camouflage, resulting in the painting of thousands of British and later American ships in dazzle patterns. He intended it not to make ships invisible, nor even to cause the enemy to miss his shot, but to deceive him into taking up a poor firing position. In the Second World War, dazzle was revisited by the Royal Navy and the United States Navy, and applied to a limited extent by other navies.

After the Second World War, radar made painted camouflage less effective, though inshore craft continue to use camouflage schemes alongside anti-radar stealth.

== Early use ==
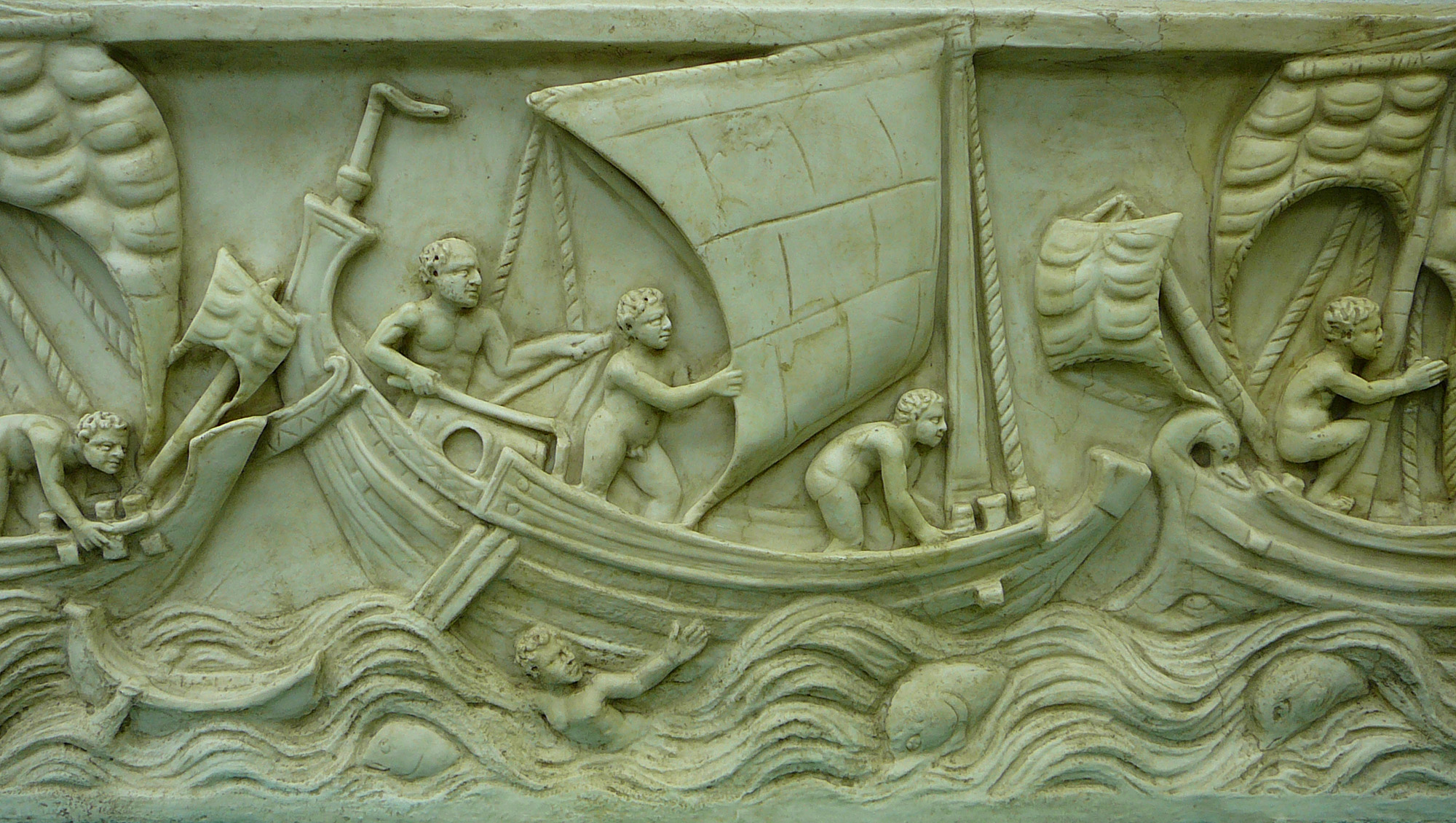
Roman ships, depicted on a 3rd Century AD sarcophagus

Ship camouflage was occasionally used in ancient times. The 3rd century book Imagines notes that Mediterranean pirate ships were sometimes painted blue-gray for concealment. Vegetius writing in the 4th century says that "Venetian blue" (bluish-green, the same color as the sea) was used in the years 56–54 BC during the Gallic Wars, when Julius Caesar sent his speculatoria navigia (scout ships) to gather intelligence along the coast of Britain. The ships were painted entirely in bluish-green wax, with sails and ropes the same color. The sailors and marines were also dressed in "Venetian blue".

In the Age of Sail, deception was often used by ships, and paint was applied ad hoc by ships' captains for temporary tactical advantage. A ship might be painted to look like another, it might have its cannon ports hidden by painted canvas to look harmless, or it might have additional cannon ports painted on to appear more powerful. For example, in one of his battles between 1778 and 1782, American privateer Jonathan Haraden hid the guns of his ship General Pickering to appear as if it were a slow merchant ship. Haraden allowed his ship to be approached at close range by a much faster British privateer, then he quickly pulled the painted canvas away and delivered a full broadside, capturing the ship.

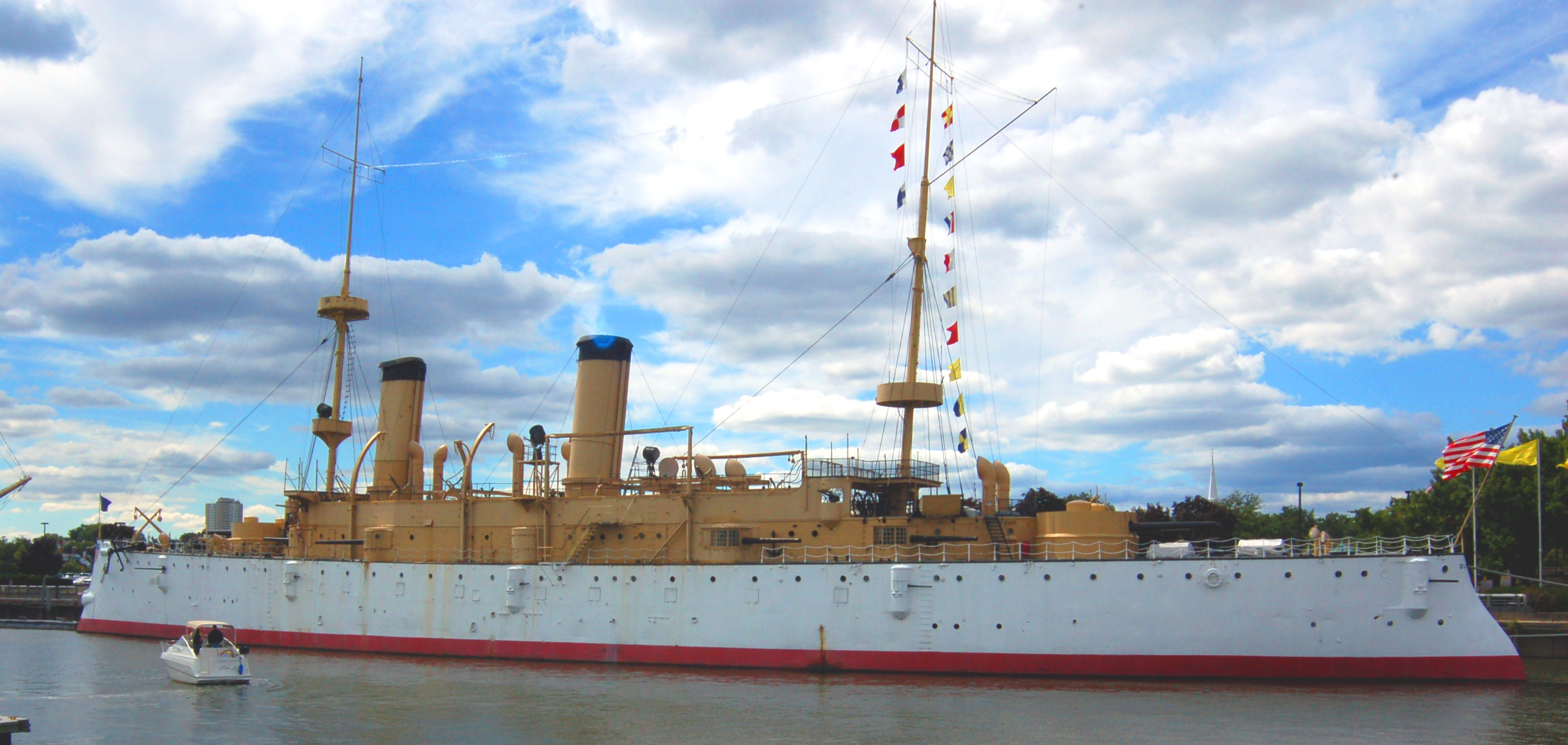
USS Olympia

In the American Civil War, camouflage paint was applied by both sides during the Union blockade of 1861–1865. Blockade runners aiding the Confederates sometimes painted their ships all in mist-gray, to hide themselves in coastal fog. One Union blockade crew may have painted their rowboat and its oars white and wore white clothing for a night reconnaissance patrol up an enemy-held river.

In the 1890s, German and French fighting ships were being painted gray. American interest in ship camouflage was given official funding in 1898 during the Spanish–American War when white, light gray, and medium gray paint schemes were evaluated for their ability to hide a ship as seen against the distant sky on the horizon. Artist Abbott Handerson Thayer investigated countershading color schemes to "paint out" natural shadows. The United States Navy switched from gray to white in the 1900s, and in 1907 its Great White Fleet set out to circumnavigate the globe with all-white hulls. The white paint proved to be unsuccessful, and after the return of the Great White Fleet, its ships were painted gray. British ships began being painted gray in 1903; lighter shades were preferred to minimize solar heating in warmer climates.

== First World War ==
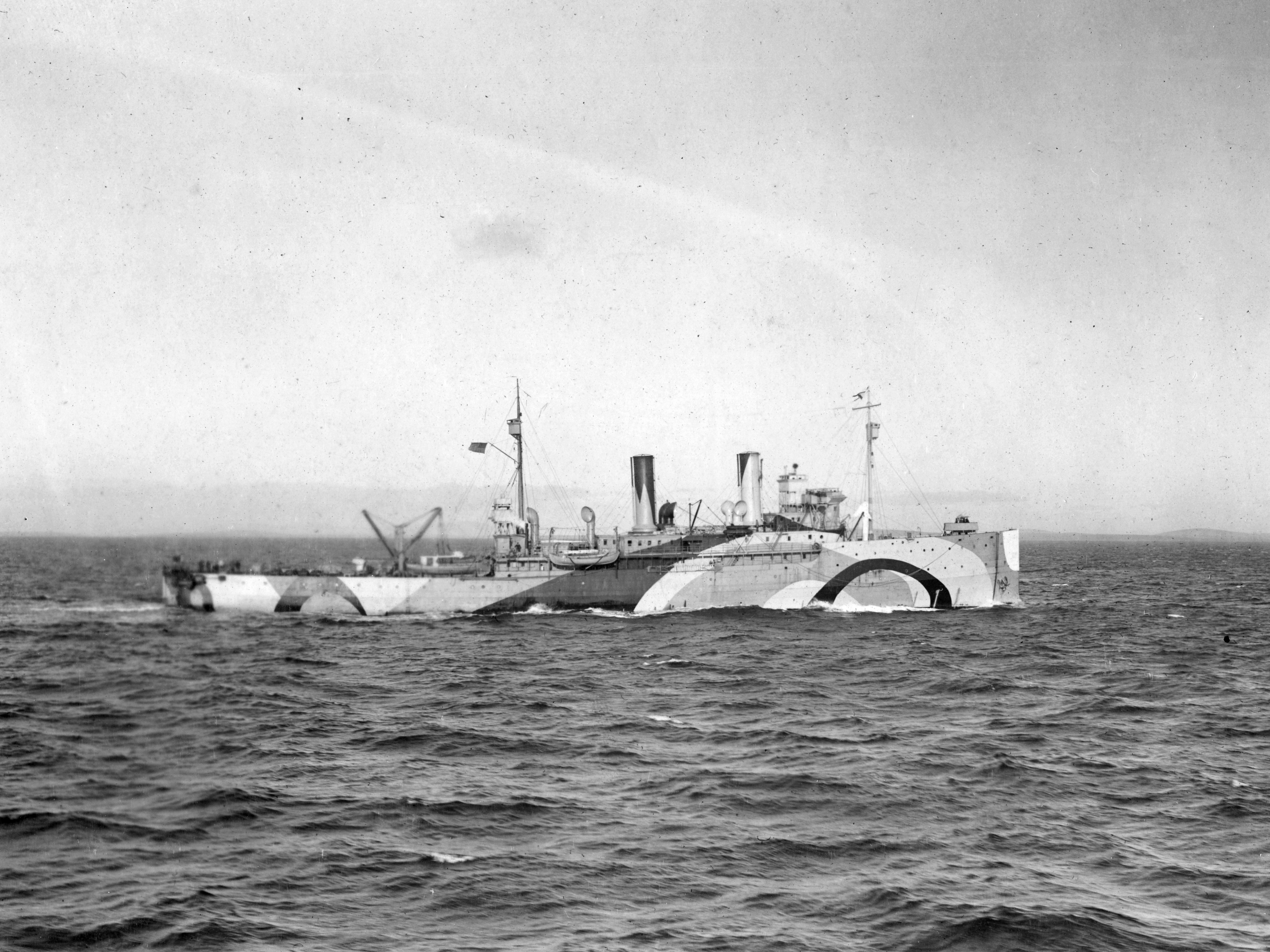
USS Shawmut was the former Eastern steamship Massachusetts converted to lay the 1918 North Sea Mine Barrage.

In the First World War, the increasing range of naval guns, and the great fear of high-speed, long-range torpedoes used against warships and merchant ships caused a significant increase in the use of ship camouflage.

=== Royal Navy ===
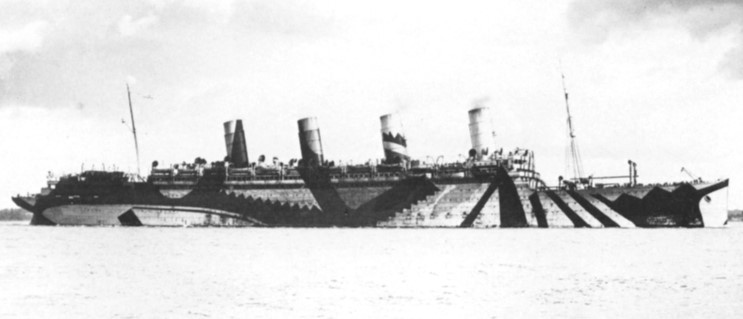
HMT Aquitania wearing dazzle camouflage

Patterned ship camouflage was pioneered in Britain. Early in the First World War, the zoologist John Graham Kerr advised Winston Churchill to use disruptive camouflage to break up ships' outlines, and countershading to make them appear less solid, following the American artist Abbott Handerson Thayer's beliefs. Kerr was not an effective political campaigner, and his ideas were abandoned on Churchill's departure from the Admiralty, while his postwar legal action to claim credit for ship camouflage failed. His successor, the marine artist Norman Wilkinson, successfully promoted the idea that Kerr's camouflage sought invisibility rather than image disruption. Under Wilkinson, the Admiralty researched and issued a large number of "razzle-dazzle" designs, which became known simply as "dazzle", to counter the threat from submarines. Models were made and painted, often by women artists, and tested in a laboratory by viewing through a periscope. After trials, in October 1917 the Admiralty ordered all its merchant ships to be painted in dazzle patterns. The purpose of dazzle camouflage was not however motion dazzle but course deception, as Wilkinson later explained:

The primary object of this scheme was not so much to cause the enemy to miss his shot when actually in firing position, but to mislead him, when the ship was first sighted, as to the correct position to take up. ... making it a matter of difficulty for a submarine to decide on the exact course of the vessel to be attacked.

— Norman Wilkinson

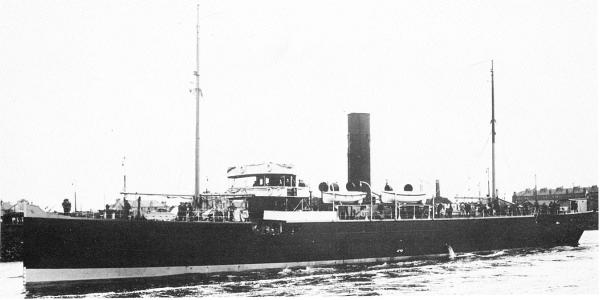
The Q-ship HMS Tamarisk

Over 4000 British merchant ships and some 400 naval vessels were painted in dazzle camouflage during 1917–1918.

Deceptive measures other than dazzle included the fitting of anti-rangefinder baffles to the masts and yards of battleships such as HMS Emperor of India in 1917. Deceptive mimicry was also practised, with heavily armed Q-ships disguised as merchant ships.

=== German Imperial Navy ===
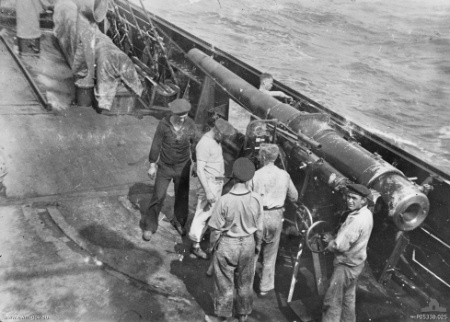
A gun aboard the German Imperial Navy's commerce raider SMS Wolf, retracted behind the side of the ship; when not in use the gun was covered with canvas.

The German navy put little emphasis on camouflage. After the Battle of Jutland, German naval effort in any case went into submarine warfare. However, Germany made use of disguise, such as by painting ships in the colour schemes of British or neutral shipping. For example, the Kronprinzessin Cecilie was painted to resemble the British liner Olympic, and managed to reach America, evading the British blockade in 1914. In 1915 and 1916, the Germans further made use of commerce raiders, converted freighters with hidden weapons and long range, able to slip through the British blockade and then attack shipping as far away as the south Atlantic. German First World War merchant ships were rarely camouflaged, nor did they use Q-ships, as the Allied navies did not attack merchant shipping.

=== Other navies ===
The Allied navies of France and Italy essentially followed Admiralty camouflage practice. In 1913, American camouflage experiments included a submarine painted in a three-color pattern of broad vertical stripes designed by William Mackay, using white stripes to separate green and blue stripes. Wilkinson visited the United States to advise the U.S. Navy on ship camouflage. Dazzle schemes were used on merchant ships, naval transports, and smaller warships. Battleships were camouflaged in a variety of patterns. (Note: Mackay Low Visibility System was violet with red or green patches or speckles. Mackay Disruptive/Low Visibility System had solid blue on the lower hull, with green, orange and white in bold, undulating shapes above. Toch Disruptive/Low Visibility System (used for troop transports) had parallel, curving diagonal stripes of gray, green, purple, red, brown and white. Warner Disruptive Dazzle System (used for troop transports) had large, curving shapes in red, blue and green, mixed in with white or gray shapes.)

== Second World War ==
Some two-color paint schemes attempted to harmonize with both sea and sky near the horizon. The US Navy painted some ships dark gray with white structures above bridge level. Both the US Navy and the Royal Navy painted ships dark gray on the hull and light gray on the superstructure and turrets. USN measure 12 was a graded system with sea blue low on the hull below the first continuous deck, with ocean gray above that. The top of the masts were painted haze gray. This measure was modified with ocean gray above navy blue low on the hull below the first continuous deck (painted parallel to the waterline rather than the main deck). This bold contrast on a horizontal line near the horizon reduced visibility to surface observers and created the illusion of greater range. This camouflage was considered most effective for gunnery engagements with surface units or shore batteries in areas where aerial observation was unlikely. It was used in the Atlantic and European coastal waters from the end of 1942 through the end of World War II. It was worn by shore bombardment ships in the Pacific from late 1944 after the destruction of Japanese naval aviation capability at the Battle of the Philippine Sea. Similar Admiralty standard schemes were applied beginning in 1944 when it was assumed enemy forces would have radar. Ships were painted light gray overall, except for a sea blue patch low on the hull, either between the main gun turrets or the entire length of the hull.

=== United States Navy ===
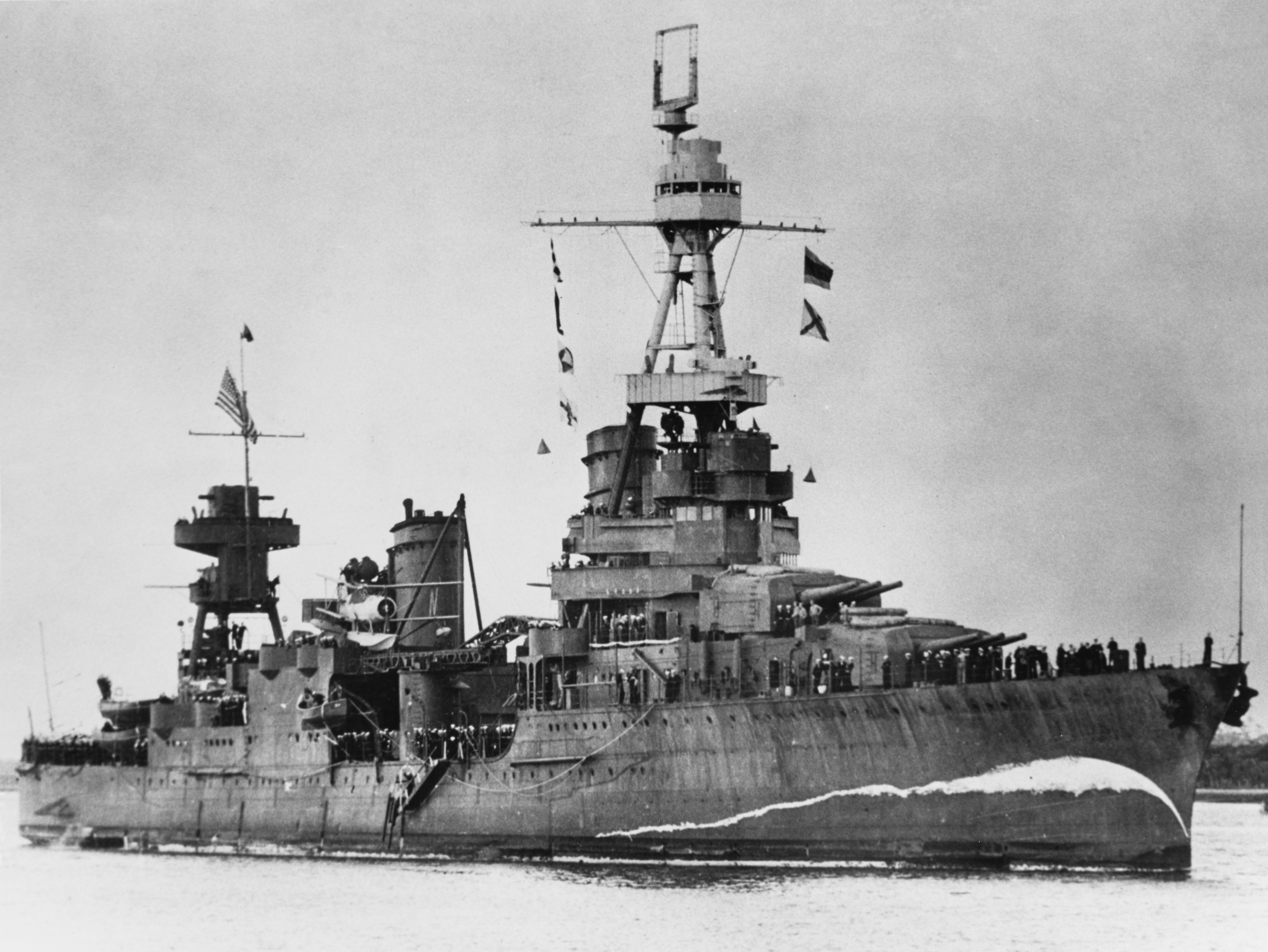
USS Northampton wearing the false bow wave of measure 5

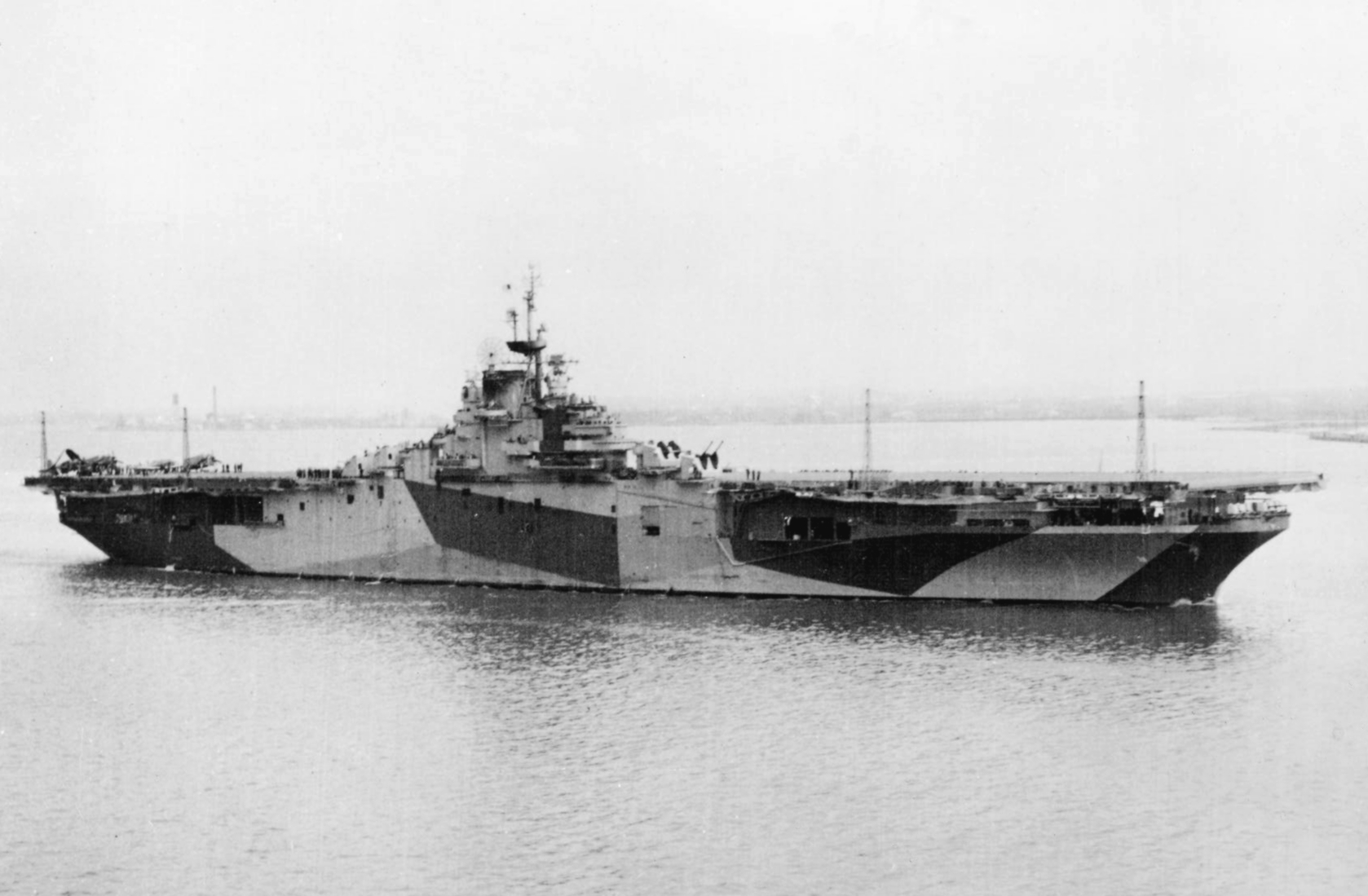
USS Antietam in measure 32, design 17A-2

In 1935, the United States Navy Naval Research Laboratory began studies and tests on low-visibility camouflage for ships. Some measures were deceptive, like a false-painted bow wave to give the impression of high speed at all times. Measures making cruisers resemble destroyers were discontinued after causing station-keeping confusion among ships operating in formation.

Color schemes included light gray, haze gray, ocean gray, and black. Haze gray was found to provide reasonable protection in the widest range of conditions, and became a standard US Navy paint scheme after World War II. Ocean gray also became a standard paint scheme after the war. Although black is still used for submarines, it was discontinued on destroyers after it had been determined that black ships remained more noticeable than gray ships on even the darkest nights.

The US Navy painted some ships sea blue overall for concealment from aircraft. During the Battle of the Coral Sea and the Battle of Midway, ships painted completely blue came under attack less often than ships wearing two-color schemes. On the advice of United States aviators the blue color was darkened and used extensively in the western and southern Pacific from mid-1942 through 1945 to minimize detection and identification by enemy aircraft. Dark blue also proved effective under artificial illumination during night actions. Upper surfaces of aircraft operating from carrier decks were painted a similar shade of blue. Sailors were ordered to wear dungarees rather than white uniforms when topside.

The Thayer system was white with large polygonal patches of light sea blue (called Thayer Blue). This measure was most useful in Arctic latitudes with extended twilight and frequent fog and cloud cover. Purity of color was important for full realization of the Purkinje effect where some colors appear lighter and some appear darker at low levels of illumination. Darkening the pattern increased course deception, (Note: Course deception was the purpose of dazzle camouflage.) but increased visibility at night and in haze.

Measure 32 was a medium pattern of obtrusive polygons in navy blue or black, against background polygons of lighter grays and greens. This measure emphasized mistaken identity and course deception to complicate submarine attack. Patterns were carried across the bow, and light gray was used aft to blend with the wake. This measure was based on the World War I dazzle system modified by observations in the western Pacific; and was applied to most surface ships in the Pacific during 1944 and 1945. Different patterns were devised for classes with large numbers of ships so the pattern would not identify the class of ship.

=== Royal Navy ===
Between the world wars, Royal Navy ships were painted dark gray in the Home Fleet, light gray in the Mediterranean and Caribbean Seas, and white in the Indian Ocean and western Pacific. Many Home Fleet ships were painted medium gray during 1939 and 1940 to decrease visibility from the peacetime dark gray.

In the first year of the war British captains largely painted their ships as they saw fit. HMS Grenville is believed to have been the first ship to adopt a disruptive camouflage paint scheme in December 1939, and several G-class destroyers of her flotilla used a similar scheme of contrasting stone-colored polygons. When concern arose about German aerial reconnaissance of Scapa Flow, some Home Fleet ships were painted with disruptive Flotta schemes of dark brown, light gray, and light green polygons from April to August 1940 for concealment and identity confusion in port. Most Home Fleet ships had been repainted medium gray by December 1940.

The Royal Navy painted Mediterranean submarines dark blue in 1940 to reduce submerged visibility to aircraft.

Captain Louis Mountbatten's 5th Flotilla of K-class destroyers were painted Mountbatten pink in 1940. Mountbatten observed a Union-Castle Liner disappear from convoy during an autumn sunset because of the company's unusual lavender-mauve-gray hull color. Mountbatten reasoned the color would be effective camouflage during dawn and dusk periods, and devised a similar shade by mixing medium gray with a small amount of venetian red. Its effectiveness was much disputed; but it was applied to other destroyers, a few cruisers, and numerous small warships which maintained the scheme through 1944 for use in coastal waters.

No Admiralty camouflage section was established until October 1940. Admiralty camouflage schemes promulgated in 1941 were not universally adopted because of difficulties with operating schedules and shortages of some paint pigments. Nearly all destroyers and larger ships wore an Admiralty disruptive camouflage scheme by late 1942; but Commonwealth captains executed official camouflage schemes with greater variation than was customary with American measures.

Initial Admiralty disruptive camouflage schemes employed polygons of varying shades of gray, blue and green so at least two of the colors would blend with background sea or sky under different light conditions. Schemes devised for capital ships emphasized identity confusion rather than concealment. HMS Queen Elizabeth became the first ship to receive an official camouflage scheme in January 1941. As more ships received similar schemes through 1941, it became evident the polygons were too small to be differentiated at effective camouflage ranges. Simplified Admiralty light and dark disruptive schemes were promulgated in 1942 to use larger and simpler polygons with no more than four colors. Light disruptive schemes were intended for use in the higher latitudes where skies were often overcast. Dark disruptive schemes used darker colors providing more effective disruption where bright sunlight could be expected.

The Admiralty Western Approaches scheme evolved from a camouflage scheme applied to HMS Broke in June 1940 at the suggestion of the naturalist Peter Scott, who was serving aboard that ship. Broke was painted white with large polygonal patches of light gray, light sea blue and light sea green. Broke achieved some notoriety in a collision where the captain of the other ship claimed to have been unable to see Broke. Escort captains observing Broke experimented with similar schemes including polygons of dark gray or dark blue for increased disruptive contrast, while others tried painting their ships entirely white to emphasize concealment. The Admiralty omitted light gray from Peter Scott's scheme. White with large polygonal patches of light sea blue and light sea green was adopted in mid-1941 for use exclusively on destroyers and smaller ships engaged in anti-submarine operations. This was an effective scheme under typical North Atlantic weather conditions of fog and overcast. Captain-class frigate were delivered painted white with a pattern of sea blue and light gray in an American Western Approaches variant. These were colors used in American camouflage measures; but the pattern was unique to ships produced for the Royal Navy and was replaced by Admiralty schemes and colors during refit. The Home Fleet destroyer scheme was similar to the Western Approaches scheme but used darker shades of blue and gray on the rear third of the ship, to assist in station-keeping. British decks were usually dark gray.

The Admiralty's informal approach changed when a branch of the Naval Research Laboratory was established at Leamington Spa under Commander James Yunge-Bateman to test ship camouflage schemes experimentally. Painted models were floated in a large tank and examined against different backgrounds, using theater lamps to simulate varying lighting conditions.

An experimental coating able to change color was tested on Royal Navy submarines. On suggestion by Professor Leslie Cromby, lead oxide was applied to the hull, enabling it to become black on application of a solution of sulphite and sea water for night operation. For day sailing, a solution of hydrogen peroxide and sea water would be applied, producing sulphate and returning the hull to a white colour desirable for daytime conditions.

Preparing a background to test a camouflage scheme for a model warship at the naval research laboratory, Leamington Spa

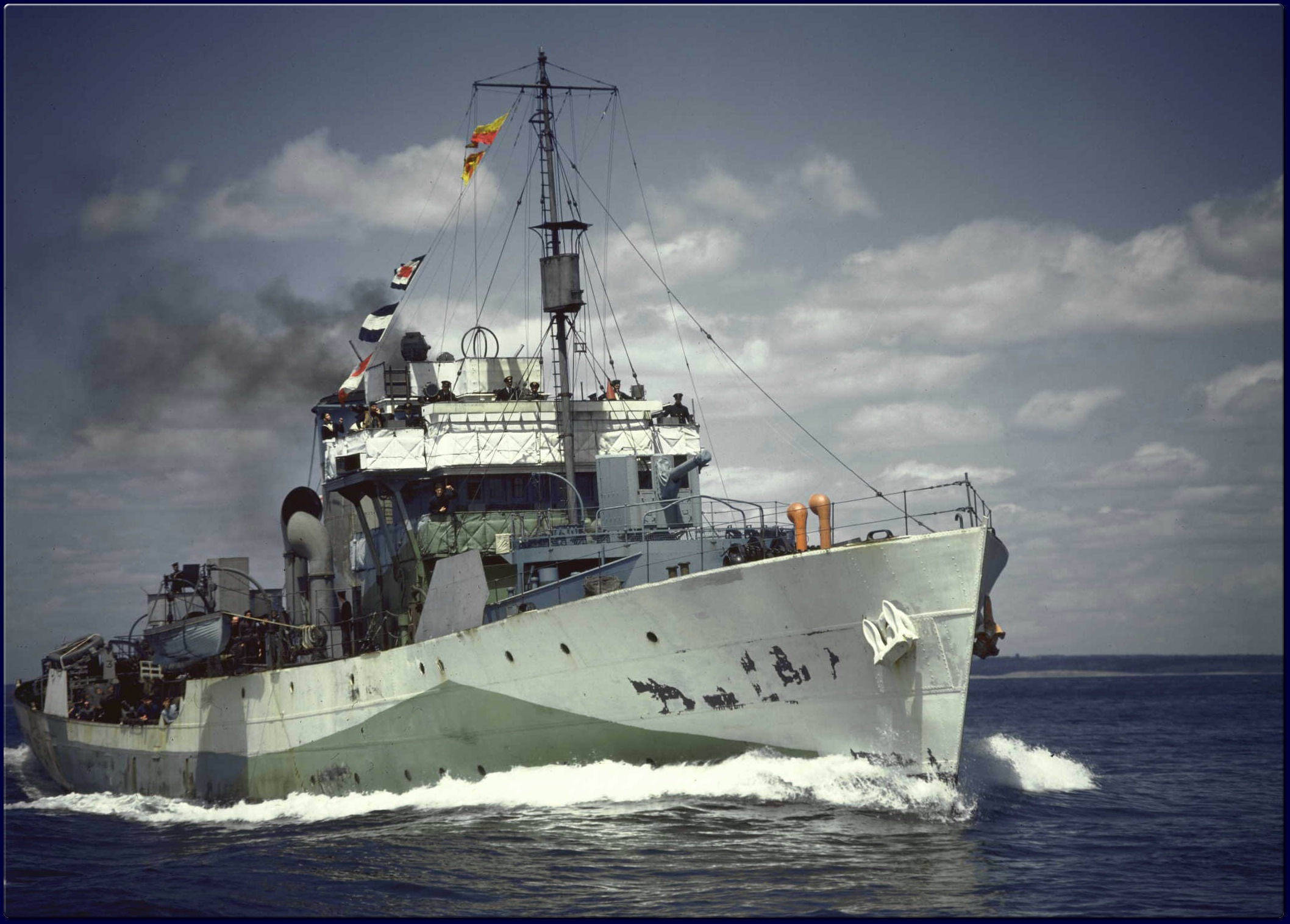
HMCS Regina in the Western Approaches scheme

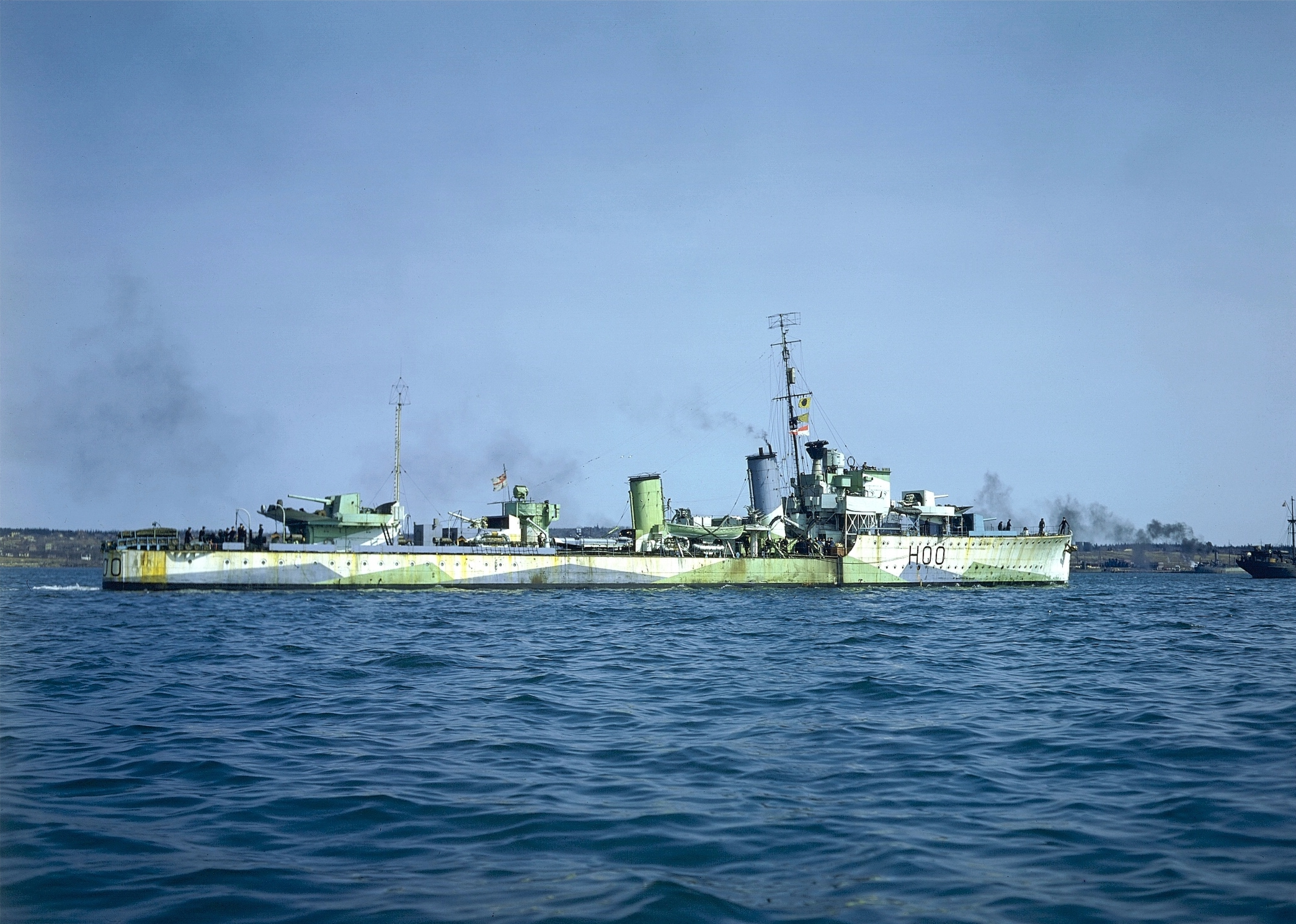
HMCS Restigouche in the Western Approaches scheme

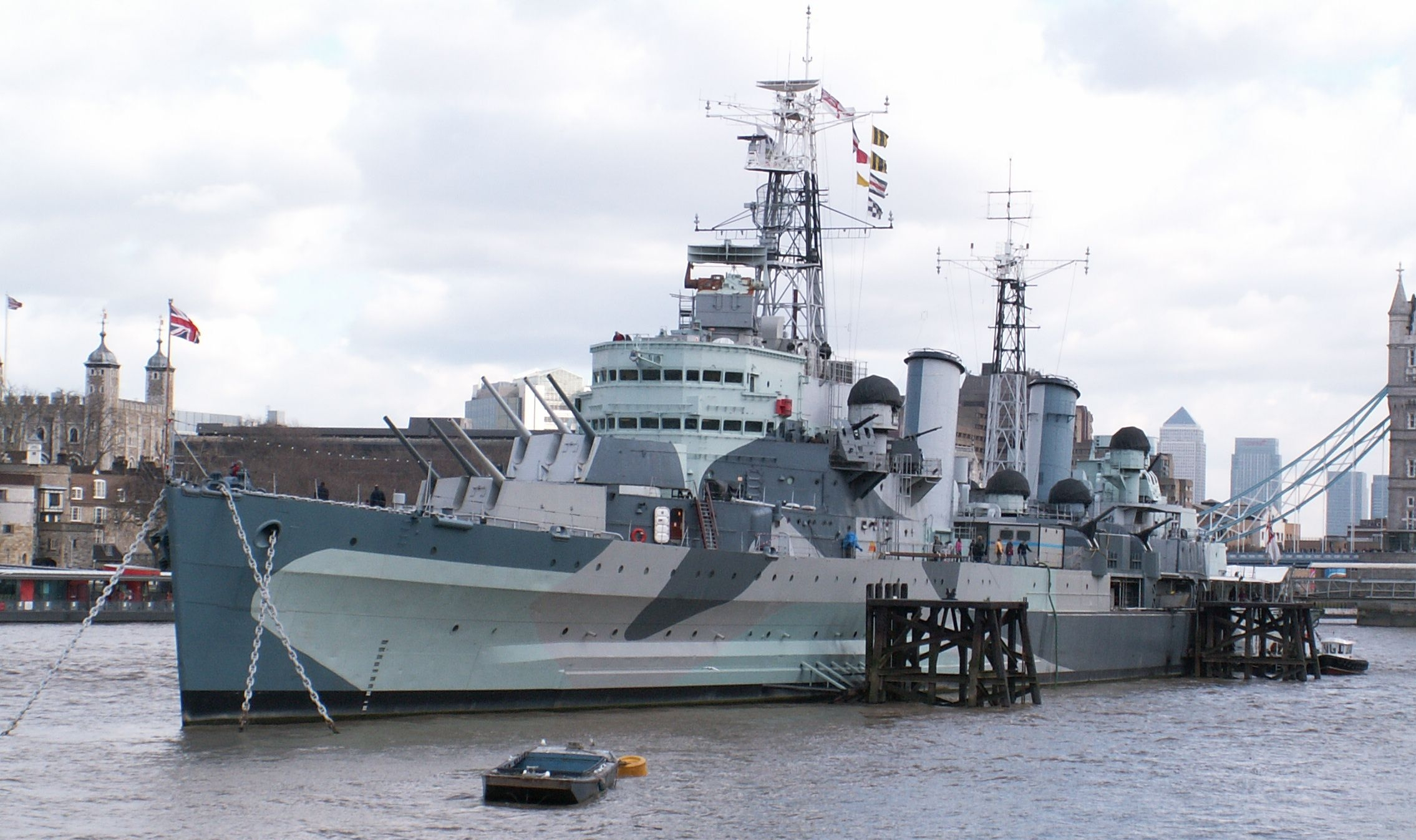
HMS Belfast repainted in Admiralty camouflage

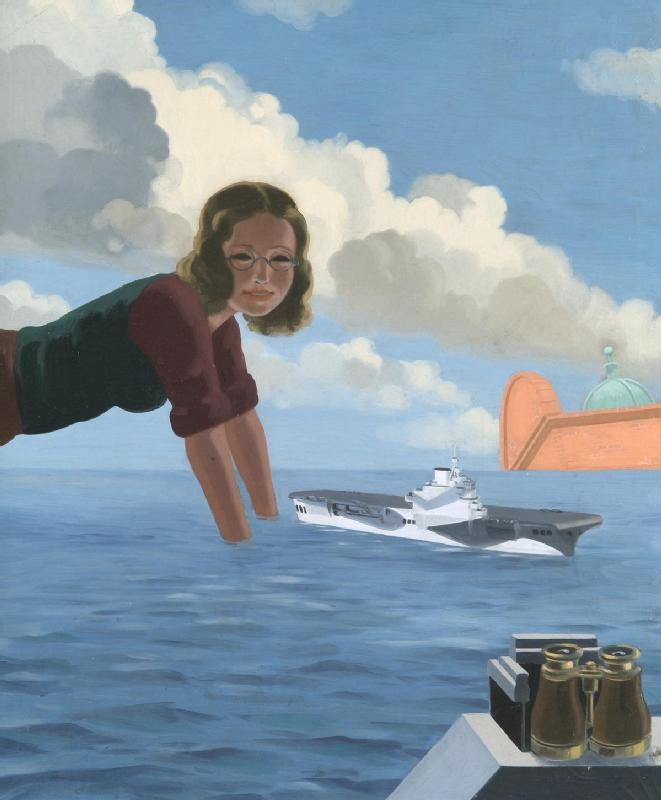
The "Outside Viewing-tank" on the roof of the naval research laboratory. Painting by James Yunge-Bateman, 1943

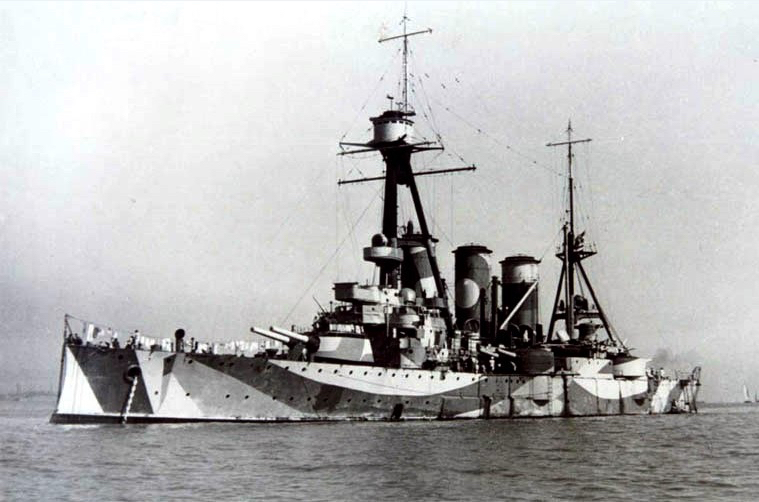
RHNS Georgios Averof, RN Bombay Station, 1942

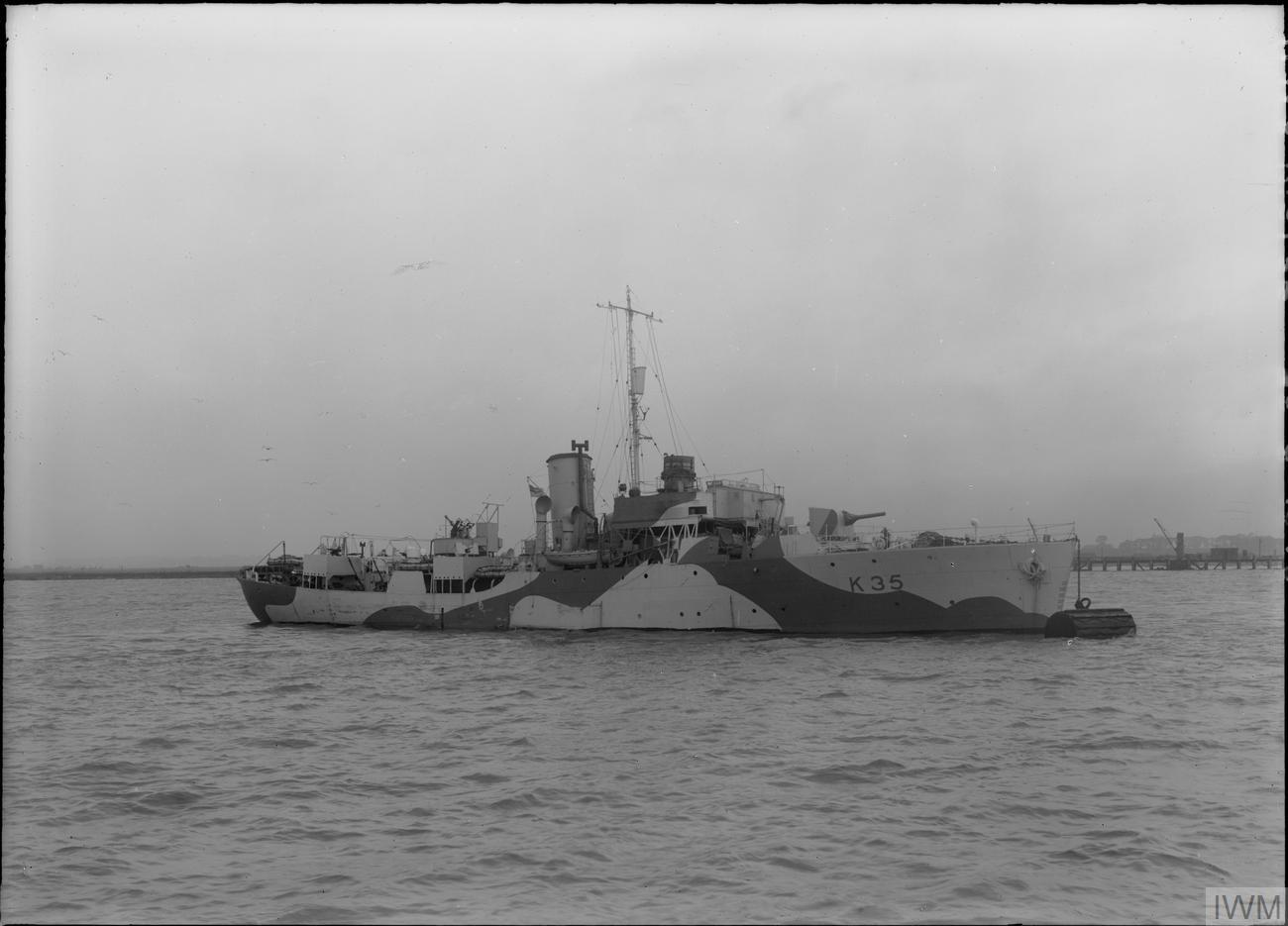
HMS Violet, a Flower-class corvette

=== German Kriegsmarine ===
German Kriegsmarine ships before the Second World War were either light gray overall or had dark gray hulls, and many retained this scheme during the war. The cruiser Deutschland, for instance, had a gray hull and light gray superstructure in 1934. Others had dazzle camouflage, usually in combinations of pale gray, dark gray, and sea blue. For example, the hull of the battleship Scharnhorst had a dazzle pattern of stripes on a gray background in 1940, but some of these were later painted out, and the bows forward of the main guns painted black. Scharnhorst was not camouflaged against air observation, her decks fore and aft bearing large black on white swastikas on a red field; her main gun turrets had red (in the Baltic) or yellow tops for air recognition. The battleship Bismarck set out to Norway in dazzle camouflage; this was painted out with gray for her final trip to the Atlantic. The cruiser Admiral Scheer wore a low-contrast pattern of irregular dark gray marks on light gray for her superstructure, with a dark gray hull, black waterline and, away from air support while out raiding in 1941, dark gray turret tops.

Larger ships often had false bows and sterns painted in a different shade from the rest of the hull to create the impression of the ship being at greater range from the observer. German decks were a very dark gray. Smaller ships operating in the North Sea or Baltic Sea were painted white or a very pale gray to blend in with daytime mist and nighttime phosphorescent organisms. As in the First World War, the Germans again employed disguised commerce raiders, Hilfskreuzer such as Atlantis, Thor and Kormoran. These ships were able to modify their appearance to throw off the searching Allied cruisers.

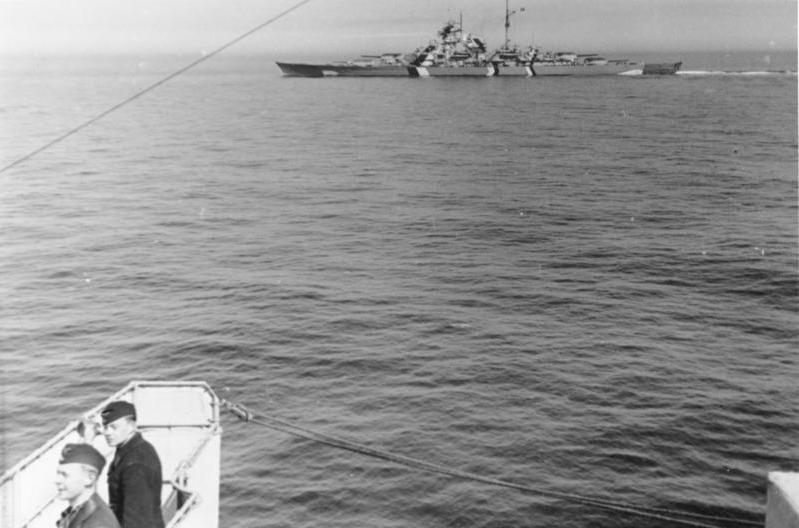
German battleship Bismarck wearing dazzle camouflage in the Baltic Sea, 1941

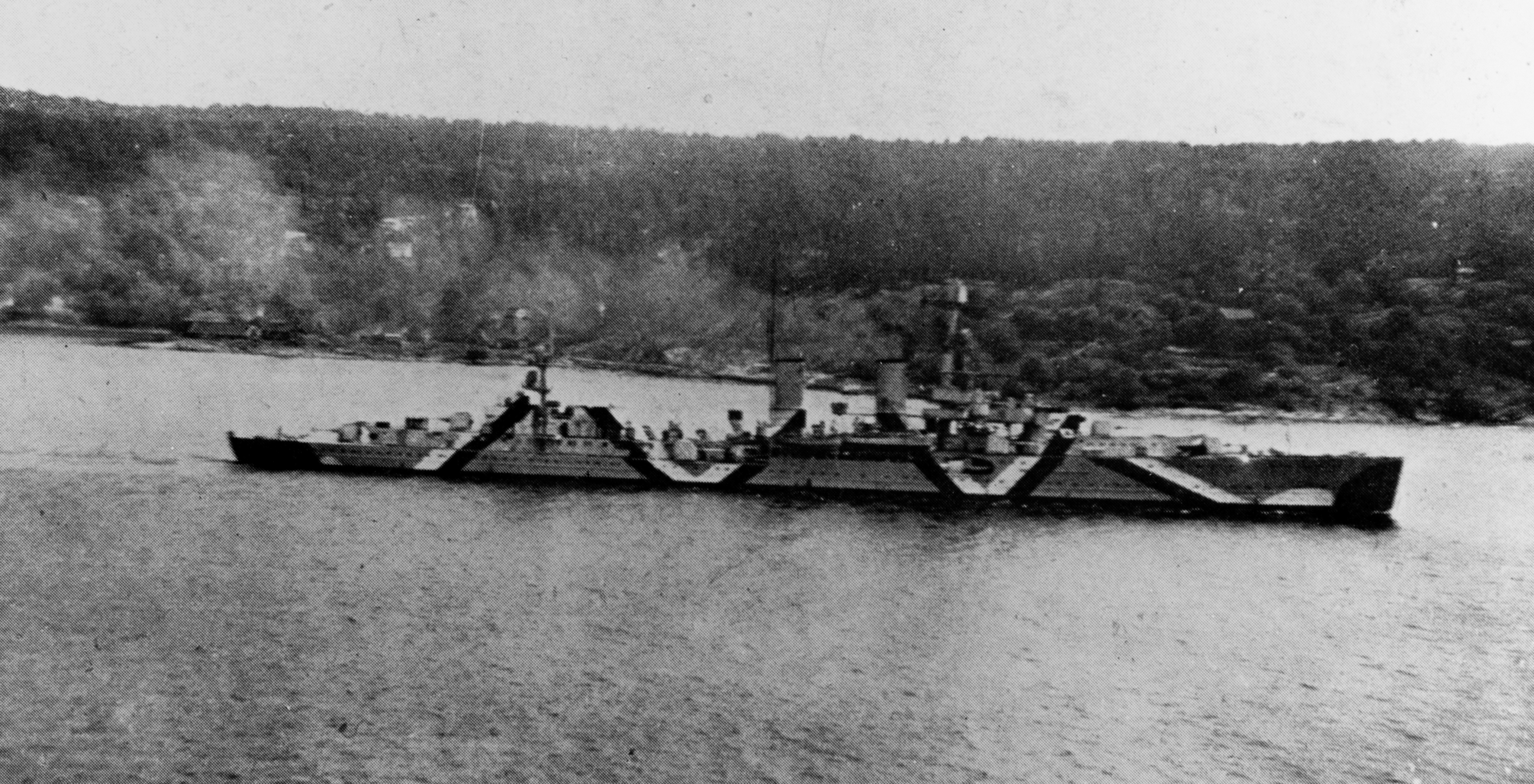
German cruiser Emden in September 1941.

German battleship Tirpitz wearing disruptive camouflage in Bogen Bay near Narvik, northern Norway, 1943–44

=== Royal Canadian Navy ===
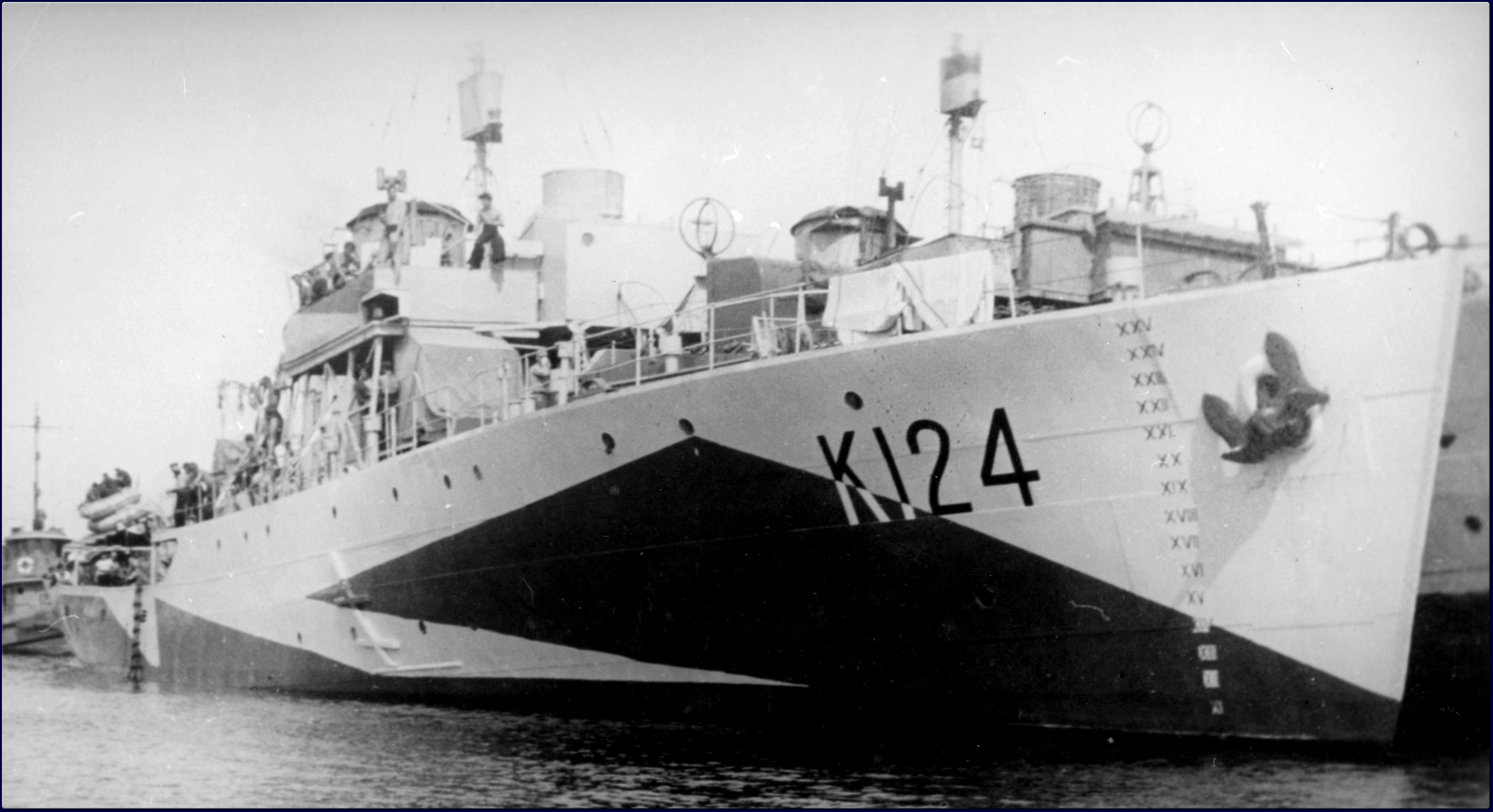
HMCS Cobalt began secret sea trials of counter-illumination camouflage in January 1941

In the diffused lighting camouflage project, the Royal Canadian Navy experimented with variable counter-illumination camouflage to match horizon light levels and minimize ships' silhouettes during prolonged arctic twilight. During the experiments, one side of the test ship was faintly illuminated by projectors mounted outboard. Results were improved with the use of blue-green filters, and then with a photocell to measure the brightness of the night sky. The ship's visibility was reduced, but the technology was inconvenient and never adopted in practice.

=== Other navies ===
Italian ships of Mussolini's navy retained its pre-war scheme of light gray overall for its smaller ships, but the larger units mostly had dazzle camouflage of dark gray, light sea blue, light sea green and light gray. Italian foredecks had a high-visibility pattern of red and white diagonal stripes so that their own aircraft would not attack them.

Japanese ships were generally not camouflaged. In special tactical situations, camouflage could be improvised, as when the battleships Yamato and Musashi had their decks blackened with a mixture of soot to help them hide while passing through the San Bernardino Strait at night in the October 1944 Battle of Leyte Gulf. Japanese ships largely retained their pre-war dark gray paint scheme, although some major units like aircraft carriers changed to a dark sea green. Some aircraft carriers had their flight decks painted in a dazzle camouflage, but this seems to have been ineffective. By 1945, with the remnants of the Japanese Navy seeking to hide from American air power, its battleships were painted in a variety of camouflage measures. Haruna, for example, wore olive green overall, its turrets painted light green with gray stripes, whereas Ise's olive dress was broken up with patches of gray, red-brown, yellow, and dark green.

Soviet ships were dark gray overall, sometimes with medium gray upperworks.

The French Navy used light gray before the war and under the Vichy regime. Free French ships that operated with the British adopted one of the British schemes. Those that were refitted in American shipyards were usually repainted in the American Measure 22.

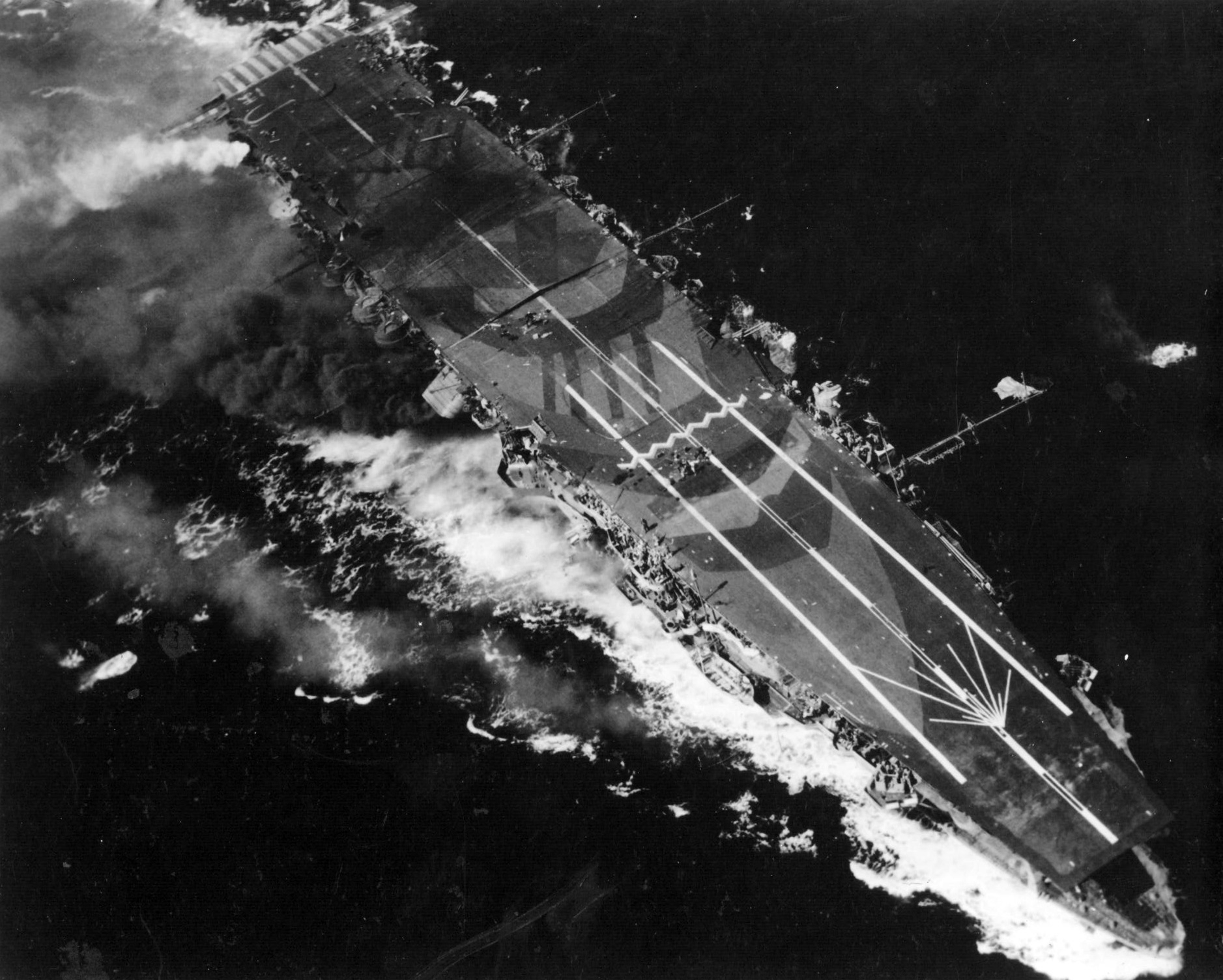
Japanese aircraft carrier Zuiho with its deck painted to resemble a battleship

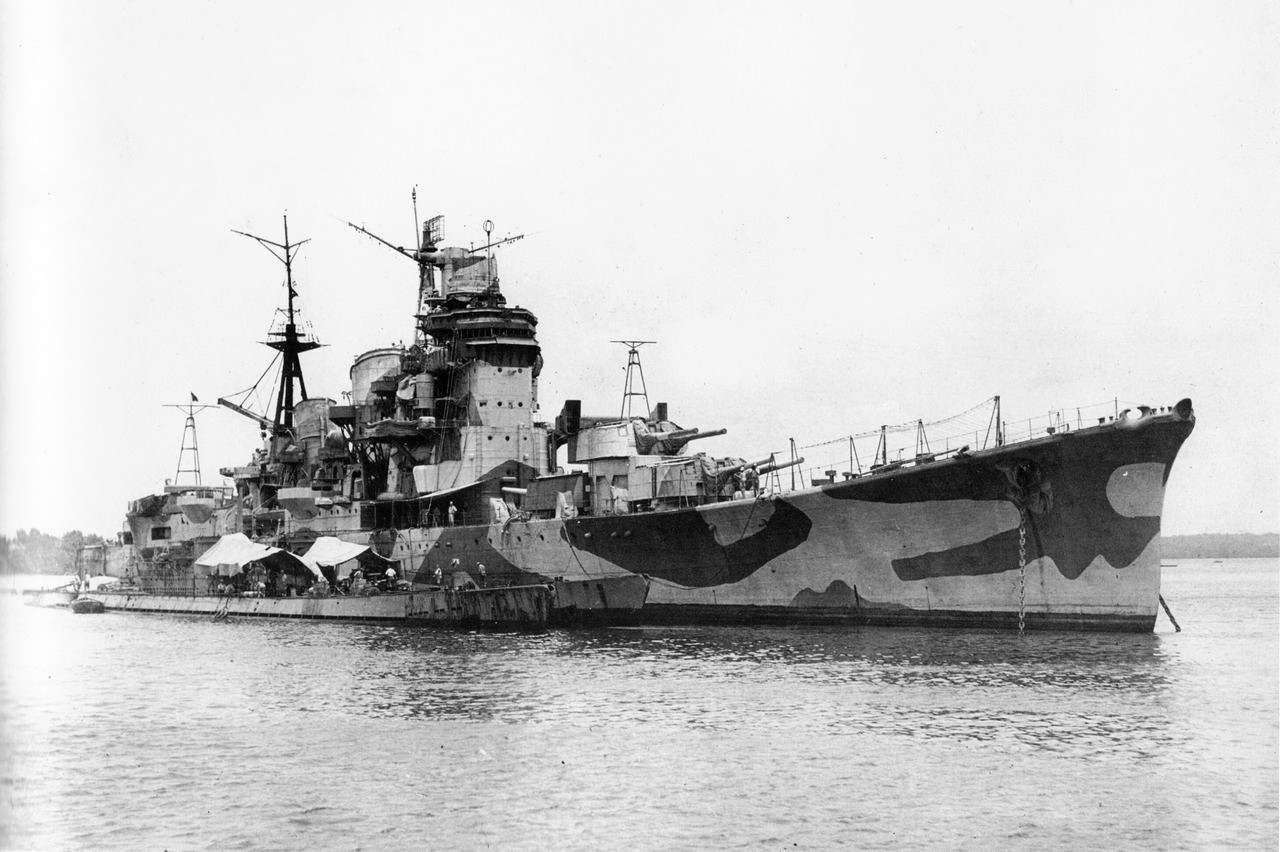
Japanese heavy cruiser Myōkō, Singapore 1945, disruptively camouflaged

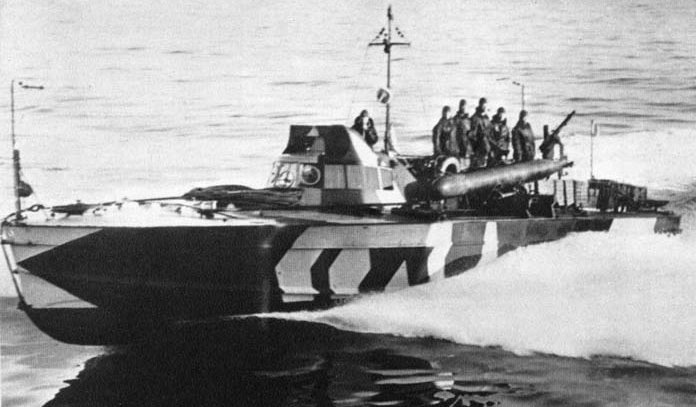
Italian World War II MAS boat in dazzle camouflage

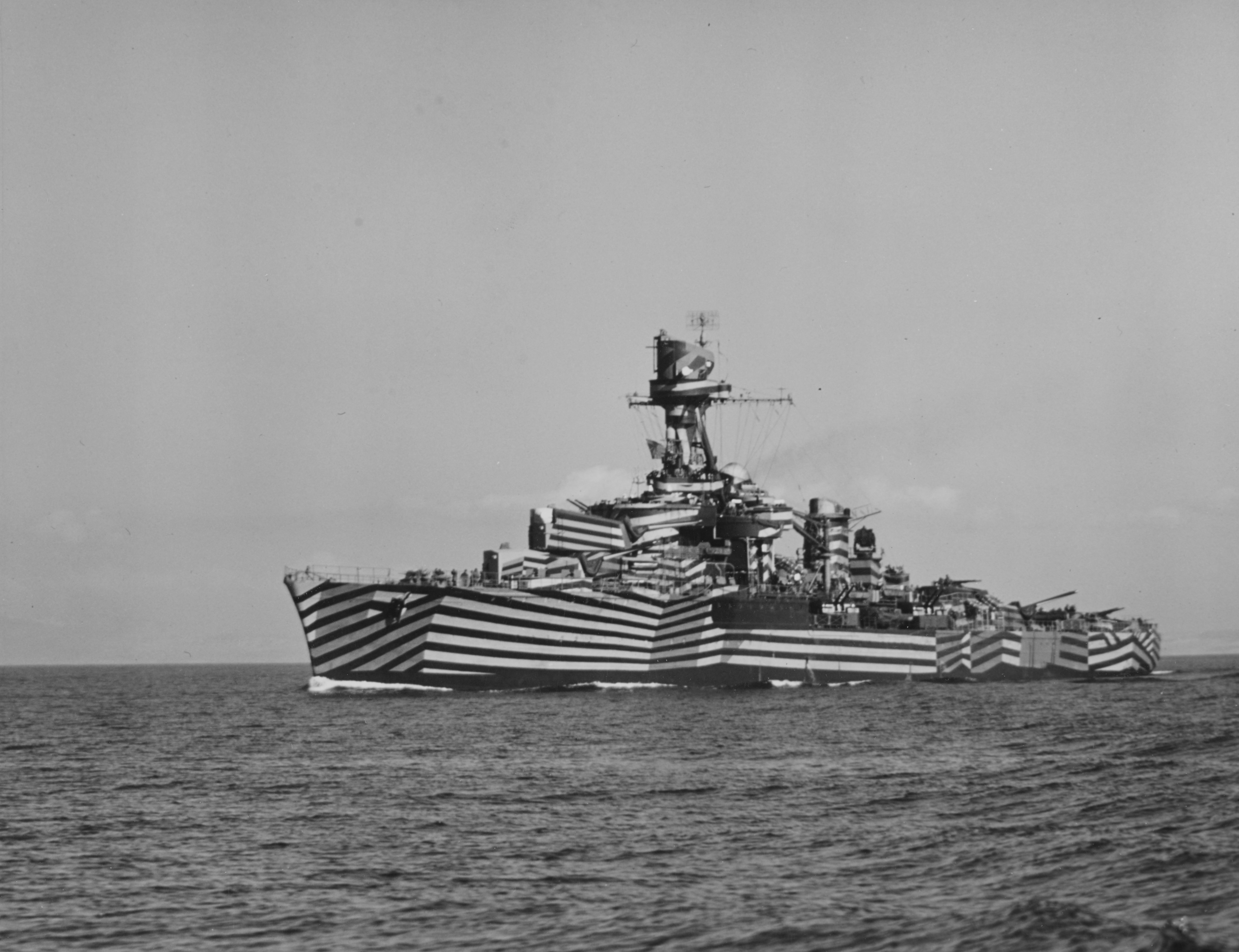
French cruiser Gloire in dazzle camouflage, Naples 1944

== Later uses ==
After the Second World War, the universal adoption of radar made traditional camouflage generally less effective, and led to development of stealth ships, a form of radar camouflage. However, camouflage may have helped United States warships avoid hits from Vietnamese shore batteries which used optical rangefinders. Some U.S. Navy PTF boats were camouflaged experimentally in 1975 with green overall, broken up by patterns of gray and black. USS Freedom, a littoral combat ship, is however said to be the first U.S. Navy ship to have camouflage reminiscent of that used in the World Wars.

In 2023, Black Sea Fleet of the Russian Navy applied camouflage to their Admiral Grigorovich Class frigate Admiral Essen. By making the ship appear smaller than it actually was, they were hoping to confuse remote operators of Ukrainian uncrewed surface vessels (USV) into thinking the ship was less valuable than it was. USV drones that rely on video feed from cameras and do not have advanced radars.

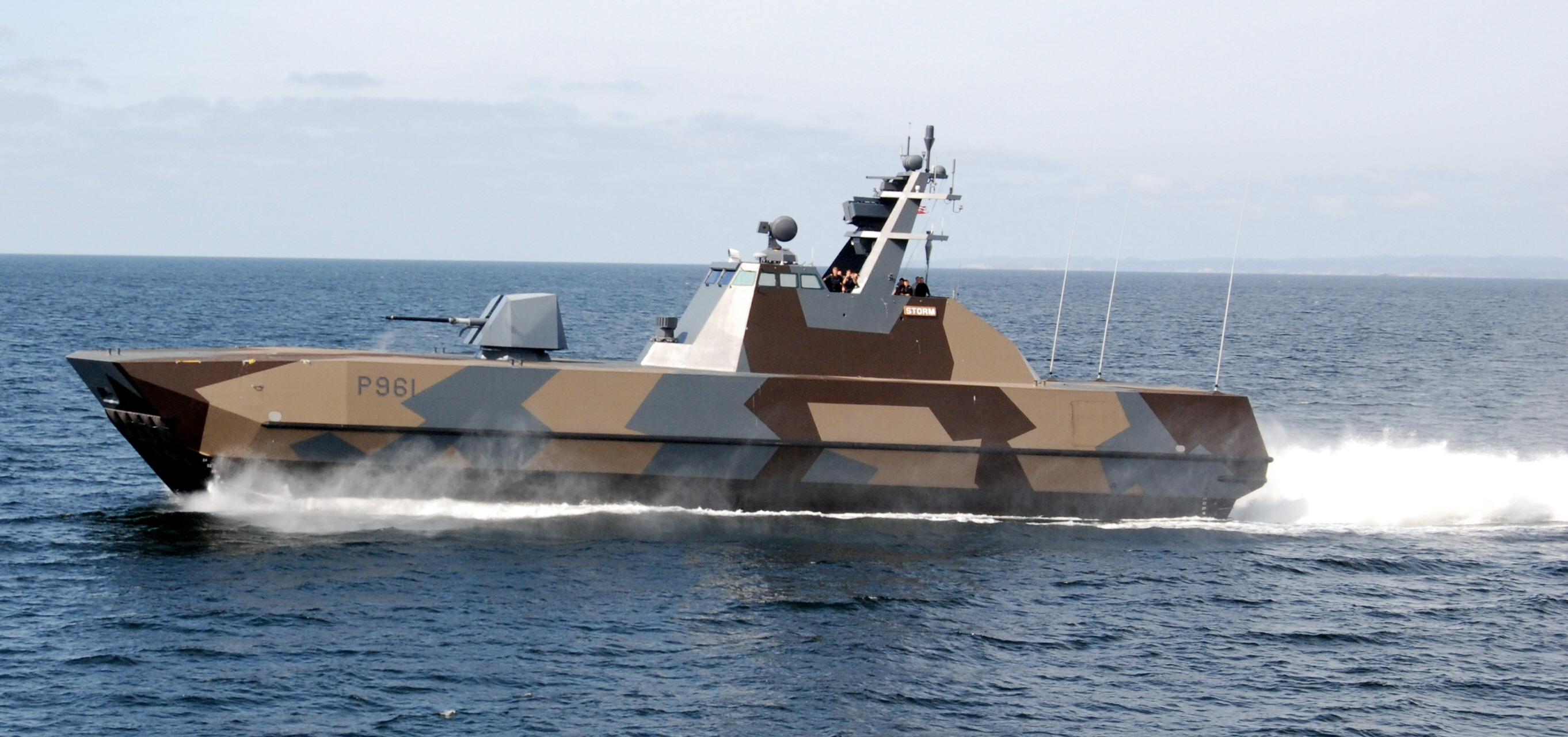
A Skjold-class corvette of the Royal Norwegian Navy in a disruptive pattern

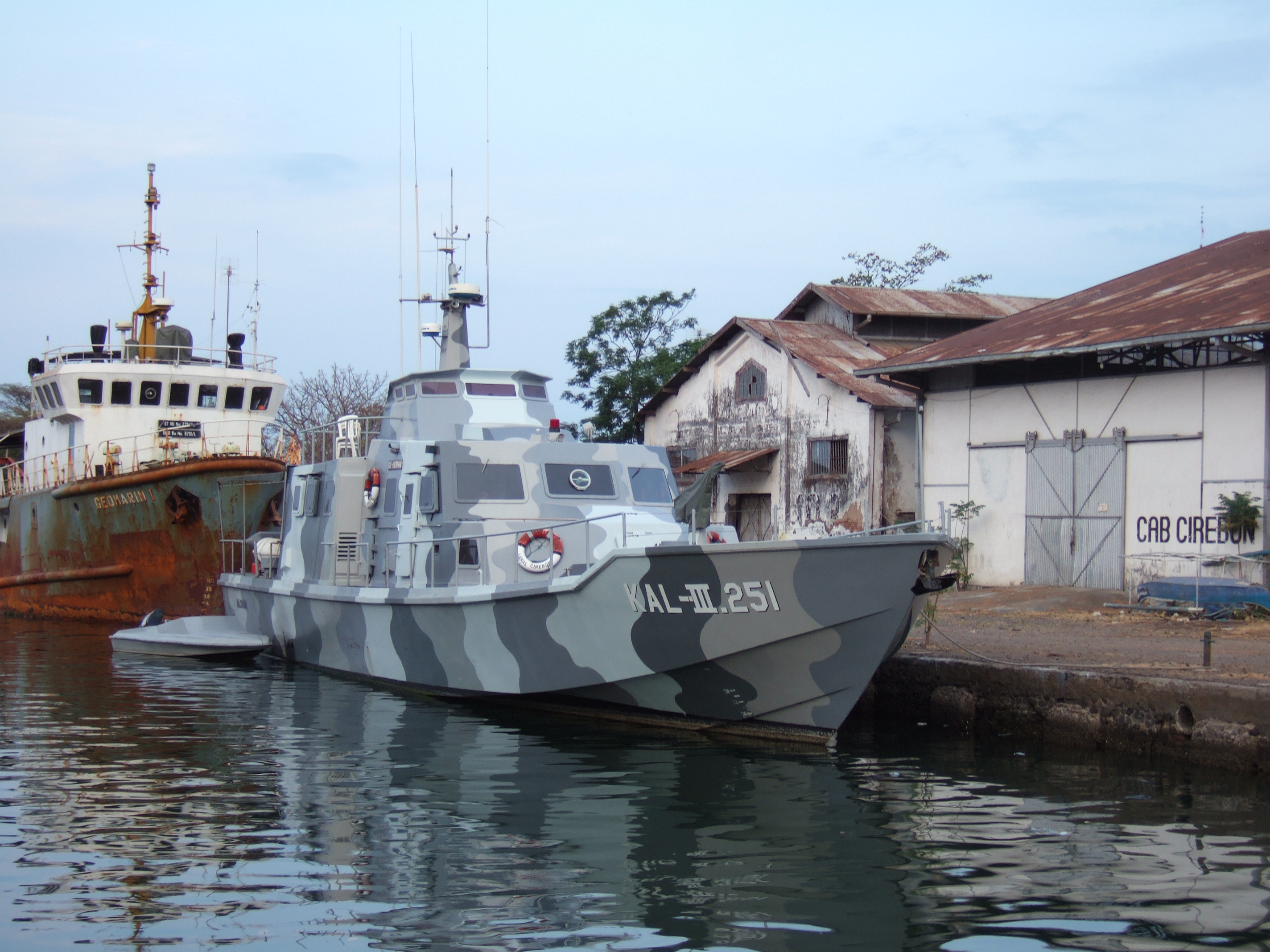
Patrol boat in Indonesia, 2006

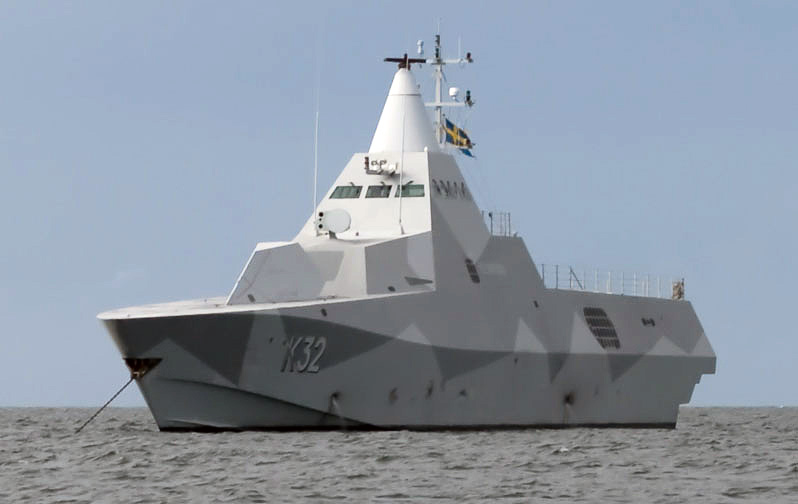
HSwMS Helsingborg, one of the Swedish Navy's Visby-class corvettes employs both visual camouflage and anti-radar stealth.

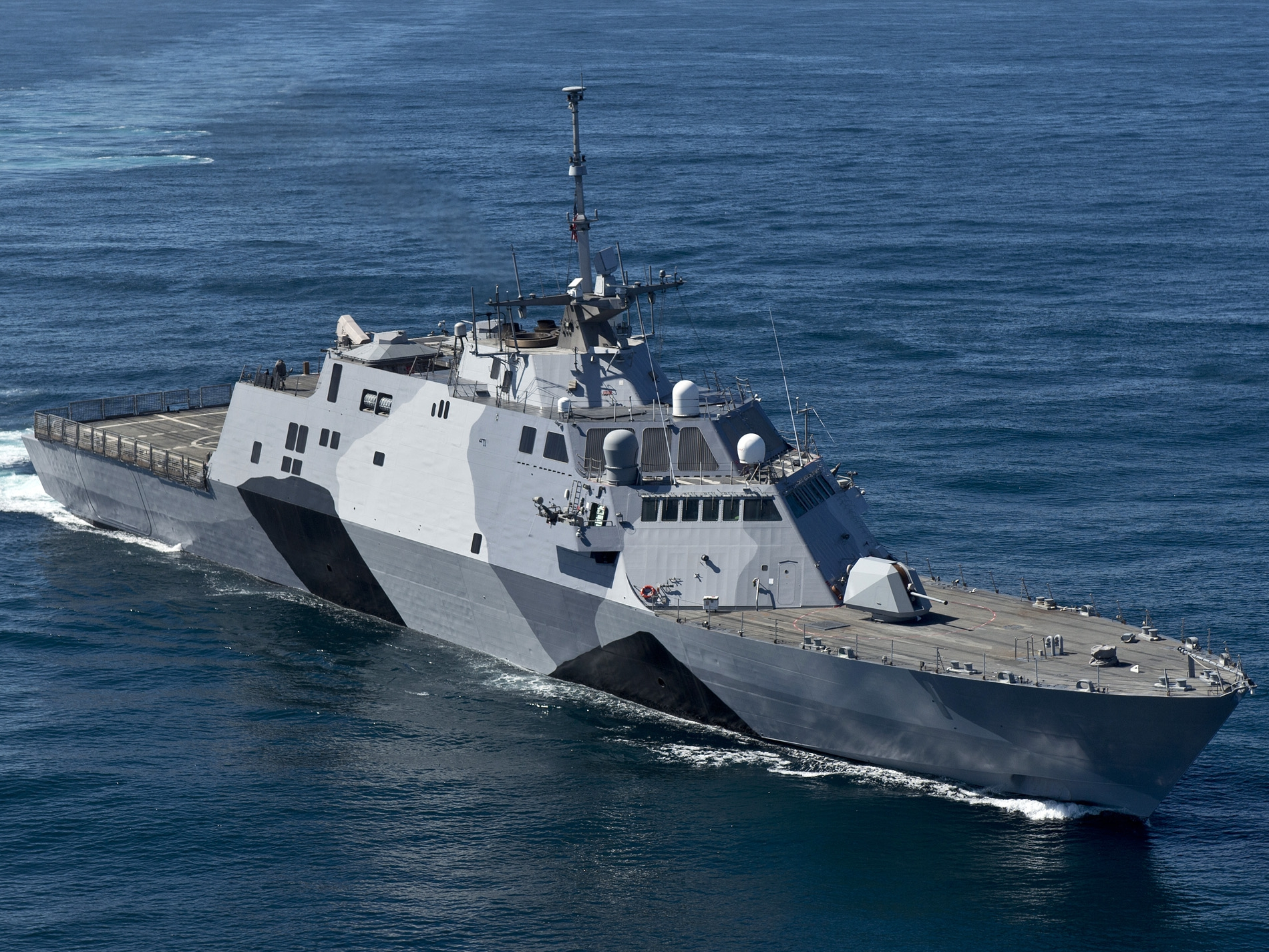
Littoral combat ship USS Freedom, 2013

== Sources ==
- Asmussen, John; Leon, Eric (2012). German Naval Camouflage Volume One 1939–1941. Seaforth Publishing. ISBN 978-1-84832-142-7.
- Bement, Alon, United States Shipping Board (1919). "Principles Underlying Ship Camouflage". International Marine Engineering. 24. Simmons-Boardman: 90–93.
- Beyer, Kenneth M. (1999). Q-Ships versus U-Boats: America's Secret Project. Naval Institute Press. ISBN 1-55750-044-4.
- Burt, R. A. (1986). British Battleships of World War One. Naval Institute Press. ISBN 0-87021-863-8.
- Casson, Lionel (1995). Ships and Seamanship in the Ancient World. JHU Press. ISBN 0801851300.
- Cowley, Robert; Parker (2001). The Reader's Companion to Military History. Houghton Mifflin Harcourt. p. 68. ISBN 0-618-12742-9.
- Duffy, James P. (2005). Hitler's Secret Pirate Fleet: The Deadliest Ships of World War II. U of Nebraska Press. ISBN 0-8032-6652-9.
- Eastman, Ralph M. (2004) [1928]. Some Famous Privateers of New England. Kessinger Publishing. ISBN 1-4179-0676-6.
- Ellis, Chris (1976). Famous Ships of World War 2. Blandford Press. ISBN 0-7137-0786-0.
- Faragher, John Mack (2012). Out of Many: a history of the American People. Prentice Hall.
- Forbes, Peter (2009). Dazzled and Deceived: Mimicry and Camouflage. Yale.
- Forczyk, Robert; Palmer, Ian (2012). German Commerce Raider vs British Cruiser: The Atlantic & The Pacific 1941. Osprey Publishing. ISBN 978-1-78200-844-6.
- Gardiner, Robert; Brown, David K. (2004). The Eclipse of the Big Gun: The Warship 1906–1945. Conway Maritime. ISBN 978-0-85177-953-9.
- Gröner, Erich (1990). German Warships: 1815–1945. Annapolis: Naval Institute Press. ISBN 0-87021-790-9.
- Haven, Kendall F. (2002). Voices of the American Civil War: Stories of men, women, and children who lived through the War Between the States. Libraries Unlimited. p. xiv. ISBN 1-56308-905-X.
- Kenyon, J. Douglas (2008). Forbidden science: from ancient technologies to free energy. Inner Traditions; Bear & Company. ISBN 978-1-59143-082-7.
- Leon, Eric; Asmussen, John (2015). German Naval Camouflage Volume Two 1942–1945. Naval Institute Press. ISBN 978-1-59114-199-0.
- Newark, Tim (2007). Camouflage. Thames and Hudson, with Imperial War Museum. ISBN 978-0-500-51347-7.
- Stille, Mark (2012). Imperial Japanese Navy Battleships 1941–45. Osprey Publishing. ISBN 978-1-78096-778-3.
- Stockbridge, Frank Parker (1920). Yankee ingenuity in the war. Harper. p. 317.
- Sumner, Graham (2003). Roman Military Clothing: AD 200–400. Vol. 2. Osprey Publishing. ISBN 1841765597.
- Sumrall, Robert F. (February 1973). "Ship Camouflage (WWII): Deceptive Art". United States Naval Institute Proceedings: 67–81.
- Terzibaschitsch, Stefan (1984). Kreuzer der U.S. Navy. Koehler, Herford. p. 32. ISBN 3-7822-0348-8.
- Tucker, Spencer C. (2013). The European Powers in the First World War: An Encyclopedia. Taylor & Francis. ISBN 978-1-135-50701-5.
- Williams, David (2001). Naval camouflage, 1914–1945 : a complete visual reference. Naval Institute Press. ISBN 1-55750-496-2.
- Wright, Malcolm (2014). British and Commonwealth Warship Camouflage of WWII: Destroyers, Frigates, Sloops, Escorts, Minesweepers, Submarines, Coastal Forces and Auxiliaries. Naval Institute Press. ISBN 978-1591141860.
