= List of equipment of the Myanmar Army =

Army flag of Myanmar

This is a list of equipment used by the Myanmar Army.

== Small arms ==
Name	Type	Note	Ammo	Origin	Image
Pistols
Browning Hi-Power	Semi-automatic pistol	Branded in the Tatmadaw as MA-5 MKI using stamping dies from the former John Inglis manufacturing facility in Toronto, Ontario, Canada	9×19mm Parabellum	Belgium; Canada; Socialist Republic of the Union of Burma / Union of Myanmar	
MA-5 MKII	Semi-automatic pistol	Clone of second-generation Glock models	9×19mm Parabellum	Austria; Socialist Republic of the Union of Burma / Union of Myanmar	
SIG Sauer P226	Semi-automatic pistol	Used by officers	9×19mm Parabellum	West Germany; Switzerland	
Submachine guns
BA-93	Submachine gun	Clone of the Uzi	9×19mm Parabellum	Israel Socialist Republic of the Union of Burma / Union of Myanmar	
BA-94 (MA-13 MK-I)	Submachine gun	Updated BA-93, redesigned receiver and polymer furniture	9×19mm Parabellum	Israel; Socialist Republic of the Union of Burma / Union of Myanmar	
MA-13 MKII	Submachine gun	Functional copy of the Mini Uzi with features reminiscent of the Steyr TMP	9×19mm Parabellum	Israel; Union of Myanmar; Myanmar	
Uzi	Submachine gun		9×19mm Parabellum	Israel	
Carbines
M1 carbine	Semi-automatic carbine	Used by people's militias	.30 carbine	United States	
Grenade launchers
M203	Grenade launcher		40×46mm	United States; Socialist Republic of the Union of Burma	
Battle rifles/Assault rifles
BA-63	Battle rifle	Clone of the Heckler & Koch G3 rifle - full length battle rifle variant Sub designations - Light machine gun (BA-64), Carbine (BA-72) and Precision rifle (BA-100)	7.62×51mm NATO	West Germany; Socialist Republic of the Union of Burma	
BA-72	Battle rifle	Clone of the Heckler & Koch G3 rifle - shortened barrel carbine variant	7.62×51mm NATO	West Germany; Socialist Republic of the Union of Burma	
M16A1	Assault rifle	Used by Border Guard Forces	5.56×45mm NATO	United States	
MA-1 MK-I	Assault rifle	AK-style rifle based on the IMI Galil	5.56×45mm NATO	Israel; Socialist Republic of the Union of Burma / Union of Myanmar	
MA-1 MK-II	Assault rifle	Updated version which resolves reliability issues among other things	5.56×45mm NATO	Israel; Socialist Republic of the Union of Burma / Union of Myanmar	
MA-1 MK-III	Assault rifle (bullpup)	Clone of the QBZ-97	5.56×45mm NATO	China; Union of Myanmar	
MA-4 MK-I	Assault rifle with M203 grenade launcher	Version of the MA-1 MK-I with grenade launching capability	5.56×45mm NATO	Israel; Socialist Republic of the Union of Burma / Union of Myanmar	
MA-4 MK-II	Assault rifle with M203 grenade launcher	Updated version of the MA-4 MK-I with grenade launching capability	5.56×45mm NATO	Israel; Union of Myanmar	
MA-4 MK-III	Assault rifle (bullpup) with M203 grenade launcher	Version of the MA-1 MK-III with grenade launching capability	5.56×45mm NATO	China; Union of Myanmar / Myanmar	
MA-11	Assault rifle	Rifle based on the Heckler & Koch HK33	5.56×45mm NATO	West Germany; Socialist Republic of the Union of Burma / Union of Myanmar	
Norinco CQ	Assault rifle	Used by the Border Guard Forces	5.56×45mm NATO	China	
QBZ-97	Assault rifle (bullpup)		5.56×45mm NATO	China	
Type 56	Assault rifle		7.62×39mm	China	
Light machine guns
BA-64	Light machine gun	Clone of the Heckler & Koch G3 rifle - light machine gun variant	7.62×51mm NATO	West Germany; Socialist Republic of the Union of Burma	
MA-12	Light machine gun	Light support machine gun variant of the MA-11	5.56×45mm NATO	Germany; Union of Myanmar / Myanmar	
MA-2 MK-I	Light machine gun	MA-2 MK-I A1 (upgraded variant of MA-2 MK-I)	5.56×45mm NATO	Israel; Socialist Republic of the Union of Burma / Union of Myanmar	
MA-2 MK-II	Light machine gun		5.56×45mm NATO	Israel; Union of Myanmar	
Sniper rifles
BA100	Designated marksman rifle	Clone of the Heckler & Koch G3 rifle - marksman variant	7.62×51mm NATO	Germany; Union of Myanmar / Myanmar	
MAS-1 MK-I	Designated marksman rifle	AK-based designated marksman rifle similar to the Zastava M76	7.62×51mm NATO	Yugoslavia; Socialist Republic of the Union of Burma	
MAS-1 MK-II	Designated marksman rifle	Updated version of the MAS-1 MK-I internally based on an elongated version of AK-74 design but shares more external similarities with the Dragunov sniper rifle (similar to PSL and M91) using PSO-1 scope with modified reticles to match the ballistic of 7.62×51mm NATO	7.62×51mm NATO	Union of Myanmar / Myanmar	
Steyr SSG 69	Sniper rifle		7.62×51mm NATO	Austria	
General-purpose machine gun
MA-15	General-purpose machine gun	Clone of the Rheinmetall MG3	7.62×51mm NATO	West Germany; Socialist Republic of the Union of Burma	
M60	General-purpose machine gun	Used by Border Guard Forces	7.62×51mm NATO	United States	
Heavy machine guns
STK 50MG	Heavy machine gun	Licence built as "MA-16 "	.50 BMG	Singapore; Socialist Republic of the Union of Burma / Union of Myanmar	
M2 Browning	Heavy machine gun		.50 BMG	United States	
KPV heavy machine gun	Heavy machine gun		14.5×114mm	Soviet Union	

== Land mines ==
Photo	Model	Type	Origin	Quantity	Notes
	MM-1	Stake mounted anti-personnel fragmentation mine	Soviet Union; Socialist Republic of the Union of Burma	Unknown	Copy of Soviet POMZ-2 mine. Manufactured by Myanmar Defense Products Industries at Ngyaung Chay Dauk, in Bago Region. The mine is used by the Myanmar Army.
	MM-2	Anti-personnel mine	Soviet Union; Socialist Republic of the Union of Burma	Unknown	Copy of Soviet PMN-1 mine. The mine is used by the Myanmar Army.
	M14	Anti-personnel mine	United States; Union of Myanmar	Unknown	Unlicensed copies of the M14 landmine may have been manufactured by Myanmar Defense Products Industries since 2008. The mine is used by the Myanmar Army.
	M16	Bounding anti-personnel mine	United States; Union of Myanmar	Unknown	Copy produced locally.
	M7	Anti-tank mine	United States	Unknown	
	Type 59	Anti-tank mine	China; Socialist Republic of the Union of Burma	Unknown	Copy produced locally.

== Anti-tank weapons ==
Photo	Model	Origin	Quantity	Notes
Anti-tank guided missiles
	R-2 Bar'yer	Ukraine	300	For MT-LB armoured vehicles and infantry use. Variant of BA'YER anti-tank guided missile system, capable of penetrating 800mm of Rolled Homogeneous Armor (RHA) behind ERA. Maximum range: 5000m.
Recoilless rifles
	M40 recoilless rifle	United StatesSpainPakistan	1000+	More than 1,000 M40A1 RCLs in service as of 2016, including Spain-made CSR-106s and Pakistani-made M40A1s used for bunker busting and anti-personnel/infantry support role in counter-insurgency campaigns.
	M20 recoilless rifle	United StatesChina	Unknown	Both American and Chinese Type 52 and Type 56.
	MA-14	Soviet Union; China; Socialist Republic of the Union of Burma	Unknown	Copy of Chinese Type 78 version of the B-10 in 81mm caliber.
	Carl Gustaf 8.4cm recoilless rifle	Sweden	1000	Anti-tank weapon
	MA-84(BA-84)	SwedenUnion of Myanmar	Unknown	Copy of the M2 variant of Carl Gustaf 8.4cm recoilless rifle
	MA-84 MKII	SwedenMyanmar	Unknown	Copy of the M3 MAAWS (2011) variant of Carl Gustaf 8.4 cm recoilless rifle.
Rocket-propelled grenades
	RPG-7	Soviet UnionRussia	Unknown	Anti-tank weapon
	Type 69 RPG	Soviet UnionChina	Unknown	Chinese copy version of RPG-7.
	MA-10	Soviet UnionSocialist Republic of the Union of Burma	Unknown	Copy of the RPG-7

== Mortars ==
Photo	Model	Type	Origin	Quantity	Notes
	Type-56	160 mm mortar	China	Unknown	
	UBM-52	120 mm mortar	Yugoslavia	25	Received from Yugoslavia in 1971. Modernized and still in use.
	Soltam K6	120 mm mortar	Israel	80	
	Soltam M-65	120 mm mortar	Israel	100	
	Type-53	120 mm calibre smoothbore mortar	China	Unknown	
	Type-55	120 mm calibre smoothbore mortar	China	Unknown	
	Type 67 mortar	82 mm mortar	China	100	
	M29 mortar	81 mm mortar	United States	Unknown	
	M43 mortar	81 mm mortar	United States	100	
	M19 mortar	60 mm calibre smoothbore mortar	United States	Unknown	
	BA-90	81 mm extended range mortar	Socialist Republic of the Union of Burma	Unknown	Up to 400 units a year and ammunitions produced by Myanmar Defence Products Industries (MDPI) since the late 80s. Widely used in combat against insurgents. Being replaced with locally made MA-8 mortars.
	BA-97	120 mm extended range mortar	Socialist Republic of the Union of Burma	Unknown	Up to 50 pieces a year and ammunitions produced by MDPI since the late 80s. Widely used in combat against insurgents. Renamed as MA-6 MK-II in the 2000s.
	BA-100	60mm commando mortar	Socialist Republic of the Union of Burma	Unknown	Up to 400 units a year and ammunitions produced by MDPI since the late 80s. Widely used in combat against insurgents. Being replaced with locally made MA-9 commando mortars.
	MA-6	120 mm extended range mortar	Socialist Republic of the Union of Burma / Union of Myanmar	Unknown	Up to 50 pieces a year and ammunitions produced by MDPI. Widely used in combat against insurgents. Shown at the Defense and Security Exhibition 2019.
	MA-7	60 mm extended range mortar	Union of Myanmar	Unknown	Used as an infantry fire support weapon. Up to 400 pieces a year and ammunitions produced by MDPI. Widely used in combat against insurgents. Shown at the Defense and Security Exhibition 2019.
	MA-8	81 mm extended range mortar	Union of Myanmar / Myanmar	Unknown	Used as an infantry fire support weapon. Up to 400 pieces a year and ammunitions produced by MDPI. Widely used in combat against insurgents. Shown at the Defense and Security Exhibition 2019.
	MA-9	60mm commando mortar	Myanmar	Unknown	Used as an infantry fire support weapon. Up to 400 pieces a year and ammunitions produced by MDPI. Widely used in combat against insurgents. Shown at the Defense and Security Exhibition 2019.

== Armoured fighting vehicles ==
Name	Quantity	Origin	Image	Notes
Main Battle Tanks (~800+)
T-90S	500Planned	Russia		
T-55	Unknown	Russia		Sold by India in 2008
T-72S	300	Russia		Sold by Russia and received in Between 2008 to 2011
Type-59D	250	China		
Type-69-ll	100	China		
Type-90-ll	200	China	(MBT-2000/VT-1)	
Light tanks (~105)
Type 63	105	China		
Assault Guns (150+)
PTL-02	150+	China		At least more than twelve units were destroyed by rebel forces
Reconnaissance vehicles (~500+)
AML-90	50+ were in service as of 2022	France		At least two units were destroyed by rebel forces
BRDM-2MS	100+	Soviet Union / Russian Federation		Received from Russia after the 2021 Myanmar Coup.
EE-9 Cascavel	150	Brazil		Refurbished and sold by Israel
MAV-1	250+	Union of Myanmar		
Infantry fighting vehicles (~1000+)
BTR-3U	800+	Ukraine / Union of Myanmar		500+ BTR-3Us in service. 10+ BTR-3Us bought from Ukraine in 2001. Kyiv signed a US$500 million contract in 2004 to supply 1000 BTR-3U armoured personnel carriers (APCs). Purchased as kits to be assembled locally until 2013. According to Building the Tatmadaw report, the Myanmar Army was operating more than 500 BTR-3Us as of 2008. According to Amnesty International, the last batch with 368 BTR-3Us was delivered as of January 2013.
MT-LBMSh	350+	Ukraine / Union of Myanmar		
Armoured personnel carriers (1500+)
ZSD-85	~350	China		
ZSD-90	200	China		
ZSL-92	450+	China		one of the most widely use IFV of Myanmar Army. More than four units had been destroyed by rebel forces
BAAC-87	n/a	Socialist Republic of the Union of Burma		
Gaia Thunder	unknown	Israel		Received from Israel in 2017 and unveiled in 2021 coup.
MPV	250+	India		First batch of MPV were received in 2004. Second batch in 2018 and unknown units were receive in 2020
AUV (n/a)
MAV-2	100+	Union of Myanmar / Myanmar		
MAV-3	100+	Union of Myanmar / Myanmar		

== Prototypes ==
Photo	Model	Type	Quantity	Origin	Notes
Light tanks
	MMT-40	Light tank	80+ including MMT-40 MK-1 and MK-2	Ukraine Myanmar	Light tank with 105 mm gun, based on 2S1 chassis. One tank unveiled in 2017. Producing with Ukraine's technical assistance and called MMT-40.

== Armoured vehicles ==
Photo	Model	Type	Quantity	Origin	Notes
Armoured vehicle/infantry fighting vehicle
	BTR-4EM	Infantry fighting vehicle/Armoured personnel carrier	200+	Ukraine	Joint-venture with Ukraine to assemble BTR-4 kits in Myanmar.Euipped with new turret system.
Armoured vehicle/Armoured personnel carrier
	ZFB-05	Armoured personnel carrier	unknown	China	Received in 2011. Later, they were transferred to police.
	M-3 VTT	Armoured personnel carrier	10	France; Israel	10 M-3 VTT armoured vehicles. Used vehicles refurbished by Israel before delivery. Received in 2011. Supplier probably Israel.
Armoured vehicle/Mine-Resistant Ambush Protected
	Amir	Mine-Resistant Ambush Protected	unknown	Israel	Received in 2019.
Armoured vehicle-launched bridges
	GQL-111	Armoured vehicle-launched bridge	Unknown	China	Unveiled at the Bayint Naung Military Exercise 2014.
	MT-55A	Armoured vehicle-launched bridge	16	Soviet Union	Received from Russia
	Type 84	Armoured vehicle-launched bridge	Unknown	China	
Armoured recovery vehicles
	Type-92	Armoured recovery vehicle	76	China	Received in 2011. Also known as ZSL-92 armoured recovery vehicle.
	BTS-4 upgraded	Armoured recovery vehicle	14	Soviet Union	Received from Ukraine in 2019.
	Type-93(ZJX-93)	Armoured recovery vehicle	18	China	Using together with MBT-2000.
	F.R.V	Field recovery vehicle	Unknown	Myanmar	Armoured field recovery vehicle developed by Electronic Engineering Force of Myanmar Army.
	Type 653	Armoured recovery vehicle	18	China	
	GSL-130	Armoured mine clearance vehicle	Unknown	China	Armoured anti-mine vehicle, based on WZ-131 chassis

== Utility vehicles ==
Photo	Model	Type	Origin	Notes
Light utility vehicles
	Naung Yoe (Version-1)	Military light utility vehicle/Tactical off-road vehicle	Myanmar	One of the off-road vehicles produced in Myanmar. Produced several variants at the Tatmadaw Heavy Industry located in Htonbo. Production was substituted with Innlay off-road vehicle in 2016.
	Naung Yoe (Version-2)	Military light utility vehicle/Tactical off-road vehicle	Myanmar	One of the off-road vehicles produced in Myanmar. Produced several variants at the Tatmadaw Heavy Industry located in Htonbo. Production was substituted with Innlay off-road vehicle in 2016.
	Naung Yoe (Version-3)	Military light utility vehicle/Tactical off-road vehicle	Myanmar	One of the off-road vehicles produced in Myanmar. Produced several variants at the Tatmadaw Heavy Industry located in Htonbo. Production was substituted with Innlay off-road vehicle in 2016.
	Naung Yoe (Version-4)	Military light utility vehicle/Tactical off-road vehicle	Myanmar	One of the off-road vehicles produced in Myanmar. Produced several variants at the Tatmadaw Heavy Industry located in Htonbo. Production was substituted with Innlay off-road vehicle in 2016.
	Innlay Tactical Jeep (Version-1)	Military light utility vehicle/Tactical off-road vehicle	Myanmar	4x4 tactical off-road vehicles. Producing at the Tatmadaw Heavy Industries located in Magway and Htonbo. Producing 200 per year. Production run since 2016.
	Innlay Tactical Jeep (Version-2)	Military light utility vehicle/Tactical off-road vehicle	Myanmar	4x4 tactical off-road vehicles. Producing at the Tatmadaw Heavy Industries located in Magway and Htonbo. Producing 200 per year. Production run since 2016.
	Mazda Pathfinder XV-1	Off-road vehicle	Myanmar	Assembled by the Myanmar Ministry of Industry at the No.(2) Auto Mobile Factory, Htonbo in 1970s. Now, they are being substituted with Innlay off-road vehicle.
Sport utility vehicles
	Tata Safari Storm	SUV	India	Handed to the Tatmadaw by the Indian ambassador.
Pickup trucks
	Tata Xenon GS 800	Pickup truck	India	
	Zhongxing Grand Tiger	Pickup truck	China; Myanmar	Myanmar Ministry of Industry is now assembling “Grand Tiger Pickups” at the Htonbo factory. 500 sold.
Trucks
	Sinotruk HOWO	Multi-purpose tactical truck	China	One of the most widely use military trucks in Myanmar.
	Mil-truk	Multi-purpose tactical truck	ChinaMyanmar	Licensed-production of Chinese Sinotruk HOWO military trucks.Producing several variants at the Tatmadaw Heavy Industries.
	Shaanxi SX-21090	Multi-purpose tactical truck	China	One of the most widely use military trucks in Myanmar.
	Dongfeng EQ2102	Multi-purpose tactical truck	China	Myanmar ordered Dongfeng EQ2102 military trucks in 1990s and received them between 1997 and 2002. Myanmar Army also using Dongfeng EQ1091 and Dongfeng EQ1093 trucks.
	FAW Jiefang 141	Multi-purpose tactical truck	China	China exported FAW models military trucks to Myanmar.
	FAW Jiefang CA-1122J	Multi-purpose tactical truck	China	China exported FAW models military trucks to Myanmar.
	Nissan Diesel	Multi-purpose tactical truck	Japan	Purchased in 1988. Substituting with locally made Mil-truk trucks.

== Multiple launch rocket systems ==
Photo	Model	Variant	Origin	Quantity	Notes
Multiple rocket launchers
	Weishi Rockets	SY-400	China	Unknown	300 mm multiple rocket launcher system and BP-12A ballistic missile. The first batch received in 2020.
	M-1985	M-1991, MAM-02 (MA240)	North Korea; Socialist Republic of the Union of Burma	100+ M-1985/M-1991 and 250+ MAM-02	240mm multiple rocket launcher system M-1991 version in use in Myanmar has only twelve launcher tubes which are fitted on the Iveco Eurotrakker 380E42 6x6 truck. Two deliveries of larger caliber truck-mounted multiple rocket launcher system received from North Korea in 2008 and 2010.
	BM-21 Grad	9P138 "Grad-1"	Russia	230,	Used in Battle of Border Post-9631 with Thailand in 2001. Only 100 in service as of 2020. They are upgraded with the turrets and rocket launchers of MAM-01. The rest of 9P138 "Grad-1" were substituted with MAM-01.
	Type 81	Type 81	China	120	122mm multiple rocket launcher system. Ordered in 2010 and received in 2012. Unveiled at the 69th Armed Force Day Parade (2014).
	Type 81	Type 90B MAM-01	China	120	122mm multiple rocket launcher system. Ordered in 2004 and received in 2006. Still does not unveiled to the public yet.
	MAM-01 (MA122)	MAM-01 (early version)	Union of Myanmar / Myanmar	200+ MAM-01 250+ MAM-01A and 150+ MAM-01B	122mm multiple rocket launcher system. The first variant of MAM-01 multiple launch rocket systems. Based on North Korea's BM-11 technology. Produced in 2004 and the number is not more than 20. Each system has 40 launchers which are fitted on an Iveco Eurotrakker 380E42 6x6 truck.
	MAM-01 (MA122)	MAM-01A (improved version)	Union of Myanmar / Myanmar	200+ MAM-01 250+ MAM-01A and 150+ MAM-01B	Upgraded variant of MAM-01 rocket artillery with Digital Fire Control System and the range of the rocket types are extended to 35–40 km. Based on People's Republic of China and North Korea design. Each system has 40 launchers which are fitted on a locally made Mil-truk chassis. This variant is in mass production since 2010.
	MAM-01 (MA122)	MAM-01B	Union of Myanmar / Myanmar	200+ MAM-01 250+ MAM-01A and 150+ MAM-01B	122mm multiple rocket launcher system. The latest variant of MAM-01 multiple launch rocket systems. Producing started in 2019. Each system has 40 launchers which are fitted on a new locally made Mil-truk 6x4 truck which is similar to Ukraine's KrAZ-540 1NE truck.
	Type 63		China	unknown	107 mm multiple rocket launcher. Received in 1993.

== Artillery systems ==
Photo	Model	Origin	Quantity	Notes
Self-propelled artillery
	Norinco SH1	China	150	155 mm self-propelled howitzer. For six battalions.
	Nora B-52	Serbia	40+	155 mm self-propelled howitzer.
	2S1U	Soviet Union	Unknown	Ukraine's military import/export agency, has signed a joint venture agreement with Myanmar for the construction of an armoured vehicle assembly plant. Not in service.
Towed artillery
	KH-179	South Korea	100+	155 mm howitzer
	Soltam M-845P	Israel	unknown	155 mm 45 calibre towed gun howitzer. Received in 1998.
	Type 59-1	China	160+	130 mm field gun. Received from China in 1998.
	D-30M	Soviet Union	560+	122 mm howitzer. Received from Russia between 2004 and 2006.
	BL 5.5-inch medium gun	UK	200+	5.5 inch (140 mm) gun. Status unclear. May not be in service
	M101 howitzer	United States	100+	105 mm M2A1
	Indian Field Gun	India	10	105 mm gun. Provided by India in 2006 to fight Assamese rebels operating out of Myanmar.
	M-56	Yugoslavia and other	250+	Types: M2A1/M56 and others. Not including modern towed guns.
	Ordnance QF 25-pounder	UK	150+	87.6 mm gun. Status unclear. May not be in service
	M48	Yugoslavia	100	76 mm mountain gun. Status unclear. May not be in service
	75/24	India		75 mm HE
	M2A1/M2A2	Yugoslavia		105mm HE M51 A5, HE M 564, SMK WP
	M42	Yugoslavia		76mm HE M70, HEAT BK 354

== Ballistic missiles ==
Photo	Model	Origin	Quantity	Notes
Possessing
	Hwasong-5	North Korea	Unknown	Scud missile with range: 300 km. North Korea transferred Hwasong-5 (Scud-B) missile technology with the experts to Myanmar in 2008. In 2014, China told United Nations monitors that North Korean-made ballistic, missile-related alloy rods destined for Myanmar had been found on a ship docked in China.
	Hwasong-6	North Korea	Unknown	Scud missile with range: 700 km. Imported in 2009.
	BP-12A	China	Unknown	Tactical ballistc missile part of SY-400 rocket artillery system. 400 km maximum range.
Possible possessing
	M-11	China	Unknown	Ballistic missile with range:+300 km. In the 1990s, China agreed to sell some M-11s to Myanmar. Unclear if China actually exported the missiles to Myanmar.

== Equipments ==
The following is the list of equipments used by air defence battalions of Myanmar.

=== Anti-aircraft guns(AAA) ===
Model	Origin	Year of receipt	Quantity	Notes
Type-87	China	2005-2010	380	Chinese variant of Soviet ZU-23-2 in 25x183mmB calibre.
Type-74	China	2000-2005	24	37 mm AAA.
Type 59	China	2010	Unknown	Anti-aircraft gun (57mm) based on AZP S-60.Received hundreds of this type in 2010.
MR-4	Romania	2000-2005	200	Romanian variant of ZPU-4.
MAA-01 35mm anti-aircraft gun	Myanmar	2012present (licence built)	200+ (as of 2020)	Locally producing with the Chinese assistance. Similar to Chinese Type-90 35 mm twin AA gun.
Type-87 self-propelled anti-aircraft guns	Myanmar	2010-2016	Unknown	Chinese Type-87 25 mm twin AA guns, produced in local with TOT, are fitted on the Dongfeng EQ-2102 trucks. Each anti-aircraft artillery/air defence division comprises three battalions equipped with these AA guns.

=== Man portable air defence systems(MANPADs) ===
Model	Origin	Year of receipt	Quantity	Notes
Igla-1E (SA-16 Gimlet)	Bulgaria; Union of Myanmar	2010present (licensed production)	2100	Very short-range portable surface-to-air missile. 100 SA-16s received from Bulgaria in 1999. A total of 2000 units of SA-16s producing in locally with TOT between 2004 and 2014.
Igla (SA-18 Grouse)	Russian Federation	Unknown	100	Very short-range portable surface-to-air missile. For infantry use.
Igla-S (SA-24 Grinch)	Russian Federation	2015-2018	400	Very short-range portable surface-to-air missile. For infantry use.
HN-5A	China	1990-1992	200	Possibly being retired.

=== Air defence systems(SAM) ===
Model	Origin	Year of receipt	Quantity	Notes
Long-range air defence system
FK-3	China	2022	unknown	medium to long range air-defence system. Receive from China since 2021
S-200 Dubna (SA-5 Gammon)	Russia	2008	20	Long-range air defence system. North Korea have shipped as many as 20 S-200 launchers to Myanmar. Unclear as to how many units remain in service
Medium-range air defence systems
Pechora-2M (SA-3 Goa)	Russia	2010-2014	8 systems (batteries)	Medium range surface-to-air missile system. Total of 30 launching vehicles.
Kub 2K12M2 (SA-6 "Gainful")	Belarus	2008-2010	24	Medium-range surface to air missile system.
Kub/Buk Kavadrat-M (SA-6 "Gainful")	Belarus	2016	6 batteries	Medium range surface-to-air missile system. Received in 2016.
KS-1A	China	2014-2015	16 batteries (Four KS-1A batteries and the rest are KS-1M batteries)	Medium-range surface-to-air missile system.
KS-1M	Myanmar	2015-2020(Locally producing)	16 batteries (Four KS-1A batteries and the rest are KS-1M batteries)	Medium range surface-to-air missile system. Producing under licence in Myanmar. According to the licence, 12 batteries will be produced by 2020.
S-75M3 Volga-2 (SA-2 Guideline)	Russia	2004 and 2008	48	48 surface-to-air missile launchers and 250 missiles received in 2008.
BAE Dynamics Bloodhound Mk.II	United Kingdom	1999-2000	60 launchers	Supplied by Singapore.Possibly retired from service.
Self-propelled short-range air defence systems
Pantsir-S1 (SA-22 Greyhound)	Russia	On order		Ordered in 2020.
TOR-M1 (SA-15 Gauntlet)	Russia	2004-2008	Unknown	For critical areas.
2K22M Tunguska (SA-19 "Grison")	Russia	2004-2007(38 units) and 2019(3 units)	41	Total of 38 acquired from Russia between 2004 and 2007 and 3 from Ukraine in 2019
MADV	Myanmar	2009-2014(locally produced)	180 (as of 2013)	Air defence variants of locally made Naung Yoe armoured vehicle (utility version). Four Igla mounted MADVs are standard organic AD systems for the Infantry Brigades. Using SA-16 surface-to-air missiles.

== Anti-aircraft guns ==
Photo	Model	Origin	Quantity	Notes
	Type-87	China	380	Chinese variant of Soviet ZU-23-2 in 25x183mmB calibre.
	Type-74	China	24	37 mm
	Type 59	China	Unknown	Anti-aircraft gun (57mm) based on AZP S-60
	MR-4	Socialist Republic of Romania	200	Romanian variant of ZPU-4.
	MAA-01 35 mm anti-aircraft gun	Socialist Republic of the Union of Burma	10 (as of 2017)	Locally producing with the Chinese assistance. Similar to Chinese Type-90 35 mm twin AA gun.
	25 mm self-propelled anti-aircraft guns	Socialist Republic of the Union of Burma	Unknown	Chinese Type-87 25 mm twin AA guns, produced in local with TOT, are fitted on the Dongfeng EQ-2102 trucks. Each anti-aircraft artillery/air defence division comprises three battalions equipped with these AA guns.
	Bofors 40mm L/60 Or L/70	Sweden	Unknown	Rate of Fire : 120-140 per minute L/60 And 240-330 Per Minute L/70

== Radars ==
The following list includes the radar systems in service with the Myanmar Army Artillery Corps and the Bureau of Air Defence.

Photo	Model	Type	Maximum range	Quantity	Origin	Notes
Air search radar
	YLC-2V	Three-dimensional main guidance and surveillance radar	500 km+	Unknown	China	In 2014, China sold unknown amount of YLC-2V radars to Myanmar.
	1L117 "Big Bar"	S-band long range 3D air surveillance radar	450 km	Unknown	Russia	Part of Myanmar Integrated Air Defence System. Used as air search radars for the air defence systems of the army and the air force. Fitted in all radar stations of Myanmar
	Galaxy Radar System	Early warning radar	300 km	Unknown	Ukraine	Part of Myanmar Integrated Air Defence System. Used as early warning radars for the air defence systems of the army and the air force. Fitted in all radar stations of Myanmar
	P-37 radar	Early-warning radar	350 km	Unknown	Russia	Upgraded variant of P-35 radar.
	JY-8A	Surface search and target acquisition radar	150 km	1	China	Received in 1993. Stripped-down version of JY-8
	JLP-40	Air search radar	270 km	3	China	Received in 1988.
	ST-68U Tin Shield(36D6M)	Air search radar	200 km	2	Ukraine	Received in 2002.
	JLG-43	Height finding radar	200 km	3	China	Received in 1988.
	P-18M	Early warning radar	250 km	Unknown	Russia	Part of Pechora 2M.
	Fan Song M	Fire control and tracking radar	145 km	Unknown	Russia	Part of S-75M3
	H-200 radar	Passive phased array air search radar	100 km+	Unknown	China	Part of KS-1A/M medium range surface-to-air missile
	Upgraded 1S91 "Straight Flush" radar	G/H band target acquisition and distribution radar	75 km	Unknown	Russia	Target Acquisition and Distribution Radar of Myanmar's 2K12 Kub and Kavadat-M air defence systems. Part of 2K12 Kub and Kavadat-M
	Upgraded SRN-125 "Low Bow" radar	I/D-band tracking, fire control and guidance radar	40 km	Unknown	Russia	Tracking, fire control and guidance radar of Myanmar Army's Pechora-2M Air Defence System. Always shown at the annual Armed Forces Day Parade.
	TH-5711 Smart Hunter	Air search radar	30 km	Unknown	People's Republic of China	Five units received from People's Republic of China in 2010. Used as targeting radar for locally made MAA-01 and 25mm truck mounted AA guns. Produced locally under licence from the People's Republic of China and mounted on indigenous trucks. Smart Hunters are used to detect and track low flying targets such as light aircraft and helicopters.
	1RS2-1E	Target acquisition radar and dual waveband tracking radar	36 km	Unknown	Russia	Part of Pantisr S-1.
	1RL144M	Air search radar	18 km	Unknown	Russia	Part of 2K22 Tunguska.

== Unmanned aerial vehicles ==
Photo	Model	Type	Quantity	Origin	Notes
	Orlan-10E	Surveillance unmanned aerial vehicles	Unknown	Russia	On order.
	Elbit Skylark I	Surveillance unmanned aerial vehicles	Unknown	Israel	One Elbit Skylark I unmanned aerial vehicles with three young men seized by Arakan Army in 2020.

== Historical equipment ==
This table includes only the retired equipment of Myanmar Army.

=== Small arms ===
Name	Type	Versions	Ammunition	Origin	Picture	Notes
Webley Revolver	Service revolver	Webley MkIV service revolver	.38 S&W	United Kingdom		Inherited from British Burma Army
Enfield No. 2	Service revolver		.38 S&W	United Kingdom		Inherited from British Burma Army
Smith & Wesson Model 10	Service revolver		.38 S&W	United Kingdom		Inherited from British Burma Army
M1911 pistol	Service pistol		.45 ACP	United States		Military aid from United States in 1950s
Zastava M57	Service pistol	M70A para	9×19mm Parabellum	Yugoslavia		Used as stop-gap in the 1990s
Lanchester submachine gun	Submachine gun		9×19mm Parabellum	United Kingdom		Inherited from British era Burma navy
Sten	Submachine gun		9×19mm Parabellum	United Kingdom		Inherited from British Burma Army
Sterling submachine gun	Submachine gun		9×19mm Parabellum	United Kingdom		Bought from the United Kingdom and India
M3 submachine gun	Submachine gun		.45 ACP	United States		Military aid from the United States in 1950s
Thompson submachine gun	Submachine gun	M1A1	.45 ACP	United States		Inherited from British Burma Army and also Military aid from the United States in 1950s
BA-52 (Ne Win Sten)	Submachine gun		9×19mm Parabellum	Socialist Republic of the Union of Burma		Substituted between 1970s and 1980s.
M1903 Springfield	Bolt action		.30-06 Springfield	United States		Military aid from the United States in 1950s and mainly used in battlefield engineering units
M1917 Enfield	Bolt action		.30-06 Springfield	United States		Military aid from the United States in 1950s and mainly used in battlefield engineering units
M1 Garand	Semi-automatic rifle		.30-06 Springfield	United States		Military aid from the United States in 1950s and also captured from local insurgents and kumintons
Lee–Enfield	Bolt action		.303 British	British Empire		Inherited from British Burma Army and also bought from India. Main service rifle in 1950s
Arisaka	Bolt action service rifle	Type 38	6.5×50mmSR Arisaka	Empire of Japan		Used by the Burma Independence Army until 1947. The Myanmar Army also used them until 1960s.
FN FAL	Battle rifle		7.62×51mm NATO	Belgium		Used surplus ex-German G1s and used as stop gaps before HK G3s
ArmaLite AR-10	Battle rifle		7.62×51mm NATO	United States		Bought from the United States in late 1950s
Bren light machine gun	Light machine gun		.303 British	United Kingdom		Inherited from British Burma Army and also bought from India. Main LMG in 1950s
MG 42	General-purpose machine gun	M53	7.92×57mm Mauser	Yugoslavia		Bought from Yugoslavia in 1950s and later converted to 7.62mmNATO with the help of Germany
M79 grenade launcher	Grenade launcher		40 mm grenade	United States		

=== Anti-tank weapons ===
Name	Type	Versions	Ammunition	Origin	Picture	Notes
Bazooka	Anti-tank rocket launcher	M9A1	2.36 inch (60 mm)	United States		Inherited from British Burma Army and also Military aid from the United States in 1950s
Super Bazooka	Anti-tank rocket launcher	M20 Super Bazooka	3.5 in (88.9 mm) caliber warhead	United States		Military aid from the United States in 1960s and main man portable anti tank weapon used until 1990s
RPG-2	Anti-tank rocket launcher	BA-103	40 mm barrel 82mm warhead	Soviet Union		Received from Israel in 1980s and used extensively in 1980s and 90s
Ordnance QF 6-pounder	Anti-tank gun		Fixed QF 57×441 mmR	United Kingdom		Inherited from British Burma Army

=== Mortars ===
Name	Type	Versions	Ammunition	Origin	Picture	Notes
Two-inch mortar	Light mortar		2 inch (50.8 mm)	United Kingdom		Inherited from British Burma Army and also bought from India. Main light mortar used until 1990s
ML 3-inch mortar	Medium mortar		3.2 in (81 mm)	United Kingdom		Inherited from British Burma Army and also bought from India. Main medium mortar used until 1970s
2-inch mortar	Light mortar		2 inch (50.8 mm)	Myanmar		Copy produced mortars based on British Two-inch mortar. Substituted with BA-series motars in 1990s.
3-inch mortar	Medium mortar		3.2 in (81 mm)	Myanmar		Copy produced mortars based on British ML 3-inch mortar. Substituted with BA-series motars in 1990s.

=== Tanks and armoured vehicles ===
Photo	Model	Type	Origin	Notes
Tanks
	Comet	Cruiser tank	United Kingdom	Received in 1950. Retired in 1992. Two operational seen during the 76th Armed Forces Day Parade.
	Type 62	Light tank	China	
Armoured vehicles
	T-16 Universal Carrier	Armoured carrier	United Kingdom	American-built. Received in 1950, 1952, 1959. Retired in 1972. Three operational seen during the 76th Armed Forces Day Parade.
	Humber Pig	Armoured personnel carrier	United Kingdom	Retired in 1992. Three operational seen during the 76th Armed Forces Day Parade.
	Ferret	Armoured car	United Kingdom	Retired in 1992. Three operational seen during the 76th Armed Forces Day Parade.
	Daimler Armoured Car	Armoured car	United Kingdom	Retired in 1982. Three operational seen during the 76th Armed Forces Day Parade.
	BAAC-72	Armoured personnel carrier	Myanmar	Production started in 1972. Only a few produced. Retired in late 1990s.
	BAAC-83	Infantry fighting vehicle, armoured personnel carrier	Myanmar	Production started in 1983. Fewer than 50 units produced. Retired in 2000.
	BAAC-84	Infantry fighting vehicle/Armoured reconnaissance vehicle	Myanmar	Production started in 1984. Fewer than 50 units produced. Retired in 2000.
	BAAC-85	Infantry fighting vehicle/Armoured reconnaissance vehicle	Myanmar	Production started in 1985. Fewer than 50 units produced. Retired in 2000.
	BAAC-86	Infantry fighting vehicle/Armoured reconnaissance vehicle	Myanmar	Production started in 1986. Fewer than 50 units produced. Retired in 2000.
	MAV-4 (4x4)	Infantry fighting vehicle/Armoured personnel carrier	Myanmar	Fitted with a 0.5 inch machine gun. Production, few in number. Stopped at prototype level.
	ULARV-1 (4x4)	Armoured reconnaissance vehicle	Myanmar	Three variants. The first variant comes with a 14.5 mm heavy machine gun; the second with a CIWS; and the third with the Igla turret and a 14.5 mm heavy machine gun. The program was replaced with BTR-3 procurement program.
	ULARV-2 (4x4)	Armoured reconnaissance vehicle	Myanmar	14.5 mm machine gun and short range Igla turret.Amphibious armoured vehicles. The program was replaced with BTR-3 procurement program.
	ULARV-3 (6x6)	Armoured reconnaissance vehicle	Myanmar	One prototype unveiled in 2012. Mass production expected in 2015 but this procurement program put on hold and replaced by BTR-3 procurement program.
