= MA1 =

MA-1 may refer to:

- Bennett MA-1 ventilator, a powerful medical ventilator to assist respiration
- Fire control system used on the F-106 interceptor
- MA-1 bomber jacket, a nylon flight jacket
- DI MA-1 rifle, a Myanma variant of the IMI Galil
- U.S. Route 1 in Massachusetts
- Massachusetts's 1st congressional district
- HD Radio's AM hybrid mode
- Mercury-Atlas 1, a test flight of Project Mercury
- Mal'ta boy, Paleolithic human remains
