= Myanmar Directorate of Defence Industries =

Military industry by country

- ကာကွယ်ရေးပစ္စည်းစက်ရုံများညွှန်ကြားရေးမှူးရုံး
- Founded: 1950; 76 years ago
- Country: Myanmar
- Branch: Under Military Training General, Chief of Staff
- Type: Defence product industries
- Part of: Tatmadaw

The Myanmar Directorate of Defence Industries (Burmese: ကာကွယ်ရေး ပစ္စည်းစက်ရုံများ ညွှန်ကြားရေးမှူးရုံး; BGN/PCGN: Kagwèye Passizetyônmya Hnywan-Gyayehmuyôn; abbreviated DI), also known as Directorate of Defence Industries, Defence Product Industry and Defence Product Industries or by its Burmese name, Karkweye Pyitsee Setyoun, (Ka Pa Sa) is a state-owned enterprise that is officially part of the Tatmadaw.

DI is responsible for producing military equipment throughout the country for the Myanmar Army, the Myanmar Navy and the Myanmar Air Force. It is the only company that has monopolized firearms production.

== History ==
The DI was established in the 1950s under the General Staff Office. The first indigenous firearm produced in Myanmar is the TZ-45, made under license as the BA52. In 1953, Heckler & Koch and Fritz Werner Industrie-Ausrüstungen GmbH cooperated with Myanmar to create a production line to made G3 battle rifles under license. The first Myanmar-made G3, known as the BA63, was first produced in 1957. The use of the BA rifles ended in the 1990s when the MA-based rifles were being developed and brought into service.

After a worldwide arms embargo was enacted against Myanmar after the establishment of the State Peace and Development Council in the 1980s, they turned to Chinese assistance to improve its technological base. The SPDC has received covert assistance from Singapore while working with Israeli consultants by providing factory-built equipment to produce small arms. From 1983 to 1991, the country made indigenous APCs due to budgetary reasons, which consist of the BAAC-83 APC, BAAC-84 SC, BAAC-85 SC, BAAC-86 SC, BAAC-87 APC, and BAAC-87 CCC.

Israel assisted Myanmar in developing its indigenous firearms manufacturing capabilities. They previously sold Uzis to the SPDC in 1991, being made locally as the BA94. Serial production of the Galils, known locally as the MA-1, MA-2, and MA-3, started in 2002 after an agreement with IMI. Production was located at Ka Pa Sa No 1 or DI-1, a factory located near Inya Lake.

Ukraine signed an agreement with Myanmar in 2004 under a $US500 million contract to provide 1000 BTR-3Us.

On 30 April 2008, Washington DC place sanctions on DI under Executive Order 13464 (Blocking Property and Prohibiting Certain Transactions Related to Burma).

In 2014, DI has constructed the BTR-3U with spare parts provided by Ukraine. According to the Kharkiv Morozov Machine Building Design Bureau, Deutz-made engines are used in BTR-3Us in Myanma service.

On 2 July 2013, Lt. General Thein Htay was sanctioned under Executive Order 13619 in targeting people closely connected between Myanmar and North Korea by the Department of the Treasury. On 17 December 2013, the Department of the Treasury placed Asia Metal Company Ltd., Soe Min Htike Co. Ltd., and Excellence Mineral Manufacturing Co. Ltd. under Executive Order 13619 because of its connections to North Korea in assisting DI to acquire construction materials to build additional facilities.

In March 2019, Ukrspecexport has signed an agreement with Myanmar to deliver equipment for a production line assembly to assemble the BTR-4U APC and the 2S1U howitzer.

It's reported in November 2019 that the Tatmadaw has plan to market Myanma-made military hardware for overseas sales in an appearance at the Defense & Security (D&S) show in Bangkok, Thailand.

In October 2021, it's reported that a Myanma businessman named U Tun Hlaing is involved in purchasing materials that are needed for military production.

DI was placed under British sanctions due to the 2021 coup as of 2022. On 20 February 2023, the European Union imposed sanctions on DI for enabling the Tatmadaw to carry out violence against civilians.

== Factories ==
The major factories of the DI are as follows:

- Weapons Factory
- Machine Gun Factory
- Tank Ammo Factory
- Heavy Artillery Ammo Factory
- Medium Artillery Ammo Factory
- Small Arms Ammo Factory
- Bombs & Grenades Factory
- Filling Factory
- Propellants Factory
- Explosives Factory
- Brass Factory
- Tungsten Alloy Factory
- Tungsten Carbide Factory

Officially, Myanmar has not disclosed how many factories it has. Estimates suggest that it has less than six prior to 1988 to "more than 20" in 2011 and 25 in 2022.

== Products ==
=== Tanks and armoured vehicles ===
- MA-MMT 40 105 mm Light tank based on 2S1 chassis (Prototype)
- BTR-3U (Assembling 180 units per year)
- BTR-4E (Planned for assembling)
- ML-LBSh
- BAAC-73 IFV/APC (Produced between 1973 and 1989)
- BAAC-83 IFV/APC (Produced between 1983 and 1989)
- BAAC-84 IFV/APC (Produced between 1984 and 1989)
- BAAC-85 IFV/APC (Produced between 1985 and 1989)
- BAAC-86 IFV/APC (Produced between 1986 and 1989)
- BAAC-87 IFV/APC (Produced between 1987 and 1989)
- MAV-1 IFV (Produced between 1987 and 1993.)
- MAV-2 IFV (Two variants: MAV-2 and MAV-2 MK-2. Produced between 1990 and 2000.)
- MAV-3 IFV (Produced between 1990 and 2000.)
- MAV-4 IFV (Produced between 1990 and 2000.)
- ULARV-1 IFV (Three variants. Production started in the late 2000s)
- ULARV-2 IFV (Production started in the late 2000s)
- ULARV-3 IFV/APC (1 prototype)
- Naung Yoe (Humvee version) IFV (Unveiled at the 61st Armed Force Day Parade, 2006)

=== Utility vehicles ===
- Naung Yoe (utility version) Jeep - (Three different variants)
- Innlay Jeep
- DI-Tiger pick up truck
- Mil-truk Heavy Truck (400 units per year)
- 6-ton trucks (400 units per year)

=== Towed artillery ===
- 105 mm Howitzers (production started in 2006 with the help of Singaporean technicians)

=== Self-propelled artillery ===
- 2S1U (Planning to assemble)

=== Multiple-launch rocket systems ===
- MAM-01 (MA-122) - 122 mm rocket artillery system. Two variants. Mass-produced since 2010.
- MAM-02 (MA-240) - 240 mm rocket artillery system. Based on North Korea's M-1991 240 mm rocket artillery system.

=== Mortars ===
- 2-inch(50.8 mm) light mortar : Copy produced mortars based on British Two-inch mortar.Produced between 1950s and 1960s.Substituted with BA-series motars in 1990s.
- 3-inch(81 mm) mortar : Copy produced mortars based on British ML 3-inch mortar.Produced between 1950s and 1960s.Substituted with BA-series motars in 1990s.
- BA-90 81 mm mortar(400 units per year) : Production started in late 1980s.Now the production was stopped and the production was substituted with MA-8.
- BA-97 (MA-6 MK-II) 120 mm mortar(50 units per year) : Production started in late 1980s. Produced as the BA-97 mortar to early 1990s. Name changed to MA-6 MK-II in the late 1990s. The only BA-series mortar still in production.
- BA-100 60 mm commando mortar (400 units per year) : Production started in the late 1980s. No longer produced. Substituted with MA-9.
- MA-6 120 mm extended range mortar (50 units per year) : Production started in the late 1990s.
- MA-7 60 mm extended range mortar (400 units per year) : Production started in the late 1990s.
- MA-8 81 mm extended range mortar (400 units per year) : Production started in the late 1990s.
- MA-9 60 mm commando mortar(400 units per year) : Production started in the late 1990s.

=== Air defence ===
- MADV : Self-propelled short-range air defence system. Igla turret with 4 SA-16 missiles and a 14.5 mm AA gun fitted on a Naung Yoe. 180 units had been produced as of 2013.
- KS-1M : Medium air defence system. Licensed production of HQ-12. Two GYD-1B surface-to-air missiles are fitted on the locally made Mil-truk. Production began in 2015 and one battery of KS-1M air defence system was unveiled at the 71st Armed Force Day Parade (2016).

=== Missiles ===
- SA-16 : Very short range man portable air defence system. Licensed production since 2004. According to Arms Trade RTF by Stockholm International Peace Research Institute, 1000 SA-16s had been produced as of 2014.
- GYD-1B (KS-1M) : Medium range surface-to-air missile. Based on the technology of HQ-12 missile. For locally made KS-1M medium range air defence systems. It is a little bit faster than KS-1A surface-to-air missile. The maximum range is between 50 and 75 km.
- Hwasong-5 : Short range tactical ballistic missile based on R-17 Elbrus (Scud-B). In 2008, North Korea transferred Hwasong-5 (Scud-B) missile technology to Myanmar. In December 2006, South Korean press reported that Daewoo signed a deal with the Myanmar government in May 2002 to build an arms factory near Pyay, worth US$133.8 million. Some analysts believed that this deal included the supply of some parts for missile development in Myanmar. In 2014, China told UN monitors that North Korean-made ballistic missiles and missile-related alloy rods destined for Myanmar had been found on a ship docked in China.

=== Small arms ===
- BA-52 : 9 mm machine gun. Produced with the Italian technical assistance. Design similar to TZ-45. Also known as Ne Win Sten. Production started between 1952 and 1953.
- BA-63 : 7.62 mm battle rifle. Licensed production of Heckler & Koch G3. 63 refers to production started year, 1963.
- BA-64 : 7.62 mm light machine gun. Licensed production of Heckler & Koch G3. 64 refers to production started year, 1964.
- BA-72 : 7.62 mm assault rifle. Licensed production of Heckler & Koch G3. 72 refers to production started year, 1972.
- BA-93 (Grenade launcher) : Rifle grenade launcher. 93 refers to production started year, 1993.
- BA-93 (submachine gun) : 9 mm submachine gun. Licensed production of Uzi. Early version of BA-94 (MA-13) with wooden stock. 93 refers to production started year, 1993.
- BA-94 (MA-13) : 9 mm submachine gun. Upgraded variant of BA-93 (machine gun). 94 refers to production started year, 1994. The name was changed as MA-13.
- MA-1 MK-I : 5.56 mm assault rifle. Licensed production of IMI Galil.
- MA-1 MK-II : Upgraded version of MA-1 MK-I with own design.
- MA-1 MK-III : 5.56 mm assault bullpup rifle. Unlicensed production of QBZ-95/97.
- MA-2 MK-I : 5.56 mm light machine gun. Licensed production of IMI Galil.
- MA-2 MK-II : Upgraded version of MA-2 MK-I with own design.
- MA-2 MK-III : 5.56 mm bullpup light machine gun. Licensed production of QBZ-95/97.
- MA-3 MK-I : 5.56 mm Submachine gun. Licensed production of IMI Galil.
- MA-3 MK-II : Upgraded version of MA-3 MK-I with own design.
- MA-3 MK-III : 5.56 mm bullpup Submachine gun. Licensed production of QBZ-95/97.
- MA-4 MK-I : 5.56 mm assault rifle with grenade launcher. Licensed production of IMI Galil.
- MA-4 MK-II : Upgraded version of MA-4 MK-I with own design.
- MA-4 MK-III : 5.56 mm assault bullpup rifle with grenade launcher. Licensed production of QBZ-95/97.
- MA-5 MK-II : 9 mm Semi-automatic pistol. Copy of Glock.
- MA-11 5.56 mm assault rifle. Licensed production of Heckler & Koch HK33.
- MA-12 : 5.56 mm light machine gun. Licensed production of Heckler & Koch HK33.
- MA-13 MK-II : 9 mm submachine gun. Copy of Steyr TMP.
- MA-15 : 7.62 mm general purpose machine gun. Licensed production of MG 3 machine gun
- MA-16 : .50-inch heavy machine gun. Licensed production of STK 50MG.
- MAS-1 MK-I : 7.62 mm Designated marksman rifle. Production started in 2010. Copy of Zastava M76.
- MAS-1 MK-II : 7.62 mm Designated marksman rifle. Production started in 2012. Copy of Zastava M91.
- MAS-2 : .50inch Anti-materiel sniper rifle.

=== Anti-aircraft guns ===
- MAA-01 : 35 mm AA guns. Production of Oerlikon GDF with the Chinese technology assistance.
- 25 mm self-propelled twin anti-aircraft guns : Two locally made 25 mm AA guns which are fitted on the locally made Mil-truk.
- 14.5 mm QJG-02G AA guns : Licensed production. 50 units per year.
- 12.7 mm heavy machine guns (200 units per year)
- Various kinds of Remote controlled weapon stations for ULARV-series armoured vehicles.
- Type-91 14.5 mm quad AA guns (only for the navy)
- 14.5 mm DI Remote controlled weapon stations. (only for the navy)

=== Anti-tank weapons ===
- MA-10 RPG : Copy of RPG-7. Producing 1,500 units per year.
- MA-14 recoilless rifle : Copy of Chinese 82mm Type 78 recoilless rifle.
- BA-84 (MA-84) MK-I and MK-II recoilless rifles : Copies of Carl Gustaf 8.4cm recoilless rifle M2 and M3 (2014) MAAWS variants.

=== Land mines ===
- MM-1 mine
- MM-2 mine
- Unlicensed production of M14 mine
- Anti-tank mine (Copy of Chinese Type-59 Anti-tank mine)
- Bounding Anti-personal mine (Copy of US M16 mine)
- MM-5 mine (copy of Claymore mine)

=== Ammunition and bombs ===
- small arms ammunition (60 million units per year)
- MG-1 hand grenades
- MG-2 40 mm rifle grenades (HEDP) for MA-4 MK-I, II, III rifles.
- MG-3 40 mm launcher grenades (HE).
- MG-4 40 mm launcher grenades (HEDP).
- AZDM 111 A 1/2 Fuze.
- MR-1 73 mm Anti-personnel rocket propelled grenades (HE) for MA-10.
- MR-2 75 mm Anti-personnel rocket propelled grenades (HE) for MA-10.
- 122 mm and 240 mm rockets for MAM-01 and MAM-02.
- 120/81/60 mm mortar bombs for BA-series and MA-series mortars.
- 155/130/122/105/76 mm ammunition for towed guns.
- 57/77/122 mm rockets and up to 500 kg dumb bombs for the air force.
- 14.5/12.7/25/37/40/57/76 mm ammunition for the navy.

=== Others ===
- Various kinds of scope for rifles and sniper rifles.
- Telescopic sights for MA-10.
- DI fire trucks(one of the variants of Mil-truk).
- DI water/fuel tanker trucks(one of the variants of Mil-truk).
- DI Mobile hospital truck
- DI Mobile kitchen
- DI Bridge layer

== Known heads of DDI ==
- Lieutenant General Thein Htay
- Lieutenant General Kan Myint Than

== Bibliography ==
- Jones, Richard D. (2009). Jane's Infantry Weapons 2009/2010. Jane's Information Group. ISBN 978-0-7106-2869-5.
- Maung, Aung Myoe (2009). Building the Tatmadaw: Myanmar Armed Forces Since 1948. Institute of Southeast Asian Studies. ISBN 978-981-230-848-1.
