= Ford GTB =

US military truck

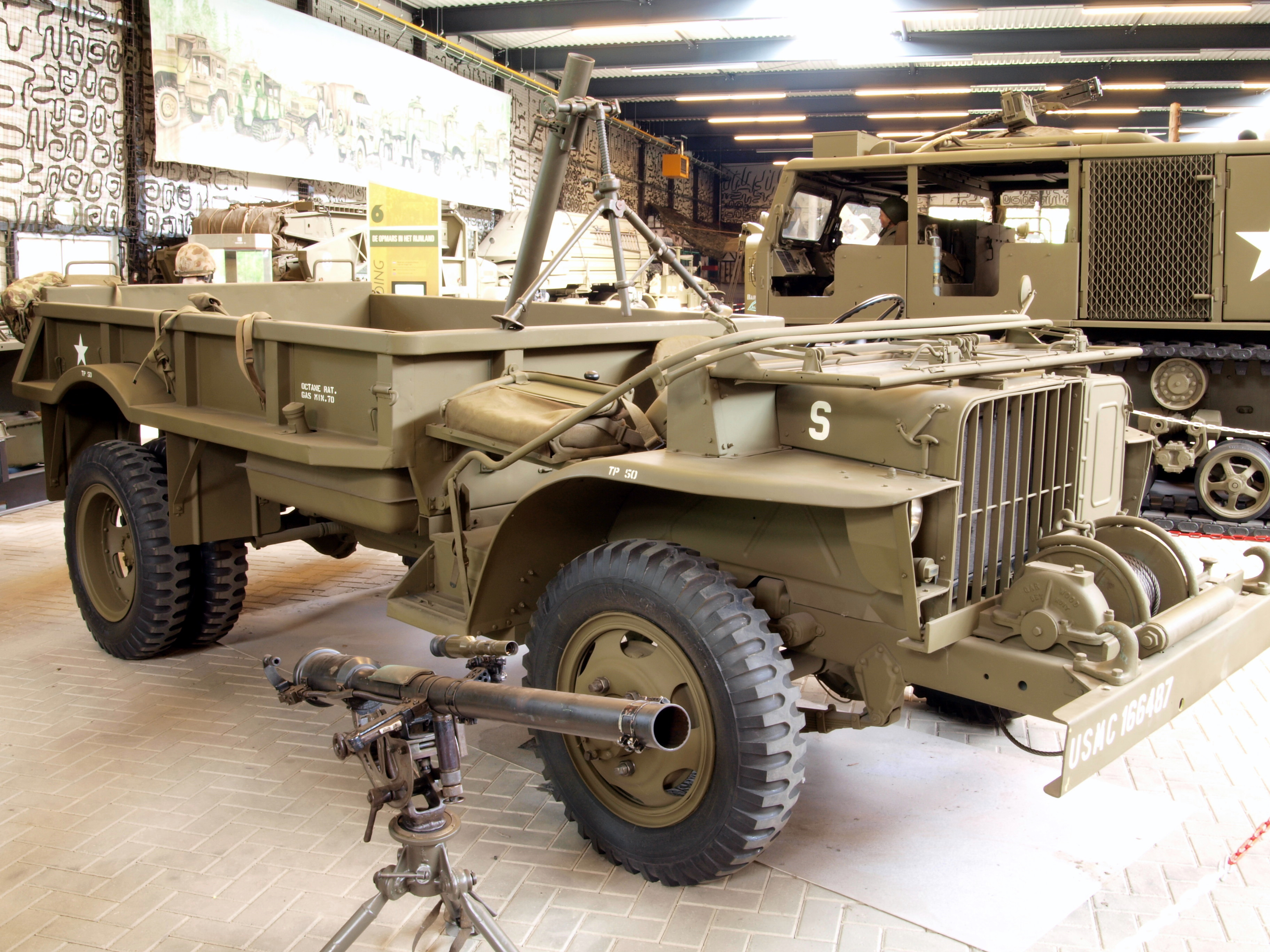
- G-622 Ford GTB, Cargo, Low Silhouette, USMC #166487
- Type: Low-profile 1 1/2-ton truck
- Place of origin: United States

Service history
- Used by: United States Army; United States Navy; United States Marine Corps
- Wars: Second World War; Korean War

Production history
- Designer: Ford Motor Company
- Manufacturer: Ford Motor Company
- Produced: 1942–1944
- No. built: 15,274
- Variants: Cargo, bomb service & wrecker

Specifications (GTB)
- Mass: 6,900 lb (3.1 t) curb weight 10,250 lb (4.65 t) GVW
- Length: 15 ft (4.57 m) overall 9 ft 7 in (2.92 m) wheelbase
- Width: 7 ft 2 in (2.18 m)
- Height: 8 ft 4 in (2.54 m) with canvas cover 6 ft 8 in (2.03 m) minimum
- Engine: 226 cu in (3,703 cc) IL6; Ford G8T petrol 90 hp (67.1 kW) at 3,300 rpm
- Payload capacity: 1 1/2 short tons (1.4 t)
- Drive: 4x4
- Transmission: 4-forward, 1-reverse manual 2-speed transfer case
- Suspension: Semi-elliptical leaf springs
- Fuel capacity: 40 US gal (150 L)
- Operational range: 440 mi (710 km)
- Maximum speed: 45 mph (72 km/h)
- References: Berndt, Doyle & Ware

The Ford GTB, commonly called the Burma Jeep, was a 1 1/2-ton 4x4 truck produced during WWII by Ford and was used primarily by the United States military, primarily the US Navy and Marine Corps. The GTB was used primarily in the Pacific Theater during World War II, with many being used on the "Burma Road".

GTBs remained in service after WW II. Some were used during the Korean War (1950–1953). The last units were retired from service as late as 1967.

The GTB's Ordnance Standard nomenclature number was G-622.

== Variants ==
Ford produced over 15,000 of these low silhouette, short, and maneuverable GTB's in five models, with all except the GTBS having dual rear wheels:

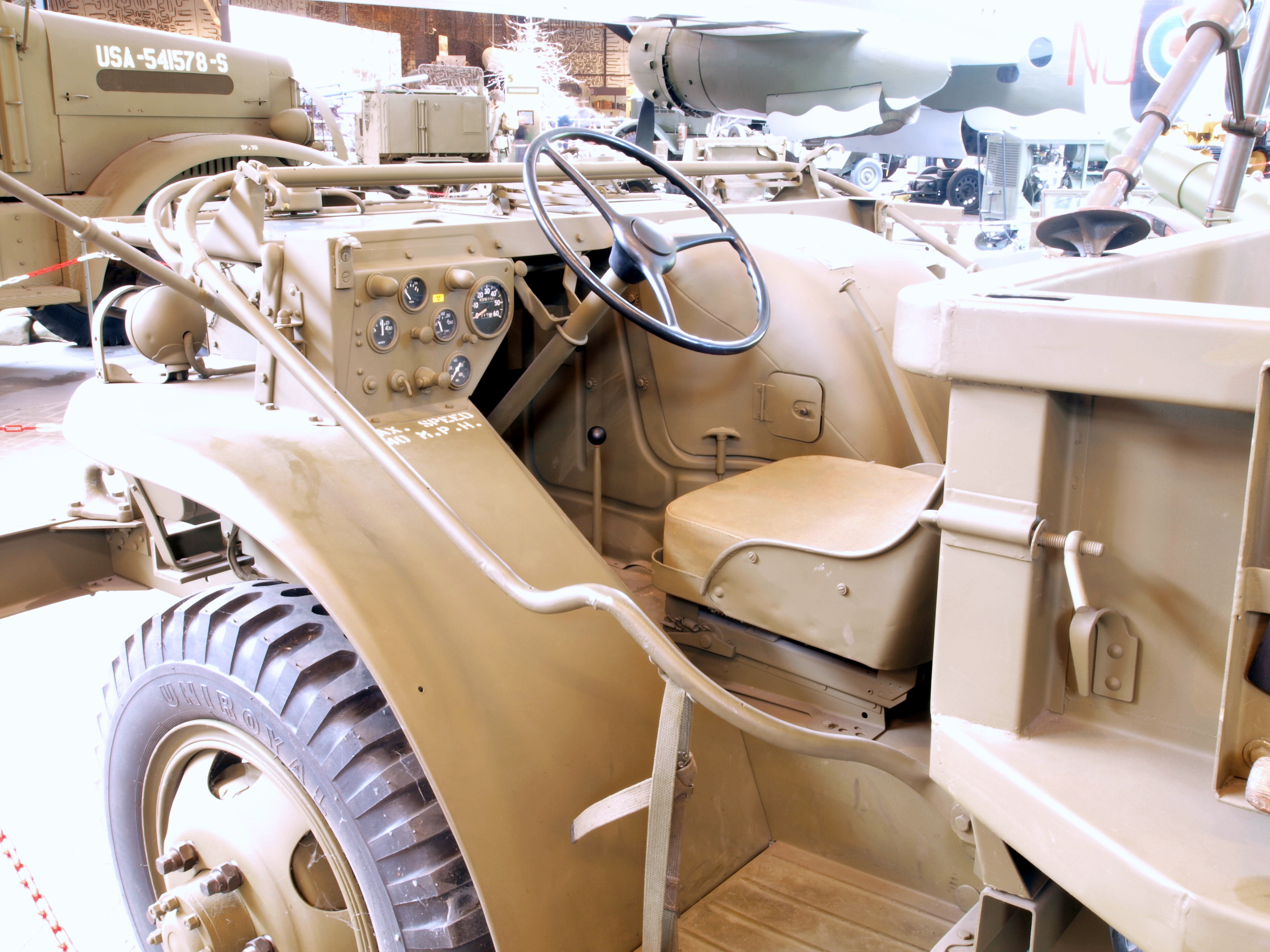
Cab of Ford GTB, Cargo, Low Silhouette

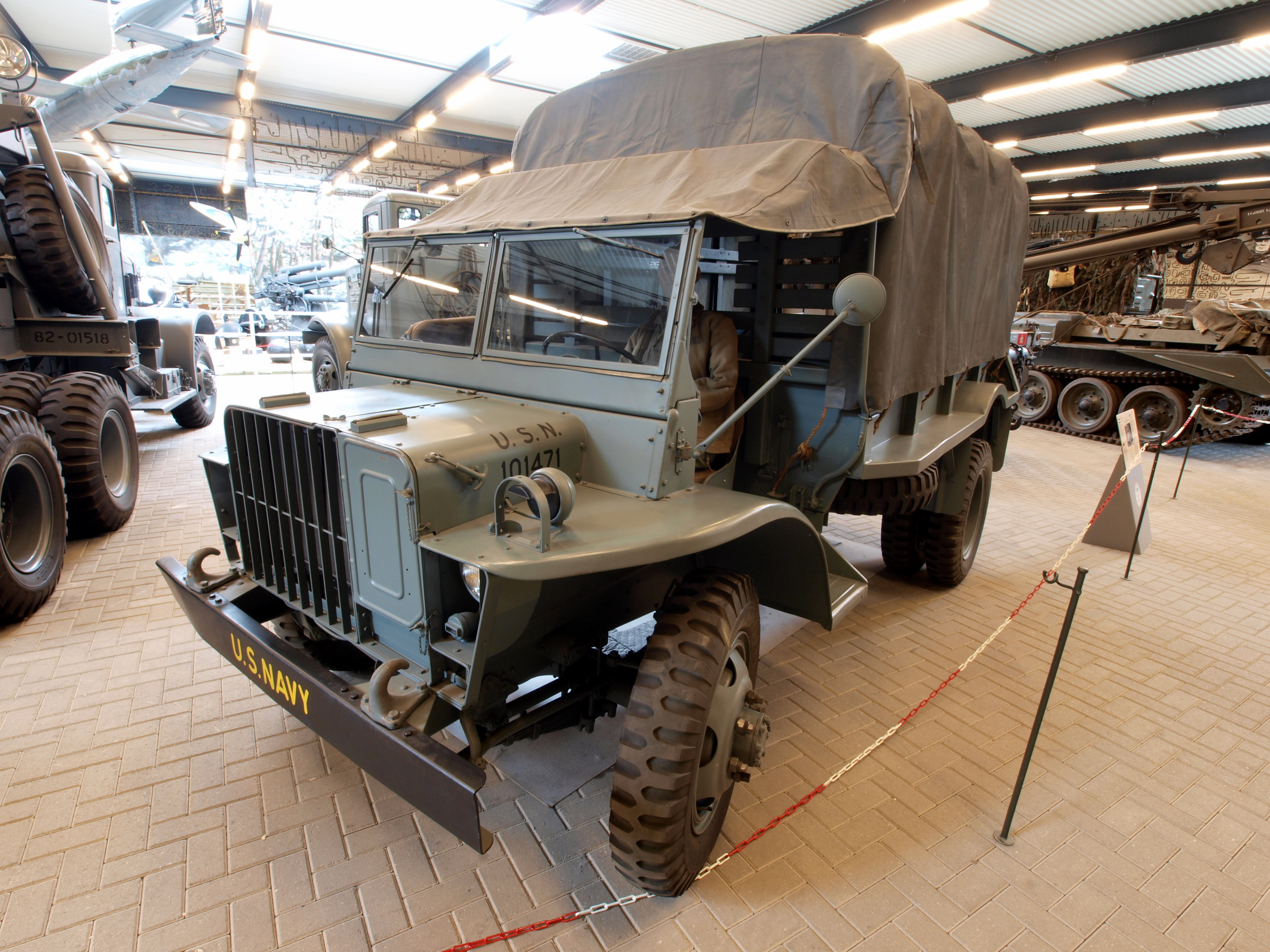
Ford GTB Low Silhouette Cargo U.S.N. #101471

- GTB truck, Cargo, the basic version with a troop/cargo carrying bed equipped with side mounted folding bench seats,
- GTBA truck, (US Navy) All navy versions were produced in "Ocean Grey"
- GTBB truck, Wrecker, (Rare, only 50 produced)
- GTBS truck, Bomb Service with crane (US Navy)
- GTBC truck, Bomb Service with crane (USN, improved)

== Operators ==
United States

- Military of the United States
  - United States Navy
  - United States Marine Corps

Chile (U.S. shipping to protect mining ports)

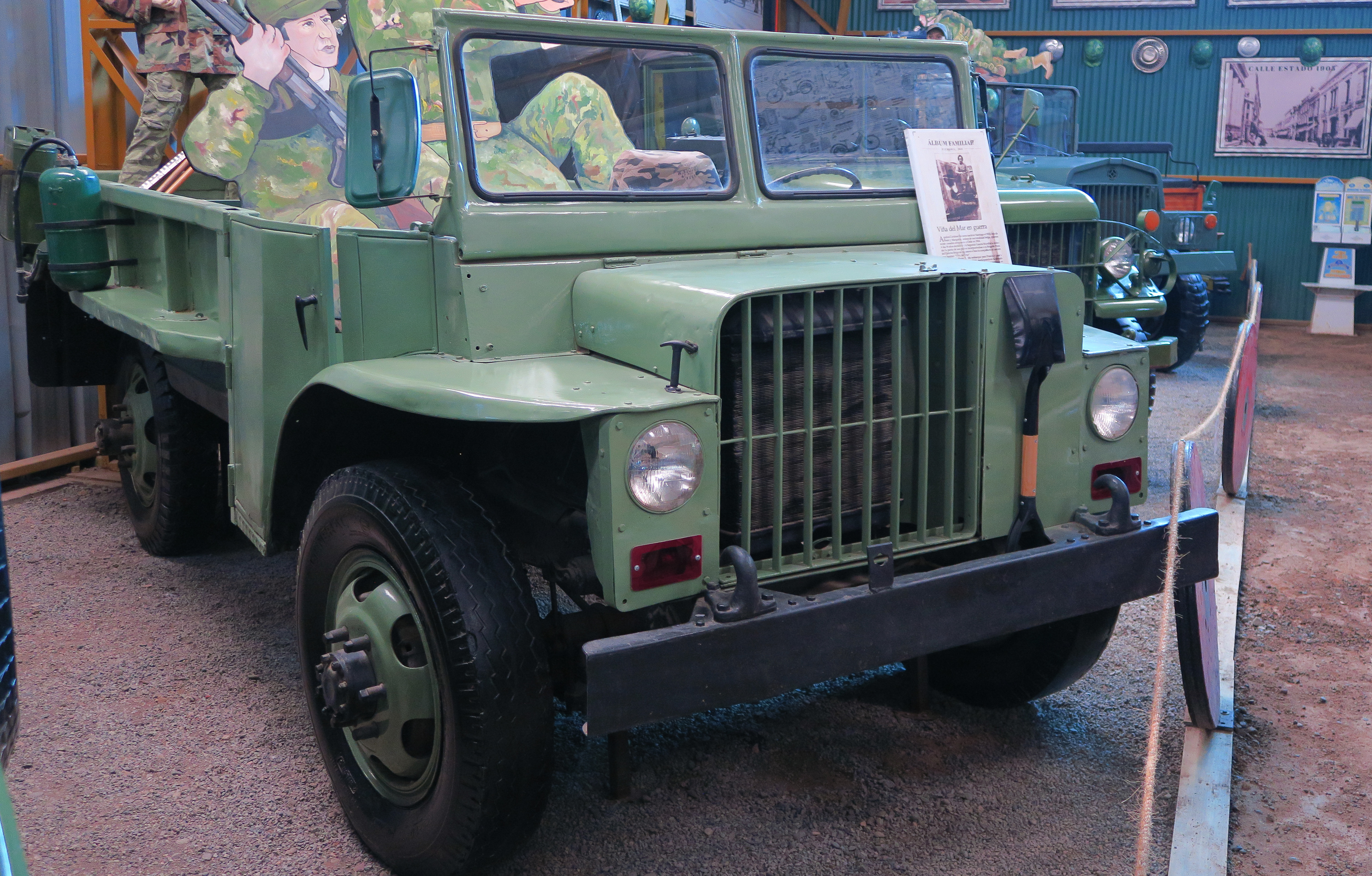
Ford GTB (Chile)

== See also ==
- Jeffery Quad - a similar but much older vehicle
- Mazda Pathfinder XV-1, commonly called the Mazda Jeep or the Burmese Jeep, is a 4x4 Mazda built from 1970 to 1973 in an assembly plant in Myanmar strictly for Myanmar market.

== General references ==
- TM 10-1435 Maintenance Manual for Ford GTB (G622) 1 1/2-ton 4×4 truck, 20 August 1942 edition. 181 pages.
- TM 10-1434 Illustrated Parts for Ford 1 1/2-ton 4×4 truck, July 1942
