= EMER-K1 =

Burmese bullpup assault rifle

- Type: Bullpup assault rifle; Bullpup light machine gun
- Place of origin: Myanmar

Service history
- In service: 1998-?
- Used by: Tatmadaw (primary user)

Production history
- Designer: Electrical Mechanical and Engineering Corps (EMEC)
- Designed: 1995
- Manufacturer: Electrical Mechanical and Engineering Corps (EMEC)
- Produced: 1995
- No. built: Preproduction prototypes only

Specifications
- Mass: 4 kg (8.8 lb) (no magazine, assault rifle); 4.5 kg (9.9 lb) (light machine gun)
- Cartridge: 5.56×45mm NATO
- Action: Gas-operated, closed bolt
- Rate of fire: 650 rounds/minute
- Effective firing range: 400 m (440 yd)
- Feed system: 30-round detachable STANAG box magazine
- Sights: Post front sight and adjustable rear sights

The EMER K-1, sometimes known as the EMER K1 or EMERK-1, was a prototype bullpup assault rifle made in Myanmar by the Electrical Mechanical and Engineering Corps (EMEC). Reverse engineered in 1995 from the Chinese QBZ-97 assault rifle, the EMER K-1 was prone to stoppage.

== History ==
The EMER K-1's development started after Ng Chung-Keung, a subsidiary of Chinese defense contractor Norinco, exported a batch of QBZ-97 assault rifles to Myanmar. Norinco decided not to export any more QBZ-97s due to arms sanctions placed on the country. Myanmar, in response, refused to return them and subsequently were used as the basis for reverse engineering studies.

It was designed by EMEC engineers in 1995 with a batch of 15-16 firearms made for testing and evaluation.

Some EMER-K1s were issued to elite Myanmar troops on guard duty at the Yadana gas field, according to Yangon-based diplomats in 1998.

The EMER-K1 was not adopted by the Tatmadaw due to various problems on reliability and multiple incidents of stoppages and gun jams. The QBZ-97 was reexamined in order to reverse engineer it once again. This time, the decision was made to use the QBZ-97 as the basis for the MA-1 MK III assault rifle family.

== Design ==
Reports suggested that the development of the EMER-K1 was made possible due to technical assistance from Singapore, in violation of United Nations arms sanctions. This was also made possible due to machinery allegedly supplied by Singapore.

Construction of the EMER-K1s were done via stamping with all-metal bodies. The design was based on other assault rifles like the SAR21, SA80, M16, IMI Tavor and the Steyr AUG.

The EMER-K1's flash hider, carry handle, magazine housing, bayonet stud, sling swivels and flip aperture sights are based on the M16 series. The pistol grip, trigger, trigger guard, stock and vent holes are based on the SA80 series.

The rifle’s action appears to be based on the QBZ-95's gas piston. The fire selector has three settings and is positioned on the left side behind the magazine well with the charging handle position on the right side.

== Variants ==
=== EMER-K1 Assault Rifle ===
The basic version of the EMER-K1. It, like the LMG version, are 832mm in length with effective range and firing rate as 400m and 650 rounds per minute. Its weight is 4 kg.

=== EMER-K1 LMG ===
An LMG version of the EMER-K1. The barrel appears to be an AKM-based muzzle-climb compensator while having a different handguard. It is 500g heavier at 4.5kg with no magazine.

== Bibliography ==
- Johnson, Gary Paul; Nelson, Thomas B. (2016-12-15). The World's Assault Rifles. Ironside International Publishers. ISBN 9781619846012.
- Thompson, Leroy (2019-05-30). The G3 Battle Rifle. Weapon 68. Osprey Publishing. ISBN 9781472828620.
