= Type 84 =

Chinese armored recovery vehicle

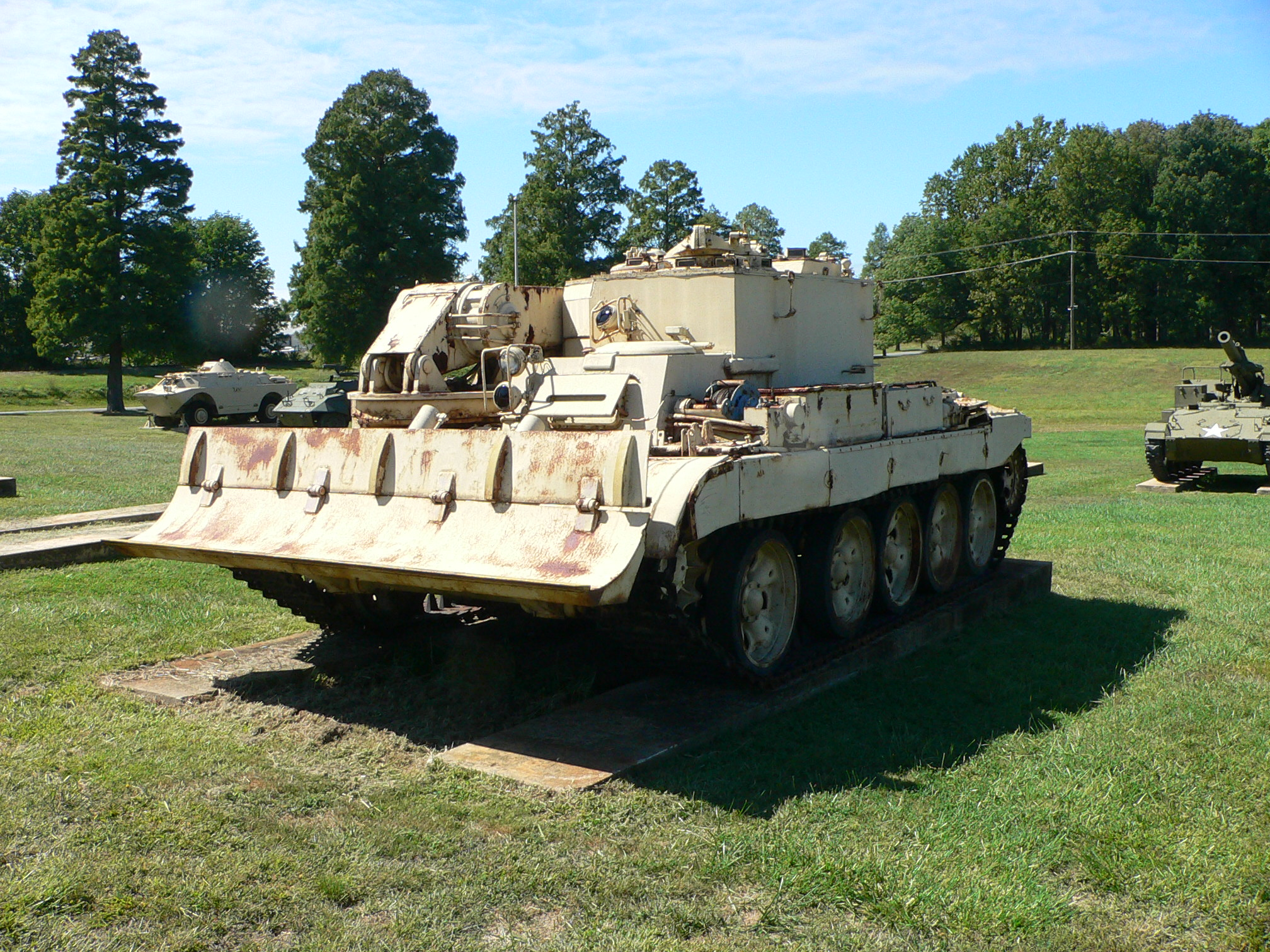
Type 653 ARV.

The Type 84 is an armoured recovery vehicle based on the Type 79 tank, entering service with the PLA Army in 1984. The Type 84 features a powered structure controlling a dozer blade at the front of the hull and a hydraulically powered crane. The crane is capable of lifting up to 70 tons.

The previous variant based on the Type 69 was designated as Type 653.

== Users ==
- Bangladesh:20
- China
- Kurdistan
- Myanmar:18
- Pakistan
- Tanzania:5 Type-84A delivered in 2014
- Thailand
- Iraq: User of Type-653

== See also ==
- WZT

== Sources ==
- International Institute for Strategic Studies (February 2016). The Military Balance 2016. Vol. 116. Routledge. ISBN 978-1-85743-835-2.
