= Dongfeng EQ2102 =

Medium-duty commercial vehicle

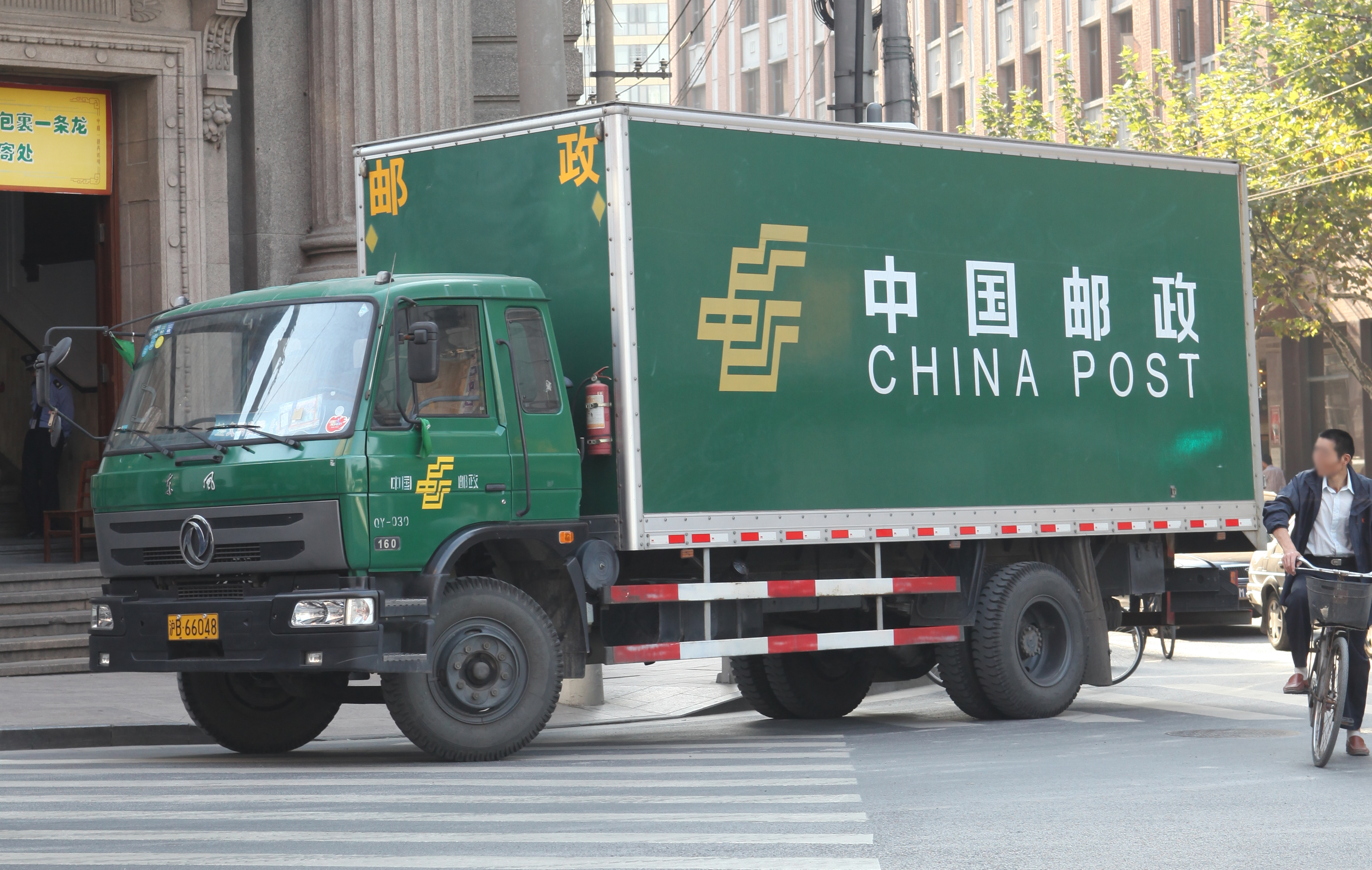

Overview
- Manufacturer: Dongfeng Motor Corporation
- Also called: Dongfeng 145; Dongfeng 160
- Production: 1990–present

Body and chassis
- Class: Truck
- Body style: Truck (standard cab)
- Related: Nissan Diesel Condor CM series

Dimensions
- Wheelbase: 3,475 mm (136.8 in)/1,250 mm (49.2 in)
- Length: 7,495 mm (295.1 in)
- Width: 2,470 mm (97.2 in)
- Height: 3,240 mm (127.6 in) (with canvas and bow kit)
- Curb weight: 6,920 kg (without winch); 7,120 (with winch)

The Dongfeng EQ2102 is a 3.5 tonne capacity troop/cargo carrier truck developed and built by Dongfeng Motor Corporation and used by the People's Liberation Army of the People's Republic of China for transport. The truck is based on the Nissan Diesel Condor CM series via the joint venture between Dongfeng and Nissan.

When in civilian use, this series of trucks uses a variety of different names (from EQ1101 to EQ5108 depending on the version) but is usually referred to as the Dongfeng 145. A facelifted version is called the "160".

It entered service in the 1990s to replace the aging CA-30 and the EQ245/EQ2100.

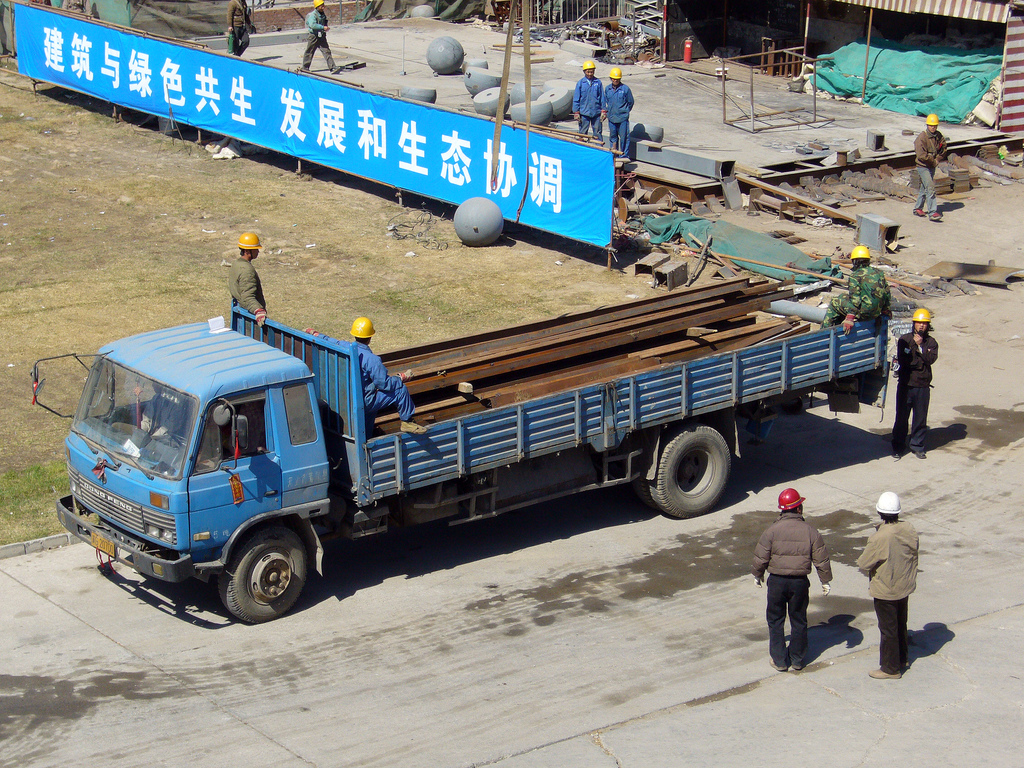
Dongfeng 145, civilian version

== Specifications ==
- Seating: 1+4 (EQ2102); or 1+2 (EQ2102G)
- Configuration: 6X6
- Weight (empty): 6,920 kg (without winch); 7,120 (with winch)
- Load: 5,000 kg (road); 3,500 kg (cross-country)
- Towed load: 4,800 kg
- Length: 7,495mm
- Width: 2.470mm
- Height: 3.240m (with canvas and bow kit)
- Wheelbase: 3,475mm / 1,250mm
- Track (front/rear): 1,876mm / 1,870mm
- Ground clearance: 305mm
- Max speed: 90 km/h

== Variants ==
- 1+4 (EQ2102)
- 1+2 (EQ2102G)
