= Innlay Tactical Jeep =

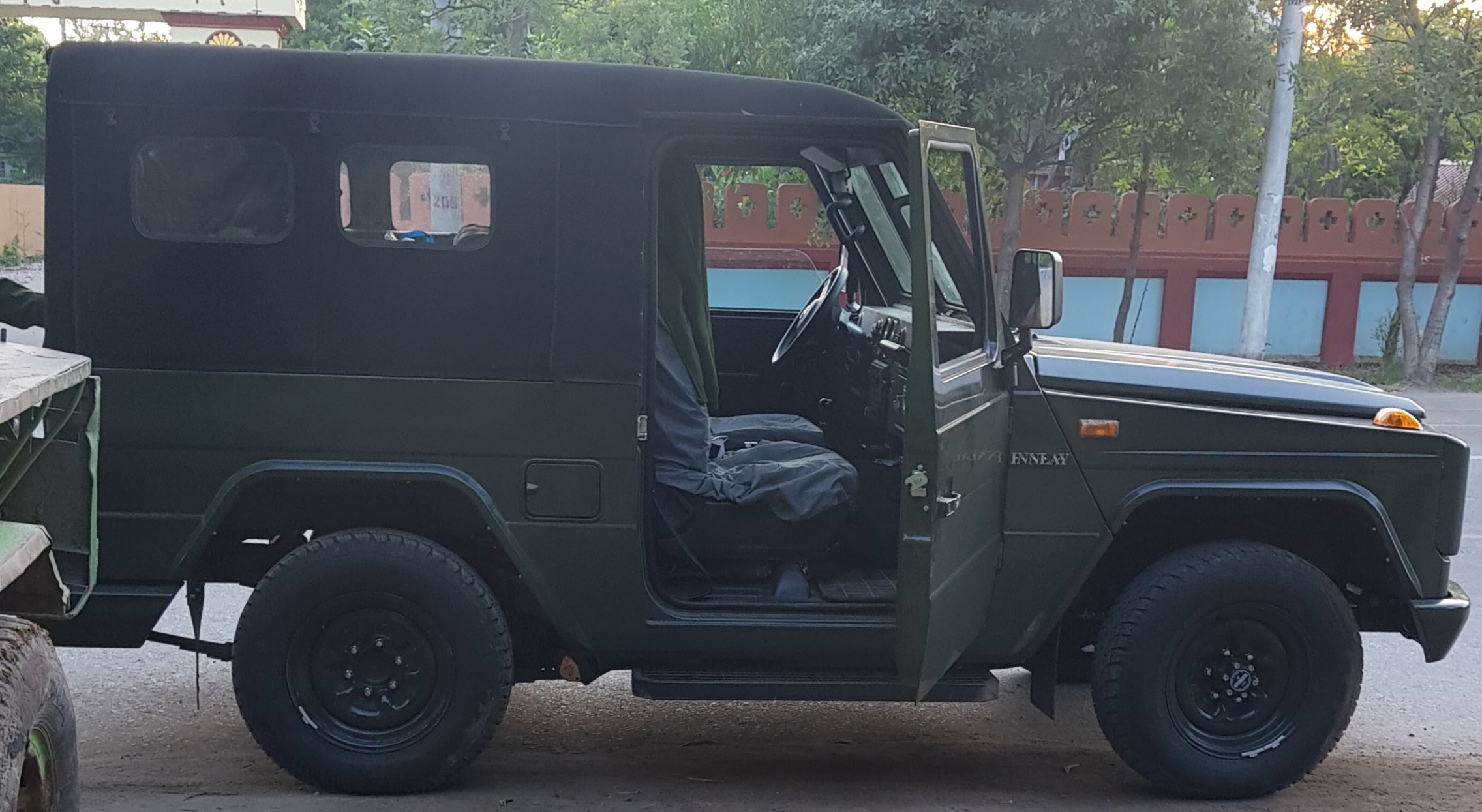

Overview
- Type: 4x4 utility truck
- Manufacturer: Tatmadaw Heavy Industry
- Production: 2016-present

Body and chassis
- Body style: 3-door station wagon
- Layout: Front-engine, four-wheel-drive
- Related: Zhongxing Admiral

Powertrain
- Engine: 3.2L Dongfeng Chaochai CYQD80-E4
- Transmission: 5-speed manual

The Innlay Tactical Jeep, commonly called the Innlay Jeep (Burmese: အင်းလေးဂျစ်), is a 4x4 off-road vehicle designed and manufactured by Tatmadaw Heavy Industry. Currently, the production capacity is 200 units annually. Later will increase to 1000 units per annual.

The Innlay Jeeps are only issued to Tatmadaw, Myanmar Police Force and Myanmar Fire Force.

== History ==
In 2016, Tatmadaw took over automobile industries from Ministry of Industry (Myanmar). Those factories were halted operations due to various reasons by government before transfer to Tatmadaw.

The axles for Innlay are produced from Tatmadaw Heavy Industry (Myingyan) and gearboxes are from Tatmadaw Heavy Industry (Magway). The final assembly is done by Tatmadaw Heavy Industry (Htonbo). Htonbo factory assembled Mazda Pathfinder XV-1 since 1970.

The engine looks like DCD Engine (CY 499 Ti) produced from No (14) Heavy Industry (Thagaya) under Ministry of Industry (Myanmar). But the factory was suspended its operation in 2017 due to financial losses. So the Tatmadaw imported engines from China. The imported engine is Dongfeng CYQD80-E4 which is in turn a copy of Nissan QD32. This vehicle is based upon ZX Admiral pickup trucks.

== Variants ==
The Innlay is manufactured in a short wheelbase version with a canvas roof and a pair of large folding benches in the rear. This variant is mainly issued to high-ranking officers.

A Type 63 multiple rocket launcher mounted variant and rocket pod mounted variant were seen at the 76th Anniversary Armed Forces Day parade.
