= DI MA-1 =

2002 assault rifle made in Myanmar

MA-1
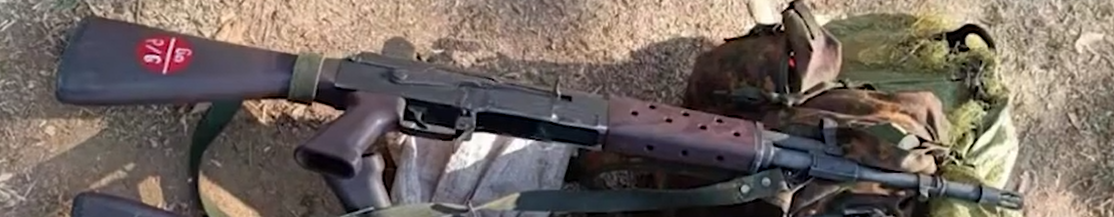
- A MA-1 assault rifle captured by TNLA fighters in Kyaukme.
- Type: Assault rifle; Light machine gun; Designated marksman rifle
- Place of origin: Myanmar

Service history
- In service: 2002–present
- Used by: See Users
- Wars: Ethnic conflicts in Myanmar; Myanmar civil war

Production history
- Designer: Yisrael Galili of Israel Military Industries (Note: Minor adaptions were made to the original Israeli Galil design.)
- Designed: 1991
- Manufacturer: Ka Pa Sa No. 1 Myanmar Fritz Werner Industries (Note: Some sources mention this company is responsible for manufacturing the MA rifles.)
- Produced: 2002–present
- Variants: See Variants

Specifications
- Mass: 4 kg (9 lb) (No Magazine, Mk. I-II); 4.42 kg (10 lb) (No Magazine, Mk. II); 4.66 kg (10 lb) (With Magazine, Mk. I-II)
- Length: 978 mm (39 in) (Mk. I-II); 1,065 mm (42 in) (Mk. I-II); 508 mm (20 in) (Barrel Length, Mk. II)
- Cartridge: 5.56×45mm NATO
- Action: Gas-operated, rotating bolt
- Rate of fire: 950 rounds/min (Mk. I-II); 600-700 rounds/min (Mk. II)
- Muzzle velocity: 950 m/s (3,120 ft/s)
- Effective firing range: 400 m (437 yd)
- Feed system: 35-, 50-, or 65-round box magazine (Galil-based); 30-round magazine (For Mk. II variants c. 2019); 70 or 100-round drum magazine (MA-2); 10-round magazine (MA-S Mk. I); 20-round magazine (MA-S Mk. II)
- Sights: Iron sights; Scopes (MAS)

The DI MA-1 (Note: Sometimes known as the MA1.) is a family of Burmese-made assault rifles chambered for 5.56×45mm NATO, produced by the Myanmar Directorate of Defence Industries.

The MA designation on the weapon means Myanmar Army. The series are sometimes erroneously referred to as the EMERK-3.

== History ==
The Tatmadaw were initially armed with the BA63 (Burma Army 63), the Myanmar-made version of the Heckler & Koch G3A3 battle rifle made under license agreement with West Germany under the Ka Pa Sa factories in partnership with Fritz Werner Industry Ausrustungen-Gmbh (FRG) and the German Technical Corporation Agency. However, it was considered too heavy for Burmese soldiers to use in jungle warfare.

A team of engineers from IMI reportedly visited Yangon in 1991, helping with preparing the foundation to manufacture the MA-1s. Reports cite Israel's support of Myanmar in developing the MA-1 despite repeated denials by Israeli officials based in Myanmar, Singapore and Thailand.

Serial production started in 2002 after signing an agreement with IMI. The assault rifles were mostly made at Ka Pa Sa No 1 or DI-1, a factory located near Inya Lake that serves as the main factory.

According to William Ashton, Israel sought Myanmar out in order to gain international allies due to the constant threat of being surrounded by hostile states in the Middle East.

=== Operational use ===
The MA-series was first spotted in the early 2000s at numerous Tatmadaw Armed Forces Day parades and demonstrations, replacing the previous Heckler & Koch G3 rifles that were in service.

By 2009, it was reported that the Tatmadaw was almost fully equipped with the MA series. From 2014, the Mk II variant is being used by the Tatmadaw as their standard rifle. Plans were made to fully adopt the DI MA-1 Mk. III, but plans are halted due to quality issues.

MA rifles have also been seen usage by the insurgent groups, captured from Tatmadaw forces or from defecting soldiers.

MA-1 and MA-3s have been documented in use by the PDF in the civil war since May 2023, with most being captures from Myanmar government soldiers and police officers.

Some MA-3s were reportedly seen in Manipur, where they were confiscated in raids in July 2024.

== Design ==
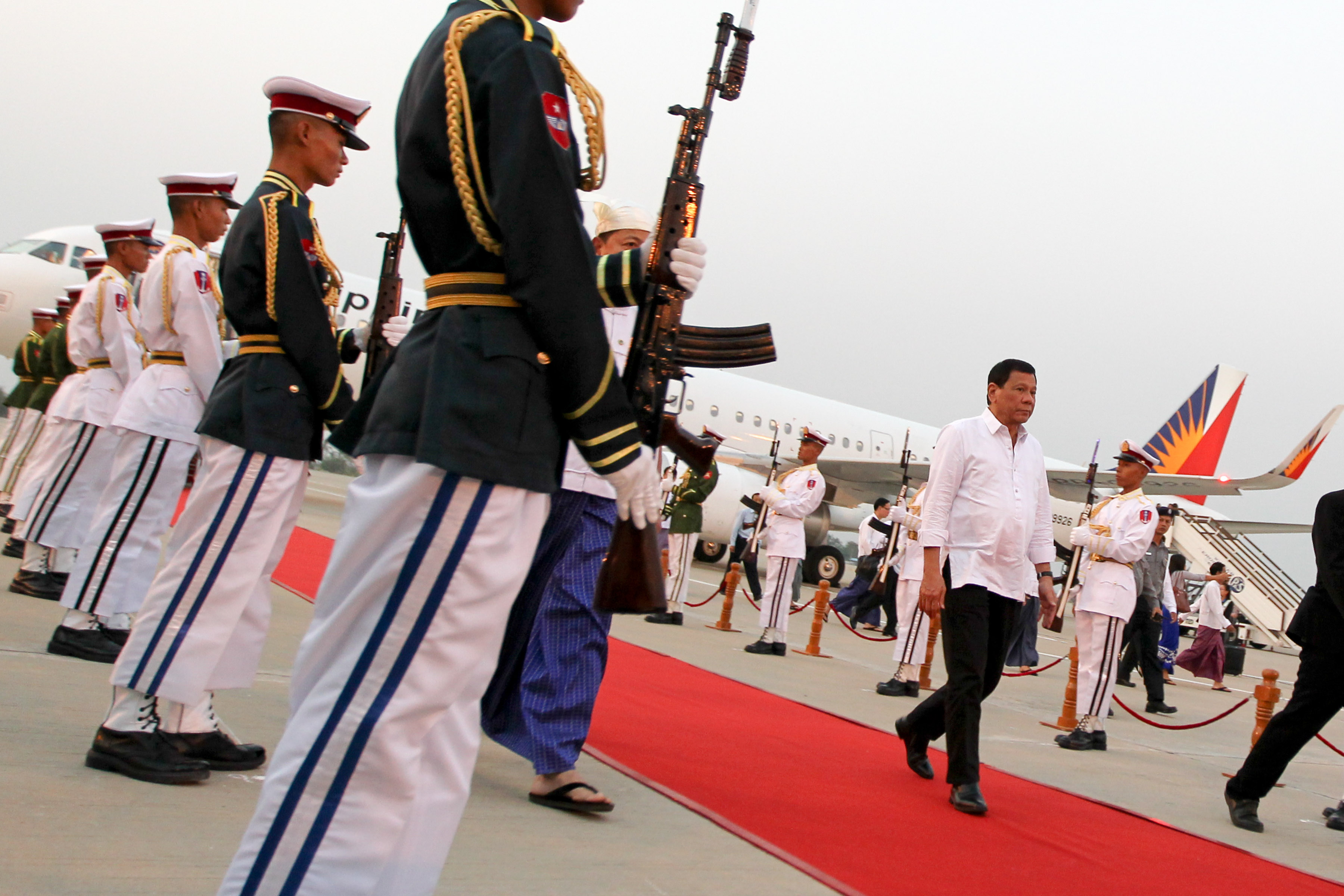
Tatmadaw soldiers in an honor guard holding MA-1s in a rifle salute.

The DI MA-1 series are based on the IMI Galil with some localised modifications produced with assistance from Israel.

The MA-1 rifles are made with ventilated handguards and horizontal charging handles, unlike the Galil which has a vertical charging handle. Early models (Mk. I) have curved cheekpieces in the buttstocks with later models (Mk. II) omitting this. MA rifles are compatible with Galil magazines, although they can use polymer magazines.

They were initially introduced with wooden handguards; early models were made with brown polymer furniture and rounded, smooth pistol grips. Later versions were produced with black furniture and clear cut Galil grips, designated as the Mk II. It also uses synthetic alloys and plastics in its construction.

An indicator for a MA rifle that is optimized to fire rifle grenades is the presence of tall iron sights. The rifles can use the MG-2 rifle grenade.

The selectors consist of safe, semi-auto and full-auto mode.

In a 2009 interview, Sai Sheng Murng, deputy spokesman of the Shan State Army (RCSS), mentioned that foreign-made 5.56 NATO ammo cannot be used in the MA rifles while Myanmar-made ammo can work with foreign assault rifles chambered in the same caliber.

== Variants ==
=== MA-1 ===
Standard assault rifle with a bayonet lug for the option to have a bayonet mounted. The bipod was not made standard with the MA-1s with the cleaning kit stored in a hollow space in the buttstock. The MA-1s are not equipped with a pistol grip-type safety system.

It is reported by convicted porters under the Tatmadaw that Myanma soldiers would write the battalion number on its stock.

=== MA-2 ===
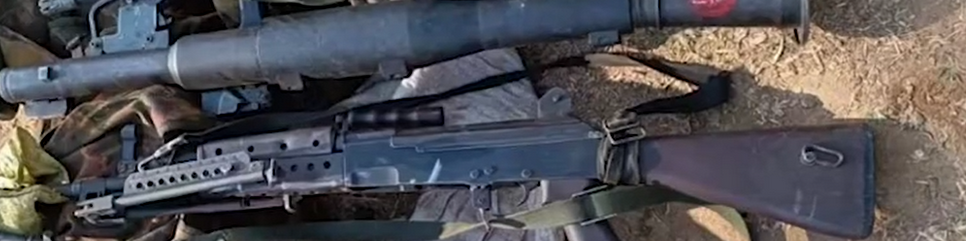
Captured MA-2 in Kyaukme.

Light machine gun version with a heavy barrel and a bipod mounted.

It was originally developed without the idea of using a drum magazine, relying on standard capacity magazines, but it can be used with drum magazines.

The handguard has two rows of ventilation holes that are parallel to the barrel. It has a carry handle, long/heavy barrel and bipod. The bipods used are thin-based for Mk. I versions, but the Mk. II versions are seen with bipods that are cloned from those used for the M60 GPMG.

=== MA-3 ===
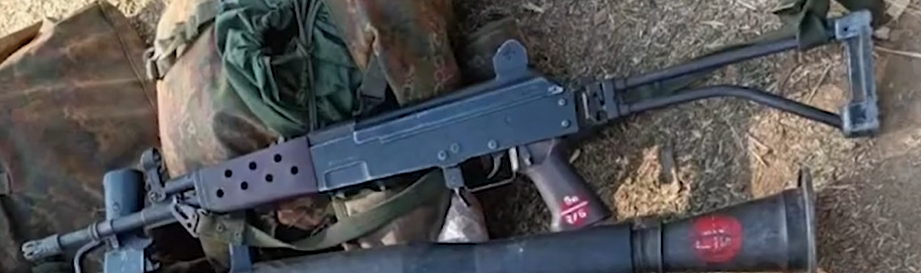
Captured MA-3 in Kyaukme.

Carbine version with a folding metal buttstock. The stock is rarely used due to great difficulty in moving it and to fully depress the lock in order to unfold it. Can be used with suppressors made from AISI-321 stainless steel.

Early models were badly made due to the materials used in its manufacture before they were fully resolved through the Mk II variant.

=== MA-4 ===
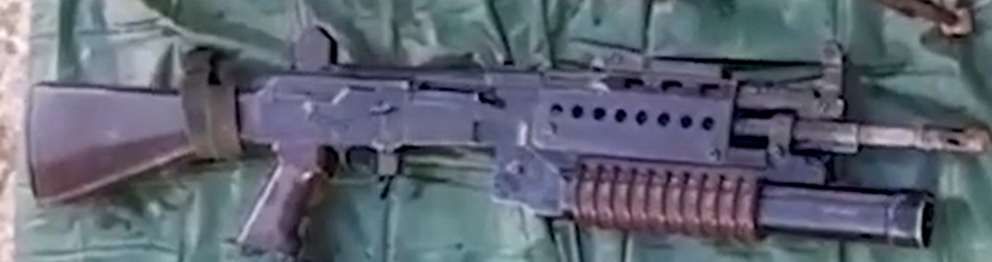
Captured MA-4 by TNLA.

A version of the MA-1 equipped with an underbarrel grenade launcher (UBGL), known as the BA203 (Burma Army 203).

It is an unlicensed clone of the MKEK T-40. (Note: Other sources mention that it's an unlicensed clone of the M203.) The UBGL is permanently fixed, which cannot be removed.

=== MA-S ===
Known as Myanmar Army Sniper, a designated marksman rifle variant based on the MA-2. They are used with a PSO-1 scope.

It's chambered in 7.62x51 NATO caliber and fires from a 10-round magazine. There are reports indicating that production may have started as early as 2011 to 2012. It has a total weight of 5.3 kg, a total length of 1140 mm and a barrel length of 620 mm. The rifle has a muzzle velocity of 852 m/s and an effective range of 1000 meters.

The MA-S consist of a Mk. I and Mk. II version. The Mk. I resembles a Dragunov that can take 10-round magazines with a PSO-1 scope.

The Mk. II resembles Zastava-based rifles that can take 20-round magazines. It has a picatinny rail under the gas block to install a bipod. It comes in two colors; green or black furniture. A version of the Mk. II in a camo finish was on display at the 2019 Defence and Security arms fair.

There is a MA-S variant made for Tatmadaw soldiers participating in overseas shooting competitions such as the ASEAN Armies Rifle Meet.

=== Mk. II ===
==== Pre-2019 ====
The Mk. II variant saw the use of polymer to replace the black stock of the Mk. I. It was also often equipped with polymer stocks, pistol grips, and fore-ends as standard issue.

==== Post-2019 ====
The newer Mk II variants were shown overseas at the 2019 Defense and Security exhibition in Bangkok, Thailand, which was visited by Min Aung Hlaing. This variant was publicly shown in 2022 with the Tatmadaw with a telescopic stock and picatinny rail on the upper receiver. It was supposed to be shown in public in 2020, but was postponed due to the COVID-19 pandemic.

The new Mk II magazine is based on the South African polymer Vektor R4 magazine. The black moulds used in the newer Mk II variants were allegedly based on moulding materials provided by CAA Industries.

By the Myanmar Civil War of 2021, all Mk. I variants were replaced by the Mk. II.

A variant of the MA1 Mk II known as T1 was seen in the hands of Myanmar Army soldiers since December 2025. Small numbers of them were captured by various rebel forces.

== Users ==
- Myanmar
  - Tatmadaw
  - Myanmar Police Force

=== Non-state actors ===
- Karen National Liberation Army
- Karenni Army
- People's Defence Force (Myanmar)
- Shan State Army (RCSS)
- Ta'ang National Liberation Army
