= DI MA-1 Mk. III =

2012 Burmese bullpup assault rifle

MA-1 Mk. III
- Type: Bullpup assault rifle (MA-1 Mk. III); Bullpup light machine gun (MA-2 Mk. III); Bullpup carbine (MA-3 Mk. III)
- Place of origin: Myanmar

Service history
- In service: 2012-Present
- Used by: Myanmar
- Wars: Myanmar civil war

Production history
- Designer: Duo Yingxian (Note: Minor adaptions were made to the original Chinese design.)
- Manufacturer: Myanmar Directorate of Defence Industries
- Produced: 2012-Present
- Variants: See Variants

Specifications
- Mass: 3.4 kg (7.5 lb)
- Length: 740 mm (29 in)
- Barrel length: 123 mm (4.8 in)
- Cartridge: 5.56×45mm NATO
- Cartridge weight: Short-stroke piston, rotating bolt
- Rate of fire: 650 rounds/min
- Muzzle velocity: 930 m/s (3,100 ft/s)
- Effective firing range: 400 m (440 yd)
- Feed system: 30-round magazine
- Sights: Hooded post front sight and aperture rear sight (Standard); Y/MA 95-002 telescopic sight (Optional)

The DI MA-1 Mk. III is a family of Myanmar-made Bullpup assault rifles chambered for 5.56×45mm NATO, based on the QBZ-97s that were exported to Myanmar in 2009. Despite claims that Myanmar made them as an indigenous weapon, the MA-1 Mk. IIIs were made without any licensing agreements with China.

The MA designation on the weapon means Myanmar Army.

== History ==
Myanmar decided to redesign a bullpup rifle after Tatmadaw troops reported multiple failures with the EMER-K1, an earlier bullpup rifle clone of the QBZ-97, ranging from gun jams to stoppages. At the time, some of them were issued to Tatmadaw forces on patrol duties at the Yadana gas field in 1998. Myanmar originally wanted to acquire QBZ-97s and eventually set up a production line to manufacture them on its own, but China refused to honor them due to arms sanctions against the State Peace and Development Council. Subsequently, the QBZ-97s previously sold to Myanmar were not returned.

The QBZ-97 rifles with Myanmar were reverse engineered again; they did not seek Chinese assistance in creating the MA-1 Mk. IIIs. During analysis of the rifles in 2009, they were reported to be suitable for the Tatmadaw in jungle operations.

The MA-1 Mk. IIIs were first shown in public in 2012. They were subsequently shown at various Tatmadaw Armed Forces Day parades.

Plans were made to fully adopt the MA-1 Mk. III by 2016, but it was delayed due to quality issues. At the time, it was reported that the MA-1 Mk. IIIs had poor reliability in the field. Chinese media criticized Myanmar for cloning the QBZ-97 without permission after the rifle was publicly revealed.

In 2020, Myanmar social media photos showed an improved version of the MA-3 Mk. III, implying that production issues were mostly resolved.

== Design ==
According to the Special Advisory Council for Myanmar (SAC-M), the rifle family is reportedly being manufactured at DDI's KaPaSa 22 factory.

While the MA-1 Mk. III has visual similarities with the QBZ-97; the difference lies with the use of phenolic plastic materials instead of engineered plastics, which gives off the brown finish. Another difference is the shape of the handguard and the vent holes on it. The MA-1 Mk. IIIs use waffle-based 30-round STANAG magazines.

The MA-1 Mk. IIIs do not use the same Type 95 bayonet made for the QBZ-95. Instead, the Tatmadaw uses a clone of the Type 81 bayonet for the rifles. Only the MA-1/3 Mk. III have bayonet lugs installed as a default option.

For the MA-3 Mk. III, some of the more recently made carbines have carry handles that have a more rectangular shape, a more ergonomic front handguard, and vent holes, making it resemble the QBZ-97.

== Variants ==
=== MA-1 Mk. III ===
The standard assault rifle variant is based on the QBZ-97.

=== MA-2 Mk. III ===
The light machine gun variant with a long barrel and a bipod.

=== MA-3 Mk. III ===
A carbine variant. Known to be used by Myanma special forces units.

=== MA-4 Mk. III ===
A variant of the MA-1 Mk. III equipped with an underbarrel grenade launcher. It is also known to be used by Myanmar special forces units.

== Users ==
- Myanmar: Tatmadaw, including the Myanmar Navy SEALs.

== Bibliography ==
- Johnson, Gary Paul; Nelson, Thomas B. (2016-12-15). The World's Assault Rifles. Ironside International Publishers. ISBN 9781619846012.
