= HQ-12 =

Chinese model of surface-to-air missile

HQ-12 (KS-1A)
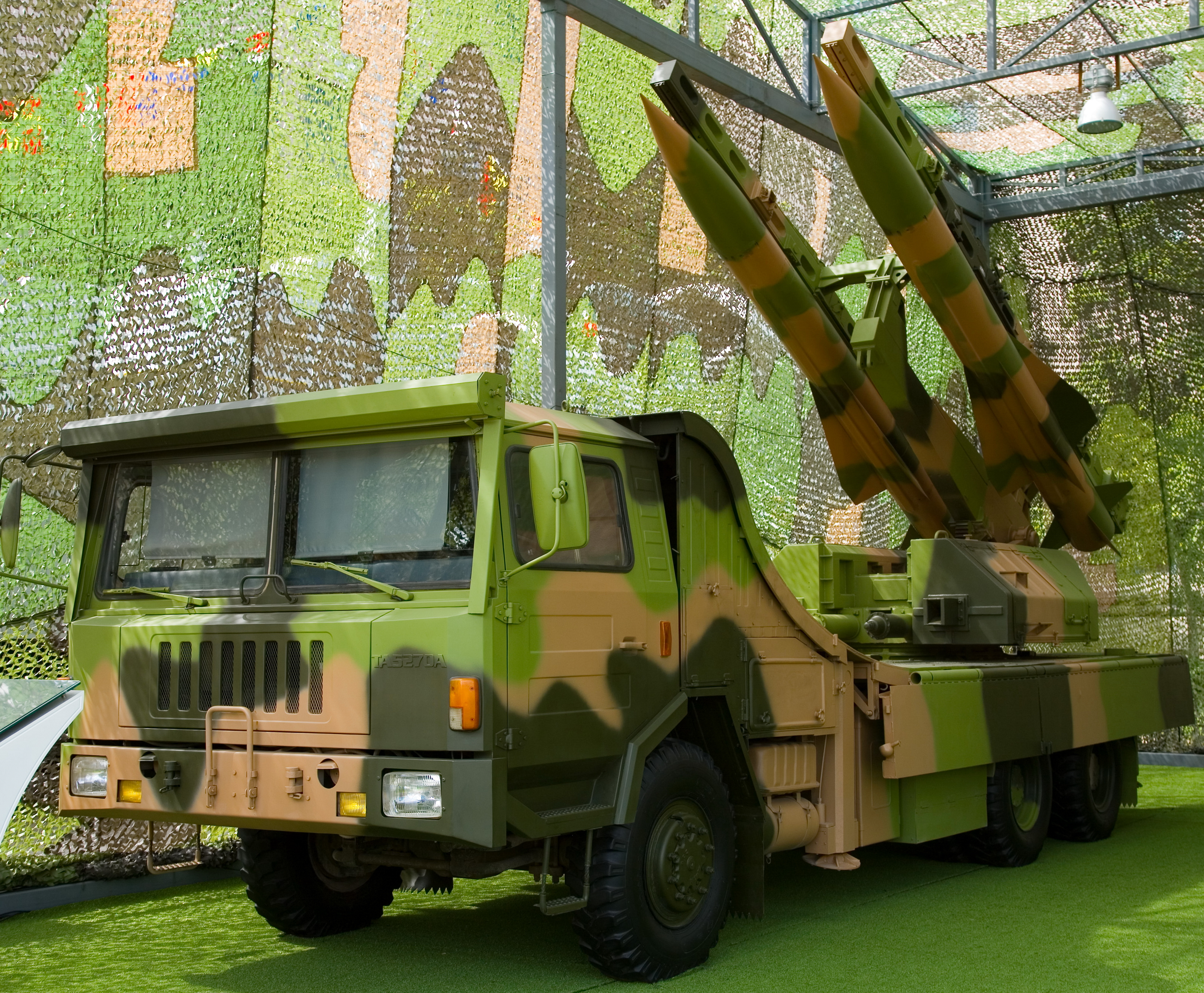
- A KS-1A mobile SAM launcher on display at the Military Museum of the Chinese People's Revolution in Beijing
- Type: Surface-to-air missile
- Place of origin: China

Service history
- In service: 2007–present
- Used by: See § Operators

Specifications
- Mass: 900 kg (2,000 lb)
- Length: 5,644 mm (222.2 in)
- Diameter: 400 mm (16 in)
- Wingspan: 1,200 mm (47 in)
- Warhead: 100 kg (220 lb)
- Detonation mechanism: Impact/proximity
- Engine: Rocket motor
- Propellant: Solid fuel
- Operational range: 5 km (3.1 mi) to 50 km (31 mi)
- Flight altitude: 500 m (1,600 ft) to 25 km (16 mi)
- Maximum speed: 1,200 m/s (3,900 ft/s)
- Guidance system: Semi-active radar homing/radio-command guidance
- Launch platform: 6x6

The KS-1 or Kaishan-1 (Chinese: 凯山一号), military designation HQ-12 (simplified Chinese: 红旗-12; traditional Chinese: 紅旗-12; pinyin: Hóng Qí-Yāo èr; lit. 'Red Banner-12'; NATO reporting name: CH-SA-12) is the first Chinese surface-to-air missile to adopt a phased array radar.

== Development ==
HQ-12 prototypes, known as the KS-1 before being incorporated into the PLA service, were developed in the early 1980s. The developer was the state-owned Jiangnan Space Industry, also known as Base 061. The first successful test-firing of the missile prototype was conducted in 1989, and the development was concluded in 1994. Before its completion, the missile was showcased at Paris Airshow in 1991. It was showcased again at the Zhuhai Airshow in 1998. However, none of these showcases resulted in mass production due to the lack of People's Liberation Army (PLA) orders and foreign interests.

The development of the improved variant KS-1A was concluded in the late 1990s, and the finished product was presented in 2001 by China Precision Machinery Import-Export Corporation. The new system included a cross-country chassis and a new multifunction radar. In 2005, Malaysia signed a memorandum of understanding to purchase KS-1A. Testing of the KS-1A was also undertaken by the Chinese PLA, and the system with new military designation HQ-12 was showcased at the 80th-anniversary exhibition of the PLA, indicating its military service. In 2009, the HQ-12 participated in the parade celebrating the 60th anniversary of China.

The KS-1A and improved variants were eventually exported to Myanmar, Turkmenistan and Thailand. 2016, the HQ-22, the further development of the HQ-12 system was revealed at Airshow China 2016.

== Design ==
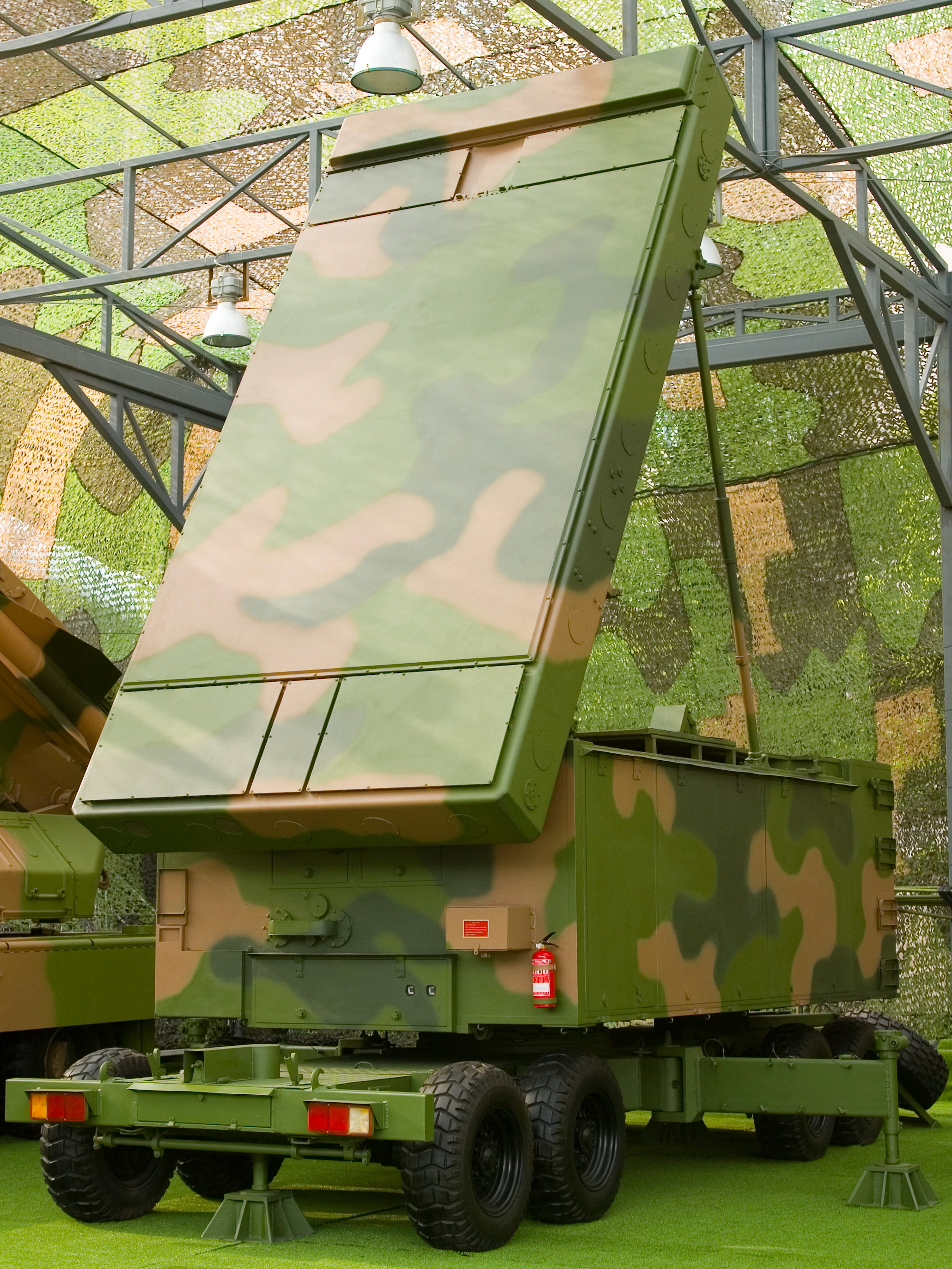
A H-200 radar on display in 2007

The HQ-12, or KS-1, was the first Chinese air defense system equipped with a phased-array radar. The radar system was constantly improved with each new variant of the missile system. A typical HQ-12 battery includes one passive phased-array radar (PPAR) panel, four launchers fitted with two missiles per launcher, and 16 additional missiles on reload trucks, command-and-control station, and generator units.

The first KS-1 variant used SJ-212 engagement radar, derived from the Russian 30N6E1, which is capable of tracking 50 targets at a range of up to 27 kilometers. The KS-1A has two options: HT-233 with 50 kilometers range and H-200 multifunction radar with 70 kilometers range. KS-1C kept the H-200 radar from KS-1A but replaced rail launchers with canister-launched missiles. Overall, the KS-1 is a rough equivalent of American MIM-23 Hawk, the precursor to the Patriot missile system.

Although the performance of the original KS-1 is obsolete, the HQ-12 (KS-1A) is a more reliable and capable platform primarily designed to destroy aircraft, UAVs, and helicopters. It can also serve as missile defense platform, engaging ballistic and cruise missiles with speeds exceeding Mach 3.

== Operational history ==
The People's Liberation Army (PLA) used KS-1A as the basis for the HQ-12 missile system due to the KS-1A having better performance than the original KS-1.

== Variants ==
KS-1
The initial version with the SJ-202 engagement radar, and the missile seeker has a traditional parabolic antenna and can guide up to two missiles against one target. The range is >40 km (25 mi, 21.5 nmi).
KS-1A
[The new HT-233 radar has a range of 50 km (31 mi, 27 nmi), and engagement altitude is 24 km (78,700 ft). It can also use H-200 radar with 70 km (43.5 mi, 38 nmi) range and 27 km (88,580 ft) engagement altitude.
KS-1C
Developed by the China Aerospace Science and Industry Corporation (CASIC). Featuring canister-launched missiles.
HQ-12
Chinese military designation. HQ-12 is based on KS-1A with H-200 radar.
KS-1M
Myanmar's locally made variant of Chinese HQ-12 with TOT under licence. It was unveiled with one battery at the Armed Force Day Parade in 2017. Two surface-to-air missiles are fitted on each locally made Miltruk chassis. The name of the missile is GYD-1B and also looks a little bit fatter than the Chinese version. But, the maximum range of the missile is unknown. According to the local media, the maximum range of KS-1M is equal to the range of KS-1C's missile.
HQ-22
The HQ-22 (export designation FK-3) is the second-generation variant of the HQ-12, has a range of up to 170km (105.6 mi, 91.8 nmi) and an effective altitude from 50 m (164 ft) to 27 km (88,580 ft). It has a considerably longer range than HQ-12 and serves as an affordable alternative to produce than the HQ-9.

== Operators ==
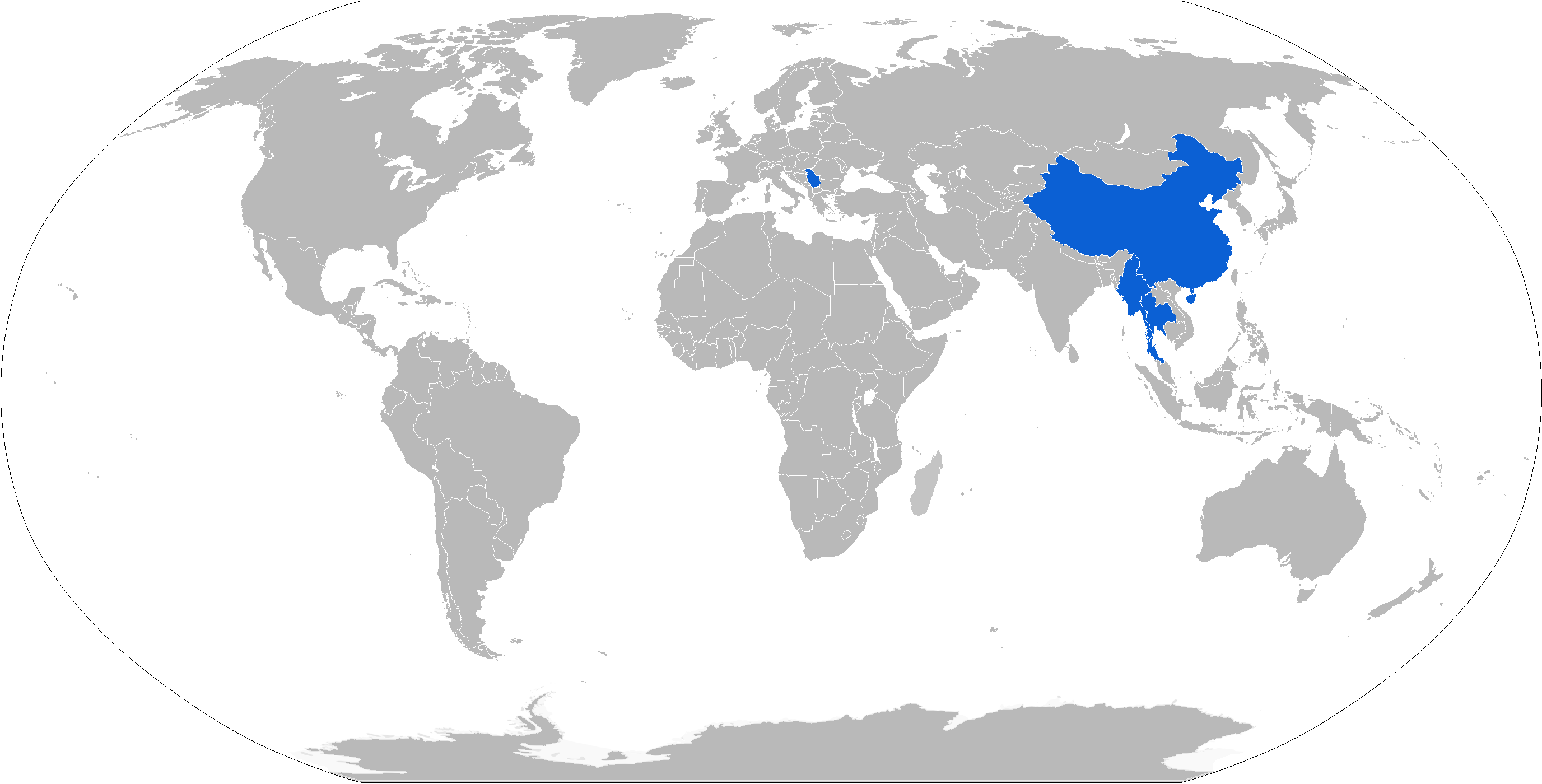
Map with KS-1 operators in blue

China

- People's Liberation Army Air Force - 150 as of 2020

Myanmar

- Myanmar Army - 15 batteries of KS-1A and locally made KS-1M.

Thailand

- Royal Thai Air Force - 2 KS-1C systems in service 2016.

Cambodia

- Royal Cambodian Armed Forces - 4 Batteries of KS-1C in service 2024.

== Specifications (KS-1) ==
- Weight: 900 kg (1,984 lbs)
- Warhead: > 100 kg (220 lbs)
- Length: 5.6 m (18 ft)
- Diameter: 0.4 m (1.3 ft)
- Speed: 1,200 m/s (2,684 mph, 4,320 km/h)
- Maneuverability: > 20 g
- Maximum target speed: 750 m/s (1,678 mph, 2,700 km/h)
- Maximum target maneuverability: > 5 g
- Maximum range: > 50 km (31 mi, 27 nmi)
- Minimum range: 100 m (330 ft)
- Maximum altitude: > 25 km (82,000 ft)
- Minimum altitude: < 500 m (1,640 ft)

== Gallery ==
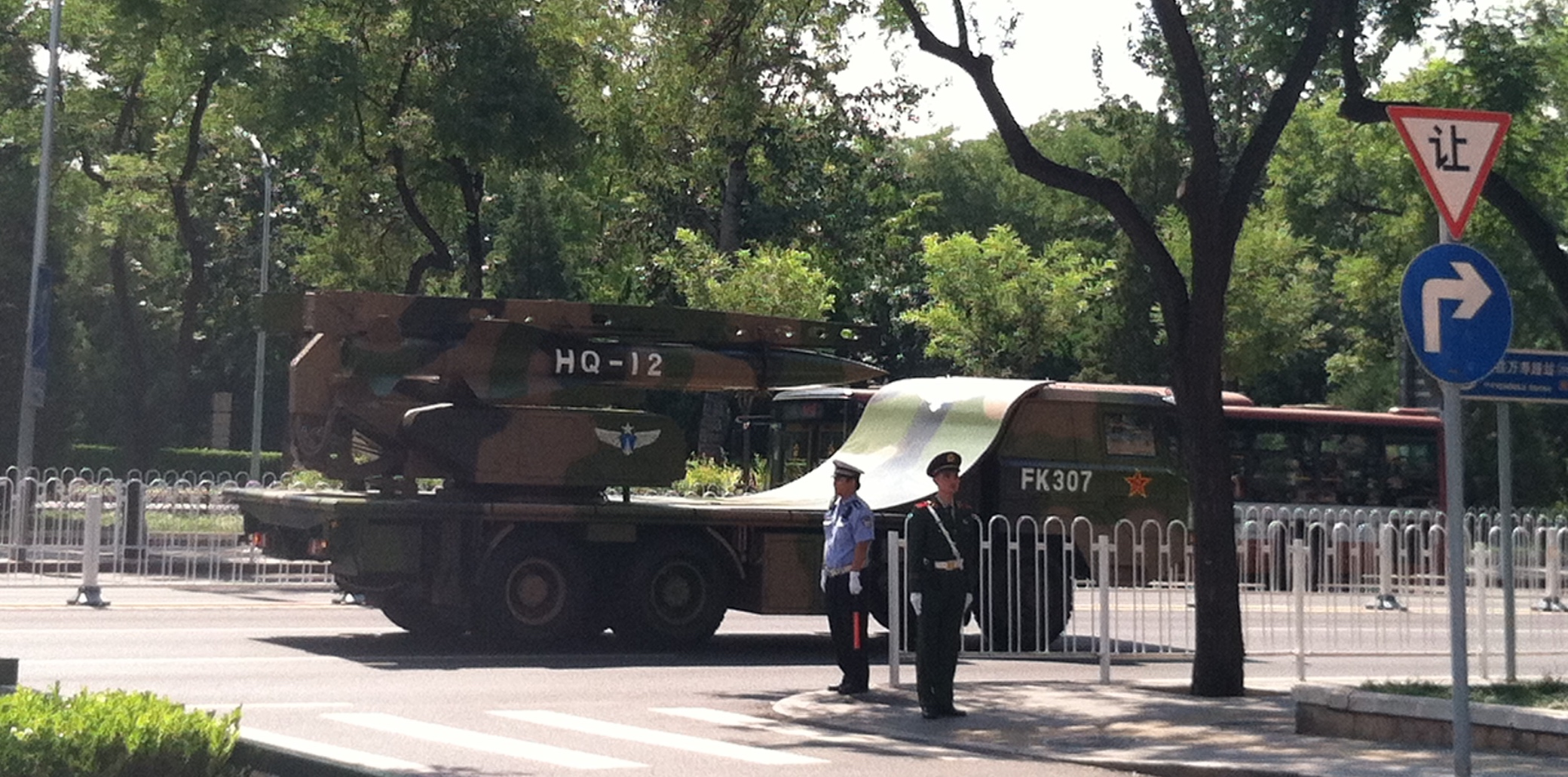
HQ-12 as seen after the military parade held in Beijing on September 3, 2015 to commemorate 70 years since the end of WWII.

== See also ==
- Akash – (India)
- Type 3 Chū-SAM – (Japan)
- NASAMS – (Norway, United States)
- Barak 8 – (India, Israel)
- QRSAM – (India)
- VL-SRSAM – (India)
