= Mazda Pathfinder XV-1 =

Mazda Pathfinder XV-1 Mazda Jeep
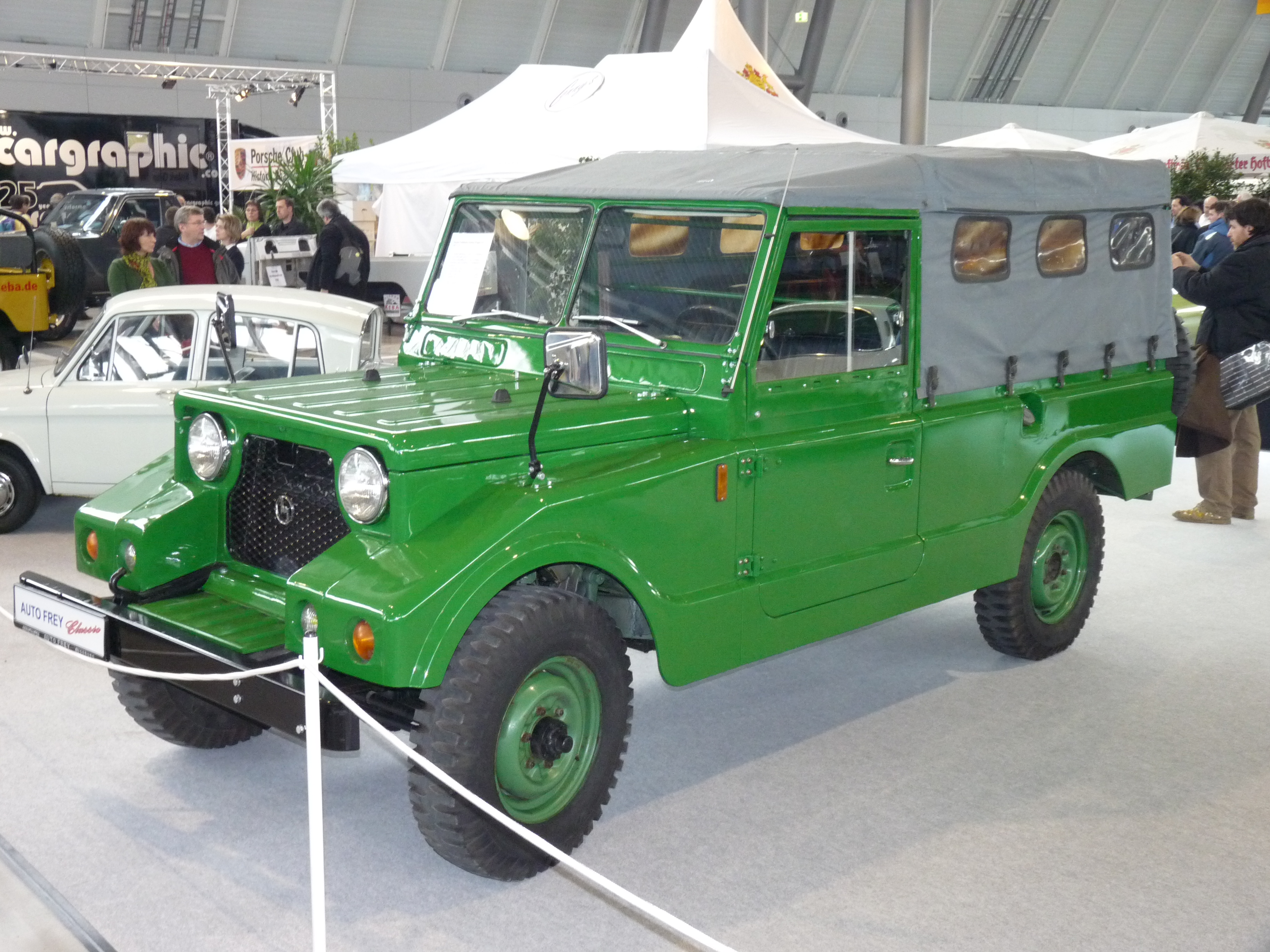
- Mazda Pathfinder XV-1
- Type: 4×4 utility truck
- Place of origin: Myanmar

Service history
- In service: 1970s
- Used by: Military of Myanmar, Myanmar Police Force
- Wars: Internal conflict in Myanmar

Production history
- Manufacturer: Mazda via knock down kits Myanmar Ministry of Industry's No. 2 Automobile Factory, Htonbo
- Produced: 1970–1972, possibly mid-1990s
- Variants: soft top and hard top station wagon

Specifications
- Engine: Inline 4 Mazda 2 liter, optional diesel 90 hp (67 kW; 91 PS)
- Power/weight: 49 hp/ST (54.0 hp/t)
- Transmission: 3 speed x 2 range transfer case
- Suspension: Live axles on leaf springs front and rear

The Mazda Pathfinder XV-1, commonly called the Mazda Jeep (Burmese: မာဇဒါဂျစ်), is a 4x4 Mazda built from 1970 to 1973 in an assembly plant in Myanmar strictly for the Myanmar market. The Pathfinder XV-1s were used mostly by the Military of Myanmar, the police, and government officials. They were later sold to the public.

The Pathfinder XV-1 was designed in Hiroshima, but the vehicle was exclusively assembled and sold in Myanmar.

== History ==
The vehicle was manufactured in the 1970s in Myanmar as a complete knockdown unit starting from Salane Number plates. Later, a factory was established in Htonebo Pyay for semi-knockdown units and gradually for assembly with locally made parts.

== Design ==
The Pathfinder XV-1s were sold in Myanmar in bright green. Other color variants, such as metallic blue, blue, and light metallic green, were produced in later parts of the 90s, although the original color was bright green. The original versions were made with a short body powered by a 2000cc engine having a model called VA. Later, a long body version was introduced whose body was extended with rivets. The original gasoline engine was designed with double coil and double ignition points with a sealed ignition system to be able to stand water. The long body version was called the 5-hook version. Those cars were not available to the public till the 1990s.

Another Variant called Path Finder was introduced with a fiber roof top, a long body, and two gasoline tanks powered by the same VA Engine with 2000cc. The power is not enough for those long body versions due to the weight of the frame and body. Most engines for the car are based on the VA engine, which has been used in E2000, T2000 for three decades. Later, some Korean diesel engines and Chinese engines were introduced. Some modified or repowered the car with a Toyota 2C diesel engine for some periods.

Those cars were given to high-ranking officials from the 1970s to the 2000s. The unique spray pattern of the body from the original version could not be mimicked at outside body repair shops. The front end's leaf spring is of reverse type. Most front axle joints were disassembled by users due to fuel economy issues. Original versions came with Yokohama tires and the vehicle can top around 70MPH, having an 80MPH limit. Later, models were used with locally made tires, which produced a lot of tire noise. The car has a high center of gravity and tends to roll over in rainy, slippery conditions.

== Variants ==
The Pathfinder XV-1 came as either soft-tops or hard-tops and could seat up to nine people on a pair of large folding benches in the rear. The Pathfinder XV-1s came in long or short wheelbase versions with a canvas roof.

Some hardtop SWB versions were also made, as were four-door LWB wagons (the LWB canvas-top cars were always two-door).

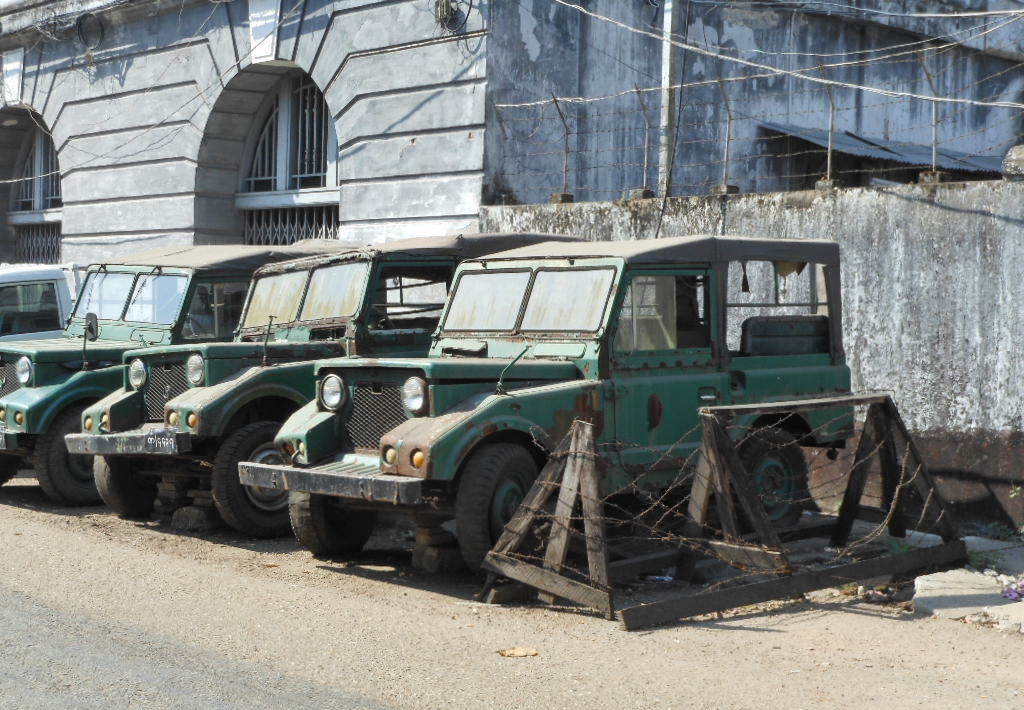
Abandoned short wheelbase Mazda Pathfinders

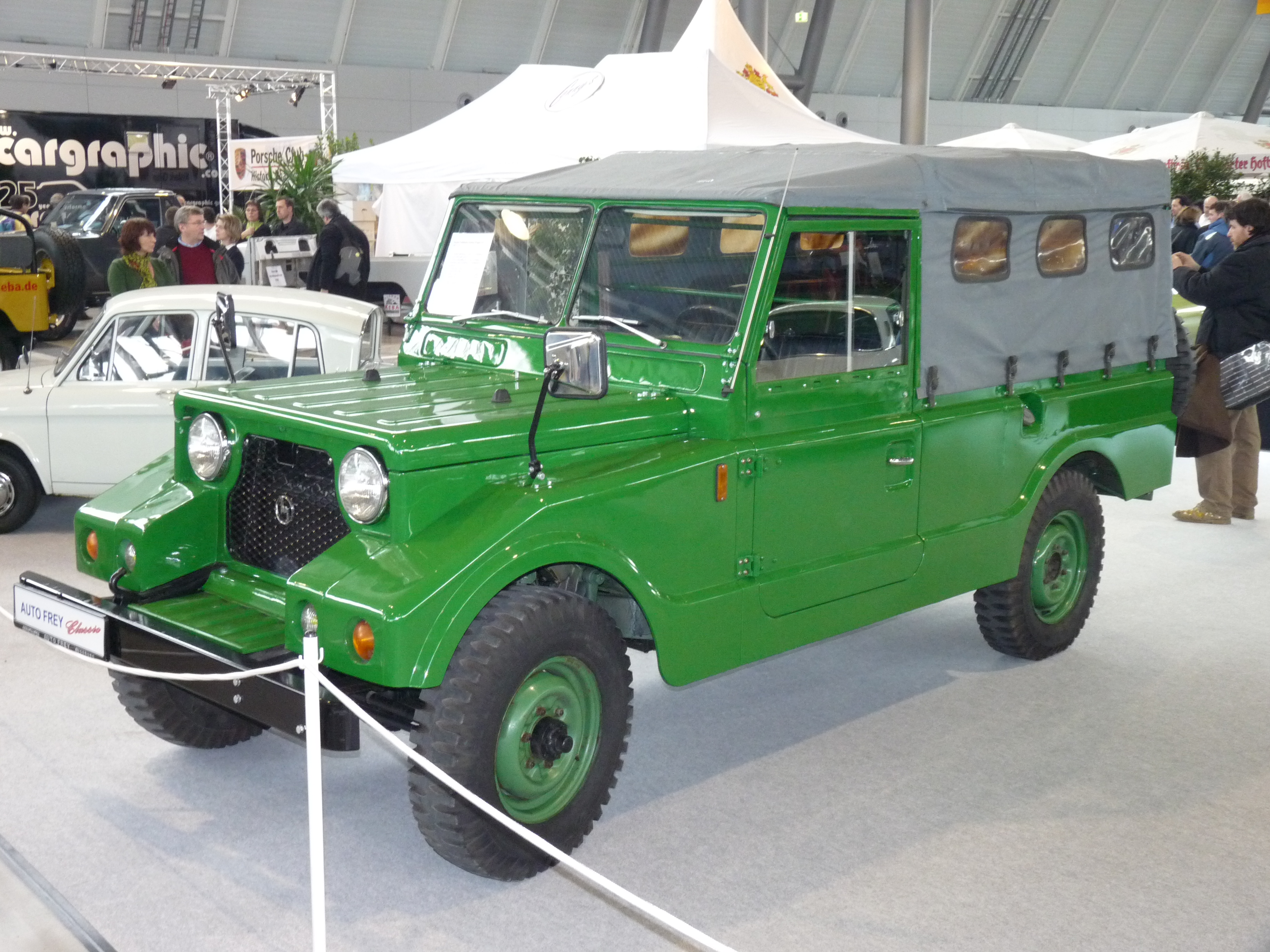
Mazda Pathfinder Station Wagon XV-1 SW 4x4 front left

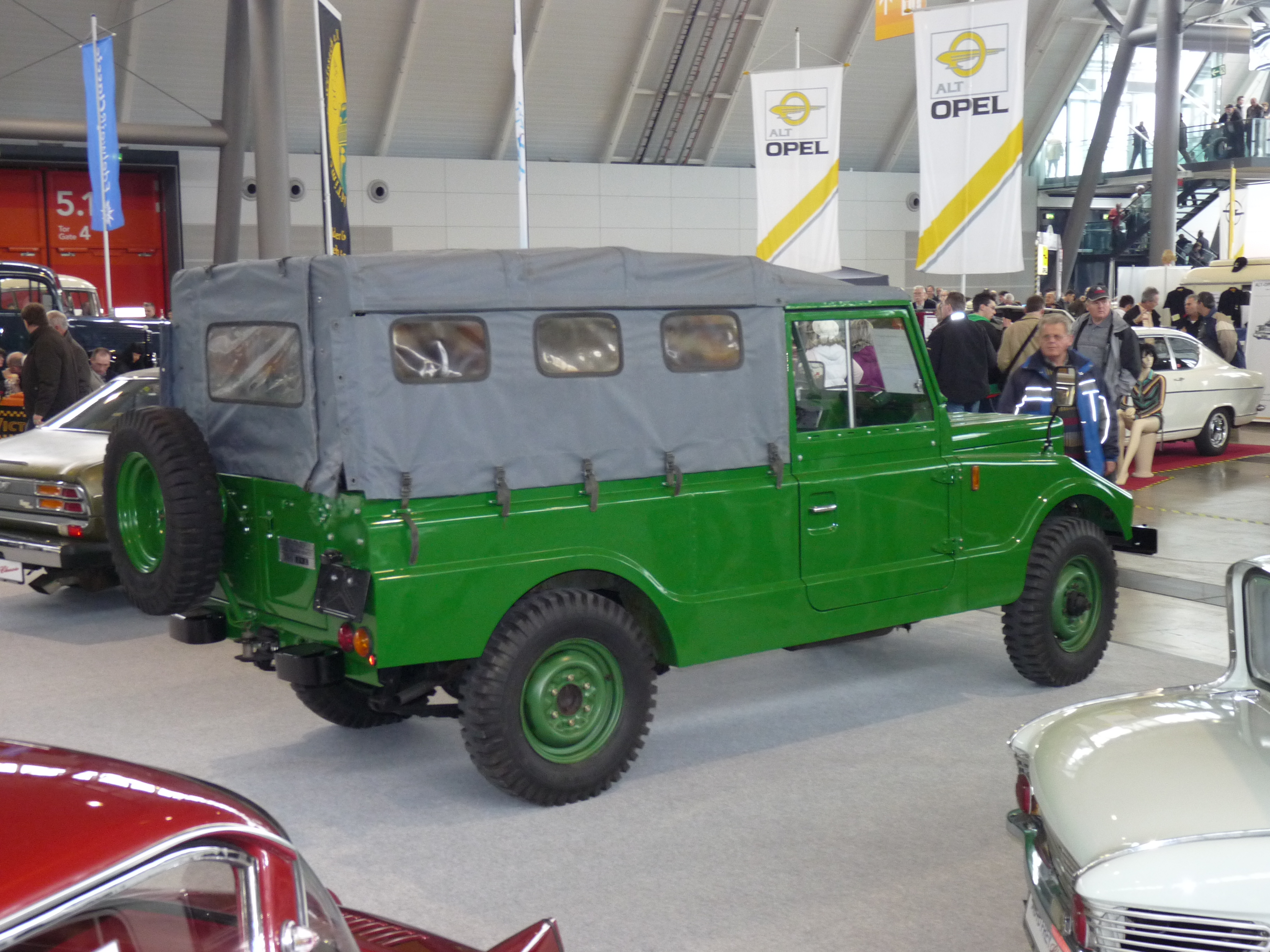
Mazda Pathfinder Station Wagon XV-1 SW 4x4 right rear
