= Myanmar Air Defense Forces =

Air Defence branch of Tatmadaw

Air Defense Forces
- လေကြောင်းရန်ကာကွယ်ရေးတပ်ဖွဲ့
- Founded: 1997; 29 years ago
- Country: Myanmar
- Size: 25000 personnel (2019)
- Part of: Tatmadaw
- Headquarters: Naypyidaw
- Mottos: ကျွမ်းကျင်၊လျင်မြန်၊သေချာ၊အောင်မြင်; Skill Speed Sure Success

Commanders
- Chief of Air Defence: Lieutenant general Tin Maung Win
- Vice-chief of Air Defence: Major General Nay Myo Oo (DSA-34)

The Air Defense Forces (လေကြောင်းရန်ကာကွယ်ရေးတပ်ဖွဲ့) is one of the major branches of Tatmadaw. It was established as the Air Defence Command in 1997, but was not fully operational until late 1999. It was renamed the Bureau of Air Defence in the early 2000s. In early 2000, Tatmadaw established the Myanmar Integrated Air Defence System (MIADS) with help from Russia, Ukraine and China. It is a tri-service bureau with units from all three branches of the armed forces. All air defence assets except anti-aircraft artillery are integrated into MIADS.

In 2010, Myanmar Air Defence Command completed installation of an optical fibre communication network throughout the country. The network is to be used for air defence operations between Central Command HQ from the capital (Naypyidaw) and several air bases, early warning radar stations and mobile anti-aircraft missile and artillery units. After completion of the fibre optic project and radar stations, MIADS (Myanmar Integrated Air Defence System) is the most advance AD system in the region.

== Command and control structure ==
The Office of the Chief of Air Defence is based in Naypyidaw, and the position of the Chief of Air Defence is Lieutenant General. The position of Vice-Chief of Air Defence is held by a person with the rank of Major General. Three Brigadier generals from Myanmar Army, Myanmar Navy and Myanmar Air Force serve as Deputy-Chief of Air Defence. There are nine Air Defence Operation Commands and one Air Defense Training School. Each Air Defence Operation Command is also directed by a brigadier general. Under each Air Defence Operation Command, there is an Air Defence Early Warning Battalion, an Air Defence Signal Battalion, an Air Defence ECM Battalion, an Air Defence Mechanism Battalion, an Air Defence Workshop Battalion, and Air Defence Battalions which are also known as La Ka Ta (လကတ).

== Equipment ==
Each early warning battalion is equipped with a 3D air surveillance radar, such as JY-27A radar, YLC-2V radar, 80K6 radar and 1L-117 radar, or a 2D VHF radar, such as Vostok-E radar and P-18M radar. Each electronic countermeasure battalion is equipped with chinese and ukrainian mobile ECM and ELINT systems. Each air defence (mechanism) battalion is equipped with two batteries of medium-range air defence systems. The air defence battalions (La Ka Ta) are divided into three; Anti-aircraft artillery battalions, short-range SAM battalions (for point defence role) and medium-range SAM battalions (for area defence role). Battalion numbers from 1,005 to 1019 are anti-aircraft artillery battalions and they are equipped with a large number of ground-based anti-aircraft guns. Battalion numbers from 2010 to 2032 are short-range SAM battalions and each battalion is equipped with a lot of MANPADs, 3-5 TH-5711 smart hunter radars or TWS-312 radars (licence built TH-5711 radar), 5 Tunguska-M1 self-propelled anti-aircraft systems or Tor-M1 and 10-15 Type-87 self-propelled anti-aircraft guns. Battalion numbers from 3,009 to 3036 are medium-range SAM battalions and they are equipped with one battery of medium-range air defence systems or one battery of S-200 air defence system (only two battalions located at Nay Pyi Taw Region and Yangon Region) with additional target detection and tracking radars, height-finding radars, fire control radars, etc.

== Chiefs ==
Chiefs of Air Defence	Years	Notes
Lt. General Soe Win	1997–2004	Later became Prime Minister
Lt. General Myint Hlaing	2004–2010	Later became Union Minister for Agricultural and Irrigation
Lt. General Sein Win	2010–2015	Later became Union Minister for Defense
Lt. General Tin Maung Win	2016–2021	
Lt. General Myo Moe Aung	2021–	

== Lists of commands and battalions ==
=== Training school ===
Training School	Nickname	Location	Note
Air Defence Training School	La Ta Ka	near Taung Nyo region, Ottarathiri Township	Located at the "19°53'51"N 96°03'06"E".

=== Air Defence Operation Commands ===
Air Defence Operation Commands (ADOC)	Nickname	Headquarters	Note
1st Air Defence Operation Command	La Sa Kha-1	Phaung Gyi, Hlegu Township, Yangon	Command the air defence battalions located in Bago Region.
2nd Air Defence Operation Command	La Sa Kha-2	near Myeik Airport, Myeik	Command the air defence battalions located in Tanintharyi Region.
3rd Air Defence Operation Command	La Sa Kha-3	Loilem Township	Command the air defence battalions located in Shan State.
4th Air Defence Operation Command	La Sa Kha-4	Thaton	Command the air defence battalions located in Mon State.
5th Air Defence Operation Command	La Sa Kha-5	Hmawbi Township, Yangon	Command the air defence battalions located in Yangon Region.
6th Air Defence Operation Command	La Sa Kha-6	Unknown	
7th Air Defence Operation Command	La Sa Kha-7	near Sawye (also called Sun Ye) village, Kyaukse	Command the air defence battalions located in Mandalay Region.
8th Air Defence Operation Command	La Sa Kha-8	near Taung Nyo region, Ottarathiri Township	Located 4.5 km south of the air defence training school. Command the air defence battalions located in Naypyidaw Union Territory.
9th Air Defence Operation Command	La Sa Kha-9	Seikphyu Township, Pakokku District	Command the air defence battalions located in Magway Region and Rakhine State.

=== Air defence battalions ===
Air defence battalions	Nick name	Location	Regional Military Command (RMC)	Note
No.(1) Air Defence (Early Warning) Battalion	La Ta Ya-1	Phaung Gyi, Hlegu Township, Yangon	Yangon Regional Command	Equipped with Vostok-E radar.Located at (17°19′25″N 96°15′01″E).
No.(2) Air Defence (Early Warning) Battalion	La Ta Ya-2	near Myeik Airport, Myeik	Coastal Regional Command	Equipped with 80K6 radar.Located at (12°26′26″N 98°37′28″E).
No.(3) Air Defence (Early Warning) Battalion	La Ta Ya-3	Loilem Township	East Central Regional Command	
No.(4) Air Defence (Early Warning) Battalion	La Ta Ya-4	Thaton	South Eastern Regional Command	
No.(5) Air Defence (Early Warning) Battalion	La Ta Ya-5	Hmawbi Township, Yangon	Yangon Regional Command	
No.(6) Air Defence (Early Warning) Battalion	La Ta Ya-6	Unknown	Unknown	
No.(7) Air Defence (Early Warning) Battalion	La Ta Ya-7	near Sawye(also called Sun Ye) village, Kyaukse	Central Regional Command	
No.(8) Air Defence (Early Warning) Battalion	La Ta Ya-8	near Taung Nyo region, Ottarathiri Township	Nay Pyi Taw Regional Command	Equipped with JY-27A radar.Located at (19°51′34″N 96°03′30″E).
No.(9) Air Defence (Early Warning) Battalion	La Ta Ya-9	Seikphyu Township, Pakokku District	Central Regional Command	
No.(1) Air Defence (Signal) Battalion	La Sa Ya-1	Phaung Gyi, Hlegu Township, Yangon	Yangon Regional Command	
No.(2) Air Defence (Signal) Battalion	La Sa Ya-2	near Myeik Airport, Myeik	Coastal Regional Command	
No.(3) Air Defence (Signal) Battalion	La Sa Ya-3	Loilem Township	East Central Regional Command	
No.(4) Air Defence (Signal) Battalion	La Sa Ya-4	Thaton	South Eastern Regional Command	
No.(5) Air Defence (Signal) Battalion	La Sa Ya-5	Hmawbi Township, Yangon	Yangon Regional Command	
No.(6) Air Defence (Signal) Battalion	La Sa Ya-6	Unknown	Unknown	
No.(7) Air Defence (Signal) Battalion	La Sa Ya-7	near Sawye (also called Sun Ye) village, Kyaukse	Central Regional Command	
No.(8) Air Defence (Signal) Battalion	La Sa Ya-8	near Taung Nyo region, Ottarathiri Township	Nay Pyi Taw Regional Command	
No.(9) Air Defence (Signal) Battalion	La Sa Ya-9	Seikphyu Township, Pakokku District	Central Regional Command	
No.(1) Air Defence (ECM) Battalion	La A Ya-1	Phaung Gyi, Hlegu Township, Yangon	Yangon Regional Command	
No.(2) Air Defence (ECM) Battalion	La A Ya-2	Ye village, Myeik	Coastal Regional Command	
No.(3) Air Defence (ECM) Battalion	La A Ya-3	Loilem Township	East Central Regional Command	
No.(4) Air Defence (ECM) Battalion	La A Ya-4	Thaton	South Eastern Regional Command	
No.(5) Air Defence (ECM) Battalion	La A Ya-5	Hmawbi Township, Yangon	Yangon Regional Command	
No.(6) Air Defence (ECM) Battalion	La A Ya-6	Unknown	Unknown	
No.(7) Air Defence (ECM) Battalion	La A Ya-7	Mt. Dat Taw, Kyaukse	Central Regional Command	
No.(8) Air Defence (ECM) Battalion	La A Ya-8	near Taung Nyo region, Ottarathiri Township	Nay Pyi Taw Regional Command	
No.(9) Air Defence (ECM) Battalion	La A Ya-9	Seikphyu Township, Pakokku District	Central Regional Command	
No.(1) Air Defence (Mechanism) Battalion	La Ya Ta-1	Phaung Gyi, Hlegu Township, Yangon	Yangon Regional Command	
No.(2) Air Defence (Mechanism) Battalion	La Ya Ta-2	near Myeik Airport, Myeik	Coastal Regional Command	
No.(3) Air Defence (Mechanism) Battalion	La Ya Ta-3	Loilem Township	East Central Regional Command	
No.(4) Air Defence (Mechanism) Battalion	La Ya Ta-4	Thaton	South Eastern Regional Command	
No.(5) Air Defence (Mechanism) Battalion	La Ya Ta-5	Hmawbi Township, Yangon	Yangon Regional Command	
No.(6) Air Defence (Mechanism) Battalion	La Ya Ta-6	Unknown	Unknown	
No.(7) Air Defence (Mechanism) Battalion	La Ya Ta-7	Mt. Yat Tat, Kyaukse	Central Regional Command	
No.(8) Air Defence (Mechanism) Battalion	La Ya Ta-8	near Taung Nyo region, Ottarathiri Township	Nay Pyi Taw Regional Command	
No.(9) Air Defence (Mechanism) Battalion	La Ya Ta-9	Seikphyu Township, Pakokku District	Central Regional Command	
No.(1) Air Defence (Workshop) Battalion	La La Ya-1	Phaung Gyi, Hlegu Township, Yangon	Yangon Regional Command	
No.(2) Air Defence (Workshop) Battalion	La La Ya-2	near Myeik Airport, Myeik	Coastal Regional Command	
No.(3) Air Defence (Workshop) Battalion	La La Ya-3	Loilem Township	East Central Regional Command	
No.(4) Air Defence (Workshop) Battalion	La La Ya-4	Thaton	South Eastern Regional Command	
No.(5) Air Defence (Workshop) Battalion	La La Ya-5	Hmawbi Township, Yangon	Yangon Regional Command	
No.(6) Air Defence (Workshop) Battalion	La La Ya-6	Unknown	Unknown	
No.(7) Air Defence (Workshop) Battalion	La La Ya-7	Oak Pho Pyin village, Kyaukse	Central Regional Command	
No.(8) Air Defence (Workshop) Battalion	La La Ya-8	near Taung Nyo region, Ottarathiri Township	Nay Pyi Taw Regional Command	
No.(9) Air Defence (Workshop) Battalion	La La Ya-9	Seikphyu Township, Pakokku District	Central Regional Command	
No.(1005) Air Defence Battalion	La Ka Ta-1005	Namhsan	East Central Regional Command	
No.(1007) Air Defence Battalion	La Ka Ta-1007	Paung	South Eastern Regional Command	
No.(1009) Air Defence Battalion	La Ka Ta-1009	Hmawbi Township, Yangon	Yangon Regional Command	
No.(1010) Air Defence Battalion	La Ka Ta-1010	Tharrawaddy	Southern Regional Command	
No.(1013) Air Defence Battalion	La Ka Ta-1013	Sawye (also called Sun Ye) village, Kyaukse	Central Regional Command	
No.(1014) Air Defence Battalion	La Ka Ta-1014	Madaya Township	Central Regional Command	
No.(1015) Air Defence Battalion	La Ka Ta-1015	Taungoo	Southern Regional Command	
No.(1019) Air Defence Battalion	La Ka Ta-1019	Taung Nyo, Ottarathiri Township	Nay Pyi Taw Regional Command	
No.(2010) Air Defence Battalion	La Ka Ta-2010	Loilem Township	East Central Regional Command	
No.(2011) Air Defence Battalion	La Ka Ta-2011	Unknown	Triangle Regional Command	
No.(2014) Air Defence Battalion	La Ka Ta-2014	Myeik	Coastal Regional Command	
No.(2017) Air Defence Battalion	La Ka Ta-2017	Thanap Chaung village, Taikkyi Township	Yangon Command	
No.(2018) Air Defence Battalion	La Ka Ta-2018	Kawhmu Township	Southern Regional Command	
No.(2019) Air Defence Battalion	La Ka Ta-2019	Hmawbi Township, Yangon	Yangon Regional Command	
No.(2020) Air Defence Battalion	La Ka Ta-2020	Bago	Southern Regional Command	
No.(2025) Air Defence Battalion	La Ka Ta-2025	Meiktila	Central Regional Command	
No.(2026) Air Defence Battalion	La Ka Ta-2026	Yan Tin village, Kyaukse Township	Central Regional Command	
No.(2027) Air Defence Battalion	La Ka Ta-2027	Mongmao Township	Central Regional Command	
No.(2028) Air Defence Battalion	La Ka Ta-2028	Nghat Kyee Thike village, Kyaukse Township	Central Regional Command	
No.(2029) Air Defence Battalion	La Ka Ta-2029	Myo Hla	Southern Regional Command	
No.(2030) Air Defence Battalion	La Ka Ta-2030	Swar	Southern Regional Command	
No.(2031) Air Defence Battalion	La Ka Ta-2031	Lewe	Nay Pyi Taw Regional Command	
No.(2032) Air Defence Battalion	La Ka Ta-2032	Tatkon Township	Nay Pyi Taw Regional Command	
No.(3009) Air Defence Battalion	La Ka Ta-3009	Namhsan	East Central Regional Command	
No.(3014) Air Defence Battalion	La Ka Ta-3014	Thaton	South Eastern Regional Command	
No.(3017) Air Defence Battalion	La Ka Ta-3017	Mingaladon Township, Yangon	Yangon Regional Command	
No.(3018) Air Defence Battalion	La Ka Ta-3018	Yay Kyaw, Pazundaung Township, Yangon	Yangon Regional Command	
No.(3019) Air Defence Battalion	La Ka Ta-3019	Twante Township, Yangon	Yangon Regional Command	
No.(3020) Air Defence Battalion	La Ka Ta-3020	Hmawbi Township, Yangon	Yangon Regional Command	
No.(3025) Air Defence Battalion	La Ka Ta-3025	Shante, Meiktila	Central Regional Command	
No.(3026) Air Defence Battalion	La Ka Ta-3026	Mandalay (beside Mandalay Palace)	Central Regional Command	
No.(3027) Air Defence Battalion	La Ka Ta-3027	Tada-U Township	Central Regional Command	
No.(3028) Air Defence Battalion	La Ka Ta-3028	Kyaukpadaung	Central Regional Command	
No.(3029) Air Defence Battalion	La Ka Ta-3029	Taungoo	Southern Regional Command	
No.(3030) Air Defence Battalion	La Ka Ta-3030	Taung Nyo region, Ottarathiri Township	Nay Pyi Taw Regional Command	
No.(3031) Air Defence Battalion	La Ka Ta-3031	Taung Nyo region, Ottarathiri Township	Nay Pyi Taw Regional Command	
No.(3032) Air Defence Battalion	La Ka Ta-3032	Mt. Seik Phoo, Taungoo	Nay Pyi Taw Regional Command	
No.(3034) Air Defence Battalion	La Ka Ta-3034	Kyauk Hpu	Southern Regional Command	
No.(3036) Air Defence Battalion	La Ka Ta-3036	Unknown	North Western Regional Command	

== Equipment ==
The following is the list of equipment used by air defence battalions of Myanmar.

=== Anti-aircraft guns(AAA) ===
Model	Origin	Year of receipt	Quantity	Notes
Type-87	China	2005-2010	380	Chinese variant of Soviet ZU-23-2 in 25x183mmB calibre.
Type-74	China	2000-2005	24	37 mm AAA.
Type 59	China	2010	Unknown	Anti-aircraft gun (57mm) based on AZP S-60.Received hundreds of this type in 2010.
MR-4	Romania	2000-2005	200	Romanian variant of ZPU-4.
MAA-01 35mm anti-aircraft gun	Myanmar	2012–present (licence built)	10 (as of 2017)	Locally producing with the Chinese assistance. Similar to Chinese Type-90 35 mm twin AA gun.
Type-87 self-propelled anti-aircraft guns	Myanmar	2010-2016	Unknown	Chinese Type-87 25 mm twin AA guns, produced in local with TOT, are fitted on the Dongfeng EQ-2102 trucks. Each anti-aircraft artillery/air defence division comprises three battalions equipped with these AA guns.

=== Man portable air defence systems(MANPADs) ===
Model	Origin	Year of receipt	Quantity	Notes
Igla-1E (SA-16 Gimlet)	Bulgaria; Myanmar	2010–present (licensed production)	2100	Very short-range portable surface-to-air missile. 100 SA-16s received from Bulgaria in 1999. 2000 units of SA-16s producing in locally with TOT between 2004 and 2014.
Igla (SA-18 Grouse)	Russia	Unknown	100	Very short-range portable surface-to-air missile. For infantry use.
Igla-S (SA-24 Grinch)	Russia	2015-2018	400	Very short-range portable surface-to-air missile. For infantry use.
HN-5A	China	1990-1992	200	Possibly being retired.

=== Air defence systems(SAM) ===
Model	Origin	Year of receipt	Quantity	Notes
Long-range air defence system
KF-3	China	2022	unknown	medium to long range air-defence system. Receive from China since 2021
S-200 Dubna (SA-5 Gammon)	Russia	2008	20	Long-range air defence system. North Korea have shipped as many as 20 S-200 launchers to Myanmar. Unclear as to how many units remain in service
Medium-range air defence systems
Pechora-2M (SA-3 Goa)	Russia	2010-2014	8 systems (batteries)	Medium range surface-to-air missile system. Total of 30 launching vehicles.
Kub 2K12M2 (SA-6 "Gainful")	Belarus	2008-2010	24	Medium-range surface to air missile system.
Kub/Buk Kavadrat-M (SA-6 "Gainful")	Belarus	2016	2 batteries	Medium range surface-to-air missile system. Received in 2016.
KS-1A	China	2014-2015	15 batteries (Four KS-1A batteries and the rest are KS-1M batteries)	Medium-range surface-to-air missile system.
KS-1M	Myanmar	2015-2020(Locally producing)	15 batteries (Four KS-1A batteries and the rest are KS-1M batteries)	Medium range surface-to-air missile system. Producing under licence in Myanmar. According to the licence, 12 batteries will be produced by 2020.
S-75M3 Volga-2 (SA-2 Guideline)	Russia	2004 and 2008	48	48 surface-to-air missile launchers and 250 missiles received in 2008.
BAE Dynamics Bloodhound Mk.II	United Kingdom	1999-2000	60 launchers	Supplied by Singapore.Possibly retired from service.
Self-propelled short-range air defence systems
Pantsir-S1 (SA-22 Greyhound)	Russia	On order		Ordered in 2020.
TOR-M1 (SA-15 Gauntlet)	Russia	2004-2008	Unknown	For critical areas.
2K22M Tunguska (SA-19 "Grison")	Russia	2004-2007(38units) and 2019(3units)	41	38 acquired from Russia between 2004 and 2007 and 3 from Ukraine in 2019
MADV	Myanmar	2009-2014(locally produced)	180 (as of 2013)	Air defence variants of locally made Naung Yoe armoured vehicle (utility version). Four Igla mounted MADVs are standard organic AD systems for the Infantry Brigades. Using SA-16 surface-to-air missiles.

== Future equipment ==
- Pantsir S1 - On 22 January 2021 Senior General Min Aung Hlaing signed an agreement which included Pantsir S1 systems, Orlan-10E UAVs and radars during the Russian defence minister Sergey Shoygu visit to Naypyidaw.

== See also ==
- Tatmadaw
- Myanmar Army
- Myanmar Navy
- Myanmar Air Force
- Military intelligence of Myanmar
- Myanmar Directorate of Defence Industries
- Directorate of Medical Services
- List of equipment of the Myanmar Army
- List of equipment in the Myanmar Navy
