= Myeik =

Myeik may refer to:

- Myeik District, a district of the Taninthayi Division of Burma (Myanmar)
  - Myeik Township, a township in the district above
    - Myeik, Myanmar or Mergui, a city in the township above
      - Myeik Airport, an airport serving the city above
- Mergui Archipelago, also known as the Myeik Archipelago, off the coast of the areas above
