= Anthony G. Crutchfield =

Retired U.S. Army lieutenant general, executive of Boeing

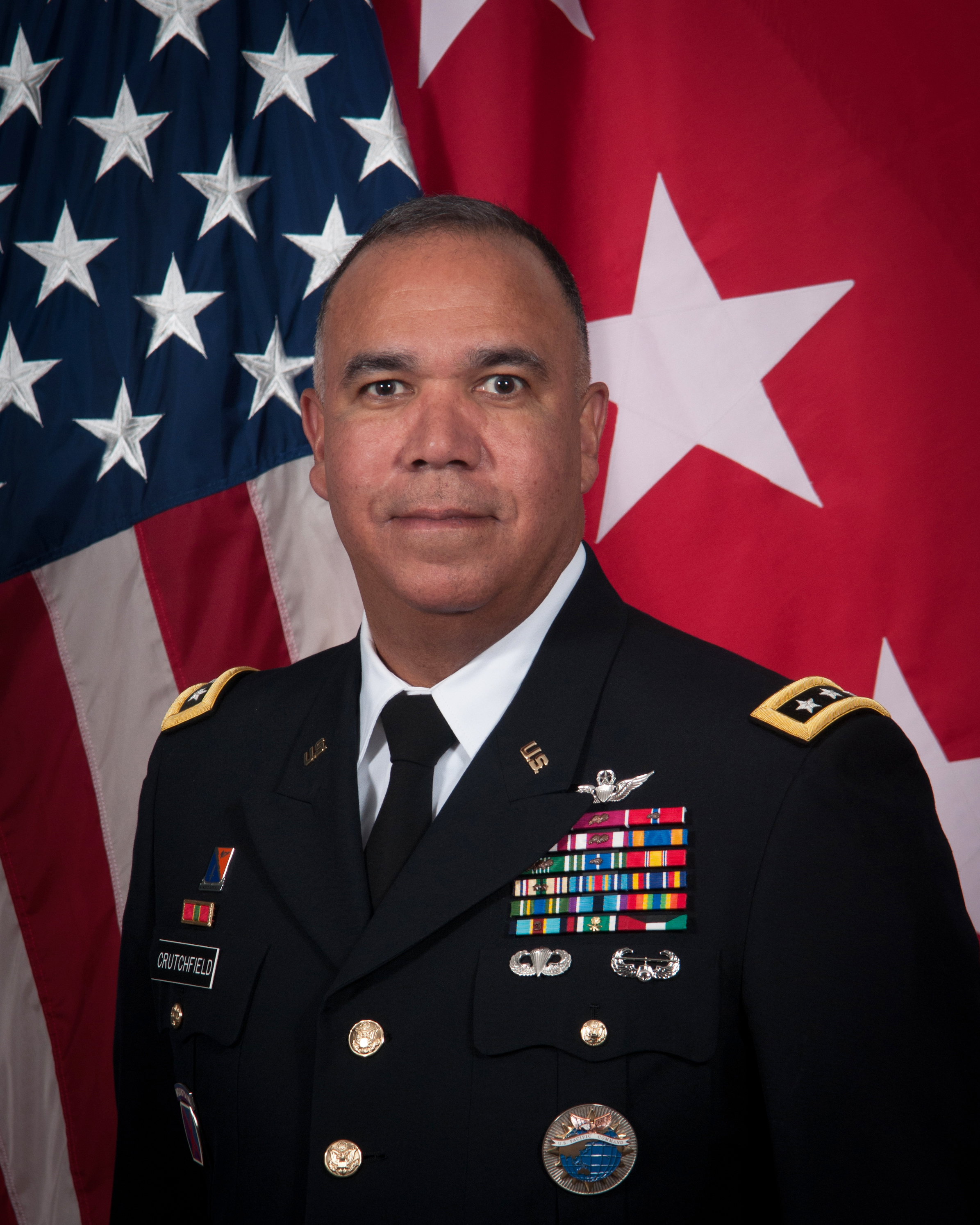
- Born: May 3, 1960 (age 66); Little Rock, Arkansas, U.S.
- Education: Marshall University (BA); Webster University (BA); United States Army War College (MS)
- Spouse: Kimberly "Kimmy" D. Crutchfield (m. 1982)
- Children: 2
- Military career
- Allegiance: United States
- Branch: United States Army
- Service years: 1982–2017
- Rank: Lieutenant General
- Nickname: Tony
- Commands: United States Army Aviation Center of Excellence; Combat Aviation Brigade, 10th Mountain Division; 1st Battalion, 2nd Aviation Regiment
- Conflicts: War in Afghanistan
- Awards: Defense Distinguished Service Medal; Defense Superior Service Medal; Legion of Merit (3); Bronze Star Medal (2)
- Other work: Vice President, Army Systems - Defense, Space and Security Government Operations, Boeing (2017–present)

Anthony Gerard "Tony" Crutchfield (born May 3, 1960) is a retired United States Army lieutenant general who was the deputy commander of United States Pacific Command from 2014 to 2017, having previously served as its chief of staff from 2012 to 2014. An aviation officer by branch, Crutchfield served in several aviation commands throughout his career, culminating in command of the United States Army Aviation Center of Excellence and Fort Rucker from 2010 to 2012. As USAACE commander, he was responsible for the training, doctrine, organizational structure, and future technology development for 90,000 aviation soldiers and over 4,000 aircraft. He retired on April 7, 2017, after 34 years of distinguished service.

He now serves as vice president for Army Systems - Defense, Space and Security Government Operations for The Boeing Company, joining the company in July 2017.

== Military career and education ==
Crutchfield earned his commission in 1982 from the ROTC program at Marshall University. He later earned a M.A. degree in Business Administration from Webster University and a M.S. degree in strategic studies from the Army War College. Since 1986, he has been a pilot of the AH-64 Apache. Units he served with in his early career include 7th Squadron, 17th Cavalry Regiment; 1st Squadron, 6th Cavalry Regiment; and 1st Battalion, 227th Aviation Regiment.

As a field officer, Crutchfield commanded 1st Battalion, 2nd Aviation Regiment from 1998 to 2000 before proceeding to the Army War College to pass the bar for promotion to colonel. He was deployed to Afghanistan as commander of the Combat Aviation Brigade, 10th Mountain Division in 2003, remaining in the region until the brigade returned to Fort Drum in 2004. He then served as executive officer to the Deputy Commanding General and Chief of Staff, U.S. Army Training and Doctrine Command from 2004 to 2007 and then as Deputy Commander and Chief of Staff, U.S. Army Accessions Command from 2007 to 2008.

Brigadier General Crutchfield assumed command of the United States Army Aviation Center of Excellence and Fort Rucker from James O. Barclay III on August 19, 2010, leading the center until August 10, 2012, when he relinquished command to Kevin W. Mangum. He was promoted to major general on February 3, 2011, with his family and former mentor, retired three-star general Thomas F. Metz in attendance.

After two years as chief of staff of United States Pacific Command (USPACOM), Crutchfield was promoted to lieutenant general in a ceremony at Fort Rucker and became deputy commander of PACOM on June 6, 2014.

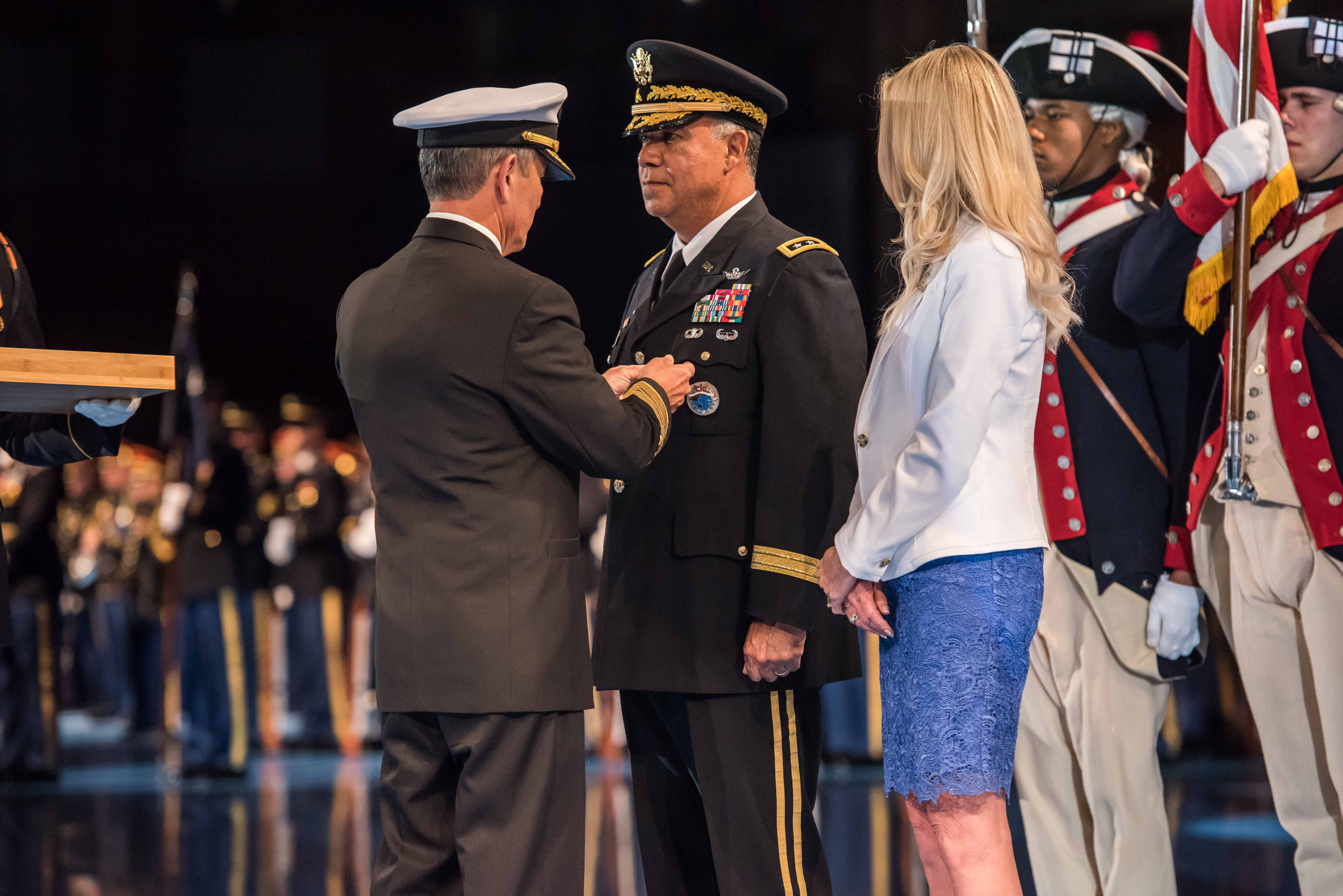
Admiral Harry B. Harris pins the Defense Distinguished Service Medal on Crutchfield's uniform at his retirement ceremony on April 7, 2017.

Crutchfield retired on April 7, 2017, after 34 years of distinguished service. His retirement ceremony was hosted by then Vice Chief of Staff of the United States Army Daniel B. Allyn and PACOM commander Harry B. Harris Jr. at Conmy Hall, Joint Base Myer-Henderson Hall, where he also received the Defense Distinguished Service Medal in recognition of his service to the country.

=== Controversy ===
In 2015, the Inspector General of the Department of Defense launched an investigation amid an allegation that Crutchfield misused government funds for his promotion ceremony to lieutenant general. The allegation was an anonymous report claiming that Crutchfield "invented a way to get a free plane ticket" to travel from PACOM headquarters in Hawaii to Fort Rucker solely for his promotion ceremony. It was found that Crutchfield spent $3,821.61 on a 7-day trip to Alabama en route to Washington, D.C. "to accommodate his preference to hold his promotion ceremony at Fort Rucker" rather than his duty station at Camp H. M. Smith, Hawaii. The trip in question included meetings with several Fort Rucker personnel and plans for a speaking engagement at Maxwell Air Force Base on the same day as the promotion ceremony.

Crutchfield contested the findings, retorting that he was "not guilty of wasting government resources" and conducted official and "bona fide" activities on the 7-day trip. The Department of the Army eventually cleared Crutchfield of wrongdoing and allowed him to remain as PACOM deputy commander.

== Post-retirement ==
Crutchfield joined Boeing as their vice president for army systems in July 2017. As VP - Army Systems, he is the company's senior liaison to the United States Army and is in charge of leading the development and execution of a strategic campus plan with United States Military Academy at West Point, including STEM (science, technology, engineering, and math) and diversity outreach programs.

== Personal life ==
Crutchfield has been married to Kimberly “Kimmy” Crutchfield since 1982 and has 2 children and 3 grandchildren. He lives in New Kent, Virginia with his wife and two dogs.

Crutchfield is an avid Washington Nationals and Washington Capitals fan.

== Awards and decorations ==
Army Master Aviator Badge
Basic Parachutist Badge
Air Assault Badge
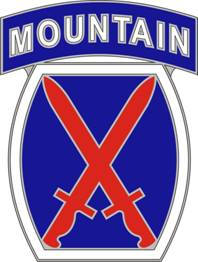
10th Mountain Division Combat Service Identification Badge
229th Aviation Regiment Distinctive Unit Insignia
Defense Distinguished Service Medal
Defense Superior Service Medal
Legion of Merit with two oak leaf clusters
Bronze Star Medal with oak leaf cluster
Defense Meritorious Service Medal
Meritorious Service Medal with two oak leaf clusters
Air Medal
Army Commendation Medal with three oak leaf clusters
Army Achievement Medal with oak leaf cluster
Army Achievement Medal with oak leaf cluster
Army Superior Unit Award
Southwest Asia Service Medal with two service stars
Global War on Terrorism Expeditionary Medal
Global War on Terrorism Service Medal
Korea Defense Service Medal
Humanitarian Service Medal
Army Service Ribbon
Overseas Service Ribbon with bronze award numeral 3
Kuwait Liberation Medal (Saudi Arabia)
Kuwait Liberation Medal (Kuwait)
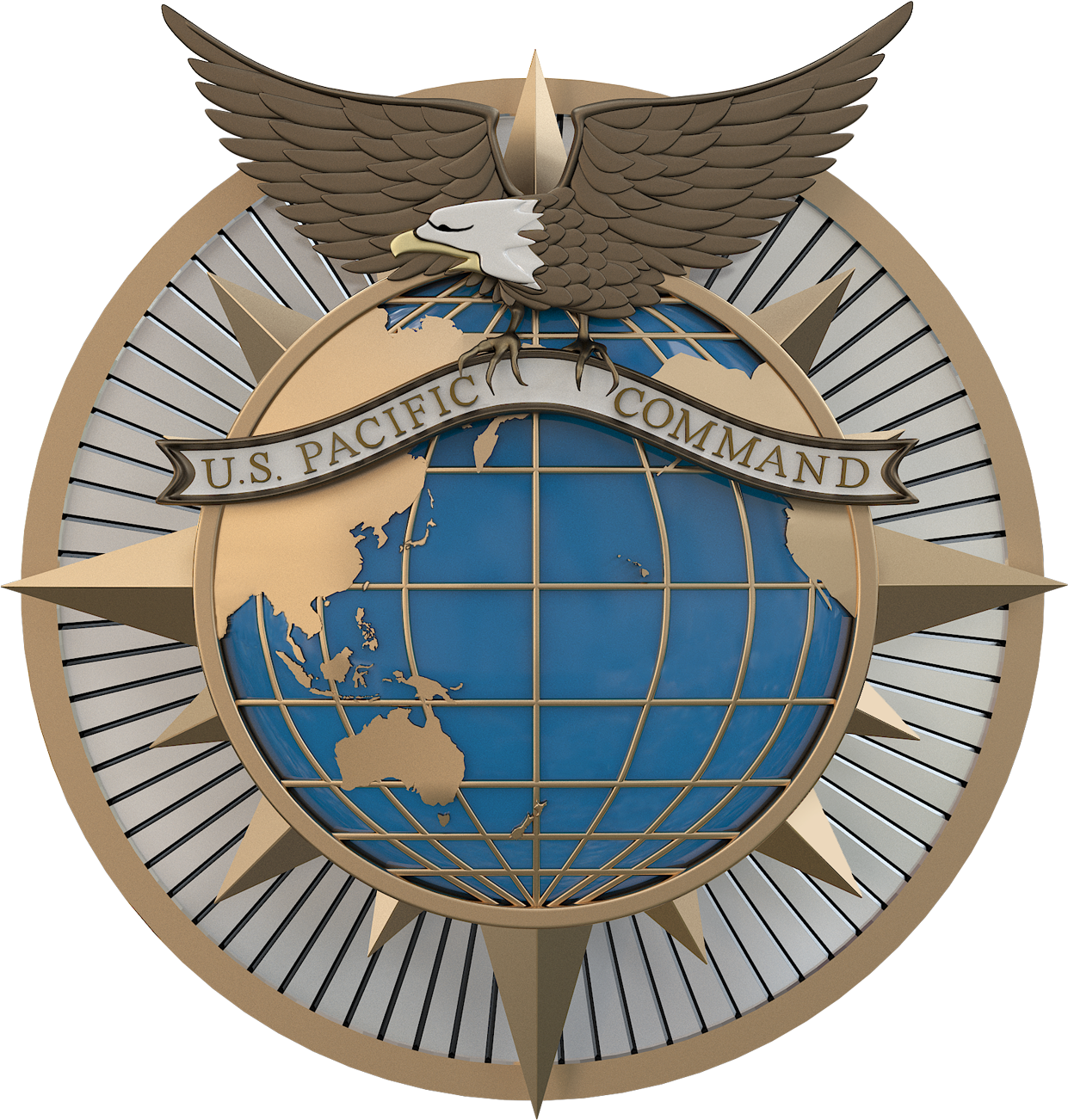
United States Pacific Command badge

Military offices
Preceded by James O. Barclay III	Commanding General of the United States Army Aviation Center of Excellence; 2010–2012	Succeeded by Kevin W. Mangum
Preceded by Robin M. Watters	Chief of Staff of the United States Pacific Command; 2012–2014	Succeeded by John L. Dolan
Preceded by Thomas L. Conant	Deputy Commander of the United States Pacific Command; 2014–2017	Succeeded by Bryan P. Fenton
