= Hswar =

Hswar ဆွာမြို့
- City
- Location in Burma
- Coordinates: 19°15′52″N 96°17′35″E
- Country: Myanmar
- Division: Bago Region
- Time zone: UTC+6.30 (MST)

Swar also Hswar is the capital city of Myanmar's Bago Region and located at Taungoo District, Yedashe Township.

== History ==
The city of Swar was formerly known as the Kanbar Myint village.
