= Kevin W. Mangum =

United States Army lieutenant general (born 1960)

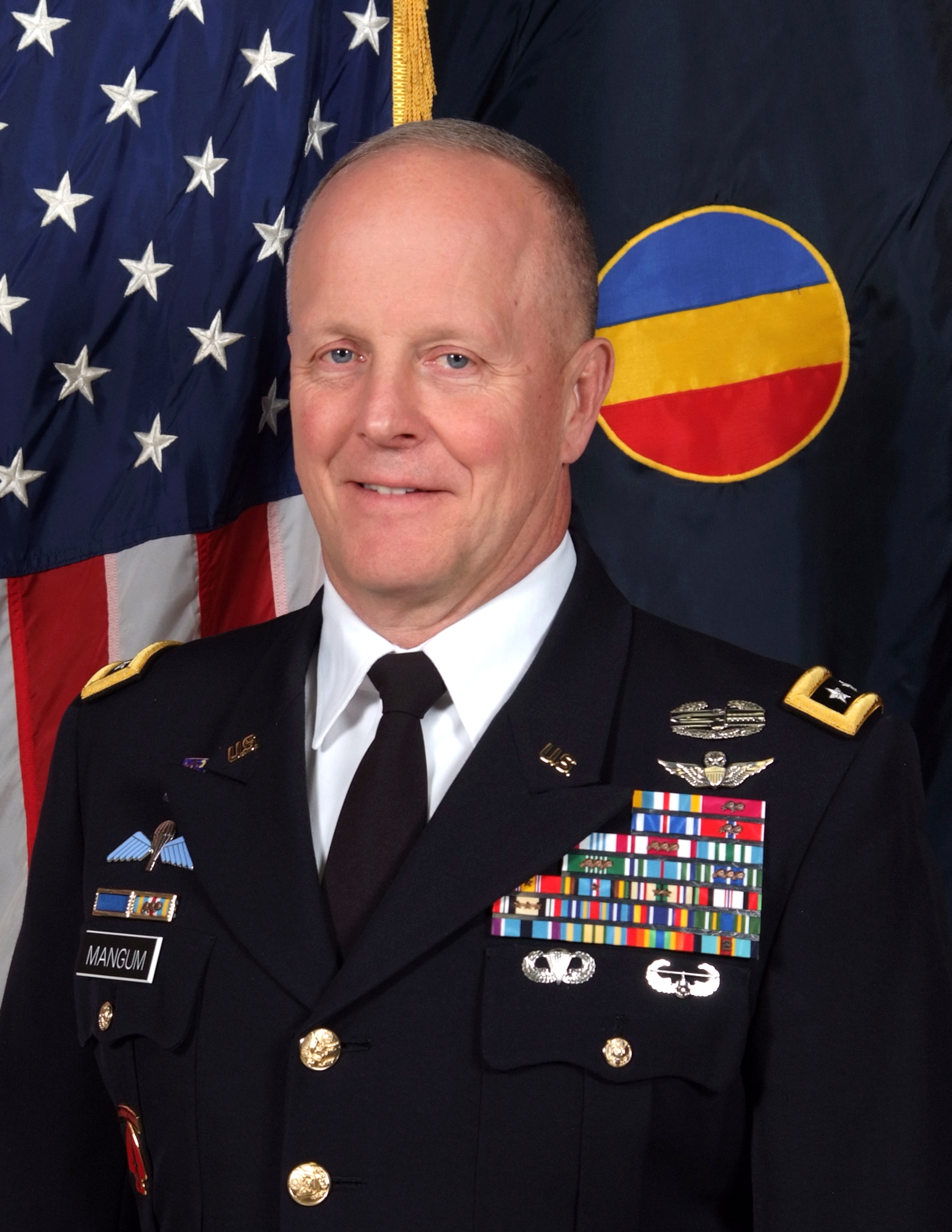
- Born: October 6, 1960 (age 65); Virginia, United States
- Allegiance: United States of America
- Branch: United States Army
- Service years: 1982–2017
- Rank: Lieutenant general
- Commands: Deputy Commander/Chief of Staff, TRADOC; United States Army Aviation Center of Excellence

Kevin Wayne Mangum (born October 6, 1960) is a retired United States Army lieutenant general who last served as deputy commander and chief of staff, United States Army Training and Doctrine Command (TRADOC). He is a 1982 graduate of the United States Military Academy. He previously commanded the United States Army Aviation Center of Excellence.
