= Tin Maung Win =

Burmese politician

Member of the Amyotha Hluttaw
- In office 3 February 2016 – 1 February 2021
- Constituency: Sagaing Region № 10

Member-elect of Pyithu Hluttaw (1990)
- Preceded by: Constituency established
- Succeeded by: Constituency abolished
- Constituency: Mawlaik Township
- Majority: 11,249 (64%)

Personal details
- Born: 21 February 1955 (age 71) Kindat, Myanmar
- Party: National League for Democracy
- Spouse: Tin Mie Mie Khaing
- Children: Dimo Win
- Parent(s): Nyo Oo (father); Than Kyi (mother)
- Education: ten grade

Tin Maung Win (Burmese: တင်မောင်ဝင်း; born 21 February 1955) is a Burmese politician who served as an Amyotha Hluttaw MP for Sagaing Region No. 10 constituency. He is a member of the National League for Democracy.

== Early life and career ==
Tin Maung Win was born on 12 February 1955 in Kindat Township, Myanmar. He studied at Kindat Middle School and Mawlaik High School. He worked as a Clerk at the Mawlaik Township Trade Co-operative from 1975 to 1980 and ran a private electronic repair shop from 1983 to 2013.

He had served as a Committee member of 8888 uprising at Mawlaik Township in 1988. In 1989, he served as a chairman of township NLD party organizer. He contested the Mawlaik Township constituency and won a Pyithu Hluttaw seat in the 1990 Burmese general election, winning a majority of 11,249 (64% of the votes), but was never allowed to assume his seat. And then, he had served as the chairman of District Assembly Election Commission in 2012. He also served as the Chairman of District Executive and as a representative of Central Conference in 2013.

== Political career ==
He is a member of the National League for Democracy. In the 2015 Myanmar general election, he was elected as an Amyotha Hluttaw member of parliament and elected representative from Sagaing Region No. 10 parliamentary constituency.
