= Myeik Airport =

- IATA: MGZ; ICAO: VYME

Summary
- Airport type: Public
- Serves: Myeik
- Location: Myeik, Myanmar
- Built: 12 May 1987
- Elevation AMSL: 18.9 m / 62 ft
- Coordinates: 12°26′23″N 098°37′17″E

Map
- Location of airport in Myanmar

Runways
Direction	Length		Surface
Direction	m	ft	Surface
18/36	2,681	8,795	Asphalt

Myeik Airport is an airport in Myeik, which is the largest city in Tanintharyi Region of Myanmar. It serves as a domestic airport for the region, with one asphalt runway that is 5,321 feet long. (IATA: MGZ, ICAO: VYME).

== Airlines and destinations ==
Airlines	Destinations
Mingalar Aviation Services	Yangon
Myanmar National Airlines	Kawthaung, Yangon
