= Shwedagon Pagoda =

Buddhist pagoda in Yangon, Myanmar

- ရွှေတိဂုံစေတီတော်
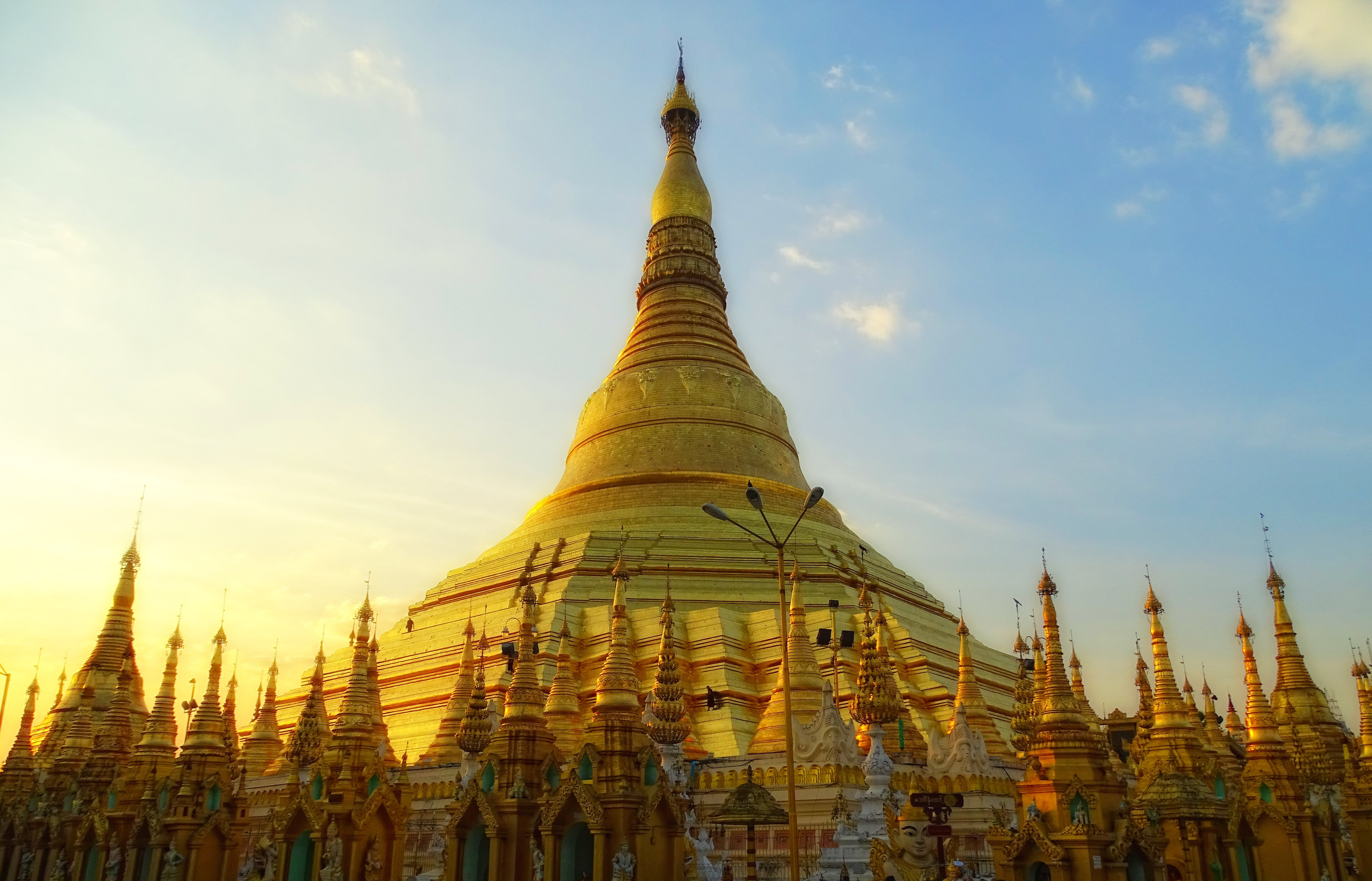
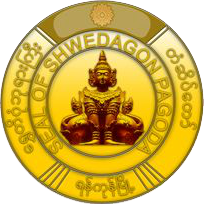
- Seal of the Shwedagon Pagoda

- Location within Myanmar

Religion
- Affiliation: Buddhism
- Sect: Theravada Buddhism
- Region: Yangon Region
- Festival: Shwedagon Pagoda Festival (Tabaung)
- Governing body: The Board of Trustees of Shwedagon Pagoda
- Status: Active

Location
- Municipality: Yangon
- Country: Myanmar
- Coordinates: 16°47′54″N 96°08′59″E

Architecture
- Completed: 1362–63 (or earlier); 1462; 1775

Specifications
- Height (max): 99 m (325 ft)
- Spire height: 112 m (367 ft)

Website
- www.shwedagonpagoda.org.mm

Yangon City Landmark

The Shwedagon Pagoda (Burmese: ရွှေတိဂုံဘုရား, MLCTS: shwe ti. gon bhu. ra:, IPA: [ʃwèdəɡòʊɰ̃ pʰəjá]; Mon: ကျာ်ဒဂုၚ်), officially named Shwedagon Zedi Daw (Burmese: ရွှေတိဂုံစေတီတော်, [ʃwèdəɡòʊɰ̃ zèdìdɔ̀], lit. 'Golden Dagon Pagoda,'), and also known as the Great Dagon Pagoda and the Golden Pagoda, Kyaik Dagon is a gilded stupa located in Yangon, Myanmar.

The Shwedagon is the most sacred Buddhist pagoda in Myanmar, as it is believed to contain relics of the four previous Buddhas of the present kalpa. These relics include the staff of Kakusandha, the water filter of Koṇāgamana, a piece of the robe of Kassapa, and eight strands of hair from the head of Gautama.

Built on the 51-metre-high (167 ft) Singuttara Hill, the 112 m (367 ft) tall pagoda stands 170 m (560 ft) above sea level, (Note: The pagoda's pinnacle height (to the tip of its hti) is 112 m (367 ft) tall per (UNESCO 2018), and is built on the Singuttara Hill, which is 51 m (167 ft) tall per "History of the Shwedagon"., and 58 m (190 ft) tall above sea level per "The Shwedagon Pagoda, Yangon". 14 January 2015.) and dominates the Yangon skyline. Yangon's zoning regulations, which cap the maximum height of buildings at 127 metres (417 feet) above sea level (75% of the pagoda's sea level height), ensure the Shwedagon's prominence in the city's skyline.

== History ==
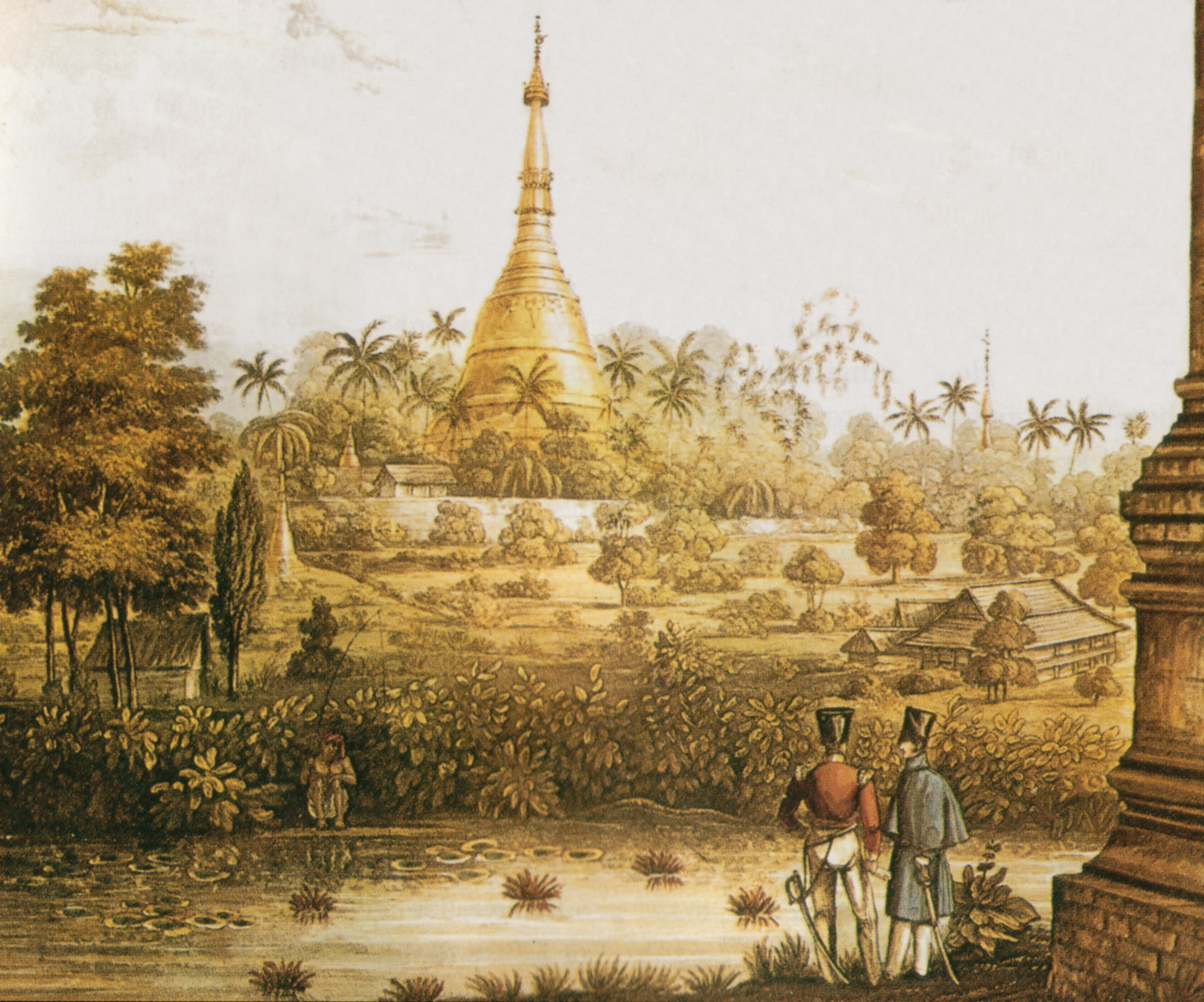
View of the Great Dagon Pagoda in 1825, from a print after Lieutenant Joseph Moore of Her Majesty's 89th Regiment, published in a portfolio of 18 views in 1825–1826 lithography

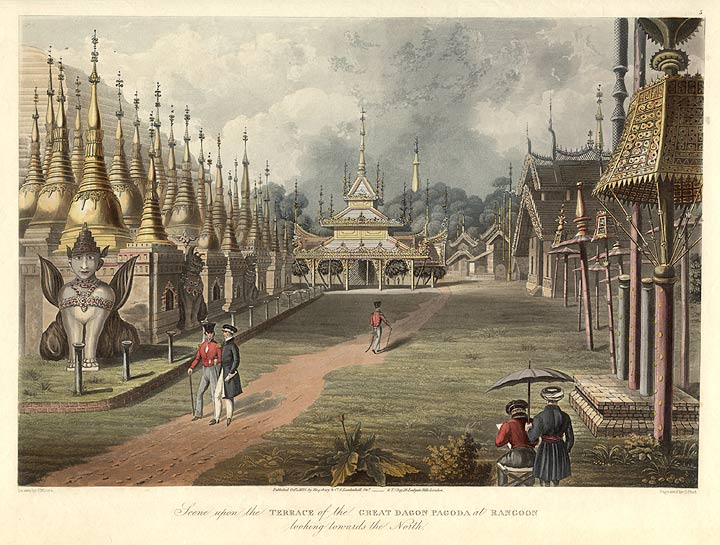
Scene upon the terrace of the Great Dagon Pagoda, 1824–1826

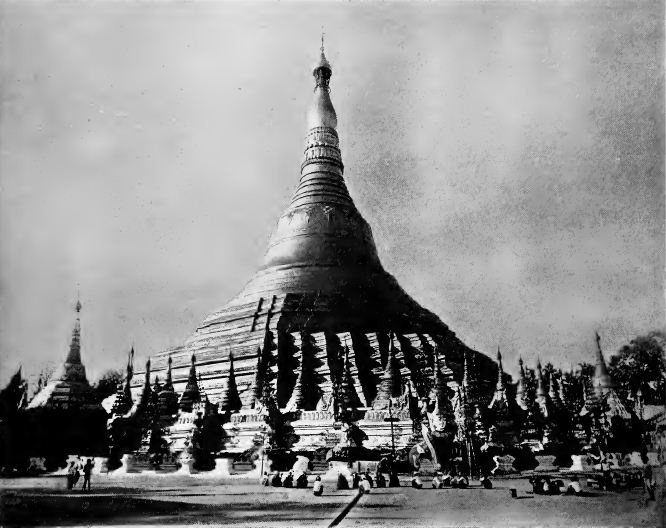
Shwedagon Pagoda in the 1890s

Legend holds that the Shwedagon Pagoda was constructed more than 2,500 years ago — while the Buddha was still alive — which would make it the oldest Buddhist stupa in the world. According to the Buddhavaṃsa, two merchants from Ukkalājanapada named Tapussa and Bhallika were passing through Bodh Gaya when they encountered the Buddha. The Buddha, who was at that time enjoying the bliss of his newly attained Buddhahood as he sat under a rājāyatana tree, accepted their offering of rice cake and honey and taught them some of the dharma in return. In so doing, they became the first lay disciples to take refuge in the teachings of the Buddha. The Buddha also gave eight strands of his hair to the merchants and gave them instructions on how to construct a stupa in which to enshrine these hair relics. The merchants presented the eight strands of hair to King Okkalapa of Dagon, who enshrined the strands along with some relics of the three preceding Buddhas (Kakusandha, Koṇāgamana, and Kassapa) in a stupa on the Singuttara Hill in present-day Myanmar.

The first mention of the pagoda in the royal chronicles dates only to 1362/63 CE (724 ME) when King Binnya U of Martaban–Hanthawaddy raised the pagoda to 18 m (59 ft). Contemporary inscriptional evidence, the Shwedagon Pagoda Inscriptions from the reign of King Dhammazedi of Hanthawaddy (r. 1471–1492), shows a list of repairs of the pagoda going back to 1436. In particular, Queen Shin Saw Pu (r. 1454–1471) raised its height to 40 m (130 ft), and gilded the new structure. By the beginning of the 16th century, Shwedagon Pagoda had become the most famous Buddhist pilgrimage site in Burma.

A series of earthquakes during the following centuries caused damage. The worst damage was caused by a 1768 earthquake that brought down the top of the stupa, but King Hsinbyushin in 1775 raised it to its current height of 99 m (325 ft) (without counting the height of the hti (crown umbrella)). A new hti was donated by King Mindon in 1871, nearly two decades after the annexation of Lower Burma by the British. A moderate earthquake in October 1970 left the shaft of the hti out of alignment; extensive repairs were needed to rectify the problem.

The Shwedagon Pagoda Festival, which is the largest pagoda festival in the country, begins during the new moon of the month of Tabaung in the traditional Burmese calendar and continues until the full moon. The pagoda is on the Yangon City Heritage List.

== Design ==
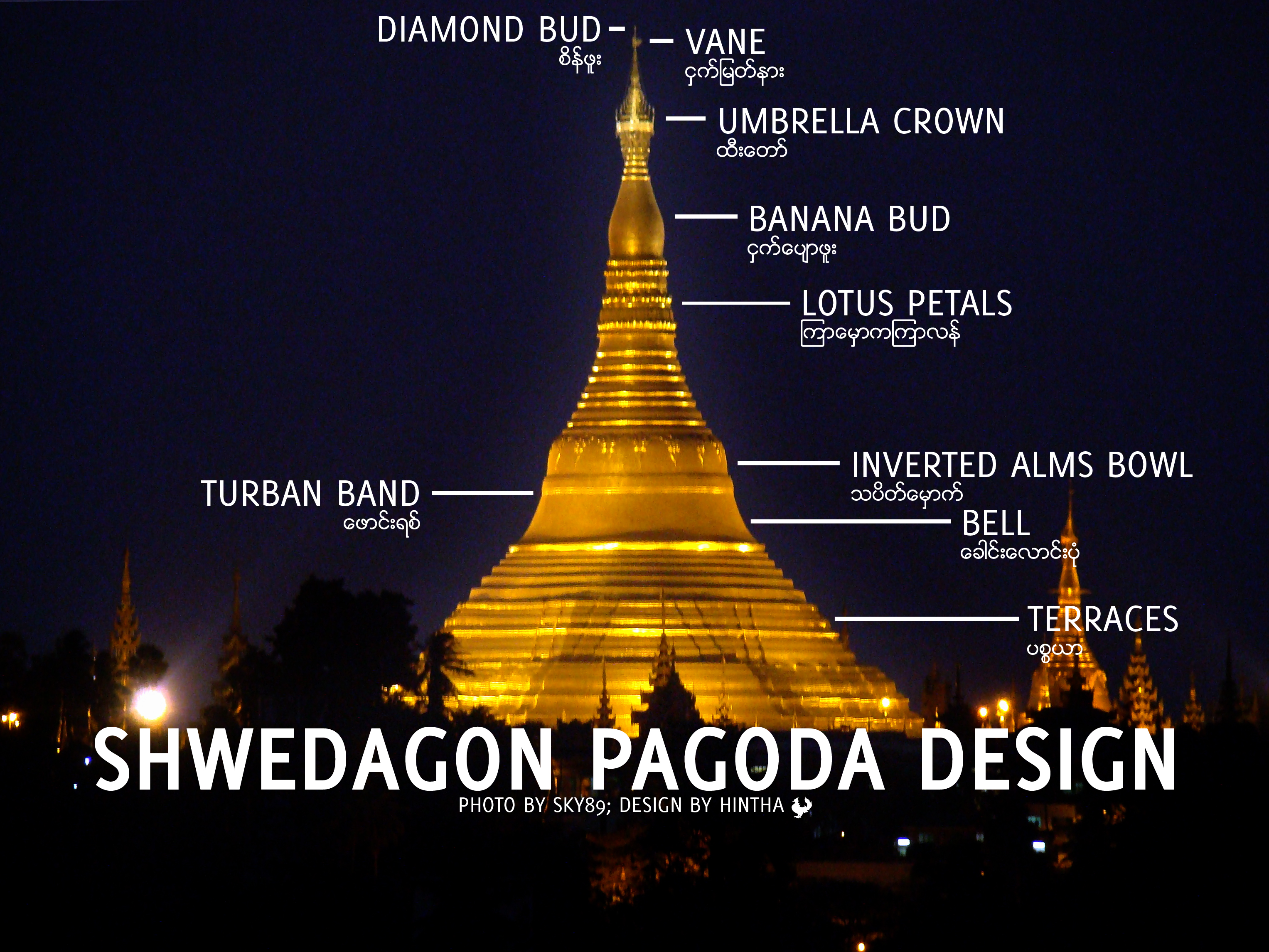
Diagram showing the various architectural features that comprise the design of the Shwedagon Pagoda

The stupa's plinth is made of bricks covered with gold plates. Above the base are terraces that only monks and other males can access. Next is the bell-shaped part of the stupa. Above that is the turban, then the inverted almsbowl, inverted and upright lotus petals, the banana bud and then the umbrella crown. The crown is tipped with 5,448 diamonds and 2,317 rubies. Immediately before the diamond bud is a flag-shaped vane. The very top—the diamond bud—is tipped with a 76 carat (15 g) diamond.

The gold seen on the stupa is made of genuine gold plates, covering the brick structure and attached by traditional rivets. People all over the country, as well as successive monarchs, starting from Queen Shin Saw Pu, have donated gold to the pagoda to maintain it.

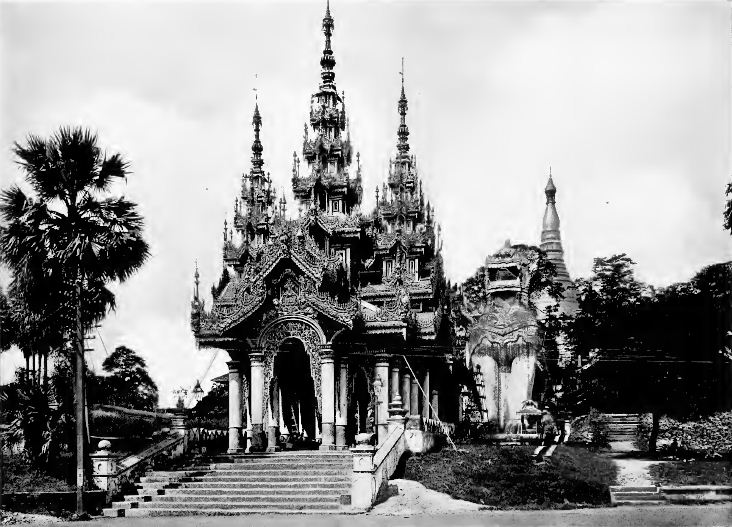
Southern entrance in 1890s

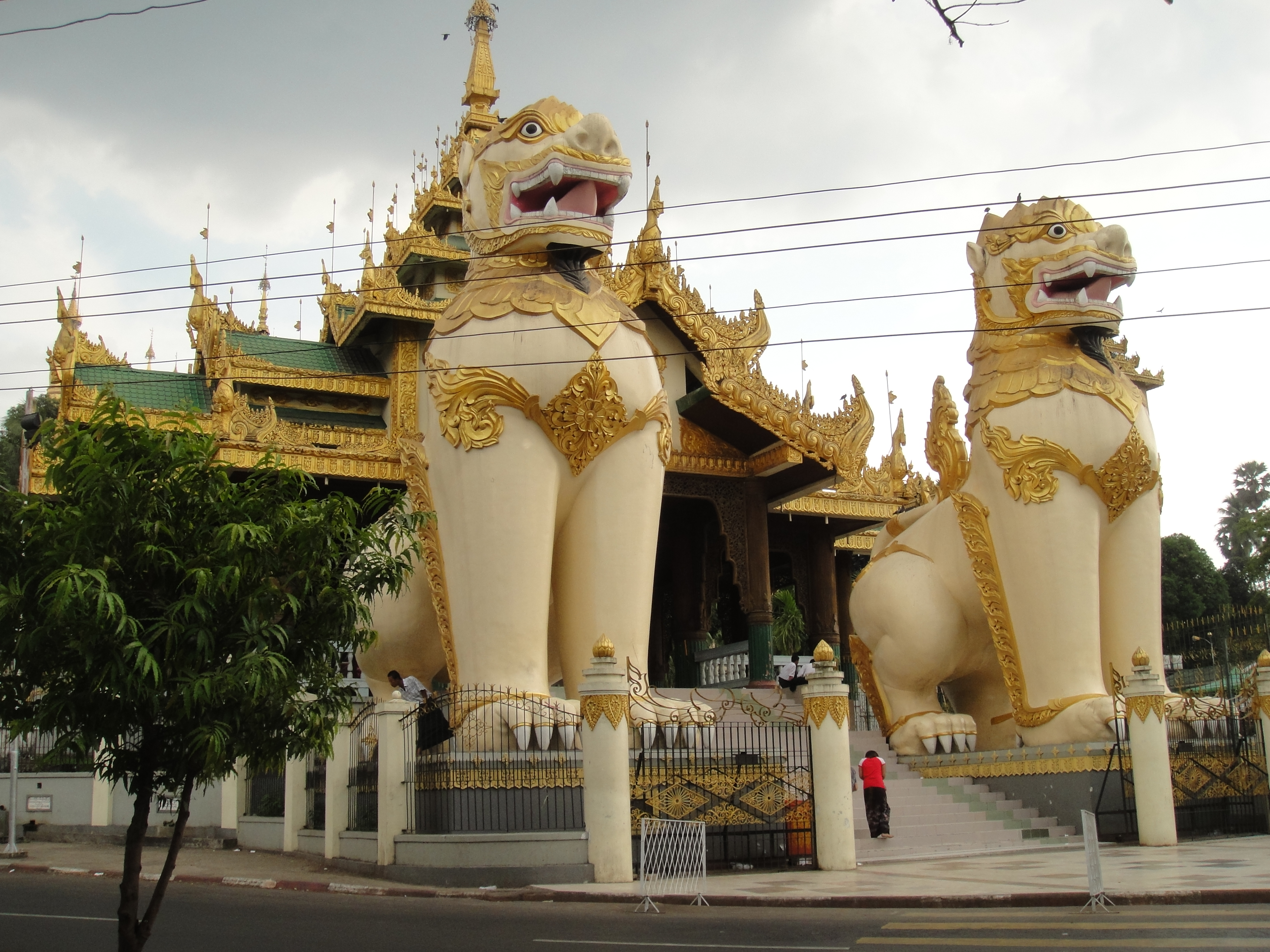
A pair of leogryphs guarding the entrance to the walkway leading up Singuttara Hill to Shwedagon Pagoda

There are four entrances, each leading up a flight of steps to the platform on Singuttara Hill. A pair of giant leogryphs guards each entrance. The eastern and southern approaches have vendors selling books, good luck charms, images of the Buddha, candles, gold leaf, incense sticks, prayer flags, streamers, miniature umbrellas and flowers.

It is customary to circumnavigate Buddhist stupas in a clockwise direction. In accordance with this principle, one may begin at the eastern directional shrine, which houses a statue of Kakusandha, the first Buddha of the present kalpa. Next, at the southern directional shrine, is a statue of the second Buddha, Koṇāgamana. Next, at the western directional shrine, is that of the third Buddha, Kassapa. Finally, at the northern directional shrine, is that of the fourth Buddha, Gautama.

== Rituals ==
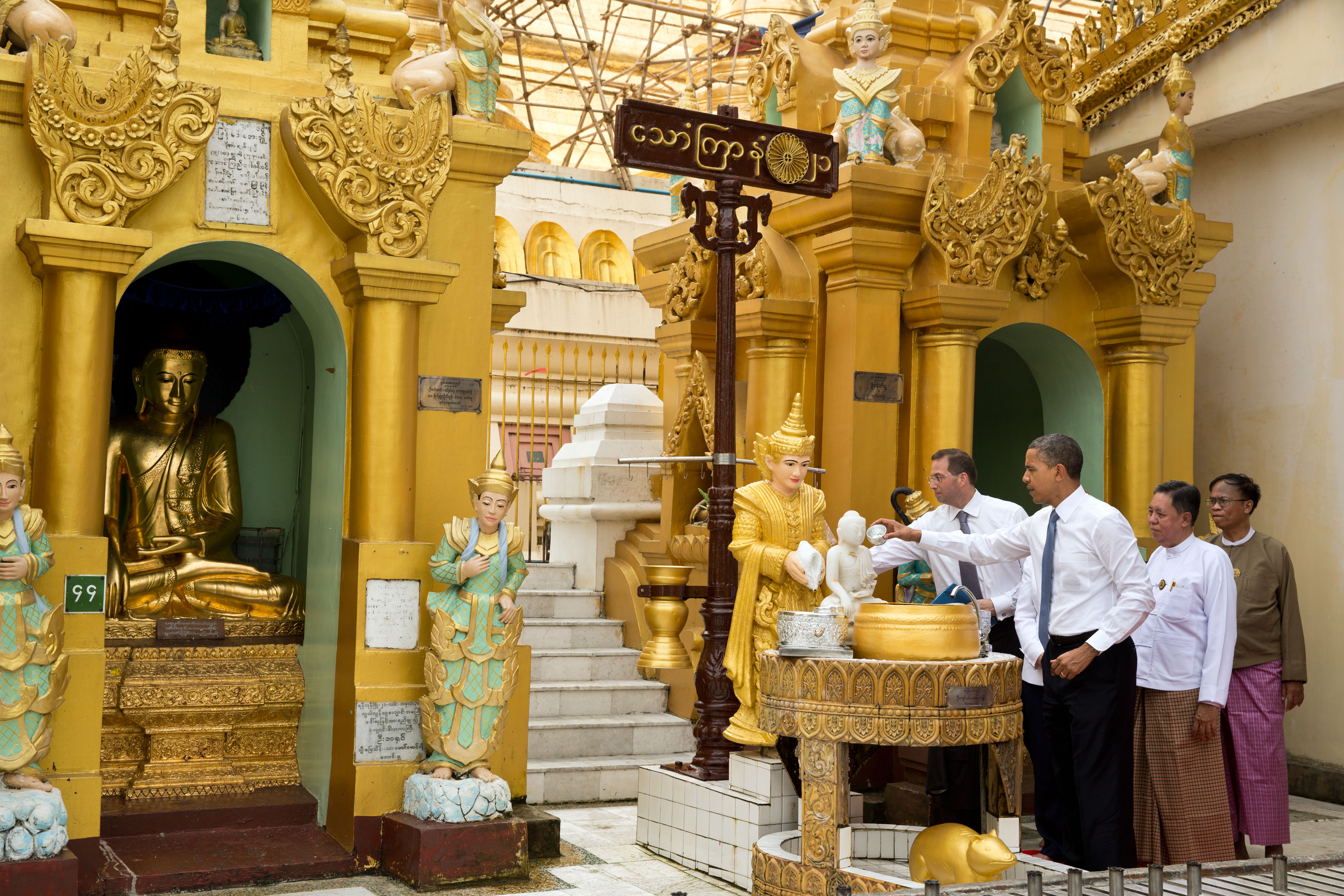
US President Barack Obama performing a Blessing Ritual by pouring water over the Buddha statue at the Friday planetary post; Obama was born on a Friday.

Though most Burmese are Theravada Buddhists, many also follow practices which originated in Hindu astrology. The Burmese astrology recognizes the seven planets of astrology — the Sun, Moon, Mercury, Venus, Mars, Jupiter, and Saturn, and in addition, two other planets, Rahu and Ketu. All the names of the planets are borrowed from Hindu astrology, but the Burmese Rahu and Ketu are different from the Hindu Rahu and Ketu. The Burmese consider them to be distinct and separate planets, whereas Hindu astrology considers them to be either the Dragon's Head and Tails, or Ascending and Descending Nodes. To the Burmese, Ketu is the king of all planets. As in many other languages, the Burmese name the seven days of their week after the seven planets, but Burmese astrology recognizes an eight-day week, with Wednesday being divided into two days: until 6:00 p.m. it is Wednesday, but from 6:00 p.m. until midnight it is Rahu's day.

It is important for Burmese Buddhists to know on which day of the week they were born, as this determines their planetary post. There are eight planetary posts, as Wednesday is split in two (a.m. and p.m.). They are marked by animals that represent the day — garuda for Sunday, tiger for Monday, lion for Tuesday, tusked elephant for Wednesday morning, tuskless elephant for Wednesday afternoon, mouse for Thursday, guinea pig for Friday and nāga for Saturday. Each planetary post has a Buddha image and devotees offer flowers and prayer flags and pour water on the image with a prayer and a wish called a Blessing Ritual. At the base of the post behind the image is a guardian angel, and underneath the image is the animal representing that particular day. The plinth of the stupa is octagonal and also surrounded by eight small shrines (one for each planetary post). It is customary to circumnavigate Buddhist stupas in a clockwise direction. Many devotees perform a blessing ritual by pouring water at their planetary post.

The pilgrim, on his way up the steps of the pagoda, buys flowers, candles, coloured flags and streamers. These are to be placed at the stupa in a symbolic act of giving, an important aspect of Buddhist teaching. There are donation boxes located in various places around the pagoda to receive voluntary offerings which may be given to the pagoda for general purposes. In December 2017, foreigners were charged a Ks.10,000/- (approx. US$7) entrance fee.

== Shwedagon in literature ==
Rudyard Kipling described his 1889 visit to Shwedagon Pagoda ten years later in From Sea to Sea and Other Sketches, Letters of Travel

Then, a golden mystery upheaved itself on the horizon, a beautiful winking wonder that blazed in the sun, of a shape that was neither Muslim dome nor Hindu temple-spire. It stood upon a green knoll, and below it were lines of warehouses, sheds, and mills. Under what new god, thought I, are we irrepressible English sitting now?

'There's the old Shway Dagon' (pronounced Dagone), said my companion. 'Confound it!' But it was not a thing to be sworn at. It explained in the first place why we took Rangoon, and in the second why we pushed on to see what more of rich or rare the land held. Up till that sight my uninstructed eyes could not see that the land differed much in appearance from the Sunderbuns, but the golden dome said: 'This is Burma, and it will be quite unlike any land you know about.' 'It's a famous old shrine o' sorts,' said my companion, 'and now the Tounghoo-Mandalay line is open, pilgrims are flocking down by the thousand to see it. It lost its big gold top—'thing that they call a 'htee—in an earthquake: that's why it's all hidden by bamboo-work for a third of its height. You should see it when it's all uncovered. They're regilding it now.'

== War and invasion ==
The 18th Foot and 80th Foot storming the pagoda on 12 April 1852

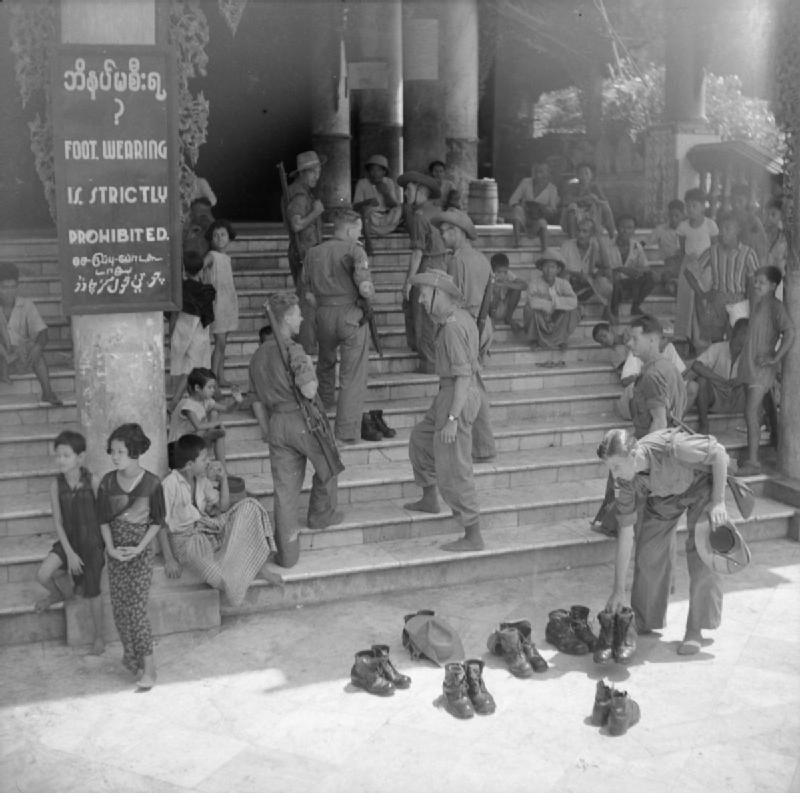
British soldiers remove their shoes while visiting Shwedagon Pagoda during World War II

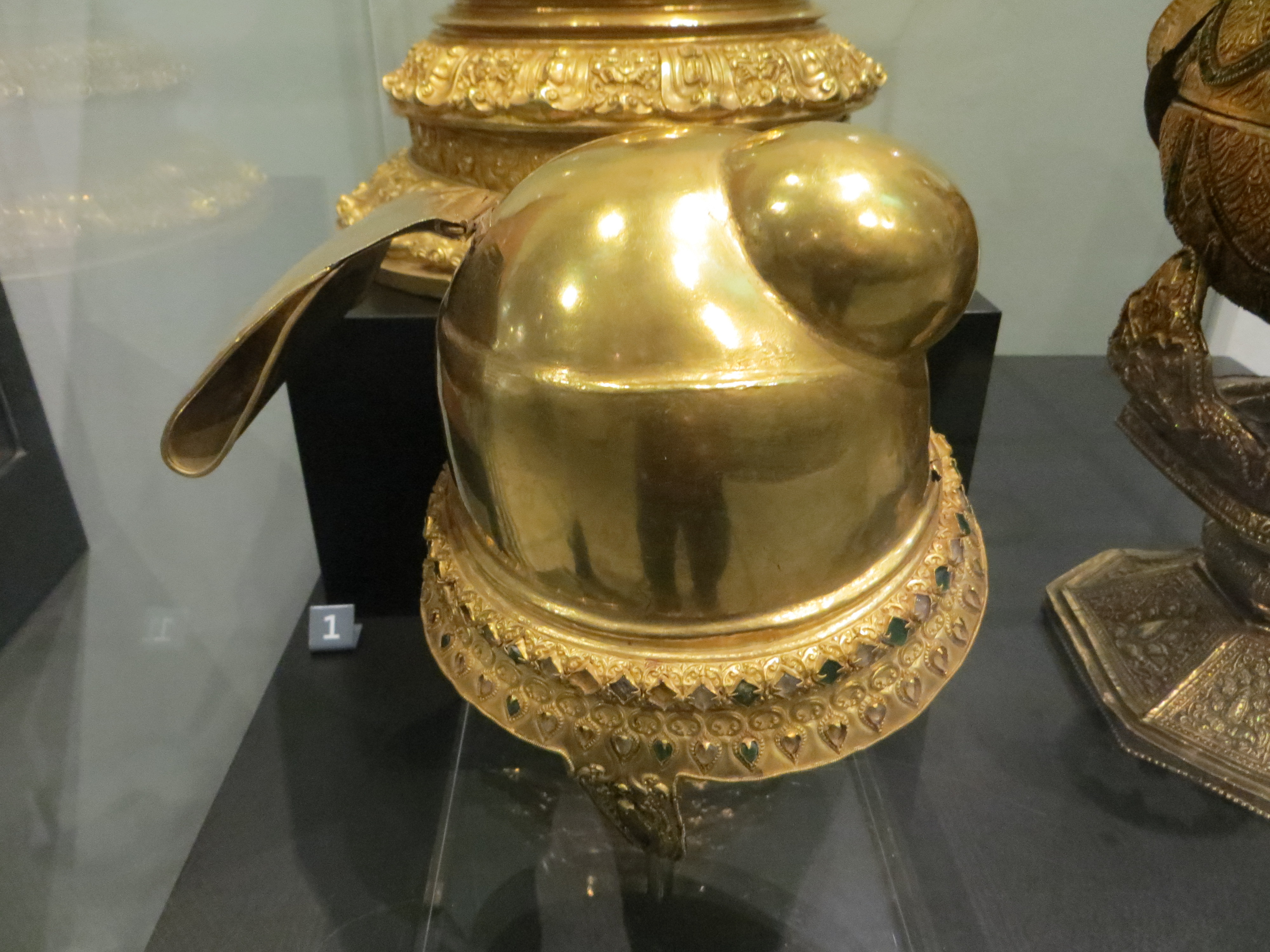
Gold headdress belonging to Queen Shin Sawbu. It was excavated by labourers when building barracks on the site of an old pagoda east of the Shwedagon Pagoda in 1855 and is now in the Victoria and Albert Museum

In 1608 the Portuguese adventurer Filipe de Brito e Nicote, known as Nga Zinka to the Burmese, plundered the Shwedagon Pagoda. His men took the 300-ton Great Bell of Dhammazedi, donated in 1485 by the Mon King Dhammazedi. De Brito's intention was to melt the bell down to make cannons, but it fell into the Bago River when he was carrying it across. To this date, it has not been recovered.

Two centuries later, the British landed on May 11, 1824, during the First Anglo-Burmese War. They immediately seized and occupied the Shwedagon Pagoda and used it as a fortress until they left two years later. There was pillaging and vandalism, and one officer's excuse for digging a tunnel into the depths of the stupa was to find out if it could be used as a gunpowder magazine. The Maha Gandha (lit. great sweet sound) Bell, a 23-ton bronze bell cast in 1779 and donated by King Singu and popularly known as the Singu Min Bell, was carried off with the intention to ship it to Kolkata. It met the same fate as the Dhammazedi Bell and fell into the river. When the British failed in their attempts to recover it, the people offered to help provided it could be restored to the stupa. The British, thinking it would be in vain, agreed, upon which divers went in to tie hundreds of bamboo poles underneath the bell and floated it to the surface. There has been much confusion over this bell and the 42-ton Tharrawaddy Min Bell donated in 1841 by Tharrawaddy Min along with 20 kg of gold plating; this massive ornate bell hangs in its pavilion in the northeast corner of the stupa. A different but less plausible version of the account of the Singu Min Bell was given by Lt. J.E. Alexander in 1827. This bell can be seen hung in another pavilion in the northwest of the pagoda platform.

The Second Anglo-Burmese War saw the British re-occupation of the Shwedagon in April 1852, only this time the stupa was to remain under their military control for 77 years, until 1929, although the people were given access to the Paya.

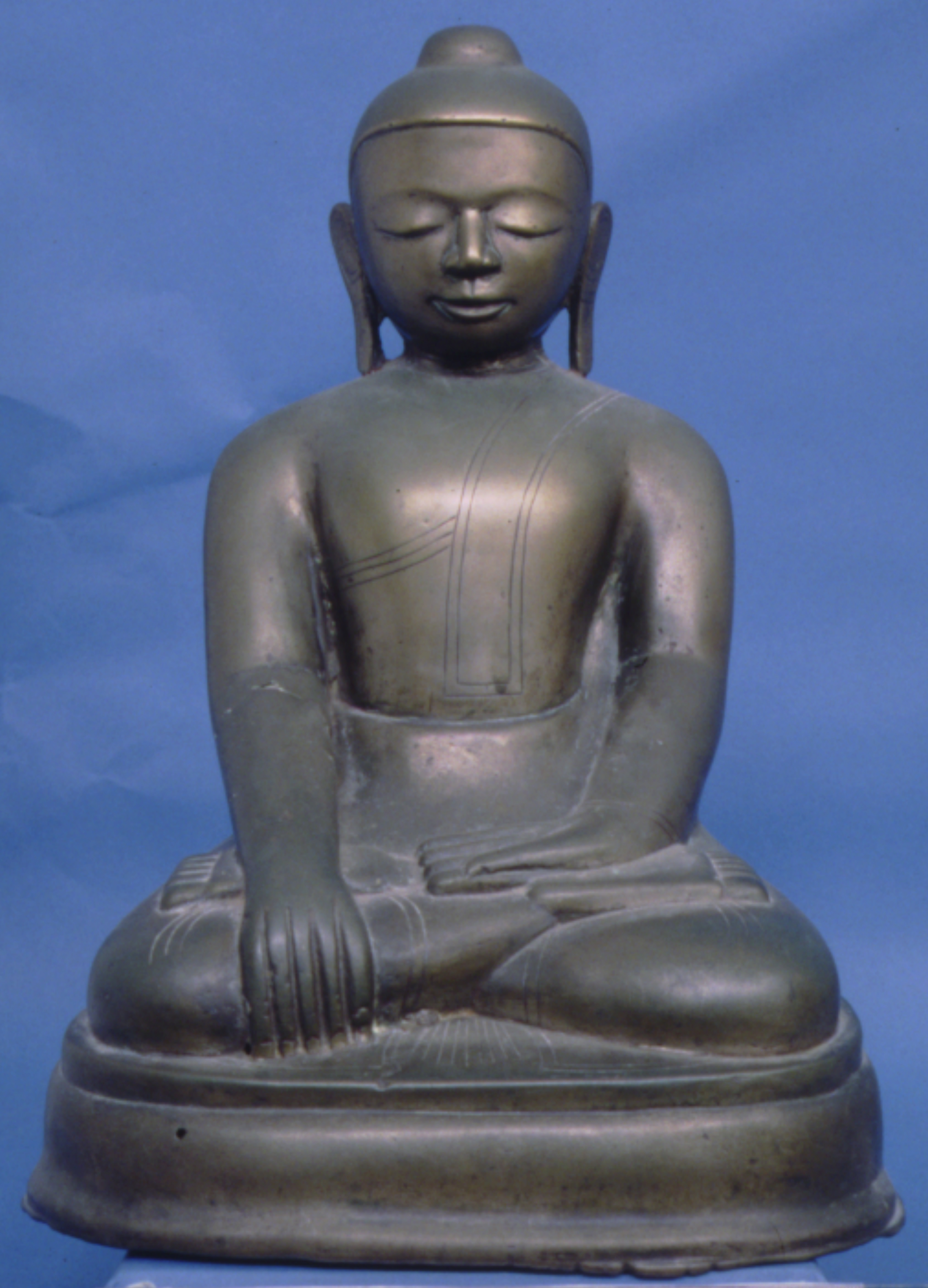
Buddha statue looted from the pagoda in 1852. Now in the Auckland War Memorial Museum

During the British occupation and fortification of the Pagoda, Lord Maung Htaw Lay, the most prominent Mon-Burmese in British Burma, successfully prevented the British Army from looting of the treasures; he eventually restored the Pagoda to its former glory and status with the financial help from the British rulers. This extract is from the book “A Twentieth Century Burmese Matriarch” written by his great-great-great grand daughter Khin Thida.

After retirement he moved back to Rangoon area still in Burmese hands but very soon destined for the next annexation. He was again caught up in war but this time he had a great fortune of supporting religious ventures and gaining tremendous merit. His good karma and leadership abilities led him to the task of saving the great Shwedagon Pagoda from imminent destruction and sacking of its treasures by British troops in the second Anglo-Burmese War.

The great Buddhist shrine had been fortified by the British troops in the 1824 war and was again used as a fort in 1852. When he heard of the fortification and sacking of the shrine, he sent a letter of appeal directly to the British India Office in London stopping the desecration. He then obtained compensation from the British Commissioner of Burma Mr. Phayre and began the renovations of the Pagoda in 1855 with public support and donations.

He became the founding trustee of the Shwedagon Pagoda Trust and he was awarded the title of KSM by the British Raj for his public service. He died at the age of 95, bequeathing his prestige and high repute to his large family and descendants.

== Political area ==
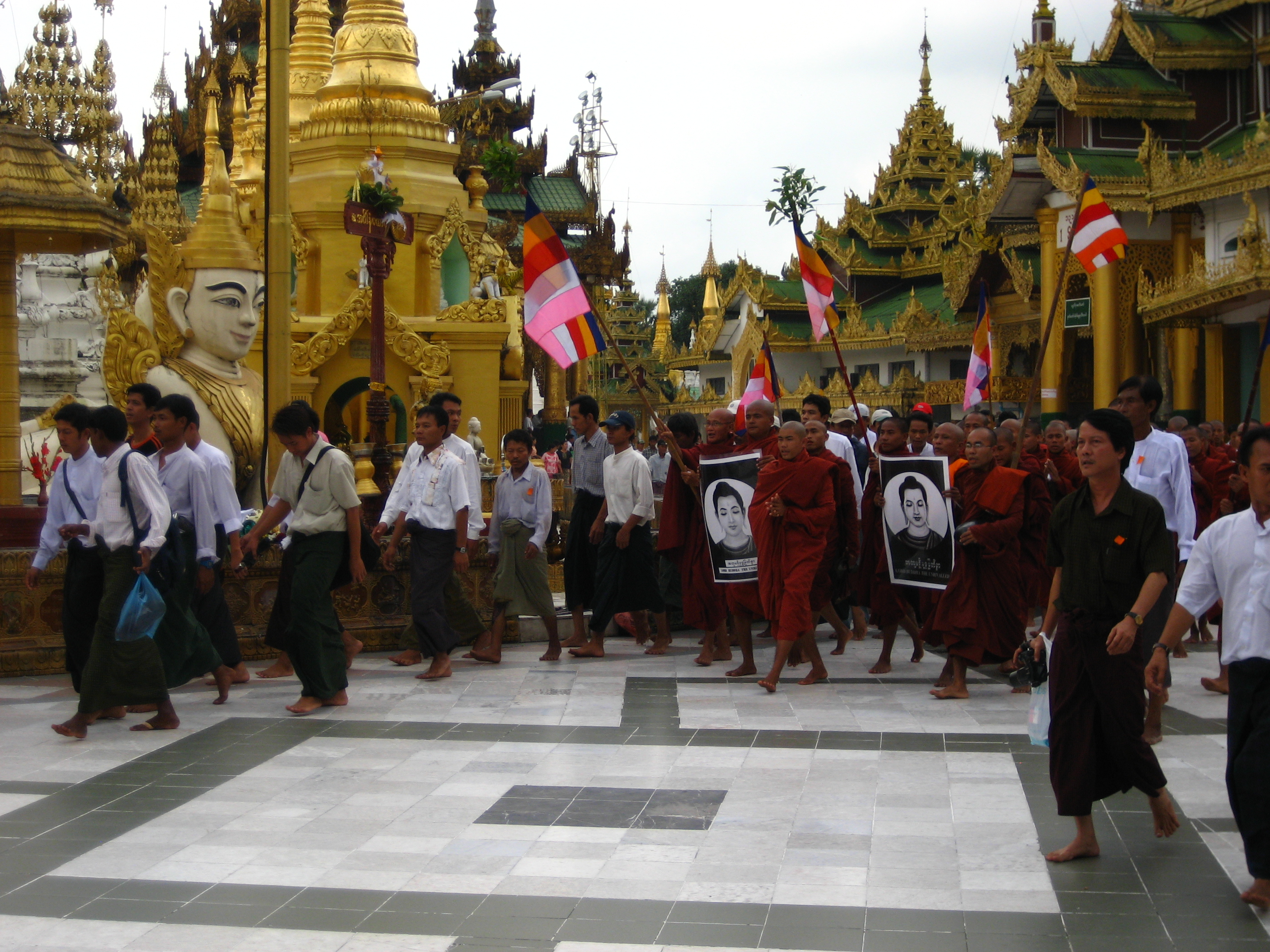
Protesters at Shwedagon Pagoda in Yangon

In 1920, students from Burma's only university met at a pavilion on the southwest corner of the Shwedagon pagoda and planned a protest strike against the new University Act which they believed would only benefit the elite and perpetuate colonial rule. This place is now commemorated by a memorial. The result of the ensuing University Boycott was the establishment of "national schools" financed and run by the Burmese people; this day has been commemorated as the Burmese National Day since. During the second university students strike in history of 1936, the terraces of the Shwedagon were again where the student strikers camped out.

In 1938, oilfield workers on strike hiked all the way from the oilfields of Chauk and Yenangyaung in central Burma to Rangoon to establish a strike camp at the Shwedagon Pagoda. This strike, supported by the public as well as students and came to be known as the '1300 Revolution' after the Burmese calendar year, was broken up by the police who, in their boots whereas Burmese would remove their shoes in pagoda precincts, raided the strike camps on the pagoda.

The "shoe question" on the pagoda has always been a sensitive issue to the Burmese people since colonial times. The Burmese people had always removed shoes at all Buddhist pagodas. Hiram Cox, the British envoy to the Burmese Court, in 1796, observed the tradition by not visiting the pagoda rather than take off his shoes. However, after the annexation of lower Burma, European visitors as well as troops posted at the pagoda openly flouted the tradition. U Dhammaloka publicly confronted a police officer over wearing shoes at the pagoda in 1902. It was not until 1919 that the British authorities finally issued a regulation prohibiting footwear in the precincts of the pagoda. However, they put in an exception that employees of the government on official business were allowed footwear. The regulation and its exception clause moved to stir up the people and played a role in the beginnings of the nationalist movement. Today, no footwear or socks are allowed on the pagoda.

In January 1946, General Aung San addressed a mass meeting at the stupa, demanding "independence now" from the British with a thinly veiled threat of a general strike and uprising. Forty-two years later, on August 26, 1988, his daughter, Aung San Suu Kyi addressed another mass meeting of 500,000 people at the stupa, demanding democracy from the military regime and calling the 8888 Uprising the second struggle for independence.

=== September 2007 protests ===
In September 2007, during nationwide demonstrations against the military regime and its recently enacted price increases, protesting monks were denied access to the pagoda for several days before the government finally relented and permitted them in.

On September 24, 2007, 20,000 bhikkhus and thilashins (the largest protest in 20 years) marched at the Shwedagon Pagoda, Yangon. On Monday, 30,000 people led by 15,000 monks marched from Shwedagon Pagoda and past the offices of Aung San Suu Kyi's opposition National League for Democracy (NLD) party. Comedian Zarganar and star Kyaw Thu brought food and water to the monks. On Saturday, monks marched to greet Aung San Suu Kyi, who is under house arrest. On Sunday, about 150 nuns joined the marchers. On September 25, 2007, 2,000 monks and supporters defied threats from Myanmar's junta. They marched to Yangon streets at Shwedagon Pagoda amid army trucks and the warning of Brigadier-General Myint Maung not to violate Buddhist "rules and regulations."

On September 26, 2007, clashes between security forces and thousands of protesters led by Buddhist monks in Myanmar have left at least five protesters dead by Myanmar security forces, according to opposition reports, in an anticipated crackdown. Earlier in the day security authorities used tear gas, warning shots and force to break up a peaceful demonstration by scores of monks gathered around the Shwedagon Pagoda.

The web site reports that protesting "monks were beaten and bundled into waiting army trucks," adding about 50 monks were arrested and taken to undisclosed locations. In addition, the opposition said "soldiers with assault rifles have sealed off sacred Buddhist monasteries ... as well as other flashpoints of anti-government protests." It reports that the violent crackdown came as about 100 monks defied a ban by venturing into a cordoned-off area around the Shwedagon Pagoda, Myanmar's holiest Buddhist shrine.

It says that authorities ordered the crowd to disperse, but witnesses said the monks sat down and began praying, defying the military government's ban on public assembly. Security forces at the pagoda "struck out at demonstrators" and attacked "several hundred other monks and supporters," the opposition web site detailed. Monks were ushered away by authorities and loaded into waiting trucks while several hundred onlookers watched, witnesses said. Some managed to escape and headed towards the Sule Pagoda, a Buddhist monument and landmark located in Yangon's city centre.

== Replicas ==
- Uppatasanti Pagoda—located in Naypyidaw, the capital of Myanmar—is a replica of Shwedagon Pagoda. Completed in 2009, it is similar in many aspects to Shwedagon Pagoda, but its height is 30 cm (12 in) less than that of Shwedagon.
- Another replica of Shwedagon Pagoda, 46.8 m (154 ft) in height, was constructed at Lumbini Natural Park in Berastagi, North Sumatra, Indonesia. Completed in 2010, the construction materials for this pagoda, were imported from Myanmar.
- Global Vipassana Pagoda, 29 m (95 ft) high and opened in 2009, located in Mumbai, India
- Tachileik Shwedagon Pagoda near the Golden Triangle in Myanmar.
- In 2019, a monastery was inaugurated in Chisago City, Minnesota, United States modeled after the Shwedagon Pagoda.
Uppatasanti Pagoda in Naypyidaw, Myanmar

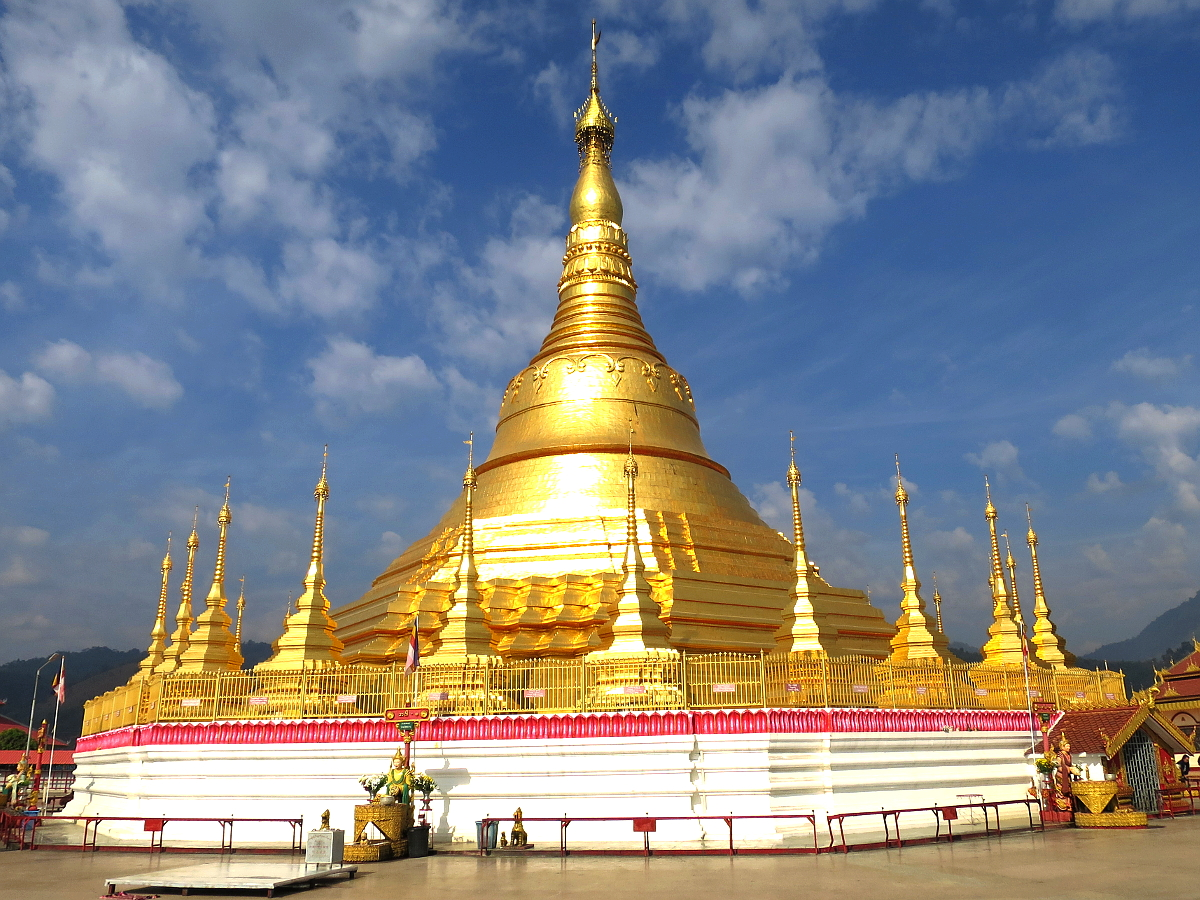
Replica in Tachileik

== Gallery ==
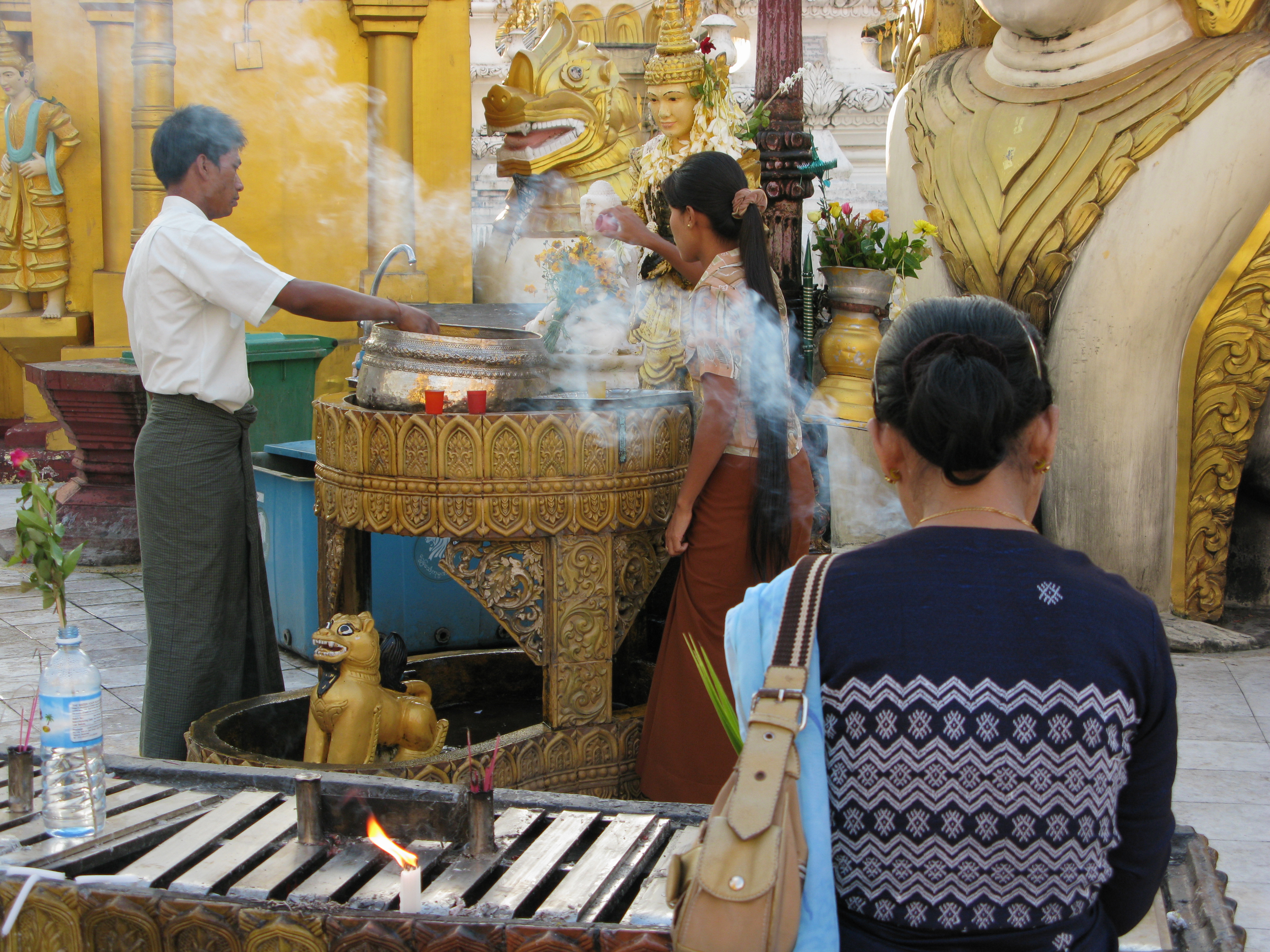
Rituals

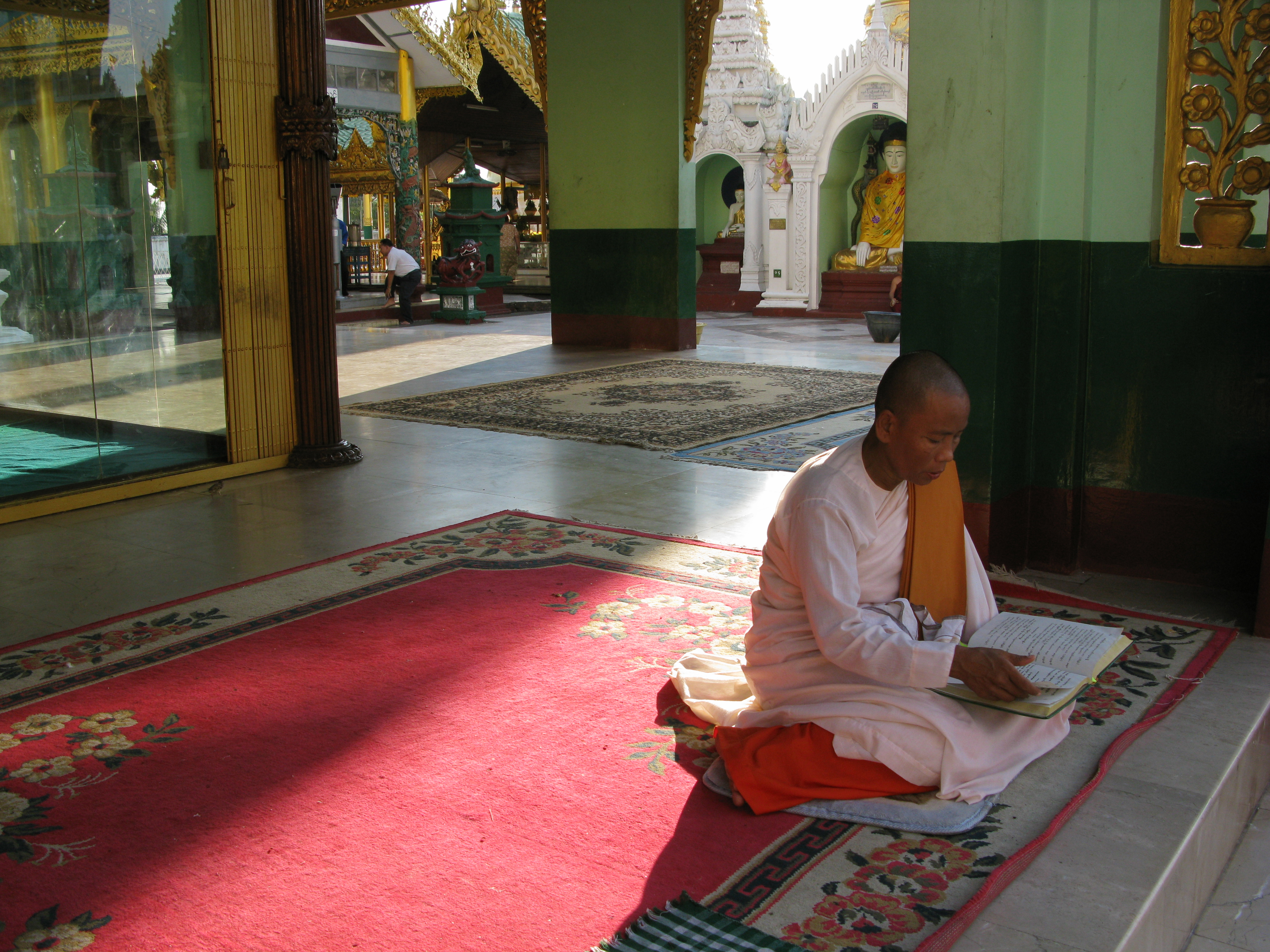
Prayer

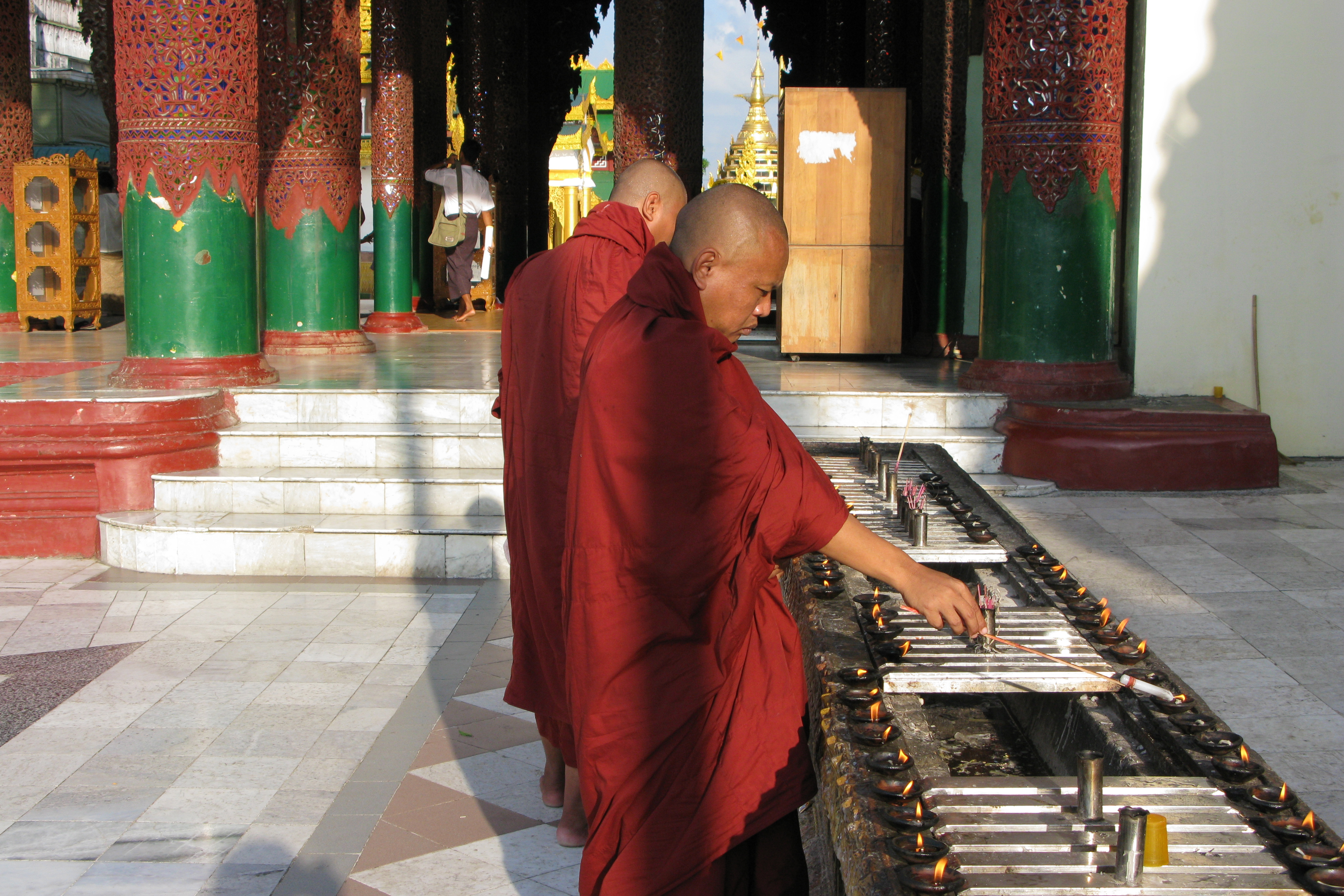
Monks

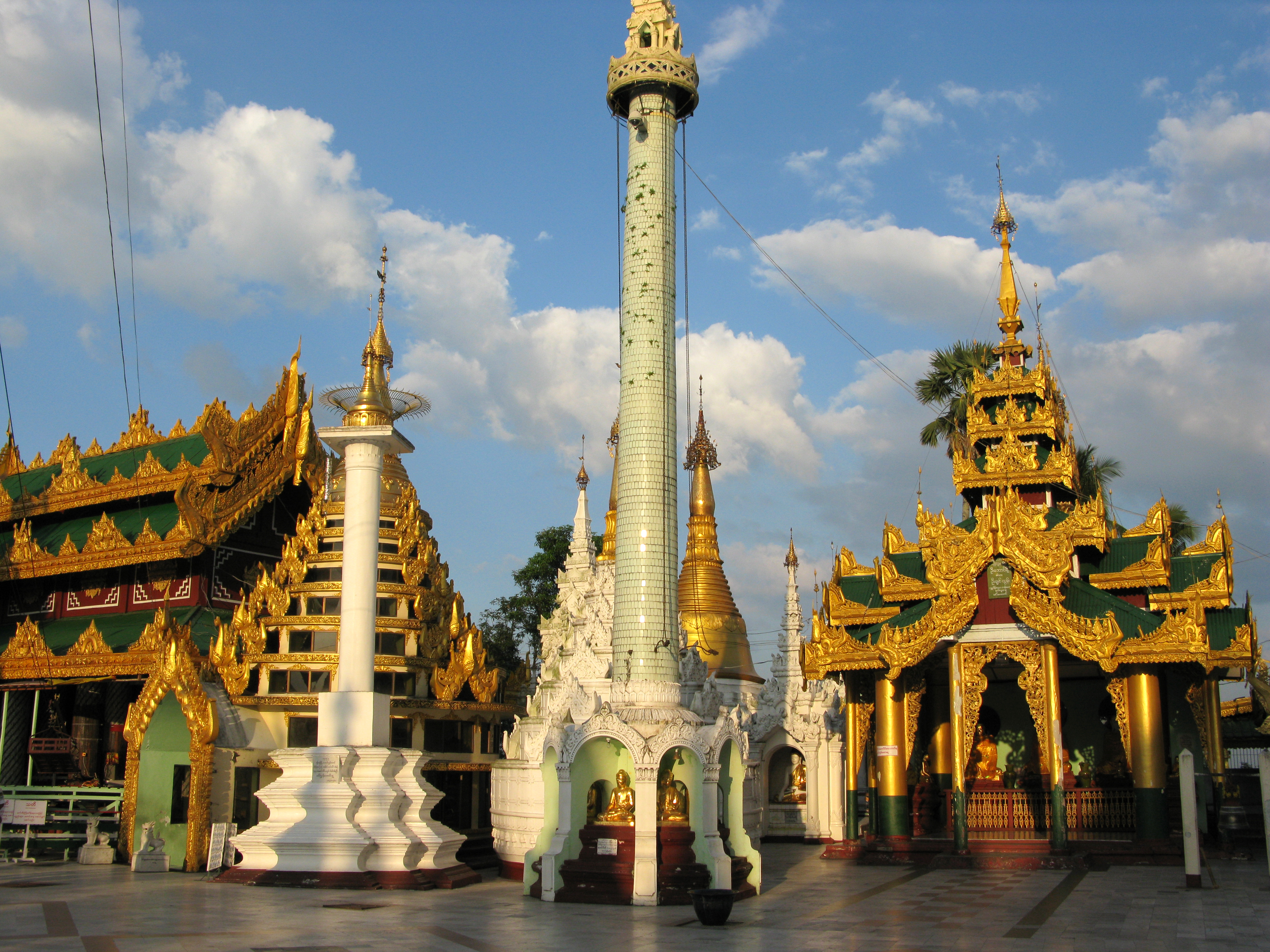
Shrines

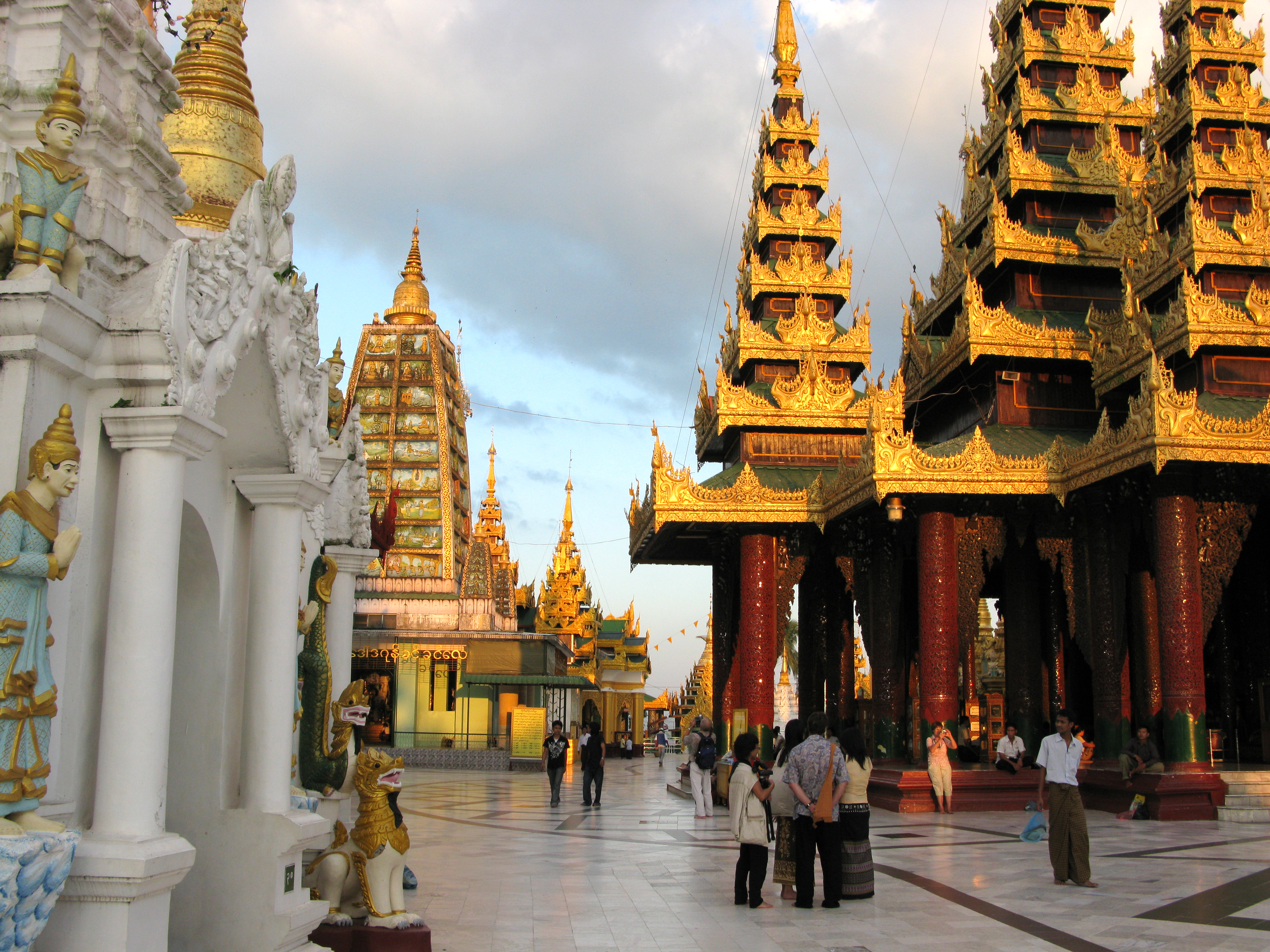
Shrines

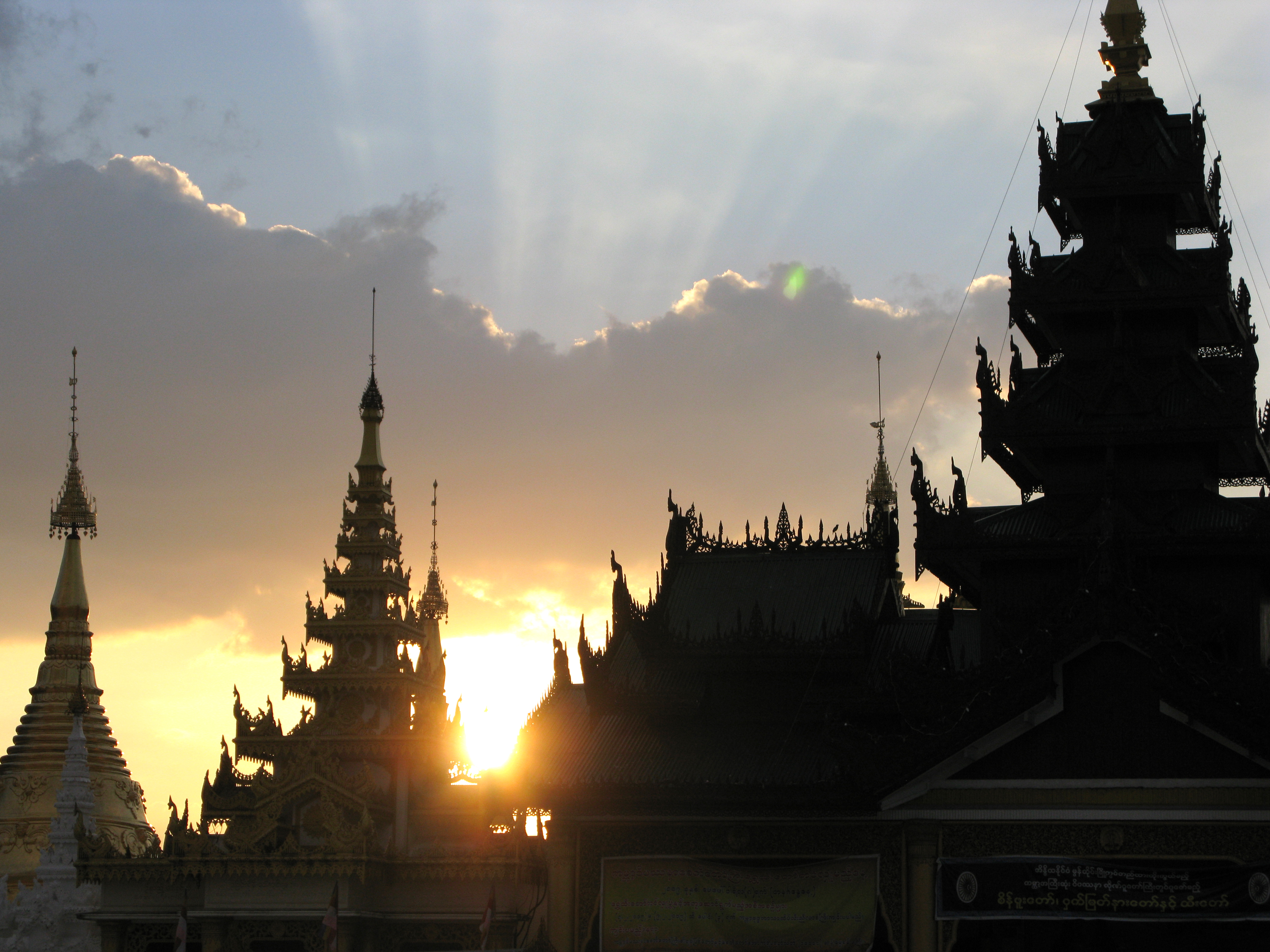
Shwedagon shrines at sunset

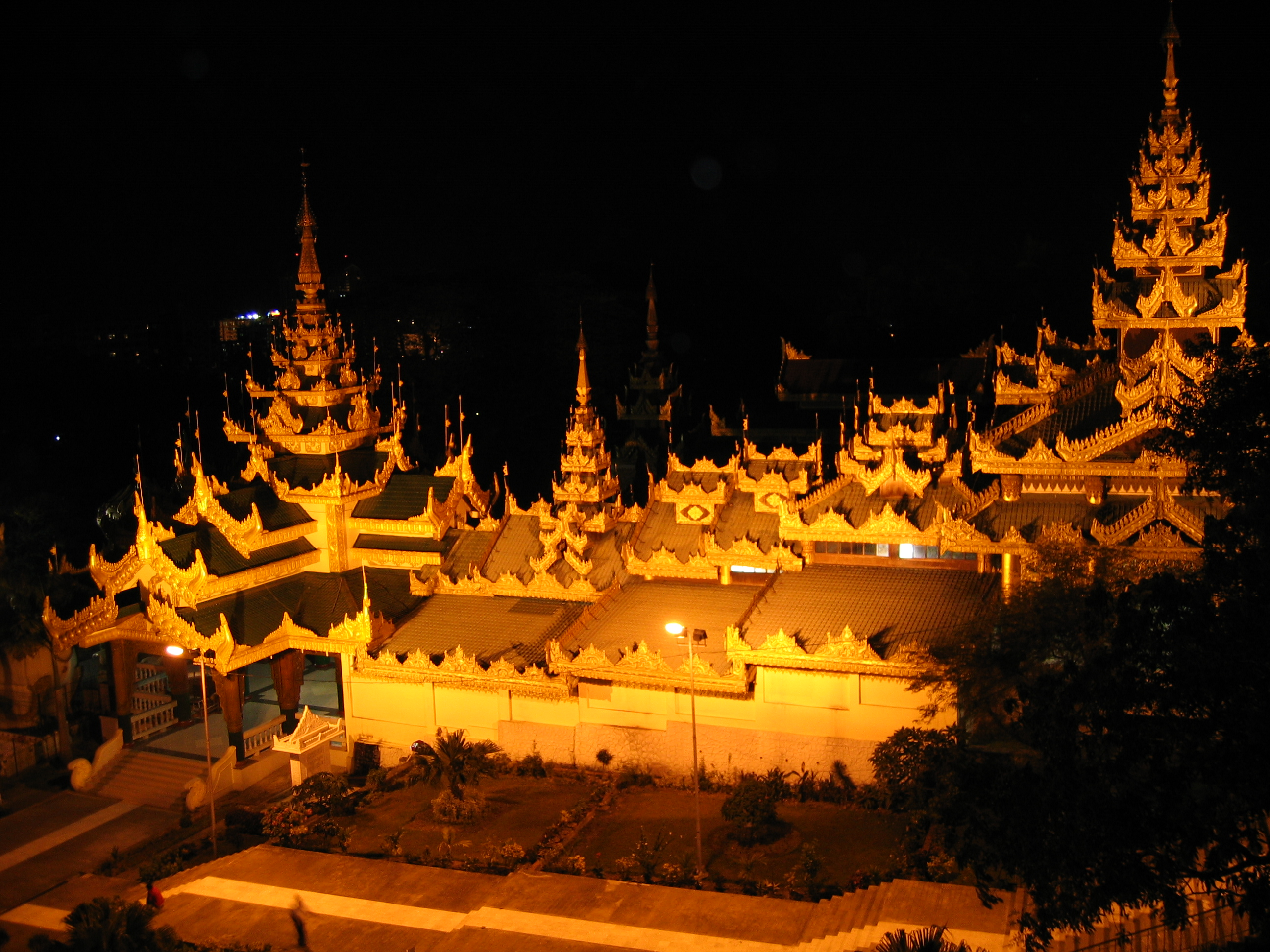
Outside the gates

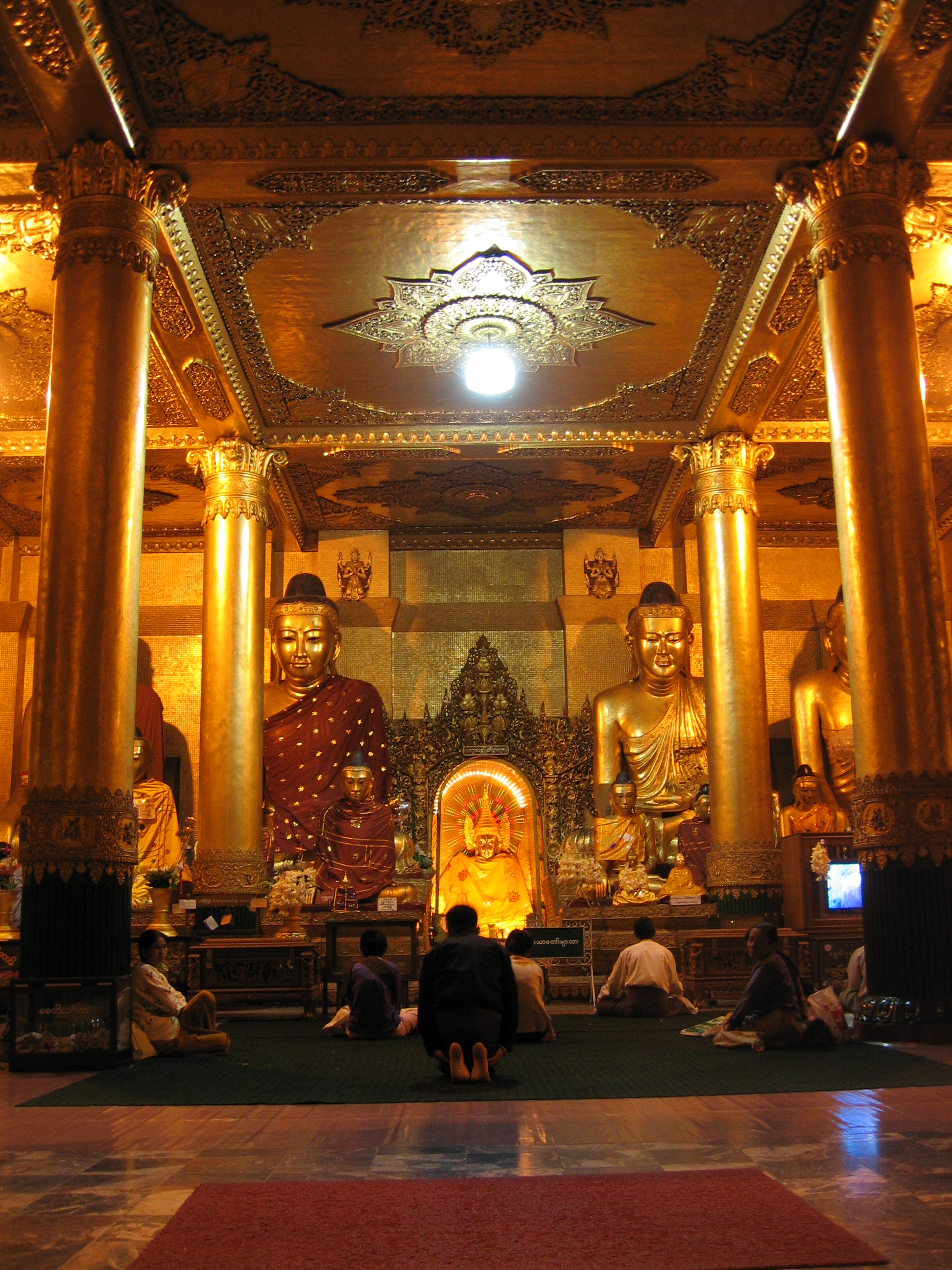
Devotees paying homage to the Triple Gem

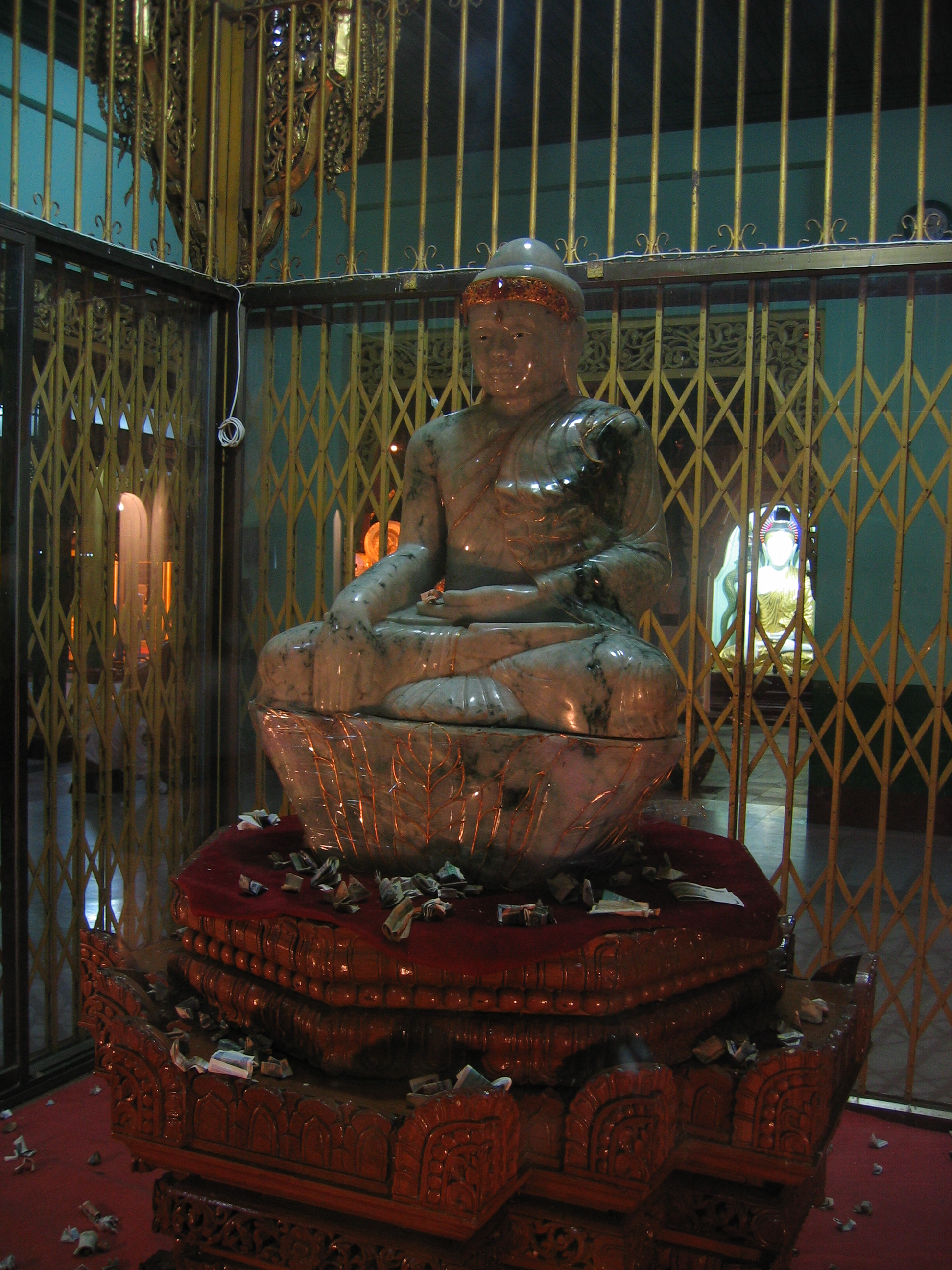
Jade Buddha

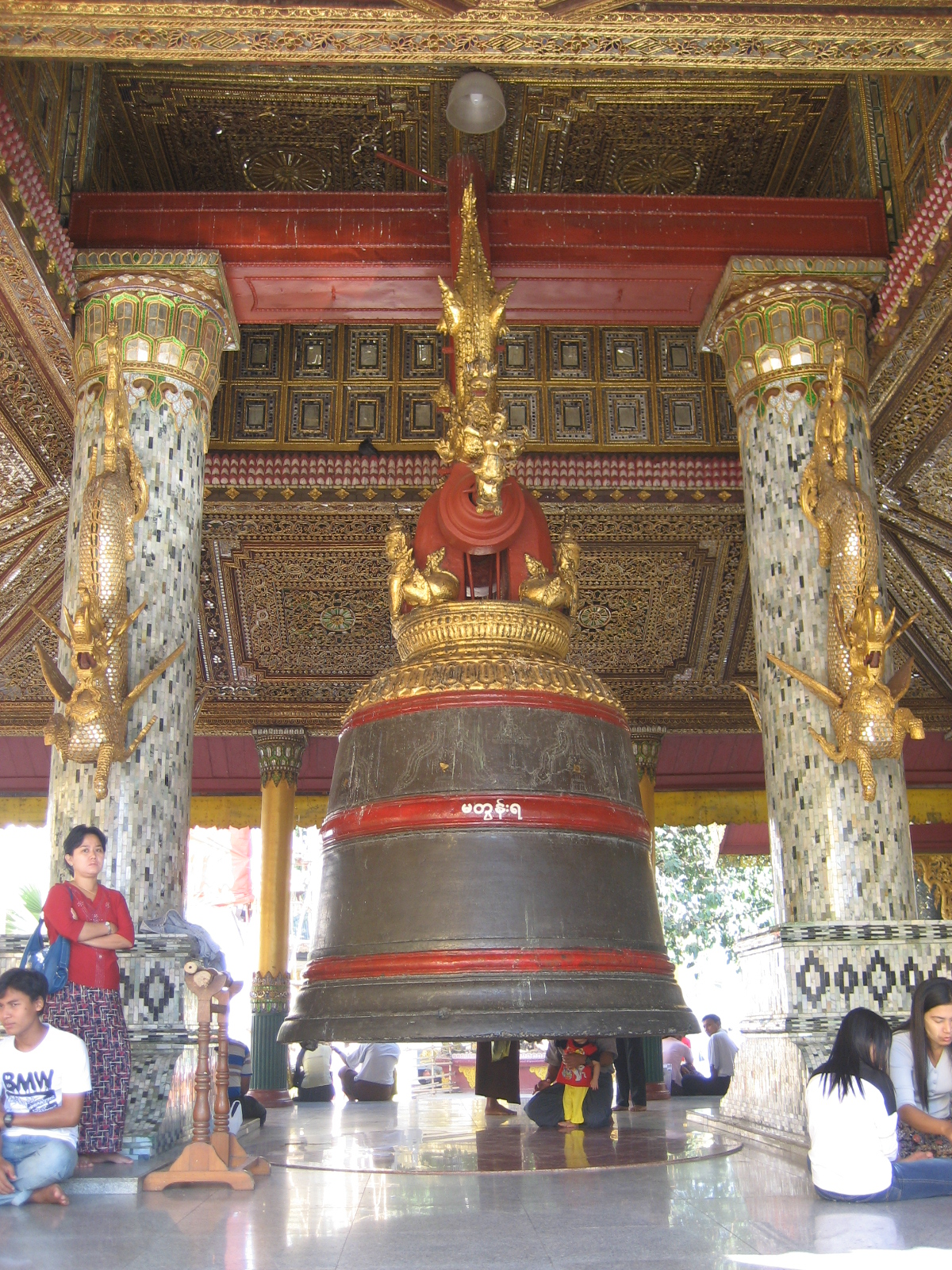
The Tharrawaddy Min Bell

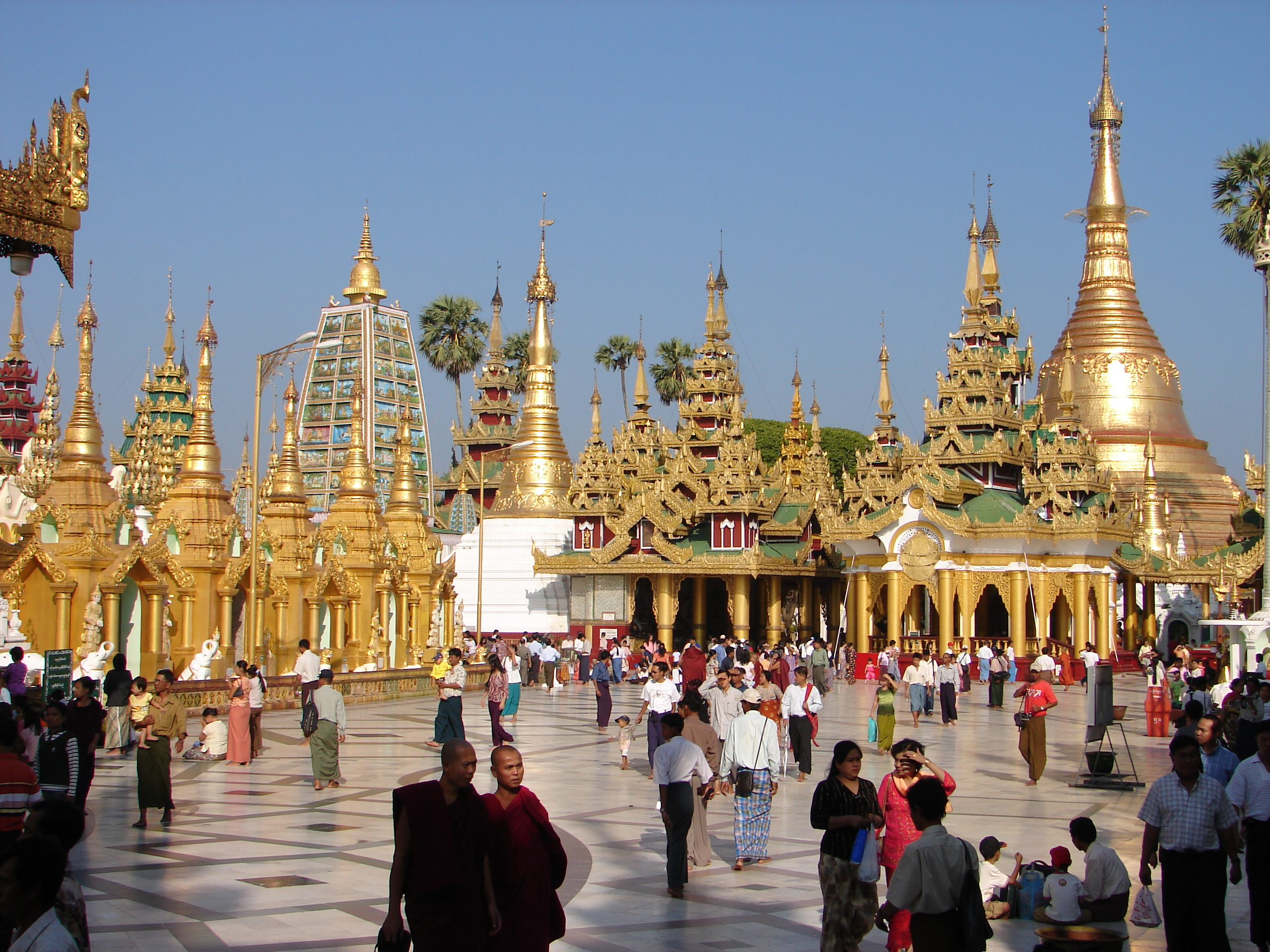
A crowded day at Shwedagon

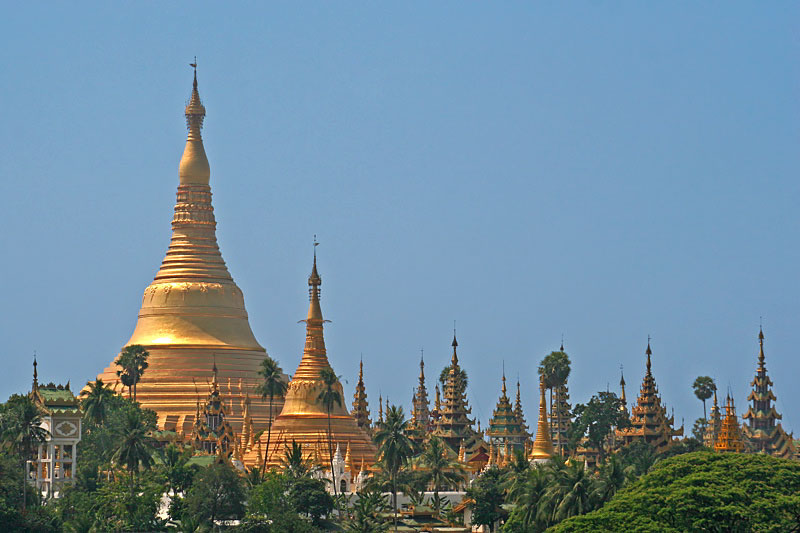
Shwedagon, a forest of pagodas

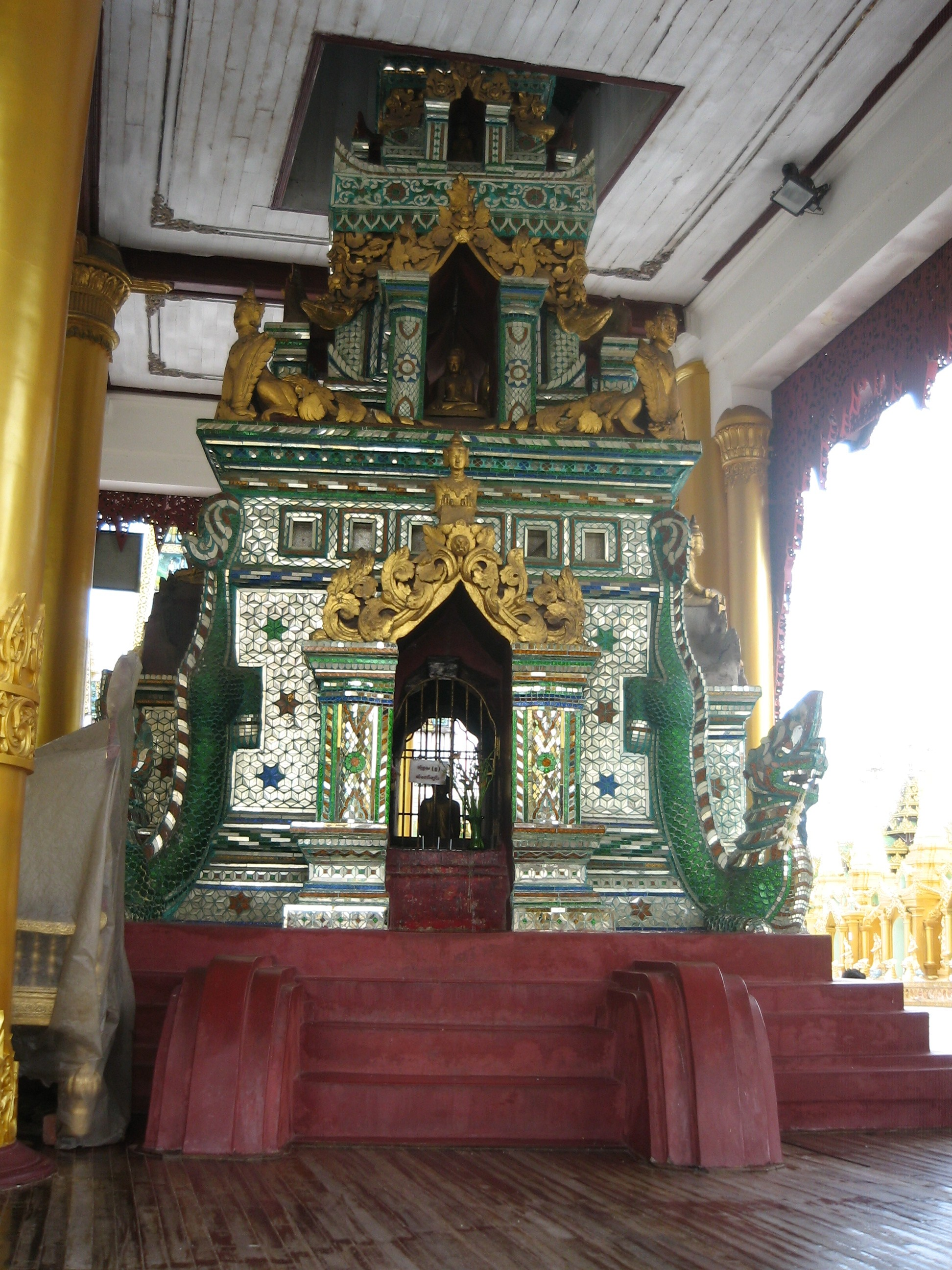
A mythical well, covered by a glass mosaic

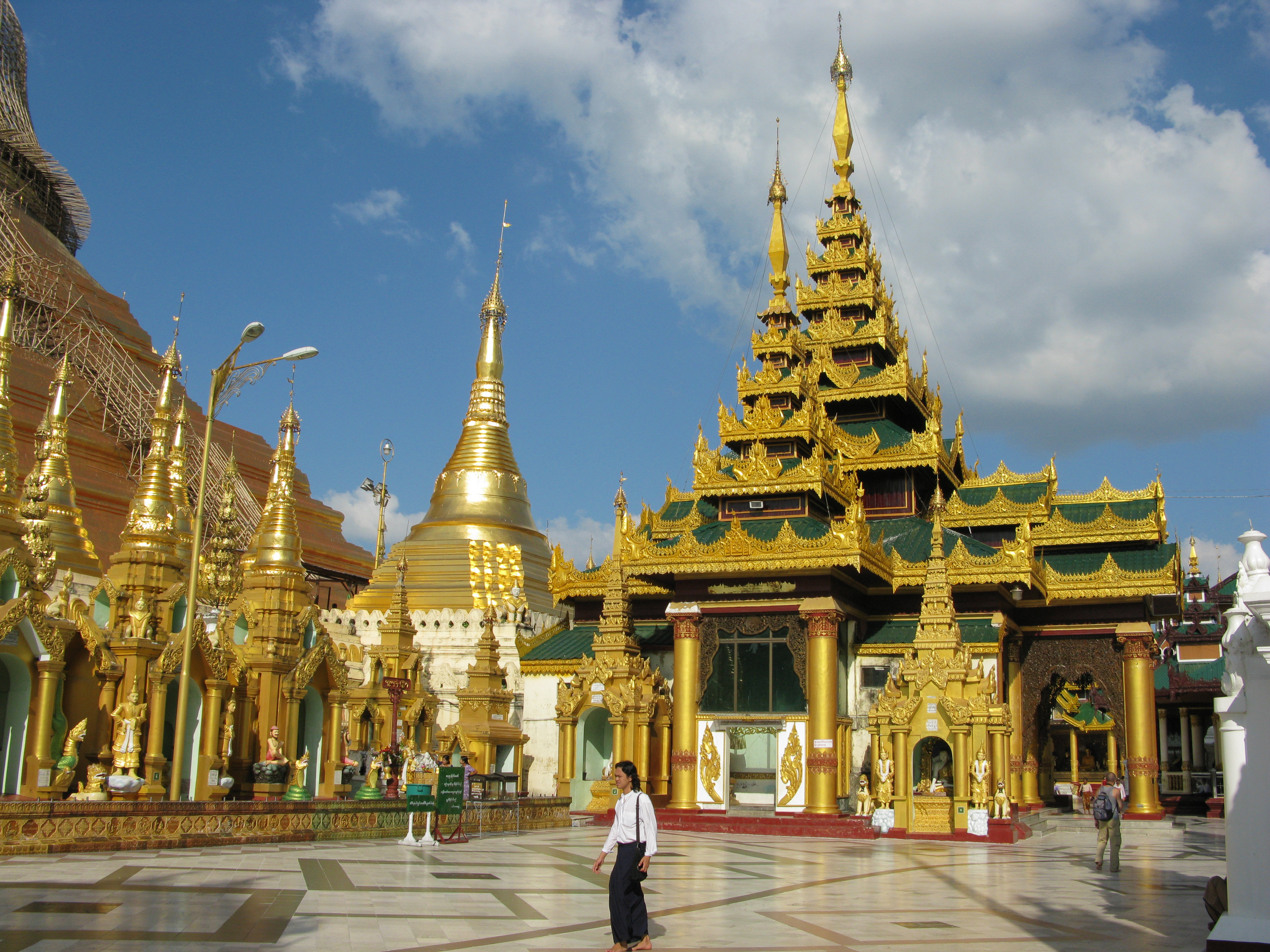
Mote (cardinal point building)

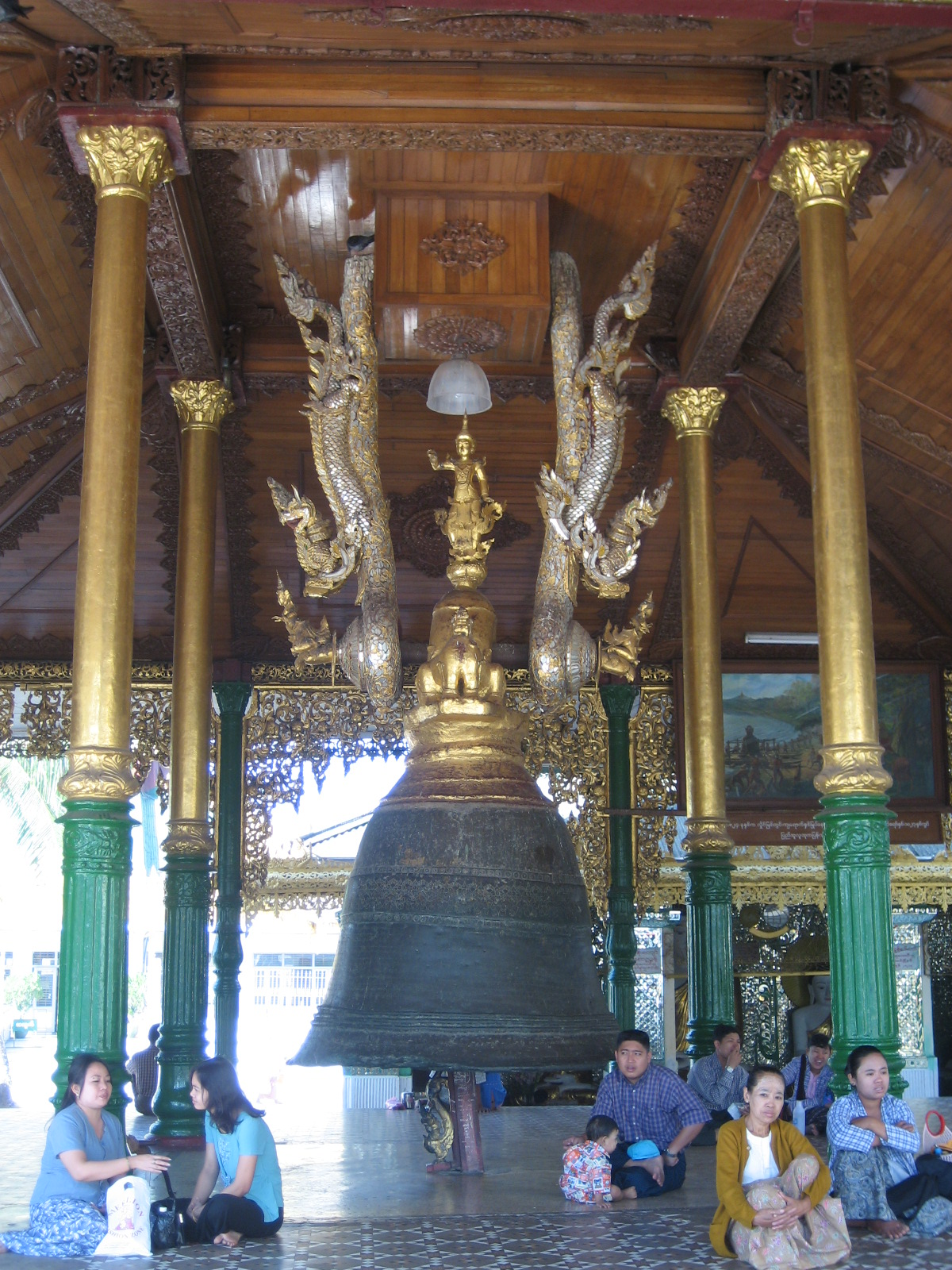
The Singu Min Bell

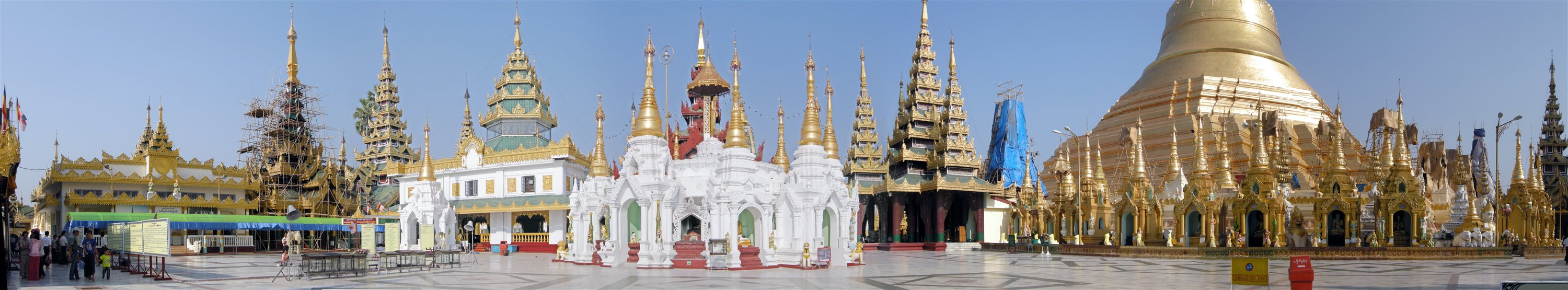
Panoramic view

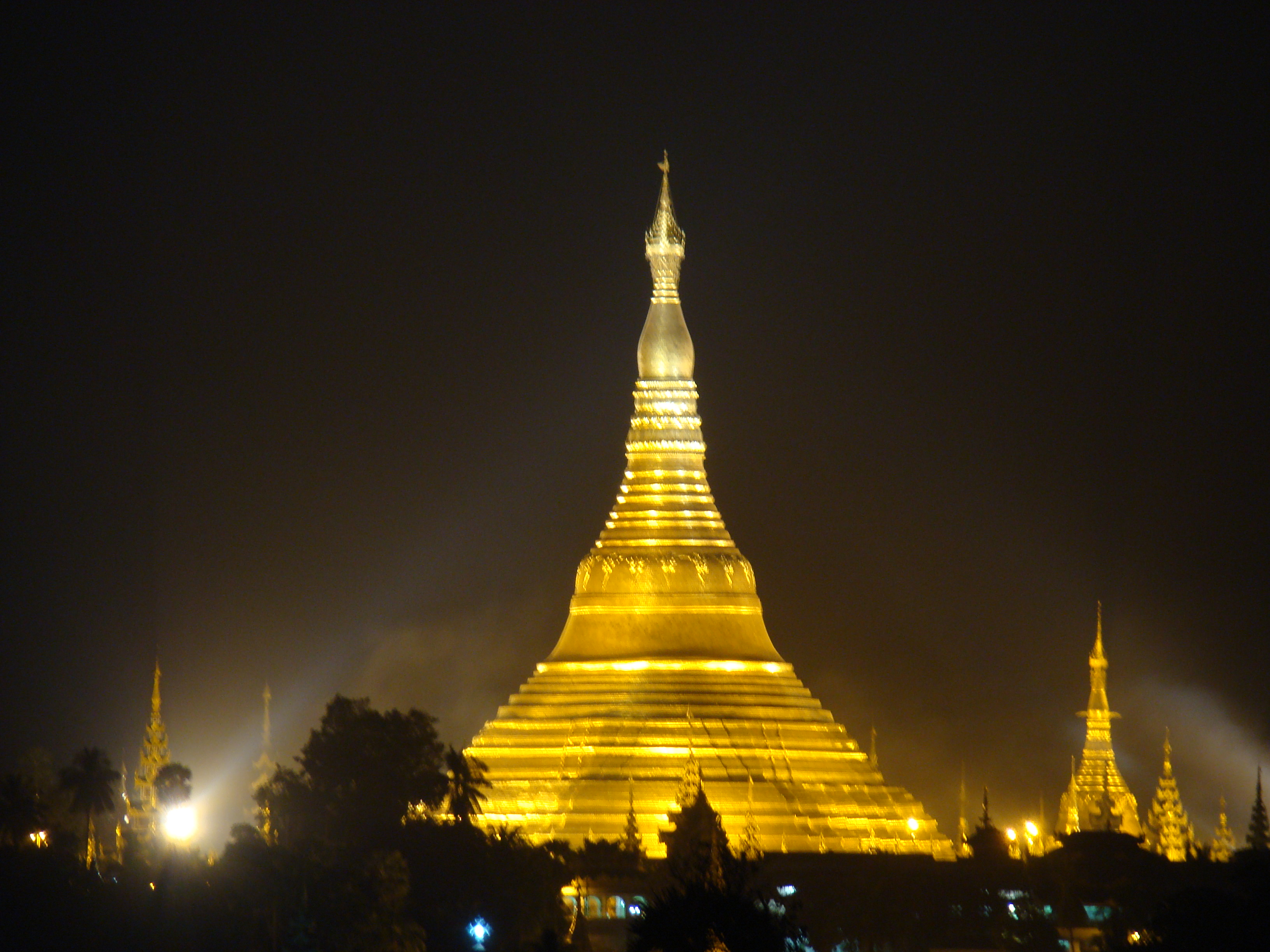
Shwedagon Pagoda at night

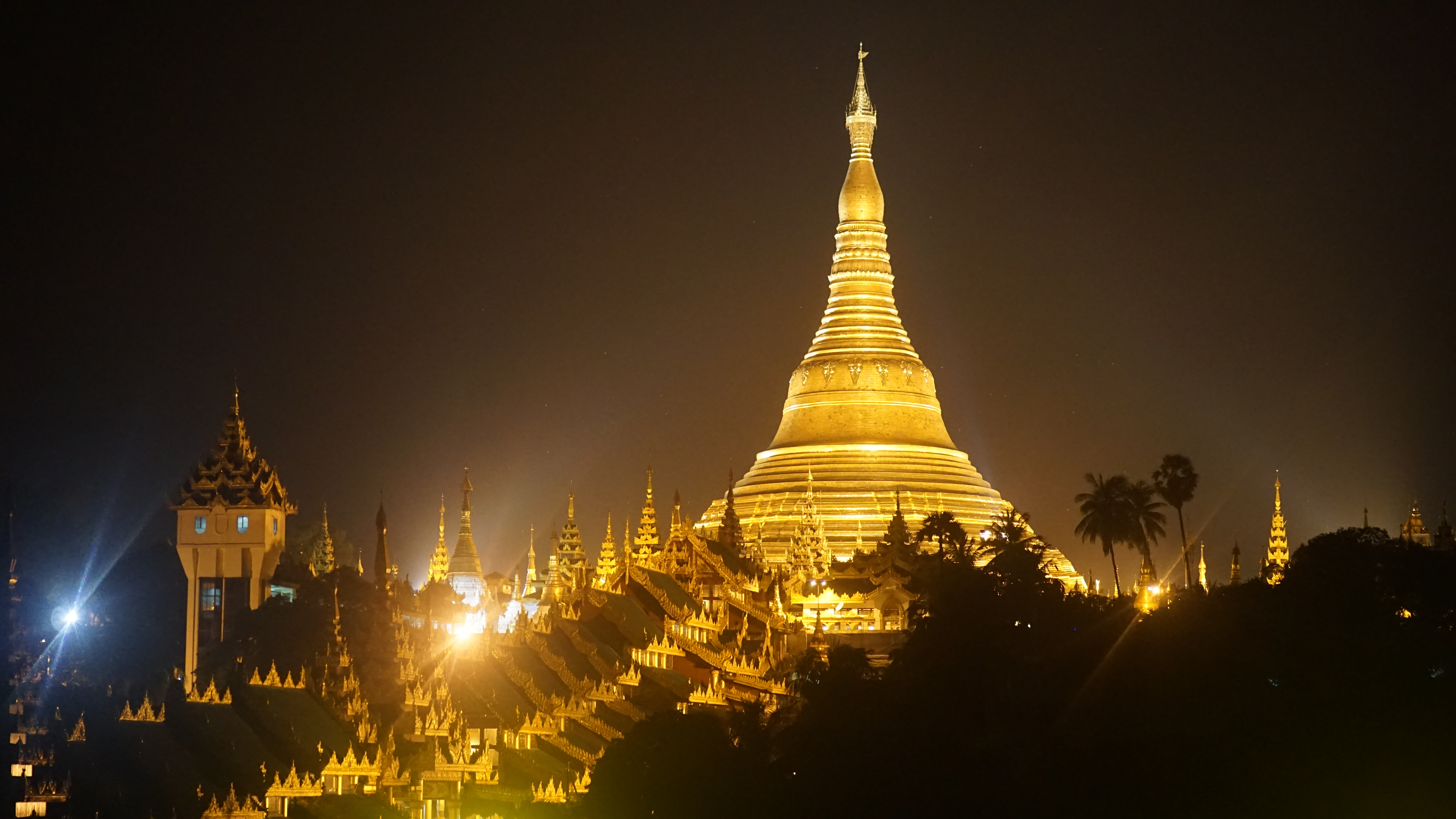
Shwedagon Pagoda at night from the east side

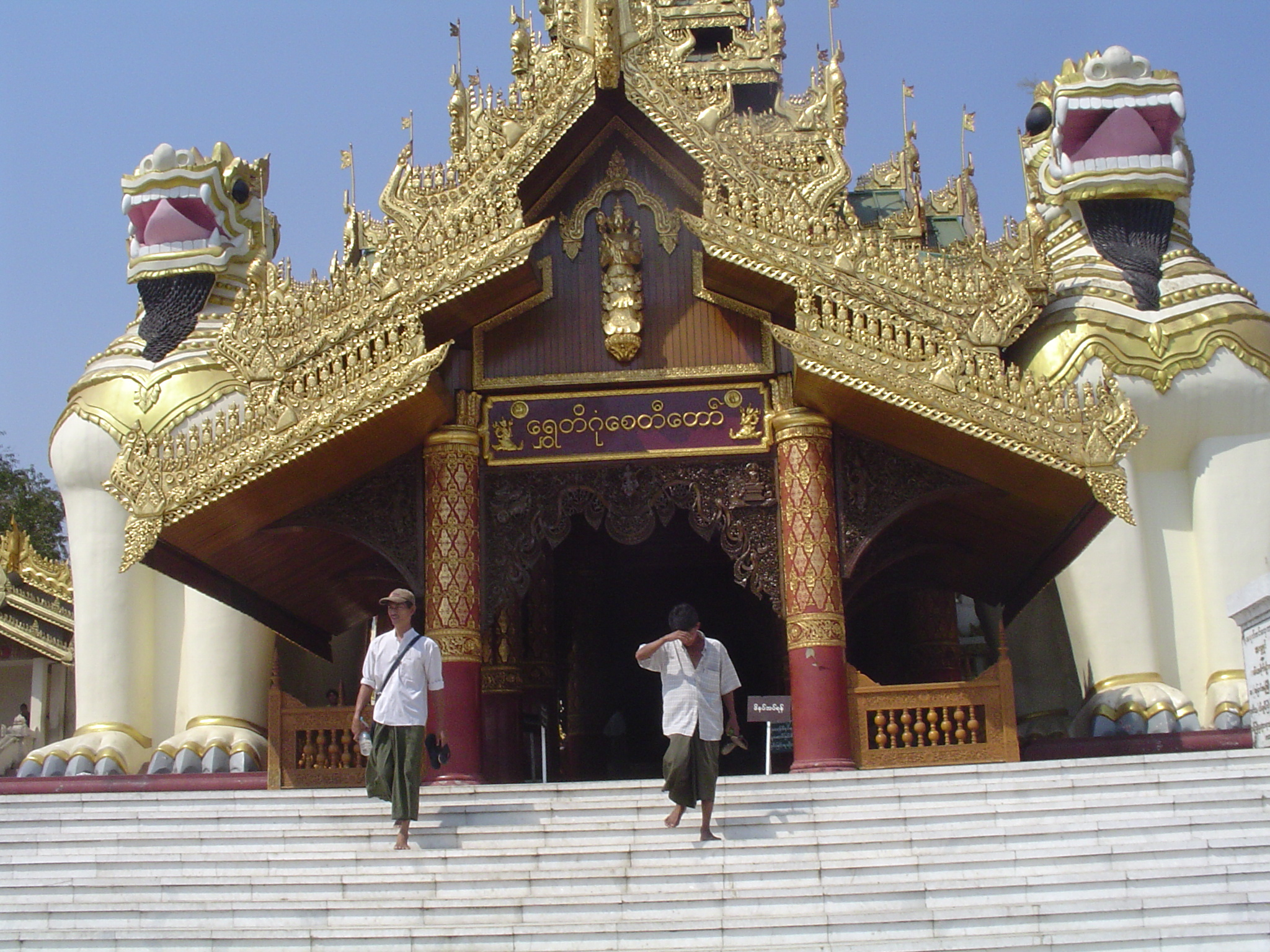
Southern Entrance

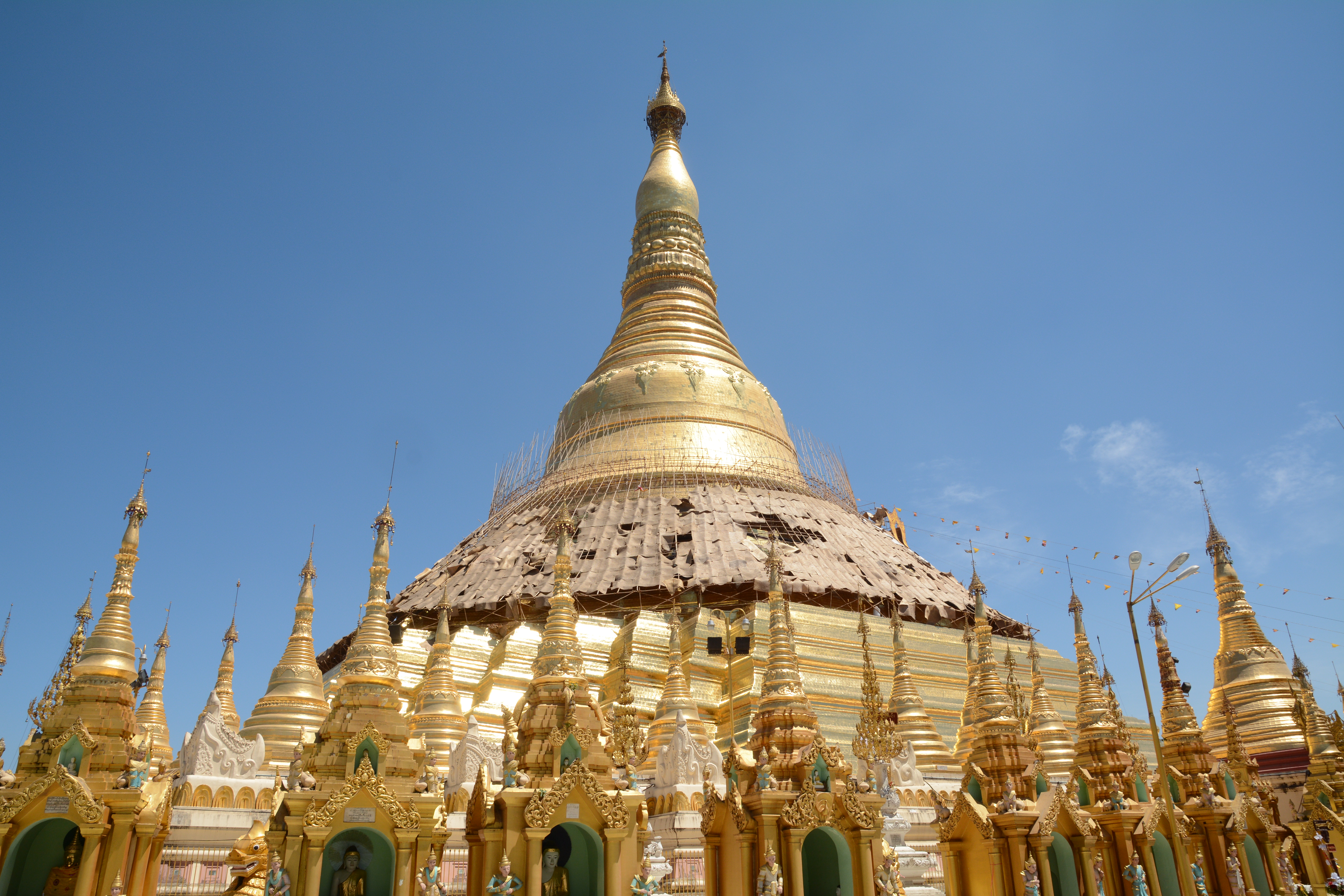
Repairing

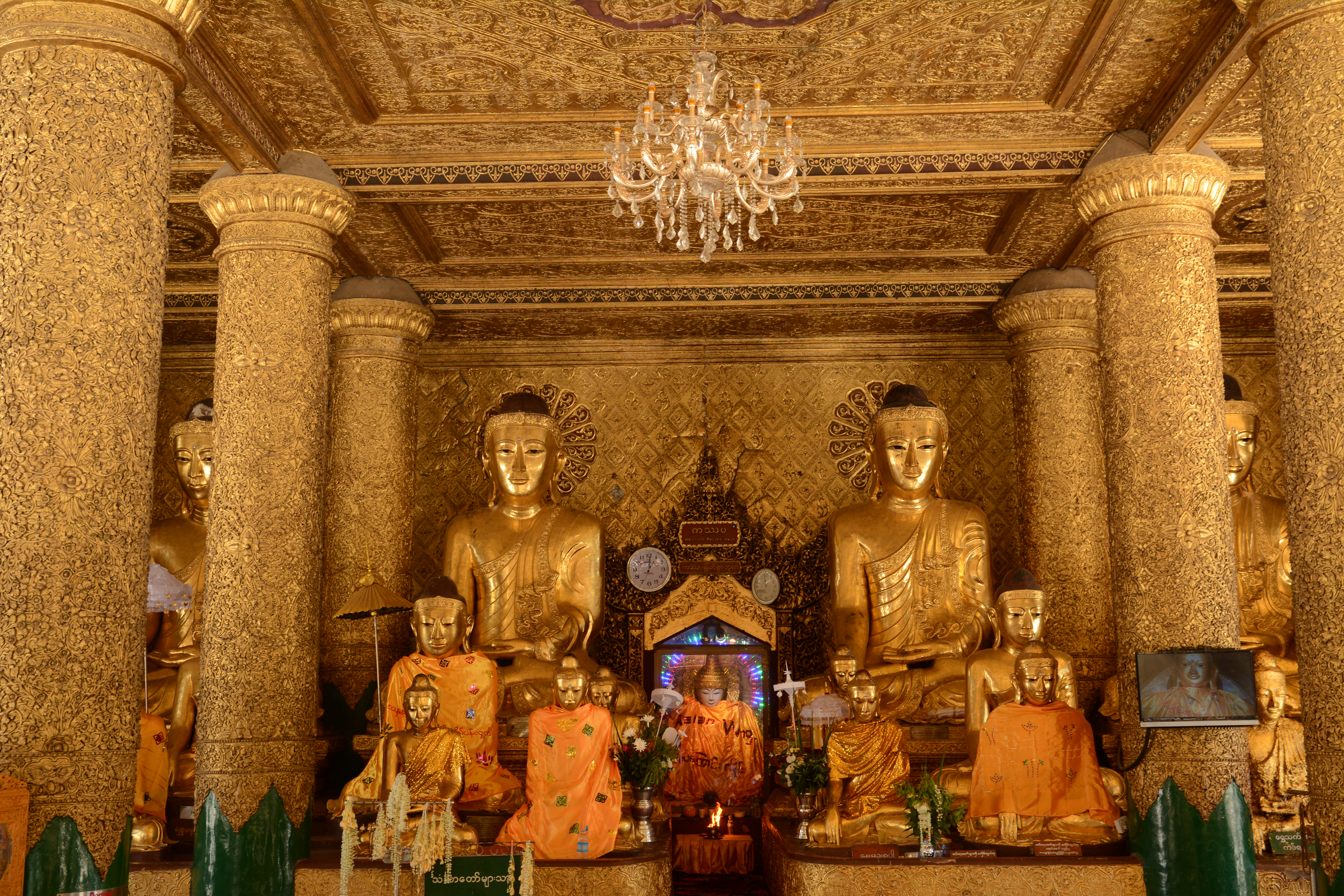
Interior

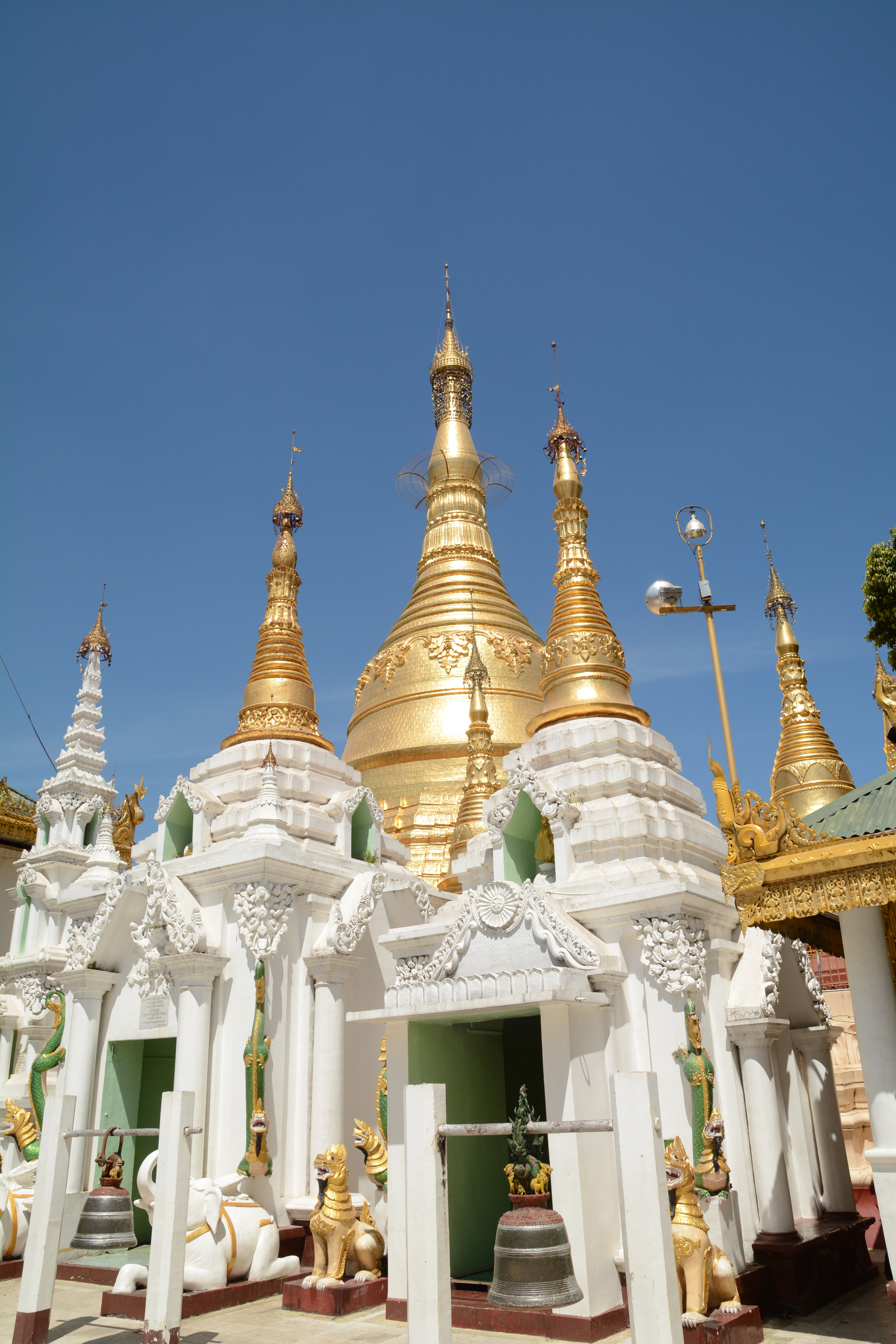
Second height pagoda

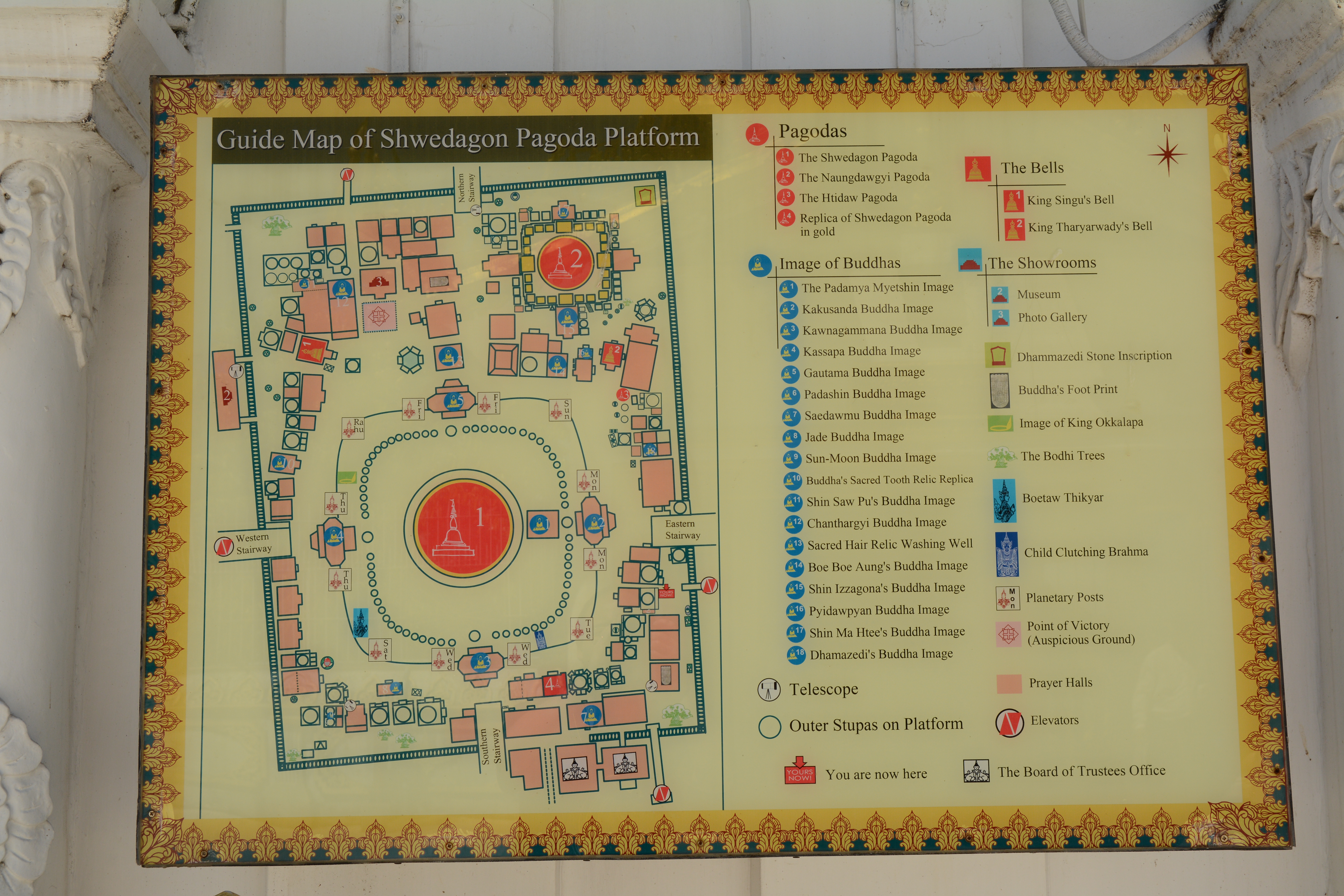
Inner map

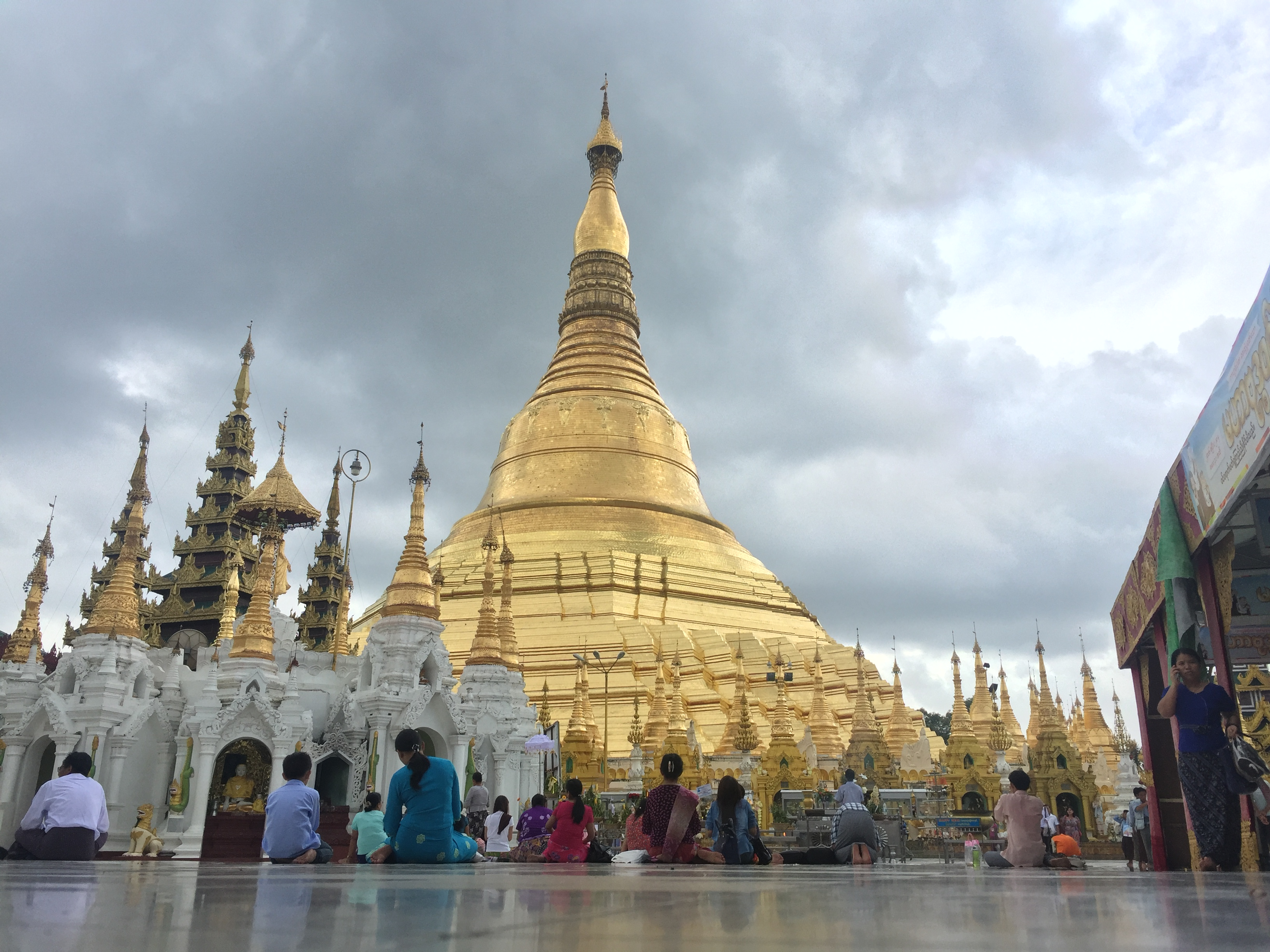
A cloudy day at Shwedagon

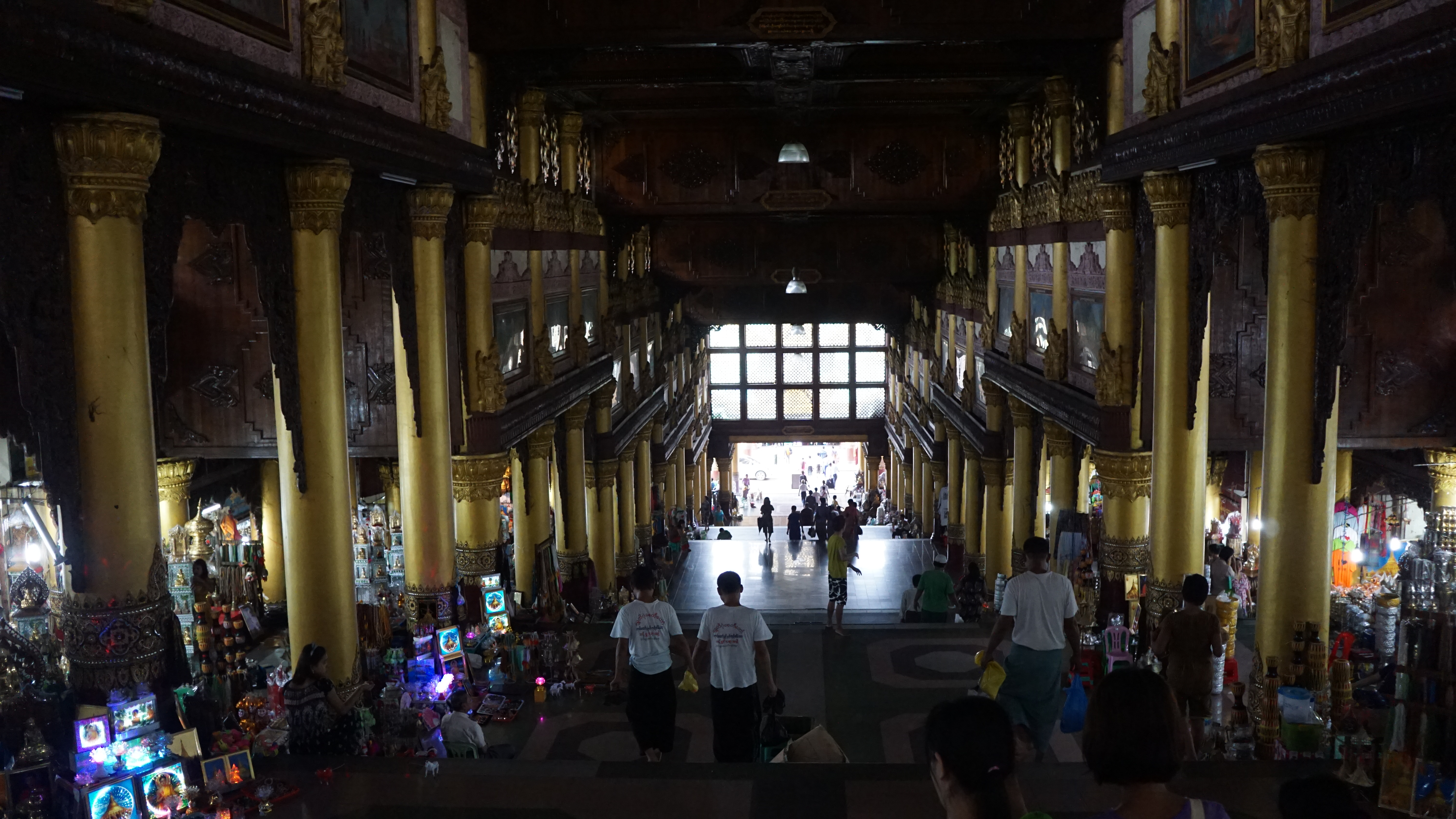
Eastern gate path of Shwedagon Pagoda

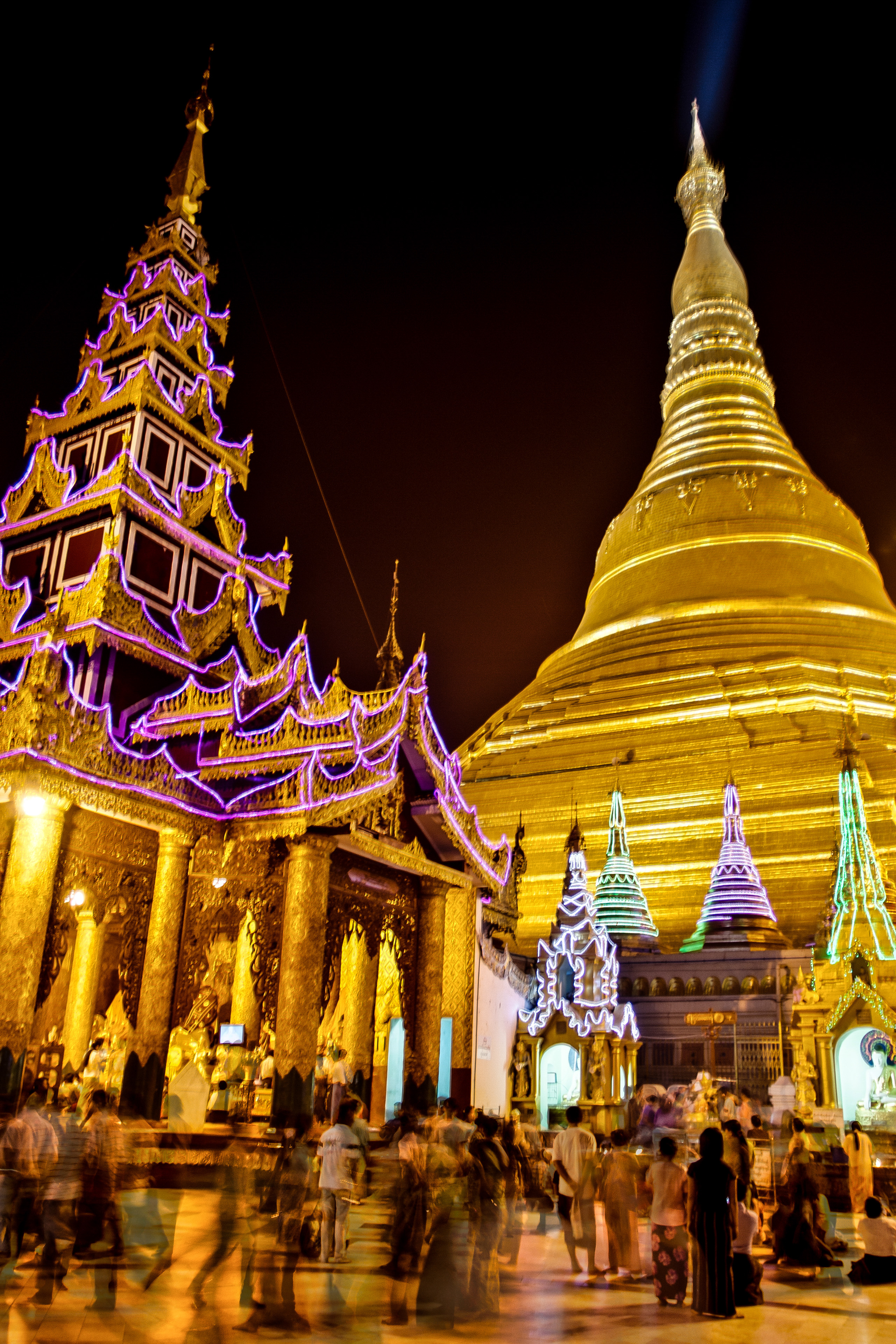
Shwedagon Pagoda - Yangon, Myanmar

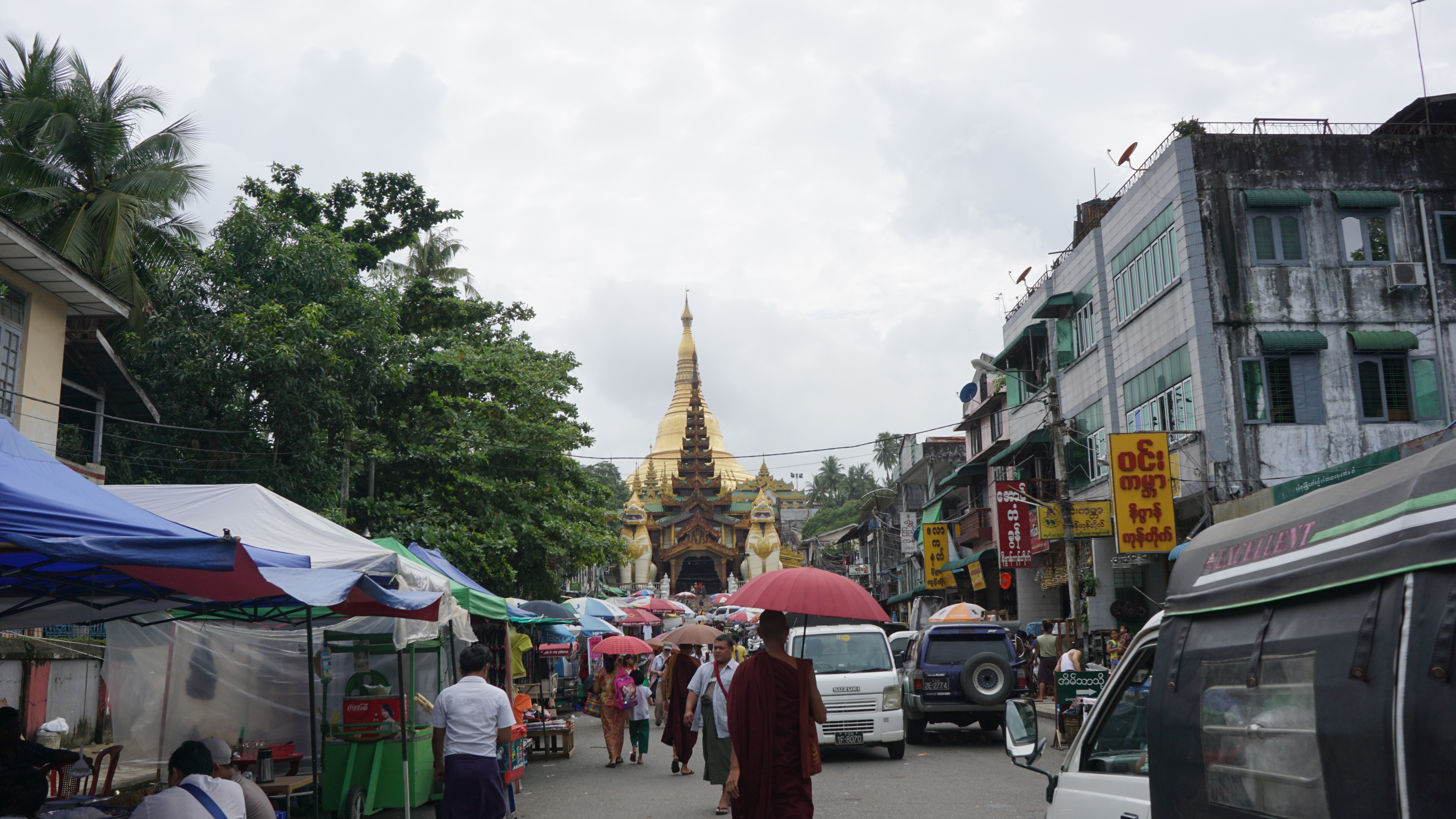
Market nears Shwedagon Pagoda

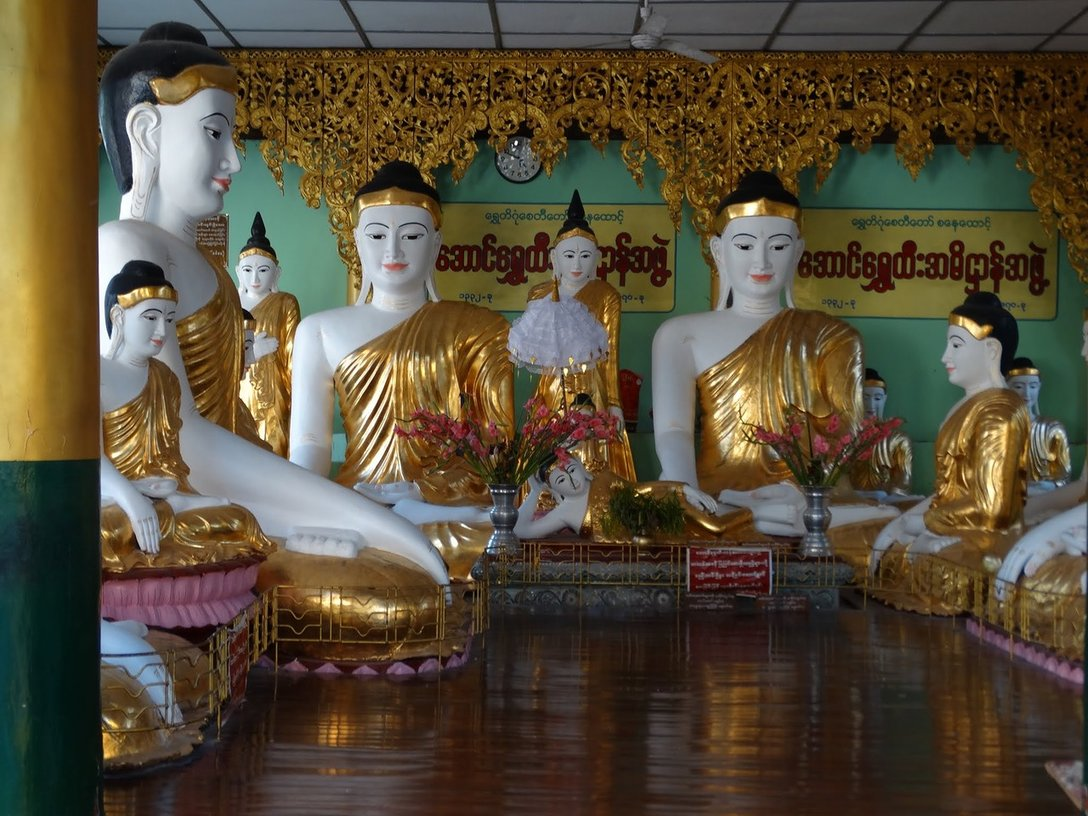
In Shwedagon pagoda complex

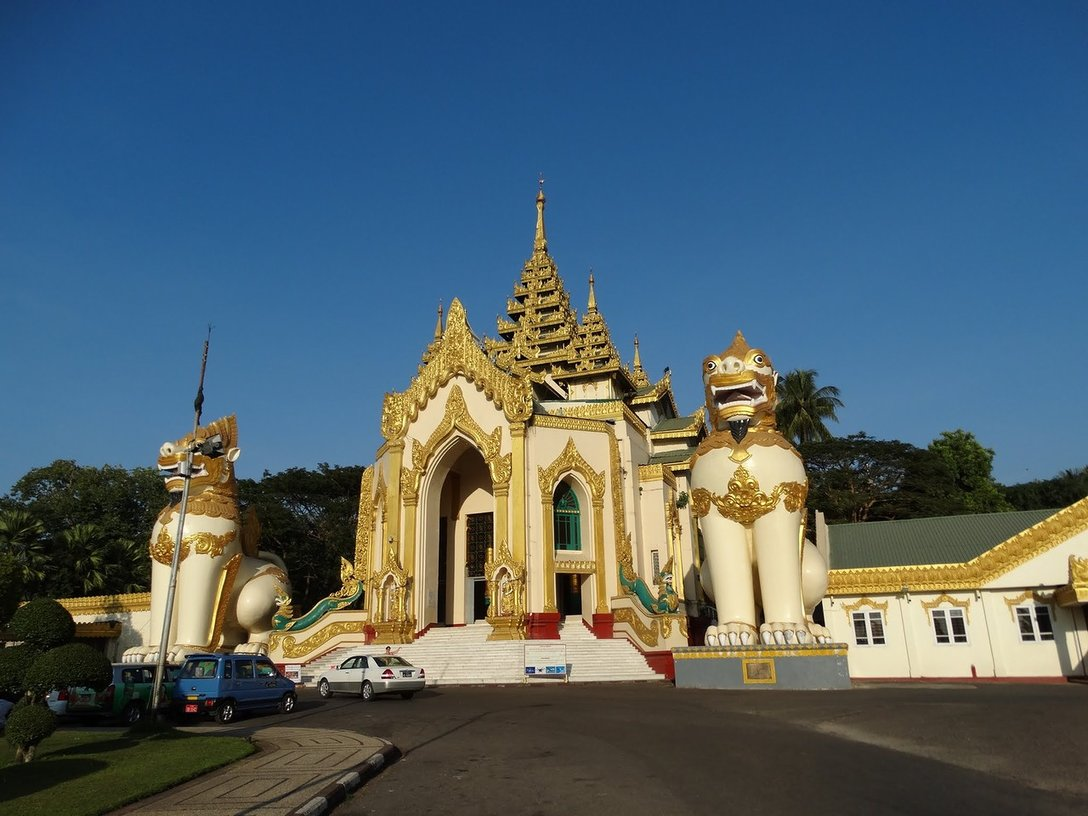
Western gate to Shwedagon pagoda

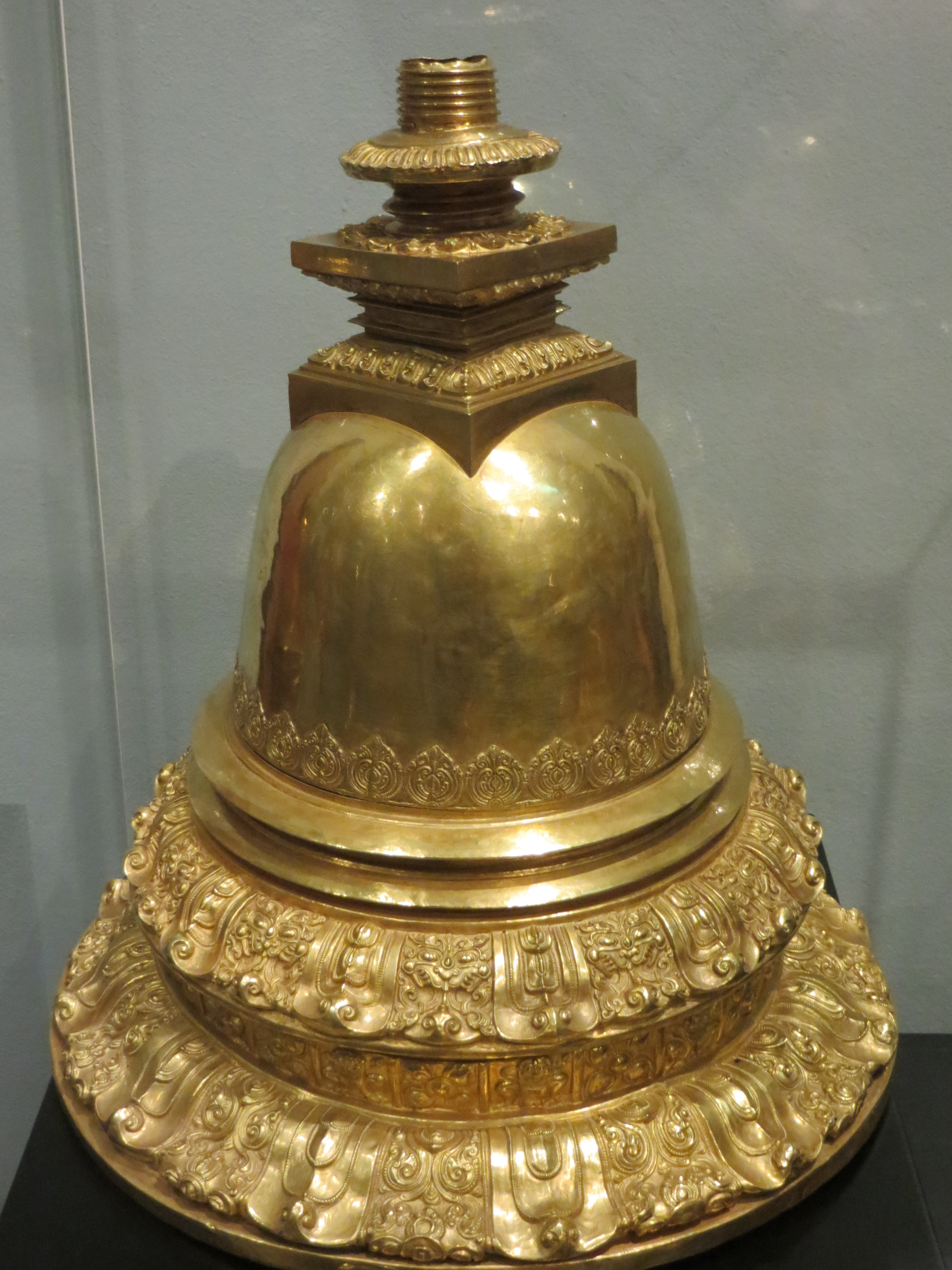
Gold reliquary in the shape of a stupa found at the base of the Shwedagon Pagoda in 1855 and now in the V&A Museum. It dates to the 15th/16th centuries.

== See also ==
- Awgatha
- Gadaw
- Shinbyu
- Burmese pagoda
- Pagoda festival
- Buddhism in Myanmar
- History of Buddhism
- List of tallest structures built before the 20th century
