= Yangon City Heritage List =

List of man-made landmarks in Yangon, Myanmar

The Yangon City Heritage List is a list of man-made landmarks in Yangon, Myanmar, so designated by the city government, Yangon City Development Committee. The list consists of 188 structures (as of 2001), and is largely made up of religious structures and British colonial-era buildings. The list is organized by the township in which the structures are located. In 2010, the Ministry of Culture further announced that 16 ancient pagodas in Yangon Division are recognized as cultural heritage sites, effective 10 February 2010. The Shwedagon Pagoda is recognized as both an Ancient Monument Zone and Protected and Preserved Zone. The other 15 are listed as Ancient Monument Zones.

== Ahlon ==
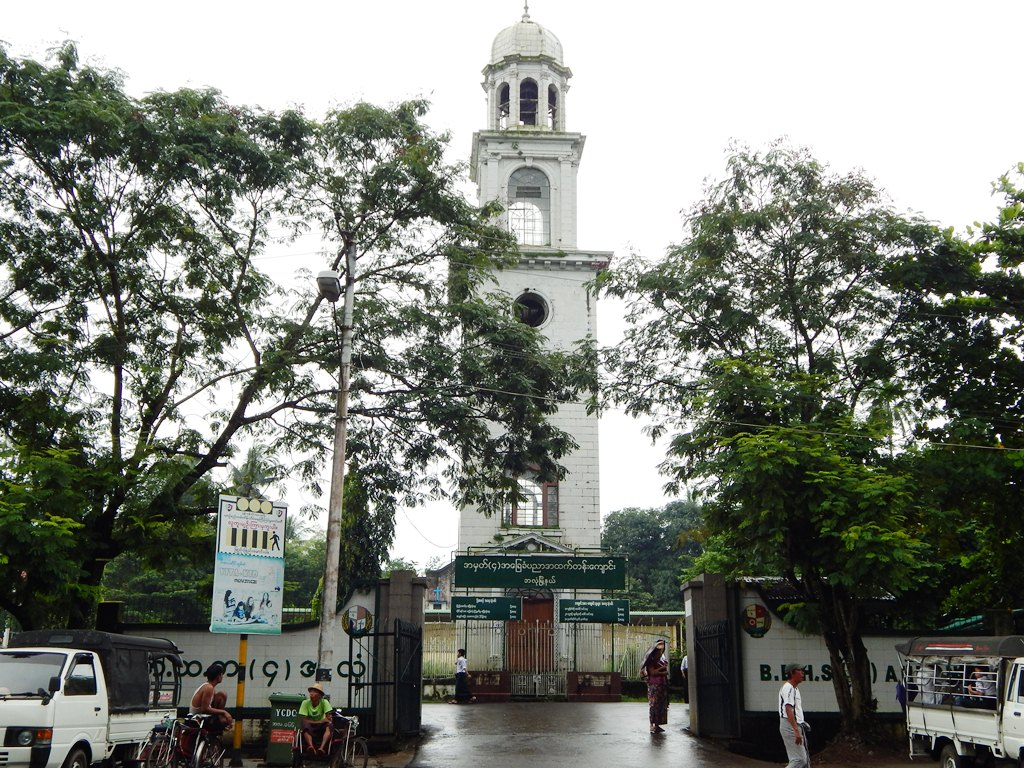
BEHS 4 Ahlon

Structure	Type	Address	Notes
BEHS 4 Ahlon	School	57 Lower Kyimyindaing Road	Former Cushing High School

== Bahan ==
Structure	Type	Address	Notes
Bogyoke Aung San Museum	Museum	25 Bogyoke Museum Lane	
Chaukhtatgyi Pagoda	Pagoda	Shwegondaing Lane	
Guanyin San Buddhist Sasana Center	Chinese Temple	136 West Shwegondaing Lane	
Guanyin Si Chinese Buddhist Monastery	Chinese Buddhist Monastery	58 Arzarni Lane	
Hou San Si Chinese Temple	Chinese Temple	160 Kaba Aye Pagoda Road	
Mayor's Residence (Old)	Hotel	21 Pearl Lane	Now, Mya Yeik Nyo Hotel
Mayor's Guest House (Old)	Hotel	22 Pearl Lane	Now, Mya Yeik Nyo Hotel
Ministry of Culture Building	Office	131 Kaba Aye Pagoda Road	
Ngadatgyi Pagoda	Pagoda	Shwegondaing Lane	
Taingtaya Monastery Compound of Ngadatgyi Monastery	Monastery		
Zhonghuasi Chinese Buddhist Nunnery	Chinese Buddhist Convent	69 Old Yedashe Lane	

== Botataung ==
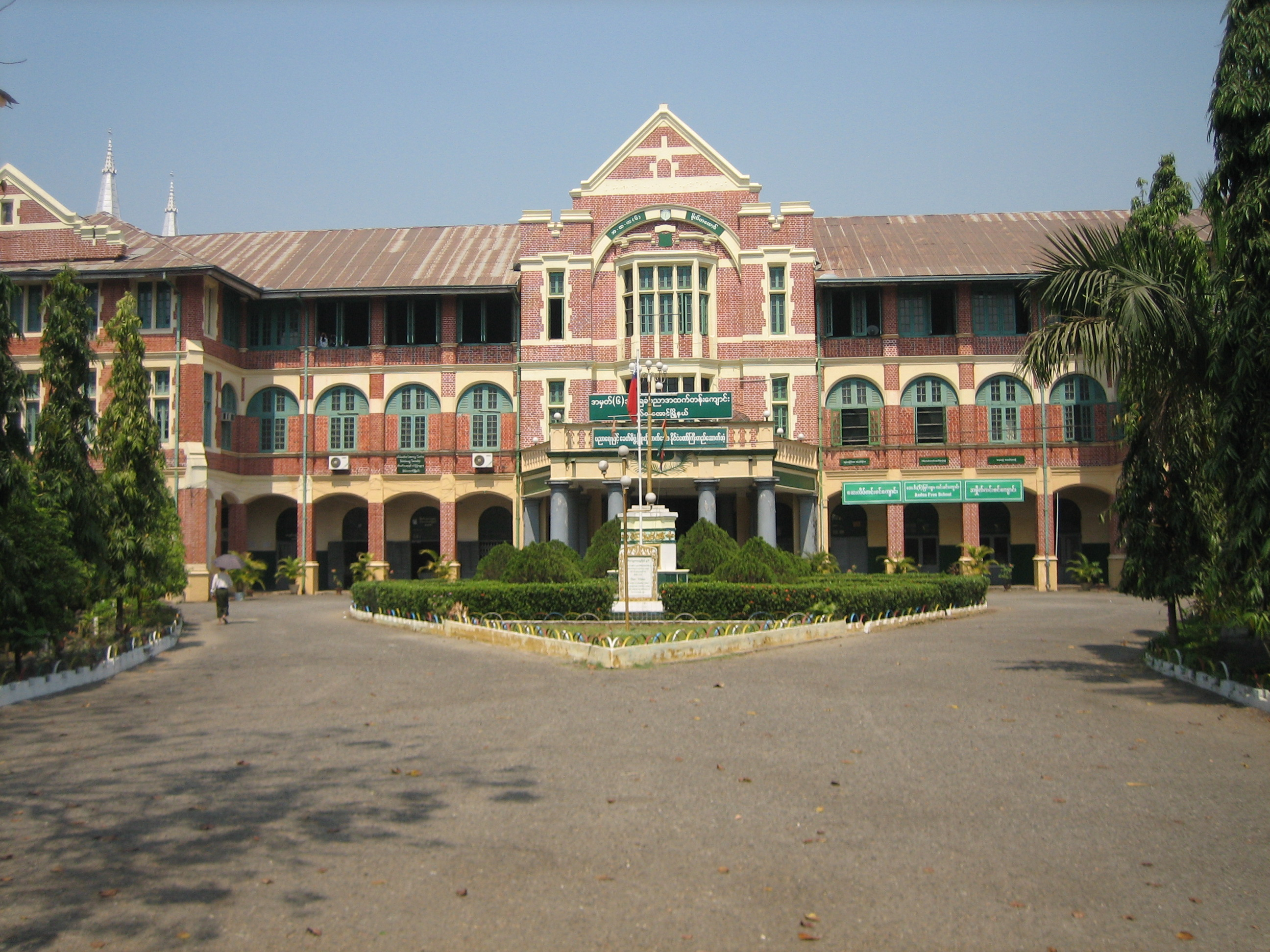
BEHS 6 Botataung

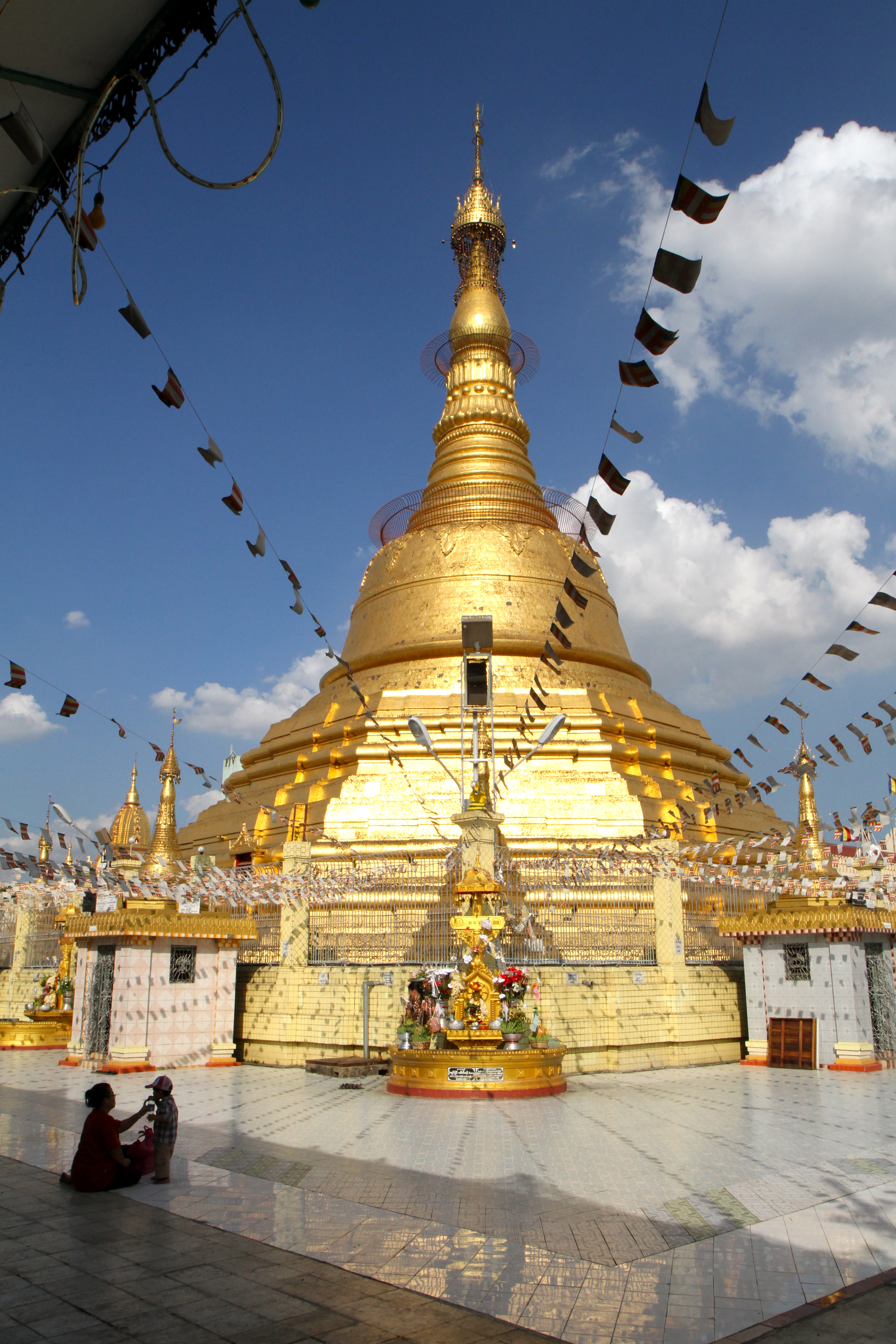
Botataung Pagoda

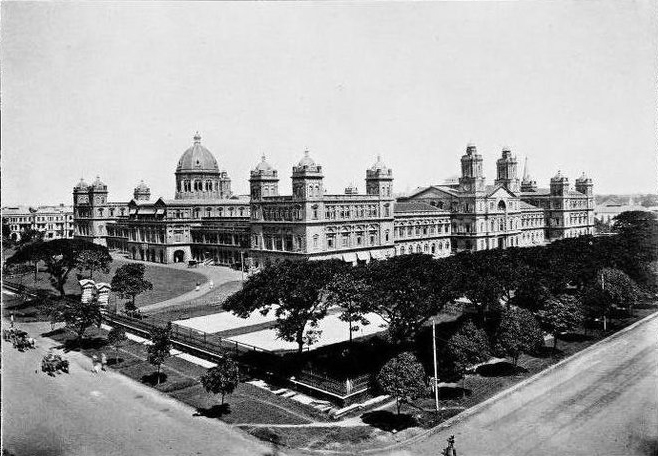
Secretariat Building

Structure	Type	Address	Notes
BEHS 2 Botataung	School	152 Bo Myat Tun Road	formerly, St. Phillips’ Diocesan School
BEHS 4 Botataung	School	300 Theinbyu Road	formerly, St. Mary's Convent School
BEHS 6 Botataung	School	Anawrahta Road	formerly, St. Paul's English High School
Botataung Pagoda	Pagoda	Strand Road	
Siyin Baptist Church	Church	152 Bo Myat Tun Road	formerly St Philip's Church (Anglican)
Compressor Station		233-239 Maha Bandula Road	
Ministers' Office	Government office	300 Theinbyu Road	Where Gen. Aung San was assassinated in 1947. Built in 1905.
Printing & Publishing Enterprise		228 Theinbyu Road	
St. Mary's Cathedral	Church	372 Bo Aung Kyaw Road	Largest cathedral in Myanmar

== Dagon ==
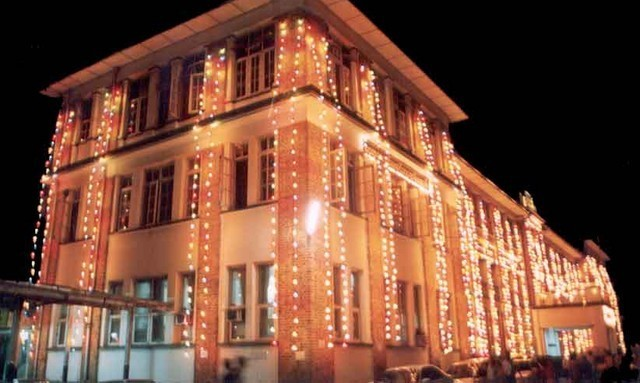
BEHS 1 Dagon

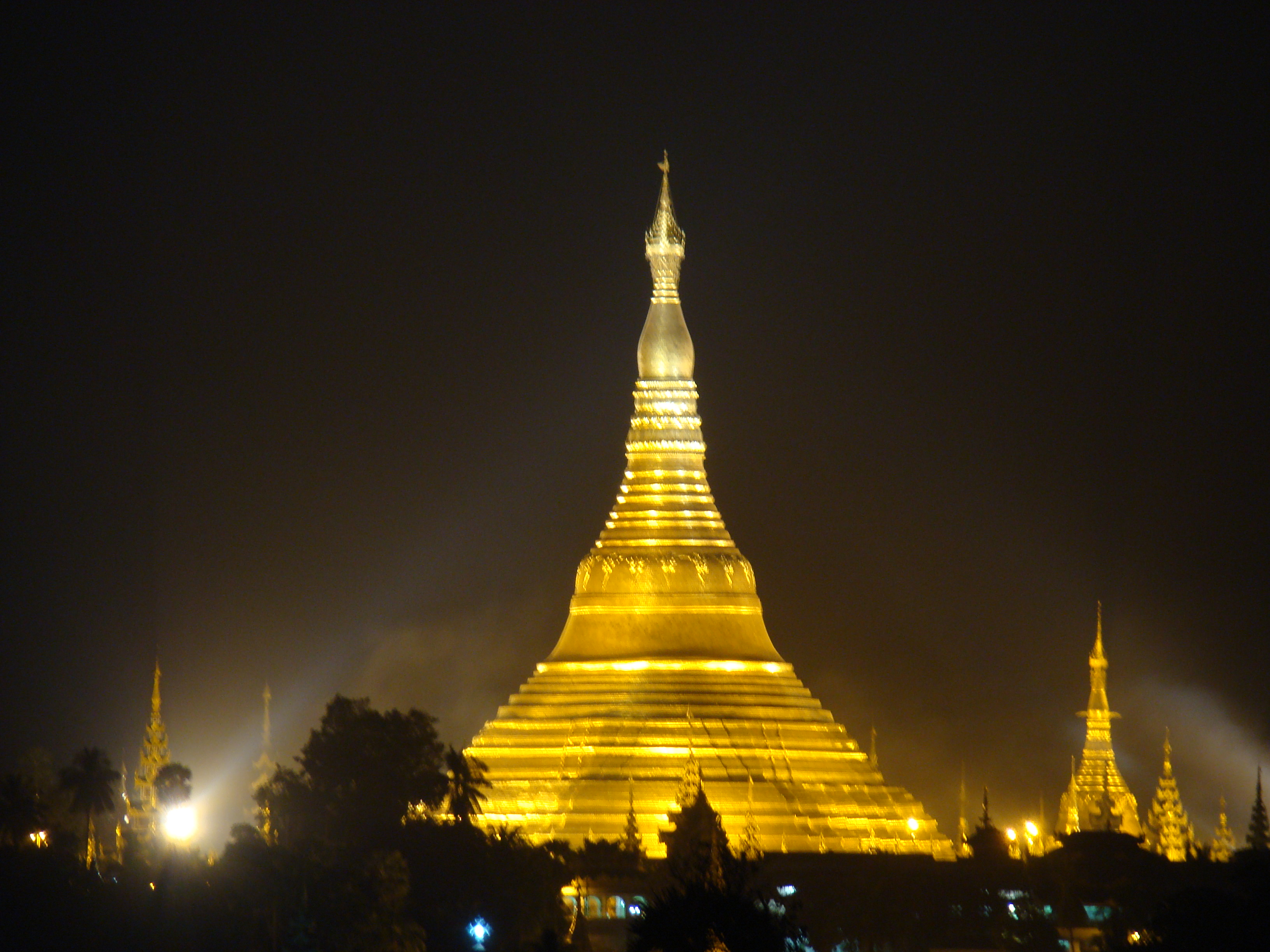
Shwedagon Pagoda

Structure	Type	Address	Notes
BEHS 1 Dagon	School	57 Alanpyapaya Road	Former Methodist English High School
BEHS 2 Dagon	School	353 Myoma Kyaung Lane	Former Myoma National High School, Built in 1922.
Department of Public Health Laboratory	Health clinic	35 Mawgundaik Lane	
Diplomatic Residence Compound	Housing	82 Pyidaungzu Yeiktha Avenue (Corner of Pyay Road)	
Eindawya Pagoda	Pagoda	Myoma Kyaung Lane	
India House	Office	35 Diplomat Avenue	
Kyargu Monastery	Monastery	49 Shwedagon Pagoda Road	
Maha Wizaya Pagoda	Pagoda	Shwedagon Pagoda Road	
Methodist English Church	Church	65 Alanpyapaya Road	
Ministry of Foreign Affairs	Office	37 Diplomat Avenue	
National Archives Department	Office	114 Pyidaungzu Yeiktha Avenue	
St. Gabriel's Church	Church	64 Shwedagon Pagoda Road	
St. John's Catholic Church	Church	25 Mawgundaik Lane (Corner of Shwedagon Pagoda Road)	
Sein Yaungchi Pagoda	Pagoda	Shwedagon Pagoda Road	
Shwedagon Pagoda	Pagoda	Shwedagon Pagoda Road	
Yahanda Ordination Hall	Temple	Shwedagon Pagoda Road	
Zafar Shah Darga		6 Ziwaka Lane	

== Hlaing ==
Structure	Type	Address	Notes
Sri Mary Yeoman Hindu Temple	Temple	49 Yangon-Insein Road	

== Insein ==
Structure	Type	Address	Notes
Animal Husbandry and Veterinary Science Institute Headquarters	Office		
BEHS 1 Insein	School	Mingyi Road	
Criminal Investigation Department (CID)	Office	Lower Mingaladon Road	
Government Technical Institute, Insein	College	Lower Mingaladon Road	
Insein General Hospital	Hospital	Mingyi Road	
Su Paung Yon Office Complex	Office	Mingyi Road	

== Kamayut ==
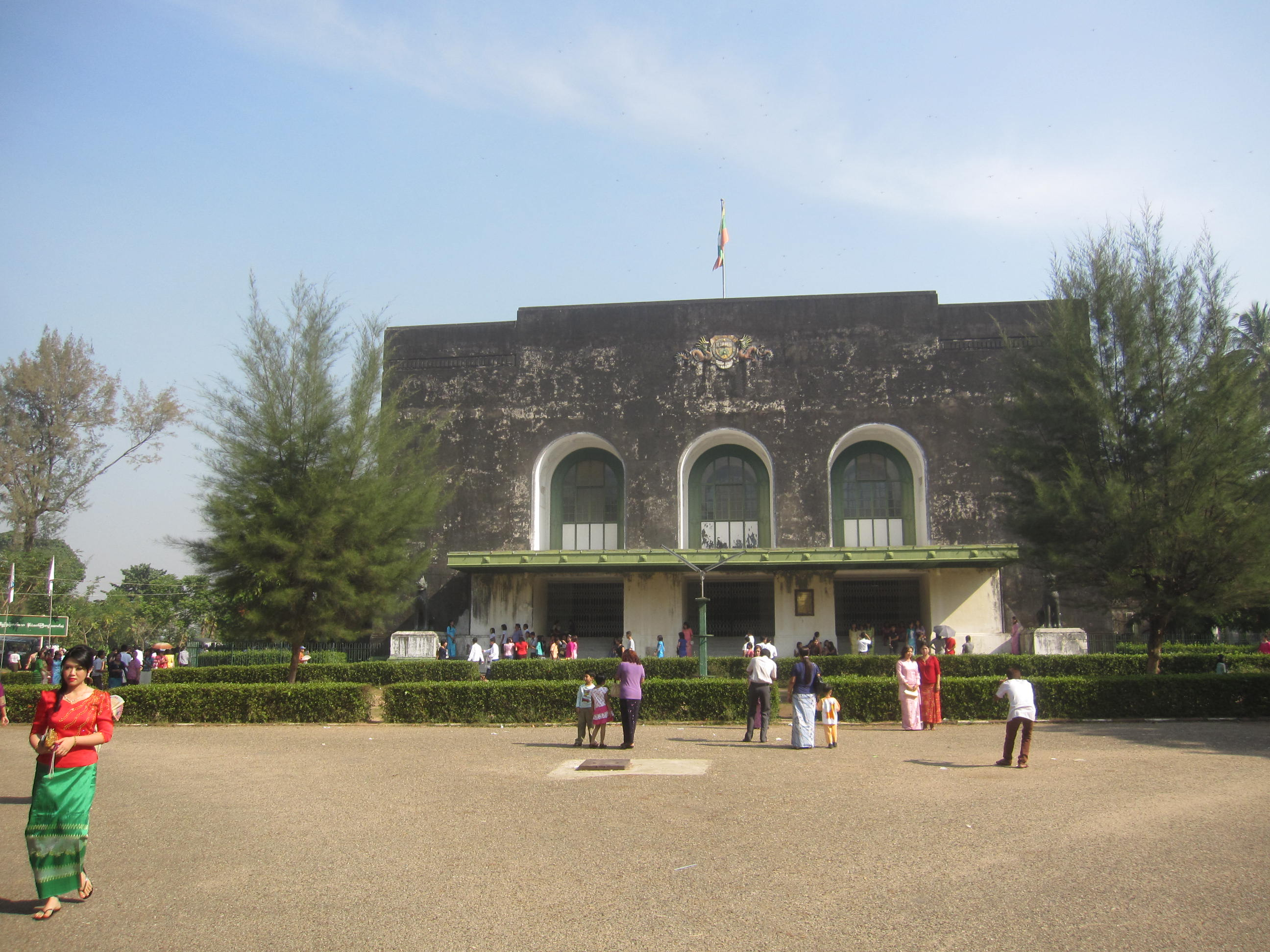
Convocation Hall

Structure	Type	Address	Notes
Judson Chapel	Church	Yangon University Estate	
Universities Buddhist Center (Dhammayon)		University Avenue	
Universities Sanatorium		University Avenue	
Yangon University Arts Hall	University	Yangon University Estate	
Yangon University Ava Hall	University dormitory	Yangon University Estate	
Yangon University Bago Hall	University dormitory	Yangon University Estate	
Yangon University Convocation Hall	University	Yangon University Estate	
Yangon University Dagon Hall	University dormitory	Yangon University Estate	
Yangon University Inya Hall	University dormitory	Yangon University Estate	
Yangon University Nawaday Hall	University dormitory	Thaton Lane	
Yangon University Pinya Hall	University dormitory	Yangon University Estate	
Yangon University Pyay Hall	University dormitory	Pyay Road	
Yangon University Sagaing Hall	University dormitory	Yangon University Estate	
Yangon University Sciences Hall	University	Yangon University Estate	
Yangon University Sciences Hall	University	Yangon University Estate	
Yangon University Shwebo Hall	University dormitory	Yangon University Estate	
Yangon University Tagaung Hall	University dormitory	Pyay Road	
Yangon University Thaton Hall	University dormitory	Yangon University Estate	
Yangon University Thiri Hall	University dormitory	Yangon University Estate	

== Kyauktada ==
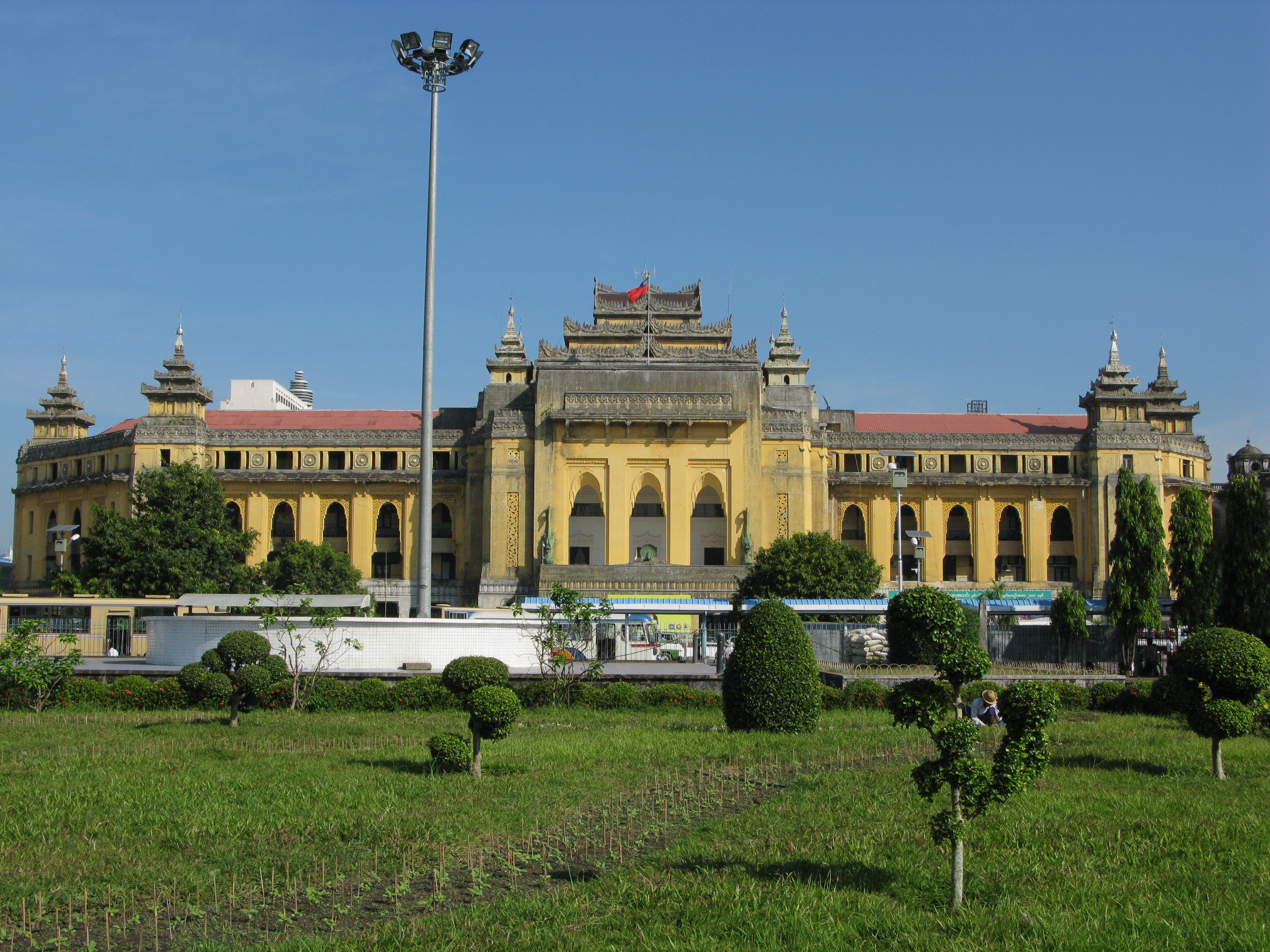
Yangon City Hall

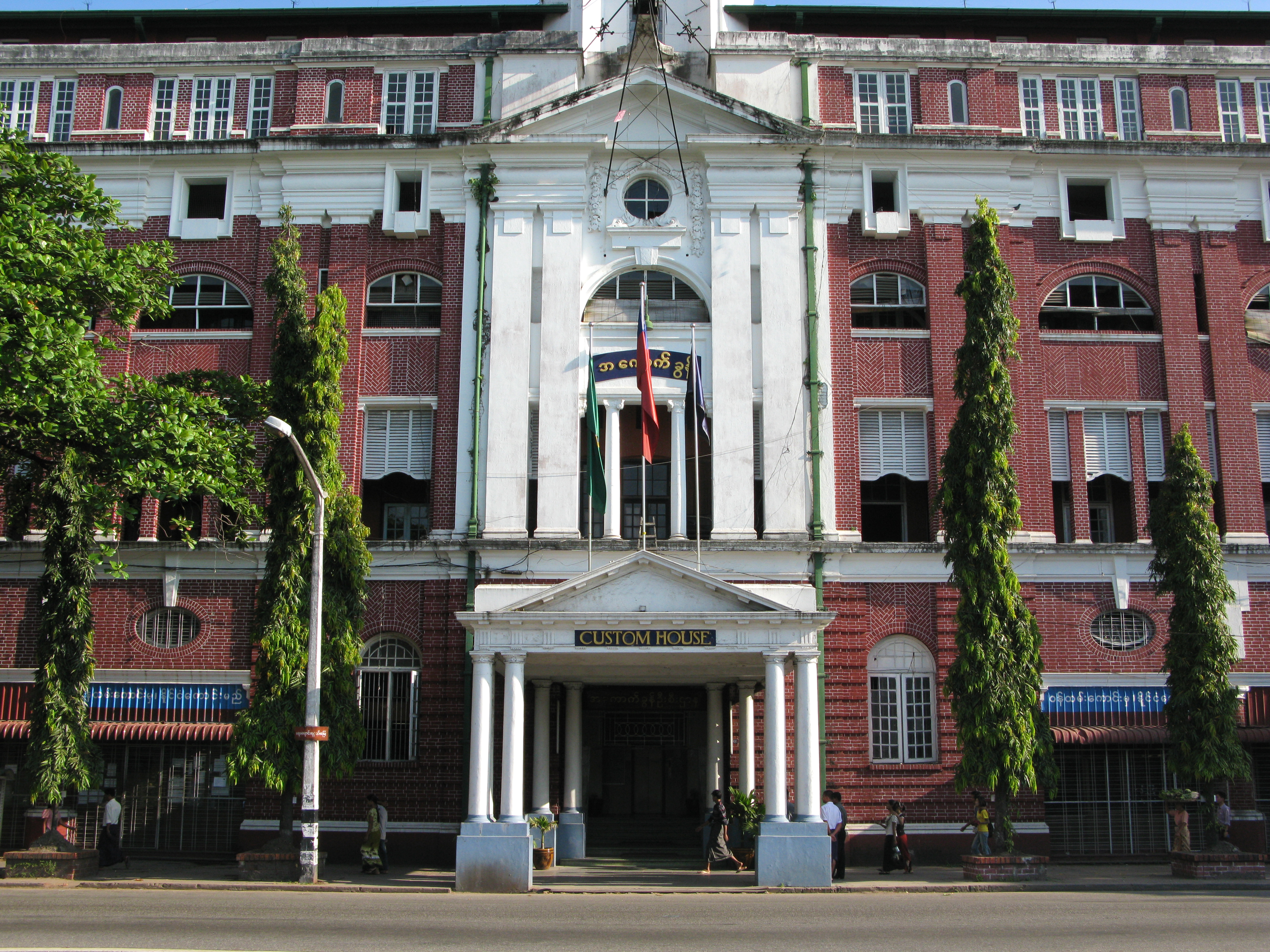
Custom House

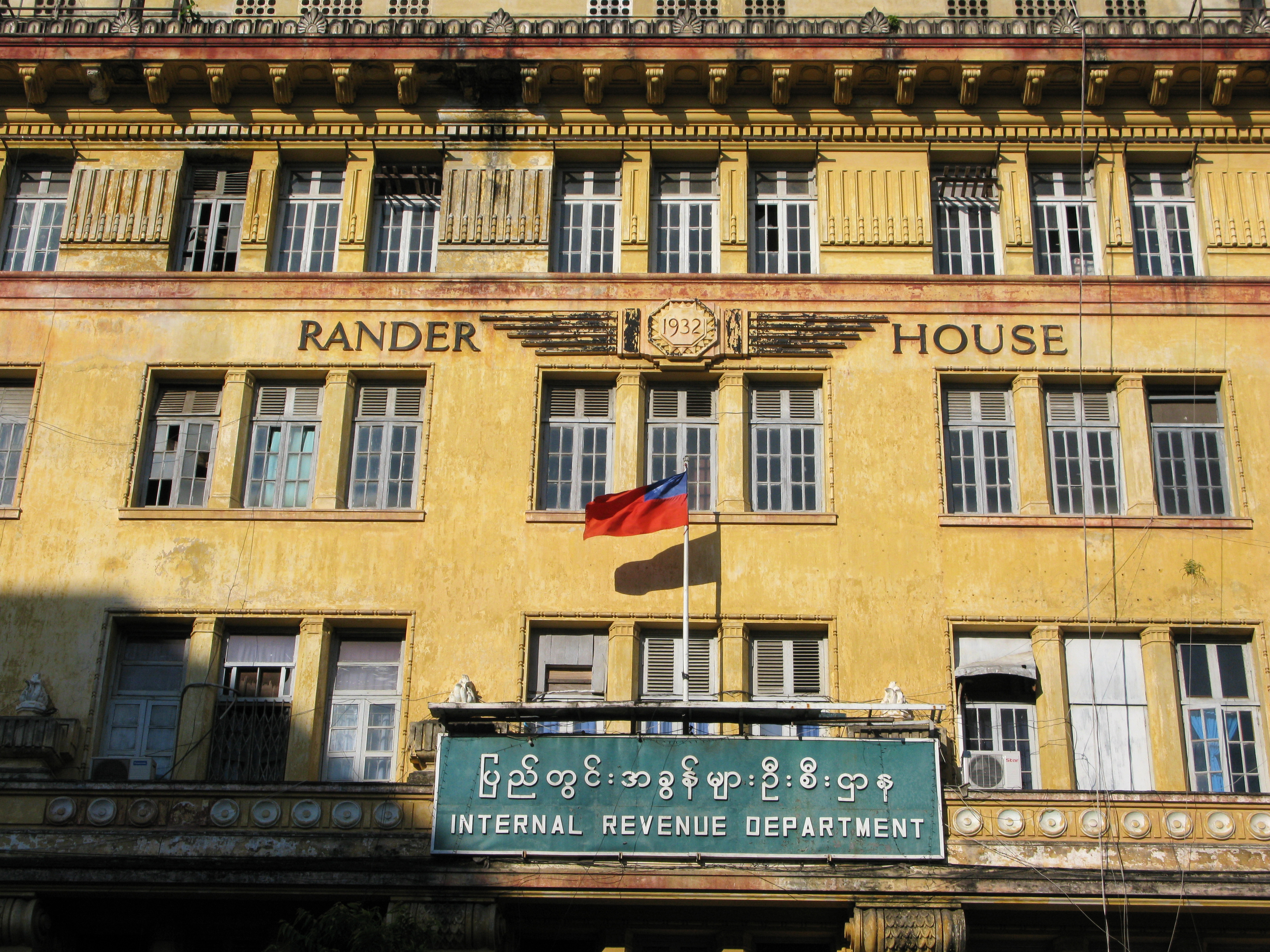
Rander House, Department of Internal Revenue

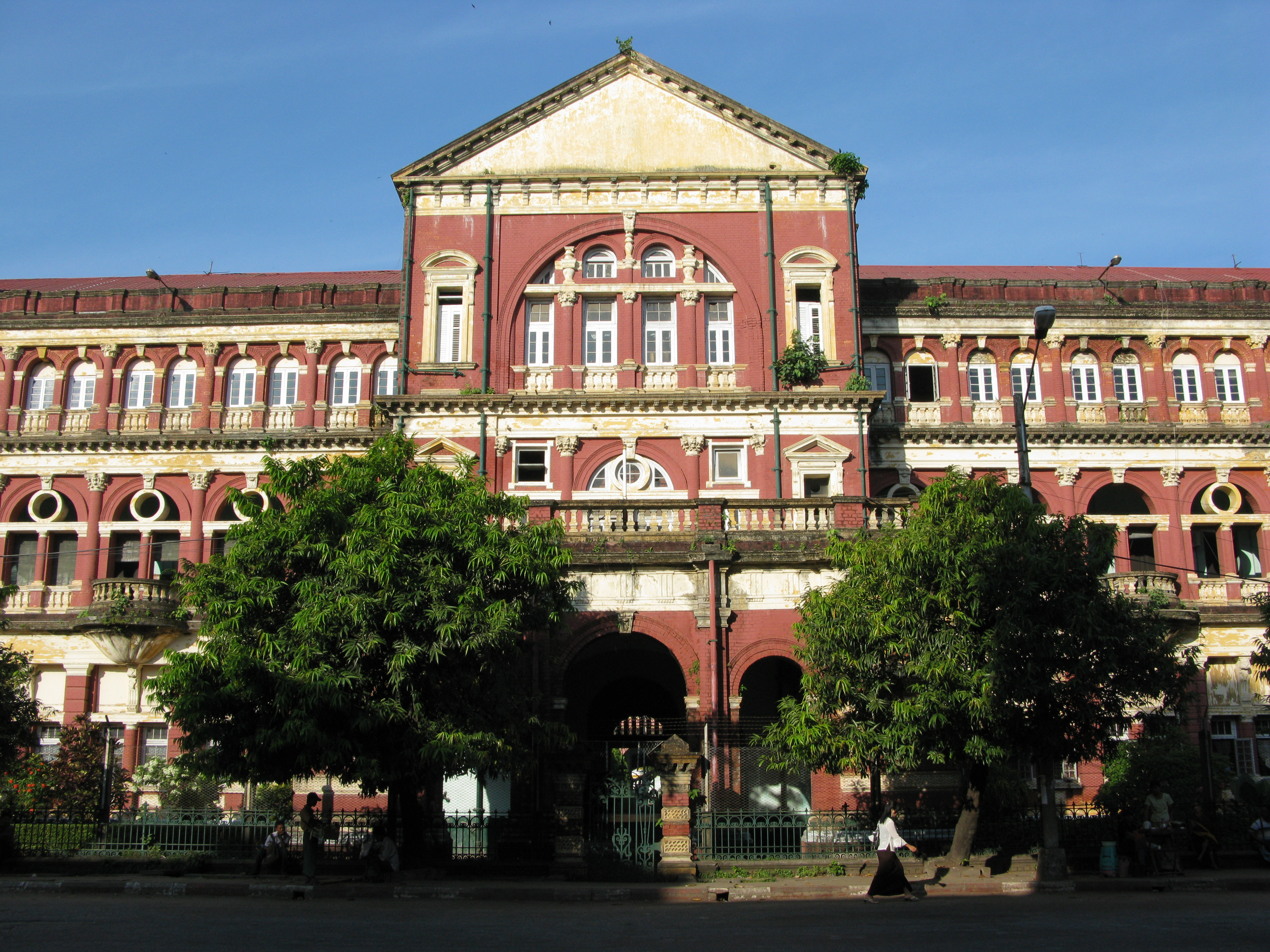
Burmese High Court

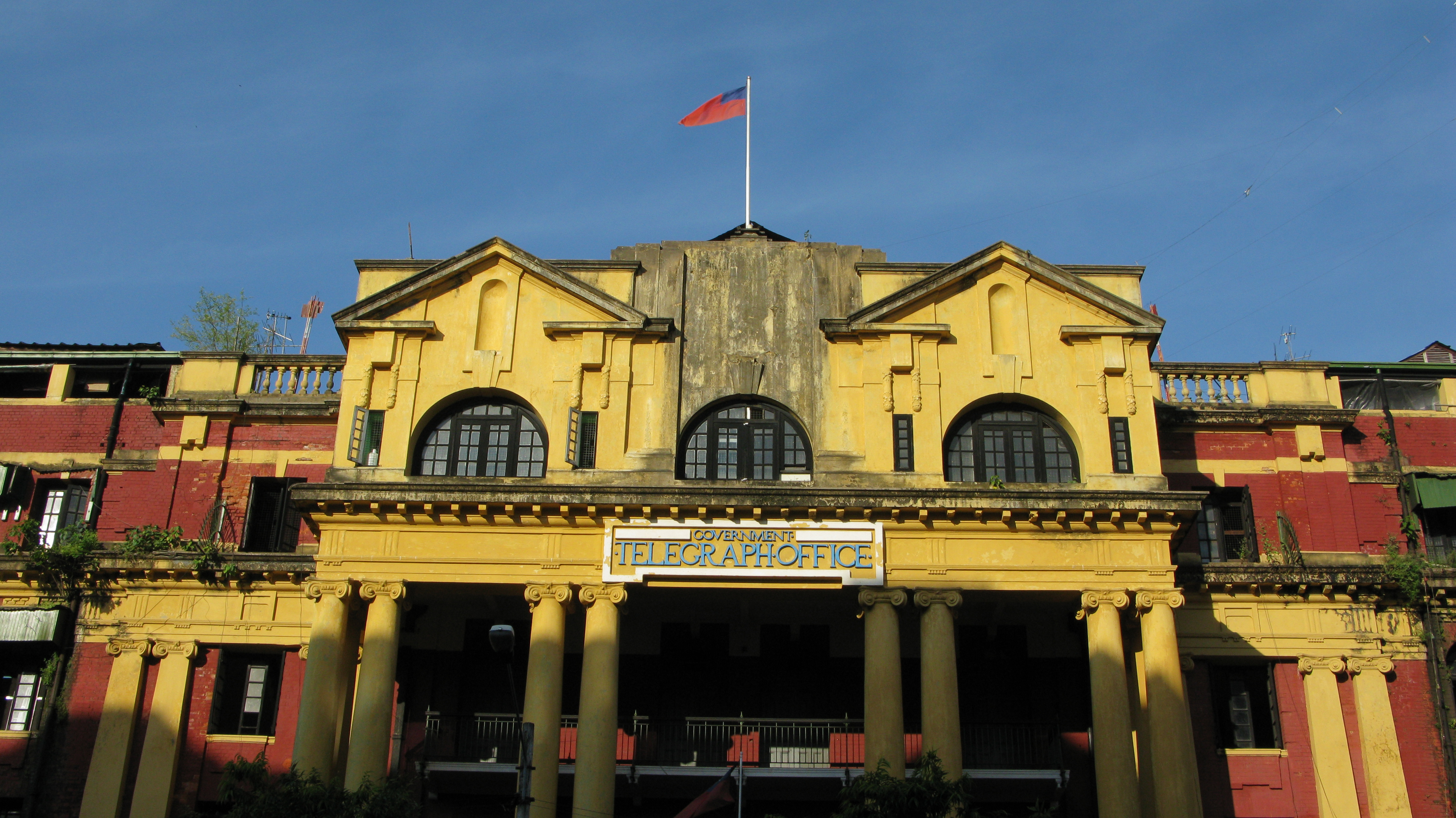
Central Telegraph Office

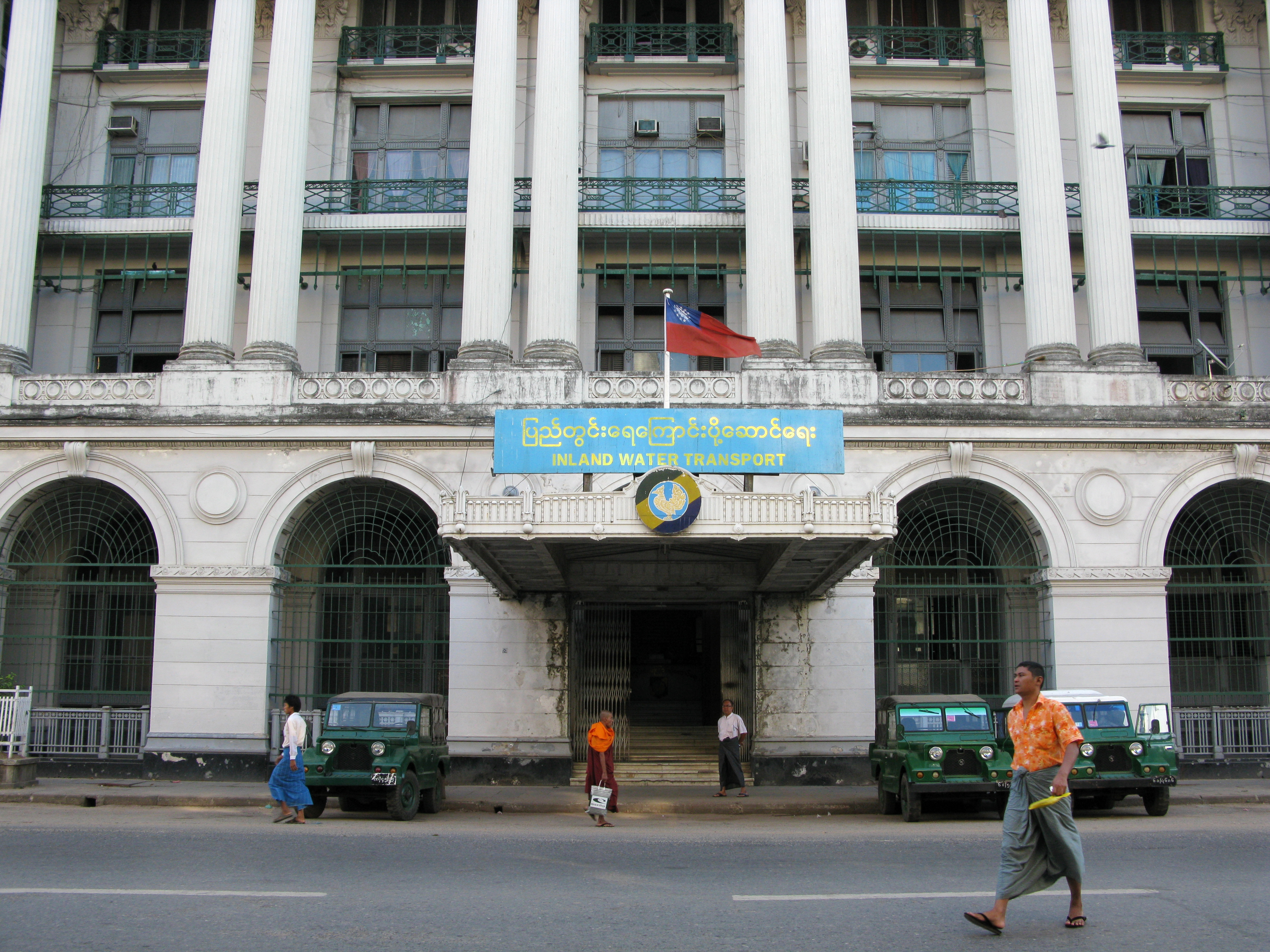
Inland Water Transport Building

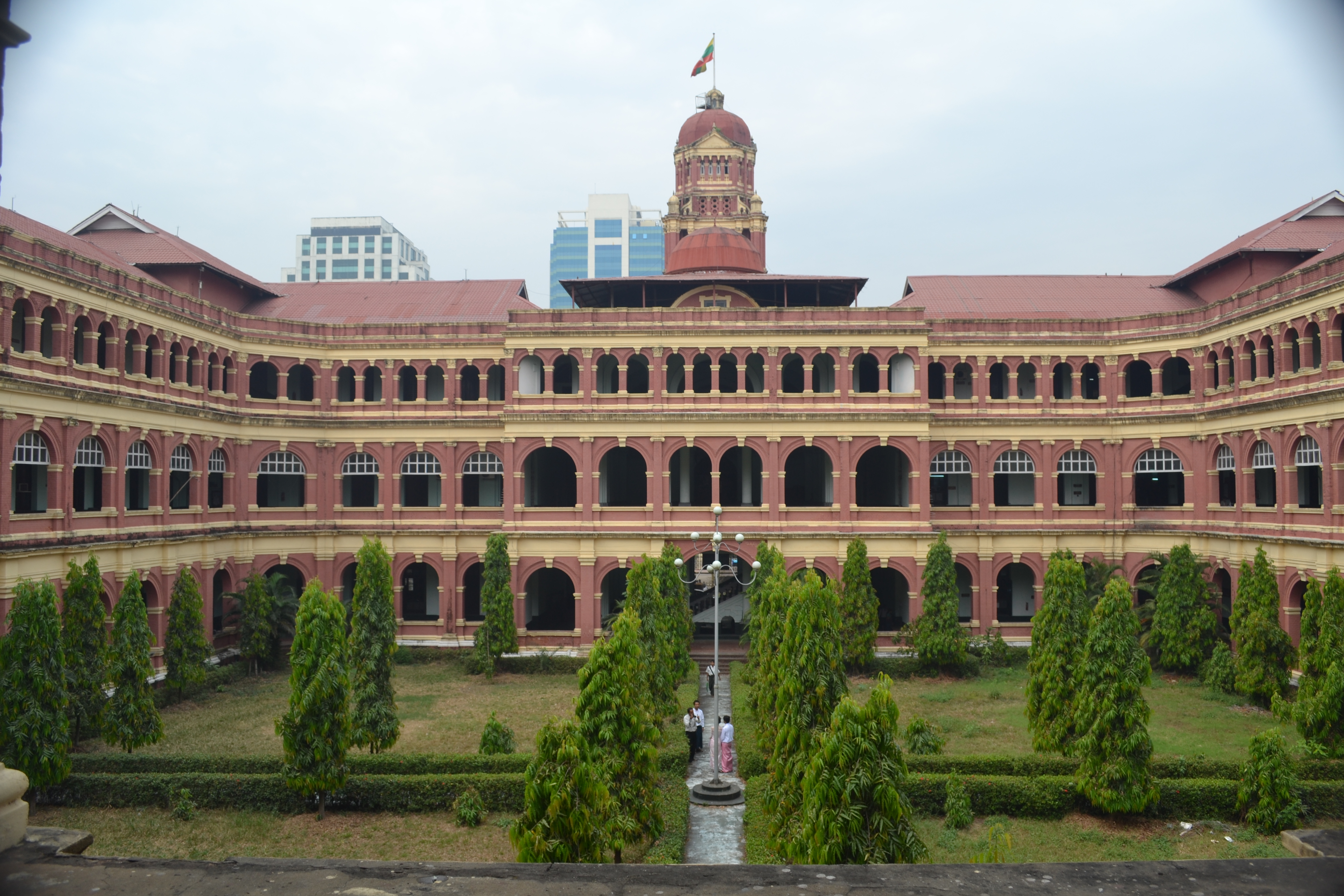
High Court

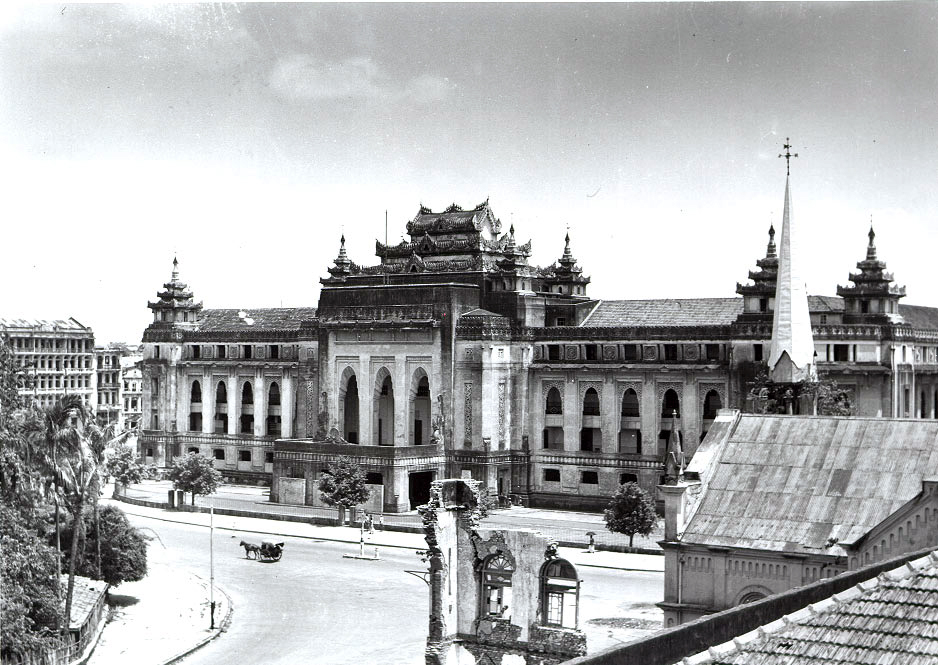
City Hall

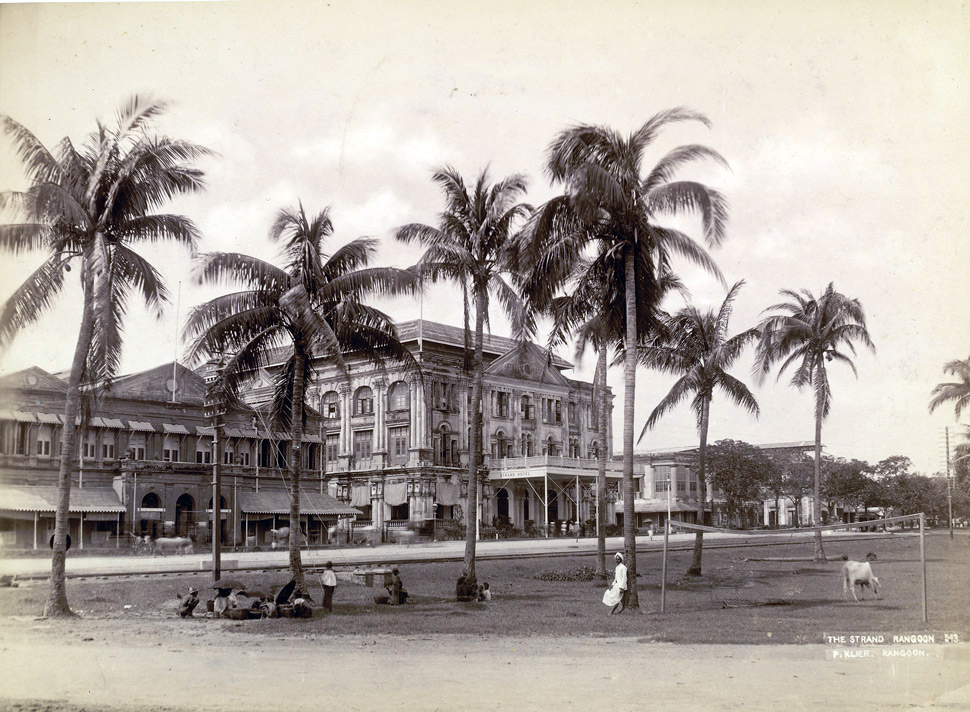
Strand Hotel

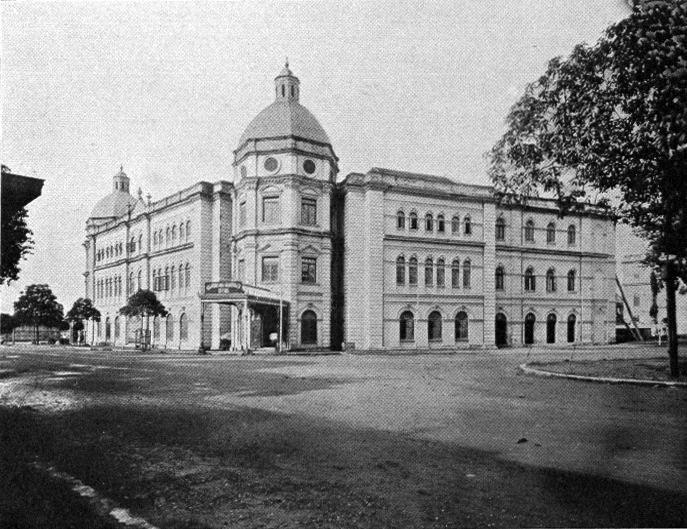
Yangon Divisional Court (Civil)

Structure	Type	Address	Notes
Yangon Stock Exchange	Government office	24-26 Sule Pagoda Road	Former Reserve Bank of India building, built in 1936.
Central Fire Station	Government office	137-139 Sule Pagoda Road	Formerly the Rangoon Municipality Central Fire Station.
General Post Office		39-41 Bo Aung Kyaw Road (and Merchant Road)	
Central Naval Hydrographic Depot	Government office	55-61 Strand Road	
City Hall	Government office	Maha Bandula Road	Built in 1927.
Custom House		132 Strand Road	Built in 1916 by John Begg.
Immanuel Baptist Church (Yangon, Myanmar)	Church	411 Maha Bandula Garden Street (and Maha Bandula Road)	
Department of Fire Services	Government office	127-133 Sule Pagoda Road	
Department of Information and Public Relations	Government office	22-24 Pansodan Road	
Department of Immigration and Registration	Government office	416 Maha Bandula Garden Street (and Maha Bandula Road)	
Department of Internal Revenue	Government office	55-61 Pansodan Road	Formerly the Rander House, built in 1936.
Department of Labour	Government office	138-158 Pansodan Road (and Maha Bandula Road)	
Department of Pensions	Government office	27 Bank Street	
Embassy of Australia	Embassy	88 Strand Road	
Embassy of India	Embassy	545-547 Merchant Road (and 36th Street)	Formerly the Oriental Life Assurance Building, built in 1914.
Embassy of UK	Embassy	80 Strand Road	Former headquarters of the Scottish firm J&F Graham & Company, Built in 1900.
Embassy of USA	Embassy	581 Merchant Road	
High Court Building	Court	89-133 Pansodan Road	Former High Court building, built in 1911 by James Ransome.
Inland Water Transport		44-54 Pansodan Road	Formerly the Irrawaddy Flotilla Company headquarters, built in 1933.
Methodist Church	Church	239 Seikkantha Road	
Ministry of Hotel and Tourism	Government office	77-91 Sule Pagoda Road	Formerly the Fytche Square Building
Myanma Agricultural and Village Tract Development Bank		526-532 Merchant Road	Formerly the A. Scott & Company Building, built in 1902.
Myanma Economic Bank	Government office	564 Maha Bandula Garden Street (and Merchant Road)	
Myanma Economic Bank Branch-2 and Savings Bank Branch-4	Government office	27-41 Pansodan Road	Formerly the Bibby Line Building.
Myanma Economic Bank Branch-3	Government office	15-19 Sule Pagoda Road (and Strand Road)	Formerly the Bank of Bengal, built in 1914.
Myanma Export Import Enterprise	Government office	579 Merchant Road (and Maha Bandula Garden Street)	
Myanma Insurance	Government office	142-144 Sule Pagoda Road	
Myanma Industrial Development Bank	Government office	26-42 Pansodan Road	
Myanma Insurance (Fire & Engineering)	Government office	128-132 Pansodan Road	
Myanma Posts and Telecommunications	Government office	125-133 Pansodan Road (and Maha Bandula Road)	Former Central Telegraph Office. Built in 1917 by John Begg.
Myanma Port Authority	Government office	2-20 Pansodan Road	Built in 1920.
Science & Technology Division, Cybermec		550-552 Merchant Road	
Strand Hotel	Hotel	92 Strand Road	Built in 1896.
Sule Pagoda	Pagoda	Sule Pagoda Road	
Sunni Jamah Bengali Mosque	Mosque	93 Sule Pagoda Road	
Surti Sunni Jamah Mosque	Mosque	224-228 35th Street	
Yangon Division Office Complex	Government office	56-66 Bank Street	Old Police Commissioner's Office
Yangon Division Statistics Office	Government office	22-34 Bank Street	
Yangon Divisional Court (Civil)	Court	1 Pansodan Road	Formerly the Accountant-General's Office.

== Kyimyindaing ==
Structure	Type	Address	Notes
Ohnbindan Sunni Jamahh Mosque	Mosque	1-11 Ohnbin Lane	
St. Michael's Church	Church	153 Upper Kyimyindaing Road	
Salin Monastery Ordination Hall	Monastery	Panbingyi Lane	

== Lanmadaw ==
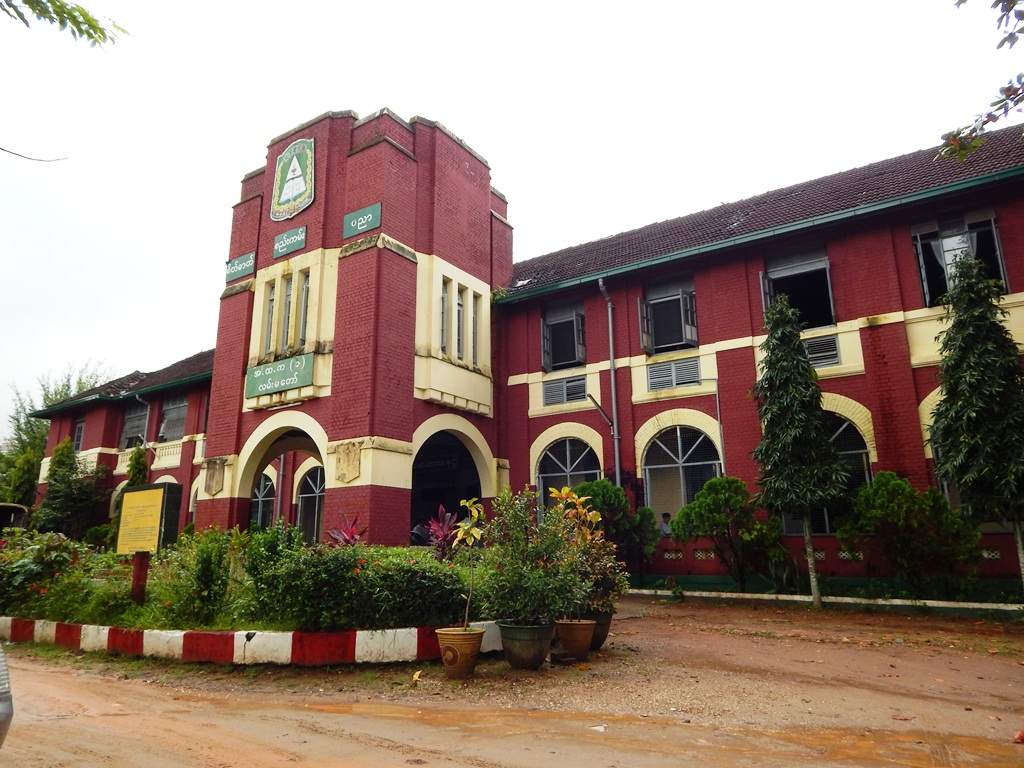
BEHS 1 Lanmadaw

Structure	Type	Address	Notes
BEHS 1 Lanmadaw	School	120–140 Minye Kyawswa Street	Former St. John's High School
BEPS 6 Lanmadaw	School	183–185 Lanmadaw Road	
Hashin Casin Patil Trust Mosque	Mosque	61–63 Wardan Street	
Lanmadaw Township Office of Electrical Engineers	Office	568 Strand Road	
Myanmar Baptist Church Union	Church	143 Minye Kyawswa Street	
University of Medicine 1, Yangon Lanmadaw Campus	University	245 Lanmadaw Road	Formerly Rangoon College, built in 1927.
Yangon Central Women's Hospital	Hospital	Minye Kyawswa Street	Former Dufferin Hospital

== Latha ==
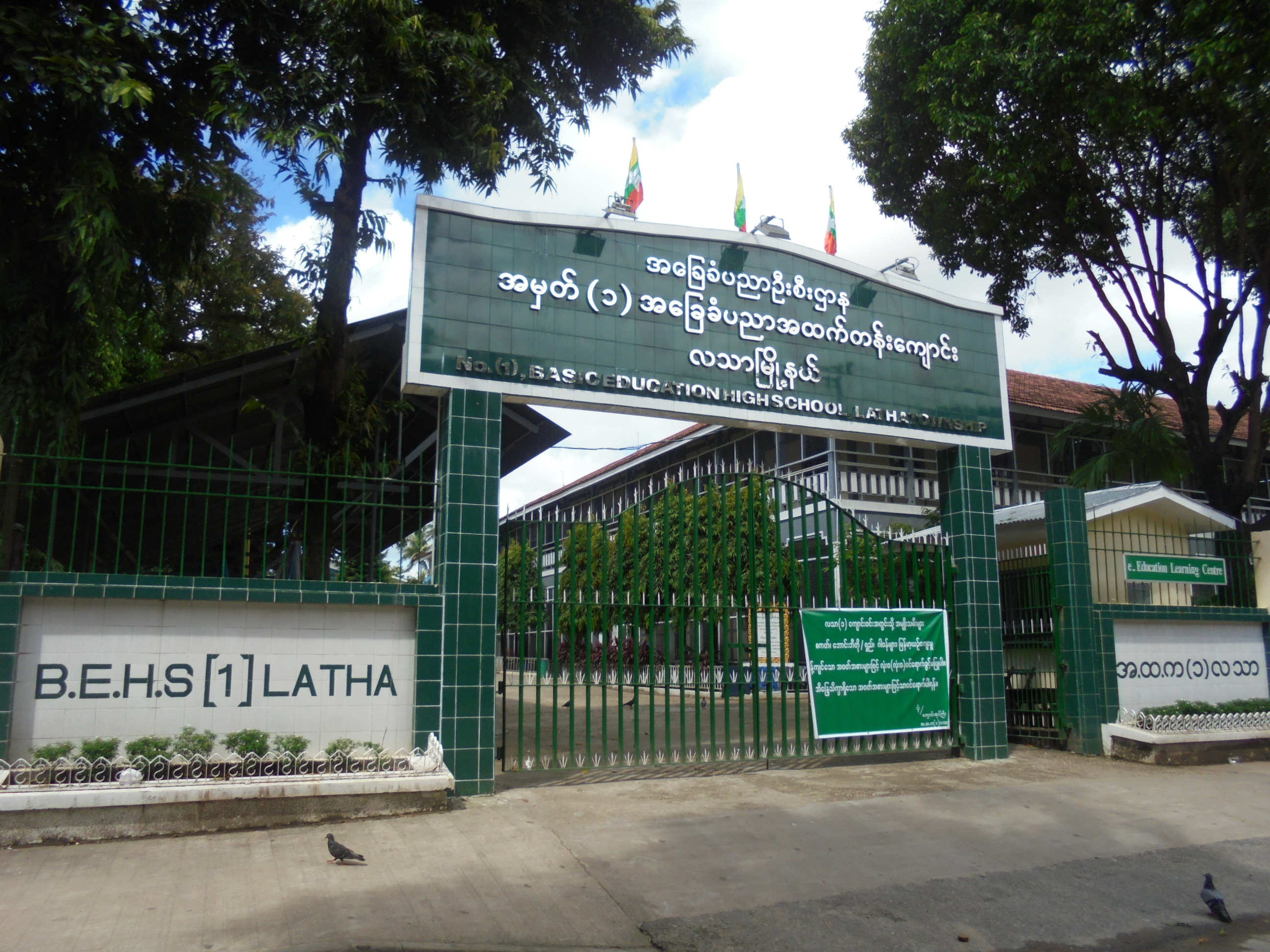
BEHS 1 Latha

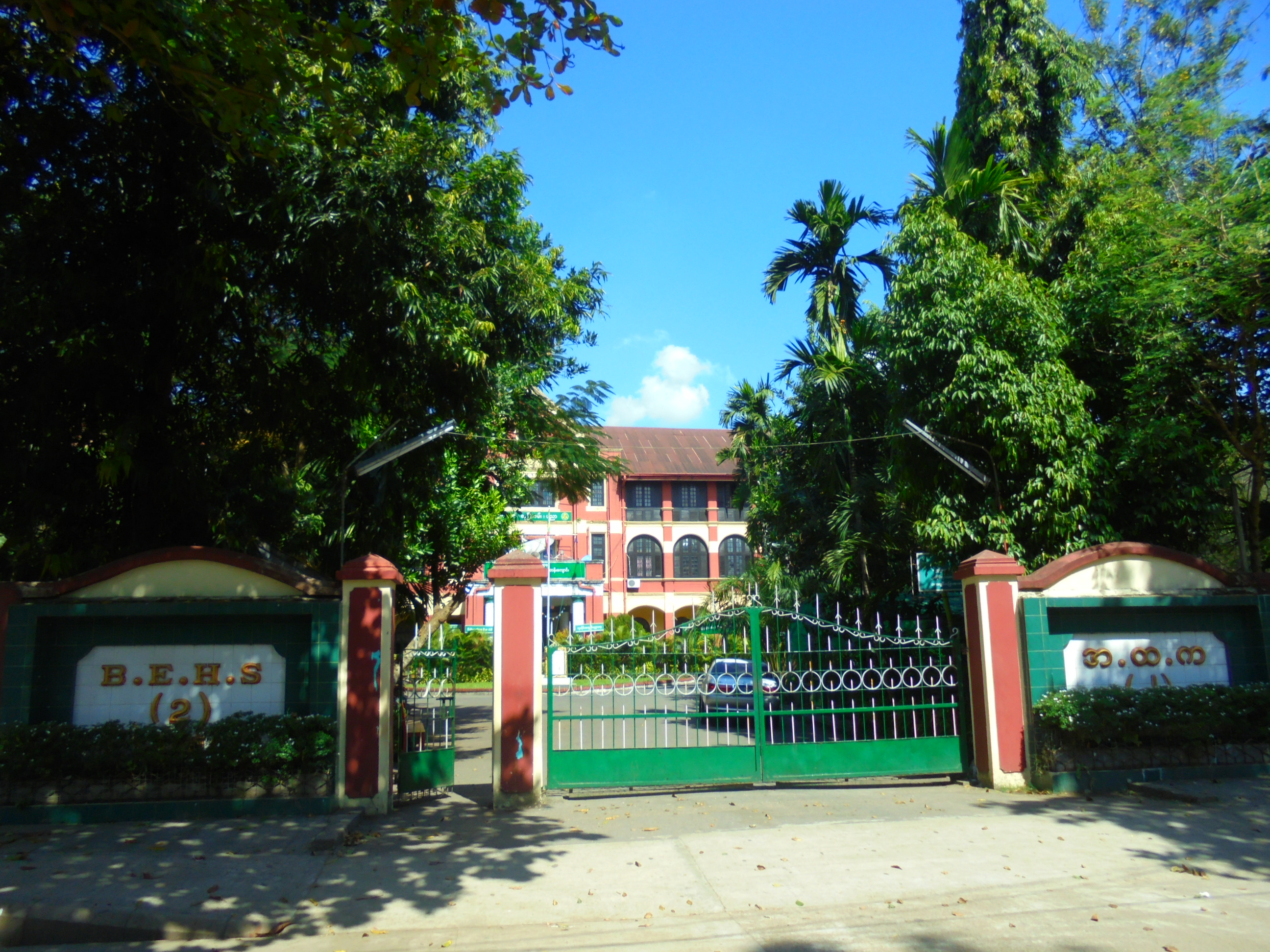
BEHS 2 Latha

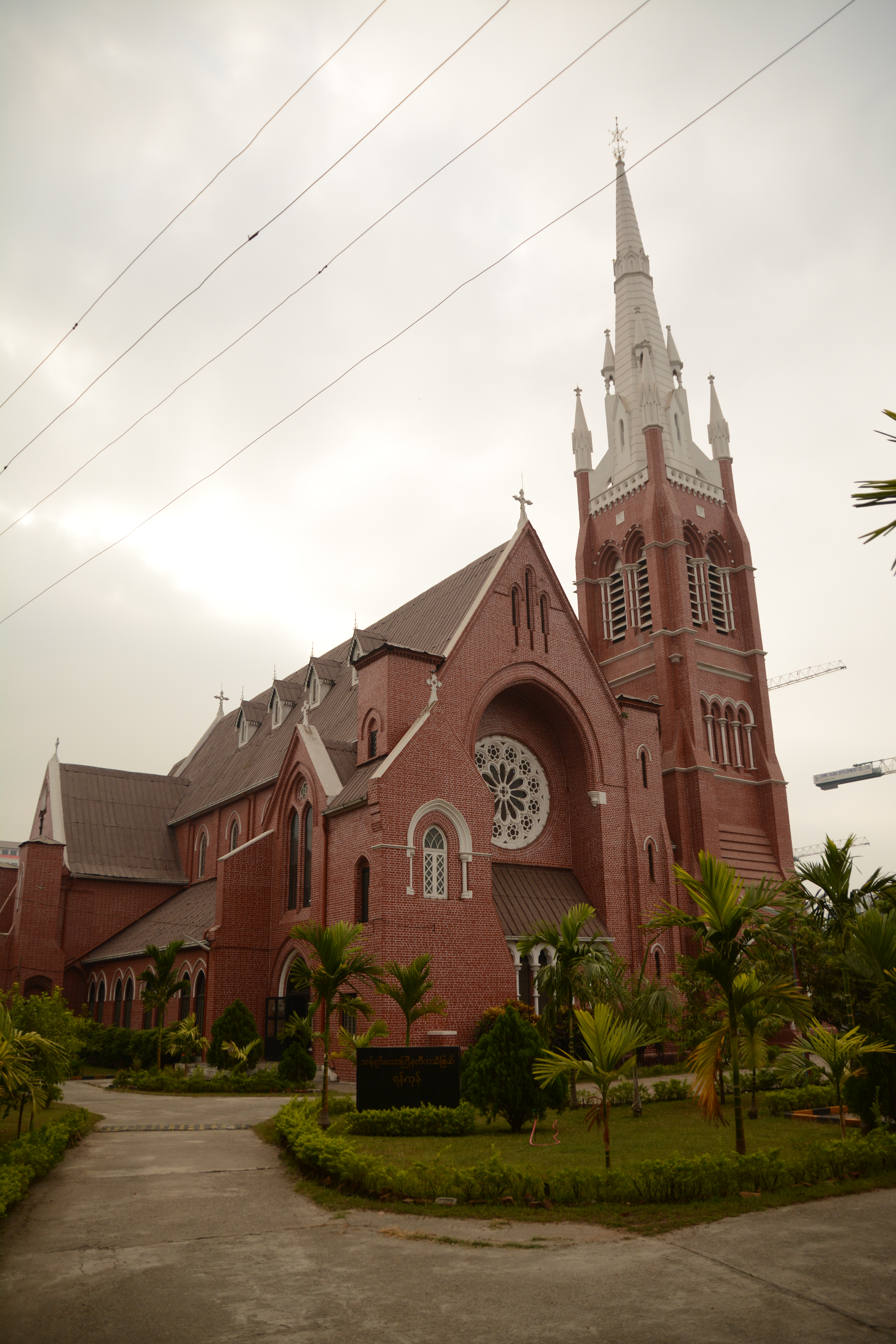
Holy Trinity Cathedral

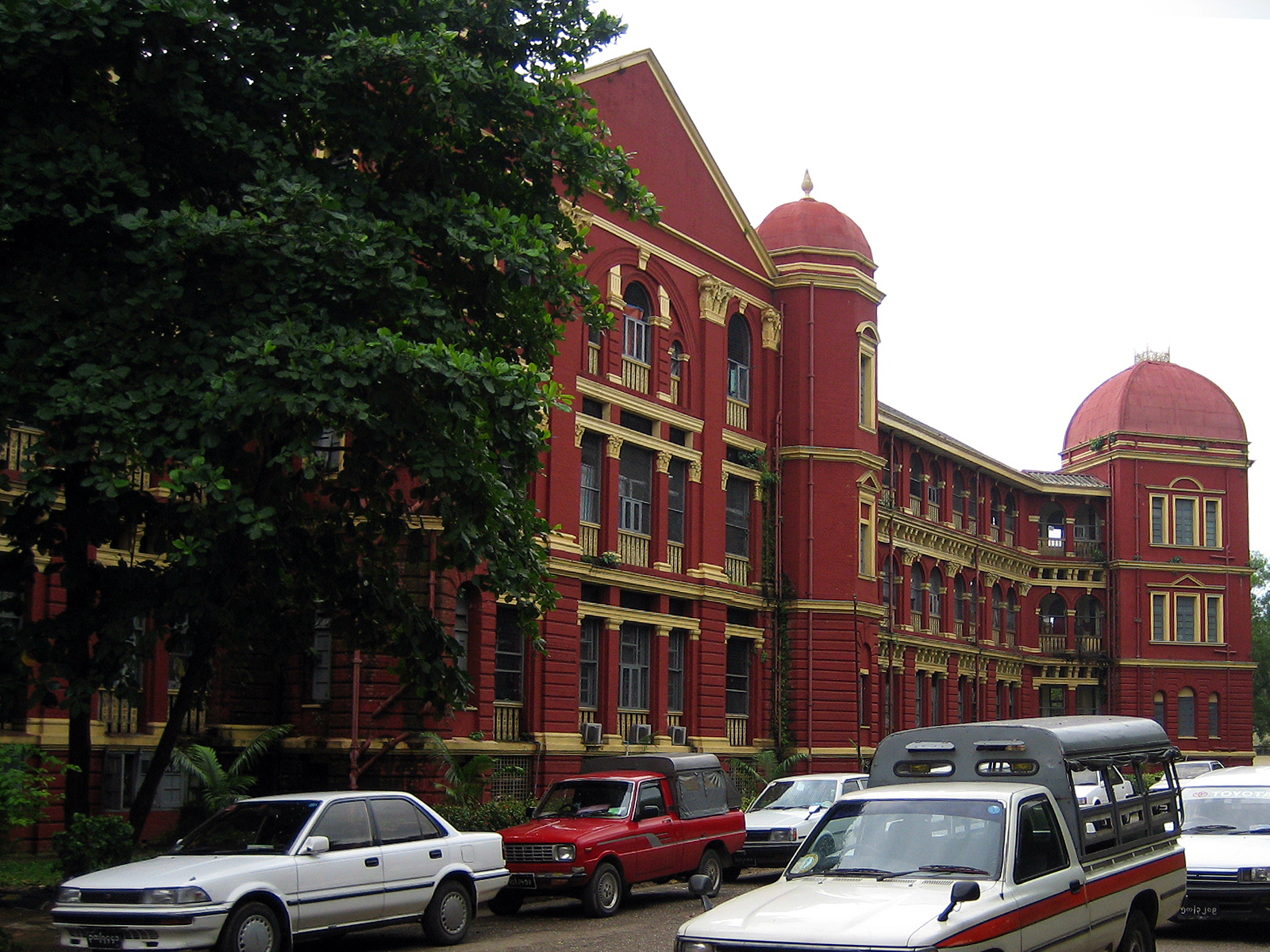
Yangon General Hospital

Structure	Type	Address	Notes
BEHS 1 Latha	School	270 Shwedagon Pagoda Road	Former Central High School
BEHS 2 Latha	School	112 Bogyoke Aung San Road	Former St. John's Convent School
Buddhist Great Ordination Hall	Buddhist Temple	550 Maha Bandula Road	
Cholia Darga Mosque	Mosque	239 29th Street	
Cholia Jamah Mosque	Mosque	114 Bo Sun Pet Street (Corner of Maha Bandula Road)	
Fu Zin Kan Hou Temple	Chinese Buddhist Temple	426-432 Strand Road (Corner of Sinohdan Road)	
Guangdong Guanyin Temple	Chinese Buddhist Temple	668 Maha Bandula Road (Corner of Latha Road)	
Holy Trinity Cathedral	Church	446 Bogyoke Aung San Road	
Jain Temple	Jain Temple	76-78 29th Street	
Jewish Synagogue	Synagogue	85 26th Street	
Liao San Tao Temple	Chinese Buddhist Temple	53-55 Anawrahta Road	
Maha Peinne Hindu Temple	Hindu Temple	149 24th Street	
Mughal Shia Mosque	Mosque	91 30th Street	
Myanma Department Store	Office	19-43 Bo Soon Pet Street	
Myanma Economic Bank Branch 4	Office	625 Merchant Road (Corner of 30th Street)	
Myanma Oil and Gas Enterprise (MOGE) Headquarters	Office	604-608 Merchant Road	
Myanma Post and Telecommunications Accounts Office	Office	465-469 Maha Bandula Road	
St. John's Catholic Church	Church	368 Bo Sun Pet Street	
Sri Kalima Hindu Temple	Hindu Temple	295 Konzedan Road	
Sri Kamichi Hindu Temple	Hindu Temple	375 Bogyoke Aung San Road (Corner of Bo Sun Pet Street)	
Sri Satanarayan Hindu Temple	Hindu Temple	23 29th Street	
Yangon General Hospital	Hospital	Bogyoke Aung San Road	

== Mayangon ==
Structure	Type	Address	Notes
Aung Shwebontha Dhamma Beikman Monastery	Monastery	9 Mile Junction, Pyay Road	
Kaba Aye Pagoda	Pagoda	Kaba Aye Pagoda Road	
Kyaik Kale Pagoda	Pagoda	Yangon-Pyay Road	
Kyaik Kalo Pagoda	Pagoda	Yangon-Pyay Road	
Kyaik Waing Pagoda	Pagoda	Kyaik Waing Pagoda Road	
St. Edward's Roman Catholic Church	Church	Yangon-Pyay Road	
St. George's Anglican Church	Church	Yangon-Pyay Road	
Tatmadaw Orthopedic Hospital	Hospital	Yangon-Pyay Road	Former military officers training school

== Mingala Taungnyunt ==
Structure	Type	Address	Notes
Bethlehem Lutheran Church	Church	181-183 Theinbyu Road	
Kandawgalay Mosque	Mosque	106 Upper Pansodan Road	
Methodist Association Headquarters	Church	20-22 Alanpyapaya Road	
St. Anthony's Church	Church	24 Upper Pansodan Road	
Sri Hanuman Temple	Hindu Temple	21 Kanyeiktha Lane	
Sri Marian Temple	Hindu Temple	Corner of Daw Thein Tin Lane and 94th Street	
Sri Nagarthan Sulamani Hindu Temple	Hindu Temple	57 Factory Lane	
Three-Corner Mosque	Mosque	35 Upper Pansodan Road	
Yangon Central railway station	Railway station	Kunchan Lane	

== North Okkalapa ==
Structure	Type	Address	Notes
Meilamu Pagoda	Pagoda	Thudhamma Road	

== Pabedan ==
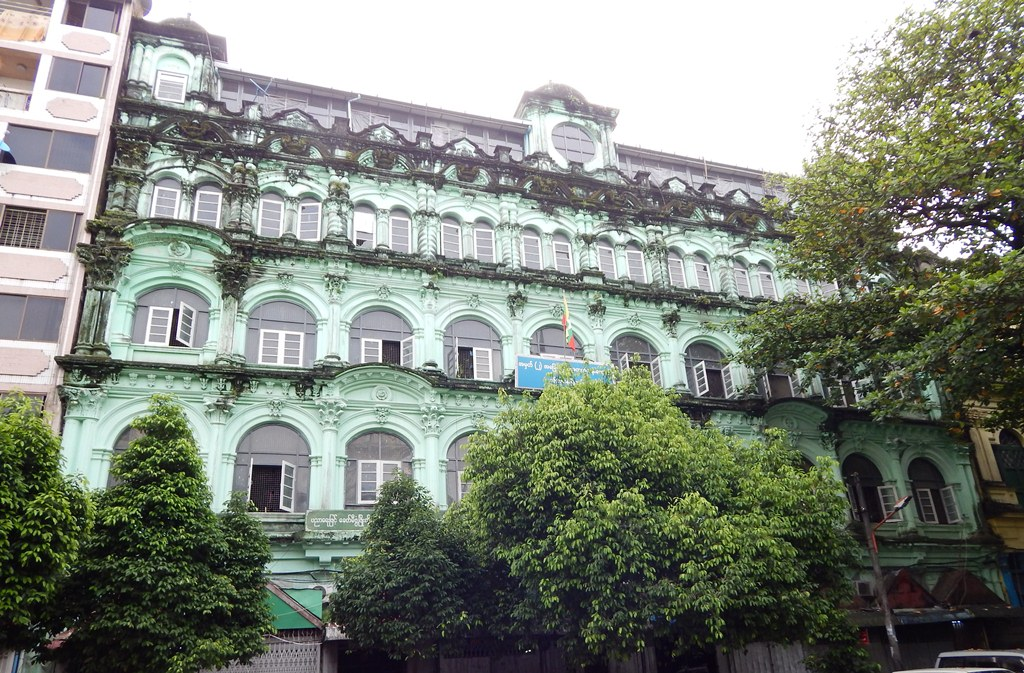
BEHS 2 Pabedan

Structure	Type	Address	Notes
BEHS 2 Pabedan	School	124–142 Shwebontha Road	
Bogyoke Aung San Market	Market	Bogyoke Aung San Road	
Gulam Arif Masjit Waqf Mosque	Mosque	62–64 Lanmadaw Road	
Former Life Insurance Corporation of India Building	Office	654 Merchant Road (corner of Shwebontha Road)	
Nausaripuri Mosque	Mosque	281 Shwebontha Road	
Former Myanmar Railways Headquarters	Office	Corner of Bogyoke Aung San Road and Sule Pagoda Road	
Sri Mugaparumen Hindu Temple	Temple	112–122 Shwebontha Road	
Surti Sunni Jamah Mosque	Mosque	149 Shwebontha Road	

== Pazundaung ==
Structure	Type	Address	Notes
Maha Vishnu Temple	Hindu Temple	137-139 51st Street	
Methodist Church	Church	256 Bo Myat Tun Road	
Shwebonpwint Pagoda	Pagoda	U Shwe Gone Street	
Sunni Mosque of Eastern Yangon	Mosque	73 Anawrahta Road	

== Sanchaung ==
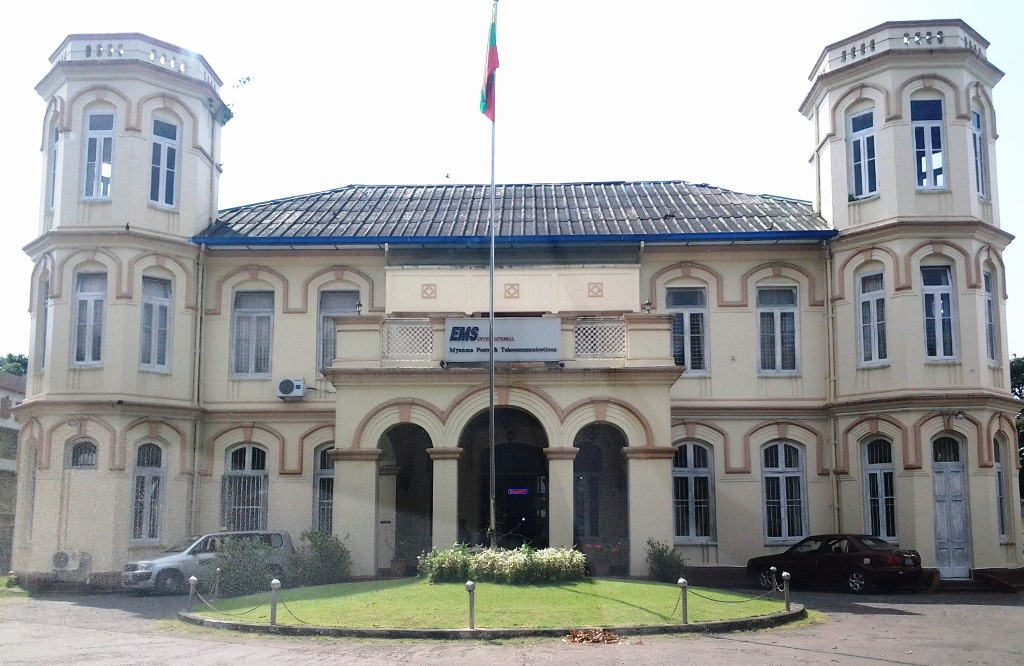
Sarpay Beikman House

Structure	Type	Address	Notes
Anglican Religious Training Center	Office	196 Kyundaw Lane	
BEHS 2 Sanchaung	School	29 Pyay Road	Former St. Philomena's High School
Catholic Bishops' Conference of Myanmar	Office	292-A Pyay Road	
Chinese Buddhist Nuns’ Temple	Temple	35 Tayok Kyaung Lane	
Kodatgyi Pagoda	Pagoda	Bagaya Lane	
Kyimyindaing railway station	Rail station	292-A Pyay Road	Kyimyindaing Railway Station Lane
Kyundaw Ordination Hall	Monastery		Bagaya Lane
Myenigon Jamah Mosque	Mosque	248 Bagaya Lane	
Okkyaung Bagaya Monastery	Monastery	241 U Wisara Lane	
Sarpay Beikman	Office	361 Pyay Road	
Weluwun Monastery	Monastery	Weluwun Lane	
Zeyawadi Monastery	Monastery	Zeyawadi Lane	

== Tamwe ==
Structure	Type	Address	Notes
M A Mamsa Mosque	Mosque	161 Kyaikkasan Road	
Masedi Khan Sunni Jamah Mosque	Mosque	356 Kyaikkasan Road	
St. Francis' Catholic Church	Church	131 Kyaikkasan Road	

== Thingangyun ==
Structure	Type	Address	Notes
Kyaikkasan Pagoda	Pagoda	Kyaikkasan Pagoda Road	
St. Joseph's Church	Church	1-3 Thiri Marla Road	
Thanyok Monastery	Monastery	Kyauksadaing Road	

== Yankin ==
Structure	Type	Address	Notes
Kalayana Temple (Zekwet Pagoda)	Temple	Dhammayon Road	
Mogaung Pagoda	Pagoda	Mogaung Pagoda Road (Corner of Dhmmayon Road)	
Nagalein Pagoda	Pagoda	Budayon Road	
Supramanayan Hindu Temple	Hindu Temple	Budayon Road	
