= Central Telegraph Office, Yangon =

Central Telegraph Office
- ဗဟိုကြေးနန်းရုံး
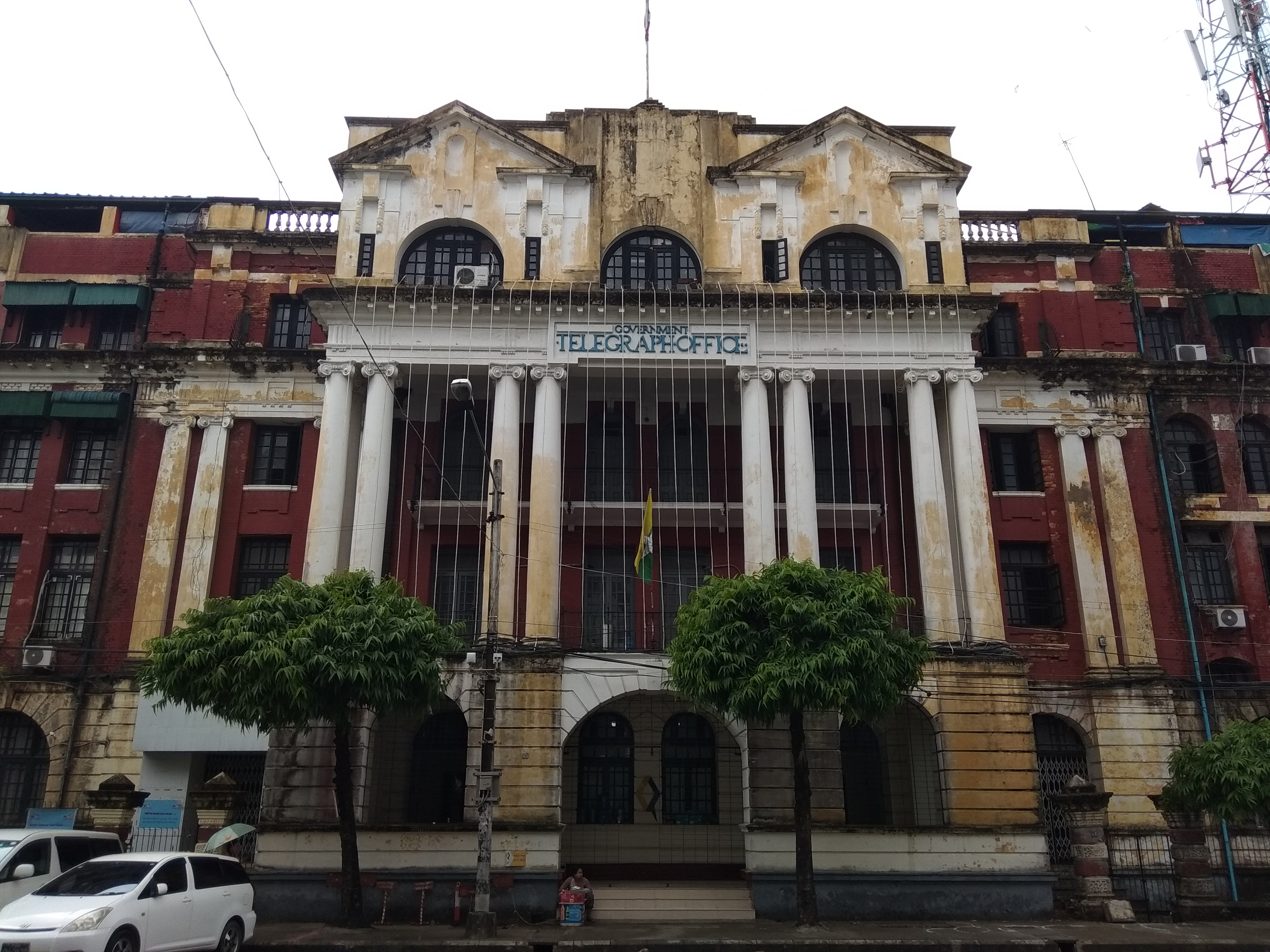
- Interactive map of the Central Telegraph Office area

General information
- Location: Yangon, Myanmar
- Coordinates: 16.774131°N 96.161312°E
- Completed: 1917

Design and construction
- Architect: John Begg

Central Telegraph Office (Burmese: ဗဟိုကြေးနန်းရုံး) is a colonial-era landmark in Yangon, Myanmar (formerly Rangoon, Burma), designated in the Yangon City Heritage List. The building, located on the corner of Pansodan and Maha Bandula Roads, now houses the a government office, Myanma Posts and Telecommunications (MPT).

Central Telegraph Office was designed by John Begg, a government architect who had also designed other colonial era buildings in the city, including Custom House on Strand Road, and the Printing and Publishing Enterprise building. Construction for the four-story, steel-framed building, took place between 1913 and 1917, delivered by Clark & Greig. For a time, the building also housed the Burma Broadcasting Service.
