= Custom House, Yangon =

Historical landmark in Yangon, Myanmar

Custom House
- အကောက်ခွန်ဦးစီးဌာန
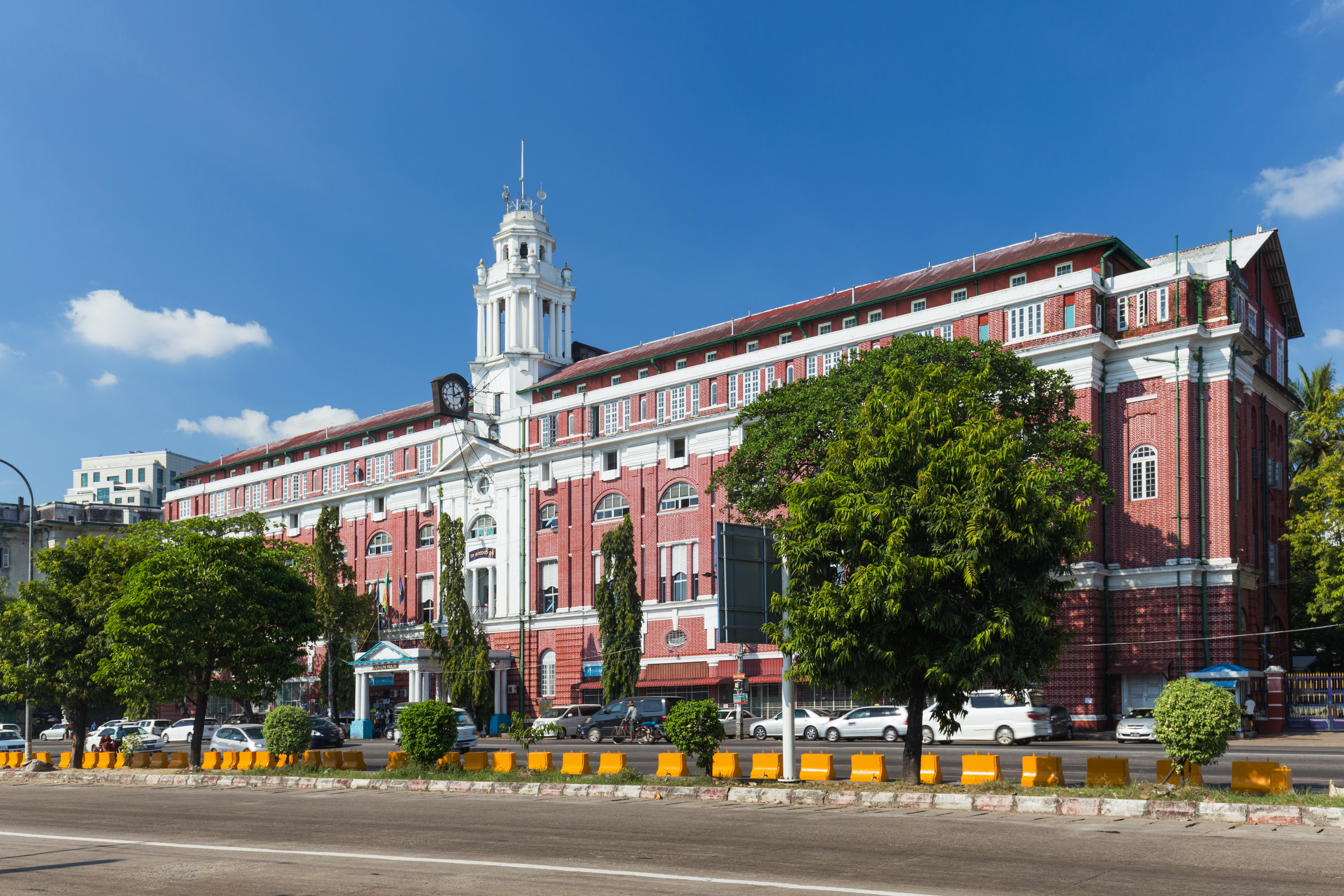
- Interactive map of the Custom House area

General information
- Location: Yangon, Myanmar
- Coordinates: 16.769805°N 96.160544°E
- Completed: 1916

Design and construction
- Architect: John Begg

Custom House, Yangon (Burmese: အကောက်ခွန်ဦးစီးဌာန) is a colonial-era landmark in Yangon, Myanmar (formerly Rangoon, Burma), designated in the Yangon City Heritage List. The building, located on Strand Road, facing the port area and its wharfs, continues to house the Burmese custom house.

Custom House was designed by Scottish architect John Begg, and built between 1912 and 1916. The building replaced a wooden customs house first constructed in 1853, following the end of the Second Anglo-Burmese War. Throughout the colonial era, the Customs House collected duties and excise taxes from commercial shipping, which represented an important revenue source for the colonial government.

The red-brick building is noted for its towering bracket clock and columned portico, adapted for tropical weather conditions.
