= Central Telegraph (disambiguation) =

Central Telegraph is a Russian telecommunications company.

Central Telegraph may also refer to:

- Central Telegraph (newspaper), a newspaper in Queensland, Australia
- Central Telegraph Office (disambiguation)
