= Central Telegraph Office =

Central Telegraph Office may refer to:

- Central Telegraph Office, Colombo, Sri Lanka
- Central Telegraph Office, Yangon, Myanmar
