= Basic Education High School No. 4 Botataung =

School in Yangon, Myanmar

Coordinates: 16°46′41.8″N 96°10′03.2″E

Botataung 4 High School အ.ထ.က. (၄) ဗိုလ်တထောင်
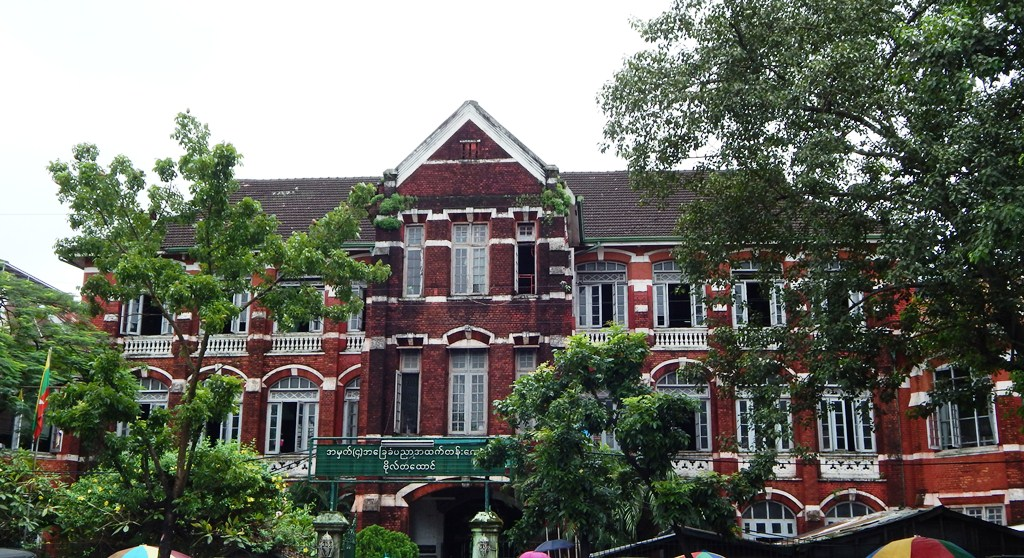

Location
- 300 Theinbyu Road; Yangon, Botataung, Yangon Region; Myanmar

Information
- Type: Public
- School number: 4
- Grades: K-10

Designations

Yangon City Landmark

Basic Education High School No. 4 Botataung (Burmese: အခြေခံ ပညာ အထက်တန်း ကျောင်း အမှတ် (၄) ဗိုလ်တထောင်; commonly known as Botataung 4 High School or St. Mary's Convent School), located in Botataung Township, is a public high school in Yangon. The building of the all-girls school is a landmark protected by the city, and is listed on the Yangon City Heritage List.
