= Basic Education High School No. 1 Insein =

Public high school in Yangon, Myanmar

Coordinates: 16°53′32.4″N 96°06′24.4″E

- အ.ထ.က. (၁) အင်းစိန်

Location
- Mingyi Road, Insein; Yangon, Yangon Region; Myanmar

Information
- Other name: Insein (1) High School
- Type: Public
- School number: 1
- Grades: G-11

Yangon City Landmark

Basic Education High School No. 1 Insein (Burmese: အခြေခံ ပညာ အထက်တန်း ကျောင်း အမှတ် (၁) အင်းစိန်; commonly known as Insein 1 High School) is a public high school in Insein township, Yangon, Myanmar. The school's main building is a landmark protected by the city, and is listed on the Yangon City Heritage List.
