= Basic Education High School No. 2 Botataung =

School in Yangon, Myanmar

Coordinates: 16°46′23.0″N 96°10′13.4″E

Botataung 2 High School အ.ထ.က. (၂) ဗိုလ်တထောင်
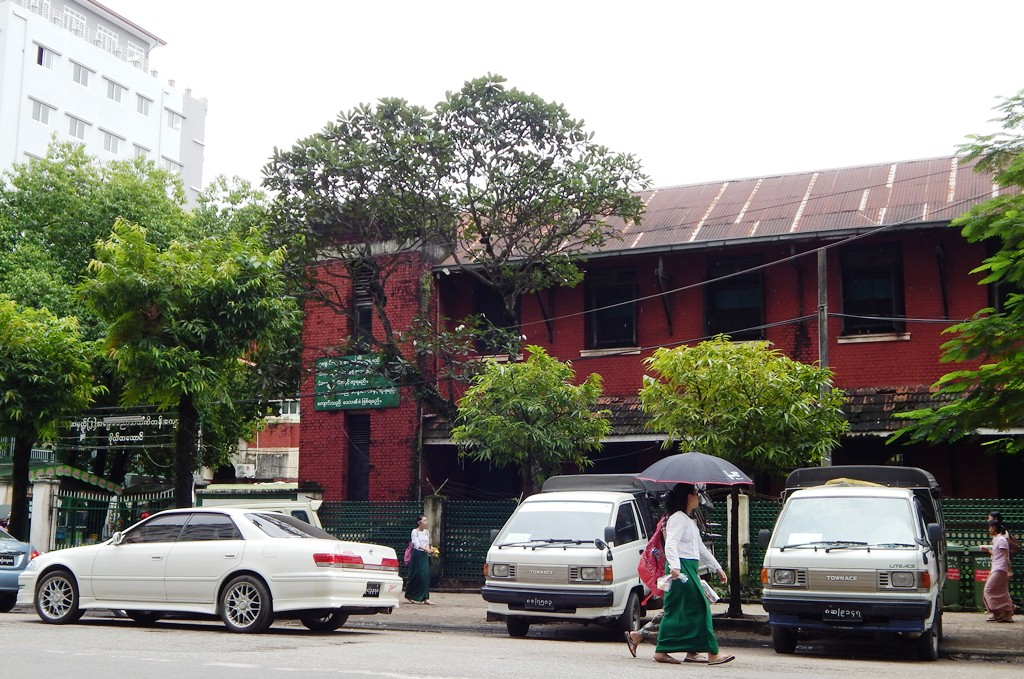

Location
- 146 Bo Myat Tun Road, Yangon, Botataung, Yangon Region; Myanmar

Information
- Type: Public
- Established: 1945
- School number: 2
- Grades: K-10

Designations

Yangon City Landmark

Basic Education High School No. 2 Botataung (Burmese: အခြေခံ ပညာ အထက်တန်း ကျောင်း အမှတ် (၂) ဗိုလ်တထောင်; commonly known as Botataung 2 High School or St. Philip's High School), located in Botataung Township, is a public high school in Yangon. The school's main building is a landmark protected by the city, and is listed on the Yangon City Heritage List.
