= Government Press Buildings =

Historic government building in Yangon, Myanmar

- ဗဟိုပုံနှိပ်စက်ရုံ
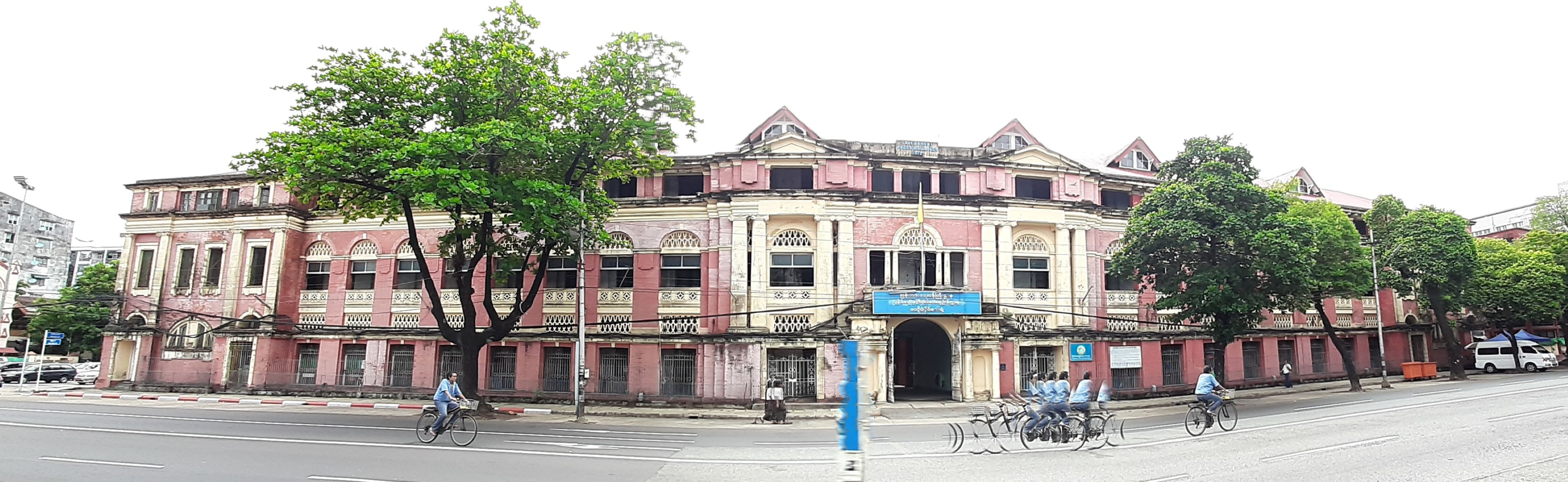
- Interactive map of the Government Press Buildings area

General information
- Location: Yangon, Myanmar
- Coordinates: 16.769805°N 96.160544°E
- Completed: 1912

Design and construction
- Architect: John Begg

The former Government Press Buildings (Burmese: ဗဟိုပုံနှိပ်စက်ရုံ) is a colonial-era landmark in Yangon, Myanmar (formerly Rangoon, Burma), designated in the Yangon City Heritage List. The building complex is located on the northwest corner of the Secretariat on Theinbyu Road.

The low-rise brick complex was designed by Scottish architect John Begg, and built between 1909 and 1912. The complex's main facade features an elegant entrance with Greek columns. During the colonial era, the building was the official distribution center and printing factory for official government publications, including gazettes, journals, news, and textbooks. In the post-colonial era, it became the publishing arm of the Ministry of Information's Government Printing and Stationery Department, employing over 1,300 staff. The broader Government Printing and Stationery Department complex housed the Printing & Publishing Enterprise (ပုံနှပ်ရေးနှင့်စာအုပ်ထုတ်ဝေရေးလုပ်ငန်း) until 2005, when the national government moved ministerial facilities to Naypyidaw. The building later served as the Office for the Minister of Information. This building is still owned by the Ministry which maintains some offices here.
