= Basic Education High School No. 2 Pabedan =

Secondary school in Yangon, Myanmar

Coordinates: 16°46′26.2″N 96°09′21.8″E

Pabedan 2 High School အ.ထ.က. (၂) ပန်းဘဲတန်း
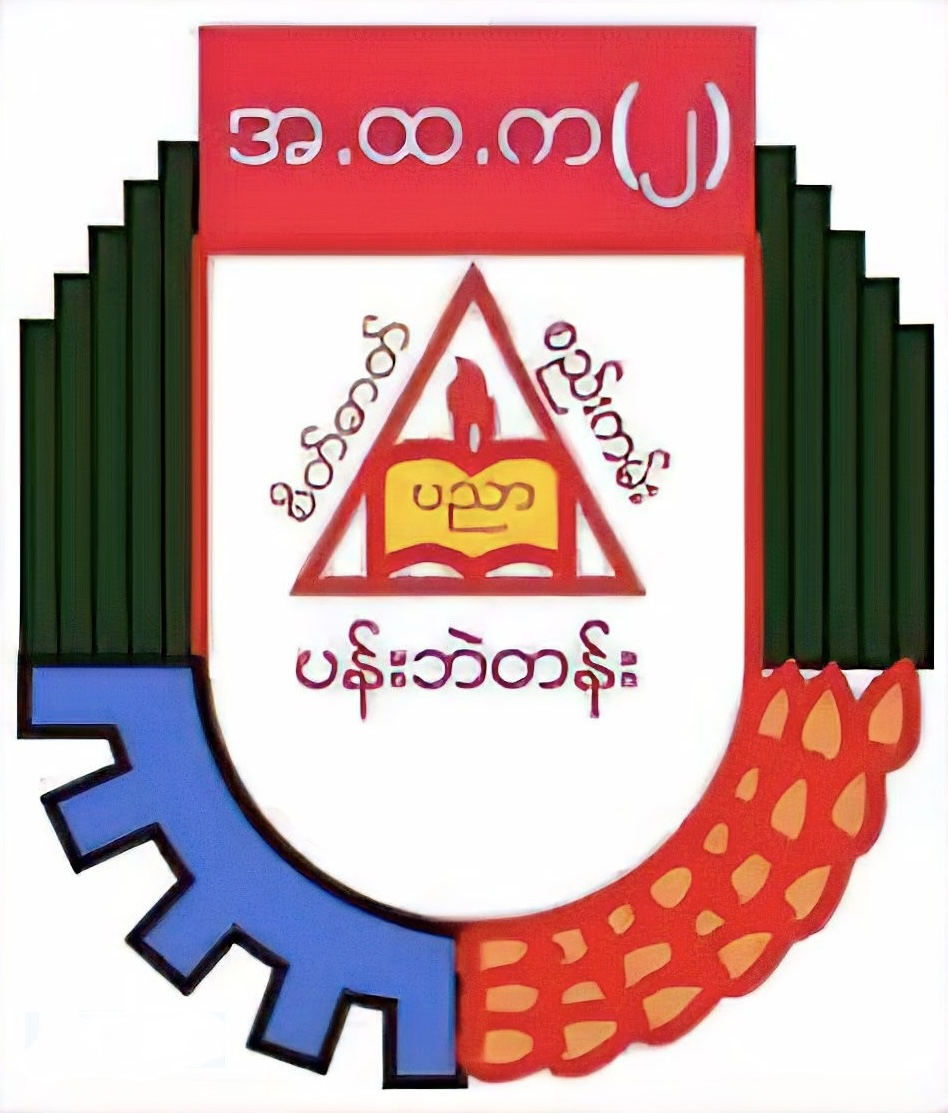

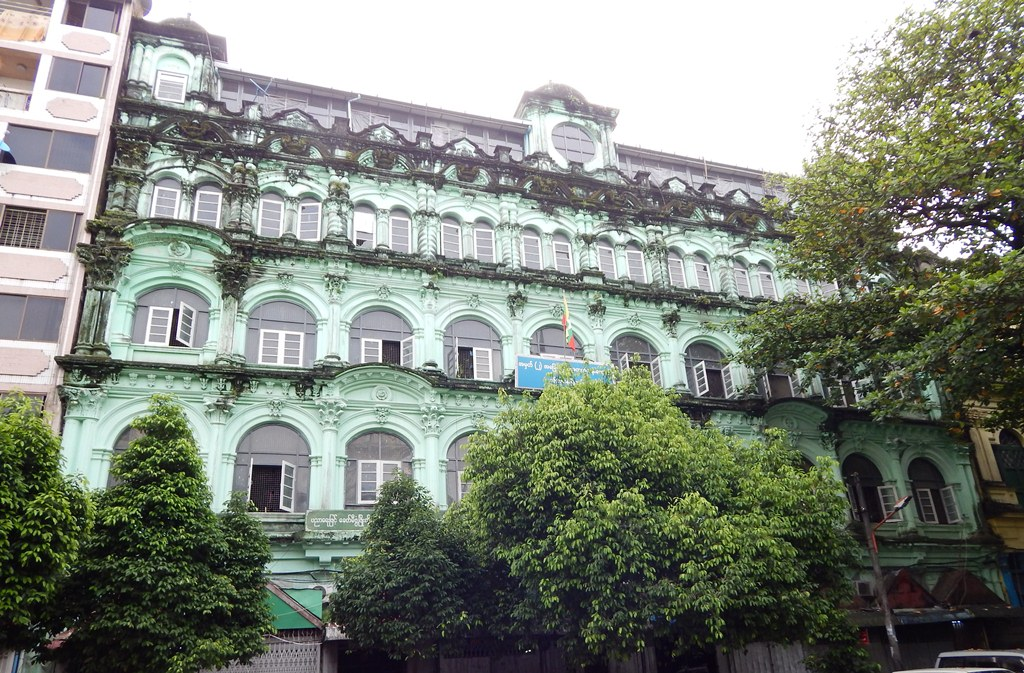
- BEHS - 2 Pabedan

Location
- No. (134,142) Shwe Bone Thar Street, Lower Block, Pabedan Township; Yangon, Yangon Region; Myanmar

Information
- Type: Public
- Established: 1867
- School number: 2
- Principal: Daw Ohn Than
- Grades: K–10
- Enrollment: ~1,000
- Nickname: Mogul Street School

Designations

Yangon City Landmark

Basic Education High School No.2 Pabedan (Burmese: အခြေခံ ပညာ အထက်တန်း ကျောင်း အမှတ် (၂) ပန်းဘဲတန်း; abbreviated to အ.ထ.က(၂)ပန်းဘဲတန်း; commonly known as Pabedan 2 High School or Mogul Street High School) is a public high school in Pabedan township, Yangon, Myanmar. The school's main building is a landmark protected by the city, and is listed on the Yangon City Heritage List.

== History ==
B.E.H.S - 2 Pabedan, located in Pabedan Township, Yangon, is a basic education high school established in 1867 as Madrasa Mohammadea(MM) Randeria High School.

Originally intended for the Rander community from Gujarat State, India, it is one of Myanmar's oldest schools, as indicated in a research paper published by Cambridge University Press. It was later renamed Basic Education High School No. 2 Pabedan, commonly referred to as Pabedan-2 . The school's main building, now a city-protected landmark, is featured on the Yangon City Heritage List.
