= Basic Education Primary School No. 6 Lanmadaw =

School in Yangon, Myanmar

Coordinates: 16°46′39.5″N 96°08′51.3″E

Lanmadaw 6 Primary School အ.မ.က. (၆) လမ်းမတော်
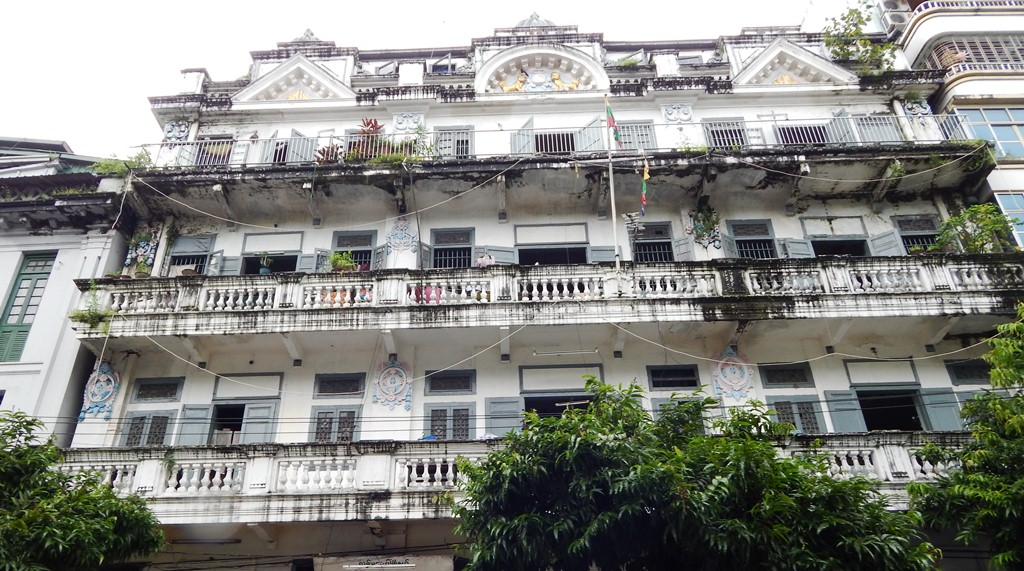

Location
- 183–185 Lanmadaw Road, Lanmadaw 11131; Yangon, Yangon Region; Myanmar

Information
- Type: Public
- School number: 6
- Grades: K-4

Designations

Yangon City Landmark

Basic Education Primary School No. 6 Lanmadaw (Burmese: အခြေခံ ပညာ မူလတန်း ကျောင်း အမှတ် (၆) လမ်းမတော်) is a public primary school in Yangon, Myanmar. The school's main colonial-era building is a landmark protected by the city, and is listed on the Yangon City Heritage List.
