= Strand Road, Yangon =

Major road in downtown Yangon, Myanmar

Coordinates: 16°46′09.5″N 96°09′39.5″E

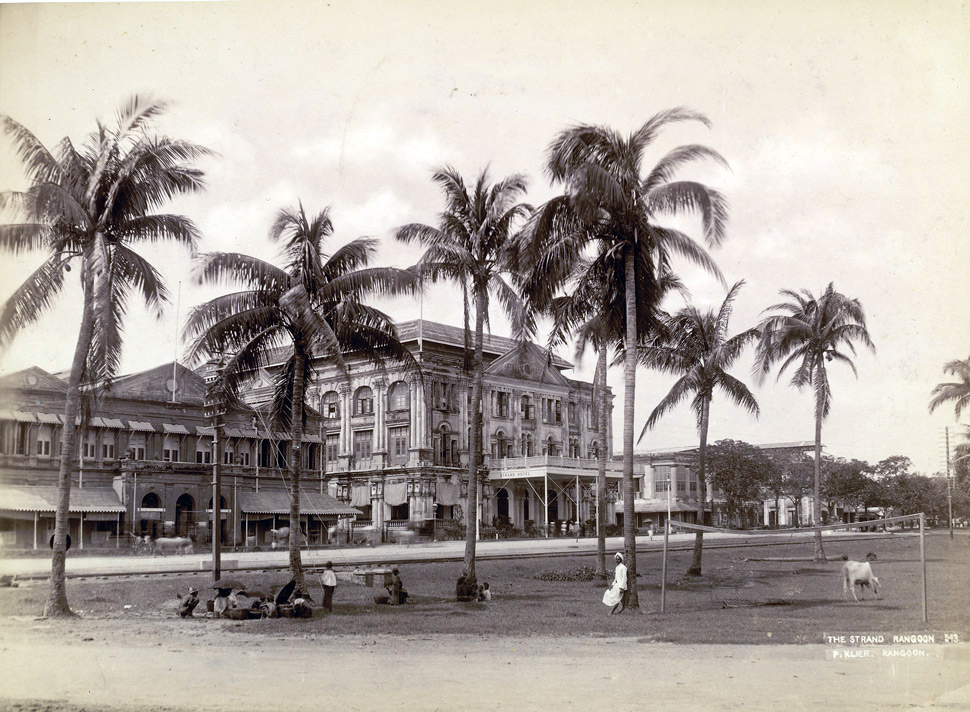

Strand Road (Burmese: ကမ်းနားလမ်း, pronounced [káɰ̃ná láɰ̃]) is a major road in downtown Yangon, Burma. It crosses the city in a west–east direction and runs parallel to the Yangon River. It contains many important government buildings, including the Ministry of Trade building, the New Law Courts, and the British embassy. It also contains the 5-star Strand Hotel, built in 1901.

== History ==
Howard Malcom, an American traveller to Burma in 1836 noted that there was a main street in Moulmein called Strand Road which extends along the Salween river about three miles. Its namesake was followed by streets in Rangoon and other Burmese cities in later years when the British occupied Burma after Second Anglo-Burmese War and Third Anglo-Burmese War. The Strand Road in Yangon was one of them.

In 2011, Asia World partnered with the Yangon City Development Committee to upgrade Strand Road. This redevelopment project to expand the number of lanes (as well as construct a dual-track railway line) on 9 kilometres (5.6 mi) of Strand Road, stretching from Botahtaung Township to Kyeemyindaing Township, will require the demolition of 182 buildings, including apartment buildings, government offices and warehouses.

== Gallery ==
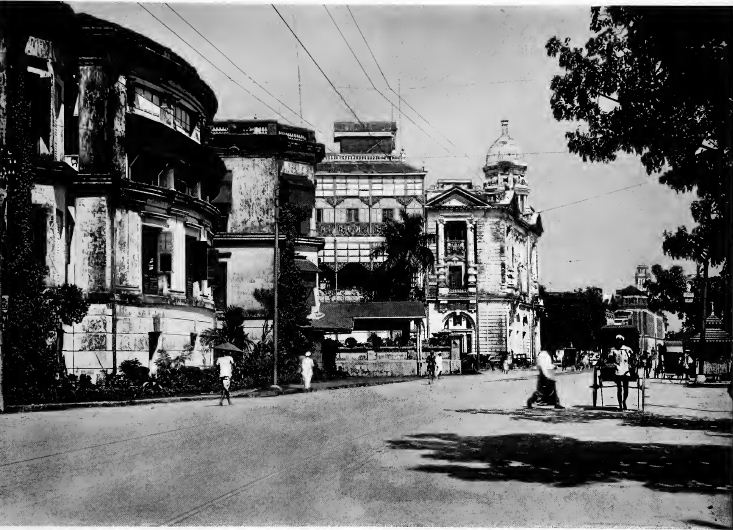
Strand Road in 1890s

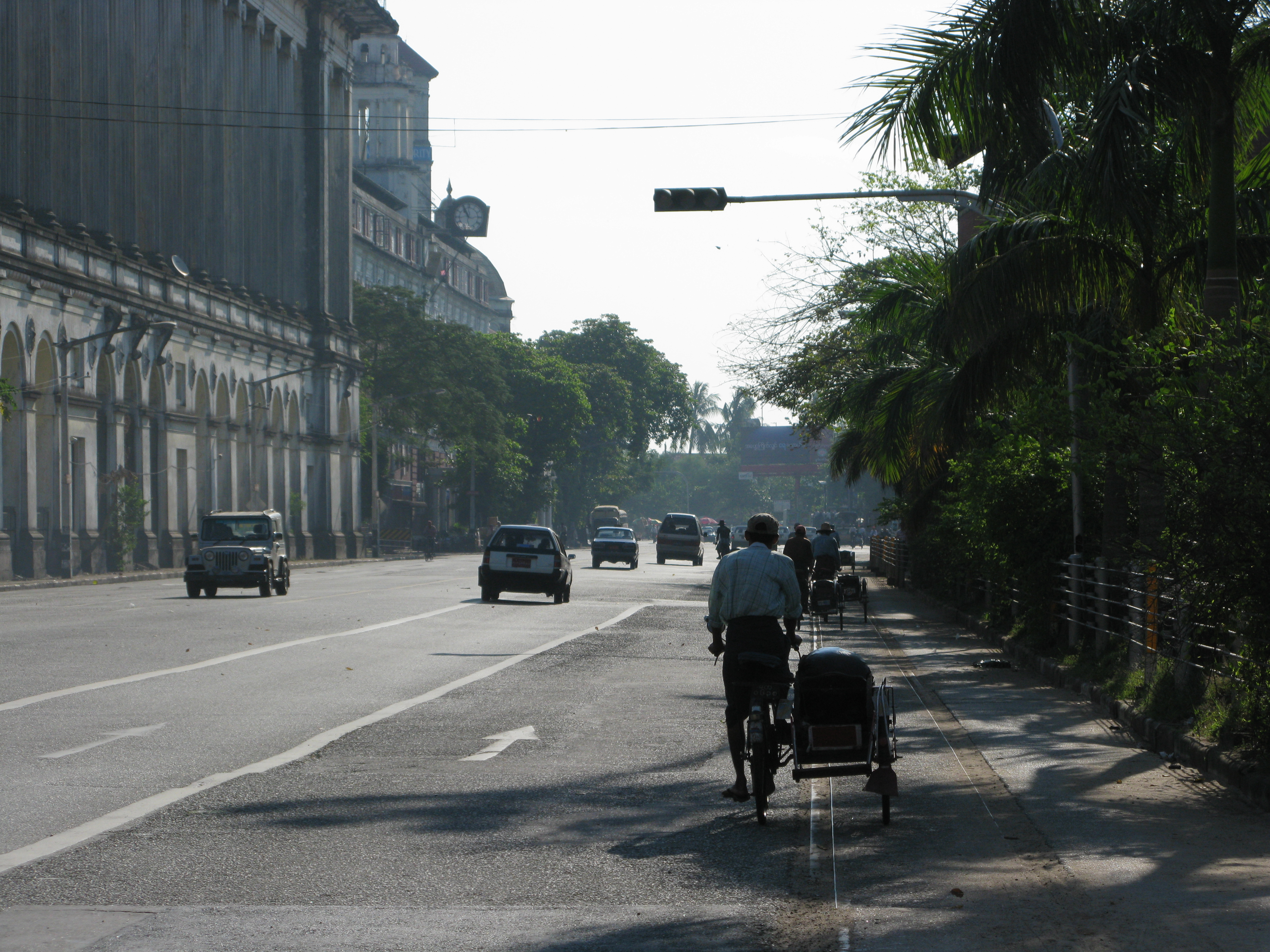
Strand Road in 2008

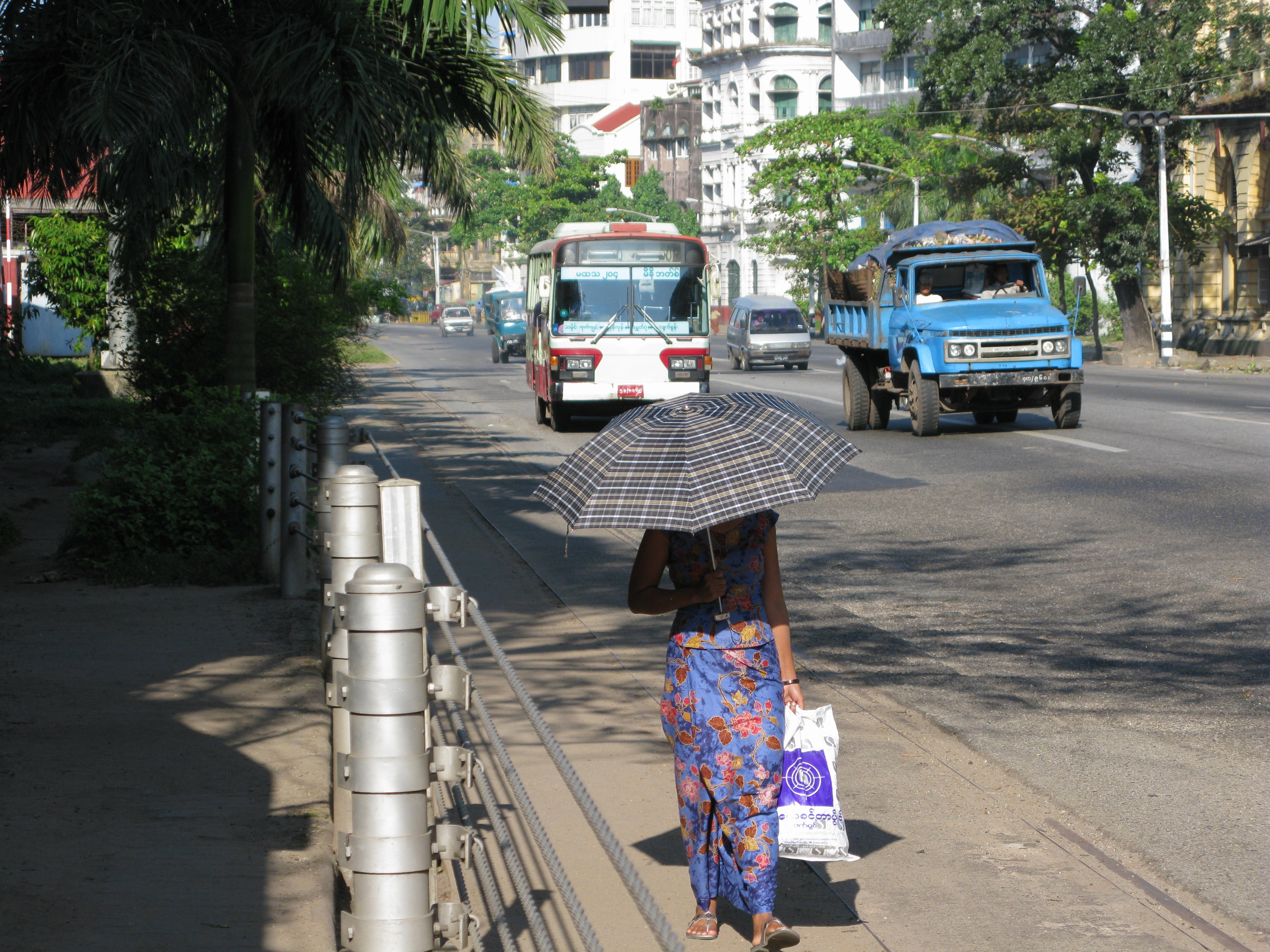
Strand Road in 2008

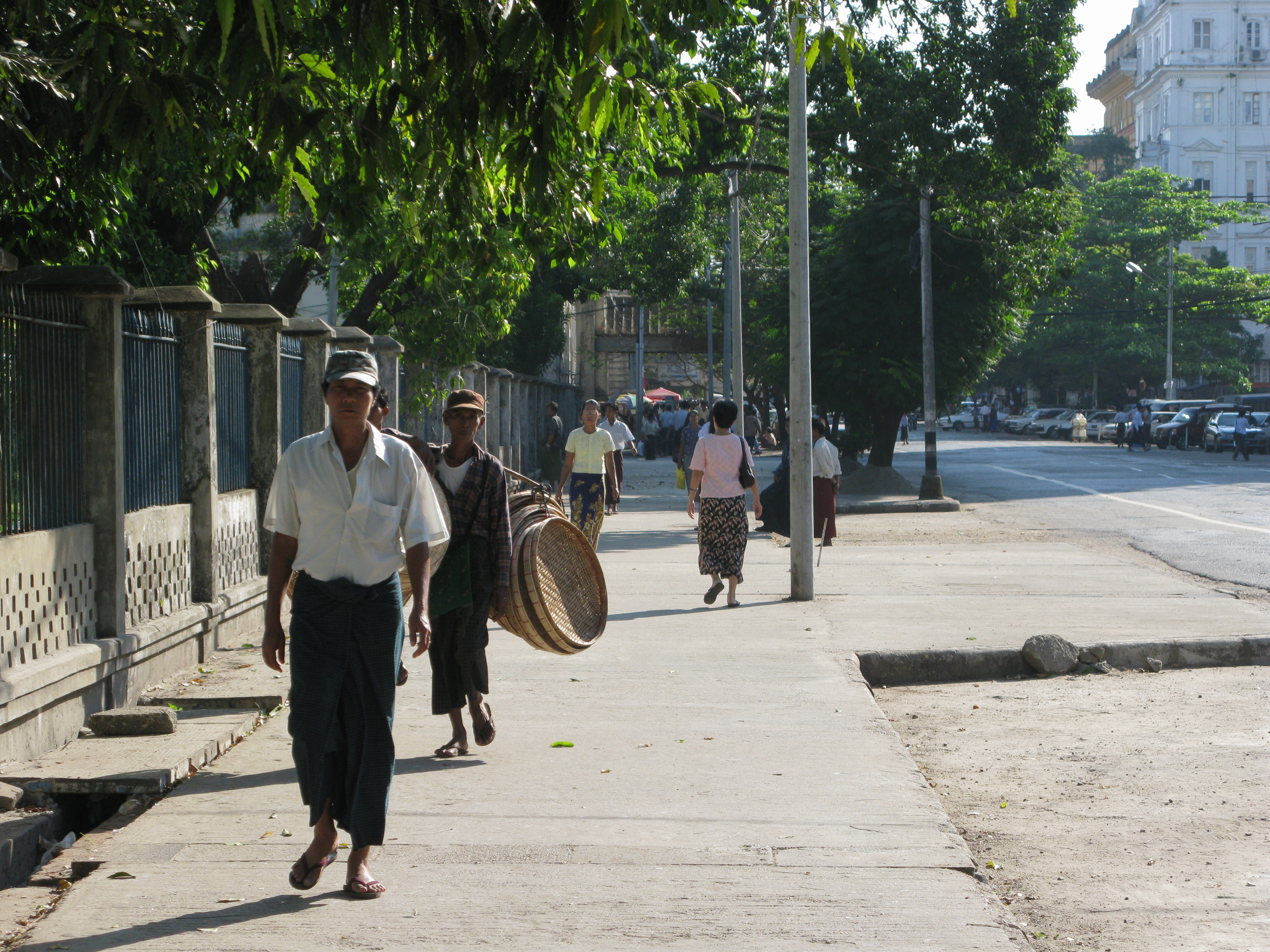
Strand Road in 2008

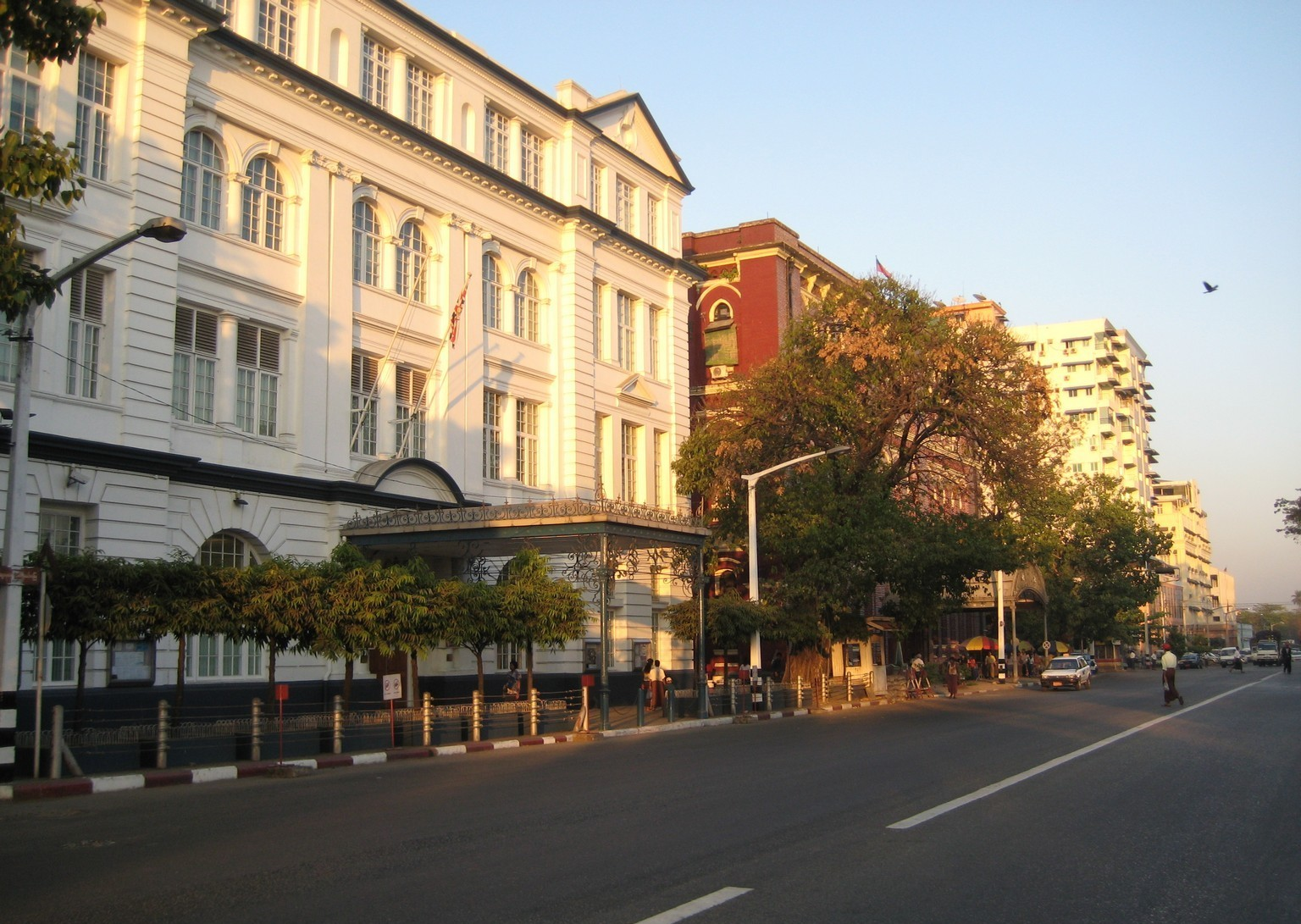
Strand Road in 2010

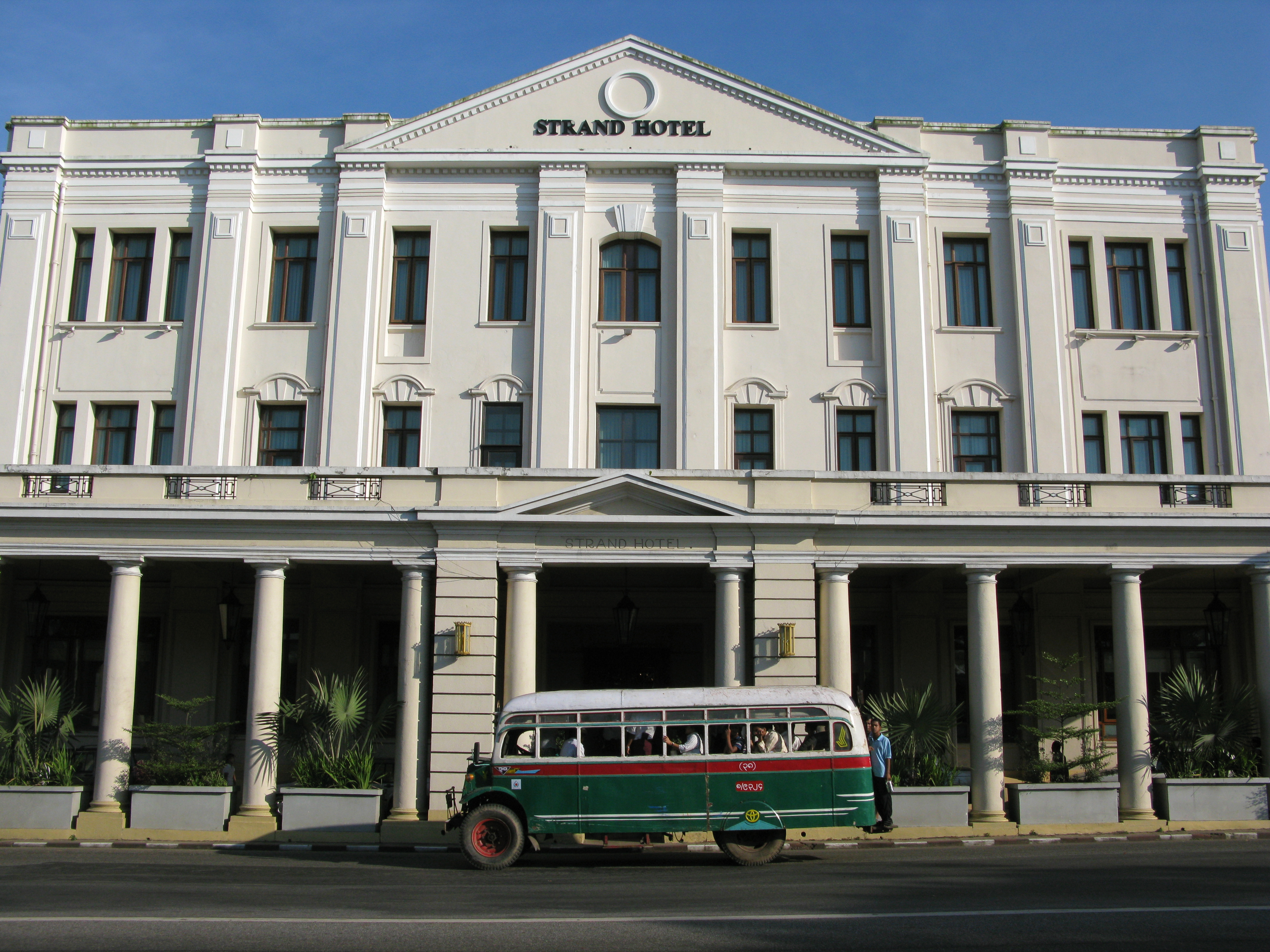
Strand Hotel on Strand Road
