= John Begg =

Scottish architect

John Begg (20 September 1866 – 23 February 1937), was a Scottish architect, who practised in London, South Africa and India, before returning to Scotland to teach at Edinburgh College of Art from 1922 to 1933.

== Life ==
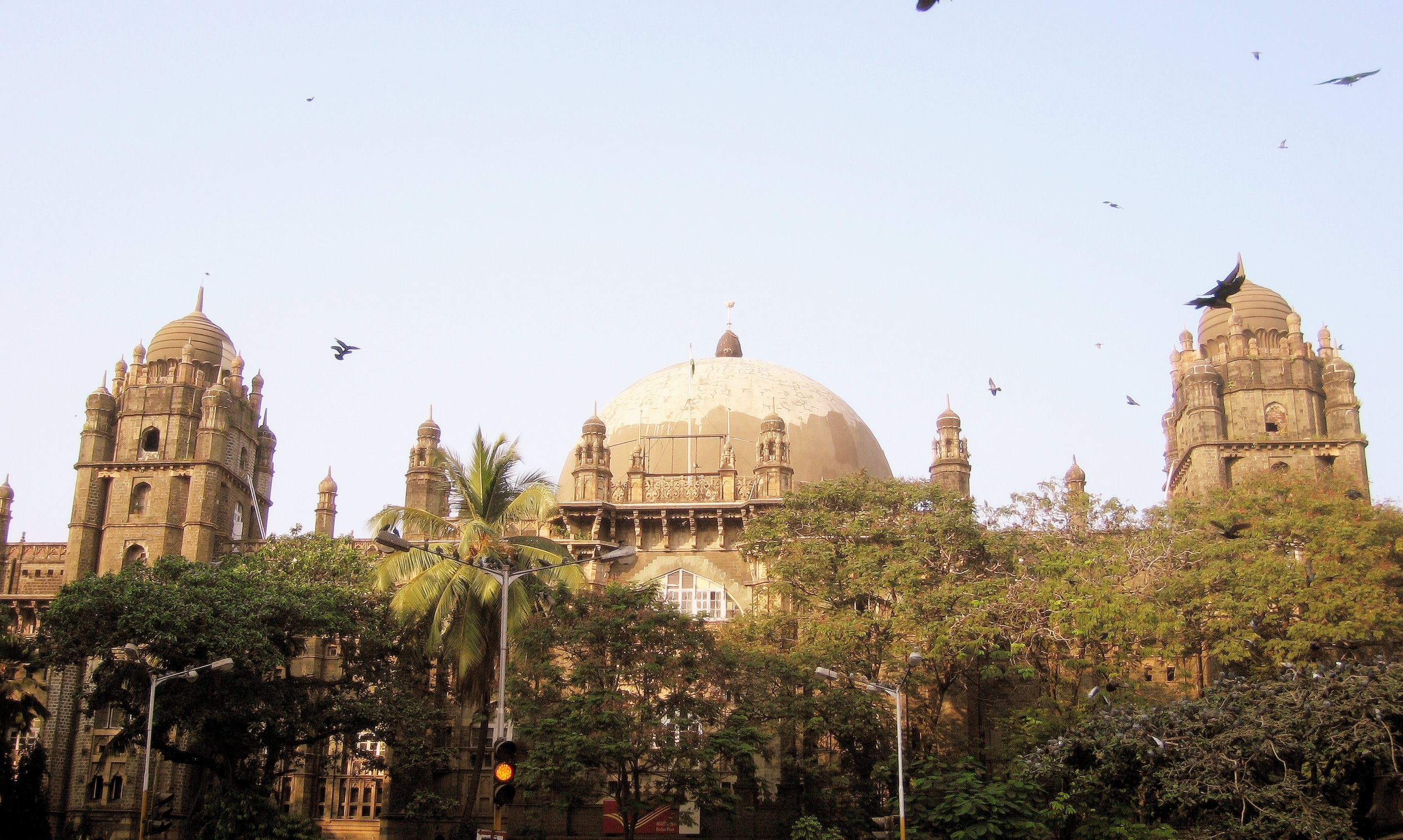
Bombay (now Mumbai) General Post Office

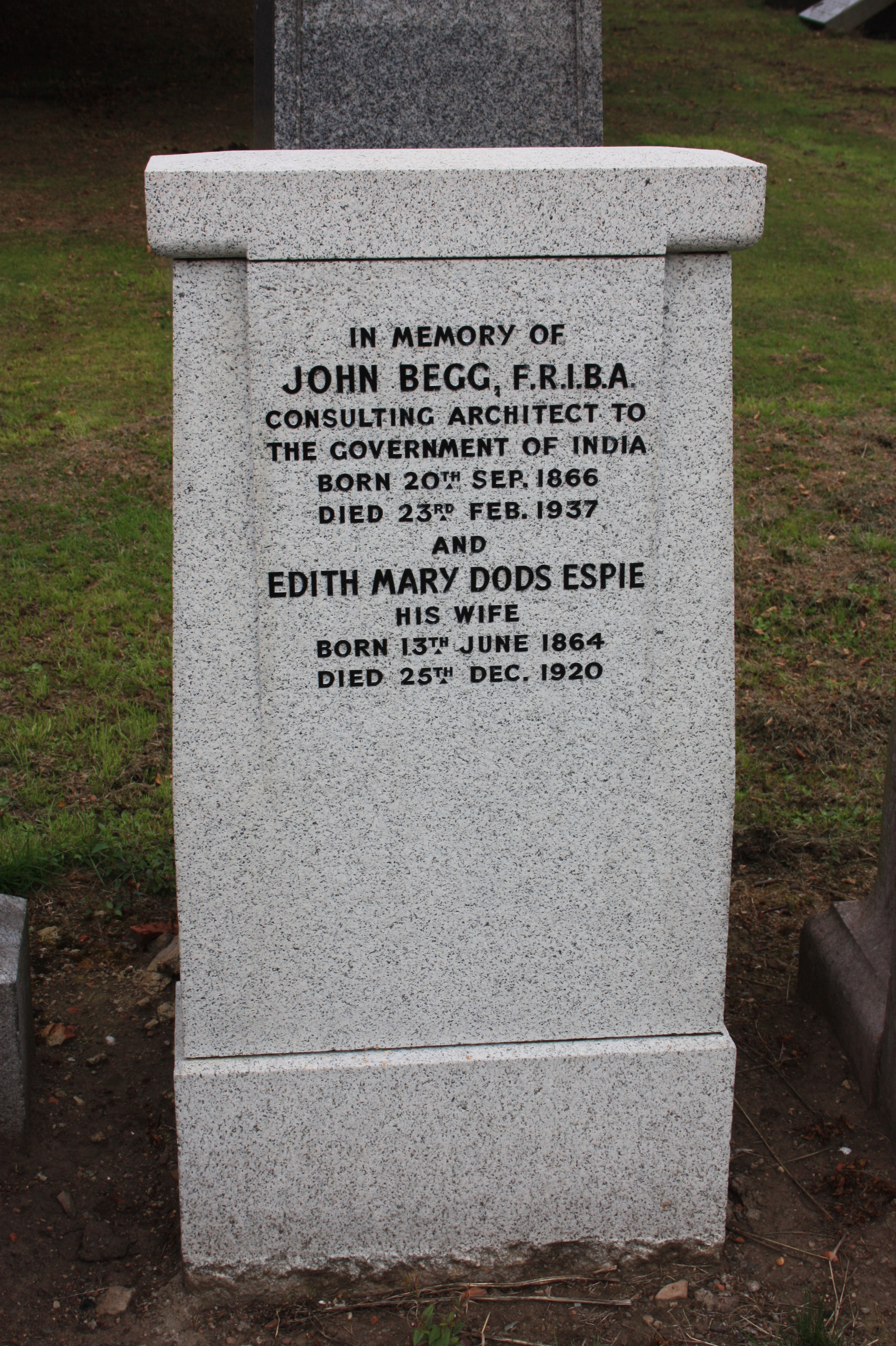
The grave of John Begg, Grange Cemetery

He was born in Bo'ness the third son of John Begg (1826–1878), an ironmonger and JP. He was educated at Edinburgh Academy, 1879–1883.

He trained under Hippolyte Blanc and was later employed first by Alfred Waterhouse and later by Sir Robert William Edis.

In 1896 he was appointed architect to the Real Estate Company of South Africa and moved to Johannesburg. He returned to Scotland due to the Boer War.

He arrived in India in 1901 as Consulting Architect to Bombay. In 1906 he became Consulting Architect to the Government of India. He, with George Wittet, was responsible for the evolution of the Indo-Saracenic style of architecture. Begg's best-known building is the General Post Office in Bombay.

He returned to Scotland in 1921 and went into partnership with Alexander Lorne Campbell, but never enjoyed the success or scale of projects which he had enjoyed in India.

In 1922 he adopted the role of Head of Architecture at the Edinburgh College of Art. During his period there he brought in Frank Mears to teach under him.

He served as President of the Royal Incorporation of Architects in Scotland in 1932.
