= List of name changes in Yangon =

This is a list of name changes of Yangon's major thoroughfares following Burma's independence in 1948.

== Roads ==
| Former name | New name |
|---|---|
| Arrow Lane | Naung-Yo Street (Mingala Taung Nyunt) |
| Barr Street | Maha Bandula Garden Street |
| Battery Road | Warazein Road (Botahtaung) |
| Bigandet Road | Eastern Part of Anawrahta Road |
| Binton Street | Thida Street (Ahlon) |
| Boundary Road | Dhammazedi Road |
| Campbell Road | Ngadatgyi Pagoda Road |
| Canal Road | Western Part of Anawrahta Road |
| Fraser Road | Middle Part of Anawrahta Road |
| Cheapes Road | Ma Naw Hari Road (Dagon) |
| Church Street | Eindawya Street (Dagon) |
| Churchill Road | Kabar Aye Pagoda Road |
| Creek Street | Bo Myat Tun Street |
| Crisp Street | Sinn O Dan Street |
| Commissioner's Road | Western Part of Bogyoke Aung San Road |
| Dalhousie Road | Maha Bandula Road |
| Dufferin Road | Sandaku Road |
| Dupali Street (Kyimyindine East) | Zay Street (Myaynigone) |
| Eden Road | Botataung Zay Road |
| Edward Street | Konzedan Street |
| Evanson Road | Mya Yar Kone Road |
| Forsyth Street | Kinwun Mingyi Street (Dagon) |
| Fraser Road | Anawratha Road |
| Franklin Street | Thazin Street (Ahlon) |
| Fytch Road | Baho Road |
| Godwin Road | Lanmadaw Road and Myoma Kyaung Road |
| Goodaifee Road | Sayar San Road |
| Halpin Road | Pyidaungzu Yeiktha Road |
| Keighley Street | Wadan Road |
| King Edward Avenue | Daw Thein Tin Road and Bo Min Kaung Road |
| Kokine Road | Kaba Aye Pagoda Road |
| Lake Road | Kan Yeik Thar Road and U Htaung Bo Road |
| Lancaster Road | Nawaday Road |
| Leeds Road | Kha Yay Pin Road (Dagon) |
| Lewis Street | Seikkantha Street |
| Lansdowne Road | Yazadirit Road |
| Lower Kemmendine Road | Lower Kyimyindaing Road |
| Masjid Road | Thamein Bayan Road |
| Maung Htaw Lay Street | Bo Sun Pet Street |
| Merchant Road | Konthe Road |
| Mission Road and St. John Road | Min Ye Kyaw Swar Road |
| Moghul Road | Shwe Bontha Road |
| Monkey Point Road | Than Lyet Soon Road |
| Montgomery Road | Eastern Part of Bogyoke Aung San Road |
| Morton Street | Lan Thit Road |
| Municipal Bazaar Road | Pann Pin Kyi Street |
| Newlyns Street | Sagawa Street (Dagon) |
| Norman School Street | Nanttha Street (Ahlon) |
| Pagoda Road | Shwedagon Pagoda Road |
| Phayre Street | Pansodan Street |
| Prome Road | Pyay Road |
| Sandwith Road | Bo Yar Nyunt Street |
| Simpson Street | Pan Tra Street |
| St. Anthony Street | U Po Kya Street (Mingala Taung Nyunt) |
| Saya Mark Gyi Street | Waibagi Street (Ahlon) |
| Sparks Road | Bo Aung Kyaw Road |
| Stevenson Road | Hledan Road |
| Stockade Road and Judah Ezekiel Road | Theinbyu Road |
| Thamaing Link Road | Kyaik Wine Pagoda Road |
| Thompson Road | Botataung Pagoda Road |
| Tsitke Mg Khaing Street | Bo Ywe Street |
| U On Gaing Road | Bo Min Yaung Road |
| Upper Phayre Road | Upper Pansodan Road |
| Voyle Road | U Wisara Road |
| Windermere Road | Thanlwin Road |
| Windsor Road | Shin Saw Pu Road |
| York Street | Yaw Mingyi Street |
| Brookings Street | Bogalay Zay Street |

== Places ==
| Former name | New name |
|---|---|
| Burma Translation Society Building | Sarpay Beikman |
| Brooking Street Wharf | Pansodan Ferry Terminal |
| Cantonment | Downtown |
| Cantonment Gardens | U Ottama Garden (Kan Taw Mingalar Garden) |
| Dalhousie Park | Bogyoke Aung San Park |
| Eden Street Jetties | Botahtaung Harbour |
| Fytche Square | Maha Bandula Park |
| Kyimyindine (East) | Myaynigone (in Sanchaung Township) |
| Lake Victoria | Inya Lake |
| Royal Lake | Kandawgyi Lake |
| Signal Pagoda | Alanpya Pagoda |
| Scott's Market | Bogyoke Aung San Market |
| St. John's College | B.E.H.S (1) Lammadaw |
| St. Paul's Institute | B.E.H.S (6) Botahtaung |
| Union Bank of Burma | Yangon Stock Exchange |
| Victoria Park | Yangon Zoological Gardens |
| West Rangoon Park | Thakhin Mya Park |

== See also ==
- List of renamed places in Myanmar
