= Maha Bandula (disambiguation) =

Maha Bandula (also spelled Mahabandoola) is a 19th-century Burmese general who fought against the British in the First Anglo-Burmese War of 1824–1826.

Many places and structures are named in his honor:

- Maha Bandula Bridge: A major bridge in eastern Yangon linking Pazundaung Township and Dawbon Township
- Maha Bandula Park: A famous park in downtown Yangon; Independence Monument is located here
- Maha Bandula Road: One of four main east–west thoroughfares in downtown Yangon
