= Pazundaung =

Pazundaung (Burmese: ပုဇွန်တောင်, lit. 'prawn hill') is a Burmese name that may refer to:

- Pazundaung Creek: A creek in eastern Yangon, Myanmar
- Pazundaung Market: A market in southeastern part of Yangon
- Pazundaung Township: A township in southeastern Yangon
