= High Court Building (Yangon) =

- တရားရုံးချုပ်ဟောင်း
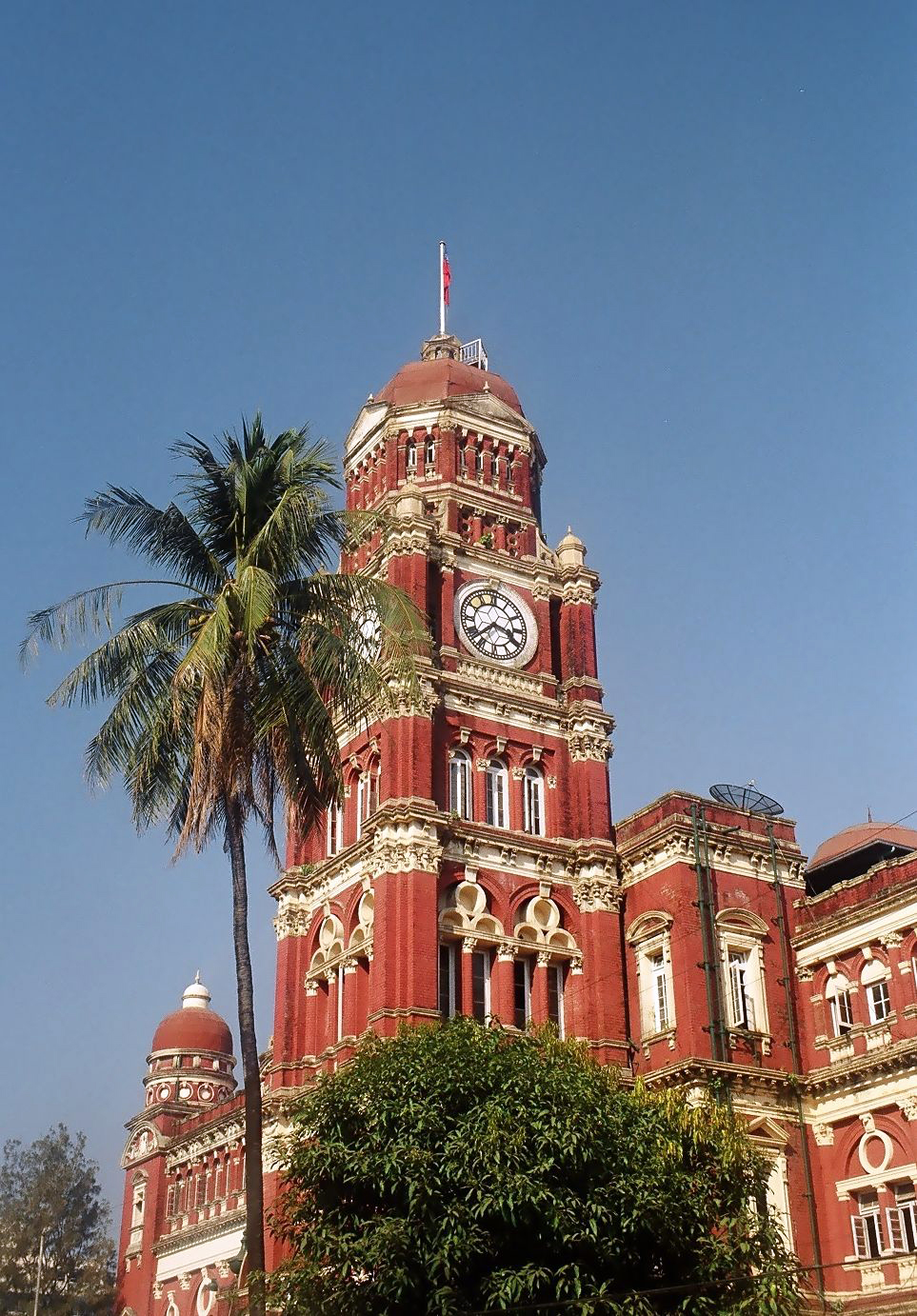
- Interactive map of the High Court Building area

General information
- Architectural style: Indo-Saracenic Architecture
- Location: Yangon, Myanmar, Burma
- Coordinates: 16°46′23″N 96°9′39″E
- Current tenants: High Court of Yangon Region
- Construction started: 1905
- Completed: 1911
- Client: Government of British Burma
- Owner: Government of Myanmar

Design and construction
- Architect: James Ransome

Designations

Yangon City Landmark

The former High Court Building (Burmese: တရားရုံးချုပ်ဟောင်း) is a colonial-era building in Myanmar, located at No. 89/133 Pansodan Street, between Maha Bandula Garden Street and Pansodan Street in Kyauktada Township, downtown Yangon.

Until 2006, the Supreme Court of Myanmar was located at this complex.

The High Court Building was designed by architect James Ransome, construction of the High Court began in 1905 and was completed in 1911, and is noted for its colonial-era Indo-Saracenic Architecture, including its clock tower and its red-bricked exterior.

The building is listed on the Yangon City Heritage List. Located near Yangon City Hall, the building faces the Independence Monument and the Maha Bandula Park.

== Gallery ==
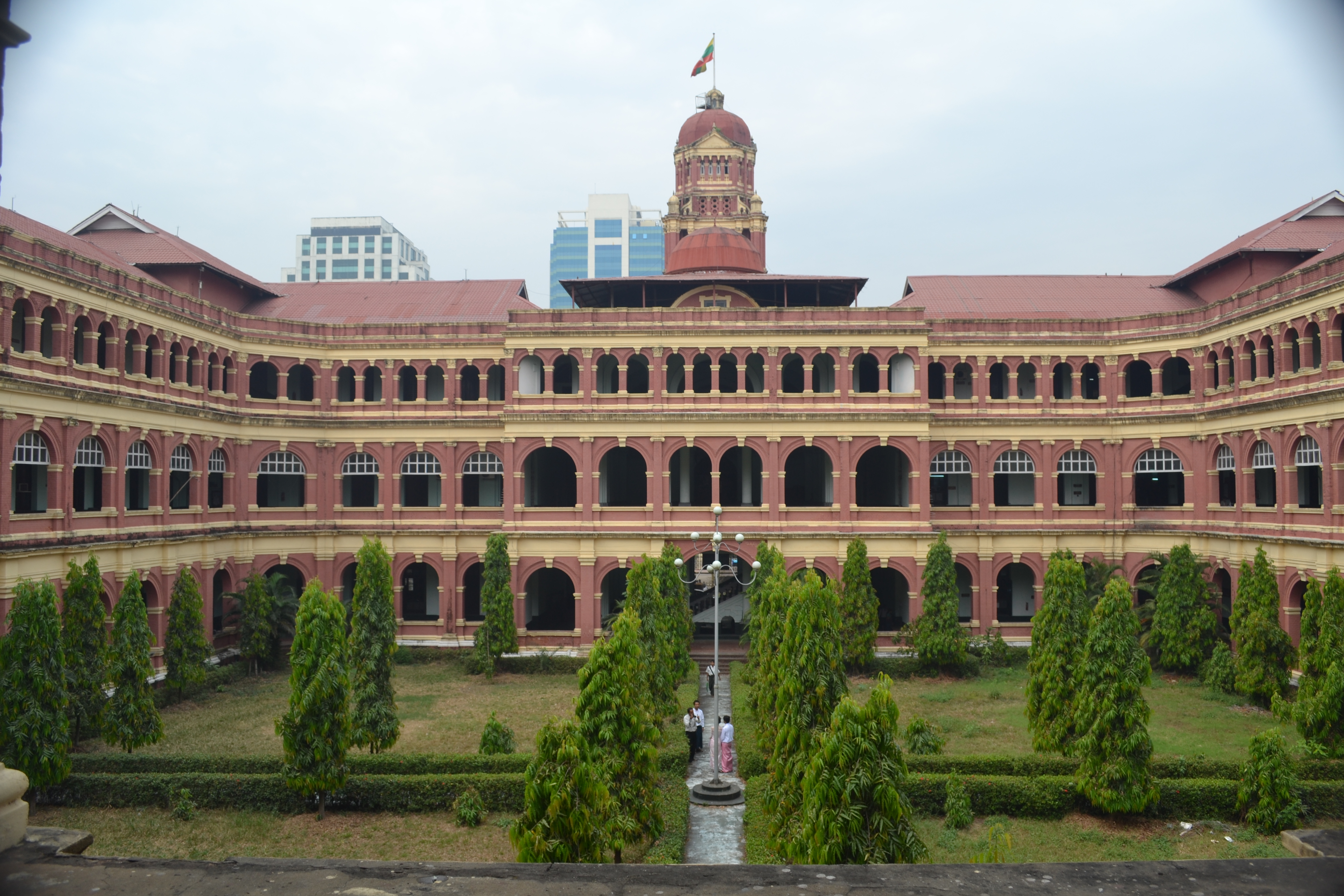
Panoramic view over the western side of Square ward building

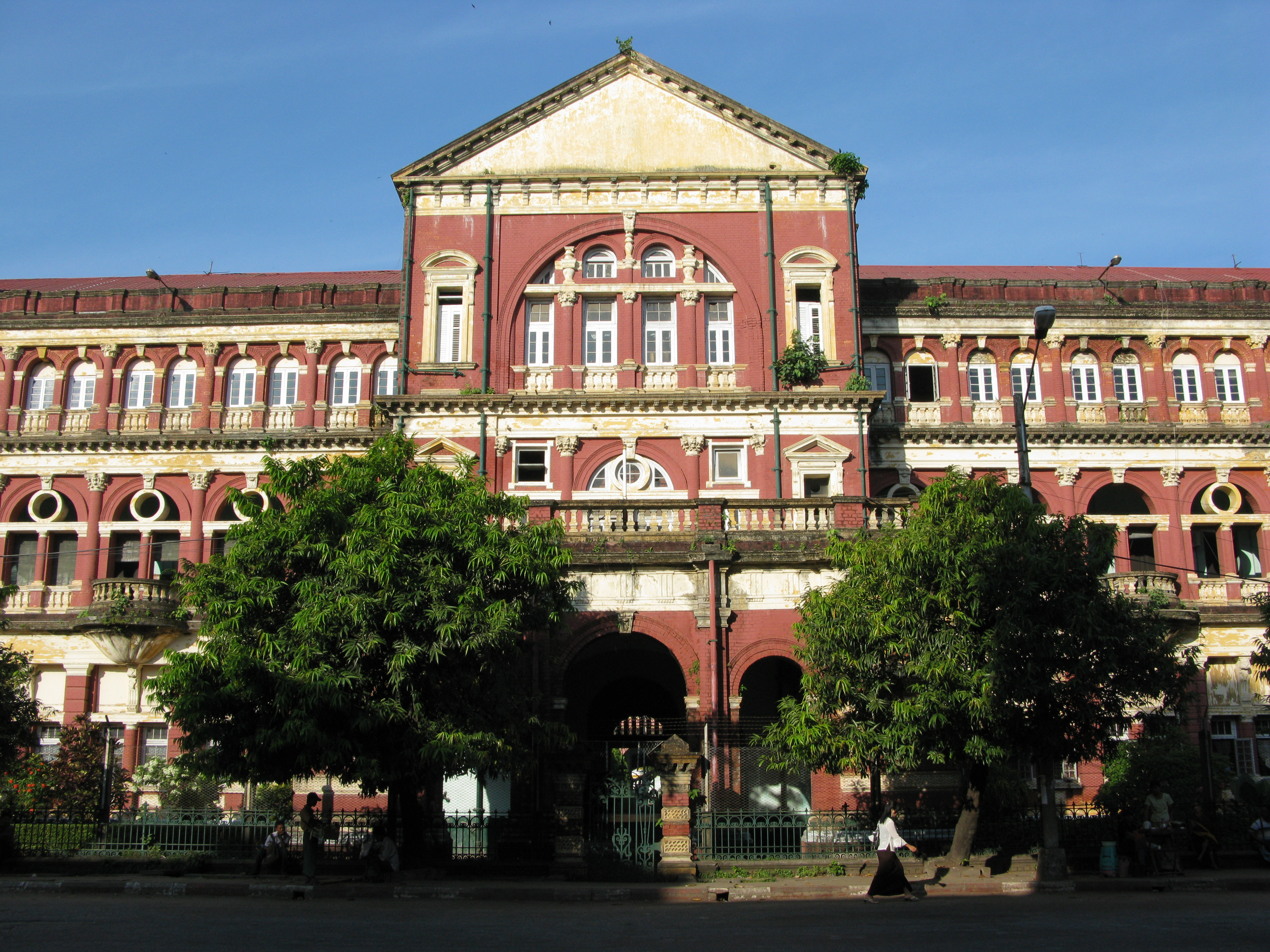
Yangon High Court

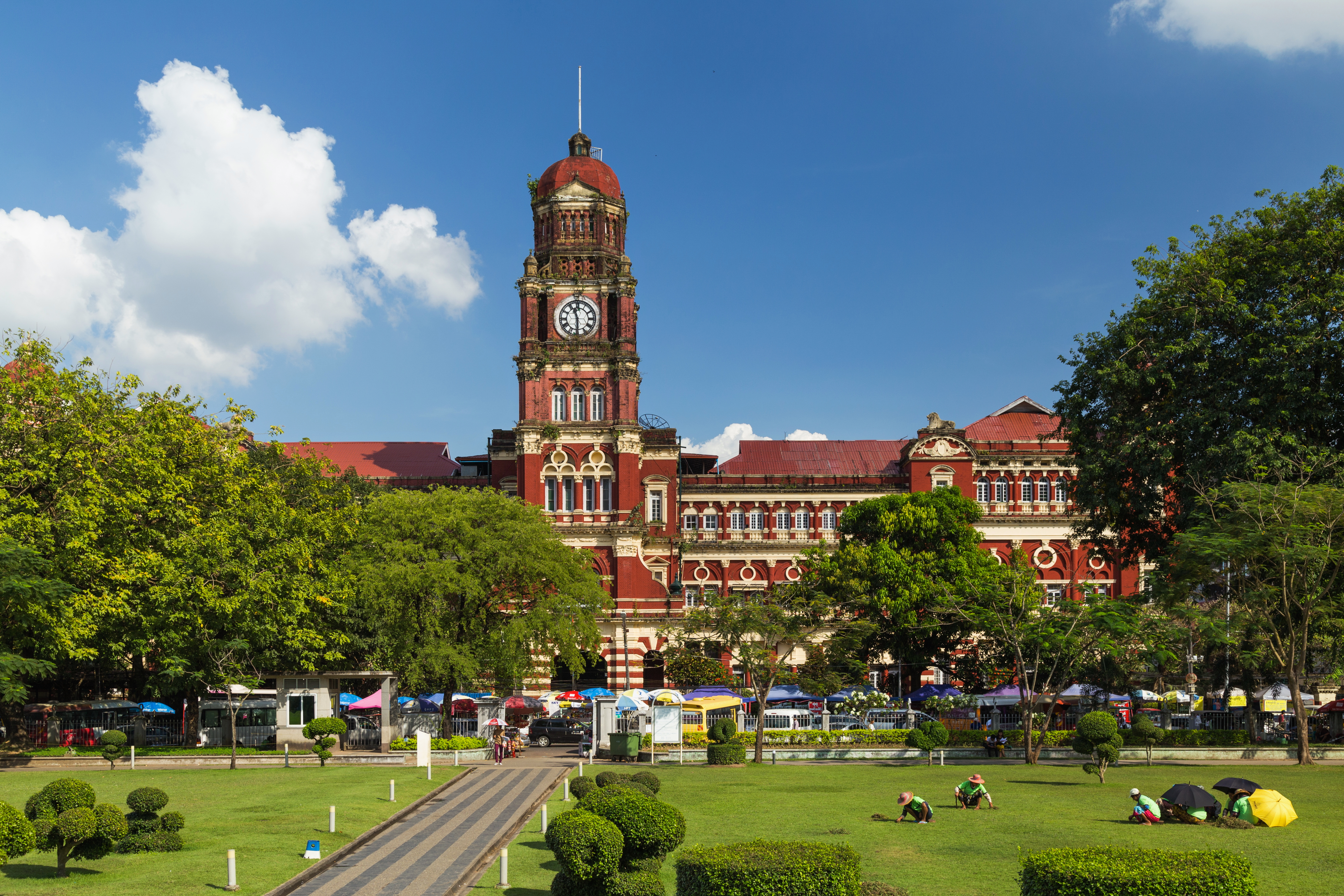
Seen across from the Maha Bandula Park

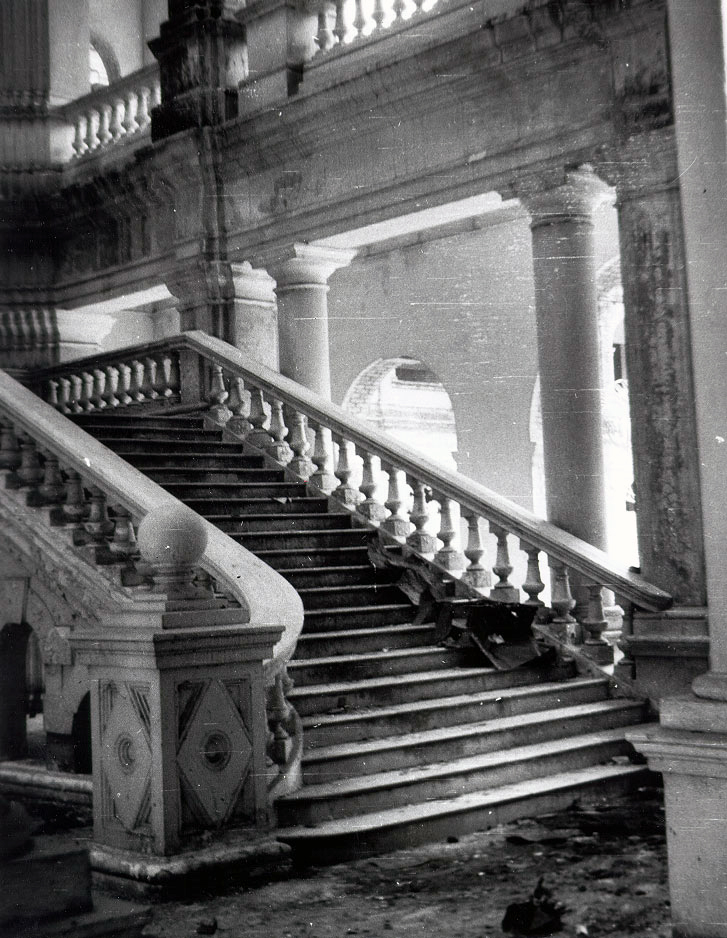
Front lobby of the High Court shortly after World War II

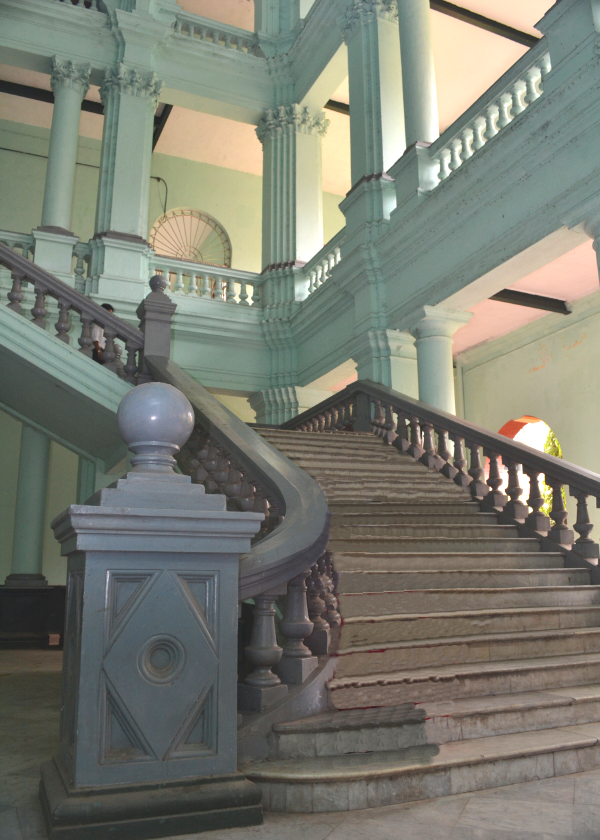
Lobby staircase in 2012
