= Embassy of the United States, Yangon =

Embassy of the United States of America in Burma
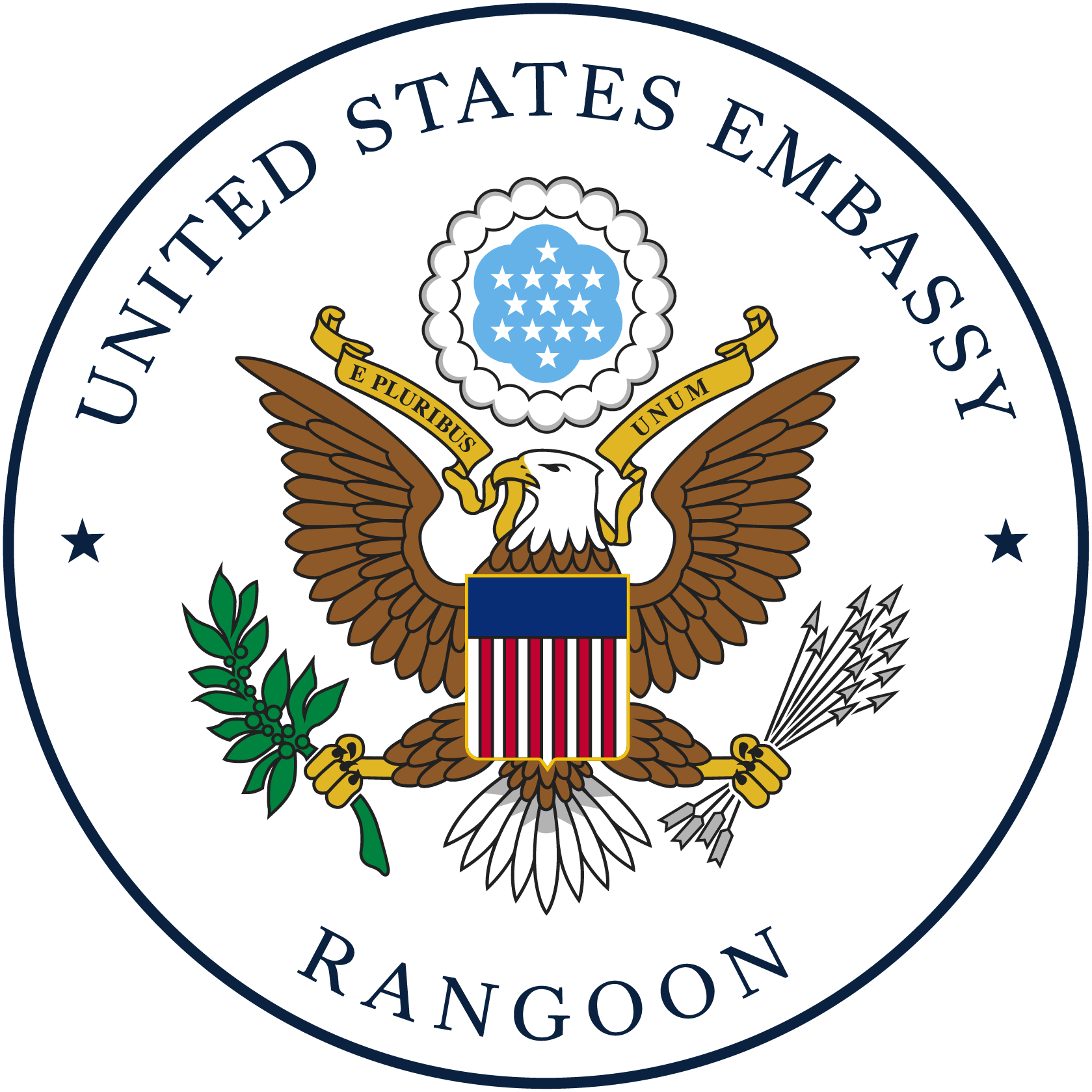
- Location: Rangoon, Burma
- Address: 110 University Avenue Road, Kamayut Township
- Coordinates: 16.82543°N 96.14473°E
- Relocated: August 2007
- Ambassador: Douglas Sonnek (Chargé d'Affairs ad interim)
- Website: mm.usembassy.gov

The Embassy of the United States of America in Rangoon represents the official diplomatic mission of the American government in Burma (Myanmar), provides assistance to American citizens and issues visas to foreign nationals, for the purposes of visiting and immigration.

== Location ==
The American Embassy was formerly located in Downtown Rangoon, on Merchant Street between 33rd Street and 34th Street, facing the Independence Monument park and Rangoon City Hall on the other side of the park. Sule Pagoda was one block north on the west side of the park. The building was formerly a Bank in a 45,437 square feet (4,221.2 m^{2}) colonial-era structure. In August 2007, the embassy moved to new premises further from Downtown, because of security concerns at the old site. From 2001 to 2005, as a consequence of the September 11 attacks, roadblocks and security barriers were placed in front the building, to seal off traffic.

The new embassy site, located on the University Avenue Road in Rangoon's Kamayut Township, facing Inya Lake, was reportedly constructed at the cost of $60 million USD.

== Controversy ==
According to WikiLeaks cables, the embassy funded some of the civil society groups in Burma that forced the government to suspend a controversial Chinese Myitsone Dam on the Irrawaddy River. According to media reports citing documents published by Germany's Der Spiegel in 2010, the embassy is the site of an electronic surveillance facility used to monitor telephones and communications networks, run jointly by the Central Intelligence Agency and National Security Agency group known as Special Collection Service.
