= Sein Gay Har =

- Native name: စိန်ဂေဟာ
- Company type: Private
- Industry: Retail
- Founded: 1985; 41 years ago in Rangoon, Burma
- Headquarters: Yangon, Myanmar
- Website: seingayhar.com

Sein Gay Har (Burmese: စိန်ဂေဟာ; SGH) is a major Burmese retailer. Sein Gay Har began as a market in Rangoon's Chinatown in 1985. The company runs major shopping centers in Yangon.

== See also ==
- City Mart Holdings
- Gamone Pwint
