= May 2005 Yangon bombings =

2005 Terrorist attack in Myanmar

- Part of Myanmar conflict
- May 2005 Yangon bombings (Myanmar)
- Location: Yangon, Myanmar (Burma)
- Date: 7 May 2005; 3:10 pm (MMT)
- Target: Civilians
- Attack type: Bombing
- Deaths: 11
- Injuries: 162

The May 2005 Yangon bombings were nearly simultaneous bomb blasts that killed 11 people and injured 162 on 7 May 2005 in Yangon, Myanmar (Burma).

== Bombings ==
On 7 May 2005, nearly simultaneous bomb blasts occurred at two supermarkets and a convention centre in Yangon. The first bomb blew up at an exhibition hall at Mingala Taungnyunt Township where a Thai trade fair was under way, killing three people including a Buddhist monk, and wounding many others. The second explosion tore through a City Mart supermarket in Mayangon Township and the final explosion struck in the Dagon Shopping Center near the Myaynigone Intersection.

== Investigations ==
The authorities blamed the Karen National Union, the Shan State Army-South, the Karenni National Progressive Party and the National Coalition Government of the Union of Burma. The Karen National Union and the Shan State Army-South quickly denied responsibility.
