= Yoon Myat Thu =

Burmese singer

Yoon Myat Thu ယွန်းမြတ်သူ
- Also known as: Mi Yoon
- Born: October 15, 1998 (age 26); Pazundaung Township, Yangon
- Genres: Pop
- Occupation: Singer
- Years active: 2020-present

Yoon Myat Thu (Burmese: ယွန်းမြတ်သူ; born; 15 October 1998) is a Burmese singer. She garnered popularity with the song "Nin Lan Tawe Khae Yin". She was born on 15 October 1998 in Yangon, Myanmar to Myo Htun and Aye Aye.

== Discography ==
Single

- A Chit Huu Di (2020)
- Brain Less (2021)
- Ngar Chit Tar Min (2021)
- Nin Lan Tawe Khae Yin (2021)
- A Kyain Kyain (2022)
- Oxygen (2022)
- Min Mha Min (2022)
- Kwat Kyarr Moe (2022)
- A Phyae Khan (2022)
- Thate Khar Nae Yate Khar (2022)
- Ngar Atwat Ngar Shi Tal (2022)
- Chit Yin Sate Ma Kout Khay (2022)
- SEAT (2022)
- Toe Yay Chone Htar Taw (2022)
- Reflection (2022)
- Mate Swe (2022)
- cafe (2023)
- Ma Chit Thint Tae Luu (2023)
- December Love (2023)
- Nway Oo Kabyar (2023)
- Lwan/Ban (2023)
- THE END (2023)
- ဘ၀ခါးခါး (2023)
- Muu…..Yuuu (2023)
- Nyo Nyin Buu Loh Ler (2024)
- Everything (2024)
- မလွမ်းသင့်တော့ဘူး (2024)
- Pyor (2024)
- Thingyan Moe (2024)
