= Lanmadaw Phoe Toke =

Burmese gangster and nationalist (1898–1944)

- လမ်းမတော်ဖိုးတုတ်
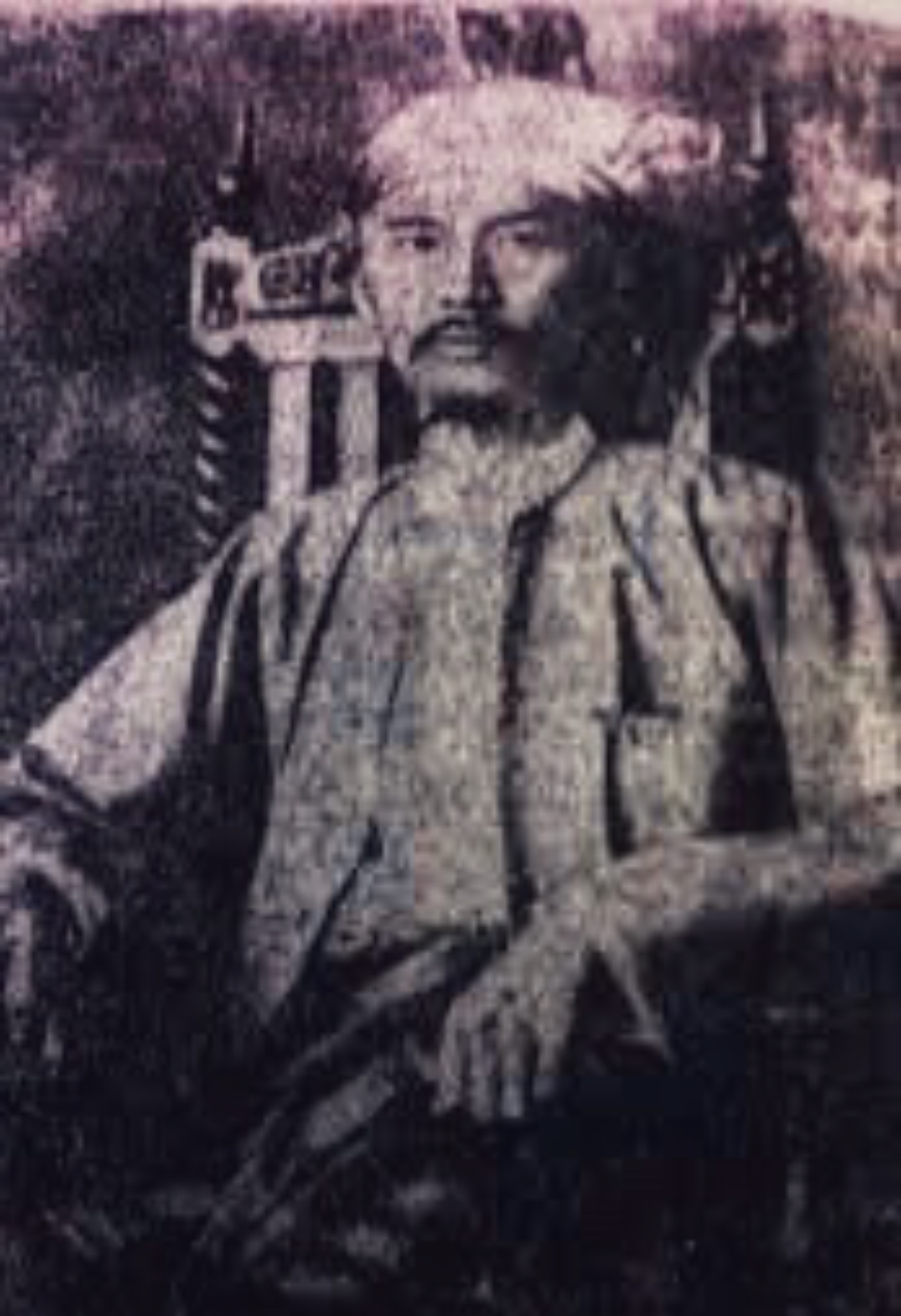
- Lanmadaw Phoe Toke
- Born: Phoe Toke; 1898; Kamarse village, Bago District, British Burma
- Died: 26 December 1944 (aged 45–46); Myaungmya Prison Hospital, Myaungmya
- Parent(s): San Nyein (father); Chit Pu (mother)

Lanmadaw Phoe Toke (Burmese: လမ်းမတော်ဖိုးတုတ်; 1898 – 26 December 1944) was a noted Burmese gangster who had influence over residents in Yangon's Chinatown district during the colonial era. He was a nationalist figure in Myanmar and also known for his involvement in the Indian-Burmese riots during the early 20th century.

In those days most of Myanmar children even knew about him and held Phoe Toke in respect since they were young.

== Biography ==
Phoe Toke was born in 1898 in Kamarse village, Bago District, British Burma to parents San Nyein and Chit Pu. He was named after the Lanmadaw Township where he lived, committed thuggery and collected so-called "taxes" from local people and businesses. He was the most generous donor to the Thirty Comrades who went to military training in Hainan.

One day, Ba Maw's government arrested Phoe Toke for security reasons and sent him to Myaungmya Prison without trial. Phoe Toke died on 26 December 1944 at Myaungmya Prison Hospital.

== In popular culture ==
- Min Ponnya's book Lanmadaw Phoe Toke and Botataung Nga Moe, published in 2013, is the subject of Lanmadaw Phoe Toke.
- Lanmadaw Phoe Toke is the subject of Khet Zaw's best seller popular eponymous novel The Guys of Rangoon, 1930, published in 2020.

== Sources ==
- Lvaṅʻ, Kyoʻ Mraṅʻ (1975). Mranʻ māʹ bala kha rīʺ nhaṅʻʹ kāya bala pha khaṅʻ (in Burmese). Cā pe Bimānʻ.
- Ūʺ (Nāga), Taṅʻ (2002). Cane sā ̋ e* bhava tuikʻ pvai myā ̋ (in Burmese). Khyacʻ ca rā Cā pe.
