= Basic Education High School No. 3 Dagon =

Coordinates: 16.8760°N 96.1890°E

Dagon 3 High School အ.ထ.က. (၃) ဒဂုံ
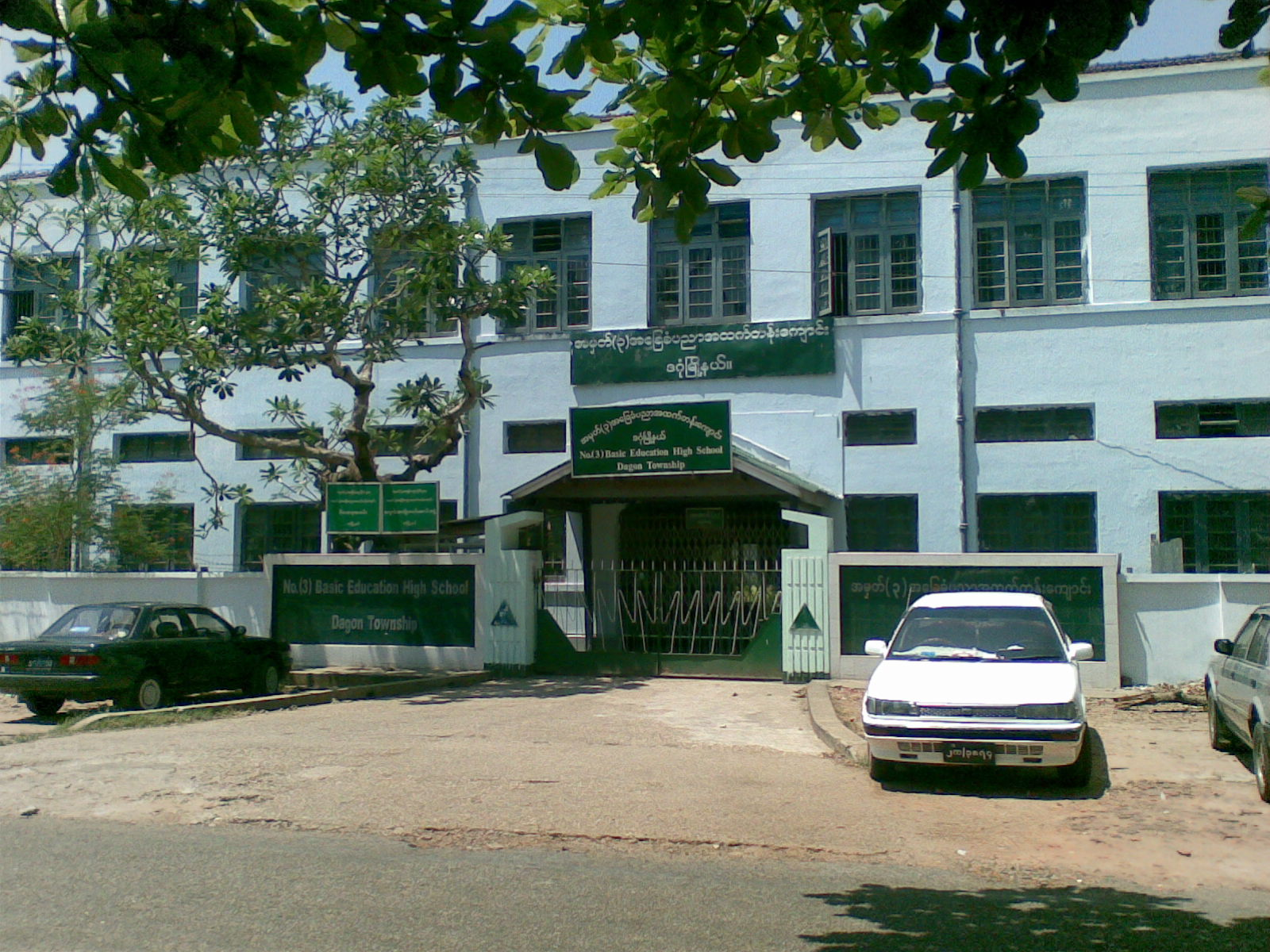
- Basic Education High School No. 3 Dagon

Location
- Dagon; Yangon, Yangon Region; Burma

Information
- Type: Public
- Established: March 1921
- School number: 3
- Grades: K–10

Basic Education High School No. 3 Dagon (Burmese: အခြေခံ ပညာ အထက်တန်း ကျောင်း အမှတ် (၃) ဒဂုံ) is a public high school located a few miles north of downtown Yangon, Myanmar. It was formerly Myoma Girls National High School founded at 32nd Street in downtown Yangon in March 1921 as a sister school of Myoma Boys National High School. The school was moved to its current location in 1929.

== Alumni ==
- Khin Hnin Yu: Writer
