= 32nd Street =

32nd Street may refer to:

- 32nd Street, Yangon, Myanmar
- 32nd Street (Manhattan), New York
- 32nd Street (Washington, D.C.)
- 32nd Street Armory, Philadelphia, Pennsylvania
- 32nd Street Naval Station, San Diego Trolley
- 32nd & Commercial station, San Diego Trolley
