= 32nd Street, Yangon =

Street in Yangon, Myanmar

Downtown Yangon; 32nd Street is located towards the lower center.

32nd Street is a narrow north-to-south street located in Pabedan Township and adjacent to Sule Pagoda Road in Yangon, Myanmar. Generally, the street is divided into 3 blocks, similar to other streets in downtown Yangon. The street's major divisions include the Upper Block (between Bogyoke Aung San Road and Anawrahta Road), the Middle Block (between Anawrahta and Maha Bandula Road), and the combination of the two blocks between Merchant Road and Maha Bandula Road, and between Merchant Road and Strand Road, collectively called the Lower Blocks. The street is located near the Clover City Center.

== Blocks ==
=== Lower blocks ===
- One of the Lower Blocks of the road (between Konthe Road and Strand Road) is mainly occupied by Myanma Economic Bank and the KBZ Square building. There are no residential buildings.
- Within the Lower Blocks between (Maha Bandula Road and Strand Road) is the site of the former MOGE (Myanma Oil and Gas Enterprise) Building, Dawei House, Centerpoint Tower, Guest houses and residential buildings. Printing houses, offices and roadside rubber stamp makers are also located in this area.

=== Middle block ===
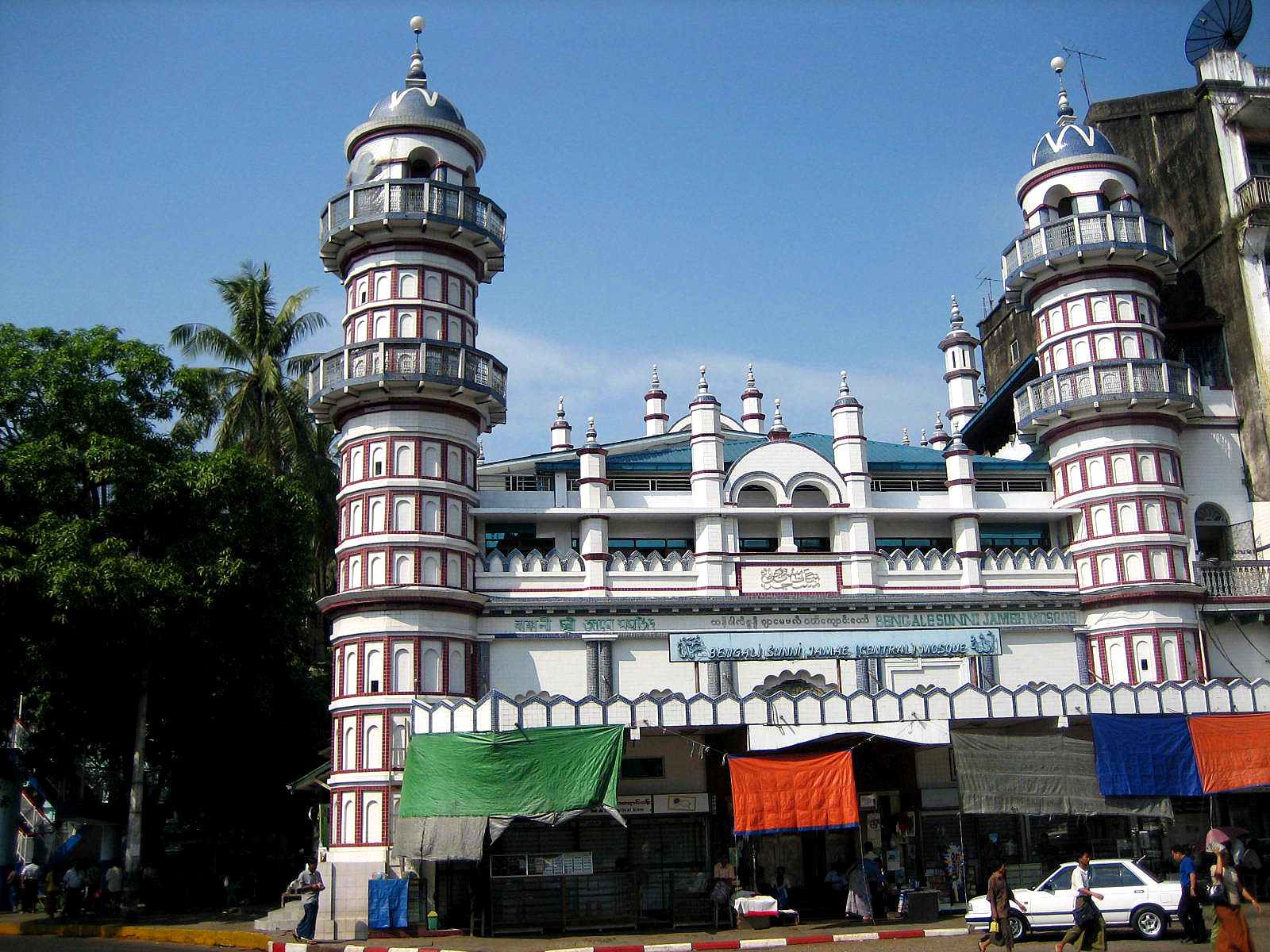
Bengali Sunni Jameh Mosque. Its back entrance is located on the Middle Block.

- The block between Badoola Road and Anawrahta Road is referred to as the "Middle Block". It is the area of printing houses and residential buildings. The back entrance of Mosque Sunni Bengali is also located here.

=== Upper block ===
- The block between Bogyoke Road and Anawrahta Road is referred to as the "UPPER BLOCK". It is also the area of printing houses, residential building, restaurants, hotels and the other side of the road is entirely occupied by Sule Shangri-La Hotel and its adjacent Hotel which is under construction.
