= Gamone Pwint =

Ga Mone Pwint
- Native name: ဂမုန်းပွင့်
- Type: Private
- Industry: Retail
- Founded: 1991; 35 years ago in Yangon, Myanmar
- Headquarters: Yangon, Myanmar
- Key people: Nay Lynn Oo, MD
- Website: gmp-myanmar.com

Ga Mone Pwint (Burmese: ဂမုန်းပွင့်; GMP) is a Burmese conglomerate. Ga Mone Pwint is presently headed by Managing Director Nay Lynn Oo. The company runs major shopping centers in Yangon.

== Stores ==
- Naypyitaw Ga Mone Pwint
- Myaynigone Ga Mone Pwint
- Bogalay Ga Mone Pwint
- Thein Gyi Zay Ga Mone Pwint
- Kaba Aye Ga Mone Pwint
- San Yeik Nyein Ga Mone Pwint
- Kan Taw Lay Ga Mone Pwint (Wholesale Mall)

== See also ==
- City Mart Holdings
- Sein Gay Har
