= U Tin =

Sithu U Tin
- စည်သူ ဦးတင်
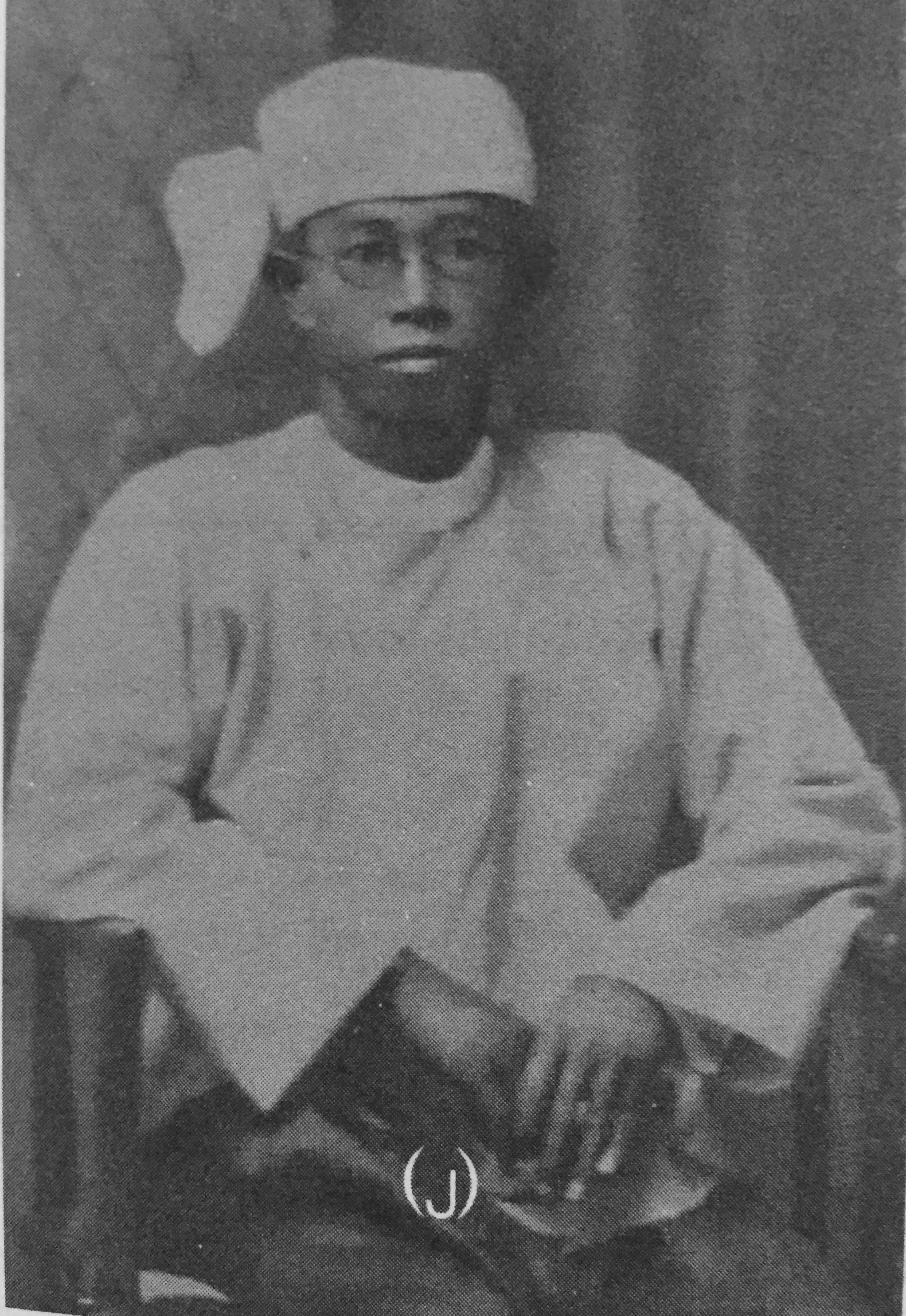
- Born: 1890
- Died: 1972 (aged 81–82)
- Occupation: Architect
- Spouse: Khin Thet Tin

Sithu U Tin (1890–1972) was a prominent Burmese architect and engineer, best known for designing the Yangon City Hall, the Yangon Central Railway Station and Basic Education High School No. 2 Dagon (formerly Myoma High School). He was known for his syncretic architectural style fusing indigenous elements, such as tiered roofs called pyatthat, with Western designs.

== See also ==
- Yangon City Hall
- Yangon Central Railway Station
- Architecture of Myanmar
