= Yegyaw Market =

Major market in Yangon, Myanmar

Yegyaw Market ရေကျော်ဈေး
- Location: Pazundaung Township, Yangon, Myanmar; 16.779650237577286°N 96.17082946602817°E
- Opening date: 1924; 102 years ago
- Management: Yangon City Development Committee
- Goods sold: Wet and dry
- Number of tenants: 272
- Total retail floor area: .797 acres (34,700 ft^{2})
- Interactive map of Yegyaw Market

Yegyaw Market (Burmese: ရေကျော်ဈေး) is a public markets in Pazundaung Township, Yangon, Myanmar. The market opened in 1924 and contains 272 shops across an area of 0.797 acres (0.323 ha). The area around the market hosts an annual night market called Yegyaw Funfair & Bazaar during the Thadingyut Festival, which marks the end of the Buddhist Lent. It is considered one of the most crowded festivals in Yangon.

The original Yegyaw Market was established in 1924. The reconstruction of the new market began on 24 February 2014 and was completed on 17 February 2016. The new market building was officially opened on 3 October 2016. It is an 8½-story building with modern facilities.
