= Win Win Tint =

Burmese businesswoman and entrepreneur

- ဝင်းဝင်းတင့်
- Born: 1975 (age 50–51); Yangon, Myanmar
- Education: Thames Business School
- Occupations: Businesswoman, Entrepreneur
- Known for: Founder and CEO of City Mart Holdings
- Awards: Young Global Leader (2013); Asia's 50 Power Businesswomen (2014)

Win Win Tint (Burmese: ဝင်းဝင်းတင့်; born 1975) is a Burmese businesswoman, entrepreneur and CEO of City Holdings. She was listed in Forbes Magazine’s Asia’s 50 Power Businesswomen in 2014.

== Early life ==
Win Win Tint was born in Yangon in 1975. She took over her family business at the age of 21 after coming back from studying in Singapore.

== Business ==
At the age of just 21, Win Win assumed the management of City Mart Holding Company Limited (CMHL), a recently-formed family company. She expanded the City Mart supermarket chain and launched bakeries, cafes, health and beauty stores, as well as other food and beverage brands that have since become household names in Myanmar. She now leads a group with over 200 outlets and 8,500 employees. She is also President of the Myanmar Retailers Association. She also founded the Pahtama Group, one of the country’s fastest-growing distributors of consumer products, and currently serves as president of the Myanmar Retailers’ Association. In 2019, Win Win became the Group CEO of City Holdings, the group company with the strategic interests to further strengthen the group’s existing network in Retail through the largest retail chain in Myanmar – CMHL, Distribution & Logistics, through their logistics company Premium Distribution and Pahtama Group, F&B via City Food Concepts and Real Estate with City Properties. The group also pursues other opportunities in complementary sectors including Agriculture, Food Manufacturing, Technology and Finance via City Ventures which is exclusively established to invest in innovative projects and companies with the aim to uplift and empower the people of Myanmar.

== Awards and nominations ==
In 2012 she was appointed a Young Global Leader by the World Economic Forum. In 2015 she was ranked by Forbes Magazine as one of the 50 most powerful businesswomen in Asia-Pacific. She has also found success in the ASEAN Business Awards: in 2014 she won runner up in the Woman Entrepreneur Award and in 2016 she won the Young Entrepreneur Award. In Addition, Win Win is serving as the Honorary President of the Myanmar Retailers Association.
