= High Court of Yangon Region =

- ရန်ကုန်တိုင်းဒေသကြီးတရားလွှတ်တော်
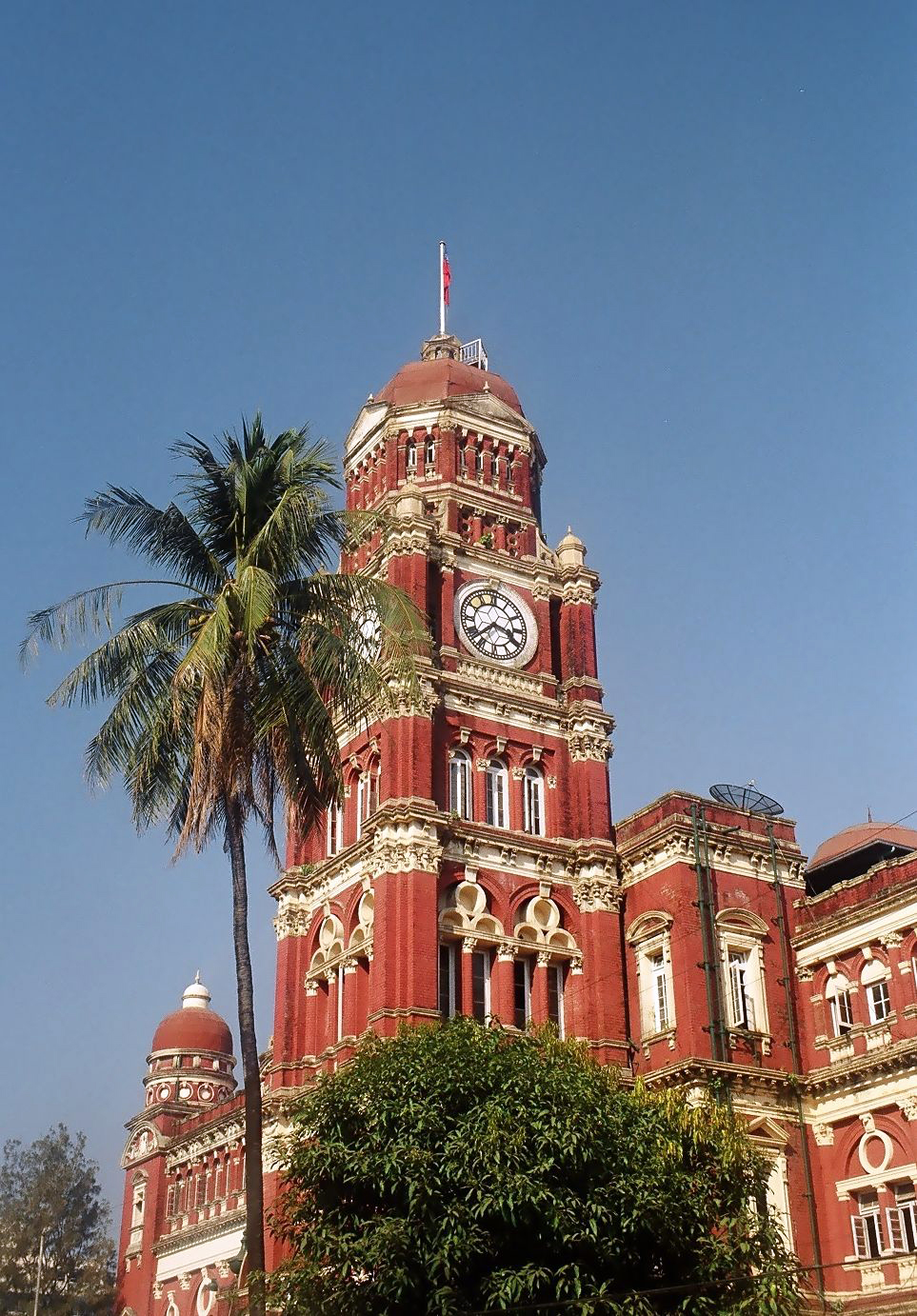
- Jurisdiction: Yangon Region
- Location: High Court Building, Yangon
- Authorised by: Constitution of Myanmar
- Judge term length: Lifetime
- Number of positions: 3-7

Chief Justice
- Currently: Sandar Thwe
- Since: March 23, 2022; 4 years ago

The High Court of Yangon Region (Burmese: ရန်ကုန်တိုင်းဒေသကြီးတရားလွှတ်တော်) serves as the regional high court of Yangon Region. The High Court was established under the Union Judiciary Law of 2010, in accordance with section 443 of the Constitution of Myanmar. The High Court resides in the High Court Building, an iconic colonial-era building in Kyauktada Township.

In February 2010, Win Swe, a director of the criminal justice department of the Yangon Division High Court, was appointed the Chief Justice of the High Court by the Yangon Region

On 23 March 2022, Sandar Thwe replaced Win Swe as Chief Justice of the High Court of Yangon Region.

== Membership ==
The high court of a state or region has at least three to a maximum of seven judges, including the Chief Justice. The current Chief Justice of the Yangon Region High Court is Daw Sandar Thwe.

== Responsibilities ==
The Yangon Region High Court is responsible for:

- Adjudicating on original case;
- Adjudicating on appeal case;
- Adjudicating on revisional case;
- Adjudicating on matters prescribed by any law.

The High Court is also responsible for administering and supervising all subordinate courts within Yangon Region, such as the District Courts, Township Courts, Juvenile Courts, Municipal Courts, and Traffic Courts.
