= Pazundaung Market =

Major public market in Yangon, Myanmar

Pazundaung Market ပုဇွန်တောင်ဈေး
- Location: Pazundaung Township, Yangon, Myanmar; 16.781738203395978°N 96.17460117785565°E
- Opening date: 8 May 1958; 68 years ago
- Management: Yangon City Development Committee
- Goods sold: Wet and dry
- Number of tenants: 1,938
- Interactive map of Pazundaung Market

Pazundaung Market (Burmese: ပုဇွန်တောင်ဈေး) is a public market located in Pazundaung Township, Yangon, Myanmar. The market opened on 8 May 1958 and contains 1,938 shops across an area of 5.848 acres (2.367 ha). It serves as a major municipal market for eastern Yangon. The market is also a major rice distribution hub for rice brokers. An informal street market has developed near the market along Kwetthit Street.

The open area in front of the market is often affected by litter and is used as a venue for municipal public programs, such as waste management and pollution control awareness campaigns organized by the YCDC's Pollution Control and Cleansing Department.
