= Supreme Court of Myanmar =

Highest court in Myanmar

Coordinates: 16.7731°N 96.1609°E

Supreme Court of the Republic of the Union of Myanmar
- ပြည်ထောင်စုတရားလွှတ်တော်ချုပ်
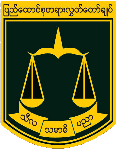
- Interactive map of Supreme Court of the Republic of the Union of Myanmar
- Established: 1948
- Jurisdiction: Myanmar
- Location: Naypyidaw
- Motto: သီလ၊ သမာဓိ၊ ပညာ Pali: sīla, samādhi, paññā
- Authorised by: Constitution of Myanmar
- Judge term length: 70 years retirement age
- Number of positions: 11
- Website: www.unionsupremecourt.gov.mm

Chief Justice
- Currently: Thar Htay
- Since: 3 August 2023

The Supreme Court of Myanmar (Burmese: ပြည်ထောင်စုတရားလွှတ်တော်ချုပ်) is the highest judicial forum and final court of appeal under the Constitution of Myanmar, existing as an independent judicial entity, alongside the legislative and executive branches. The Court is legally mandated to have 7 to 11 judges, including a Chief Justice.

== Jurisdiction ==
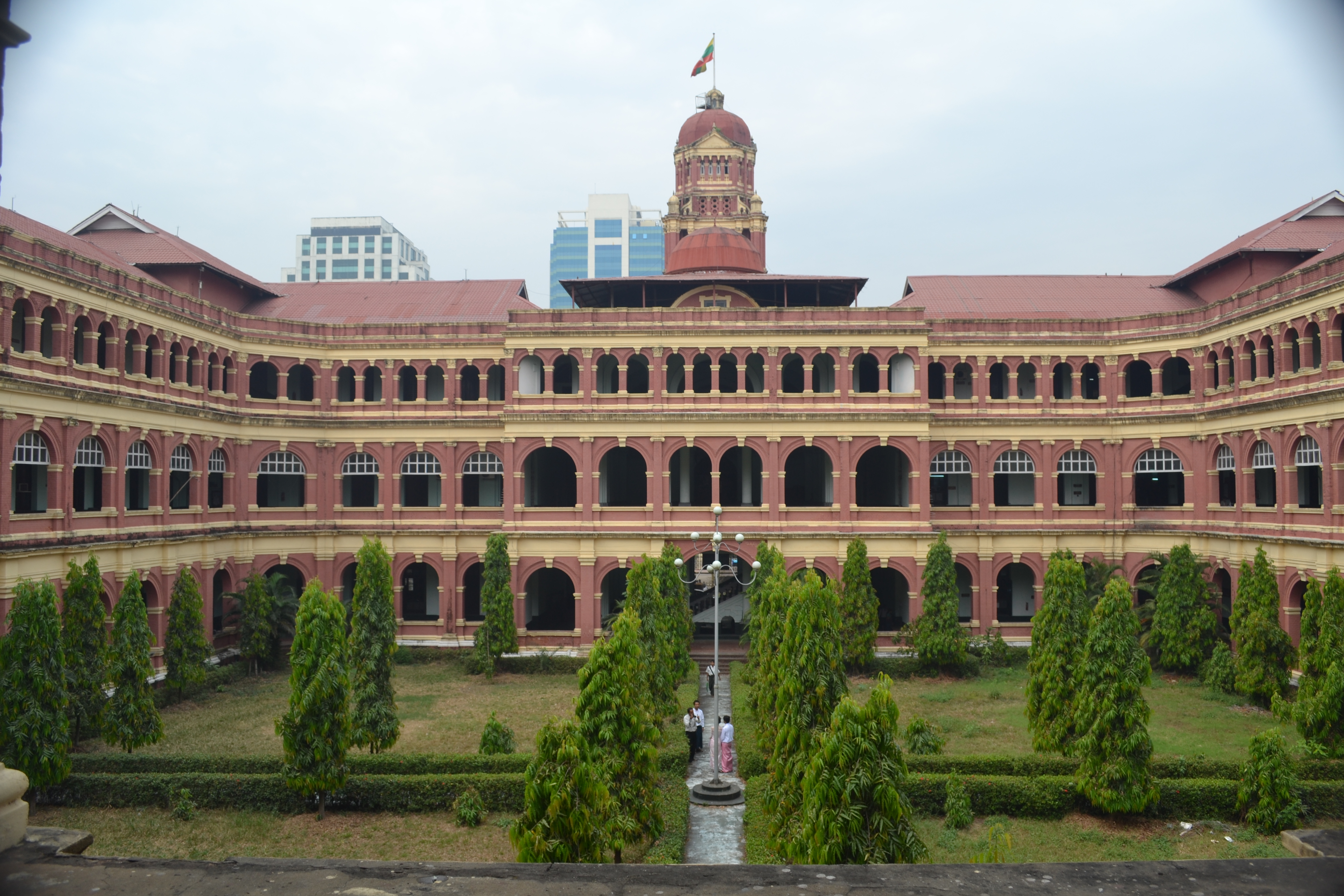
former building in Yangon

Without affecting the powers of the Constitutional Tribunal and the Courts-Martial, the Supreme Court of the Union is the highest Court of the Union of Myanmar. The Supreme Court of the Union has both original and appellate jurisdiction in both civil and criminal cases. Moreover, it has the revisional jurisdiction against the judgment or order passed by a court in accordance with the law and in confirming the death sentence. Furthermore, it exercises the power of issuing five kinds of writs without affecting the power of other courts to issue orders that have the nature of writs in accordance with law. At the Supreme Court of the Union, cases may be adjudicated by a bench of one Justice or more than one justice or by the Full Bench.

Being the ultimate authority of the entire court system of Myanmar, the Supreme Court of the Union administers and supervises all subordinate courts in Myanmar. It is also entitled the right of submitting the bills relating to the Judiciary to the Legislative, called the Union Parliament (Pyidaungsu Hluttaw) in accordance with the stipulated manners.

== History ==
=== Development ===
The various levels of courts were founded via the Union Judiciary Act, 1948. The first Chief Justice of independent Burma (Myanmar) was a Cambridge-educated lawyer called Dr. Ba U, who later became the 2nd President of the Union of Burma. Dr. Ba U served as Chief Justice from 1948 to 1952.

== Facilities ==
Until 2006, the Supreme Court of Myanmar was located at No. 89/133 Pansodan Street, between Maha Bandula Garden Street and Pansodan Street in Kyauktada Township, downtown Yangon. The building complex was designed by architect James Ransome. Construction of the court began in 1905 and was completed in 1911.

The current Supreme Court is located at No.54, Thiri Mandaing Street, Naypyidaw, the country's new capital since 2006.

== Composition of the court ==
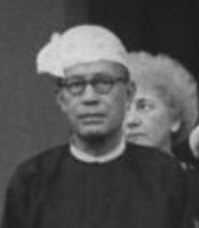
The Honourable Dr. Ba U, Chief Justice from 1948–1952

The Supreme Court of Myanmar is composed of 7 to 11 Justices: the Chief Justice of the Union and 6 to 10 other Justices. According to the Constitution of Myanmar, remuneration and salary of the Chief Justice of the Union is equivalent to Vice-President of Myanmar and of justices of the Supreme Court of the Union are equivalent to deputy ministers of the Cabinet of Myanmar. The Chief Justice and Justices of the Supreme Court of the Union are entitled to be referred to as "The Honourable".

=== Appointment process ===
The Chief Justice of the Union is nominated by the President of Myanmar. Appointments are officially made by approval of the Union Parliament (Pyidaungsu Hluttaw).

In February 2011, President Thein Sein nominated Htun Htun Oo as Chief Justice. The Pyidaungsu Hluttaw approved his nomination on 17 February 2011. In June 2017, President Htin Kyaw nominated Mya Han, Myo Tint, Soe Naing and Khin Maung Kyi as new justices. Moreover, as Mya Thein was retired from being supreme court justice, a new justice called Myo Win from Pathein was appointed upon nomination of President Win Myint in November 2018.

== Union Supreme Court (2026-Present) ==
On 10 April 2026, the Supreme Court of the Union was constituted with the following individuals.

	Name	
1	Tha Htay	Chief Justice of the Union
2	Thaung Naing	Justice
3	Thein Ko Ko	Justice
4	Thin Thin Nwet	Justice
5	Pyone Pyone Aye	Justice
6	Dr Ko Ko Naing	Justice
7	Win Myint	Justice
8	Soe Khet Khet	Justice
9	Thin Thin Cho	Justice

== Former Justices ==
	Name		Start date/	Length of service	Appointed by
1	Tha Htay	Chief Justice of the Union	3 August 2023	2 years, 272 days	State Administration Council
2	Myo Tint	Justice	14 June 2017	8 years, 322 days	President Htin Kyaw
3	Myo Maung	Justice	4 February 2021	5 years, 87 days	State Administration Council
4	Kyi Thein	Justice	4 February 2021	5 years, 87 days	State Administration Council
5	Khin Maung Gyi	Justice	7 February 2021	5 years, 84 days	State Administration Council
6	Khin May Yee	Justice	7 February 2021	5 years, 84 days	State Administration Council
7	Thaung Naing	Justice	14 March 2022	4 years, 49 days	State Administration Council
8	Thein Ko Ko	Justice	14 March 2022	4 years, 49 days	State Administration Council
9	Thin Thin Nwet	Justice	14 March 2022	4 years, 49 days	State Administration Council
10	Pyone Pyone Aye	Justice	18 August 2022	3 years, 257 days	State Administration Council
11	Dr Ko Ko Naing	Justice	10 August 2024	1 year, 265 days	State Administration Council

Name	Date Appointed	Mandatory retirement	Nominating President	Previous judicial posting(s)	Education
Htun Htun Oo (Chief Justice)	30 March 2011	28 July 2026 (2 August 2023)	Thein Sein	Deputy Chief Justice (2007–2011)	B.A. (Law), LL.B (Rangoon University)
Tha Htay(Chief Justice)	30 March 2011 (3 August 2023)	2028	Thein Sein (Senior General Min Aung Hlaing)	Union Election Commission member	LL.B (Rangoon University)
Myint Aung	30 March 2011	2022	Thein Sein	Rangoon Regional High Court judge	B.A (Psychology), Higher Grade Pleadership Certificate (1981)
Aung Zaw Thein	30 March 2011	2027	Thein Sein	Assistant Judge Advocate General	B.A. (Law), LL.B (Rangoon University)
Myo Win	15 November 2018	14 November 2030	Win Myint	Advocate	LL.B (Rangoon University)
Mya Han	14 June 2017	2023	Htin Kyaw	Advocate	B.A. (Law), LL.B (Rangoon University), Dip in Business Management, Dip in Maritime Law
Myo Tint	14 June 2017	2026	Htin Kyaw	Director General of Supreme Court	LL.B (Rangoon University)
Soe Naing	14 June 2017	2025	Htin Kyaw	Mandalay Region Law Officer	B.A. (Law), LL.B (Rangoon University)
Khin Maung Kyi	14 June 2017	2028	Htin Kyaw	Advocate	LL.B (Mandalay Arts and Science University)
