= Maha Bandula Garden Street =

Street in Yangon, Myanmar

Coordinates: 16°46′27.6″N 96°09′36.9″E

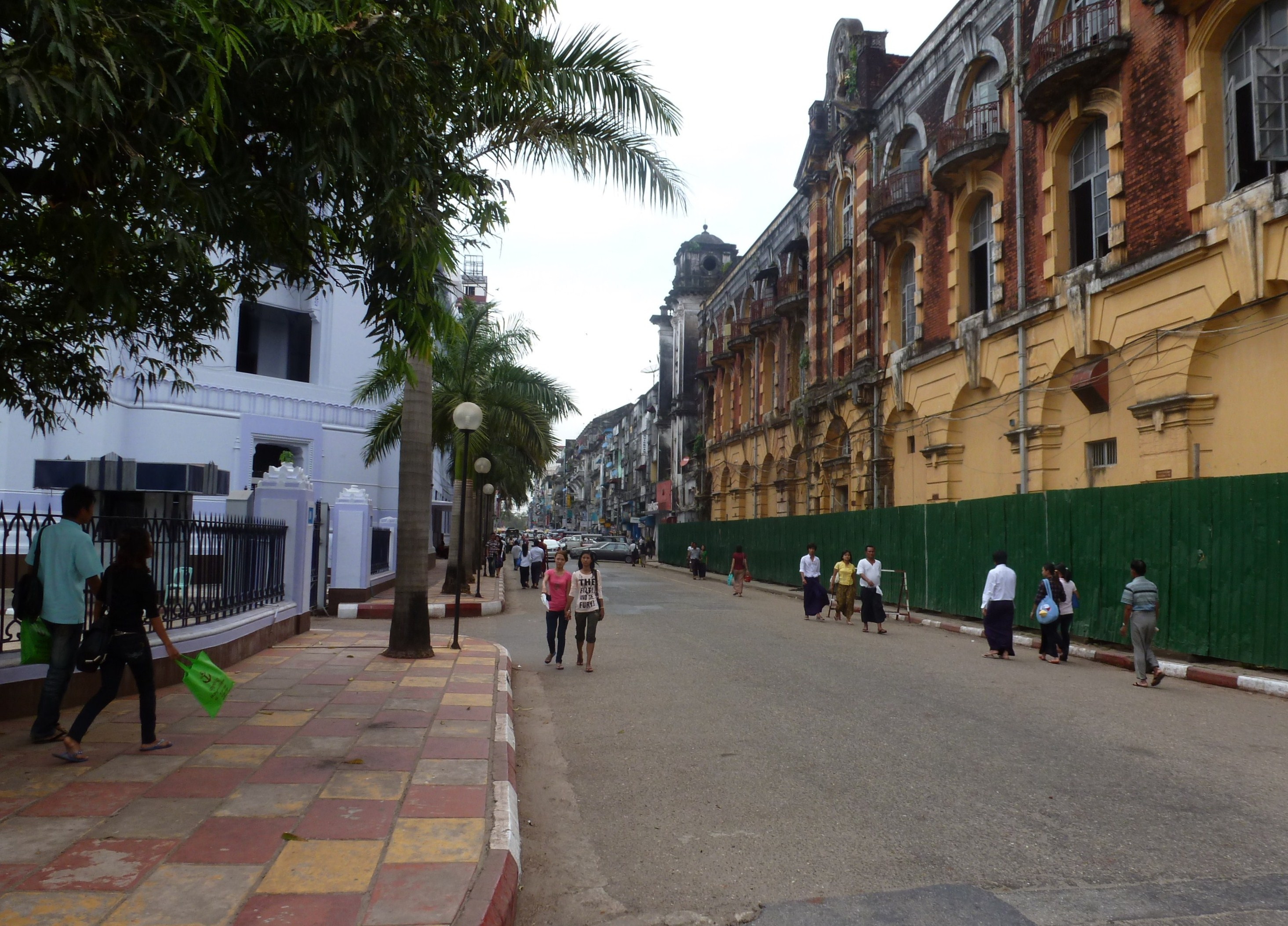
Maha Bandula Garden Street, looking north

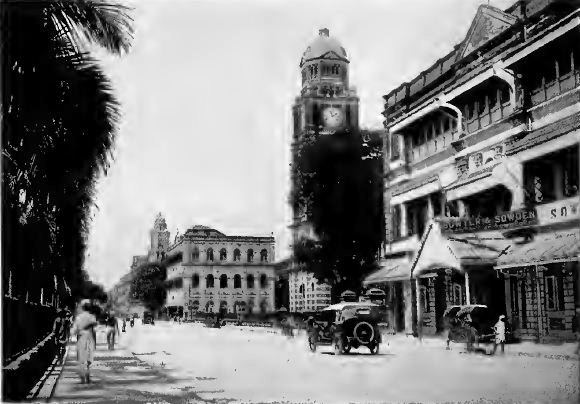
Barr Street in 1890s

Maha Bandula Garden Street (Burmese: မဟာဗန္ဓုလပန်းခြံလမ်း, formerly Barr Street) is a street of Yangon, Burma. It is located in downtown Yangon, in the Kyauktada Township and runs past the eastern side of Maha Bandula Park.
