= Yangon City Hall =

Government building in Myanmar

- ရန်ကုန် မြို့တော်ခန်းမ
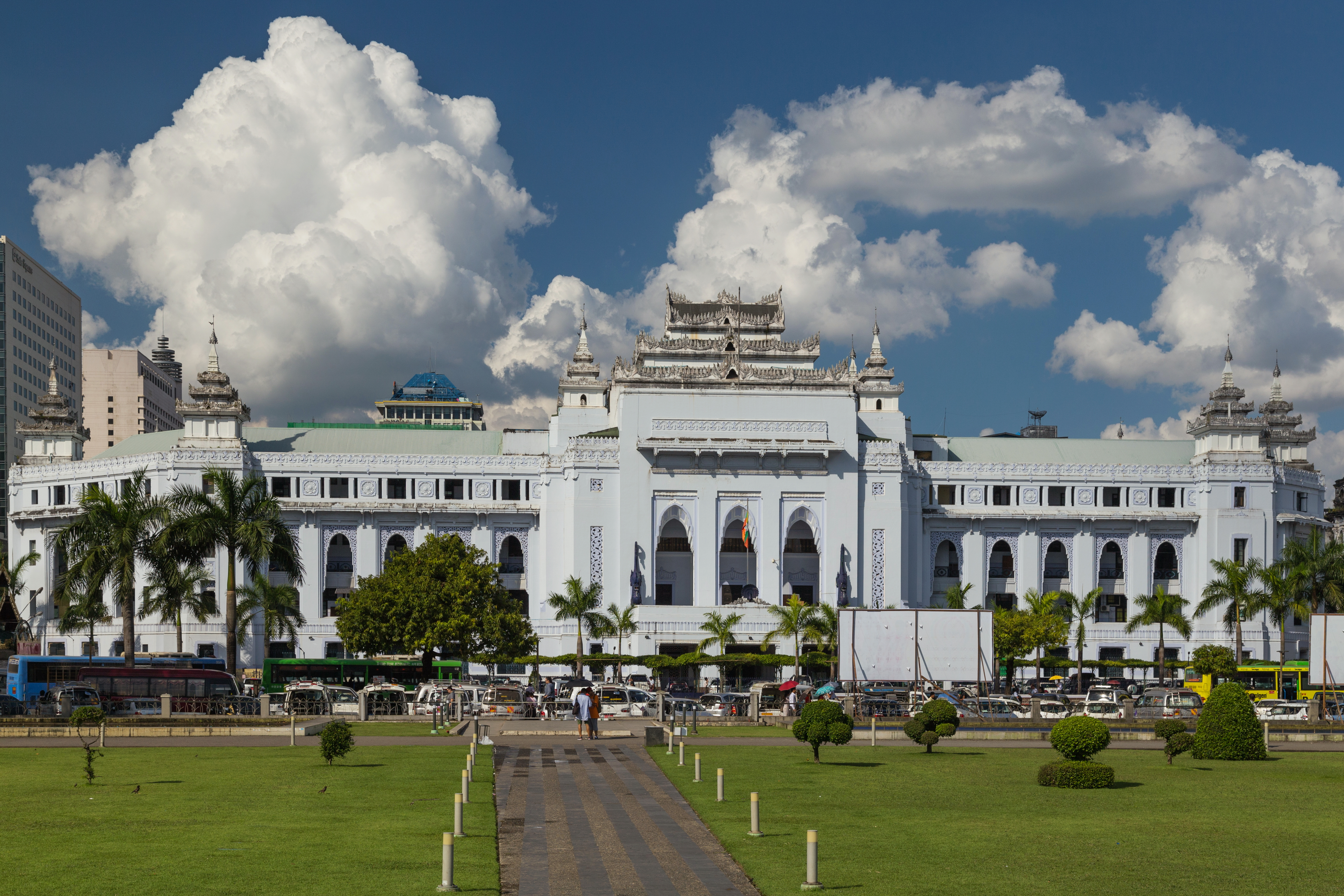
- Yangon City Hall in 2016
- Interactive map of the Yangon City Hall area

General information
- Type: Government office
- Architectural style: Syncretic (Burmese and European)
- Location: Maha Bandula Park Street, Yangon, Myanmar
- Coordinates: 16.7745°N 96.1589°E
- Construction started: 1926
- Completed: 1936
- Opened: 1936
- Renovated: N/A
- Cost: Unknown
- Client: Rangoon Municipal Committee
- Owner: Yangon City Development Committee (YCDC)

Technical details
- Structural system: Reinforced concrete
- Material: Concrete, stucco, timber (for ornamentation)
- Floor count: 3

Design and construction
- Architect: Sithu U Tin

Website
- www.ycdc.gov.mm

Designations

Yangon City Landmark

Yangon City Hall (Burmese: ရန်ကုန်မြို့တော်ခန်းမ; YCH) is the city hall of Yangon, the largest city of Myanmar, and the seat of the city's administrative body, Yangon City Development Committee (YCDC). The building is considered a fine example of syncretic Burmese architecture, featuring traditional tiered roofs called pyatthat. It was designed by Burmese architect U Tin, who also designed Yangon Central railway station. Construction began in 1926 and ended in 1936. The city hall occupies the former site of the Ripon Hall.

The City Hall has been the focal point of several major political demonstrations, including a 1964 People's Peace Committee rally supported by Thakin Kodaw Hmaing, which attracted 200,000 people and was subsequently clamped down on by Ne Win's military junta. It has also been the site of several bombings, including those in 2000, 2008, and 2009.

Centrally located in downtown Yangon, it is next to several important landmarks such as Sule Pagoda, Maha Bandula Park, High Court, and the Main Post Office.

The building is listed on the Yangon City Heritage List.

== Gallery ==
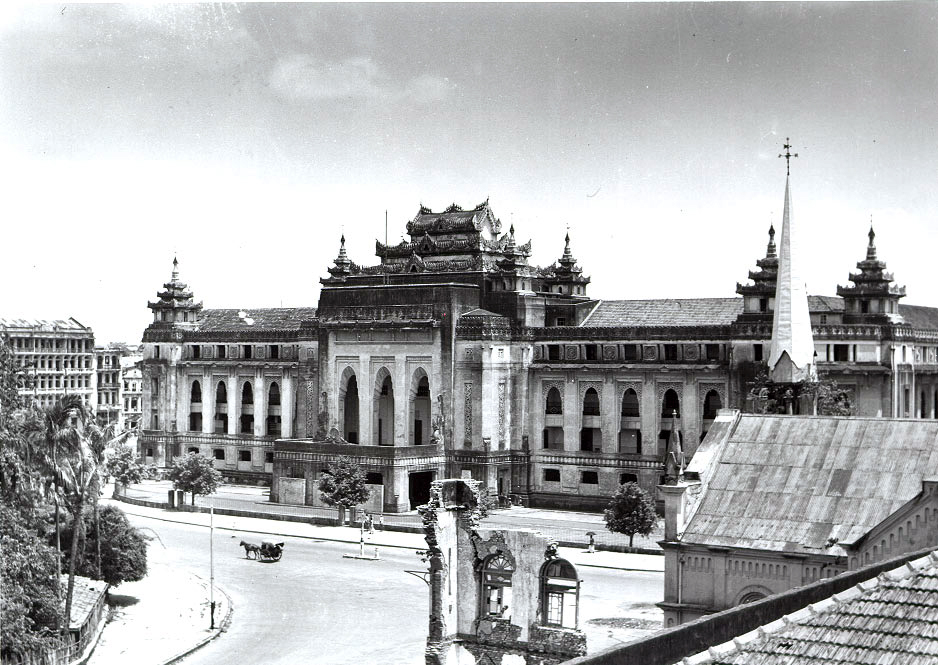
Yangon City Hall in 1945, after World War II

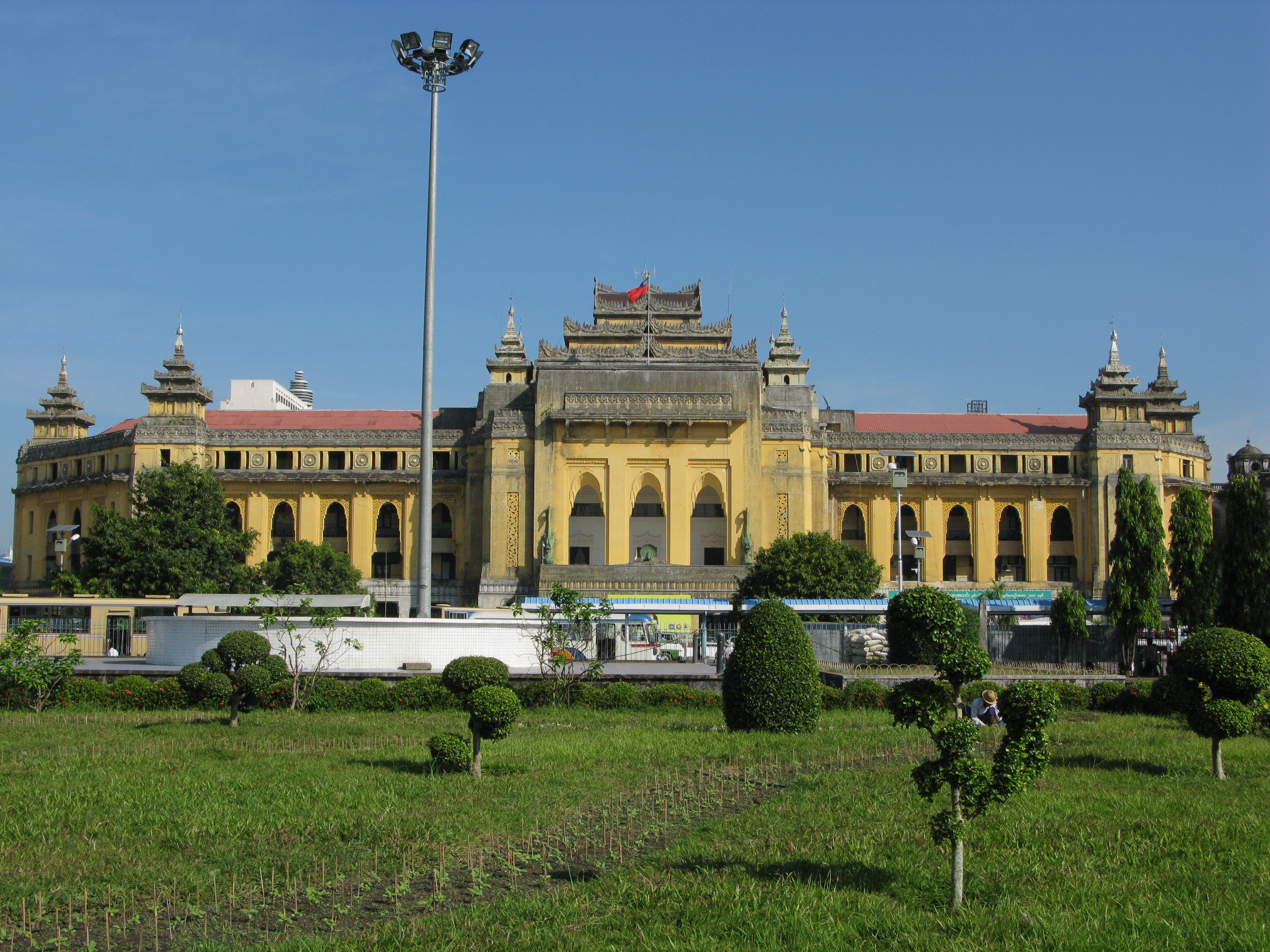
Yangon City Hall in 2008

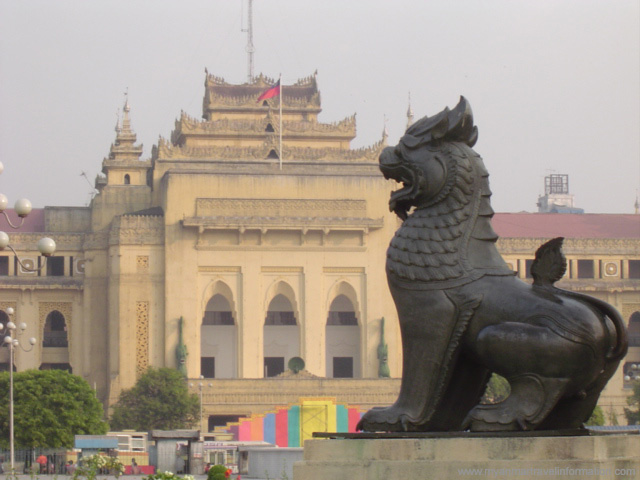
Yangon City Hall seen from Maha Bandula Park

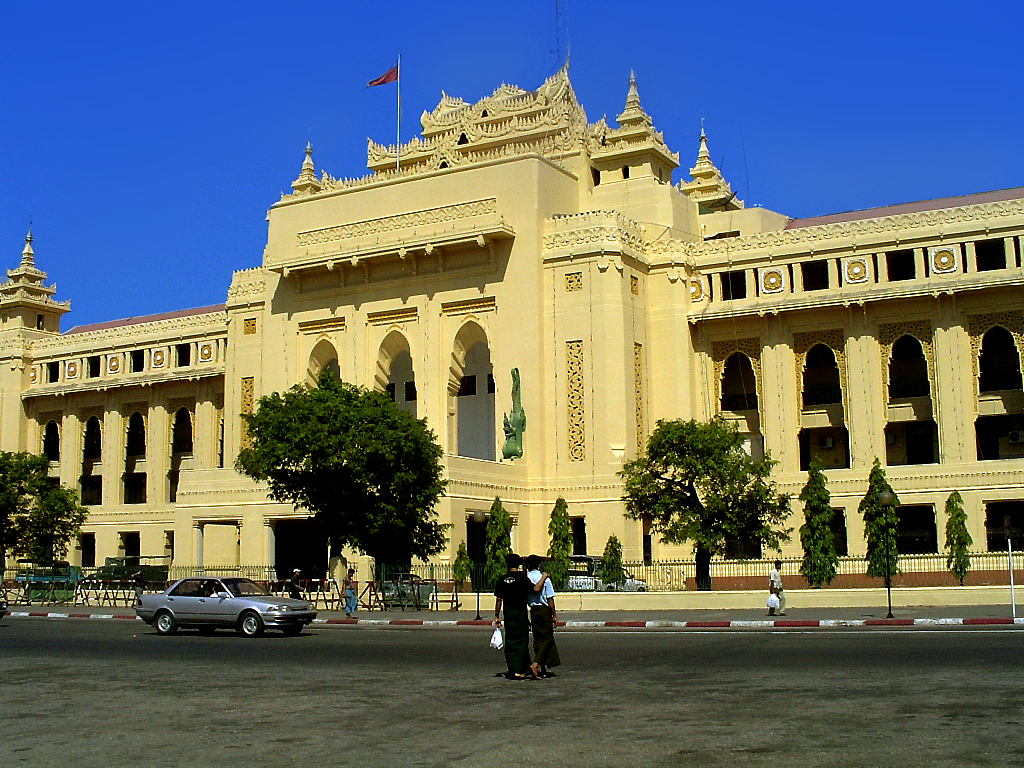
Yangon City Hall
