= Sule Pagoda Road =

Road in Yangon, Myanmar

Coordinates: 16°46′29.4″N 96°09′31.5″E

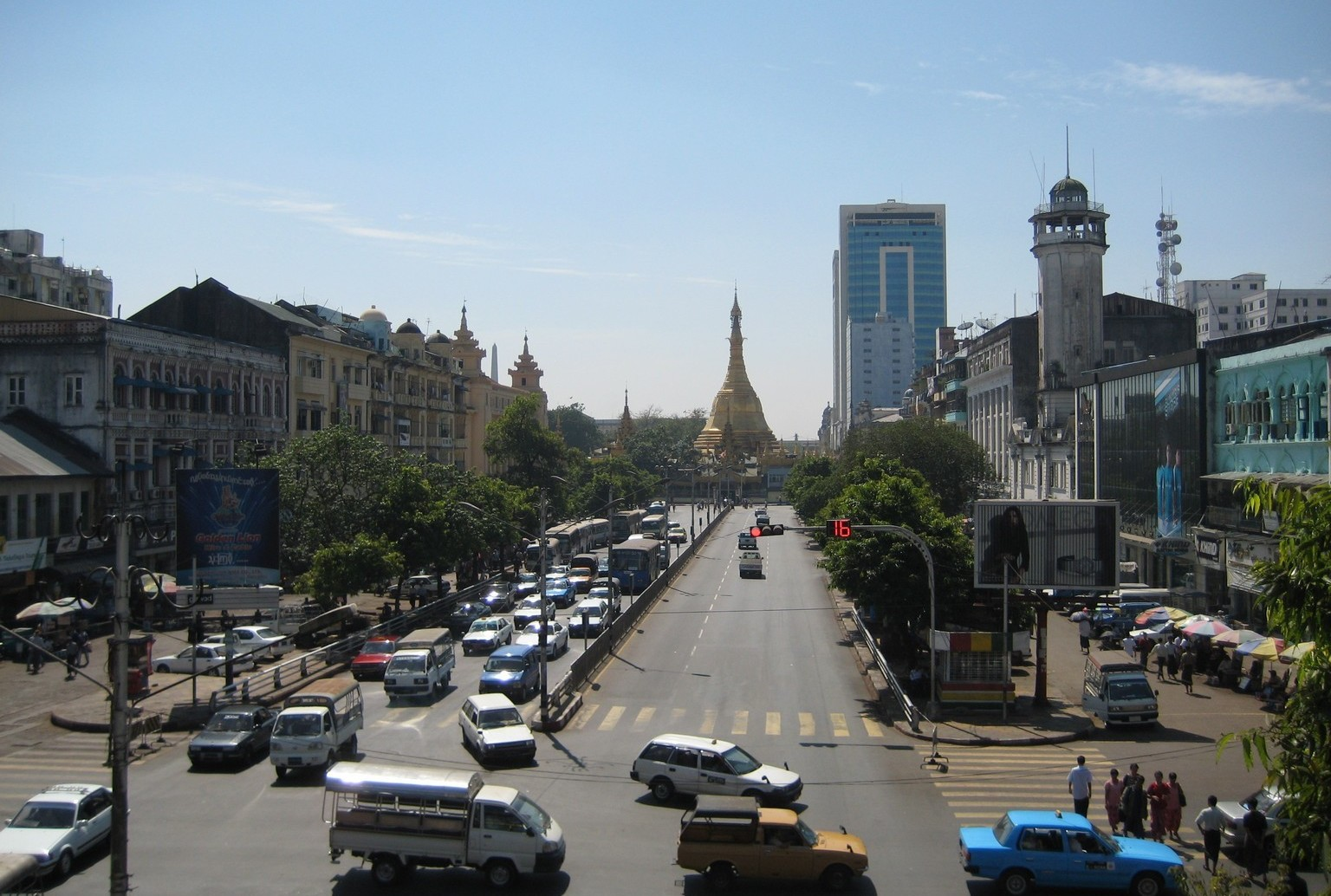
Sule Pagoda Road, looking south towards the Sule Pagoda

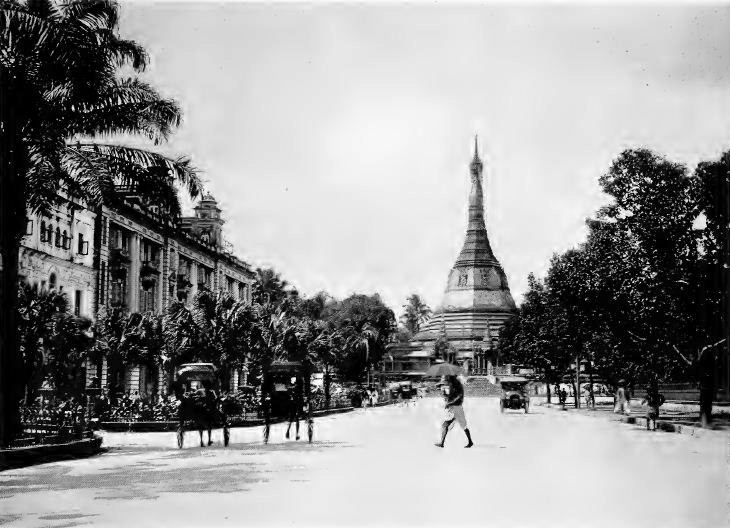
Sule Pagoda Road, looking north towards the Sule Pagoda in the 1890s

Sule Pagoda Road (Burmese: ဆူးလေဘုရားလမ်း) is a major thoroughfare of Yangon, the most populous city of Myanmar. It runs past Maha Bandula Park. The historically significant Burmese stupa Sule Pagoda is located on Sule Pagoda Road.

== See also ==
- 32nd Street, Yangon
