= Yangon Chinatown =

Neighborhood in Myanmar

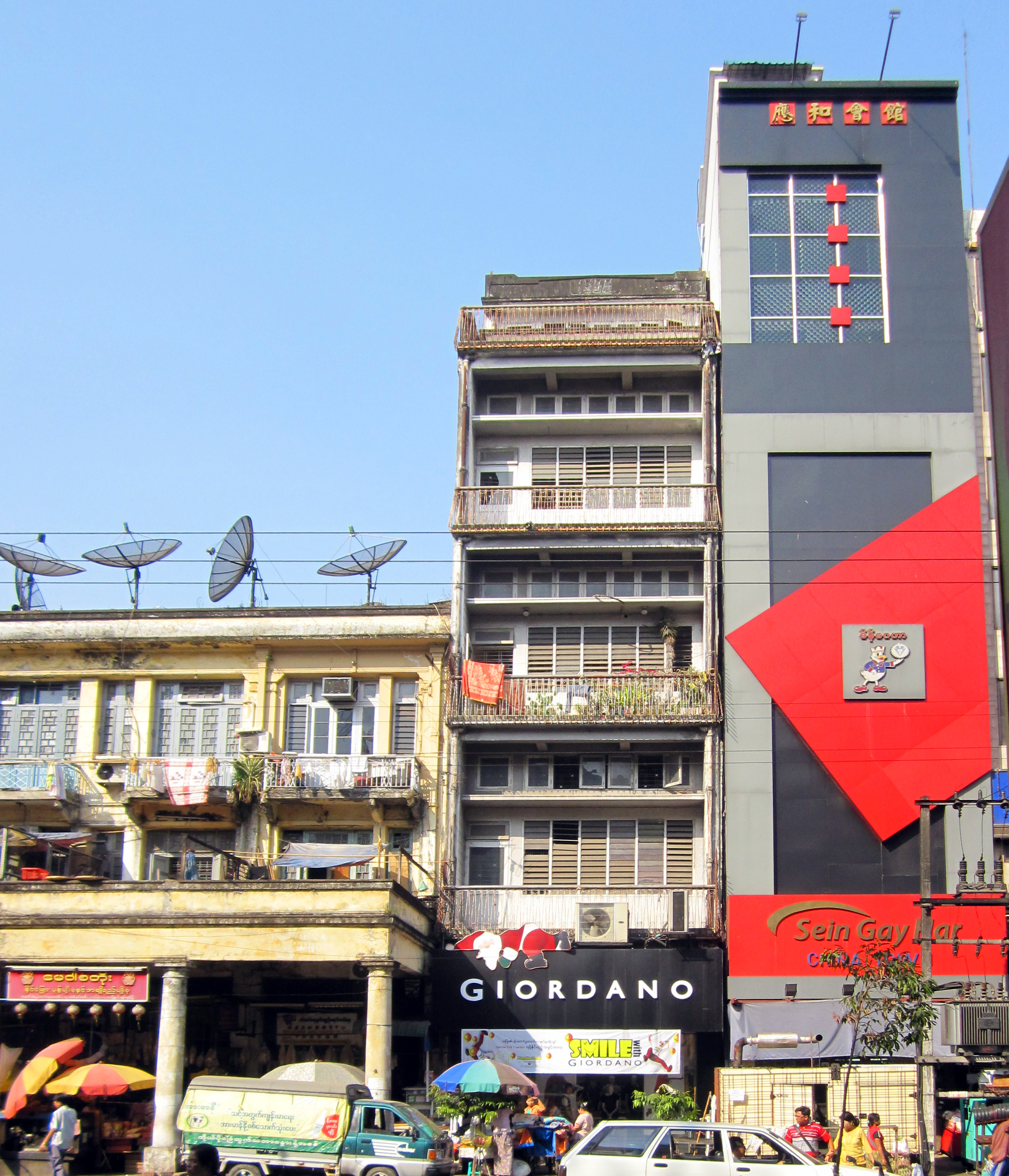
Businesses line the street of Yangon's Chinatown

The Chinatown of Yangon or so-called Tayoke Tan (Burmese: ရန်ကုန် တရုတ်တန်း; Chinese: 仰光唐人街) lies west of the Sule Pagoda which is located in the centre of Downtown Yangon. 19th Street, Yangon is the main centre of the city's Chinatown.

Proceeding west along the Sule Pagoda Road, the 24th, 23rd, 22nd, 20th, 19th and 18th Streets, as well as Bo Ywe, Latha and Sint Oh Dan Roads are steaming with traffic and make up the busiest quarters of the city, much like Chinatowns in other parts of the world. These roads fall under the Latha Township.

== History ==
Yangon's Chinatown was created when the British expanded the city in the 1850s (the city was then known as Rangoon in Burma). It lies between Shwedaungtan Street on the west and Shwedagon Pagoda Road on the east. The northern and southern borders are the Maha Bandula Road and the Strand Road.
