= Myaynigone Intersection =

Intersection in Yangon, Myanmar

Pyay Bagaya Intersection Zone
- Interactive map of Pyay Bagaya Intersection Zone
- Maintained by: City of Yangon
- Location: Intersection of Pyay Road and Bagaya Road, Yangon, Burma
- Coordinates: 16°48′13.7″N 96°08′14.9″E

Pyay Bagaya Intersection is a commercial market square located in Yangon, Burma, that is the busiest district place in Yangon after Sule Pagoda Roundabout.

== Site ==
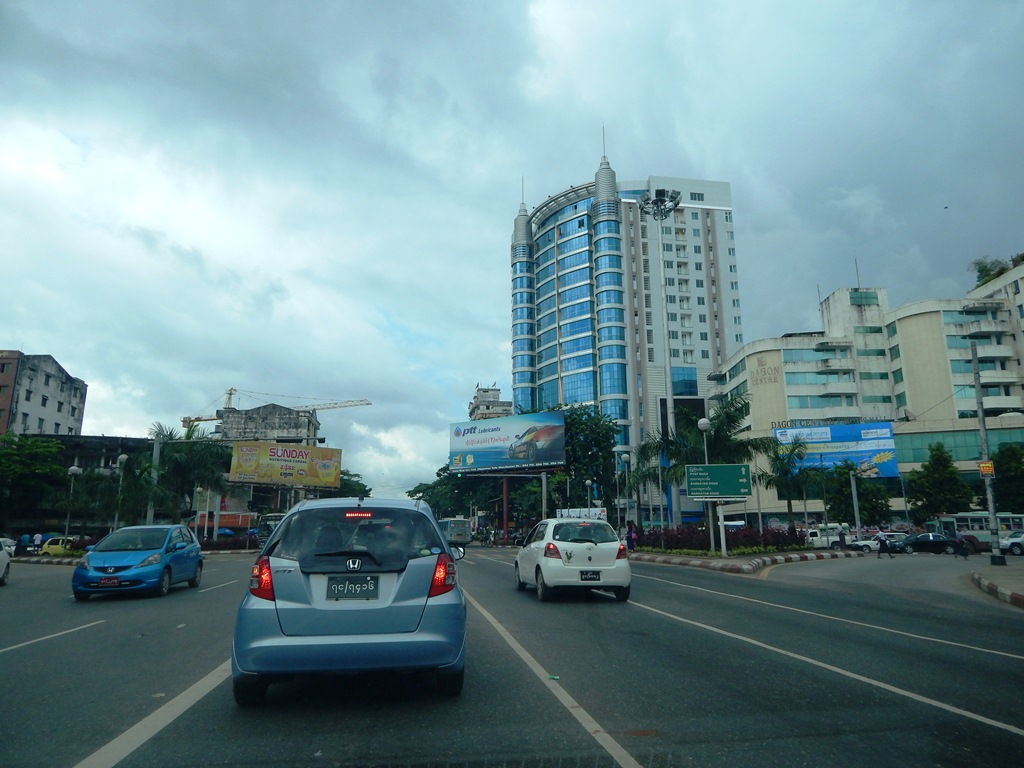
Myaynigone Intersection, Yangon, Burma

The site is bordered on the north by Dagon Centre Shopping Mall, on the east by Gamone Pwint shopping centre, on the south by Padonemar park and one other unknown small park.

== Surrounding Buildings ==
Sanchaung Intersection square is like Yangon version of New York's Times Square. There are a lot of advertising billboards including one LCD TV. Dagon centre shopping mall is one of the city’s busiest, located at a junction of Pyay Road and Bargayar Road. The Itwo4 DJ Lounge, Star Mart supermarket and MK Fashion shop dominate the ground floor. Branded shoes, bags and fabrics are sold here. The mall also includes snack shops and cafés. Some video production companies often come and shoot at Dagon Centre shopping mall. Myaynigone plaza is between Dagon Centre Shopping Mall and Gamone Pwint shopping centre. City Mart super market is a famous super market in Yangon. Video Production Companies also shoot at City Mart. Gamone Pwint shopping centre is just like Dagon Centre Shopping Mall. Padonemar Park is a small park. An unknown park is not a real park. but it has a fountain and a small pond.

== History ==
In 2005, there was a bomb explosion at Dagon Centre Shopping Mall. At least 11 people died in four near-simultaneous blasts in Yangon including Dagon Centre Shopping Mall.
