= City Mart Holdings =

Retailer in Myanmar

Coordinates: 16°48′10.8″N 96°08′08.1″E

City Mart Holding Co., Ltd.
- Native name: စီးတီးမတ် ဟိုးဒင်းလီမိတက်
- Type: Private
- Industry: Retail
- Founded: 1996 in Yangon, Myanmar
- Headquarters: No.1-11, Padonmar Stadium (East Wing), Bargayar Street, Sanchaung Township, Yangon, Myanmar
- Number of locations: 26
- Key people: Win Win Tint (founder & CEO)
- Brands: City Mart Supermarket; Ocean Supercentre; City Care Pharmacy; Seasons Bakery; Marketplace by City Mart; City Baby Club; City Books & Music; Popular Bookstore; City Express
- Number of employees: 8000
- Website: cmhl.com.mm

City Mart Holdings (CMHL, Burmese: စီးတီးမတ် ဟိုးဒင်း) is one of Myanmar’s largest retail outlet, employing more than 8,000 employees. The City Mart Group started as a modern supermarket in 1996 in the north wing of Bogyoke Aung San Stadium but has since expanded into many different aspects of modern retail trade such as supermarkets, pharmacies, bookstores, baby stores, convenience stores and bakery & coffee shops. The stores are primarily located in the cities of Yangon, Mandalay and Naypyitaw, but it has also expanded into some major towns in Upper Myanmar.

City Mart Holdings Co., Ltd. was ranked 31 in Myanmar for the fiscal year 13/14 Income Tax Ranking, and 5 for the Commercial Tax Ranking Myanmar Index.

== Businesses under CMHL ==
=== City Mart Supermarkets ===
The City Mart Supermarkets cater to urban households focusing on food and lifestyle. As of 2016, 26 City Mart Supermarkets have opened in Yangon and Mandalay. Many City Mart Supermarkets have pop-up stores inside them for beauty products, pharmacy, wine & spirits, kitchen utensils etc. Most stores have a wide selection of foreign products.

=== Ocean Supercenters ===
Ocean Supercenter was the first hypermarket to open in Myanmar in 2006. They are known as the one-stop place for shopping for food, clothing, beauty products, household products and much more. As of 2016, there are 10 Ocean Super centers located in Yangon, Mandalay, Naypyidaw, Monywar, Mawlamyaing and Pathein.

=== marketplace by City Mart ===
Marketplaces by City Mart offer a wider range of international and premium products in Yangon. They offer special treats like locally produced coffee and chocolate products. Opened in 2011 as a premium supermarket brand in the Golden Valley shopping center. The second outlet opened in 2013 at the FMI Center Parkson.

=== City Baby Clubs ===
City Baby Clubs sell daily essentials, accessories, toys and food products for mothers and baby care. The Baby Club has expanded to 6 outlets in Yangon and Mandalay.

=== City Care ===
City Care pharmacies provide pharmaceutical products, beauty and health products. There are 35 City Care stores in Yangon, Mandalay, Naypyidaw, Monywar, Mawlamyaing and Pathein.

=== City Books & Music ===
Local bookstore and music chain providing Myanmar-focused books and magazines as well as original music of both local and international musicians. There are 13 City Books & Music outlets.

=== Seasons Bakery ===
Seasons Bakery provides freshly baked goods. Seasons outlets have expanded to 34 outlets.

=== City Express ===
A convenience store chain opened 24-hours that currently operates 52 outlets in Yangon. City Express started as a mini-shop outlet and opened in April 2011 on Hledan Road in Yangon. Rebranded as City Express in 2013.

=== City Mall Online ===
CMHL decided to step up into the E-Commerce sector and launch the beta version of City Mall Online in April 2017. Then City Mall Online was upgraded into a new platform in January 2018 and is currently using that version to serve their customers.

== CSR activities ==
The company started the City Love & Hope Foundation in 2013 to provide support in the following areas to the communities:

- Education
- Health
- Environment
- Community Livelihood
