= Maha Bandula Road =

Road in Yangon, Myanmar

Coordinates: 16.774676°N 96.154341°E

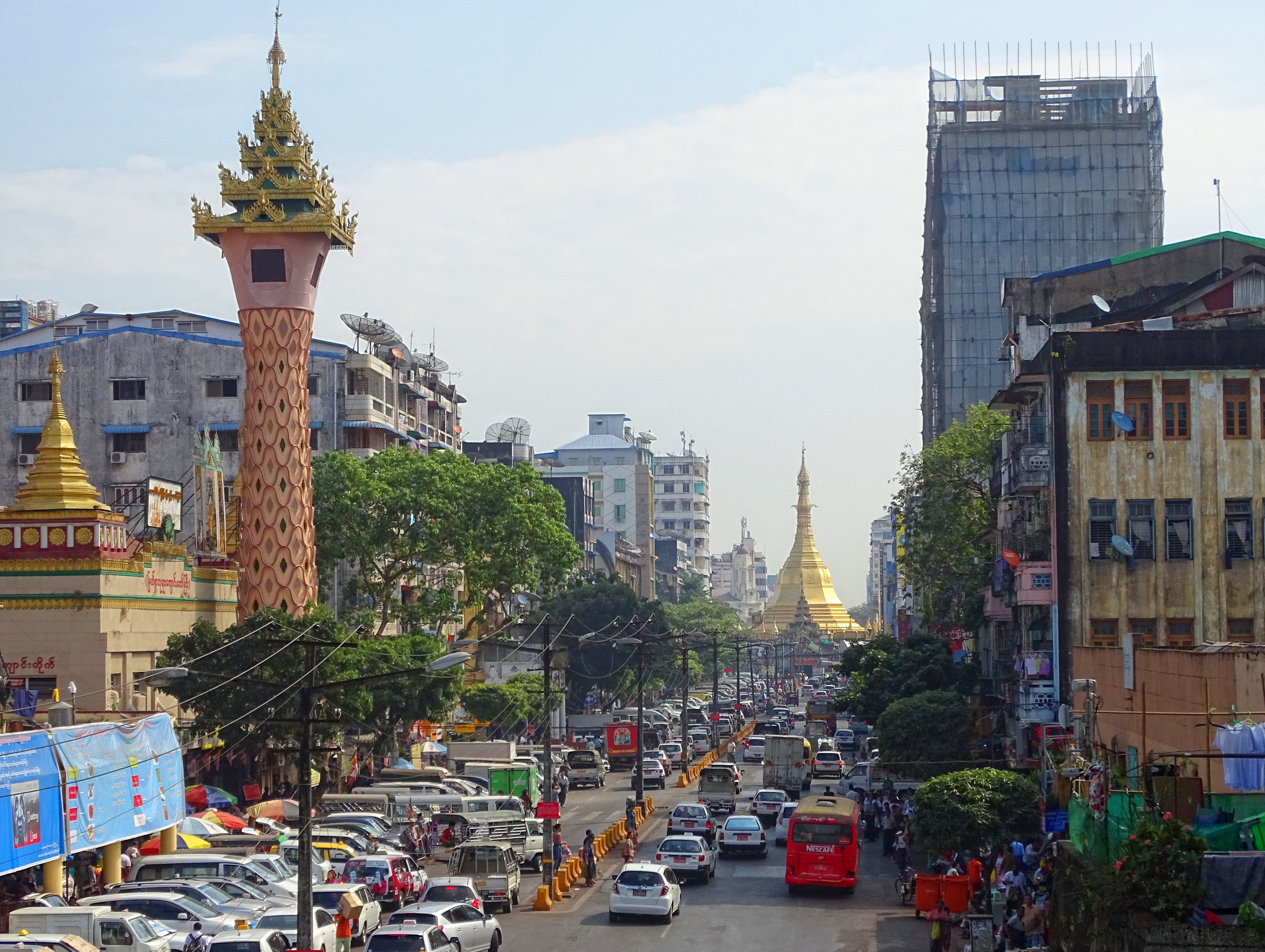
Maha Bandula Road

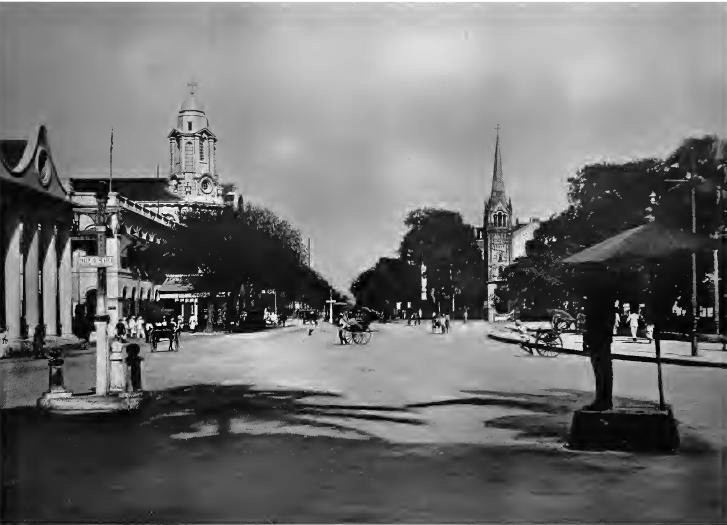
Dalhousie Road in 1890s in front of City Hall

Maha Bandula Road (Burmese: မဟာဗန္ဓုလလမ်း, formerly Dalhousie Road) is a major road of southern Yangon, Burma. It is named in honor of Burmese general Maha Bandula. It crosses the city in a west–east direction and runs parallel to Bogyoke Aung San Road. It runs past Maha Bandula Park and eventually to Maha Bandula Bridge.

Guanyin Gumiao Temple, one of two major Chinese temples within Latha Township in Yangon's Chinatown, is located on Maha Bandula Road.
