= Pazundaung Township =

Pazundaung Township ပုဇွန်တောင် မြို့နယ်
- Township of Yangon
- Pazundaung Township
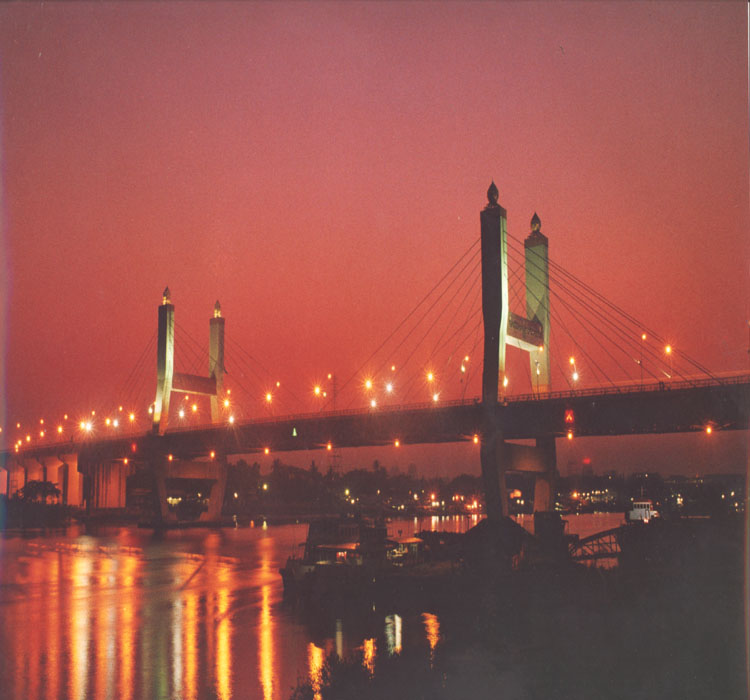
- Maha Bandula Bridge

- Location within Myanmar
- Coordinates: 16°47′0″N 96°10′0″E
- Country: Myanmar
- Region: Yangon Region
- City: Yangon
- District: Botataung District

Area
  - Total: 1.01 km^{2} (0.391 sq mi)

Population (2000)
  - Total: 31,000
  - Density: 31,000/km^{2} (79,000/sq mi)
- Time zone: UTC6:30 (MST)
- Postal codes: 11171
- Area codes: 1, (mobile: 80, 99)

Pazundaung Township (Burmese: ပုဇွန်တောင် မြို့နယ် [bəzʊ̀ɰ̃dàʊɰ̃ mjo̰nɛ̀]) is a township located in the southeastern part of Yangon, Myanmar. The township consists of ten wards, and shares borders with Botataung Township in the west and the south, Mingala Taungnyunt Township in the northwest, Thaketa Township in the north and the Pazundaung Creek in the east. Pazundaung is connected to Dawbon Township across the Maha Bandula Bridge. The township has nine primary schools, three middle schools and four high schools as well as a hospital. Pazundaung Market and Yegyaw Market are the main shopping bazaars of the area.

== Etymology ==
The Burmese placename Pazundaung is of Mon origin; the original Mon placename Pasonde (မသုန်ဒဵု) literally translates as "five hills," consisting of Pudaw, Ma-u, Mahlwa, Peinne, and Nyaung hills.

== History ==
After Alaungpaya annexed Dagon (now modern-day Yangon) in 1755, he appointed Thiri Ye Hla Kyawhtin to administer the village of Pazundaung. In 1757, Thiri Ye Hla Kyawhtin and the mayor of Yangon jointly renovated the Dhamma Wilatha temple in Pazundaung.

Following the annexation of Lower Burma after the First and Second Anglo-Burmese Wars, Pazundaung continued to be administered as a village. Kinwun Mingyi U Kaung documented his travels in Pazundaung after making a pilgrimage to Shwedagon Pagoda in 1874.

== Population ==
Pazundaung Township has 48,455 residents as of 2014, with 54.3% females and 45.7% male residents.

== Landmarks ==
Pazundaung township was the easternmost part of the original city plan laid out by the British. Some of the buildings and structures of "architectural significance" are now designated landmarks by the Yangon City Development Committee.

Structure	Type	Address	Notes
Maha Vishnu Temple	Hindu Temple	137-139 51st Street	
Methodist Church	Church	256 Bo Myat Tun Road	
Shwebonpwint Pagoda	Pagoda	U Shwe Gone Street	
Barmala Sunni Muslim Jama Mosque	Mosque	69-73 Anawrahta Road	

== In popular culture ==
Pazundaung features in "Shwebo Thanakha" (ရွှေဘိုသနပ်ခါး), a popular traditional Burmese song written by Nandawshae Saya Tin.
