= Maha Bandula Bridge =

Coordinates: 16°46′36″N 96°10′59″E

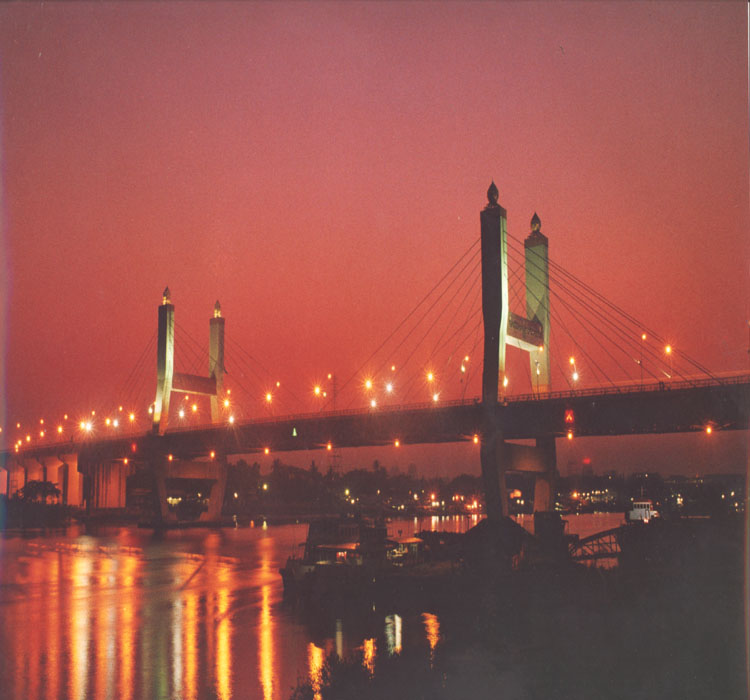
Maha Bandula Bridge at night

Maha Bandula Bridge (sometimes spelled Mahabandoola Bridge) is a major bridge in Yangon, Myanmar, built by Myat Bhone Khat. It is named after Burmese general Maha Bandula, and crosses Pazundaung Creek just east of Yangon's central business district. The cable-stayed bridge utilizes a three-span, semi-fan system and can be accessed by Maha Bandula Road.
