= Konthe Road =

Road in Yangon, Myanmar

Coordinates: 16°46′17.6″N 96°10′6.9″E

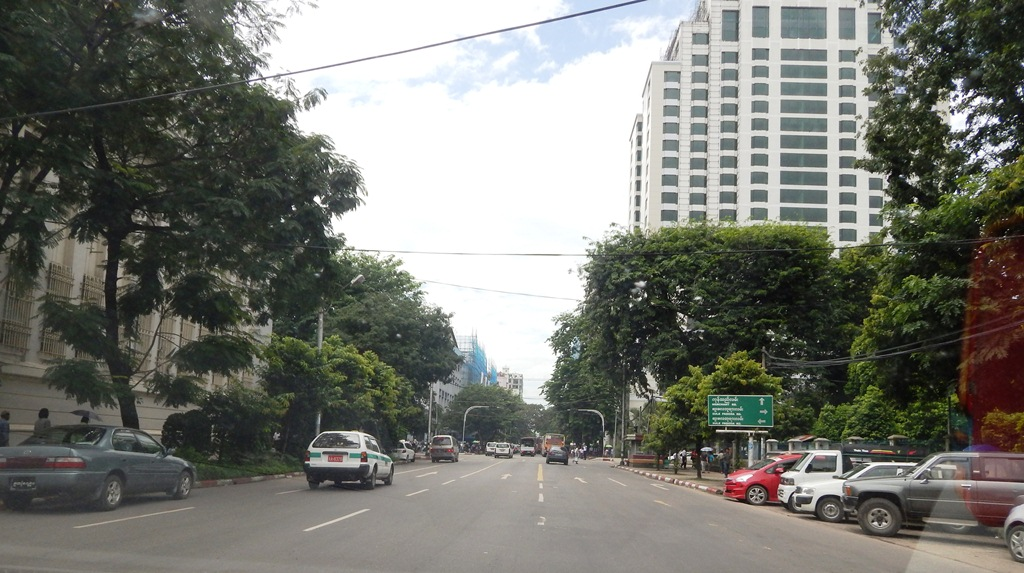
Konthe Road in 2013

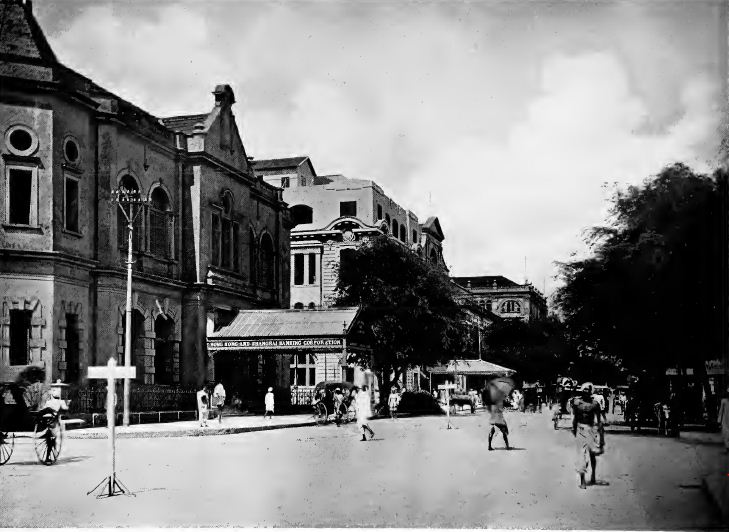
Merchant Road in 1890s

Konthe Road (Burmese: ကုန်သည်လမ်း, formerly Merchant Road or Merchat Street) is an east–west road in downtown Yangon, Myanmar. It runs past Maha Bandula Park. It is one of the key arteries of Yangon's Central Business District, and offers glimpses of Myanmar’s political, commercial, and architectural transition from the colonial era to the present day.
