= Maha Bandula Park =

Park in Yangon, Myanmar

- မဟာဗန္ဓုလ ပန်းခြံ
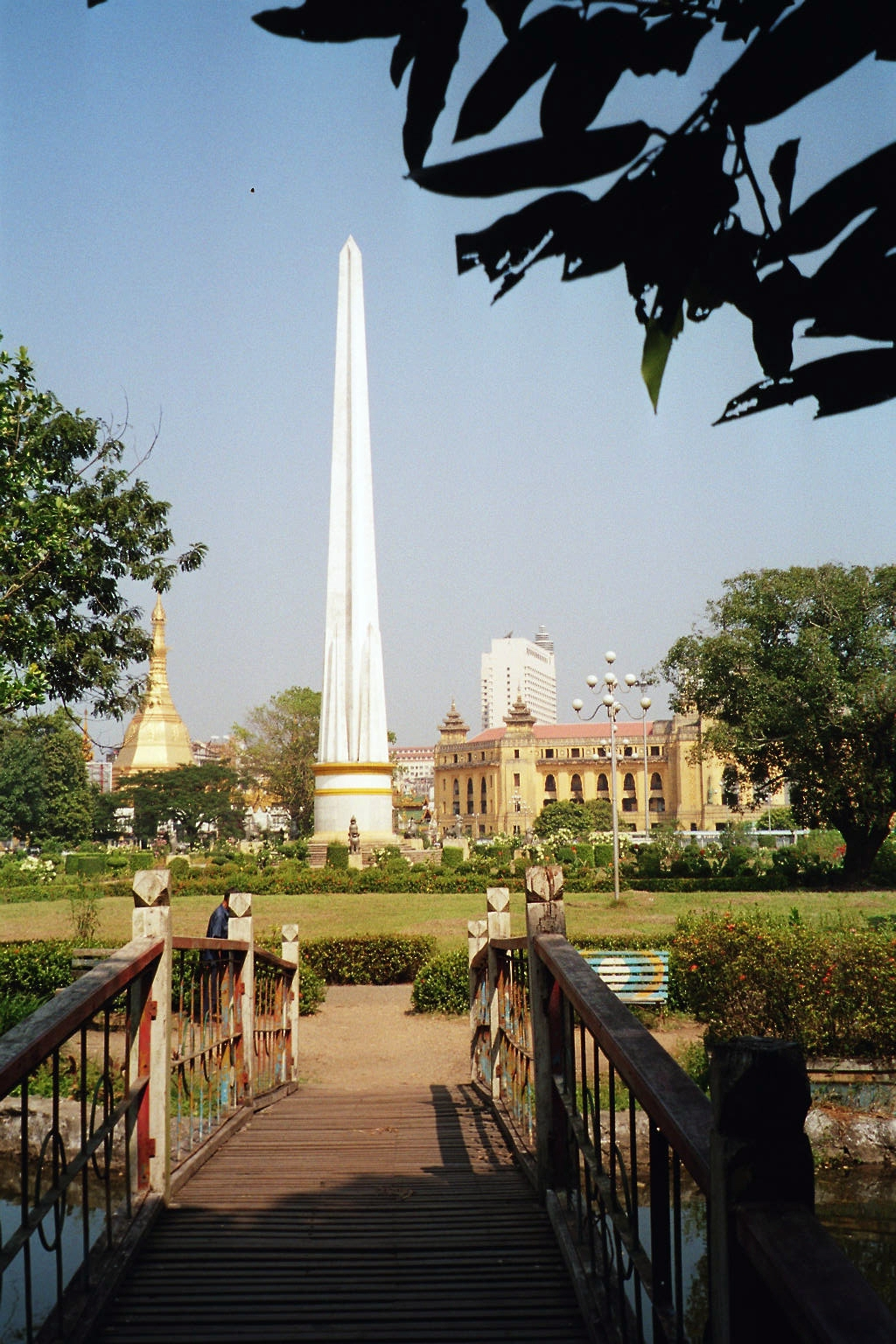
- The Independence Monument in Maha Bandula Park
- Interactive map of Maha Bandula Park
- Type: Urban park
- Location: Yangon
- Coordinates: 16°46′22.88″N 96°09′34.27″E
- Area: 7.5 acres (3.0 ha)
- Created: 1867-1868
- Operator: Yangon City Development Committee
- Status: Open all year

The Maha Bandula Park or Maha Bandula Garden (Burmese: မဟာဗန္ဓုလ ပန်းခြံ, pronounced [məhà bàɰ̃dṵla̰ páɰ̃dʑàɰ̃], also spelled Mahabandula or Mahabandoola) is a public park located in downtown Yangon, Burma. The park is bounded by Maha Bandula Garden Street in the east, Sule Pagoda Road in the west, Konthe Road in the south and Maha Bandula Road in the north. It is surrounded by several important buildings, such as the Sule Pagoda, the Yangon City Hall and the High Court. The park is named after General Maha Bandula who fought against the British in the First Anglo-Burmese War (1824–1826).

== History ==
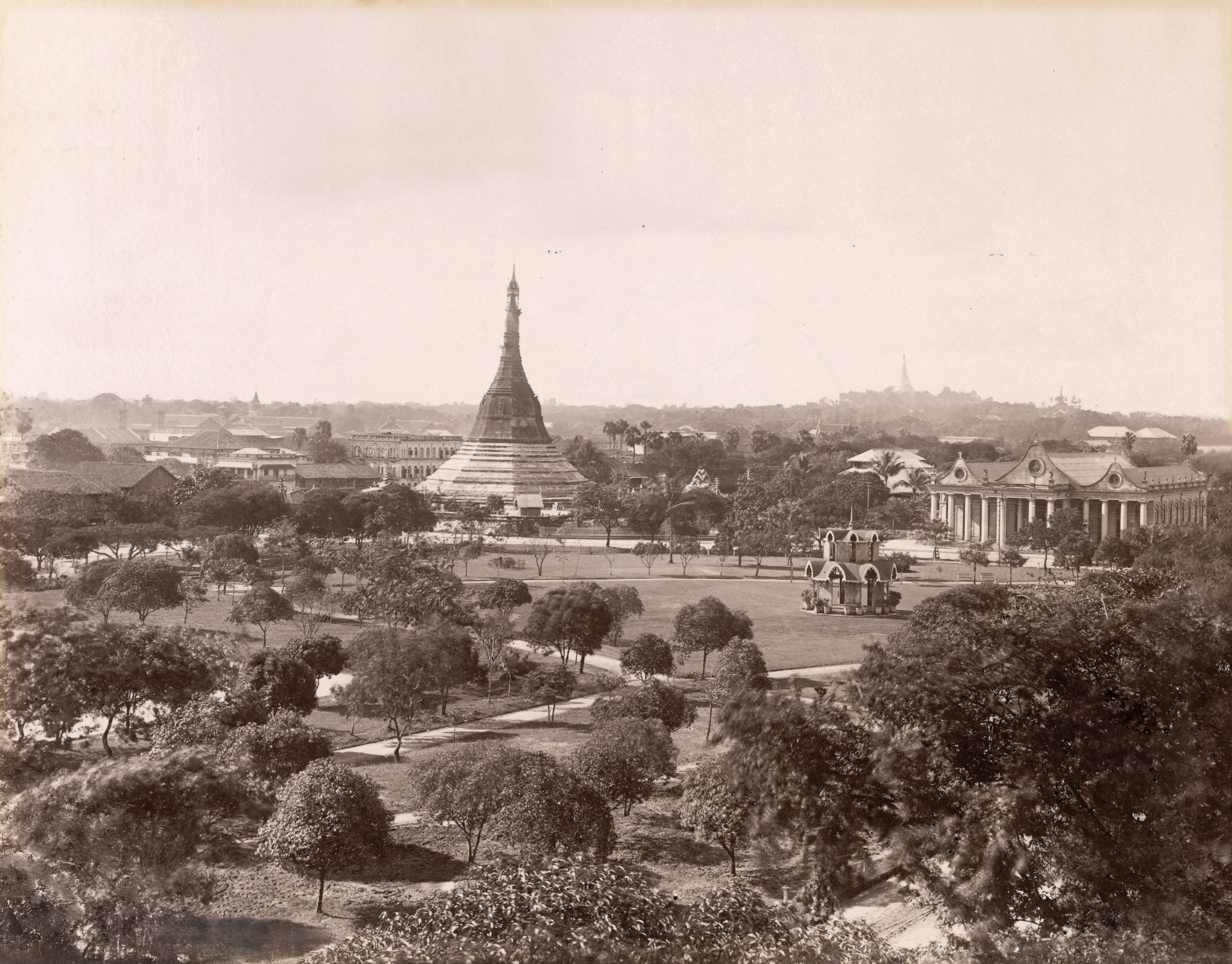
A view of Fytche Square circa 1895, facing toward Sule Pagoda.

The park dates to 1867 to 1868, founded as Fytche Square in honour of the then Chief Commissioner of British Burma, Albert Fytche. The land was previously a vacant, swampy site originally known as Tank Square, which was cleared and laid out as a public recreation ground. A white marble statue of Queen Victoria was placed in the center of the park in 1896, gifted by a wealthy Armenian firm in Rangoon. After 1935, the park was renamed Bandula Square, reflecting rising nationalist sentiment.

After 1948, the Independence Monument, an obelisk in commemoration of Burmese independence from the British in 1948, was installed at the center of the park, replacing the statue of Queen Victoria, which was taken back to England after Myanmar's Independence. The architect of this Independence monument was Sithu U Tin, who was also the architect for the City Hall. The park was remodeled in 2012.
