= Kyauktada District =

District in Yangon, Myanmar

Kyauktada District ကျောက်တံတားခရိုင်
- District
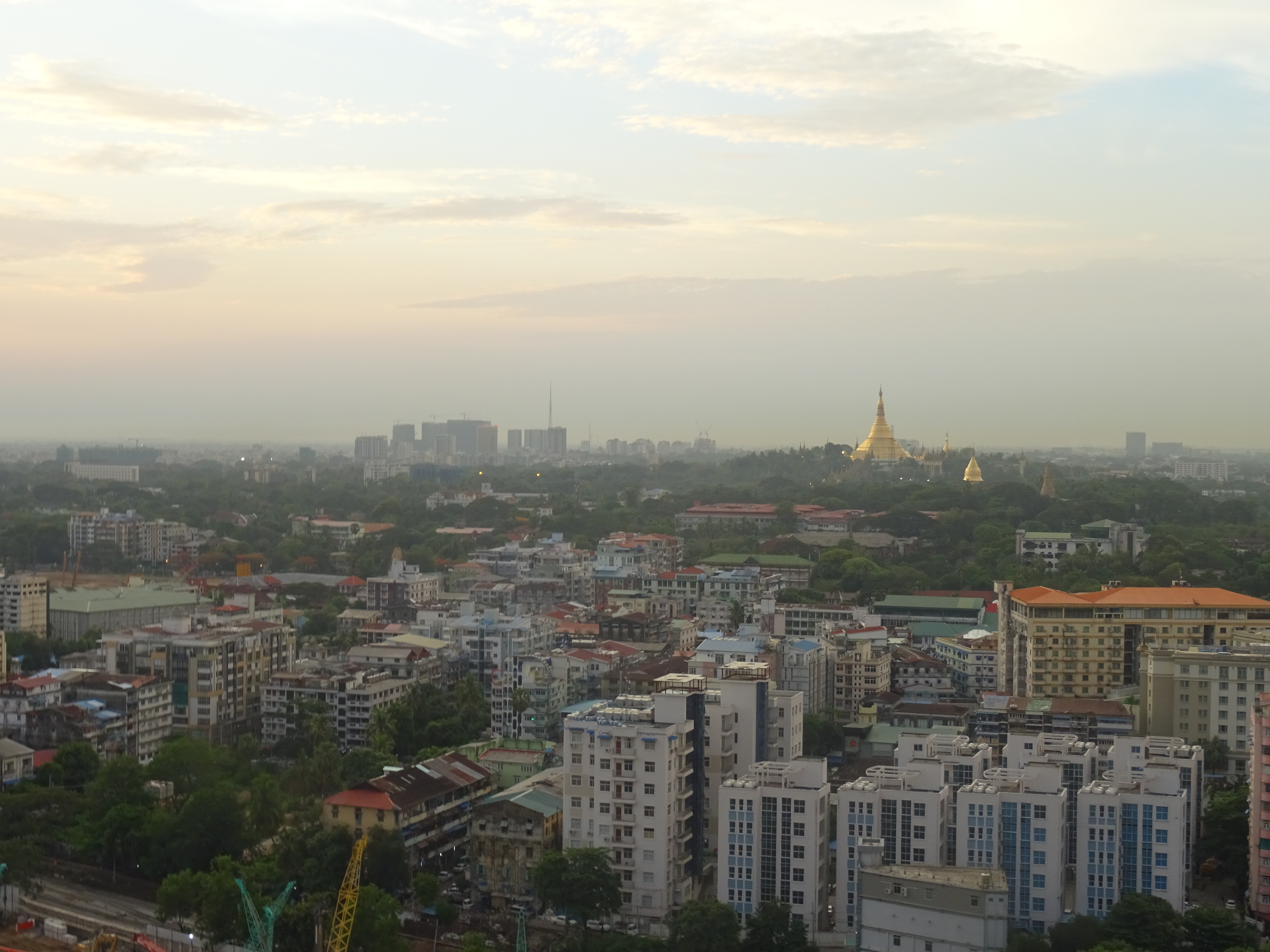
- View of Shwedagon Pagoda from Kyauktada Township

- Kyauktada District in Yangon Region
- Coordinates: 16.984°N 96.116°E
- Country: Myanmar
- Region: Yangon Region
- City: Yangon
- Area code: +951

Kyauktada District (Burmese: ကျောက်တံတားခရိုင်) is a district in Yangon Region, Myanmar. It is a township of Yangon and contains five townships forming the core of Yangon's downtown. The district was created in 2022, being one of the new districts created from the former West Yangon District. The administrative seat of the Yangon City Development Committee, and thereby Yangon city is located in Kyauktada Township in the district's east.

== Administration ==
The district has five townships- Dagon Township, Lanmadaw Township, Latha Township, Pabedan Township and Kyauktada Township.

The district contains the main government buildings of Yangon Region. Dagon is home to some of the most prominent places of the city, including the Yangon Region Hluttaw, the regional parliament. Yangon City Hall, the seat of the city's administrative body, Yangon City Development Committee (YCDC) is located in Kyauktada Township. The city hall has been the focal point of several major political demonstrations, including a 1964 People's Peace Committee rally supported by Thakin Kodaw Hmaing, which attracted 200,000 people and was subsequently clamped down by Ne Win's military junta.

== Notable sites ==
Lanmadaw and Latha form the Yangon Chinatown and are also home to several heritage building sites including the BEHS 1 Lanmadaw, the Yangon Central Women's Hospital, three historic Chinese temples, a cathedral and many other religious sites. Various embassies, such as the embassies of the United Kingdom and of India, are located in the district.

Both the Shwedagon Pagoda and Sule Pagoda are located within the district. In addition to the Shwedagon, Dagon Township is home to the Maha Wizaya Pagoda, the National Museum and the Yangon National Theatre.

== See also ==
- List of districts and neighborhoods of Yangon
