= Basic Education High School No. 1 Dagon =

- အခြေခံ ပညာ အထက်တန်း ကျောင်း အမှတ် (၁) ဒဂုံ

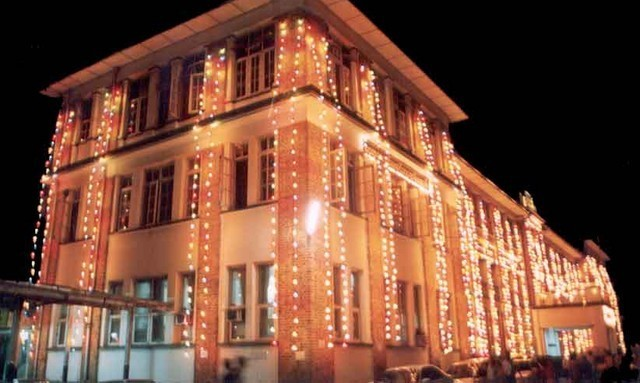

Location
- 57 Alanpya Pagoda Road; Dagon 11191; Yangon, Yangon Region; Myanmar

Information
- Type: Public
- Mottoes: Do we learn not for school but for life
- Established: 1882
- School number: 1
- Principal: Dr Sandar Mya Nyein
- Faculty: 150
- Grades: KG to 12
- Enrollment: 6500

Designations

Yangon City Landmark

Basic Education High School No. 1 Dagon (Burmese: အခြေခံ ပညာ အထက်တန်း ကျောင်း အမှတ် (၁) ဒဂုံ; formerly, Methodist English High School; commonly known as ဒဂုံ ၁ ), located a few miles north of downtown Yangon is considered one of the best public high schools in Myanmar. Dagon 1 offers classes from KG to Grade 12 to about 6500 students.

Attended by children from wealthy families, Dagon 1 offers some of the top educational facilities available in a Burmese private school. The school sends a number of students to the country's selective universities each year. Its famous alumna is the Nobel Peace Prize Laureate Aung San Suu Kyi. Many of the Burmese entertainment industry's top stars are Dagon 1 alumni. In recent years, it has lost some of its appeal as a top school as ultra-wealthy parents now send their children to expensive English language medium "international" private schools.

The school's main colonial era building is on the Yangon City Heritage List.

== History ==
Music Festival of Dagon1 in 2004

The school was founded in 1882 as Methodist Episcopal Girls School on Lewis Street (now Seikkantha Street). In 1894, the school was moved to its current campus on the corner of Lancaster Road (now Nawaday Road) and Signal Pagoda Road, and was also renamed Methodist English Girls High School. The school consisted primarily of a three-story Victorian-era style building 213 feet (65 m) long and 145 feet (44 m) wide. At first, boys were accepted only in the elementary level (from K to 3). During the interwar period, boys were allowed from K to 4. Just before World War II, the school had 55 students. The school was closed down for 6 years after World War II and later reopened in May, 1947. The principal, Mrs. Logie, repaired the school buildings that were destroyed during the war. At that time, the school began to prepare its students not only for the matriculation exam but also for the GCE (General Certificate of Education) exam from the University of London.

In 1951, the number of students increased to 850 and the four-story Kindergarten building (113'×51') with 15 rooms was built in 1952 to accommodate the students. The school's name was Methodist English High School (MEHS). On 14 April 1965, the institution was nationalized and became a public school and has been operated by the government ever since. In 1986, a new three-story building (90'×34') was built to correspond to the increased number of students. The school is currently running under the Department of Basic Education which is directly controlled by the Ministry of Education.

During 1988 democracy uprising, Dagon1 was one of the first high schools in Burma to form student union and participate in the protest boycott marches. Throughout the uprising, members of Dagon1 student union lead their fellow students and teachers in various protest marches. Dagon1 protest column can be clearly distinguished amongst other columns by their Green Flag with White Fighting Peacock emblem, former official flag of All Burma Federation of Student Unions and the green and white represents the uniform colours of high school students. After September 1988 coup by the military, some of dagon1 students went to Thai-Burma border and joined All Burma Student Democratic Front (ABSDF) to achieve democracy and human rights in Burma through armed struggle.

== Student body ==
Dagon 1 has the largest student body in Yangon and in Myanmar, numbering near 6,600. A high student-to-teacher ratio exists, like most of the schools in Myanmar. The students are spread across eleven standards or grades, from Grade 1 (formerly Kindergarten) to Grade 11 (formerly Tenth Standard). Because an increasing demand for enrollment at the school, Dagon 1's student body is in the shape of a pyramid, with the number of younger students outnumbering that of older students. New classes are formed to handle the increased enrollment each year.

== Uniform ==
Like all public schools in Myanmar, Dagon-1 requires that students wear the school uniform at all times. There are two sets of uniform, one for wear from Kindergarten to 5th Standard (Grades 1 to 6), and another, more traditional one for wear from the 6th Standard to 10th Standard (Grades 7 to 11). But all uniforms are of the same colour - a white shirt or blouse, with a green garment for the torso.

=== School badge ===
A circular badge, bearing an oil lamp (representing wisdom and education), with a circular cogwheel and a rice plant together with the school's name. Inside the cogwheel, there are 5 coloured sections: Orange, Yellow, Green, Red and Blue representing the school council team colors.

=== Boys uniform ===
- From Grade 1 to the Grade 5, male students are required to wear a white shirt (with or without the collar), tucked into a green long pants. Tee shirts and sports shirts are not acceptable. Shoes and the traditional slipper, Hnyat-phanat are permitted as footwear.
- From the Grade 6 onwards, the students have to wear a white shirt (with or without the collar), and a green paso. Only the Hnyat-phanat is permitted. Traditional Mandalay slippers, usually of velvet or other materials, are worn.

=== Girls uniform ===
- Girls have to wear a white bow hair-clip on their heads.
- From Grade 1 to Grade 5, girls can wear either skirts or pants, with a white shirt. Girls usually wear slippers.
- For Grade 6 onwards, the uniform also becomes more traditional like its male counterpart. The girl must wear only the side opening (yin-phone) traditional Burmese blouse, with the Htamein as the lower garment.

== Accomplishments ==
In 2011, the top nine scorers of the 2011 Matriculation Exam came from Dagon 1. In 2015, the four of the top 10 scorers in the 2015 Matriculation Exam came from Dagon 1.
