= Kaba Aye Pagoda =

Buddhist pagoda in Yangon, Myanmar

- ကမ္ဘာအေးစေတီ
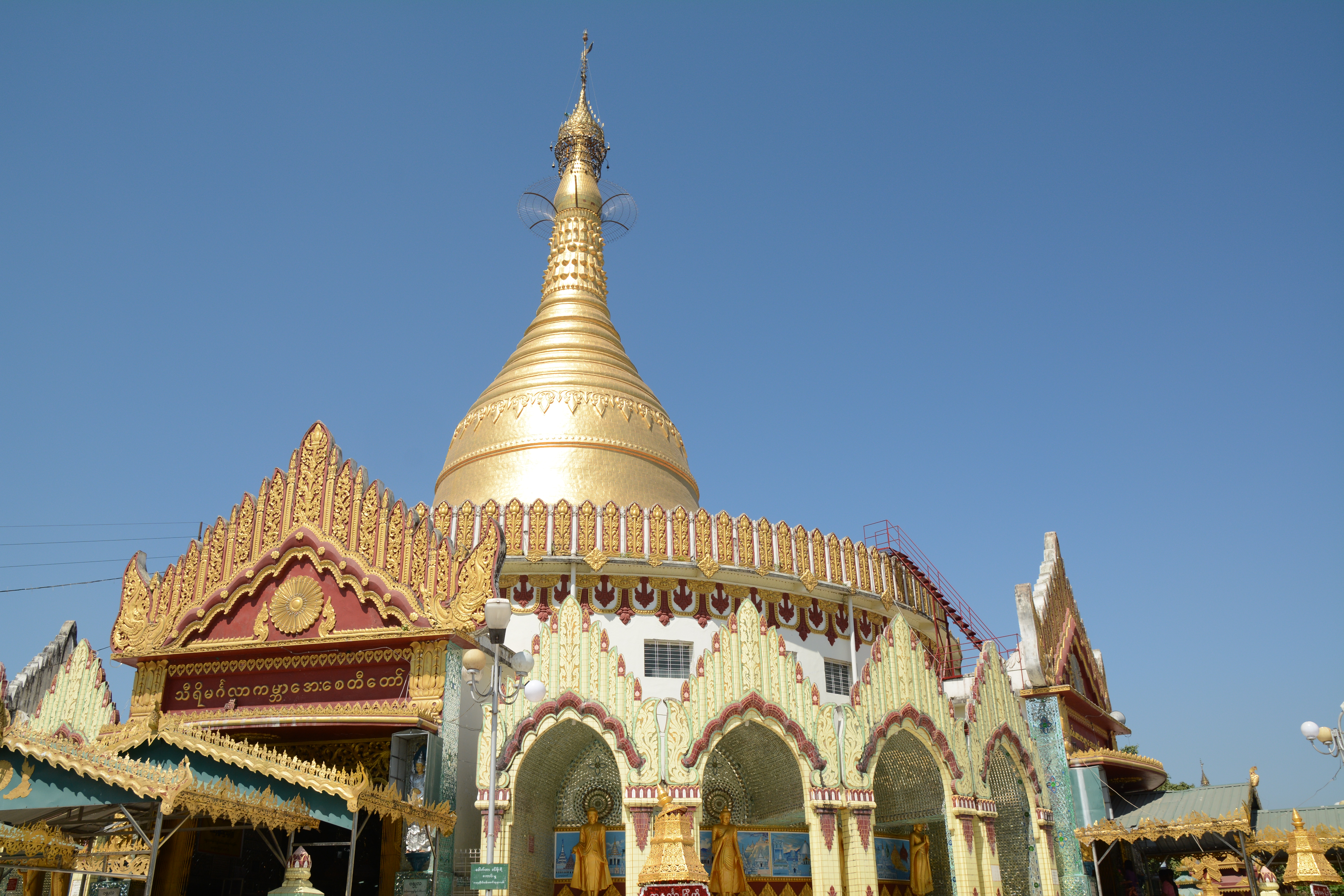

- Location within Myanmar

Religion
- Affiliation: Theravada Buddhism

Location
- Location: Yangon
- Country: Myanmar
- Coordinates: 16.856831°N 96.154481°E

Architecture
- Founder: U Nu
- Completed: 1952; 74 years ago

Designations

Yangon City Landmark

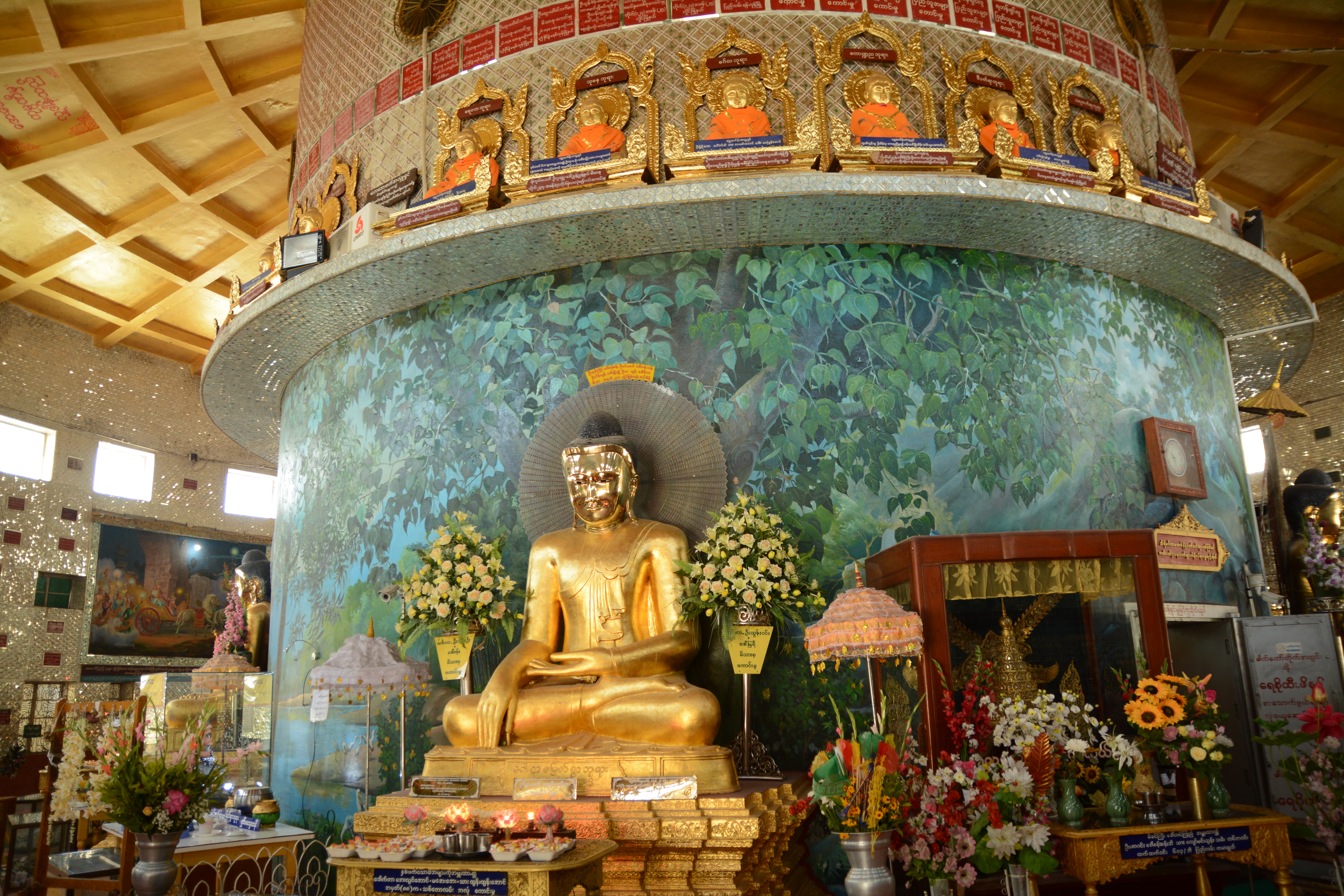
Interior

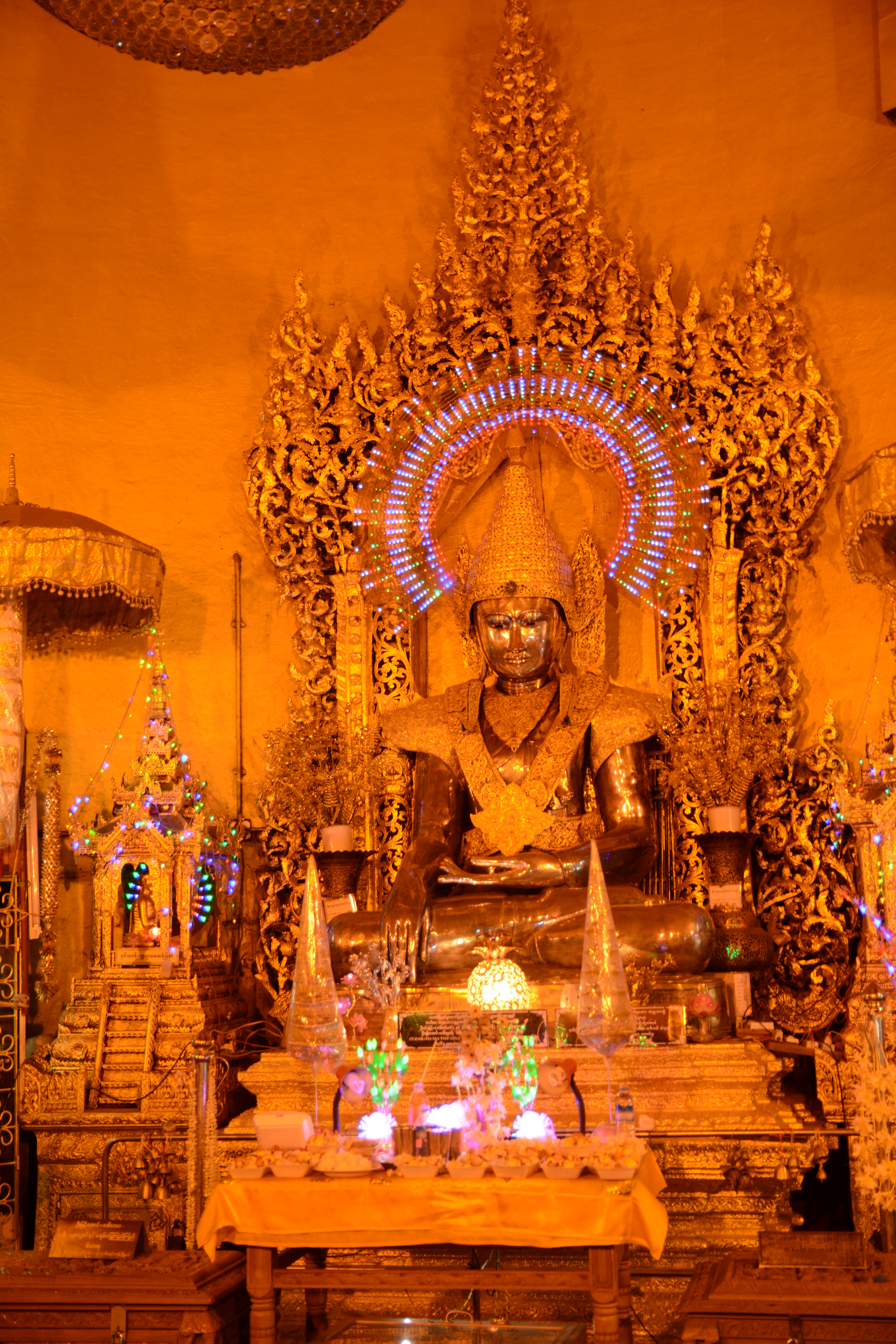
Interior

Kaba Aye Pagoda (Burmese: ကမ္ဘာအေးစေတီ; pronounced [ɡəbàʔézèdì]; also spelt Gaba Aye Pagoda; lit. World Peace Pagoda), formally Thiri Mingala Gaba Aye Zedidaw (သီရိမင်္ဂလာကမ္ဘာအေးစေတီတော်), is a Buddhist pagoda located on Kaba Aye Road, Mayangon Township, Yangon, Myanmar. The pagoda was built in 1952 by U Nu in preparation for the Sixth Buddhist Council that he held from 1954 to 1956. The pagoda measures 111 feet (34 m) high and is also 111 feet (34 m) around the base. The pagoda is located approximately 11 km north of Yangon, a little past the Inya Lake Hotel. The Maha Pasana Guha (great cave) was built simultaneously with the Kaba Aye Pagoda and is located in the same complex. The cave is a replica of the Satta Panni cave, located in India, where the First Buddhist Synod was convened. The six entrances of the Maha Pasana Cave symbolize the Sixth Great Synod. The cave is 455 feet (139 m) long and 370 feet (110 m) wide. Inside, the assembly hall is 220 feet (67 m) long and 140 feet (43 m) wide.

== Background ==
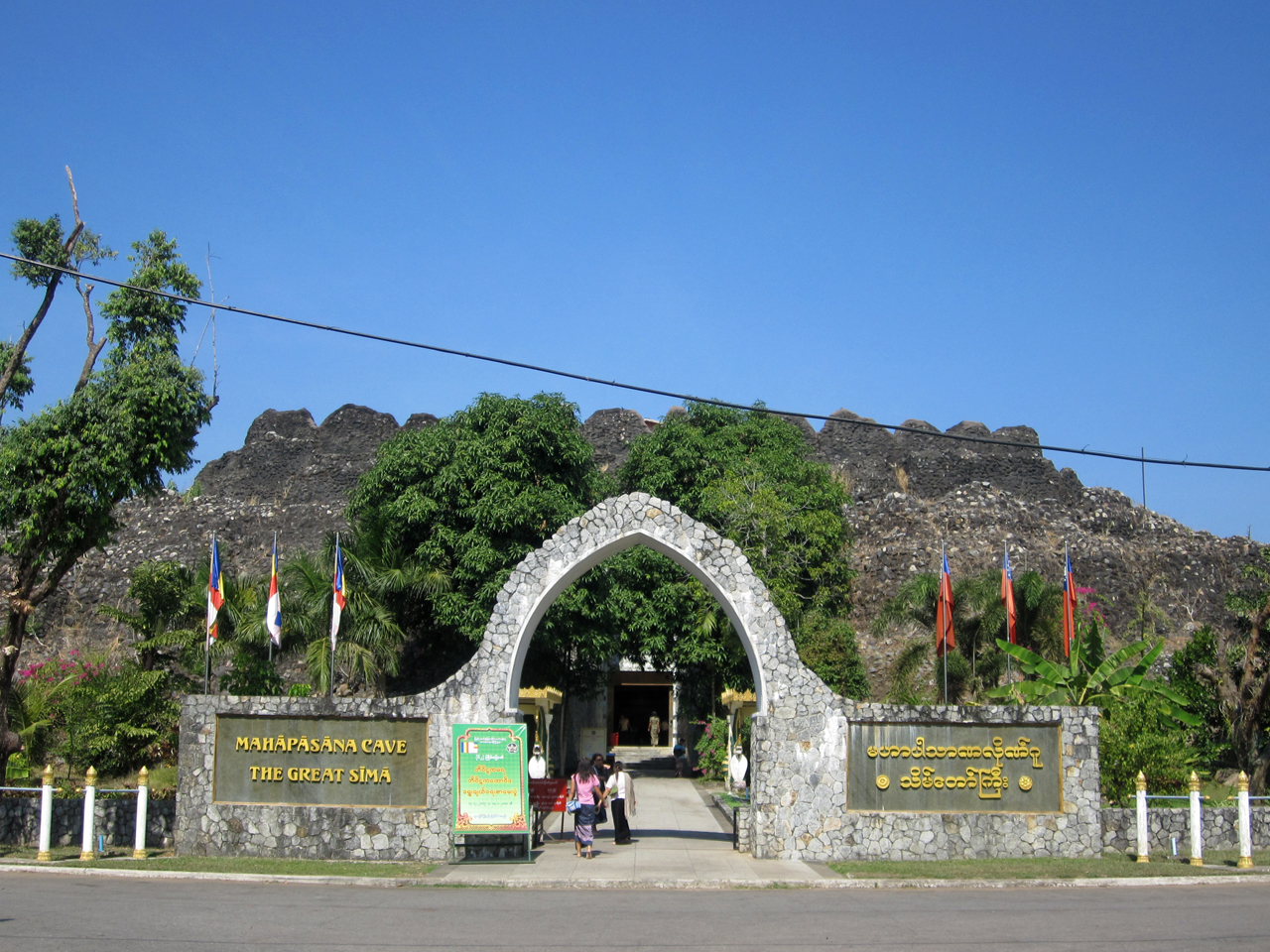
Mahapasana Guha Cave and Ordination Hall is adjacent to the Kaba Aye Pagoda.

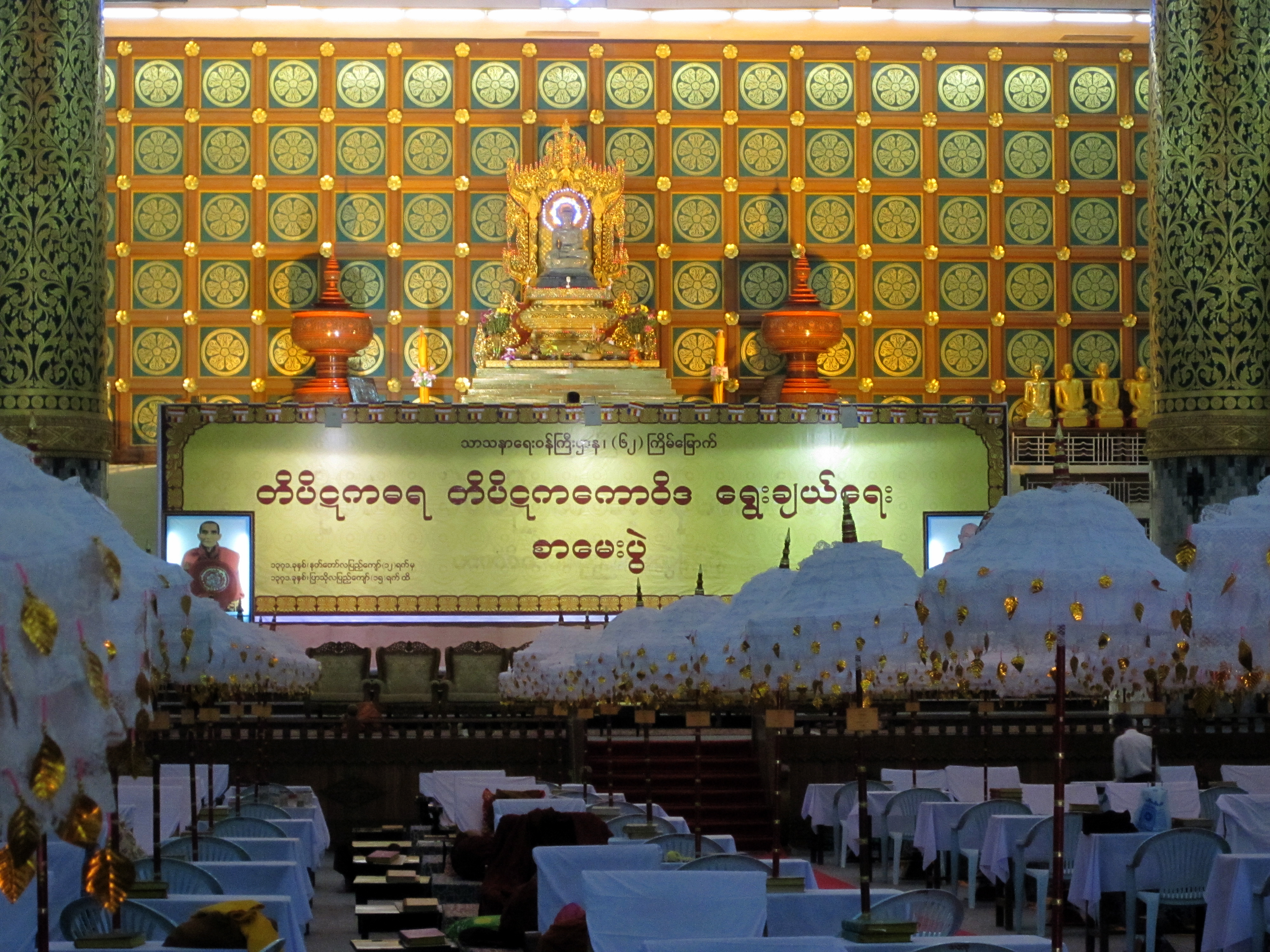
Mahapasana Guha Cave also hosts religious examination called the Tipitakadhara Tipitaka Kovida Examinations, an extensive recitation, oral and written examination on the Tipitaka, the religious body of works in Theravada Buddhism.

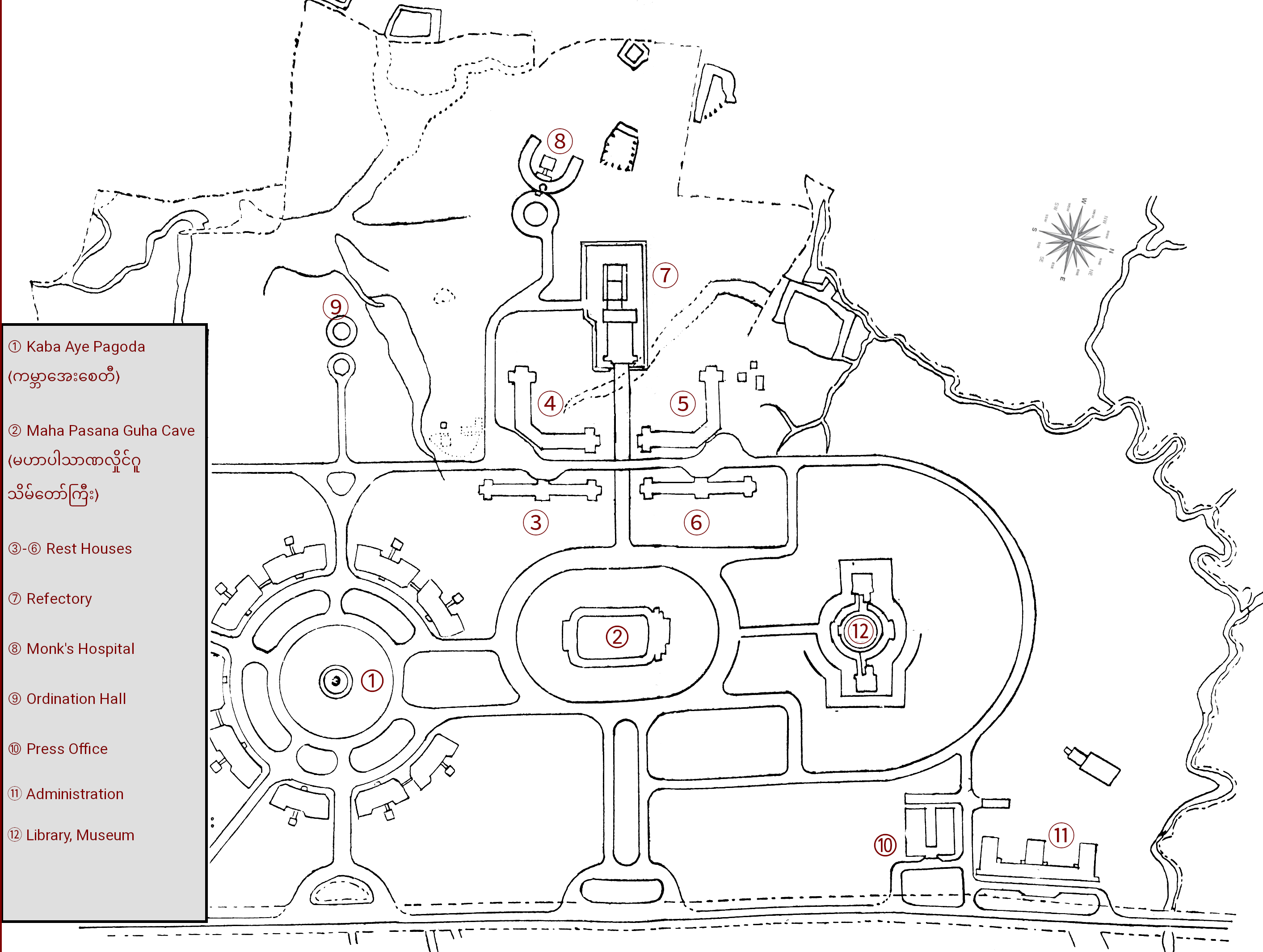
Area at the time of the 6th Buddhist council, 1954–6.

As prime minister of Burma, U Nu built the Kaba Aye Pagoda and the Maha Pasana Guha Cave (မဟာပါသာဏလှိုင်ဂူသိမ်တော်ကြီး) in 1952 in preparation for the Sixth Buddhist Synod that he convened and hosted and which lasted two years, from 1954 to 1956. This Synod coincided with the 2500-year anniversary of Buddha's enlightenment. In Burma, the kings traditionally built a pagoda in their honor to stand as a relic of their rule. For example, Ne Win built the Maha Wizaya Pagoda in his honor. The construction of the pagoda and cave were a part of U Nu's attempt to establish Buddhism as the official religion of Burma, thereby creating a Buddhist state.

The Kaba Aye pagoda is open daily from 6 am to 8 pm, with an admission fee of $5. In addition to the Burmese who make religious pilgrimages, the pagoda attracts domestic as well as foreign tourists. The Kaba Aye Pagoda compound is large and is intended to be peaceful and quiet for the tourists, monks and devotees who visit.

The circular platform surrounding the main pagoda is enclosed in the style of a cave-temple. There are five porches decorated with colorful arched pediments. Lotus flowers, lotus buds and swastikas are carved in stucco around the outside. The main pagoda is 117 feet 6 inches high, with smaller pagodas on the five porches each 8 feet (2.4 m) high. Vendors sell handmade products on the entrances to the pagoda. The pagoda, which is hollow, has a middle point inside which features four great Buddhas (four great pillars) in commemoration of the four Buddhas who have already appeared in the world. A room inside the pagoda houses Buddha relics, including a large silver statue of Buddha, over eight feet tall. There is also a room inside the pagoda, which is used to keep Buddha relics.

The Maha Pasana Cave, which translates to "great cave of stone," is located to the north of the Kaba Aye pagoda. The cave is a replica to the cave by the same name in India, where the first Buddhist Synod or Great Council was held just some months after the Buddha underwent Parinirvana. During the sixth Buddhist Synod in 1954, 2500 monks converged on the cave to recite the words of the Buddha in Pali, the entire Tipitaka. The monks recited, edited, and approved all of the Buddhist scriptures, known as the Three Pitakat.

== Political significance ==
U Nu was the first Prime Minister of Burma after the 1947 Constitution of the Union of Burma was passed. He was a pious Buddhist and tried his best to establish Burma as a Buddhist country. On August 29, 1961, the Parliament announced that Buddhism was the official state religion, mainly due to U Nu's efforts. Cow slaughtering was officially banned in Burma. However, in 1962 Ne Win, who succeeded U Nu, repealed this measure and the effort to make Burma a Buddhist country was eventually halted. The construction of the Kaba Aye complex was part of U Nu's attempt to institutionalize Buddhism at the national level.

The Kaba Aye complex also underscores the failure of U Nu to standardize and institutionalize Buddhism. There are some minorities in Burma such as the Kachins and Karens who felt alienated by this effort to make Buddhism a state religion. Furthermore, Buddhists did not believe that Buddhism should be a part of a political institution. They wanted Burma to be a moral society but did not wish their religion to be imposed on the citizens. The monks who want religion to be a social practice that is separate from the state do not associate with these pagodas. Therefore, the pagodas such as the Kaba Aye are not affiliated with any monasteries. The fear is that if these monks become associated to a pagoda, which was built by the state and is run by the state, they will lose their autonomy.

== Significance and Origin of Pagodas in Burma ==
The most sacred pagoda in Burma is the Shwedagon Pagoda (Golden Pagoda). This pagoda towers at 321.5 feet (98.0 m) tall, is gilded in gold and is also located in Yangon. It, too, contains relics of the past four Buddhas inside of it. According to legend, the pagoda is 2500 years old. Burma is most famous to the western world because of the Shwedagon Pagoda. For the Burmese people, seeing foreign tourists visit the pagoda and looking at it in awe is a source of national pride.

In the 11th century, King Anawrahta invaded the Mon Kingdom of Thaton in what is currently part of southern Burma. Following the successful invasion he returned to Pagan with the Buddhist missionary monk Shin Arahan and the Buddhist scriptures he had brought with him from Ceylon. After establishing his Pagan Dynasty through numerous military campaigns, Anawrahta eventually converted and later established Theravada Buddhism as the state religion in 1056 and built many Buddhist pagodas. Some feel as though he built these pagodas in order to make up for the violent warfare by which he built his Pagan dynasty. Anawrahta implemented a tradition of pagoda building that has continued until the present. It was in keeping with this tradition that Ne Win also began building his Maha Wizaya Pagoda. Furthermore, the military regime that succeeded him built the Swedawmyat (tooth relic) Pagoda. Currently, hundreds of pagodas dot the Burmese landscape. Scholars suggest that besides King Anawrahta, many other kings or leaders built the pagodas not out of devotion to Buddhism, but rather as a form of repentance that they felt for carrying out multiple wars with various kingdoms in India and Thailand regions, in addition to other parts of what is currently Burma.

== 1996 bombings ==
On December 25, 1996, two bombs exploded at the Kaba Aye Pagoda and Maha Pasana Cave, killing five people and wounding 17. The initial explosion took place at the Kaba Aye Pagoda at 8:20 pm, but nobody was injured because pilgrims did not use that entrance. However, the second explosion, which detonated two hours later as authorities were looking into the other blast, went off inside the temple as it was filling with pilgrims, causing the fatalities and injuries. At the Kaba Aye compound Buddha's tooth relic was on display, and thus many more pilgrims were at the site than during normal times. The tooth relic, on loan from China and believed to be one of two surviving since the Buddha's death 2500 years ago, was not damaged in the bombing.

The explosion followed a crackdown on student protestors who were demanding more civil liberties. The SLORC (State Law and Order Restoration Council) accused the All-Burma Students Democratic Front (ABSDF) and the KNU (Karen National Union) of carrying out the bombing. Both groups denied the accusation. Aung Naing U, the foreign affairs liaison officer of the ABSDA, denied all involvement and added, "This is just an excuse by the SLORC to use force in suppressing the democratic forces. We learned that more security forces were placed at the site of the bombing; despite this measure, the explosions took place. Thus, it is assumed that it must be the work of the SLORC."

Even before the bombing at the Kaba Aye complex, the Burmese government had been accused of staging disturbances to justify crackdowns that would follow.

== See also ==
- Cetiya
- Burmese pagoda
- Shwedagon Pagoda
- Sule Pagoda
- Botataung Pagoda
- Maha Wizaya Pagoda
- Buddhism in Myanmar

== Literature ==
- Daulton, Jack. (1999). "Sariputta and Moggallana in the Golden Land: The Relics of the Buddha's Chief Disciples at the Kaba Aye Pagoda," Journal of Burma Studies 4 (1999), 101–128.
