= Dagon Township =

Dagon Township ဒဂုံ မြို့နယ်
- Township of Yangon
- Dagon Township
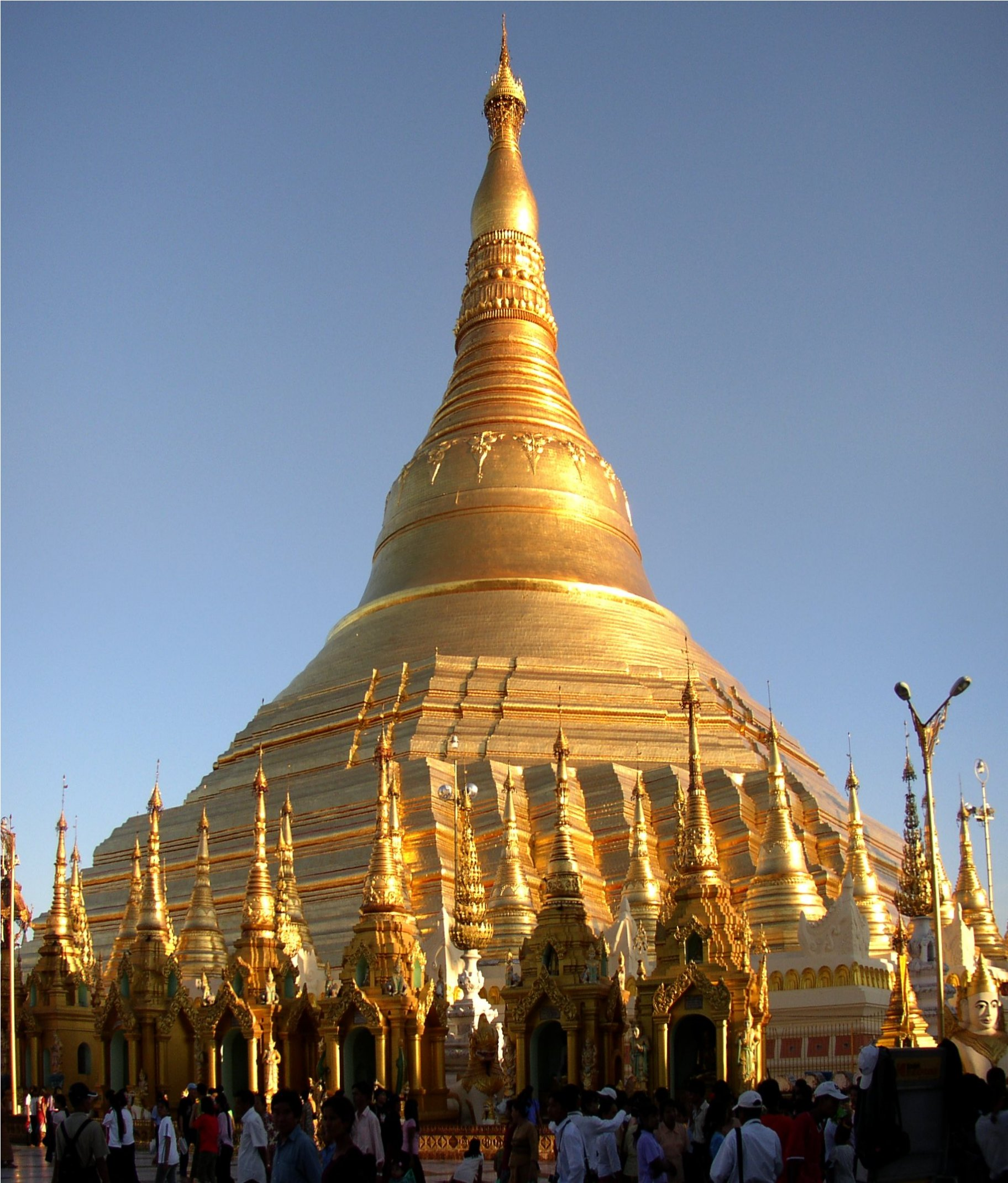
- Shwedagon Pagoda

- Location within Myanmar
- Coordinates: 16°46′51″N 96°8′59″E
- Country: Myanmar
- Region: Yangon Region
- City: Yangon
- District: Kyauktada District

Area
  - Total: 4.7 km^{2} (1.8 sq mi)

Population (2014)
  - Total: 25,082
  - Density: 5,300/km^{2} (14,000/sq mi)
- Time zone: UTC6:30 (MST)
- Postal codes: 11191
- Area codes: 1 (mobile: 80, 99)

Dagon Township (Burmese: ဒဂုံ မြို့နယ် [dəɡòʊɰ̃ mjo̰nɛ̀]) is located immediately north of downtown Yangon. The township comprises five wards, and shares borders with Bahan Township in the north, Ahlon Township in the west, Mingala Taungnyunt Township in the east, and Lanmadaw Township, Latha Township and Pabedan Township in the south.

Dagon is home to some of the city's most prominent places, including the great Shwedagon Pagoda, the Maha Wizaya Pagoda, the National Museum, the National Theatre and the Yangon Region Hluttaw (Parliament). This prosperous neighborhood has many hotels, embassies and diplomatic residences. The township's Dagon 1 High School and Dagon 2 High School are considered among the top public high schools in the country.

On 6 February 2011, the Taw Win Centre, a major shopping and residential complex, was opened in the township. Construction on the 25-story complex began in 2004, but was stopped during the country's banking crisis, before resuming in March 2008. The country's first 3D movie theater opened at the Taw Win Centre on 1 March 2012. In June 2011, the Sitagu Sayadaw opened the Yangon campus of the Sitagu International Buddhist Academy in Dagon Township.

== History ==
Dagon (Mon: လဂုင် [ləɡòʊɴ]) was a small fishing village founded by the Mon in the 6th century, CE, around the Shwedagon Pagoda. Throughout history, the village was just on the periphery of Thanlyin (Syriam), the commercial city across the Yangon River. Still, because of the pagoda, Dagon's cultural significance was far greater than its size. In 1755, King Alaungpaya captured the village, renamed it Yangon (most commonly translated as "End of Strife"), and founded a larger city by adding settlements such as Ahlon, Pabedan, Kyauktada, and Botataung.

During the British colonial period, Dagon was mostly a prosperous neighborhood, though the areas closer to downtown were full of squatters. Dagon boasted both the Methodist English High School, one of the top English-language medium schools and the nationalist Burmese language medium high school, Myoma High School.

In the 1950s, the Burmese government cleared the squatters in the southern part of the township and built the Minmanaing Housing Project for senior civil servants. In the 1980s, when Gen. Ne Win commissioned the Maha Wizaya Pagoda, Dagon gained another prominent pagoda. Dagon Town was designated a township in 1971.

== Demographics ==
=== 2014 ===
Historical population
Year	Pop.	±%
1973	35,746	—
1983	35,541	−0.6%
2014	25,082	−29.4%
Source: ,

The 2014 Myanmar Census reported that Dagon Township had a population of 25,082. The population density was 5,370.8 people per km^{2}. The census reported that the median age was 30.4 years, and a sex ratio of 90 males per 100 females. There were 4,608 households; the median household size was 4.4.

== Landmarks ==
The city protects the following landmarks in Dagon township.

Structure	Type	Address	Notes
BEHS 1 Dagon	School	57 Alanpyapaya Road	Former Methodist English High School
BEHS 2 Dagon	School	353 Myoma Kyaung Lane	Former Myoma High School
Department of Public Health Laboratory	Health clinic	35 Mawgundaik Lane	
Diplomatic Residence Compound	Housing	82 Pyidaungzu Yeiktha Avenue (Corner of Pyay Road)	
Eindawya Pagoda	Pagoda	Myoma Kyaung Lane	
India House	Office	35 Diplomat Avenue	
Kyargu Monastery	Monastery	49 Shwedagon Pagoda Road	
Maha Wizaya Pagoda	Pagoda	Shwedagon Pagoda Road	
Methodist English Church	Church	65 Alanpyapaya Road	
Ministry of Foreign Affairs	Office	37 Diplomat Avenue	
National Archives Department	Office	114 Pyidaungzu Yeiktha Avenue	
St. Gabriel's Church	Church	64 Shwedagon Pagoda Road	
St. John's Catholic Church	Church	25 Mawgundaik Lane (Corner of Shwedagon Pagoda Road)	
Sein Yaungchi Pagoda	Pagoda	Shwedagon Pagoda Road	
Shwedagon Pagoda	Pagoda	Shwedagon Pagoda Road	
Yahanda Ordination Hall	Temple	Shwedagon Pagoda Road	
Zafar Shah Darga	Shrine	6 Ziwaka Lane	
