= Seikkan Township =

Former township of Yangon in Myanmar

Seikkan Township ဆိပ်ကမ်း မြို့နယ်
- Township of Yangon
- Seikkan Township
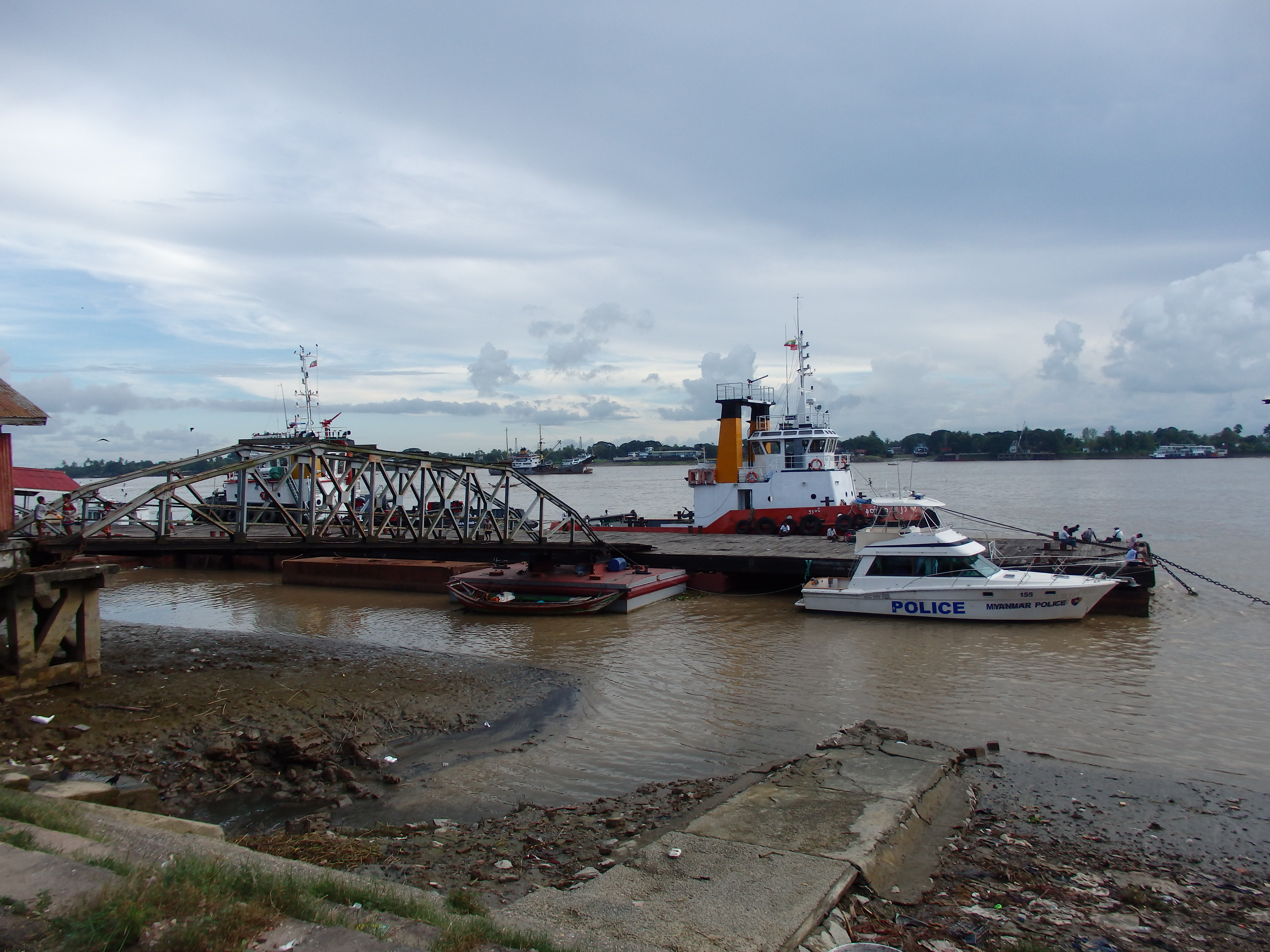
- A police boat and jetty in Seikkan Township

- Location within Myanmar
- Coordinates: 16°46′0″N 96°09′0″E
- Country: Myanmar
- Division: Yangon
- City: Yangon
- Township: Seikkan

Area
  - Total: 0.49 km^{2} (0.189 sq mi)

Population (2019)
  - Total: 1,503
  - Density: 3,070/km^{2} (7,950/sq mi)
- Time zone: UTC6:30 (MMT)
- Area codes: 1; (mobile: 80, 99)

Seikkan Township (Burmese: ဆိပ်ကမ်း မြို့နယ်, pronounced [sʰeiʔkáɰ̃ mjo̰nɛ̀]) was a township located in the western part of Yangon, Myanmar. One of the smallest townships, Seikkan consisted of just three wards. It had a primary school and a hospital.

Seikkan township was split and merged into Botataung Township and Lanmadaw Township in February 2020. The westernmost ward, the Maw Tin Temporary Market Quarter, was incorporated into Lanmadaw Township and the remaining two wards- the Seikkan Family Housing Complex and the Police Housing Complex- were incorporated into Botahtaung Township; the Seikkan Township is abolished,
