= Lanmadaw Township =

Lanmadaw Township လမ်းမတော် မြို့နယ်
- Township of Yangon
- Lanmadaw Township
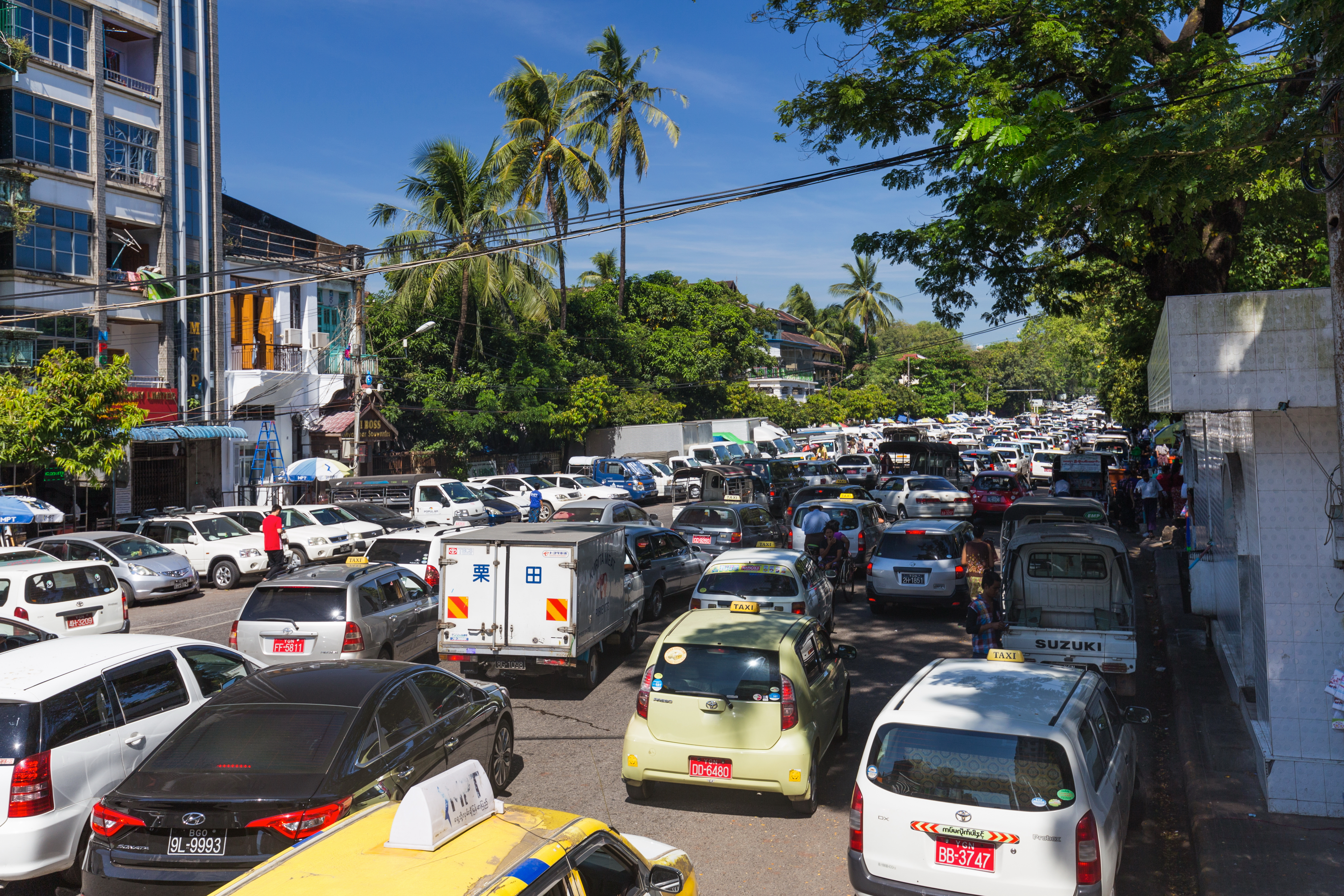
- A traffic jam in Lanmadaw

- Location within Myanmar
- Coordinates: 16°46′51″N 96°8′59″E
- Country: Myanmar
- Region: Yangon Region
- City: Yangon
- District: Kyauktada District

Area
  - Total: 1.4 km^{2} (0.54 sq mi)

Population (2014)
  - Total: 47,160
  - Density: 34,000/km^{2} (87,000/sq mi)
- Time zone: UTC6:30 (MST)
- Postal codes: 11131
- Area codes: 1 (mobile: 80, 99)

Lanmadaw Township (Burmese: လမ်းမတော် မြို့နယ်; pronounced [láɰ̃mədɔ̀ mjo̰nɛ̀]) is located in the western part of downtown Yangon, and shares borders with Ahlone Township in the west, Latha Township in the east, Seikkan Township and Yangon River in the south, and Dagon Township in the north. It consists of twelve wards and is home to five primary schools, two middle schools and two high schools. Lanmadaw and Latha townships make up the Yangon Chinatown. The township is home to a major public market, Nyaungbinlay Market.

Lanmadaw Township is home to Yangon Institute of Nursing, one of the campuses of University of Medicine 1, Yangon, and Thayettaw, a monastic complex that houses over 60 urban Buddhist monasteries (kyaung).

== Landmarks ==
The following landmark buildings and structures are protected by the city.

Structure	Type	Address	Notes
BEHS 1 Lanmadaw	School	120-140 Min Ye Kyawzwa Street	Former St. John's English High School
BEHS 2 Lanmadaw	School	Annawyahtar Street	
BEPS 6 Lanmadaw	School	183-185 Lanmadaw Road	
Hashin Casin Patil Trust Mosque	Mosque	61-63 Wardan Street	
Lanmadaw Township Office of Electrical Engineers	Office	568 Strand Road	
Myanmar Baptist Church Union	Church	143 Min Ye Kyawzwa Street	
University of Medicine 1, Yangon Lanmadaw Campus	University	245 Lanmadaw Road	
Yangon Central Women’s Hospital	Hospital	Min Ye Kyawzwa Street	
