= Nyaungbinlay Market =

Major public market in Yangon, Myanmar

Nyaungbinlay Market ညောင်ပင်လေးဈေး
- Location: Lanmadaw Township, Yangon, Myanmar; 16.77302818622013°N 96.14708346304197°E
- Opening date: c. 1945; 81 years ago
- Developer: Yuzana Company
- Management: Yangon City Development Committee
- Number of tenants: 1,073
- Interactive map of Nyaungbinlay Market

Nyaungbinlay Market (Burmese: ညောင်ပင်လေးဈေး), also called Nyaungbinlay Plaza (ညောင်ပင်လေးပလာဇာ), is a public market located in Lanmadaw Township, Yangon, Myanmar. It is one of the oldest public markets in Yangon, and the name "Nyaungbinlay" can be translated as "little banyan tree. According to data from the Yangon City Development Committee (YCDC), the market currently occupies 1.784 acres and contains 1,073 shop units.

== History ==
It was originally opened as the Lanmadaw Temporary Market in 1945–46. It was renamed the Nyaungbinlay Riverside Market in 1968 and operated as a self-built temporary market. In 1972, the market's temporary stalls were removed, and three market buildings were systematically established. On 9 September 1994, the market was relocated to government-owned land near the corner of Bogyoke Road and Zawgyi Road in Lanmadaw Township. The relocated market consisted of 26 market buildings with a total of 1,016 shop units. On 25 December 1996, the market was relocated again to a vacant government-owned site on Minye Kyawswa Road, near the Ministry of Energy office, where 30 market buildings containing 776 shop units were established. Finally, on 23 March 1997, the temporary market was moved to its current location and officially established as Nyaungbinlay Market.

On 1 February 2022, during the nationwide Silent Strike marking the first anniversary of the 2021 Myanmar coup d'état, the military authorities ordered major markets, including Nyaungbinlay Market, to remain open despite calls by activists for businesses to close. The order coincided with the Chinese New Year holiday, placing some merchants in a difficult position between observing the holiday and complying with the authorities.
