= Sule Pagoda =

Buddhist Pagoda in Yangon, Myanmar

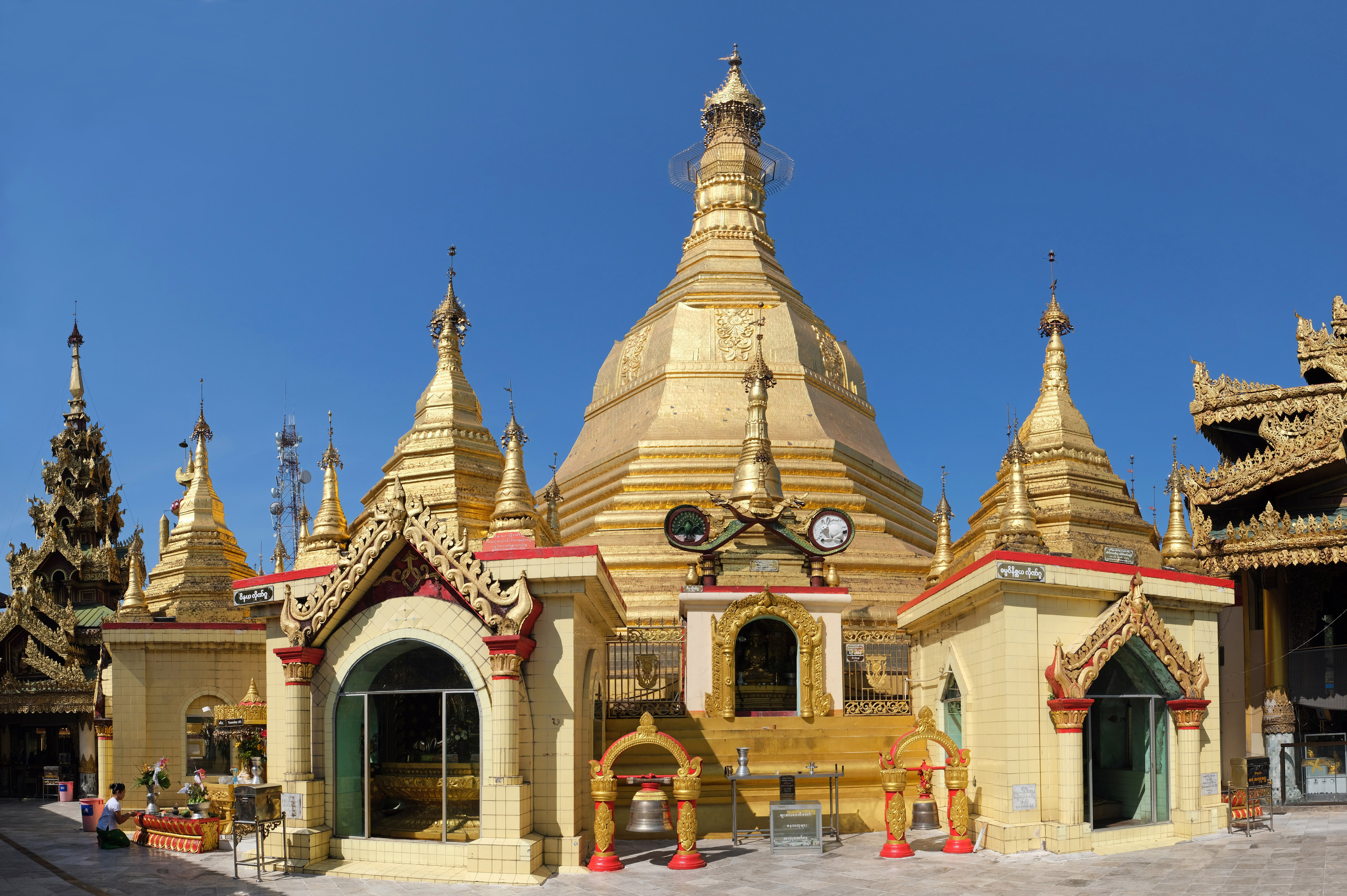
- Sule Pagoda is centrally located in Yangon as a religious and historic site.
- Interactive map of the Sule Pagoda area

General information
- Type: Centre of Yangon City and political and religious focal point
- Location: Yangon, Burma
- Coordinates: 16°46′27.8″N 96°9′31.6″E
- Completed: approx. 2500 years ago

Yangon City Landmark

The Sule Pagoda (Burmese: ဆူးလေဘုရား; pronounced [sʰúlè pʰəjá]) is a Burmese Buddhist stupa located in the heart of downtown Yangon, occupying the centre of the city and an important space in contemporary Burmese politics, ideology and geography. According to legend, it was built before the Shwedagon Pagoda during the time of the Buddha, making it more than 2,600 years old. Burmese legend states that the site for the Shwedagon Pagoda was asked to be revealed from an old nat who resided at the place where the Sule Pagoda now stands.

The Sule Pagoda has been the focal point of both Yangon and Burmese politics. It has served as a rallying point in the 1988 uprisings, the 2007 Saffron Revolution and the 2021 Spring Revolution.

The pagoda is on the Yangon City Heritage List.

== Stupa ==
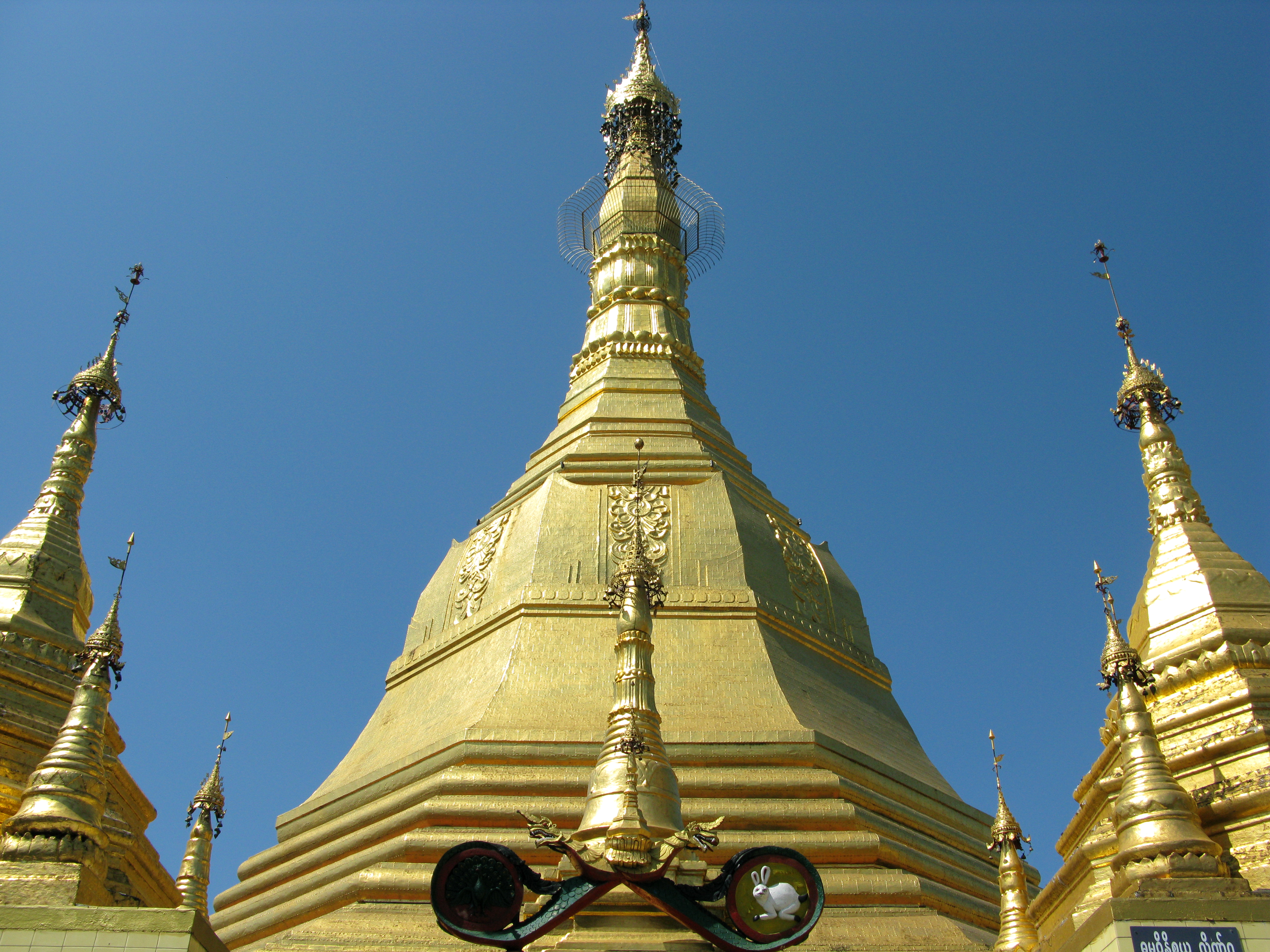
Stupa

The Sule Pagoda incorporated the original Indian structure of the stupa, which initially was used to replicate the form and function of a relic mound. However, as Burmese culture became more independent of the Indian influences, local architectural forms began to change the shape of the pagoda. It is believed to enshrine a strand of hair of the Buddha who is said to have given it himself to two Burmese merchant brothers, Trapusa and Bahalika. The dome structure, topped with a golden spire, extends into the skyline, marking the cityscape.

== History and legend ==
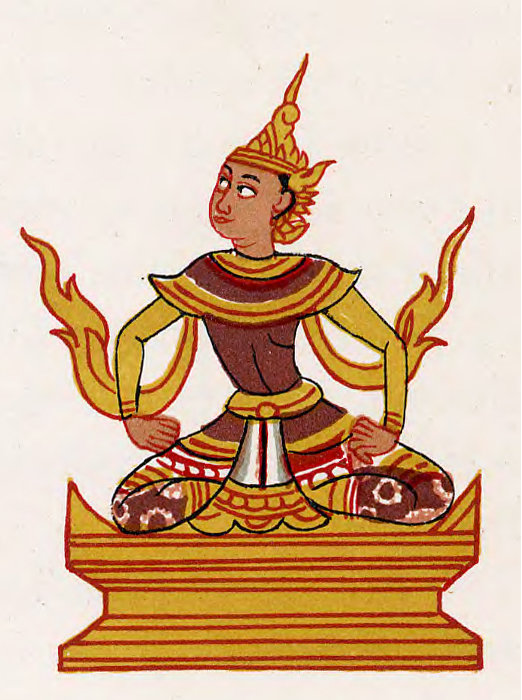
An artistic rendition of Sularata, the nat of Sule Pagoda

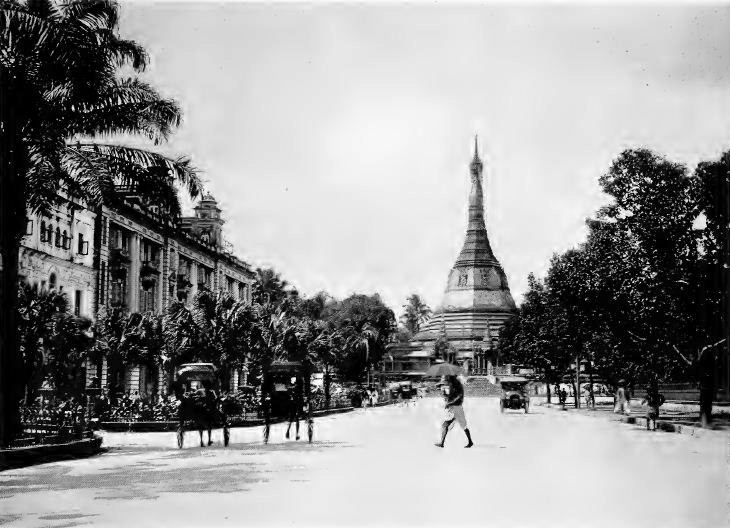
Sule Pagoda in 1890s

According to Burmese legend, the site where the Sule Pagoda now stands was once the home of a powerful nat (spirit) named Sularata (the Sule Nat). The king of the Nats, Sakka, wished to help the legendary king Okkalapa build a shrine for the Buddha's sacred hair-relic on the same site where three previous Buddhas had buried sacred relics in past ages. However, these events had happened so long ago that not even Sakka knew exactly where the relics were buried. The Sule nat, however, who was so old that his eyelids had to be propped up with trees in order for him to stay awake, had witnessed the great event. The gods, Nats and humans of the court of Okkalapa therefore gathered around the Sule nat and asked him the location, which he eventually remembered.

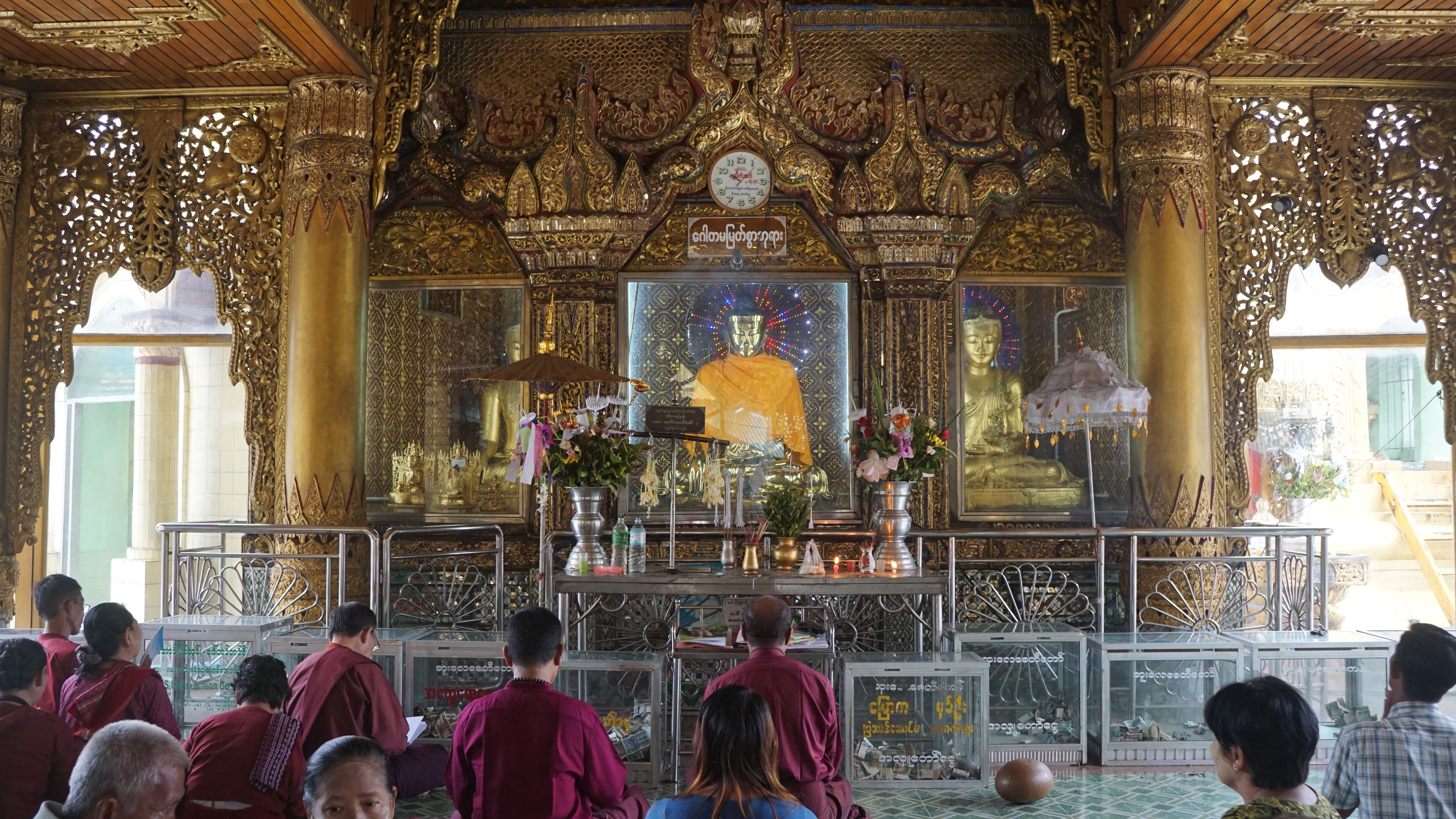
Inside the Sule pagoda

The Sule Pagoda was made the center of Yangon by Lt. Alexander Fraser of the Bengal Engineers, who created the present street layout of Yangon soon after the British occupation in the middle of the 19th century. (Lt. Fraser also lent his name to Fraser Street, now Anawrattha Street and still one of the main thoroughfares of Yangon). It is a Mon-style chedi (pagoda), octagonal in shape, with each side 24 ft (7.3 m) long; its height is 144 ft 9 1/2 in (44.133 m). Except for the chedi itself, enlarged to its present size by Queen Shin Sawbu (1453–1472), nothing at the pagoda is more than a little over a century old. Around the chedi are ten bronze bells of various sizes and ages with inscriptions recording their donors' names and the dates of their dedication. Various explanations have been put forward for the name, of varying degrees of trustworthiness: according to legend it was called su-way, meaning "gather around", when Okkapala and the divine beings inquired about the location of Singattura Hill, and the pagoda was then built to commemorate the event; another legend connects it su-le, meaning wild brambles, with which it was supposedly overgrown, and a non-legendary suggestion links it to the Pali words cula, meaning "small" and ceti, "pagoda".

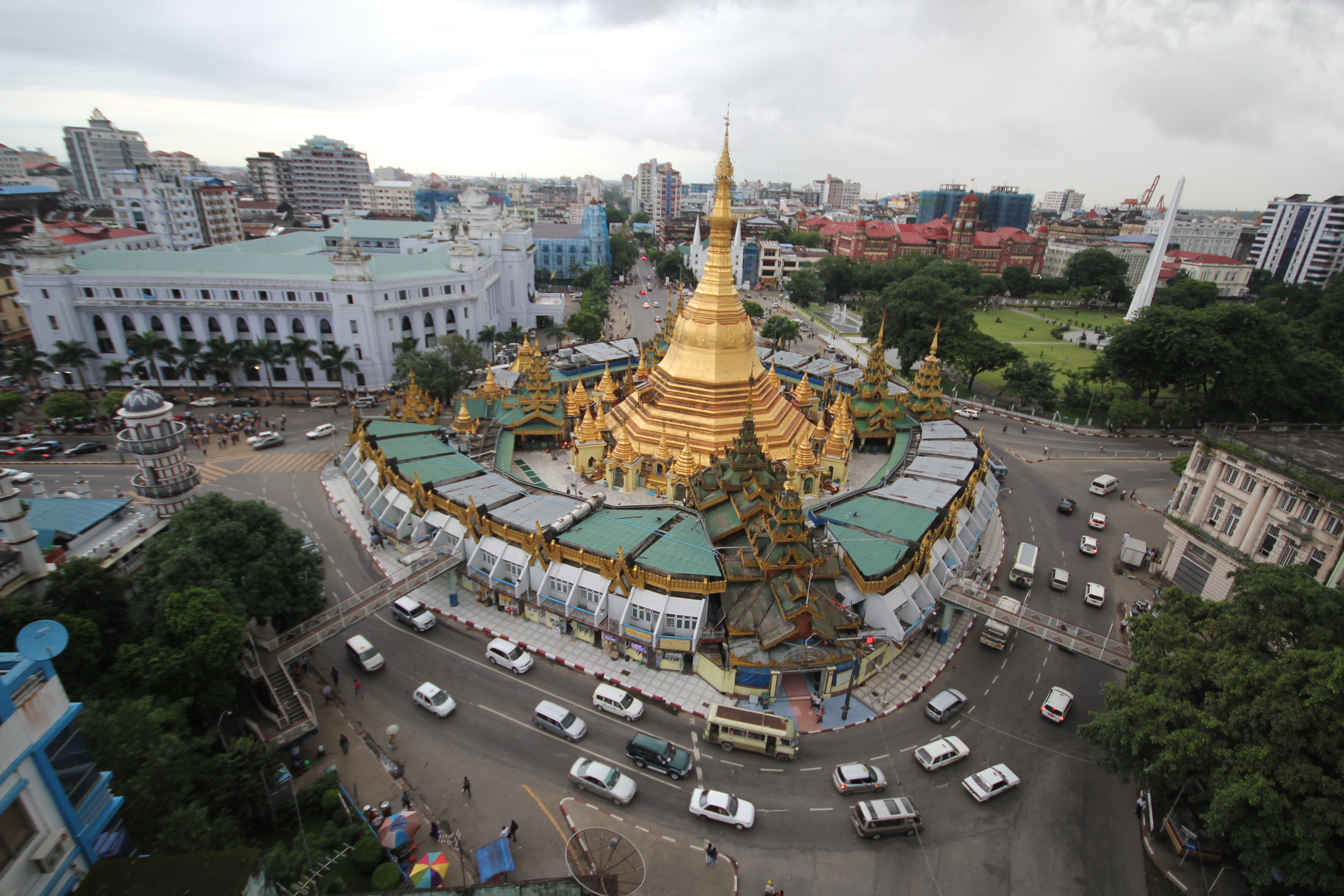
View of the Sule Pagoda Roundabout

== Location ==
The Sule Pagoda is located in the center of downtown Yangon and is part of the city's economic and public life. During the 1988 and 2007 protests, the Sule Pagoda was a functional meeting point for anti-government and pro-democracy protesters.

== Role in Burmese politics ==
During the 8888 Uprising, the pagoda was an organizing point and destination selected on the basis of its location and symbolic meaning. In 2007, during the Saffron Revolution, the Sule Pagoda was again utilized as a rallying point for the pro-democracy demonstrations. Many thousands of Buddhist monks gathered to pray around the pagoda. Sadly, in both 1988 and 2007, the Sule Pagoda became the first place to witness the brutal reaction by the Burmese government against the protesters.

== See also ==
- Cetiya
- Burmese pagoda
- Shwedagon Pagoda
- Kaba Aye Pagoda
- Botataung Pagoda
- Maha Wizaya Pagoda
- Buddhism in Burma
