= Alanpya Pagoda =

Burmese pagoda in Yangon, Myanmar

- အလံပြစေတီ
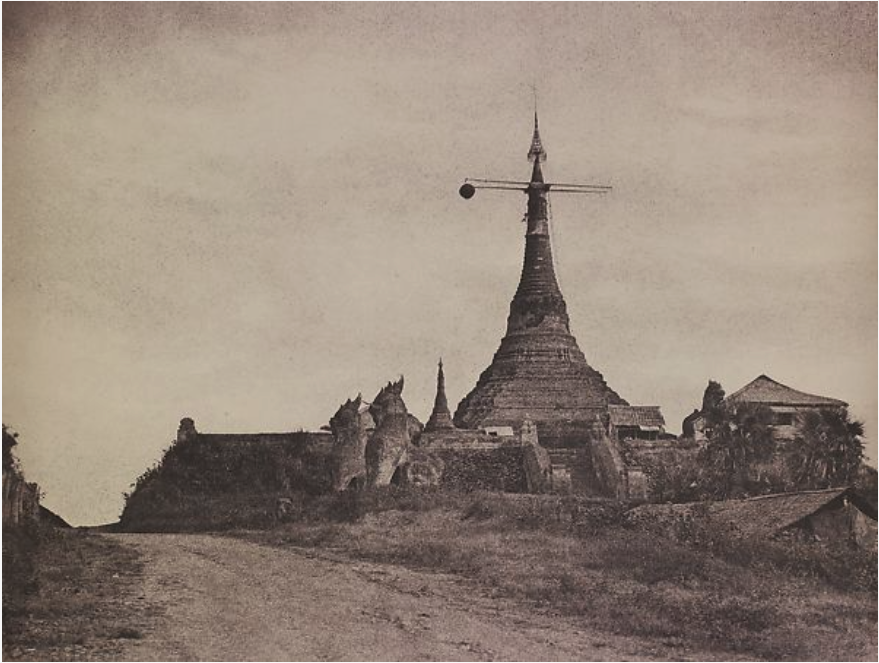
- Alanpya Pagoda in 1855; With the time ball attached by the British

- Location in Myanmar

Religion
- Affiliation: Buddhism
- Sect: Theravada Buddhism
- Region: Yangon Region

Location
- Municipality: Yangon
- Country: Myanmar
- Interactive map of Alanpya Pagoda
- Coordinates: 16.790324°N 96.154699°E

Specifications
- Height (max): nyandaw height: 29.97 m (98.3 ft)
- Spire height: with hti inclusive: 33.91 m (111.3 ft)

Alanpya Pagoda (Burmese: အလံပြစေတီ; also known as Signal Pagoda) is a Burmese pagoda located on Alanpya Hill, on the southern part of Dhammarakhita Hill, in Yangon, Myanmar. The pagoda is south of Maha Wizaya Pagoda.

== Names ==
Alanpya Pagoda is known by a number of various names. During British rule in Burma, the pagoda acquired its present-day name, Signal Pagoda (Alanpya Zedi in Burmese), because it was used as a signal station for vessels coming up Yangon River. It was also known as McCreagh's Pagoda, after Brigadier McCreagh, and as Sale's Pagoda, after Lieutenant Robert Sale, who was stationed there during the First Anglo-Burmese War. The pagoda has also been known as Sandawkyo Pagoda (ဆံတော်ကြိုစေတီ), Gurkha Pagoda, and Tattoo Pagoda (တပ်ဦးစေတီ), as well as by its Mon language name, Kyaik Hapaw Cih (ကျာ်ထပှ်ထစှေ်, [caik həpɔh cih]).

== History ==
According to the Shwedagon Chronicle, the pagoda pre-dates Shwedagon Pagoda, and was built on the site of a pavilion honoring the arrival of the Buddha's hair relics. The pagoda was toppled in 1348 and subsequently renovated by King Razadarit. In 1452, Queen Shin Sawbu gilded the entire pagoda, which was reconstructed by King Bayinnaung in 1564. The pagoda was rebuilt yet again in 1775 by Min Letwe, King Hsinbyushin's minister. The pagoda's site subsequently became a military encampment for British forces following the First Anglo-Burmese War. The pagoda's present hti (umbrella) was donated in November 1910.
