= Basic Education High School No. 1 Lanmadaw =

School in Yangon, Myanmar

Coordinates: 16°47′00.8″N 96°08′17.4″E

- အခြေခံ ပညာ အထက်တန်း ကျောင်း အမှတ် (၁) လမ်းမတော်
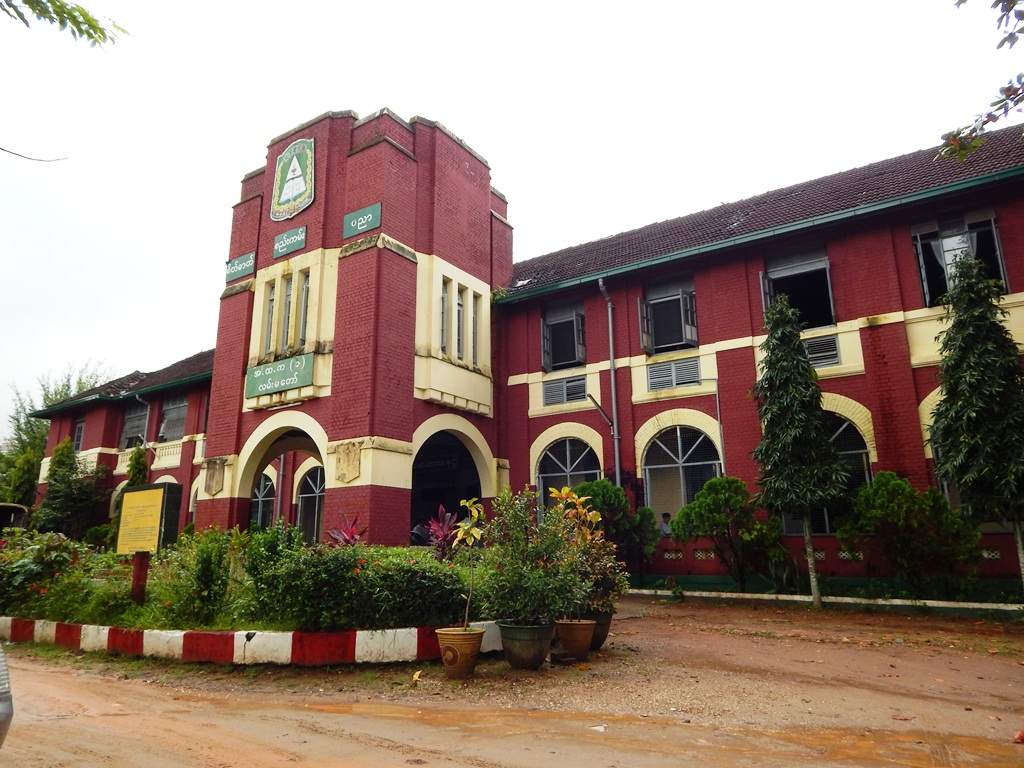

Location
- 120–140 Minye Kyawswa Street, Lanmadaw 11131; Yangon, Yangon Region; Myanmar

Information
- Other name: St. John's High School
- Type: Public
- Established: 1861; 165 years ago
- School number: 1
- Grades: K-10

Yangon City Landmark

Basic Education High School No. 1 Lanmadaw (Burmese: အခြေခံ ပညာ အထက်တန်း ကျောင်း အမှတ် (၁) လမ်းမတော်; commonly known as Lanmadaw 1 High School or St. John's High School), located in Lanmadaw township, is a public high school in Yangon, Myanmar.

The school's main colonial era building is a landmark protected by the city, and is listed on the Yangon City Heritage List.

The first organized football match in Myanmar (then British Burma) was played at its field in 1879. The field is still extant, though the school has been renovated with the passage of time.
