= Myanmar Standard Time =

Time zone in Myanmar

- Time zone
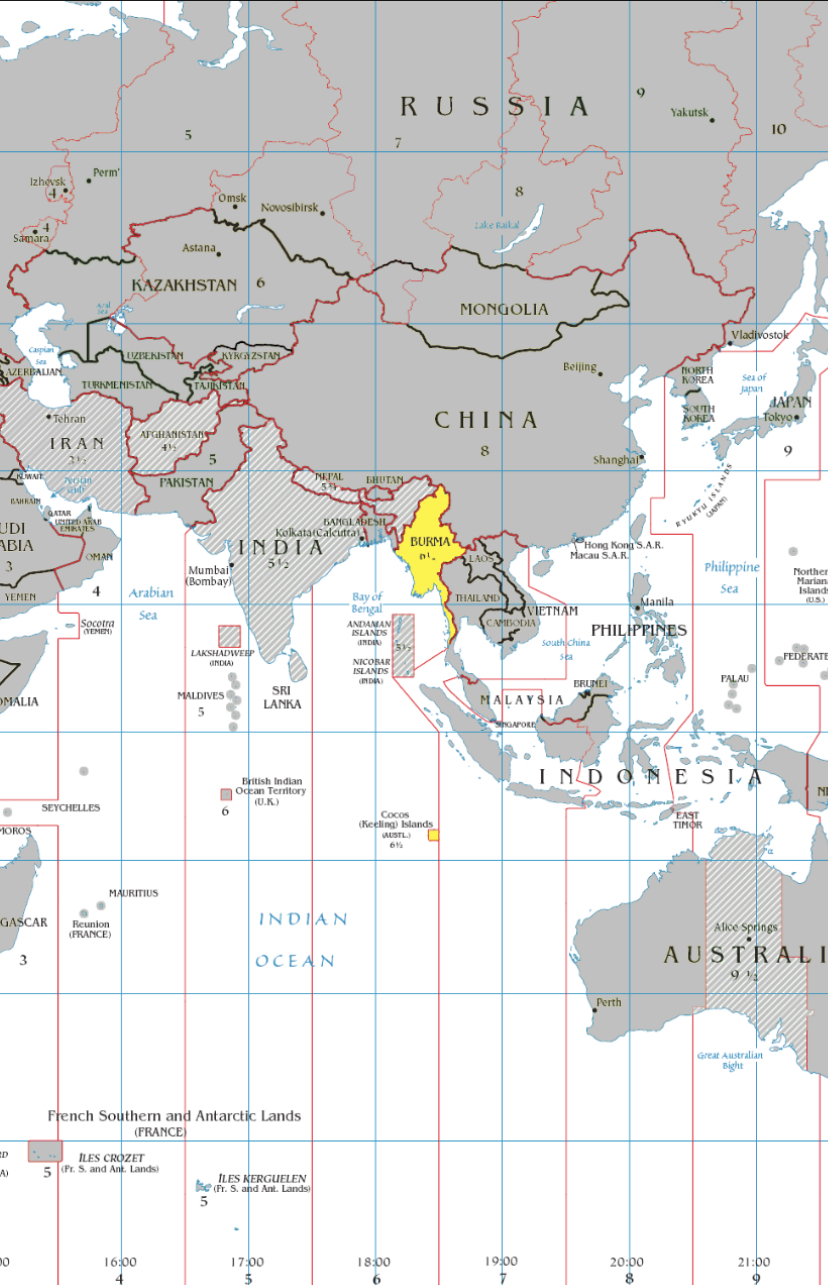
- Myanmar Standard Time

UTC offset
- MMT: UTC+06:30

Current time
- :: UTC [refresh]

Myanmar Standard Time (MMT; Burmese: မြန်မာ စံတော်ချိန်, [mjəmà sàɰ̃dɔ̀dʑèiɰ̃]), formerly Burma Standard Time (BST), is the standard time in Myanmar, 6.5 hours ahead of UTC. Myanmar Standard Time is calculated on the basis of 97°30′E longitude. MMT is used all year round, as Myanmar has never observed daylight saving time.

== History ==
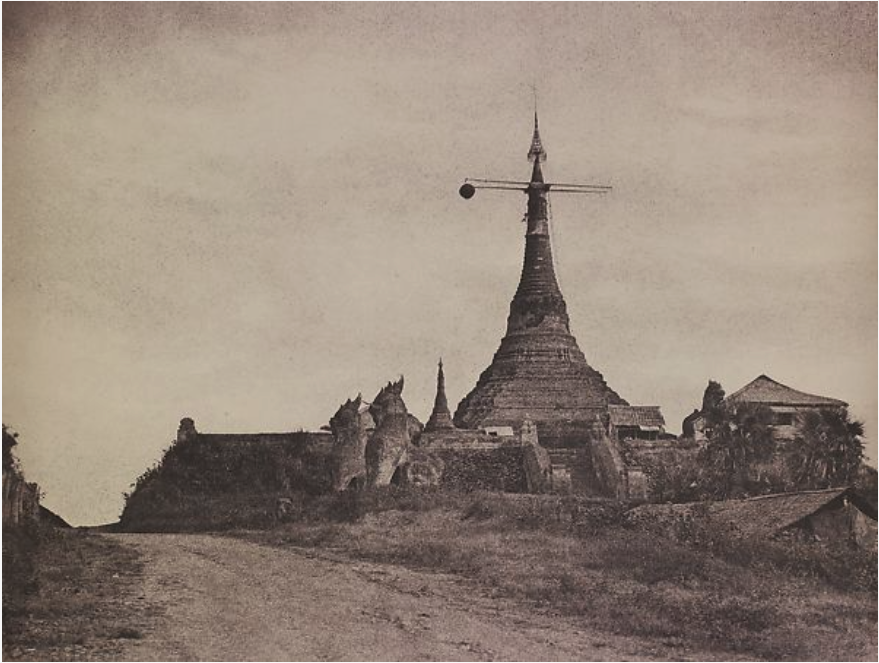
The Alanpya "Signal" Pagoda in Rangoon/Yangon in 1855. The time ball attached to the top of the pagoda by the British is visible.

=== Pre-colonial period ===
Myanmar did not have a standard time before the British colonial period. Each region kept its own local mean time, according to the Burmese calendar rules: sunrise, noon, sunset and midnight. (Note: (Clancy 1906: 57): The Burmese calendar recognizes two types of day: astronomical and civil. The mean Burmese astronomical day is from midnight to midnight, and represents 1/30th of a synodic month or 23 hours, 37 minutes and 28.08 seconds. The civil day comprises two halves, the first half beginning at sunrise and the second half at sunset.) The day was divided into eight 3-hour segments called baho (ဗဟို), or sixty 24-minute segments called nayi (နာရီ). Although the calendar consists of time units down to the millisecond level, the popular usage never extended beyond baho and at most nayi measurements; a gong was struck every nayi while a drum (စည်) and a large bell (ခေါင်းလောင်း) were struck to mark every baho.

Type	Time	Burmese name	Description
Day	1 o'clock	နံနက် တစ်ချက်တီး	midway between sunrise and midday
Day	2 o'clock	နေ့ နှစ်ချက်တီး	noon (midday)
Day	3 o'clock	နေ့ သုံးချက်တီး	midway between noon and sunset
Day	4 o'clock	နေ့ လေးချက်တီး	sunset
Night	1 o'clock	ည တစ်ချက်တီး	midway between sunset and midnight
Night	2 o'clock	ည နှစ်ချက်တီး	midnight
Night	3 o'clock	ည သုံးချက်တီး	midway between midnight and sunrise
Night	4 o'clock	နံနက် လေးချက်တီး	sunrise

=== Colonial period ===
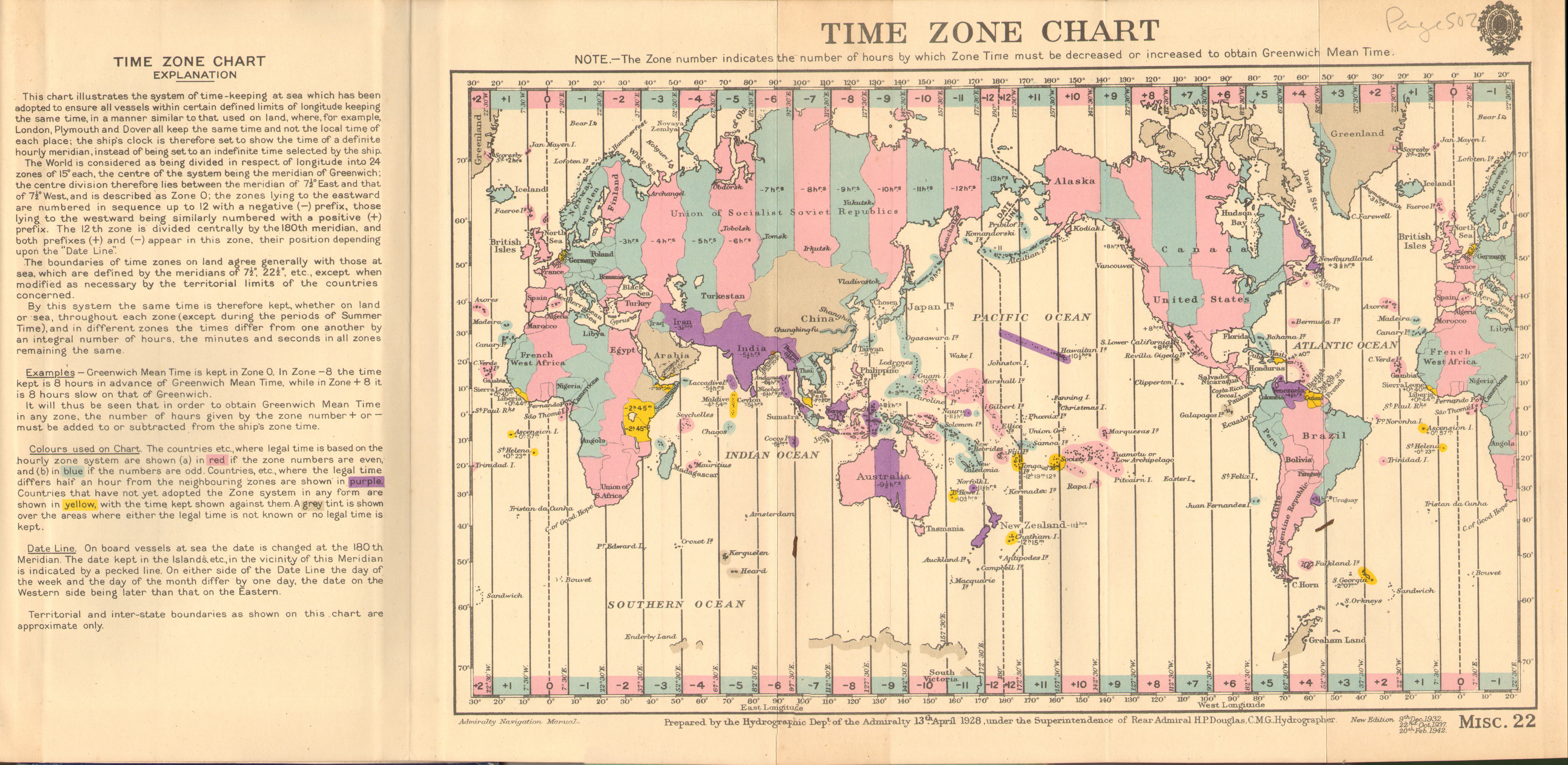
Burma at 6:30 ahead of the GMT on this 1928 world map of time zones

The use of a common time began in British Burma in the late 19th century. The first confirmed mention of Rangoon Mean Time (RMT) at GMT+6:24:40 (Note: The time offset of 6:24:40 was the time used by the official time signal station in Rangoon per (Kinns 2020: 545) and the Admiralty (Admiralty 1895: 27); it was confirmed by the US Naval Intelligence report (USNI 1928: 723). The IANA database (https://www.iana.org/time-zones, version 2021e, released on 2021-10-21) gives 6:24:47, citing a secondary source (Reed and Low, The Indian Year Book, 1936–37, pp. 27–28); to be sure, the maintainers of the database do state that "this file is by no means authoritative." The 6:24:47 figure of (Reed and Low) may have been a typographical error from the 6:24:37 time given in (Indian Railway Board 1906: 7) which states that "... in Burma 6 1/2 hours ahead of Greenwich and 5 minutes 23 [sic] seconds earlier than Rangoon time." The Railway Board's 6:24:37 is likely false as the Admiralty records from 1898 to 1922 all say the official Rangoon time (per Kinns 2020: 545) was 6:24:40.) being in use was in 1892, a year before the country's first time ball observatory (Note: (Kinns 2020: 544): The British apparently were using a local pagoda (later came to be known as the Signal Pagoda) in Rangoon for signaling at least since 1855, three years after their annexation of Lower Burma; but "no supporting evidence of a Rangoon time signal has been found in notices prior to 1893.") was opened in Rangoon (Yangon) on 1 October 1893. However, the use of RMT as the common time, at least in some sectors, most probably started earlier. (The country's first rail service, between Rangoon and Prome (Pyay), began on 2 May 1877, and the non-authoritative IANA time zone database says RMT was introduced in 1880.) On 1 July 1905, a new standard time called Burma Standard Time (BST) at GMT+6:30—set to the longitude 97° 30' E, and 5 minutes and 20 seconds ahead of RMT—was first adopted by the Railways and Telegraph administrations. Although the rest of the country came to adopt BST, RMT continued to be used in the city of Rangoon at least to 1927. (Note: An April 1927 dispatch by the US Naval Intelligence (USNI 1928: 723) says that the whole country, except Rangoon, used the standard time, GMT+6:30, while the city of Rangoon still used Rangoon Mean Time, which was 5 minutes 20 seconds behind Burma Standard Time (or GMT+6:24:40).) By 1930, however, BST apparently had been adopted in Rangoon as well. (Note: (Kinns 2020: 545): the UK Admiralty records show that the time ball at the Rangoon time signal station was dropped twice each day, once at GMT+17:30:00 for 00:00:00 BST (i.e. GMT+6:30:00) and also at GMT+17:35:20 for 00:00:00 RMT (i.e. GMT+6:24:40); it was only in 1930 that the time ball at Rangoon was dropped for the standard time (GMT+6:30:00).)

The standard time was changed to Japan Standard Time (JST) during the Japanese occupation of the country (1942–1945) in World War II.

=== After independence ===
The standard time was reverted to GMT+6:30 after the war. It has remained ever since, even after the country's independence in 1948. The only change has been its name in English; the official English name has been changed to Myanmar Standard Time presumably since 1989 when the country's name in English was changed from Burma to Myanmar. The country does not observe a daylight saving time.

== Timeline of common times ==
Name	Period	Offset from UTC	Notes
Rangoon Mean Time	2 May 1877? – 30 June 1905	UTC+6:24:40	Standard time for British Burma from at least 1892 to 30 June 1905. Continued to be used in Rangoon (Yangon) at least to 1927 perhaps until 1929.
Burma Standard Time	1 July 1905 – 30 April 1942	UTC+6:30:00	First adopted by Railways and Telegraph offices in 1905. The October 2021 IANA database says it was introduced in 1920 but does not provide a source.
Japan Standard Time	1 May 1942 – 2 May 1945	UTC+09:00:00	Standard time during the Japanese occupation
Burma/Myanmar Standard Time	3 May 1945 – present	UTC+06:30:00	

== IANA time zone database ==
The IANA time zone database contains one time zone named Asia/Yangon for Myanmar

c.c.	Coordinates	Timezone name	Comments	UTC offset
MM	+1647+09610	Asia/Yangon		+06:30

== Bibliography ==
- BBC News (2 December 2011). "Who, What, Why: Should it be Burma or Myanmar?". BBC News.
- Chailley-Bert, Joseph (1894). The Colonisation of Indo-China. Translated by Arthur Baring Brabant. London: A. Constable & Company.
- Clancy, J.C. (January 1906). T. Lewis; H.P. Hollis (eds.). "The Burmese Calendar: A Monthly Review of Astronomy". The Observatory. XXIX (366).
- Bay of Bengal Pilot, London: Hydrographic Office, Admiralty, 1895
- "Time Zone Database, 2021e". IANA Time Zone Database. 2021-10-21.
- Kinns, Roger (2020). "Time Signals for Mariners in India, Burma and Ceylon" (PDF). Journal of Astronomical History and Heritage. 23 (3). Chiang Mai: National Astronomical Research Institute of Thailand: 523–552. Bibcode:2020JAHH...23..523K. doi:10.3724/SP.J.1440-2807.2020.03.05. S2CID 256563687.
- Kinns, Roger (2021). "Time Signals for Mariners in Southeast Asia: Time Balls, Discs, Bells, Guns and Lights". In Wayne Orchiston; Mayank N. Vahia (eds.). Exploring the History of Southeast Asian Astronomy: A Review of Current Projects and Future Prospects and Possibilities. Cham, Switzerland: Springer. ISBN 978-3-030-62776-8.
- The Railway Board of India (1906). Administration Report on the Railways in India for the Calendar Year 1905. Simla: Manager of Publications.
- Union of Myanmar Ministry of Information (2002). Myanmar: Facts and Figures. Ministry of Information, Union of Myanmar.
- United States National Bureau of Standards (1935). Standard Time Throughout the World. Washington: United States Department of Commerce.
- United States Nautical Almanac Office (17 May 2013). The Nautical Almanac for the Year 2014. Government Printing Office. p. 262. ISBN 978-0-16-091756-1.
- United States Naval Observatory (1906). Publications of the United States Naval Observatory. Vol. IV. Washington, DC: U.S. Government Printing Office.
- United States Office of Naval Intelligence (1928). Port Directory of the Principal Foreign Ports. Washington: US Naval Department.
