= Maha Wizaya Pagoda =

Pagoda in Myanmar

- မဟာဝိဇယစေတီ Māhavijayacetiya
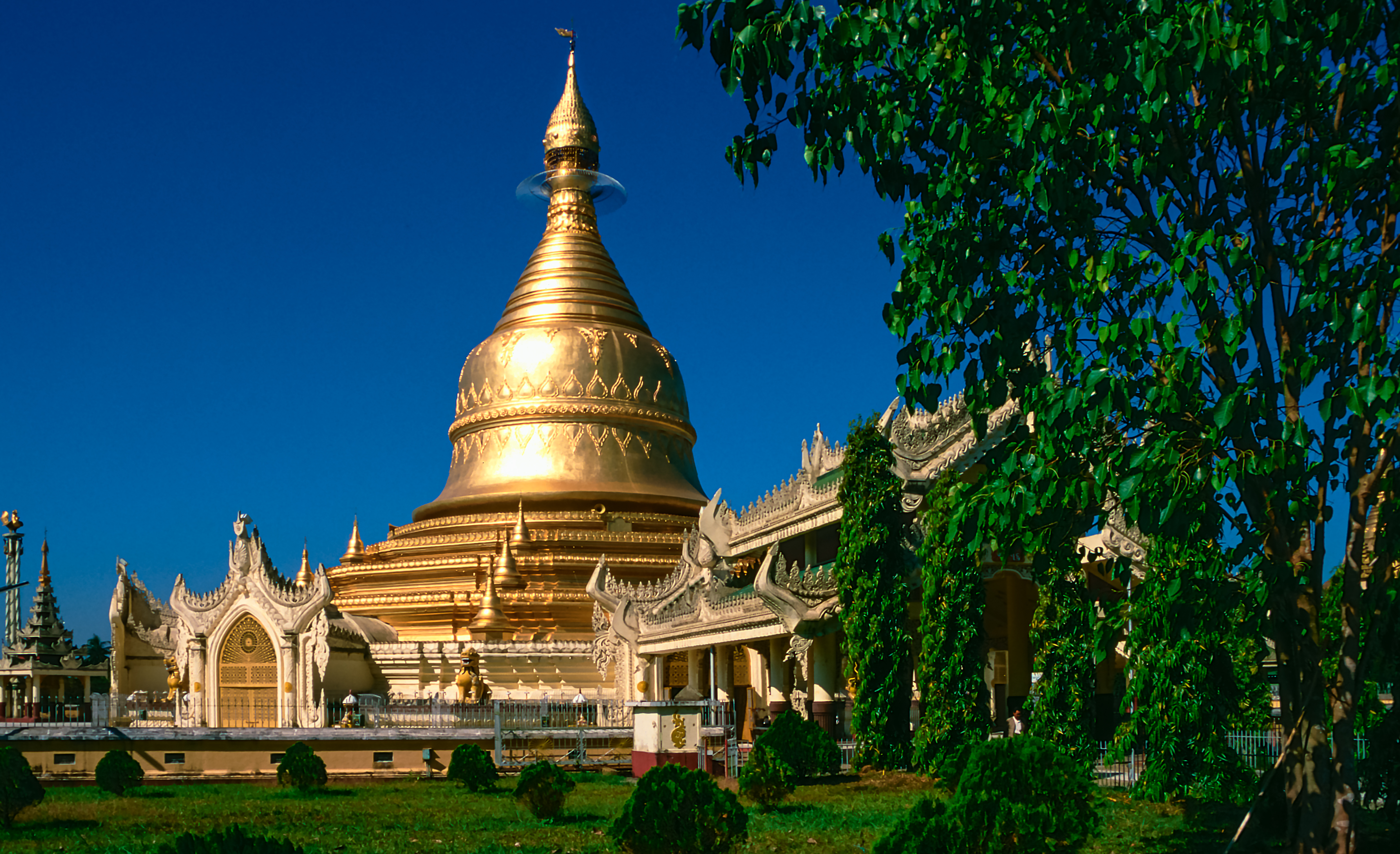

- Location within Myanmar

Religion
- Affiliation: Theravada Buddhism

Location
- Location: Dagon Township, Yangon
- Country: Myanmar
- Coordinates: 16.794871°N 96.152176°E

Architecture
- Founder: Ne Win
- Completed: 1980; 46 years ago

Designations

Yangon City Landmark

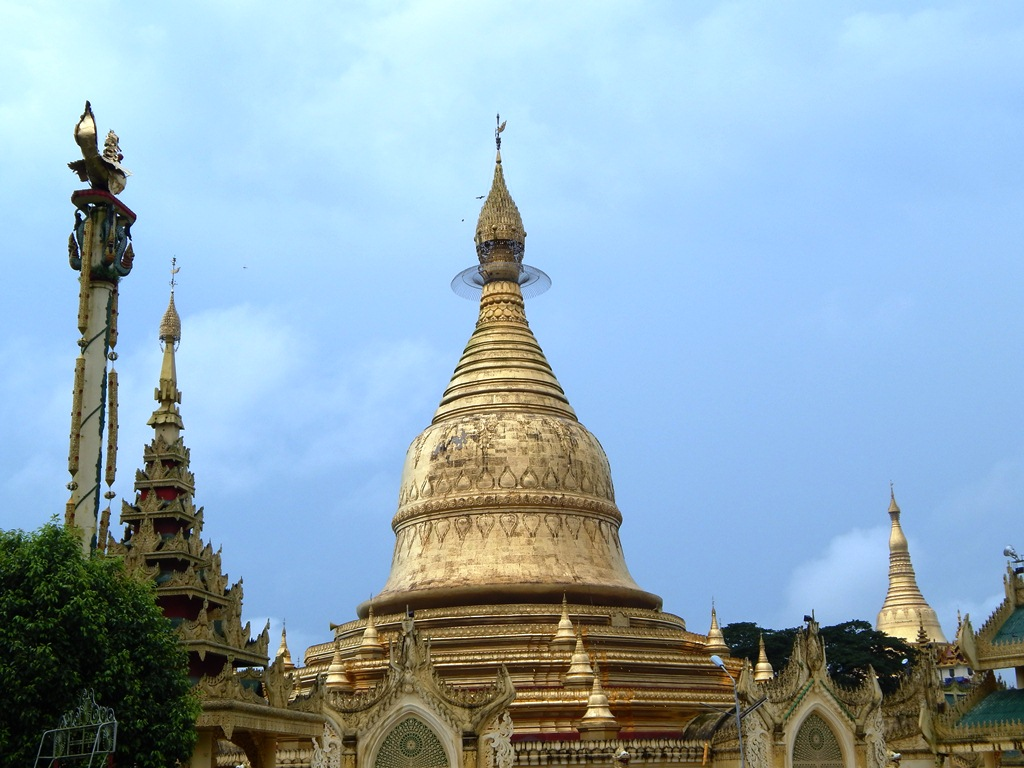
Maha Wizaya Pagoda

The Maha Wizaya Pagoda (Burmese: မဟာဝိဇယစေတီ; Pali: Māhavijayacetiya) is a pagoda located on Shwedagon Pagoda Road in Dagon Township, Yangon, Myanmar. The pagoda, built in 1980, is located immediately south of the Shwedagon Pagoda on Dhammarakhita Hill. The enshrined relics were contributed by the King of Nepal, while the pagoda's hti (umbrella) was consecrated by Ne Win, the country's former leader. Some scholars believe Ne Win constructed this particular pagoda for merit-making.

The pagoda commemorates the convening of the First Congregation of All Orders for the Purification, Perpetuation and Propagation of the Sasana in 1980, which formed the State Sangha Maha Nayaka Committee, a government regulatory body of Buddhist monks.
