= The Voice Myanmar season 2 =

Burmese reality talent show

The Voice Myanmar
- Season 2
- Hosted by: Tayzar Kyaw
- Judges: Kyar Pauk; Ni Ni Khin Zaw; Yan Yan Chan; R Zarni
- Winner: Novem Htoo
- Winning coach: Kyar Pauk

Release
- Original network: MRTV-4
- Original release: February 24 – June 16, 2019

Season chronology
- ← Previous; Season 1 Next → Season 3

The second season of Burmese reality talent show The Voice Myanmar premiered on February 24, 2019 on MRTV-4. Kyar Pauk, Ni Ni Khin Zaw, Yan Yan Chan and new coach R Zarni were coaches for this season.

== Blind auditions ==
The first episode of the Blind auditions premiered on February 24, 2019.

Color key

✔	Coach hit his/her "I WANT YOU" button
	Artist defaulted to this coach's team
	Artist elected to join this coach's team
	Artist eliminated with no coach pressing his or her "I WANT YOU" button

=== Episode 1 (February 24) ===
Order	Artist	Age	Hometown	Song	Coach's and artist's choices			
Order	Artist	Age	Hometown	Song	Kyar Pauk	Ni Ni Khin Zaw	Yan Yan Chan	R Zarni
1	A Day	26	N/A	"Bee Kyae"	✔	✔	–	✔
2	Hein Zaw Lin	25	N/A	"Yin Mar A Yin A Taing"	–	–	✔	✔
3	Khoon Wadi Pyae	30	N/A	"Ma Pyaung Lae Naing Tae A Chit"	–	✔	✔	✔
4	May Day	N/A	N/A	"Sate Dap Ma Kya Nae"	–	–	–	–
5	Twins Star	21	N/A	"T Amo"	✔	✔	✔	✔
6	Khine	21	N/A	"Can't Take My Eyes Off You"	✔	✔	✔	✔
7	Just	20	N/A	"A Htee Kyan Witnyin"	–	–	✔	–
8	Novem Htoo	27	N/A	"Spit It Out"	✔	✔	✔	✔

=== Episode 2 (March 3) ===
Order	Artist	Age	Hometown	Song	Coach's and artist's choices			
Order	Artist	Age	Hometown	Song	Kyar Pauk	Ni Ni Khin Zaw	Yan Yan Chan	R Zarni
1	Kyal Sin	26	N/A	"A Chit Tae Lar"	✔	–	✔	–
2	Zayye Paing	23	N/A	"A May Yae Dotkha Ao Lay"	✔	✔	✔	✔
3	Aung Naing Min	29	N/A	"Chit Daw Da Mee"	–	–	✔	✔
4	Tar Tar	25	N/A	"Ma Sin Sar Chin Buu"	–	✔	–	✔
5	Nicholas Pasangma	26	N/A	"Perfect"	–	✔	–	✔
6	Kyaw Kyaw	N/A	N/A	"Tasay Ta Kaung Ka Tae Nya"	–	–	–	–
7	Pan Pan Kye Mon	34	N/A	"Pu Htu Sin"	–	✔	✔	✔
8	Nyo Mie Mie Htun	19	N/A	"A Myae Tan Min Shi Tal"	✔	✔	✔	✔
9	Thunn	21	N/A	"Time To Say Goodbye"	–	✔	–	–

=== Episode 3 (March 10) ===
Order	Artist	Age	Hometown	Song	Coach's and artist's choices			
Order	Artist	Age	Hometown	Song	Kyar Pauk	Ni Ni Khin Zaw	Yan Yan Chan	R Zarni
1	Hazel	25	N/A	"Ko A Twat Einmet Min Met Lar"	✔	✔	✔	✔
2	Grin Go	31	N/A	"Mway Yat Myay"	–	–	✔	–
3	Jue Jue	24	N/A	"Message (Jewel (Burmese singer))"	✔	–	–	–
4	Melody Khong	20	N/A	"Goodbye (Wyne Lay)"	–	✔	–	–
5	Solomon King	29	N/A	"Can't Help Falling in Love"	✔	✔	✔	✔
6	Yati	31	N/A	"A Shone Htet Po Thaw"	–	–	✔	–
7	Paul Austin	27	N/A	"When We Were Young"	✔	✔	✔	✔
8	Zam	N/A	N/A	"Lay Nyin Lay"	–	–	–	–

=== Episode 4 (March 17) ===
Order	Artist	Age	Hometown	Song	Coach's and artist's choices			
Order	Artist	Age	Hometown	Song	Kyar Pauk	Ni Ni Khin Zaw	Yan Yan Chan	R Zarni
1	Khant Shine	23	N/A	"Waidanar"	✔	✔	✔	✔
2	C Ko	28	N/A	"Dan Yar Myar Ei Ngal Kyun"	✔	–	✔	–
3	Sai Thein Kha Aung	25	N/A	"Never Enough (Loren Allred)"	✔	✔	–	✔
4	Htin Gyi	39	N/A	"Shay Ka Lann Ma Myar"	✔	✔	✔	✔
5	Yamone Zin Oo	24	N/A	"Pyit Taing Htaung"	–	–	✔	–
6	Biko	21	N/A	"Writing's on the Wall"	–	✔	✔	–
7	June Rose	22	N/A	"My Happy Ending"	–	–	–	✔
8	Judson Fish	30	N/A	"Min Ma Shi Yin Ma Phit Lo"	✔	✔	✔	✔
9	Grace Mami	22	N/A	"A Chit Lo Khaw Tha Lar"	✔	–	–	–

=== Episode 5 (March 24) ===
Order	Artist	Age	Hometown	Song	Coach's and artist's choices			
Order	Artist	Age	Hometown	Song	Kyar Pauk	Ni Ni Khin Zaw	Yan Yan Chan	R Zarni
1	David Htoo	26	N/A	"Lwan Tae Sate"	–	✔	–	✔
2	Lhyan Wai Myat	16	N/A	"There's Nothing Holdin' Me Back"	–	–	✔	–
3	Oram	28	N/A	"Kyauk Sar Myar"	–	–	–	✔
4	Hpong Hpong	28	N/A	"A Chit Swan Arr"	–	✔	–	–
5	Arkar Aung Khin Win	32	N/A	"Ngar Tan Ta Nay Mar"	–	–	✔	–
6	Phyo Htet Ko	23	N/A	"Pyae Tasar"	✔	–	✔	–
7	Zin Mar Moe Sett	35	N/A	"Tan Ta Tae Nya"	–	–	–	✔
8	Aung Kaung Khant	N/A	N/A	"Tha Bar Wa Hnint Tway Sone Chin"	–	–	–	–
9	Lynn Khat	34	N/A	"Nyi Ma Lay"	–	–	✔	–
10	Ronnie Su	23	N/A	"Idontwannabeyouanymore"	✔	✔	–	–

=== Episode 6 (March 31) ===
Order	Artist	Age	Hometown	Song	Coach's and artist's choices			
Order	Artist	Age	Hometown	Song	Kyar Pauk	Ni Ni Khin Zaw	Yan Yan Chan	R Zarni
1	Aye Thazin Maung	21	N/A	"Kyin Nar Chin Loon Lo"	✔	✔	✔	✔
2	Kim Kim	22	N/A	"Ya Par Tal"	✔	–	–	–
3	Myat Noe Thwal	N/A	N/A	"A Chit Kyaunt"	–	–	–	–
4	Harsaylar	23	N/A	"Girl on Fire"	–	–	✔	✔
5	Roi San	17	N/A	"Sin Sar Kya"	–	–	✔	–
6	Pai Soe	24	N/A	"Lay Lwint Chin Lann Ma Myar"	–	✔	✔	–
7	Ester Moon Mai	19	N/A	"I'm Yours"	–	–	–	✔
8	Khine Zang	31	N/A	"Kan Kaung Chin Let Saung"	✔	✔	✔	✔
9	Triz	23	N/A	"A May Thar"	Team full	'✔	✔	✔'

== The Battles ==
The Battle Rounds were broadcast from Sunday, April 7, 2019, to Sunday, May 5, 2019. Season 1 didn't use 'Steal' and this is first season of using the 'Steal'.

Color key:

Artist won the Battle and advanced to the Knockouts
Artist lost the Battle but was stolen by another coach and advanced to the Knockouts
Artist lost the Battle and was eliminated

Episode	Coach	Order	Winner	Song	Loser	'Steal' result			
Episode	Coach	Order	Winner	Song	Loser	Kyar Pauk	Ni Ni Khin Zaw	Yan Yan Chan	R Zarni
Episode 7 (Sunday, April 7, 2019)	R Zarni	1	David Htoo	"Nga Yae Tattoo"	Zin Mar Moe Sett	—	—	✔	—
Episode 7 (Sunday, April 7, 2019)	Yan Yan Chan	2	Grin Go	"Yuu Chin Yaung Saung Ma Nay Nar"	Lynn Khat	—	—	—	✔
Episode 7 (Sunday, April 7, 2019)	Kyar Pauk	3	Khine	"Like I'm Gonna Lose You"	Grace Mami	—	✔	—	—
Episode 7 (Sunday, April 7, 2019)	Ni Ni Khin Zaw	4	Twins Star	"U Ba Nyunt Yae Chit Dotkha" / "Kyar Par Tal Kwar"	Hpong Hpong	—	—	—	—
Episode 7 (Sunday, April 7, 2019)	Ni Ni Khin Zaw	5	Tar Tar	"Sanda Ta Sone"	Pai Soe	—	—	—	—
Episode 7 (Sunday, April 7, 2019)	Kyar Pauk	6	Novem Htoo	"A Thone Ma Kya Tae Hnin Si"	Khine Zang	—	—	—	—
Episode 8 (Sunday, April 21, 2019)	R Zarni	1	Harsaylar	"Kyo Pakhat Nite Nyi Twal Chin"	Aung Naing Min	—	—	—	—
Episode 8 (Sunday, April 21, 2019)	Ni Ni Khin Zaw	2	Khoon Wadi Pyae	"Phya Phya Lay Nae Nyeint Nyeint Lay"	Aye Thazin Maung	✔	—	—	—
Episode 8 (Sunday, April 21, 2019)	Yan Yan Chan	3	Yamone Zin Oo	"Let's Go" / "Welcome To The Party"	Triz	—	—	—	—
Episode 8 (Sunday, April 21, 2019)	Kyar Pauk	4	C Ko	"Myit Hna Sin Yae Pin Lal"	Phyo Htet Ko	—	—	—	—
Episode 8 (Sunday, April 21, 2019)	Yan Yan Chan	5	Hein Zaw Lin	"Hnit Theint Tay"	Zayye Paing	—	—	—	—
Episode 8 (Sunday, April 21, 2019)	Ni Ni Khin Zaw	6	Hazel	"Thap Chit Yin Khar Mal"	Melody Khong	—	—	✔	—
Episode 9 (Sunday, April 28, 2019)	R Zarni	1	Pan Pan Kye Mon	"Mee Htae Too Mae A Chit"	A Day	—	✔	—	—
Episode 9 (Sunday, April 28, 2019)	Ni Ni Khin Zaw	2	Nicholas Pasangma	"Ae Thal"	Biko	—	—	—	—
Episode 9 (Sunday, April 28, 2019)	R Zarni	3	Htin Gyi	"Nauk Sone Tha Baw Htar"	Khant Shine	—	—	—	—
Episode 9 (Sunday, April 28, 2019)	Kyar Pauk	4	Kim Kim	"Hollywood (Burmese song)"	Ronnie	—	—	—	—
Episode 9 (Sunday, April 28, 2019)	Kyar Pauk	5	Jadson Fish	"Kyo Nay Say Chin Tal"	Jue Jue	—	—	—	✔
Episode 9 (Sunday, April 28, 2019)	Yan Yan Chan	6	Arkar Aung Khin Win	"Zat Taw Htae Mhar A Lwan Sone"	Yati	—	—	—	—
Episode 10 (Sunday, May 5, 2019)	R Zarni	1	Paul Austin	"You Are the Reason"	Ester Moon Mai	—	—	—	—
Episode 10 (Sunday, May 5, 2019)	Yan Yan Chan	2	Just	"If I Lose Myself"	Lhyan Wai Myat	—	—	—	—
Episode 10 (Sunday, May 5, 2019)	Ni Ni Khin Zaw	3	Sai Thein Kha Aung	"Yin Khwin Nan Taw"	Thunn	—	—	—	—
Episode 10 (Sunday, May 5, 2019)	Yan Yan Chan	4	Solomon King	"Hallelujah (Pentatonix)"	Roi San	—	—	—	—
Episode 10 (Sunday, May 5, 2019)	R Zarni	5	June Rose	"Sone Ma"	Oram	✔	—	—	—
Episode 10 (Sunday, May 5, 2019)	Kyar Pauk	6	Nyo Mie Mie Htun	"Judi"	Kyal Zin	—	—	—	—

== The Knockouts ==
The Knockout Rounds were broadcast from Sunday, May 12, 2019, to Sunday, May 19, 2019. Season 1 didn't use The Knockouts and this is the first season of The Knockout Round.

Color key:

Artist won the Knockouts and advances to the Live shows
Artist lost the Knockouts and was eliminated

Episode & Date	Coach	Order	Winners	Songs	Losers	Songs
Episode 11 (Sunday, May 12, 2019)	Yan Yan Chan	1	Hein Zaw Lin	"Mu Paing Shin Ma Gyi Ma Ma Kaing"	Zin Mar Moe Sett	"Yan Thu Taw Chauk Par"
Episode 11 (Sunday, May 12, 2019)	Yan Yan Chan	1	Yamone Zin Oo	"A Thae Kwae Ma Nay Nae"	Grin Go	"Alwan Yae Nya"
Episode 11 (Sunday, May 12, 2019)	Kyar Pauk	2	Novem Htoo	"Faint"	Aye Thazin Maung	"Nay Win Thwar Thaw Nan Net Khin"
Episode 11 (Sunday, May 12, 2019)	Kyar Pauk	2	C Ko	"A Maung Htae Ka Thu Sein Myar A Kyaung"	Kim Kim	"A Bal Kyaung So Thaw"
Episode 11 (Sunday, May 12, 2019)	Ni Ni Khin Zaw	3	Twins Star	"Tee Htwin Phan Sin Yin Twin Mhar"	Khoon Wadi Pyae	"Lay Yin Pyan 2"
Episode 11 (Sunday, May 12, 2019)	Ni Ni Khin Zaw	3	A Day	"Nauk Htat Ma Shi"	Sai Thein Kha Aung	"Maung Khaw Yar Lite Mhar Lar"
Episode 11 (Sunday, May 12, 2019)	R Zarni	4	Pan Pan Kye Mon	"Dotkha Myit"	Harsaylar	"Law Ka Hin Lin Pyin"
Episode 11 (Sunday, May 12, 2019)	R Zarni	4	David Htoo	"Nan Kaung Lay Atwat"	Jue Jue	"A Thae Kwae Nya Nay Khin"
Episode 12 (Sunday, May 19, 2019)	Yan Yan Chan	1	Solomon King	"Say"	Arkar Aung Khin Win	"Bal Lo Lote Ya Ma Lae"
Episode 12 (Sunday, May 19, 2019)	Yan Yan Chan	1	Melody Khong	"Where Have You Been"	Just	"Eyes, Nose, Lips"
Episode 12 (Sunday, May 19, 2019)	Ni Ni Khin Zaw	2	Nicholas Pasangma	"Pyan Lar Pyi"	Grace Mami	"A Chit Acid"
Episode 12 (Sunday, May 19, 2019)	Ni Ni Khin Zaw	2	Hazel	"Moe Yay Sat Myar"	Tar Tar	"Thate Paing Tae Min"
Episode 12 (Sunday, May 19, 2019)	R Zarni	3	Paul Austin	"Nauk Sone Yin Khwin"	Htin Gyi	"Tuition Lay Kar Yin"
Episode 12 (Sunday, May 19, 2019)	R Zarni	3	Lynn Khat	"Ta Nay Sar A Lwae Myar"	June Rose	"A Thae Kwae A Htain A Mat"
Episode 12 (Sunday, May 19, 2019)	Kyar Pauk	4	Judson Fish	"This Love"	Oram	"Yin Khone Than A Yin Nee Sone"
Episode 12 (Sunday, May 19, 2019)	Kyar Pauk	4	Nyo Mie Mie Htun	"Toxic"	Khine	"Nar Yee Paw Ka Myet Yay Sat Myar"

== Live shows ==
The live shows were aired on May 26.

Color key

Artist was saved by Public's vote
Artist was saved by his/her coach
Artist was eliminated

=== Week 1: 1st Live shows (May.26) ===
Date	Order	Coach	Artist	Song	Result
Episode 13 (Sunday, May 26, 2019)	1	Ni Ni Khin Zaw	A Day	"Uptown Funk"	Eliminated
Episode 13 (Sunday, May 26, 2019)	2	Ni Ni Khin Zaw	Hazel	"Bone"	Ni Ni's choice
Episode 13 (Sunday, May 26, 2019)	3	Ni Ni Khin Zaw	Nicholas Pasangma	"Shallow"	Public's vote
Episode 13 (Sunday, May 26, 2019)	4	Ni Ni Khin Zaw	Twins Star	"Honey"	Eliminated
Episode 13 (Sunday, May 26, 2019)	5	Kyar Pauk	C Ko	"So Cold"	Eliminated
Episode 13 (Sunday, May 26, 2019)	6	Kyar Pauk	Judson Fish	"A Maw Pyay"	Eliminated
Episode 13 (Sunday, May 26, 2019)	7	Kyar Pauk	Novem Htoo	"Wait and Bleed"	Public's vote
Episode 13 (Sunday, May 26, 2019)	8	Kyar Pauk	Nyo Mie Mie Htun	"Nga Yae La Min"	KP's choice

=== Week 2: 2nd Live shows (June.2) ===
Date	Order	Coach	Artist	Song	Result
Episode 14 (Sunday, June 2, 2019)	1	Yan Yan Chan	Solomon King	"Unchained Melody"	Public's vote
Episode 14 (Sunday, June 2, 2019)	2	Yan Yan Chan	Hein Zaw Lin	"Chit Nay Pho"	Eliminated
Episode 14 (Sunday, June 2, 2019)	3	Yan Yan Chan	Melody Khong	"The Old You"	YC's choice
Episode 14 (Sunday, June 2, 2019)	4	Yan Yan Chan	Yamone Zin Oo	"Hta Min Sar Yay Thauk"	Eliminated
Episode 14 (Sunday, June 2, 2019)	5	R Zarni	David Htoo	"Hsu Lat"	Eliminated
Episode 14 (Sunday, June 2, 2019)	6	R Zarni	Lynn Khat	"A Phay Sakar"	Public's vote
Episode 14 (Sunday, June 2, 2019)	7	R Zarni	Pan Pan Kye Mon	"A Soon Yauk Chit Tat Khae Thaw 2"	Eliminated
Episode 14 (Sunday, June 2, 2019)	8	R Zarni	Paul Austin	"Lann Khwae"	R Gyi's choice

=== Week 3: Live shows semi-finals (June.9) ===
Date	Order	Coach	Artist	Song	Coach points	Public points	Result
Episode 15 (Sunday, June 9, 2019)	1	Yan Yan Chan	Solomon King	"Hsu Taung"	N/A	N/A	Eliminated
Episode 15 (Sunday, June 9, 2019)	2	Yan Yan Chan	Melody Khong	"Kho Hlone Yar"	N/A	N/A	Advanced to Finals
Episode 15 (Sunday, June 9, 2019)	3	R Zarni	Paul Austin	"Fight Song"	N/A	N/A	Advanced to Finals
Episode 15 (Sunday, June 9, 2019)	4	R Zarni	Lynn Khat	"A Linn Saing Yae Tha Chin"	N/A	N/A	Eliminated
Episode 15 (Sunday, June 9, 2019)	5	Ni Ni Khin Zaw	Hazel	"Khayay Lann Diary"	N/A	N/A	Advanced to Finals
Episode 15 (Sunday, June 9, 2019)	6	Ni Ni Khin Zaw	Nicholas Pasangma	"Shwe Pin Lal"	N/A	N/A	Eliminated
Episode 15 (Sunday, June 9, 2019)	7	Kyar Pauk	Novem Htoo	"Khin Byar Yae A Kyaung"	N/A	N/A	Advanced to Finals
Episode 15 (Sunday, June 9, 2019)	8	Kyar Pauk	Nyo Mie Mie Htun	"Ma Nyi Mya Chin"	N/A	N/A	Eliminated

=== Week 4: Finale (June.16) ===
Date	Coach	Artist	Order	Solo song	Order	Duet with coach	Result
Episode 16 (last episode) (Sunday, June 16, 2019)	Ni Ni Khin Zaw	Hazel	1	"Ta Kyawt Hna Kyawt Tay Ko Thi"	7	"Titanium"	Runner-up
Episode 16 (last episode) (Sunday, June 16, 2019)	Kyar Pauk	Novem Htoo	2	"Nauk Kyaw"	5	"Telepunk"	Winner
Episode 16 (last episode) (Sunday, June 16, 2019)	Yan Yan Chan	Melody Khong	3	"Jatsin Htake Ka La Yake Pyar"	6	"A Sate Einmet"	Runner-up
Episode 16 (last episode) (Sunday, June 16, 2019)	R Zarni	Paul Austin	4	"Thakhin"	8	"Fool Again" / "Gandawin See Sar"	Runner-up
