= The Voice Myanmar season 3 =

Burmese reality talent show

The Voice Myanmar
- Season 3
- Hosted by: Tayzar Kyaw
- Judges: Kyar Pauk; Ni Ni Khin Zaw; Yan Yan Chan; R Zarni
- Winner: N Oo L
- Winning coach: R Zarni

Release
- Original network: MRTV-4
- Original release: August 23 – December 20, 2020

Season chronology
- ← Previous; Season 2

The third season of Burmese reality talent show The Voice Myanmar premiered on August 23, 2020 on MRTV-4. Kyar Pauk, Ni Ni Khin Zaw, Yan Yan Chan and R Zarni continued as coaches for this season.

== Blind auditions ==
The first episode of the Blind auditions premiered on August 23, 2020.

Color key

✔	Coach hit his/her "I WANT YOU" button
	Artist defaulted to this coach's team
	Artist elected to join this coach's team
	Artist eliminated with no coach pressing his or her "I WANT YOU" button

=== Episode 1 (Aug. 23) ===
Order	Artist	Age	Hometown	Song	Coach's and artist's choices			
Order	Artist	Age	Hometown	Song	Kyar Pauk	Ni Ni Khin Zaw	Yan Yan Chan	R Zarni
1	Annie	20	Yangon	"Min Ma Shi Tae Nauk"	✔	✔	✔	–
2	Change	23	Yangon	"Tennessee Whiskey"	–	✔	–	–
3	Cherry Nan	21	Taunggyi	"Hna Lone Thway"	–	–	–	–
4	Nay Chi Moe Oo	26	Yangon	"Kyun Ma"	✔	–	✔	–
5	B Litt	20	Pyin Oo Lwin	"Kaw La Har La"	–	–	–	–
6	Naw Pyae Sone Aye Kyu	23	Yangon	"Psychosocial"	✔	✔	–	✔
7	Wai Yan Htun	28	Myitkyina	"Thu Sein Ta Yauk"	–	–	–	–
8	Janus	28	Loikaw	"Strangers in the Night"	–	✔	–	✔
9	Pan	25	Mandalay	"Oh My Beloved Father"	✔	✔	✔	✔
10	Phyone Tee	32	Mawlamyinegyun	"Lwan Tae Sate"	–	–	✔	–
11	Shwe Hmone	26	Magway	"Cigarettes"	✔	✔	–	✔

=== Episode 2 (Aug. 30) ===
Order	Artist	Age	Hometown	Song	Coach's and artist's choices			
Order	Artist	Age	Hometown	Song	Kyar Pauk	Ni Ni Khin Zaw	Yan Yan Chan	R Zarni
1	Khine Thadar Seint	21	Yangon	"A Chit Mee"	–	✔	–	–
2	Lin Myaing	31	Yangon	"Chit Taing Lae A Nyar"	✔	✔	–	–
3	Kay Zin Min Htun	18	Hinthada	"Friends"	–	–	–	–
4	Ko Htike	36	Mandalay	"Min Yet Set Tal"	✔	–	✔	–
5	Chocolate	25	Nyaung Shwe	"A Shay Ta Kar A Win"	–	–	–	–
6	Aung Paing Thu Naing	26	Dawei	"Still Loving You"	✔	–	–	✔
7	Khin Yadanar Soe	20	Bago	"Nge Kywan Swe"	✔	✔	✔	✔
8	Jonathan Tang Shing	18	Yangon	"Best Part"	–	–	–	–
9	Thin Yu	16	Yangon	"Let Let Ko Hta Lo"	–	–	✔	✔
10	Mhyar Htet	29	Bago	"Khit Haung Min Thar Gyi"	–	–	–	–
11	Linn Wai	28	Yangon	"A Chit Nite Kya Sone Chin"	–	–	✔	–
12	Htet Gyin	27	Myingyan	"Chit Thu Let Saung"	–	✔	–	–
13	Ni Htoo	29	Gangaw	"Eain Pyan Po Pay Par"	–	✔	–	–

=== Episode 3 (Sep. 6) ===
Order	Artist	Age	Hometown	Song	Coach's and artist's choices			
Order	Artist	Age	Hometown	Song	Kyar Pauk	Ni Ni Khin Zaw	Yan Yan Chan	R Zarni
1	Htike Gyi	33	Yangon	"A Thone Ma Kya Tae Hnin Si"	–	✔	–	✔
2	T Kar	31	Yangon	"A Mone"	–	✔	–	–
3	Su May Po Thet	34	Pathein	"D Ka Saunt Nay Thu"	–	–	–	–
4	Shwe Thway	21	Yangon	"Dear Mama"	✔	–	✔	✔
5	Nwai 9	24	Yangon	"Judi"	✔	–	–	–
6	Kaung Htet San	17	Yangon	"Wut Kyway"	–	–	–	–
7	Ze Ze Rca	35	Mawlamyine	"A Tate Myet Khin"	–	–	–	–
8	Thiri Hnin Eain	26	Yangon	"All I Ask"	✔	✔	–	✔
9	La Wun Ko Ko	25	Taunggyi	"Ko Nar Shi Say Chin"	–	–	–	–
10	Han So Ree	24	Yangon	"Lalala"	–	–	✔	–
11	Ei Thazin Kyaw	19	Yangon	"Pyan Sone Chin Tar Pae Thi Tar Par"	–	–	–	–
12	Ye Khant	27	Taungdwingyi	"Nhyoe Thaw Pin Lal Swae Ngin Thaw La Min"	✔	✔	✔	✔

Non-competition performance
Order	Performer	Song
1	Yuzana	"Padipatkha"

=== Episode 4 (Sep. 13) ===
Order	Artist	Age	Hometown	Song	Coach's and artist's choices			
Order	Artist	Age	Hometown	Song	Kyar Pauk	Ni Ni Khin Zaw	Yan Yan Chan	R Zarni
1	N Oo L	26	Pyay	"A May Yae Dotkha Ao Lay"	✔	✔	–	✔
2	Khin La Pyae Wun	24	Yangon	"A Chit Phit Lwan Say"	–	–	–	–
3	Aung Kaung Khant	20	Danubyu	"A Chit Sone Lo"	✔	✔	–	✔
4	Japan Gyi	23	Kalay	"Nga Bawa"	✔	✔	✔	✔
5	Moe Thar	26	Kyangin	"See Ta Phet Char"	–	–	✔	–
6	Salai T Lian	30	Kalay	"Ye Ye Yat Ti"	–	–	–	✔
7	Lin Lett Shwe Yee	21	Mawlamyinegyun	"Aung Myin Mu Yae Nauk Kwal"	–	–	–	–
8	Toe Gyii	26	Yangon	"Ta Khar Tone Ka"	✔	✔	✔	✔
9	Sein June	30	Yangon	"Tike Pwal"	–	–	–	✔
10	Cho Wathan	22	Mandalay	"Speechless (Naomi Scott)"	–	–	–	–
11	Micheal	31	Namhkam, Shan State	"Yet Sat Swar Pyone Tat Thaw"	–	–	–	–
12	Naw Jar Lay	26	Tachileik	"Ma Chit Buu Ma Pyaw Par Nae"	✔	–	✔	–

=== Episode 5 (Sep. 20) ===
Order	Artist	Age	Hometown	Song	Coach's and artist's choices			
Order	Artist	Age	Hometown	Song	Kyar Pauk	Ni Ni Khin Zaw	Yan Yan Chan	R Zarni
1	May Myat Noe Khine	18	Yangon	"Say"	–	✔	✔	✔
2	Zorina	22	Falam	"Don't Watch Me Cry"	✔	–	–	–
3	Jacob	20	Yangon	"Let Khan Pyee Thar"	–	–	–	–
4	Thet Htar Myo Han	26	Yangon	"Perfect"	–	–	–	–
5	Zaw Khun	29	Yangon	"Ma Tway Khae Kya Yin"	–	✔	–	✔
6	Nway Oo	27	Yangon	"Thachin Mae Guitar"	–	–	–	✔
7	Se Se Phyu	34	Myitkyina	"Po Chit Naing Ma Lar"	–	–	–	–
8	Ba Wa	27	Pyin Oo Lwin	"No Woman No Cry"	✔	✔	✔	✔
9	Gu Gu	25	Taunggyi	"Zat Taw Htae Mhar Alwan Sone"	–	–	–	–
10	Naw Zarli	28	Bilin, Mon State	"Hero"	–	✔	–	✔
11	Venice Rock	39	Yangon	"Par Pyin Paw Mha Nay Swae Myar"	–	–	–	–
12	IV Htoo	37	Yangon	"What Are Words"	–	–	✔	–
13	Su Pyae Wai Shan	24	Yangon	"Moe Khar Yay"	–	–	–	–
14	Saw Kyaw Thura Min	24	Maubin	"Su Taung Mal"	✔	✔	–	–

=== Episode 6 (Sep. 27) ===
Order	Artist	Age	Hometown	Song	Coach's and artist's choices			
Order	Artist	Age	Hometown	Song	Kyar Pauk	Ni Ni Khin Zaw	Yan Yan Chan	R Zarni
1	Aung Pi	23	Falam, Myanmar	"When I Was Your Man"	✔	✔	–	✔
2	Su Mon	33	Pyin Oo Lwin	"Cherry Myo"	–	✔	–	✔
3	Shine Htet	23	Pyay	"A Mone Myet Lone"	–	–	–	–
4	G	20	Yangon	"It Will Rain"	–	✔	–	–
4	Yan Myo	26	Mae Sot	"Parr Parr Lay Par"	–	✔	–	–
5	May Si	31	Pyay	"Thap Chit Yin Khar Mal"	–	–	–	–
6	Twan Pee	22	Kalay	"Run Free"	✔	✔	✔	✔
7	Thoon Eain	19	Myanaung	"Ko Atwat Einmet Min Met Lar"	Team full	–	–	–
8	Error	20	Labutta, Myaungmya	"Ma Ngo Par Nae Tot"	Team full	–	✔	✔
9	Jen Jeng	23	Yangon	"Sate Kuu Taung Pan Myar"	Team full	✔	✔	Team full
10	Z Angel Seng	20	Mong Hsu	"Flashlight"	Team full	–	Team full	Team full
11	Saw Pho Pho	29	Hlaingbwe	"A Chit Oo Zat Lann"	Team full	–	Team full	Team full
12	Zar Ni	39	Mandalay	"Lo Tha Lo Thone"	Team full	✔	Team full	Team full

== The Battles ==
The Battle Rounds were broadcast from Sunday, October 4, 2020, to Sunday, November 1, 2020.

Color key:

Artist won the Battle and advanced to the Knockouts
Artist lost the Battle but was stolen by another coach and advanced to the Knockouts
Artist lost the Battle and was eliminated

Episode	Coach	Order	Winner	Song	Loser	'Steal' result			
Episode	Coach	Order	Winner	Song	Loser	Kyar Pauk	Ni Ni Khin Zaw	Yan Yan Chan	R Zarni
Episode 7 (Sunday, October 4, 2020)	R Zarni	1	Naw Zarli	"Kyal Tway Sone Tae Nya"	Ye Khant	—	—	—	—
Episode 7 (Sunday, October 4, 2020)	Kyar Pauk	2	Ba Wa	"Khin Lay Sein Tal"	Ko Htike	—	—	—	—
Episode 7 (Sunday, October 4, 2020)	Ni Ni Khin Zaw	3	Zaw Khun	"Nga Yae La Min"	Zar Ni	—	—	—	✔
Episode 7 (Sunday, October 4, 2020)	Yan Yan Chan	4	Jen Jeng	"Sanay Mhar Ywar Tae Moe"	Phyone Tee	—	—	—	—
Episode 7 (Sunday, October 4, 2020)	Kyar Pauk	5	Lin Myaing	"Let It Be"	Annie	—	—	—	—
Episode 7 (Sunday, October 4, 2020)	R Zarni	6	Janus	"A Thone Ma Kya Tae Hnin Si"	Naw Pyae Sone Aye Kyu	—	✔	—	—
Episode 8 (Sunday, October 11, 2020)	Kyar Pauk	1	Twan Pee	"Eain Ko Pyan Khae Taw"	Japan Gyi	—	—	✔	—
Episode 8 (Sunday, October 11, 2020)	Yan Yan Chan	2	Thin Yu	Rap Battle	Han So Ree	—	—	—	—
Episode 8 (Sunday, October 11, 2020)	R Zarni	3	Htike Gyi	"Di Yay Di Lay"	Sein June	—	—	—	—
Episode 8 (Sunday, October 11, 2020)	Yan Yan Chan	4	IV Htoo	"Taung Pan Myar Hnint"	May Myat Noe Khine	—	—	—	—
Episode 8 (Sunday, October 11, 2020)	Ni Ni Khin Zaw	5	Khin Yadanar Soe	"Lann Sett Shauk Mal"	Khine Thadar Seint	✔	—	—	—
Episode 9 (Sunday, October 18, 2020)	Yan Yan Chan	1	Error	Rap Battle	Shwe Thway	✔	—	—	—
Episode 9 (Sunday, October 18, 2020)	R Zarni	2	Nway Oo	"Min Lay Thi Pho"	Aung Pi	—	—	—	—
Episode 9 (Sunday, October 18, 2020)	Ni Ni Khin Zaw	3	Pan	"Pha Yar Pay Tae Su"	Ni Htoo	—	—	—	—
Episode 9 (Sunday, October 18, 2020)	Kyar Pauk	4	Thiri Hnin Eain	"Way Thar Lae"	Nwai 9	—	—	—	—
Episode 10 (Sunday, October 25, 2020)	R Zarni	1	N Oo L	"Ta Nal Si Khwae Naing Ma Lar"	Su Mon	—	—	✔	—
Episode 10 (Sunday, October 25, 2020)	Ni Ni Khin Zaw	2	Htet Gyin	"Chan Khae"	Change	—	—	—	—
Episode 10 (Sunday, October 25, 2020)	Kyar Pauk	3	Toe Gyii	"Moe Tain Kabyar"	Zorina	—	—	—	—
Episode 10 (Sunday, October 25, 2020)	Yan Yan Chan	4	Moe Thar	"Ta Ko Yay Lwan Sut Mu"	Linn Wai	—	—	—	—
Episode 10 (Sunday, October 25, 2020)	R Zarni	5	Salai T Lian	"Yin Khone Than A Yin Nee Sone"	Aung Paing Thu Naing	—	—	—	—
Episode 11 (Sunday, November 1, 2020)	Yan Yan Chan	1	Naw Jar Lay	"Ma Sone Tae Tha Chin"	Nay Chi Moe Oo	—	—	—	—
Episode 11 (Sunday, November 1, 2020)	Ni Ni Khin Zaw	2	Saw Kyaw Thura Min	"Wut Kyway"	Yan Myo	—	—	—	—
Episode 11 (Sunday, November 1, 2020)	Kyar Pauk	3	Aung Kaung Khant	"Saung Einmet"	Shwe Hmone	—	✔	—	✔
Episode 11 (Sunday, November 1, 2020)	Ni Ni Khin Zaw	4	T Kar	"Feeling Good (Michael Bublé)"	G	—	—	—	✔

== The Knockouts ==
The Knockout Rounds were broadcast from Sunday, November 8, 2020, to Sunday, November 22, 2020.

Color key:

Artist won the Knockouts and advances to the Live shows
Artist lost the Knockouts and was eliminated

Episode & Date	Coach	Order	Winners	Songs	Losers	Songs
Episode 12 (Sunday, November 8, 2020)	Ni Ni Khin Zaw	1	Htet Gyin	"Min Pyan Khae Par"	T Kar	"Hnin Kyit Tha Lo Lote Par"
Episode 12 (Sunday, November 8, 2020)	Ni Ni Khin Zaw	1	Zaw Khun	"Ngo Nay Tar Thi Lar"	Shwe Hmone	"Alwan Nya Hay Man"
Episode 12 (Sunday, November 8, 2020)	Yan Yan Chan	2	Error	"Ngar Mhan Tal"	Thin Yu	"Dance"
Episode 12 (Sunday, November 8, 2020)	Yan Yan Chan	2	IV Htoo	"We Will Rock You" / "Ta Khar Ka Rock 'n' Roll"	Su Mon	"A Chit Dan"
Episode 12 (Sunday, November 8, 2020)	R Zarni	3	N Oo L	"Your Man"	G	"Hsu Lat"
Episode 12 (Sunday, November 8, 2020)	R Zarni	3	Salai T Lian	"Stage Show Bayinma"	Htike Gyi	"Ko Yae Bayinma"
Episode 13 (Sunday, November 15, 2020)	Kyar Pauk	1	Twan Pee	"Lose Yourself"	Toe Gyii	"War and Peace"
Episode 13 (Sunday, November 15, 2020)	Kyar Pauk	1	Ba Wa	"Dotkha Yauk Pyi"	Khine Thadar Seint	"Zombie"
Episode 13 (Sunday, November 15, 2020)	Ni Ni Khin Zaw	2	Pan	"The Phantom of the Opera"	Saw Kyaw Thura Min	"A Mat Ta Ya Lann Ka Lay"
Episode 13 (Sunday, November 15, 2020)	Ni Ni Khin Zaw	2	Khin Yadanar Soe	"Bal Yee Sar Ko A Chit Sone Lae"	Naw Pyae Sone Aye Kyu	"Bad Guy"
Episode 14 (Sunday, November 22, 2020)	Yan Yan Chan	1	Jen Jeng	"Believer"	Naw Jar Lay	"Pauk Nay Pyi"
Episode 14 (Sunday, November 22, 2020)	Yan Yan Chan	1	Moe Thar	"Ta Yar Khwin"	Japan Gyi	"Dutaya A Kyain Lwint Myaw"
Episode 14 (Sunday, November 22, 2020)	R Zarni	2	Naw Zarli	"Lay Lwint Lu"	Zar Ni	"Myaing Nan San Pan Ta Pwint"
Episode 14 (Sunday, November 22, 2020)	R Zarni	2	Janus	"Go To The Distance"	Nway Oo	"A Htee Kyan Witnyin"
Episode 14 (Sunday, November 22, 2020)	Kyar Pauk	3	Shwe Thway	"Ay...Ao"	Lin Myaing	"A Thae Kwae Pone Pyin"
Episode 14 (Sunday, November 22, 2020)	Kyar Pauk	3	Aung Kaung Khant	"Sein Yet Lay Arr"	Thiri Hnin Eain	"Price Tag"

== Live shows ==
The live shows were aired on November 29.

Color key

Artist was saved by Public's vote
Artist was saved by his/her coach
Artist was eliminated

=== Week 1: 1st Live show (Nov.29) ===
Date	Order	Coach	Artist	Song	Result
Episode 15 (Sunday, November 29, 2020)	1	Ni Ni Khin Zaw	Pan	"A Thel Kwae Thu"	Ni Ni's choice
Episode 15 (Sunday, November 29, 2020)	2	Ni Ni Khin Zaw	Htet Gyin	"That Htu Yae Myit Phyar"	Eliminated
Episode 15 (Sunday, November 29, 2020)	3	Ni Ni Khin Zaw	Khin Yadanar Soe	"A Hnaung A Phwae"	Public's vote
Episode 15 (Sunday, November 29, 2020)	4	Ni Ni Khin Zaw	Zaw Khun	"A Chit Hsue Lay Sue Nay Tone Pae"	Eliminated
Episode 15 (Sunday, November 29, 2020)	5	R Zarni	Salai T Lian	"Tha Ti"	R Gyi's choice
Episode 15 (Sunday, November 29, 2020)	6	R Zarni	Naw Zarli	"Shwe Taung Pan"	Eliminated
Episode 15 (Sunday, November 29, 2020)	7	R Zarni	Janus	"Nar Lal Pay Par Kalay Yal"	Eliminated
Episode 15 (Sunday, November 29, 2020)	8	R Zarni	N Oo L	"Hmone Shwe Yee Zat Lann"	Public's vote

=== Week 2: 2nd Live show (Dec.6) ===
Date	Order	Coach	Artist	Song	Result
Episode 16 (Sunday, December 6, 2020)	1	Yan Yan Chan	IV Htoo	"A Sate Khwat"	Public's vote
Episode 16 (Sunday, December 6, 2020)	2	Yan Yan Chan	Jen Jeng	"365"	Eliminated
Episode 16 (Sunday, December 6, 2020)	3	Yan Yan Chan	Error	"A Thet Khyaut Sal Laut Hti Lwint"	YC's choice
Episode 16 (Sunday, December 6, 2020)	4	Yan Yan Chan	Moe Thar	"Gabar Thar"	Eliminated
Episode 16 (Sunday, December 6, 2020)	5	Kyar Pauk	Aung Kaung Khant	"A Maint"	Eliminated
Episode 16 (Sunday, December 6, 2020)	6	Kyar Pauk	Twan Pee	"A Hlae"	KP's choice
Episode 16 (Sunday, December 6, 2020)	7	Kyar Pauk	Ba Wa	"Tha Kaung Htet Net Tae Nya"	Public's vote
Episode 16 (Sunday, December 6, 2020)	8	Kyar Pauk	Shwe Thway	"BEEF"	Eliminated

=== Week 3: Live show semi-finals (Dec.13) ===
Date	Order	Coach	Artist	Song	Coach points	Public points	Result
Episode 17 (Sunday, December 13, 2020)	1	Kyar Pauk	Ba Wa	"A Pyar Yaung Coffee Shop"	N/A	N/A	Eliminated
Episode 17 (Sunday, December 13, 2020)	2	Kyar Pauk	Twan Pee	"A Sein Yaung Sar Su"	N/A	N/A	Advanced to Finals
Episode 17 (Sunday, December 13, 2020)	3	Ni Ni Khin Zaw	Pan	"Skyfall"	N/A	N/A	Eliminated
Episode 17 (Sunday, December 13, 2020)	4	Ni Ni Khin Zaw	Khin Yadanar Soe	"Saung Kyar Chi"	N/A	N/A	Advanced to Finals
Episode 17 (Sunday, December 13, 2020)	5	Yan Yan Chan	IV Htoo	"Thit Pin"	N/A	N/A	Eliminated
Episode 17 (Sunday, December 13, 2020)	6	Yan Yan Chan	Error	"Heavy Weight"	N/A	N/A	Advanced to Finals
Episode 17 (Sunday, December 13, 2020)	7	R Zarni	N Oo L	"Myaw Lint Chin Kwin Pyin"	N/A	N/A	Advanced to Finals
Episode 17 (Sunday, December 13, 2020)	8	R Zarni	Salai T Lian	"Tain Lo A Chit"	N/A	N/A	Eliminated

Non-competition performance
Order	Performer	Song	Note
1	Zaw Win Htut	"Paris Myo Ko Pyan Yu Thwar"	Recorded

=== Week 4: Finale (Dec.20) ===
Date	Coach	Artist	Order	Solo song	Order	Duet with coach	Result
Episode 18 (last episode) (Sunday, December 20, 2020)	Yan Yan Chan	Error	1	"This is the rap"	8	"Myetlone Myar Phwint Kyi"	Runners-up
Episode 18 (last episode) (Sunday, December 20, 2020)	Kyar Pauk	Twan Pee	2	"Einmet + Shadow of the day"	5	"Body Bags"	Runners-up
Episode 18 (last episode) (Sunday, December 20, 2020)	Ni Ni Khin Zaw	Khin Yadanar Soe	3	"Naga Ni"	7	"Myint Mo Htet Myint Thaw"	Runners-up
Episode 18 (last episode) (Sunday, December 20, 2020)	R Zarni	N Oo L	4	"Kha Yee Thwar Mee Kho Tan Myar"	6	"Platform Min Thar"	Winner

Non-competition performance
Order	Performer	Song	Note
1	Novem Htoo	"This is war"	Recorded
2	Ringo	"A Chit Kyaunt", "Yay Sone Mhyaw Lite Pyi"	Live
