= The Voice Myanmar season 1 =

Burmese reality talent show

The Voice Myanmar
- Season 1
- Hosted by: Tayzar Kyaw
- Judges: Kyar Pauk; Ni Ni Khin Zaw; Yan Yan Chan; Lynn Lynn
- Winner: Ngwe Soe
- Winning coach: Lynn Lynn

Release
- Original network: MRTV-4
- Original release: February 18 – June 3, 2018

Season chronology
- Next → Season 2

The first season of Burmese reality talent show The Voice Myanmar premiered on February 18, 2018 on MRTV-4. Kyar Pauk, Ni Ni Khin Zaw, Yan Yan Chan and Lynn Lynn were coaches for this season.

== Blind auditions ==
The first episode of the Blind auditions premiered on February 18, 2018.

Color key

✔	Coach hit his/her "I WANT YOU" button
	Artist defaulted to this coach's team
	Artist elected to join this coach's team
	Artist eliminated with no coach pressing his or her "I WANT YOU" button

=== Episode 1 (Feb. 18) ===
Order	Artist	Age	Hometown	Song	Coach's and artist's choices			
Order	Artist	Age	Hometown	Song	Kyar Pauk	Ni Ni Khin Zaw	Yan Yan Chan	Lynn Lynn
1	Ba Wa	26	N/A	"Ko Saunt Nat"	✔	✔	✔	–
2	Christina BLY	N/A	N/A	"Wrecking Ball"	–	–	–	–
3	Tsaw Tsaw	24	N/A	"Chit Oo May"	✔	–	–	–
4	Andrew	22	N/A	"Pyit Tat Par Tal"	–	✔	–	✔
5	Thet Noe Wai	25	N/A	"Lwint Nay Pyi"	✔	✔	✔	–
6	Julia Htay	28	N/A	"Thi Chin Let Saung"	–	–	✔	–
7	Htoo Aung Ko	N/A	N/A	"All By Myself"	–	–	–	–
8	Sandy	25	N/A	"Mama Do"	✔	✔	✔	–
9	Hnin Eindray Shin	19	N/A	"Think Of Me"	✔	✔	✔	✔

=== Episode 2 (Feb. 25) ===
Order	Artist	Age	Hometown	Song	Coach's and artist's choices			
Order	Artist	Age	Hometown	Song	Kyar Pauk	Ni Ni Khin Zaw	Yan Yan Chan	Lynn Lynn
1	Susan Aye	24	N/A	"Zat Kaung"	✔	✔	✔	✔
2	Naw Htee Phaw Saw	N/A	N/A	"Thu Sein"	–	–	–	–
3	Yoe Yoe	26	N/A	"Perfect"	✔	✔	–	✔
4	Aung Zin Phyo	29	N/A	"Sanda Tha Sone"	–	✔	–	✔
5	Ip Shen Paung	28	N/A	"Runaway Baby"	✔	–	–	✔
6	Hlaing Myo Thu	32	N/A	"I Will Always Love You"	–	✔	–	–
7	Khaing Myae Thit Sar	25	N/A	"Stand By Me"	–	–	✔	–
8	Oishi	21	N/A	"Shape of You"	✔	✔	✔	–
9	Phyo Hay Mar Oo	28	N/A	"A Kyin Nar Einmet"	✔	✔	✔	–
10	Htet Htet Myint Aung	N/A	N/A	"Thap Thap Kalay Kyay Kwae"	–	–	–	–

=== Episode 3 (Mar. 4) ===
Order	Artist	Age	Hometown	Song	Coach's and artist's choices			
Order	Artist	Age	Hometown	Song	Kyar Pauk	Ni Ni Khin Zaw	Yan Yan Chan	Lynn Lynn
1	Ye Naing Htoo	27	N/A	"Green, Green Grass of Home"	✔	–	✔	✔
2	C Htam Zi	N/A	N/A	"Myaw Lint Yin"	–	–	–	–
3	Priscilla Htike	19	N/A	"Bang Bang"	–	–	✔	✔
4	Zaw Ye Naing	19	N/A	"Stop"	–	✔	–	–
5	Pyae Say Maung	35	N/A	"Htwat Pauk"	✔	✔	✔	✔
6	Zaw Htun	N/A	N/A	"Ma May Naing Buu"	–	–	–	–
7	Thura Ko	N/A	N/A	"Dutaya A Kyain Hlwint Myaw"	–	–	–	–
8	Jason Ace	22	N/A	"Lwal Lwal Lay Ya Khae Taw"	✔	✔	–	–
9	Sai N	31	N/A	"Wut Kyway"	–	–	✔	–
10	Wai Wai Hlaing Oo	26	N/A	"Moe Khar Yay"	✔	–	–	–
11	Zaw Ye Naing	N/A	N/A	"Stop"	–	–	–	–

=== Episode 4 (Mar. 11) ===
Order	Artist	Age	Hometown	Song	Coach's and artist's choices			
Order	Artist	Age	Hometown	Song	Kyar Pauk	Ni Ni Khin Zaw	Yan Yan Chan	Lynn Lynn
1	Woofer	27	N/A	"Dar Min Ba Wa"	✔	✔	✔	✔
2	Aww Aww	27	N/A	"Lann Khwae"	–	–	–	✔
3	Ce Ce	26	N/A	"Cherry Myo"	–	–	✔	✔
4	Jawa Aung Moon	26	N/A	"See Tha Phet Char"	✔	✔	–	–
5	Jennet Pari	26	N/A	"Blank Space"	–	–	✔	–
6	Thet Htar Su	19	N/A	"Kyun Ma"	–	✔	–	–
7	Waii Ryan	25	N/A	"Angel Tayaw"	✔	–	–	–
8	Saw Thaw Htoo	N/A	N/A	"A Thae Kwae Thu"	–	–	–	–
9	Wai Hnin Maung	24	N/A	"Bad Boy"	✔	✔	✔	–
10	Thet Htar Su	N/A	N/A	"Kyun Ma"	–	–	–	–

=== Episode 5 (Mar. 18) ===
Order	Artist	Age	Hometown	Song	Coach's and artist's choices			
Order	Artist	Age	Hometown	Song	Kyar Pauk	Ni Ni Khin Zaw	Yan Yan Chan	Lynn Lynn
1	Zaw Lay	24	N/A	"Way Thwar Lae"	✔	✔	–	–
2	Timmy	26	N/A	"Ma Chit Bu Ma Pyaw Par Nae"	✔	–	–	✔
3	Ngwe Soe	39	N/A	"A Thae Kwae Ae Thal"	–	–	–	✔
4	Aung Gyi	38	N/A	"Kha Yee A Sone Hti"	–	–	–	✔
5	K Gyi	N/A	N/A	"Thay Say Naing Tal"	–	–	–	–
6	Micky	23	N/A	"More Than Words"	–	–	✔	–
7	Keh Keh	31	N/A	"Mhar Pyan Tal"	✔	–	✔	–
8	Jubilee Tun	21	N/A	"The Prayer"	✔	✔	–	–

=== Episode 6 (Mar. 25) ===
Order	Artist	Age	Hometown	Song	Coach's and artist's choices			
Order	Artist	Age	Hometown	Song	Kyar Pauk	Ni Ni Khin Zaw	Yan Yan Chan	Lynn Lynn
1	Nang Zar Chi Lynn	29	N/A	"A Htee Kyan Thu"	✔	✔	✔	✔
2	Wai Hnin Pwint	28	N/A	"Beautiful Girl"	✔	✔	–	–
3	Ryan Htun	28	N/A	"Min Pyan Khae Par"	–	–	–	✔
4	Thaw Di	31	N/A	"Sone Ma"	–	–	✔	–
5	Myet Myet Myo Htet	23	N/A	"Lay Me Down"	✔	–	✔	–
6	Mark Jason	25	N/A	"Love Yourself"	Team full	✔	✔	✔
7	Lito	26	N/A	"Gaung Nae Pann"	Team full	–	✔	–
8	Htar Htar	33	N/A	"Mile Paung Kahtay"	Team full	–	–	✔
9	Grace Monica	19	N/A	"Eyes, Nose, Lips"	Team full	✔	–	✔
10	Eain Linn Naung	27	N/A	"A Chit Khaw Than"	Team full	Team full	✔	✔
11	Hsu Lae Hnin	24	N/A	"Sein Yet Lay Arr"	Team full	Team full	✔	Team full

== The Battles ==
The Battle Rounds were broadcast from Sunday, April 1, 2018, to Sunday, April 22, 2018.

Color key

Artist won the Battle and advances to the Live shows
Artist lost the Battle and was eliminated

Episode & Date	Coach	Order	Winner	Song	Loser
Episode 7 (Sunday, April 1, 2018)	Ni Ni Khin Zaw	1	Wai Hnin Maung	"Havana"	Wai Hnin Pwint
Episode 7 (Sunday, April 1, 2018)	Kyar Pauk	2	Yoe Yoe	"Du Ti Ya Lu"	Tsaw Tsaw
Episode 7 (Sunday, April 1, 2018)	Yan Yan Chan	3	Woofer	"A Mone Myo Thu"	Julia Htay
Episode 7 (Sunday, April 1, 2018)	Ni Ni Khin Zaw	4	Jubilee Tun	"If I Ain't Got You"	Hlaing Myo Thu
Episode 7 (Sunday, April 1, 2018)	Lynn Lynn	5	Ce Ce	"Yin Khwin Pyauk Thu" / "I Will Always Love You"	Ryan Htun
Episode 7 (Sunday, April 1, 2018)	Kyar Pauk	6	Jawa Aung Moon	"Rock 'n' Roll Show"	Waii Ryan
Episode 8 (Sunday, April 8, 2018)	Kyar Pauk	1	Susan Aye	"Accident"	Ba Wa
Episode 8 (Sunday, April 8, 2018)	Lynn Lynn	2	Ip Shen Paung	"Khaw Than"	Aww Aww
Episode 8 (Sunday, April 8, 2018)	Yan Yan Chan	3	Thaw Di	"Halo"	Priscilla Htike
Episode 8 (Sunday, April 8, 2018)	Lynn Lynn	4	Hsu Lae Hnin	"A Yay Pyaw Chin"	Aung Gyi
Episode 8 (Sunday, April 8, 2018)	Yan Yan Chan	5	Oishi	"Don't Let Me Down"	Micky
Episode 8 (Sunday, April 8, 2018)	Ni Ni Khin Zaw	6	Mark Jason	"All Of Me"	Jason Ace
Episode 9 (Sunday, April 15, 2018)	Yan Yan Chan	1	Khaing Myae Thit Sar	"Moe Sat Pwint Lay"	Lito
Episode 9 (Sunday, April 15, 2018)	Kyar Pauk	2	Myet Myet Myo Htet	"Ma Lo Chin Buu Sit"	Keh Keh
Episode 9 (Sunday, April 15, 2018)	Ni Ni Khin Zaw	3	Andrew	"Ngar Kyay Nat Par Tal"	Zaw Lay
Episode 9 (Sunday, April 15, 2018)	Lynn Lynn	4	Nang Zar Chi Lynn	"A War Yaung Lann Ka Lay"	Aung Zin Phyo
Episode 9 (Sunday, April 15, 2018)	Ni Ni Khin Zaw	5	Thet Noe Wai	"Swae Lann Muu Pyet Tha Nar"	Zaw Ye Naing
Episode 9 (Sunday, April 15, 2018)	Lynn Lynn	6	Pyae Say Maung	"Di Lo Lote Lite Par Lar"	Eain Linn Naung
Episode 10 (Sunday, April 22, 2018)	Ni Ni Khin Zaw	1	Grace Monica	"Eain Saunt Thu"	Thet Htar Su
Episode 10 (Sunday, April 22, 2018)	Lynn Lynn	2	Ngwe Soe	"Chit Thu Myar Yae Ma Net Phyan"	Htar Htar
Episode 10 (Sunday, April 22, 2018)	Kyar Pauk	3	Hnin Eindray Shin	"A Shone Htet Po Thaw"	Wai Wai Hlaing Oo
Episode 10 (Sunday, April 22, 2018)	Kyar Pauk	4	Ye Naing Htoo	"Rolling in the Deep"	Timmy
Episode 10 (Sunday, April 22, 2018)	Yan Yan Chan	5	Sandy	"Closer"	Jennet Pari
Episode 10 (Sunday, April 22, 2018)	Yan Yan Chan	6	Sai N	"Sate Kuu Taung Pan Myar"	Phyo Hay Mar Oo

== Live shows ==
The live shows were aired on April 29.

Color key

Artist was saved by Public's vote
Artist was saved by his/her coach
Artist was eliminated

=== Week 1: 1st Live shows (April.29) ===
Date	Order	Coach	Artist	Song	Result
Episode 11 (Sunday, April 29, 2018)	1	Yan Yan Chan	Thaw Di	"Apologize"	YC's Choice
Episode 11 (Sunday, April 29, 2018)	2	Yan Yan Chan	Sai N	"Yuu Tae Angel"	Public's vote
Episode 11 (Sunday, April 29, 2018)	3	Yan Yan Chan	Sandy	"Rockabye"	Eliminated
Episode 11 (Sunday, April 29, 2018)	4	Lynn Lynn	Hsu Lae Hnin	"Sweet Child o' Mine"	Eliminated
Episode 11 (Sunday, April 29, 2018)	5	Lynn Lynn	Ngwe Soe	"Yin Chin Sett Chi Tae Kyo"	Public's vote
Episode 11 (Sunday, April 29, 2018)	6	Lynn Lynn	Ce Ce	"My Heart Will Go On"	Lynn's Choice
Episode 11 (Sunday, April 29, 2018)	7	Ni Ni Khin Zaw	Grace Monica	"Part of Your World"	Public's vote
Episode 11 (Sunday, April 29, 2018)	8	Ni Ni Khin Zaw	Andrew	"Lay Htae Ka Pha Yaung Taing"	Ni Ni's choice
Episode 11 (Sunday, April 29, 2018)	9	Ni Ni Khin Zaw	Jubilee Tun	"Making Love Out of Nothing at All"	Eliminated
Episode 11 (Sunday, April 29, 2018)	10	Kyar Pauk	Yoe Yoe	"Sin Sar Par Oo"	Eliminated
Episode 11 (Sunday, April 29, 2018)	11	Kyar Pauk	Myet Myet Myo Htet	"I Want to Hold Your Hand"	Public's vote
Episode 11 (Sunday, April 29, 2018)	12	Kyar Pauk	Jawa Aung Moon	"A Mat Ta Ya Nya Nay"	KP's choice

=== Week 2: 2nd Live shows (May.6) ===
Date	Order	Coach	Artist	Song	Result
Episode 12 (Sunday, May 6, 2018)	1	Kyar Pauk	Susan Aye	"Psycho Killer"	Eliminated
Episode 12 (Sunday, May 6, 2018)	2	Kyar Pauk	Ye Naing Htoo	"Love Me Tender"	Public's vote
Episode 12 (Sunday, May 6, 2018)	3	Kyar Pauk	Hnin Eindray Shin	"Love Of My Life"	KP's choice
Episode 12 (Sunday, May 6, 2018)	4	Lynn Lynn	Nang Zar Chi Lynn	"Note Sett Htwat Khwar Chin"	Eliminated
Episode 12 (Sunday, May 6, 2018)	5	Lynn Lynn	Pyae Say Maung	"Zombie"	Lynn's choice
Episode 12 (Sunday, May 6, 2018)	6	Lynn Lynn	Ip Shen Paung	"Cherry Lann"	Public's choice
Episode 12 (Sunday, May 6, 2018)	7	Ni Ni Khin Zaw	Thet Noe Wai	"Min Lay Ko Chit Lo"	Eliminated
Episode 12 (Sunday, May 6, 2018)	8	Ni Ni Khin Zaw	Mark Jason	"Wai Da Nar"	Ni Ni's choice
Episode 12 (Sunday, May 6, 2018)	9	Ni Ni Khin Zaw	Wai Hnin Maung	"Let's Get Loud"	Public's vote
Episode 12 (Sunday, May 6, 2018)	10	Yan Yan Chan	Oishi	"Billionaire"	YC's choice
Episode 12 (Sunday, May 6, 2018)	11	Yan Yan Chan	Khaing Myae Thit Sar	"Ma Haung Tae Nay"	Public's vote
Episode 12 (Sunday, May 6, 2018)	12	Yan Yan Chan	Woofer	"Yay Tain Neet Chin"	Eliminated

=== Week 3: 3rd Live shows (May.13) ===
Date	Order	Coach	Artist	Song	Result
Episode 13 (Sunday, May 13, 2018)	1	Kyar Pauk	Myet Myet Myo Htet	"Symphony"	Eliminated
Episode 13 (Sunday, May 13, 2018)	2	Kyar Pauk	Jawa Aung Moon	"Maw Ha Sar Thu Myar"	Eliminated
Episode 13 (Sunday, May 13, 2018)	3	Kyar Pauk	Hnin Eindray Shin	"Nga Yae Rebecca"	KP's choice
Episode 13 (Sunday, May 13, 2018)	4	Kyar Pauk	Ye Naing Htoo	"Delilah"	Public's vote
Episode 13 (Sunday, May 13, 2018)	5	Yan Yan Chan	Sai N	"I Don't Want to Miss a Thing"	Eliminated
Episode 13 (Sunday, May 13, 2018)	6	Yan Yan Chan	Oishi	"Thinking Out Loud"	Eliminated
Episode 13 (Sunday, May 13, 2018)	7	Yan Yan Chan	Thaw Di	"A Maint"	YC's choice
Episode 13 (Sunday, May 13, 2018)	8	Yan Yan Chan	Khaing Myae Thit Sar	"Girl on Fire"	Public's vote

=== Week 4: 4th Live shows (May.20) ===
Date	Order	Coach	Artist	Song	Result
Episode 14 (Sunday, May 20, 2018)	1	Lynn Lynn	Ce Ce	"Hero"	Eliminated
Episode 14 (Sunday, May 20, 2018)	2	Lynn Lynn	Ngwe Soe	"A May Yote Yee"	Public's vote
Episode 14 (Sunday, May 20, 2018)	3	Lynn Lynn	Pyae Say Maung	"Way Pyi Baby"	Eliminated
Episode 14 (Sunday, May 20, 2018)	4	Lynn Lynn	Ip Shen Paung	"Sue Lay"	Lynn's choice
Episode 14 (Sunday, May 20, 2018)	5	Ni Ni Khin Zaw	Wai Hnin Maung	"Thu Ngal Chin A Twat"	Eliminated
Episode 14 (Sunday, May 20, 2018)	6	Ni Ni Khin Zaw	Mark Jason	"All Out of Love"	Public's vote
Episode 14 (Sunday, May 20, 2018)	7	Ni Ni Khin Zaw	Andrew	"Par Par Lay Par"	Eliminated
Episode 14 (Sunday, May 20, 2018)	8	Ni Ni Khin Zaw	Grace Monica	"Colors of the Wind"	Ni Ni's choice

=== Week 5: Live shows semi-finals (May.27) ===
Date	Order	Coach	Artist	Song	Coach points	Public points	Result
Episode 15 (Sunday, May 27, 2018)	1	Yan Yan Chan	Khaing Myae Thit Sar	"A Chit Mee"	N/A	N/A	Eliminated
Episode 15 (Sunday, May 27, 2018)	2	Yan Yan Chan	Thaw Di	"Yin Khone Bet Tho Tan Chin"	N/A	N/A	Advanced to Finals
Episode 15 (Sunday, May 27, 2018)	3	Lynn Lynn	Ip Shen Paung	"Pa Hta Ma Chay Lann"	N/A	N/A	Eliminated
Episode 15 (Sunday, May 27, 2018)	4	Lynn Lynn	Ngwe Soe	"Ta Nay Nay"	N/A	N/A	Advanced to Finals
Episode 15 (Sunday, May 27, 2018)	5	Ni Ni Khin Zaw	Mark Jason	"A Chit Sone"	N/A	N/A	Advanced to Finals
Episode 15 (Sunday, May 27, 2018)	6	Ni Ni Khin Zaw	Grace Monica	"Beautiful"	N/A	N/A	Eliminated
Episode 15 (Sunday, May 27, 2018)	7	Kyar Pauk	Ye Naing Htoo	"Chaw Yal"	N/A	N/A	Eliminated
Episode 15 (Sunday, May 27, 2018)	8	Kyar Pauk	Hnin Eindray Shin	"Ma Nae Maung"	N/A	N/A	Advanced to Finals

=== Week 6: Finale (June.3) ===
Date	Coach	Artist	Order	Solo song	Order	Coach tribute song	Result
Episode 16 (last episode) (Sunday, June 3, 2018)	Yan Yan Chan	Thaw Di	1	"A Maint"	5	"One Moment in Time"	Runner-up
Episode 16 (last episode) (Sunday, June 3, 2018)	Lynn Lynn	Ngwe Soe	2	"A Thae Kwae Ae Thal"	6	"Yarzawin Myar Yae Thato Thamee"	Winner
Episode 16 (last episode) (Sunday, June 3, 2018)	Kyar Pauk	Hnin Eindray Shin	3	"A Shone Htet Po Thaw"	7	"All About That Bass"	Runner-up
Episode 16 (last episode) (Sunday, June 3, 2018)	Ni Ni Khin Zaw	Mark Jason	4	"All of Me"	8	"Thabarwa Hnint Tway Sone Chin"	Runner-up
