= REDvolution Show =

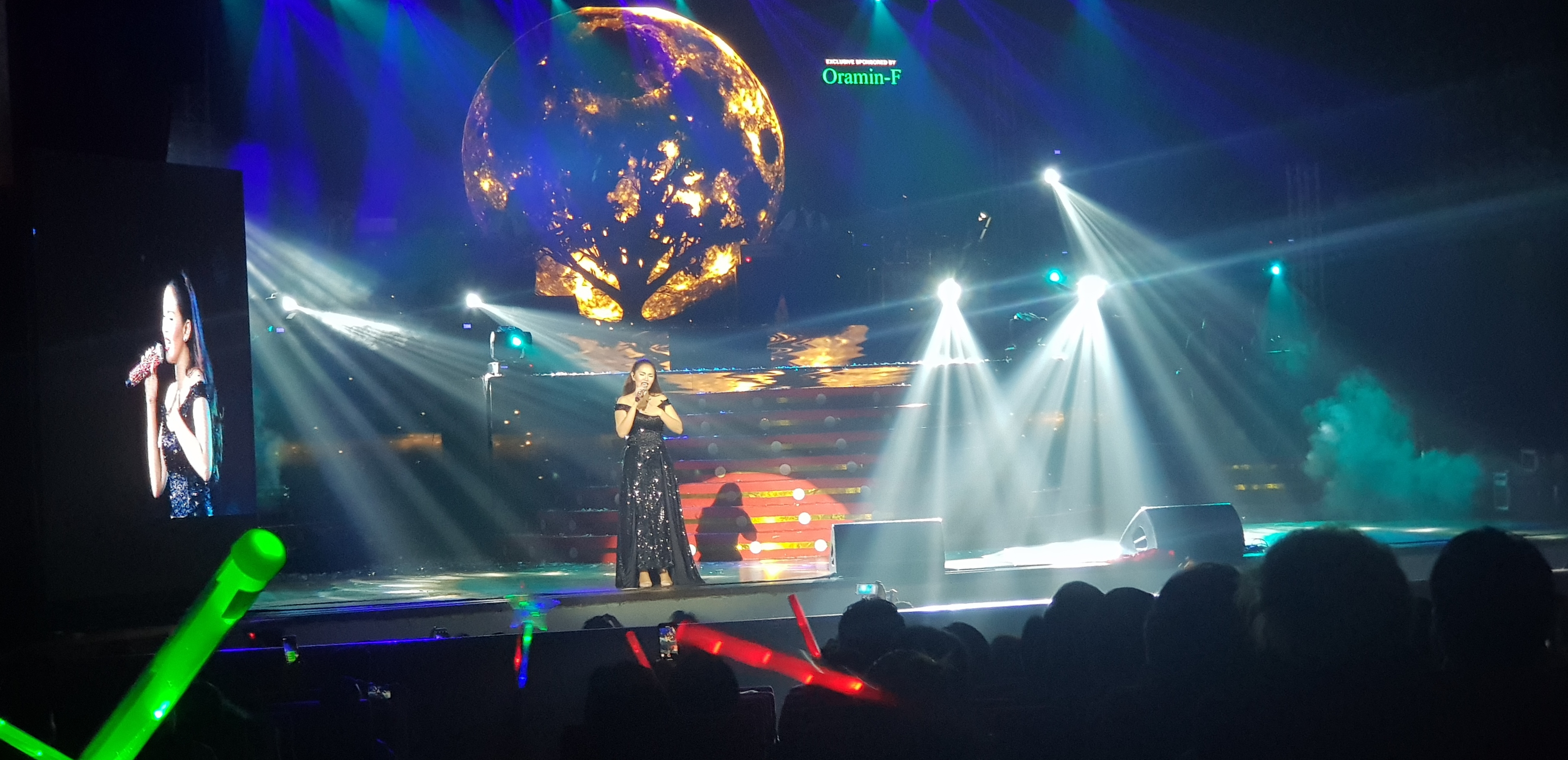
singer Ni Ni Khin Zaw

REDVolution Shows are the music stage shows performed by the Burmese pop singer Ni Ni Khin Zaw.

== REDVolution Show, 2017 ==
REDvolution Show
- Show Poster
- Date: 1 April 2017
- Time: MMT19:00 to 23:00
- Duration: 4 Hours
- Venue: People's Square and Park
- Location: Yangon
- Also known as: One Lady Show
- Type: Music Show
- Participants: Ni Ni Khin Zaw, Aung Htet, Nine One, Mi Sandi, Gita Gabyar Orchestra

The first REDvolution Show was held in People's Square and Park on 1 April 2017. This is the very first one lady show in her career life of 9 years. She presented with Gita Kabyar Orchestra, Oxygen Music Band and Secret Pieces (Dance Group). She also sang some duet songs with other famous singers.

=== Major Parts ===
There are three major parts in the show.

1. Opening
2. Band
3. Orchestra and Dance

=== Songs ===
- Opening Part
1. Super Red +Mario
2. Super Sunday
3. Thitsar Ma Pyat Kyay
4. A Way Yout Nay Par Thaw Lal
- Band Part
1. Nin Lo At Khal Yin
2. Ma Kwal Khin
3. Myaw Lint Sal
4. Su Taung Tway Pyae Chin Tal+Moe Tain Kabyar + A Yaung Ma Soe Nal(with Nine One)
- Orchestra Part
1. Mingalarbar (with Aung Htet)
2. InnLay Mar Ywar Tal Moe
3. Kyay Khyun (With Mi Sandi)
4. Yat (Stop)
5. A Shone Ma Pay Nal
6. Ma Lo Chinn Bu Sit
7. Myaw Lint Chat Ta Sone Ta Yar
- Dance
1. Lay Yin Pyan
2. Yat Sat Twar Thu
3. Youne Lite Tine Hmar
4. Yan Thu
5. Soe Yain Chit
6. Bad Boy
7. Gal Pal Gal Pal
- Close Song

Water Party Yay Party

== Retro REDVolution Show, 2018 ==
The second show for REDVolution show is "Retro REDVolution show" which was performed with retro theme. It was held in Yangon on 7 and 8 April 2018 for two days. This is her 2nd one lady show after REDvolution Show, presented in April 2017. This show was held finely for her 10th years Anniversary of her career life.

Retro REDVolution
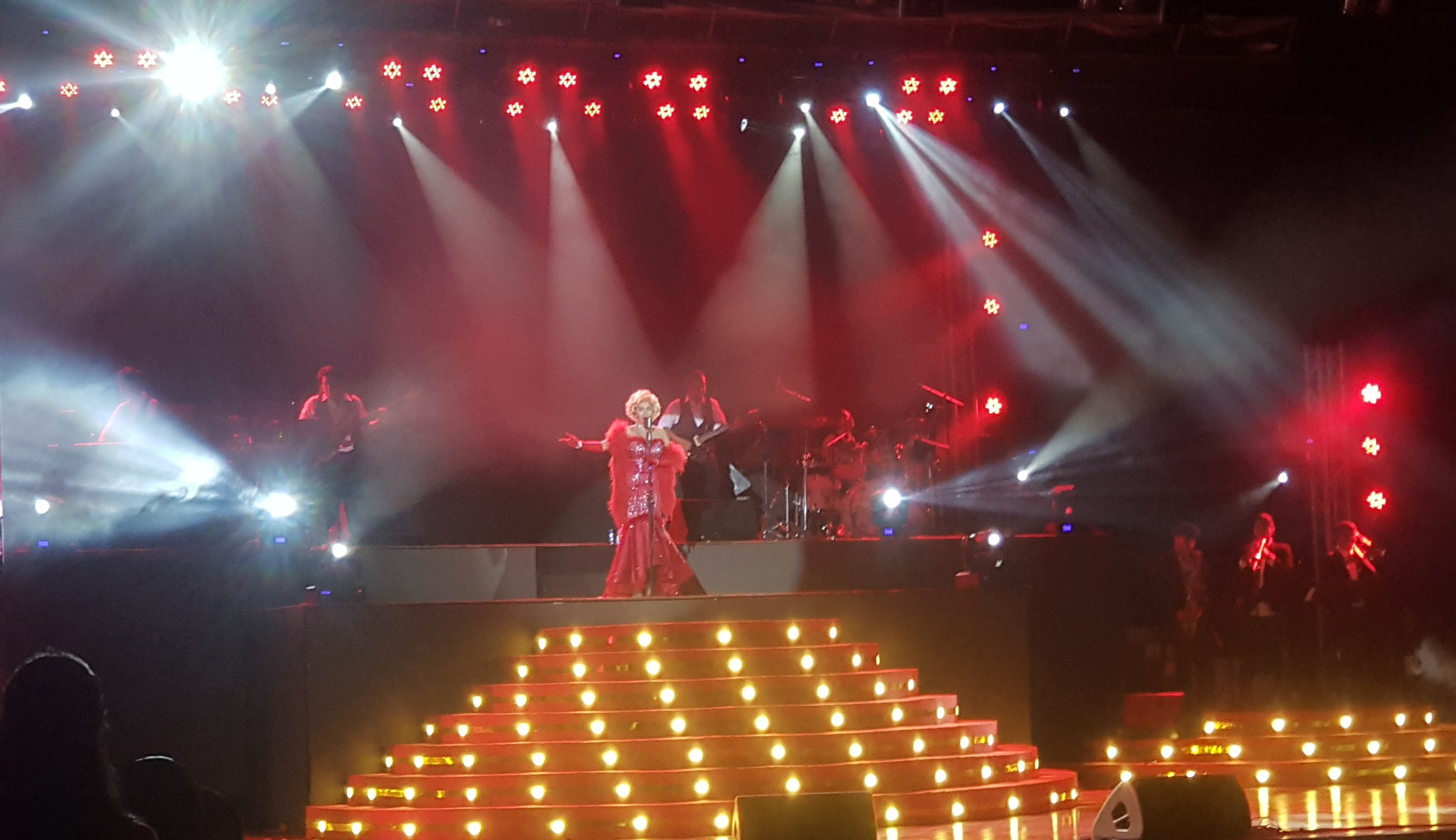
- Ni Ni Khin Zaw performing Opening song
- Date: 7 April 2018; 8 April 2018
- Time: MMT20:00 to 22:30
- Duration: 2:30 Hors
- Venue: National Theatre of Yangon
- Location: Yangon
- Also known as: One Lady Show
- Theme: Retro
- Organised by: Shwe Zin Management
- Filmed by: Midea 7
- Participants: Ni Ni Khin Zaw; Waila and G Fatt (with music video); Annie; Saw Sandi Naing; Oxygen Band*; Secret Pieces (Dance Group): Artists from Thailand

=== Parts ===
- Marilyn Monroe Style

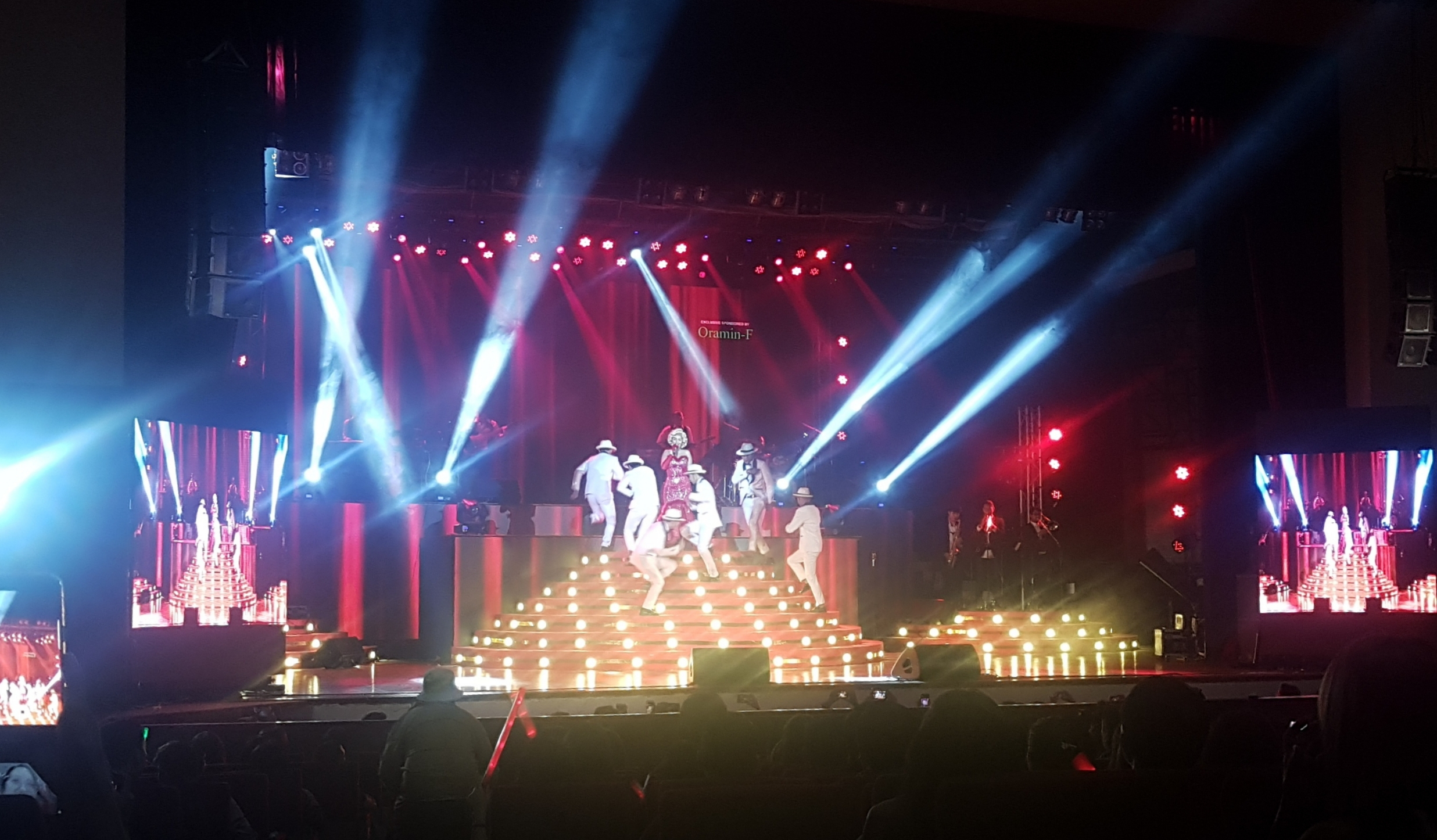

- Fresly Style

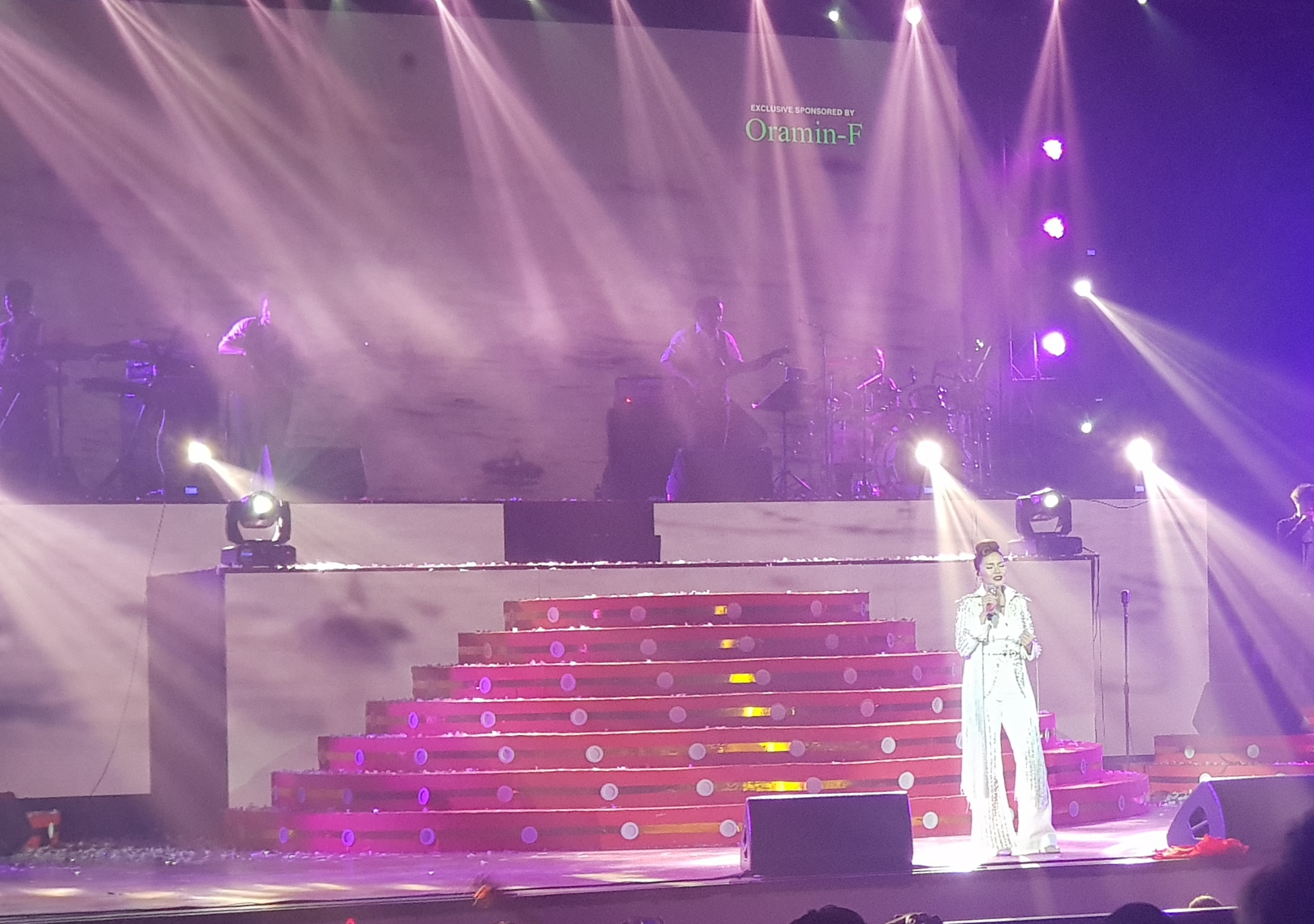

- Musical

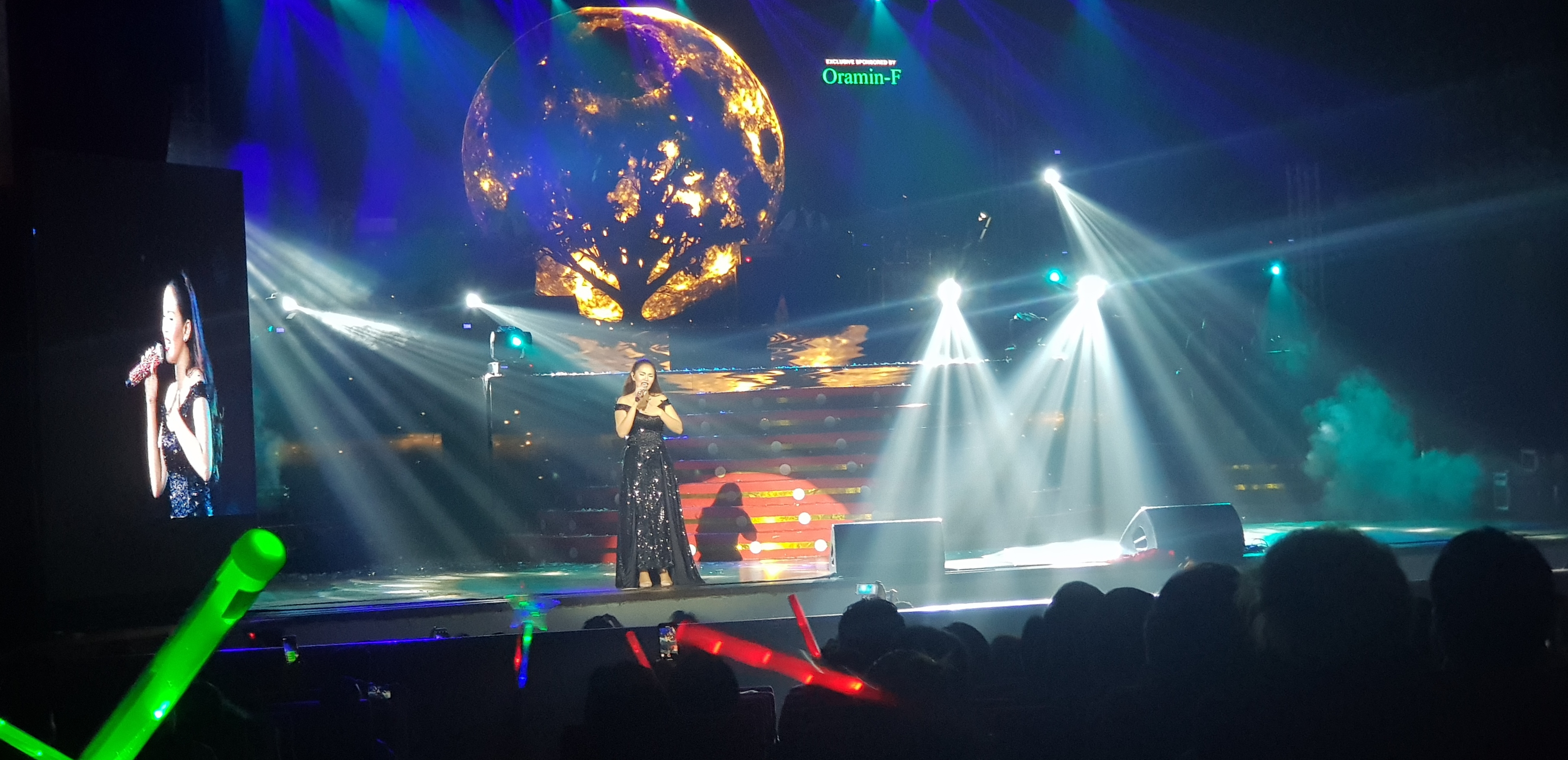

- India Dance

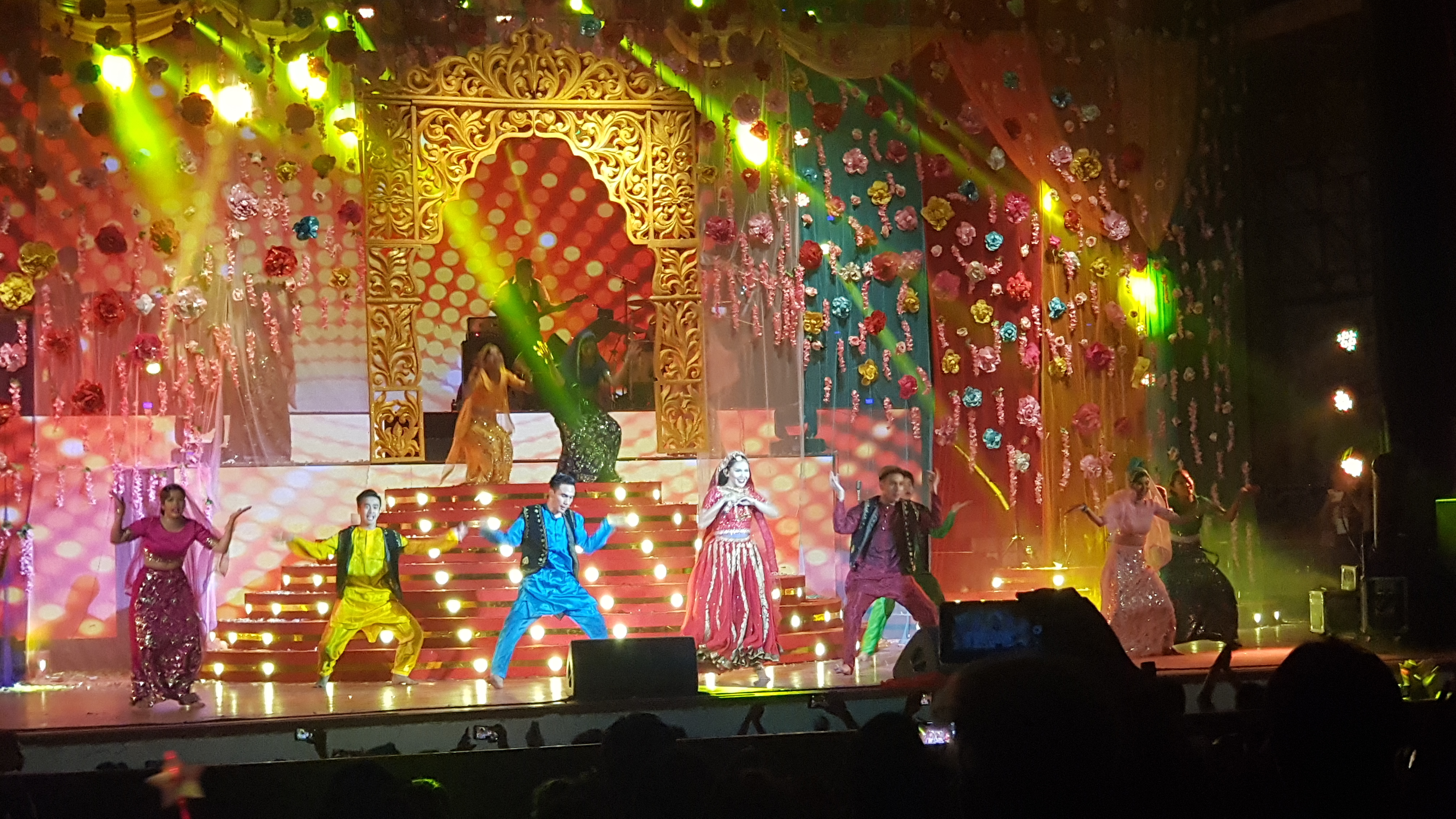

- Dance

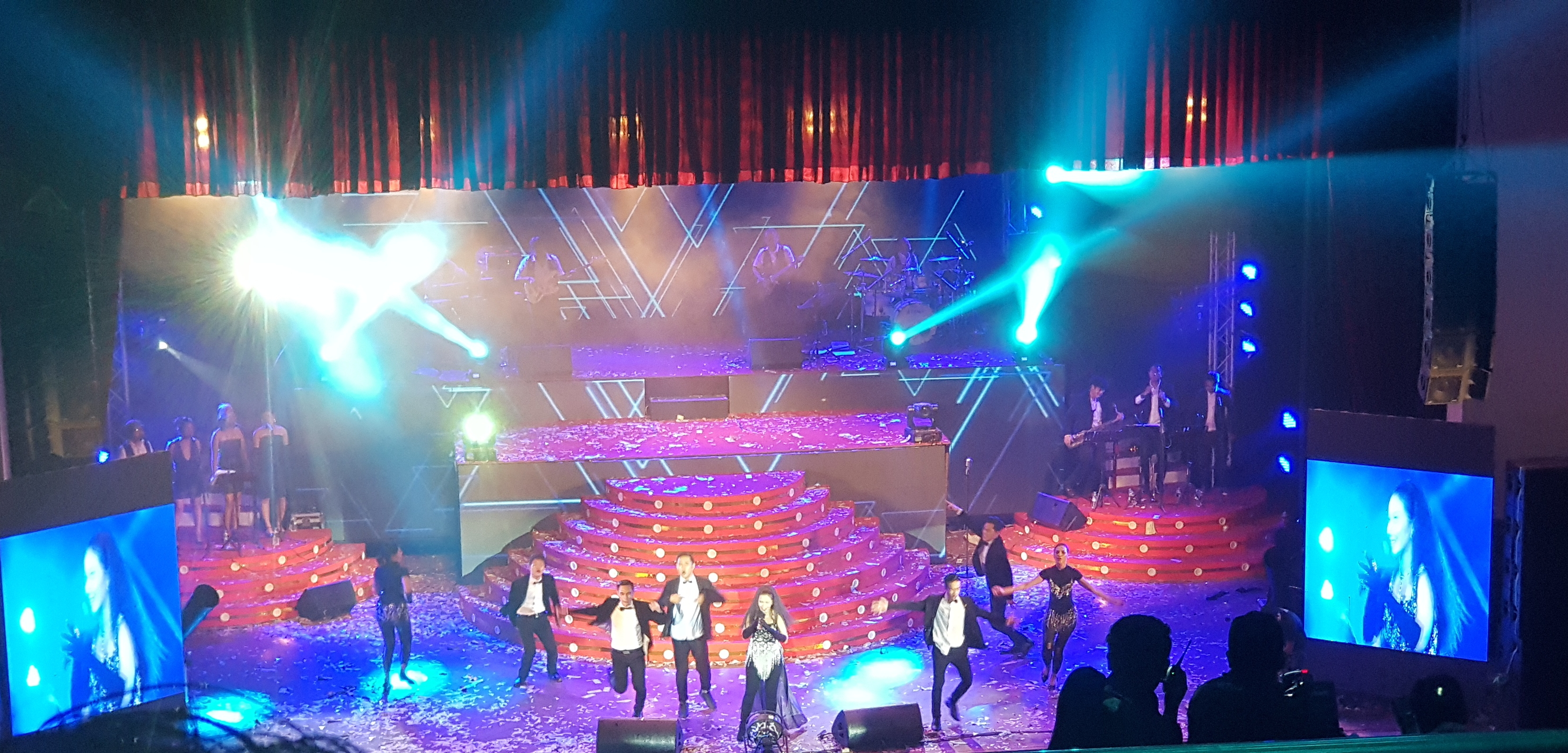

=== Songs ===
- Marilyn Monroe Style
- REDVolution Show Theme Song
- Good Kisser
- Lay Yin Pyan
- Melody World Songs(Ma Nyar Talt Buu+Ma Lwan Yal Thay Buu+Na Maw Na Mal+Hont Sat Htwat Kwar Chin+Yat)
- Stand by Me
- Fresly Style
- Super Red(Dance of Secret Pieces)
- Byin
- Soe Yain Chit
- A Yeit Ta Khu Paing Saing Chin
- Yat Sat Twar Thu
- Yat Sat Tal Moe
- Thitsar Ma Pyat Kyay
- A Yaung Ma Soe Nal
- Ah Lat Kar Pal
- Muu
- Musical
- Kayay Lan Diary
- Moe Sat Tin Lay
- Inlay Hmar Ywar Tal Moe
- India Dance
- Mario
- Nin A Na Na
- Dance
- Million Dollar Baby
- Yan Thu
- Bad Boy
- Water Party Yay Party
- U

== Party REDVolution Show, 2019 ==
The third show for REDVolution show is "Party REDVolution show" which was performed on 2 November 2019 in Mandalay.

Party REDVolution
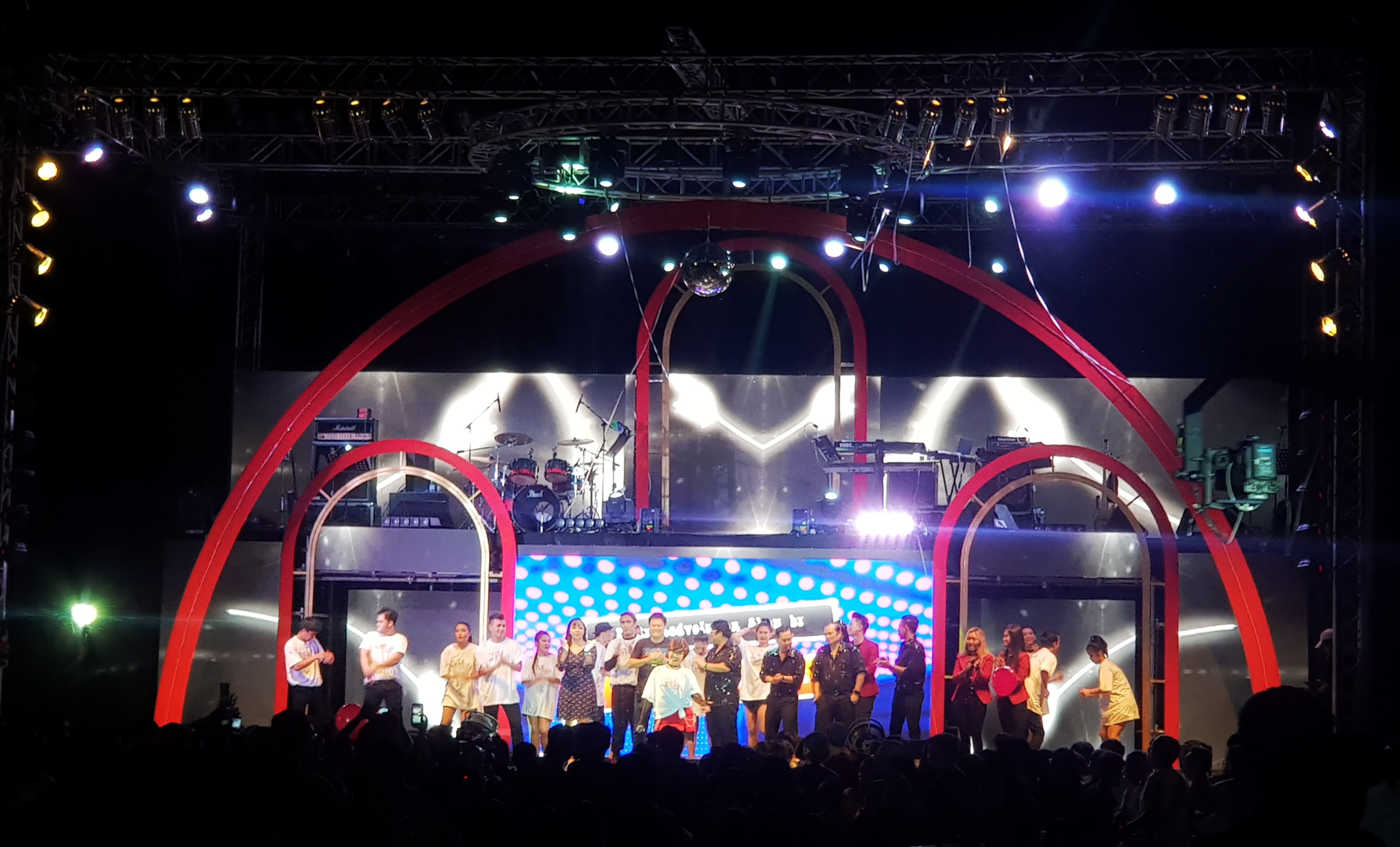
- Ni Ni Khin Zaw and the team
- Date: 2 November 2019
- Time: 8:00 to 10:30 PM
- Duration: 2:30
- Venue: Mingalar Mandalay
- Location: Mandalay
- Also known as: One Lady Show
- Theme: Party
- Participants: Ni Ni Khin Zaw; Annie; Saw Sandi Naing; Oxygen Band; Secret Pieces

- Party

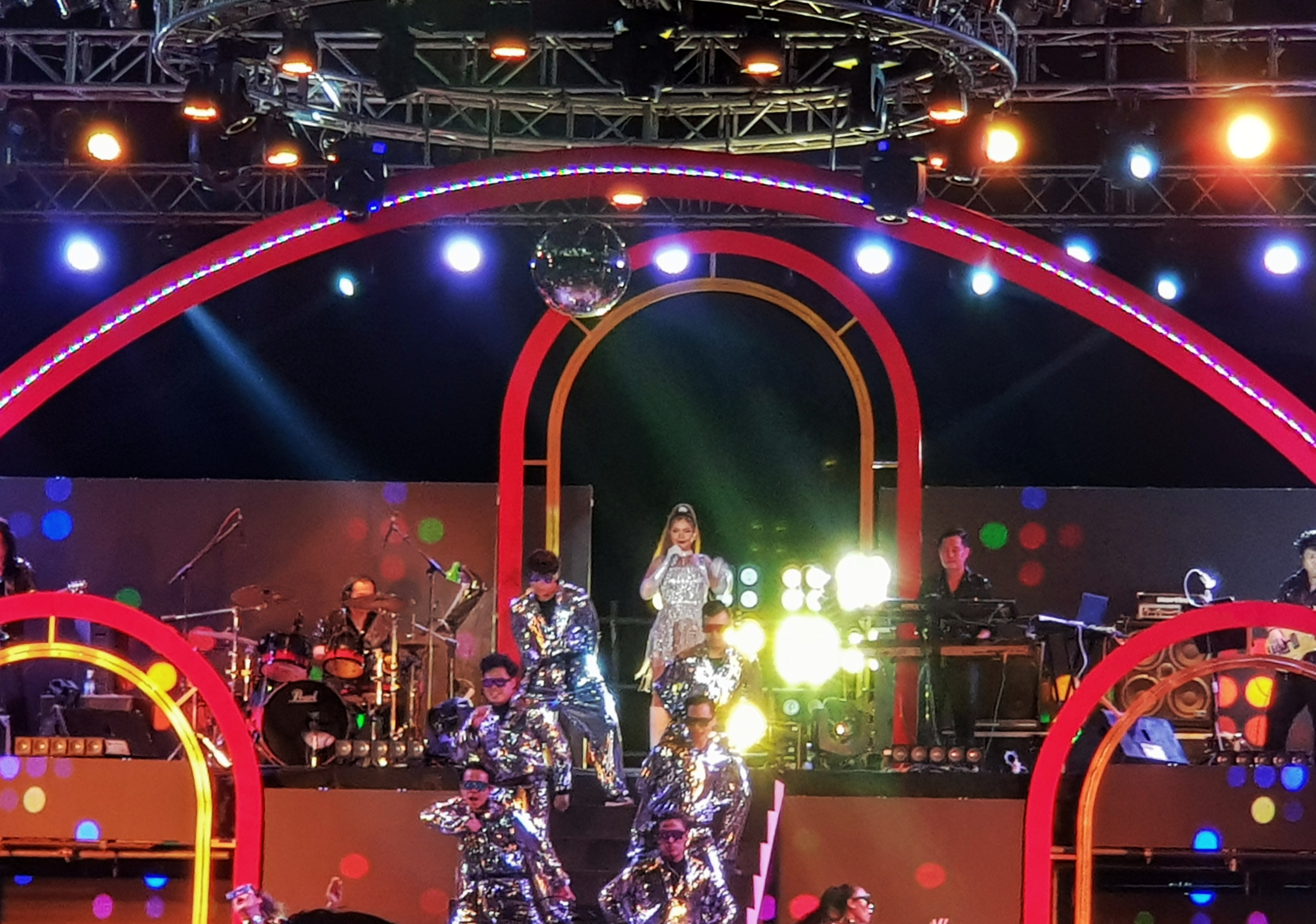

- LATINO

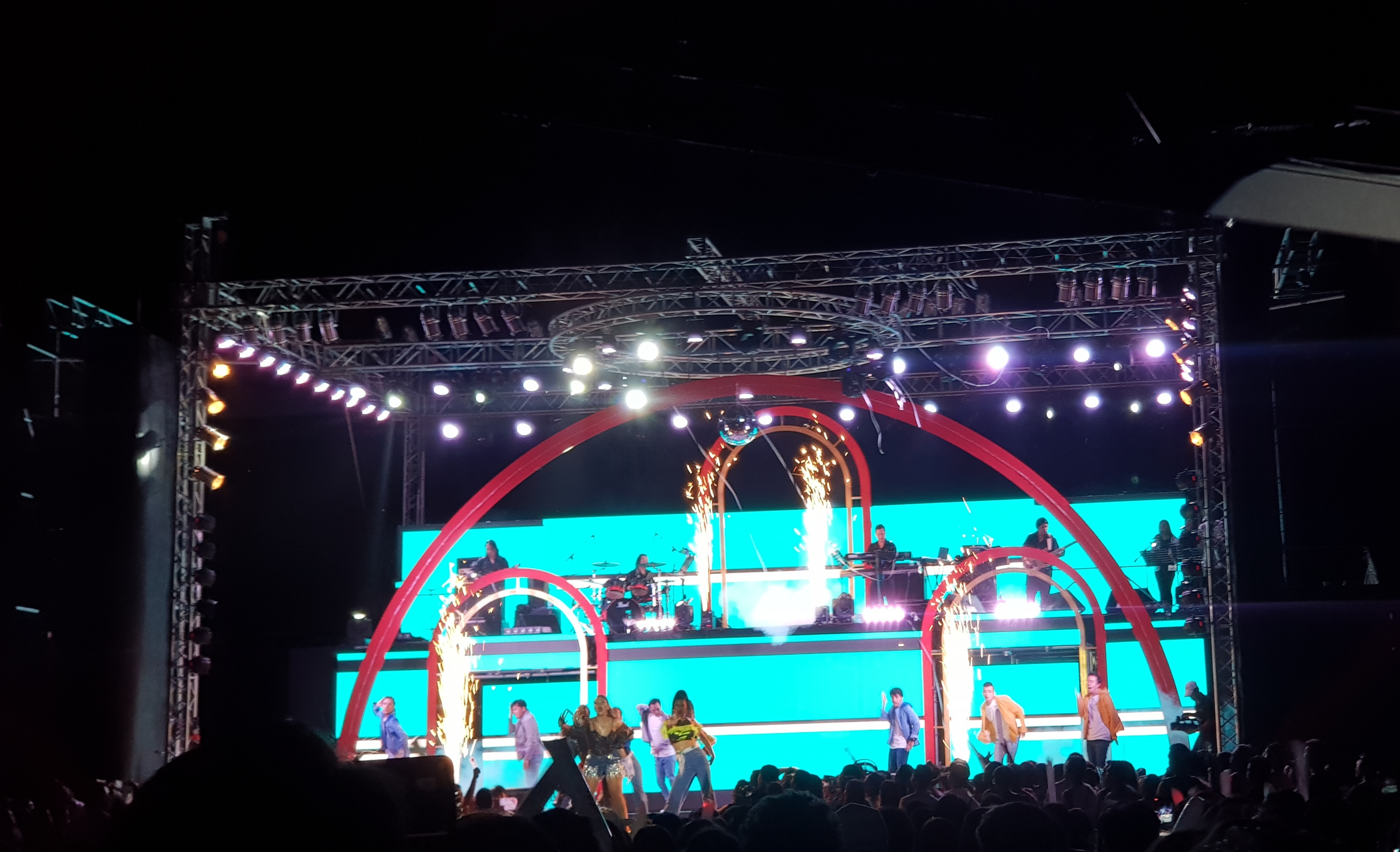

- Hit Songs

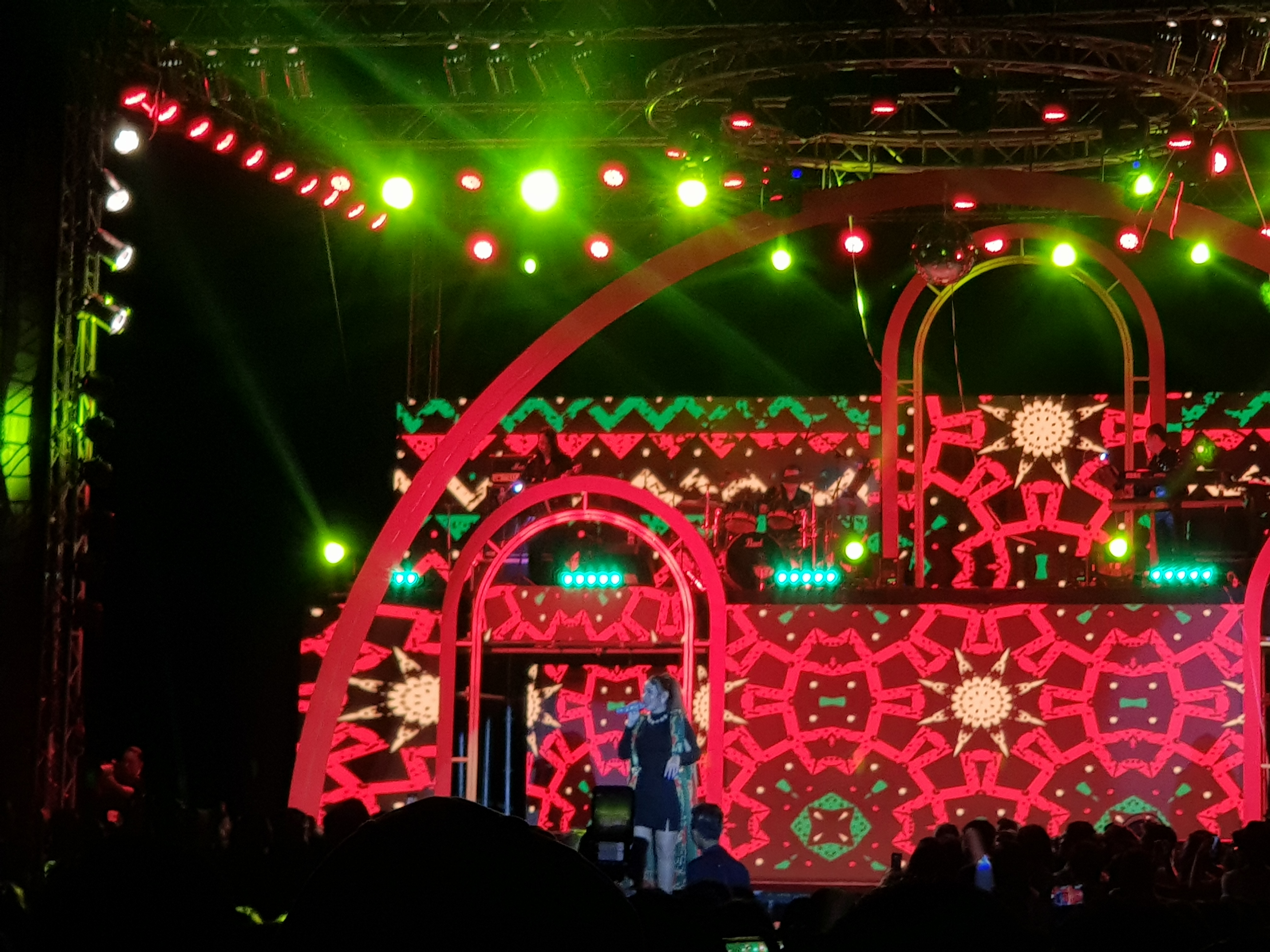

- Disco

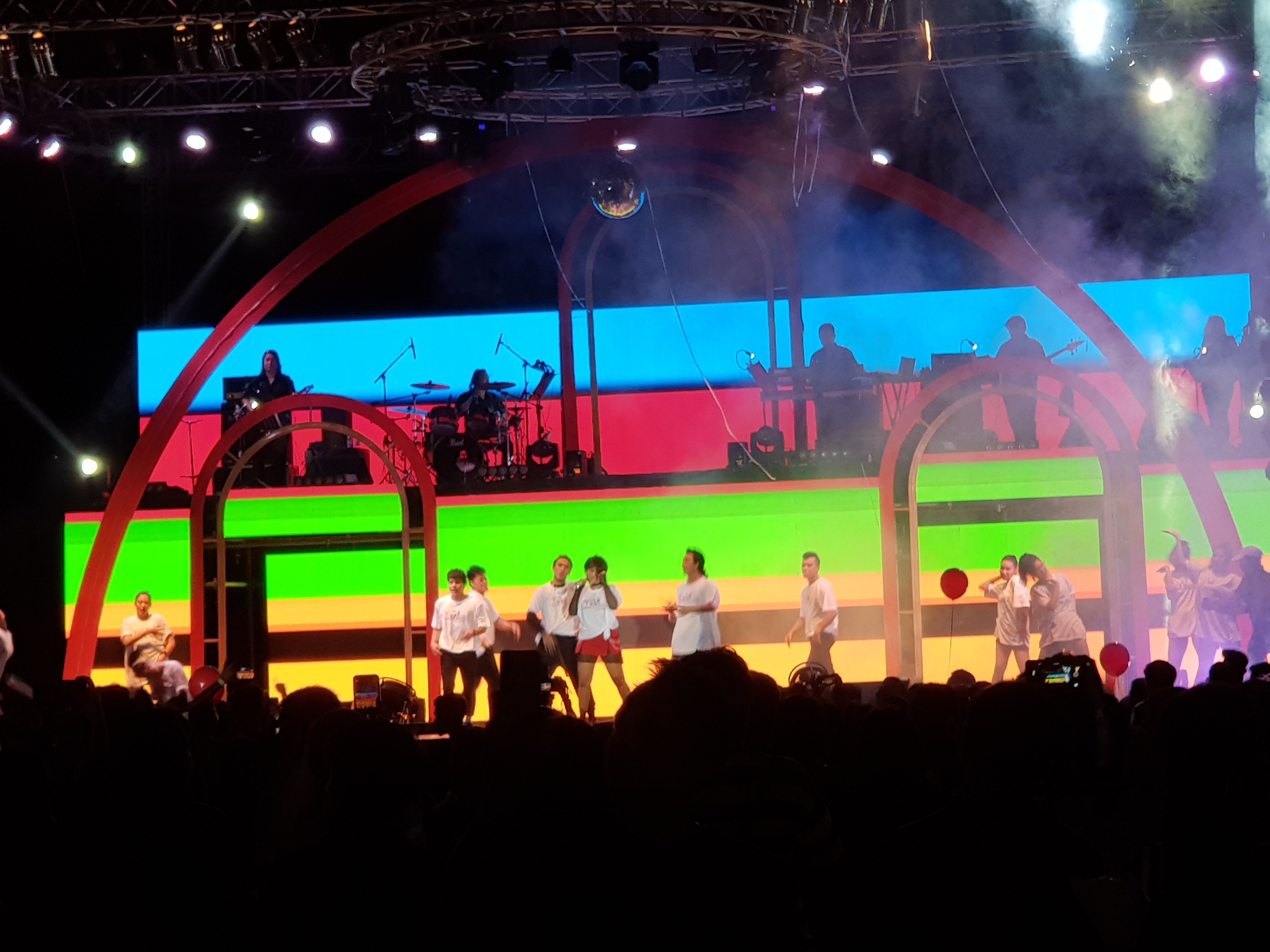

=== Songs ===
==== Party ====
1. REDVolution Theme Song + Party Khin Zaw
2. Mario
3. Lay Yin Pyan
4. L.O.V.E
5. Htine Hta
6. Super Red

==== Latino ====
1. Bon Pa Pa
2. Nay Win Chain
3. U
4. Yan Thu
5. Chit Chin Tat Chin
6. Bad Boy

==== Hit Songs ====
1. Byim
2. A Sin Pyay Par Tal
3. Myaw Lint Sal
4. A Lat Kar Pal
5. A Yaung Ma Soe Nal
6. Soe Yain Chit
7. Ma Kwal Khin
8. Thitsar Ma Pyat Kyay
9. Chit Hlyat Lan Kwal
10. A Chit Ya Sone Thu Sain

==== Disco ====
1. Bloody Red
2. Million Dollar Baby
3. Nint Nar Nar
4. Summer
5. Stand by me
6. Gal Pal Gal Pal
