= Yuzana =

Burmese pop singer

Yuzana ယုဇန
- Born: Yuzana Myint Ngwe
- Origin: Myanmar
- Genres: Burmese pop
- Occupation: Singer
- Instrument: voice

Yuzana (Burmese: ယုဇန, pronounced [jṵzəna̰]; born Yuzana Myint Ngwe) is a Burmese pop singer.

== Career ==
Yuzana began her music career as a member of the band 102.7 FM

In 2020, she appeared as a surprise guest performer during the blind auditions of The Voice Myanmar Season 3, where her performance of the song "Pa Di Pa Kha" garnered over 13 million views on YouTube.

== Personal life ==
Yuzana was born into a musical family, her parents are songwriter Myint Ngwe (Hinthada) and singer Tin Tin Aye. Her brother, Phyo Gyi, is also a vocalist. In February 2008, she married Thein Htaik Aung, an Australian national.

== Discography ==
=== Studio Albums ===
- A Chit Sue (အချစ်ဆူး) (2006)

=== Singles ===
- "Nhote Sat Lan Khwel" (featuring Aung Kaung Htet) (နှုတ်ဆက်လမ်းခွဲ) (2019)
- "A Sate Thint Sue" (အဆိပ်သင့်ဆူး) (2020)
- "Mhyaw Lint Chin Yaung Ni" (မျှော်လင့်ခြင်းရောင်နီ) (2024)
