= R Zar Ni =

Burmese singer (born 1978)

R Zar Ni R ဇာနည်
- Born: Zar Ni Myo Nyunt; 6 February 1978 (age 48); Yangon, Myanmar
- Genres: Pop, Rock, Pop rock,
- Occupation: singer
- Instrument: guitar
- Years active: 2000 – present

Zarni Myo Nyunt, ဇာနည်မျိုးညွန့်, [zà nì mjó ɲʊ̰ɰ̃] (born on 6 February 1978), better known as R Zarni (Burmese: R ဇာနည်, pronounced [ʔà zànì] is a Burmese singer. He is best known for Burmese language covers of Western and Asian (Cantopop, Mandopop K-pop) pop songs. He won the Yangon City FM Awards for "Most Popular Male Recording Artist Award" from 2004 to 2010.

== Early life ==
R Zar Ni was born Zarni Myo Nyunt, to Myo Lwin and Kaythwe Nyunt in Yangon. He has a younger brother, Thiha Myo Nyunt, who is an aspiring singer with the stage name of M Thiha. Zarni grew up in Yangon's Tamwe Township.

== Career ==
After failing the university matriculation exam, he first tried to become a sailor. By accident, he was discovered and become a singer. He began his music career by winning local singing competitions, which led him to pursue music full-time. Early on, he gained popularity covering Western rock bands like Bon Jovi and Guns N' Roses, introducing these sounds to a then-isolated Myanmar.

R Zarni achieved widespread fame around 2011, culminating in a sold-out one-man show at Thuwunna Stadium in Yangon. He became a symbol of rock in Myanmar, recognized for his consistently strong vocals and polished live performances. His diverse catalog, particularly his romantic love songs, has maintained his appeal across generations.

In 2018, he had contracted to become a judge in the second season of The Voice Myanmar. He served as a judge in season 2 and season 3.

== Political activities ==
Following the 2021 Myanmar coup d'état, R Zar Ni was active in the anti-coup movement both in person at rallies and through social media. He joined the "We Want Justice" three-finger salute movement. The movement was launched on social media, and many celebrities have joined the movement. On 2 April 2021, warrants for his arrest were issued under section 505 (a) of the Myanmar Penal Code by the State Administration Council for speaking out against the military coup. Along with several other celebrities, he was charged with calling for participation in the Civil Disobedience Movement (CDM) and damaging the state's ability to govern, supporting the Committee Representing Pyidaungsu Hluttaw, and generally inciting the people to disturb the peace and stability of the nation.

== Discography ==
R Zar Ni has released four solo albums. Most of his recordings were released as part of collaborative albums with various artists. Throughout his career, he has sing more than 60 albums.

=== Solo albums ===
- Nga-Go Chit-Te-Thu (2001)
- Si Ta-Hpet-Cha (2004)
- A-hseit Tet Einmet (2010)
- Eaint-mat Yin Saunt (2016)

== Accolades ==
| Award | Year | Recipient(s) and nominee(s) | Category | Result | Ref. |
|---|---|---|---|---|---|
| City FM awards | 2004 | R Zarni | Most Popular Male Vocalist of the Year | Won | |
| City FM awards | 2005 | R Zarni | Most Popular Male Vocalist of the Year | Won | |
| City FM awards | 2005 | R Zarni | Best Selling Stereo Music Album Male Vocalist of the Year | Won | |
| City FM awards | 2006 | R Zarni | Most Popular Male Vocalist of the Year | Won | |
| City FM awards | 2007 | R Zarni | Most Popular Male Vocalist of the Year | Won | |
| City FM awards | 2008 | R Zarni | Most Popular Male Vocalist of the Year | Won | |
| City FM awards | 2009 | R Zarni | Most Popular Male Vocalist of the Year | Won | |
| City FM awards | 2010 | R Zarni | Most Popular Male Vocalist of the Year | Won | |
| City FM awards | 2011 | R Zarni | Best Selling Stereo Music Album Male Vocalist of the Year | Won | |
| Shwe FM awards | 2011 | R Zarni | Most Requested Single of the year(Male) | Won | |
