= Aung Htet =

Burmese singer and musician

Aung Htet အောင်ထက်
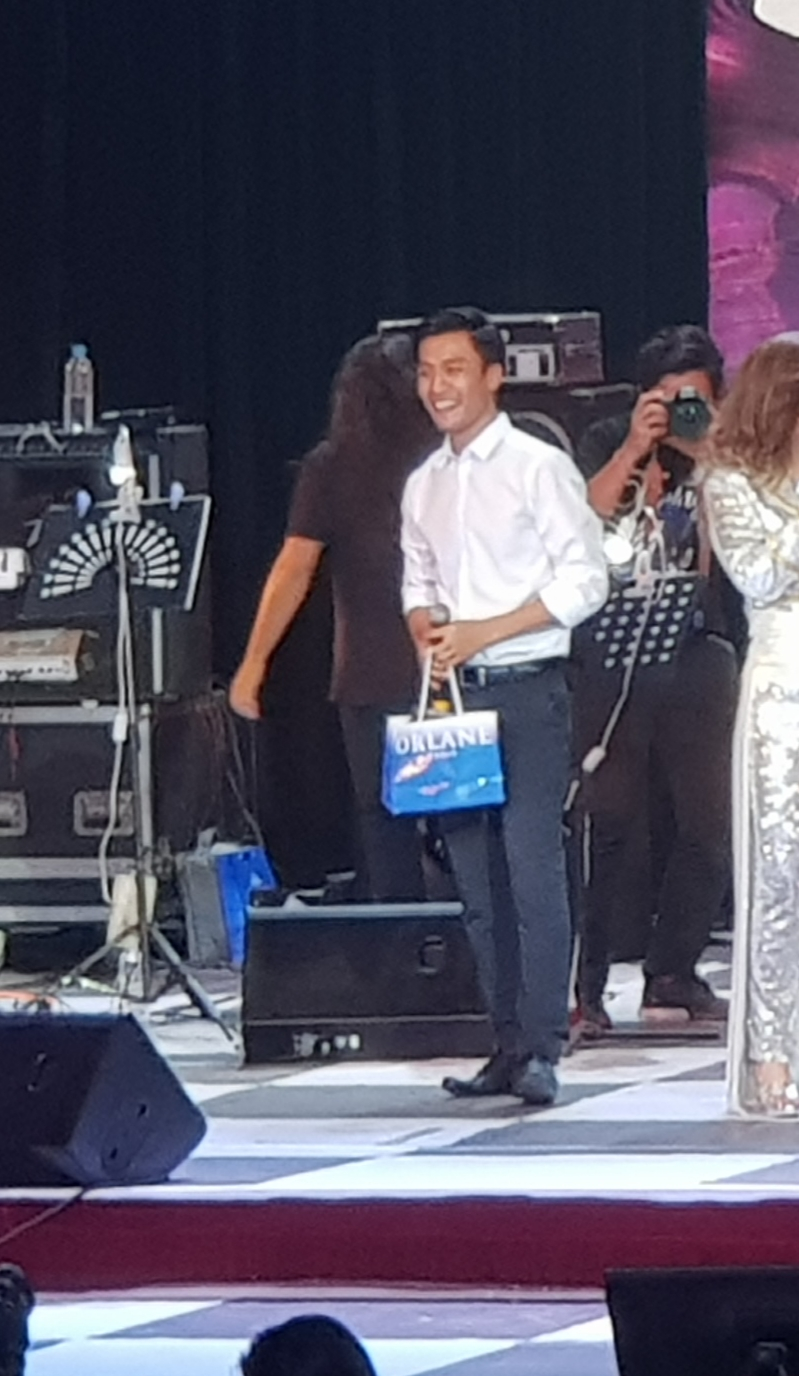

Background information
- Born: Thet Zin Htay; 17 August 1990 (age 35); Demoso, Myanmar
- Occupation: Musician
- Instruments: Piano, Guitar

Aung Htet (Burmese: အောင်ထက်, born Thet Zin Htay on 17 August 1990) is a Burmese singer and musician. In addition to singing, he plays the guitar and piano. He gained popularity while competing on the first season of Eain Mat Sone Yar (အိပ်မက်ဆုံရာ), a singing competition broadcast on Channel 7. During the competition, he was well received by audiences for innovative compositions of well-known Burmese songs. Aung Htet released his first album, Hey, Friend (ဟေ့...မိတ်ဆွေ) on 27 March 2016.

Born in a village located Demoso, Kayah State, Burma (now Myanmar), Aung Htet was raised in Magwe Region. He attended local monastic schools before moving to Yangon to complete his secondary education.

== Discography ==
- Hey, Helpmate (ဟေ့...မိတ်ဆွေ) (2016)
- Nhit (နှစ်) (2017)
- Flower Opened by Tear (မျက်ရည်နှင့် ပွင့်သောပန်း) (2016)

== Political activities ==
Following the 2021 Myanmar coup d'état, he participated in the anti-coup movement both in person at rallies and through social media. Denouncing the military coup, he took part in protests, starting in February. He joined the "We Want Justice" three-finger salute movement. The movement was launched on social media, and many celebrities have joined the movement.

On 12 April 2021, warrants for him arrest were issued under Section 505 (a) of the penal code by the State Administration Council for speaking out against the military coup. Along with several other celebrities, he was charged with calling for participation in the Civil Disobedience Movement (CDM) and damaging the state's ability to govern, with supporting the Committee Representing Pyidaungsu Hluttaw, and with generally inciting the people to disturb the peace and stability of the nation.
