= Ni Ni Khin Zaw =

Burmese pop singer (born 1991)

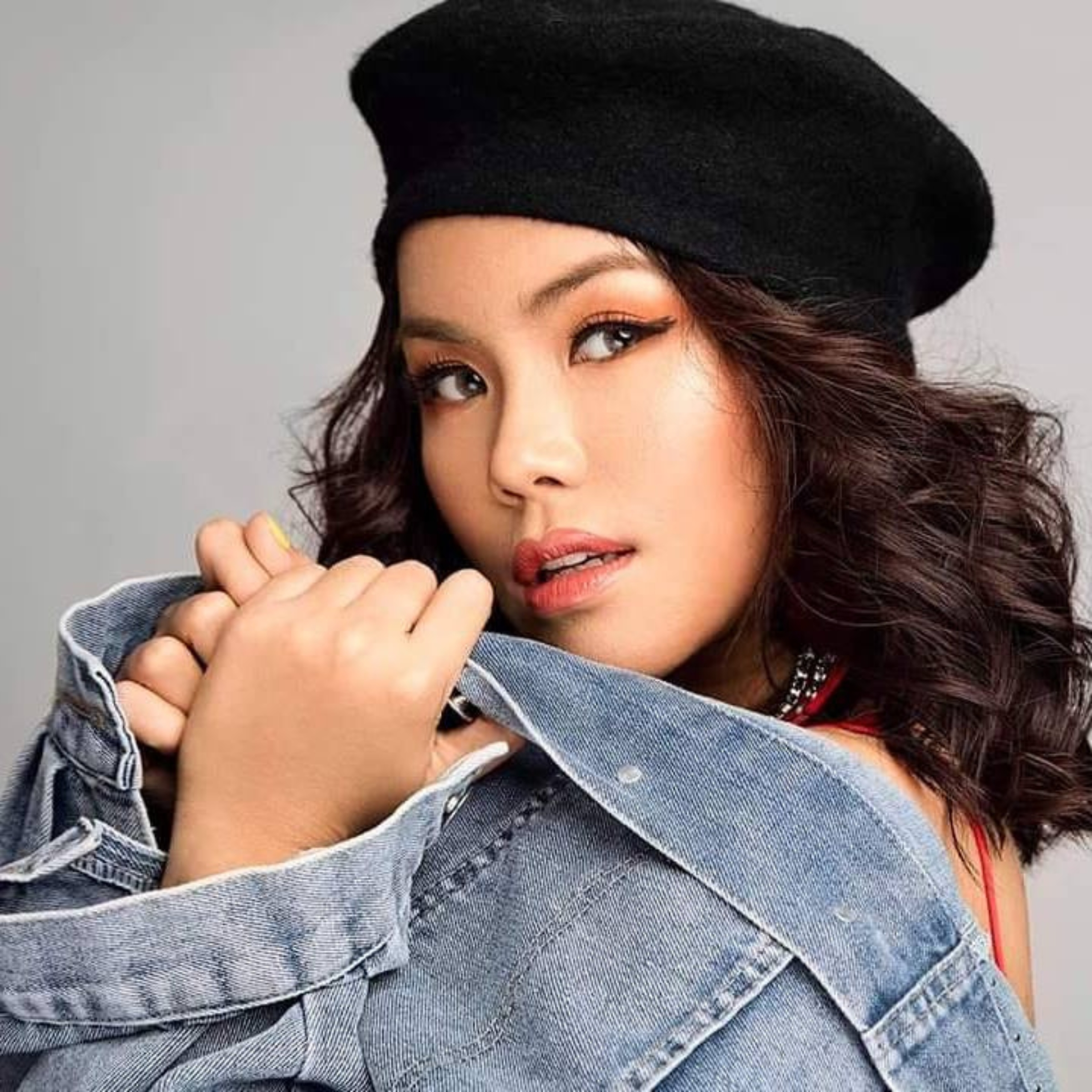
Ni Ni Khin Zaw Ni Ni Khin Zaw နီနီခင်ဇော်
- Born: Ni Ni Khin Zaw; 31 August 1991 (age 34); Yekyi, Myanmar
- Genres: Pop; R&B
- Occupations: Singer; Songwriter
- Instrument: Vocals
- Years active: 2008–present
- Website: Official website

Ni Ni Khin Zaw (Burmese: နီနီခင်ဇော်; born 31 August 1991) is a Burmese pop singer. She is the 2008 winner at The Best of Melody World, a televised singing competition. She performed in the opening and closing ceremonies of the 2013 Southeast Asian Games in Naypyidaw.

== Early life and education ==
She was born on 31 August 1991 in Yekyi, Myanmar. She attended and graduated from the University of Medicine 2, Yangon.

== Career ==
Ni Ni Khin Zaw participated and won the 2008 season of Melody World, a televised singing competition. She did not immediately join the music industry. Between 2008 and 2012, she pursued higher education, graduating with a medical degree from the University of Medicine 2, Yangon.

The leaking of The Best of Melody World 2008 album propelled her to stardom. She recorded three solo songs and one collaboration song in that album, including "Enemy" ("ရန်သူ"), "Although We're Far Away" ("အဝေးရောက်နေပါသော်လည်း"), and "Stop" ("ရပ်").

Throughout her career, she has collaborated with well-known Burmese artists. She collaborated with rapper Nine One in her single "Don't Colour" ("အရောင်မဆိုးနဲ့"), which garnered 20 million streams and 15 million in sales. In 2012, she also featured in Bobby Soxer's album Rocket (ဒုံးပျံ), namely a track called "Believe It" ("ယုံကြည်လိုက်"). Other well-known songs include "Cloud Poem" ("မိုးတိမ်ကဗျာ") with Yatha, a rapper; "Best Friends Forever" ("ထာဝရသူငယ်ချင်း") with Hlwan Paing; "Birthday Presents" ("မွေးနေ့လက်ဆောင်များ"), and "A Love That will Never Change" ("မပြောင်းလဲနိုင်တဲ့အချစ်").

In 2015, she released her iconic album Red. Upon the album's release, news emerged of her marriage to an older businessman and allegations that she had intentionally concealed her personal life to further her career. Ni Ni Khin Zaw held her first concert, the REDvolution Show, on 1 April 2017. Successive REDvolution shows have been held in April 2018 and November 2019 in Singapore.

Since 2018, Ni Ni Khin Zaw has served as a coach on three seasons of The Voice Myanmar.

== Honours and awards ==
- 2008 Winner at The Best of Melody World
- 2013 Most Popular Song (Shwe FM) for "Hope For Something" ("မျှော်လင့်ချက်တစ်စုံတစ်ရာ")
- 2013 Most Requested Song from Facebook (Shwe FM) for "Be Faithful" ("သစ္စာမပျက်ကြေး")
- 2014 Best Pop Song in Myanmar Music Awards (MMA) for "Hope for Something" ("မျှော်လင့်ချက်တစ်စုံတစ်ရာ")
- 2014 Best Song of Monsoon (Myanmar Music Awards, MMA) for "Hope for Something" ("မျှော်လင့်ချက်တစ်စုံတစ်ရာ")
- 2014 Best Pop Song of Monsoon - Artists' Choice (MMA, 2014) for "Hope for Something" ("မျှော်လင့်ချက်တစ်စုံတစ်ရာ")
- 2014 The Best Renew Song – Artists' Choice (MMA) for "Rain in Inlay Lake" ("အင်းလေးမှာရွာတဲ့မိုး")
- 2014 The Best Pop Singer (MMA)
- 2014 Most Popular Female Vocalist (City FM Award)
- 2015 Most Popular Female Vocalist (City FM)
- 2015 Best-Selling Studio Music Album Female Vocalist (City FM)
- 2016 Most Popular Female Vocalist (City FM)
- 2016 Most Popular Female Vocalist (City FM)
- 2017 1st Runner Up at ASEAN Song Contest

Major M Music Awards 2018

| Year | Recipient | Award | Result |
|---|---|---|---|
| 2018 | U | Best Pop Album | Nominated |
| 2018 | U | Album Of The Year | Nominated |
| 2018 | Kha Yay Lann Diary | Best Pop Song | Nominated |
| 2018 | Ni Ni Khin Zaw | Artist Of The Year | Nominated |
| 2018 | Retro Redvolution | Best Live Show | Won |
| 2018 | Best Live Performance | Mario (Retro Redvolution) | Won |
| 2018 | Stand By Me | Fav Song | Won |

- 2019 Top Artist Award at Major M Music Awards
- Top Artist Award by JOOX Music Platform
- Best in Music at Myanmar's Pride Awards (MPA)
- 2020 Most Popular Female Artist (City FM)

== Discography ==
=== Albums ===
- Mario (မာရီယို) (2013)
- Red (အနီရောင်) (2015)
- U (ယူ) (2017)
- Party Khin Zaw (ပါတီခင်ဇော်) (2019)

=== Mini albums ===
- Summer (2019)

== Personal life ==
Ni Ni Khin Zaw married Myo Myint Thein, a merchant vessel chief engineer and widower, on 10 June 2010. The couple divorced in 2013.

In February 2023, she softly revealed her engagement to her longtime boyfriend Sai Ye Min Thu, marking a tender new chapter in her life. In 2024, she married Sai Ye Min Thu, beginning their journey together as husband and wife.
