= Kyar Pauk =

Burmese singer and songwriter

Kyar Pauk ကျားပေါက်
- Born: Han Htue Lwin Taungoo, Myanmar
- Genre: Punk
- Occupations: Singer-songwriter, Singer, Composer, Guitarist, Producer
- Instruments: Guitar, Vocals, Handpan, Drums
- Years active: 2000–present
- Member of: Big Bag

Kyar Pauk (Burmese: ကျားပေါက်), born Han Htue Lwin (ဟန်ထူးလွင်), is a Burmese singer-songwriter and also known as a multi instrumentalist and music producer. He is best known for his punk music and founding the famous punk rock band Big Bag. He is the son of Ringo, who is a famous singer.

== Biography ==
Kyar Pauk was born in Taungoo, Myanmar. He founded punk rock band Big Bag in the summer of 2001. He is lead guitarist, lead vocalist & primary songwriter of Big Bag. Big Bang members include Ye Zaw Myo, Mung Boih and Phyo Min Naing.

Kyar Pauk was married to Su Le Win Zone Zone on October 29, 2006. They have two daughters, Emerald Htue Lwin and Khinmadi Htue Lwin. They divorced in 2019.

On 9 March 2018, his first solo exhibition had held named Outelligence at Yangon.

== Political activities ==
Following the 2021 Myanmar coup d'état, Kyar Pauk was active in the anti-coup movement through social media. On 3 April 2021, warrants for his arrest were issued under section 505 (a) of the penal code by the State Administration Council for speaking out against the military coup. Along with several other celebrities, he was charged with calling for participation in the Civil Disobedience Movement (CDM) and damaging the state's ability to govern, with supporting the Committee Representing Pyidaungsu Hluttaw, and with generally inciting the people to disturb the peace and stability of the nation.

== Albums with Big Bag ==
- Punk for all (2001)
- Famous
- Villain (2005)
- Bedtime music (2007)
- The Big Show In The Bag
- AD 3000 (2008)
- Telepunk (2009)
- The Sun Factory
- One Eleven (2011)
- We are Big Bag (2014 August)
- IDGAF (2015 Sep 30)
- Anger Management (2017)
- A Road to Starry Night (Unplugged) [Live] (2019)
- B-side Album(2026)

== Achievements ==
- Most Requested Song – Kyon Yin Pyaw Pay Par [City FM] 2010
- Freshest Song of the Year – Thee Khan [Myanmar Music Award] 2014
- People’s Choice [Myanmar Music Award] 2014
- Best Selling Album Villain [2007]
- Best Selling Album IDGAF [2015]

== Solo albums ==
- Cinematicüs (2020 October 23)
- Public Enemy (2023)
- Live Session in Paris (2025)

== Published books ==
- Knott Funni
- The Strange Old Man
- Kyaung Sar (2019)
- Giants On My Shoulders (2023)
- The Odyssey (2024)
