= Yan Yan Chan =

Yan Yan Chan ရန်ရန်ချမ်း
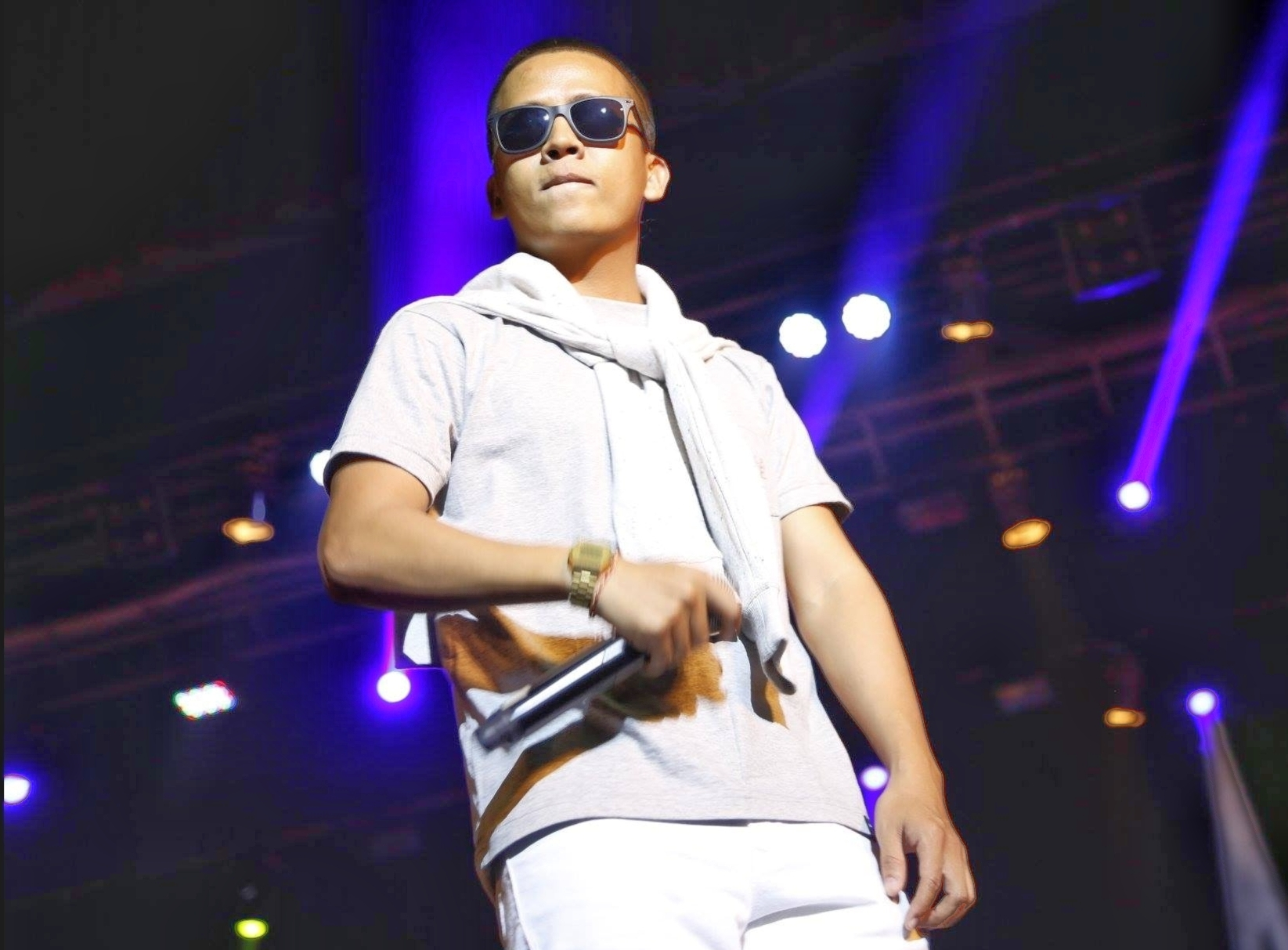
- Yan Yan Chan performing in a concert in 2019

Background information
- Born: 5 December 1979 (age 45); Yangon, Myanmar
- Genres: hip hop
- Occupation(s): Singer-songwriter, rapper, pro-democracy activist
- Years active: 2000–present
- Member of: Acid

Yan Yan Chan (Burmese: ရန်ရန်ချမ်း, pronounced [jàɰ̃ jàɰ̃ tɕʰáɰ̃]; born 5 December 1979) is a Burmese hip hop singer, pioneer of Burmese hip hop, and pro-democracy activist. He is a founding member of Acid, Burma's first hip hop group. He is also one of the coaches from The Voice Myanmar, a reality television singing competition.

== Early life and education ==
Yan Yan Chan was born on 5 December 1979 in Yangon, Myanmar to parents Thant Zin and his wife Khin Mu. He is the elder of two children, having a younger sister Suzan Nway. He attended high school at Basic Education High School No. 6 Botataung.

== "Beginning" ==
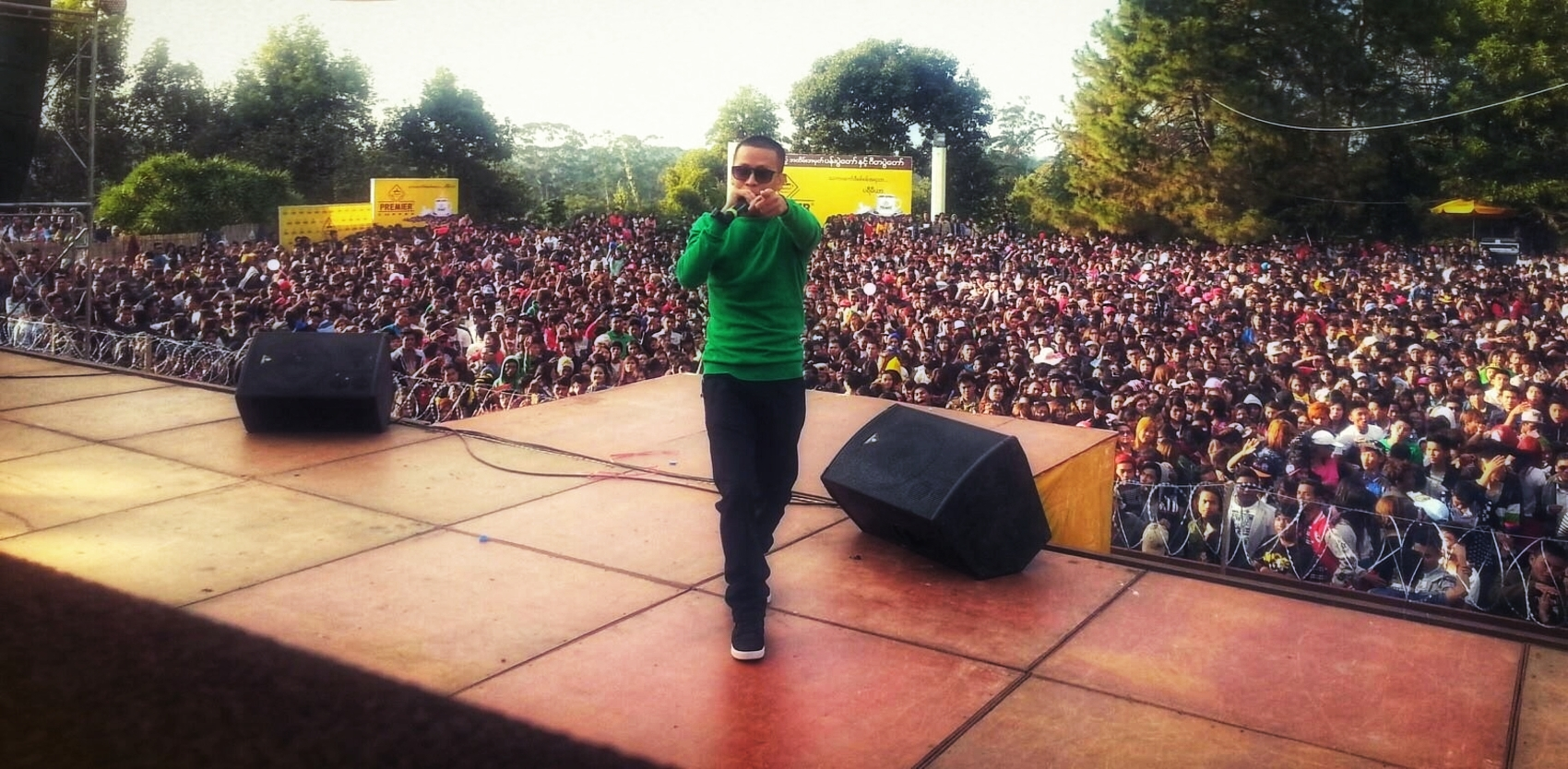
Yan Yan Chan performing at a concert in Yangon

In 2000, Acid released Burma's first hip-hop album. Despite predictions of failure by many in the Burmese music industry, the album, Beginning, remained in the number one position of the Burmese charts for more than two months. A Democratic Voice of Burma reporter described his music as blending a "combative, angry style with indigenous poeticism". The band's repertoire has been said to contain many "thinly veiled attacks on the regime". The Independent stated that while the band "focused on the mundane, their lyrics inevitably touched on the hardships of life in Burma, drawing them into dangerous territory."

== Political activism ==
Following the 2007 uprising against the State Peace and Development Council, Burma's military rulers, Yan Yan Chan's bandmate Phyo Zeya Thaw helped found the pro-democracy youth movement Generation Wave. Though not an original founder, Yan Yan Chan became involved in the group as well. Generation Wave used graffiti and pamphlets to spread messages opposing the SPDC. and distributed bumper stickers reading "Change New Government" to apply to cars carrying "CNG" stickers (originally for "compressed natural gas"). The group also circulated anti-government films, including Rambo, in which the titular character battles Tatmadaw (Burmese military) soldiers in Karen State. The film had been banned by the government for portraying the SPDC and its soldiers in a negative light.

In March 2008, several Generation Wave members were arrested for their anti-government activities, including Phyo Zeya Thaw, who was charged with membership in an illegal organization and possession of foreign currency. On 18 April, Yan Yan Chan was also arrested in the Upper Burma town of Monywa, reportedly along with his longtime girlfriend Chilli. Reporters Without Borders speculated that Yan Yan Chan was arrested due to "lyrics in some of his songs referring to the lack of press freedom". After nearly a year's detention, he was released without charges on 7 January 2009.

Following the 2021 Myanmar coup d'état, Yan Yan Chan was active in the anti-coup movement both in person at rallies and through social media. Denouncing the military coup, he has taken part in protests since February. He joined the "We Want Justice" three-finger salute movement. The movement was launched on social media, and many celebrities have joined the movement.

On 4 April 2021, warrants for his arrest were issued under section 505 (a) of the penal code by the State Administration Council for speaking out against the military coup. Along with several other celebrities, he was charged with calling for participation in the Civil Disobedience Movement (CDM) and damaging the state's ability to govern, with supporting the Committee Representing Pyidaungsu Hluttaw, and with generally inciting the people to disturb the peace and stability of the nation.

== Family ==
In March 2010, Yan Yan Chan and Chilli announced their intention to wed. On 4 April, they got married in a ceremony at the Traders Hotel in Yangon. Chilli gave birth to their first son in the same year.
