= Timeline of Yangon =

The following is a timeline of the history of the city of Yangon, Myanmar.

== Prior to 19th century ==
- 6th century CE - Dagon village founded by the Mon people.
- 7th century - Town conquered by King Punnarika of Pegu, renamed "Aramana."
- 1362 - Binnya U raised the height of Shwedagon Pagoda
- 1364 - Mon Princess Maha Dewi, a sister of King Binnya U became Governor of Dagon.
- 1413 - Town occupied by Burmans.
- 1415 - Mon Prince Binnya Set became Governor of Dagon.
- 1460 - Palace built by Mon Queen Shin Sawbu.
- 1484 - Great Bell of Dhammazedi presented.
- 1583 - Italian merchant, Gasparo Balbi visits.
- 1755 - Dagon captured by Burman King Alaungpaya and renamed "Yangon."
- 1756 - Between 1756 and 1759 Alaungpaya appointed Mon Governor of Yangon, Smim Noradecha (Ma Pu) joins Mon rebellion (approximate date).
- 1768 - Earthquake.
- 1790 - The Mon people (also known as Peguans) in power.
- 1790s - British East India Company factory in business (approximate date).

== 19th century ==
- 1823
  - Population: 30,000 (estimate).
  - Guanyin Gumiao Temple built
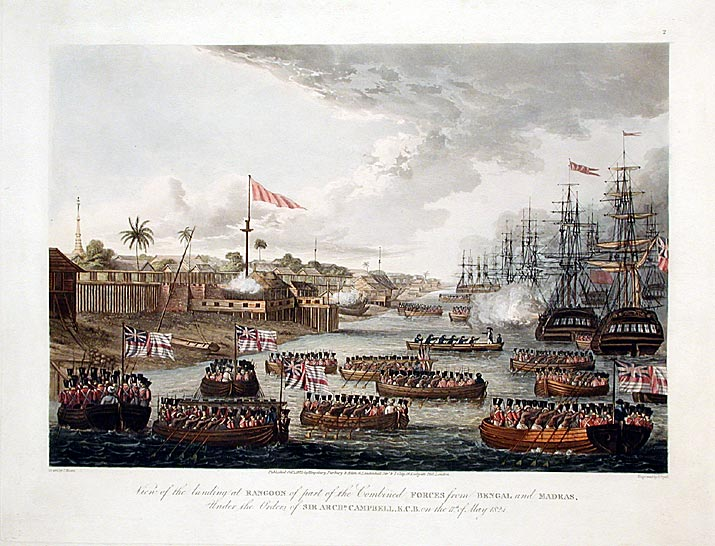
- Battle of Rangoon
  1824 - Battle of Rangoon
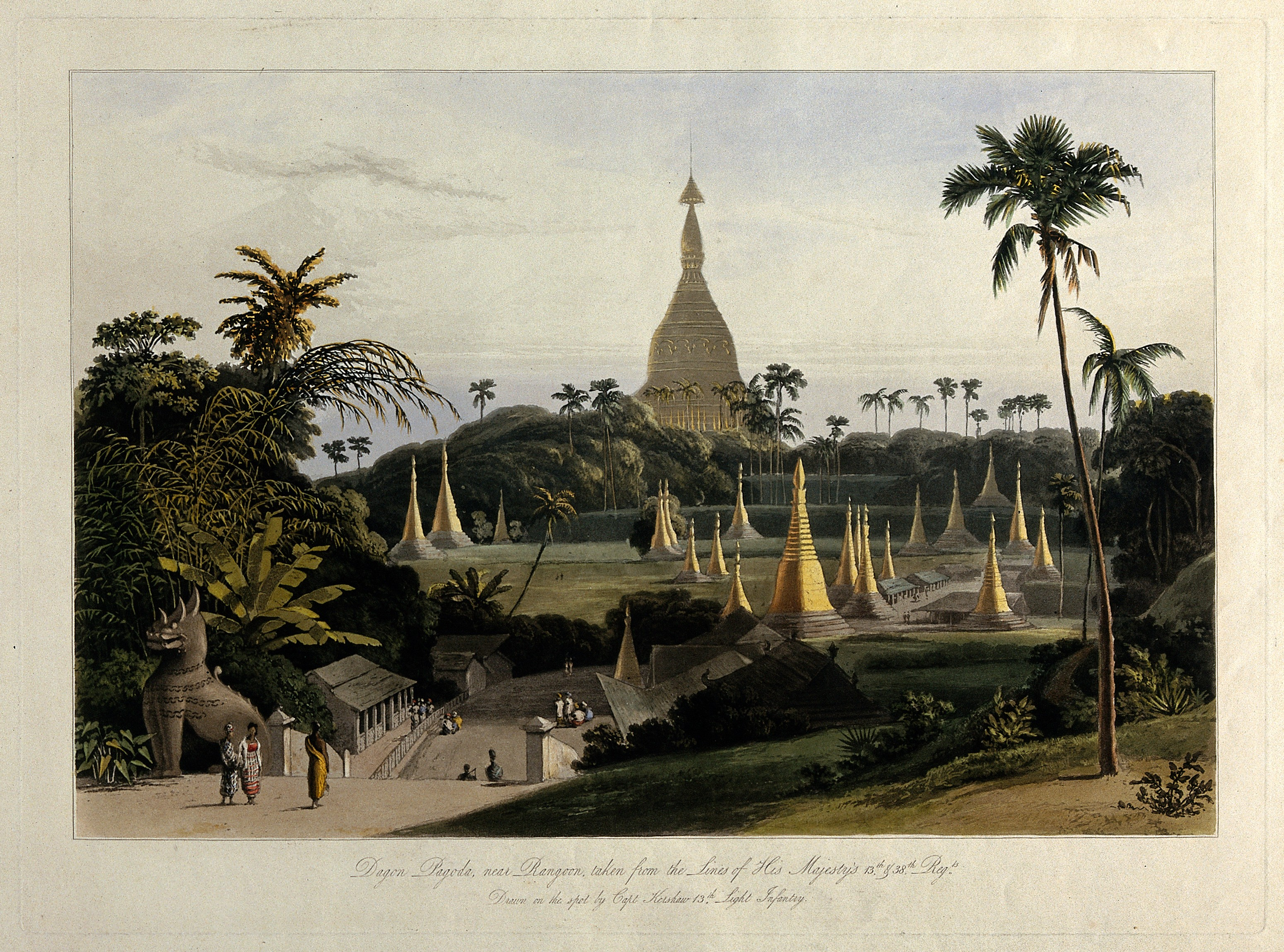
  Shwedagon Pagoda. Coloured aquatint by William Daniell after James Kershaw, c. 1831
- 1825 - British in power.
- 1827 - British occupation ends per Treaty of Yandabo.
- 1841 - King Tharrawaddy in residence; city wall built.
- 1850 - Fire.
- 1852
  - April: Second Anglo-Burmese War begins; British in power.
  - City becomes capital of British Burma.
- 1853 - Port of Rangoon established.
- 1854 - Rangoon Chronicle begins publication.
- 1855
  - A Mon noble named Maung Khaing becomes the first Magistrate of Yangon (Rangoon)
  - Maung Htaw Lay (former Mon governor of Dala) restores Shwedagon Pagoda
- 1857 - BI Steam Navigation Company starts Calcutta-Rangoon-Moulmein service.
- 1860 - St. Paul's English High School established.
- 1861 - Kheng Hock Keong built
- 1868 - Irrawaddy Flotilla Company starts Rangoon-Mandalay service.
- 1872
  - Population: 98,745.
  - Baptist College opens.
- 1874 - 31 July: Municipality constituted.
- 1875 - Fushan Temple built.
- 1876 - City area expanded.
- 1877
  - Railway begins operating.
  - Central Railway Station built.
  - Long Shan Tang Temple built.
- 1878 - Rangoon College established.
- 1879 - City "separated from Hathawaddy District."
- 1881 - Population: 134,176.
- 1882 - Methodist Episcopal Girls School founded.
- 1883
  - Inya Lake created.
  - Twante Canal opens.
- 1887 - Dufferin Hospital opens
- 1888 - Income tax established.
- 1891 - Population: 181,210.
- 1893 - June: Riot.
- 1899
  - General Hospital founded.
  - Saint Mary's Cathedral built.

== 20th century ==
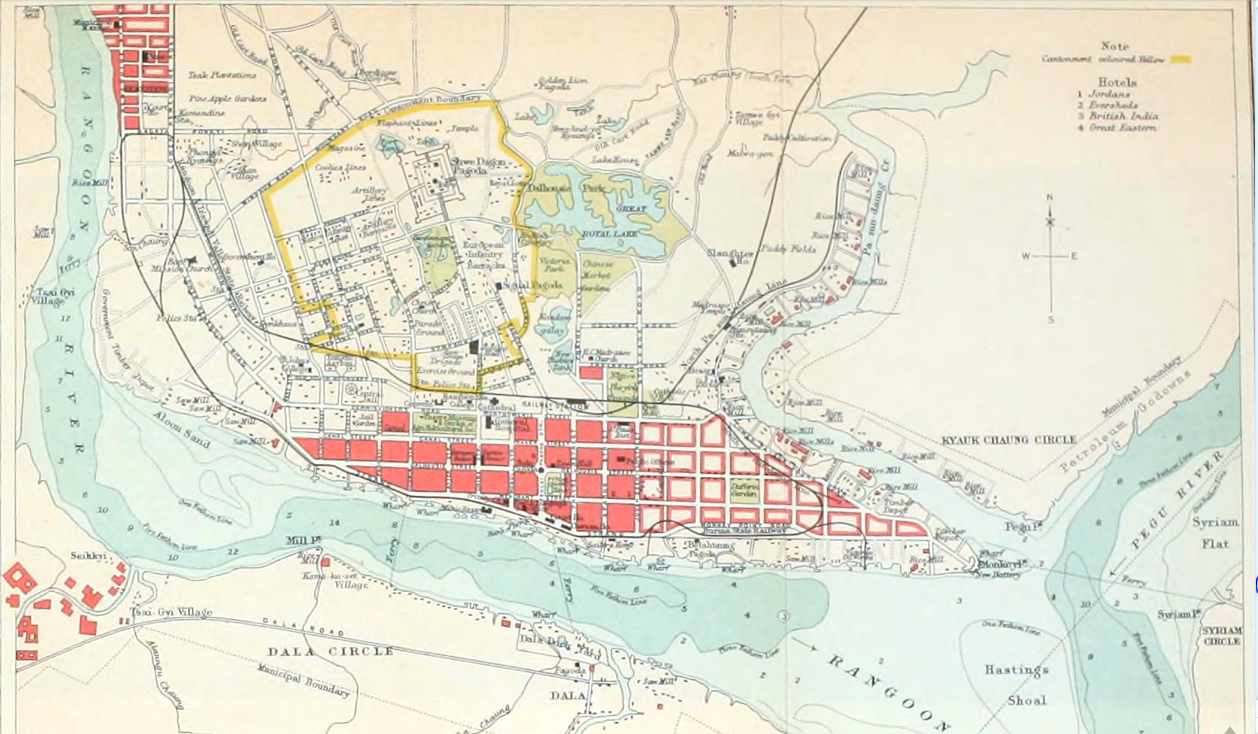
Map of Rangoon, 1911

- 1901
  - Strand Hotel opens.
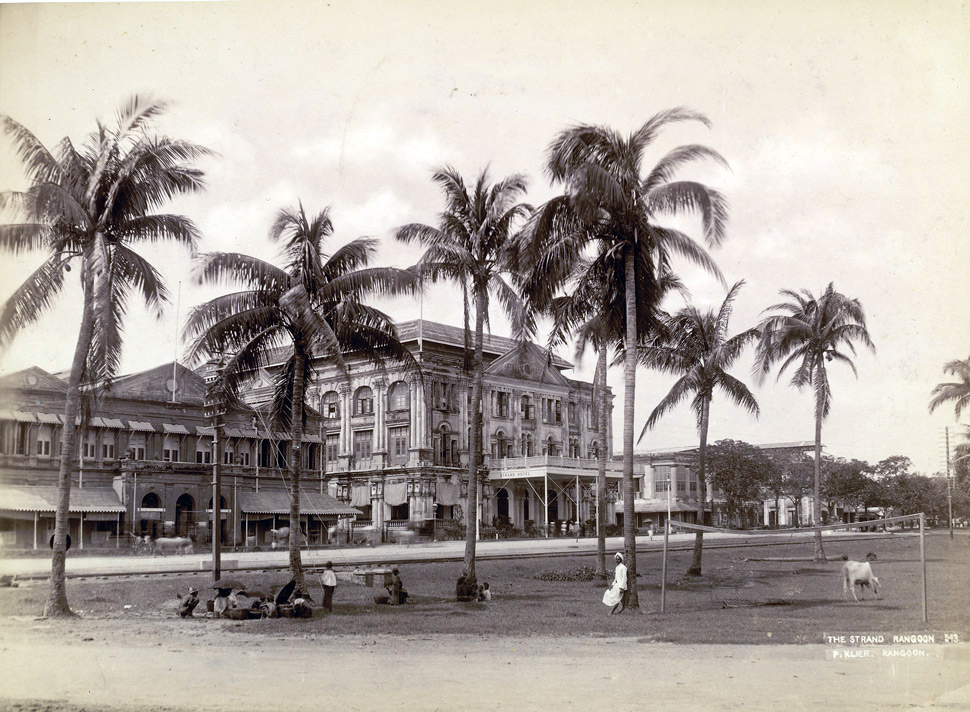
  - The Strand Hotel, Rangoon
    Population: 234,881.
- 1902 - Secretariat Building constructed.
- 1906 - Victoria Memorial Park and Zoological Gardens opens.
- 1907 - Chaukhtatgyi Buddha Temple built.
- 1911 - High Court building constructed.
- 1912 - Gymkhana Ground (cricket) in use.
- 1913 - Burma Art Club founded (approximate date).
- 1914 - Myanma Alin (New Light of Myanmar) newspaper begins.
- 1915 - Lim Chin Tsong Palace built (approximate date).
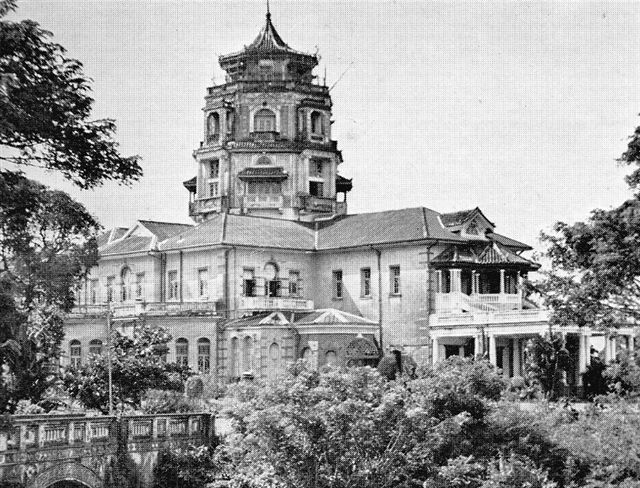
  Lim Chin Tsong Palace
- 1920
  - Myoma National High School founded.
  - Governor's Residence built.
- 1921 - City boundaries expanded.
- 1922 - City incorporated.
- 1926 - Scott's Market built.
- 1927
  - BOC College of Engineering and Mining established.
  - Medical school building constructed.
- 1930
  - Richard Rushall elected as mayor of Rangoon
  - Race riots in Rangoon
  - Earthquake kills over 550 people.
- 1931 - Population: 398,967.
- 1936 - Yangon City Hall built.
- 1937 - City becomes capital of Burma.
- 1938 - Race riots in Rangoon
- 1942 - Japanese occupation begins.
- 1943
  - Biruma Shinbun newspaper begins publication.
  - 8 November: Bombing destroys Botataung Pagoda.
  - U Wisara Monument erected.
- 1945 - Japanese occupation ends.
- 1947 - Airport built.
- 1948 - 4 January: City becomes capital of the independent Union of Burma.
- 1952
  - National Museum of the Union of Burma opens.
  - Kaba Aye Pagoda built.
- 1953 - Population: 711,520.
- 1957 - Kyemon newspaper begins publication.
- 1958 - The Botataung newspaper begins publication.
- 1960
  - Population: 1,284,642.
  - Yangon Children's Hospital opens
- 1961
  - May - South Okkalapa Maternal and Child Hospital opens
  - December- 2nd South East Asian Games held
- 1962
  - 7 July - Government guns down student protesters.
  - Bogyoke Aung San Museum established.
- 1963 - Medical College 2 opens
- 1964 - Institute of Foreign Languages (IFL) opens
- 1967 - 26 June: "Anti-Chinese riot."
- 1968 - Planetarium established.
- 1969 - 5th South East Asian Games
- 1972 - Karaweik built
- 1973 - Population: 2,055,365 (approximate).
- 1974 - Government guns down student protesters following U Thant's death
- 1980 - Maha Wizaya Pagoda built.
- 1983
  - 9 October: Bombing at Martyrs' Mausoleum.
  - Population: 2,513,023.
- 1984 - New Yangon General Hospital opens
- 1985 - Thuwunna Stadium opens.
- 1988
  - 8 August: 8888 Uprising.
  - State Law and Order Restoration Council headquartered in city.
  - Ko Lay becomes mayor.
- 1989 - City renamed "Yangon."
- 1990
  - Yangon City Development Committee established.
  - Bayinnaung Market established
- 1991 - National Theatre of Yangon opens.
- 1992 - Asia World Group conglomerate headquartered in city.
- 1993 - Dagon University opens
- 1994 - Thingangyun Sanpya Hospital opens
- 1996 - Myanmar Securities Exchange established.
- 1998 - Myanmar Motion Picture Museum established.
- 1999 - Sakura Tower opens.

== 21st century ==
- 2001 - Yangon City FM radio begins broadcasting.
- 2002 - Kyauktawgyi Buddha Temple (Yangon) opens.
  - October 1: Birth of Steven Wai Yan
- 2005
  - May: May 2005 Yangon bombings
  - November: National capital relocated from Yangon to Naypyidaw.
- 2007
  - September: Anti-government protests led by monks; crackdown.
  - Yangon International Airport terminal built.
- 2008
  - 2 May: Cyclone Nargis.
  - September: Explosion near City Hall.
- 2009 - Yangon United Football Club formed.
- 2010
  - 16 April: April 2010 Yangon Thingyan bombings
  - Population: 4,348,000.
- 2011
  - Hla Myint becomes mayor.
  - 2011 Yangon explosion
- 2012
  - February: Shwedagon Pagoda Festival resumes.
  - Yangon Heritage Trust begins
- 2013
  - January: Marathon held.
  - April: School fire.
  - December: Some events of 27th Southeast Asian Games take place.
- 2014 - Population: 4,575,155 (2014 census); 5,211,431 (urban agglomeration).
- 2015 - Yangon Stock Exchange begins
- 2017 - Yangon Bus Service begins
- 2020
  - 27 March: first COVID-19 case in Yangon

== See also ==
- Yangon history
- Yangon City Heritage List
- List of name changes in Yangon
- List of mayors of Yangon
- List of universities and colleges in Yangon
- List of hospitals in Yangon
- List of districts and neighborhoods of Yangon

== Bibliography ==
Published in the 19th century

- Jedidiah Morse; Richard C. Morse (1823), "Rangoon", A New Universal Gazetteer (4th ed.), New Haven: S. Converse
- "Rangoon". Wright's Australian and American Commercial Directory and Gazetteer. New York. 1881.
- George Smith (1882), "Rangoon", Geography of British India, Political & Physical, London: J. Murray, OCLC 5876009
- Edward Balfour (1885), "Rangoon", The Cyclopaedia of India and of Eastern and Southern Asia (3rd ed.), London: B. Quaritch

Published in the 20th century

- "Rangoon". Imperial Guide to India, Including Kashmir, Burma and Ceylon. London: John Murray. 1904.
- Richard Barrett Talbot Kelly (1905), "Rangoon", Burma, painted and described, London: Adam and Charles Black, OCLC 5057234
- "Rangoon City", Imperial Gazetteer of India, Oxford: Clarendon Press (published 1908), 1907
- "Rangoon", A Handbook for Travellers in India, Burma, and Ceylon (8th ed.), London: John Murray, 1911
- C. Morgan Webb (1923). "Development of Rangoon". Town Planning Review. 10 (1). UK: 37–42. doi:10.3828/tpr.10.1.x422054153188814. JSTOR 40101637.
- B. R. Pearn (1939), A History of Rangoon, Rangoon: American Baptist Mission Press
- Scott, James George (1910). "Rangoon" . Encyclopædia Britannica. Vol. 22 (11th ed.).
- O. H. K. Spate; L. W. Trueblood (1942). "Rangoon: A Study in Urban Geography". Geographical Review. 32 (1). American Geographical Society: 56–73. Bibcode:1942GeoRv..32...56S. doi:10.2307/210359. JSTOR 210359.
- Noel F. Singer (1995), Old Rangoon: City of the Shwedagon, Scotland: Paul Stachan - Kiscadale, ISBN 1870838475
- Schellinger and Salkin, ed. (1996). "Yangon". International Dictionary of Historic Places: Asia and Oceania. UK: Routledge. ISBN 9781884964046.
- Than Than Nwe (1998). "Yangon: The Emergence of a New Spatial Order in Myanmar's Capital City". Sojourn: Journal of Social Issues in Southeast Asia. 13 (1): 86–113. JSTOR 41056978.
- Mira Kamdar (1999). "Rangoon: A Remembrance of Things Past". World Policy Journal. 16 (3): 89–109. JSTOR 40209649.

Published in the 21st century

- Helen James (2004). "Rangoon". In Ooi Keat Gin (ed.). Southeast Asia: A Historical Encyclopedia. ABC-CLIO. ISBN 1576077705.
- Donald M. Seekins (2005). "The State and the City: 1988 and the Transformation of Rangoon". Pacific Affairs. 78.
- Frauke Kraas; Hartmut Gaese; Mi Mi Kyi, eds. (2006). Megacity Yangon. Berlin: Lit Verlag. ISBN 3825800423.
