= Chinese people in Myanmar =

People of Han Chinese descent in Myanmar

Burmese Chinese
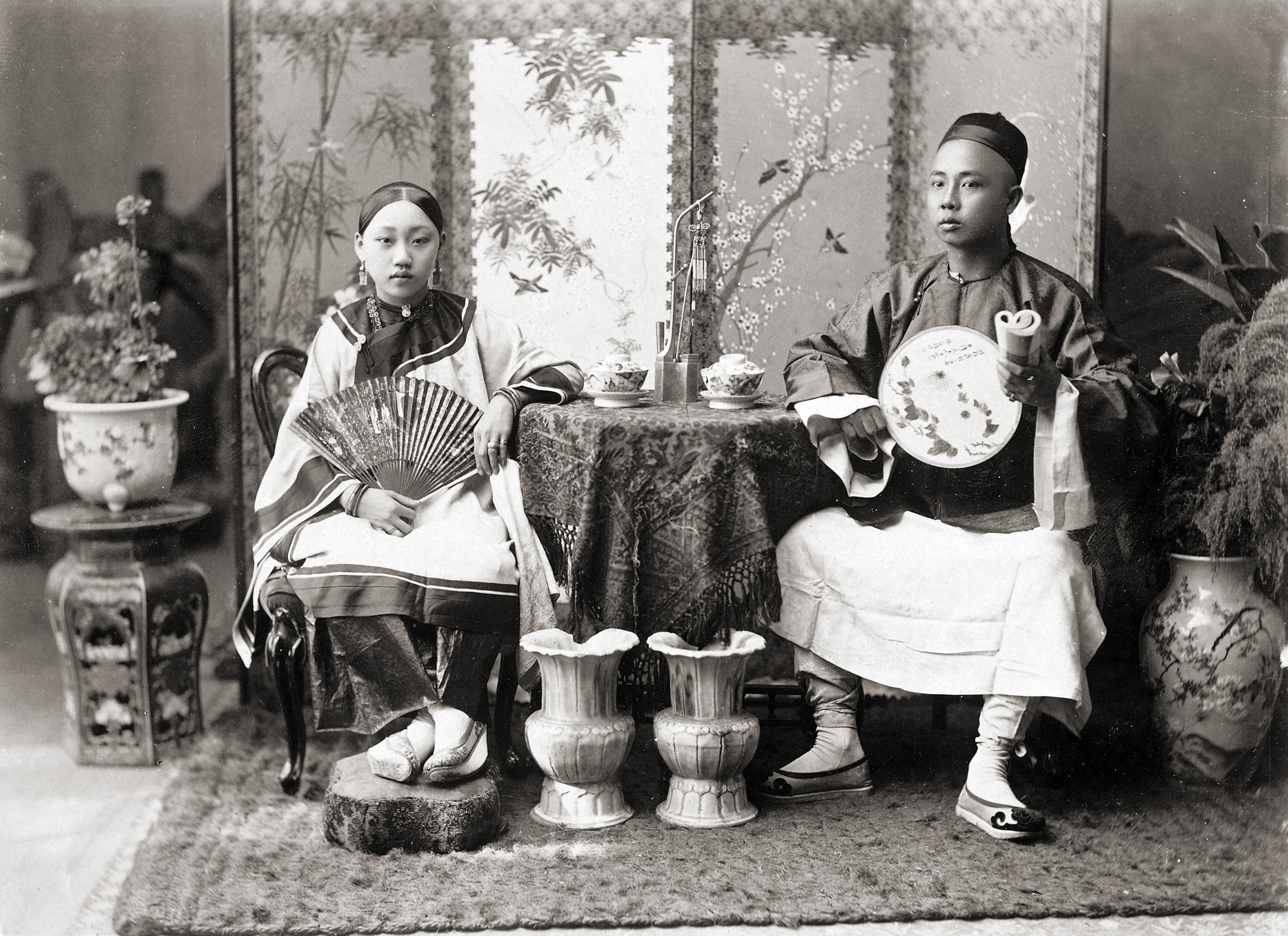
- A Sino-Burmese merchant and his wife in British Raj Rangoon in 1895

Total population
- 1,637,540 (2012)

Regions with significant populations
- Yangon; Mandalay; Taunggyi; Kokang; Lashio; Myitkyina; Myeik

Languages
- Burmese; Yunnanese Mandarin; Hokkien; Cantonese; Hakka; Standard Chinese

Religion
- Theravada Buddhism; Mahayana Buddhism; Taoism; Confucianism; Christianity; Islam

Related ethnic groups
- Kokang • Panthays: Overseas Chinese

Chinese people in Myanmar
- Traditional Chinese: 緬甸華人
- Simplified Chinese: 缅甸华人
Transcriptions
Standard Mandarin
- Hanyu Pinyin: Miǎndiàn huárén
Hakka
- Pha̍k-fa-sṳ: Mién-thien fà-ngìn
Yue: Cantonese
- Yale Romanization: Míhndihn wàyàn
Southern Min
- Hokkien POJ: Biān-tián hôa-jîn

Alternative Chinese name
- Traditional Chinese: 緬甸華僑
- Simplified Chinese: 缅甸华侨
Transcriptions
Standard Mandarin
- Hanyu Pinyin: Miǎndiàn huáqiáo
Hakka
- Pha̍k-fa-sṳ: Mién-thien fà-kiaau
Yue: Cantonese
- Yale Romanization: Míhndihn wàkìu
Southern Min
- Hokkien POJ: Biān-tián hôa-kiâu

Burmese name
- Burmese: မြန်မာတရုတ်လူမျိုး

Burmese Chinese, also Sino-Burmese or Tayoke (Burmese: တရုတ်), are Burmese citizens of Han Chinese ethnicity. They are a group of overseas Chinese born or raised in Myanmar (Burma).

Burmese Chinese are a well established ethnic group and are well represented in all upper levels of Burmese society. They play a leading role in Burma's business sector and dominate the Burmese economy. They also have a strong presence in Burma's political scene with several having been major political figures, including San Yu and Khin Nyunt.

== Etymology ==
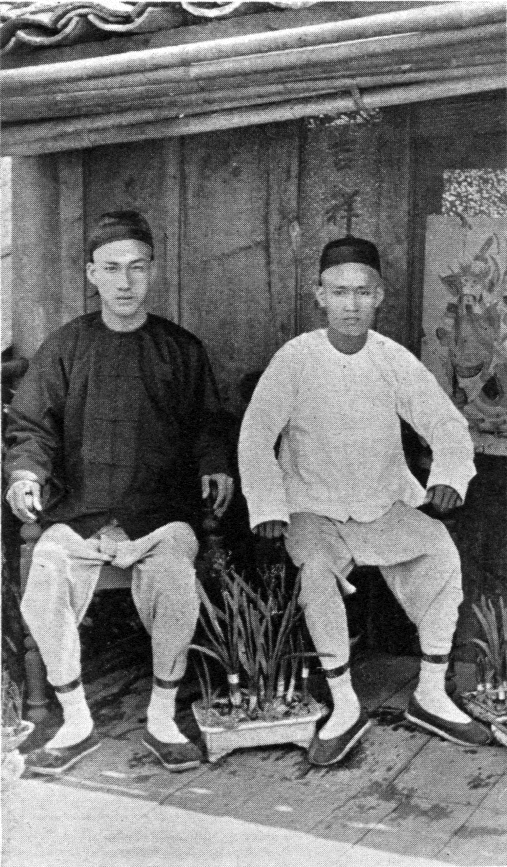
Chinese in Bhamo, 1900

In the Burmese language, the Chinese are called Tayoke (တရုတ်, tarut, pronounced [təjoʊʔ]) and formerly spelt တရုပ် (tarup). The earliest evidence of this term dates to the Bagan Era, in the 13th century, during which it referred to the territory and a variety of peoples to the north and northeast of Myanmar. Various scholars have proposed that it comes from the Chinese term for "Turk" (突厥, Tūjué / tú jué); from the name of Dali Kingdom (大理國, Dàlǐguó); a Chinese corruption of the term Dàyuèzhī (大月支 or 大月氏), a Chinese term referring to Mongol-speaking Kushan Huns. The adoption of Tayoke as an exonym for the Han Chinese was not an established practice until the 19th century.

In the 1940s and 1950s, the term paukphaw (ပေါက်ဖော်, lit. 'sibling') was co-opted as an affectionate term for the Chinese and is now typically used in the context of diplomatic ties between China and Myanmar. The term itself purportedly originates from a Burmese myth about the Chinese and Burmese peoples as being descendants of the same parents, a dragon princess and a sun god.

In the Mon language, the Chinese are known as Krawk (ကြုက်, /krɜk/); in Shan, they are called Khe (ၶႄႇ, /kʰɛ˨/). In the Wa language, spoken in the borderlands between Yunnan Province and Shan State, the word for Chinese is Hox/Hawx, pronounced /hɔʔ/.

== Ancestral origins ==
The Hakkas, Hokkiens and Cantonese comprised 45 per cent of the ethnic Chinese population. The Yunnanese comprised 30 to 40 per cent of the ethnic Chinese population.

=== Hokkien ===
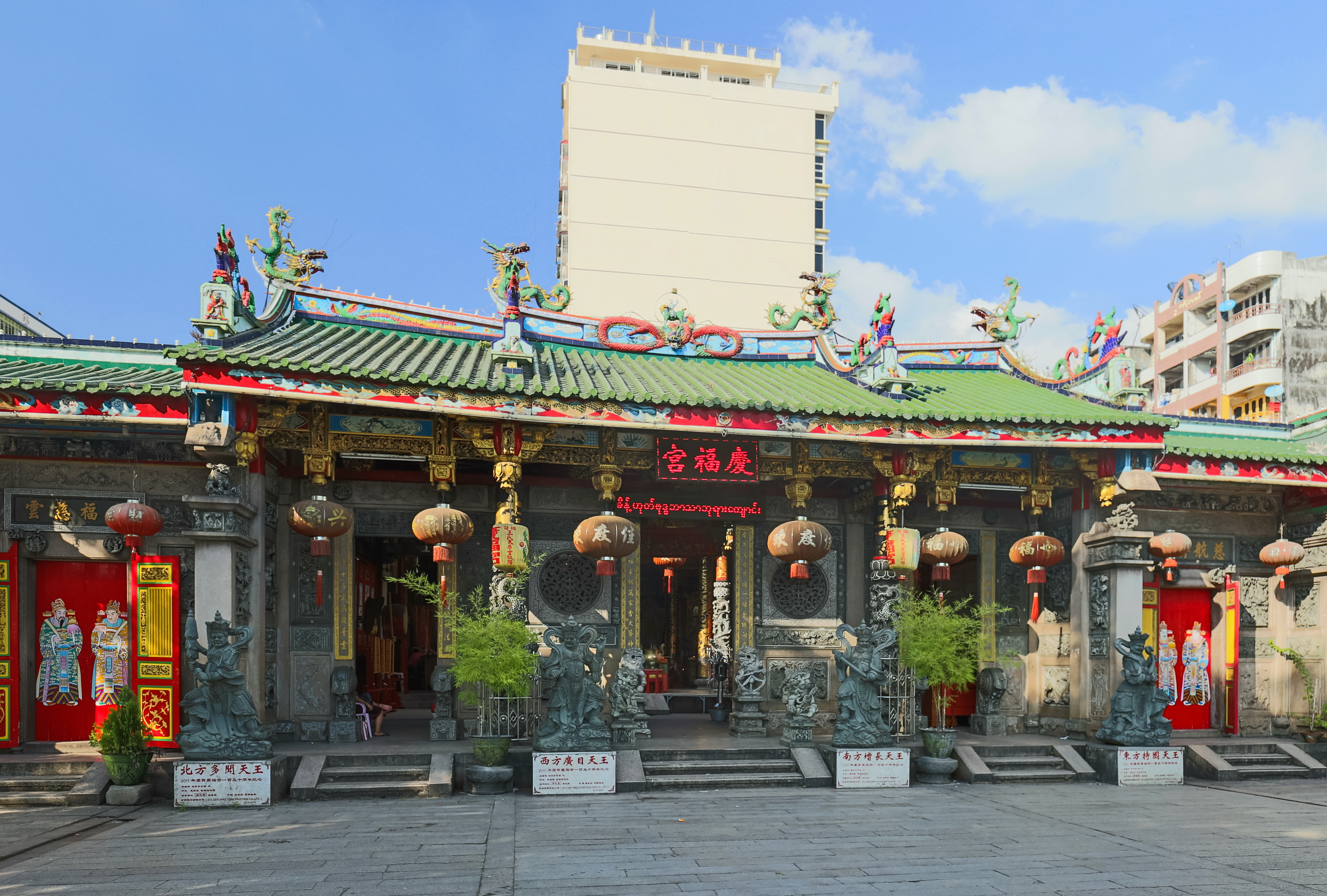
Hokkien Chinese temple, Kheng Hock Keong Temple in Latha Township, Yangon

- Hokkiens (Burmese: eingyi shay, အင်္ကျီရှည် or let shay, လက်ရှည်, lit. 'long-sleeved jackets') from Fujian Province. Most of the Hokkien were traders, bankers and brokers.

=== Cantonese ===
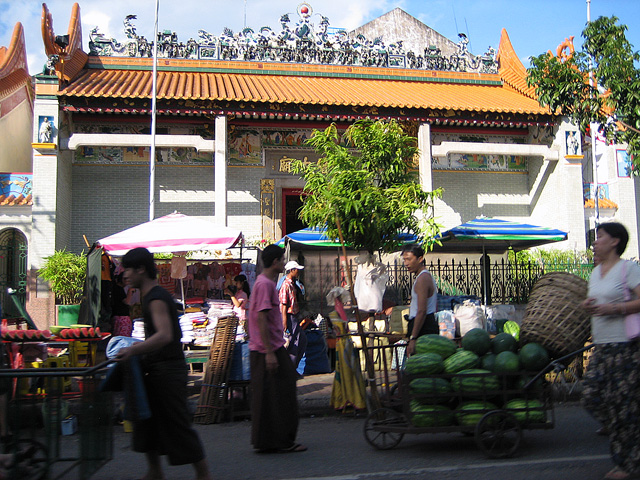
The Cantonese Chinese founded the Kwun Yam Temple in Latha Township, Yangon

- Cantonese (Burmese: eingyi to, အင်္ကျီတို or let to, လက်တို, lit. 'short-sleeved jackets') from Central Guangdong Province. Most migrants from Guangdong Province were artisans.

=== Hakkas ===
- Hakkas (Burmese: zaka, စက, lit. 'mid-length') from Fujian and Guangdong provinces.

The Hakkas are further subdivided into those with ancestry from Fujian Province and Guangdong Province, called eingyi shay haka (အင်္ကျီရှည်ဟကာ) and eingyi to haka (အင်္ကျီတိုဟကာ) respectively.

=== Kokang ===
According to the Ministry of Immigration and Population of Myanmar, Kokang people are officially recognized as one of the 135 ethnic groups of Myanmar, listed as a subgroup under the Shan state national race. In Upper Myanmar and Shan Hills, the Kokang people predominate there.

=== Panthay ===
The Panthay have long been considered distinct from the Han Chinese diaspora community. They are Chinese Muslims who are called Hui in China.

Finally, there are the tayoke kabya (တရုတ်ကပြား) of mixed Chinese and indigenous Burmese parentage. The kabya (ကပြား, meaning "hybrid") have a tendency to follow the customs of the Chinese more than of the Burmese. Indeed, tayoke kabya who follow Burmese customs are absorbed into and largely indistinguishable from mainstream Burmese society. A large portion of Burmese Chinese is thought to have some kabya blood, possibly because immigrants could acquire Burmese citizenship through intermarriage with the indigenous Burmese peoples.

== History ==
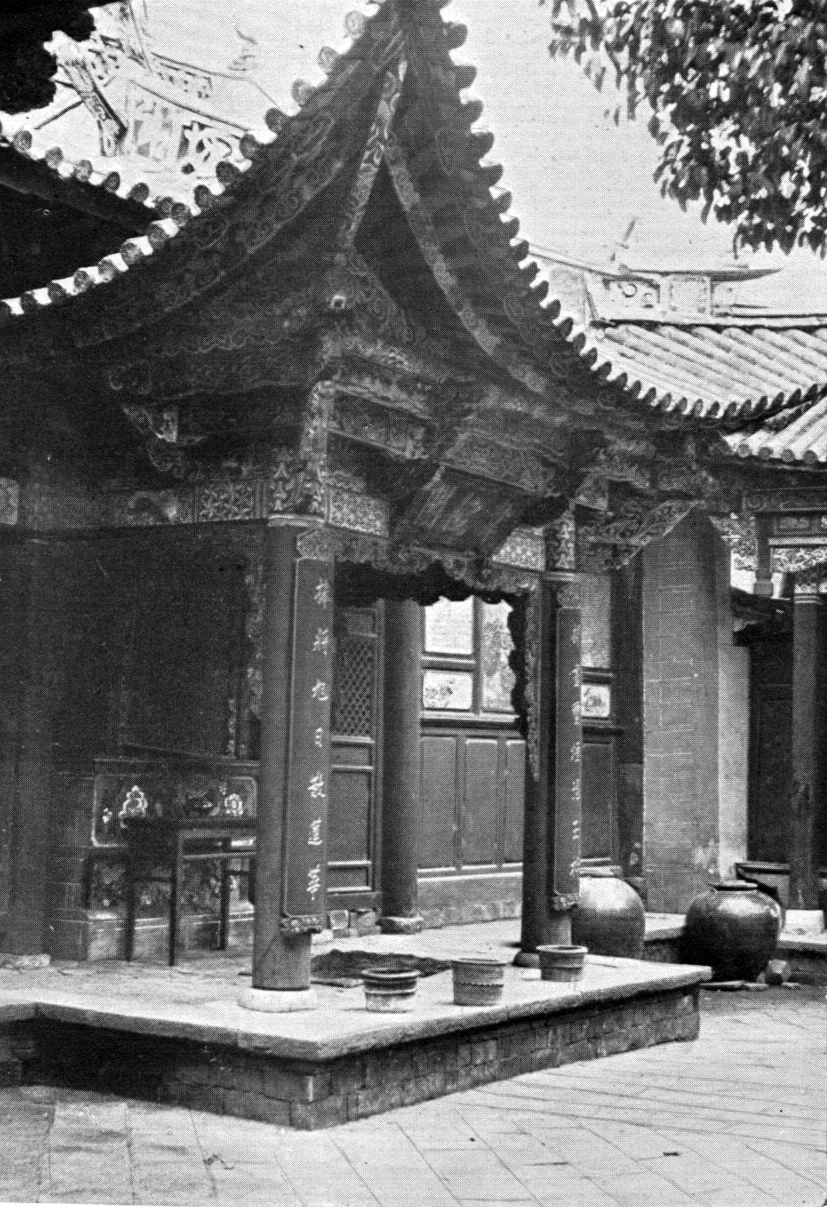
A Joss house in Bhamo (Bamaw)

=== Pre-colonial ===
The earliest records of Chinese migration into present-day Myanmar were in the Song and Ming dynasties. In the 18th century, Ming dynasty princes settled in Kokang (the northern part of present-day Myanmar). Chinese traders, however, travelled as far as the capital city as well as northern towns on the Irrawaddy such as Bhamo. Some of them stayed and started a Chinese community at Amarapura, and when King Mindon moved his capital to Mandalay in 1859, the Chinese were the only community that decided to stay behind. Many of their descendants intermarried into the host society and remain important and respected citizens of Amarapura.

=== British Colonial period ===
Another wave of immigration occurred in the 19th century under the British colonial administration. Britain encouraged immigration of the Indians and Chinese to British Burma, and such incentives for work opportunities and enterprise and for accumulating wealth attracted many Chinese immigrants. They came to Burma primarily via British Malaya. The Chinese quickly became dominant in the highly lucrative rice and gem industries. Many Chinese merchants and traders owning both wholesale and retail businesses. Unlike in British Malaya, where most Chinese were coolie labourers, the Chinese in Burma were largely from the artisan and merchant classes.

They integrated well into Burmese society not least because they, like the Bamar, were of Sino-Tibetan stock and were Buddhists, implicit in the nickname pauk hpaw (ပေါက်ဖော်, lit. "sibling"). During British rule, marriage between the Chinese and Burmese, particularly Chinese men and Burmese women, was the most common form of intermarriage in Burma, as evidenced by a High Court ruling on the legal status of Sino-Burmese marriages under Burmese Buddhist law. From 1935 until the end of British rule, the Chinese were represented in the colonial legislature, the House of Representatives.

After World War II, displaced Burmese Chinese (whose pre-war homes were in Burma), were the most numerous group of overseas Chinese in Southeast Asia to request repatriation to return to Burma, according to the United Nations Relief and Rehabilitation Administration.

=== Post-independence ===
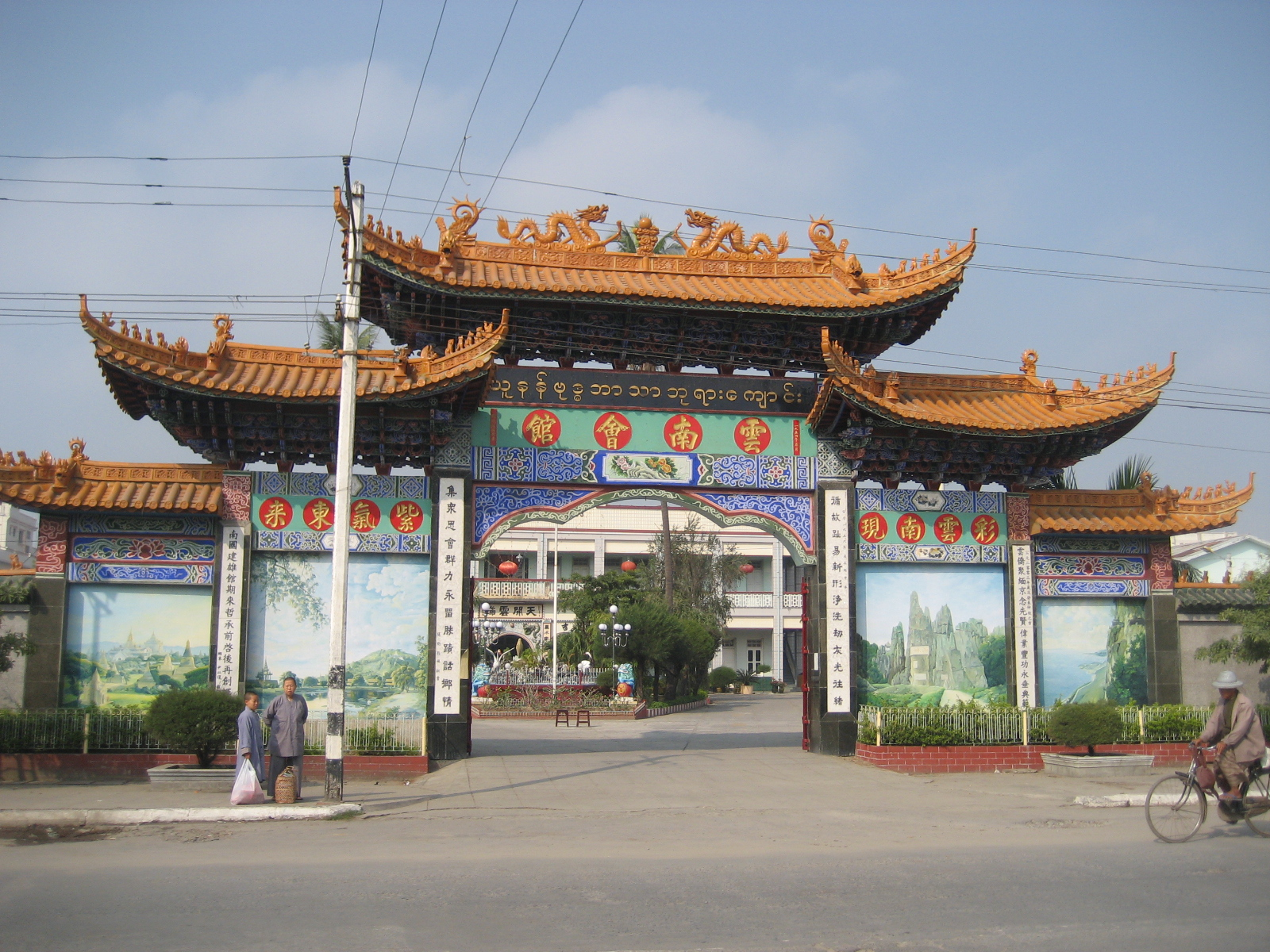
The Yunnanese Buddhist Temple and Association in Mandalay is a major Chinese temple in the city.

During the 1950s, Burma was one of the first countries to recognise the People's Republic of China as a nation. However, its own Chinese population was treated as aliens. The Burmese Chinese were issued foreign registration cards (FRC) in a tiered citizenship system adopted by the post-independence government. When the Chinese Communists expelled the Kuomintang, many fled to Myanmar and Thailand over the borders of Yunnan Province. The Burmese government fought and removed the armed KMT and forced them to Taiwan; those who managed to stay prospered. In the 1950s, discriminatory policies against overseas Chinese encompassed citizenship, government employment, approval for business regulations and licensing, loan extensions and permission to make remittances.

Within every Burmese city and town, stood Chinese-owned general merchandise stores as 40 percent of Burmese Chinese acted as merchants and traders across the country following the Second World War. Chinese-style bakeries and patisseries, noodle stalls, watch repair shops, cosmetic retailers, and grocery stores became focal points of economic life throughout small towns in Burma. With growing ambitions, Chinese immigrants sought more aggressive entrepreneurial and investment dealings by venturing into most profitable business opportunities, such as liquour stores and pawn brokerage houses.

In 1952, Kheng Hock Keong Temple publications estimated that ethnic Chinese, who lived in enclaves in the area along Sinohdan, Latha, and Maung Khaing Streets (with Cantonese typically living above Maha Bandula Road and Hokkiens living below), constituted 9.5 per cent of Rangoon's population. During this period, there was a sharp rise in the number of private Chinese language schools, primarily teaching Mandarin, in Burma, from 65 in 1935 to 259 in 1953 and 259 at its peak in 1962, with many such schools affiliated to the Chinese nationalist (တရုတ်ဖြူ, lit. "White Chinese") or communist (တရုတ်နီ, lit. "Red Chinese") movements. However, fewer than 10 per cent of Burmese Chinese of school age attended Chinese language schools. Similarly, about 80 clan associations operated in the 1950s.

=== Socialist rule ===
In 1962, Ne Win led a coup d'état, establishing the Revolutionary Council under the Burmese Way to Socialism. In February 1963, the Enterprise Nationalization Law was passed, effectively nationalising all major industries and prohibiting the formation of new factories. This law adversely affected many industrialists and entrepreneurs, especially those without the full citizenship. The government's economic nationalisation program further prohibited foreigners, including the non-citizen Chinese, from owning land, sending remittances, getting business licences and practising medicine. Such policies led to the beginnings of a major exodus of Burmese Chinese to other countries—some 100,000 Chinese left Burma.

Although a kabya himself, Ne Win banned Chinese-language education and created other measures to compel the Chinese to leave. Ne Win's government stoked up racial animosity and ethnic conflicts against the Indians and Chinese Burmese, who were terrorised by Burmese citizens, the most violent riots taking place in 1967. All schools were nationalised, including Chinese language schools. Beginning in 1967 and continuing throughout the 1970s, anti-Chinese riots as well as Anti-Indian sentiment continued to flare up and many believed they were covertly supported by the government. Similarly, Chinese shops were looted and set on fire. Public attention was successfully diverted by Ne Win from the uncontrollable inflation, scarcity of consumer items and rising prices of rice. The 1982 Citizenship Law further restricted Burmese citizenship for Burmese Chinese and severely limited them from attending professional tertiary schools. During this period, the country's failing economy and widespread discrimination accelerated an emigration of Burmese Chinese out of Burma.

=== Modern era ===
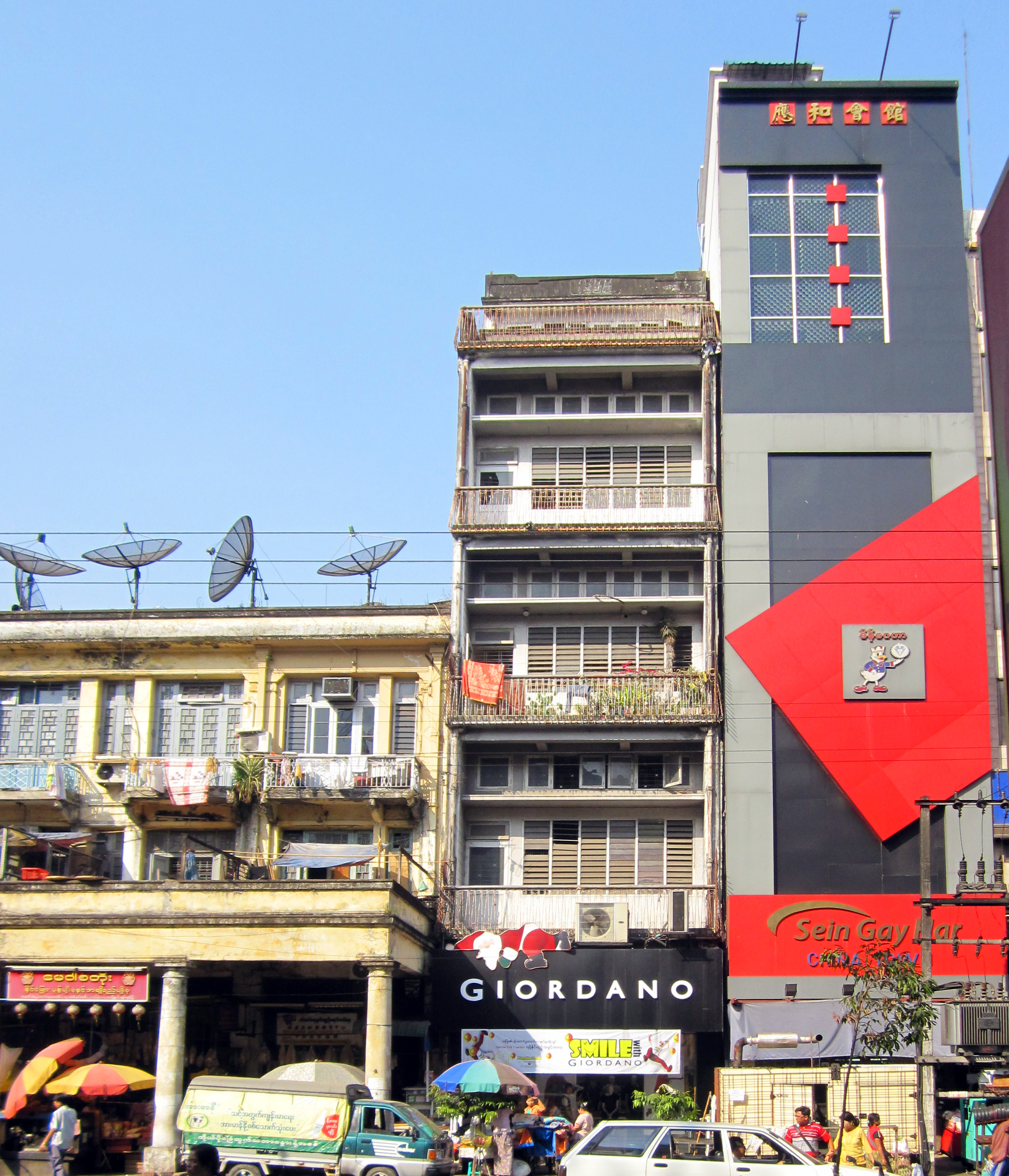
The Yangon Chinatown branch of the retailer Sein Gayha on Maha Bandula Rd near 20th Street also houses Hakka Ying Fo Fui Kun (應和會館), a Hakka Chinese clan association.

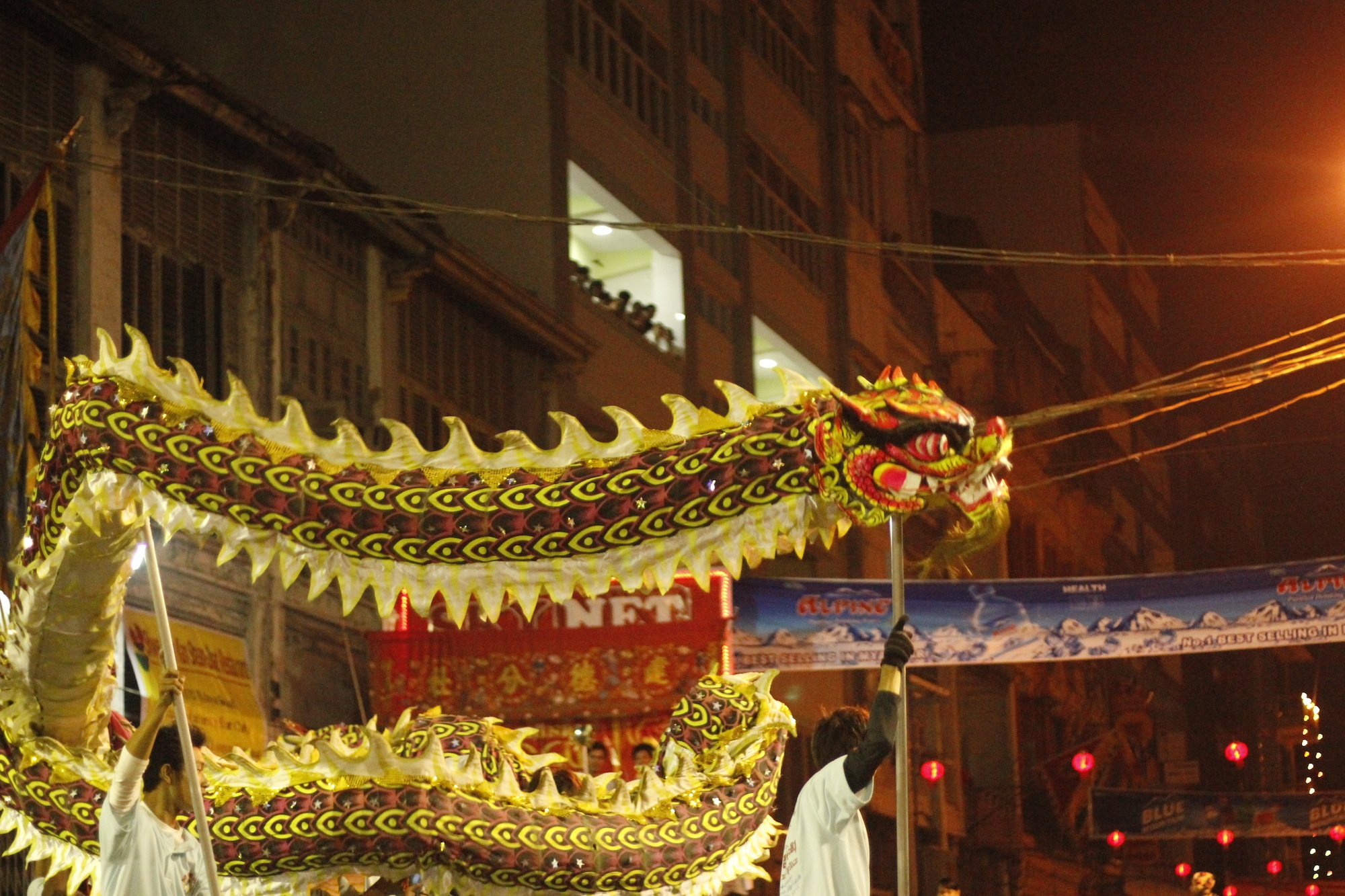
Chinese New Year festivities in Yangon's Chinatown in 2011

In 1988, the State Law and Order Restoration Council (SLORC) came to power, and gradually loosened the government's role in the economy, encouraging private sector growth and foreign investment. This liberalisation of state's role in the economy, if slight and uneven, nonetheless gave the ethnic Chinese-led businesses extra space to expand and reassert their economic power. Today, the majority of retail, wholesale and import trade businesses are run by the Burmese Chinese today.

Despite their status as alien minorities, the close relationship between the military rulers of Burma and the People's Republic of China led to the issues of Burmese Chinese being treated with more sensitivity. Furthermore, Beijing pushed reform for the Chinese disapora in the 1980s and Chinese companies tended to hire ethnic Chinese.

Today, the majority of Burmese Chinese live in the major cities of Yangon, Mandalay, Taunggyi, Bago, and their surrounding areas. Although there are Chinatowns (တရုတ်တန်း; tayoke tan) in the major cities, the Chinese are widely dispersed throughout the country. Yangon is home to nearly 100,000 Chinese. The northern region of Myanmar has seen a recent influx of mainland Chinese migrant workers, black market traders and gamblers. In Kachin State, which borders China in three directions, Standard Chinese is the lingua franca.

Upper Myanmar has seen a demographic shift resulting from the recent immigration of many mainland Chinese to Mandalay Region, Shan, and Kachin States. Ethnic Chinese now constitute an estimated 30 to 40 per cent of Mandalay's population. Huge swaths of land in city centre left vacant by the fires were later illegally purchased, mostly by the ethnic Chinese, many of whom were recent illegal immigrants from Yunnan. The Chinese influx accelerated after the current military government came to power in 1988. The government forcibly relocated local Burmese to satellite towns as part of a City Beautification and Development Program, allowing incoming Chinese immigrants access to land in central Mandalay. In the 1990s alone, about 250,000 to 300,000 Yunnanese were estimated to have migrated to Mandalay. The Mandalay's population from about 500,000 in 1980 to one million in 2008 and the percentage of local Burmese reduced to less than 50. Chinese festivals are now firmly embedded in the city's cultural calendar. Mainland Chinese immigrants into Mandalay of this time, came with capital to purchase prime real estate allowing them to take over central Mandalay during the economic crises of the early 1990s. The predominance of Chinese became a source of racial tensions between the two communities.

== Socioeconomics ==
=== Education ===
The Burmese Chinese place a high importance on education and represent a disproportionately high share of those with advanced (medical, engineering or doctorate) degrees in Myanmar. The figure would be higher still had it not been for the longstanding ban on those without Burmese citizenship from pursuing advanced degrees when Ne Win instigated the 1982 Citizenship Law further restricted Burmese citizenship for Burmese Chinese (as it stratified citizenship into three categories: full, associate, and naturalised) and severely limited Burmese Chinese, especially those without full citizenship and those holding FRCs, from attending professional tertiary schools, including medical, engineering, agricultural and economics institutions. But related to the nationalization and indigenization policies, while Chinese communities were significantly impacted, Indians faced even greater challenges. Many wealthy Sino-Burmese families send their children to the city's English language schools for primary and secondary education and Chinese and Singaporean Universities for education. Presently, many wealthy Burmese Chinese send their children overseas—in particular to Thailand, Malaysia and Singapore, for advanced studies. Taiwan is also a major destination, as the Taiwanese government offers aid and scholarship incentives to 'returning' overseas Chinese to study and settle there.

Until vast nationalisation by the Ne Win's government happened in 1963, most Burmese Chinese were enrolled in schools where Mandarin Chinese was the medium of instruction with Burmese as a second language. Notable Chinese schools at that time include:

- Burma-Chinese High School (緬甸華僑中學)
- Nanyang High School (緬甸南洋中學)- now Basic Education High School No. 2 Bahan
- Rangoon Chinese Elementary School (仰光華僑小學)
- Kee Mei Elementary School (仰光集美小學)

=== Historical employment ===
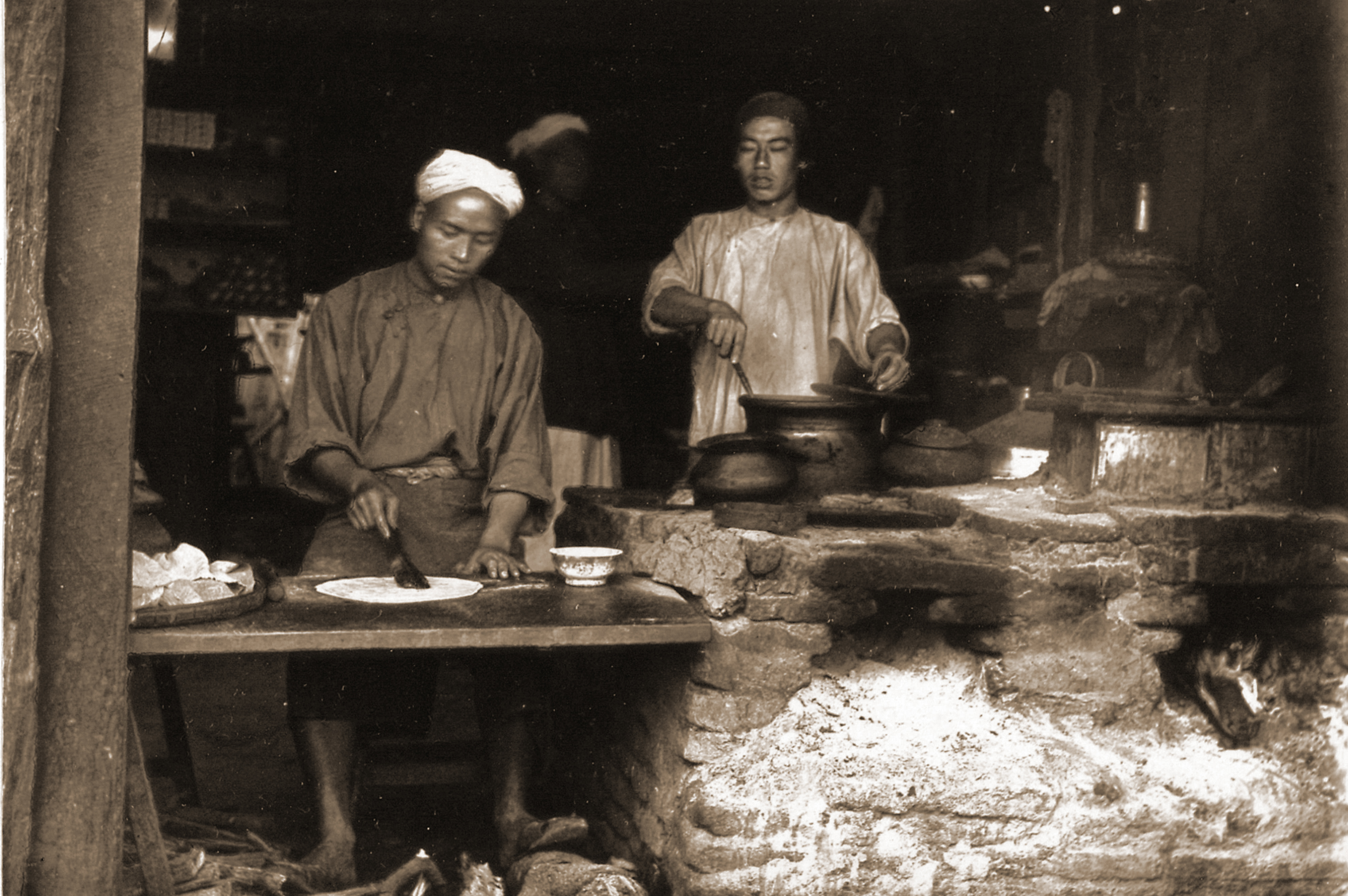
A baker's shop in Downtown Mandalay's Chinatown in 1886.

Historically, Burmese Chinese have made their livelihoods as merchants, traders, and shopkeepers as well as manual labourers such as indentured labourers (pejoratively called "coolies"); dockers, municipal workers, rickshaw men, and pony cart drivers. They were also heavily represented in certain professions such as civil servants, university lecturers, pharmacists, opticians, lawyers, engineers, and doctors. In Yangon, the Hokkien community was the dominant business force amongst the Chinese with the Cantonese occupying a smaller niche of artisan and cottage industries.

Between 1895 and 1930, Chinese-owned Burmese businesses were initially concentrated within the brokerage, manufacturing, and contracting sectors. Under British colonial rule, the Chinese share of the businesses was reduced in all sectors, but most significantly from 28.5 to 10 percent in manufacturing, 26.6 to 1.8 percent in brokerage, and 31 to 4.3 percent in contracting while Burmese Indians improved their economic positions and controlled a larger proportion of these businesses. The Chinese share of banking, previously at 33.3 percent, was eliminated. However, their share increased in industries like milling, agents, merchanting and most substantially in shop-keeping- which went from 6.7 to 18.3 percent. Of the 47 rice mills in Burma, 13 percent of them were Chinese controlled and were utilized for rice exportation and processing by Chinese rice merchants. During the last few decades of the 19th century, the Chinese diversified into rural money-lending and agenting for petroleum and natural gas. Some businessmen also ran illicit opium and gambling dens, teahouses and liquor stores.

=== Commerce and industry ===
Like much of Southeast Asia, ethnic Chinese form a dominant minority in Burmese commerce at every level of society. According to Amy Chua's 2003 book World on Fire, entrepreneurial savvy Chinese have "literally taken over the country's entire economy." According to a 2015 presentation by Professor Choi Ho Rim, the contemporary Burmese Chinese are estimated to effectively control approximately 76 percent of the nation's entire economy. Chinese enclaves have sprung up across major cities throughout the country.

After the State Law and Order Restoration Council (SLORC) came to power in 1988 and liberalised the economy, Chinese-owned Burmese businesses gain a slight but significant leeway to expand and ultimately assert their economic clout. For example, Sein Gay Har, a major Burmese retailer that began in Yangon's Chinatown in 1985, is owned by a Burmese family of Hakka ancestry. Moreover, Burmese businessmen of Chinese ancestry control the nations four of the five largest commercial banks, Myanmar Universal Bank, Yoma Bank, Myanmar Mayflower Bank, and the Asia Wealth Bank. As the indigenous Bamars were known for their graceful hospitality towards non-Burmese ethnics, newly settled Han Chinese immigrants began to capitalize on business opportunities and carving out niches that the Chinese community were well known for specializing in following Burma's acceptance of free-market capitalism in 1988.

Many artisan products historically produced by the indigenous Burmans have been entirely displaced by cheaper and higher-quality Chinese consumer imports. Chinese equipment imported, however, tend to be low-quality with such exports being produced in exchange for high-quality exports to China. Burmese entrepreneurs of Chinese ancestry have become dominant figures in key industries following the economic liberalisation of the State Peace and Development Council rule in 1989. These include the timber industry- primarily teak- and gemstones- primarily rubies.

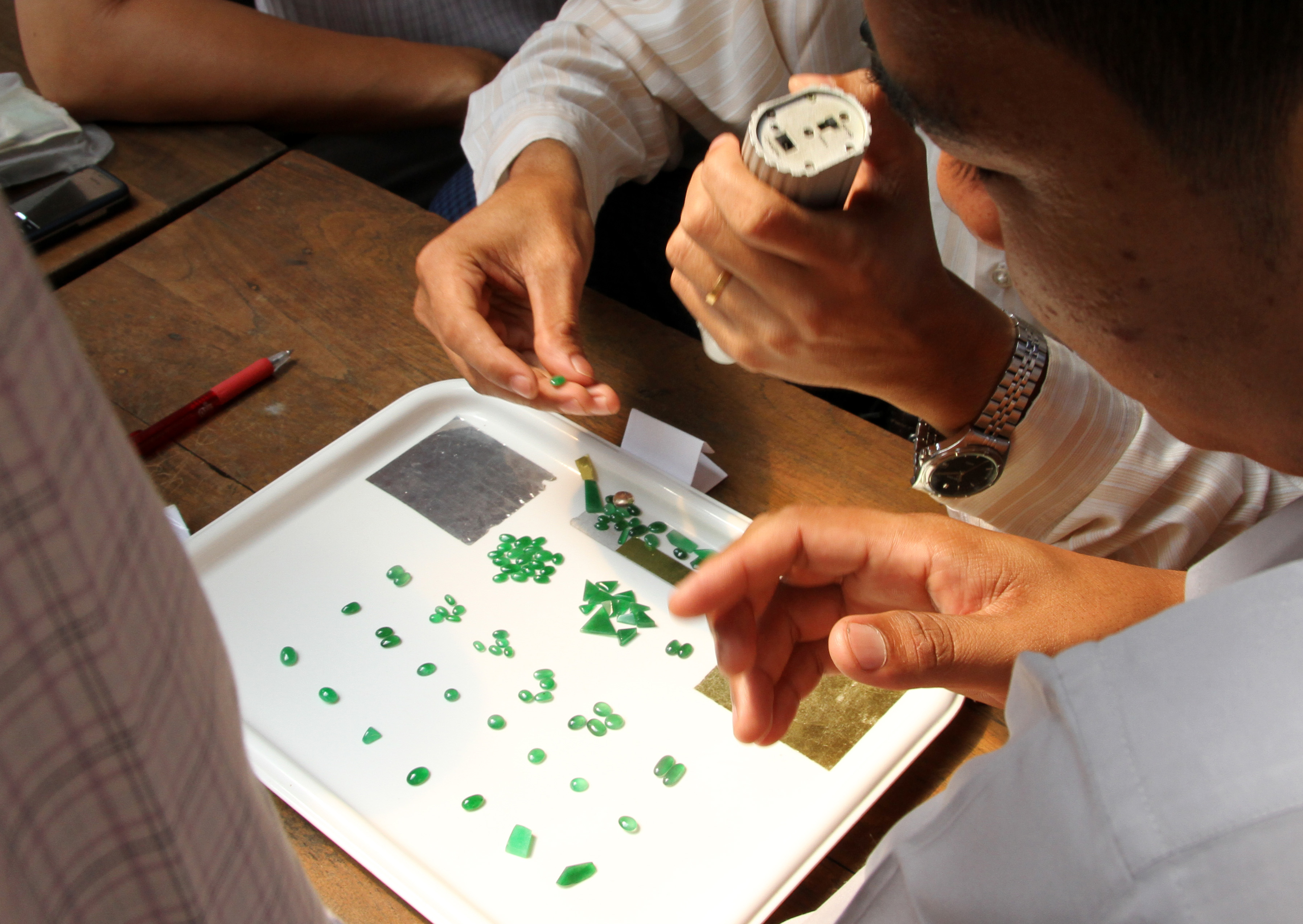
A Chinese-owned Burmese Jade Market in Mandalay

The Chinese have been the chief driving force behind Burma's gem mining industry and jade exports. Burma's booming gem industry is operated by Chinese hands at every level, from the financiers and concession operators to retail merchants of newly opened gem markets. One Chinese-owned jewelry company reportedly controls 100 gem mines and produces over 2,000 kilograms of raw rubies annually.

The autarky of Ne Win's rule gave Chinese-owned small businesses like restaurants, karoake bars and hotels an advantage in the late 1980s onwards as all businesses had to be built up from nothing. Burmese-Chinese also have small businesses like hawkers who sell bicycle tires or new Chinese immigrant farmers growing rice in northern Burma.

Businessman Lo Hsing Han and industrialist Kyaw Win, are prominent examples of Burma's native-born tycoons of Chinese ancestry. Working with and bribing the SLORC government, these men have come to manage major banks, airlines such as Yangon Airways, teak logging companies, gemstone mining concessions. Lo was also an opium warlord, gaining economic clout by cutting deals with the government to resolve conflict in his native Kokang. Like him, many Chinese Burmese dominate the black market of Myanmar like any other economic industry. Lo's son, Steven Law is also a prominent businessman well known for being at the helm of Burma's largest conglomerate company Asia World, whose investments include a container shipping line, port buildings, and toll road authorities.

While Chinese Burmese communities are often portrayed as dominating Myanmar's economy, this narrative oversimplifies the situation. Chinese companies’ economic involvement has been deeply tied to Myanmar's political economy, particularly through dealings with the military government. Such actions have increasingly been viewed by locals as complicity with the regime. However, it is crucial to distinguish between the activities of Chinese-backed corporations and the experiences of the broader Chinese Burmese community, who face complex socioeconomic realities that cannot be reduced to economic dominance.

=== Migrants to Mandalay ===
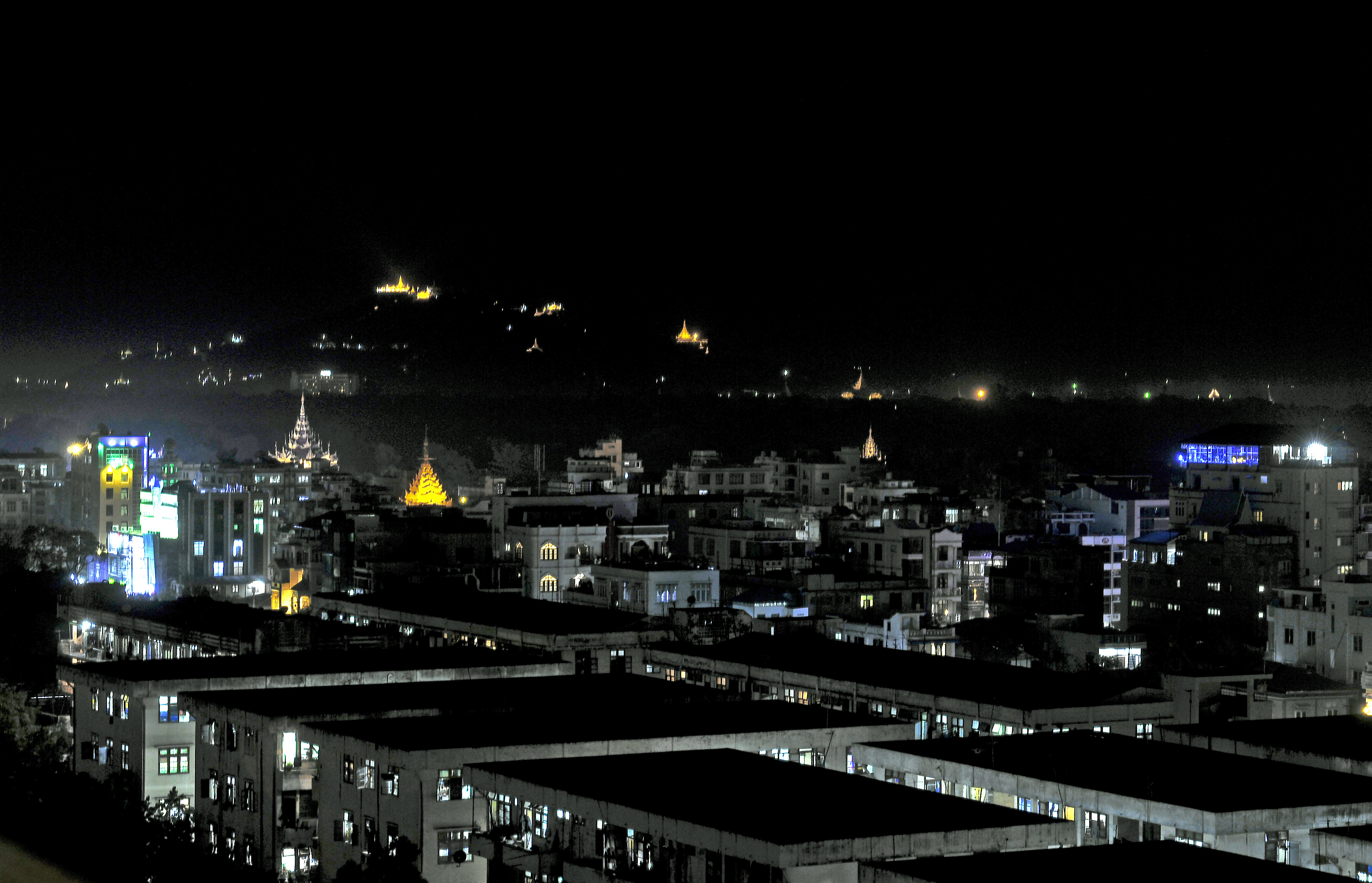
Mandalay at night

Mandalay remains Burma's major financial and networking hub for Burmese businessmen and investors of Chinese ancestry with thousands of prospering Chinese businesses in the city. Chinese-owned shops make up 50% of downtown economic activity, with 70% of restaurants and almost all Chinese-made commodity sale centres in the whole city being Chinese-owned.

Over the last 30 years, the entrepreneurial Chinese minority transformed Mandalay into a booming modern metropolis filled with foreign businesses and gem trading centers. The country's post-1988 economic liberalization and Burma's open-door immigration policy attracted many poor Chinese migrants from Yunnan in search of economic opportunity who brought talent, skills, goods and services, and capital, reshaping Mandalay's economic landscape. Arriving impoverished, Burmese businessmen of Chinese ancestry now sit at the helm of the Burmese economy as a prosperous business community. Following Burma's new market transformation, Chinese immigrants from Yunnan were able to illegally obtain identity cards on the black market to become naturalized Burmese citizens overnight. A substantial increase in foreign direct investment has poured in from mainland China, mostly ending up in Mandalay's real estate sector, through Burmese citizen intermediaries of Chinese ancestry. As Mandalay became more economically prosperous, existing Burmese Chinese have facilitated continued immigration from China.

Prime real estate in central Mandalay has been bought by wealthy Chinese businessmen and investors. Large commercial real estate projects, such as hotels or shopping centres, are typically developed by Chinese businessmen and real estate investors. The Burmese Chinese business community's impact on the city's development has also been amplified by additional investment from mainland and overseas Chinese investment through bamboo networks. The influence of mainland China is felt throughout the city, leading locals to call Mandalay a "Chinese city".

Recent immigrants from China move to Mandalay for business, without the intent to settle there. These "new Chinese" move into new Chinese neighbourhoods outside Mandalay, as the central city's Burmese Chinese areas are too expensive for them. Tensions have grown between local Burmese and new Chinese businesspeople due to cultural differences.

=== Bamboo network ===
Much of the influx of foreign investment capital into the Burmese economy from mainland and overseas Chinese investors have been channelled through the bamboo network to help launch new companies and executing potential business acquisitions. Burmese Chinese network not just with each other, but also with senior Burmese government officials through activities like golf. Moreover, Chinese-owned Burmese businesses form a part of the larger business network of overseas Chinese firms operating in the markets of Greater China and Southeast Asia that also share common ties.

Local Chinese-owned businesses, like noodle stalls and bakeries, that emerged after World War II became focal points of economic life in small towns throughout Burma. Today, Burma's Chinese community is at the forefront of opening up the country's economy to conduct foreign business and direct investment, especially catering it towards foreign ethnic Chinese investors, serving as an international overseas Chinese economic outpost. Despite their status as alien minorities, the close relationship between Myanmar's military rulers and the People's Republic of China helped push reform for the Chinese disapora in the 1980s. In addition, Chinese companies tended to hire ethnic Chinese. The rise of China in the 2010s and the influx of "new Chinese" have created unease among the Burmese Chinese who both welcome increased cultural understanding and fear animosity to China's policies being directed at all people of Chinese descent.

Beyond sharing a common ethnic ancestry, cultural, linguistic, and familial ties, many Burmese entrepreneurs and investors of Chinese ancestry are strong adherents of the Confucian paradigm of interpersonal relationships when doing business with each other. They believed that the underlying source for entrepreneurial and investment success relied on the cultivation of personal relationships.

In the early 2000s, the Burmese Chinese Chamber of Commerce was founded. It acts as a guild, business networking centre and commercial lookout helping local Business businessmen and ethnic Chinese investors to secure and protect shared economic interests.

=== Burmese attitudes and responses ===
The 8888 Uprising saw Burmese political literature that expressed anti-Chinese sentiment, with many reflecting on "public outrage" at the takeover of Mandalay by Chinese migrants who care not for cultural preservation or local morality. Underlying resentment and bitterness from the impoverished Burmese majority has been accumulating as indigenous Burmese lack substantial business equity in Burma and have not profited from economic liberalisation like the Burmese Chinese.

Chinese economic clout in cities like Mandalay grew at the same time that State Law and Order Restoration Council (SLORC) junta forcibly relocated Burmese as a means of social control. During the Burmese property boom in the 1990s, Chinese real estate investors began building and speculating as property values doubled and tripled, which resulted indigenous Burmese being pushed further away from the city center of Mandalay. The increased economic clout held in the hands of the Chinese in Burma has triggered distrust, envy, resentment and anti-Chinese hostility among the indigenous Burmese majority. According to Amy Chua, the free market liberalization under SLORC rule brought virtually no economic benefit to the Bamar majority but rather the domination and looting of their country by a small handful of outsiders. Many Bamar are additionally unhappy from the dominance of Chinese language, food and a perceived lack of adherence to traditional tenets of Burmese Buddhism by the Chinese community in Mandalay.

== Culture ==
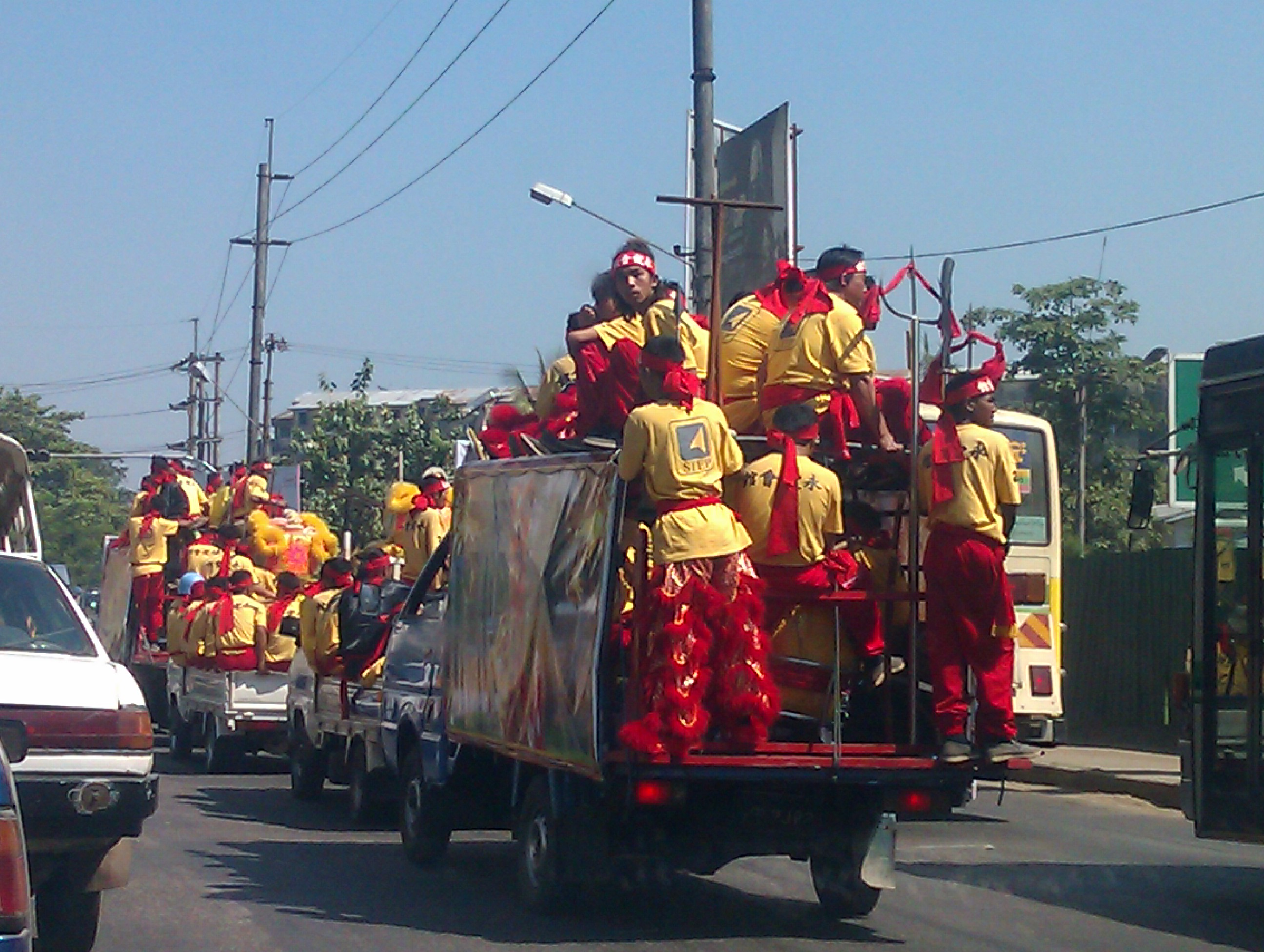
Celebrating tour in the Chinese New Year; mainly from tan (colour) Chinese teenagers, Yangon

=== Language ===
Most Burmese Chinese speak Burmese in their daily life. Those with higher education also speak Standard Chinese and/or English. The use of Chinese dialects still prevails. Hokkien (a dialect of Min Nan from Quanzhou, Zhangzhou and Jinjiang) and Taishanese (a Yue dialect akin to Cantonese) from Taishan and Xinhui are mostly used in Yangon as well as in Lower Myanmar, while Yunnanese Mandarin is well preserved in Upper Myanmar.

Although General Ne Win's rule (1962–1988) enacted the ban on Chinese-language schools that caused a decline of Mandarin speakers, the number of Chinese schools is growing again. (Note: Standard Chinese refers to the national language of the PRC and Taiwan, distinct from the Southwestern Mandarin dialect of the Upper Myanmar, Kokang and Panthay). At the end of 2012, Mizzima News reported that an increasing number of young Burmese Chinese are expressing interest in Chinese language, taking language courses even when their parents don't understand Chinese. However, this trend is not necessarily indicative of an interest in joining Chinese community or cultural organisations, as many of their parents did. Groups like the Myanmar Overseas Young Chinese League report a lack of interest from Burmese Chinese youth.

=== Religion ===
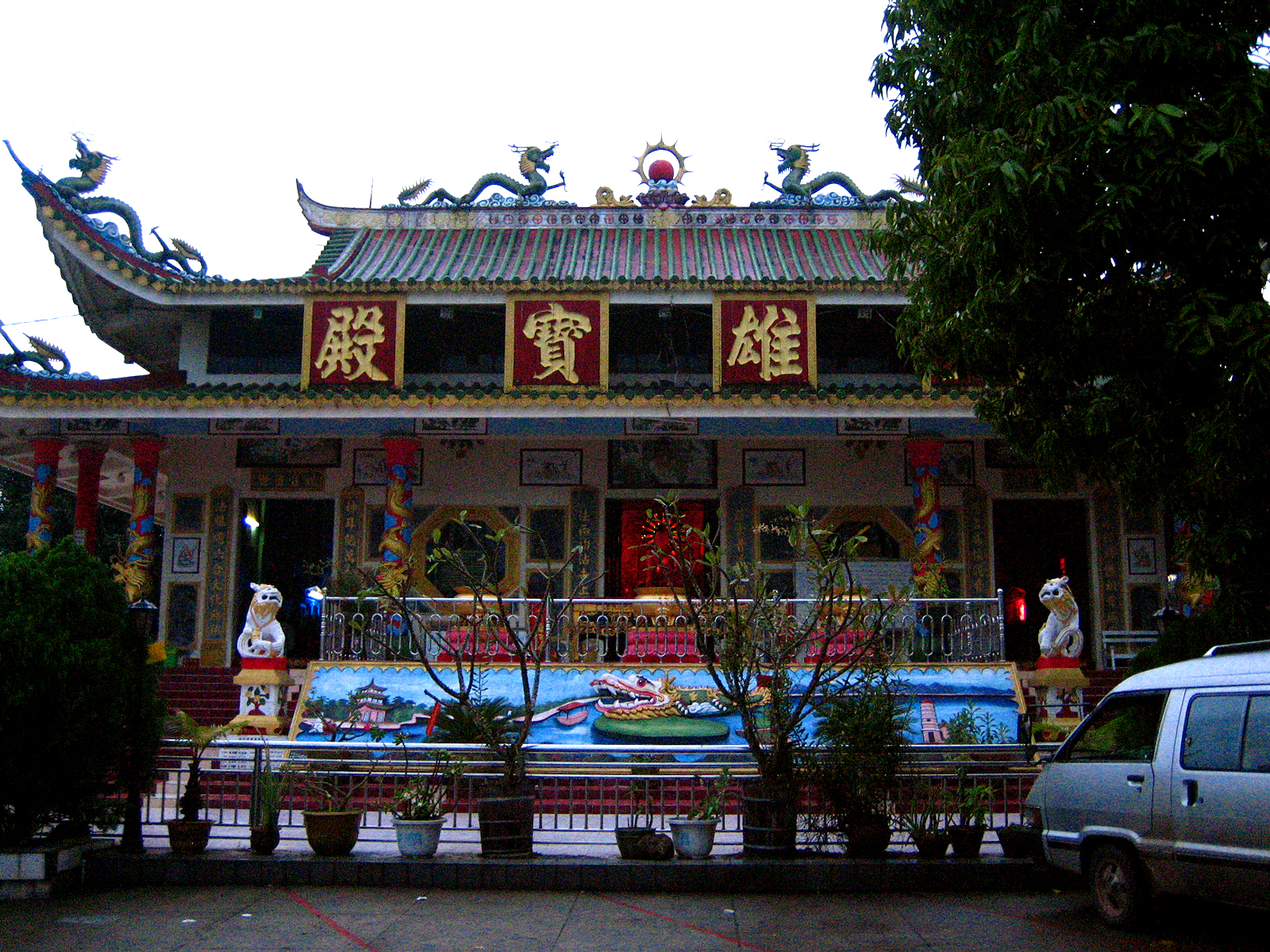
The Kuan Yin Temple (Kwan Yin Si) is a local place of worship for Burmese Chinese in Bago and serves as a Mandarin school for the local community.

Most Burmese Chinese practice Theravada Buddhism, while incorporating some Mahayana Buddhist and Taoist beliefs including ancestral worship. There are also some prominent Theravadin Buddhist meditation teacher of Chinese descent like Sayadaw U Tejaniya. There are several notable Chinese temples situated in Yangon, including Fushan Temple (dedicated to Qingshui Zhushi), Kheng Hock Keong Temple (dedicated to Mazu) and Guanyin Gumiao Temple (dedicated to Guanyin).

The minority Panthay or Chinese Muslims (回教華人; ပန်းသေးလူမျိုး, lit. "little flowers") originated from Yunnan are mainly Muslim.

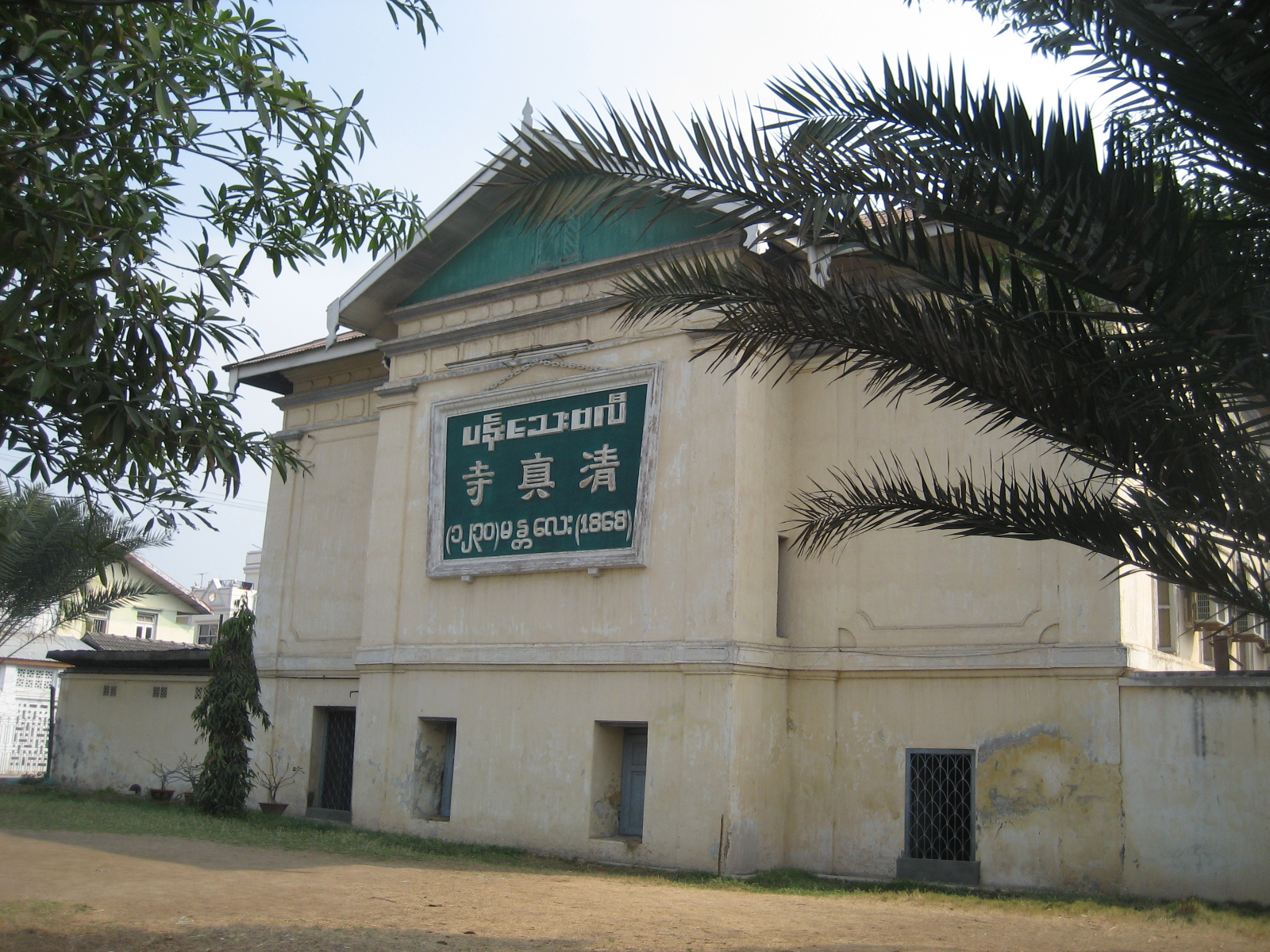
The Panthay Mosque (清真寺) in Mandalay serves the local Panthay community.

=== Names ===
The Burmese Chinese have Burmese names and many also have Chinese names. Given names in various Chinese dialects are often transliterated into the Burmese language, using phonetic transcriptions or translated. For example, a Burmese Chinese person named 'Khin Aung' may have the Chinese name of 慶豐 (Hokkien POJ: Khèng-hong), with '慶' (Hokkien POJ: khèng) corresponding to 'Khin', and '豐' (Hokkien POJ: hong) corresponding to 'Aung'. However, variations of transcription do exist (between dialects), and some Burmese Chinese do not choose to adopt similar-sounding Burmese and Chinese names. Because the Burmese lack surnames, many Burmese Chinese tend to pass on portions of their given names to future generations, for the purpose of denoting lineage.

According to publications of Long Shan Tang, a clan association based in Yangon, the ten most common Chinese surnames in Yangon are:

1. Lee/Li (李)
2. Peng/Pang (彭)
3. Shi/See/Si (時)
4. Dong/Tung (董)
5. Min/Man (閔)
6. Niu/Ngau (牛)
7. Pian/Pin (邊)
8. Hsin (辛)
9. Kwan (關)
10. Khaw (許)

In Myanmar, the majority of Chinese surnames are Lim 林, Tan 陈, Yang 杨, Lee 李, Chou 周, Wang 王, Chang 张, Su 苏, Huang 黄, Yeh 叶, Hsu 许, Fang 方 and Wu 吴

=== Cuisine ===
Burmese Chinese cuisine is based on Chinese cuisine, particularly from Fujian, Guangdong and Yunnan provinces, with local influences. Spices such as turmeric and chili are commonly used. Also, the use of soy sauce, bean curd, bean sprouts, Chinese pickled mustards, and dried mushrooms can be attributed to Chinese influence. The following is a partial list of Chinese contributions to Burmese cuisine. These are an established part of today's Burmese cuisine, and are hardly differentiated as a foreign cuisine.

- Pauksi: steamed buns
- Bèkin: roasted duck
- Igyakway: fried Chinese doughnut
- Htamin kyaw: fried rice
- La mont: mooncake
- Mi shay: thin rice noodle soup
- Mi swan: thin wheat noodles
- San byoke: rice porridge
- Panthay khauk swè: Panthay-style fried noodles
- Sigyet khaukswè: literally "noodles laced in cooked oil," usually with chicken
- Kyay oh: literally "beehoon soup with chicken or pork,"
- Kor yay khautswe: noodle with thick starchy gravy
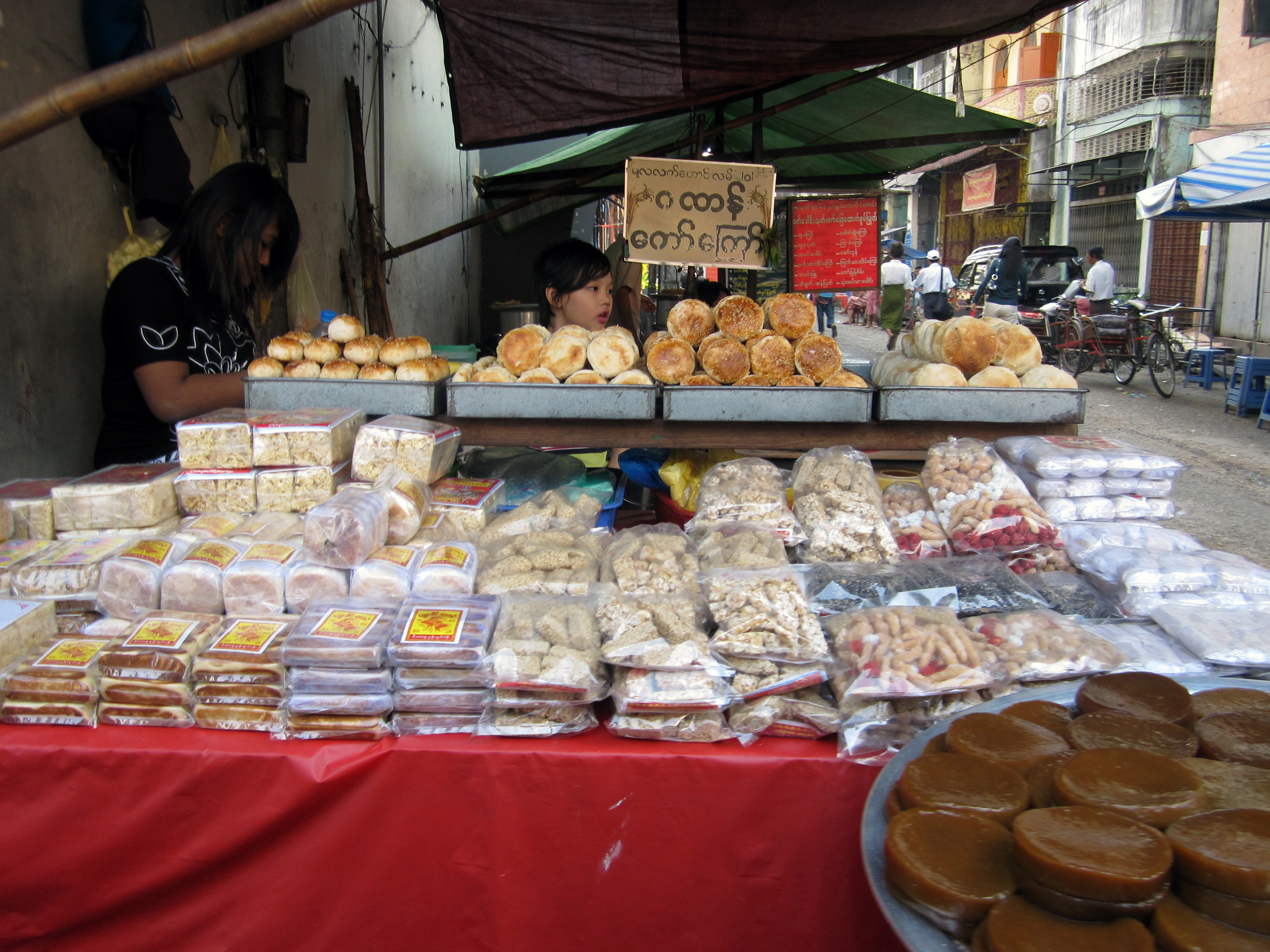
A streetside vendor in Latha Township (also known as "China Town") selling Chinese baked goods, including tikay and paste-filled buns.

== Burmese Chinese outside Myanmar ==
There are substantial Burmese Chinese communities outside of Myanmar, particularly in Taiwan, Macau, Hong Kong, Singapore, the United States (such as New York City's Henry Street) and Australia. Zhonghe District, near Taipei, Taiwan is home to 40,000 Burmese Chinese (2008), one of the largest communities outside of Myanmar. Huaxin Street is known as Little Burma.

Like other Southeast Asian businesses owned by those of Chinese ancestry, Chinese-owned businesses in Burma often forge corporate partnerships with Greater Chinese and other overseas Chinese businesses across the globe through bamboo networks in search of new opportunities. However, most wealthy Chinese Burmese businessmen have chosen to stay in Burma or have concentrated their efforts on surrounding Southeast Asian markets such as Malaysia, Singapore, and Thailand as well as the Greater Chinese market. These people also typically have friends and extended family members in mainland China. These connections, alongside the economic conditions brought about by China's economic reform since the late 1970s, have allowed them to support their corporate objectives on and private wealth accumulation by introducing the wholesale market of mainland Chinese products into Burma and other Southeast Asian markets.

== See also ==
- China–Burma relations
- Kokang people
- Thai Chinese
- Rangoon
