= Sigyet khauk swè =

Burmese garlic noodle dish

Sigyet khauk swe
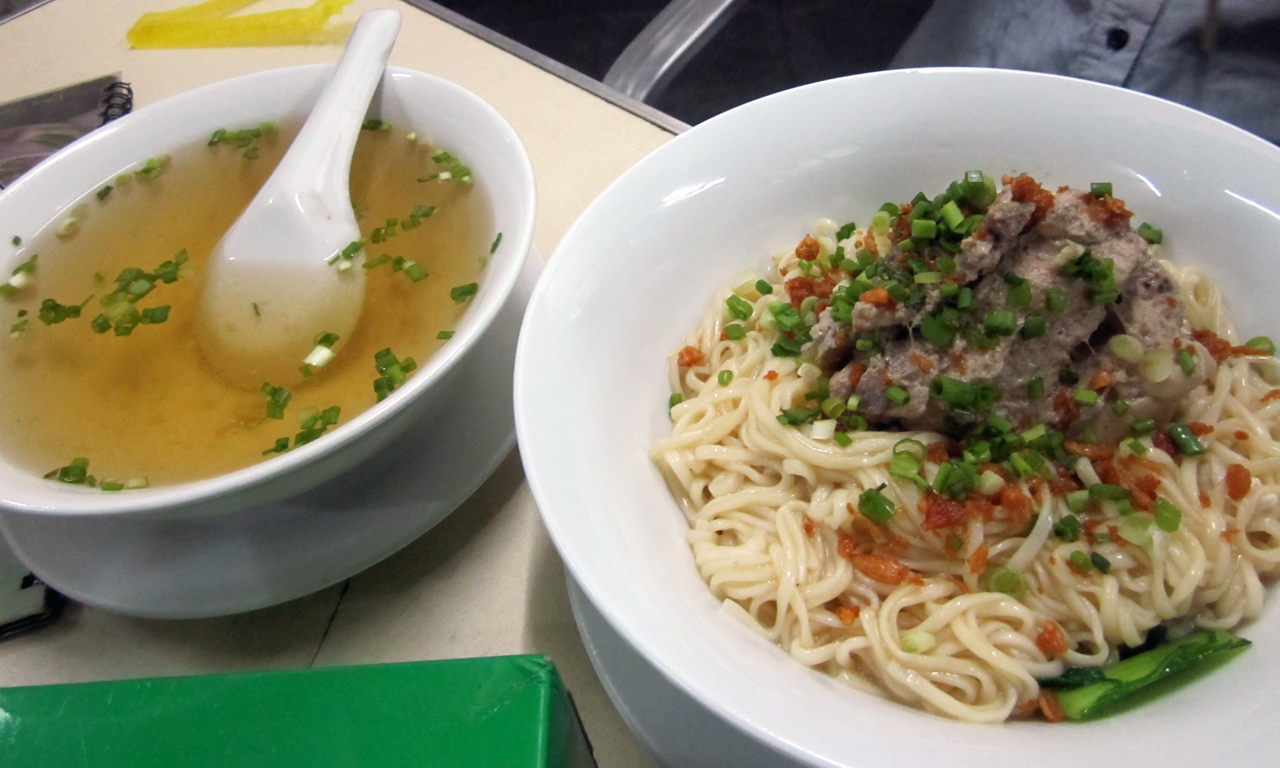
- Alternative names: Cooked oil noodles
- Course: Main dish
- Place of origin: Myanmar (Burma)
- Associated cuisine: Burmese cuisine
- Created by: Sino-Burmese people
- Main ingredients: noodles; fried garlic; oil; chives
- Ingredients generally used: duck; cucumber; spring onions
- Similar dishes: Kolo mee, Oil noodles

Sigyet khauk swe (Burmese: ဆီချက်ခေါက်ဆွဲ; lit. 'cooked oil noodles') is a fried noodle dish in Burmese cuisine. Egg or wheat noodles are fried in sigyet (i.e., oil infused with garlic aroma), fried garlic, topped with a protein like duck or roast duck, and optionally garnished with sliced cucumbers and green onions. The dish is associated with the Sino-Burmese community.

== See also ==
- Khauk swè
