= Khauk swè =

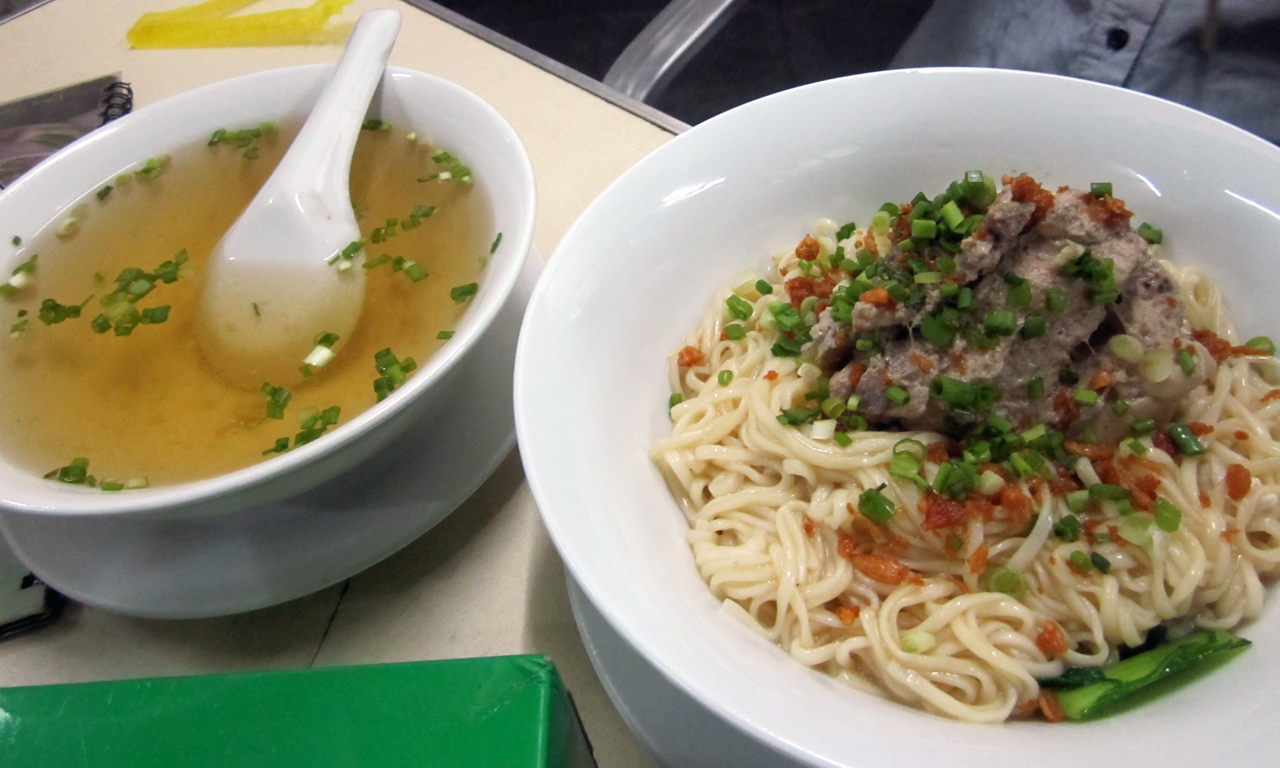
Sigyet khauk swe

Khauk swè are wheat noodles in Burmese cuisines. Dishes made with them include:

- Khauk swè thoke
- Panthay khauk swè: Panthay-style fried noodles
- Sigyet khaukswè: literally "noodles laced in cooked oil," usually with chicken
