= Fushan Temple =

Buddhist temple in Yangon, Myanmar

Fushan Temple Hok-san-sī 福山寺
- Location within Myanmar

Religion
- Affiliation: Mahayana Buddhism
- Deity: Chó·-su-kong (Qingshui)

Location
- Location: Kaba Aye Pagoda Road, Bahan Township, Yangon
- Country: Burma
- Coordinates: 16°49′30.73″N 96°9′15.64″E

Architecture
- Completed: January 1875; 151 years ago

Fushan Temple (Chinese: 福山寺; pinyin: Fúshān Sì; Pe̍h-ōe-jī: Hok-san-sī; Burmese: ကုက္ကိုင်းဘုရားကျောင်း; also called Fu Shan Si or Fu Sun Si), located on Kaba Aye Pagoda Road in Bahan Township, Yangon, is a Chinese temple founded in January 1875 by overseas Chinese descended from Hoklo people of Anxi County, Fujian. The temple is managed by Kheng Hock Keong in downtown Yangon. Fushansi is dedicated to a deified Chinese Buddhist monk known as Master Qingshui or Chó·-su-kong in Hokkien (Chinese: 祖師公, also known as Qingshui Zushi) and the temple was restored in 2008. Fu Shan Temple attracts many devotees especially during Chinese New Year and Master Qingshui's birthday.

The temple-tender, Mr. Yang, who said that he took part in its renovation in 1960, has managed the temple for many years. The temple compound includes a restaurant and a basketball court. There is also a small artificial body of water in the center of the compound, right in front of the entrance to the temple. The compound has become more of a Chinese park rather than a center of worship. The surrounding area includes traditional Chinese sculptures and architectural designs. There are also circular Chinese balconies with their stone-made tables and stools. Beside one of the balconies, there are statues from the Chinese zodiac and miniature versions of a Chinese bridge and tower.

== See also ==
- Kheng Hock Keong
- Guanyin Gumiao Temple
- Long Shan Tang Temple
