= Long Shan Tang Temple =

Coordinates: 16°46′28.14″N 96°9′2.49″E

Long Shan Tang Temple (Chinese: 龍山堂; pinyin: Lóngshān Táng; Pe̍h-ōe-jī: Liông-san-tông) is a Hokkien Chinese clan temple (also called Kongsi) located on Anawrahta Road in Latha Township, part of Yangon's Chinatown. It was founded by members of the Tseng and Khoo clans from China's Fujian province in 1877. This temple is dedicated for ancestral worship.

== See also ==
- Fushan Temple
- Guanyin Gumiao Temple
- Kheng Hock Keong Temple
- Khoo Kongsi in Penang, Malaysia
