= Kheng Hock Keong =

Largest and oldest Mazu temple in Yangon, Myanmar

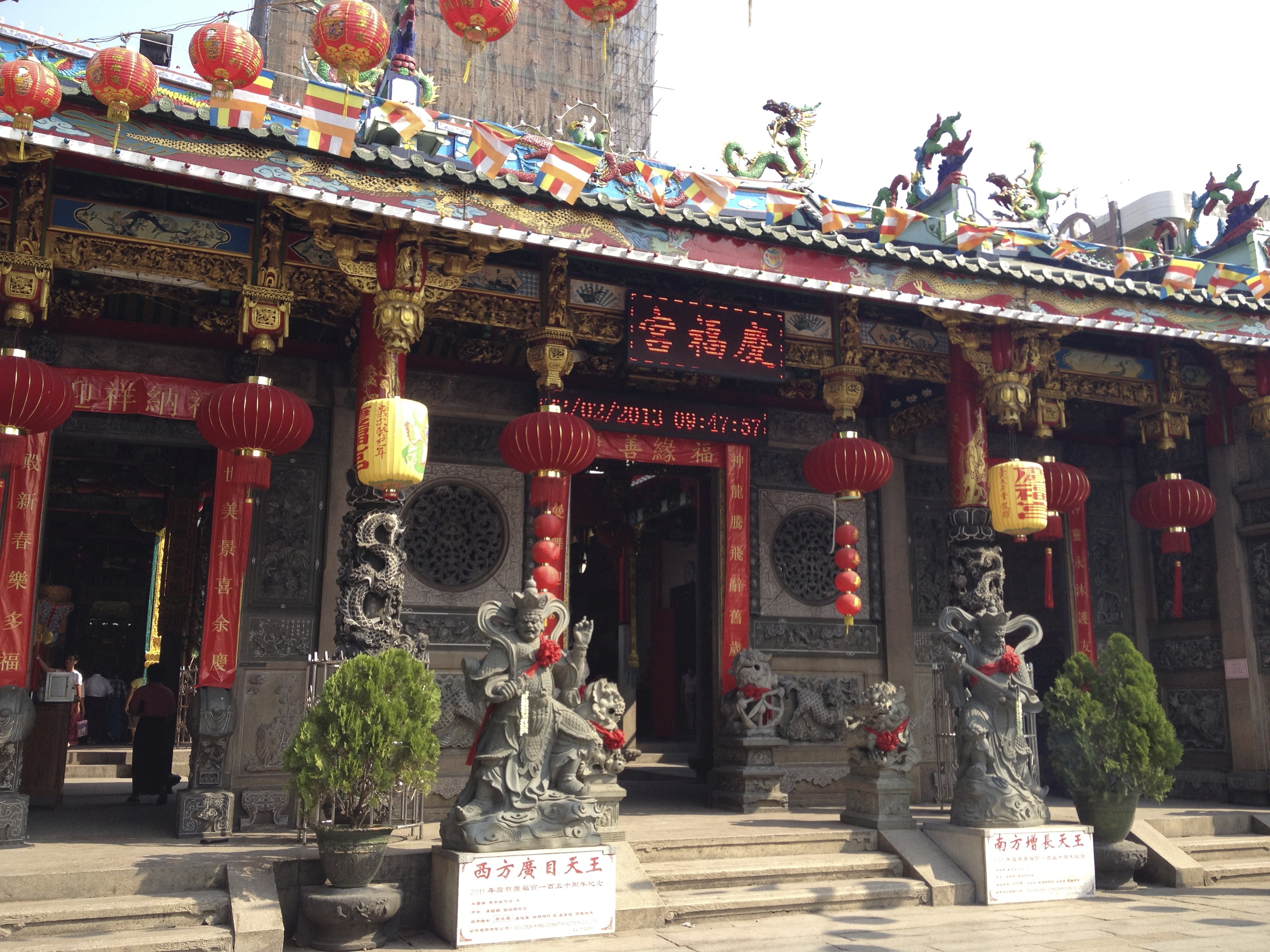
- Kheng Hock Keong in 2013

- Location within Myanmar

Religion
- Affiliation: Chinese folk religion, Mazuism

Location
- Location: 426-432 Strand Road, Yangon
- Country: Myanmar
- Coordinates: 16°46′21.32″N 96°8′55.27″E

Architecture
- Completed: 1863; 163 years ago

Kheng Hock Keong
- Traditional Chinese: 慶福宮
Transcriptions
Standard Mandarin
- Hanyu Pinyin: Qìngfú Gōng
Southern Min
- Hokkien POJ: Khèng-hok-kiong

Burmese name
- Burmese: ခိန့်ဟုတ်ဗုဒ္ဓဘာသာဘုရားကျောင်း

The Kheng Hock Temple, also known as the Kheng Hock Keong (慶福宮), is the largest and oldest temple to the Chinese sea-goddess Mazu in Yangon, Burma. It is located on the corner of Sintodan Street and Strand Road in Latha Township. Kheng Hock Keong is maintained by a Hokkien Chinese clan association. The temple attracts mostly Hokkien and Hakka worshipers, while the other temple in Latha Township, called the Guanyin Gumiao Temple, attracts Cantonese worshipers.

== Establishment ==
It was originally built as a wooden temple in 1861 and completed in 1863, built in the Fujian style, on a tax-exempt plot of land granted by the British authorities. The founding Kheng Hock Keong Trust Committee was composed of Rangoon's largest Hokkien clans, representing the Chan-Khoo, Lim, Tan, Yeo, Lee, and Su clans. At the temple's founding, the primary deity was Guanyin. A new brick building was completed in 1903, costing over 153,000 rupees.

== Gallery ==
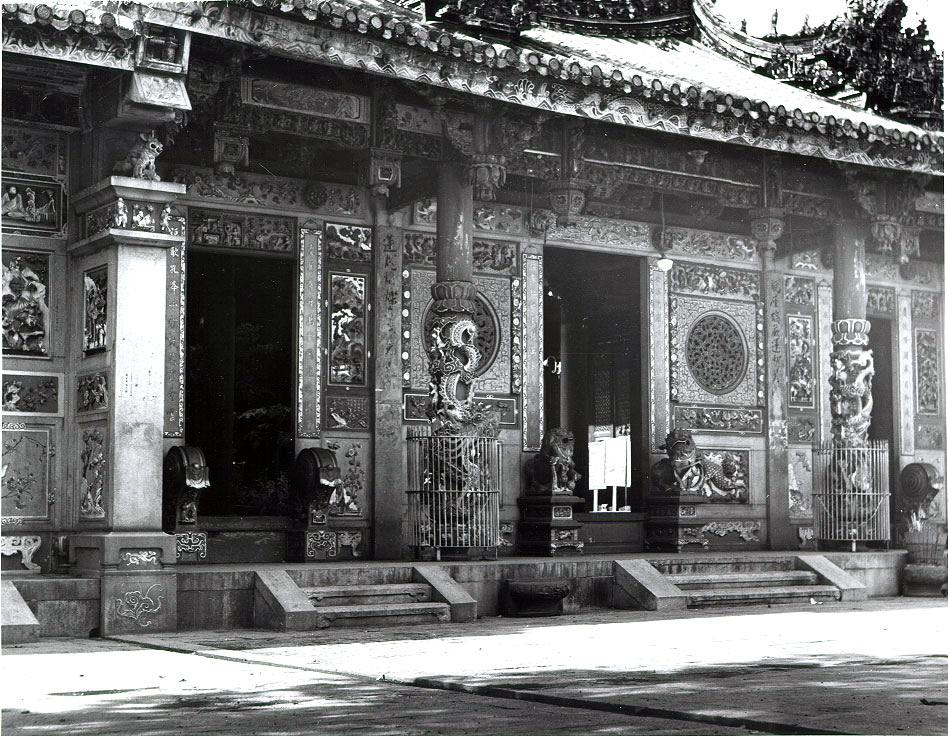
Kheng Hock Keong after World War II, in 1945.

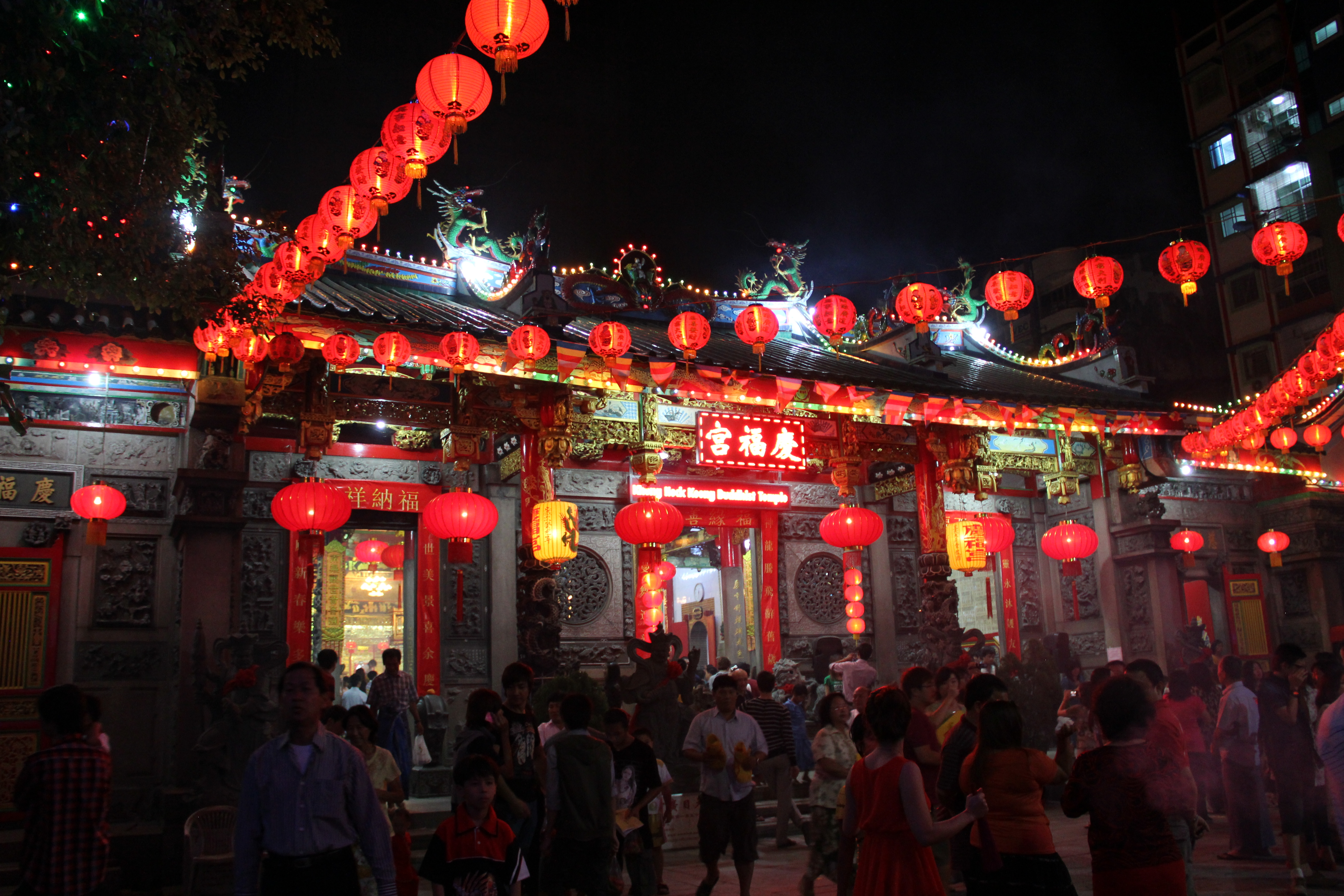
Kheng Hock Keong at 2013 Chinese New Year

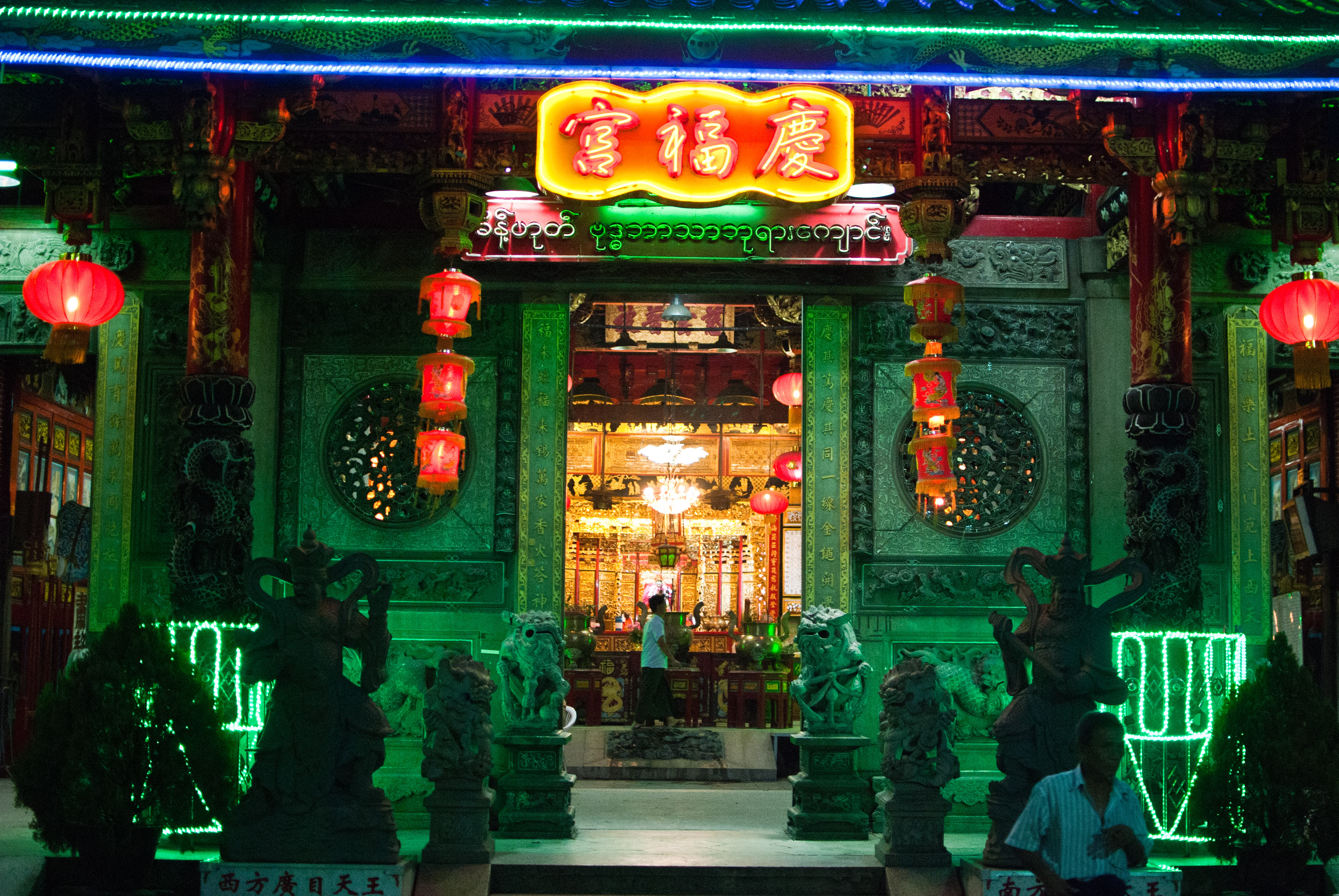
Kheng Hock Keong at night

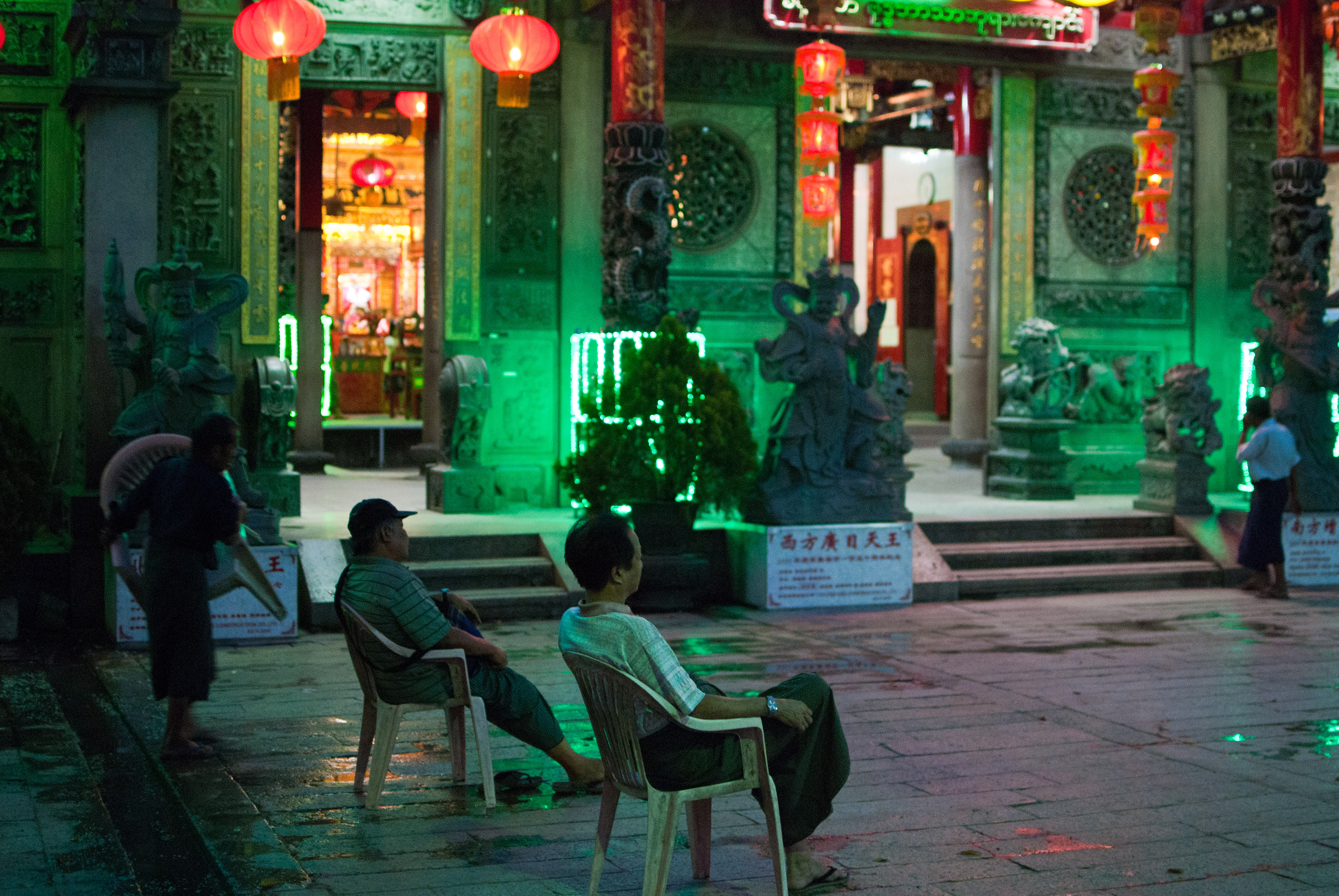
Courtyard

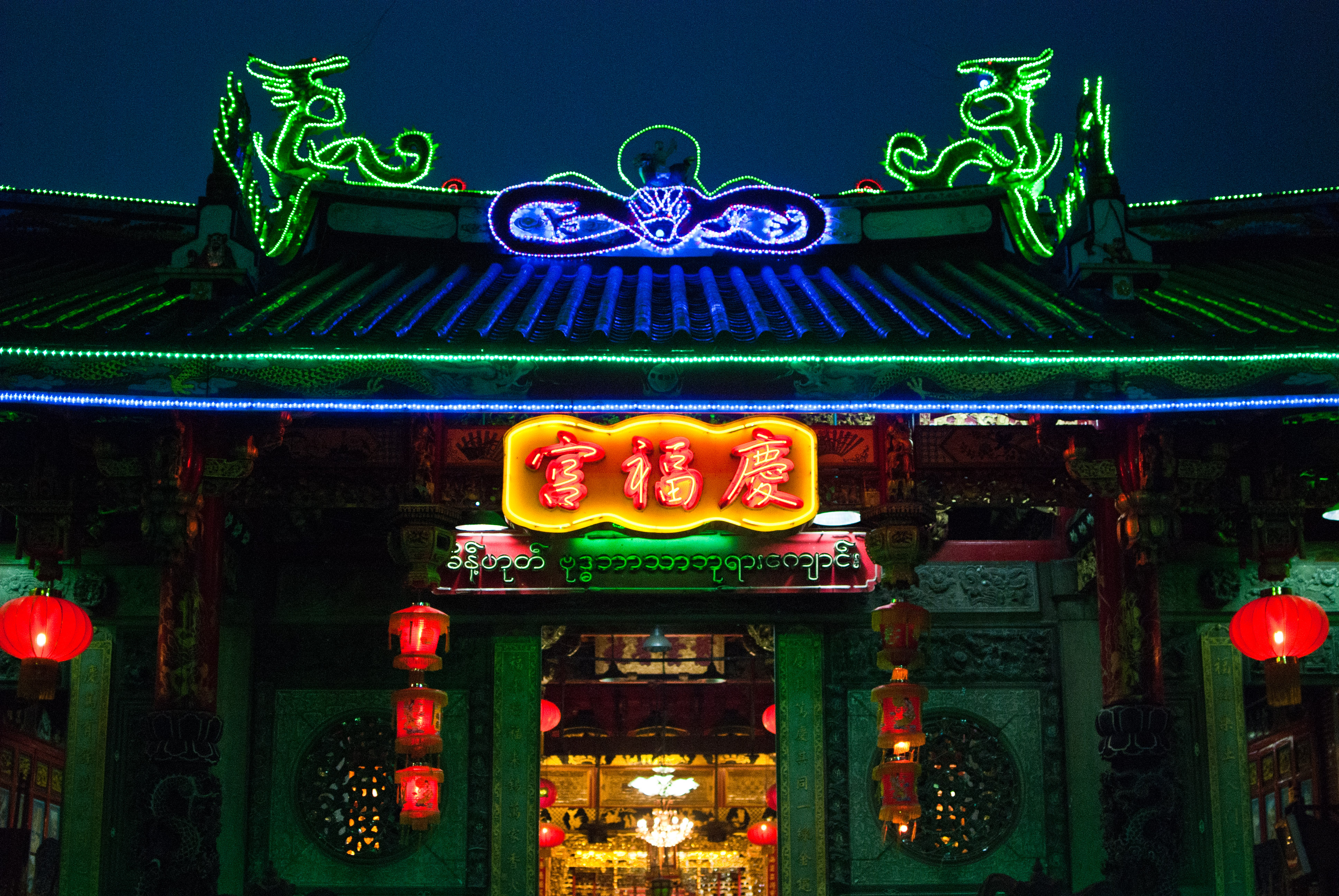
Entrance

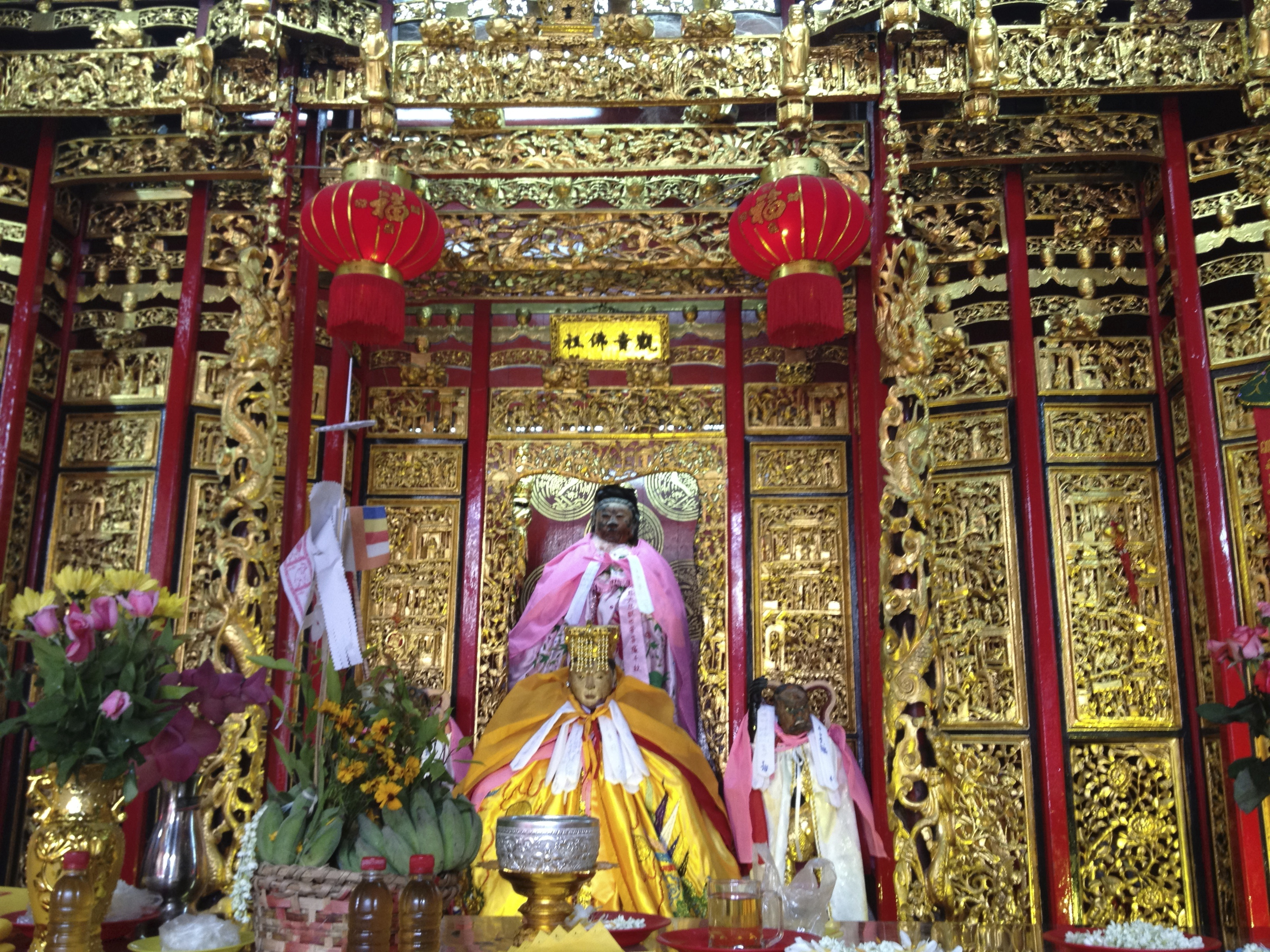
Main Shrine of Mazu

== See also ==
- Fushan Temple
- Guanyin Gumiao Temple
- Long Shan Tang Temple
- Qianliyan & Shunfeng'er
