= Guanyin Gumiao Temple =

Buddhist temple in Yangon, Myanmar

- 觀音古廟
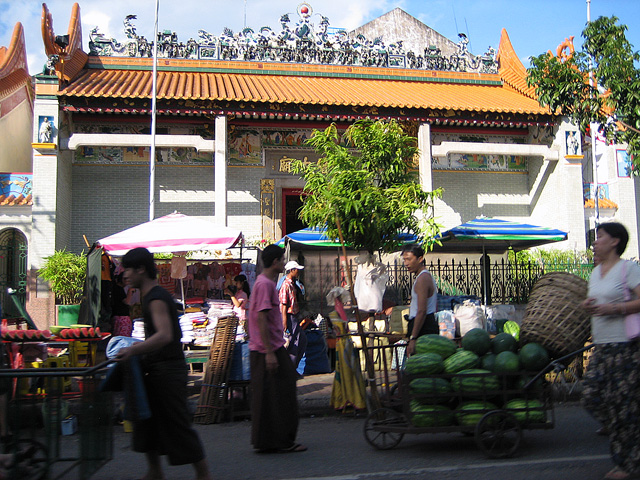
- Market stalls outside the Guanyin Gumiao Temple

- Location within Myanmar

Religion
- Affiliation: Taoist, Buddhist

Location
- Location: 668 Maha Bandula Road, Yangon
- Country: Myanmar
- Coordinates: 16°46′29.40″N 96°9′0.25″E

Architecture
- Completed: 1823; 203 years ago

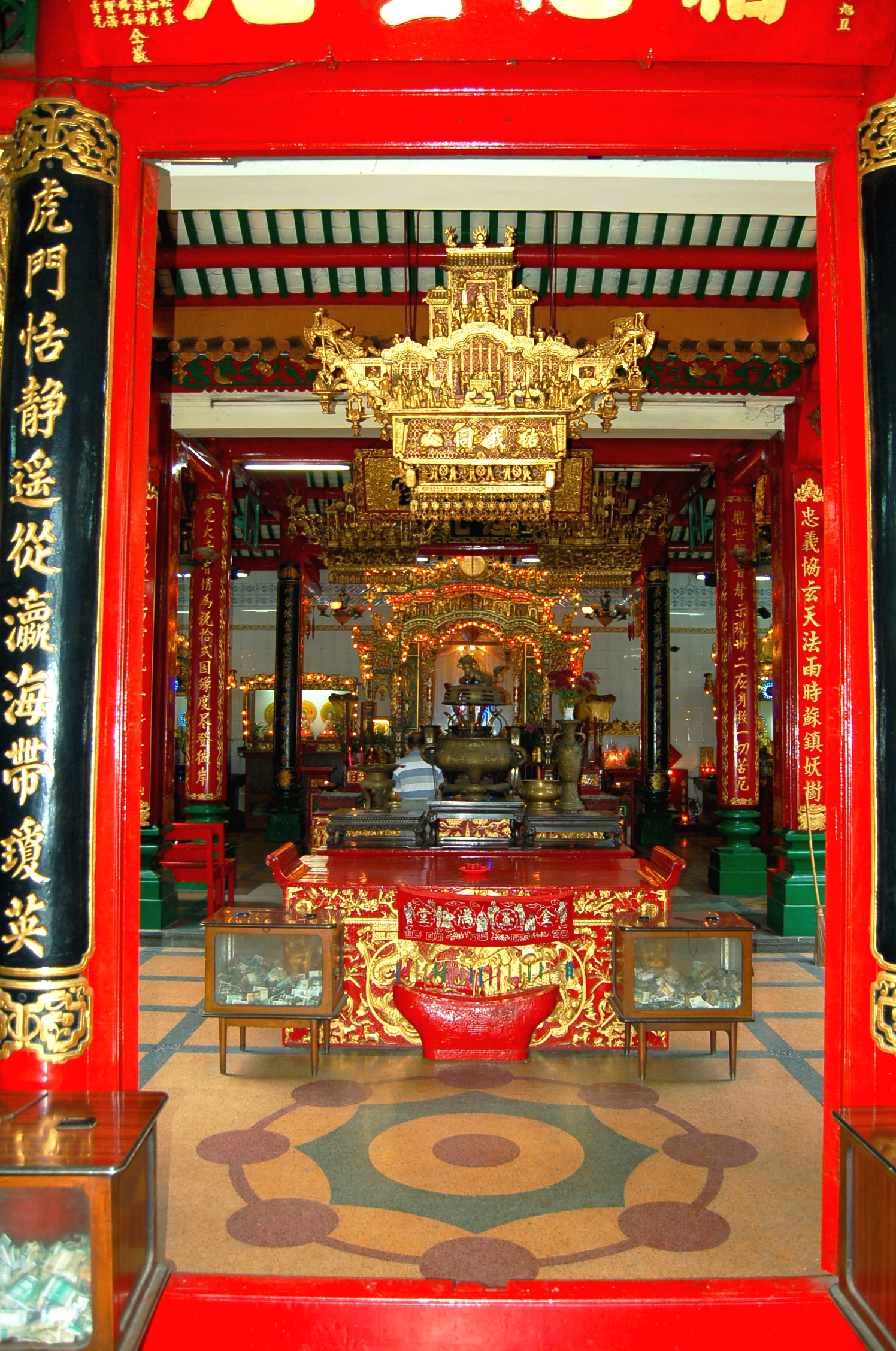
Interior of the temple

Guanyin Gumiao Temple (Chinese: 觀音古廟; pinyin: Guānyīn Gǔmiào; Jyutping: gun1 jam1 gu2 miu6*2, also known as the Guangdong Guanyin Temple) is one of two major Chinese temples located within Latha Township in Yangon's Chinatown, along with Kheng Hock Keong. Located on Maha Bandula Road, the temple is dedicated to Guanyin, a Buddhist bodhisattva who corresponds to the Burmese Buddhist bodhisattva Avalokiteśvara (လောကနတ်, Lawka Nat).

== History ==
The temple was founded by the Cantonese community of Yangon in 1823. It was destroyed by a fire in December 1855, and subsequently rebuilt between 1864 and 1868, with two additional brick buildings to the side built in 1872.

== See also ==
- Kheng Hock Keong Temple
- Fushan Temple
- Long Shan Tang Temple
