= South Okkalapa Maternal and Child Hospital =

South Okkalapa Women and Children Hospital
- Department of Medical Services (DOMS), Ministry of Health and Sports (MOHS), Myanmar

Geography
- Location: Myitta Road,Ward 10, South Okkalapa Township, Yangon, Myanmar

Organisation
- Type: Teaching
- Affiliated university: University of Medicine 2, Yangon since 1996

Services
- Emergency department: Yes
- Beds: 150
- Speciality: Obstetrics, Gynaecology and Child Health

History
- Founded: 1961

Links
- Lists: Hospitals in Myanmar

The South Okkalapa Women and Children Hospital (Burmese: တောင်ဥက္ကလာပ မိခင်နှင့်ကလေး ဆေးရုံၾကီး) is a 150-bed specialist public hospital in South Okkalapa Township of Yangon, Myanmar. Colonel Tun Sein (B.A Zeyya Kyaw Htin Thiripyin Chi Thu) laid foundation for the hospital on 18 February 1960 and U Nu, the first Prime Minister of Myanmar, officially opened it as a Catholic Missionary Hospital on 1 May 1961. It became a 100-bed specialist hospital for women and children on 12 July 1965 and then was upgraded to a 150-bed Women and Children Hospital on 19 August 1987.

It is also a teaching hospital affiliated with University of Medicine 2, Yangon.

== Services Providing Areas ==
The hospital is providing services for the following townships.

- South Okkalapa Township
- Thingangyun Township
- South Dagon Township
- North Dagon Township
- East Dagon Township
- Yankin Township

== Inpatient Wards ==
- Obstetrics Wards
- Gynaecology Wards
- Paediatric Ward
- Neonatal Unit

== Medical Superintendent ==
Dr. Win Maw Oo - M.B.,B.S, Dip.Meds.Sc (Hospital Administration)

== See also ==
- List of hospitals in Yangon
