= Burmese hip-hop =

Music genera

Burmese/Myanmar hip hop is one of the most successful music genres in Myanmar today, and perhaps the most popular form of music among the urban youth of Yangon and Mandalay.

== First generation ==
Until 2000, rock and roll was the dominant music genre in Myanmar. The Burmese hip hop scene started in the late 1980s with the rapper Myo Kyawt Myaing although songs were plain rapping music rather than typical hip hop. In late 1990s, a Yangon-based four-member crew named Acid started introducing old school hip hop in night clubs of Yangon, and became popular among Yangon's youth. Acid, widely considered to be the pioneers of Burmese hip-hop, made their debut in 2000 with Sa-Tin-Gyin (Beginning).

Their success attracted other hip-hop artists and groups, now known as the "first generation" of Burmese hip-hop, like Theory (Barbu and Thxa Soe), NS (Kyaw Thu Soe and Lin Lin) and Too Big. Most of the first generation artists used old school hip-hop. Still, hip hop was new to the Burmese and apart from Acid and Theory, not widely accepted yet by the public at large (or censors).

== Second generation ==
After Acid's breakthrough, a group named "9mm" moved the style of Burmese hip hop to a new level. Although the group's underground music was well known to the youth, most of their songs did not pass the Burmese censor board, and the group never released an own album under 9mm. Later, because of the group's alleged political activism, even the name 9mm was banned by the censor board.

Other notable groups were Project-1,Byauk-Oh (Firecracker), Examplz,G -Family, On-track,L.E.E, and Cyclone. M.H.A. (Myanmar HipHop Association) was formed unofficially. Many youths joined M.H.A. and inspired to becoming hip hop artists someday. J-Me, Bigg-Y, G-Tone, Kyak Pha, YaTha, Thuta aye and others Rappers In Myanmar.

== Third generation ==
Since late 2006, new artists like Jouk Jack, Kyaw Htut Swe claimed themselves as "Third generation". They formed a group called VIP (Rock$tar) with Ah Boy, Htein Win P Crew and Hlwan Paing.In late 2008 and early 2009, many other third generation groups released their sample albums.

== Politics ==
Some rappers have been detained or called for question by the government, especially by the military regime. Zayar Thaw served 6 years prison term until 17 May 2011 because he is the member of Generation Wave (youth anti-gov group). His group-mate (not a member of GW, though many thought he was) Yan Yan Chan was arrested and released from a temporary detained. The name 9mm is banned from use in public because they distributed sample CDs of underground group MFG in one of their performance. G-Tone from Cyclone called to question during performing in concert.
