= Myo Kyawt Myaing =

- မျိုးကျော့မြိုင်
- Born: 29 April 1971 (age 55); Thursday, 5th waxing of Kason 1333 ME; Yangon, Myanmar
- Education: SAE Institute, Singapore; University of Yangon
- Occupations: Singer; songwriter; audio engineer; educator
- Years active: 1989–present
- Spouses: Thwin Pa-Pa Aung (m. 2010; div. 2010) Jan Jann (m. 2013; div. 2016)
- Musical career
- Genres: Burmese dance-pop; Burmese synthpop; Burmese rap
- Instruments: Vocals; keyboards
- Labels

Myo Kyawt Myaing (Burmese: မျိုးကျော့မြိုင်; pronounced [mjó tɕɔ̰ mjàiɴ]; born 29 April 1971) is a Burmese singer, record producer and audio engineer. He was one of the most successful Burmese singers in the 1990s and 2000s, and is considered one of the most influential recording artists for having introduced rap music to Myanmar. He has released 11 albums and at least 34 compilation albums. Despite his "godfather of Burmese rap" moniker, his songs mainly consist of dance, synthpop and remixed music. Myo Kyawt Myaing is Governor Sitke Maung Htaw Lay's four times great-grandnephew.

== Early life ==
Myo Kyawt Myaing was born on 29 April 1971 in Yangon to May May Tin, a teacher, and Kyawt Myaing, a pilot with the Union of Burma Airways. The youngest of four siblings, he has two elder sisters and an elder brother. From his father's side, Myaing has Mon ancestry, and hails from a long line of British colonial era senior civil servants and Konbaung period nobility. (Note: (Myaing 2005: 60–61): Myo Kyawt Myaing's four times paternal great grandmother Daw Auk was a younger sister of Kyawhtin Thihathu, ethnic Mon governor of Dala and better known by his personal name Maung Htaw Lay (or Taulay). After the First Anglo-Burmese War, Htaw Lay defected to the British in 1827. His family including Auk also followed Htaw Lay. After the Second Anglo-Burmese War, the British seized Yangon and named two major streets after Maung Htaw Lay and his son-in-law Maung Khaing, (both of which have been renamed since 1989). (Myaing 2005: 52–53, 61–63): Auk's sixth child Shwe Aye became mayor of Mudon. Myo Kyawt Myaing's paternal great grandfather Tha Myaing was a senior civil servant with the Imperial Forest Service in the early 20th century, and one of the first two Burmese to be admitted to then white-only Service. Tha Myaing was also a recipient of top ATM (Ahmudan-kaung Tazeik-ya Min) and KSM (Kyet-tha-yay-saung Shwe-Salwe-ya Min) titles. Moreover, per (Oung 2007: 191), May Oung, co-founder of the YMBA and Maj. Gen. Tun Hla Oung, the colonial era Police Commissioner, were Myo Kyawt Myaing's distant relatives.) He grew up in the affluent Seven-Mile Junction neighborhood, and attended the elite TTC School. He enrolled at the University of Yangon, majoring in geology in 1987 but was left stranded a year later when the military government shut down all the schools in the country, following the 8888 Uprising. (Note: (LA Times 25 July 2000): All non-military run colleges and universities in Myanmar were completely shut down between 1988 and 2000 except for 30 months.)

== Career ==
=== 1989–2000 ===
It was during this hiatus that his music career began in earnest. He had been dabbling in songwriting since 1986, and in 1989 founded a band called Virus 3. He came to decide that he would continue his education in a field related to music, and he enrolled at the SAE Institute, Singapore in 1990. After graduating from the school with a degree in audio and music production in 1992, he returned to Myanmar, and released his first album Moe Dway Ywa Nay Chein Khana later that year. The album consisted of mostly Eurodance-influenced tracks such as "Einmet Met De" and more conventional pop songs like "A-Chit Mya Zwa A-Twet" but also contained a remixed rap version of J Maung Maung's classic "Kyanaw Ma Kaung Bu". He followed up with his 1994 album Virus 3, whose title track "Rap N Roll" was essentially Eurodance-themed rap. Both albums were well received, and were to leave a lasting influence on the local music scene. He came to be recognized as the "godfather of Burmese rap" and someone who "introduced rap to Burmese listeners."

=== 2000–06 ===
Despite his notoriety as a rap pioneer, Myaing had always considered himself more than a rapper. His musical sensibilities lay more with remixing Eurodance and American rap hits and with creating more soulful, if heavily synthesized, love songs. His third album 2000 Remix (2000) showcased not only his remixing skills but also his songwriting skills. To be sure, his songwriting, like that of most Burmese pop songwriters of the day, consisted mainly of sampling or covering foreign songs and inserting Burmese lyrics in them. The artists he has sampled/covered range from the likes of Dr. Dre, Eminem, Snoop Dogg, NWA to Nirvana to Eurodance acts like Fatboy Slim and Rimini Project. (Note: For example, his "A-Hmat-Ta-Ya Thingyan" is based on Rimini Project's "Sounds Good". Fatboy Slim's "Funk Soul Brother" was also sampled.) He has also remixed and covered several Burmese hits of previous eras, ranging from older covers of Western songs like Gangawdaw Myo Aung's "Moe Baw Hma Nay Gyin De" to older original-tune hits like Mar Mar Aye's "Sinza Ya Ohn Me". A few of his songs are influenced by A-ha, one of his favorite music bands.

The 2000s saw his music increasingly charting its own course. The Burmese rap/hip-hop scene was turning more hardcore, with the success of Acid's debut album Sa-Tin Chein (2000). Myaing forged ahead with his own brand of dance themed, remixed, rap-influenced music, epitomized by "Thagya Min", and "A-Hmat-Ta-Ya Thingyan", as well as slower synthpop songs like "Hsu Taung Ge Bu De" and "Thissa Shi Gyay". In 2003, he declared his ambition to be more than a rapper with "Rap Thachin Hso Yin", naturally by rapping in both Burmese and English that he "absolutely does not like rap". To be sure, he never completely abandoned his rap roots or bravado. His 2004 "My Name is Myo Kyawt Myaing" announces that:

My name is Myo Kyawt Myaing
I'm from Seven-Mile
My father's U Kyawt Myaing and he's a pilot
My mother's a teacher...
I've had a lot of girlfriends
They're all temporary
As everybody knows, as everybody knows, as everybody knows

His unique brand of music achieved enormous success in Myanmar, culminating in Lu Phyit Ya De Dokkha (2004). Several songs from the album became his standards. His success enabled him to increase production values of his music videos for the Dokkha album.

=== 2007–present ===
At the peak of popularity in the mid-2000s, Myaing was involved in several compilation albums with other artists. Most of his albums since the late 2000s have been with other artists. Over his career, he has appeared in at least 34 compilation albums with other artists. He has released three major albums since 2009. He collaborated with the top film actress and singer Htun Aeindra Bo in Da-Ge Ma Chit Phe Ne (2009). In 2012, he released his first solo album Gaba Gyi A-Pyin-Bet since 2004 although the album included a few of his past hits like "Rap Thachin Hso Yin" and "Thissa Shi Gyay". His latest album Pyissoppan, featuring Alex and Yan Yan Chan, was released in 2013.

Myaing has devoted part of his time to teaching audio engineering since 2013 when he began working as a lecturer at the Myanmar Media Development Center.

== Personal life ==
Myaing has been married twice. He married Thwin Pa-Pa Aung, a physician, on his 39th birthday in 2010 but the marriage ended in divorce less than two months later on 24 June 2010. He married Jan Jann on 1 May 2013. The marriage ended in divorce in 2016. Remarried with Thin Thant Thant Thu in 2022.

== Discography ==
=== Albums ===
- Moe Dway Ywa Nay Chein Khana (1992)
- Virus 3 (1994)
- 2000 Remix (2000)
- A-Haung-Zon Tay Mya (1998)
- Thadi Ya Yin Pi Da Be (2000) with Kabya Bwe Hmu
- A-Kaung-Zon Tay Mya (2004) – Greatest Hits
- My Name is Myo Kyawt Myaing (2001)
- Myo Kyawt Myaing.Com(2002)
- Lu Phyit Ya De Dokkha (2004)
- Da-Ge Ma Chit Phe Ne (2009) with Htun Aeindra Bo
- Gaba Gyi A-Pyin-Bet (1993)
- Pyissoppan (2013) with Alex, Yan Yan Chan

=== Compilation albums ===
According to the Burmese music site, Myanmar MP3, Myo Kyawt Myaing has participated in at least 34 compilation albums.

== TV show ==
He was involved as a Judge in Myanmar Idol season 3 (2018).

== Bibliography ==
- "Myanmar Allows Higher Education to Fully Resume". Los Angeles Times. Associated Press. 25 July 2015.
- Byrnes, Sholto. On the Road to Myanmar's Mandalay. Vol. 135. London: New Statesman, Ltd.
- Glanville, Jo (2010). Smashed Hits 2.0: Music Under Pressure, Index on Censorship. SAGE Publications. ISBN 9780857025319.
- Korpe, Marie (2004). Shoot the Singer!: Music Censorship Today. Zed Books. p. 228. ISBN 9781842775059.
- Myaing, Myo Kyawt. "Myo Kyawt Myaing's Official Facebook page". Facebook.
- Myaing, Wai Wai (2005). A Journey in Time: Family Memoirs (Burma, 1914–1948). iUniverse. p. 210. ISBN 9780595356515.
- Myaing, Wai Wai (2015). Of Roots and Wings: A Memoir. iUniverse. p. 288. ISBN 9781491778715.
- "Myo Kyawt Myaing discography". Myanmar MP3.com.
- Oung, Kin Thida (2007). A Twentieth Century Burmese Matriarch. Lulu. p. 200. ISBN 9780557102297.
