= Htaw Lay =

Burmese magistrate and governor

Sitke Htaw Lay ထော်လေး KSM

Magistrate of the Provincial Civil Service of Moulmein
- In office 1838–1853
- Preceded by: New office

Governor of Dala
- In office 1805–1827
- Monarchs: Bodawpaya (1805–19); Bagyidaw (1819–27)

Personal details
- Born: 1776 Martaban, Konbaung Burma
- Died: 1869 or 1871 (aged 92 or 94) Twante, Burma, British India
- Spouse: Min Ya
- Relations: Mya Sein; May Oung; Tun Hla Oung; Myo Kyawt Myaing
- Children: 5, including: Daw Htu (2nd); Daw Hmya (3rd); Daw Mya May (5th)

Military service
- Allegiance: Konbaung dynasty
- Branch/service: Royal Burmese Army
- Years of service: 1824–26
- Rank: Commander
- Battles/wars: First Anglo-Burmese War

Maung Htaw Lay (Burmese: မောင်ထော်လေး, pronounced [màʊɴ tʰɔ̀ lé]; also spelled Maung Taulay; 1776–1869 or 1871) was Magistrate of Moulmein (Mawlamyine) from 1838 to 1853 during the early British colonial period of Myanmar (Burma), and governor of Dala from 1805 to 1827 during the Konbaung period. Prior to his defection to the British in 1827, he had been a Royal Burmese Army commander, and had fought in the First Anglo-Burmese War (1824–26). At Moulmein, Htaw Lay became one of the most senior indigenous officials in the colonial government. He moved to Yangon (Rangoon) in 1853 after the British annexation of Lower Burma. He successfully used his influence with the colonial government to stop the occupation forces' pillaging of Buddhist shrines around Yangon, and with the help of his son-in-law Maung Khaing, spent the rest of his life restoring the Shwedagon Pagoda.

The colonial government named two wide streets in downtown Yangon after him and Maung Khaing. The two street names survived the renaming of Yangon Streets until 1989. Some of his descendants became some of the most prominent members of the colonial era, including Mya Sein, May Oung, and Tun Hla Oung. The singer Myo Kyawt Myaing is his four times great-grandnephew.

== Early life and career ==
Born in Martaban (Mottama) in 1776, Htaw Lay was the eldest child of a leading ethnic Mon noble family in Lower Burma. He had three younger brothers and two younger sisters. His father had been a senior official in the service of Konbaung monarchs since King Alaungpaya. In 1805, Alaungpaya's fourth son King Bodawpaya appointed Htaw Lay governor (myoza) of Dala (modern Dala and Twante). (Note: (Oung 2007: 22) says that he was born in 1776, and became governor at age 30 (or 29 in Western reckoning). But the genealogical chart in the same book (Oung 2007: 191) shows that he was born in 1776 and became governor in 1804, meaning he was then no more than 28. If he was born in 1776 and became governor at 29, he most likely became governor in 1805.) His official style was Min Kyaw Thiha (မင်းကျော်သီဟ), and it was later upgraded to Kyawhtin Thihathu (ကျော်ထင် သီဟသူ).

In the First Anglo-Burmese War (1824–26), Htaw Lay was one of the commanding officers responsible for the defense of Yangon (across the river from Dala) against the British invaders. After an eight-month battle, the Burmese were ousted from Yangon in December 1824. He returned to a war-ravaged Dala as governor after the war's end in 1826. His kingdom had been defeated and left crippled in debt. (The British had returned Lower Burma in exchange for an agreement to pay an indemnity of one million pounds sterling as well as to cede Arakan, Assam, Manipur, and the Tenasserim coast south of the Sawleen. The war reparations, which were to be made in four installments, were to impose a huge burden on the populace in the following years.)

== Defection ==
Htaw Lay's days at Dala were numbered. A year after the war, the governor of the neighboring Syriam (Thanlyin), Gov. Smim Bawor (also known as Thamein Baru (သမိန်ဘရူး) and Maung Sat (မောင်စပ်)), a descendant of the Hanthawaddy royalty, revolted at the encouragement of the British. (Note: (Singer 1995: 57): Smim Bawor and his men were misled by the British Commander Archibald Campbell, who had just led the British to victory in the first war, that British military aid would be forthcoming. Bawor was so confident that he declared himself king.) The Ava court believed that Htaw Lay was also involved in the rebellion. But according to Htaw Lay's family tradition, Htaw Lay was not involved in the rebellion; he and his family fled to British territory only because they feared the indiscriminate wrath of the king's forces. At any rate, Htaw Lay and his extended family, along with about 2,000 other refugees, (Note: Htaw Lay family tradition (Oung 2007: 22) says 20,000 people fled. But (Singer 1995: 57) gives "nearly 2000".) fled Lower Burma and settled at Moulmein (Mawlamyaing) on the Tenasserim coast (modern Mon State, south of the Salween and Taninthayi Region) that Ava had just ceded a year earlier.

== Magistrate of Moulmein ==
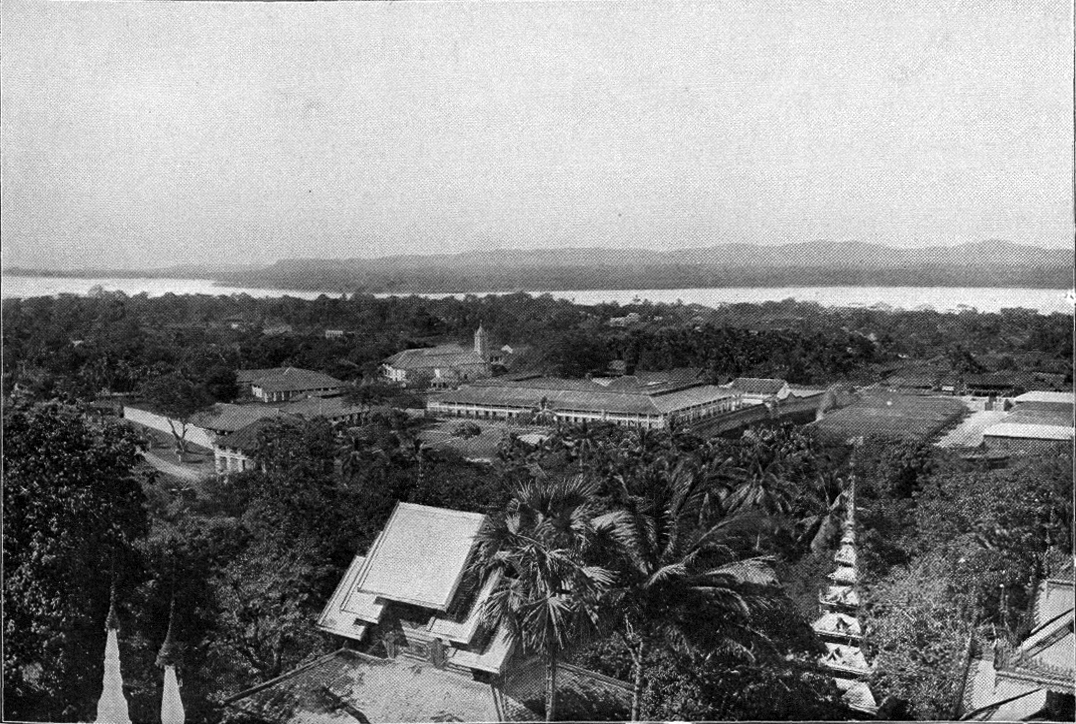
Moulmein, early 20th century

Moulmein then was still a small town across the Salween from Htaw Lay'shometownn Martaban, which had been the traditional capital of the Martaban province and remained Burmese. The British were to turn the small town into a major city. They made Moulmein, alongside Akyab (Sittwe) in Arakan (Rakhine), a co-capital of British Burma. Htaw Lay, already a leader of the refugees, inevitably became part of the burgeoning colonial administration. The British first appointed him to a minor military office in July 1833, and then in 1838 to the office of sitke (lit. "general" in Burmese but officially the "Magistrate of the Provincial Civil Service"), which had "police and judicial powers."

At 62, Htaw Lay became one of the highest ranking indigenous officials in the early colonial administration. Another indigenous sitke was Myat Phyu, a brother-in-law of King Bodawpaya and ex-governor of Shwegyin, who too had defected in 1832. The British made Myat Phyu sitke of North Moulmein. The two former governors made an alliance by marrying Ma Htu, daughter of Htaw Lay and Maung Khaing, son of Myat Phyu.

Htaw Lay remained in office for the next 15 years, working from his home office in the later years. According to Htaw Lay family tradition, he was conflicted about British rule. Though trade and commerce flourished under British rule, the devout Buddhist was alarmed that Moulmein's Buddhist identity was fading away. According to an 1871 stone inscription on the terrace of the Kyaikthanlan Pagoda, Htaw Lay used his powers to stem the tide as much as possible by restoring Buddhist monasteries and pagodas around the town. His main project was the pagoda itself, the principal Buddhist shrine of the town. He led a group of local leaders to restore the pagoda at a total cost of 10,000 rupees. He retired from office in 1853 right after the Second Anglo-Burmese War in order to devote full-time to restore the shrines in Yangon, which the British had just seized. The area of Moulmein where he lived was named Sitkegon ("General's Hill") in his honor.

== Later life ==
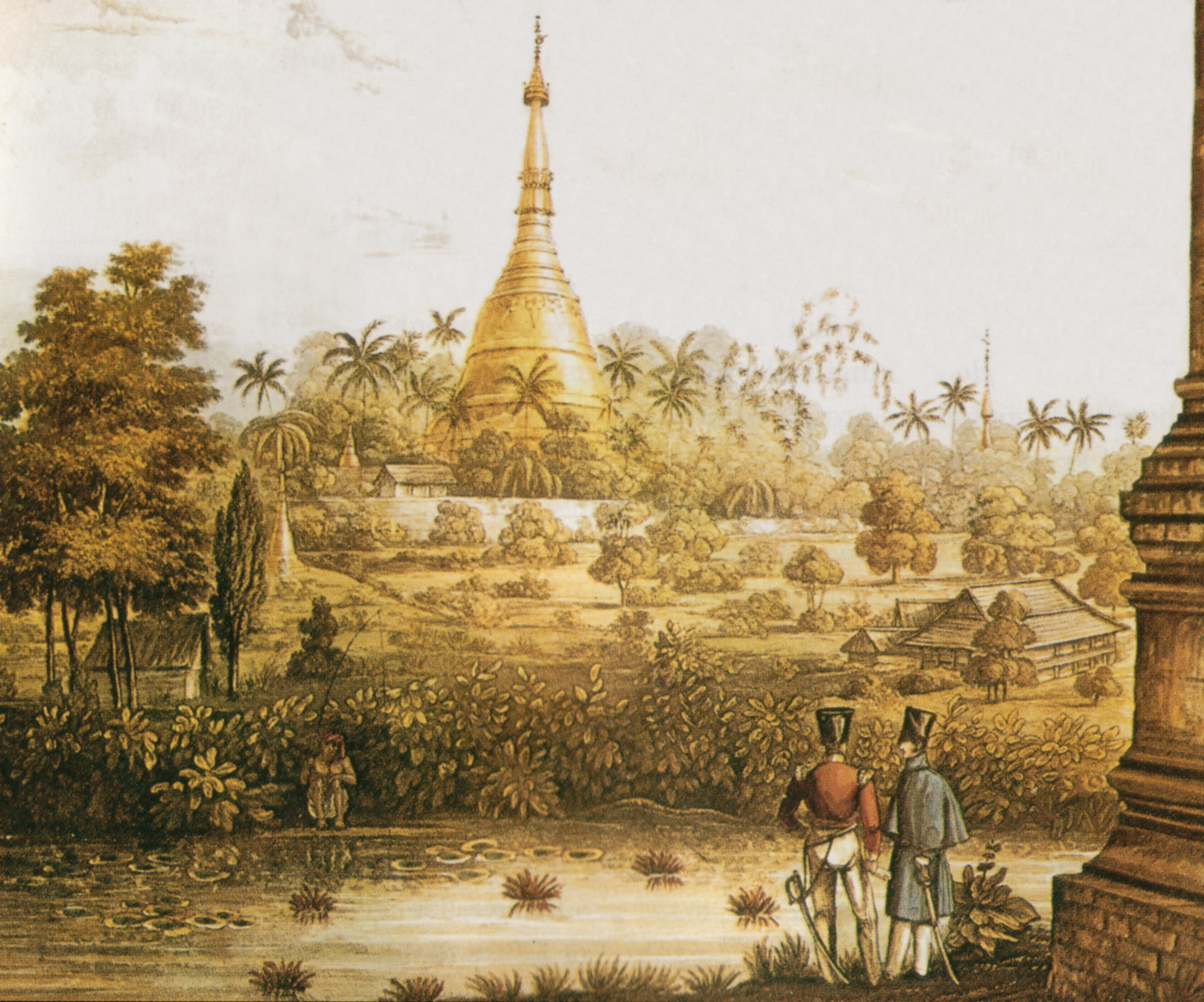
View of the Shwedagon in 1825

The ex-sitke was to spend the rest of his life based out of Yangon. His overriding zeal was to restore the Buddhist shrines pillaged during the war. He was joined by his son-in-law Khaing, whom the colonial government had just appointed governor of Dala (and shortly after as sitke of Yangon). The duo would lead the restoration and rebuilding Buddhist shrines and monasteries around Yangon.

At the top of their list was the Shwedagon Pagoda, the most sacred shrine in Burmese Buddhism. The pagoda had been used as a fort by the British during the war, and had been severely damaged by the British troops and their Indian sepoys. The most egregious act of desecration, to the Burmese, was the British commanders' decision to have their sepoys make 1.8 m wide, 45 cm long and 60 m deep penetrations into the pagoda, ostensibly to assess its utility as an arsenal. Htaw Lay had written to the British commander and to the India Office in London to stop the desecration but his pleas were ignored during the war. But after the war he found a more receptive ear with the incoming colonial administration led by Commissioner Arthur Purves Phayre. He got the Phayre government to stop the looting of the treasure chambers of Buddhist shrines by the occupation troops, and to provide some compensation for the damages done to the Shwedagon. He and Khaing went on to lead the restoration and re-gilding of the Shwedagon with public support and donations. (Note: (Moore 2013: 244): An 1875 inscription on four stones (95 x 75 cm) donated by Htaw Lay’s daughters and Khaing to Naungdawgyi Pagoda installed on the northeast corner of the Shwedagon platform commemorates their gift, including 25 viss, 63 ticals, and 14 annas of gold.) In about two years, the duo was able to restore much of the great shrine. He became one of the founding trustees of the Shwedagon Pagoda Trust.

The colonial government was pleased with Htaw Lay and Khaing. In particular, Governor-General of India James Broun-Ramsay of Dalhousie on his last visit to Yangon in 1855 was impressed by the progress made at the Shwedagon, and with Htaw Lay and Khaing. (Note: (Singer 1995: 81): Dalhousie also donated 300 rupees to the pagoda.) Dalhousie saw the value in loyal, "pious and capable" indigenous figures, and included Htaw Lay and Khaing in the list of figures after whom the new roads and streets of Yangon were to be named. Two wide streets in downtown Yangon came to be named "Sitke Maung Taulay Street" and "Sitke Maung Khaing Street". Both Htaw Lay and Khaing were also awarded the title of KSM (Kyet-tha-yay-saung Shwe-salwe-ya Min), the highest honor for public service bestowed by the colonial government.

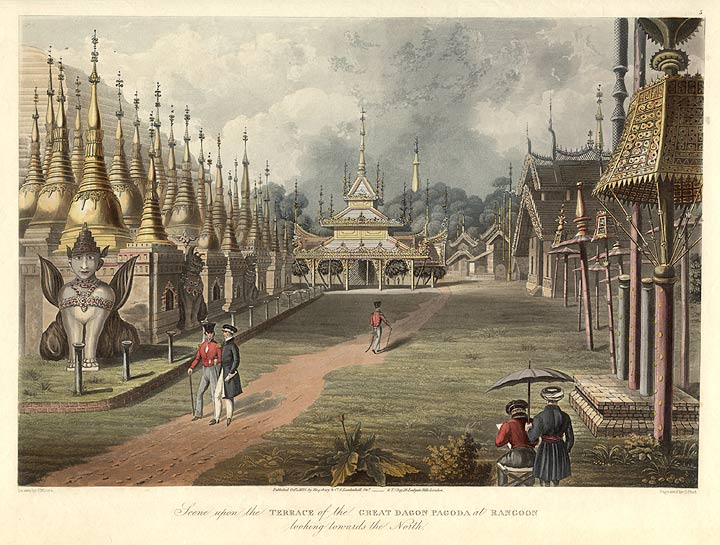
The Shwedagon during the First Anglo-Burmese War (1824–26)

To be sure, there were limits to the duo's influence with the colonial government. They could not prevent smaller ancient shrines that lined from downtown Yangon to the Shwedagon from being razed (in order to make way for the new grid-lined Yangon the British were building). Nor could they replace the damaged hti (crowning umbrella) of the Shwedagon for nearly two decades. (The hti affair came to represent the sovereignty dispute of Lower Burma. As the Burmese government had not recognized the British annexation of Lower Burma, the British sent back the new hti donated by King Mindon in 1853. Only in 1871 after long negotiations did the British permit Mindon's new hti to be shipped to Yangon. (Note: (Singer 1995: 91) and (Moore 2013: 244): The Mandalay-made hti was made of iron; its seven tiers were 9.5 m high with a 4.5 m long vane. It was transported on a royal barge that arrived in Yangon on 22 October 1871.))

It is not clear if Htaw Lay ever witnessed the raising of the new hti. According to Kin Thida Oung, a direct descendant of Htaw Lay, he died in 1871 but others such as Noel Singer and Wai Wai Myaing, a direct descendant of Htaw Lay's younger sister Auk, say he died in 1869.

== Legacy ==
Htaw Lay's descendants became one of the leading indigenous families of colonial Burma. May Oung, co-founder of the YMBA, was his great-grandson. His great-granddaughter was the wife of Maung Kin, the first Burmese to be knighted and the first Burmese Chief Justice of the High Court. Kin and Oung were the first two Burmese to become High Court justices. Mya Sein, the first Burmese woman to graduate from Oxford University, was born to Htaw Lay's great-granddaughter Thein Mya. Maj. Gen. Tun Hla Oung, the colonial era Police Commissioner, was Htaw Lay's two times great-grandson. Myo Kyawt Myaing, a popular singer-songwriter, is his four times great-grandnephew.

The streets that bore his and Khaing's names survived until 1989. (Note: (Myaing 2005: 61) incorrectly says that Maung Taulay and Maung Khaing Streets were renamed in the "Socialist era in the 1970s". But per (Aung Myoe 2006: 8), the renaming took place in 1989, a year after the Socialist era had ended.) The two streets escaped the initial round of renaming of Yangon's streets to Burmese names after independence. In 1989, the new military government renamed not only the country's English name from Burma to Myanmar but also the rest of the colonial era street names of Yangon and the name of Yangon itself (from Rangoon). The Maung Taulay Street became Bo Sun Pet Street.

== Bibliography ==
- Aung Myoe, Maung (November 2006). The Road to Naypyitaw: Making Sense of the Myanmar Government's Decision to Move its Capital (PDF). Singapore: Asia Research Institute, National University of Singapore.
- Coryton, John (1870). Letter to the Liverpool Chamber of Commerce on the Prospects of a Direct Trade Route to China Through Moulmein. Moulmein: T. Whittam. p. 102.
- Htin Aung, Maung (1967). A History of Burma. New York and London: Cambridge University Press.
- Moore, Elizabeth Howard (2013). Pagoda Desecration and Myanmar Archaeology, 1853–86 (PDF). SOAS, University of London.
- Moore, Elizabeth Howard (2013). Materializing Southeast Asia's Past: Selected Papers from the 12th International Conference of the European Association of Southeast Asian Archaeologists. Vol. 2 (illustrated ed.). NUS Press. p. 308. ISBN 9789971696559.
- Myaing, Wai Wai (2005). A Journey in Time: Family Memoirs (Burma, 1914–1948). iUniverse. p. 210. ISBN 9780595356515.
- Myint-U, Thant (2006). The River of Lost Footsteps--Histories of Burma. Farrar, Straus and Giroux. ISBN 978-0-374-16342-6.
- Oung, Kin Thida (2007). A Twentieth Century Burmese Matriarch. Lulu. p. 200. ISBN 9780557102297.
- Singer, Noel F. (1995). Old Rangoon: City of the Shwedagon (illustrated ed.). Paul Strachan. p. 214. ISBN 9781870838474.
- Yangon City Development Committee (1997). Shwedagon, Symbol of Strength and Serenity. Yangon: Yangon City Development Committee. p. 317.
