= J-Me =

Burmese rapper and singer

J-Me ဂျေမီ
- Born: Khant Zin Ko; 9 September 1985 (age 40); Yangon, Myanmar
- Genres: Hip hop; rap
- Occupations: Rapper; singer
- Years active: 2000–present

Khant Zin Ko (Burmese: ဂျေမီ; born on 9 September 1985), better known as J-Me, is a Burmese hip hop singer and rapper who began his musical career in the 2000s. He has been dubbed as the "Myanmar's Underground Hip Hop Legend" for his hip hop works and successful music career.

== Early life ==
J-Me was born on 9 September 1985 to Aung Ko Latt (James Patrick), a director, and Tin Moe Khaing (Marie Conway), a half-Irish singer. He has one elder sister, Michelle Anne Latt.

== Career ==
J-Me began his career in 2000. Around the age of 13 to 18, he attended frequent rap group shows held in parks, including Myaw Sin Kyun in Kandawgyi Lake. He featured alongside rapper Ye Lay and began rising to fame. His first hit song "Burn Em' Up" caused him to gain popularity. His subsequent hit song "Hallelujah" is known as one of his most popular rap songs.

=== Influence ===
J-Me has been rapping and beat-boxing for almost 10 years. He has tread carefully with his lyrics, and avoids directly criticizing the government in his lyrics. In addition to his work in the pop-culture field, his older sister used to break dance back in the 1990s. It was through her that J-Me first heard hip hop in the 1990s, when they would both listen to her MC Hammer and Vanilla Ice records. J-Me, Zayar Thaw, and other members of Myanmar's first hip-hop group, Acid, have been considered inspirational because of their social activism– marrying traditionally Western hip-hop beats with issues close to the hearts of people in Myanmar.

=== Notable work ===
He became one of the leaders of the growing underground subculture of Myanmar, including graffiti artists and political activists. One of J-Me's English-language songs, titled "Burn 'Em Up", gives a shout-out not only to US artists Fabolous, Ryan Leslie and Nas but also to the city of Bangkok, a growing centre in Southeast Asia that promotes international hip-hop.

=== Departure and comeback ===
In 2014, J-Me took a break from the hip hop scene. He was struggling with addiction and cycling through relapses and rehab. In an interview with the Myanmar Times in 2018, J-Me, then 33, discussed his absence and changes in his lifestyle. During his retreat, he had given up using, drinking, and smoking, and became an born-again Christian.

J-Me's album A Mwe Sar A Mwe Khan, which means "Inheritance", is about his personal story and transformation. It was produced by Sun Music Production and released across Myanmar on 26 May 2018.

=== Other work ===
In addition to his music career, J-Me has produced films and worked as a columnist for the Myanmar Times, a job he began in 2013 and held for several years.

== SEA Games ==
One of his songs, "Born to Win", was chosen as the anthem for Myanmar athletes at the 2013 Southeast Asian Games, held in Myanmar on 22 December 2013. The song, performed with the singer Zara Hnin Thwin on vocals, has J-Me rapping about "persistence" in a dedication to the young athletes and their fans.

== Personal life ==
J-Me married Jungmaw Mary on 7 September 2011. J-Me identifies as a Catholic.

== Discography ==
=== Single albums ===
- Ko Bawa Nae Ko ကိုယ့်ဘဝနဲ့ကိုယ် (2007)
- Bawa Ye Neibban ဘဝရဲ့နိဗ္ဗာန် (2012)
- A Mwe Sar A Mwe Khan အမွေစားအမွေခံ (2018)
- Yangon to Cyprus (with Hein Gyii) (2025)

=== Mixtape ===
It is what it is(2023)

== See also ==
- Burmese hip hop
