= Khine =

Khine is a Burmese first name & surname. Notable people with the surname include:

- Chan Chor Khine (1886–1934), Burmese businessman
- May Thet Khine (born 1989), Burmese actress
- Michelle Khine, American bioengineer
- Nan Aye Khine (born 1976), Burmese weightlifter
- Phu Pwint Khine, Burmese footballer
