= Chan Mah Phee =

Chinese businessman

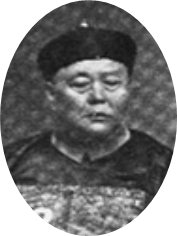
- Chan Mah Phee
- Born: Amoy, China
- Occupations: businessman, land-owner and investor
- Spouse: Aye Mya
- Children: Chan Chor Hlaing, Chan Chor Khine, Chan Chor Paing

Chan Mah Phee (Chinese: 曾廣庇; Pe̍h-ōe-jī: Chan Kóng-pì; born in Amoy, China) was a Hoklo Chinese businessman, land-owner, investor and philanthropist who founded numerous successful ventures in Rangoon (now Yangon), Burma, in 1800s and 1900s.

== Early life ==
Chan was born in Amoy, Fujian, China, in the nineteenth century to his father Chan Ee Shin. In 1870, Chan migrated to Singapore before ultimately moving to Rangoon in 1872.

== Rangoon ==
Chan Mah Phee founded his most successful business Taik Leong Co. in Rangoon in 1883. The company dealt primarily in oil, rice and tobacco. Chan Mah Phee was also a director of The Chinese Steamship Co., Limited. Chan was the largest Chinese land owner and most important Chinese rice-dealer in Burma. In a Rangoon where communities remained voluntarily segregated down ethnic lines, he managed to be a prominent figure in Rangoon with many connections which extended far beyond the municipality's Chinese community.

== Philanthropic work ==
Chan Mah Phee and Daw Aye Mya built a tazaung at the Shwedagon Pagoda. They also offered satuditha at the Tabaung festival. They also donated to build Hwa Kyone High School (later known as No 3 Regional College / Kyimyindine Campus, Rangoon University). They built Chan Mah Phee hospital in Ahlon where a street was named in his honor. In 1903, he financed the substantial expansion of Kheng Hock Keong, a Hokkien temple in Yangon.

== Legacy ==
The Chan Ma Phee hall of Shwedagon Pagoda was named in his honor in recognition of his patronage and financial contributions to the temple. He married Aye Mya, the daughter of rice farmers in a Rangoon suburb. Chan Mah Phee's second son, Chan Chor Khine inherited and expanded his father's businesses. Chan Chor Khine was educated at St. Paul's High School, Rangoon.
