= Basic Education High School No. 6 Botataung =

Coordinates: 16°46′38″N 96°09′57″E

Botataung 6 High School
- အ.ထ.က. (၆) ဗိုလ်တထောင်
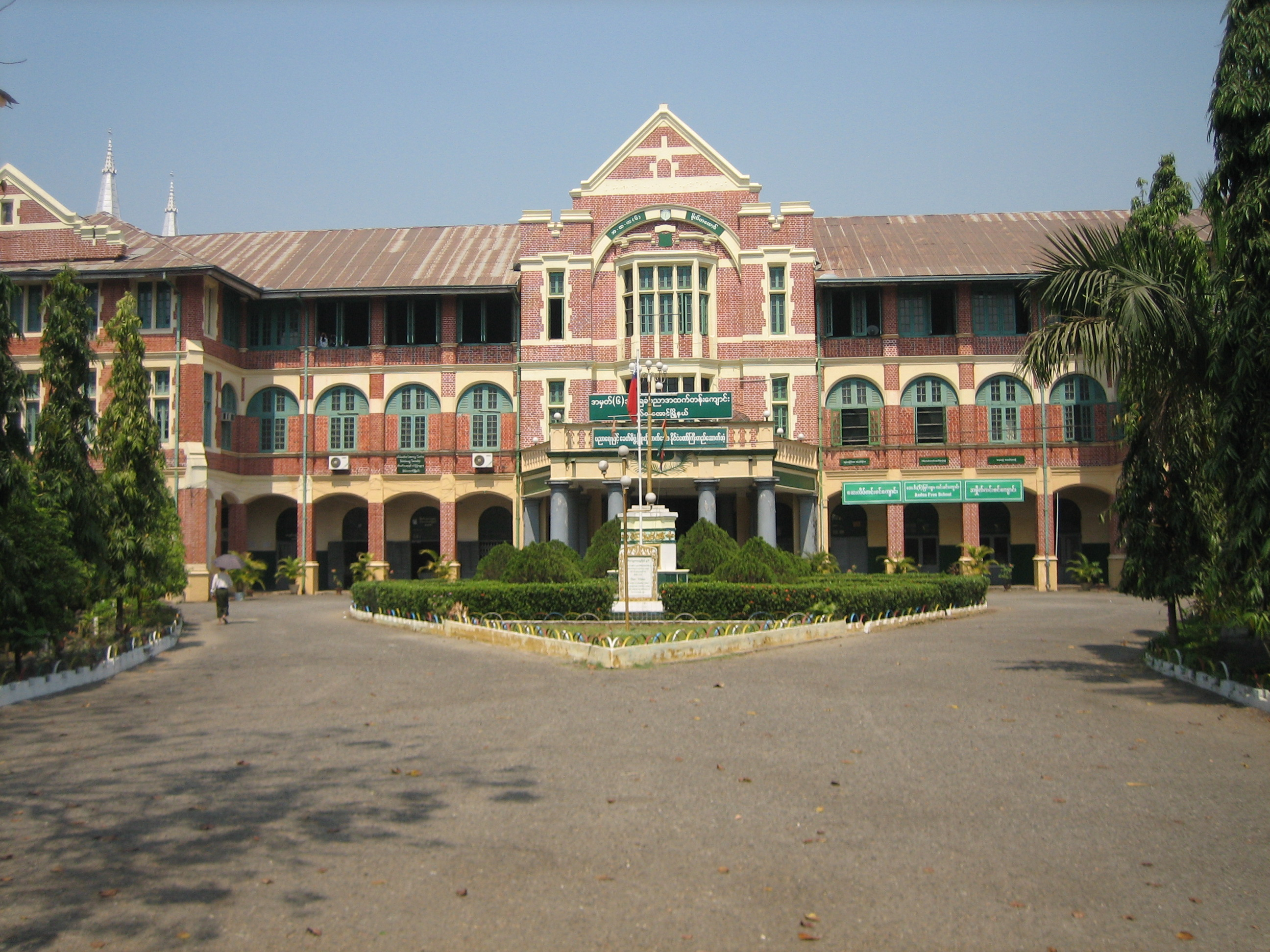
- Main Hall of Botataung 6 High School

Location
- Anawrahta Road, Botataung; Yangon, Yangon Region; Myanmar

Information
- Type: Public
- Established: 1860
- School number: 6
- Principal: Dr. Kyaw Soe Naing
- Grades: K-10
- Enrollment: ~5,000
- Nickname: Saint Paul

Designations

Yangon City Landmark

Basic Education High School (BEHS) No. 6 Botataung (Burmese: အခြေခံ ပညာ အထက်တန်း ကျောင်း အမှတ် (၆) ဗိုလ်တထောင်; abbreviated to အ.ထ.က. (၆) ဗိုလ်တထောင်; commonly known as Botataung 6 High School or St. Paul's High School), located a few miles east of downtown Yangon in Botataung township, is a public high school, and one of the oldest high schools in Myanmar. The school initially offered three kindergarten classes - Lower, Middle, and Higher, known as LKG, MKG, HKG, and First through Tenth Standard. It now offers classes from kindergarten to Tenth Standard (or Grade 1 through Grade 11 in the new nomenclature).

Known during the British colonial days as St. Paul's English High School, the Roman Catholic parochial school was the top school of choice for the children of the elite. Many of the country's who's who in those days were alumni of St. Paul's. St. Paul’s had a “Roll of Honor” for outstanding students in the High School Final (HSF) and Matriculation examinations from 1951 - 1963.

The school was nationalized in 1965. While it is no longer the leading high school it once was, the school continues to be among the better (certainly among the better known) high schools in Yangon, serving mostly the children of middle-class families from downtown Yangon and nearby areas.

The school's main three-story red brick colonial era building is a landmark protected by the city, and is listed on the Yangon City Heritage List.

== History ==
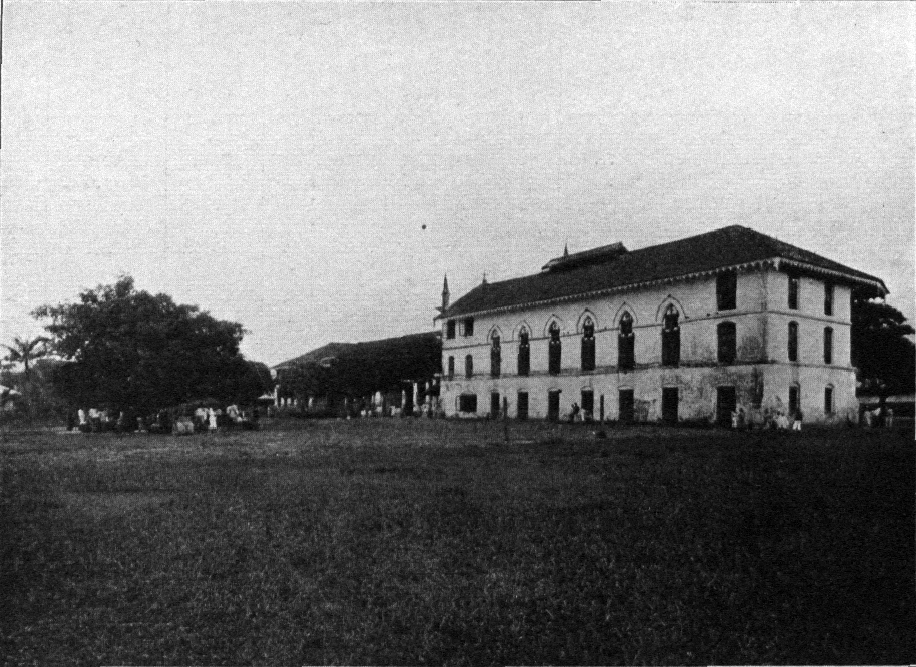
St. Paul's High School in the early 1900s

The school was founded as St. Paul's English High School by the De La Salle Brothers, a Roman Catholic order in August 1860, eight years after the British had annexed Yangon and all of Lower Myanmar. It was the second La Sallian high school in the country. (St. Patrick's High School in Mawlamyine was the first La Sallian high school and founded in April 1860.) The initial school was a wooden building on Barr Street (now Maha Bandula Park Street) and moved to its present site in 1886. Between 1900 and 1908, two new Thomas Swales-designed wings were added. Later in the 1930s, a study hall and refectory were extended.

The all-boys school was among the few early schools that educated the children of the country's British officers, the Anglo-Burmese, the Anglo-Indians and the wealthy Burmese. Naturally, many of the notable colonial era names were St. Paul's alumni. The language of instruction was mainly English in the early days, and bi-lingual for some classes in the later days. Latin, science and higher mathematics were taught in the senior classes. Special interest classes such as Painting, and Carpentry and Woodcarving were also offered. The highlights of the school year were the annual sports and school concerts.

In April 1965, when Gen. Ne Win's military government nationalized private schools, the school was renamed "Basic Education High School (BEHS) No. 6 Botataung". The primary language of instruction became Burmese. The school, which used to have a "Roll of Honor" for its outstanding students, steadily lost significance partly due to the new requirement to attend nearby schools as much as possible. Nevertheless, the school is still considered among the top high schools in Myanmar. Many well-to-do and wealthy families prefer to send their children to TTC and Dagon 1 High School. The elite do not hesitate to send their kids to English language private schools that cost US$8000 or more annually. Today, Botataung 6 attracts mostly the children of middle-class families from downtown Yangon.

The school has produced two top-ranked students, who finished first in the country's highly competitive University Entrance Examinations, one in 1974 and another in 1984.

== Admissions ==
Although the schools are nominally free in Myanmar, in reality, parents still have to pay for school maintenance, donations and registration fees as well as books and uniforms. The overall costs quickly become considerable, even for middle-class parents when the cost for evening tuition classes are factored in.

== Curriculum ==
The school offers classes from K through 10 in two daily shifts. (The Burmese education system is based on the colonial 11-year secondary school curriculum although most other countries are on a 13-year curriculum.) The early shift handles K through 4 and the second shift does 5 through 10. Due to the use of two shifts and the availability of a large number of classrooms, the class size at Botataung 6 is around 40 to 50, much lower than 70-80 students in a typical Burmese classroom.

The school which produced notable scholars in the past has succumbed to the prevailing teaching style based mainly on memorization and rote learning. Due to severe lack of funding, the school's library and labs are rarely used. Teachers teach for and students study for the exams. Most students attend specialized private classes (locally called tuition classes) for specific subjects. In a world where teachers must supplement their abysmally low salaries, many of the private classes are given by the teachers (ignoring the conflict of interest) with the primary focus on exam-specific topics.

== Campus ==
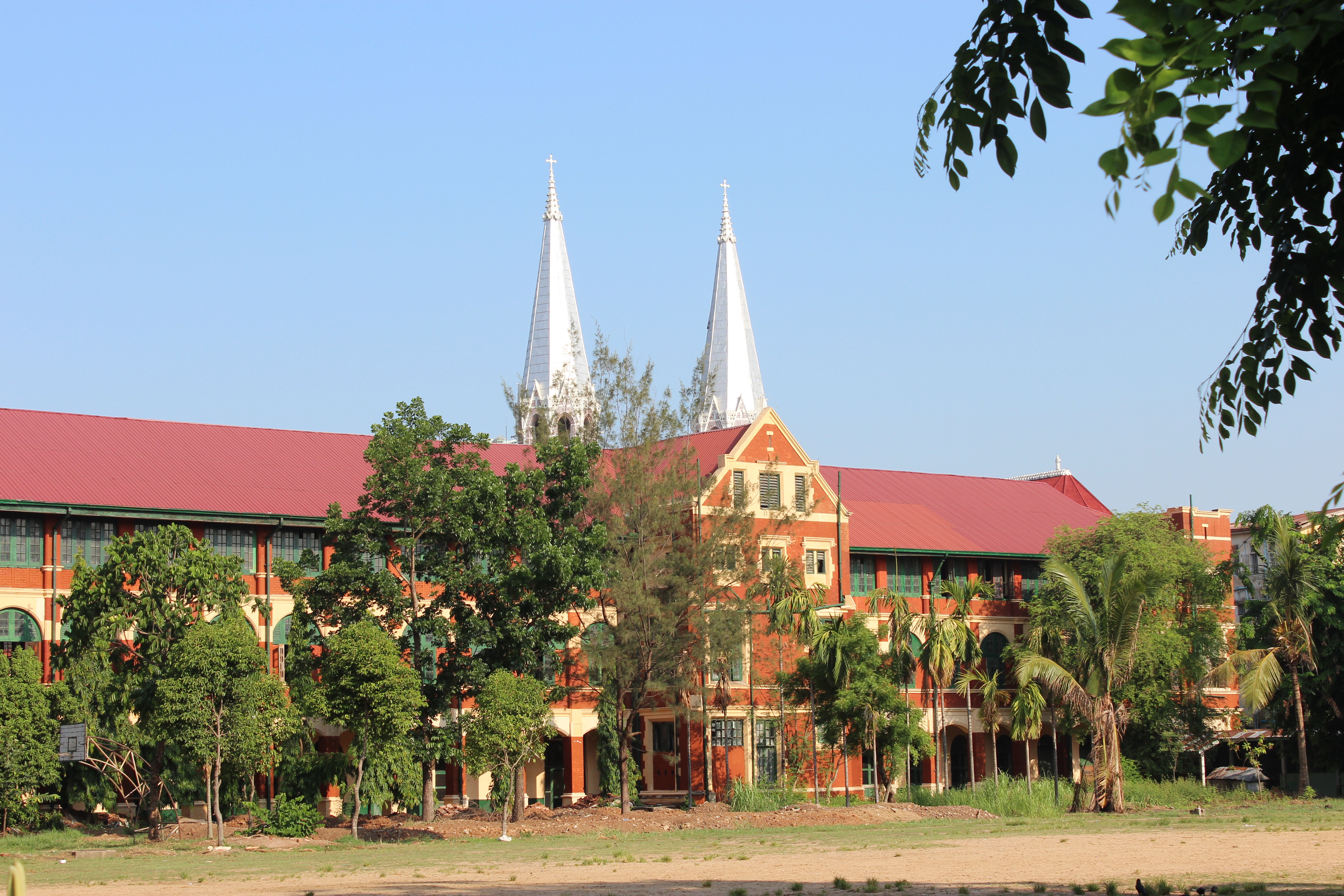
The East Wing as seen from Theinbyu Road

Botataung 6 is one of the few high schools in Myanmar with a sizable campus, covering perhaps 75% of the entire city square block. The compound of St. Mary's Cathedral, north of the school, takes up the other 25% of the block. The school is bounded by Theinbyu Road to the east, Anawrahta Road to the south and Aung Kyaw Road to the west. The former Secretariat Compound, where Gen. Aung San was assassinated, is located across Anawrahta Road. The all-girls Botataung 4 High School (formerly, St. Mary's Convent School) and co-ed Botataung 5 High School are located in the vicinity of the school.

The gated campus consists of some of the best facilities available in Myanmar:

- Landmark U-shaped three-story main building—East and West wings house ten classrooms each, labeled A through J; also a Physics laboratory and a Chemistry laboratory
- Aung Kyaw Hall, two-story annex building; houses school's main auditorium and school library
- Aung San Hall, two-story annex building
- Regulation size football pitch
- Smaller practice football pitch; also used as an outdoor volleyball court
- One indoor basketball/volleyball court
- Two tennis courts; also double as basketball courts
- Cafeteria

== Alumni ==
=== Academia and medicine ===
Name	Notability	References
Ba Than	First Burmese police surgeon in British Burma; Founder of wartime hospital and medical school during the Japanese occupation First rector of the Institute of Medicine 1, Rangoon (1964–1971)	
Htin Aung	Scholar of Burmese culture and history Rector, Rangoon University (1946–1958); Burmese Ambassador to Sri Lanka (1959–1962)	
Sithu U Kaung	First chairman of Myanmar Historical Commission; Director of Education (1951–1957); Member of Currency Board of Burma	
San Baw	Pioneer of use of ivory prosthesis in hip replacements Chief of Orthopaedic Surgery, Mandalay General Hospital (1957–1975); Chief of Orthopaedic Surgery, Rangoon General Hospital (1975–1980)	
Tha Hla Shwe	7th Rector of the University of Medicine 2, Yangon; President of the Myanmar Red Cross Society	
Than Nyun	Rector, Yangon Institute of Economics (1993); Deputy Minister of Education (1994–1999); Member, ASEAN Eminent Persons Group	

=== Business ===
Name	Notability	References
Chan Chor Khine	Burmese-Chinese businessman and philanthropist Honorary magistrate of the Corporation of Rangoon	
Lim Chin Tsong	A tycoon in the early 20th century and a member of the Legislative Council of Burma	
Serge Pun	Chairman, Serge Pun & Associates	

=== Literature and arts ===
Name	Notability	References
Richard Bartholomew	Burmese born Indian photographer, art critic, writer	
Htin Aung	Scholar of Burmese culture and history Rector, University of Yangon (1946–1958); Burmese Ambassador to Sri Lanka (1959–1962)	
Maung Maung Gyi	Famous pre-war watercolorist First Burmese to travel abroad for studies in Western painting	
Min Lu	Writer, screenwriter, poet	
Min Theinkha	Bestselling author of Sarpalin (Surveillant) Hnin Maung detective series	
Maung Thit Min	Songwriter, poet, writer	

=== Music and cinema ===
Name	Notability	References
Khine Htoo	Popular singer in the 1980s	
Zinyaw Maung Maung	Two-time Myanmar Academy Award winning director	
Bunny Phyoe	Hip-hop singer	
Thu Maung	Myanmar Academy Award winning actor, singer and writer	
Maung Wunna	Two-time Myanmar Academy Award winning director	
Yan Yan Chan	Hip-hop singer; of band ACID	
Ye Lay	Popular Burmese hip hop artist	

=== Politics and government ===
Name	Notability	References
Aung Zan Wai	Minister of Social Services, former cabinet secretary in the government of Burma (Myanmar).	
Muhammad Abdul Rauf	First diplomat from India to Burma (Myanmar) after independence. Served from Independence to 1952. Served as ambassador to Japan and Canada respectively.	
Ba Cho	Minister of Information (1946–1947), one of the senior government officials assassinated on 19 July 1947; Publisher of Deedok newspaper	
Ba Khin	First Accountant General of the Union of Burma; Leading Theravada Buddhist philosopher and propagator of Vipassanā meditation in the Ledi tradition	
Ba Maw	Prime Minister of Burma during the British and Japanese colonial administrations (1937–1940; 1942–1945)	
Maung Khin	First Burmese Chief Justice of the High Court (1921–1924) during the British rule First Burmese to be knighted	
Taw Phaya	Burmese Prince and Pretender to the Throne of Burma (abolished in 1885)	
Tin Tut	First Burmese ICS officer One of the four Burmese signatories to the Aung San–Attlee Agreement; Finance Minister, (1946–1947); First Foreign Minister, Union of Burma (1948)	
Nay Phone Latt	Blogger; Writer; Former political prisoner; Secretary for PEN Myanmar; Executive Director of MIDO (2007–present)	
Zeyar Thaw	Former political prisoner; MP, Pyithu Hluttaw (2012–2021)	

=== Sports ===
Name	Notability	References
Walter Chit Tun	Myanmar's first bodybuilder	

== Former headteachers ==
The following is a list of headmasters since nationalization in 1965.

- Thant Gyi (1965)
- Captain Ba Hein (1965–69)
- Myat Htun (1969–79)
- Tun Aung (1980–81)
- Thein Kyi (1981)
- Tin Tun (1981–83)
- Min Maung (1983–90)
- Kyaw Myint (1990–95)
- Win Naing (1995–96)
- Kyi Than (1996–2003)
- Khin Maung Soe (2003–05)
- Maung Lone (2005–07)
- Dr. Win Min Latt (2007–10)
- Dr. Kyaw Soe Naing (2010–12)
- Thein Win (2012–13)
- Kyaw Kyaw Tun (2014–18)
- Swe Swe Hlaing (2018 - 2022)
