= War of Heroes - The PDF Game =

2022 video game

- Developer: Ko Thoot
- Publisher: GZ Entertainment Studio
- Platforms: Android; iOS
- Release: March 2022
- Genre: Shooter
- Mode: Single-player

War of Heroes - The PDF Game is a singleplayer mobile game developed by Ko Thoot in early 2022, named for the People's Defence Force of Myanmar. The game takes inspiration from real events in the Myanmar Civil War. Ko Thoot further stated that the character artwork is based on a diverse range of real anti-junta fighters that include doctors, the LGBTQ community, Muslims and other groups.

== Impact and restrictions ==
According to Ko Toot, War of Heroes raised approximately over $500,000 via revenue from in-game ads. The funds are then donated to PDF guerrillas.

The State Administration Council military junta banned the game on 24 April 2023; they claimed that the game slandered the Tatmadaw and encouraged sedition.

Initially releasing as just The PDF Game, Apple removed it from the App Store, and claimed that the game violated its policy against games that “[target a] real world government, corporation, or any other real entity”. After changing the name to War of Heroes and amending the artwork, the game was reinstated.

Google requested Ko Thoot to rename the game as they were concerned that the game violated guidelines against allowing games that “capitalise on or are insensitive toward a sensitive event” on Google Play. However, the game was ultimately left up after the name change as the moderators deemed that it “intends to alert users or to raise awareness” about the Myanmar Civil War.

== See also ==
End Game: Union Multiplayer- Multiplayer mobile game that has a similar Myanmar Civil War setting
