= Mya Sein =

Daw Mya Sein
- ဒေါ်မြစိန်
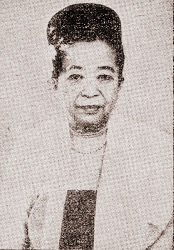
- Born: Mya Sein; 13 October 1904; Moulmein, Burma, British India
- Died: 10 November 1988 (aged 84)
- Education: Rangoon University; Oxford University (B. Litt.)
- Occupations: Historian, educator, writer
- Known for: Burmese writer
- Spouse: Shwe Baw (m. 1933–1937)
- Children: Mya Baw; Mya Thandar
- Parent(s): May Oung; Thein Mya
- Relatives: Tha Doe Oung (brother); Tun Hla Oung (brother); Htaw Lay (great-great-grandfather)

Daw Mya Sein (Burmese: ဒေါ်မြစိန်; 13 October 1904 – 10 November 1988) was a Burmese writer, educator and historian. She led the Burma Women's Council, served as a representative of Asia for the League of Nations in 1931, and as a representative at the Geneva Women's Conference; she was recommended for roundtable attendance by the British government and by several international women's organizations.

== Early life and education ==
Mya Sein was born in Moulmein (present-day Mawlamyine), British Burma. She was the youngest child of three of May Oung, a politician and legal scholar who served the Minister of Home Affairs of British Burma, and his wife Thein Mya, a great-granddaughter of Htaw Lay, Governor of Dala. Mya Sein attended the Diocesan Girl's High School and St. Mary's SPG High School. She was ranked as the fifth best high school student in the whole country in 1919.

Mya Sein continued her education at Rangoon College, ranking first and awarded the Jardin Prize. She graduated from Rangoon University in 1927 then attended St. Hugh's College, Oxford University in 1928. Mya Sein was the first Burmese woman to graduate from Oxford University.

== Career and works ==
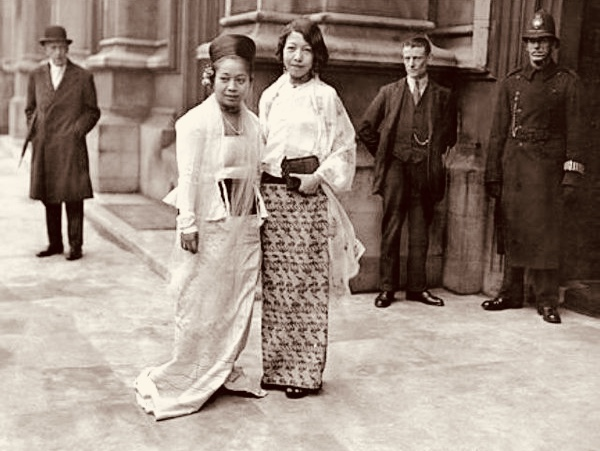
Daw Mya Sein at Burma Round Table Conference London in 1931

From 1931 to 1933, Mya Sein served as a representative to the All Asian Women’s Conference in India and to the League of Nations in Geneva, Switzerland. She also led the Burma Women's Council.

Mya Sein attended the Burma Round Table Conference in London, despite how the Governor of Burma, Charles Alexander Innes, had not wanted her to be appointed due to her age and gender. Her attendance was supported by the male Burmese delegates and international organisations including the Women’s Freedom League (WFL) and Equal Rights International.

From 1939 to 1942, Mya Sein served as a representative member of the Burmese-Chinese Peace and as chairwoman of the Yangon Education Board. From 1950 to 1960, Mya Sein was a lecturer of history and political science at Rangoon University. After her retirement, she became a visiting professor of Burmese history and culture at Columbia University in New York City, United States of America.

As a prolific writer, Mya Sein penned many articles on Burma in international publications, notably penning the "Administration of Burma" in 1938, "Burma" in 1944 and "The Future of Burma" also in 1944.

== Books ==
- Administration of Burma (1938)
- Burma (1944)
- The Future of Burma (1944)

== Personal life ==
Mya Sein was married to ICS U Shwe Baw in 1933 and divorced in 1954, she had one son and one daughter, Mya Baw and Mya Thandar. She died on 10 November 1988 at the age of 84.
