= End Game: Union Multiplayer =

2021 video game

- Developers: Daniel Kong Thar; Thomas; H3llo
- Publishers: Shoot and Support
- Platforms: Android; iOS
- Release: 2021
- Genres: Shooter; Battle royale game
- Mode: Multiplayer

End Game - Union Multiplayer is a multiplayer shooter game developed and published by young Burmese developers to raise funds for overthrowing the military government in Myanmar. The game was inspired by the Spring Revolution and the armed resistance against the military government. In July 2022 End Game reached the top of the chart in the local Play Store. The game is significant as one of the main fundraisers for the country’s armed resistance movement. As of 2022, the game is banned by the junta. End Game became Myanmar's first multiplayer shooter game.

== Political significance ==
The game was developed by two Burmese developers Daniel Kong and Thomas from Shoot and Support, a group of Digital Strike, to raise funds for the overthrowing of the military dictatorship. It overtook Mobile Legends: Bang Bang, which is also enjoyed by the Burmese youths, and reached the top one in the local Play Store. Players can target top generals in the game, including junta leaders Min Aung Hlaing and Soe Win, in addition to frontline soldiers. *On 21 September 2022, the junta declared a ban on the video games that simulate combat against regime forces by the opposition-led People's Defence Force (PDF). The order warned that people who have the game on their mobile phones would be arrested.*

The developers created the game character to honour of Phyo Zeya Thaw, who was unjustly hanged by the State Administration Council. The profits from the game were distributed to the National Unity Government of Myanmar, for the Humanitarian assistance to Victims, Refugees and IDP camps, and a total of over SGD160K donated.

== See also ==
War of Heroes - The PDF Game: Singleplayer mobile game that has a similar Myanmar Civil War setting
