= Thxa Soe =

Thxa Soe သားစိုး
- Born: Soe Moe Aung; 4 November 1980 (age 45); Yangon, Myanmar
- Genre: Burmese hip hop
- Years active: 2000–present

Thxa Soe (Burmese: သားစိုး; born 4 November 1980) is a Burmese hip hop singer and audio engineer. He is best known for blend of traditional Myanmar folk songs with contemporary electronic music.

== Life and career ==
Thxa Soe started doing music when he was in seventh grade and became involved in local underground hip-hop scene after his high school. He formed a group called W.Y.W with friends which was disbanded in 1998. In that year, he and another female hip-hop singer Kwi Kwi joined the Fi Gi-D with another hip-hop musician Barbu, after singer Thiri Swe left the group. In 2000, with the help of singer Alex, the group changed their name to Theory and released their first album.

Thxa Soe studied at the School of Audio Engineering Institute in London in 2001 and started to learn about electro music. After studying for three years, he returned to Myanmar and took a risk by giving his new music to Myanmar music fans.

His first album, Yaw Thama Mhwe, was released in 2006 with the help from Myanmar orchestra musician Sein Hla Ngwe, Sein Bo Syint and a remix expert, Okka Oo Thar. Since this album, Thxa Soe was under the interest of foreign media due to his combination of traditional Myanmar songs with contemporary music. His second album Yaw Chin Yaw, Ma Yaw Chin Nay was released in 2009, and followed by his third album Pha Atu Ma Atu, was released with his youngest brother, Bon Von. The fourth album, A Mway, fifth album Mhwe Loh Ma Wa Loh, and sixth album Yaw Deh Mhwe Deh were released in 2009 and 2010 consecutively. In 2011, he released his album, Ngwe Myin Yin Lin Loke Myi.

After releasing five solo albums and seven group albums, in 2012, he ended his music career, citing music piracy as a major factor in his decision to quit.

In 2014, he restarted his music career with new mix album called Yaw Thama Paung Choke. In 2015, he released all new song album about Myanmar political movement called Arlu, Tharku, Nharbu, Gandu.
