= De La Salle Brothers in Myanmar =

The De La Salle Brothers in Myanmar are part of the Institute of the Brothers of the Christian Schools, the largest congregation of Roman Catholic religious Brothers who are exclusively dedicated to education. The Institute was founded in Reims, France in 1680, with over 75,000 Brothers and lay colleagues who conduct schools as well as educational works in about 80 countries worldwide. It is now under the Lasallian Brothers in the Philippine District.

== Background ==
The De La Salle Brothers, an international congregation, whose chrism is to provide human and Christian education of young people and adults, and in particular for the poor, have been serving Myanmar people for more than 150 years. To take care of boys' education, the three De La Salle Brothers arrived in Mawlamyine, Myanmar in 1858 from Calcutta by the invitation of Bishop Paul Bigandet. After foundation of St. Patrick’s school in Mawlamyine in April 1860, the brothers came to Yangon and set up a school in a humble wooden building near the bishop’s residence which was on Barr Street, which later moved to the corner of Anawrahta Road and Theinbyu Road in 1885 and became famous as St. Paul's High School. The Brothers schools were nationalized on April 1, 1965.

== Former La Salle schools ==
- St. Patrick's High School at Mawlamyine
- St. Paul's High School at Yangon
- St. Anthony School at Yangon
- St. Theresa School at Yangon
- St. Peter School at Mandalay
- St. Albert School at Maymyo St.Albert
- St. Joseph School at LoiKaw
- St. Columban School Myitkyina
- De La Salle Twente

== Sector of Myanmar ==
Up until the 1999's, the Brothers in the Myanmar was a delegation. The delegation of Myanmar joined the Philippine District and became sub-district of Philippines.

La Salle Brothers mark 150 years in Myanmar Bishop Justin Saw Min Thide and priests of Hpa-an diocese celebrated a special Mass On Nov 13, 2010 at St. Mary’s Cathedral, Yangon, to mark the 150th year of the arrival of the first De La Salle Brothers to Myanmar. The congregation of Christian Brothers arrived in 1860 and started several boys’ school. Its mission was to respond to the needs of young people neglected by society and provide a Christian education which would enrich their minds, touch their hearts and transform their lives, said Brother Lawrence Goh, the congregation’s provincial. There are 17 brothers now working for the Church in Myanmar.

At present The sector of Myanmar is under Lasallian East Asia District (LEAD) Established on 15 May 2011, the Lasallian East Asia District (LEAD) is one of the Districts of the Pacific Asia Regional Conference (PARC) of the Brothers of the Christian Schools (De La Salle). LEAD is made up of the following Sectors (countries and territories): Hong Kong (China), Japan, Malaysia, Myanmar, Philippines, Singapore and Thailand. Tracing its roots in Asia since the arrival of the first Brothers in 1852 in Malaysia and Singapore, LEAD currently has 143 Brothers living in 37 communities and ministering to 105 educational institutions together with the Lasallian Family in East Asia.

== See also other LaSallian Website ==
- De La Salle Institute
- LASALLIAN EAST ASIA DISTRICT
- Philippine Lasallian Family Official Website
