= Maung Khaing =

Sitke Maung Khaing ခိုင် KSM

Magistrate of the Provincial Civil Service of Rangoon
- In office c. 1855 – c. 1875
- Preceded by: New office

Governor of Dala
- In office 1853 – c. 1855

Personal details
- Born: c. 1810s (Note: Given that Khaing married Htaw Lay's 2nd daughter Htu a few years after 1832 per (Oung 2007: 24), he was probably born in the 1810s.) Shwegyin, Konbaung Burma
- Died: in or after 1875 (Note: He was still alive in 1875. (Moore 2013: 244): An 1875 inscription on four stones (95 x 75 cm) donated by Htaw Lay’s daughters and Khaing to Naungdawgyi Pagoda installed on the northeast corner of the Shwedagon platform commemorates their gift, including 25 viss, 63 ticals, and 14 annas of gold.) British Burma
- Spouse: Htu
- Children: Ywet
- Parent: Myat Phyu

Maung Khaing (Burmese: မောင်ခိုင်, pronounced [màʊɴ kʰàɪɴ]; also spelled Maung Khine) was the first Magistrate of Yangon (Rangoon) in the early British colonial period of Myanmar (Burma). Khaing's father was Gov. Myat Phyu of Shwegyin, who had defected to the British in 1832, and became Magistrate of North Moulmein (Mawlamyaing). After the Second Anglo-Burmese War, his father-in-law Htaw Lay and Khaing used their influence with the colonial government to stop the occupation forces' pillaging of Buddhist shrines around Yangon, and restored the war damaged Shwedagon Pagoda.

Both Khaing and Htaw Lay were awarded the title of KSM (Kyet-tha-yay-saung Shwe-salwe-ya Min), the highest honor for public service bestowed by the colonial government. The colonial government named two wide streets in downtown Yangon after Khaing and Htaw Lay. The two street names survived the renaming of Yangon streets until 1989. The bus stop "Maung Khaing" is named after Khaing.

== Bibliography ==
- Aung Myoe, Maung (November 2006). The Road to Naypyitaw: Making Sense of the Myanmar Government's Decision to Move its Capital (PDF). Singapore: Asia Research Institute, National University of Singapore.
- Moore, Elizabeth Howard (2013). Pagoda Desecration and Myanmar Archaeology, 1853–86 (PDF). SOAS, University of London.
- Myaing, Wai Wai (2005). A Journey in Time: Family Memoirs (Burma, 1914–1948). iUniverse. p. 210. ISBN 9780595356515.
- Oung, Kin Thida (2007). A Twentieth Century Burmese Matriarch. Lulu. p. 200. ISBN 9780557102297.
- Singer, Noel F. (1995). Old Rangoon: City of the Shwedagon (illustrated ed.). Paul Strachan. p. 214. ISBN 9781870838474.
