= Lim Chin Tsong =

Chinese Marchant

Lim Chin Tsong OBE
- 林振宗
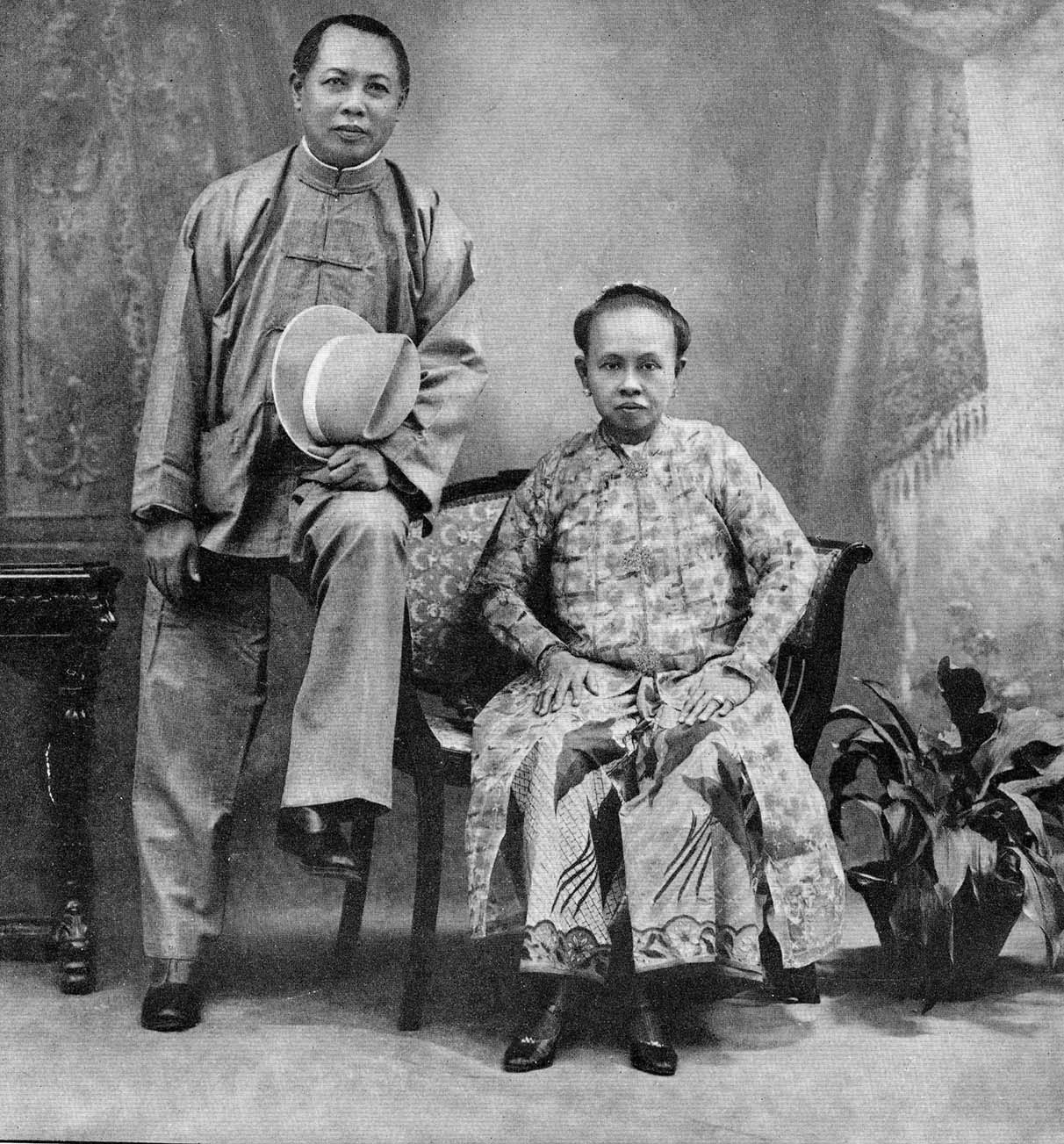
- Lim and his wife, Tan Guat Tean, in 1920
- Born: October 28, 1867; British Burma
- Died: November 2, 1923 (aged 56); Rangoon, British Burma
- Education: Rangoon College
- Occupation: Entrepreneur
- Spouse: Tan Guat Tean
- Children: Eight

Lim Chin Tsong (Chinese: 林振宗; pinyin: Lín Zhènzōng; Pe̍h-ōe-jī: Lîm Chín-chong; Burmese: လင်းချင်းချောင်း; October 28, 1867 – November 2, 1923) was a Burmese Chinese tycoon and merchant, with business interests ranging from rice to oil. Throughout his career, he served as the sole partner of Lim Soo Hean & Company, originally established by his father, a Chinese emigre to Burma.

During his own lifetime he was known as the most successful Chinese merchant in Rangoon. He entertained the social elite of the city in lavish parties hosted at his residence, Chin Tsong Palace, and gave generously to charities, including a hospital, a temple, and several schools. In modern Yangon, he is mostly remembered for the sudden and mysterious circumstances of his bankruptcy and death.

== Life ==
=== Background ===
Lim was born on October 28, 1867, to Lim Soo Hean (林仕興), a Chinese man of Hokkien origin who migrated from Xiamen to Burma in 1861, shortly after the family arrived in Burma from China. After arriving from China, his father apprenticed for a Chinese milling firm before beginning his own business, originally importing goods from China and the Straits Settlements. He later established a rice trading firm, "Lim Soo Hean" (林仕興商行). In 1886, Lim's father also began marketing oil, with Lim working as his assistant.

Lim's father, believing that his own poor English ability was hampering his ability to do business, sent Lim to the best English-language schools in Yangon. Lim attended Rangoon College and St. Paul's School (now BEHS No. 6 Botataung). He also spoke Chinese, but was not literate in the language.

=== Career ===
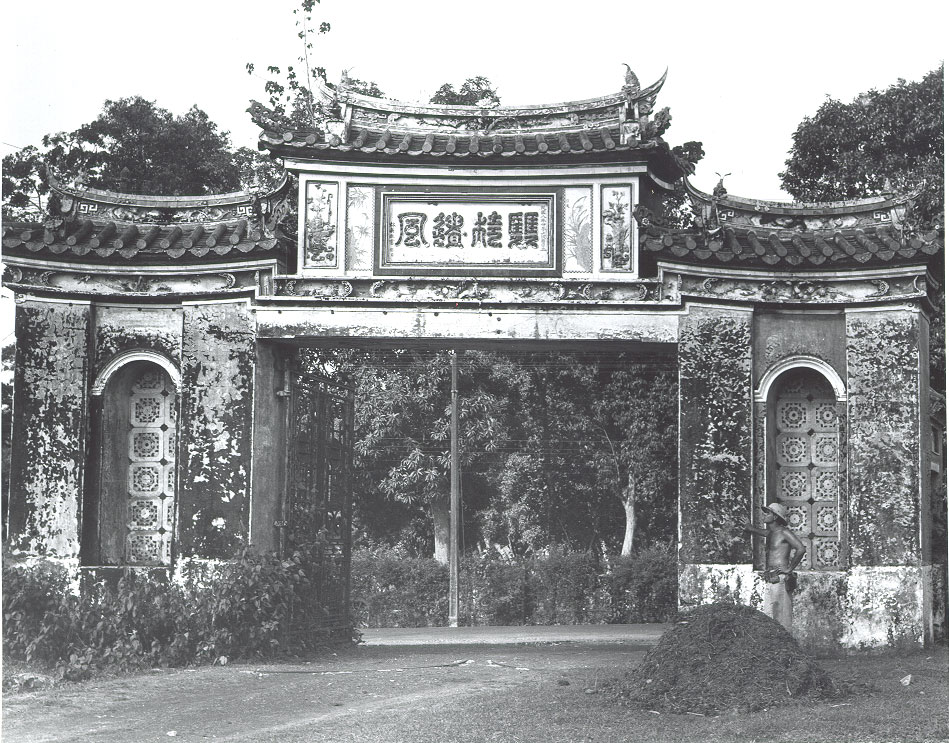
Entrance to the Lim Chin Tsong Palace in 1945.

In 1888 Lim's father died. Lim took over his father's company and expanded from the rice trade to petroleum. In 1891, he became the exclusive local agent of the Burmah Oil Company, handling the internal distribution of oil throughout Burma. After acquiring a fleet of steamships he also began exporting oil to Penang, Singapore, Hong Kong, Shantou and Xiamen. Lim played a prominent role in negotiating the oil company's rights to extract oil from properties in Upper Burma, and was rewarded with a small commission from every barrel produced from those wells.

Lim diversified his business interests into rubber plantations, cotton gins, peanut mills, and into earth metal extraction, including tin, copper, lead, wolfram and gold. Besides exporting oil, his steamships carried passengers, especially labourers from Fujian. Lim owned a match factory whose matches were favored by the viceroy of India, Lord Chelmsford.

During the early 1900s, in which Lin was one of the most prominent merchants in Rangoon, he donated generously to schools and hospitals. Before 1910 a biographer noted that he led the local the Chinese community to contribute generously to the upkeep of a maternity hospital. In 1897 he donated the resources of his steamship company to have materials for Rangoon's Guanyin temple shipped from China. In 1905, Lim and his partners established Anglo-Chinese Boys' and Girls' Schools in Rangoon (中華義學). In 1907, Lim founded the Lim Chin Tsong School (林振宗中西學校). Lim's schools employed teachers hired from England, and the quality of education was good enough that some families from Hong Kong and Macau sent their children to be educated there. One of the goals of Lim's schools, by teaching Chinese students in English, was to increase the competitiveness of Chinese businessmen and professionals abroad.

Lim Chin Tsong maintained good relations with the social and economic elite of colonial Burma. He was made an honorary magistrate, sat on the Rangoon Municipal Committee, and served as a member of the Legislative Council of Burma. In 1919, he was awarded the Order of the British Empire for his fundraising efforts during World War I. The funds raised by Lim included his donation of a steamship, which entered service as the HMAT A49 Seang Choon' and Seang Bee. The ship transported a regiment of Australian light horse to the battlefields of WWI in 1916. It was later sunk by a torpedo off the coast of Ireland on July 10, 1917. Lim owned the Rangoon Turf Club, a racing stable.

=== Decline and fall ===
Lim's financial fortunes declined drastically following WWI. He had been in heavy debt since at least 1911, and by 1914 all of his properties and businesses were mortgaged. In 1915 he won a civil suit over the cancellation of a steam ship charter, but he used the money to import a Rolls-Royce Silver Ghost from England. In 1919 his lack of ability to repay what he owed to the Burmah Oil Company led the company to cease employing him as an agent. He also lost enough money through gambling and by making bad loans for his business associates to criticize him for it. Later in 1919, Lim took his family, relatives, and friends on a five-month vacation to England, where they lived and spent lavishly. Lim hoped that the value of the freight he carried back from England would be sufficient to clear his debts, but his hopes were not fulfilled.

Lim attempted to corner the local rice market in 1921. His resulting monopoly led to a sharp increase in the price of rice, which led the British government to ban the exportation of rice outside of India (which Burma was then a part of). Because of this ban, the rice market in Burma collapsed. By 1922 he was on the verge of bankruptcy. By 1923 he was evading arrest, never appearing in public while refusing to answer the door or answer phone calls. There was an application to the High Court of Burma asking that he be judged insolvent, the proceedings of which Lim did not attend. The court agreed to temporarily halt the trial and to renew efforts to arrest Lim, when he died suddenly on November 2, 1923.

Lim died in his sleep, possibly of a heart attack. At the time of his death he had been suffering from influenza and fever. Before his death he had been notified that the telephone company had threatened to cut his phone service due to non-payment of fees, and his resulting distress may have contributed to his death. Because of the timing of his death, some people speculated that he had committed suicide. His estate was declared insolvent on June 10, 1924, shortly following his death.

== Chin Tsong Palace ==
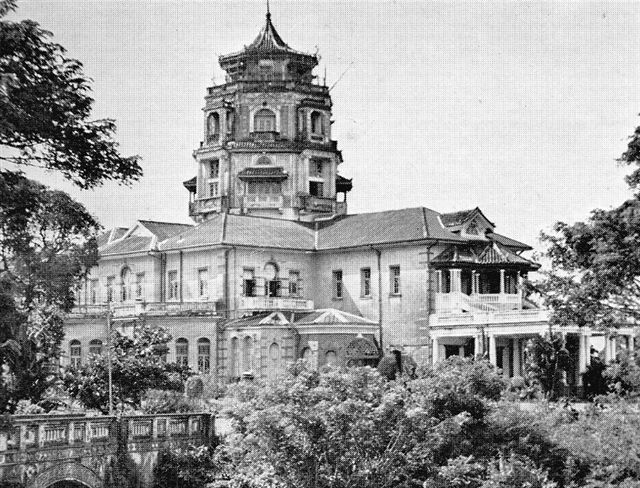
Lim Chin Tsong Palace in 1920

Between 1915 and 1918, Lim built a lavish residence in the Golden Valley area of Rangoon at a cost of over 2,000,000 rupees. The building includes a mixture of Eastern and Western architectural styles, and its five-story tower was built to resemble the Fu Xing Pavilion in the Summer Palace, in Beijing. Building material was imported from both China and Italy, and foreign artists were employed to decorate its interior. The most notable artists to work on the building included the English painters Dod and Ernest Procter. The fusion of Chinese and Western architectural elements was not unusual in other British colonies with strong Chinese communities (such as Penang and Melaka), but was unique in Rangoon.

The original name of the property was "Mount Pleasant", but after it construction the property became popularly known as "Chin Tsong Palace". After the construction of Chin Tsong Palace, Lim and his wife regularly threw lavish parties and entertained the social elite of Rangoon. The most notable guest entertained by Lim at the residence was Georges Clemenceau, who visited Burma in 1920.

During the Japanese occupation of Burma, from 1941 to 1945, the house was the headquarters for a Japanese radio station that broadcast propaganda, the "All Burma Broadcasting Station". Following Japan's defeat the house was owned by an Indian businessman, before being nationalized by the newly independent Burmese government in 1950. After the Burmese government took ownership of the house, they turned it into a guesthouse and changed its official name to "Kanbawza Yeiktha". In the late 1960s the building was converted into a hostel for female students attending the Institute of Economics and the Rangoon Arts and Science University, which were nearby. Today, the house is used as an office and arts school by the Fine Arts Department of Myanmar's Ministry of Culture.

In 2015 the Chin Tsong Palace was designated a heritage site by Myanmar's Ministry of Culture. It is undergoing renovations and remains open to the public. After the renovations, the Ministry of Culture plans to open the space as a cultural center.

In 2020, Curator Marie-Pierre Mol of Intersections Gallery in Singapore had arranged the theme: ‘Art Walk: Time is Yours’, with collaborations between Myanmar- and Singapore-based (and related) artists, including Marc Nair, Pang, Maung Day, Bart Was Not Here and Nann Nann and Nicola Anthony.

== Family ==
Lim was married to Tan Guat Tean (Po U in Burmese). She was illiterate, required an assistant to write and read for her, and signed her name with an "X". The couple had 8 children, including Lim Kar Chang, Lim Kar Hin, Lim Kar Kim, Lim Kar Taik, Lim Kar Tye, and Lim Gaik Kee. His second eldest son, Lim Kar Hin, died on 11 November 1916, preceding his father.

He sent his sons to be educated in England. After Lim's death, many of his children left Burma, and his descendants now live in various Commonwealth countries, including Malaysia, Singapore, the United Kingdom and Canada.

Lim and his family were generally popular during his later life. When his eldest son was married (in the newly completed Chin Tsong Palace), all of the notable European and Eurasian residents of Rangoon attended. The day after the wedding, another wedding party was held in which all of the notable Burmese residents of Rangoon attended. Two days after the initial wedding, another party was held in which the notable Muslim members of the city attended. Finally, three days after the wedding, another party was held in which all of the notable Chinese people in Rangoon attended.

After Lim Chin Tsong's death, Lim Kar Chang, Lim's eldest son, took over the management of his company. Lim Kar Chang attempted to ameliorate his father's debts partially through repossession of property and businesses and partially through applying to have them written off. Despite Lim's efforts, the legal ownership of his properties was still in the process of litigation by at least 1929. Lim's bank, Xie De Yuan (協德園), was acquired by Nam Hwa Bank, a Japanese-owned firm, after it went bankrupt.

In 1938, executives at the Burmah Oil Company discovered that Lim's widow, Tan Guat Tean, though still living in Chin Tsong Palace, was destitute. Reminded of the long association that had existed between Lim and the company in its early years, they arranged for a modest payment to be made to provide for her well-being, which she received in January 1938.

== Legacy ==
During his lifetime Lim was known for kindness and generosity among the Chinese community in Rangoon, and he donated a percentage of his commissions to maintaining schools for Chinese students. Today, Lim is not well known in Myanmar, and those who do know him mostly know that he was very wealthy, but that he died in ignominious circumstances. Among the Sino-Burmese community of Yangon, Lim is remembered as a man whose fall was partially caused by his hubris: in China, an octagonal tower was only constructed by those with claims to imperial authority; by building his home in such a shape, believers in Chinese geomancy claim that he overstepped his place in the world and unwittingly caused his own demise. As a wealthy Chinese man from a colonial era, most modern Burmese people feel they have little connection to Lim.

After Lim's death, many stories circulated orally among the residents of Yangon concerning the sudden circumstances of his financial ruin and death. According to popular lore, Lim ran a counterfeiting operation from a secret chamber under his estate, and the construction of his residence included a network of secret tunnels leading to Inya Lake, which were used to dispose of bodies. In popular legends, his sudden financial ruin is explained as being the result of a betrayal by a foreign wife employed by a police special branch, who uncovered his counterfeiting operation and reported him to the British authorities.

Possibly corroborating these stories, a jockey living on Lim's estate, Thein Pe, claimed to have discovered Lim's counterfeiting operation shortly before his financial difficulties became acute, forcing Thein Pe to quickly pack his belongings and "flee". At the time of Lim's death, there was a foreign woman living on his estate who may have been close to him ("Miss Hannah Boudeville"). She went to court to challenge Lim's creditors' legal right to repossess her home, claiming that Lim had given the house to her as a gift.

== Sources ==
- "Sunday, 27 August 2006". Australian Light Horse Studies Center. Sunday August 27, 2006. Retrieved December 23, 2017.
- "Lim Chin Tsong". The Bull Wheel. BP Archives. 2011. Retrieved December 22, 2017.
- Downing, Jared. "The Lonely Tower of Lim Chin Tsong". Frontier Myanmar. October 11, 2017. Retrieved December 23, 2017.
- Latham, A.J.H. "From Competition to Constraint: The International Rice Trade in the Nineteenth and Twentieth Centuries". Business and Economic History. Series 2, vol. 17. The Business History Conference. 1988. Retrieved December 22, 2017.
- Latham, John, & Heita Kawakatsu. Intra-Asian Trade and the World Market. Routelage. 2012.
- Shaw, J. "Khoo Sain Ban vs Tan Guat Tean on 11 March 1929". Bombay High Court. 1929. Retrieved September 22, 2017.
- "Death". The Straits Times. Lee Kong Chian Reference Library. November 24, 1916. Retrieved 21 September 2013.
- "Late Mr. Lim Chim Tsong, O.B.E." The Straits Times. November 14, 1923. Retrieved September 23, 2013.
- Roberts, Jayde Lin. Mapping Chinese Rangoon. Washington Press. 2016.
- Suryadinata, Leo. Southeast Asian Personalities of Chinese Descent: A Biographical Dictionary. Vol. 2. Institute of Southeast Asian Studies. 2012. ISBN 9789814414135.
- Than, Zaw Win. "New chapter for historic Chin Tsong building". Myanmar Times. January 9, 2015.
- Win, Htay Htay. "Thein Pe of the Rangoon Turf Club: Tracking Days Down Memory Lane". Tea Circle Oxford. April 24, 2017.
- Wright, Arnold. Twentieth Century Impressions of Burma. Lloyd's Greater Britain Publishing. 1910.
- Zaw, Aung. "The House on an Island". The Irrawady. July 14, 2015. Retrieved December 23, 2017.
