= Generation Wave =

Burmese pro-democracy youth movement

Generation Wave (Burmese: မျိုးဆက်သစ်လူငယ်များ အစည်းအရုံး) is a Burmese pro-democracy youth movement founded by Min Yan Naing @ Win Htut, Moe Thwe, hip-hop star Phyo Zeya Thaw, and Aung Zay Phyo. This movement emerged alongside a collection of pro-democracy groups following the 2007 Saffron Revolution and was situated in the broader context of public disenchantment with the National League for Democracy, the most promising pro-democracy group following the 1990 General Election. Thus, the Generation Wave served as a continuation and reinvigoration of the pro-democracy movement in Burma as well as a means to inspire youth engagement in political activism.

== Background and activism ==
Generation Wave was founded on 9 October 2007, following the anti-government protests popularly known as the Saffron Revolution. Generation Wave used graffiti and pamphlets to spread messages opposing the State Peace and Development Council, Burma's military government. Phyo Zeya Thaw reportedly developed one of the group's more widespread campaigns, bumper stickers reading "Change New Government" to apply to cars carrying "CNG" stickers (originally for "compressed natural gas"). The group's logo is a "red stencil of a fist giving the thumbs up". In 2009, Generation Wave members recorded a hip-hop album known as "the black album", which they distributed by leaving unmarked copies in Burmese tea shops. The group also circulated anti-government films, including Rambo, in which the titular character battles Tatmadaw (Burmese military) soldiers in Karen State. The film had been banned by the government for portraying the SPDC and its soldiers in a negative light.

As of 2009, the group was headquartered in the Thai-Burmese border town of Mae Sot; however, its members are required by the group to maintain legal residence in Burma. Membership in the group is restricted to those between 15 and 25 years of age.

With the recent opening and changes in Burma, apparently Generation Wave is now 'above ground' in Rangoon (Yangon), and they recently announced a restructuring and change of name to "Generation Wave Institute." Said director MIn Yan Naing in March 2013: "Our aim is to register as an organisation, because we don’t want to be an illegal organisation – but during the [registration] process I was told to promise that I wouldn’t work with politics. But that is impossible, because all of our work is concerned with politics.”

== Government response ==
As of February 2010, about thirty members of the group had been imprisoned, including Phyo Zeya Thaw, who was arrested at a Yangon restaurant with friends on 12 March 2008. In April, Phyo Zeya Thaw's Acid co-founder and fellow movement member Yan Yan Chan was also arrested, reportedly along with his longtime girlfriend and future wife, Chilli. On 20 November 2008, Phyo Zeya Thaw, Aung Zay Phyo, Arkarbo, Thiha Win Tin, Wai Linn Phyo and Yan Naing Thu were sentenced to five years' imprisonment apiece for breaking State Law and Order Restoration Council Law No. 6/88, "illegal organizing under the Unlawful Association Act". Amnesty International described this statute as "a vaguely worded law whose sweeping provisions can be interpreted as making it illegal to set up any kind of organisation". Yan Yan Chan was released without charges on 7 January 2009.

On 13 January 2012, many imprisoned Generation Wave members were released as part of a mass presidential pardon.
