= Maung Khin =

Burmese judge

Sir Maung Khin, KCIE
- မောင်ခင်
- Born: 1872; Rangoon, British Burma
- Died: 22 September 1924 (aged 51–52); Rangoon, British Burma
- Occupation: Judge
- Known for: The first Burmese man to be knighted by the British monarchy
- Children: Myo Kin and Kin Kin E
- Parent(s): Kya Hnaing and Po Kyaw

Sir Maung Khin KCIE (Burmese: မောင်ခင် [màʊɰ̃ kʰɪ̀ɰ̃]; also spelled Maung Kin, U Khin and U Kin; 1872 – 22 September 1924) was the first Burmese judge of the Chief Court of Lower Burma during the British colonial era, and the first Burmese to be knighted. Maung Khin was known as a good, clean administrator, widely respected by the public.

== Personal history ==
Maung Khin was born to Kya Hnaing and Po Kyaw in Rangoon (Yangon) in 1872, twenty years after the British had captured Lower Burma. Maung Khin studied at Rangoon's elite St. Paul's English High School and Rangoon College, and proceeded to read law in the United Kingdom. After passing the law exam at Middle Temple in 1898, he returned to Yangon and worked as a barrister. In 1921, Maung Khin became first Burmese judge of the Chief Court of Lower Burma. In 1923, he was appointed Minister of Internal Affairs and made a Knight Commander of the Order of the Indian Empire, and became the first Burmese man to receive the title "Sir".

Sir Maung's hobbies were horse riding and gardening. He died on 22 September 1924. He was survived by his wife and their son Myo Kin and daughter Kin Kin E.
