= Chan Chor Khine =

Burmese-Chinese businessman

- Born: 1886; Rangoon, Burma
- Died: April 1934 (aged 47–48); Rangoon, Burma
- Cause of death: Suicide
- Occupations: businessman, land-owner and investor
- Spouse: Margret von Beck

Chan Chor Khine (Chinese: 曾祖慨; Pe̍h-ōe-jī: Chan Chó̍-khài; born in Rangoon, Burma) was a Burmese-Chinese businessman, land-owner, investor and philanthropist.

== Early life ==
Chan Chor Khine was born in 1886. He is the second son of self-made millionaire & philanthropist father Chan Mah Phee (ချန်မဖီ) and Daw Aye Mya (ဒေါ်အေးမြ) daughter of U Aung Ba (ဒေးဒရဲ ကုန်သည် နဲ့ သူကြီး). He attended St Paul's High School, Rangoon before being educated further in China.

== Rangoon ==
Chan Chor Khine returned to Burma to join his father's business Taik Leong. The company dealt primarily in oil, rice and tobacco exports. He ultimately became manager of the company upon his father's retirement. He served as an honorary magistrate on the board of the Corporation of Rangoon.

He was a Council Member of Rangoon University. He donated to build the Rangoon University Gymnasium.

He had two sons from his first marriage. He had three daughters from his second marriage.

== Death ==
Chan committed suicide in April 1934 at 10:20am by shooting himself in the head at his estate, the Brightlands.
