= Acid (hip-hop group) =

Burmese hip hop group

- Origin: Yangon, Myanmar
- Genres: Hip hop
- Years active: 2000–present
- Members: Yan Yan Chan; Annaga
- Past members: Hein Zaw (2000–2006; deceased); Phyo Zeya Thaw (2000–2011)

Acid (often written ACID; Burmese: အက်စစ်, Burmese pronunciation: [ʔɛʔ sɪʔ]) is a Burmese hip hop group often credited with releasing Burma's first hip hop album, Beginning, in 2000. Two of the group's founders were later imprisoned for the group's allegedly pro-democracy lyrics.

== Beginning ==
Acid was founded by Phyo Zeya Thaw (26 March 1981 – 23 July 2022), Annaga (Born 19 May 1979), Hein Zaw (12 June 1981 – 10 April 2006) And Yan Yan Chan (Born 5 December 1979). In 2000, Acid released Burma's first hip-hop album, Beginning. Despite predictions of failure by many in the Burmese music industry, Beginning remained on the number-one position of the Burmese charts for more than two months. A Democratic Voice of Burma reporter described the group's music as blending a "combative, angry style with indigenous poeticism".

The band's repertoire has been said to contain many "thinly veiled attacks" on Burma's military government, the State Peace and Development Council. The Independent stated that while the band "focused on the mundane, their lyrics inevitably touched on the hardships of life in Burma, drawing them into dangerous territory."

== Arrests of Acid members ==
On 12 March 2008, Phyo Zeya Thaw was arrested at a Yangon restaurant with friends on charges relating to his involvement in the youth pro-democracy movement Generation Wave. In April, Yan Yan Chan was also arrested. Although it was widely reported in English pro-democracy papers that he was arrested in relation to democracy activities, the military junta claims that he was actually arrested on drug charges.

Phyo Zeya Thaw was allegedly beaten during his interrogation. On 20 November 2008, he was sentenced to five years' imprisonment for breaking State Law and Order Restoration Council Law No. 6/88, "illegal organizing under the Unlawful Association Act". Amnesty International described this statute as "a vaguely worded law whose sweeping provisions can be interpreted as making it illegal to set up any kind of organization". He was given an additional year's imprisonment for possession of foreign currency, as he had been carrying approximately US$20 in Thai baht, Singapore dollars, and Malaysian ringgit at the time of his arrest. Phyo Zeya Thaw served his sentence at Kawthaung prison. Amnesty International named him a prisoner of conscience and called for his immediate release.

After nearly a year's detention, Yan Yan Chan was released without charges on 7 January 2009. Phyo Zeya Thaw was pardoned and released on 17 May 2011.

In November 2021, Phyo Zeya Thaw was arrested by the Myanmar military junta and charged with planning attacks on junta targets under the Counterterrorism Law and the Public Property Protection Act. Phyo Zeya Thaw was sentenced to death in January 2022, and executed alongside three other democracy activists on 23 July 2022.
