= May Oung =

Burmese jurist and politician

- မေအောင်

Minister of Home Affairs of British Burma
- In office 1924 – 5 June 1926

Minister of High Court of British Burma
- In office 1922–1924

Personal details
- Born: 6 January 1880 Sittwe
- Died: 5 June 1926 (aged 46) Maymyo, Burma, British India
- Spouse: Thein Mya
- Children: Tha Doe Oung; Tun Hla Oung; Mya Sein
- Parent(s): Tha Do Phyu (father); Hnaung Dway (mother)
- Education: University of Cambridge
- Occupation: Legal scholar, Judge, Politician

May Oung (Burmese: မေအောင်, also spelt May Aung; 6 January 1880 - 5 June 1926) was a Burmese legal scholar, judge and politician who served as Minister of Home Affairs during the colonial era. He was known for his expertise in Burmese Buddhist law and one of the founders of the Young Men's Buddhist Association Burma. Scholars view him as a symbol of the early rise of Burmese nationalism. May Oung was the first law professor at Yangon University.

== Early life and education ==
May Oung was born on 6 January 1880 in Sittwe to parents Tha Do Phyu and Hnaung Dway, the second eldest of three sons. The family was of Arakanese descent. His parents died when May Oung was a child, so he was raised by his mother's brother, Hla Aung and his wife, Mya May, who sent him to India for his formative education. He studied law at the University of Cambridge from 1904 and 1907, and pursued an LLM at Cambridge in 1922.

== Career ==
He was one of only two Burmese judges appointed to the High Court when it was established by the British administration in 1922.

From 1924 to 1926, he served as the home member on the Legislative Council, one of the highest positions available to Burmese under British rule. He was also a founding member and president of the Young Men's Buddhist Association and a strong advocate for Buddhist revivalism, believing that Burmese identity was deeply tied to Buddhism and that national unity could be restored through a return to Buddhist teachings.

== Personal life ==
May Oung was married to Thein Mya, and had several children, including Mya Sein.
