= Phyo Zeya Thaw =

Burmese politician and artist (1981–2022)

His Excellency U Phyo Zeya Thaw MP
- ဖြိုးဇေယျာသော်
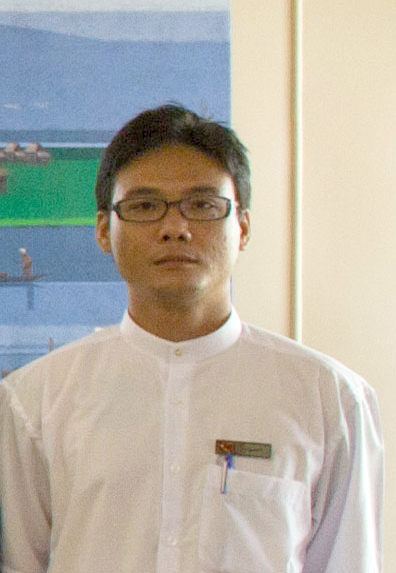
- Phyo Zeya Thaw in 2011

Member of the House of Representatives
- In office 1 February 2016 – 1 February 2021
- Preceded by: Sandar Min
- Constituency: Zabuthiri Township

Member of the House of Representatives
- In office 2 May 2012 – 29 January 2016
- Preceded by: Tin Aung Myint Oo
- Succeeded by: Tun Thit
- Constituency: Pobbathiri Township

Personal details
- Born: 26 March 1981 Yangon, Burma
- Died: 23 July 2022 (aged 41) Insein Prison, Yangon, Myanmar
- Cause of death: Execution by hanging
- Party: National League for Democracy
- Spouse: Thazin Nyunt Aung
- Parent: Mya Thaw (father)
- Education: BEHS No. 6 Botahtaung
- Alma mater: Yadanabon University
- Occupation: Politician, rapper
- Criminal information
- Status: Executed
- Penalty: Death

Phyo Zeya Thaw (Burmese: ဖြိုးဇေယျာသော်; pronounced [pʰjò zèjà θɔ̀]), also referred to as Zeya Thaw (Burmese: ဇေယျာသော်; pronounced [zèjà θɔ̀]; 26 March 1981 – 23 July 2022), was a Burmese politician and hip hop recording artist who was detained and executed due to the perceived anti-junta messages in his lyrics. Amnesty International designated him as a prisoner of conscience. He served as a member of Pyithu Hluttaw, the Lower House of the Burmese parliament. Phyo Zeya Thaw, alongside opposition leader and State Counsellor Aung San Suu Kyi, was elected to the lower house on 1 April 2012.

In November 2021, Phyo Zeya Thaw was arrested by the Myanmar military junta and was sentenced to death in January 2022. In early June 2022, the junta announced that his execution was imminent. On 23 July 2022, Phyo Zeya Thaw and three other pro-democracy activists, including Kyaw Min Yu (Ko Jimmy), were executed.

== Early life and education ==
Phyo Zeya Thaw was born on 26 March 1981 in Yangon, Myanmar to Mya Thaw, a former rector and his wife Khin Win May, a dentist. He attended high school at Basic Education High School No. 6 Botahtaung (BEHS No. 6 Botahtaung). He enrolled at the University of Pharmacy, Mandalay in 1999, then switched to distance education at the Yadanabon University in 2000, and graduated with Bachelor of Arts (B.A), (English) in 2003.

== Hip hop career ==
In 2000, Phyo Zeya Thaw's band Acid released Myanmar's first hip-hop album. Despite predictions of failure by many in the Burmese music industry, the album, Beginning, remained in the number one position of the Burmese charts for more than two months. A Democratic Voice of Burma reporter described his music as blending a "combative, angry style with indigenous poeticism". The band's repertoire has been said to contain many "thinly veiled attacks on the regime". The Independent stated that while the band "focused on the mundane, their lyrics inevitably touched on the hardships of life in Burma, drawing them into dangerous territory."

Phyo Zeya Thaw also became known early on for his social activism. At one concert, he teamed with poets Saw Wai and Aung Way to raise money for a charity for HIV-positive orphans founded by the comedian Zarganar. Along with fellow rapper Nge Nge, he also visited Zarganar's orphanages to help teach English to the children.

== Generation Wave activism and arrest ==
Phyo Zeya Thaw was one of four founding members of Generation Wave, a youth movement opposed to the State Peace and Development Council (SPDP), Myanmar's military rulers. The group was founded on 9 October 2007, following the anti-government protests popularly known as the Saffron Revolution, and used graffiti and pamphlets to spread pro-democracy messages. He reportedly developed one of the group's more widespread campaigns, bumper stickers reading "Change New Government" to apply to cars carrying "CNG" stickers (for "compressed natural gas"). The group also circulated anti-government films, including Rambo, in which the titular character battles Tatmadaw (Myanmar military) soldiers in Karen State. The film had been banned by the government for portraying the SPDC and its soldiers in a negative light.

As of February 2010, about thirty members of the group had been imprisoned, including Phyo Zeya Thaw, who was arrested at a Yangon restaurant with friends on 12 March 2008. In April, Phyo Zeya Thaw's Acid co-founder Yan Yan Chan was also arrested.

== Trial and imprisonment ==
Phyo Zeya Thaw was allegedly beaten during his interrogation. On 20 November 2008, he was sentenced to five years' imprisonment for breaking State Law and Order Restoration Council Law No. 6/88, "illegal organizing under the Unlawful Association Act". Amnesty International described this statute as "a vaguely worded law whose sweeping provisions can be interpreted as making it illegal to set up any kind of organization". He was given an additional year's imprisonment for possession of foreign currency, as he had been carrying approximately $20 USD in Thai baht, Singapore dollars, and Malaysian ringgit at the time of his arrest.

Before his sentencing, he told reporters, "I feel sad, but not because of my imprisonment... I feel sad for the future of our country and people when I think about these facts. These words come from my heart. I wish to say to people, 'Have the courage to reject the things you don't like, and even if you don't dare to openly support the right thing, don't support the wrong thing.' " His sentence was condemned by Amnesty International, which named him a prisoner of conscience and called for his immediate release.

== Release and political career ==
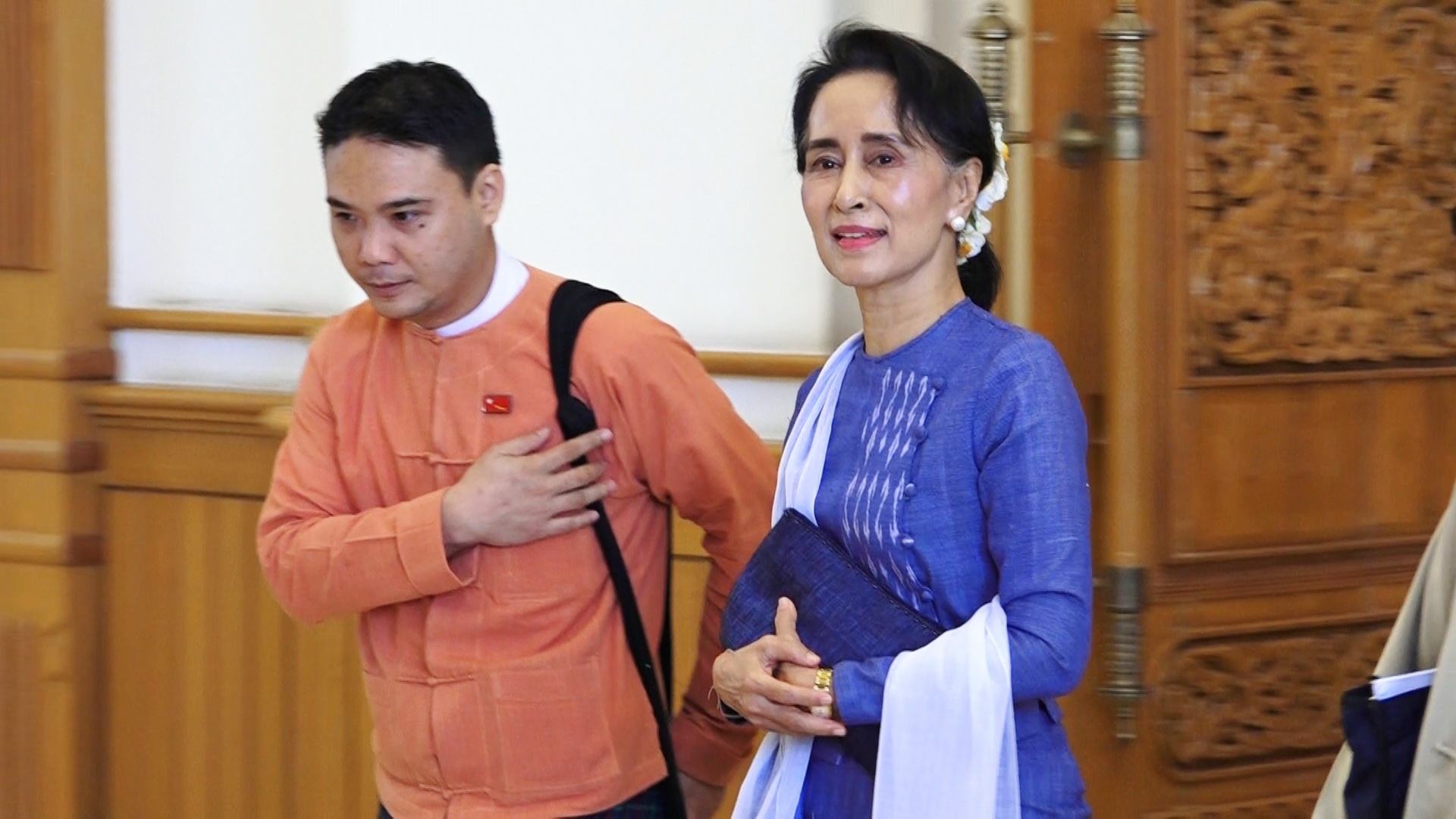
Phyo Zeya Thaw with Aung San Suu Kyi on 11 March 2016

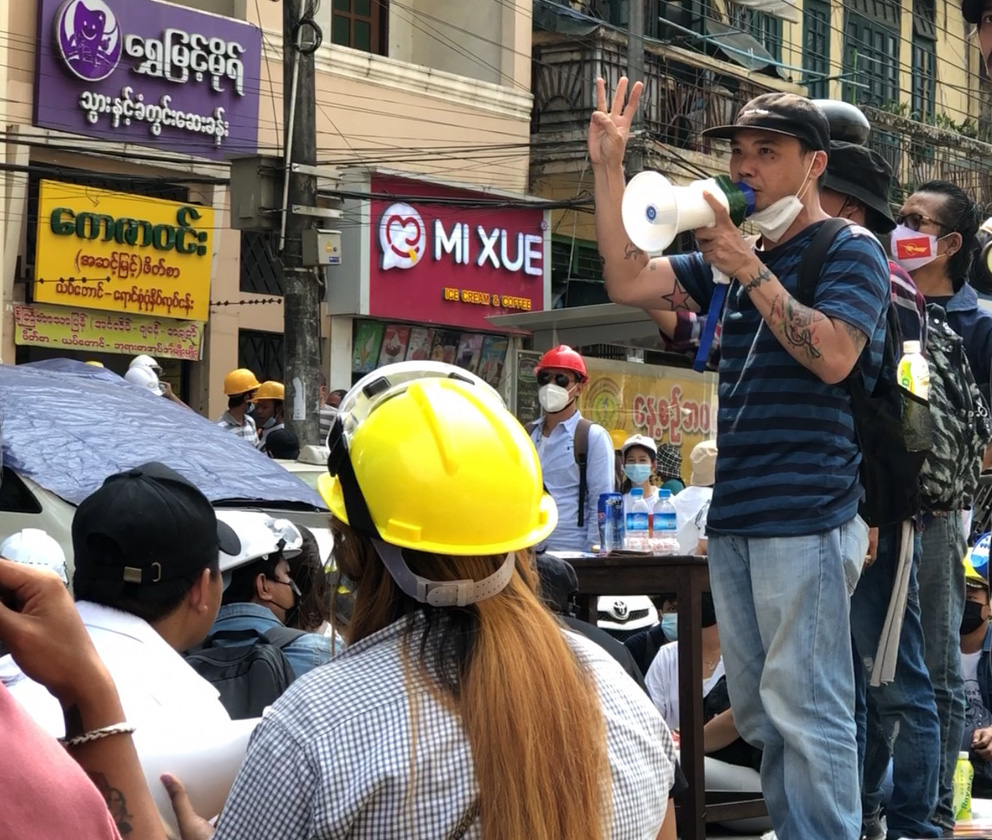
Phyo Zeya Thaw addressing the crowd during 2021 anti-coup d'état protests on 3 March 2021

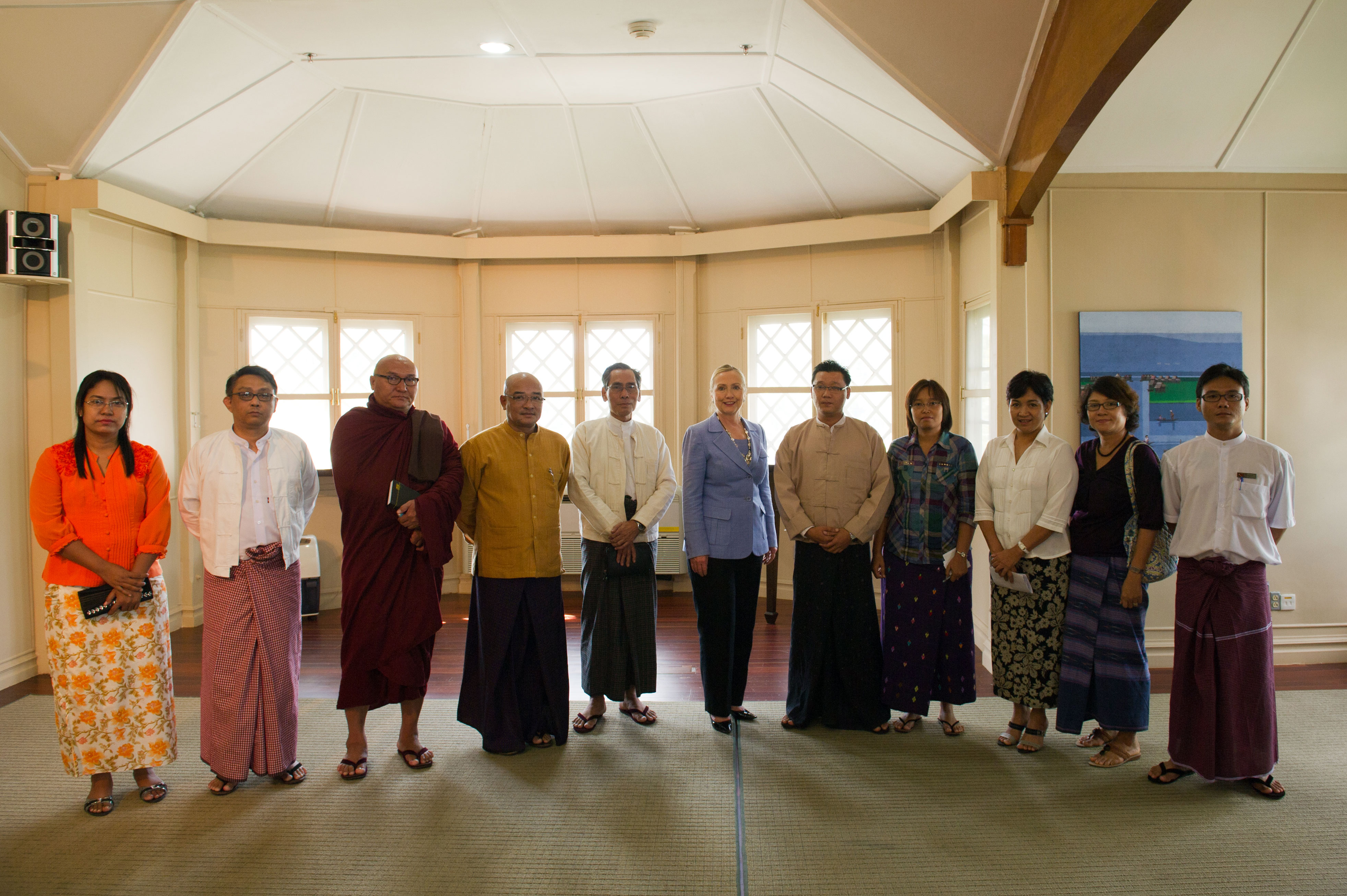
On 2 December 2011, US Secretary of State Hillary Clinton met with civil society representatives, including Phyo Zeya Thaw (far right).

He served out his sentence at Kawthaung prison and was released on 17 May 2011. In August 2011, he was banned by the Mingala Taungnyunt Township Police Station from performing at a stage show on Kandawgyi Lake's Hmyawzin Island.

He was a member of the National League for Democracy (NLD). In the 2012 Myanmar by-elections, he contested the Pobbathiri Township constituency for a seat in the House of Representatives, the country's lower house, and won the seat that Tin Aung Myint Oo vacated in 2011.

In the 2015 Myanmar general election, he contested the Zabuthiri Township constituency and won a House of Representatives seat.

== Execution ==
In November 2021, he was arrested by the Myanmar military junta and charged with planning attacks on junta targets, under the Counterterrorism Law and the Public Property Protection Act. In January 2022, he was sentenced to death. The junta announced that his execution was imminent in June 2022, and on 23 July 2022, it was announced that he had been executed alongside three others, including pro-democracy activist Kyaw Min Yu, also known as Ko Jimmy.

=== Reactions ===
The organizations Human Rights Watch and Amnesty International reacted with shock. The Asia director of Human Rights Watch, Elaine Pearson, spoke of politically motivated trials in Myanmar and pointed out that the families of the condemned had only learned of the executions through media reports.

The German government strongly condemned the first executions in Myanmar in more than three decades. The United Nations Special Rapporteur on the situation of human rights in Myanmar, Tom Andrews, tweeted that he was "shocked" by the news: "U.N. Member States must honor their lives by making this heinous act a turning point in the world's response to this crisis." On 28 July 2022, the G7 foreign ministers of Canada, France, Germany, Italy, Japan, the United Kingdom, and the United States of America, and the European Union released a statement strongly condemning Phyo Zeya Thaw's execution by the military junta.

== Personal life ==
Phyo Zeya Thaw was married to Thazin Nyunt Aung, a fellow rapper.

== In popular culture ==
- In End Game: Union Multiplayer, Multiplayer shooter game from Shoot and Support, the character Zeya Thaw is created to honour Phyo Zeya Thaw as well as serve as a memorial for justice.
