= List of Basic Education High Schools in Myanmar =

This is a list of all Basic Education High Schools, the predominant type of Secondary education in Myanmar.

== Bago Region ==
- BEHS 1 Bago
- BEHS 2 Bago
- BEHS 3 Bago
- BEHS 4 Bago

== Arrawady Region ==
- BEHS 1, Labutta
- BEHS 2, Labutta
- BEHS Myoma, Labutta
- BEHS 3mile Myothit, Labutta

No.9 Basic Education High School, Pathein (Former No.6 Basic Education Middle School)

== Mandalay Region ==
- BEHS 1 Tatkon
- BEHS 2 Mandalay
- BEHS 8 Mandalay
- BEHS 9 Mandalay
- BEHS 14 Mandalay
- BEHS 17 Mandalay
- BEHS 15 Mandalay; It was also known as BTN during colonial days.
- BEHS 16 Mandalay
- BEHS 1 Meiktila

== Mon State ==
- Basic Education High School No. 9 Mawlamyine
- Basic Education High School No. 1 Mudon
- Basic Education High School No. 6 Mawlamyine

Basic Education High School No.1 Muthin Bilin

== Yangon Region ==
Thingangyun Township

- BEHS Thuwana

Ahlon Township

- BEHS 3 Ahlon
- BEHS 4 Ahlon
- BEHS 6 Ahlon

Bahan Township

- BEHS 2 Bahan

Botataung Township

- BEHS 2 Botataung
- BEHS 4 Botataung
- BEHS 6 Botataung

Dagon Township

- BEHS 1 Dagon
- BEHS 2 Dagon
- BEHS 3 Dagon

Insein Township

- BEHS 1 Insein
- BEHS 8 Insein

Kamayut township

- Practising High School Yangon University of Education (TTC Kamayut)
- BEHS 1 Kamayut
- BEHS 2 Kamayut
- BEHS 3 Kamayut
- BEHS 4 Kamayut
- BEHS 5 Kamayut

Lanmadaw Township

- BEHS 1 Lanmadaw
- BEHS 2 Lanmadaw

Latha Township

- BEHS 1 Latha
- BEHS 2 Latha

Pabedan Township

- BEHS 1 Pabedan
- BEHS 2 Pabedan

Sanchaung Township

- BEHS 2 Sanchaung

Shwepyitha Township

- BEHS 1 Shwepyitha
- BEHS 2 Shwepyitha
- BEHS 3 Shwepyitha
- BEHS 4 Shwepyitha

Mingaladon Township

- BEHS 3 Mingaladon
- BEHS 2 Mingalardon

Mayangone Township

- BEHS 1 Mayangone
- BEHS 2 Mayangone
- BEHS 3 Mayangone

Tamwe Township

- BEHS 1 Tamwe
- BEHS 2 Tamwe
- BEHS 3 Tamwe
- BEHS 4 Tamwe
- BEHS 5 Tamwe

Yanking Township

- BEHS 1 Yankin
- BEHS 2 Yankin

== Kayin State ==
- B.E.H.S - Tagondaing

== Thaninntayi Region ==
- B.E. H.S -Myeik
