= BEHS =

BEHS may refer to:

Schools in the United States:

- Bamberg-Ehrhardt High School, Bamberg, South Carolina
- Ben Eielson High School, Eielson AFB, Alaska
- Bishop England High School, Charleston, South Carolina
- Box Elder High School, Brigham City, Utah
- Brookfield East High School, Brookfield, Wisconsin
- Bullitt East High School, Mount Washington, Kentucky
- Burlington-Edison High School, Burlington, Washington

Other:

- Basic Education High School, the designation of a number of schools in Burma; see Education in Myanmar
