= Basic Education High School No. 4 Tamwe =

Public girls' high school in Yangon, Myanmar

- အခြေခံပညာ အထက်တန်းကျောင်း အမှတ် (၄) တာမွေ

Location
- Kyaikkasan Road (opposite No. 154); Tamwe Township, Thingangyun District; Yangon, Yangon Region; Myanmar; 16°48′06.4″N 96°10′23.8″E

Information
- Other name: BEHS No. 4 Tamwe အ.ထ.က (၄) တာမွေ
- School type: Public girls' high school
- Authority: Department of Basic Education, Ministry of Education
- School number: 4
- Gender: Girls only

Basic Education High School No. 4 Tamwe (Burmese: အခြေခံပညာ အထက်တန်းကျောင်း အမှတ် (၄) တာမွေ; abbreviated အ.ထ.က (၄) တာမွေ or BEHS No. 4 Tamwe) is a public girls' high school in Tamwe Township, Yangon, Myanmar.

== Location ==
The school is located on Kyaikkasan Road in Tamwe Township, Yangon, opposite No. 154 Kyaikkasan Street and near United Living Mall. St. Francis of Assisi Catholic Church is located on the same road at 131 Kyaikkasan Road.

== History ==
According to a 2016 report in The Irrawaddy, the school was formerly known as St. Francis School. Across Burma, the government increased its control over education following the 1962 military coup led by General Ne Win. The Private Schools Registration Law was passed in 1963, and private schools, including missionary schools, were nationalised in 1965 and 1966. St. Francis Girls' School subsequently became part of the state education system and was renamed Basic Education High School No. 4 Tamwe.

== School activities ==
The school holds the Myanmar Matriculation Examination for its students. It has also held Myat Saya Pu Zaw Pwe (မြတ်ဆရာပူဇော်ကန်တော့ပွဲ), a teacher-honouring ceremony. Myanmar Alin reported on events at the school in November 2008 and January 2011.

The school has a marching band and pom-pom troupe (ဘင်ခရာနှင့် ပန်းဖွားအဖွဲ့). In October 2026, the group received 1,000,000 kyats from Deputy Minister U Myo Kyaw Thu for its assistance at the opening ceremony of the 2026 Regions and States Billiards and Snooker Competition at the National Sports Competition Hall in Thuwunna.

== Notable alumnae ==
- Mee Mee (Thin Thin Aye; died 2018) was a Burmese pro-democracy activist and political prisoner who was the member of the 88 Generation Students Group. She took part in student activism during 8888 Uprising while in tenth-standard student at BEHS No. 4 Tamwe. In 1989, she was detained for four months at Insein Prison after taking part in an event marking the first anniversary of Phone Maw's death.
- Nwe Yin Win, Burmese pop singer (attended when the school was St. Francis Girls' School)

== See also ==
- Basic Education High School No. 5 Tamwe
- List of Basic Education High Schools in Myanmar
