= Secondary education in Myanmar =

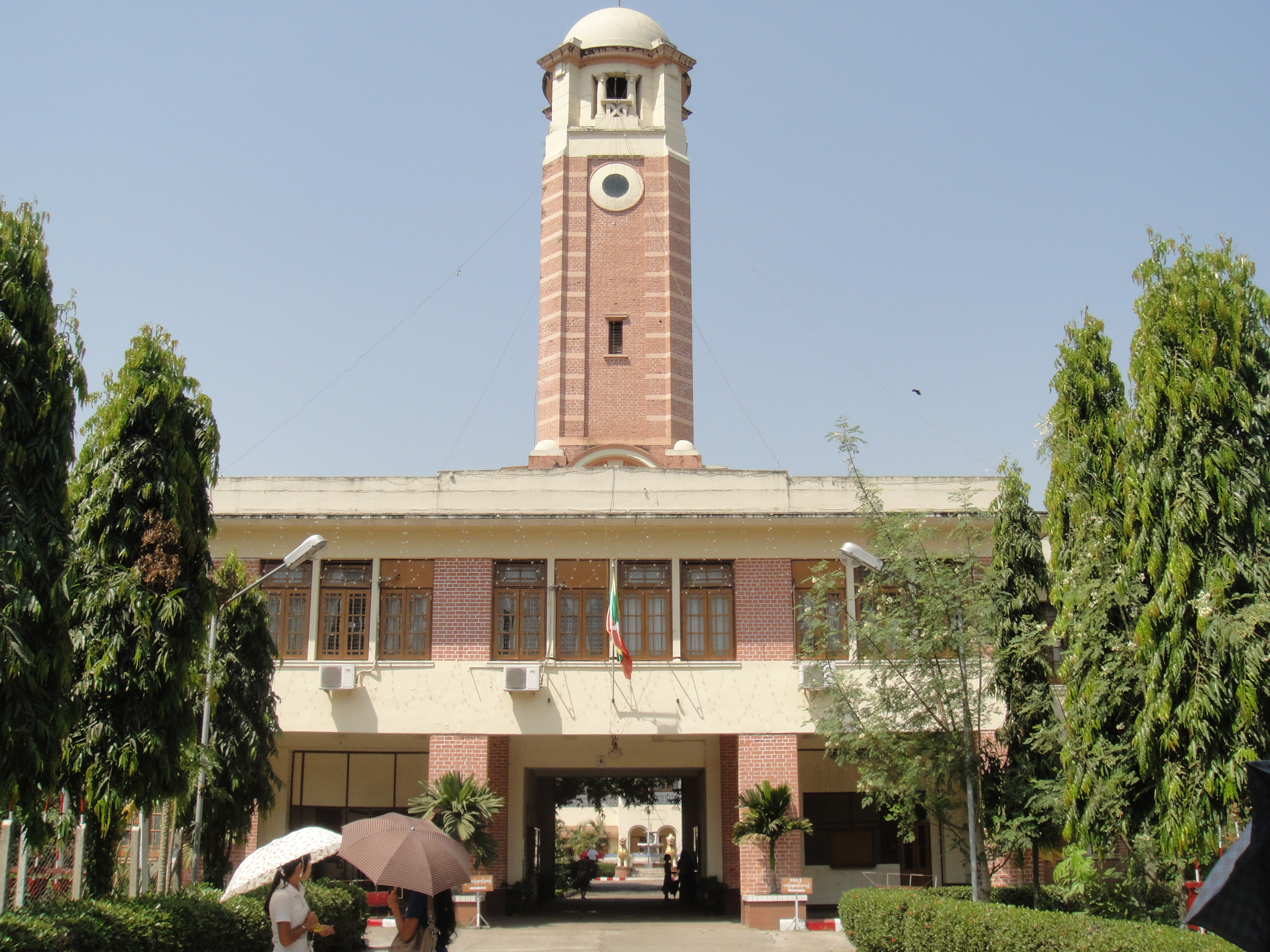
Department of Basic Education No. 3, former Rangoon college (Kyimyindaing Campus)

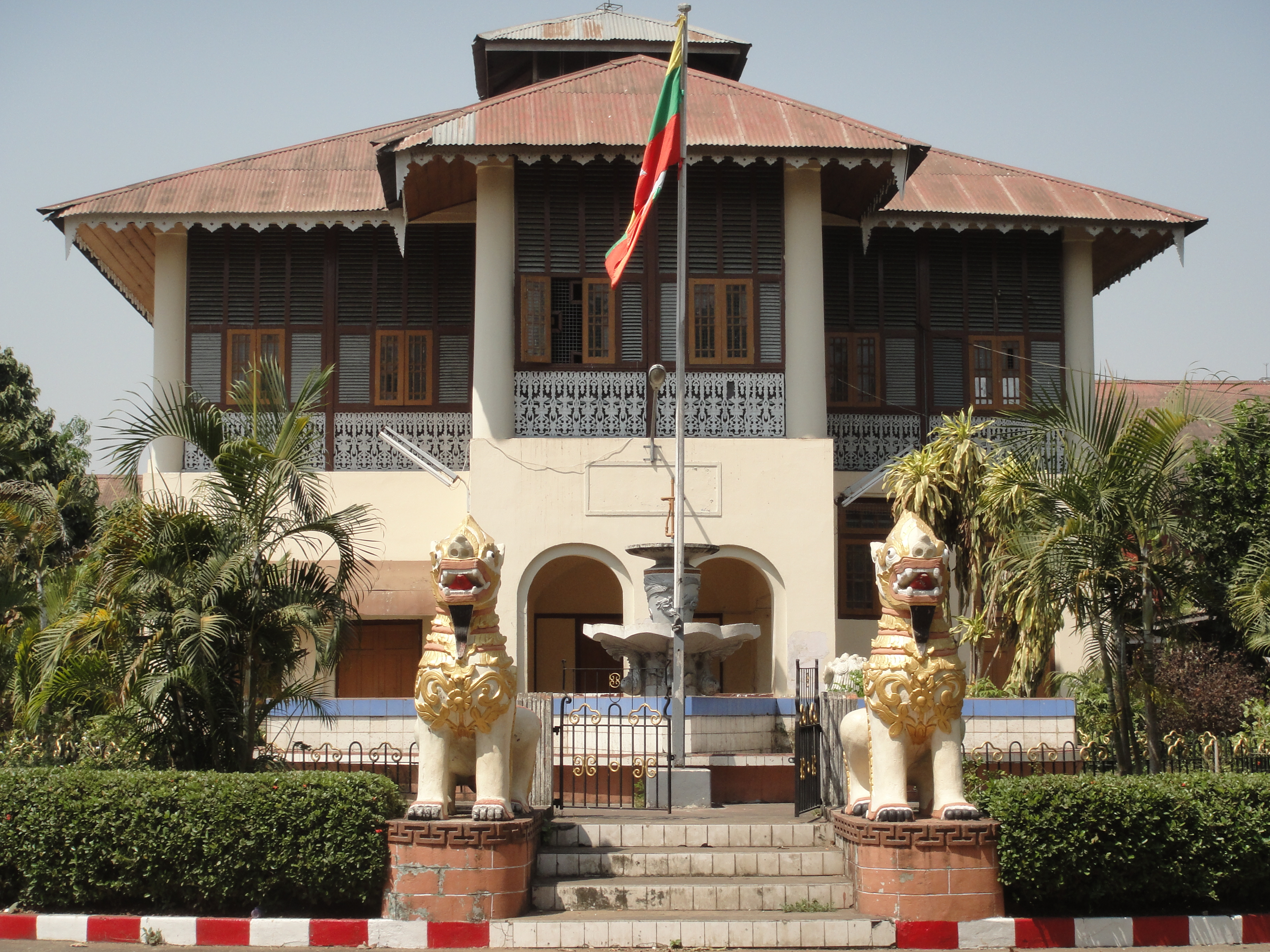
Assembly building of DBE 3

High schools in Myanmar (Burmese: အစိုးရအထက်တန်းကျောင်း) are operated by the Department of Basic Education under the Ministry of Education in Myanmar. The present education system has not changed since the re-opening of the schools in 1989, under the SLORC. After the collapse of socialist regime, the DBE updated the high school education system that most of the study syllabus based on socialism was withdrawn and a new version was introduced. Government high schools are now known as Basic Education High Schools (abbreviated BEHS), not State High Schools (SHS). The 9th Standard is regarded as the year one of the high school or Grade 10, and 10th Standard is the year two of the high school or Grade 11, where matriculation exams are held. At that time, matriculation exams covered both syllabus from the year one and the year two high school courses. Students who pass the matriculation exams are eligible to enter any universities and institutes according to their choices and total exam scores. Most teachers in Burmese schools are underpaid but some teachers seek high earnings from their private tuitions; an estimated 50 to 80% of students take private tuition classes apart from school lectures.

== Uniform ==
Colour code of the high schools' uniform is white top and green bottom, although some girls' uniforms are mixed designed. From basic Primary schools to High schools, the uniform with this colour code is designed for students and teachers.

Primary school student stunt with a special designed uniform in modern day

== Syllabus ==
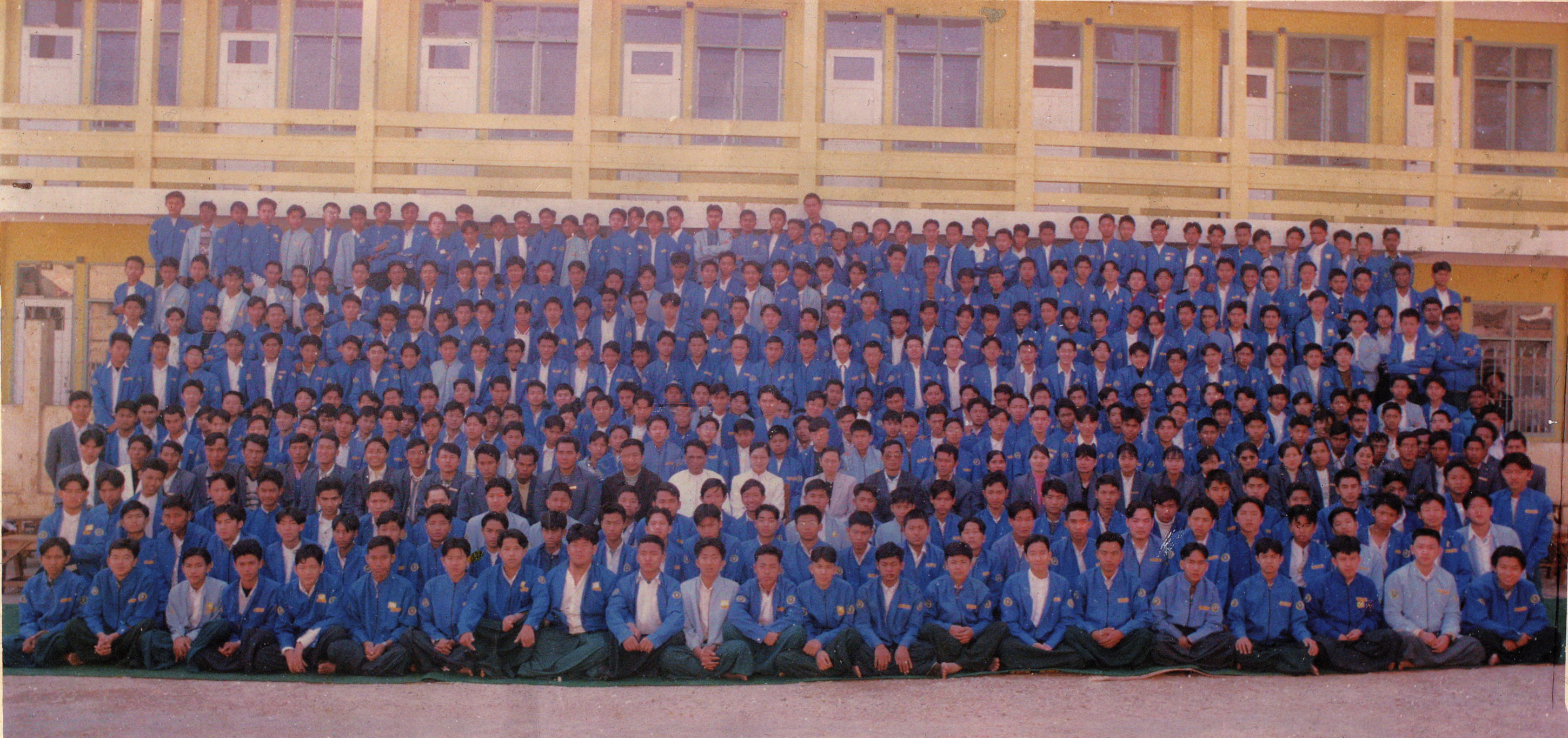
Grade 11 Students in hundreds lined in front of their boarding school in Maymyo

High schools students choose one of 2 tracks upon entering high school: science or arts. Science-specialized students have six major subjects: Myanmar, English, Mathematics, Chemistry, Physics and Biology. Arts-specialized students take six major subjects: Myanmar, English, Mathematics, Geography, History and Economics. The student life in Myanmar is much oppressed non-democratic if compared to the western student cultures. Most boarding schools accept more than 500 students per year. At today's context, boarding schools are quite competitive with each other, even creating some under-table enrolling culture black economy in the education market of Burma.

== Examinations ==
Students in all schools, including government schools, comprehensive schools, and private boarding schools take the University Entrance Examination (တက္ကသိုလ်ဝင်တန်း စာမေးပွဲ), commonly referred to as the matriculation exam in English, administered by the Myanmar Board of Examinations. Students from government high schools and comprehensive schools can register for the examinations internally by the guidelines of school teachers, although students from private boarding schools have to register for the exams externally themselves. Students who attend international English-language schools or other private schools are not eligible to sit for the matriculation exam, nor are they allowed to enroll in Burmese universities.

== Criticism ==
In the meantime, comprehensive schools are developed as only minority rich families can afford to enroll their children. Schools in Yangon such as TTC Yangon, Dagon-1, and Kamayut-2 are among the most well-known fee-paying schools. Students who can afford boarding schools have to pay as high as 5 million kyats a year for an overall care of a student (including accommodation, health care, and food). Poor students from sub-urban districts cannot afford the high education fees, and thus, critics argue Myanmar education system is most unfair. People hope there will be a fairer education system in the future so that parents will no longer need to spend extra cash to send their children to the expensive schools. Currently, a dispute rises in Myanmar education system when the government enacted against school teachers teaching private tuition.

== See also ==
- List of Basic Education High Schools in Myanmar
- Phaungdawoo Monastic Education High School
- TTC Yangon
- Myanmar International School
- Yangon International School

== Gallery ==
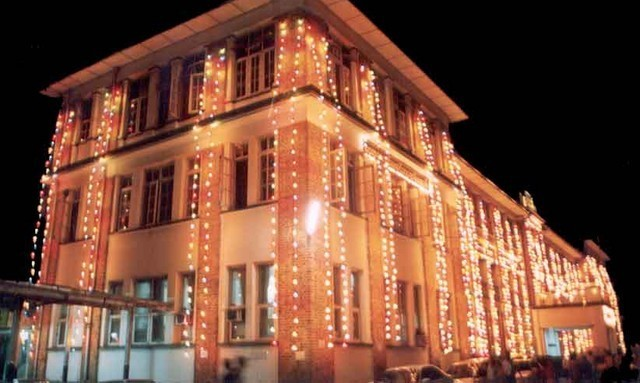
BEHS 1 Dagon

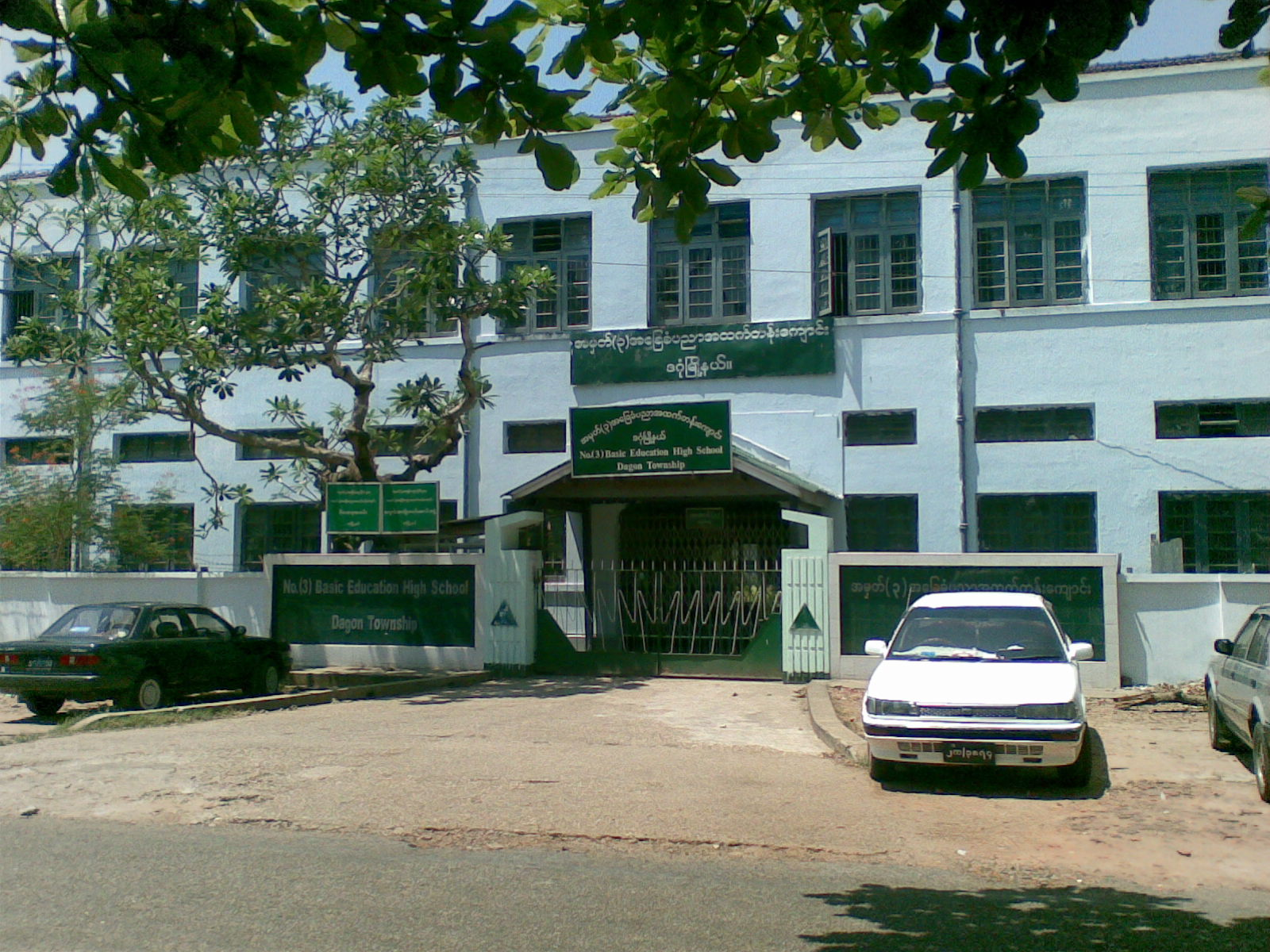
BEHS 3 Dagon

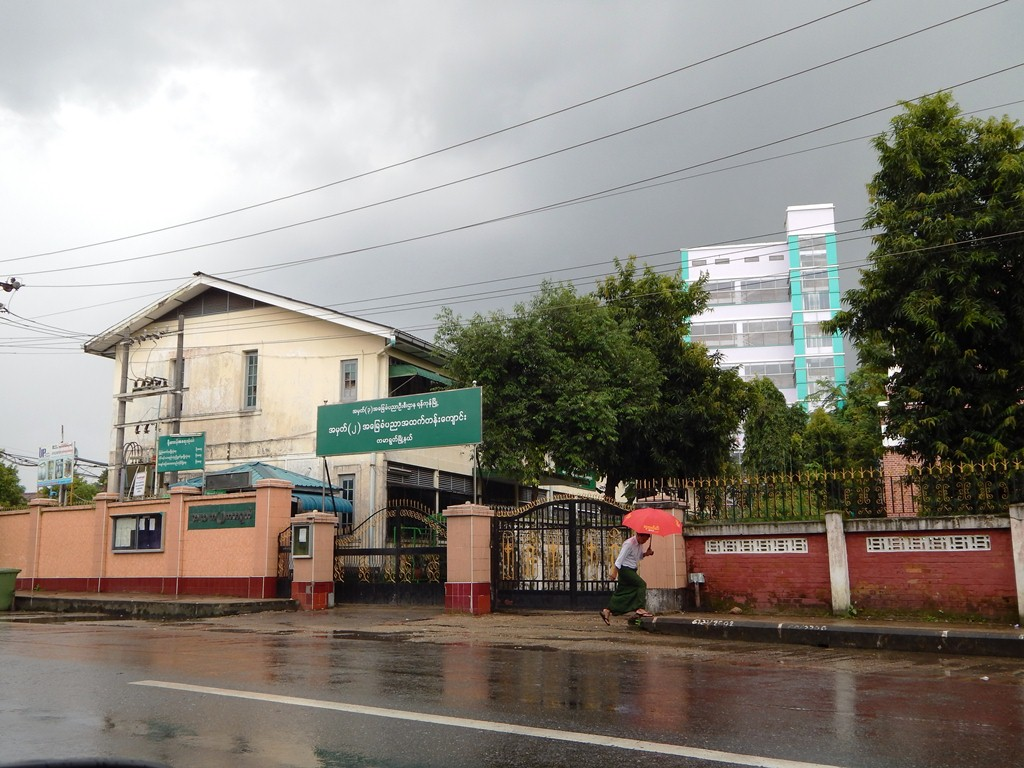
BEHS 2 Kamayut

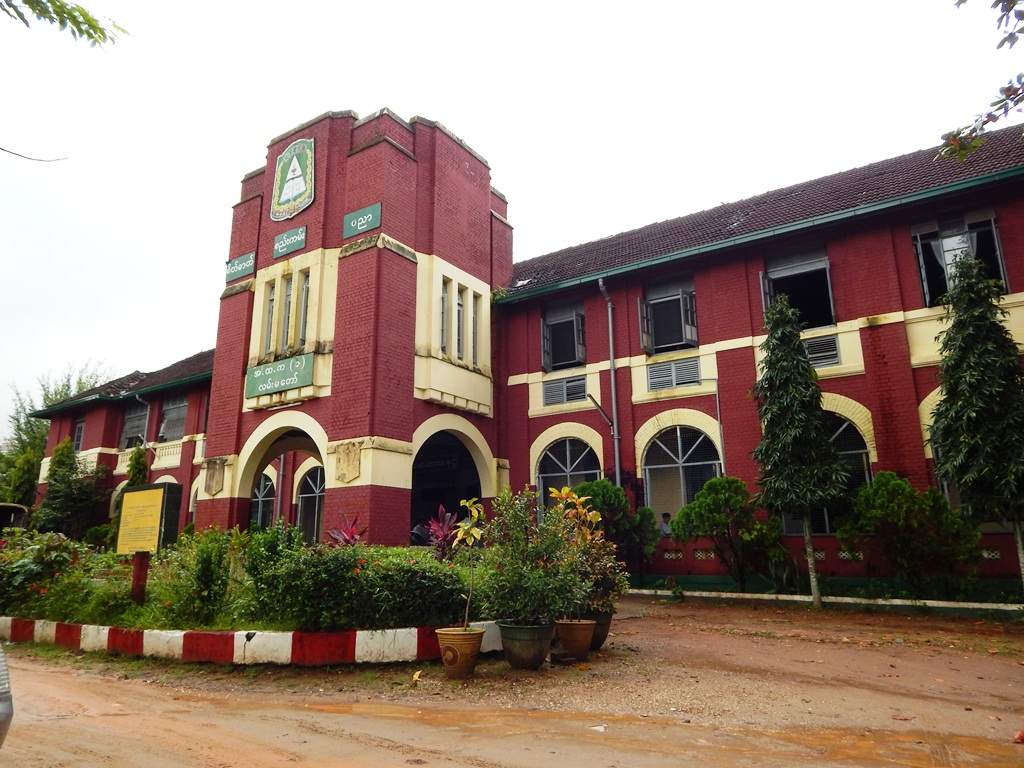
BEHS 1 Lanmadaw

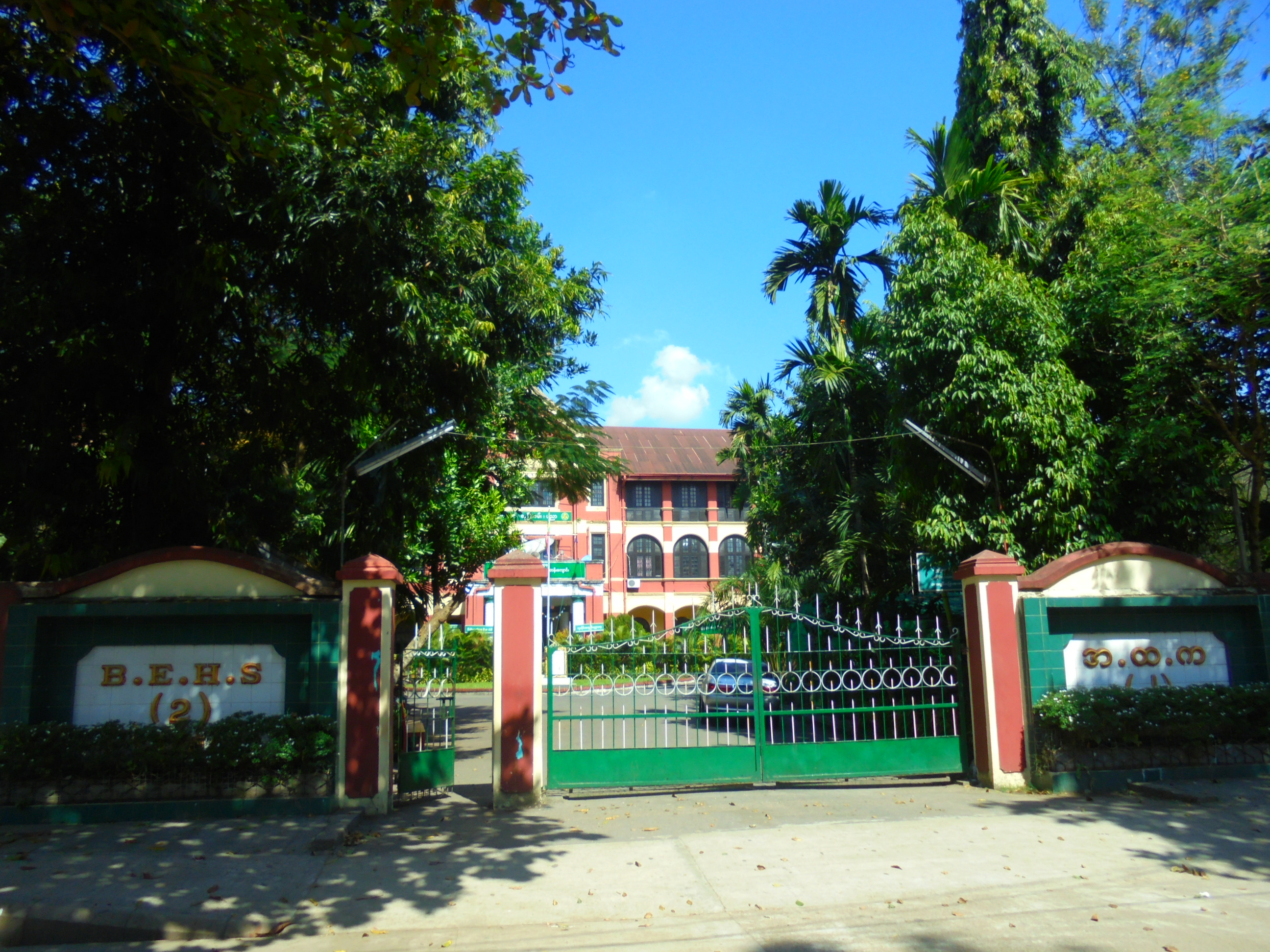
BEHS 2 Latha

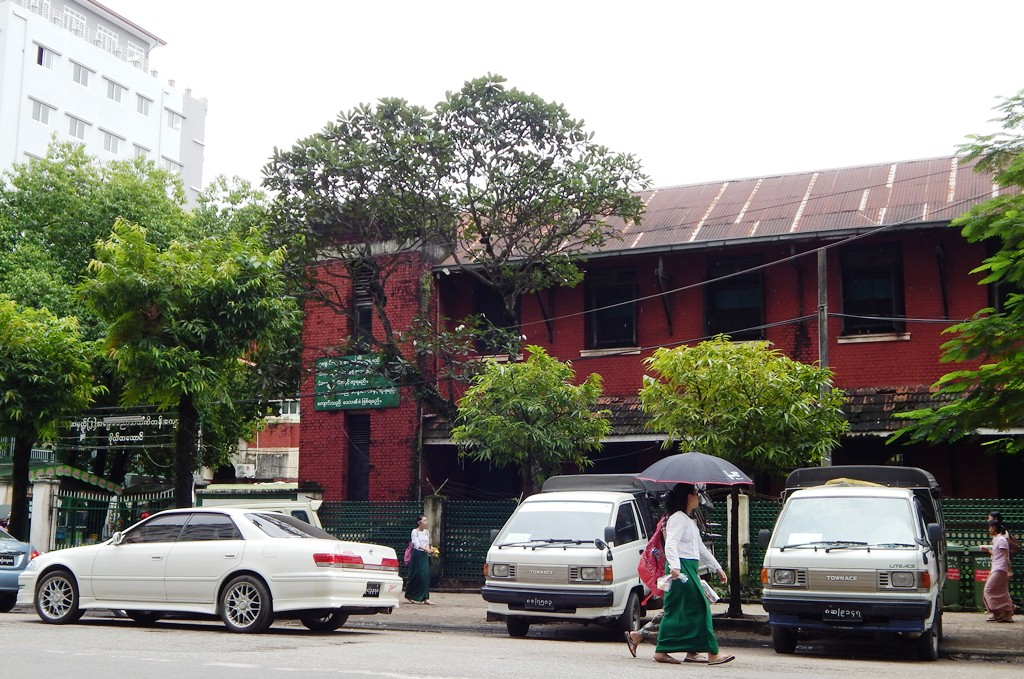
BEHS 2 Botataung

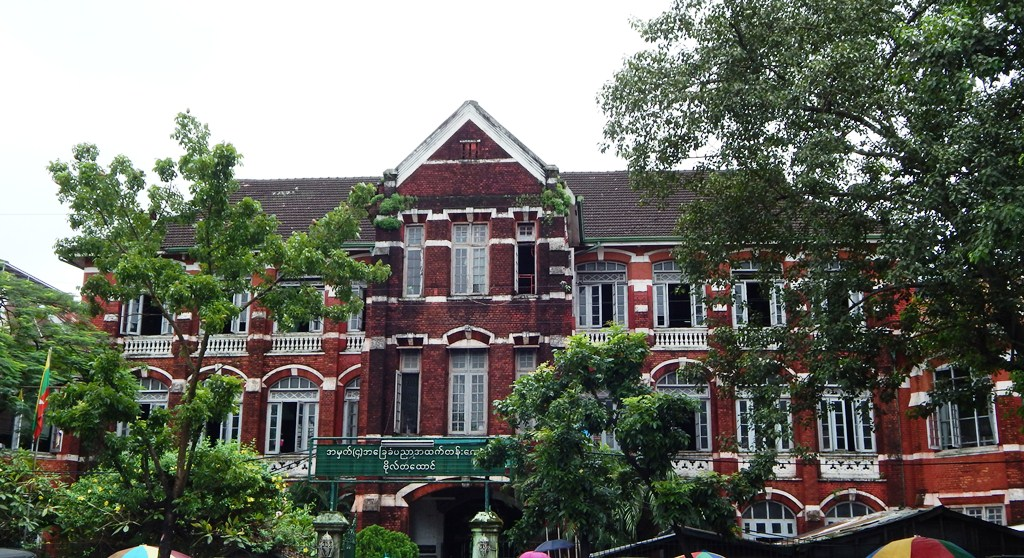
BEHS 4 Botataung

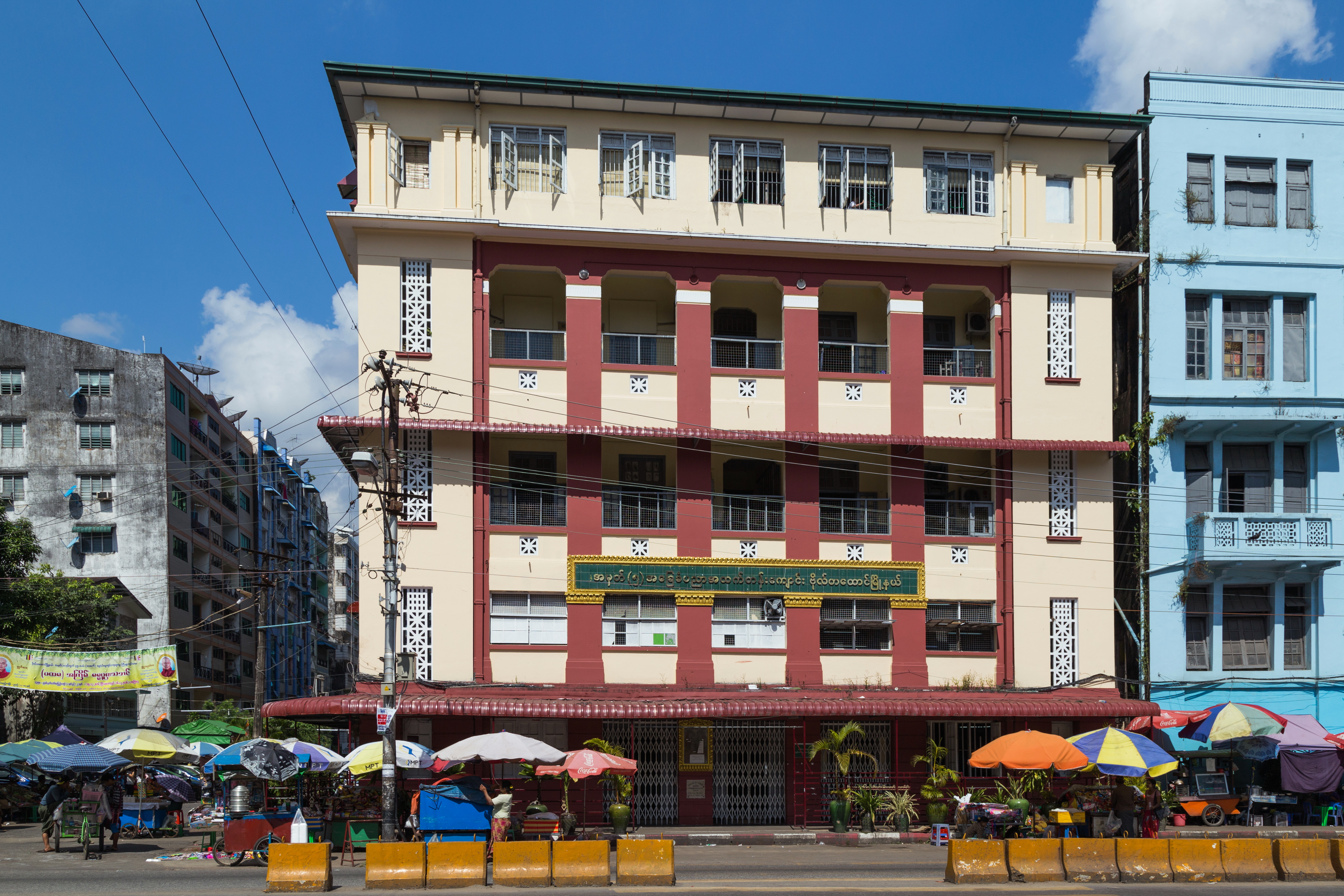
BEHS 5 Botataung

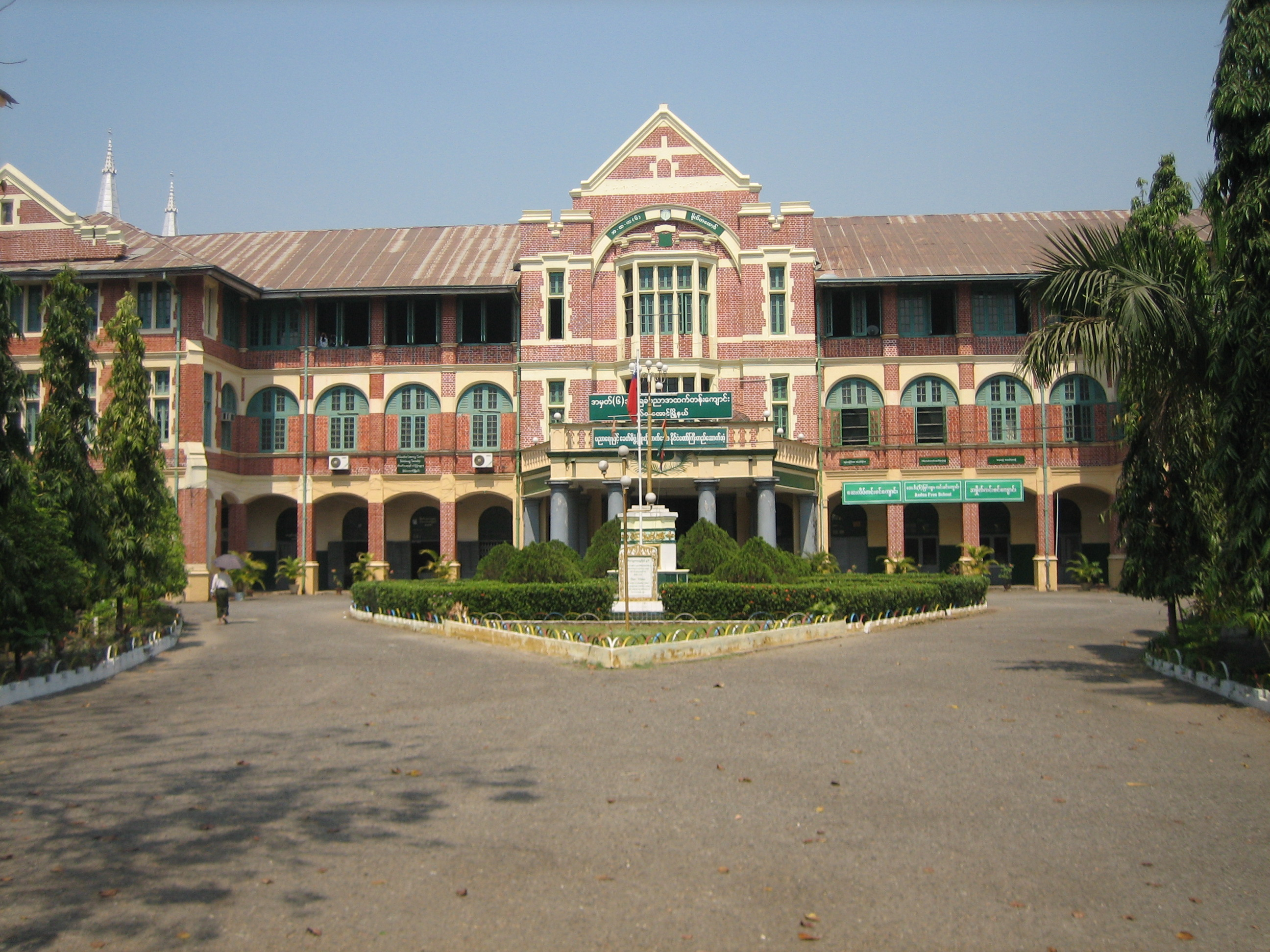
BEHS 6 Botataung

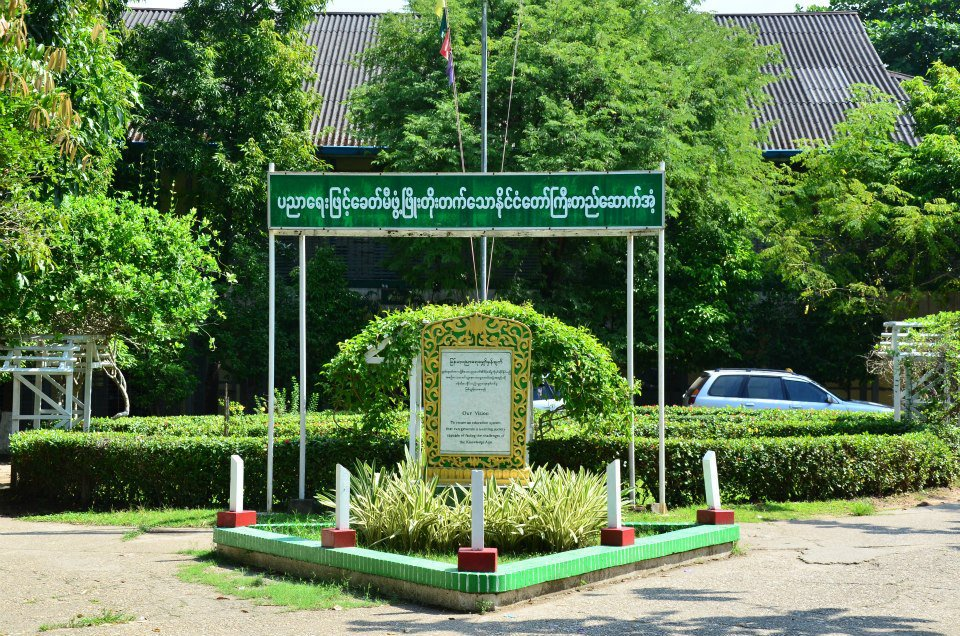
BEHS 2 Bahan

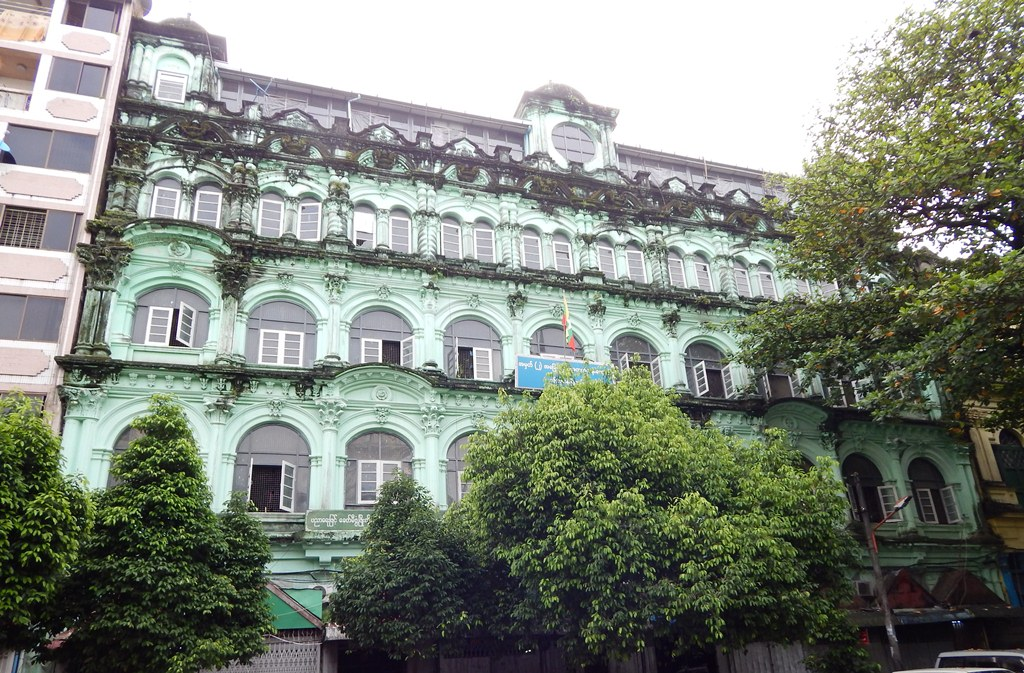
BEHS 2 Pabedan

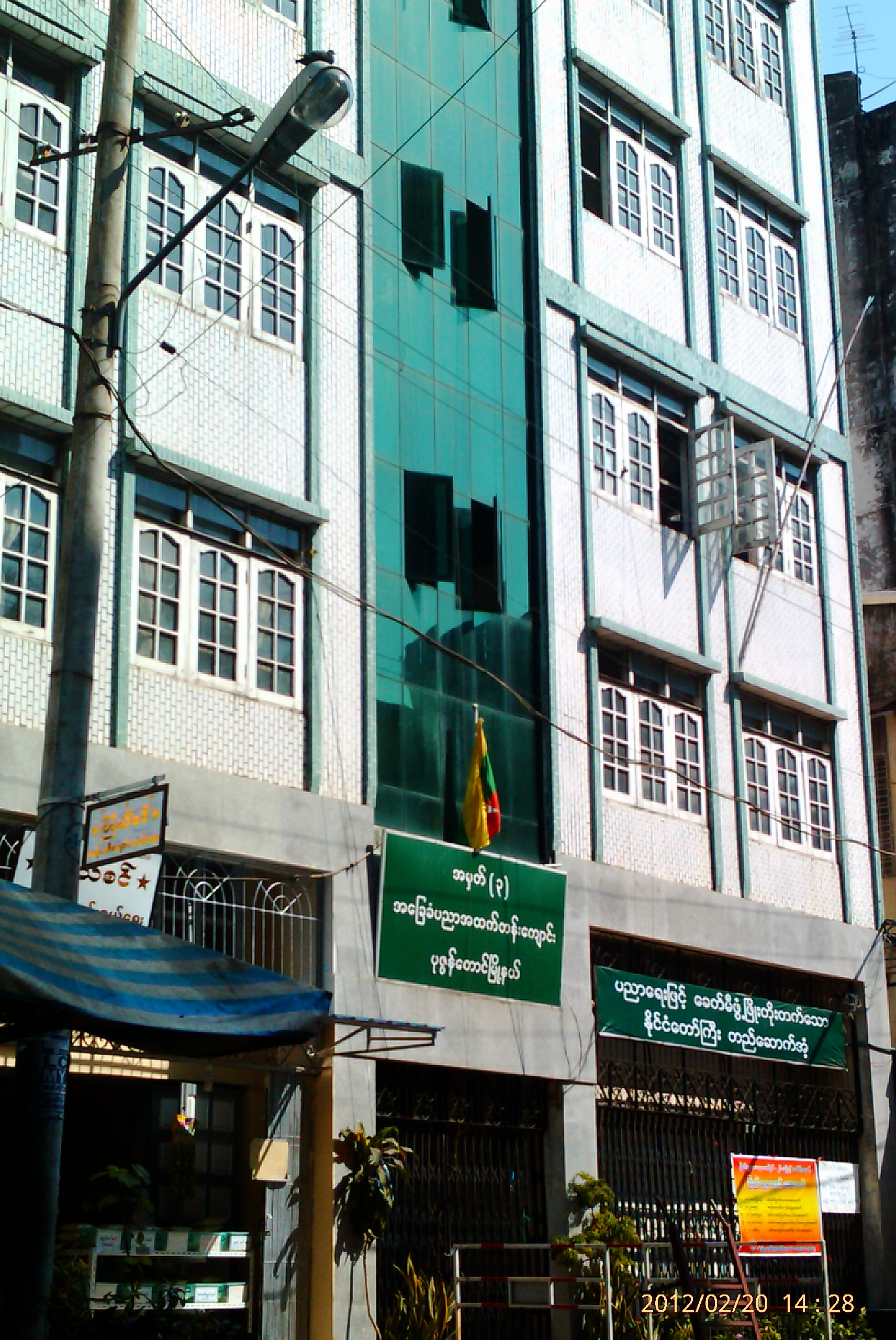
BEHS 3 Pazundaung

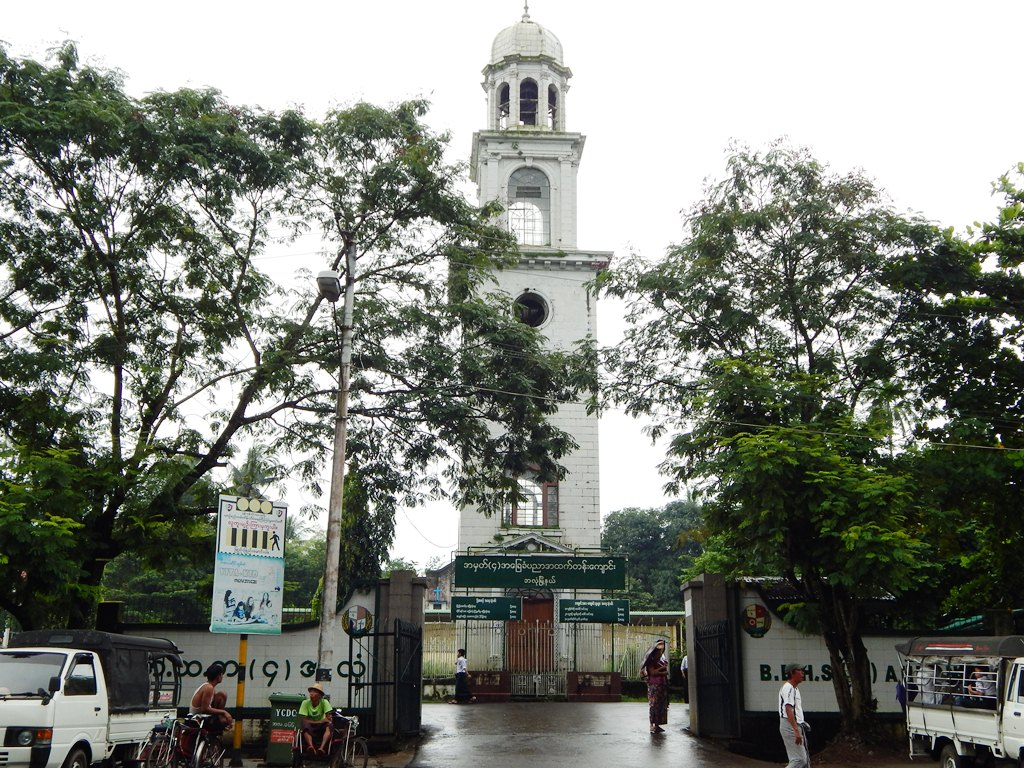
BEHS 4 Ahlon

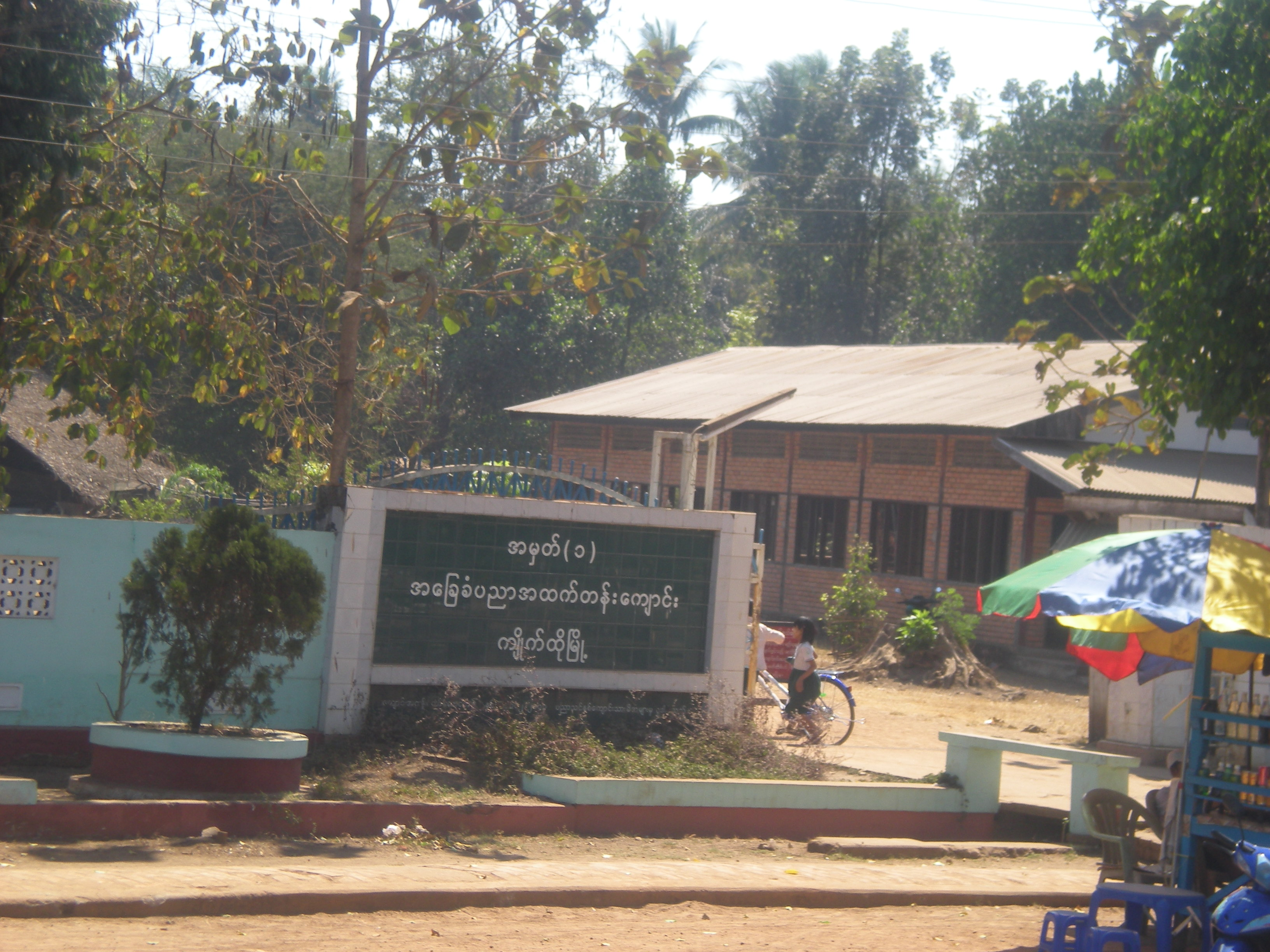
BEHS 1 Kyaikhto

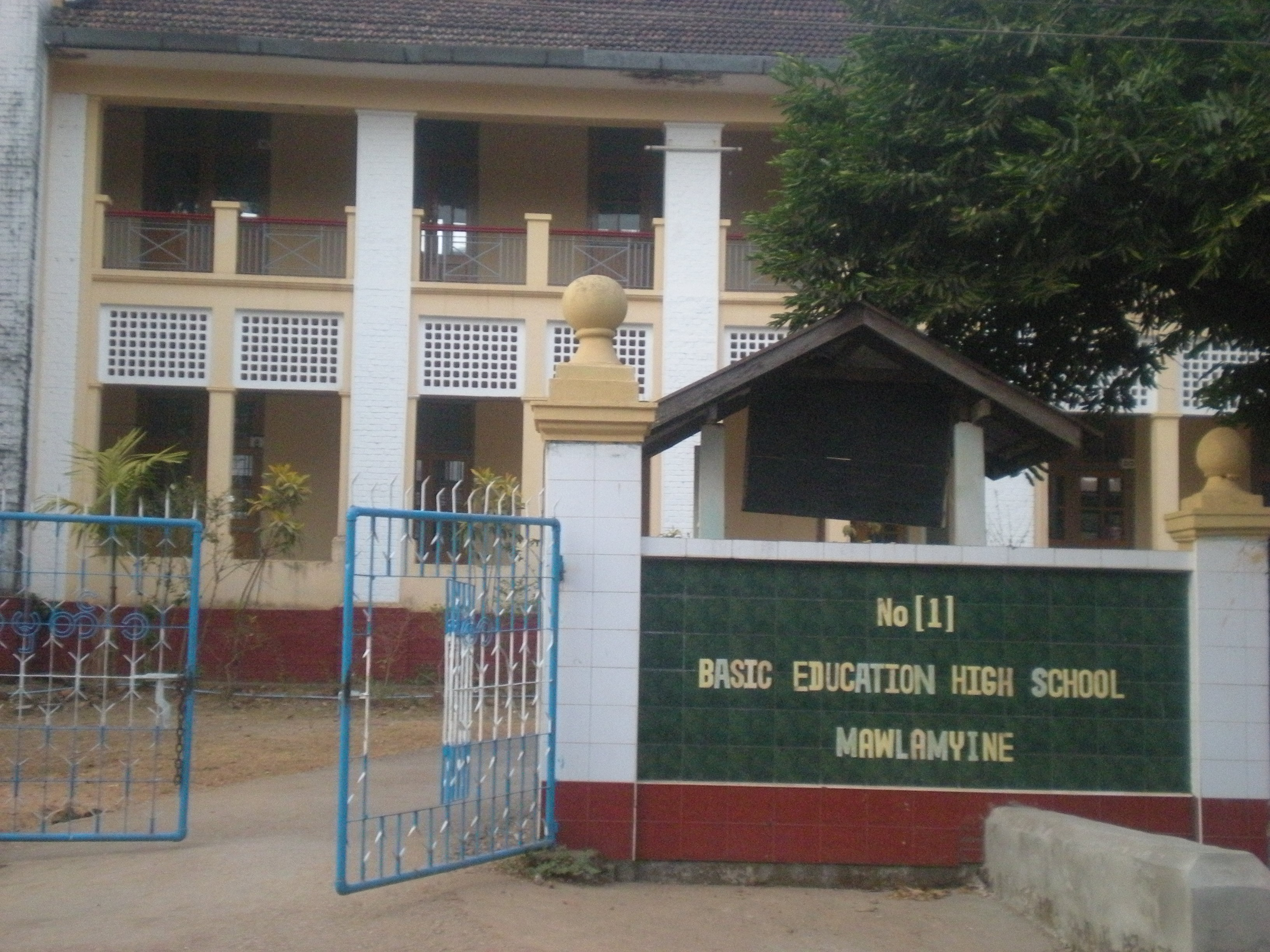
BEHS 1 Mawlamyaing

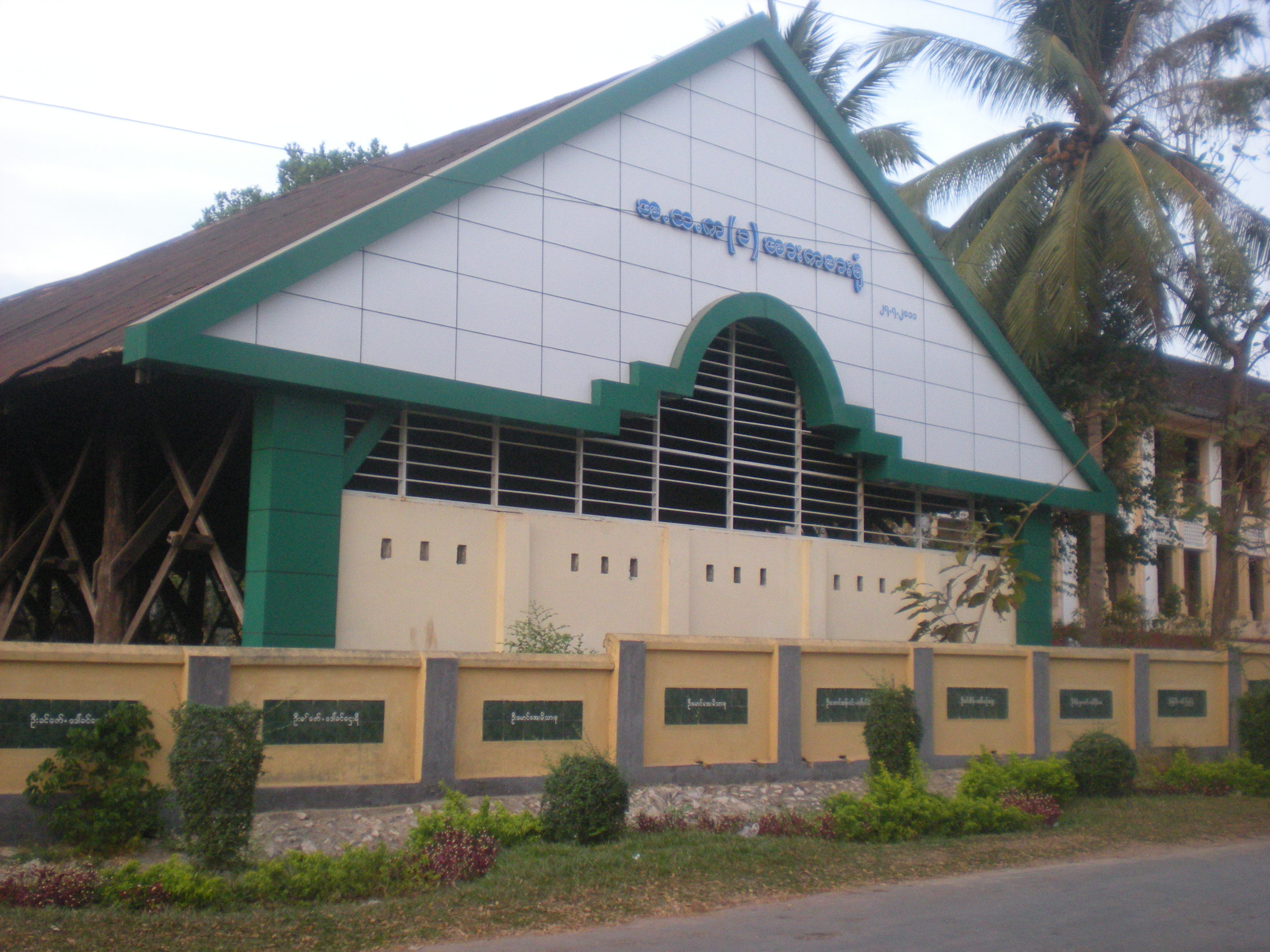
BEHS 1 Mawlamyaing sports hall

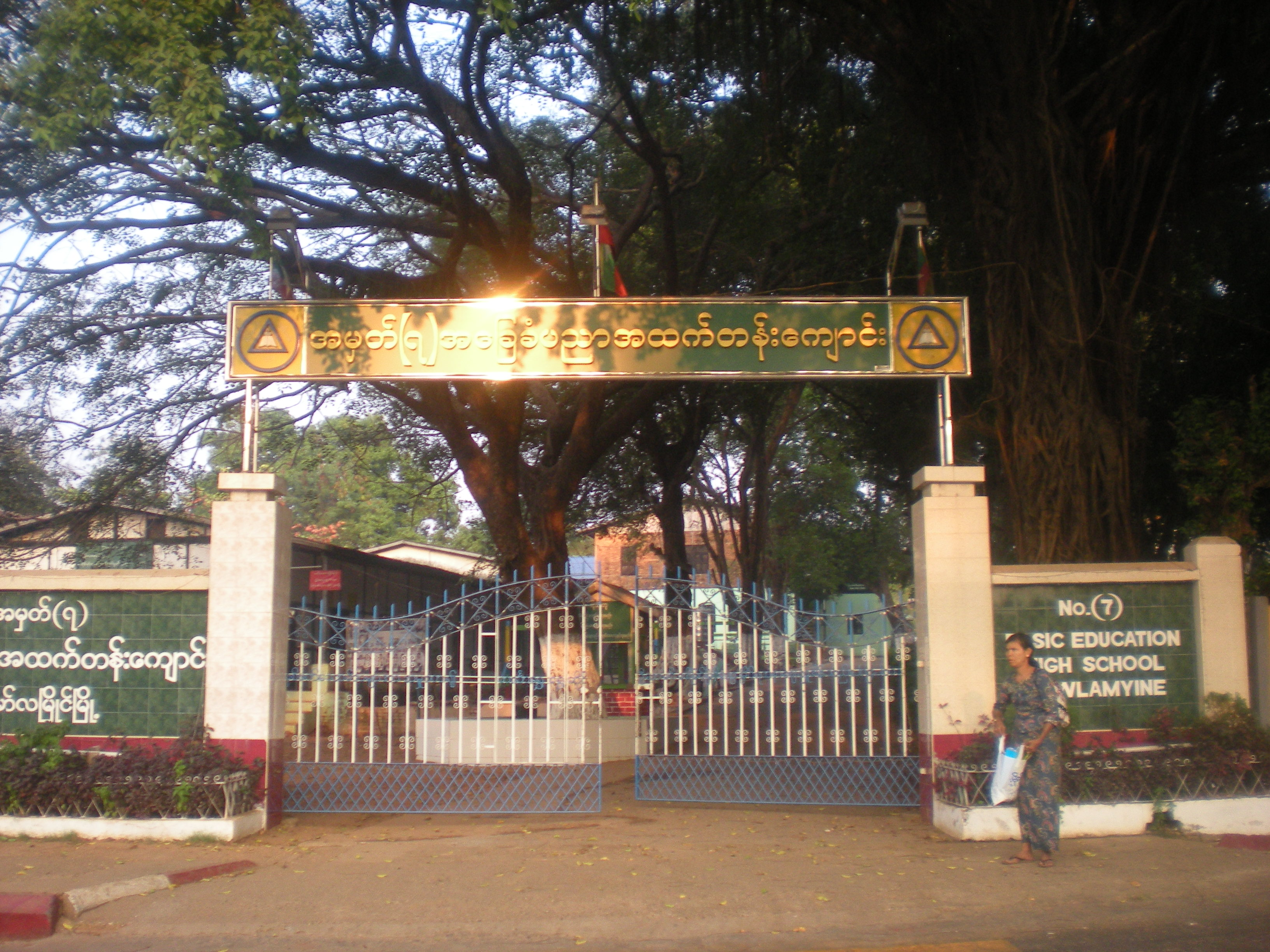
BEHS 7 Mawlamyaing

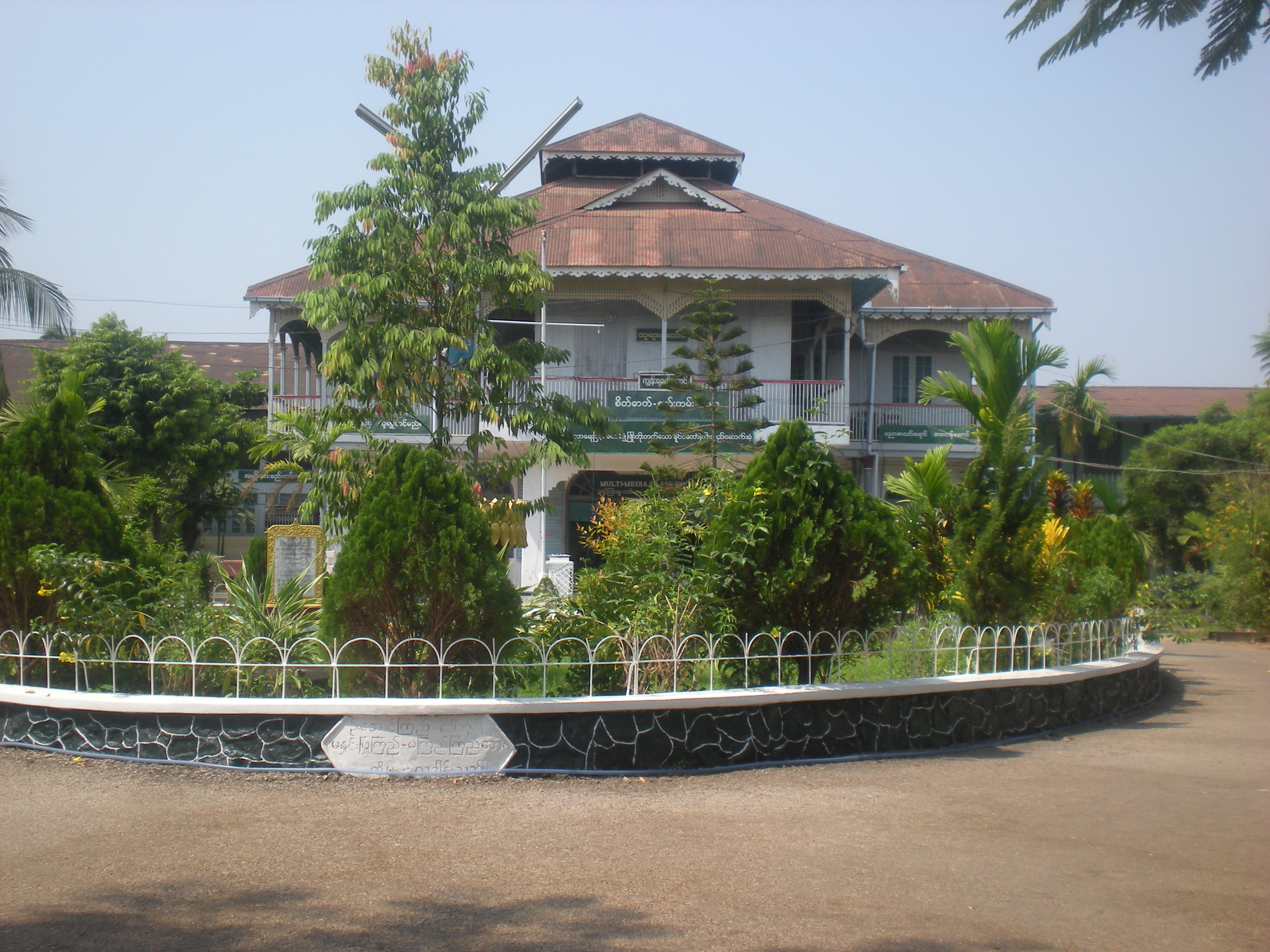
BEHS 8 Mawlamyaing

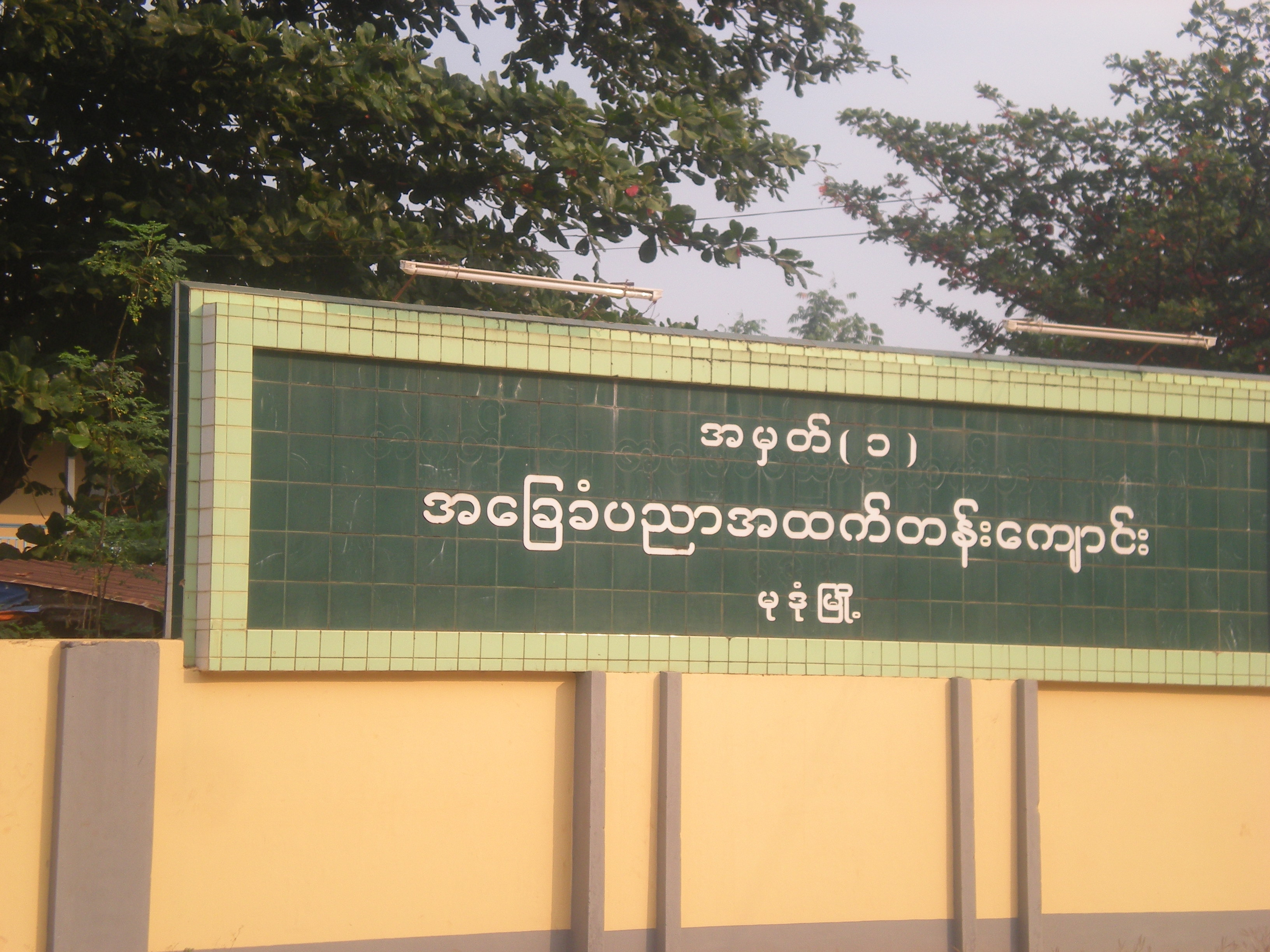
BEHS 1 Mudon

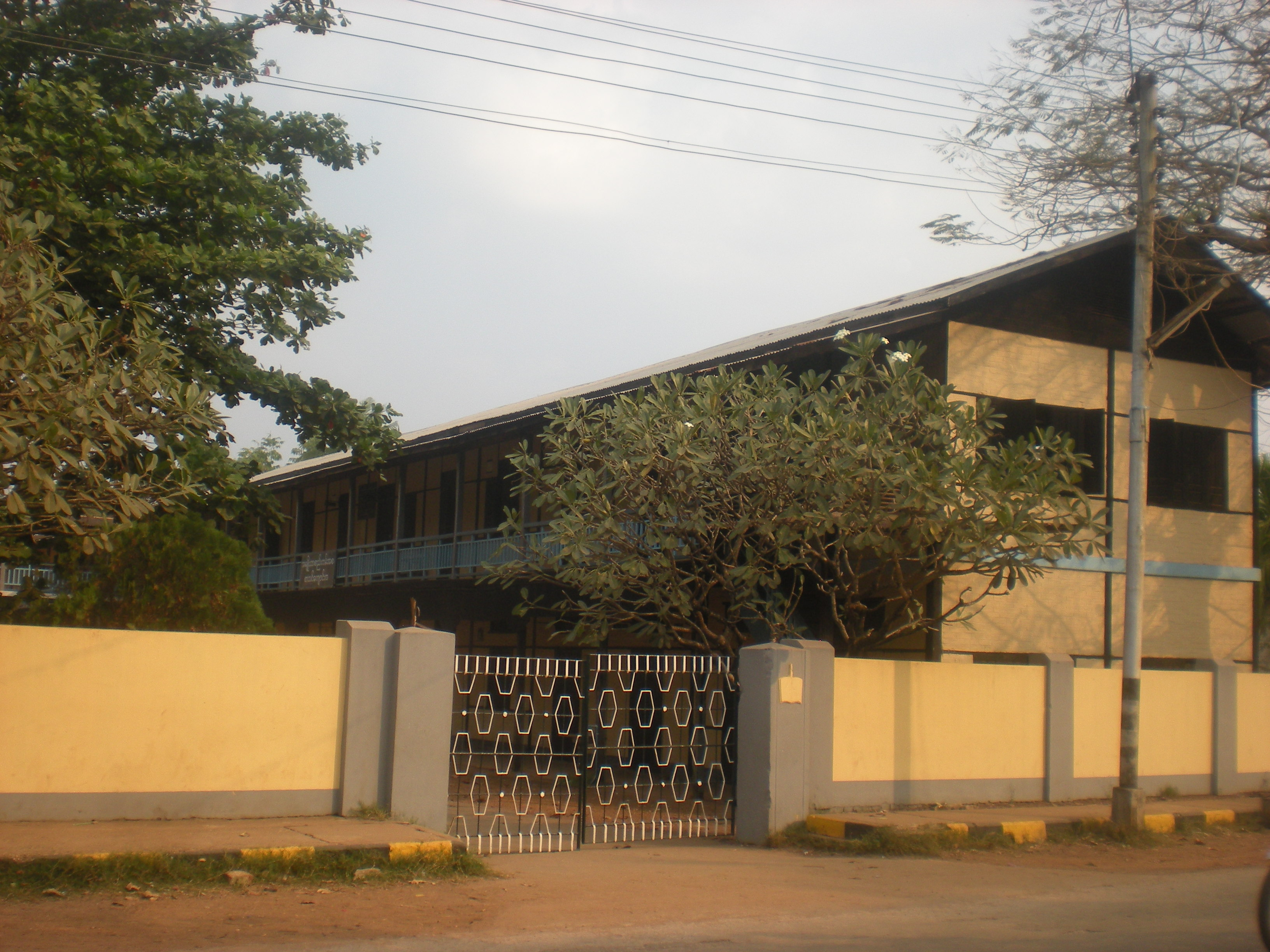
BEHS 1 Mudon

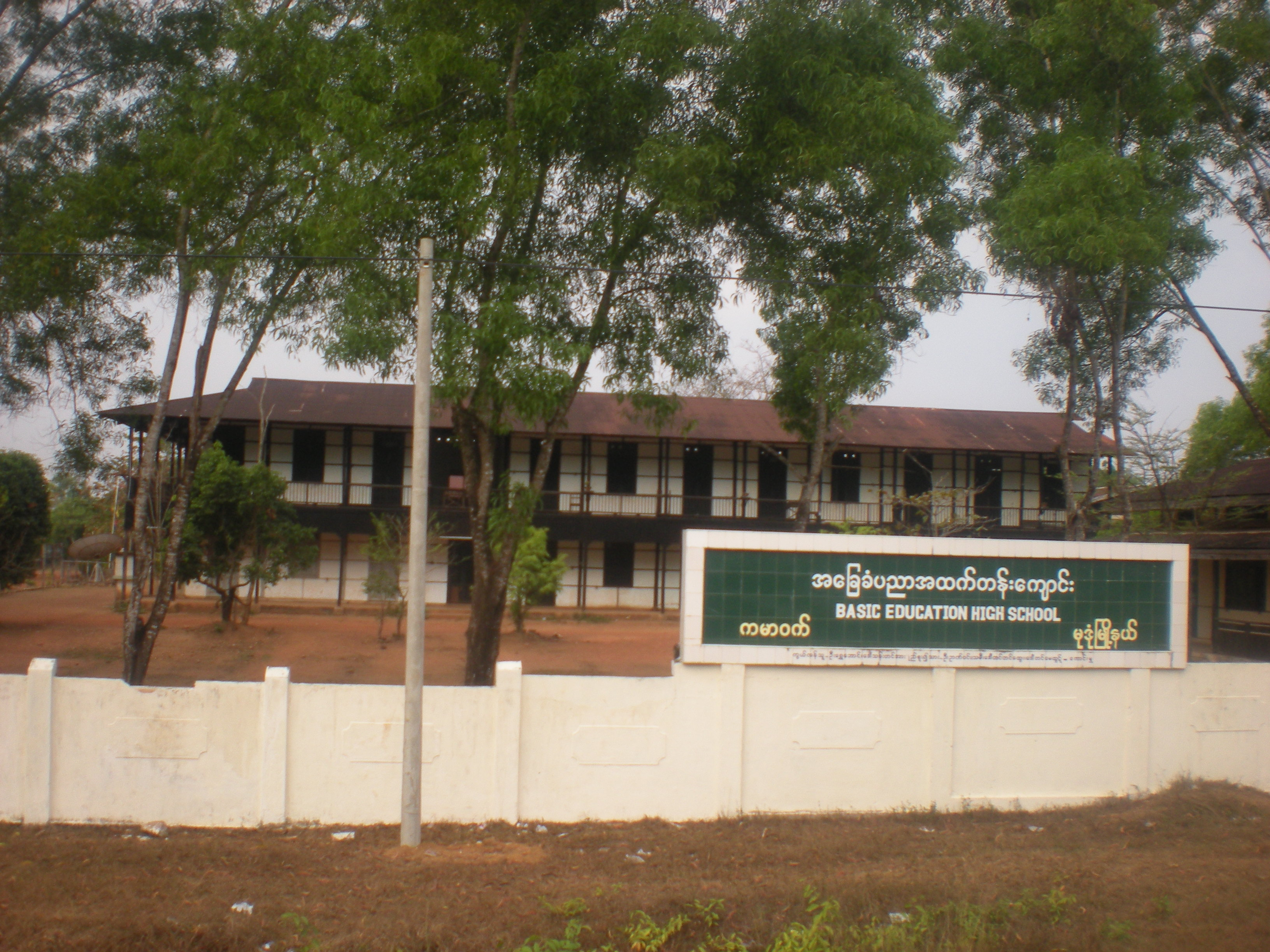
High School in Mudon Township

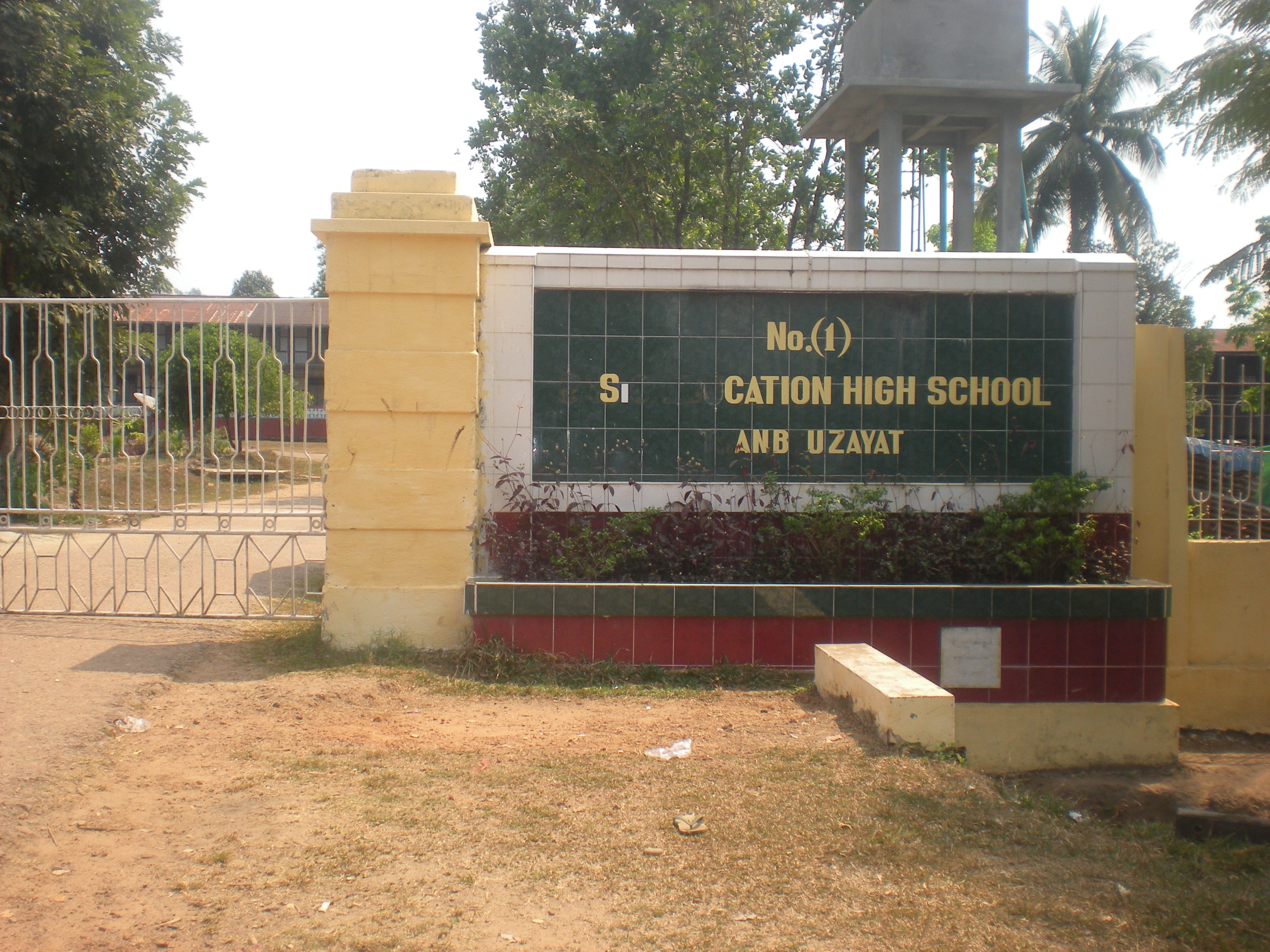
BEHS 1 Thanbyuzayat, Mon State

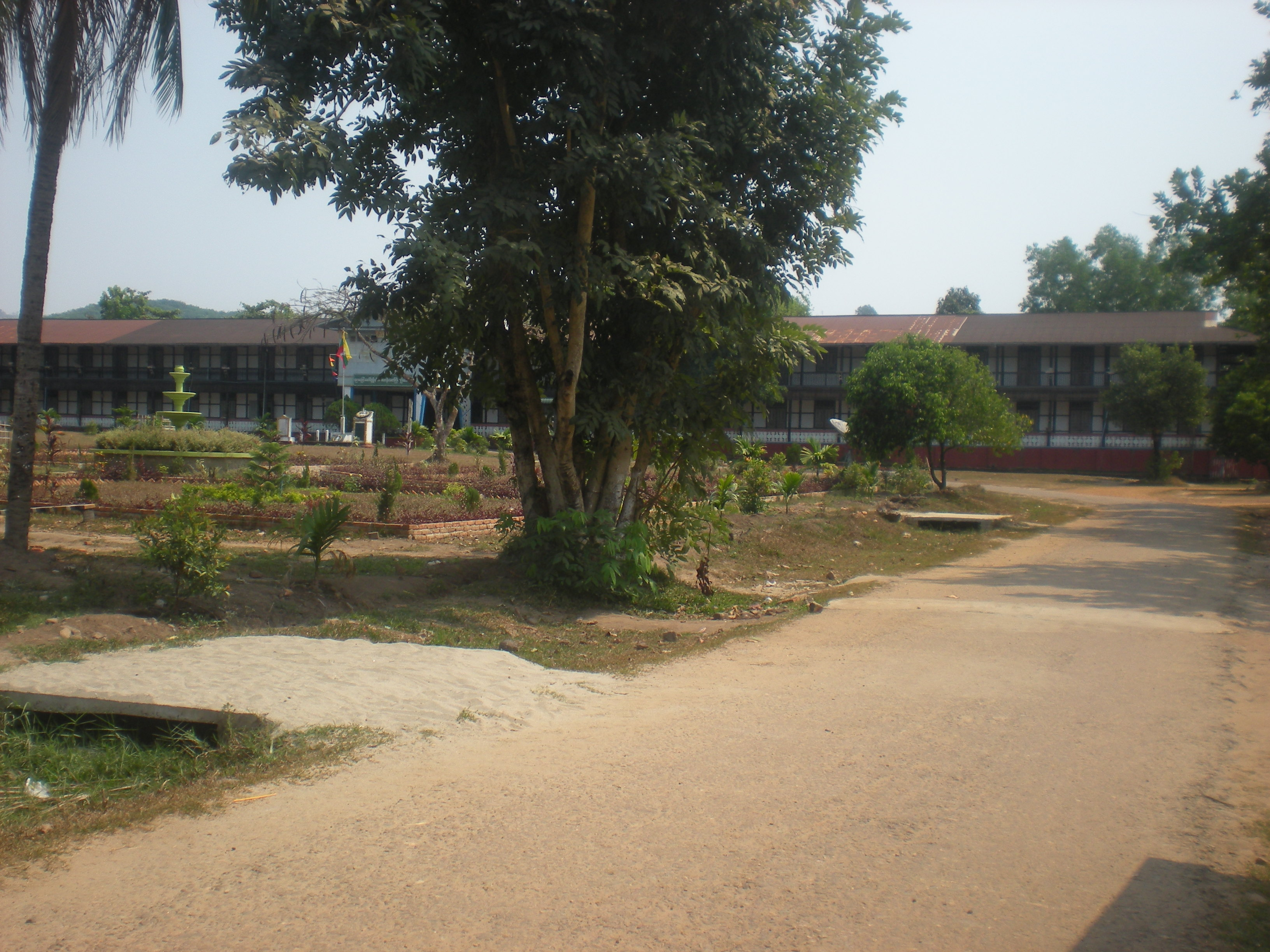
Thanphyuzayat campus

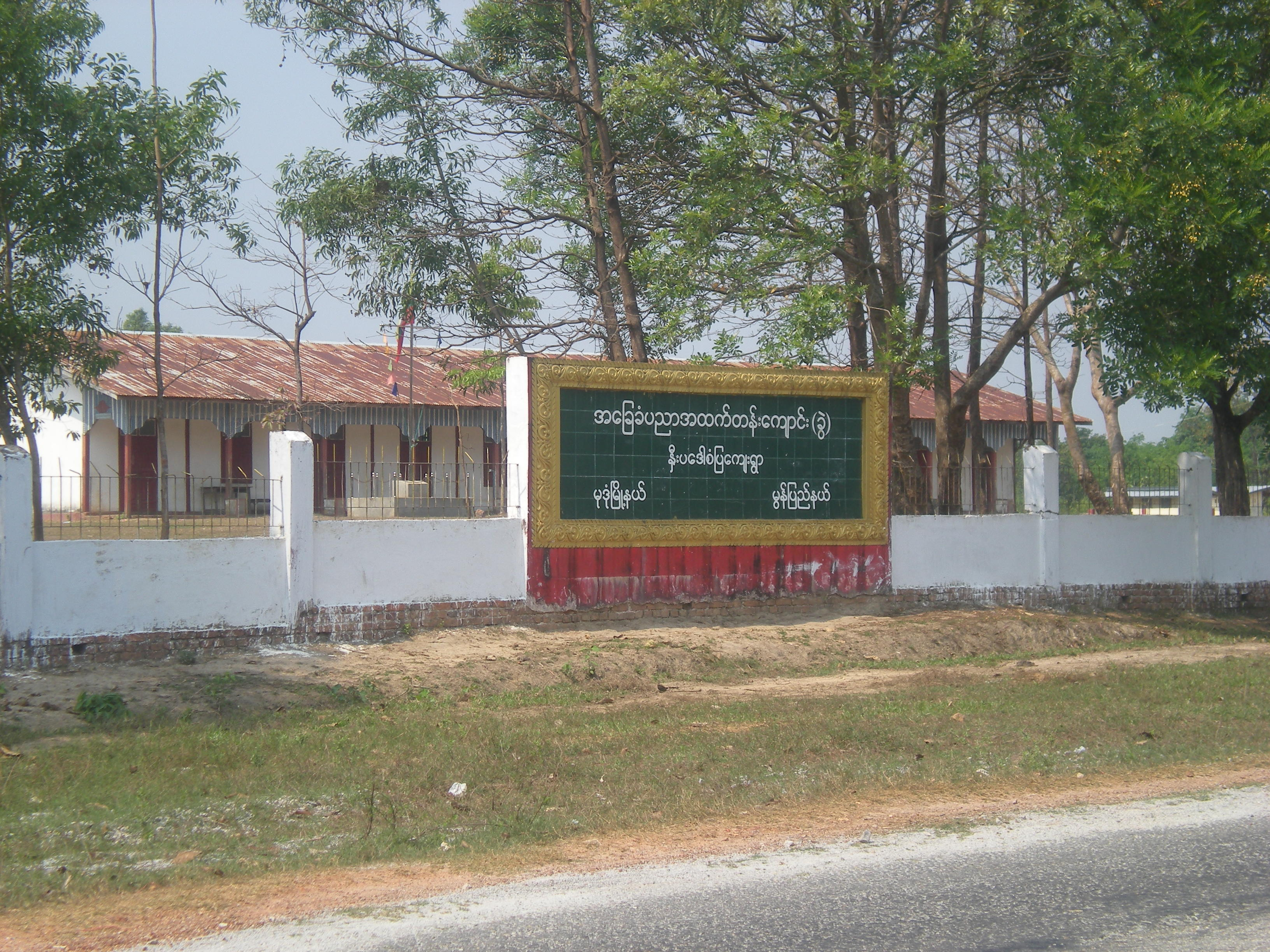
High School in Neebadaw, Thanphyuzayat

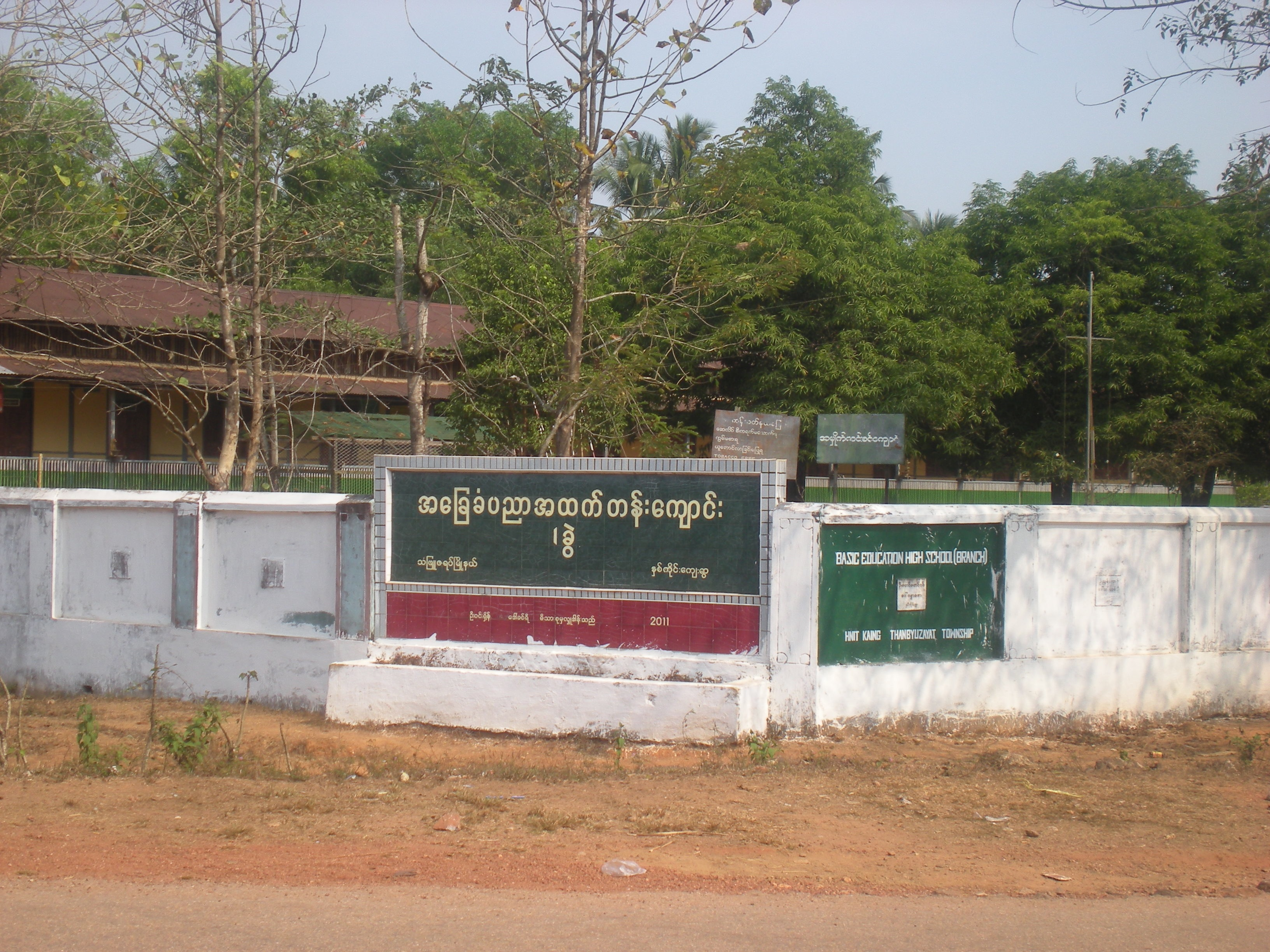
High School in Kyaikkhami Township

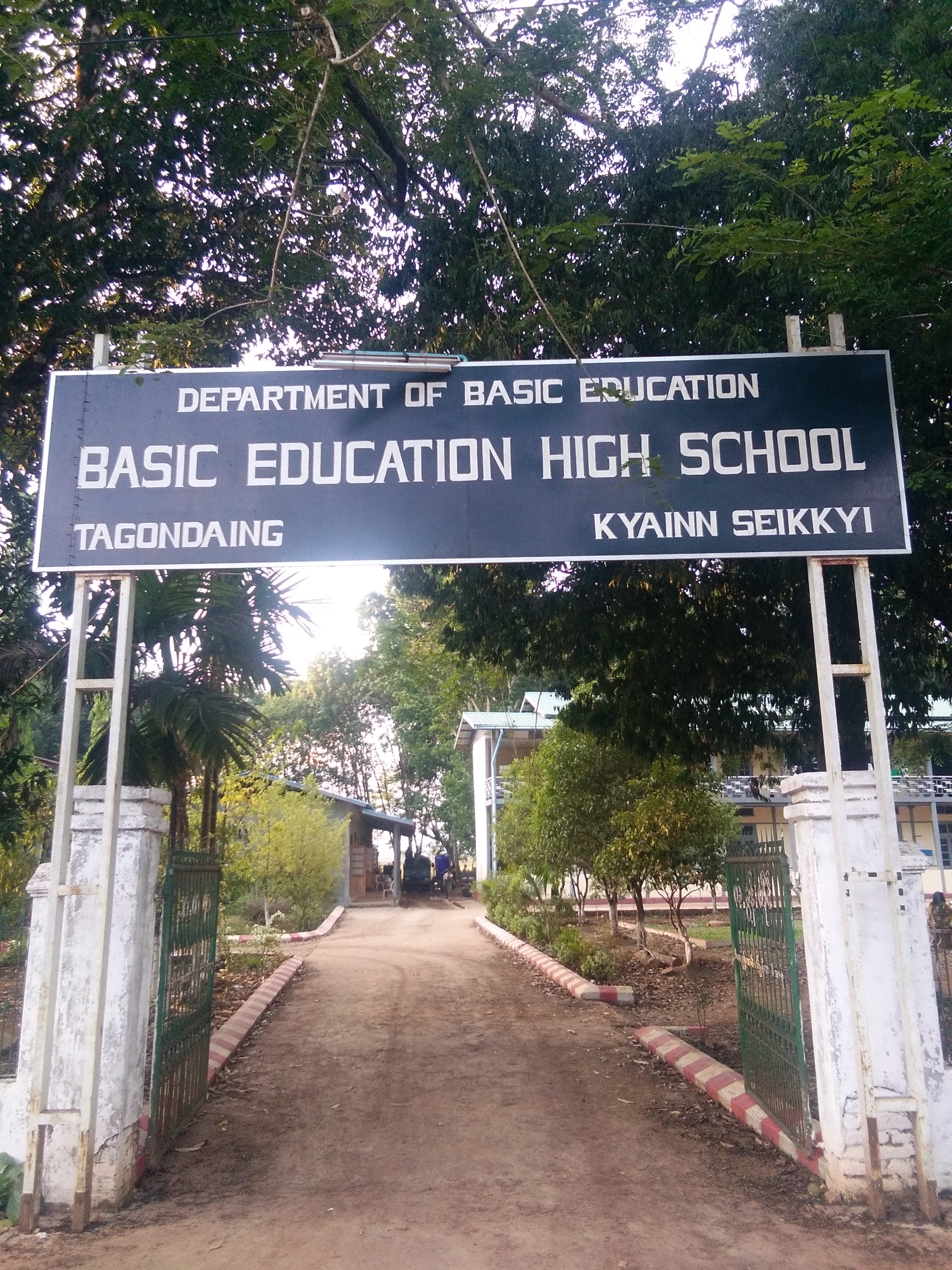
High School in Tagundaing, Kyain Seikgyi
