= Basic Education High School No. 5 Tamwe =

Public high school in Yangon, Myanmar

Coordinates: 16°48′01.9″N 96°10′22.5″E

- အ.ထ.က. (၅) တာမွေ

Location
- Kyaikkasan Road, Tamwe Township 11211; Yangon, Yangon Region; Myanmar

Information
- Former name: St. Francis Boys' School
- Type: Public
- School number: 5
- Principal: Myint Aung
- Grades: K-10

Basic Education High School No. 5 Tamwe (Burmese: အခြေခံ ပညာ အထက်တန်း ကျောင်း အမှတ် (၅) တာမွေ; commonly known as Tamwe 5 High School) is a public high school in Tamwe Township, Yangon, Myanmar. It used to be a Christian school when Burma was a British colony. Even before the school was nationalized, it has been a boys' school since establishment. The high school was formerly known as St. Francis Boys' School, and is still located immediately adjacent to St. Francis of Assisi Catholic Church, Yangon. Another immediate neighbor of the church is Basic Education High School No. 4 Tamwe, which was also once a Christian school.

== Notable alumni ==
- Nyunt Win
