= Basic Education High School No. 6 Mawlamyine =

Coordinates: 16°28′47″N 97°37′27″E

B.E.H.S No. 6 Mawlamyine အ.ထ.က (၆) မော်လမြိုင်

Location
- Upper Main Road, Mayangone Qtr; Mawlamyine, Mon State; Mon State

Information
- Former name: Morton Lane-Judson High School
- Type: Public
- Established: 1867; 159 years ago
- Founder: Susan Haswell
- School number: 6
- Principal: Daw Thi Thi Oo (current)
- Grades: KG-12
- Enrollment: ~3000

Basic Education High School (BEHS) No. 6 Mawlamyine (Burmese: အခြေခံပညာ အထက်တန်းကျောင်း အမှတ် (၆) မော်လမြိုင်; commonly known by its former name, Morton Lane - Judson School) is located at the corner of Upper Main Road and Dawei Tader Street (formerly Mission Street), Mawlamyine. It was originally renowned as American Baptist Mission (A.B.M) Girls' School.

== History ==
The founder of the school, Susan Haswell, was thought to be the last living link with Adoniram Judson. Her father, Rev. James M. Haswell was sent to Dr. Judson's assistance in 1835. Susan was born in the house of Adoniram Judson in Moulmein (now Mawlamyine), Burma (now known as Myanmar) in 1844. She took a postgraduate course at Houghton Seminary, in New York, then sailed back to Burma in 1864 and raised money to start girls' school in Moulmein, which later called as Morton Lane School.

=== Morton Lane Girls' High and Normal School (1867-1946) ===
Morton Lane School for Girls was the first institution of Susan Haswell's founding in Moulmein in 1867. It was one of the finest schools for girls in all the region, and it was a Baptist School.

=== Morton Lane-Judson High School (1946 May) ===
Later the girls' school was combined with Judson Boy's High School to become Morton Lane-Judson High School with 1476 students, of which U Aung Gywe was the principal at that time.

=== BEHS 6 Mawlamyine (since 1965) ===
After 1962 Burmese Coup d'état, General Ne Win's military government nationalized the schools all around Myanmar in April 1965, and the official name of the school had changed to BEHS 6 Mawlamyine.

== Campus ==
The campus of the school consists of:

- Nilar Building, two-storey building, for elementary school students.
- Theingi Building, two-storey building, for lower middle school students (Standard 5 and 6).
- Padamyar Building, two-storey building, for upper middle school students (Standard 7 and 8)
- Mya Sein Building, (Main building), three-storey building, for high school students.
- Tate Pan, one-storey laboratory.
- Regulation size football pitch and playground
- Muitimedia Rooms, one-storey building
- Cafetaria

Mawlamyine Township Education Office is located within its compound.
