= Practising School Yangon Institute of Education =

Coordinates: 16°49′4″N 96°8′4″E

Practising School, Institute of Education (?–2003) Practising High School, Yangon Institute of Education (2003–2014) Practising High School, Yangon University of Education (2014–2021)
- ပညာရေးတက္ကသိုလ် လေ့ကျင့်ရေးကျောင်း (?–2003) ရန်ကုန်ပညာရေးတက္ကသိုလ် လေ့ကျင့်ရေးအထက်တန်းကျောင်း (2003–2021)

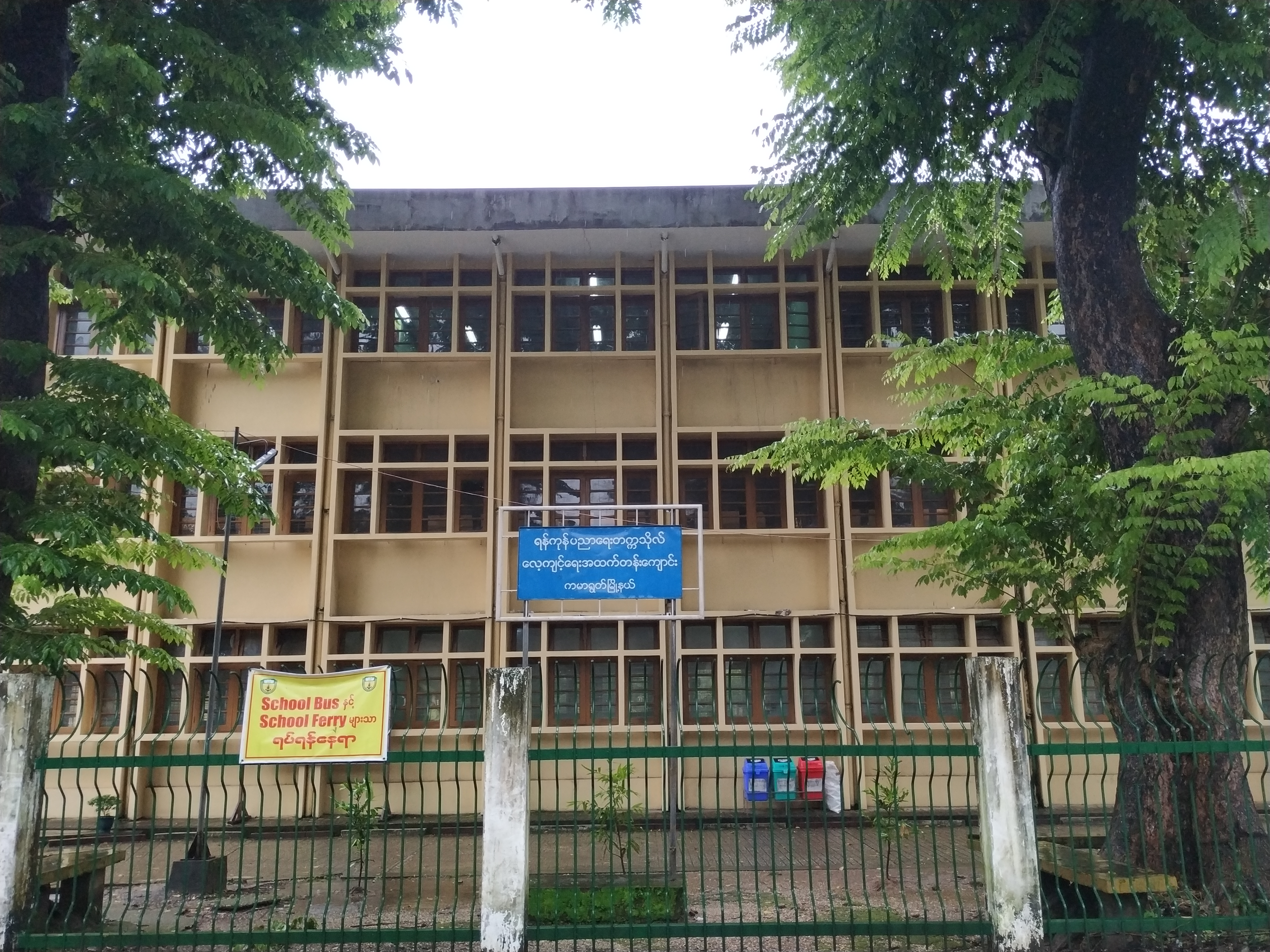
- School sign at Kamayut campus in 2020
- Pyay Road,Kamayut Township

Information
- Type: Comprehensive school
- Motto: ကျန်းမာရွှင်လန်းပါစေ
- Established: ~1930
- Rector: Kay Thwe Hlaing
- Principal: Moe Thu (2016-2018, last headmistress under Department of Higher Education); Win Win Nwe (2018-2021, last headmistress of PHSYUOE); Thwe Thwe Oo (incumbent headmistress of PHS Kamayut)
- Staff: 160
- Enrollment: 7420
- Campus: Kamayut campus; Hlaing campus (2000–2017)

Practising High School, Yangon University of Education
- Successor: Practising High School, Kamayut

The "Practising School, Yangon Institute of Education"(Burmese: ပညာရေးတက္ကသိုလ် လေ့ကျင့်ရေးကျောင်း), later, "Practising High School, Yangon University of Education"(Burmese: ရန်ကုန်ပညာရေးတက္ကသိုလ် လေ့ကျင့်ရေးအထက်တန်းကျောင်း) (abbreviated TTC Yangon) was the name of a high school in Yangon, Myanmar, which is currently called Basic Education Department, Practising High School, Kamayut Township (Burmese: အခြေခံပညာဦးစီးဌာန လေ့ကျင့်ရေးအထက်တန်းကျောင်း၊ ကမာရွတ်မြို့နယ်). Although it is a high school in the technical sense, TTC's student body comprises students from Grade Kg to Grade Twelve or Matriculation, the highest standard in the Myanmar's new education system. The origin of the name of the school comes from the fact that TTC is part of the Institute of Education (former Teachers' Training College), whose trainee teachers are attached to the school as part of their course.

== History ==
The school was established in 1931. Its main campus is situated on Pyay Road in Kamayut Township. It was established as an experimental school by the colonial education authority as a new means to deliver scientific education to the student body. Thus, the school did not fall under either the colonial government's school syllabus (consisting mostly of mission schools run by the religious order), nor the newly founded Nationalist Vernacular school network. Consequently, after Myanmar (Burma)'s independence, the school remained somewhat independent of the Basic Education High School network, although they shared the same government implemented syllabus.

Until the outbreak of the World War II, the school had boarding facilities, mainly for students from out of town. The school was served by the Rangoon Electric Tramway's University Line along Prome Road (now Pyay Road).

== Governance ==
Kamayut Campus

The Yangon University of Education (Lower Myanmar) independently ran the TTC High School with the joint administration of Higher Education Department, unlike the rest of the schools in the country which are administered by the Basic Education Department. TTC Yangon was therefore the only significant school of considerable size outside the Basic Education School network. But, since 2018, the Department of Higher Education started to transfer all the Practising Schools of Education Colleges and Universities of Education under it. TTC Yangon was completely transferred in 2021.

== School structure ==
TTC Yangon has a large student body in Yangon and in Myanmar, numbering nearly 9000. The students are spread across eleven standards or grades, from Grade-1 (formerly Kindergarten or KG) to Grade-11 (formerly Tenth Standard, colloquially sei-dan)

For many years, TTC students have a tradition of putting the right finger at the lip and say "Kyn mar shwin lan pr zay" means *_ကျန်းမာရွင်လန်းပါစေ ဆရာ/ဆရာမ_* – (good health to you) to the teachers. This is a tradition to show respect to the teachers.

== Admissions ==
School admission was particularly challenging, especially in the early 2000s, due to the presence of the grandsons of top Burmese generals at the school. Only the wealthy and children with families who had strong personal connections, as well as the children of university professors, could gain admission to the school. This selective student body makes the school’s admission process highly competitive, leading many parents to seek placement for their children in an environment surrounded by peers from similarly high-profile families.

== Campus ==
TTC has one campus: Pyay Road (in Kamayut Township) campus. Kamayut campus is 25.7 acres (104,000 m^{2}) wide, and is the main site of the school, housing much of the school's original pre-war buildings. TTC Kamayut Campus is different to other schools'campuses for their university-like locations.

Kamayut campus is bordered by three universities: the University of Medicine-1, Yangon, the University of Education, and the University of Distant Education, sharing the same main street, Thaton Street.

=== Renovations ===
TTC relied on already existing buildings for much of its existence. Much of these buildings were on loan from the Yangon University of Education. However, by 2000, the grants expired and were not renewed. In order to cope with the loss of nearly three-quarters of its classroom capacity, a building and renovation programme was implemented, resulting in the renting of the former University of Yangon (Hlaing Campus), which was also known as Regional College Number 2 (or RC-2), and the building of a new school wing. Five wings from RC-2 were rented from the Ministry of Education in 2000, and the completion of a three-storey wing.

With the rising use of the internet and government promotion of information technology, two IT labs have been added to the campus facilities, though they are not frequently used, due to the overwhelming student population. A new assembly hall, arts hall and a chemistry lab have also been added

=== Facilities ===
Pyay Campus

- The library building was built with funds donated by Daw Mya Nwe.
- Football field – the field was the site of a big nationalist vernacular school, which rented the field from 1932–1934. The field also housed refugee huts during the Second World War. The Student Volunteer Army of the Union of Burma, called Thanmani-tut in Burmese (lit. Steel Forces), were trained in the field. Most of the Thanmani-tut were used in the reconquest of the country from rebels and KMT forces.
- One canteen – It is opened in 2009. It's a large canteen. The food that the shopkeepers sell are also very healthy.
- Anu-pyin-nyar Hall – new assembly hall built in the new school wing, now used for school reunions and functions.
- Biology-Chemistry Lab – when the old lab was handed back to the Institute of Education, a new one was built to replace it, in the new school wing. However, equipment and chemicals are extremely hard to replace (high student population, funding issues, lack of teachers) and thus is seldom used.
- PT (Physical Training) Hall – an older occupant of the campus, it was renovated in 2004. It also serves as a back-up assembly hall and badminton court.
- IT Lab – built in the new school wing under the government's policy to embrace information technology, the IT lab shares the site with the Biology-Chemistry Lab, though it is more frequently used.

== Awards and recognition ==
It ranks the highest overall in Burmese High School in the Myanmar University Entrance exam, conducted by the Myanmar Examination Board. TTC's student body produces many high scoring students both in terms of collective subjects and individual subjects, making into the competitive "nationwide outstanding top-ten students' list", colloquially known as the whole-Burma or top ten list quite often.

TTC has won medals in national and international competitions, such as South East Asian Games.

Students have won medals in "Myanmar Traditional and Cultural Performing Arts Competition" (So-Ka-Yay-Tee) and won painting

competitions.

Typical football match

== Notable alumni ==
- Win Oo (Class of 1949) - two-time Myanmar Motion Picture Academy Awards winning Burmese actor, singer, director, writer and publisher
- Tay Za (Class of 1981) – owner of Air Bagan and Htoo Group of Companies
- Zaw Win Htut (Class of 1981)- singer
- Saung Oo Hlaing (1987) – singer
- Myo Kyawt Myaing (1987) – singer
- Yadana Khin (Class of 1997) – actress
- Kyaw Phyo Tun (Class of 2002) – rapper under the name "Ah Boy". Nephew of actor Lwin Moe.
- Moe Aung Yin (Class of 2003) – actor and son of singer Aung Yin
- Phyu Phyu Kyaw Thein (Class of 1998)
- Aung San (Independence Father of Myanmar)

== Former headteachers ==
- ??? (1931–1936)
- U Ba (1936–1952)
- U Kyaw Ngwe (1953–1956)
- Aye Tin (1956–1963)
- Thein Han (1963–1976)
- Tin Tin Aye (1976–1988)
- Khin May Yi (1989–1992)
- Khin Nwe Tint (1992–1997)
- Khin Win Aung (1997–2004)
- U Myo Win (2004–2007)
- Nandar Htun (2007–2010)
- Win Min Latt (2010–2011)
- Myint Myint San (2011–2016)
- Moe Thu (2016–2018)
- Win Win Nwe (2018–2021)
- Thwe Thwe Oo (2021–Present)
